= Huayi Publishing House =

National press in China, established in 1986

Huayi Publishing House (simplified Chinese: 华艺出版社; traditional Chinese: 華藝出版社), established in 1986, is a national press in China. Huayi Publishing House aims at propagating Chinese culture and promoting cultural exchange between countries. Located in the Haidian District in Beijing, it is a subsidiary under the China Association For Promotion of Culture (中華文化發展促進會). It publishes books under the categories of Social Science, Literature, Art and Popular Science and has won awards including “the Chinese Government Award for Publishing”, and “China Population Culture Award - Gold Medal”. Since 1986, the Huayi Publishing House has published more than 30 million books and picture albums.

== History ==
In 1991, Huayi Publishing House edited and published the Chinese Contemporary Writers Series (中国当代著名作家新作大系) featuring the works of renowned writers in China including Wang Meng, Liu Xinwu, Cong Weixi, Jiang Zilong, Zhang Kangkang, Feng Jicai, Shen Rong, Zhang Jie, Li Guowen, Liang Xiaosheng, Ye Nan, Mo Yan, Wang Shuo, Tie Ning, Chen Jiangong, Liu Zhenyun etc.

In 1992, Huayi Publishing House published a Young Writer Collection, Collected Works of Wang Shuo (王朔文集) for the first time. It also pioneered the royalty payment system in China. In the same year, Huayi Publishing House partnered with Kunming Hongda Group Company (昆明宏達集團) and published the Hongyi Collection (宏藝文庫). Later, the Collected Works of Wang Meng (王蒙文集), Collected Works of Liu Xinwu (劉心武文集), Collected Works of Cong Wenxi (從維熙文集), Collected Works of Jiangzilong (蔣子龍文集), and Collected Works of Zong Pu (宗璞文集) were published.

Operating under the Socialist Market Economy, Huayi Publishing House is proactive in expanding its market and has successfully secured its reputation in the publishing realm for its successful launching of books on renown figures. Popular titles include Painful and Happy (痛并快乐着) by Bai Yansong, It's Simply That (不過如此) by Cui Yongyuan, Sound of Footsteps (足音) by Sally Wu and Sound (聲音) by Jing Yidan. In addition, the series on renowned figures including Jiang Wen, Xu Jinglei and Gao Feng has helped the Huayi Publishing House obtain great market share.

== Past presidents ==
- Sun Bo
- Bao Lihan
- Shi Yongqi
