= Cui Daoyi =

Chinese writer (1934–2022)

Cui Daoyi (Chinese: 崔道怡, November 23, 1934–July 17, 2022) was a Chinese literary editor, writer and literary critic. He was the former executive deputy editor of People's Literature magazine, an editor, and an honorary member of the Chinese Writers Association. He was originally from Faku, Liaoning Province.

== Life and career ==
Born in Tieling City, Liaoning Province on November 23, 1934, he moved to Beiping with his family at the age of five. In 1953, his first children's novel The First Reader was published in Youth Literature and Art.

He graduated from the Chinese Department of Peking University in the summer of 1956. He joined People's Literature magazine, and over the course of his time there, worked as an editor, head of novel group, deputy director, deputy editor-in-chief and executive deputy editor-in-chief.

He joined the Chinese Communist Party in 1984.

In October 1987, he was promoted to editor. As an editor, Cui found and recommended many new literary talents and edited a large number of excellent masterpieces. He was known as "the literary ferryman", "the national editor", "the first editor in the world" and "the chief novel editor". Cui ensured the pure character and high-quality operation of his publication with his broad literary vision, keen artistic judgment, passion for his work, and strict political control. He also served as the director of the editorial board of the "Star of Literature Series in the 21st Century", and made significant contributions to the growth of new literary people from generation to generation.

He retired in the winter of 1998. In 1992, he received a special government allowance, and he continued to win awards for his work in writing and editing. He died in Beijing at 14:10 on July 17th, 2022.

== Major achievements ==
During his nearly forty-year editing career, Cui discovered and trained a large number of writers, including Wang Zengqi, Li Guowen, Jiang Zilong and Liu Xinwu, and edited a large number of high-quality works, such as The Other Side of the Mountain, The Head Teacher, and Anecdotes on the Western Front. In 1979, he began editing The China New Literature Series, selected short stories from the 30th and 50th anniversaries of the founding of the People's Republic of China. In 1985, at the invitation of Baihua Publishing House, he edited The Novel Picking the Pearl, a collection of short stories which won awards from 1979 to 1983. In 1983, he began serving as the judge of the National Excellent Novel Award, the National Excellent Children's Literature Award, and the Lu Xun Literary Prize, sponsored by the Chinese Writers Association, the "Five One Project" Award sponsored by the Central Propaganda Department, the judge of the government periodical award sponsored by the State Publishing Administration, and the honorary member of the National Committee of the Chinese Writers Association.

In 1988, Cui won the Excellent Editor Award of National Literary Periodicals. In 1996, he was awarded the title of National Top 100 Publishers by the General Administration of Publishing. In 2006, he won the third Lao She Prose Award. In 2020, he was awarded the Tribute to a Senior Literary Editor Award by China Writers Publishing Group and the National Federation of Literary Newspapers.

== Publications ==
He is the author of thechildren's book The Road of Players, the short story "About the Use of an Egg", the novella Unnamed Autumn Rain, and the monographs Talk about Creative Skills, Introduction to Novel Creation, Twelve Lectures on Novel Creation, Water is Clouding, and Square Apple.
