= Mao Dun Literature Prize =

Chinese literary award

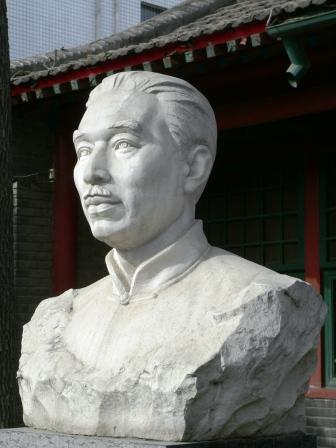
A statue of Mao Dun at his former residence in Beijing

The Mao Dun Literature Prize (Chinese: 茅盾文学奖; pinyin: Máo Dùn Wénxué Jiǎng) is an award for novels, established in the will of prominent Chinese writer Mao Dun (for which he personally donated 250,000 RMB) and sponsored by the China Writers Association. Awarded every four years, it is one of the most prestigious literature prizes in China. It was first awarded in 1982.

== Selection rules ==
According to selection rule, any work, authored by Chinese nationals, published in mainland China, and with over 130,000 characters, is eligible.

The selection committee in the Chinese Writers Association holds the voting poll twice, and the winner must receive over 2/3 of the votes cast. The process is highly selective and each time, the number of winners is between three and five. The prize is awarded every four years, though it was originally awarded every three years.

== Criticism ==
The award was recently criticized for the 2011 awards, when it was revealed that eight of the top ten on the list were either the chair or vice-chairpersons of prominent provincial writers' associations. An editorial in the China Daily stated "official status cannot and should not be a criterion for literary excellence. That's why people doubt the authenticity of prizes that are awarded to officials for their literary achievements."

To avoid such controversy, novelist Tie Ning decided her works will not enter the awards as long as she is chairwoman of China Writers Association, a position she held from 2006 to 2025.

== Winners and nominees ==
1982 (1st)

- Xu Mao and His Daughters (许茂和他的女儿们) by Zhou Keqin
- Orient (东方) by Wei Wei
- General's Chant (将军吟) by Mo Yingfeng
- Li Zicheng (李自成) by Yao Xueyin
- A Small Town Called Hibiscus (芙蓉镇) by Gu Hua
- Spring in Winter (冬天里的春天) by Li Guowen

1985 (2nd)

- The Yellow River Flows to the East (黄河东流去) by Li Zhun
- Leaden Wings (沉重的翅膀) by Zhang Jie
- The Wedding Party (钟鼓楼) by Liu Xinwu

1991 (3rd)

- Ordinary World (平凡的世界) by Lu Yao
- Young Emperor (少年天子) by Ling Li
- Metropolis (都市风流) by Sun Li and Yu Xiaohui
- The Second Sun (第二个太阳) by Liu Baiyu
- The Jade King (穆斯林的葬禮) by Huo Da

Honorary awards:

- Bloody Heaven (浴血罗霄) by Xiao Ke
- Broken Golden Bowl (金瓯缺) by Xu Xingye

1997 (4th)

- War and People (战争和人) by Wang Huo
- White Deer Field (白鹿原) by Chen Zhongshi
- White Gate Willow (白门柳) by Liu Sifen
- Unsettled Autumn (骚动之秋) by Liu Yumin

2000 (5th)

- The Choice (抉择) by Zhang Ping
- Red Poppies (尘埃落定) by Alai
- The Song of Everlasting Sorrow (长恨歌) by Wang Anyi
- Trilogy of the Tea Masters (茶人三部曲) by Wang Xufeng

2005 (6th)

- Zhang Juzheng (張居正) by Xiong Zhaozheng
- Wordless (无字) by Zhang Jie
- Sky of History (历史的天空) by Chu Chunqiu
- Heroic Time (英雄时代) by Liu Jianwei
- Eastern Concealment (东藏记) by Zong Pu

2008 (7th)

- The Shaanxi Opera (秦腔) by Jia Pingwa
- The Last Quarter of the Moon (额尔古纳河右岸) by Chi Zijian
- The Sons of Red Lake (湖光山色) by Zhou Daxin
- In the Dark (暗算) by Mai Jia

2011 (8th)

- On the Plateau (你在高原) by Zhang Wei
- The Sky Dwellers (天行者) by Liu Xinglong
- Frog (蛙) by Mo Yan
- Massage (推拿) by Bi Feiyu
- Someone to Talk To (一句顶一万句) by Liu Zhenyun

Nominated works:

- I'm My God (我是我的神) by Deng Yiguang
- Mai River (麦河) by Guan Renshan
- Lunar Calendar (农历) by Guo Wenbin
- Empires of Dust (农民帝国) by Jiang Zilong
- A Land Cast in Moonlight (遍地月光) by Liu Qingbang

2015 (9th)

- Jiangnan Trilogy (江南三部曲) by Ge Fei
- The Scenery Around Here (这边风景) by Wang Meng
- Book of Life (生命册) by Li Peifu
- Blossoms (繁华) by Jin Yucheng
- Shadow of the Hunter (黄雀记) by Su Tong

Nominated works:

- My Country, My Blood (吾血吾土) by Fan Wen
- Kalabu Storm (喀拉布风暴) by Hong Ke
- Going North (北去来辞) by Lin Bai
- Jerusalem (耶路撒冷) by Xu Zechen
- Above Living (活着之上) by Yan Zhen

2019 (10th)

- The Human World (人世间) by Liang Xiaosheng
- That Which Can't Be Washed Away (牵风记) by Xu Huaizhong
- Northward (北上) by Xu Zechen
- The Protagonist (主角) by Chen Yan
- Brother Ying Wu (应物兄) by Li Er

Nominated works:

- Northern Kite (北鸢) by Ge Liang
- Bearing Word (捎话) by Liu Liangcheng
- Looking for Zhang Zhan (寻找张展) by Sun Huifen
- Unforgettable (刻骨铭心) by Ye Zhaoyan
- Dunhuang Records (敦煌本纪) by Ye Zhou

2023 (11th)

- The Snow Mountain and the Homeland (雪山大地) by Yang Zhijun
- Baoshui Village (宝水) by Qiao Ye
- Bomba (本巴) by Liu Liangcheng
- A Panorama of Rivers and Mountains (千里江山图) by Sun Ganlu
- Ripples in the Lake (回响) by Dong Xi

Nominated works:

- Food is Heaven (燕食记) by Ge Liang
- Alive (有生) by Hu Xuewen
- Golden River (金色河流) by Lu Min
- In the Haze (烟霞里) by Wei Wei
- Distant White Horse (远去的白马) by Zhu Xiuhai

== Works available in English ==
Winners

- 1982 (1st) – Gu Hua, A Small Town Called Hibiscus (trans. Gladys Yang, Panda Books, 1983) / Li Guowen, Spring in Winter (trans. Liu Quanfu, Sinoist Books, 2 vols., 2018–2019)
- 1985 (2nd) – Zhang Jie, Leaden Wings (trans. Gladys Yang, Virago Press, 1987) / Liu Xinwu, The Wedding Party (trans. Jeremy Tiang, AmazonCrossing, 2022)
- 1991 (3rd) – Huo Da, The Jade King (trans. Guan Yuehua, Panda Books, 1992) / Sun Li and Yu Xiaohui, Metropolis (trans. David Kwan, Panda Books, 1992)
- 2000 (5th) – Alai, Red Poppies (trans. Howard Goldblatt and Sylvia Li-chun Lin, Houghton Mifflin Harcourt, 2003) / Wang Anyi, The Song of Everlasting Sorrow (trans. Michael Berry and Susan Chan Egan, Columbia University Press, 2008) / Wang Xufeng, The Story of the Carefree Tea Mansion (trans. Weihua Yu, Zhifu Qian, and Jim Weldon, Homa & Sekey Books, 2022) / Zhang Ping, The Choice (trans. James Trapp, Sinoist Books, 2024)
- 2005 (6th) – Zong Pu, Eastern Concealment (trans. Wen Lingxia, Sinoist Books, 2019)
- 2008 (7th) – Chi Zijian, The Last Quarter of the Moon (trans. Bruce Humes, Vintage Books, 2013) / Mai Jia, In the Dark (trans. Olivia Milburn and Christopher Payne, Penguin Books, 2015) / Zhou Daxin, The Sons of Red Lake (trans. Haiwang Yuan and Thomas Bray, Sinoist Books, 2022) / Jia Pingwa, The Shaanxi Opera (trans. Nicky Harman and Dylan Levi King, AmazonCrossing, 2023)
- 2011 (8th) – Bi Feiyu, Massage (trans. Howard Goldblatt and Sylvia Li-chun Lin, Penguin Books, 2015) / Mo Yan, Frog (trans. Howard Goldblatt, Viking Press, 2015) / Liu Xinglong, The Sky Dwellers (trans. Emily Jones, Aurora Publishing, 2016) / Liu Zhenyun, Someone to Talk To (trans. Howard Goldblatt and Sylvia Li-chun Lin, Duke University Press, 2018)
- 2015 (9th) – Ge Fei, Peach Blossom Paradise (trans. Canaan Morse, New York Review Books, 2022) / Su Tong, Shadow of the Hunter (trans. James Trapp, Sinoist Books, 2022)
- 2019 (10th) – Xu Huaizhong, That Which Can't Be Washed Away (trans. Haiwang Yuan and Will Spence, Sinoist Books, 2023)
- 2023 (11th) – Dong Xi, Ripples in the Lake (trans. James Trapp, Sinoist Books, 2026)

Nominees

- 2011 (8th) – Jiang Zilong, Empires of Dust (trans. Christopher Payne and Olivia Milburn, Sinoist Books, 2019)
- 2015 (9th) – Fan Wen, My Country, My Blood (trans. Scott Rainen, Big Sky Publishing, 2019)
- 2019 (10th) – Liu Liangcheng, Bearing Word (trans. Jeremy Tiang, Balestier Press, 2023)
