= Shi Nai'an Literary Prize =

The Shi Nai'an Literary Prize (施耐庵长篇叙事文学奖, abbreviated to 施耐庵文学奖) is awarded to a Chinese novel exhibiting an innovative style of narration. It is named after the Chinese author Shi Nai'an.

== About the prize ==
This prize is awarded by the People's Government of Xinghua city, in Jiangsu province. It is named after Shi Nai'an, who was said to be from Xinghua. The prize aims to encourage depth and development in novels written in Chinese, and to promote the status of Chinese novels in the world. The prize was first awarded in 2011. After a hiatus, the award resumed in 2018.

== Winners ==
Year	Award	Writer	Title	Notes
2011	1st year	Jia Pingwa 贾平凹	《古炉》	
2011	1st year	Yan Lianke 阎连科	《我与父辈》	
2011	1st year	Dong Qizhang 董启章	《天工开物·栩栩如真》	overseas
2011	1st year	Ning Ken 宁肯	《天·藏》	
2013	2nd year	Jin Yucheng 金宇澄	《繁花》	
2013	2nd year	Li Peifu 李佩甫	《生命册》	
2013	2nd year	Wang Anyi 王安忆	《天香》	
2013	2nd year	Yan Geling 严歌苓	《陆犯焉识》	overseas

== Honour Titles ==
To encourage writers in Xinghua.

Year	Award	Winning Author	Work
2011	1st Year	Gu Huai 谷怀	《南瓜花》
2011	1st Year	Gu Jian 顾坚	《青果》
2013	2nd Year	Wang Rui (author) 王锐	《谁说那些年的青涩不是爱》
2013	2nd Year	Liu Renqian 刘仁前	《浮城》
