= Gladys Yang =

British translator of Chinese literature (1919–1999)

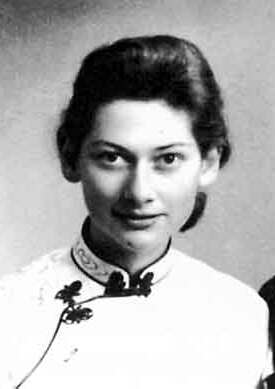
- Yang in 1941
- Born: Gladys Margaret Tayler; 19 January 1919; Beijing, China
- Died: 18 November 1999 (aged 80); Beijing, China
- Other names: Chinese: 戴乃迭; pinyin: Dài Nǎidié
- Education: St Anne's College, Oxford (MA)
- Occupation: Translator
- Spouse: Yang Xianyi
- Children: 3

Gladys Yang (Chinese: 戴乃迭; pinyin: Dài Nǎidié; 19 January 1919 – 18 November 1999) was a British translator of Chinese literature and the wife of another noted literary translator, Yang Xianyi.

== Biography ==
She was born Gladys Margaret Tayler at the Peking Union Medical College Hospital, Beijing, China, where her father, John Bernard Tayler, was a Congregationalist missionary and a member of the London Missionary Society and where from childhood she became intrigued by Chinese culture.

She returned to England as a child and from 1927 to 1937 boarded at Walthamstow Hall in Sevenoaks, Kent. She then became Oxford University's first graduate in Chinese language in 1940, following studies there under Ernest Richard Hughes. It was at Oxford that she met Yang.

After their marriage, the couple were based in Beijing as prominent translators of Chinese literature into English in the latter half of the 20th century, working for the Foreign Languages Press. Their four-volume Selected Works of Lu Xun (1956–1957) made the major work of China's greatest 20th-century writer available in English for the first time. In 1957 their translation of the Qing dynasty novel The Scholars appeared.

The couple were imprisoned as "class enemies" from 1968 to 1972 during the Cultural Revolution. Their work on The Dream of Red Mansions, an 18th-century novel still read by almost all educated Chinese, was interrupted by their imprisonment, but their faithful, readable three-volume translation appeared in 1978.

During the 1980s, Gladys Yang translated the works of other Chinese authors for the British publishing house, Virago Press, which specialized in women's writing and books on feminist topics.

Later in life, the couple spoke out against the 1989 Tiananmen Square massacre, and their unpublished memoirs were officially banned in China as a result.

== Personal life ==
Gladys Yang died in Beijing on November 18, 1999, aged 80, after a decade of declining health. She was survived by her husband, two daughters and four grandchildren.

Their only son had committed suicide in London in 1979. When the couple were identified as class enemies and kept in separate prisons from 1968 for four years, their children were sent to remote factory farms to work. Their son became mentally ill there and never recovered.

== Translations ==
- Guo Moruo, Chu Yuan: A Play in Five Acts, trans. Yang Hsien-yi and Gladys Yang, Beijing, Foreign Languages Press, 1953
- Qu Yuan, Li Sao and Other Poems of Chu Yuan, trans. Yang Xianyi & Gladys Yang, Beijing, Foreign Language Press, 1953; republished as Selected Elegies of the State of Chu, 2001
- Zhao Shu-li, Changes in Li Village, trans. Gladys Yang, Beijing, Foreign Languages Press, 1953
- Hong Sheng, The Palace of Eternal Youth, trans. Yang Hsien-yi and Gladys Yang, Beijing, Foreign Languages Press, 1955
- Lu Xun, Selected Works of Lu Hsun, 4 vols., Beijing, Foreign Languages Press, 1956-1961
- Wu Jingzi, The Scholars, trans. Yang Hsien-yi and Gladys Yang; ill. by Cheng Shifa, Beijing, Foreign Languages Press, 1957
- Ancient Chinese Fables, trans. Yang Xianyi and Gladys Yang, Beijing, Foreign Languages Press, 1957
- Liang Bin, Keep the Red Flag Flying, China Youth Publishing House, 1957
- Zhao Shu-li, Sanliwan Village, trans. Gladys Yang, Beijing, Foreign Languages Press, 1957
- The Man Who Sold a Ghost : Chinese Tales of the 3rd-6th Centuries, trans. Yang Hsien-Yi and Gladys Yang, Beijing, Foreign Languages Press, 1958
- Selected Plays of Guan Hanqing, trans. Yang Hsien-yi end Gladys Yang, Shanghai, New Art and Literature Publishing House, 1958, republished: Beijing, Foreign Languages Press, 1958, 1979
- Feng Yuan-chun, A Short History of Classical Chinese Literature, trans. Yang Hsien-yi and Gladys Yang, Beijing, Foreign Languages Press, 1958
- Lu Xun, Old Tales Retold, trans. Yang Xianyi & Gladys Yang, Beijing, Foreign Language Press, 1961
- The Dragon King's Daughter: Ten Tang Dynasty Stories, trans. Yang Xianyi and Gladys Yang, Beijing, Foreign Languages Press, 1962; reprinted with three additional stories as Tang Dynasty Stories, Beijing, Chinese Literature, 1986
- Sima Qian, Records of the Historian, trans. Yang Hsien-yi and Gladys Yang, Hong Kong, The Commercial Press, 1974; republished: Selections from Records of the Historian Written by Szuma Chien, Beijing, Foreign Languages Press, 1979
- Lu Xun, Dawn Blossoms Plucked at Dusk, trans. Yang Xianyi & Gladys Yang, Beijing, Foreign Language Press, 1976
- Cao Xueqin, A Dream of Red Mansions, trans. Yang Hsien-yi and Gladys Yang], Beijing, Foreign Languages Press, 1978
- The Courtesan's Jewel Box: Chinese Stories of the Xth-XVIIth Centuries, trans. Yang Xianyi and Gladys Yang, Beijing, Foreign Languages Press, 1980
- Lazy Dragon: Chinese Stories from the Ming Dynasty, ed. Geremie Barme, trans. Yang Xianyi & Gladys Yang, Hong Kong, Joint Publ. Co., 1981
- Excerpts from Three Classical Chinese Novels [The Three Kingdoms, Pilgrimage to the West, Flowers in the Mirror], trans. Yang Xianyi & Gladys Yang, Beijing, Chinese Literature, 1981
- Lu Xun, Call to Arms, trans. Yang Xianyi & Gladys Yang, Beijing, Foreign Languages Press, 1981
- Lu Xun, Wandering, trans. Yang Xianyi & Gladys Yang, Beijing, Foreign Languages Press, 1981
- Shen Congwen, The Border Town and Other Stories, trans. Gladys Yang, Chinese Literature Press, 1981
- Shen Congwen, Recollections of West Hunan, trans. Gladys Yang, Panda Books, 1982
- George Bernard Shaw, Pygmalion, trans. Yang Xianyi and Gladys Yang, Beijing, Chinese Literature, distributed by China Publications Centre, 1982
- Li Guangtian, A Pitiful Plaything and Other Essays, trans. Gladys Yang, Beijing, Chinese Literature, 1982
- Liu E, The Travels of Lao Can, trans. Yang Xianyi and Gladys Yang, Beijing, Chinese Literature, distributed by China Publications Centre, 1983
- Selections from the Book of Songs, trans. Yang Xianyi, Gladys Yang and Hu Shiguang, Beijing, Chinese Literature, 1983
- Zhang Shouchen and Others, Traditional Comic Tales, trans. Gladys Yang, Beijing, Chinese Literature, 1983
- Wang Meng, The Butterfly and Other Stories, trans. Gladys Yang [title novella], Beijing, Chinese Literature, 1983
- Gu Hua, A Small Town Called Hibiscus, trans. Gladys Yang, Beijing, Chinese Literature Press, 1983
- Ding Ling, The Sun Shines Over the Sanggan River, trans. Yang Xianyi and Gladys Yang, Beijing, Chinese Literature, distributed by China Publications Centre, 1984
- Poetry and Prose of the Tang and Song, trans. Yang Xianyi and Gladys Yang, Beijing, Chinese Literature, distributed by China Publications Centre, 1984
- Zhang Xianliang, Mimosa and Other Stories, trans. Gladys Yang [title novel], Beijing, Chinese Literature Press, 1985
- Ru Zhijuan, Lilies and Other Stories, trans. Gladys Yang, et al., Beijing, Chinese Literature, 1985
- Gu Hua, Pagoda Ridge and Other Stories, trans. Gladys Yang, Beijing, Chinese Literature, 1985
- Poetry and Prose of the Han, Wei and Six Dynasties, trans. Yang Xianyi and Gladys Yang, Beijing, Chinese Literature, 1986
- Deng Youmei, Snuff-Bottles and Other Stories, trans. Gladys Yang, Beijing, Chinese Literature, 1986
- Zhang Xinxin & Sang Ye, Chinese Profiles, trans. Gladys Yang, et al., Beijing, Chinese Literature Press, 1986
- Zhang Jie, Love Must Not Be Forgotten, trans. Gladys Yang, et al., Beijing, Chinese Literature Press, 1987
- Zhang Jie, Leaden Wings, trans. Gladys Yang, London, Virago Press, 1987.
- Zhang Jie, As Long As Nothing Happens, Nothing Will, trans. Gladys Yang, Deborah J. Leonard and Zhang Andong, London, Virago Press, 1988.
- Tao Yuanming, Selected Poems, trans. Gladys Yang & Yang Xianyi, Beijing, Chinese Literature Press, 1993
- Shen Congwen, Selected Stories by Shen Congwen, edited by Yang Xianyi and Gladys Yang, Chinese Literature Press, 1999
- Feng Menglong, Selected Chinese Stories of the Song and Ming Dynasties, trans. Yang Xianyi and Gladys Yang, Beijing, 2000
