= Liu Xinglong =

Chinese novelist

- 刘醒龙
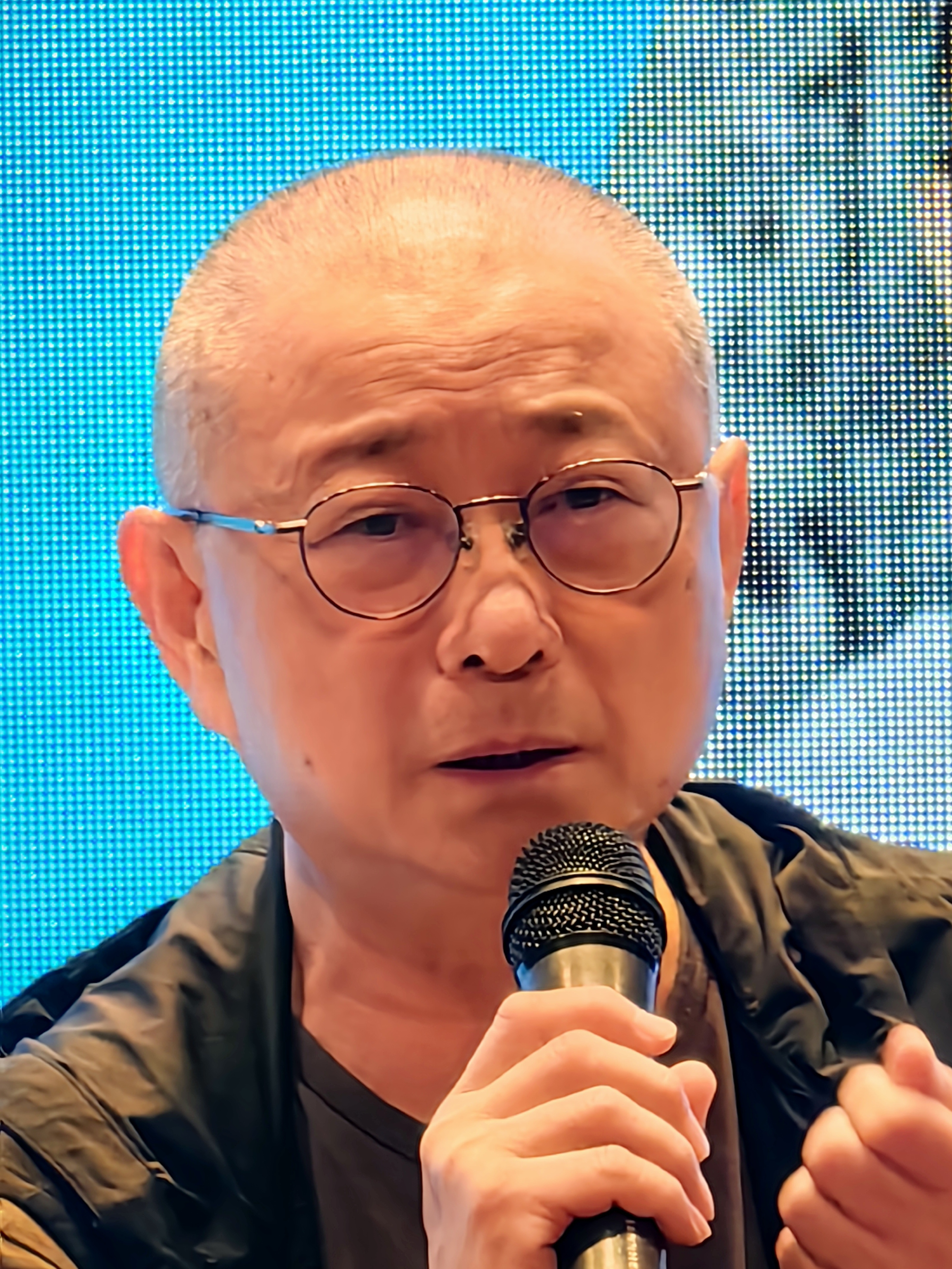
- Liu Xinglong in 2024
- Born: January 10, 1956 (age 70); Huanggang, Hubei, China
- Education: Hongshan High School
- Occupation: Novelist
- Writing career
- Language: Chinese
- Period: 1984–present
- Genre: Novel
- Notable work: The Sky Dwellers
- Notable awards: 8th Mao Dun Literature Prize; 2011 The Sky Dwellers

Liu Xinglong (simplified Chinese: 刘醒龙; traditional Chinese: 劉醒龍; pinyin: Liú Xǐnglóng; born 10 January 1956) is a Chinese novelist who is the vice president of Hubei Writers Association and vice president of the Wuhan Literature and Art Association.

== Biography ==
Liu was born in Huanggang, Hubei in January 1956. Liu graduated from Hongshan High School (红山高中) in 1973. After graduation, Liu worked as a worker in factory between 1974 and 1985.

Liu started to publish works in 1984 and he joined the China Writers Association in 1993.

== Works ==
=== Novels ===
- Skywalker (天行者)
  - English translation: The Sky Dwellers, translated by Emily Jones. Aurora Publishing, 2016.
- Political Lesson (政治课)
- Weifenglinlin (威风凛凛)
- Love Forever (爱到永远)

=== Novellas ===
- Fenghuangqin (凤凰琴)
- Qiufengzuile (秋风醉了)

=== Proses and poems ===
- A Drop of Water (一滴水有多深)

== Awards ==
- The Sky Dwellers – 8th Mao Dun Literature Prize (2011)
- Carrying A Load of Tea Go To Beijing – 1st Lu Xun Literary Prize
- 7th Zhuang Zhongwen Literary Prize

== Sources ==
- 刘醒龙：50年代写小说能买房 (in Chinese)
- 刘醒龙:很多教授加起来不如韩寒郭敬明受关注 (in Chinese)
