= Zhou Keqin =

Chinese writer

- 周克芹
- Born: 1937; Jianyang, Sichuan, China
- Died: 1990 (aged 52–53); Chengdu, Sichuan, China
- Education: Chengdu Institute of Agricultural Technology
- Occupation: Novelist
- Writing career
- Language: Chinese
- Period: 1963–1990
- Genre: Novel
- Subjects: Country and farmer
- Notable works: Xu Mao and his daughters
- Notable awards: Mao Dun Literary Prize; 1982 Xu Mao and his daughters
- Movement: Scar literature

Zhou Keqin (Chinese: 周克芹; pinyin: Zhōu Kèqín; 1937 – August 5, 1990) was a Chinese writer regarded as a representative of Scar literature. Born in Jianyang, Sichuan, he is famous in China for the 1979 novel Xu Mao and His Daughters, which was made into a movie in 1981 and which also won him the first-time Mao Dun Literature Prize, a prestigious literary award.

== Biography ==
Zhou graduated from Chengdu Agricultural Technology School in 1958 and then became a farmer in his hometown. He published his first work, At the Well, in 1963. Afterwards, he published many short stories in newspapers. In 1979, he completed the novel Xu Mao and His Daughters, about 200,000 characters in length, which, in realistic style, depicted the life of a farmer's family in a desolate village and reflected the impacts of many rural policies on the family. Zhou became a renowned writer nationwide in China for this novel and he was considered one of the leading figures in Scar Literature.

Zhou became the vice chairman of the Sichuan Writers Association in 1984 and he later served as a member of Chinese Writers Association 4th Council.

== Death ==
He died on August 5, 1990, in Chengdu, aged 53.
