= Wang Huo =

Chinese novelist and screenwriter (1924–2025)

- 王火
- Born: Wang Hongpu (王洪溥); 1 July 1924; Shanghai, China
- Died: 23 November 2025 (aged 101); Chengdu, Sichuan, China
- Education: Fudan University
- Occupation: Novelist
- Writing career
- Language: Chinese
- Period: 1943–2025
- Genres: Novel, screenplay, prose
- Notable works: War and People
- Notable awards: 4th Mao Dun Literature Prize; 1997 War and People

Wang Huo (Chinese: 王火; pinyin: Wāng Huǒ; 1 July 1924 – 23 November 2025) was a Chinese novelist and screenwriter. Wang was a member of the 5th and 6th National Committees of the Chinese People's Political Consultative Conference.

== Life and career ==
Wang was born in Shanghai on 1 July 1924, with his ancestral home in Rudong County, Jiangsu.

Wang started to publish works in 1943.

Wang joined the National Literature and Art Association in 1948. In the same year, he graduated from Fudan University. After graduation, Wang worked in the Shanghai Federation of Trade Unions. He was a member of the Chinese Communist Party.

After the founding of the Communist State, Wang worked in Laodong Publishing House (劳动出版社) as an editor.

In 1953, Wang was transferred to All-China Federation of Trade Unions, and he served as the chief editor of Chinese Worker (中国工人).

In 1961, Wang taught at a school in Linyi, Shandong.

Wang joined the China Writers Association in 1979.

In 1983, Wang was appointed an associate editor of Sichuan People's Publishing House (四川人民出版社) and the chief editor of Sichuan Literature and Art Publishing House (四川文艺出版社).

Wang retired in 1987, and died on 23 November 2025, at the age of 101.

== Works ==
=== Novellas ===
- Right of Privacy (隐私权)

=== Long-gestating novels ===
- War and People (战争和人)
- The Foreign Eighth Route Army (外国八路)
- The Biography of Jie Zhenguo (血染春秋——节振国传奇)
- Firelight in the Heavy Fog (浓雾中的火光)
- Xueji (雪祭)
- The Biography of Firefly (流萤传奇)
- Awakening to Truth (禅悟)

=== Short stories ===
- Meteor (流星)
- The General Strike (二七大罢工)

=== Proses and poems ===
- Xichuangzhu (西窗烛)

=== Screenplay ===
- The Moon and the Sea (明月天涯)
- The Foreign Eighth Route Army (外国八路)

== Awards ==
- War and People – 4th Mao Dun Literature Prize (1997)
