= Frog (novel) =

2009 novel by Mo Yan

Chinese first edition

Frog (Chinese: 蛙; pinyin: Wā) is a novel by Mo Yan, first released in 2009. The novel is about Gugu (姑姑 "paternal aunt"), the aunt of "Tadpole", the novel's narrator. Gugu performs various abortions after the One Child Policy is introduced. The novel discusses both the reasons why the policy was implemented and its consequences.

It was translated into English by Howard Goldblatt (Chinese: 葛浩文), translator of contemporary Chinese literature and former research professor in the Department of East Asian Languages and Cultures at the University of Notre Dame. He served as Mo Yan's longtime English translator.

In Mandarin Chinese the word for frog, 蛙 (wā), sounds similar to the sound made by a baby (娃 wā), and the narrator's name means "tadpole".

Janet Maslin of The New York Times wrote that the conflicts between the government abortion planners, who believe that they are doing the right thing, and the prospective parents makes Frog a "startlingly dramatic book". Steven Moore of The Washington Post wrote that since the novel includes scenes of anguish, Frog "is no polemic supporting the necessary if heartless one-child policy."

== Plot ==
Gugu, born in 1937, is the first modern midwife in Tadpole's town. She had fallen in love with an air force pilot in 1960, but the officer went to Taiwan. The novel is divided into five parts, each part being a letter by Tadpole to a Japanese professor. Following a recent visit the professor requests more information about his Aunt's career. Told through flashbacks interspersed with his reflections, Tadpole takes us through his memories of Gugu's life. Gugu, however, has her whole life changed when her fiance, a pilot, betrays the party and defects to Taiwan, China's biggest enemy. Gugu becomes a fierce defender of Communist policies, after she is suspected of sharing the counter-revolutionary behavior of her ex-fiance. In order to fix her reputation with her political relationship, she decides to ruthlessly implement the family planning policy that was in place at the time. With her hard work, she ends up becoming the director of the town's health clinic. Her relationship with her community ends up becoming sour, as she is involved in the death of two women by her forceful actions with family planning. Tadpole during his interactions with Gugu, loses his wife, due to a botched abortion, when it was found out that the IUD implanted as part of the policy after her first child, had been removed.

In the closing book of Frog, we are introduced to the play that Tadpole, now in his fifties, has written. Gugu, who is now in her late seventies and retired, lives in constant regret and guilt following her life as a midwife. She is plagued with the responsibility of the blood of the children and mothers that she believes is on her hands, but praised within her community and surrounding villages for her 'magical' hands. Setting aside the fame she had gained in her community, Gugu is disgusted with the play Tadpole has written on her life, as she believes she is a sinner.

We are then shown Chen Mei, the second daughter of Chen Bi, who had been artificially inseminated, searching for her baby. Crippled from fire and deemed insane by her community, Chen Mei has been cast into destituteness. Frantically searching for her baby, she meets Chen Bi, Little Lion, and a few others. She snatches a baby and flees with it in an attempt to keep the baby. We are then cut to a judgment scene over who is the 'true' mother, Little Lion or Chen Mei.

== Characters and Roles ==
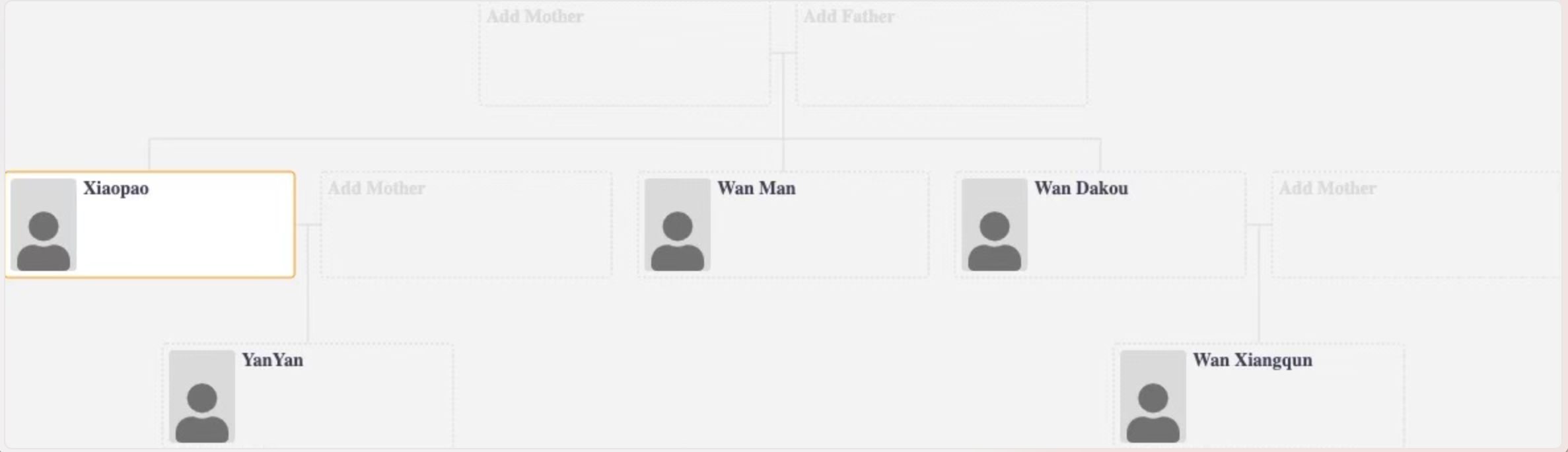
Family Tree

Tadpole (Xiaopao)- Gugu's nephew

Gugu (Wan Xin)- Midwife

Jin Xiu- Cousin of Xiapao and Xiao's business partner

Little Lion- Gugu's intern

Wan Dakou (Wan Kou)- Xiaopao eldest brother and father of Wan Xiangqun

Wan Liufu- Gugu's father

Wan Man- Xiapao's sister

Wan Xiangqun- Air force pilot and nephew of Xiapao

Wuguan- Xiaopao's cousin

YanYan- Xiapao's daughter

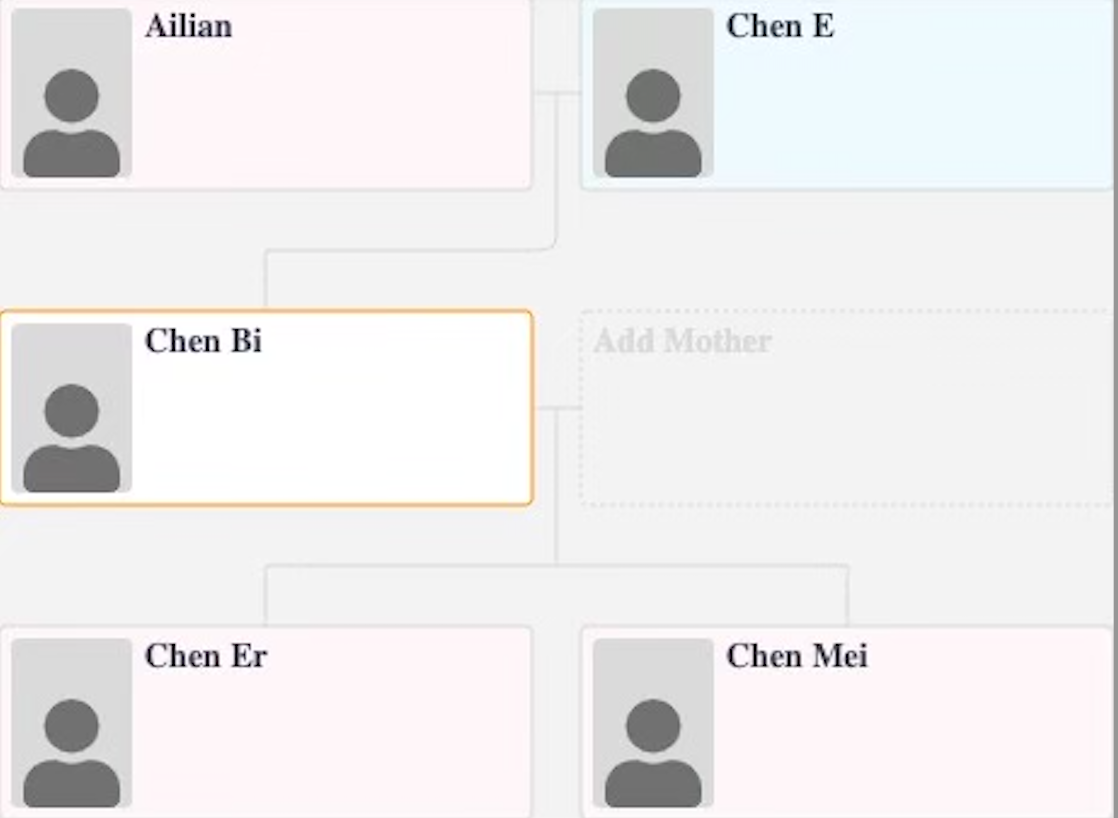
Chen Bi's Family Tree

Chen Bi's family

Ailian- Chen Bi's mother

Chen Bi- Xiaopao's classmate

Chen E- Chen Bi's father

Chen Er-Chen Bi's daughter

Chen Mei-Chen Bi's daughter

== Themes ==
The One-Child Policy

The One-Child Policy is a major topic throughout the novel. Gugu is depicted to be a government official who enforces the policy, becoming the director of the town's health clinic. Mo Yan used Gugu as an example to depict the consequences of having more than one child, as well as the force that was enacted on any illegal pregnancies and children, such as forced abortions. Mo Yan showed the policy throughout the novel in a non-biased format, showing characters to be for and against these actions. China during the time and in the present day has banned books, artworks, and other works that were considered to be against the Chinese Communist Party. The One-Child Policy was a concept that was considered a sensitive topic, having Yan be cautious about how he wrote about the ideology, as books are determined by whether books are approved, altered, or banned.

Sexism

Sexism was very common throughout the one child-policy, as women were pressured to marry and have children for the legacy of the policy - a country with a higher ratio of men and women and a decreasing working-age population. During this time, ultrasound gender tests were not allowed. If the mother were to have a girl, individuals would place them in a basket and leave her in the street, starting with an individual that lived throughout this time in China. Sexism was common before the one-child policy was in place, as during the 1930s, it was common to see the practices of female infanticide and abandonment. A study had estimated that in some provinces child abandonment went for one in ten female births in the 1990s. This caused many individuals to be considered "bootleg children" or "black children", as they would be denied public services, however, many would-be adopted, but would still have disadvantages in their education. Many girls, as well, were taken away and sent to orphanages in order to be adopted out of the country. Over 1.5 million children, most were girls, were adopted by North American and European families in the early 1990s.

Frogs

The use of frogs is an apparent theme seen throughout the novel. Due to the heavy censorship that has consistently been implemented in Chinese society, especially in Chinese media, Mo Yan had to take an alternative route to speak on taboo topics. Frogs throughout the novel are used metaphorically to address complex issues such as abortion. In the final book, as Gugu, the midwife and Tadpole's aunt reflects on her life and her possible harsh enforcement of the One-Child-Policy in her village, she uses frog metaphors to help describe her emotions. " Coated in blood, they wail and moan, accompanied by those frogs with missing legs and claws. Cries and croaks swirl together and cannot be distinguished, one from the other. They chase me around the yard." is written. Yan's metaphoric manner in the novel allows him to speak on complex topics banned with censorship in China while simultaneously criticizing the Chinese government and showing them the consequences the One Child Policy had on regular Chinese citizens, doctors, and communities through the novel.

== Reception ==
In 2011, the China Writers Association awarded Frog a Mao Dun Literature Prize.

Julia Lovell of The New York Times wrote that comparisons to The Dark Road by Ma Jian, also about abortions in China, would be inevitable; praising the final part of Frog, she argued that the two novels initially appear quite different but that both "describe a country that has lost its way, a land in which a repressive state has rendered individuals incapable of making independent moral judgments about political, economic and social behavior and in which women continue to suffer at the hands of reckless male politicians and son-fixated husbands." But Lovell also wrote, "Those anticipating an analysis of Gugu's innermost psychology will be disappointed. Throughout the book, Mo Yan's narrative attention darts here and there [...] Mo Yan has made his name and his fortune as a best-selling novelist. I sometimes wonder, though, if his heart lies in more visual, linguistically pared-down literary genres".

Isabel Hilton a London based writer and broadcaster who reports extensively from China and Hong Kong, reviewed Frog in The Guardian: as "Mo Yan's use of magic and fable has inspired comparisons to Gabriel García Márquez. For his characters the village bestiary of sprites and demons are everyday companions." Hilton also writes, "They are everyman, long-suffering and, on the whole, well disposed towards their fellow human beings. They have no great expectation of happiness, and in that they are generally proved right."

Jason Sheehan from NPR reviewed Frog and applauded Mo Yan for his controversial book about the politics of abortion, setting the environment in a small Chinese town. Sheehan wrote to NPR, "... It was written by a guy who holds the dubious honor of being the only Chinese Nobel laureate who hasn't left the country or been jailed by the government. Yan is a member of the Communist party. He's called a mouthpiece of the state by some Chinese dissidents".

Steve Moore, the author of "The Novel: An Alternative History", from The Washington Post reviews Frog as "Only recently has China relaxed its one-child policy somewhat, and "Frog" is both an invaluable record of that social experiment and another display of Mo Yan's attractively daring approach to fiction. The Nobel committee chose wisely". Moore applauded Yan's ability of showing emotional scenes throughout the novel, as Yan uses realism throughout his novels, making the conclusion of the book "fitting".
