= Yao Xueyin =

Chinese novelist

- 姚雪垠
- Born: Yao Guansan (姚冠三); 10 October 1910; Dengzhou, Henan, China
- Died: 29 April 1999 (aged 88); Beijing, China
- Education: Henan University
- Occupation: Novelist
- Spouse: Wang Meicai
- Children: 4
- Writing career
- Pen name: Xuehen (雪痕); Xue (雪); Chensi (沉思); Yao Dongbai (姚东白)
- Language: Chinese
- Period: 1935–1999
- Genre: Novel
- Subject: Historical novel
- Notable work: Li Zicheng
- Notable awards: Mao Dun Literature Prize; 1982 Li Zicheng

Yao Xueyin (Chinese: 姚雪垠; pinyin: Yáo Xuěyín; 10 October 1910 – 29 April 1999) was a Chinese novelist who was a member of China Writers Association. Yao was a member of the 5th, 6th, and 7th National Committee of the Chinese People's Political Consultative Conference. Yao used his fortune posthumously to institute the Yao Xueyin Historical Novel Prize (姚雪垠长篇历史小说奖).

== Biography ==
Yao was born into a family of landlord background in Dengzhou, Henan in 1910. In 1930, Yao was expelled for taking part in student movement from Henan University. In 1940s, Yao started to write the novel Li Zicheng.

In 1950s. Yao worked in Wuhan, and shortly taught at Central China Normal University. In 1957, Yao was labeled as a rightist by the government and he was sent to a farm to work. In 1961, he was rehabilitated by Mao Zedong, and he returned to Wuhan.

In 1963, Yao published his novel Li Zicheng volume 1 by the China Youth Publishing House (中国青年出版社).

During the Cultural Revolution, his novel Li Zicheng was denounced as a "giant poisonous weed". He was attacked by the Red Guards, but was protected from physical harm by Mao Zedong.

In 1977, Yao published his novel Li Zicheng volume 2, which won him the first-time Mao Dun Literature Prize, a prestigious literary award in China.

In 1999, Yao died in Beijing Fuxing Hospital (北京复兴医院).

== Works ==
=== Novellas ===
- Niu Quande and his Carrots (牛全德和红萝卜)

=== Long novels ===
- Li Zicheng volume 1 (李自成（第一卷）)
- Li Zicheng volume 2 (李自成（第二卷）)
- Li Zicheng volume 3 (李自成（第三卷）)
- Li Zicheng volume 4 (李自成（第四卷）)
- Li Zicheng volume 5 (李自成（第五卷）)
- When Spring Comes (春暖花开的时候)
- A Long Night (长夜)

== Personal life ==
At the age of 21, Yao married Wang Meicai (王梅彩). The couple had four children (three sons and one daughter).

Sons:

- Yao Haiyun (姚海云)
- Yao Haixing (姚海星)
- Yao Haitian (姚海天)

Daughter:

- Yao Haiyan (姚海燕)
