= Zhuwei =

Zhuwei may refer to:

- Zhuwei (麈尾), a "deer tail" in Chinese
- Zhuwei Community (朱圩社区), a community in Tianji Subdistrict, Panji District, Huainan, Anhui, China
- Zhuwei Elementary Schools
- Zhuwei Fish Harbor, a fishing port in Dayuan District, Taoyuan City, Taiwan
- Zhuwei metro station, a station of the Taipei Metro
- Zhuwei Tomb
- Zhuwei Road (竹圍路), a road in Puzi City, Chiayi County, Taiwan
- Zhuwei Village (竹圍村), a village in Mingjian Township, Nantou County, Taiwan
- Zhuwei Village (竹圍村), a village in Neipu Township, Pingtung County, Taiwan
- Zhuwei Village (竹圍村), a village in Pitou Township, Changhua County, Taiwan
- Zhuwei Village (竹圍里), a village in Puzi City, Chiayi County, Taiwan
- Zhuwei Village (朱圩村), a village in Shahe Town, Ganyu District, Lianyungang, Jiangsu, China
- Zhuwei Village (竹圍里), a village in West District, Chiayi City, Taiwan
- Zhuwei Village (竹圍里), a village in Yujing District, Tainan City, Taiwan
- Zhuwei Village (竹圍里), a village in Zhushan Township, Nantou County, Taiwan
- Mo Zhuwei (莫竹苇), one of daughter of the Chinese novelist Mo Yingfeng
- Town of Zhuwei (筑卫城), a town in Qingjiang county, Jiangxi province, China

== See also ==
- New Taipei Municipal Zhuwei High School, a high school in Tamsui District, New Taipei
- Zhu Wei, a Chinese artist
