= Qian Xiaoqian =

Chinese politician

- 钱小芊

Party Branch Secretary of China Writers Association
- In office December 2014 – June 2021
- Preceded by: Li Bing
- Succeeded by: Zhang Hongsen

Personal details
- Born: November 1955 (age 70) Qidong, Jiangsu, China
- Party: Chinese Communist Party
- Education: Renmin University of China

Chinese name
- Simplified Chinese: 钱小芊
- Traditional Chinese: 錢小芊
Transcriptions
Standard Mandarin
- Hanyu Pinyin: Qián Xiǎoqiān

Qian Xiaoqian (Chinese: 钱小芊; born November 1955) is a Chinese politician.

He is a representative of the 19th National Congress of the Chinese Communist Party and a member of the 19th Central Committee of the Chinese Communist Party. He is a member of the 13th National Committee of the Chinese People's Political Consultative Conference.

== Biography ==
Qian was born in Qidong, Jiangsu, in November 1955. During the Cultural Revolution, he worked at Shanghai Outpost Farm and then Shanghai Farm Administration from December 1973 to July 1978.

He joined the Chinese Communist Party (CCP) in October 1974, and entered the Statistics Bureau of Shanghai Municipal Planning Commission and Shanghai Municipal Price Bureau in July 1978.

In 1979, he was admitted to the Renmin University of China, majoring in history. After university in 1983, he was assigned to the Theoretical Bureau of the Publicity Department of the Chinese Communist Party. He worked in the Information Office of the State Council between December 1991 and April 2013, what he was promoted to its deputy director in February 2004. He also served as deputy director of the Cyberspace Administration of China from May 2011 to April 2013. He became deputy party branch secretary of China Writers Association in April 2013, rising to party branch secretary the next year. He concurrently served as vice chairman of China Writers Association from December 2016 to September 2021. In September 2021, he was appointed vice chairperson of the Culture, History and Study Committee of the National Committee of the Chinese People's Political Consultative Conference.

Party political offices
Preceded by Li Bing	Party Branch Secretary of China Writers Association; 2014–2021	Succeeded by Zhang Hongsen
