= Li Er (novelist) =

Chinese writer and scholar (born 1966)

- 李洱
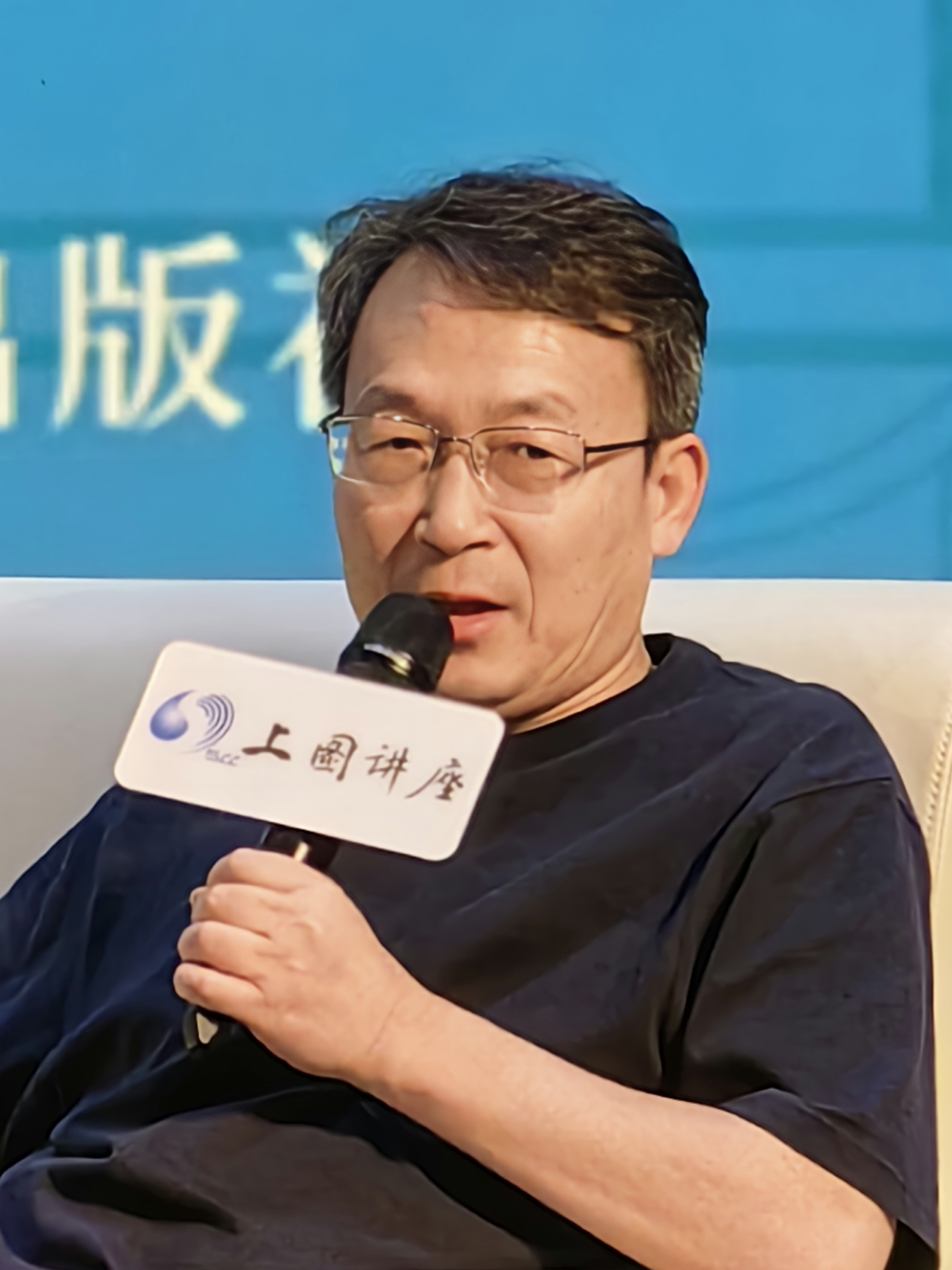
- Li in August 2023
- Born: 1966 (age 59–60); Jiyuan, Henan, China
- Education: East China Normal University
- Occupation: Novelist
- Children: 1
- Writing career
- Language: Chinese
- Period: 1987–present
- Genre: Novel
- Notable works: Cherries on a Pomegranate Tree; Coloratura; Brother Ying Wu
- Notable awards: 10th Mao Dun Literature Prize; 2019 Brother Ying Wu
- Literary movement: Native-soil literature

Li Er (Chinese: 李洱; pinyin: Lǐ Ěr; born 1966) is a Chinese novelist. He is best known for his novel Brother Ying Wu which won the 10th Mao Dun Literature Prize (2019), one of the most prestigious literature prizes in China. He is deputy editor-in-chief of Mangyuan magazine and director of the Research Department of the Chinese Modern Literature Museum. His works have been translated into English and German.

== Biography ==
Li was born in Jiyuan, Henan, in 1966, the year the ten-year Cultural Revolution broke out. In 1983, he was accepted to East China Normal University, where he majored in Chinese language and literature. In 1987, the year he graduated from university, Li published his first short story Gospel in Guandong Literature. After university, he taught at Zhengzhou Normal University. In 1993, his novella The Tutor Is Dead, was published. In 2002, Coloratura was published by People's Literature Publishing House, which explores the fate of the individual in contemporary China and the problematic quest for "historical truth". It has been translated into English by Jeremy Tiang. In 2005, Coloratura was nominated for the 6th Mao Dun Literature Prize. His other novel, Cherries on a Pomegranate Tree, was translated into German and attracted German Chancellor Angela Merkel's attention. When Merkel visited China in 2008, she gave it to Chinese Premier Wen Jiabao as a gift.

== Personal life ==
During the process of writing Brother Ying Wu, Li's mother became seriously ill just after Li had moved his family from Zhengzhou to Beijing. He and his younger brothers sought medical treatment for his mother in several major cities.

== Works ==
- 应物兄 [Brother Ying Wu] (in Chinese). Beijing: People's Literature Publishing House. 2018. ISBN 9787020147465.
- 石榴树上结樱桃 [A Cherry on a Pomegranate Tree] (in Chinese). Shanghai: Shanghai Literature and Art Publishing House. 2017. ISBN 9787532163816.
  - English translation: Cherries on a Pomegranate Tree. Translated by Haysom, Dave. Horsham: Sinoist Books. 2023. ISBN 9781838905552.
- 鬼子进村 [The Imperial Japanese Army Enters the Village] (in Chinese). Shanghai: Shanghai Literature and Art Publishing House. 2017. ISBN 9787532163786.
- 花腔 [Coloratura] (in Chinese). Shanghai: Shanghai Literature and Art Publishing House. 2017. ISBN 9787532163809.
  - English translation: Coloratura. Translated by Tiang, Jeremy. Norman: University of Oklahoma Press. 2019. ISBN 9780806144238.
- 儿女情长 [Be Immersed in Love] (in Chinese). Shanghai: Shanghai Literature and Art Publishing House. 2017. ISBN 9787532163755.
- 问答录 [Question and Answer] (in Chinese). Shanghai: Shanghai Literature and Art Publishing House. 2017. ISBN 9787532163793.
- 午后的诗学 [Afternoon Poetics] (in Chinese). Shanghai: Shanghai Literature and Art Publishing House. 2017. ISBN 9787532163779.
- 导师死了 [The Tutor Is Dead] (in Chinese). Shanghai: Shanghai Literature and Art Publishing House. 2017. ISBN 9787532163762.
- 喑哑的声音 [A Hoarse Voice] (in Chinese). Shanghai: Shanghai Literature and Art Publishing House. 2017. ISBN 9787532163748.

== Awards ==
- 2003 Coloratura won the 1st Ding Jun Double Year Prize for Literature
- Coloratura won the 3rd Red River Literature Award
- Cherries on a Pomegranate Tree won the 4th Red River Literature Award and 10th Zhuang Zhongwen Literature Award
- 2019 Brother Ying Wu won the 17th Chinese Literature Media Award
- 2019 Brother Ying Wu won the 10th Mao Dun Literature Prize
- 2020 Served as final judge member of the 6th Yu Dafu Novel Award
- 2021 Elected as a member of the 10th National Committee of the Chinese Writers Association
