= Xu Xingye =

Chinese novelist

- 徐兴业
- Born: 1917; Shaoxing, Zhejiang, China
- Died: 1990 (aged 72–73); Shanghai, China
- Education: Wuxi Academy of the Traditional Chinese Culture
- Occupation: Novelist
- Spouse: Zhou Yunqin
- Children: 2
- Writing career
- Language: Chinese
- Period: 1980–1990
- Genre: Novel
- Notable work: Broken Golden Bowl
- Notable awards: 3rd Mao Dun Literature Prize; 1991 Broken Golden Bowl

Xu Xingye (simplified Chinese: 徐兴业; traditional Chinese: 徐興業; pinyin: Xú Xīngyè; 1917 – 1990) was a Chinese novelist. One of his works, Broken Golden Bowl, won the Mao Dun Literature Prize, a prestigious literature award in China.

== Biography ==
Xu was born in Shaoxing, Zhejiang in 1917. He graduated from Wuxi Academy of the Traditional Chinese Culture (无锡国学专修学校) in 1937. After graduation, he worked in Shanghai.

Xu started to publish works in 1980. He died in Shanghai in 1990.

== Works ==
=== Novels ===
- Broken Golden Bowl (金瓯缺)

== Awards ==
- Broken Golden Bowl – 3rd Mao Dun Literature Prize (1991)

== Personal life ==
Xu married Zhou Yunqin (周韵琴), her father was Zhou Zongliang (周宗良), a rich merchant in Shanghai. The couple had two sons, Xu Yuanzhang (徐元章) and Xu Yuanjian (徐元健).
