= Zong Pu =

Chinese novelist

- 宗璞
- Born: Feng Zhongpu (冯钟璞); July 26, 1928 (age 98); Beijing, China
- Education: Nankai University; Tsinghua University
- Occupation: Novelist
- Parent: Feng Youlan (father)
- Writing career
- Language: Chinese
- Period: 1948–present
- Genres: Novel, prose
- Notable work: Eastern Concealment
- Notable awards: 6th Mao Dun Literature Prize; 2001 Eastern Concealment

Chinese name
- Chinese: 宗璞
Transcriptions
Standard Mandarin
- Hanyu Pinyin: Zōng Pú

Feng Zhongpu (born 26 July 1928), better known by her pen name Zong Pu, is a Chinese novelist. She won the Mao Dun Literature Prize for her 2001 novel, Eastern Concealment.

Born in Beijing, Zong is the daughter of Feng Youlan, a prominent philosopher, and she grew up on various university campuses. Zong graduated from Tsinghua University in 1951. She became a member of the China Writers Association in 1962.

== Works ==
- Hong dou (Red Beans), 1957
- Xian shang de meng (Dream on the Strings), 1978
- 'Sanheng shi' (Everlasting Rock), 1980. Translated by Aimee Lykes as The Everlasting Rock, 1998. ISBN 978-0894107825.
- shu shui (Who am I), 1979
- (A Head in the Marshes), 1985
- Nan du ji (Heading South), 1988
- Dong cang ji (Hiding in the East), 2001

== Translated works (English) ==
- Departure for the South
- Eastern Concealment
