= Li Bing (writer) =

Chinese politician (1949–2024)

Li Bing (November 1949 – June 17, 2024 Chinese: 李冰), native of Anda, Heilongjiang, was a writer of People's Republic of China.

== Biography ==
In June 1972, Li Bing joined the Chinese Communist Party (CCP). He was deputy secretary of the Communist Youth League of Heilongjiang Province from June 1975 to November 1978. He was Officer, deputy director, Director of the Office of the Central Committee of the Communist Youth League, deputy director of the Research Office, and Director of the Youth Work Department successively from November 1978 to December 1989. He was Youth Work Department Director of the Communist Youth League from December 1989. He was deputy director of the State Council Information Office and Central Office of Publicity for Foreign Countries from January 1994 to November 2008. From November 2008 to December 2014, he successively served as Secretary of the Party Group, Vice-chairman, Secretary of the Secretariat, and Secretary of the Party Group of the Chinese Writers' Association (CWA). He was re-voted as vice-chairman of the Chinese Writers' Association (CWA), from December 2014 to December 2016. Li Bing served as an alternate of the 18th Central Committee of the Chinese Communist Party.

He died in Beijing on June 17, 2024, aged 75 years.
