= Zhang Ping (writer) =

Chinese novelist and politician

- 张平
- Born: November 1953 (age 72–73); Xinjiang County, Shanxi, China
- Education: Shanxi Normal University
- Occupations: Novelist, politician
- Writing career
- Language: Chinese
- Period: 1981–present
- Genre: Novel
- Notable work: The Choice
- Notable awards: 5th Mao Dun Literature Prize; 2000 The Choice

Zhang Ping (simplified Chinese: 张平; traditional Chinese: 張平; pinyin: Zhāng Píng; born November 1953) is a Chinese novelist and politician who served as Vice Governor of Shanxi between January 2008 and January 2013. Zhang served as vice president of the China Democratic League and vice president of China Writers Association between 2002 and 2008. Zhang was a member of the 9th, 10th, and 11th National Committee of the Chinese People's Political Consultative Conference.

== Biography ==
Zhang was born in Xinjiang County, Shanxi in November 1953. He entered Shanxi Normal University in 1978, majoring in Chinese language at the Department of Chinese Language and Culture, where he graduated in 1982.

Zhang started to publish works in 1981. Zhang joined the China Writers Association in 1985.

From 1982 to 1986, Zhang worked in Pingyang Literature and Art (平阳文艺) as an editor.

From 2002 to 2008, Zhang served as vice president of the China Democratic League, and vice president of the China Writers Association.

== Works ==
=== Novels ===
- Decision (抉择)
  - English translation: The Choice. Translated by James Trapp. Horsham: Sinoist Books, 2024.
- Skynet (天网)
- The Murderer (凶犯)
- Boys and Girls (少男少女)
- Ambush From All Sides (十面埋伏)
- National Cadre (国家干部)

=== Reportage ===
- Orphan's Tears (孤儿泪)

== Awards ==
- Decision – 5th Mao Dun Literature Prize (2000)
- 6th Zhuang Zhongwen Literature Prize
