= Huo Da =

Chinese writer of Hui ethnicity (born 1945)

- 霍达
- Born: 26 November 1945 (age 80); Beijing, China
- Occupation: Novelist
- Writing career
- Language: Chinese
- Period: 1980–present
- Genre: Novel
- Notable work: The Jade King
- Notable awards: Mao Dun Literature Prize; 1991 The Jade King

Huo Da (simplified Chinese: 霍达; traditional Chinese: 霍達; pinyin: Huò Dá; born 26 November 1945) is a Chinese writer of Hui ethnicity. She is also a film editor. Her Hui name is Fa Tumai (Chinese: 法图迈; pinyin: Fǎ Túmài). One of her works, The Jade King, won the Mao Dun Literature Prize in 1991. It has been translated into English, French, Arabic and Urdu.

Her most famous novel, and the only one to be translated into English, was the 1988 The Jade King, which chronicled the history of three generations of a family of Muslim jade carvers in Beijing; it provoked controversy for its positive attitude towards market entrepreneurialism and its suggestion that the Han in Beijing negatively stereotype the Hui for their poverty and lack of education, while they do not have the same attitude towards the Manchu.

== Biography ==
Huo Da was born into a family of scholars on 26 November 1945 in Beijing. She graduated from Beijing Construction College in 1966. And then she engaged in translation work for many years. In 1976, she became a film editor at Beijing Film Studio. In 1978, she was transferred to Beijing television art center and started her professional writing career.

== Works ==
- The Jade King (穆斯林的葬礼) (1982)
- I'm not a Hunter (我不是猎人) (1982)
- Red (红尘) (1985)
- War (国殇) (1988)
- The split Sky (补天裂) (1997)
  - 霍达文集 (Collected Works of Huo Da). Beijing October Literature and Arts Publishing House, August 1999. ISBN 7530205951.
- 红尘 (Red Dust). Beijing October Literature and Arts Publishing House, April 2005. ISBN 7530207873.
- 万家忧乐 (The Worry and Joy of Thousands of Households)
- 龙驹 (Dragon Foal)
- Magpie Bridge
