= Liu Yumin =

Chinese novelist

- 刘玉民
- Born: February 1951 (age 75); Jinan, Shandong, China
- Occupation: Novelist
- Writing career
- Language: Chinese
- Period: 1971–present
- Genres: Novel, prose, drama, reportage
- Notable work: Unsettled Autumn
- Notable awards: 4th Mao Dun Literature Prize; 1998 Unsettled Autumn

Liu Yumin (simplified Chinese: 刘玉民; traditional Chinese: 劉玉民; pinyin: Liǘ Yùmín; born February 1951) is a Chinese novelist who was the vice president of Shandong Literature and Art Association.

== Biography ==
Liu was born into a family of farming background in Jinan, Shandong. His father died young, his mother died in the Cultural Revolution.

After meddle school, Liu worked in a local people's commune.

Liu joined the People's Liberation Army in 1970 and he started to publish works in 1971. From 1971 to 1981, Liu was serving in the Jinan Military Region.

In 1982, Liu was transferred to Jinan Literature and Art Association. He was appointed the president of Jinan Writers Association, the vice president of Shandong Literature and Art Association, and the president of Shandong Painting Academy.

== Works ==
=== Dramas ===
- The Sunlight (呼唤阳光)
- The Four Women (四个女人两台戏)
- The Yellow River (黄河之水天上来)

=== Novels ===
- Unsettled Autumn (骚动之秋)
- The Shofar (羊角号)
- Guolongbing (过龙兵)
- Journey to the East (八仙东游记)

=== Reportages ===
- The Dream of City (都市之梦)
- Biography of the Oriental Man (东方奇人传)

=== Proses and poems ===
- Loving You Every Day (爱你生命的每一天)
- Shandong Zhuzhi Poem (山东竹枝词)

== Awards ==
- Unsettled Autumn – 4th Mao Dun Literature Prize (1998)
