= Mo Yingfeng =

Chinese novelist

- 莫应丰
- Born: January 12, 1938; Yiyang, Hunan, China
- Died: February 17, 1989 (aged 51); Changsha, Hunan, China
- Resting place: Changsha, Hunan, China
- Education: Hubei Arts College
- Occupation: Novelist
- Spouse(s): Li Mingxiu (1965–1981), Ouyang Huiling (1981–1989)
- Children: Mo Zhuwei Mo Zhuqin
- Writing career
- Language: Chinese
- Period: 1972–1989
- Genres: Novel; short story; essay
- Notable works: General's Chant (将军吟); Peach Blossom Utopia (桃源梦)
- Notable awards: 1st Mao Dun Literature Prize; 1982 General's Chant
- Literary movement: Scar literature; Roots-seeking literature

Mo Yingfeng (simplified Chinese: 莫应丰; traditional Chinese: 莫應豐; pinyin: Mò Yìngfēng; 12 January 1938 – 17 February 1989) was a Chinese novelist best known for his novel General's Chant, which won the Mao Dun Literature Prize in 1982. He served as the member of China Writers Association and held leadership roles in Hunan Writers Association and Hunan Literature and Art Association.

== Biography ==
Mo Yingfeng was born in Yiyang, Hunan in 1938. into a poor rural family. His early life was marked by hardship, which later became an important influence on his writing.

He studied music at Hubei Arts College before joining the People's Liberation Army in 1961, where he worked in a military cultural troupe in Guangzhou Military Region. During the Cultural Revolution, he experienced political persecution, an experience that deeply shaped his later literary perspective.

Mo began publishing fiction in the early 1970s. His most significant work, the novel General's Chant, was written during the final years of the Cultural Revolution, a period when literary expression was subject to strict political constraints. The work was later serialized in 1979 and published as a novel in 1980. Widely regarded as a critical reflection on the era, it won the Mao Dun Literature Prize in 1982.

In the 1980s, Mo continued to write extensively, producing a number of novellas and short stories. His later works, including The Peach Blossom Utopia, engage with regional culture and have been interpreted as dystopian allegories, and are often associated with the roots-seeking literary movement.

Mo died in Changsha in February 1989.

== Works ==
=== Novels ===
- General's Chant (将军吟)
- Peach Blossom Utopia (桃源梦）
- The Wind (风)
- The Soldiers' Journey Through the Mountains (小兵闯大山)
- The Goddess of Beauty (美神)

== Awards ==
- General's Chant – 1st Mao Dun Literature Prize (1982)

== Personal life ==
Mo was born into a poor rural family in Taojiang, Hunan. He was married twice. In 1965, he married Li Mingxiu, with whom he had two daughters. The marriage ended in divorce in 1981. Later that year, he married Ouyang Huiling, and remained with her until his death in 1989.

In addition to his literary work, Mo had a background in music and was trained in composition at Hubei Arts College. He was also known for his interest in traditional Chinese arts, including calligraphy and ink painting.
