= Xiong Zhaozheng =

Chinese writer

- 熊召政
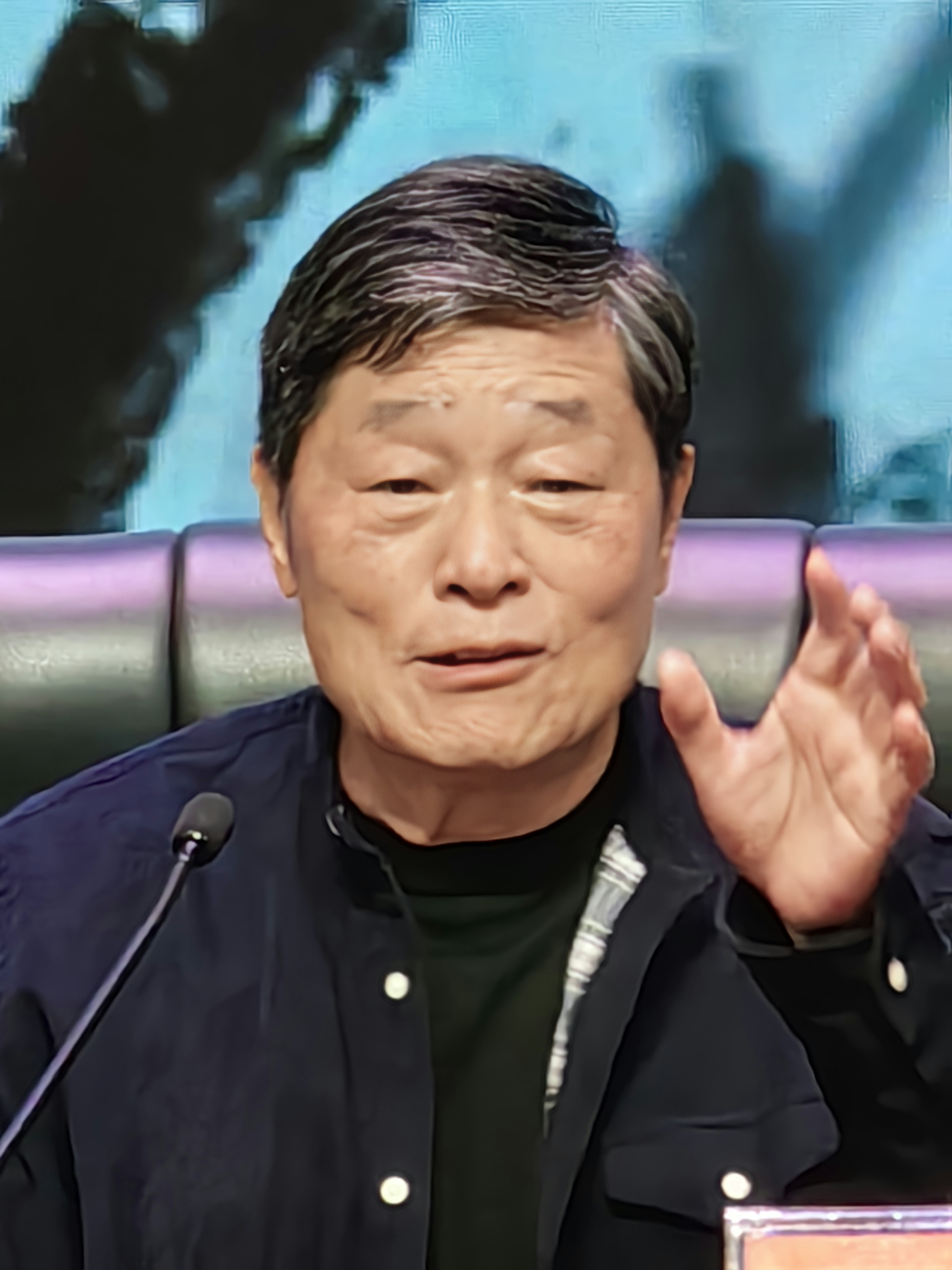
- Born: December 1953 (age 72); Yingshan County, Hubei, China
- Education: Wuhan University
- Occupation: Novelist
- Writing career
- Language: Chinese
- Period: 1973–present
- Genre: Novel
- Notable work: Zhang Juzheng
- Notable awards: 6th Mao Dun Literature Prize; 2005 Zhang Juzheng

Xiong Zhaozheng (Chinese: 熊召政; pinyin: Xióng Zhāozhèng; born December 1953) is a Chinese novelist.

== Biography ==
Xiong was born in Yingshan County, Hubei in December 1953. He worked in Yingshan Culture Centre (英山文化馆) by age 22. Xiong started to publish works in 1973.

In 1981, Xiong was transferred from Yingshan County to Wuhan. From 1984 to 1986, Xiong served as an associate editor in Changjiang Literature and Art.

In 1993, Xiong started to write his historical novel, Zhang Juzheng, which won the Mao Dun Literature Prize in 2005.

== Works ==
=== Novellas ===
- Drunkard (醉汉)

=== Novels ===
- Zhang Juzheng (张居正)

=== Proses and poems ===
- A Song for My Country (献给祖国的歌)
- In the Mountains (在深山)
- A Song for the Girl (为少女而歌)
- Magic Bottle (魔瓶)

== Awards ==
- Zhang Juzheng – 6th Mao Dun Literature Prize (2005)
