= Chu Chunqiu =

Chinese novelist

- 楚春秋
- Born: Xu Guixiang (徐贵祥); December 27, 1959 (age 66); Huoqiu County, Anhui, China
- Education: People's Liberation Army Arts College
- Occupation: Novelist
- Writing career
- Language: Chinese
- Period: 1994–present
- Genre: Novel
- Notable work: Sky of History
- Notable awards: 6th Mao Dun Literature Prize; 2005 Sky of History

Xu Guixiang (simplified Chinese: 徐贵祥; traditional Chinese: 徐貴祥; pinyin: Xú Guìxiáng; born 27 December 1959), better known by his pen name Chu Chunqiu (楚春秋), is a Chinese novelist. Xu was a member of the 7th, 8th, 12th National Committee of the Chinese People's Political Consultative Conference.

== Biography ==
Xu was born in Huoqiu County, Anhui in December 1959. In 1978, Xu left Anhui to Henan, where he was drafted into the People's Liberation Army and served for 16 years.

Xu graduated from People's Liberation Army Arts College in 1991, where he majored in literature.

In 1994, Xu was transferred to People's Liberation Army Publishing House. Xu later joined the China Writers Association in 1998.

== Works ==
=== Novellas ===
- Scarless Bullet (弹道无痕)
- Easy to March (潇洒行军)
- Decisive Battle (决战)

=== Novels ===
- Elevation (仰角)
- Sky of History (历史的天空)
- Height (高地)

== Awards ==
- Sky of History – 6th Mao Dun Literature Prize (2005)
