= Wang Xufeng =

Chinese writer and tea expert

- 王旭烽
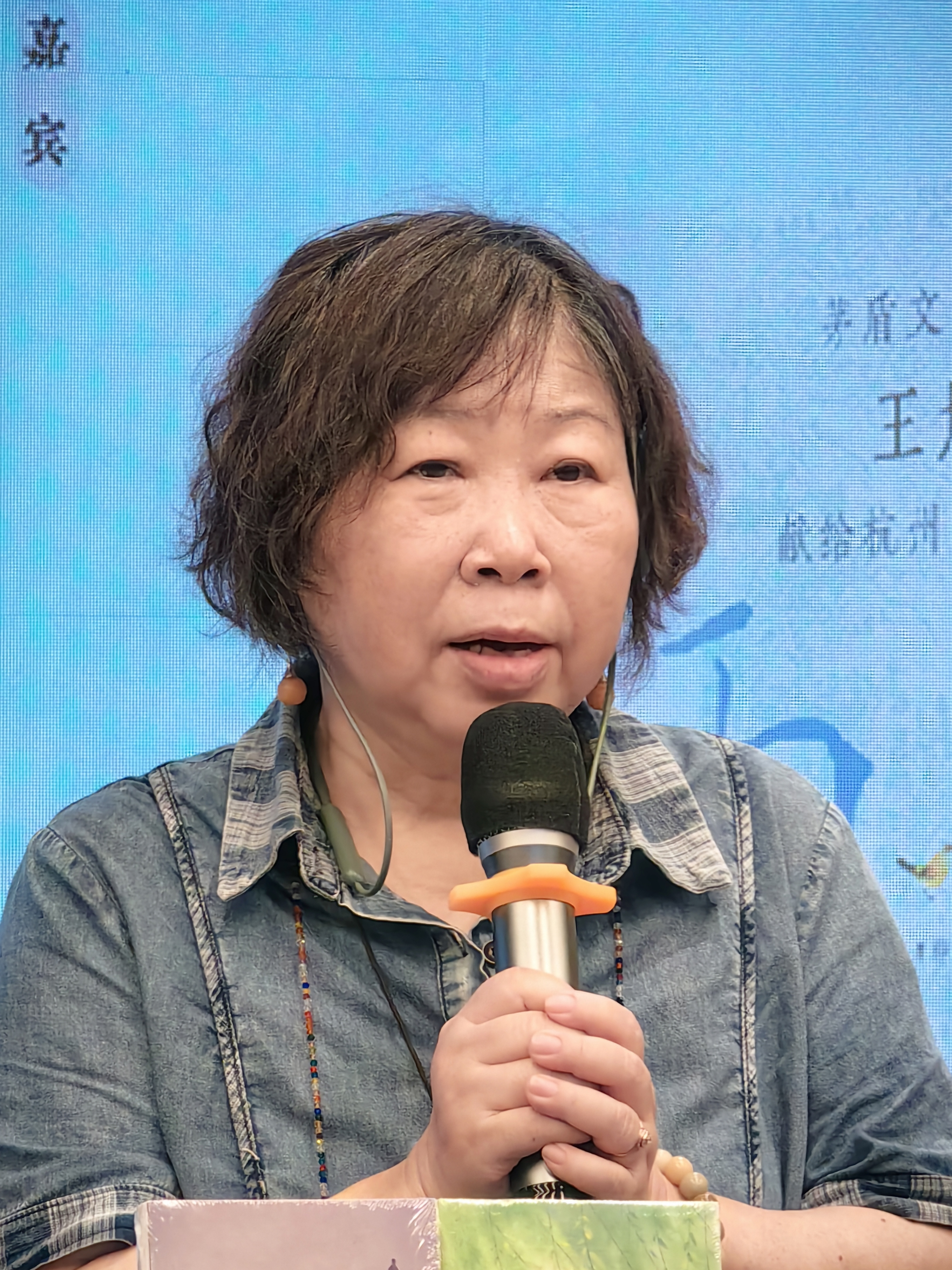
- Wang at Shanghai Book Fair
- Born: February 1955 (age 71); Jiaxing, Zhejiang, China
- Education: Hangzhou University
- Occupation: Novelist
- Writing career
- Language: Chinese
- Period: 1982 - present
- Genre: Novel
- Notable work: Trilogy of the Tea Masters
- Notable awards: Mao Dun Literature Prize; 2000 Trilogy of the Tea Masters

Wang Xufeng (Chinese: 王旭烽; pinyin: Wáng Xùfēng; born 1955) is a Chinese writer and tea expert. She is a recipient of the Chinese Mao Dun Literature Prize.

== Biography ==
Wang's ancestral hometown was in Tongshan, Jiangsu Province. Wang was born in Pinghu, Zhejiang Province in February 1955. She studied in the Department of History of Hangzhou University (currently Zhejiang University) between 1978 and 1982. After graduation, Wang taught at Hangzhou 14th Middle School. She also worked in a Hangzhou local factory manufacturing radio technology.

Wang is currently a researcher at China Tea Museum, a professor at Zhejiang Forestry University, and vice president of the Zhejiang Writers Association.

== Works ==
Wang won the 5th Mao Dun Literature Prize for Trilogy of the Tea Masters. The work took her ten years to write and is considered not only a story but also a scholarly work. The story is set against the history of China and deals with subjects like the Cultural Revolution. The theme of the book is the victory of culture over violence. The award was made on November 11, 2000 in Tongxiang, Zhejiang Province, where Mao Dun was born.

- 《茶人三部曲》 (Trilogy of the Tea Masters)
  - 《南方有嘉木》 "The Story of the Carefree Tea Mansion"
  - 《不夜之候》
  - 《筑草为城》

Wang has also done many studies on tea and tea culture, such as:

- 《茶文化通论》 (Essays of Tea Culture)
