= Liu Sifen =

Chinese novelist and painter (born 1944)

- 刘斯奋
- Born: January 1944 (age 82); Wuzhou, Guangxi, China
- Education: Sun Yat-Sen University
- Occupations: Novelist, painter
- Writing career
- Language: Chinese
- Period: 1984–present
- Genre: Novel
- Notable work: White Gate Willow
- Notable awards: 4th Mao Dun Literature Prize; 1997 White Gate Willow

Liu Sifen (simplified Chinese: 刘斯奋; traditional Chinese: 劉斯奮; pinyin: Liǘ Sīfèn; born January 1944) is a Chinese novelist and painter who was the president of Guangdong Literature and Art Association.

== Biography ==
Liu was born in Wuzhou, Guangxi in January 1944. In 1946, his family moved to British Hong Kong. After the founding of the PRC, his family settled in Guangzhou, Guangdong in 1951.

Liu graduated from Guangzhou First School (广州市第一中学) in 1962, he entered Sun Yat-Sen University, majoring in Chinese language.

In 1966, Mao Zedong launched the Cultural Revolution, Liu worked in Taishan County as a farmer, at the same time, he studied oil painting and gouache under Hao Jiaxian (郝佳贤).

In 1970, Liu was transferred from Taishan County to Ding'an County, Hainan.

In 1975, Liu returned to Guangzhou, he worked in Guangdong Provincial Party Committee Propaganda Department (广东省委宣传部), and he began to research Chinese Culture.

Liu started to write novel White Gate Willow in 1984.

In 1989, Liu studied Chinese painting.

In 1995, Liu was appointed the director of Guangdong Artists Association (广东省美术家协会) and the president of Guangdong Literature and Art Association (广东省文联).

In 2003, Liu served as the president of Guangdong Painting Academy (广东画院). At the same year, Liu joined the Chinese Calligraphy Association (中国书法协会).

== Works ==
=== Novel ===
- White Gate Willow (白门柳)

== Awards ==
- White Gate Willow – 4th Mao Dun Literature Prize (1997)
