= Li Peifu =

Chinese novelist (born 1953)

- 李佩甫
- Born: October 1953 (age 72); Xuchang, Henan, China
- Education: Henan Radio and Television University
- Occupation: Novelist
- Writing career
- Language: Chinese
- Period: 1978–present
- Genre: Novel
- Notable work: Book of Life
- Notable awards: 9th Mao Dun Literature Prize; 2015 Book of Life

Li Peifu (Chinese: 李佩甫; pinyin: Lǐ Pèifǔ; born October 1953) is a Chinese novelist best known for his novel Book of Life, which won him China's top literature prize: Mao Dun Literature Prize, in 2015. Li is a member of the Chinese Communist Party and the China Writers Association. He was selected as a National First-class Writer by the Chinese government, and enjoys the special subsidy of the State Council.

== Biography ==
Li was born into a worker's family, in Xuchang, Henan, in October 1953. He started to publish works in 1978, after the Cultural Revolution. He graduated from Henan Radio and Television University in 1984, where he majored in Chinese language and literature. After graduation, he worked at Xuchang Municipal Bureau of Culture and later became president of the Henan Writers Association and Henan Literature and Art Association. On August 16, 2015, he was awarded the Mao Dun Literature Prize for his novel Book of Life. His most influential work is Book of Life, which he finished in 2011, and which won him the prestigious Mao Dun Literature Prize in 2015. Book of Life is also the finale of his Plains Trilogy, after the 1999 Door of the Sheepfold and the 2003 The Light of the Cities.

== Works ==
=== Novellas ===
- Black Dragonfly (黑蜻蜓)
- Cunhun (村魂)
- The Countryside (田园)
- Collected Works of Li Peifu (李佩甫文集)

=== Novels ===
- The 17th Generation Great-Great-Grandson of Li Family (李氏家族第十七代玄孙)
- Golden House (金屋)
- Urban White Paper (城市白皮书)
- Door of the Sheepfold (羊的门)
- The Light of the Cities (城的灯)
- Book of Life (生命册)
- Graft (平原客), trans. James Trapp (Sinoist Books, 2022)

=== Telescript ===
- * The Story of Ying River (颍河故事)
- * Ordinary Story (平平常常的故事)
- * Memorable Years: Stories of Red Flag Canal (难忘岁月——红旗渠的故事)
- * Shen Fengmei (申凤梅)

== Awards ==
1994 Zhaung Zhongwen Literature Prize

2012 Book of Life – People's Literature Award

2015 Book of Life – Mao Dun Literature Prize
