= Zhang Jie (writer) =

Chinese novelist and short-story writer (1937–2022)

- 张洁 (張潔)
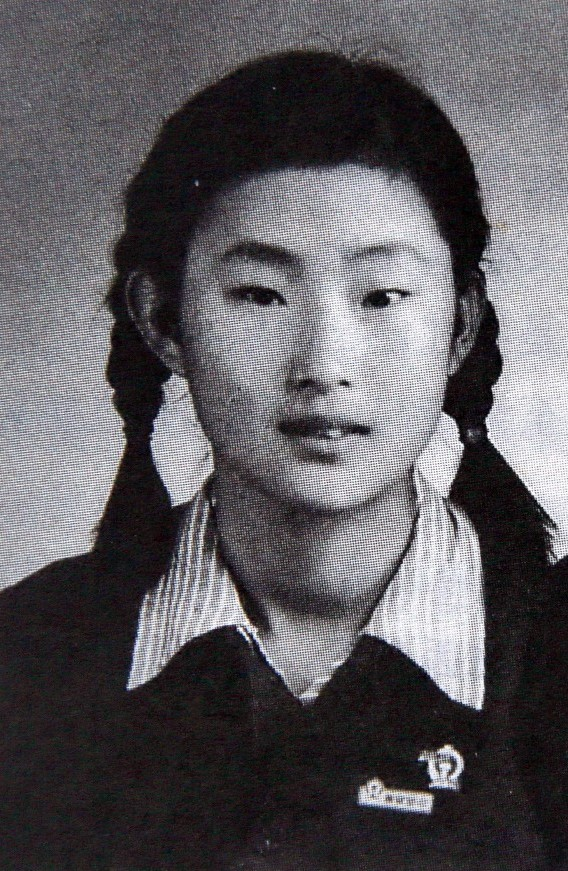
- Zhang Jie in her youth, sometime after 1946. She published her first novel in 1978.
- Born: 27 April 1937; Beijing, China
- Died: 21 January 2022 (aged 84); New York, U.S.
- Education: Renmin University of China
- Occupation: Novelist
- Writing career
- Language: Chinese
- Period: 1960–2022
- Notable work: Leaden Wings
- Notable awards: 2nd Mao Dun Literature Prize; 1985 Leaden Wings; 6th Mao Dun Literature Prize; 2005 Wordless

Zhang Jie (simplified Chinese: 张洁; traditional Chinese: 張潔; pinyin: Zhāng Jié; Wade–Giles: Chang Chieh, 27 April 1937 – 21 January 2022) was a Chinese novelist and short-story writer. She also co-wrote a biography of the film director Wu Zuguang in 1986. She worked on writing different kinds of books for or with young protagonists; these types of works are included in junior and senior high school textbooks in China. She was one of China's first feminist writers.

Zhang Jie mainly wrote on the themes of "people" and "love"; she often emphasized the emotions and relationships between mother and daughter, which was formed mainly by early poverty and the fierce protection of her mother, who died in 1991. The Person Who Loved Me the Most on Earth is Gone is a long story recounting the last eighty days and nights of her mother's life. She remembered her mother's submission, dependence and forbearance to her, and her consideration, complaint, and regret to her mother. This novel is a simple and unpretentious expression of the love between mother and daughter.

Her novel Leaden Wings was translated into German in 1982 and published in England in 1987 by Virago Press. She was awarded the Mao Dun Literature Prize in 1985 for Leaden Wings and in 2005 for Wordless, making her the first writer to receive the award twice. She is the only writer who has won the Mao Dun Literature Price twice, and is one of the most influential writers in contemporary China. Zhang Jie was a representative of female writers in contemporary China. In her words, she created many female images with different life paths and destinies, and explored the situation of women in contemporary China from her unique perspective.

== Biography ==
=== Early life ===
Zhang Jie was born in Beijing on April 27, 1937, and was raised by her mother in a village in Fushun, in Liaoning Province. Zhang Jie was born in a modest civil-servant family. Her parents were separated when she was very young, after which she lived with her mother and took her mother's last name. Zhang and her mother were dependent on each other and spent long, miserable years in the turbulent times. Her mother worked as a teacher in the village elementary school and was forced to work as a servant and a factory mail-woman. Zhang was fond of music and literature when she was in elementary school and middle school.

In 1960, she graduated from the Department of Statistics in Renmin University of China and went to work for the First Ministry of Machinery Industry. Zhang married a singer in the theatrical work unity. They had a daughter called Tang Di before divorcing in 1969. During the Cultural Revolution, she was sent to the "May 7 cadre school" and returned to Beijing and the First Ministry of Machinery Industry in 1972. Zhang endured many pains in her personal life; she supported a family of three generations of women for a long time with her perseverance.

Zhang began writing after the Cultural Revolution. She published her first novel, The Child of the Forest, in 1978. Published in Beijing Literature and Art, the novel immediately attracted the attention of the literary world, and won the Best Short Stories. In the following year, she published a number of short stories and joined the Chinese Writer's Association. Zhang joined the Communist Party in 1980. The novel Leaden Wings, published in April 1981, immediately aroused strong reactions and controversies. In 1982, she joined the International PEN China Center and accompanied a delegation of Chinese writers to the United States to attend the first Sino-American Writers' Conference; she was the vice chairman of the Beijing Writers' Association. She read her works in Berlin, Paris, Vienna, and other places. Leaden Wings was reissued by the People's Literature Publishing House in July 1984 and was well received by the literary community and won the 2nd Mao Dun Literature Prize of 1985. From December 1984 to January 1985, Zhang attended the Fourth Congress of the Chinese Writer's Association. By 1986, she was the first writer of the new period to win three national awards. Some of her works have been translated into foreign languages and distributed around the world.

=== Personal life and death ===
Zhang died in New York State on January 21, 2022, at the age of 84.

=== Awards ===
- Best Short Stories of 1978 --- The Child of the Forest
- Best Short Stories of 1979 --- Who Knows how to live
- Best Short Stories of 1983 --- The Time is not yet ripe
- Best Novellas of 1983–1984 --- Emerald (Zu Mulü)
- 2nd Mao Dun Literature Prize of 1985 --- Leaden Wings
- 6th Mao Dun Literature Prize of 2005 --- Without A World

== Main works ==
- The Child of the Forest (Cong senlin li laide haizi) (1978)
- Love Must Not be Forgotten (1979)
- Leaden Wings (沉重的翅膀) (1981)
- The Ark (1982)
- On a Green Lawn (1983)
- Emerald (1984)
- If Nothing Happens, Nothing Will (1986)
- Only One Sun (1988)
- As Long As Nothing Happens, Nothing Will (translated short stories, 1988)
- A Chinese Woman in Europe (1989)
- You are a Friend of my Soul (1990)
- Fever (Shang Huo) (1991)
- Interior Heat (1992)
- In the Twilight (1994)
- The Person Who Loved Me the Most on Earth is Gone (Shijieshang zui teng wo de nage ren qu le) (世界上最疼我的那个人去了) (1994)
- Why... in the First Place? (1994)
- A Collection of Proses (1995)
- Oversea Travels (1995)
- Wordless (Wu Zi) (无字) (2002)

=== Introduction of works ===
==== The Child of the Forest (从森林里来的孩子) ====
This story takes place during the Cultural Revolution. Published in 1978, it was Zhang's first work. It is a work of Scar literature, a genre describing the suffering of the Cultural Revolution. It is about the student Sun Changning, the son of a lumberjack, who travels thousands of miles to take an examination in the Central Conservatory of Music in order to please his teacher, one of the most talented musicians of the period. The protagonist, Sun Changning, is the son of a lumberjack. Although Sun lives in the forest, he has to be branded with "scars" during the Cultural Revolution. In this novel, Zhang wants to express the belief that art is one of the things that can sustain the human spirit during the Cultural Revolution, but only if the belief in art is honest and not evil.

==== Leaden Wings (沉重的翅膀) ====
This novel has also been called Heavy Wings in different translations; it was awarded in the 2nd Mao Dun Literature Prize of 1985. Zhang's experience working in the First Ministry of Machinery Industry provided her with the inspiration and knowledge to write about this novel on the problems faced by the companies. Zhang not only conveys people's reform ideals, but also describes the cruxes of the society. The "heavy" reformer she created belongs to the literary image of the deepening period of reform. The novel, with the theme of reform, revolves around the work and life of high-level cadres. On the one hand, it shows the contents of enterprise management and political thought of the Ministry of Heavy Industry in China, and focuses on the efforts of several reformers. On the other hand, it also shows the family life of different characters. Through the description of their life, it reflects Zhang's thinking on marriage.

==== Wordless (Wu Zi) (无字) ====
Love is one of the major themes in Wu Zi. Zhang uses interspersion technique to integrate the description of the times with the personal life experiences of a female writer called Wu Wei, describing the story of her marriage story and those of several generations of women in her family. The context of this book is based on a time of upheaval in China. It expresses women's realistic demands for love, marriage and family freedom at different stages in the new era, and shows the arduous and difficult course of women's liberation. It was Zhang's second work to win the 6th Mao Dun Literature Prize, after Leaden Wings. Zhang Jie tried to use the emotional experience of several generations in this novel to break the shackles of Chinese women, but she found that everything was in vain. Women were giving everything to fight with love, but the tragic fate could not change.

==== "Love Must Not Be Forgotten" (爱是不能忘记的) ====
This short story is about how a 30-year-old unmarried woman named Shan Shan uncovers the unfulfilled love of her mother, Zhong Yu, and a senior official in the Communist Party for each other. This story shows two types of love at the same time: love between the daughter and her mother, and the love story of the mother and the cadre. Zhong Yu wrote down her affection for this man in her notebooks. The obstacle in their love was that the man, out of gratitude and duty, married the daughter of his fellow soldier who gave his life to protect the senior official.

==== The Ark (方舟) ====
This novel advocates that men and women should first have social equality. It is one of Zhang's most personal works. The novel describes three high school classmates who leave their husbands to get together in a residential unit after a long and bumpy life, in order to get rid of the pain of reality. They call this residence an "Ark" where they can seek temporary shelter. The three women are all highly educated and intelligent women who are not respected in their marriage, and their neighbors are biased against them because of divorce or separation, yet they also have difficulties mainly on facing hostility and abuse at work. Through realism, it expresses the anxiety, loneliness and desolation of modern intellectual women's life path and spiritual pursuit.
