= Chen Yan (writer) =

Chinese dramatist and novelist (born 1963)

- 陈彦
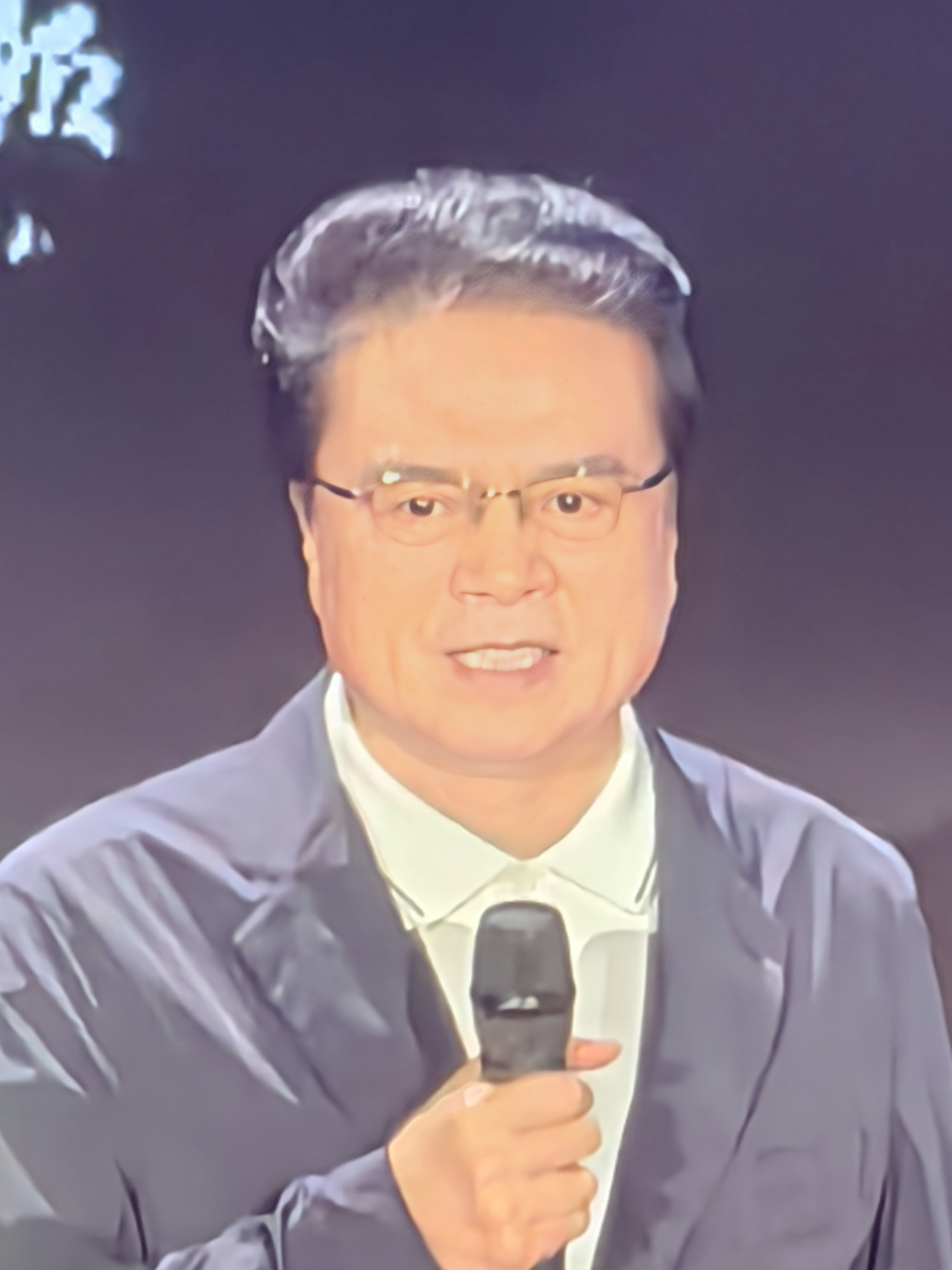
- Chen Yan in June 2026
- Born: 1963 (age 62–63); Zhen'an County, Shaanxi, China
- Occupations: Dramatist, novelist
- Writing career
- Language: Chinese
- Period: 1980–present
- Genres: Drama, novel
- Notable work: The Protagonist
- Notable awards: 10th Mao Dun Literature Prize; 2019 The Protagonist

Chinese name
- Traditional Chinese: 陳彥
- Simplified Chinese: 陈彦
Transcriptions
Standard Mandarin
- Hanyu Pinyin: Chén Yàn

Chen Yan (Chinese: 陈彦; born 1963) is a Chinese dramatist and novelist best known for his novel The Protagonist which won the 10th Mao Dun Literature Prize in 2019, one of the most prestigious literature prizes in China. He was a delegate to the 17th and 18th National Congress of the Chinese Communist Party.

== Biography ==
Chen was born in Zhen'an County, Shaanxi, in 1963. At the age of 17, he published his first short story, Blasting (爆破), in Shaanxi Workers' Literature and Art. In 2004 he became president of the Shaanxi Opera Research Institute.

== Works ==
=== Novel ===
- 主角 [The Protagonist] (in Chinese). Beijing: Writers Publishing House. 2018. ISBN 9787506398114.
- 装台 (in Chinese). Beijing: Writers Publishing House. 2015. ISBN 9787506379137.
  - English translation: The Backstage Clan. Horsham: Sinoist Books. 2023. ISBN 9781838905378.
- 西京故事 [Story of the West Capital] (in Chinese). Shaanxi: Taibai Literature and Art Publishing House. 2016. ISBN 9787551309707.

=== Drama ===
- Late-blooming Roses (迟开的玫瑰)
- Big Tree Moves Westward (大树西迁)
- Story of the West Capital (西京故事)

=== Essays ===
- 说秦腔 [Talking about Qinqiang Opera] (in Chinese). Shanghai: Shanghai Literature and Art Publishing House. 2017. ISBN 9787532162277.

== Awards ==
- 2019 The Protagonist won the 10th Mao Dun Literature Prize
