= Xu Huaizhong =

Chinese novelist

- Born: Xu Huaizhong; September 29, 1929; Handan, Hebei, China
- Died: January 13, 2023 (aged 93); Beijing, China
- Occupation: Novelist
- Children: 3
- Writing career
- Language: Chinese
- Period: 1954–2023
- Genre: Novel
- Notable work: That Which Can't Be Washed Away
- Notable awards: 10th Mao Dun Literature Prize; 2019 That Which Can't Be Washed Away; 6th Lu Xun Literary Prize; 2014 Dise

Chinese name
- Traditional Chinese: 徐懷中
- Simplified Chinese: 徐怀中
Transcriptions
Standard Mandarin
- Hanyu Pinyin: Xú Huáizhōng

Xu Huaizhong (Chinese: 徐怀中; 29 September 1929–13 January 2023) was a Chinese novelist. He is best known for his novel That Which Can't Be Washed Away which won the 10th Mao Dun Literature Prize (2019), one of the most prestigious literature prizes in China.

== Biography ==
Xu was born Xu Huaizhong (许怀中) in Handan, Hebei, on September 29, 1929. At the age of 12, he went to school in the counter-Japanese base area of Taihang Mountains. After high school in 1945, he joined the People's Liberation Army, where he was in charge of art and propaganda. He joined the Chinese Communist Party in the following year. In 1950 he was researcher at the Cultural Work Corps of Political Department of Southwest Military Region. He started to publish works in 1954, when he published his first novella The Rainbow on the Earth. He worked as an assistant in the Cultural Department of the Political Department of Kunming Army in 1955. In 1956, his first novel, We Sow Love, was published. In 1958, he served as editor of the supplement of PLA Daily. In 1973 he was promoted to deputy director of the Department of Culture of Kunming Military District. After the Cultural Revolution in 1978, he became a screenwriter at the August First Film Studio and subsequently as director of the Department of Literature of People's Liberation Army Academy of Art and director of the Department of Culture of People's Liberation Army General Political Department. He was awarded the rank of Major General (Shaojiang) in 1988.

== Works ==
- 牵风记 [Qianfengji] (in Chinese). Beijing: People's Literature Publishing House. 2019. ISBN 9787020148240.
  - English translation: That Which Can't Be Washed Away. Translated by Yuan, Haiwang; Spence, Will. Horsham: Sinoist Books. 2023. ISBN 9781838905620.
- 底色 [Bottom Color] (in Chinese). Beijing: People's Literature Publishing House. 2013. ISBN 9787020096107.
- 我们播种爱情 [We Sow Love] (in Chinese). Beijing: Popular Literature and Art Publishing House. 2003. ISBN 9787801713216.

== Awards ==
- 1983 The Anecdote on Western Route won National Award for Excellent Short Story Creation
- 2014 Bottom Color won the Sixth Lu Xun Literature Award Reportage Award
- 2019 That Which Can't Be Washed Away won the 10th Mao Dun Literature Prize
