= Jin Yucheng =

Chinese novelist

- 金宇澄
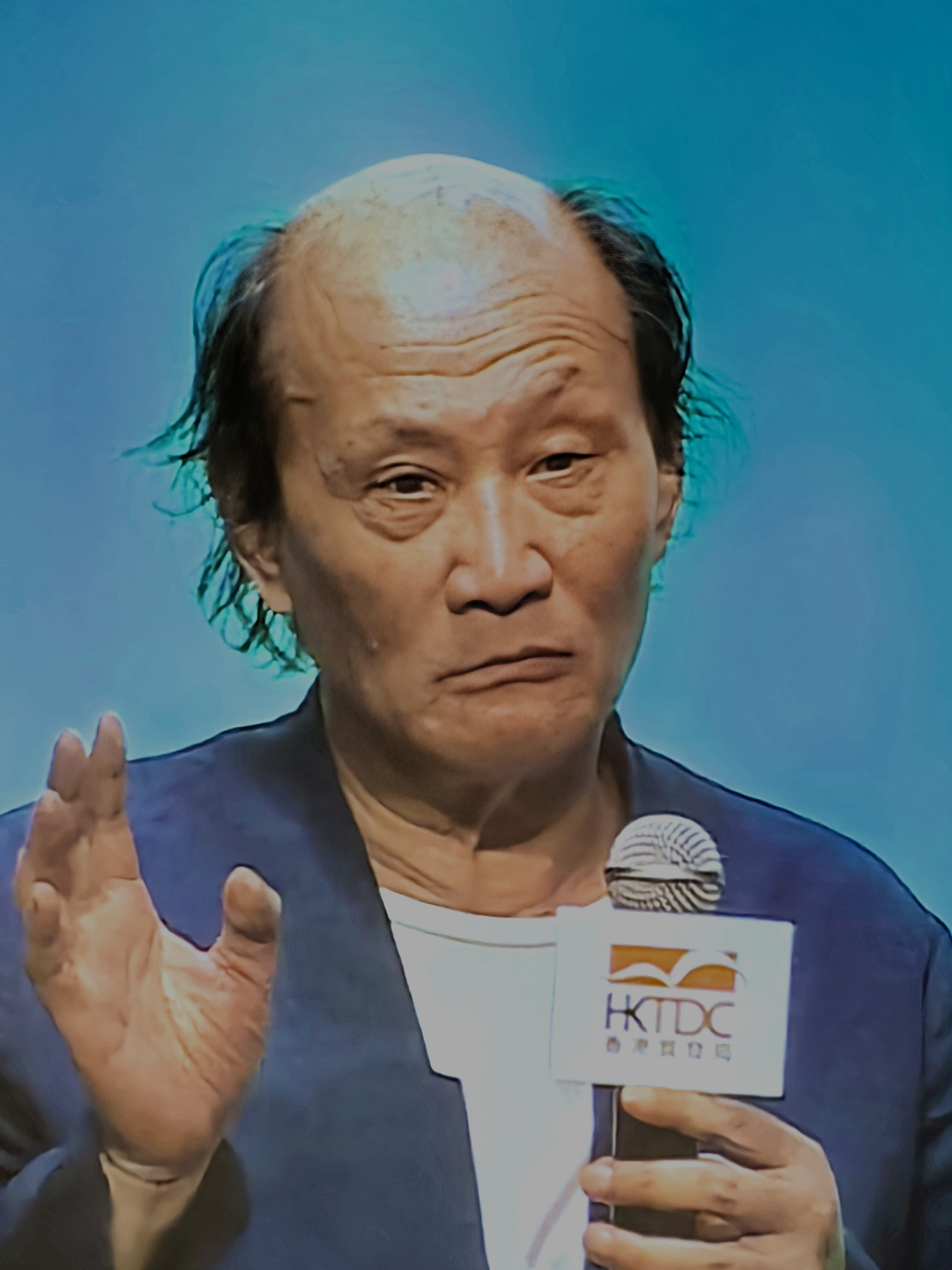
- Jin Yucheng at 2024 Hong Kong Book Fair
- Born: December 18, 1952 (age 73); Shanghai, China
- Occupation: Novelist
- Writing career
- Language: Chinese (Shanghainese)
- Period: 1985–present
- Genre: Novel
- Notable work: Blossoms
- Notable awards: 9th Mao Dun Literature Prize; 2015 Blossoms

Jin Yucheng (Chinese: 金宇澄; pinyin: Jīn Yǔchéng; born 18 December 1952) is a Chinese novelist. He is best known for Blossoms, one of the few novels written in Shanghainese, which won the Mao Dun Literary Prize (2015), one of the most prestigious literature prizes in China.

== Biography ==
Jin Yucheng was born into a wealthy family in Shanghai, on December 18, 1952. His father was a Communist revolutionary who worked under Pan Hannian and served as a government official in Shanghai. Jin is the second child of three children, with an elder brother and a younger sister. After Pan Hannian was purged in March 1954, Jin's father was stripped of his post and was also placed under investigation. Two years later, his father was released and sent to work at a cement plant in Huzhou, Zhejiang.

In July 1969, during the Cultural Revolution, Jin and his brother worked as sent-down youth at Nenjiang Farm in Heilongjiang. They stayed there for eight years, until 1977 they returned to Shanghai. After the Cultural Revolution, his father was rehabilitated. Jin was transferred to Huxi Workers' Culture Palace.

Jin started to publish works in 1985, at the age of 33. His maiden effort The Lost River was published by Mengya magazine, which won a national essay contest sponsored by Mengya magazine. He entered a Youth Writing Workshops, which was set up by the Shanghai Writers Association. In 1988, his novel, The Wind Birds, won a fiction Award sponsored by Shanghai Literature. At the same year, he was transferred to Shanghai Writers Association and worked as an editor of Shanghai Literature. In 2012, Jin Yucheng published the novel Blossoms, written in the Shanghainese dialect of Wu Chinese, has gained popularity nationwide and won several literary awards: the 2nd Shi Naian Literature Prize, the 1st Lu Xun Literature Prize, and 9th Mao Dun Literature Prize.

== Novel ==
- Blossoms (繁花)

== Awards ==
- Blossoms – 2nd Shi Naian Literature Prize, the 1st Lu Xun Literature Prize, 9th Mao Dun Literature Prize
