= Liu Baiyu =

Chinese writer (1916–2005)

- 刘白羽
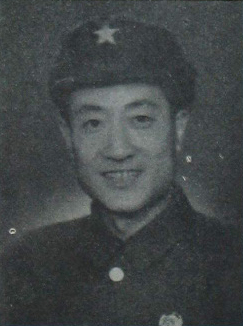
- Born: Liu Yuzan (刘玉赞); 2 September 1916; Beijing, China
- Died: 24 August 2005 (aged 88); Beijing, China
- Occupation: Novelist
- Writing career
- Language: Chinese
- Period: 1949 - 2000
- Genre: Novel
- Notable work: The Second Sun
- Notable awards: Stalin Literature and Art Prize; 1950 The Victorious Army; Mao Dun Literature Prize; 1991 The Second Sun

Liu Baiyu (Chinese: 刘白羽; pinyin: Liú Báiyǔ; 2 September 1916 – 24 August 2005), born Liu Yuzan (Chinese: 刘玉赞; pinyin: Liú Yùzàn) in Beijing, was a Chinese writer who took an orthodox Communist line on writing issues. He opposed "Western bourgeois values", influencing Chinese literature.

== Awards ==
- 1988 - Co-winner of the Mao Dun Literature Prize
