= Zhang Hongsen =

Chinese writer and politician

- 张宏森

President of China Writers Association
- Incumbent
- Assumed office March 2025
- Preceded by: Tie Ning

Personal details
- Born: August 1964 (age 62) Zibo County, Shandong, China
- Party: Chinese Communist Party
- Education: Shandong University of Technology

Chinese name
- Simplified Chinese: 张宏森
- Traditional Chinese: 張宏森
Transcriptions
Standard Mandarin
- Hanyu Pinyin: Zhāng Hóngsēn

Zhang Hongsen (Chinese: 张宏森; born August 1964) is a Chinese writer and politician, currently serving as president of the China Writers Association since March 2025.

He was a representative of the 19th National Congress of the Chinese Communist Party. He is a representative of the 20th National Congress of the Chinese Communist Party and a member of the 20th Central Committee of the Chinese Communist Party.

== Early life and education ==
Zhang was born in Zibo County (now Zibo), Shandong, in August 1964, and graduated from Zibo Normal School (now Shandong University of Technology).

== Political career ==
Zhang was a writer and editor in Shandong Zibo Federation of Literary and Art Circles in 1983, and was promoted to vice president in 1994. Zhang joined the Chinese Communist Party (CCP) in December 1988. In 1997, he became director of Film and Television Department of Shandong Film and Television Production Center, and rose to become deputy director of the center next year.

In 2003, Zhang became deputy director of the Film Administration Bureau of the State Administration of Radio, Film, and Television (now National Radio and Television Administration), rising to director in 2013. In 2013, the General Administration of Press and Publication and State Administration of Radio, Film and Television merged to form the State Administration of Press, Publication, Radio, Film and Television (now National Radio and Television Administration), where he was elevated to its deputy director in 2017.

Zhang was appointed head of the Publicity Department of the CCP Hunan Provincial Committee in 2019 and was admitted to member of the Standing Committee of the CCP Hunan Provincial Committee, the province's top authority.

In 2021, Zhang was chosen as party branch secretary and vice president of China Writers Association.

== Publications ==
- 大法官 [The Grand Justice] (in Chinese). Jinan, Shandong: Shandong Literature and Art Publishing House. 2001. ISBN 9787532918898.
- 荣辱之间 [Between Honor and Disgrace] (in Chinese). Jinan, Shandong: Shandong Literature and Art Publishing House. 2003. ISBN 9787532914302.

Preceded by Cai Zhenhong	Head of the Publicity Department of Hunan Provincial Committee of the Chinese Communist Party; 2019–2021	Succeeded by Zeng Wanming
Cultural offices
Preceded by Tie Ning	Chairman of China Writers Association; 2025–	Incumbent
