= Li Guowen =

Chinese novelist (1930–2022)

- 李国文
- Born: 24 August 1930; Shanghai, China
- Died: 24 November 2022 (aged 92); Beijing, China
- Education: Nanjing Academy of Drama; North China University of Technology
- Occupation: Novelist
- Writing career
- Language: Chinese
- Period: 1976–2022
- Genres: Novel, prose
- Notable work: Spring in Winter
- Notable awards: 1st Mao Dun Literature Prize; 1982 Spring in Winter; 2nd Lu Xun Literary Prize

Li Guowen (simplified Chinese: 李国文; traditional Chinese: 李國文; pinyin: Lí Guówén; 24 August 1930 – 24 November 2022) was a Chinese novelist who was the director of China Writers Association. Li was a member of the Chinese Communist Party.

== Biography ==
Li was born in Shanghai, Republic of China in August 1930.

In 1947, he was accepted to Nanjing Academy of Drama and graduated in 1949. After graduation, Li went to Beijing and he entered North China University of Technology.

When the Korean War broke out in 1950, Li joined the People's Liberation Army, he went to North Korea and served as a writer in the Chinese People's Liberation Army Naval Song and Dance Troupe, after the war, Li returned to Beijing, he worked in China Railway Federation of Trade Union (中国铁路总工会) as an editor.

In July 1957, Li published his short story Re-election (《改选》) in People's Literature (《人民文学》), then he was divided into right winger, and he was sent to a construction plant to work.

In 1978, Li joined the China Railway Song and Dance Troupe (中国铁路文工团). Li joined the China Writers Association in 1982 and he joined the Chinese Communist Party in 1983.

On 24 November 2022, he died of an illness in Beijing, at the age of 92.

== Works ==
=== Novel ===
- Spring in Winter (冬天里的春天)

=== Short story ===
- Re-election (改选)
- Lunar Eclipse (月食)
- History of the Dangerous Building (危楼纪事)

=== Proses and poems ===
- The Art of Swearing (骂人的艺术)
- Everyday Language (大雅村言)

=== Translated works (English) ===
- Spring in Winter: Volume 1
- Spring in Winter: Volume 2

== Awards ==
- Spring in Winter – 1st Mao Dun Literature Prize (1982)
- Lunar Eclipse – 3rd National Excellent Short Story Award
- History of the Dangerous Building – 4th National Excellent Short Story Award
- Everyday Language – 2nd Lu Xun Literature Prize
