= Liu Xinwu =

Chinese writer

- 刘心武
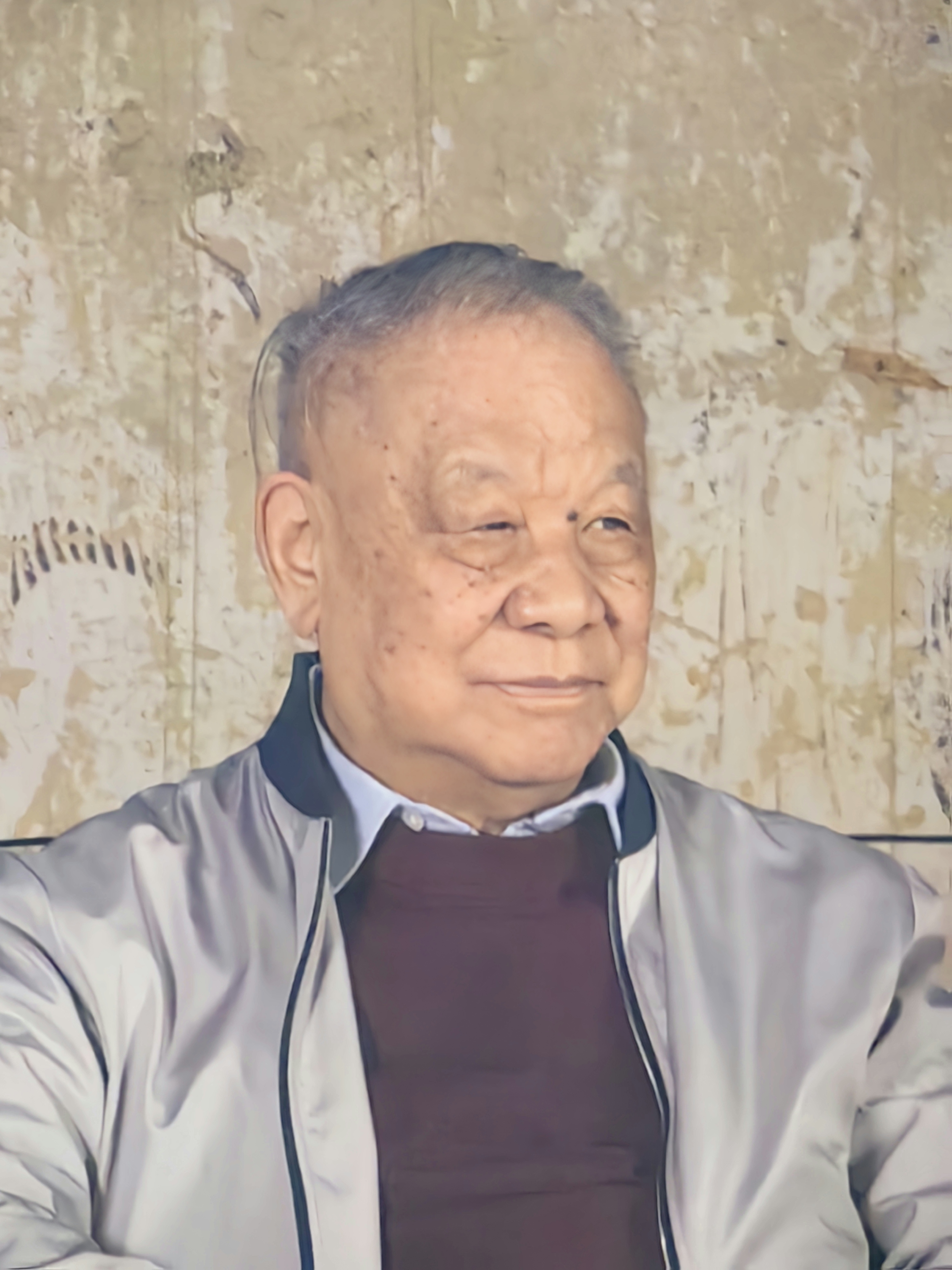
- Liu Xinwu (2026)
- Born: June 1942 (age 84); Chengdu, Sichuan, China
- Occupation: Novelist
- Writing career
- Pen name: Liu Liu (刘浏); Zhao Zhuanghan (赵壮汉)
- Language: Chinese
- Period: 1977 - present
- Genre: Novel
- Notable work: The Wedding Party
- Notable awards: 2nd Mao Dun Literary Prize; 1985 The Wedding Party
- Literary movement: Scar literature

Liu Xinwu
- Traditional Chinese: 劉心武
- Simplified Chinese: 刘心武
Transcriptions
Standard Mandarin
- Hanyu Pinyin: Liú Xīnwǔ

Liu Xinwu (Chinese: 刘心武; born June 1942) is a Chinese author, and one of the earliest proponents of the post-Maoist wave of Chinese literature.

== Biography ==
Born in the province of Sichuan, his family moved to Beijing, a city that figures prominently in his work, in 1950. Liu spent most of his life in Beijing, except for a brief period during the Cultural Revolution, when he was sent to work in rural China.

His short story, "Class counsellor" (also translated as "The Class Teacher"; Chinese: 班主任; pinyin: bān zhǔrèn) published in 1977 was one of the earliest examples of prose condemning the excesses of the Chinese government during the Cultural Revolution. His work has sometimes been referred to as scar literature, though this assessment is disputed.

Liu filled editorial positions in a number of prominent government-sponsored publications throughout most of the 1980s. In 1987, however, he was removed as editor of the publication People's Literature after a story published failed to meet government approval. He left all his government positions after the Tiananmen Square protests of 1989 because of continual harassment from the government for his pro-demonstrator stance. Since then, he has devoted himself entirely to his writing.

In 1999, Liu, along with Wang Meng and Mo Yan, was a referee for an online literature contest hosted by NetEase which contributed to the early growth of internet literature in China.

Liu's work, which includes novels, short stories, and children's literature, focuses on the common people of Beijing and people who live on the margins of society.

== Redology ==
Since the early 1990s Liu has also been engaging in Redology, also known as studies of the famous 18th-century Chinese novel Dream of the Red Chamber. Liu takes on the controversial stance that in studying this famous Qing novel, the researcher's point of departure should be the figure of Qin Keqing, thus authoring the branch of Qin studies (Chinese: 秦學; pinyin: qínxué) within redology. In 2006 Liu gave a talk at Columbia University introducing this concept. Liu has also published on The Dream with the famous redologist Zhou Ruchang.

== Translations ==
- Black Walls and Other Stories (ed. by Don J. Cohn, ISBN 962-7255-06-8)
- Chinese short stories of the twentieth century: an anthology in English (ed. by Zhihua Fang, ISBN 0-8153-0532-X) Includes "The Class Teacher".
- Prize-winning Stories from China, 1978-1979 (by Liu Xinwu, Wang Meng, and others). HC (ISBN 0-253-34620-7) PB (ISBN 0-253-20292-2) (Includes "The Teacher") Available to borrow at archive.org
- The Wedding Party (translated by Jeremy Tiang). HC (ISBN 1542031206) PB (ISBN 1542044790)
- The Wounded: new stories of the Cultural Revolution, 77-78 (ed, Hsin-hua Lu, Geremie Barmé, Bennett Lee). HC (ISBN 962-04-0007-0) PB (ISBN 962-04-0008-9) Includes "Class counsellor".
