= Scar literature =

Chinese literature portraying damage caused by the Cultural Revolution

Scar Literature
- Years active: 1978 Onwards
- Location: Mainland China
- Major figures: Liu Xinwu; Zhang Chengzhi
- Influences: Cultural Revolution; Boluan Fanzheng; New Enlightenment; Political persecution; Trauma

Scar literature
- Traditional Chinese: 傷痕文學
- Simplified Chinese: 伤痕文学
- Hanyu Pinyin: Shānghén wénxué

Scar literature or literature of the wounded (Chinese: 伤痕文学; pinyin: shānghén wénxué) is a genre of Chinese literature which emerged in the late 1970s during the Boluan Fanzheng, soon after the death of Mao Zedong, portraying the sufferings of cadres and intellectuals during the experiences of the Cultural Revolution and the rule of the Gang of Four.

== Historical background ==
During the Boluan Fanzheng period, the rise of scar literature coincided with the Beijing Spring and the decade of the New Enlightenment, a time of greater openness in Chinese society. It has been described as a "second Hundred Flowers Movement", and compared with the literary thaw in the Eastern Bloc, which was named after Ilya Ehrenburg’s The Thaw (1954).

Though scar literature focuses on trauma and oppression, and has been described as largely negative, love and faith remained its major themes; its practitioners were typically not opposed to Communism, but on the converse retained faith in the ability of the Party to rectify past tragedies, and "embraced love as a key to solving social problems". Regardless, though their writing was hailed as marking a revival of the tradition of socialist realism in the arts, it in fact represented a break from that tradition, as it was no longer subject to party control, and was not under an obligation to serve the purpose of political education for the masses.

Unlike the mass revolutionary art of the Cultural Revolution, scar literature adopted a more individualist and market-driven literary style.

== Examples ==
Most of the representative authors were in their thirties and forties at the time; they worked as salaried writers and editors, and published their works in state-sponsored literary journals. The moral outrage they expressed in their works resonated with the public, contributing to its popularity.

- The first exemplar of the genre is generally agreed to be Chen Ruoxi's 1974 short story "The Execution of Mayor Yin" (尹縣長). The story was first published in November 1974 on Mingpao Monthly (vol 107, pp.97-105).
- Another examplar is Lu Xinhua's 1978 story "Scar", which attacked official hypocrisy and corruption.
- Liu Xinwu's 1977 short story "The Class Monitor" (班主任) has also been described as the pioneer of scar literature, though this assessment is disputed.

== Responses ==
Scar literature did not entirely receive a free pass from the Party establishment; due to its criticisms of the Communist Party and of Mao himself, as well as its exposure of social problems, it came under attack by conservatives as early as 1979. Events such as the trial of Wei Jingsheng signalled writers that there were limits to the open discussion of the past errors of the Party, and after the end of the trial of the Gang of Four, the political climate chilled significantly. Eventually, the government began to crack down on scar literature as part of a wider campaign against "bourgeois liberalism". Deng Xiaoping himself provided major support for the campaign, even though his return to Chinese politics after his earlier disgrace and his political victory over rival Hua Guofeng relied heavily on the repudiation of Maoism inherent in scar literature, and its influence on public opinion. The campaign against scar literature was itself unusual in that, unlike earlier campaigns against liberalism, official criticisms were generally limited to attacks on its content, rather than denunciations of individuals.

Not all works by authors who lived through the Cultural Revolution can be classified as scar literature. Zhang Chengzhi in particular is notable for his idealism regarding his experiences during the Cultural Revolution; his works such as Black Steed and Rivers of the North have been described as rebuttals to the "negativism of scar literature". Critics of scar literature and reportage literature often contend that the trend of such literature to focus on intellectuals as heroes evades questions of complicity and therefore is a poor example for moral learning.

== See also ==
- Anti-bourgeois liberalization
- Conservatism in China#Persistence as neoconservatism
- Cultural Revolution
- Boluan Fanzheng
- Reform and Opening-up
