= Jiang Zilong =

Chinese author of fiction and essays (born 1941)

- 蒋子龙
- Born: August 1941 (age 84); Hebei province, China
- Occupation: Author

Jiang Zilong (simplified Chinese: 蒋子龙; traditional Chinese: 蔣子龍; pinyin: Jiǎng Zilóng; born August 1941) is a Chinese author of fiction and essays. He is known as the founder of 'reform literature' which deals with China's policy of reform and opening up.

== Biography ==
Jiang was born in August 1941 in Hebei province, north China. After graduating from a technical school, he was assigned to the Tianjin Casting and Forging Centre Factory (later renamed Tianjin Heavy Machinery Factory). He was enlisted in the military in 1960, demobilised in 1965 and then rejoined the factory where he rose to the rank of director.

After publishing many essays and stories during his tenure at the factory, Jiang wrote a novella titled A Day in the Life of the Chief of the Electrical Equipment Bureau, which was published in the journal People's Literature in 1976. The story was condemned as "poisonous weed" for de-emphasising class struggle and praising Deng Xiaoping who was out of favour at the time. People's Literature drafted and published a self-criticism for Jiang, and he was denounced in front of a large audience at a theatre in Tianjin. The death of Mao Zedong in September 1976 meant that Jiang escaped further criticism.

Jiang's 1979 novella Manager Qiao Assumes Office addressed the problems of state-run factories and the need for modernisation. It gained national attention and led him to become known as the founder of 'reform literature' supporting Deng Xiaoping's policy of reform and opening up, although Jiang has stated that he does not recognise that label. After becoming a full-time writer in the early 1980s, he published several more novellas dealing with the same subject matter, including sequels to Manager Qiao Assumes Office.

Jiang has also written books about other subjects including Snake God (1986), which focuses on the Cultural Revolution, and Empires of Dust (2008), which took 11 years to write and tracks the changes in rural life in China from the 1950s to the early 2000s. Empires of Dust won the 2008 Erdos Literature Award. In March 2019, the English translation of Empires of Dust was published by Alain Charles Asia.

Jiang has served as honorary chairman of the Tianjin Writers Association and vice chairman of the fifth, sixth and seventh sessions of the China Writers Association.

In 2018, the Party Central Committee and the State Council awarded Jiang the title of 'Pioneer of Reform'.

== Notable works ==
- A Day in the Life of the Chief of the Electrical Equipment Bureau (1976)
- Manager Qiao Assumes Office (1979)
- A Sequel to Manager Qiao (1980)
- The Pioneers (1981)
- Diary of a Factory Secretary (1981)
- All Colours of the Rainbow (1983)
- The Sad Song of Yan and Zhao (1985)
- Snake God (1986)
- Empires of Dust (2008)

== Works in translation (English) ==
- All the Colours of the Rainbow (1986)
- Selected Stories by Jiang Zilong (1999)
- Empires of Dust (2019)
