= China Writers Association =

Component of the China Federation of Literary and Art Circles

- 中国作家协会
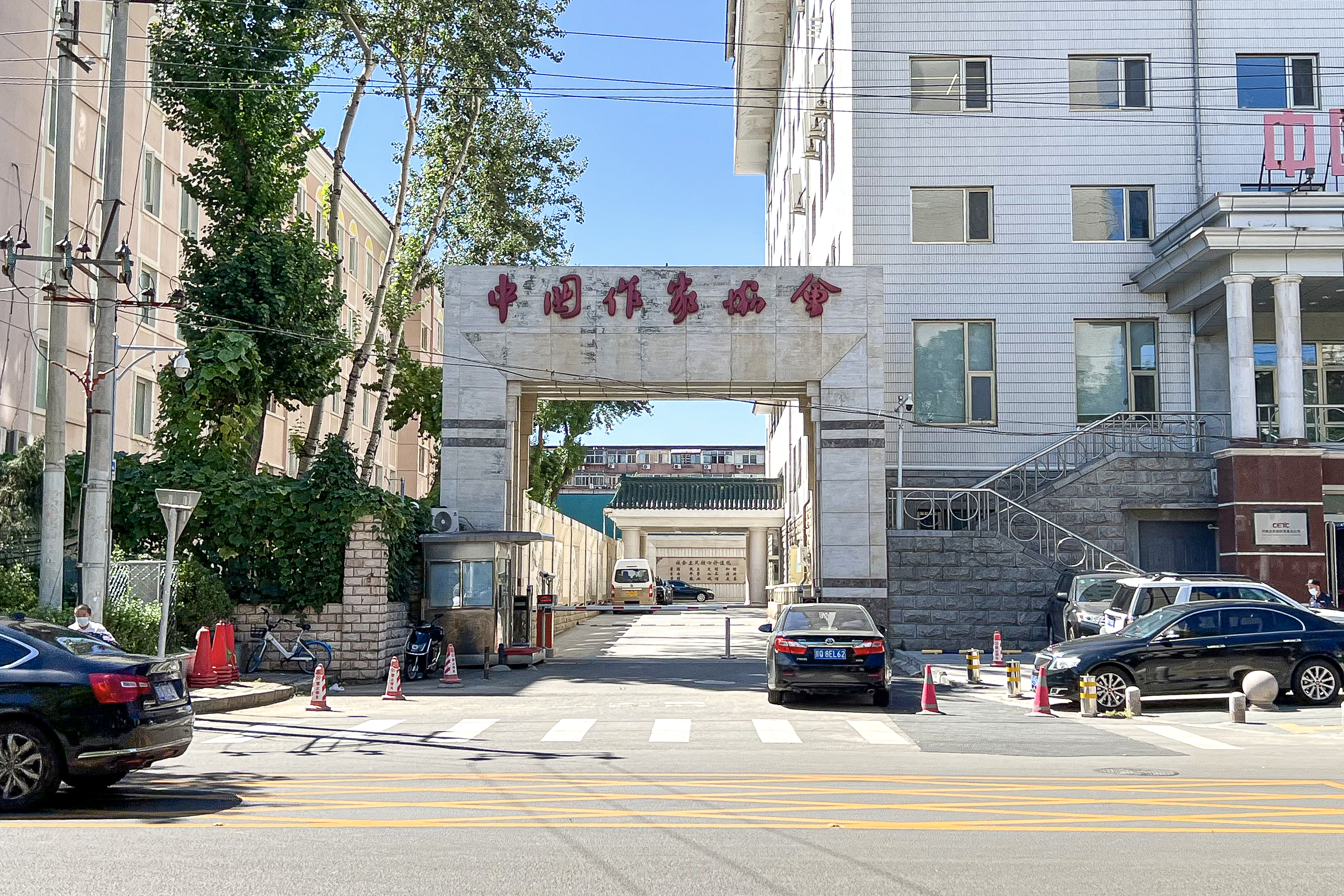
- Headquarters of the CWA
- Formation: July 23, 1949
- Type: People's organization
- Headquarters: 25 Dongtucheng Road, Chaoyang, Beijing
- President: Zhang Hongsen
- Website: www.chinawriter.com.cn

China Writers Association
- Simplified Chinese: 中国作家协会
- Traditional Chinese: 中國作家協會
Transcriptions
Standard Mandarin
- Hanyu Pinyin: Zhōngguó Zuòjiā Xiéhuì

Abbreviation
- Simplified Chinese: 中国作协
- Traditional Chinese: 中國作協
Transcriptions
Standard Mandarin
- Hanyu Pinyin: Zhōngguó Zuòxié

The China Writers Association (CWA) is a subordinate people's organization of the China Federation of Literary and Art Circles (CFLAC).

Founded in July 1949, the organization was initially named the China National Literature Workers Association. In September 1953, it was renamed the Chinese Writers Association. In April 2012, the organization changed its translated name to China Writers Association.

It had 5,196 members as of 2008 and more than 9,000 registered members, including 1,092 from minority ethnic groups, as of 2011, with branch associations across the nation. The first CWA Chair was Mao Dun, under the leadership of the then CFLAC Chairman Guo Moruo. In 1985, Mao Dun was succeeded by Ba Jin and in 2006, Ba Jin was succeeded by Tie Ning. The incumbent chair is Zhang Hongsen since 2025. Other successive Associate Chairs include Ding Ling, Feng Xuefeng, Lao She, Ke Zhongping, Shao Quanlin and Liu Baiyu.

== History ==
It was founded in July 1949 as the China National Literature Workers Association. In September 1953, it was renamed the Chinese Writers Association.

The association's leadership was purged shortly after the 1989 Tiananmen Square protests and massacre.

In April 2012, the organization changed its translated name to China Writers Association.

In 2015, the CWA established its Internet Literature Committee for members who are writers, critics, or scholars of internet literature.

In 2017, two vice presidents of the Suzhou branch of the CWA publicly resigned as a protest to what they perceived as the Chinese Communist Party's tightening of control on writers.

== Publications ==
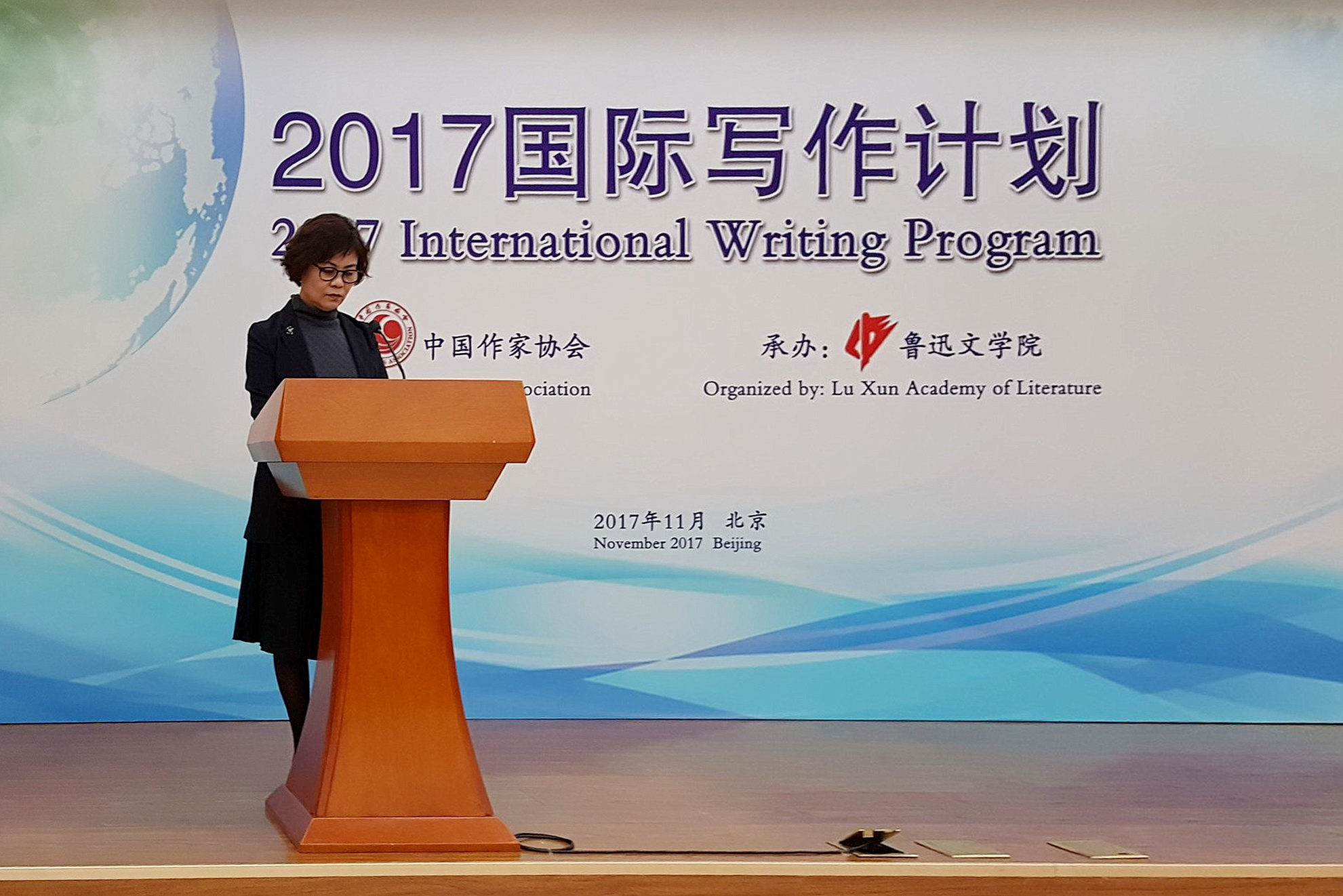
Tie Ning during opening ceremony of The 1st International Writing Program in Beijing (2017)

The Chinese Writers' Association publishes several magazines, including《人民文学》Renmin Wenxue (People's Literature) (monthly),《中国作家》Zhongguo Zuojia (Chinese Writer) (bimonthly),《诗刊》Shi Kan (Poetry) (monthly),《民族文学》Minzu Wenxue (Folk Literature) (monthly),《小说选刊》Xiaoshuo Xuankan (Selected Novels) (monthly), and Newspaper of Art (weekly). Its publishing arm is the Chinese Writers Publishing House. It also issuesWenyi Bao (《文艺报》, Literature and Art Newspaper, currently three times a week).

== Organization ==
Chairs

1. Mao Dun (1949–1981)
2. Ba Jin (1984–2005)
3. Tie Ning (2006–2025)
4. Zhang Hongsen (2025–present)

Vice-Chairs

- Feng Xuefeng (1949–1953)
- Ke Zhongping (1949–1964)
- Lao She (1949–1966)
- Shao Quanlin (1949–1971)
- Ba Jin (1949–1979)
- Zhou Yang (1949–1979)
- Ding Ling (1949–1986)
- Liu Baiyu (1953–1984)
- Li Ji (1979–1980)
- He Jingzhi (1979–1984)
- Ouyang Shan (1979–1984)
- Tieyi Fujiang Eliyev (1979–1989)
- Sha Ting (1979–1992)
- Feng Mu (1979–1995)
- Ai Qing (1979–1996)
- Chen Huangmei (1979–1996)
- Guang Weiran (1979–1996)
- Liu Binyan (1984–1989)
- Feng Zhi (1984–1993)
- Lu Wenfu (1984–2001)
- Ma Feng (1984–2001)
- Wang Meng (1984–2006)
- Liu Shaotang (1996–1997)
- Li Zhun (1996–2000)
- Deng Youmei (1996–2001)
- Xu Huaizhong (1996–2001)
- Zhai Taifeng (1996–2001)
- Zhang Qie (1996–2001)
- Tie Ning (1996–2006)
- Wei Qilin (1996–2006)
- Zhang Jiong (1996–2006)
- Jiang Zilong (1996–2011)
- Ye Xin (1996–2021)
- Huang Yazhou (2001–2006)
- Jin Binghua (2001–2011)
- Tenzin (2001–2011)
- Chen Zhongshi (2001–2016)
- Li Cunbao (2001–2016)
- Tan Tan (2001–2016)
- Zhang Ping (2001–2016)
- Chen Jiangong (2001–2021)
- Gao Hongbo (2006–2021)
- Liu Heng (2006–2021)
- Zhang Kangkang (2006–2021)
- Wang Anyi (2006–present)
- Li Bing (2011–2016)
- Liao Ben (2011–2016)
- He Jianming (2011–2021)
- Mo Yan (2011–present)
- Zhang Jian (2012–2016)
- Chen Qirong (2013–2016)
- Qian Xiaoqian (2013–2021)
- Li Jingze (2014–present)
- Jidi Majia (2015–2021)
- Jia Pingwa (2016–2021)
- Bai Gengsheng (2016–present)
- Chu Chunqiu (2016–present)
- Yan Jingming (2016–present)
- Zhang Wei (2016–present)
- Zhang Hongsen (2021–2025)
- Alai (2021–present)
- Bi Feiyu (2021–present)
- Chen Yan (2021–present)
- Chi Zijian (2021–present)
- Ge Fei (2021–present)
- Mai Jia (2021–present)
- Wu Yiqin (2021–present)

== Awards ==
- National Outstanding Children's Literature Award 全国优秀儿童文学奖
- Mao Dun Literature Award 茅盾文学奖
- Lu Xun Literature Award 鲁迅文学奖
- National Minority Literature Champion-horse Award 全国少数民族文学创作骏马奖

== Bibliography ==
- Hong, Zicheng (2007). A History of Contemporary Chinese Literature. Brill's Humanities in China Library. Vol. 1. BRILL. ISBN 9789004157545.
