= Wen (surname 文) =

Wen (文)
- Pronunciation: Wén/Wēn/Wèn (Pinyin), Man^{6} (Jyutping)
- Language: Chinese

Origin
- Language: Chinese
- Meaning: "scholarship”, “culture”

Other names
- Variant forms: Wen (Mandarin); Man, Mann (Cantonese); Boon (Hokkien); Vun (Hakka); Mun (Gan); Moon (Korean); Văn (Vietnamese); Bun (Japanese); Boenardi, Oenardi, Woen, (Indonesian)
- Cognate: Benjamin

Wen is the pinyin romanisation of the Chinese surname 文 (Wén).

文 (Wén), meaning "literary" or "culture", is usually romanised as Man in Cantonese (most widely used by those from Hong Kong), and sometimes as Mann. In Min (including the Hokkien, Teochew, and Taiwanese dialects), the name is pronounced Boon. In the Hakka, the name can be romanized as Vun or Voon. The Gan dialect transcription for the name is Mun. Other romanizations include Văn in Vietnamese, Moon or Mun (Hangul: 문) in Korean and Bun (Hiragana: ぶん) in Japanese.

== Origins ==
- from Wen (文), the posthumous title of King Wen of Zhou, father of King Wu of Zhou who established the Western Zhou dynasty
- adopted in place of another surname, Jing (敬) due to a naming taboo, as the latter was part of the name of two royal personages, Jin Gao Zu (called Shi Jingtang, 石敬瑭) and Song Yi Zu (called Zhao Jing, 趙敬). The latter was the grandfather of Zhao Kuangying (known as Emperor Taizu of Song), who established the Song dynasty.
- from Wen (文), the given name of Tian Wen, also called Lord Mengchang, a prince of Qi, known as one of ‘the four princes’ during the Warring States period
- from the personal name Wen Zi (文子), a general who lived in Wei during the Spring and Autumn period.
- from the personal name Wen Shu (文叔), the founder of the Xu (许) located in present-day Henan province) during the Western Zhou dynasty.

== Notable people named Wen ==
=== Historical figures ===
- Wen Boren (文伯仁; 1502–1575), Ming Dynasty landscape painter
- Wen Chou (文醜; died 200), Eastern Han Dynasty military general
- Wen Jia (文嘉; 1501–1583), Ming Dynasty painter of landscapes and flowers
- Wen Peng (文彭; 1497–1573), Ming Dynasty artist, maker of personal seals
- Wen Ping (文聘), Eastern Han Dynasty military general
- Wen Qin (文欽; died 258), Cao Wei military general
- Wen Shu (文俶; 1595–1634), Ming Dynasty illustrator and painter
- Wen Tianxiang (文天祥; 1236–1283), Southern Song Dynasty poet and politician
- Wen Tong (文同; 1019–1079), Song Dynasty painter
- Wen Yanbo (Song dynasty) (文彥博; 1006–1097), Song Dynasty politician and calligraphist
- Wen Yang (Three Kingdoms) (文鴦; 238–291), Cao Wei military general
- Wen Zhengming (文徵明; 1470–1559), Ming Dynasty painter, calligrapher, poet
- Wen Zhenheng (文震亨; 1585–1645), Ming Dynasty scholar, painter, landscape garden designer
- Wen Zhong (文種; died 472 BC), Zhou Dynasty advisor in the state of Yue

=== Modern figures ===
==== Wen ====
- Wen Chao (文超; born 1987), Chinese footballer
- Wen Chuanyuan (文传源; 1918–2019), Chinese aeronautical and automation engineer
- Wen Da (文达; born 1999), Chinese footballer
- Wen Fubo (文伏波; 1925–2020), Chinese water conservation engineer
- Wen Guodong (文国栋; born 1968), Chinese former politician
- Wen Huanran (文煥然; 1919–1986), Chinese historical geographer
- Wen Huyi (文虎一; 문호일; born 1983), Chinese footballer
- Wen Jia (table tennis) (文佳; born 1989), Chinese table tennis player
- Wen Jieruo (文洁若; born 1927), Chinese translator, author, editor
- Jun Wen (文军; born 1963), Chinese-American evolutionary biologist and curator
- Wen Junhui (文俊辉; stage name Jun, born 1996), Chinese singer and actor, member of boy band Seventeen
- Wen Junjie (文俊杰; born 1997), Chinese professional footballer
- Wen Meihui (文美惠; born 1931), Chinese translator
- Wen Minsheng (文敏生; 1915–1997), Chinese politician
- Wen Muye (文牧野; born 1985), Chinese film director
- Wen Qiang (文强; 1956–2010), Chinese judicial official
- Wen Qimei (文素勤; 1867–1919), mother of Mao Zedong
- Wen Shengchang (文圣常; 1921–2022), Chinese oceanographer and academic
- Wen Shuo (文烁; born 1991), Chinese footballer
- Wen Tzu-yun (文姿云; born 1993), Taiwanese karateka, Olympic bronze medalist
- Wen Wubin (文武斌; born 1997), Chinese footballer
- Xiao-Gang Wen (文小刚; born 1961), Chinese-American physicist
- Wen Xingyu (文兴宇; 1941–2007), Chinese comedian and director
- Wen Xue (文学; 문학; born 1993), Chinese footballer
- Wen Zengxian (文增显; 1952–2020), Chinese politician
- Wen Zhang (文章; born 1984), Chinese actor

==== Others ====
- Annie Man (文頌嫻; born 1976), Hong Kong actress
- Byron Mann (文峰), Hong Kong-American actor
- Daniel Man (文家永; born 1994), Hong Kong professional footballer
- Boon Hui Lu (文慧如; born 1993), Singaporean singer-songwriter and actress
- Janice Man (文咏珊; born 1988), Hong Kong actress and model
- Jazz Boon (文偉鴻; born 1966), Hong Kong television producer, director, writer
- Boon Wei Ying (文炜楹; born 1995), Malaysian badminton player

=== Fiction ===
- Wen Zhong (Shang dynasty), fiction character from the ancient novel Fengshen Yanyi

== See also ==
- Five Great Clans of the New Territories
