= Lu Yongfu =

Chinese translator

- Born: December 1922 (age 103); Xi'an, Shaanxi, Republic of China
- Education: Northwest University
- Occupation: Translator
- Writing career
- Language: Chinese, Russian
- Period: 1949–present
- Genre: Poem
- Notable work: The Complete Works of Pushkin

Chinese name
- Traditional Chinese: 盧永福
- Simplified Chinese: 卢永福
Transcriptions
Standard Mandarin
- Hanyu Pinyin: Lú Yǒngfú

Lu Yongfu (born December 1922) is a Chinese translator and Director of the Chinese Translation Association.

Lu was one of the main translators of the works of Russian novelist Aleksandr Pushkin into Chinese. For his contributions to the introduction of Russian literature to foreign readers, he was honored with a Pushkin Medal by the Government of the Russian Federation in 1999.

== Biography ==
Lu was born in Xi'an, Shaanxi in December 1922.

He graduated from Northwest University in 1946, where he majored in Russian language. After graduation, he taught in Shaanxi.

After the founding of the Communist State, Lu worked as an officer in the General Officer of the Central Military Commission, then he was transferred to the People's Literature Publishing House.

Lu joined the China Writers Association in 1979.

== Translation ==
- The Complete Works of Pushkin (普希金文集（七卷）)
- Collected Works of Mayakovsky (Vladimir Mayakovsky) (马雅可夫斯基选集)
- Rylee and Majienong (Jamalddin Ilyas Nezami) (蕾莉与马杰农)
- Earth-god (Kahlil Gibran) (大地神)
- The man, Jesus (Kahli Gibran) (人子耶稣)

== Award ==
- In 1999, he was awarded a Pushkin Medal for his translations by the Government of the Russian Federation.
- Chinese Translation Association - Competent Translator (2004)
