= Translators Association of China =

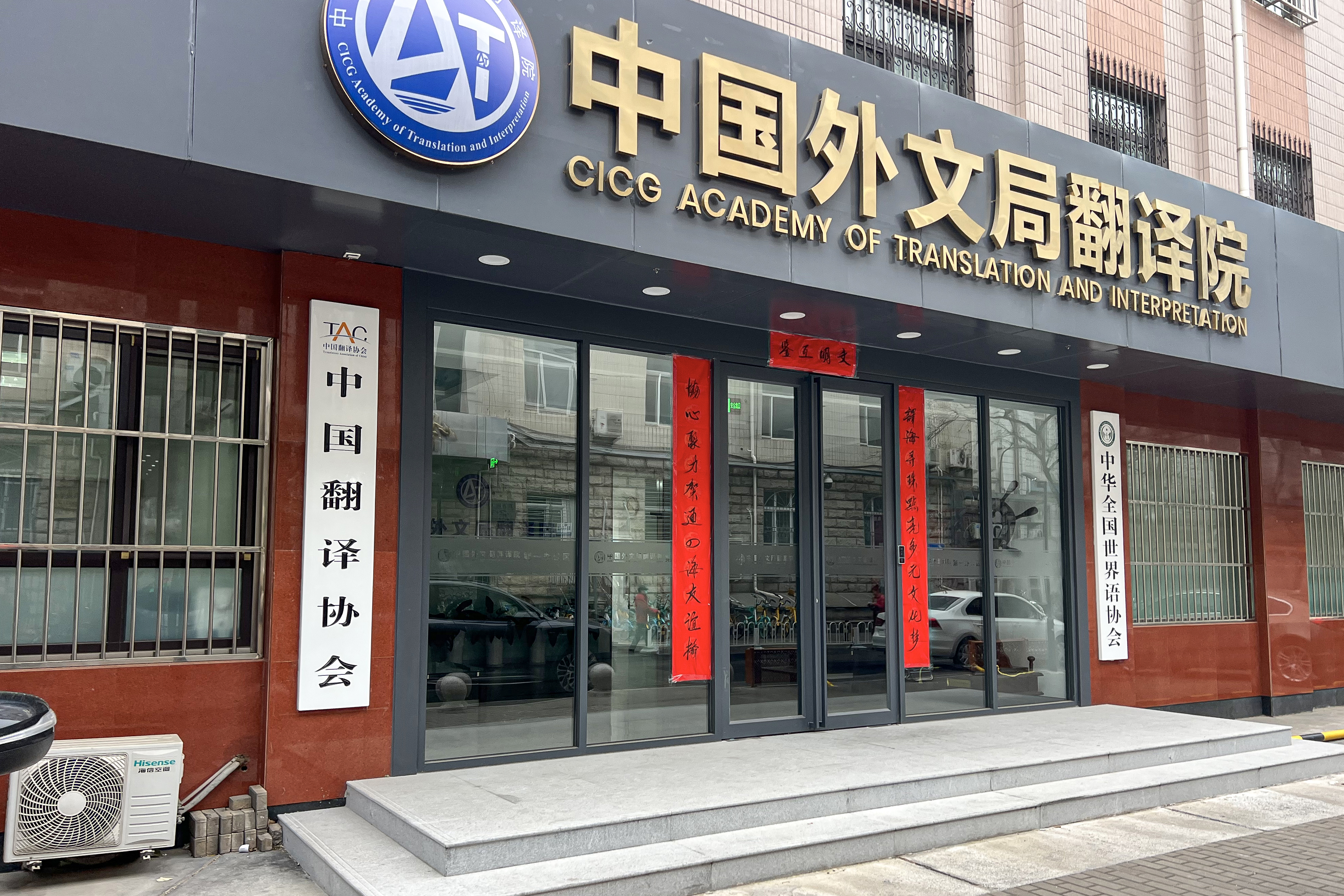
- Headquarters
- Established: 1981
- Focus: Translation studies
- President: Li Zhaoxing: Jiang Chunfang (1982–1992); Ye Shuifu (1992-1998); Song Shusheng (1998-2004); Liu Xiliang (2004-2009); Li Zhaoxing (2009-present)
- Key people: Honorary presidents: Ji Xianlin (2004–2009) Vice President (1982–1992) Honorary Consultant (1992–2004); Yan Jici (1986–1998); Ba Jin (1986–2004); Wu Xiuquan (1986–1998); Huang Hua (1992–2009); Ai Po Si Tan (2004–2009); Honorary Consultants: Zhu Guangqian (1982–1986); Qian Zhongshu (1982–1998); Lv Shuxiang (1982–1986); Bian Zhilin (1986–2004); Xie Bingxin (1986–2004); Yang Jiang (2004–2009)
- Address: 24 Baiwanzhuang Street, Xicheng District 100037
- Location: Beijing, China
- Website: tac-online.org.cn

The Translators Association of China (TAC) (simplified Chinese: 中国翻译协会; traditional Chinese: 中國翻譯協會; pinyin: Zhōngguó Fānyì Xiéhuì) is a national association for translation studies in China. Founded in the 1980s TAC was part of the academic response to the reform and opening up in 1978. The incumbent President of TAC's 6th Executive Committee is the former Chinese foreign minister Li Zhaoxing, who in the meantime chairs the Foreign Affairs Committee of China.

TAC routinely hosts annual national symposium on varied topics related to translation and interpretation theories and practices. To facilitate the academic communication, it publishes bi-monthly periodical Chinese Translators Journal since 1983. In addition, the Association regulates the domestic translation service market through its Translation Service Committee, which was set up in 2003, in order to promote ethical business practices.

TAC joined the International Federation of Translators (FIT) in 1987. As a co-founder of the FIT Asian Translators Forum, it hosted the first Forum session in 1995. Besides, it has formed strategic alliance with overseas academic societies, such as the Netherlandish translation innovation think tank TAUS. In 2011, shortly after that TAC was admitted as associate member of the CIUTI, it held the CIUTI Forum 2011 in Beijing, which was co-sponsored by CIUTI and BFSU.

== Awards ==
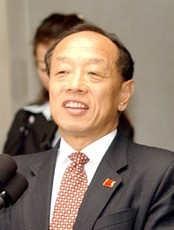
The 6th TAC President Li Zhaoxing

=== Han Suyin Award for Young Translators ===
The Han Suyin Award for Young Translators (simplified Chinese: 韩素音青年翻译奖; traditional Chinese: 韓素音青年翻譯獎), founded in 1986.

=== Chinese Translation Culture Lifetime Achievement Award ===
Lifetime Achievement Award in Translation (TAC) (simplified Chinese: 中国翻译文化终身成就奖; traditional Chinese: 中國翻譯文化終身成就獎), it is one of the most prestigious translation prizes in China, it was first awarded in 2006.

=== Competent Translator ===
The Competent Translator (simplified Chinese: 资深翻译家; traditional Chinese: 資深翻譯家), it was first awarded in 2004.

Past Winners:

- Li Wenjun, American literature translator
- Zi Zhongyun, American literature translator
- Shao Mujun, American literature translator
- Mei Shaowu, American literature translator
- Tu An, English literature translator
- Huang Ai, English literature translator
- Xu Yuanchong, English literature and French literature translator
- Yang Jingyuan, English literature translator
- Wen Meihui, English literature translator
- Wu Junxie, English literature translator
- Zheng Yonghui, French literature translator
- Gui Yufang, French literature translator
- Liu Banjiu, German literature translator
- Wen Jieruo, Japanese literature and English literature translator
- Ye Weiqu, Japanese literature translator
- Zhang Lin, Korean literature translator
- Zhang Hongnian, Persian literature translator
- Yi Lijun, Polish literature translator
- Xie Sutai, Russian literature translator
- Meng Guangjun, Russian literature translator
- Gao Mang, Russian literature translator
- Tian Dawei, Russian literature translator
- Lu Yongfu, Russian literature translator
- Zheng Xuelai, Russian literature translator
- Wei Huangnu, Russian literature translator
- Wu Mengchang, Russian literature translator
- Sun Shengwu, Russian literature translator
- Xu Leiran, Russian literature translator
- Liu Anwu, Indian literature translator
- Jin Dinghan, Hindi literature translator
- Yu Hong, Spanish literature translator
- Wang Yizhu, Greek literature, Latin literature, English literature, French literature, German literature, Japanese literature, Russian literature and Spanish literature translator
- Su Hang
- Li Yeguang
- Wu Mingqi

== Official Journal ==
- Chinese Translators Journal (simplified Chinese: 中国翻译; traditional Chinese: 中國翻譯), founded in 1980.

== China Accreditation Test for Translators and Interpreters ==
The China Accreditation Test for Translators and Interpreters (CATTI), which was launched in 2003 by the Ministry of Personnel of the People's Republic of China, is considered the most authoritative national level translation and interpretation proficiency qualification accreditation test in the People's Republic of China. It has been designed to assess the proficiency and competence of professional Chinese translators and interpreters in an objective, scientific and fair manner. The test for interpreters consists of two parts: Interpreting Comprehensive Aptitude and Interpreting Practice. The Interpreting Practice in the test for Interpreters of Level 2 consists of two specialties: Consecutive Interpreting and Simultaneous Interpreting, while the test for translators consists of two parts: Translating Comprehensive Aptitude and Translating Practice.

The test for Interpreting Comprehensive Aptitude proceeds by listening to a tape and answering questions in writing as required. Consecutive Interpreting and Simultaneous Interpreting in the Interpreting Practice in the test for Interpreters of Level 2 and the Interpreting Practice in the test for Interpreters of Level 3 proceed by on-site recording. The time for the Interpreting Comprehensive Aptitude and Consecutive Interpreting and Simultaneous Interpreting in the Interpreting Practice in the test for Interpreters of Level 2 is 60 minutes. The time for Interpreting Practice for Interpreters of Level 3 is 30 minutes. In order to renew a members CATTI certification continuing education credits given through training from the Translators Association of China, must be earned every three years.

According to Vivi's Chinese Interpreters and Translation, a worldwide team of Chinese interpreters and translators, the CATTI certification is the most difficult of the main translation and interpreting certification programs in China, in fact in the 11 years since certification began in 2003, the average pass rate for the exam has only been about 11%, with, as of 2013, only about 35,000 people having received certificates of the 295,000 that have sat the exam since its inception.

On the afternoon of November 27, the 2014 Salon of TAC Translation Services Committee was held in Beijing. Its main topic was the study on the work and industry development ideas of TAC Translation Services Committee in the next and future years. Guo Xiaoyong, the First Administrative Vice-chairman of TAC and Head of TAC Translation Services Committee, and Lin Guofu, the vice-chairman of TAC and Administrative Deputy Head of TAC Translation Services Committee hosted the salon. About 20 representatives from TAC, China Translation & Publishing Corporation, Sichuan Lan-bridge, Jinan Sunther, CSIC, Petrostar, East-juntai, Spirit Translation, Central Compilation and Translation Bureau, Beijing Shiji Tongwen and other enterprises & public institutions attended the salon.

According to the spirit of the Notice on Carrying out the Industry Exchange Activities in the Form of Salon among the translation service companies throughout the country determined in the Fourth Joint Meeting of the Third Director and Secretary-General Leadership of TAC Translation Services Committee and to promote cooperation and development in the translation service industry around the country, TAC Translation Services Committee organized two salon activities in Beijing respectively in November 2012 and December 2013, which had been welcomed and supported by the industry. Those salon participants highly appreciated the job done by TAC Translation Services Committee in 2014 during the discussion, especially the compilation work of Quotation Standards of Written Translation and Quotation Standards of Interpretation Services and the successful Ninth National Seminar on Translation Management Work. They also briefly reviewed the work by the current committee in the past years and raised recommendations and hope for the next committee. They believed that with the rapid development of social organization reform and language service, TAC Translation Services Committee should make more effort in the aspect of industry research, regulating the market, developing industry standards and improving service. This salon was full of warm atmosphere, and those representatives spoke out freely, saying that they would like to make their due share to developing our translation service industry and promoting the work of TAC Translation Services Committee.

== See also ==
- Machine translation in China
