= Xu Leiran =

Chinese translator

- 许磊然
- Born: Xu Yizeng (许怡曾); 1918; Shanghai, China
- Died: 2009 (aged 96–97); Beijing, China
- Education: University of Shanghai; Saint John's University, Shanghai
- Occupation: Translator
- Spouse: Ye Shuifu
- Writing career
- Pen name: Leiran (磊然)
- Language: Chinese, Russian
- Period: 1941–2005
- Genre: Novel
- Notable work: Anna Karenina

Xu Leiran (simplified Chinese: 许磊然; traditional Chinese: 許磊然; pinyin: Xǔ Lěirán; 1918 – 26 June 2009), better known by her pen name Leiran (Chinese: 磊然; pinyin: Leǐrán), was a Chinese female translator and a member of the China Writers Association.

Xu was most notable for being one of the main translators into Chinese of the works of the Russian novelists Ivan Turgenev and Alexander Alexandrovich Fadeyev.

== Biography ==
Xu was born Xu Yizeng (simplified Chinese: 许怡曾; traditional Chinese: 許怡曾; pinyin: Xǔ Yízēng) in Shanghai in 1918.

Xu secondary studied at Zhongxi High School for Girls (中西女子中学). Xu graduated from University of Shanghai and Saint John's University, Shanghai.

Xu started to publish works in 1941 and she worked in Times Publishing Company (时代出版社) in 1944.

Xu joined the China Writers Association in 1949.

After the founding of the Communist State, Xu was transferred from Shanghai to Beijing where she was appointed an editor in the People's Literature Publishing House.

Xu died in Beijing in 2009.

== Works ==
- Destruction (Alexander Alexandrovich Fadeyev) (毁灭)
- The Young Guards (Alexander Alexandrovich Fadeyev) (青年近卫军)
- The pedagogical poem (Anton Makarenko) (教育诗)
- Day and Night (Konstantin Simonov) (日日夜夜)
- Rudin (Ivan Turgenev) (罗亭)
- Home of the Gentry (Ivan Turgenev) (贵族之家)
- The Captain's Daughter (Aleksandr Sergeyevich Pushkin) (上尉的女儿)
- Dead Souls (Nikolai Gogol) (死魂灵)
- Anna Karenina (Leo Tolstoy) (安娜·卡列尼娜)
- The Mother (Maxim Gorky) (母亲)
- (Aleksandr Kuprin) (白毛狮子狗)

== Awards ==
- Chinese Translation Association – Competent Translator (2004)

== Personal life ==
Xu was married to her university friend Ye Shuifu (叶水夫), he also was a Chinese translator.
