= Zheng Yonghui =

Chinese writer and translator

- 郑永慧
- Born: Zheng Yongtai (郑永泰); 1918; Haiphong, French Indo-China
- Died: 2012 (aged 93–94); Beijing, China
- Education: Aurora University (Shanghai)
- Occupation: Translator
- Spouse: Deng Huiqun
- Children: 1
- Writing career
- Language: Chinese, French
- Period: 1983–2005
- Genre: Novel
- Notable work: The Complete Works of Balzac

Zheng Yonghui (simplified Chinese: 郑永慧; traditional Chinese: 鄭永慧; pinyin: Zhèng Yǒnghuì; 1918 – 9 September 2012) was a Chinese writer (of Chinese Vietnamese ethnicity) and translator who won the Lu Xun Literary Prize, a prestigious literature award in China.

Zheng rendered a great number of French literary works into Chinese for almost five decades, including 40 novels.

Zheng is most notable for being one of the main translators into Chinese of the works of the French novelists Honoré de Balzac, Alexandre Dumas and Victor Hugo.

== Biography ==
Zheng was born in Haiphong, French Indochina in 1918, with his ancestral home in Zhongshan, Guangdong.

Zheng graduated from Aurora University (Shanghai) in 1942, majoring in law at the Department of Law, and taught there when graduated.

Zheng started to publish works in 1983 and joined the China Writers Association in 1980.

In 1987, Zheng was sent abroad to study at the expense of the government.

Zheng died in Beijing in 2012.

== Works ==
- The Complete Works of Balzac (巴尔扎克作品集)
- La Peau de chagrin (Honoré de Balzac) (驴皮记)
- (Balzac) (古物陈列室)
- French: La Dame de Monsoreau (Alexandre Dumas) (蒙梭罗夫人)
- Our Love (Alexandre Dumas) (我们的爱情)
- (André Gide) (梵蒂冈的地窖)
- The Short Stories of Prosper Merimee (Prosper Merimee) (梅里美小说选)
- (George Sand) (魔鬼池塘)
- Nana (Emile Zola) (娜娜)
- Ninety-Three (Victor Hugo) (九三年)
- L'Homme qui rit (Victor Hugo) (笑面人)

== Awards ==
- Lu Xun Literary Prize (1998)
- Chinese Translation Association – Competent Translator (2004)

== Personal life ==
Zheng married Deng Huiqun (邓慧群), the couple had a son, Zheng Ruolin (郑若麟), who was a Chinese journalist in France.
