= Yao Naiqiang =

Chinese translator

- Born: September 1936 (age 89–90); Shanghai, China
- Education: Peking University
- Occupation: Translator
- Writing career
- Language: Chinese, English
- Genre: Novel
- Notable works: The Great Gatsby; The Scarlet Letter

Chinese name
- Traditional Chinese: 姚乃強
- Simplified Chinese: 姚乃强
Transcriptions
Standard Mandarin
- Hanyu Pinyin: Yáo Naǐqiáng

Yao Naiqiang (Chinese: 姚乃強; born September 1936) is a Chinese translator. He was one of the main translators of the works of the American novelists F. Scott Fitzgerald and Nathaniel Hawthorne into Chinese.

He is currently a professor and a doctoral supervisor of PLA Foreign Language College, a member of the National College Professional Foreign Language Teaching Steering Committee, and a standing director of China English Teaching Association.

== Biography ==
Yao was born in Shanghai, in September 1936. He joined the People's Liberation Army in July 1951 and enrolled in the military academy to study English. In 1957 he graduated from Peking University, where he majored in English language and literature. In 2010 the Chinese Translation Association conferred on him the title of "Senior Translator".

== Works ==
- The Great Gatsby (了不起的盖茨比)
- The Scarlet Letter (红字)
- Xinhua Dictionary with English Translation (汉英双解新华字典)
