= Wu Mengchang =

Chinese translator and author

- 伍孟昌
- Born: 1911; Xinning County, Guangdong, China
- Died: October 6, 2006 (aged 94–95); Beijing, China
- Education: Fudan University
- Occupations: Translator, author
- Writing career
- Pen name: Meng Chang (孟昌)
- Language: Chinese, Russian
- Period: 1936–2000
- Genre: Novel
- Notable work: The Complete Works of Gorky
- Notable awards: Lu Xun Literary Prize (1995)

Wu Mengchang (Chinese: 伍孟昌; pinyin: Wǔ Mèngchāng; 1911 - 6 October 2006) was a Chinese translator and author who won the Lu Xun Literary Prize in 1995, a prestigious literature award in China.

He was most notable for being one of the main translators into Chinese of the works of the Russian novelist Maxim Gorky.

== Biography ==
Wu was born in Xinning County, Guangdong in 1911. He joined the China League of Life-Wing Writers (左翼作家联盟) in 1932.

He graduated from Fudan University in 1935, where he majored in foreign language and literature.

Wu started to publish works in 1936.

In 1952, Wu joined the China Writers Association.

Wu died in Beijing on October 6, 2006.

== Works ==
- The Complete Works of Gorky (Maxim Gorky) (高尔基全集)
- The Mysteries of Paris (Eugene Sue) (巴黎的秘密)
- Americans in Japan (美国人在日本)
- Czechoslovakia (Medvedev) (捷克斯洛伐克)

== Awards ==
- Lu Xun Literary Prize (1995)
- Chinese Translation Association – Senior Translator (2004)

== Personal life ==
He had a son, Wu Yongguang (伍永光).
