= Liu Banjiu =

Chinese translator and poet

- 刘半九
- Born: Liu Renfu (刘仁甫); November 8, 1922; Huangpi District, Hubei, China
- Died: September 29, 2009 (aged 86); Beijing, China
- Education: Fudan University
- Occupations: Translator, poet
- Writing career
- Pen name: Lüyuan (绿原)
- Language: Chinese, English, German language
- Period: 1942–2009
- Genre: Poetry
- Notable works: It's A New Starting Point; Faust; The Biography of Hegel
- Notable awards: 1998; Lu Xun Literary Prize Faust The Struga International Poetry Festival – Gold Wreath Award (1998); International Poets Pen Club – Gold Award (2003)

Liu Banjiu (simplified Chinese: 刘半九; traditional Chinese: 劉半九; pinyin: Liú Bànjiǔ; 8 November 1922 – 29 September 2009), also known by his pen name Lǜyuán (Chinese: 绿原) was a Chinese translator and poet.

== Life ==
Liu was born in Huangpi District of Wuhan city, Hubei in November 1922. Liu graduated from Fudan University in 1944, where he majored in foreign languages. After graduation, he worked as an English teacher in Sichuan and Wuhan.

Liu started to publish poetry in 1941. Liu joined the Chinese Communist Party (CCP) in 1949.

After the founding of the People's Republic of China, Liu worked as an editor in the CCP Propaganda Department.

In 1955, Liu suffered political persecution in the counter-revolutionary case of Hu Feng (Chinese: 胡风反革命集团案), at the same time, he learned German language by himself.

In 1962, Liu worked in the People's Literature Publishing House as an editor. Liu retired in 1988.

Liu died in Beijing, on September 29, 2009, at the age 87.

== Works ==
=== Poetry ===
- It's A New Starting Point (Chinese: 又是一个起点)
- The Human's Poem (Chinese: 人之诗)
- Another Song (Chinese: 另一支歌)

=== Prose ===
- Lihuncao (Chinese: 离魂草)
- Feihuafeiwu (Chinese: 非花非雾集)

=== Translations ===
- Essays of Schopenhauer (Chinese: 叔本华散文集)
- The Biography of Hegel (Chinese: 黑格尔小传)
- Faust (Chinese: 浮士德)
- Max und Moritz (Chinese: in China: 顽童捣蛋记; published by Reclam in Germany: 马克斯和莫里茨)

== Awards ==
- Faust – Lu Xun Literary Prize (1998)
- The Struga International Poetry Festival – Gold Wreath Award (1998)
- International Poets Pen Club – Gold Award (2003)
- Translators Association of China – Competent Translator (2004)
