= Wu Junxie =

Chinese translator (born 1928)

- 吴钧燮
- Born: 1928 (age 97–98); Hangzhou, Zhejiang, China
- Education: Zhejiang University
- Occupation: Translator
- Writing career
- Language: Chinese, English
- Period: 1959–2000
- Genre: Novel
- Notable work: Jane Eyre

Wu Junxie (simplified Chinese: 吴钧燮; traditional Chinese: 吳鈞燮; pinyin: Wú Jūnxiè; born 1928) is a Chinese translator.

Wu is most notable for being one of the main translators into Chinese of the works of the English novelists Charlotte Brontë and Virginia Woolf.

== Biography ==
Wu was born in Hangzhou, Zhejiang in 1928.

He graduated from Zhejiang University in 1951, where he majored in English. After graduation, Wu was appointed an officer to the State Council of the People's Republic of China and the Central Propaganda Department of the Chinese Communist Party.

In 1959, Wu was transferred to the People's Literature Publishing House as an editor.

After the Cultural Revolution, Wu joined the China Writers Association in 1982.

== Works ==
- The Biography of Leo Tolstoy (列夫·托尔斯泰评传)
- Jane Eyre (Charlotte Brontë) (简·爱)
- The Old Man and the Sea (Ernest Hemingway) (老人与海)
- The Textbook of Woolf (Virginia Woolf) (伍尔夫读本)
- The Collected Works of Woolf (Virginia Woolf) (伍尔夫文集)
- Play Making (剧作法)

== Awards ==
- Chinese Translation Association – Senior Translator (2004)
