= Yang Jingyuan =

Chinese translator

- 杨静远
- Born: February 1923; Changsha, Hunan, China
- Died: June 8, 2015 (aged 92); Beijing, China
- Education: Wuhan University; University of Michigan
- Occupation: Translator
- Spouse: Yan Guozhu
- Writing career
- Pen name: Yuan Qing (苑青)
- Language: Chinese, English
- Period: 1943–2015
- Genre: Novel
- Subject: Children's literature
- Notable work: The Complete Works of the Brontë Sisters

Yang Jingyuan (simplified Chinese: 杨静远; traditional Chinese: 楊靜遠; pinyin: Yáng Jìngyuǎn; February 1923 – 8 June 2015) also known by her pen name Yuan Qing (Chinese: 苑青; pinyin: Yuàn Qīng), was a Chinese translator.

Yang is most notable for being one of the main translators into Chinese of the works of the English novelists Charlotte Brontë and Emily Brontë.

== Biography ==
Yang was born in a wealthy and highly educated family, in Changsha, Hunan, in February 1923, with her ancestral home in Suzhou, Jiangsu. Her mother Yuan Changying (袁昌英) was a translator, scholar and author who graduated from University of Edinburgh and University of Paris. Her father Yang Duanliu (杨端六) was an economist who graduated from Hunan Normal College, Hongwen Academy (宏文学院), Tokyo Zhengze English College (东京正则英语学校). His brother, Yang Hongyuan (杨弘远), was a graduate of Wuhan University.

Yang started to publish works in 1943.

After graduating from the Department of Foreign Language, Wuhan University, she attended the Department of English Language and Literature, University of Michigan, earning a Master of Arts in 1948.

When she returned to China, she taught at the Department of Foreign Language, Wuhan University, and soon she was transferred from Wuhan to Beijing where she was appointed an editor of the People's Literature Publishing House and Chinese Academy of Social Sciences.

Yang died in Beijing, on June 8, 2015, aged 92.

== Works ==
- The Complete Works of the Brontë Sisters (勃朗特姐妹全集)
- Letters of Charlotte Brontë (Charlotte Brontë) (夏绿蒂·勃朗特书信)
- The Stories of the Brontë Sisters (勃朗特一家的故事)
- The Biography of Mark (马克思传)
- The Biography of Engels (恩格斯传)
- The Biography of Mark and Engels (马克思恩格斯合传)
- (Joseph Conrad) (哈丽特·塔布曼)
- Peter Pan (James Mathew Barrie) (彼得·潘)
- (Grahame) (柳林风声)

== Awards ==
- Chinese Translation Association – Competent Translator (2004)
