= Sun Shengwu =

Chinese translator and editor

- 孙绳武
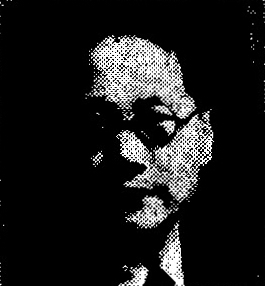
- Born: 1917; Yanshi, Henan, China
- Died: June 9, 2014 (aged 96–97); Beijing, China
- Resting place: Babaoshan Revolutionary Cemetery
- Education: Northwest University; Counter-Japanese Military and Political University
- Occupations: Editor, translator
- Writing career
- Pen name: Sun Wei
- Language: Chinese, Russian

Chinese name
- Traditional Chinese: 孫繩武
- Simplified Chinese: 孙绳武
Transcriptions
Standard Mandarin
- Hanyu Pinyin: Sūn Shéngwǔ

Sun Shengwu (Chinese: 孙绳武; 1917 – 9 June 2014), also known as Sun Wei (孙玮), was a Chinese translator and editor.

== Biography ==
Sun was born in Yanshi, Henan, China in 1917. In 1942 he graduated from Northwest University, where he majored in the Russian language. In 1949 he joined the Time Publishing House as an editor. He was transferred to the People's Literature Publishing House in 1953, where he successively worked as Director of Foreign Editorial Office and Deputy Editor-In-Chief. He joined the Chinese Communist Party in 1960. He founded the Foreign Literature. He retired in April 1987. He died in Beijing on June 6, 2014. He was buried in Babaoshan Revolutionary Cemetery.

== Works ==
- 孙绳武诗文集 [Sun Shengwu's Collection of Poems and Essays] (in Chinese). Beijing: People's Literature Publishing House. 2016. ISBN 9787020094103.
- 高尔基传 [Biography of Gorky] (in Chinese).
- 莱蒙托夫传 [Biography of Lemontov] (in Chinese).
- 普希金传 [Biography of Pushkin] (in Chinese).
- 列夫·托尔斯泰传 [Biography of Leo Tolstoy] (in Chinese).
- Sun Shengwu; Jiang Luhe. 俄国文学史 [History of Russian Literature] (in Chinese).
