= Land of Memories =

AI-generated novel by Shen Yang

Land of Memories (Chinese: 机忆之地) is a Chinese science-fiction novel by Shen Yang (沈阳), a professor at Tsinghua University's School of Journalism and Communication. The story revolves around a former neuroscientist trying to recover her memories from the metaverse after suffering amnesia due to an accident. It contains almost 6,000 Chinese characters and was shortened from an AI-generated draft that was 43,000 characters long. The process involved 66 prompts spanning almost three hours.

The novel was among 18 submissions that won the level-two prize at the Fifth Jiangsu Youth Science Education and Science Fiction Competition (第五届江苏省青年科普科幻作品大赛). The contest was restricted to participants between the age of 14 and 45 but did not forbid entries generated by AI. One of its organizers reached out to Shen after finding out that the professor had been experimenting with writing science fiction using AI. The judges were not told about the novel's origin in advance. Three of them, out of the six, approved the work. One judge, who had worked with AI models before, recognized that the novel was written by AI and criticized the work for lacking emotional appeal. The organizer who had contacted Shen said the novel's introduction was not bad but the story did not develop well. It would not meet the usual standards for publication. However, he still plans to allow AI-generated submissions in 2024.

Fu Ruchu, editorial department director of the People's Literature Publishing House, said the novel was not easily identifiable as AI-generated and applauded its logical consistency. She warned that artificial intelligence could endanger the jobs of fiction writers and cause permanent damage to literary language.
