= Xie Sutai =

Chinese translator

- 谢素台
- Born: November , 1925; Hebei, China
- Died: July 18, 2010 (aged 84); Beijing, China
- Education: Tsinghua University
- Occupation: Translator
- Writing career
- Language: Chinese, Russian, English
- Period: 1950–2010
- Genre: Novel
- Notable work: Anna Karenina

Xie Sutai (simplified Chinese: 谢素台; traditional Chinese: 謝素臺; pinyin: Xiè Sùtái; November 1925 – 18 July 2010) was a Chinese translator.

She was most notable for being one of the main translators of the works of the Russian novelist Leo Tolstoy into Chinese.

== Biography ==
Xie was born in Hebei in November 1925.

Xie was accepted to Southwest United University in 1945, where she majored in the Department of Foreign languages.

After the Chinese Civil War, Xie was transferred to Tsinghua University. After graduating in 1949, she was appointed an editor at the People's Literature Publishing House.

Xie started to publish works in 1950 and she joined the China Writers Association in 1984.

Xie died of pneumonia on July 18, 2010, at Chaoyang Hospital (朝阳医院) in Beijing.

== Translations ==
- Anna Karenina (安娜·卡列尼娜)
- Collected Works of Leo Tolstoy (Leo Tolstoy) (列夫·托尔斯泰文集)
- Far Away from Moscow (远离莫斯科的地方)
- The Living and the Dead (生者与死者)
- Towarding a New Shore (走向新岸)
- Butterfly Dream (蝴蝶梦)
- The Moonstone (月亮宝石)
- Childhood, Juvenile, and Youth (童年·少年·青年)
- Free Air (自由空气)
- The Wilderness Hotel (荒野旅店)
- At 79 Park Avenue (派克大街79号)
- Cosette (珂赛特)
- Villette (Charlotte Brontë) (维莱特)

== Awards ==
- Chinese Translation Association – Competent Translator (2004)
