= Returned Poet =

Group of Chinese poets

The Returned Poets (Simplified Chinese: 归来的诗人 or 复出的诗人; Traditional Chinese: 歸來的詩人 or 復出的詩人; pinyin: guīlái dè shīrén or fùchū dè shīrén) are a group of Chinese poets who were marginalized or expelled from literary circle in the 1950s and the early 1960s due to political reasons and returned after the Cultural Revolution. In other definitions, poets who stopped writing and publishing during the Cultural Revolution and returned after that can also be generally considered as "returned." However, the term only refers to those who were expelled before the Cultural Revolution, according to the mainstream opinions from Chinese literary scholars. The Returned Poets and their works signified a strong desire, not only to repair the damage caused by the politicization of poetry, but also revive and reconstruct the contemporary Chinese poetic paradigm.

The Gang of Four was overthrown in 1976 and The Cultural Revolution ended after the shift of power in the Chinese Communist Party (CCP). Deng Xiaoping came into power in 1978 and a series of political rehabilitation (平反冤假错案) also started at the same year. As a result, poets, alone with other types of rightist and the Educated Youth (知识青年), returned and regain their right to write and publish their poems.

The Returned Poets were so named because most of their poems published after the Cultural Revolution were coincidentally relevant to the concept of return returned, either literally or metaphorically. For instance, the first album published by Ai Qing (艾青) after his return, was literally named as The Song of Return (归来的歌). Liu Shahe (流沙河) wrote a poem called Return (归来). Liang Nan (梁南) had one of his poem titled The Time of Return (归来的时刻).

== List of Returned Poets ==
The Returned Poets can be divided into three subgroups. The first subgroup is the Poetry School of July (七月诗派), who were arrested because of the Counter-Revolution Case of Hu Feng (胡风反革命集团案) in 1955. Poets in this subgroup are: Hu Feng (胡风), Liu Banjiu (刘半九), Niu Han (牛汉), Zeng Zhuo (曾卓), Ji Fang (冀汸), Peng Yanjiao (彭燕郊), Lu Li (鲁藜), Luo Luo (罗洛), etc.

The second subgroup includes those who were categorized as rightist during the Anti-Rightist Campaign (反右运动) in 1957. They are: Ai Qing (艾青), Gong Liu (公刘), Liu Shahe (流沙河), Liang Nan (梁南), Lin Xi (林希), Zhao Kai (赵恺), Chang Yao (昌耀), Bai Hua (白桦), Shao Yanxiang (邵燕祥), Zhou Liangpei (周良沛), Hu Zhao (胡昭), etc.

The last subgroup includes those who were influenced by the western modernism and kept a distance from the proletarian literature. They are: Mu Dan (穆旦), Du Yunxie (杜运夔), Yuan kejia (袁可嘉), Zheng Min (郑敏), Xin Di (辛迪), Chen Jingrong (陈敬容), Tang Qi (唐祈), Tang Shi (唐湜), Hang Yuehe (杭约赫), etc.

In addition, Cai Qijiao (蔡其矫), who were politically criticized during the 1950s and the 1960s, is also considered as a returned poet.

== Art Characteristics and Works ==
The first poetic characteristic of the Returned Poets is that their poems were autobiographical, especially at the beginning of this new era, roughly from 1978 to the early 1980s. With the expectation of a new era, they considered their return as both in real social life and cultural world. The narrator, created by Liu Shahe (流沙河) in his Return (归来), represented a very common poetic subject in this period. The long and suffering journey of this return referred to more than 20-year unjustified treatment. This mixing of joy, sentimentality, and proud became the emotional core of their poems.

我回来了，我回来了，
我活着从远方回来了，
远的就像冥王星的距离，
仿佛来自太阳系的边缘。

Translation:

I returned, I returned,
I returned alive from far away,
As far as the distance of Pluto,
On the edge of the solar system.

— Translated by the editor of this Wikipedia entry

The second characteristic is that their poems were both individual and historical reflection. Returned Poets identified themselves as the witness of history, thus they thought they should be socially and culturally responsible. On one hand, they reflected their individual experience and the historical trauma; on the other hand, they were also critical on a broader level and try to find the historical and social reason for a national tragedy. Returned Poets were always in a tension with the Chinese history, like what Gong Liu (公刘) showed in his poem Reflection (沉思):

既然历史在这里沉思，
我怎么能不沉思这段历史？

Translation:

Since history was here reflecting,
How could I not reflect the history?

— Translated by the editor of this Wikipedia entry

The theme of "reflection on history" became a motley face among the Returned Poets. It can be: joyful or sad, love or hate, sticking to the belief or feeling lost to the future, the illusion of poetic hero or the sentimentality of suffering and losing. It is from this demand of new emotional expression that the Returned Poets went into different directions and developed their poetic skills in the new era.

=== Ai Qing ===
Ai Qing's reputation was already built in the late 1930s. His emotional articulation on the suffering of Chinese nation was very influential at that time. He wrote more than two hundred poems and published several albums after his return in 1978. Some of them focused on real political issue; some had a grandiose theme concerning the historical experience of Chinese or even human beings; and some were just casual writing. Fish Fossil (鱼化石) was regarded as an autobiography for that period.

不幸遇到火山爆发，
也可能是地震，
你失去了自由，
被埋进了灰尘；

过了多少亿年，
地质勘探队员，
在岩层里发现你，
依然栩栩如生。

但你是沉默的，
连叹息也没有，
鳞和鳍都完整，
却不能动弹；
...
活着就要斗争，
在斗争中前进，
即使死亡，
能量也要发挥干净。

Translation:

Unfortunately, a volcano's eruption
Or perhaps an earthquake
Cost you your freedom
And buried you in the slit.

After millions of years
Members of a geological team
Found you in a layer of rock
And you still look alive.

But you are now silent,
Without even a sigh.
Your scales and fins are whole
But you cannot move.
...
To live is to struggle
And advance in the struggle;
Even if death is not at our doorstep,
We should use our energy to the fullest.

His poems in the new era showed a continuation of his poetic characteristics: the sympathy for suffering people and the faith in people's revitalization. Ai Qing's poetic characteristics shows the aestheticization of political and ideological struggle, which was generally viewed as the struggle between light and dark during the 1980s. These poems wrote after his returned were limited by his old thoughts and skills, thus didn't provide much new nutrition to contemporary Chinese poetry in the new era.

=== Chang Yao (昌耀) ===
Chang Yao was born 1936 and started writing at the early 1950s. He was divided as a rightist and was forced to Laogai (reform through labor) for more than 20 years before his return. Like all other returned poets, he also faced the conflict between the old poetic style and the new aesthetic demand. He didn't just focus on a right-or-wrong judgement on history, but turned to a more transcendental subject: the salvation of life through love. It was very obvious in his poem Ferry of Mercy (慈航).

是的，在善恶的角力中
爱的繁衍与生殖
比死亡的戕残更古老、
更勇武百倍。

Translation:

Indeed, in the wrestle between the good and the evil
The reproduction of love
Compared with the cruelty of death, is hundredfold persistent,
And brave.

— Translated by the editor of this Wikipedia entry

Another noticeable phenomenon in Chang Yao's poem is his pursuit of social justice. In some of his poems, he consciously expressed his critical attitude toward the commodification and inequality in the era of economic reform, and it accidentally echoed with the New Left (新左派) thought in China (although Chang Yao himself didn't know this school of thought at that time), which appeared in the late 1990s and criticize the global capitalism. "Ironically, Chang Yao was unjustifiably labeled as a rightist when the left is the dominant ideology; yet he called him a leftist after he returned, in a time when nobody talked about the left any longer."

== Criticism ==
The Returned Poets, along with the younger generation of poets who started writing later than them, such as the so-called Misty Poets, played the major roles for Chinese poetry in the 1980s. They tried to adapt themselves to the new era and the new poetic aesthetics and explored new poetic skills. In general, their contribution to the development of Chinese poetry was "positive, although limited.
