= Huang Ai =

Chinese translator

- 黄爱
- Born: 1919; Zhongxiang, Hubei, China
- Died: September 28, 2008 (aged 88–89); China
- Education: Tsinghua University
- Occupation: Translator
- Children: 1
- Writing career
- Pen name: Huang Yushi (黄雨石)
- Language: Chinese, English
- Period: 1950–2008
- Genre: Novel
- Notable work: Oliver Twist

Huang Ai (simplified Chinese: 黄爱; traditional Chinese: 黃愛; pinyin: Huáng Aì; born 1919 – September 28, 2008) better known by his pen name Huang Yushi (黄雨石; 黃雨石; Huáng Yǔshí), was a Chinese translator. He is among the first few in China who translated the works of Charles Dickens's into Chinese language.

== Biography ==
Huang was born in Zhongxiang, Hubei in 1919.

He graduated from Tsinghua University in 1950, where he majored in English language. After graduation, Huang worked in the People's Literature Publishing House, he translated Selected Works of Mao Zedong from Chinese to English in 1950s.

== Translations ==
- Selected Works of Mao Zedong (毛泽东选集)
- Oliver Twist (Charles Dickens) (雾都孤儿)
- The Shipwreck (Rabindranath Tagore) (沉船)
- The Way of All Flesh (Samuel Butler) (众生之路)
- Rainbow (D. H. Lawrence) (虹)
- (Joseph Conrad) Joseph Conrad (黑暗的心·吉姆爷)
- A Portrait of the Artist as a Young Man (James Joyce) (一个青年艺术家的画像)

== Awards ==
- Chinese Translation Association - Senior Translator (2004)

== Personal life ==
Huang has a son, Huang Yisi (黄宜思), who also a translator.
