= Wang Yizhu =

Chinese translator and scholar (1925–2019)

- 王以铸
- Born: 1925; Tianjin, China
- Died: 18 June 2019 (aged 93)
- Education: Peking University
- Occupations: Translator, scholar
- Spouse: Cui Miaoyin
- Writing career
- Language: Chinese, classical Greek, Latin, English, French, German, Japanese, Russian, Spanish, Hebrew
- Period: 1949–2019
- Genre: Poem
- Notable work: Annals

Wang Yizhu (simplified Chinese: 王以铸; traditional Chinese: 王以鑄; pinyin: Wāng Yǐzhù; 1925 – 18 June 2019) was a Chinese translator and scholar. Wang masters Chinese, classical Greek, Latin, English, French, German, Japanese, Russian, Spanish and Hebrew. In the Chinese academic society, he was accounted as the only scholar who has the ability to talk with Qian Zhongshu in different languages.

== Biography ==
Wang was born in a wealthy family in Tianjin in 1925. During his childhood, Wang lived in Tianjin concession, he learned English and French by himself.

Wang was a graduate student in English language at the Peking University, he stayed at home learned Japanese, German and Italian by himself about seven years.

During the Chinese Civil War, Wang taught at Tianjin Nankai School.

After the founding of the Communist State, Wang worked in the People's Literature Publishing House.

In 1966, the Cultural Revolution was launched by Mao Zedong, Wang was sent to the May Seventh Cadre Schools to work in Xianning.

== Translations ==
- Histories (历史)
- Annals (编年史)
- The History of War (战争史)
- History of the Ancient Oriental (古代东方史)
- History of the Ancient Roman (古代罗马史)
- (撒路斯提乌斯喀提林阴谋：朱古达战争)
- (凯撒评传)
- (奥古斯都)
- Collected Works of Goethe and Schiller (Johann Wolfgang von Goethe and Johann Christoph Friedrich von Schiller) (歌德席勒叙事谣曲选)
- Tsurezuregusa (Yoshida Kenko) (徒然草)
- Poetry of Wilde (Oscar Wilde) (王尔德诗歌)

== Awards ==
- Chinese Translation Association – Competent Translator (2004)

== Personal life ==
Wang married translator Cui Miaoying (崔妙音), she was a graduate student in English language at the Fu Jen Catholic University, she masters English, French and German.
