= Li Wenjun =

Chinese translator (1930–2023)

- 李文俊
- Born: 8 December 1930; Zhongshan, Guangdong, China
- Died: 27 January 2023 (aged 92)
- Education: Fudan University
- Occupations: Translator; writer
- Spouse: Zhang Peifen
- Writing career
- Language: Chinese, English
- Period: 1952–2023
- Genres: Novel, prose
- Notable works: The Sound and the Fury; As I Lay Dying; Go Down, Moses

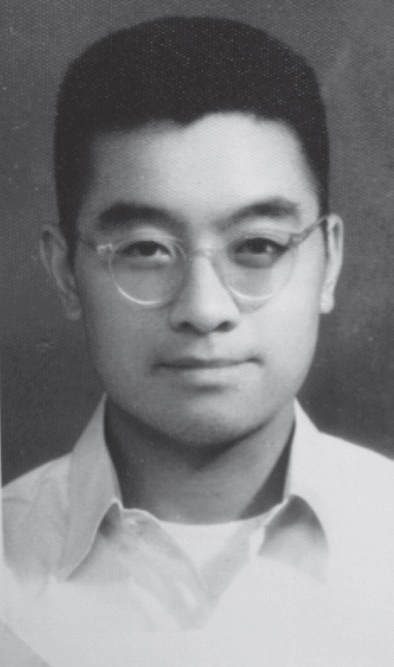
Li Wenjun

Li Wenjun (Chinese: 李文俊; pinyin: Lǐ Wénjùn; 8 December 1930 – 27 January 2023) was a Chinese translator and writer of prose. Li served as the vice chairman of Translators Association of China and as the director of the Literature and Art Translation Committee. He was also a researcher at the Chinese Academy of Social Sciences.

Li was one of the main translators of the works of the American novelists William Faulkner and Frances Hodgson Burnett into Chinese. For his contributions to the introduction of American literature to foreign readers, he was honored with the Sino-US Literature Exchange Award in 1994.

== Biography ==
Li was born in Zhongshan, Guangdong on 8 December 1930. He graduated from Fudan University in 1952, where he majored in journalism at the Department of Journalism. After graduation, Li began to publish his works, and worked in World Literature (《世界文学》) as an editor. In 1979, Li joined the China Writers Association.

== Death ==
Li died on 27 January 2023, at age 92.

== Translations ==
- The Sound and the Fury (喧哗与骚动)
- As I Lay Dying (我弥留之际)
- Go Down, Moses (去吧，摩西)
- Absalom, Absalom! (押沙龙，押沙龙！)
- Little Lord Fauntleroy (Frances Hodgson Burnett) (小爵爷)
- A Little Princess (Frances Hodgson Burnett) (小公主)
- The Secret Garden (Frances Hodgson Burnett) (秘密花园)
- The Metamorphosis (Franz Kafka) (变形记)
- The Ballad of the Sad Café (Carson Mccullers) (伤心咖啡馆之歌)

== Works ==
- William Faulkner (威廉·福克纳)
- A Brief History of American Literature (美国文学简史)
- Woman and The Gallery (妇女画廊)
- Zonglangdahuaji (纵浪大化集)
- Seeking, finding (寻找与寻见)

== Personal life ==
Li married Zhang Peifen (张佩芬), also a translator.

== Award ==
- Sino-US Literature Exchange Award (1994)
- TAC's Lifetime Achievement Award in Translation (2014)
