= Wen Jieruo =

Chinese translator, author and editor (born 1927)

- 文洁若
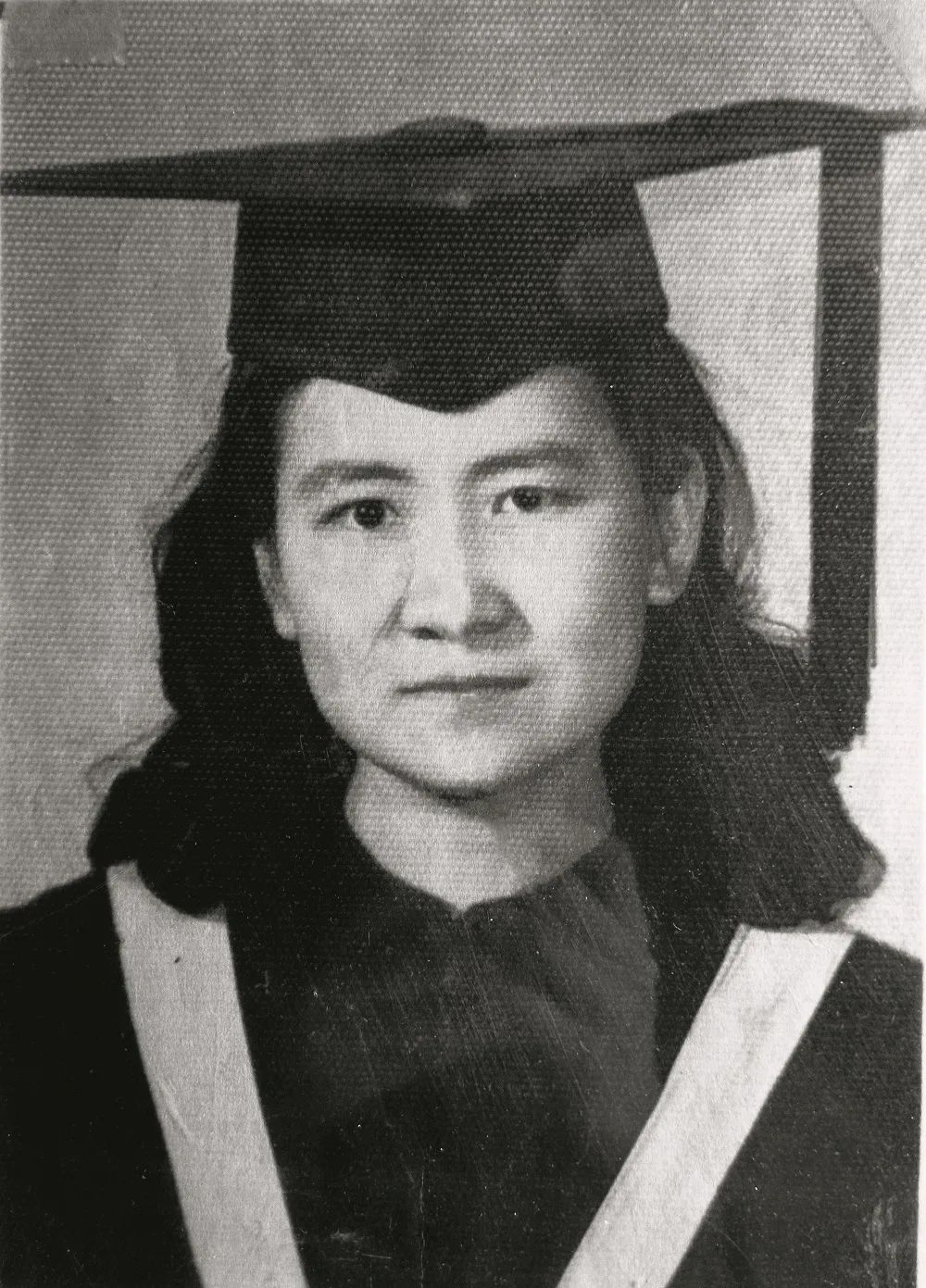
- Wen Jieruo in 1950
- Born: Wen Tongxin (文桐新); July 1927 (age 99); Beijing, China
- Education: Tsinghua University
- Occupations: Editor, translator, author
- Spouse: Xiao Qian (m. 1954; died 1999)
- Relatives: Wen Zongshu (father); Wan Peilan (mother)
- Writing career
- Language: Chinese, English, Japanese
- Period: 1950–present
- Genre: Novel
- Notable works: The Pillow Book; Ulysses
- Notable awards: Order of the Sacred Treasure (2002)

Wen Jieruo (simplified Chinese: 文洁若; traditional Chinese: 文潔若; pinyin: Wén Jiéruò; born July 1927) is a Chinese translator, author and editor. She translated literature from English and Japanese to Chinese. Wen is a member of China Writers Association and Chinese Translation Association. She is fluent in both English and Japanese.

For her contributions to the introduction of Japanese literature to foreign readers, she was honored with the Japanese Foreign Minister Recognition Award in 2000 and the Order of the Sacred Treasure in 2002.

== Biography ==
Wen was born Wen Tongxin (文桐新) in July 1927 in Beijing, with her ancestral home in Guiyang, Guizhou, the daughter of Wan Peilan (万佩兰) and Wen Zongshu (文宗淑), a Chinese diplomat, he held the post of consul general for the Republic of China at Yokohama. She has six brothers and sisters. Her grandfather Wen Mingqin (文明钦) was a magistrate in Guangxi during the late Qing dynasty (1644–1911).

At the age of 7, she attended Kongde School (孔德学校), the predecessor of Beijing No.27 High school. One year later, Wen moved to Tokyo, living with her father. In February 1936, her father was removed from office, Wen returned to Beijing, studying at Furen School (辅仁中学). After the Second Sino-Japanese War, Wen was accepted to Tsinghua University, where she majored in English.

During her university career, Wen started her translation practice, she translated Guo Moruo's Goddess (女神) into English. After graduation, Wen worked in SDX Joint Publishing Company (三联书店) and People's Literature Publishing House in different positions, including editor, senior editor and translator of Japanese literature.

During the Cultural Revolution, her husband Xiao Qian was labeled as a "rightist" by the Communist government, they were sent to the May Seventh Cadre Schools to work. After the Cultural Revolution, in 1979, she joined the China Writers Association.

From 1985 to 1986, Wen visited Japan.

Wen retired in July 1990. From 1990 to 1994, Wen and her husband Xiao Qian spent four years translating James Joyce's notable novel Ulysses into Chinese.

== Personal life ==
Wen married a Chinese translator and author Xiao Qian, the couple has two sons and a daughter. Their daughter Xiao Lizi (萧荔子) was born on 30 January 1955. Their son, Xiao Tong (萧桐), was born on November 10, 1956. All of her children are living in the United States.

== Translations ==
- Kojiki (古事记)
- The Pillow Book (枕草子)
- The Tale of the Heike (平家物语)
- The Decay of the Angel (Yukio Mishima) (天人五衰)
- Man'yōshū (万叶集)
- (Jun'ichirō Tanizaki) (黑白)
- Rashōmon (Ryūnosuke Akutagawa) (罗生门)
- The Holy Man of Mount Kōya (Kyōka Izumi) (高野圣僧)
- (Natsume Sōseki) (杂忆录)
- (Seichō Matsumoto) (日本的黑雾)
- (Seichō Matsumoto) (深层海流)
- (Junichi Watanabe) (魂断阿寒)
- Les Misérables (Victor Hugo) (悲惨世界)
- Ulysses (James Joyce) (尤利西斯)
- Stories from the Bible (Mary Batchelor) (圣经故事)

== Works ==
- Memories of Old Friends in the Wind and Rain (风雨忆故人)
- A Lifetime of Love (一生的情缘)
- Letters to Family (萧乾家书)
- Bajin and Xiao Qian (巴金与萧乾)

== Awards ==
- Japanese Foreign Minister Recognition Award (2000)
- The Order of the Sacred Treasure (2002)
- Chinese Translation Association – Lifetime Achievement Award (2012)
