= He Jianming =

Chinese author

He Jianming (Chinese: 何建明; born 1956) is a Chinese non-fiction author.

== Career ==
He Jianming has published over 50 books, the majority of which are creative nonfiction works focusing on Chinese society from 1978, when the reform and opening up began, to the present day. He has won the Lu Xun Literary Prize three times. He is currently vice chair of the China Writers Association.

== Writings ==
He Jianming's publications include:

- The Country
- Fidelity and Betrayal
- Fundamental Interests
- Falling Tears are Gold
- Nanjing 1937: Memories of a Massacre (English translation)
