= Gui Yufang =

Chinese translator (1930–2022)

- 桂裕芳
- Born: 21 September 1930; Wuhan, Hubei, China
- Died: 22 December 2022 (aged 92)
- Education: Tsinghua University; Peking University
- Occupation: Translator
- Writing career
- Language: Chinese, French
- Period: 1953–2022
- Genre: Novel
- Notable work: The Complete Works of Maupassant

Gui Yufang (Chinese: 桂裕芳; pinyin: Guì Yùfāng; 21 September 1930 – 22 December 2022) was a Chinese translator. She was one of the foremost translators into Chinese of the works of the French novelist Guy de Maupassant.

== Biography ==
Gui was born in Wuhan, Hubei in 1930. She entered Tsinghua University in 1949, majoring in French at the Department of Foreign Language, where she graduated in 1952.

In 1952, universities in China underwent a nationwide reshuffling. She was educated at the Department of French Language, Peking University from 1952 to 1953. After graduation, Gui taught at Peking University. Gui started to publish works in 1957.

In 1966, the Cultural Revolution was launched by Mao Zedong, she was sent to the May Seventh Cadre Schools to work with her children in Jiangxi.

In 1976, Hua Guofeng and Ye Jianying toppled the Gang of Four, she was rehabilitated, she returned to Beijing and taught at Peking University.

Gui retired in 1997. She died on 22 December 2022, at the age of 92.

== Translation ==
- The Complete Works of Maupassant (Guy de Maupassant) (莫泊桑全集)
- In Search of Lost Time (Marcel Proust) (追忆逝水年华)
- (Marcel Proust) (在少女花影下：斯万夫人周围)
- Little Good-For-Nothing (Alphonse Daudet) (小东西)
- French: La Modification (Michelle Buto) (变)
- Childhood (Natalie Sarraute) (童年)
- (Margaret Duras) (夏夜十点半钟)
- (Margaret Duras) (无耻之徒)
- (Margaret Duras) (写作)
- (Francois Mauriac) (爱的荒漠)

== Awards ==
- Chinese Translation Association – Competent Translator (2004)
