= Wei Wei (female writer) =

Chinese writer

Wei Wei (魏微) is the pen name of Wei Lili (魏丽丽, born 1970), a Chinese writer. She was born in Shuyang County, Jiangsu, studied in Huai'an and Nanjing, and currently lives in Guangzhou.

== Works translated to English ==
Year	Chinese title	Translated English title	Translator(s)
1998	乔治和一本书	"George's Book"	Alice Xin Liu
2003	大老郑的女人	"Old Zheng's Women"	Vivian H. Zhang
2003	大老郑的女人	"Big Lao Zheng's Woman"	Zhang Xiaorong
2003	化妆	"The Great Masque"	Zhang Xiaorong
2006	在明孝陵乘凉	"Enjoying the Cool at the Ming Xiaoling Mausoleum"	Zhang Xiaorong
2012	胡文青传	"The Story of Hu Wenqing"	Katharine Poundstone

"Big Lao Zheng's Woman" won the 3rd Lu Xun Literary Prize in 2004.
