= Zhang Hongnian =

Chinese translator (1931–2015)

- 张鸿年
- Born: December 1931; Yongqing County, Hebei, China
- Died: 2 March 2015 (aged 83)
- Education: Peking University
- Occupation: Translator
- Writing career
- Language: Chinese, Russian, Persian
- Period: 1960–2015
- Genres: Poem, novel
- Notable work: Shahnameh

Zhang Hongnian (simplified Chinese: 张鸿年; traditional Chinese: 張鴻年; pinyin: Zhāng Hóngnián; December 1931 – 2 March 2015) was a Chinese translator who had been honored by the Iranian Government.

Zhang was one of the foremost translators of Persian Literature. For his contributions to the introduction of Persian Literature to foreign readers, he was honored with the International Persian Literature Award in 1992, 6th Literature and Art Award in 1998 and the Outstanding Award for Chinese and Persian Culture Exchange in 2000.

== Biography ==
Zhang was born in Yongqing County, Hebei in December 1931.

Zhang graduated from Peking University in 1960, where he majored in Russian and Persian.

In 1986, Zhang studied in Iran.

Zhang died from heart failure at home on 2 March 2015, at the age of 83.

== Works ==
- History of Persian Literature (波斯文学史)
- Shahnameh (Ferdowsi) (列王纪全集)
- Gulistan of Sa'di (Saadi Shirazi) (果园)
- Rubaiyat of Omar Khayyam (Omar Khayyám) (鲁拜集)
- (四类英才)

== Awards ==
- Tehran University – International Persian Literature Award (1992)
- Afshar Foundation – 6th Literature and Art Award (1998)
- Iranian President Mohammad Khatami awarded him the Outstanding Award for Chinese and Persian Culture Exchange (2000)
- Chinese Translation Association – Competent Translator (2004)
