= Yuan Changying =

Chinese writer (1894–1973)

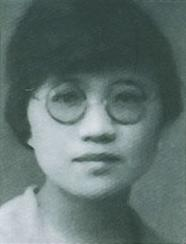
- Born: 11 October 1894; Liling
- Died: 28 April 1973 (aged 78); Liling
- Alma mater: University of Edinburgh
- Children: Yang Jingyuan

Yuan Changying (Chinese:袁昌英; 11 October 1894 – 28 April 1973) was a Chinese writer. She was the first Chinese woman to graduate from the University of Edinburgh and the first Chinese woman to be a Master's student in Britain. She is best known for her collection of plays - Southeast Flies the Peacock.

== Personal life ==
On 11 October 1894, Yuan Changying was born in the city of Liling in Hunan. Her father Yuan Jiapu was educated at Waseda University. Yuan's mother died when Yuan was young. Her father remarried and had a son and another daughter. Yuan married Chinese economist Yang Duanliu (杨端六) who she met when he was studying at the University of London. After graduating from University of Edinburgh in 1921, Yuan returned to China with Yang. In February 1923 in Changsha, Yuan gave birth to their daughter Yang Jingyuan (杨静远). Later on, Yuan gave birth to their son Yang Hongyuan (杨弘远).

== Education ==
In 1916, Yuan started attending Blackheath High School in London. From 1916 to 1921, Yuan studied at the University of Edinburgh, where she earned a Master's Degree in English drama and literature. Her master's thesis was about William Shakespeare’s Hamlet.

== Career ==
In 1922, she started teaching women at Beijing Normal University.

In 1928, Yuan became a professor at Wuhan University in the School of Chinese Language and Literature. While at Wuhan University, she worked and befriended Su Xuelin and Ling Shuhua and the three of them were known together as the "Three Female Talents of Luojia Mountain," the "Three Heroines of Luojia,” or "The Three Musketeers of Luojia." She also taught at the China University of Political Science and Law.

In 1930, she published Southeast Flies the Peacock, which was a collection of Chinese plays in the "spoken drama" style instead of in an opera style. Yuan's nickname - "the peacock of Liling" - originated from her 1930 collection. In 1935, students at Wuhan University performed Southeast Flies the Peacock. Yuan was also a part of a literary group called The Crescent Moon Society.

In 1931, she accused Hong Shen of plagiarism in her article "Zhuang shi huangdi he Zhao yanwang." Hong Shen would deny these accusations.

Later in life, Yuan became a member of Chinese Democratic League.

== Death ==
In 1973, she died in Liling.

== Legacy ==
The University of Edinburgh honored Changying by naming The Yuan Changying Prize after her. The Yuan Changying Prize recognizes outstanding ‘gender observations’ written by undergraduate students in Edinburgh's "Understanding Gender in the Contemporary World" class.
