= Wei Huangnu =

Chinese translator

Wei Shaozhen
- 魏绍珍
- Born: August 2, 1918; Wuji County, Hebei, China
- Died: December 9, 2006 (aged 88); Beijing, China
- Education: Zunyi Foreign Studies College
- Occupation: Translator
- Writing career
- Pen name: Wei Huangnu (魏荒弩)
- Language: Chinese, Russian, Esperanto
- Period: 1938–2006
- Genres: Poem, novel
- Notable work: Collected Works of Nekrasov

Wei Shaozhen (simplified Chinese: 魏绍珍; traditional Chinese: 魏紹珍; pinyin: Wèi Shào Zhēn; August 2, 1918 – December 9, 2006) better known by his pen name Wei Huangnu (魏荒弩; Wèi Huāngnǔ), was a Chinese translator and professor.

He was among the first few in China who translated the works of Nikolay Nekrasov's into Chinese language.

== Early life ==
Wei was born as Shao Zhen in Wuji County, Hebei, China on August 2, 1918.

== Education ==
During his early years, Wei learned Esperanto by himself.

Wei graduated from Zunyi Foreign Studies College (遵义外国语学院) in 1940, where he majored in Russian language.

== Career ==
In 1938, Wei started to public sh his wo ks. Wei worked in Fenglin Literature and Art (枫林文艺) and Poetry and Literature (诗文学) as the chief editor.

Wei joined the China Writers Association in 1949.

After the founding of the Communist State, Wei became a professor at Peking University.

He died in 2006.

== Works ==
- Lizhaiyumo (枥斋余墨)
- Poetry of Czech Republic (捷克诗歌选)
- Collected Stories of Czech Republic (捷克小说选)
- Poetry of Russian (俄国诗选)
- Poetry of Nekrasov (Nikolay Nekrasov) (涅克拉索夫诗选)
- Collected Works of Nekrasov (Nikolay Nekrasov) (涅克拉索夫文集（三卷）)
- Poetry of Decemberrists (十二月党人诗选)

== Awards ==
- Collected Works of Nekrasov – National Foreign Literature Book Award
- Chinese Translation Association – Senior Translator (2004)
