= Xiao Qian =

Chinese writer, editor, reporter

- 萧乾
- Xiao Qian
- Born: Xiao Bingqian (蕭秉乾 or 萧炳乾); 27 January 1910; Beijing, Qing Empire
- Died: 11 February 1999 (aged 89); Beijing, China
- Education: Yenching University; Fu Jen Catholic University
- Occupations: Writer, translator
- Spouse(s): Wang Shucang; Xie Gewen; Mei Tao Wen Jieruo (m. 1954; died 1999)
- Writing career
- Language: Chinese, English
- Period: 1935–1999
- Genres: Short stories, essays

Chinese name
- Simplified Chinese: 萧乾
- Traditional Chinese: 蕭乾
Transcriptions
Standard Mandarin
- Hanyu Pinyin: Xiāo Qián
- Wade–Giles: Hsiao Ch'ien

Xiao Bingqian
- Simplified Chinese: 萧秉乾
- Traditional Chinese: 蕭秉乾
Transcriptions
Standard Mandarin
- Hanyu Pinyin: Xiāo Bǐngqián

Xiao Bingqian
- Simplified Chinese: 萧炳乾
- Traditional Chinese: 蕭炳乾
Transcriptions
Standard Mandarin
- Hanyu Pinyin: Xiāo Bǐngqián

Xiao Ruoping
- Simplified Chinese: 萧若萍
- Traditional Chinese: 蕭若萍
Transcriptions
Standard Mandarin
- Hanyu Pinyin: Xiāo Ruòpíng

Xiao Qian (Chinese: 萧乾; born Xiao Bingqian (Chinese: 蕭秉乾); 27 January 1910 – 11 February 1999), also known by the alias Ruoping (若萍), was a Chinese essayist, editor, journalist and translator. His life spanned the country's history before and after the establishment of the People's Republic of China.

== Biography ==
=== Early years ===
Xiao was born on 27 January 1910 in Beijing. His name at birth was Xiao Bingqian (蕭秉乾). He was born into a sinicized Mongol family. His father died before his birth, leaving only his mother to raise him. His mother died when he was seven, and he was sent to live with his cousins.

=== School days ===
In 1917, at the age of 7, Xiao entered the Chongshi School (崇实小学). It was a church school run by European missionaries. He took up part-time jobs to pay the tuition fees (e.g. weaving Turkish rugs, delivering milk and mimeographing lecture notes in the school administration office). He worked in the morning and studied in the afternoon. In summer 1924, about half a year before completing junior middle school, he worked as a trainee in Beixin Press bookstore. This sparked his interest in literature. In the same year he joined the Communist Youth League.

In 1931 Xiao enrolled at Fu Jen Catholic University. Together with an American youth William Allen he published a magazine in English China in Brief (中國簡報, Zhōngguó Jiǎnbào). It presented works of famous authors such as Lu Xun, Mao Dun, Guo Moruo, Wen Yiduo and Yu Dafu. Due to insufficient funding the magazine ended after eight issues, but it influenced the foreign readers in Beijing. In this period he became a student of Shen Congwen, who greatly influenced Xiao's early writings.

In 1933 Xiao entered the Faculty of English in Yenching University and in autumn of the same year he switched to the Faculty of Journalism. His teacher was an American journalist Edgar Snow. Snow encouraged him to use various literary techniques in journalistic reporting, which became characteristic to Xiao's writing. He graduated in June 1936 and continued the studies as a postgraduate student at Cambridge University. Soon after he became a lecturer at University College London.

=== Life in England ===
In 1939, at the age of 28, Xiao Qian returned to England to work as an instructor in modern Chinese language for the School of Oriential and African Studies (SOAS) in London. SOAS was moved to Cambridge when Germany began the devastating bombing campaign Blitz.

Xiao Qian was politically active and made regular speeches for the China Campaign Committee, a left-wing group which campaigned against the Japanese occupation in China.

=== Marriage and family ===
He married four times. In 1936 he met his first wife Wang Shucang (王树藏) while working on the Shanghai edition of the Ta Kung Pao. The couple only stayed together for two years before he fell in love with another woman during his stay in Hong Kong. They had an extramarital son born in 1948. Xiao tried to get a divorce, but Wang opposed it and as a result Xiao Qian left China for England.

In 1954, Xiao married his fourth wife, Wen Jieruo (文杰若). They had two sons and a daughter. On 30 January 1955 the daughter Xiao Lizi (萧荔子) was born.

=== Later years ===
During the Cultural Revolution (1966–1976) Xiao Qian was regarded by the Chinese Communist Party as right wing and was banished to the countryside. In 1968 he tried to commit suicide. In 1978 he received a redress as one of the mishandled cases. In 1979 he was a resident in the International Writing Program at the University of Iowa.

In 1999 Xiao Qian died at the age of 89 of myocardial infarction and renal failure in Beijing.

== Personal life ==
Xiao had a child named Xiao Tiezhu (萧铁柱) with Xie Gewen (谢格温).

Xiao married translator Wen Jieruo in the spring of 1954, the couple has two sons and a daughter. Their daughter Xiao Lizi (萧荔子) was born on 30 January 1955. Their son, Xiao Tong (萧桐), was born on November 10, 1956. All of her children are living in the United States.

== Major works of journalism ==
=== Feature articles ===
Between the 1940s and the 1990s, Xiao wrote many famous articles. Many of his published feature reports are distinctive for their combination of news-accuracy and literary style of writing.

The early reports are considered of great historical value by the academic community in China and are currently in the care of the Chinese Literature Society. Most of Xiao's featured reports were based on first hand experience from the front line. He selected scenes that he believed would reflect society at that time. He also used contour drawing to vividly depict events, display emotions, and illustrate the story for the reader. His work acts like a camera, capturing moments of real life. Not only did his reports offer insights into the harsh realities of the time, they also reflected his deep sentiments toward his country and its people.

=== Wartime writings ===
The following books were written between 1939 and 1946 and reflected Xiao Qian's experience during the Second World War while he was living in the United Kingdom and Western Europe:

1. Symphony of Contradictions
2. Bloody September
3. London under Silver Kites

These works were mostly concerned with the day-to-day life of ordinary English citizens. They contained an analysis or speculation about political and military matters. While he was impressed by the determination of the English to defeat Germany, he also observed their negative cultural traits.

== Major works of literature ==
=== Popular publications ===
As a journalist, he wrote a variety of publications. One of them is his book: xin bian wen shi biji cong shu (新编文史笔记丛书). The series contains 50 books, in which 6,000,000 words were written. These series were written between the 1980s and early 1990s. The books collected a range of anecdotes and highlights from over 2000 celebrities and researchers. The series became highly reputable and widely accepted when it was released. As the last volume of the series published in October 1994, another edition of the series were published in Hong Kong and Taiwan shortly after. The work was awarded the "Chinese Book Prize" in 1993.

=== Essays ===
In addition to his books Xiao also wrote several notable essays.

Though Xiao wrote no more than 20 essays, they played a very important role in the development of Chinese essay history. All his works were published under the name of "Tatamulin", an exiled Latvian merchant, between the years 1946 and 1948. His essays were satirical and often contained criticisms of contemporary political issues at that time.

His essays also include a considerable amount of poetry which express his strong feelings toward China at that time. The sole purpose of all his essays was to end the political dictatorship of the Kuomintang in China, and thus promote a peaceful, democratic Utopia. His magnum opus is "Long talk by red hair" (红毛长谈, hóngmáo chángtán). In the polarised political climate of that time in China, his two essays — "Ease, tolerance & personnel work" (放心, 容忍, 人事工作) and "Why do people's presses become the government offices?" (人民的出版社为甚么变成衙门) — caused him to be labelled a rightist in 1957.

=== Translations ===
Apart from his work as a journalist and a writer, Xiao also translated important works of European literature into Mandarin Chinese. He translated several books and plays by William Shakespeare, Stephen Leacock and Henrik Ibsen. These were widely published in mainland China and Taiwan.

In 1990, as invited by Nanjing YiLin Publication (南京译林出版社), he translated Ulysses by James Joyce into Mandarin, assisted by his wife Wen Jieruo, who was fluent in both English and Japanese. When the book was released in 1994, it became a surprise best-seller in China. Because of this, he received the Caihong Translation Prize (彩虹翻译奖) and the Best Foreign Literature Book-First Class (全国优秀外国文学图书一等奖).

== Beliefs ==
=== As an author ===
Xiao views were shaped by the poverty and hardships of his childhood. He witnessed the suffering of the lower classes at first hand. His reports attempted to address the injustices and disparity in Chinese society.

Xiao strongly believed that the truth is what moves people, and his writings often encouraged his readers to come to their own conclusions. His writings Lu Xi Liu Ming Tu (鲁西流民图) and Lin Yan Fa Ru Yu (林炎发入狱) best illustrate his beliefs.

=== As a journalist ===
Xiao entered the field of journalism in April 1935. He first worked for Tianjin's Ta Kung Pao, where he published his early writings including his first novel, as an editor for "Literary Arts" (《文藝》版). In 1936, he moved to Shanghai to prepare for the publication of Shanghai's Takung Pao. Then in 1938, when full-scale war against the Japanese broke out in China, Xiao was offered a job by the Ta Kung Pao in Hong Kong to work as an editor and journalist.

Later in 1939, he traveled to London, and continued his job as a journalist for Ta Kung Pao until 1946. While the British took part in the Second World War, he gave up his place at the University of Cambridge in 1944, and became the only Chinese war correspondent in Western Europe.

As World War II came to an end, he produced a number of reportages such as "Symphony of Contradictions," "Bloody September" and "London under Silver Kites", which all reflected the (often harsh) reality during wartime. Thereafter, he worked for several newspaper companies such as the English version of People's China (人民中国).

While being a journalist in the World War II, Xiao entered Rhine with the 7th troop of the Allied Forces. When the Allied Forces entered Berlin, Xiao was one of the first journalists who entered the city. He attended and collected news from the Potsdam Conference in July 1945, which was one of the most significant conferences marking the end of the World War II.

In May 1945, Xiao gained fame after writing a piece of exclusive news about Vyacheslav Molotov inviting T. V. Soong to sign the Sino-Soviet Treaty of Friendship and Alliance during his trip to San Francisco while reporting on the United Nations Conference. He was also involved in the reporting of the trials of Nazis in Nuremberg, Germany.

== Literary friends ==
According to Xiao's autobiography, he met the English novelist E.M. Forster, on 9 May 1941 at the Tagore Memorial Meeting. The event was organized by the English PEN Club. The two became very close friends and often exchanged letters. They disagreed with each other over the issue of homosexuality (Xiao was opposed to legalization).

The friendship, however, did not last. Xiao, fearing for the safety of his family during the Cultural Revolution, destroyed all the letters he had received from Forster and asked Forster not to contact him again. Because Forster might have assumed that Xiao was ignoring him, he burned some of the letters he had kept as a memento of their friendship.

== Bibliography (Translations) ==
- Selected Master Pieces by Xiao Qian 萧乾作品精选 (ed. Wen Jieruo 文洁若) Beijing : Beijing Language and Culture University Press 北京语言大学出版社, 2001. 382 pages. ISBN 7-5619-0999-3. (Bilingual version with Chinese original and English translation: 《蚕》、《篱下》、《雨夕》、《破车上》、《雁荡行》、《血红的九月》、《矛盾交响曲》、《银风筝下的伦敦》等近二十篇文学作品。)
