= Wang Huansheng =

Chinese translator (born 1939)

- 王焕生
- Born: 1939 (age 86–87); Nantong, Jiangsu, China
- Education: Beijing Foreign Studies University; Moscow State University
- Occupation: Translator
- Writing career
- Language: Chinese, English, Classical Greek, Latin, Russian
- Period: 1965–present
- Notable works: Iliad; Odyssey
- Notable awards: 4th National Book Award; 1999 Iliad and Odyssey; 2nd Lu Xun Literature Prize for Translation; 2001 Odyssey

Wang Huansheng (simplified Chinese: 王焕生; traditional Chinese: 王煥生; pinyin: Wāng Huànshēng; born 1939) is a Chinese translator. He writes in English, Classical Greek, Latin and Russian. Wang was a researcher of the Chinese Academy of Social Science and is a member of the China Writers Association.

Wang is among the first few in China who translated the Homeric Hymns from Classical Greek into the Chinese language.

== Biography ==
Wang was born in 1939. He entered Beijing Foreign Studies University in 1959, majoring in Russian language. In 1960, Wang studied in Moscow State University, majoring in ancient Greek and Roman literature, where he graduated in 1965.

== Works ==
- The History of Ancient Roman Literature (古罗马文学史)
- The History of Ancient Roman Literature and Arts (古罗马文艺批评史纲)

=== Translations ===
- Aesop's Fables (伊索寓言)
- Iliad (荷马史诗：伊利亚特)
- Odyssey (荷马史诗：奥德赛)
- Elegiae (哀歌集)
- Meditations (沉思录)

== Awards ==
- Iliad and Odyssey – 4th National Book Award (1999)
- Odyssey – 2nd Lu Xun Literature Prize for Translation (2001)
