= Xu Kun =

Chinese postmodern fiction writer (born 1965)

Xu Kun (徐坤; born 1965) is a Chinese postmodern fiction writer based in Beijing. She is currently the deputy chair of Beijing Writers Association. She was born in Shenyang and holds a Ph.D. in literature from Chinese Academy of Social Sciences. She received her bachelor's and master's degrees from Liaoning University.

== Works translated to English ==
Year	Chinese title	Translated English title	Translator(s)
1997	厨房	"Kitchen"	Richard King
1997	厨房	"Kitchen"	Vivian H. Zhang
1997	厨房	"The Kitchen"	Zhang Ruiqing
1997	厨房	"The Kitchen"	Lin Bin
1999	爱人同志	"My Beloved Comrade"	Chen Haiyan
2005	午夜广场最后的探戈	"Last Tango in the Square One Midsummer Night"	Ji Hua, Gao Wenxing
2006	销签	"Visa Cancelling"	Roddy Flagg

"Kitchen" received the Lu Xun Literary Prize in 2000.
