= Liu Anwu =

Chinese translator

- 刘安武
- Born: 12 July 1930; Changde, Hunan, China
- Died: 9 August 2018 (aged 88); Beijing, China
- Education: Hunan University; Peking University; Delhi University; Banaras Hindu University
- Occupations: Translator, professor
- Writing career
- Language: Chinese, Hindi language, English
- Period: 1980–2018
- Genre: Novel
- Notable work: The Complete Works of Tagore

Liu Anwu (simplified Chinese: 刘安武; traditional Chinese: 劉安武; pinyin: Liǘ ānwǔ; 12 July 1930 – 9 August 2018) was a Chinese translator who is the honorary president of China Indian Literature Research Association. Liu also a professor in Indian literature at Peking University, Nanjing Institute of International Relations and Shenzhen University.

He was one of the main translators of the works of the Indian novelist and poet Rabindranath Tagore into Chinese.

== Biography ==
Liu was born in Changde, Hunan in July 1930. Liu attended Changde County School (常德县立中学) in 1943. Liu secondary studied at the Hunan Provincial No.4 High School (湖南省立四中). Liu entered Hunan University in 1949, majoring in Chinese language, he was accepted to Peking University in 1951, where he majored in Hindi language.

In 1954, Liu was sent abroad to study at the expense of the government, he studied at Delhi University and Banaras Hindu University.

Liu returned to China in 1958, then he taught at Peking University.

Liu started to publish works in 1980 and he joined the China Writers Association in 1988.

Liu retired in 2000.

== Translation ==
- The Complete Works of Tagore (Rabindranath Tagore) (泰戈尔全集)
- Newly married (新婚)
- Pleasant Tree (如意树)
- The Woman of Mowing (割草的女人)
- Selected Short Stories of Munshi Premchand (Munshi Premchand) (普列姆昌德短篇小说选)

== Works ==
- History of Indian Hindi Literature (印度印地语文学史)
- Critical Biography of Munshi Premchand (普列姆昌德评传)
- Indian Literature and Chinese Literature (印度文学和中国文学的比较研究)

== Awards ==
- Chinese Translation Association – Competent Translator (2004)
