= Li Yeguang =

Chinese translator

- 李野光
- Born: Li Guangjian (李光鉴); December 19, 1924; Lianyuan, Hunan, China
- Died: July 21, 2014 (aged 89); Hemet, California, United States
- Education: Peking University
- Occupation: Translator
- Spouse: Dai Kan
- Children: 3
- Writing career
- Pen name: Luo Mo (骆漠)
- Language: Chinese, English
- Period: 1942–2014
- Genres: Poem, novel
- Notable works: Leaves of Grass; Gone With the Wind

Li Yeguang (Chinese: 李野光; pinyin: Lǐ Yěguāng; December 19, 1924 – July 21, 2014) also known by his pen name Luo Mo (骆漠; 駱漠; Luò Mò), was a Chinese translator.

He was one of the main translators of the works of the American poet Walt Whitman into Chinese.

== Biography ==
Li was born Li Guangjian (李光鉴; 李光鑒; Lǐ Guāngjiàn) in Lianyuan, Hunan in 1924.

Li started to publish works in 1942.

Li graduated from Peking University in 1951, where he majored in English. After graduation, Li was appointed an editor to the Chinese Academy of Social Sciences.

After the Cultural Revolution, Li joined the China Writers Association in 1979.

On July 21, 2014, Li died at his home in Hemet, California, United States.

== Personal life ==
Li was married to Dai Kan in 1951 with three daughters: Li Xiaoyin, Li Xiaoya, Li Xiaoli.

== Works ==
- Leaves of Grass (Walt Whitman) (草叶集)
- The Biography of Walt Whitman (惠特曼评传)
- Gone With the Wind (Margaret Mitchell) (飘)
- The Lincoln Couple (Irving Stone) (林肯夫妇)

== Awards ==
- Chinese Translation Association – Competent Translator (2004)
