= Tu An =

Chinese poet and translator

- 屠岸
- Born: Jiang Bihou (蒋壁厚); 22 November 1923; Changzhou, Jiangsu, China
- Died: 16 December 2017 (aged 94); Beijing, China
- Education: Shanghai Jiaotong University
- Occupations: Poet, translator
- Spouse: Zhang Miaoying
- Children: 3
- Relatives: Jiang Ji (father)
- Writing career
- Pen name: Tu'an (屠岸); Shumou (叔牟)
- Language: Chinese, English
- Period: 1941–2017
- Genre: Poetry
- Notable works: Poetry of John Keats; Tu'an's Sonnets
- Notable awards: 2nd Lu Xun Literary Prize

Jiang Bihou (simplified Chinese: 蒋壁厚; traditional Chinese: 蔣壁厚; pinyin: Jiǎng Bìhoù; 22 November 1923 – 16 December 2017), better known by his pen name Tu An (屠岸; Tú'àn), was a Chinese poet and translator. He was a member of China Writers Association.

Jiang was the first person from China to write a sonnet in Chinese and among the first few in China who translated the works of John Keats into the Chinese language.

His translations are well respected by domestic and overseas scholars. His translation work, Poetry of John Keats, which won the 2nd Lu Xun Literary Prize.

== Biography ==
Jiang was born into a scholarly family in November 1923 in Changzhou, Jiangsu. His father Jiang Ji (蒋骥) was an architect who graduated from Tokyo Institute of Technology. His granduncle, Tu Ji (屠寄), was a scholar and historian; his uncle, Tu Kuan (屠宽), was an educator and politician.

When he was a child, his mother taught him Chinese literature. Jiang started to publish works in 1941. He graduated from Shanghai Jiaotong University in 1946. Jiang joined the China Writers Association in 1956.

In July 1956, Jiang published an article named "Wanzhuan De Cubao" (婉转的粗暴) in People's Daily. In the article, he criticized many Party cadres do not understand the Chinese opera, but often negate a performance or "shot" a play.

In January 1958, Jiang was sent to Huailai County, Hebei to "reform through labour".

In 1966, the Cultural Revolution was launched by Mao Zedong, Jiang experienced mistreatment and suffered political persecution, he was brought to be persecuted with his wife, and he was sent to work in Huailai, Hebei. Jiang was rehabilitated in July 1972. In 1973, Jiang was assigned to the People's Literature Publishing House.

He died on 16 December 2017, aged 94.

== Works ==
- Poetry of John Keats (济慈诗选)
- Tu'an's Sonnets (屠岸十四行诗)

== Award ==
- Poetry of John Keats - 2nd Lu Xun Literary Prize

== Personal life ==
Jiang married Zhang Miaoying (章妙英), who was a Chinese author and editor graduated from Saint John's University, she died in 1998. The couple had three children.
