= Wen Meihui =

Chinese translator (born 1931)

- 文美惠
- Born: 1931 (age 94–95); Wuhan, Hubei, China
- Education: Peking University
- Occupation: Translator
- Spouse: Lin Hongliang
- Writing career
- Pen name: Lin Zhi (林之)
- Language: Chinese, English
- Period: 1956–1999
- Genre: Novel
- Notable work: The Jungle Book

Wen Meihui (Chinese: 文美惠; pinyin: Wén Měihuì; born 1931) is a Chinese translator. She is a member of the China Democratic League.

She is among the first few in China who translated the works of Joseph Rudyard Kipling's into Chinese language.

== Biography ==
Wen was born in Wuhan, Hubei in 1931, her father was a local officer.

Wen secondary studied at Nankai School (南开中学). She graduated from Peking University in 1953, where she majored in English, she studied English language and literature under Zhu Guangqian, Bian Zhilin and Feng Zhi.

Wen started to publish works in 1956.

In 1966, Mao Zedong launched the Cultural Revolution, Wen was sent to the May Seventh Cadre Schools to work in Yanqing County. After the Cultural Revolution, she was appointed an editor to the Chinese Academy of Social Sciences.

Wen joined the China Writers Association in 1979.

== Works ==
- The Jungle Book (Joseph Rudyard Kipling) (丛林故事)
- Tiger! Tiger! (Joseph Rudyard Kipling) (老虎！老虎！)
- (Joseph Rudyard Kipling) (野兽的烙印)
- The Fox, The Captain's Doll (D. H. Lawrence) (狐)
- (Scotus) (高原的寡妇)
- (Georgette Heyer) (爱与恨的抉择)
- (花衣吹笛人)

== Awards ==
- Chinese Translation Association – Senior Translator (2004)

== Personal life ==
Wen was married to Lin Hongliang (林洪亮), who also a translator.
