= Wen Huanran =

Chinese historical geographer

Wen Huanran (文煥然) (1919/1920 – 1986/1990) was a Chinese historical geographer, who pioneered study in the history of China's natural geography.

== Life ==
Wen Huanran was born in Hunan province in 1919 or 1920. He studied history and geography at Zhejiang University, where he was influenced by the historical graographer Tan Qixiang. After graduating in 1944, he joined the Institute of Geography at the Academia Sinica. His research traced the distribution of plants - such as forests, bamboo and citrus fruits – as well as animals - such as Chinese alligators, peacocks, giant pandas, horses, donkeys, camels, gibbons, rhinoceroses and Asian elephants. His demonstration that wild elephants were once widespread across China, and his charting of their retreat to the Yunnan area, influenced Mark Elvin's book The Retreat of the Elephants.

Wen died in 1986 or 1990. A posthumous collection of Wen's research was published by his son, Wen Rongshen, in 1995.

== Works ==
- (ed. Wen Rongshen) Zhong guo li shi shi qi dong ban nian qi hou leng ai bian qian. Beijing, 1995.
