= Wu Mingji =

Ming Dynasty poet-scholar

Wu Mingji (Chinese: 吴明济) was a 16th-century Chinese scholar from the Shaoxing region. He is best known for the compilation of Chaoxian shi xuan (朝鮮詩選), a collection of several hundred poems written by Korean scholars in classical Chinese.

Much of what is known about Wu Mingji is contained in the preface to Chaoxian shi xuan. Wu visited Korea twice during the Imjin War, as an advisor to the Ming expeditionary army. Wu was able to meet with many of the Korean literati. In 1598, he met with Hŏ Kyun, one of the leading scholars of the Joseon kingdom. Hŏ composed a poem in Wu's honour, in which he celebrated the common brotherhood of men despite their nationalities. On his second tour of Korea, Wu Mingqi made a concerted effort to collect the works of Korean poets.

The final work Wu produced was the Chaoxian shi xuan ("Selected poems from Joseon"), the first Chinese anthology of Korean poetry. It included 340 poems by 112 Korean poets from the Silla period onwards, and was divided into seven parts according to genre. The Chaoxian shi xuan became the subject of scholarly interest in the 17th century, when it was catalogued by bibliographers. The Qing scholar Qian Qianyi incorporated a dozen poems from Wu's collection into his Lidai shiji (歷代詩集), as did Zhu Yizun into his Ming shi zong (明詩綜).

Wu also penned a short history of Goryeo entitled Gaoli shiji ("Temporal record of Goryeo").

== See also ==
- Korean poetry
