= Northwest University (China) =

Public university in Xi'an, Shaanxi, China

- 西北大学
- Motto: 公诚勤朴
- Motto in English: Fairness, Integrity, Diligence and Simplicity
- Type: Public university
- Established: 1912; 114 years ago
- President: Guo Lihong
- Administrative staff: 2,300
- Students: 18,000
- Location: Xi'an, Shaanxi, China; 34°15′00″N 108°55′24″E
- Campus: Urban
- Website: nwu.edu.cn
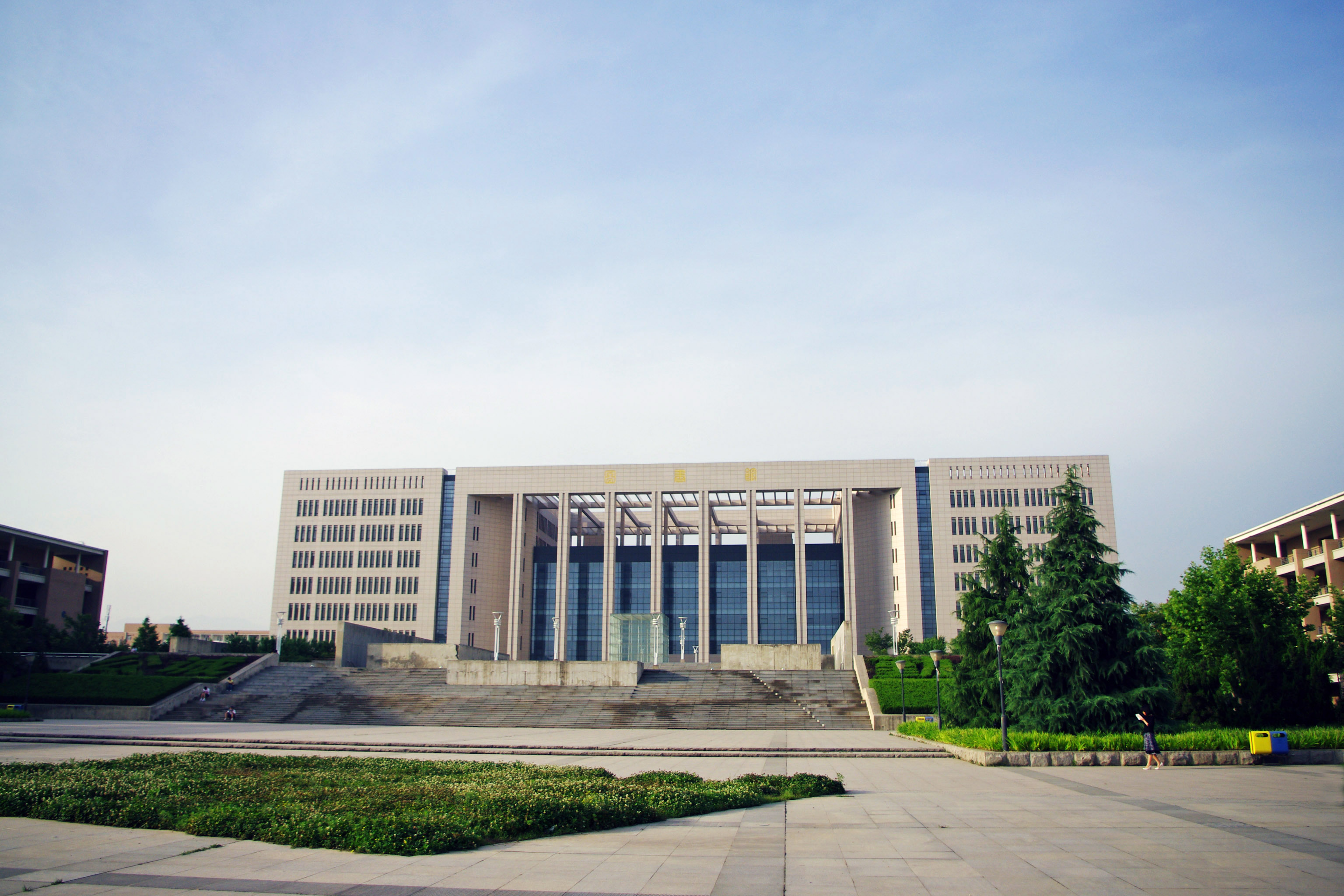

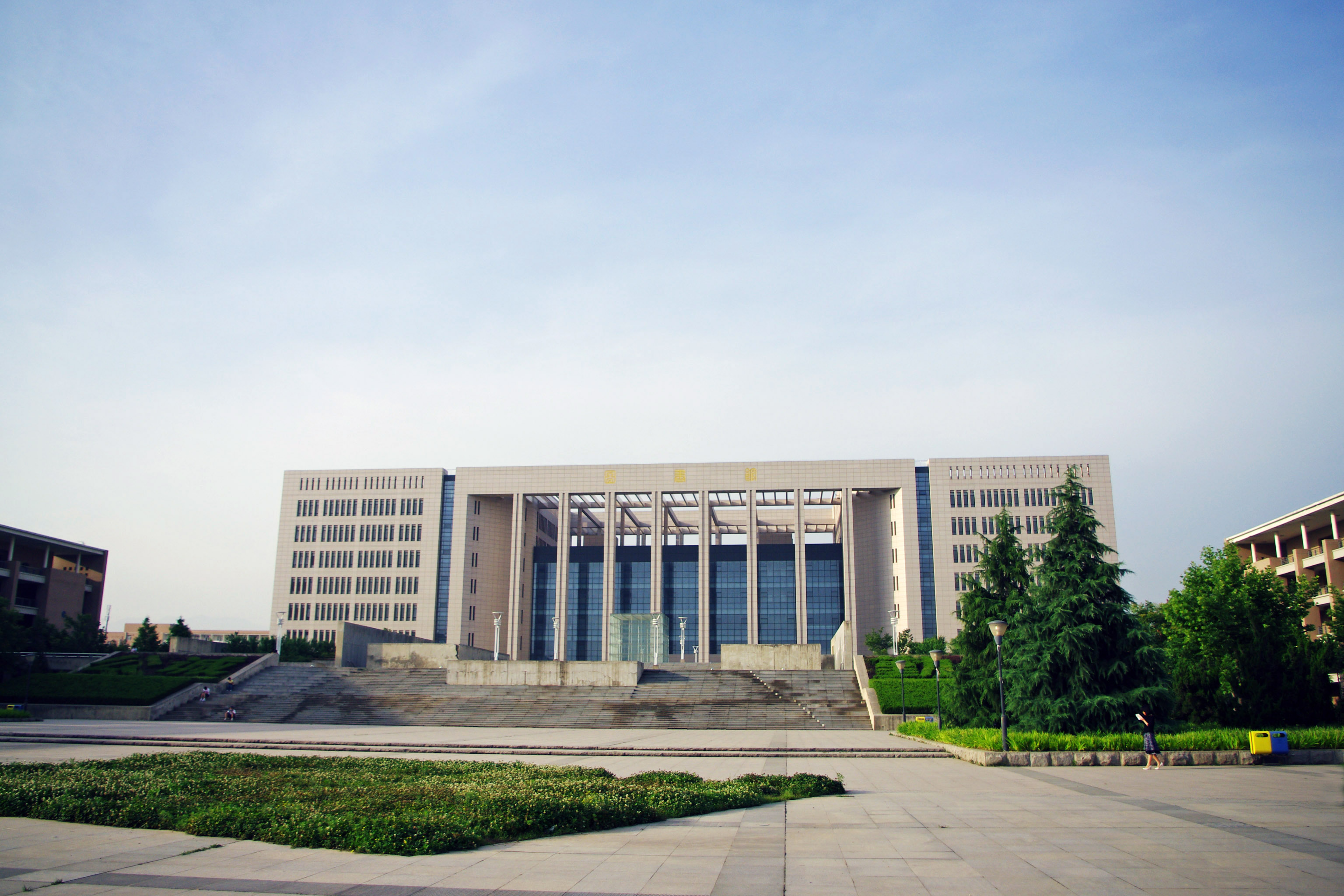
Northwestern University Chang'an Campus Library

Northwest University (Chinese: 西北大学; pinyin: Xīběi Dàxué) is a public university located in Xi'an, Shaanxi, China. It is affiliated with the Province of Shaanxi, and co-funded by the Shaanxi Provincial People's Government and the Ministry of Education. The university is part of Project 211 and the Double First-Class Construction.

== History ==
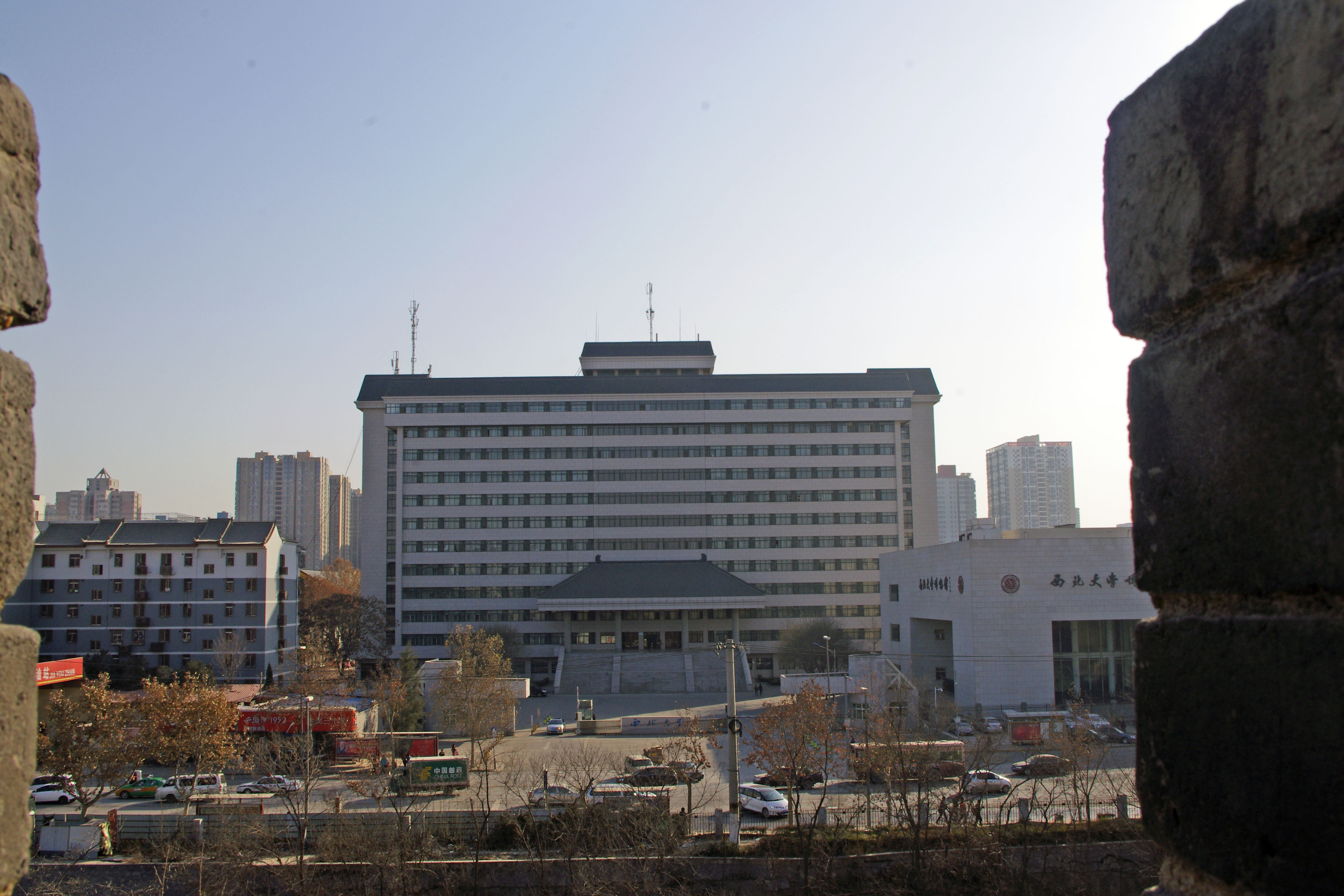
North Gate of Northwestern University Taibai Campus

The earliest predecessor of the school was the Shaanxi University Hall and the Capital University Hall Accelerated Science and Technology School in 1902. The school was first called Northwest University in 1912 and changed its name to National Northwest University in 1923. In 1937, the school formed the National Xi'an Temporary University with the National Peking University, Peking Normal University, Peiyang University College of Engineering, and Peking Research Institute, which moved west to Shaanxi. In 1938, National Xi'an Temporary University was changed to National Northwest Associated University. In 1939, it was renamed National Northwest University. After the war, the universities that had moved to the west moved back. In 1950, the school was renamed Northwest University. In 1988, Chinese University Ranking (CUAA), placed this university as NO.7 in the Science at that time. Today, Northwest University still keeps a leading position on the Chinese language, economic and so on fields.

== Rankings ==
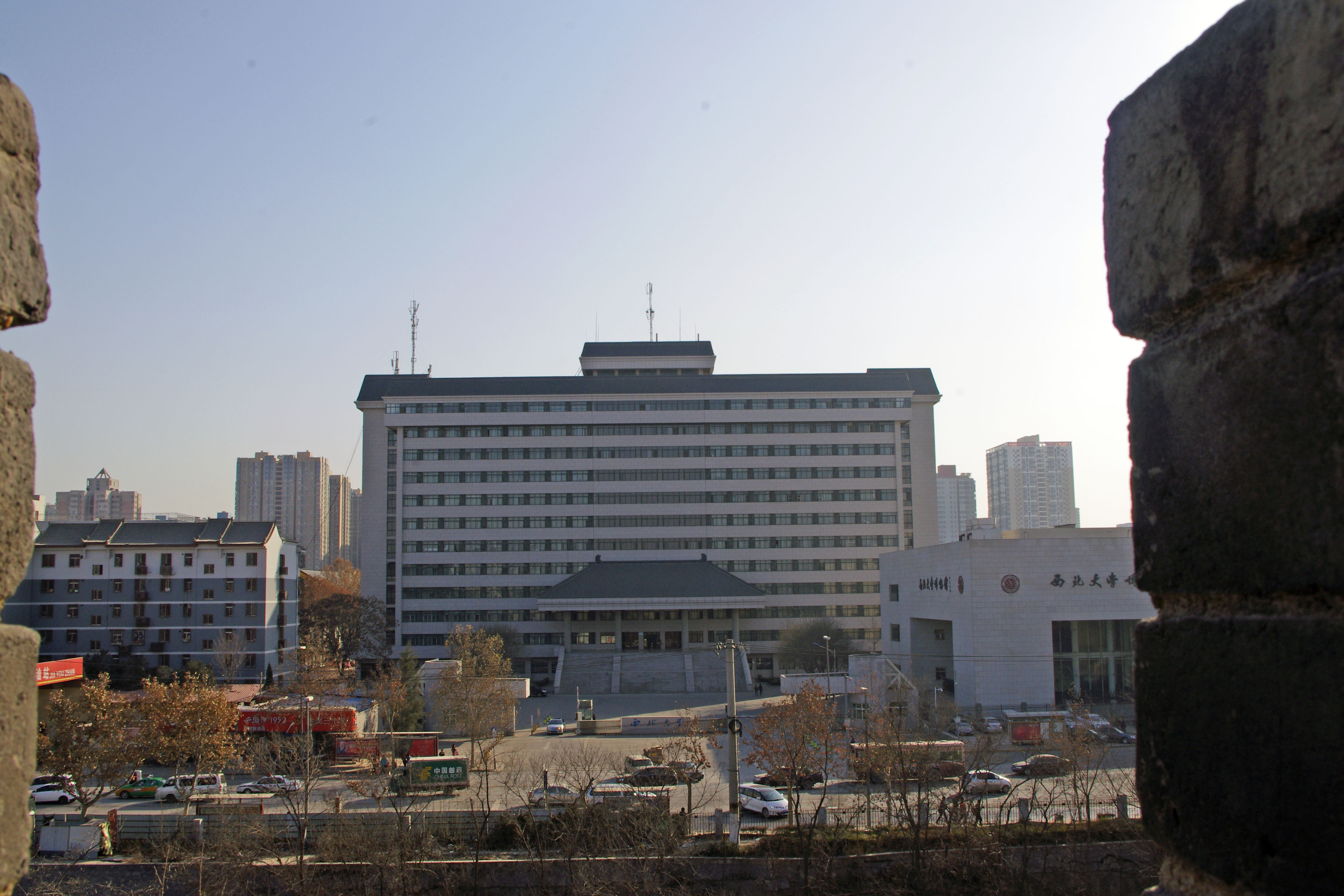
North Gate of Northwestern University Taibai Campus

The QS World University Rankings ranked Northwest University 296th in Asia in 2025.
