= Lu Xun Literary Prize =

Chinese literary award

The Lu Xun Literary Prize (or Lu Xun Literature Prize; Chinese: 鲁迅文学奖) is a literary prize awarded by China Writers Association. It is one of China's top four literary prizes and is named after Lu Xun and has been awarded every four years since 1995. Its predecessor, the National Outstanding Short Story Award and National Outstanding Novella Award, was established since the beginning of the new-era literature in the early 1980s.

Some of the critics believe that the credibility of "Lu Xun Literary Prize" is getting worse, and the basic attitude of their criticisms is that the "Lu Xun Literary Prize" has nothing to do with the "Lu Xun's Spirit", and "lacks specific standards", "is a black box operation", and "is a money-for-award transaction". The prize should be awarded to the really outstanding writers, and the process of appraisal and election should be transparent.

The 2010 Lu Xun literature prize 5th Award Ceremony was held in Shaoxing on October 19, 2010. Che Yangao, secretary of the discipline inspection committee in Hubei's capital city of Wuhan, won the award for his collection of poems "Yearning for Warmth."

The Prize has seven award categories:

- National Excellent Novella Award
- National Excellent Short Story Award
- National Excellent Reportage Award
- National Outstanding Poetry Award
- National Excellent Prose Essay Prize
- National Outstanding Literary Review Awards
- National Outstanding Literary Translation Award (formerly the Rainbow Translation Award)

In 2010, online works became eligible for consideration of the Lu Xun Literary Prize.

== 1st Awards (1995-1996) ==
The following translated titles are approximate.
National Excellent Short Story Award, 1995—1996

- 史铁生: 《老屋小记》 Shi Tiesheng: Memory of the old house
- 迟子建: 《雾月牛栏》 Chi Zijian: Cowpen in the foggy moon
- 阿 成: 《赵一曼女士》 Ah Cheng: Ms Zhao Yiman
- 陈世旭: 《镇长之死》 Chen Shixu: Death of the mayor
- 毕飞宇: 《哺乳期的女人》 Bi Feiyu: Lactating women
- 池 莉: 《心比身先老》 Chi Li: The heart ages before the body

National Excellent Novella Award, 1995—1996

- 邓一光: 《父亲是个兵》 Deng Yiguang: Father is a soldier
- 林 希: 《小的儿》 Lin Xi (writer): Small boy
- 刘醒龙: 《挑担茶叶上北京》 Liu Xinglong: Heading for Beijing, with a basket of tea leaves
- 何 申: 《年前年后》 He Shen (writer): Years before, years after
- 李国文: 《涅槃》 Li Guowen: Nirvana
- 刘 恒: 《天知地知》 Liu Heng: Heaven knows, Earth knows
- 东 西: 《没有语言的生活》 Dong Xi (writer): Life without Language
- 阎连科: 《黄金洞》 Yan Lianke: Gold Cave
- 李贯通: 《天缺一角》 Li Guantong: Missing a corner of sky
- 徐小斌: 《双鱼星座》 Xu Xiaobin: Pisces

National Excellent Reportage Award, 1995—1996

- 邢军纪、 曹 岩: 《锦州之恋》 Xing Junji and Cao Yan: Jinzhou Love
- 杨黎光: 《灵魂何归》（亦名：《没有家园的灵魂》）Yang Liguang: Restless Soul
- 冷 梦: 《黄河大移民》 Leng Meng: Yellow River Immigrants
- 一 合: 《黑脸》 Yi He (writer): Black Face
- 金 辉: 《恸问苍冥》 Jin Hui:
- 江宛柳: 《没有掌声的征途》 Jiang Wanliu: Journey without Applause
- 郭晓晔: 《东方大审判》 Guo Xiaoye: Eastern Trial
- 张建伟: 《温故戊戌年》 Zhang Jianwei:
- 陈桂棣: 《淮河的警告》 Chen Guidi: Huai River warning
- 徐 剑：《大国长剑》 Xu Jian (writer): Long Sword of a Great Kingdom
- 王家达: 《敦煌之恋》 Wang Jiada: Dunhuang Love
- 何建明: 《共和国告急》 He Jianming: Republic Emergency
- 李鸣生: 《走出地球村》 Li Mingsheng: Walking out of the global village
- 程童一 等: 《开埠》 Cheng Tongyi and others: Open Port
- 董葆存: 《毛泽东和蒙哥马利》 Dong Baocun: Mao Zedong and Montgomery

National Excellent Poetry Award, 1995—1996

- 李 瑛: 《生命是一片叶子》 Li Ying (writer): Life is a Leaf
- 匡 满: 《今天没有空难》 Kuang Man: Today there is no air crash
- 韩作荣: 《韩作荣自选集》 Han Zuorong: Han Zuorong's selection of poetry
- 沈 苇: 《在瞬间逗留》 Shen Wei: Lingering in the moment
- 张新泉: 《鸟落民间》 Zhang Xinquan: Bird landing among the people
- 王久辛: 《狂雪》 Wang Jiuxin: Crazy Snow
- 辛 茹: 《寻觅光荣》 Xin Ru: Seeking Glory
- 李松涛: 《拒绝末日》 Li Songtao: Resisting Doomsday

National Excellent Essay Award, 1995—1996

- 冰 心: 《我的家在哪里》 Bing Xin: Where is my home?
- 季羡林: 《赋得永久的悔》 Ji Xianlin: Permanent regret
- 严 秀: 《牵牛花蔓》 Yan Xiu:
- 雷 加: 《半月随笔二集》 Lei Jia (writer): Half-moon jottings, 2 collections
- 郭 风: 《郭风散文选集》 Guo Feng: Selected Essays of Guo Feng
- 艾 煊: 《烟水江南绿》 Ai Xuan (writer): Smoke and water, Jiangnan green

National Outstanding Prose Award, 1995—1996

- 何 为: 《何为散文选集》 He Wei: Collected Essays of He Wei
- 王充闾: 《春宽梦窄》 Wang Chonglu: Spring is wide, dream is narrow
- 周 涛: 《中华散文珍藏本•周涛卷》 Zhou Tao (writer): Chinese prose collection: Zhou Tao vol.
- 铁 凝: 《女人的白夜》 Tie Ning: Woman's white night
- 李 辉: 《秋白茫茫》 Li Hui (writer): Autumn white so vast
- 周同宾: 《皇天后土》 Zhou Tongbin:
- 赵 玫: 《从这里到永恒》 Zhao Mei: From here to eternity
- 刘成章: 《羊想云彩》 Liu Chengzhang: Sheep Imagining Clouds
- 夏坚勇: 《湮没的辉煌》 Xia Xianyong: Brilliance annihilated
- 斯 妤: 《两种生活》 Si Yu: Two Kinds of Life

National Excellent Misc. Writing Award, 1995—1996

- 林祖基: 《微言集》 Lin Zuji: Micro-writing
- 何满子: 《何满子杂文自选集》 He Manzi: Selected Works of He Manzi
- 邵燕祥: 《邵燕祥随笔》 Shao Yanxiang: Essays
- 韩 羽: 《韩羽杂文自选集》 Han Yu (writer): Miscellaneous Writings
- 唐达成: 《世象杂拾》 Tang Dacheng:

National Excellent Theoretical Review Award, 1995—1996

- 樊 骏: 《认识老舍》 Fan Jun: Knowing Lao She
- 敏 泽: 《社会主义市场经济与文学价值论》 Min Ze: On Socialist Market Economy and Literary Value
- 陈伯海: 《自传统至现代——近四百年中国文学思潮变迁论》 Chen Bohai: From Tradition to Today – on the evolution of trends in Chinese literary thought over the last 400 years
- 曾镇南: 《论鲁迅与林语堂的幽默观》 Zeng Zhennan: On Lu Xun's and Lin Yutang's views on humour
- 邵伯周: 《茅盾几部重要作品的评价问题》 Shao Bozhou: Problems in evaluating some of Mao Dun's important works

National Excellent Literary Translation Award, 1995—1996

- （jury recommendations）陈占元, 金克木, 黄 源, 刘辽逸, 吕叔湘, 施蛰存, 孙绳武, 伍孟昌, 朱维之, 陈冰夷, 齐 香, 方 平, 金 隄,蒋 路, 磊 然, 李 芒, 钱春绮, 孙家晋, 唐 笙, 辛未艾, 袁可嘉, 叶水夫, 郑永慧, 草 婴, 任溶溶

National Excellent Literary Translation Rainbow Award, 1995—1996

- 杨德豫 译: 《华兹华斯抒情诗选》Yang Deyu (tr) Anthology of Wordsworth's Lyrics
- 燕汉生 译: 《艾青诗百首》 Yan Hansheng (tr): Ai Qing 100 Poems
- 绿 原 译: 《浮士德》 Lu Yuan (tr): Faust
- 范维信 译: 《修道院纪事》 Fan Weixin (tr): Abbey Chronicle
- 顾蕴璞 译: 《莱蒙托夫全集2•抒情诗II》 Gu Yunpu (tr): Complete works of Lemontov 2: Lyrics II

== 2nd Awards (2000) ==
The following translated titles are approximate.

=== National Excellent Short Story Award, 1997－2000 ===
- Liu Qingbang: Shoes (Chinese: 刘庆邦:《鞋》)
- Shi Shuqing: Knife in Fresh Water (Chinese: 石舒清:《清水里的刀子》)
- Hong Ke: Bragging (Chinese: 红 柯:《吹牛》)
- Xu Kun: Kitchen (Chinese: 徐 坤:《厨房》)
- Che Zijian: Washing off Dust in Fresh Water Chinese: 迟子建:《清水洗尘》)

=== National Excellent Novella Award, 1997－2000 ===
- Ye Guangqin: Xie Bridge (Chinese: 叶广芩:《梦也何曾到谢桥》)
- Guizi: Rain-drenched River (Chinese: 鬼 子:《被雨淋湿的河》)
- Tie Ning: How Far is Forever Chinese: 铁 凝:《永远有多远》)
- Yi Xiangdong: Wind in the Valley (Chinese: 衣向东:《吹满风的山谷》)
- Yan Lianke: Year Month Day (Chinese: 阎连科:《年月日》)

=== National Excellent Reportage Award 1997－2000 ===
- He Jianming: Tears are Gold (Chinese: 何建明:《落泪是金》)
- Wang Shuzeng: Far East Korean War (Chinese: 王树增:《远东朝鲜战争》)
- Mei Jie: Westside Discussion (Chinese: 梅 洁:《西部的倾诉》)
- Li Mingsheng: China 863 (Chinese: 李鸣生:《中国863)
- Wang Liguang: Line between Life and Death (Chinese: 杨黎光:《生死一线》)

=== National Outstanding Poetry Award 1997－2000 ===
- Yang Xiaomin: Shy (Chinese: 杨晓民:《羞涩》)
- Qu Youyuan: Selection of Vernacular Poems (Chinese: 曲有源:《曲有源白话诗选》)
- Zhu Zengquan: The Earth is a Teary Eye (Chinese: 朱增泉:《地球是一只泪眼》)
- Xi Chuan: Poems of Sichuan (Chinese: 西 川:《西川的诗》)
- Cao Yuxuan: Pure Sunshine (Chinese: 曹宇翔:《纯粹阳光》)

=== National Excellent Prose Essay Prize 1997－2000 ===
- Li Guowen: Daya Village Words (Chinese: 李国文:《大雅村言》)
- Yu Qiuyu: Notes on Living in the Mountains (Chinese: 余秋雨:《山居笔记》)
- Zhu Tiezhi: Spirit Returned (Chinese: 朱铁志:《精神的归宿》)
- Yu Guangyao: Last Night's West Wind Battered the Green Tree (Chinese: 徐光耀:《昨夜西风凋碧树》)
- Zhang Kangkang: Essays (Chinese: 张抗抗:《张抗抗散文》)

=== National Outstanding Literary Review Award 1997－2000 ===
- Chen Yong: Re-evaluation of the May 4th Culture Revolution (Chinese: 陈 涌:《"五四"文化革命的再评价》)
- Cheng Wenchao: 1903: overnight surge (Chinese: 程文超:《一九O三：前夜的涌动》)
- He Xiangyang: 12 children of 1998 (Chinese: 何向阳:《12个：1998年的孩子》)
- Han Ziyong: Literary writing of the Remote Western Provinces (Chinese: 韩子勇:《西部：偏远省份的文学写作》)
- Qian Zhongwen: Contemporary Questions in Literary Theory (Chinese: 钱中文:《文学理论现代性问题》)

=== National Outstanding Literary Translation Award 1995－1998 ===
- Tu An – Anthology of Keats Poetry' (Chinese: 屠 岸 译:《济慈诗选》)
- Dong Yansheng – Don Quixote (Chinese: 董燕生 译:《堂吉诃德》)
- Wang Huansheng – The Odyssey (Chinese: 王焕生 译:《奥德赛》)
- Dong Chun – Yangge (Chinese: 董 纯 译:《秧歌》)
- Tao Jie – Temple (Chinese: 陶 洁 译:《圣殿》)

== 3rd Awards (2001-2003) ==
The following translated titles are approximate.
National Excellent Novella Award, 2001-2003

- 毕飞宇: 《玉米》 Bi Feiyu: Corn
- 陈应松: 《松鸦为什么鸣叫》 Chen Yingsong: Why the jay crows
- 夏天敏: 《好大一对羊》 Xia Tianmin: An enormous pair of sheep
- 孙惠芬: 《歇马山庄的两个女人》 Sun Huifen: The Two Women of Xiema Village

National Excellent Short Story Award, 2001-2003

- 王祥夫: 《上边》 Wang Xiangfu: Above
- 温亚军: 《驮水的日子》 Wen Yajun: Carrying Water Days
- 魏 微: 《大老郑的女人》 Wei Wei: Big Lao Zheng's Woman
- 王安忆: 《发廊情话》 Wang Anyi: Confidences in a Hair Salon

National Excellent Reportage Award, 2001-2003

- 王光明 and 姜良纲: 《中国有座鲁西监狱》 Wang Guangming and Jiang Lianggang: In China there's Luxi Prison
- 李春雷: 《宝山》 Li Chunlei: Baoshan
- 杨黎光: 《瘟疫，人类的影子"非典"溯源》 Yang Liguang: Plague, shadow of mankind, tracing back SARS
- 加央西热（藏）: 《西藏最后的驮队》 Jia-yang-xi-ri (Tibetan): The last pack team in Tibet
- 赵瑜、胡世全: 《革命百里洲》 Zhao Yu and Hu Shiquan: Revolution Bailizhou

National Excellent Poetry Award, 2001-2003

- 老乡: 《野诗全集》 Lao xiang: Wild Poems, Complete Works
- 郁葱: 《郁葱抒情诗》 Yu Cong: Yu Cong poems
- 马新朝: 《幻河》 Ma Xinchao: Magic River
- 成幼殊: 《幸存的一粟》 Cheng Youshu:
- 娜夜（满、女）: 《娜夜诗选》 Na Ye: Selection of Na Ye's poetry

National Excellent Essay Prose Award, 2001-2003

- 贾平凹: 《贾平凹长篇散文精选》 Jia Pingwa: The best of Jia Pingwa's long essays
- 李存葆: 《大河遗梦》 Li Xubao: Dreams on a big river
- 史铁生: 《病隙碎笔》 Shi Tiesheng: Break in Illness
- 素素: 《独语东北》 Su Su: Alone, talking of the northeast
- 鄢烈山: 《一个人的经典》 Yan Lingshan: One person's classic

National Excellent Theoretical Review Award, 2001-2003

- 吴义勤: 《难度•长度•速度•限度——关于长篇小说文体问题的思考》 Wu Yiqin: Difficulty, Length, Speed, Limitations - reflections on the issue of style in novels
- 王向峰: 《〈手稿〉的美学解读》 Wang Xiangfeng: Aesthetic interpretation of "manuscript"
- 陈超: 《打开诗的漂流瓶——现代诗研究论集》 Chen Chao: Letting the poem out of the bottle: research on modern poetry
- 朱向前: 《朱向前文学理论批评选》 Zhu Xiangqian: Selection of Literary Criticism by Zhu Xiangqian

National Excellent Literary Translation Award, 2001-2003

- 田德望 译: 《神曲》（但丁•著•意大利文） Tian Dewang (tr): Divine Comedy, by Dante
- 黄燎宇 译: 《雷曼先生》（斯文•雷根纳•著•德文）Huang Liaoyu (tr): Herr Lehman, by Sven Regena

== 4th Awards (2004-2006) ==
The following translated titles are approximate.
National Excellent Novella Award, 2004-2006

- 蒋韵: 《心爱的树》 Jiang Yun: Beloved Tree
- 田耳: 《一个人张灯结彩》 Tian Er: Title
- 葛水平: 《喊山》 Ge Shuiping: Title
- 迟子建: 《世界上所有的夜晚》 Chi Zijian: All the nights in the world
- 晓航: 《师兄的透镜》 Xiao Hang: Brothers In the Mirror

National Excellent Short Story Award, 2004-2006

- 范小青: 《城乡简史》 Fan Xiaoqing: Short history of town and country
- 郭文斌: 《吉祥如意》 Guo Wenbin: General's Army
- 邵丽: 《明惠的圣诞》 Shao Li: Minghui's Christmas

National Excellent Reportage Award, 2004-2006

- 朱晓军: 《天使在作战》 Zhu Xiaojun: Angel in combat
- 何建明: 《部长与国家》 He Jianming: Minister and State
- 党益民: 《用胸膛行走西藏》 Dang Yimin: Walking in Tibet
- 王宏甲: 《中国新教育风暴》 Wang Hongjia: China's new educational storm
- 王树增: 《长征》 Wang Shuzeng: Long March

National Excellent Poetry Award, 2004-2006

- 田禾: 《喊故乡》 Tian He: Calling home
- 荣荣: 《看见》 Rong Rong: See
- 黄亚洲: 《行吟长征路》 Huang Yazhou: Long March
- 林雪: 《大地葵花》 Lin Xue: World of Sunflowers
- 于坚: 《只有大海苍茫如幕》 Yu Jian: Only the sea as vast as the screen

National Excellent Essay Prose Award, 2004-2006

- 韩少功: 《山南水北》 Han Shaogong: South of the mountains, north of the river
- 南帆: 《辛亥年的枪声》 Nan Fan: Gunfire in the Xinhai Year
- 刘家科: 《乡村记忆》 Liu Jiake: Village Memory
- 裘山山: 《遥远的天堂》 Qiu Shanshan: Remote Paradise

National Excellent Theoretical Review Award, 2004-2006

- 李敬泽: 《见证一千零一夜——21世纪初的文学生活》 Li Jingze: Witness the Thousand and One Nights – Literary life in the 21st century
- 陈晓明: 《无边的挑战——中国先锋文学的后现代性》 Chen Xiaoming: Boundless challenge: Postmodernity of Chinese Avant-garde literature
- 欧阳友权: 《数字化语境中的文艺学》 Ouyang Youquan: Literature and Art in the digital context
- 雷达: 《当前文学创作症候分析》 Lei Da: Analysis of Symptoms of the current literature creation
- 洪治纲: 《困顿中的挣扎——贾平凹论》 Hong Zhigang: Struggling in the difficulties – on Jia Pingwa

National Excellent Literary Translation Award, 2004-2006

- 许金龙译: 《别了，我的书》（大江健三郎•著•日文） Xu Jinlong (tr): [title], by Kenzaburo Oe
- 王东亮译: 《笑忘录》（米兰•昆德拉•著•法文） Wang Dongliang (tr): Book of Laughter and Forgetting, by Milan Kundera
- 李之义译: 《斯特林堡文集》（五卷）（斯特林堡•著•瑞典文）Li Zhiyi (tr), The Works of August Strindberg, 5 vols

== 5th Awards (2007-2009) ==
National Excellent Novella Award, 2007-2009

- 乔叶：《最慢的是活着》 Qiao Ye: The Slowest Thing is to be Alive
- 王十月：《国家订单》 Wang Shiyue: Indent of Nation
- 吴克敬：《手铐上的蓝花花》 Wu Kejing: Blue Flowers on Handcuffs
- 李骏虎：《前面就是麦季》 Li Junhu: The Front is Wheat Season
- 方方：《琴断口》 Fang Fang: Qin Duankou

National Excellent Short Story Award, 2007-2009

- 鲁敏：《伴宴》 Lu Min: Feast of Companion
- 盛琼：《老弟的盛宴》 Sheng Qiong: Feast of Younger Brother
- 次仁罗布：《放生羊》 CiRen Luobu: Set Loose of the Sheep
- 苏童：《茨菰》 Su Tong: Arrowhead
- 陆颖墨：《海军往事》 Lu Yingmo: Old Memories in Navy

National Excellent Reportage Award, 2007-2009

- 李鸣生：《震中在人心》 Li Mingsheng: The Minds in Earthquake
- 张雅文：《生命的呐喊》 Zhang Yawen: Shout for Life
- 关仁山：《感天动地——从唐山到汶川》 Guan Renshan: Moving the World—From Tang Shan to Wen Chuan
- 彭荆风：《解放大西南》 Peng Jingfeng: Free the Grand South-West
- 李洁非：《胡风案中人与事》 Li Jiefei: Humanity and Affairs in Case of Hu Feng

National Excellent Poetry Award, 2007-2009

- 刘立云：《烤蓝》 Liu Liyun: Bluing
- 车延高：《向往温暖》 Che Yangao: Yearn for Warmth
- 李琦：《李琦近作选》 Li Qi: Collection of Current Works of Li Qi
- 傅天琳：《柠檬叶子》 Fu Tianlin: Leaves of Lemon
- 雷平阳：《云南记》 Lei Pingyang: Story of Yun Nan

National Excellent Essay Prose Award, 2007-2009

- 王宗仁：《藏地兵书》 Wang Zongren: War Book of Tibet Region
- 熊育群：《路上的祖先》 Xiong Yuqun: Ancestors on the Road
- 郑彦英：《风行水上》 Zheng Yanying: Wind Blows on the Water
- 王干：《王干随笔选》 Wang Gan: Collection of Jottings by Wang Gan
- 陆春祥：《病了的字母》 Lu Chunxiang: Sick Letter

National Excellent Theoretical Review Award, 2007-2009

- 南帆：《五种形象》 Nan Fan: Five Categories of Image
- 张炯：《马克思主义文艺理论及其面临的挑战》 Zhang Jiong: Marxist Theory of Literature and Art and the Challenges It Faces
- 赵园：《想象与叙述》 Zhao Yuan: Imagination and Narration
- 高楠 王纯菲：《中国文学跨世纪发展研究》 Gao Nan & Wang Chunfei: Study on Trans-century Development of Chinese Literature
- 谭旭东：《童年再现与儿童文学重构：电子媒介时代的童年与儿童文学》 Tan Xudong: Reproduction of Childhood and Reconstruction of Children's Literature: Childhood and Children's Literature in the Age of Electronic Media

National Excellent Literary Translation Award, 2007-2009

Lack of Data

== 6th Awards (2010-2013) ==
The following translated titles are approximate.
National Excellent Novella Award, 2010-2013

- 格非: 《隐身衣》 Ge Fei: Invisibility Cloak
- 滕肖澜: 《美丽的日子》 Teng Xiaolan: Beautiful Day
- 吕新: 《白杨木的春天》Lv Xin: Poplar Spring
- 胡学文: 《从正午开始的黄昏》 Hu Xuewen: Dusk from Noon
- 王跃文: 《漫水》 Wang Yuewen: Spreading Water

National Excellent Short Story Award, 2010-2013

- 马晓丽: 《俄罗斯陆军腰带》 Ma Xiaoli: My Russian Army Belt
- 叶舟: 《我的帐篷里有平安》 Ye Zhou: Peace in My Tent
- 叶弥: 《香炉山》 Ye Mi: Incense Burner Mountain
- 张楚: 《良宵》 Zhang Chu (author): Good Night
- 徐则臣: 《如果大雪封门》 Xu Zechen: If Snow Blocks the Door

National Excellent Reportage Award, 2010-2013

- 黄传会: 《中国新生代农民工》 Huang Chuanhui: China's New Generation of Migrant Workers
- 任林举: 《粮道》Ren Linju: Food Road
- 肖亦农: 《毛乌素绿色传奇》 Xiao Yinong: Tales of the Desert
- 铁流、徐锦庚: 《中国民办教育调查》 Tie Liu and Xu Jingeng: Survey of Private Education in China
- 徐怀中: 《底色》 Xu Huaizhong: Background

National Excellent Poetry Award, 2010-2013

- 阎安: 《整理石头》 Yan An (author): Ordering Stones
- 大解: 《个人史》 Da Jie: Personal History
- 海男: 《忧伤的黑麋鹿》 Hai Nan: Sad Black Elk
- 周啸天: 《将进茶——周啸天诗词选》 Zhou Xiaotian: Bring in the Tea - Poetry Selection
- 李元胜: 《无限事》 Li Yuansheng: Infinite Things

National Excellent Essay Prose Award, 2010-2013

- 刘亮程: 《在新疆》 Liu Liangcheng: In Xinjiang
- 贺捷生: 《父亲的雪山 母亲的草地》 He Jiesheng: Father's Snow Mountains, Mother's Grasslands
- 穆涛: 《先前的风气》 Mu Tao: Earlier Culture
- 周晓枫: 《巨鲸歌唱》 Zhou Xiaofeng: The Huge Whale Song
- 侯健飞: 《回鹿山》 Hou Jianfei: Return to Deer Mountain

National Excellent Theoretical Review Award, 2010-2013

- 孟繁华: 《文学革命终结之后——新世纪文学论稿》 Meng Fanghua: After the End of Literary Revolution - New Century Literary Theory
- 鲁枢元: 《陶渊明的幽灵》 Lu Shuyuan: The Spirit of Tao Yuanming
- 程德培: 《谁也管不住说话这张嘴》 Cheng Depei: No one Can Stop This Mouth From Talking
- 张新颖: 《中国当代文学中沈从文传统的回响 ——〈活着〉、〈秦腔〉、〈天香〉和这个传统 的不同部分的对话》 Zhang Xinying: The reverberations of Shen Congwen's tradition in Chinese contemporary literature
- 贺绍俊 《建设性姿态下的精神重建》 He Shaojun: Spiritual Reconstruction under a Constructive Attitude

National Excellent Literary Translation Award, 2010-2013

- 赵振江: 《人民的风》 Zhao Zhenjiang: Wind of the People
- 刘方: 《布罗岱克的报告》 Liu Fang (author): Brodyck's Report
- 王家湘: 《有色人民——回忆录》 Wang Jiaxiang: Interesting People - Memoirs
- 韩瑞祥: 《上海，远在何方？》 Han Ruixiang: Shanghai, how far?

== 7th Awards (2014-2017) ==
National Excellent Novella Award, 2014-2017

- 石一枫:《世间已无陈金芳》 Shi Yifeng: No Chen Jinfang in the World阿来:《蘑菇圈》 Alai
- 尹学芸:《李海叔叔》Yin Xueyun: Uncle Li Hai小白:《封锁》 Xiao Bai
- 阿来:《蘑菇圈》 Alai: Fairy Ring
- 肖江虹:《傩面》 Xiao Jianghong: The Mask of Nuo
- 小白:《封锁》 Xiao Bai: Lockdown

National Excellent Short Story Award, 2014-2017

- 黄咏梅:《父亲的后视镜》 Huang Yongmei: Father's Rearview Mirror
- 马金莲:《1987年的浆水和酸菜》 Ma Jinlian: Mixed Starch and Chinese Sauerkraut in 1987
- 冯骥才:《俗世奇人》Feng Jicai: Miraculous One in Earthliness
- 弋舟: 《出警》 Yi Zhou: Police On Operation
- 朱辉 :《七层宝塔》Zhu Hui: Seven Layered Pagoda

National Excellent Reportage Award, 2014-2017

- 李春雷:《朋友：习近平与贾大山交往纪事》Li Chunlei: Friendship: Intercourse Report between Xi Jinping and Jia Dashan
- 丰收:《西长城》 Feng Shou: West of the Great Wall
- 许晨:《第四极：中国"蛟龙"号挑战深海》 Xu Chen: Jiaolong Submersible's Challenge to the Deep Sea
- 徐刚:《大森林》 Xu Gang: Grand Forrest
- 纪红建:《乡村国是》Ji Hongjian: National Affairs in the Countryside

National Excellent Poetry Award, 2014-2017

- 汤养宗:《去人间》Tang Yangzong: To the Human World
- 杜涯:《落日与朝霞》 Du Ya: Sunset Glow and Morning Glow
- 胡弦:《沙漏》Hu Xian: Sand Clock
- 陈先发:《九章》 Chen Xianfa: Nine Chapters
- 张执浩:《高原上的野花》 Zhang Zhihao: Wildflower on the Highland

National Excellent Essay Prose Award, 2014-2017

- 李修文:《山河袈裟》 Li Xiuwen: Cassock of the Mountains and Rivers
- 宁肯:《北京：城与年》Ning Ken: Beijing: the City and the Age
- 李娟:《遥远的向日葵地》 Li Juan: Distant Field of Sunflowers
- 鲍尔吉·原野:《流水似的走马》Bao'erji Yuanye: Gallop Like Running Water
- 夏立君:《时间的压力》 Xia Lijun: The Pressure of Time

National Excellent Theoretical Review Award, 2014-2017

- 黄发有:《中国当代文学传媒研究》 Huang Fayou: Media Study of Chinese Contemporary Literature
- 陈思和:《有关20世纪中国文学史研究的几个问题》 Chen Sihe: Chen Sihe: A Few Questions about Research of Chinese Literary History in 20th Century
- 刘大先:《必须保卫历史》Liu Daxian: Essentiality to Protect the History
- 王尧:《重读汪曾祺兼论当代文学相关问题》Wang Yao: Reread Wang Zengqi and Discuss Related Problems of Contemporary Literature
- 白烨:《文坛新观察》 Bai Hua: New Observation of the Literary Circles

National Excellent Literary Translation Award, 2014-2017

- Lu Yanping 路燕萍 - translation of Eduardo Galeano's Memoria del Fuego - Genesis《火的记忆I：创世纪》
- Yu Zhongxian 余中先 - translation of Christophe Ono-Dit-Biot's Plonger《潜》
- Li Yongyi 李永毅 - translation of Horace's Odes《贺拉斯诗全集》
- Wang Jun - translation of Ludovico Ariosto's Orlando Furioso 《疯狂的罗兰》

== 8th Awards (2018-2021) ==
National Excellent Novella Award, 2018-2021

- 王松 :《红骆驼》 Wang Song: Red Camel
- 王凯：《荒野步枪手》Wang Kai: Rifleman at Wilderness
- 艾伟：《过往》Ai Wei: The Past
- 索南才让：《荒原上》Suo-nan-cai-rang: On the Wasteland
- 葛亮：《飞发》Ge Liang: Fly Hair

National Excellent Short Story Award, 2018-2021

- 刘建东 :《无法完成的画像》 Liu Jiandong: Portrait that Couldn't be Completed
- 张者：《山前该有一棵树》 Zhang Zhe: There Should be a Tree in front of the Mountain
- 钟求是：《地上的天空》 Zhong Qiushi: Sky on the Ground
- 董夏青青：《在阿吾斯奇》 Dong Xia Qingqing: At the Place with Fill of Little Yellow Flowers
- 蔡东：《月光下》 Cai Dong: Under the Moonlight

National Excellent Reportage Award, 2018-2021

- 丁晓平：《红船启航》 Ding Xiaoping: Set Sailing of the Red Ship
- 欧阳黔森：《江山如此多娇》 Ouyang Qiansen: Our Land is Rich in Beauty
- 钟法权：《张富清传》 Zhong Faquan: Biography of Zhang Fuqing
- 龚盛辉：《中国北斗》 Gong Shenghui: Big Dipper in China
- 蒋巍：《国家温度》 Jiang Wei: The Temperature of A Nation

National Excellent Poetry Award, 2018-2021

- 刘笑伟：《岁月青铜》 Liu Xiaowei: Bronze of Times
- 陈人杰：《山海间》 Chen Renjie: In-between the Mountain and Sea
- 韩东：《奇迹》 Han Dong: Miracle
- 路也：《天空下》 Lu Ye: Under the Sky
- 臧棣：《诗歌植物学》 Zang Di: Phytology of Poetry

National Excellent Essay Prose Award, 2018-2021

- 江子：《回乡记》 Jiang Zi: The Story of Returning Hometown
- 李舫：《大春秋》 Li Fang: The Grand Spring and Autumn
- 沈念：《大湖消息》 Shen Nian: Message of the Grand Lake
- 陈仓：《月光不是光》 Chen Cang: The Moonlight is Not A Light
- 庞余亮：《小先生》 Pang Yuliang: The Little Mister

National Excellent Theoretical Review Award, 2018-2021

- 杨庆祥：《新时代文学写作景观》 Yang Qingxiang: Scenery of Literary Writing in New Era
- 何平：《批评的返场》 He Ping: The Return of Criticism
- 张莉：《小说风景》 Zhang Li: The View of Novel
- 张学昕：《中国当代小说八论》 Zhang Xuexin: Eight Theories of Contemporary Chinese Novels
- 郜元宝：《编年史和全景图——细读<平凡的世界>》 Gao Yuanbao: Chronicle and Panorama – Perusal of "The Ordinary World"

National Excellent Literary Translation Award, 2018-2021

- Xu Xiaofan 许小凡 – translation of Lyndall Gordon's The Imperfect Life of T. S. Eliot 《T.S.艾略特传：不完美的一生》
- Yang Tiejun 杨铁军 – translation of Derek Walcott's Omeros 《奥麦罗斯》
- Chen Fang 陈方 – translation of Guzel Yakhina's Wolgakinder 《我的孩子们》
- Zhu Zuci 竺祖慈 – translation of Fujisawa Shūhei's shōsetsuno shūhen 《小说周边》
- Xue Qingguo 薛庆国 – translation of Adunis's Index of the Acts of the Wind《风的作品之目录》
