= People's Literature Publishing House =

Chinese publisher

Coordinates: 39°55′49″N 116°25′55″E

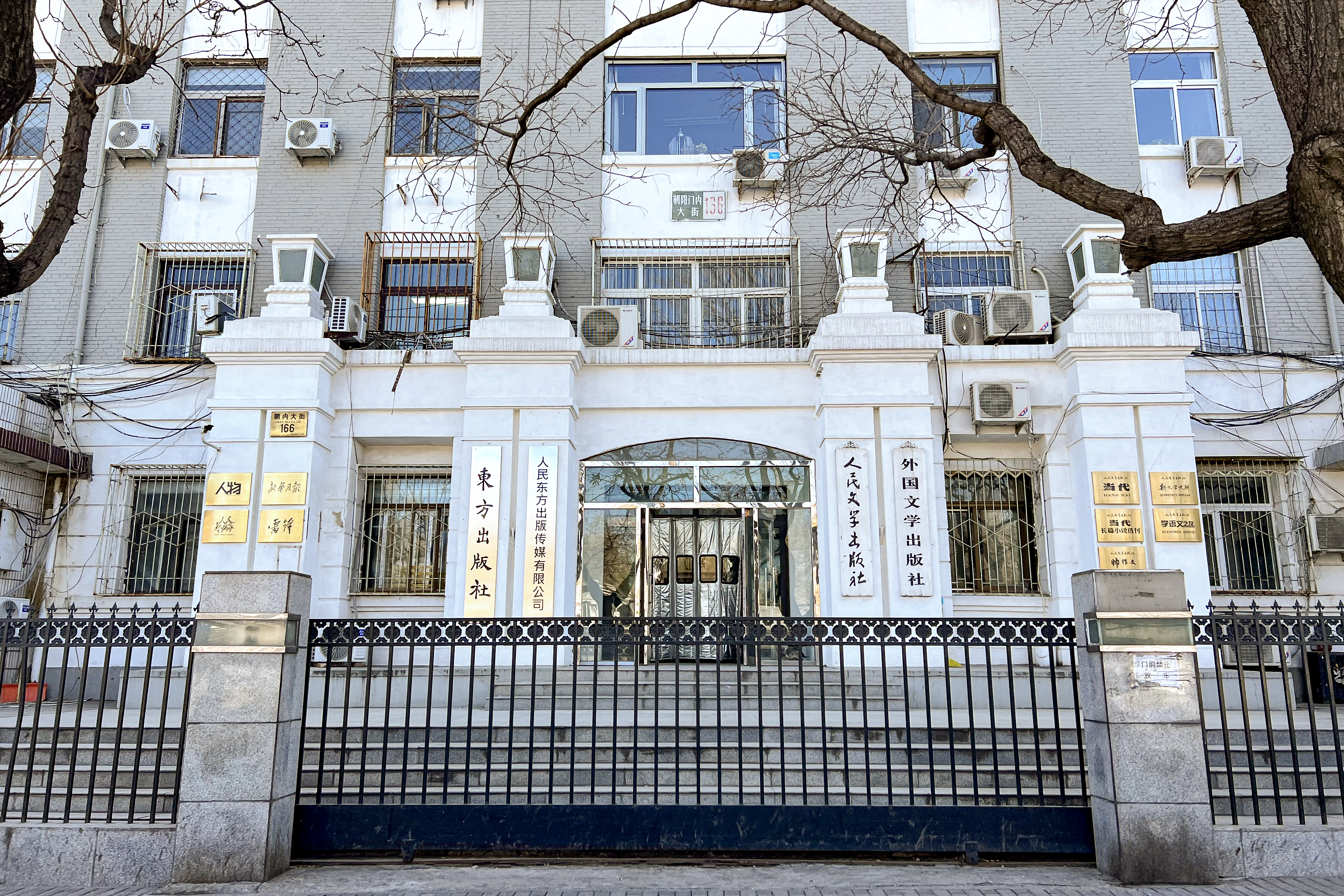
- Parent company: Chinese Publishing Group
- Founded: March 1951
- Founder: Ministry of Culture of the People's Republic of China
- Country of origin: China
- Headquarters location: Chaoyangmen 116, Beijing
- Key people: Pan Kaixiong (director); Guan Shiguang (editor-in-chief)
- Publication types: Academic publishing
- Official website: www.rw-cn.com

The People's Literature Publishing House (simplified Chinese: 人民文学出版社; traditional Chinese: 人民文學出版社; pinyin: Rénmín Wénxué Chūbǎnshè) is a large-scale publishing house in China. It was established in March 1951, and was attached to the China Publishing Group. It is known for scholarly publications, editions of classical Chinese literature, and dictionaries. Its head office is at Chaoyangmen 116, Beijing. Its current director is Zang Yongqing (臧永清) and the editor-in-chief is Li Hongqiang (李红强).

== Leaders ==
- Director: Zang Yongqing (臧永清)
- Deputy director: Liu Guohui (刘国辉) and Liu Xianwen (刘献文)
- Editor-in-chief: Li Hongqiang (李红强)
- Deputy editor-in-chief: Xiao Yuanyuan (肖丽媛) and Cao Jian (曹剑)

== See also ==
- Publishing industry in China
