= Selected works =

Selected works may refer to:

== Books ==
- Anthology, a collection of literary works
- Selected Works of Deng Xiaoping, a 1983 book collection
- Selected Works of Hu Jintao, a 2016 article collection
- Selected Works of Jiang Zemin, a 2006 article collection
- Selected Works of Mao Tse-Tung, a 1960 book collection
- The Selected Works of T. S. Spivet, a 2009 novel Reif Larsen

== Music ==
- Selected Works: 1972–1999, a 2000 box set by Eagles
- Selected Ambient Works 85–92, a 1992 album by Aphex Twin
