= Selected Works of Deng Xiaoping =

Series of books written by Deng Xiaoping

- Cover for Volume 1
- Editors: Document Editing Committee of the CCP Central Committee
- Author: Deng Xiaoping
- Original title: 邓小平文选
- Language: Mandarin Chinese, English, Spanish, French, Russian, Arabic, and Japanese
- Genre: Politics
- Publisher: People's Publishing House
- Publication date: 1983, 1989, 1993, 1994
- Publication place: Mainland China
- Media type: Print (Hardcover, Paperback)
- Pages: 384 (V.I), 446 (V.II), 418 (V.III)
- ISBN: 978-7-01-000539-3 (Vol. I)

Selected Works of Deng Xiaoping
- Simplified Chinese: 邓小平文选
- Traditional Chinese: 鄧小平文選
Transcriptions
Standard Mandarin
- Hanyu Pinyin: Dèng Xiǎopíng Wénxuǎn

Abbreviation
- Simplified Chinese: 邓选
- Traditional Chinese: 鄧選
Transcriptions
Standard Mandarin
- Hanyu Pinyin: Dèngxuǎn

The Selected Works of Deng Xiaoping (Chinese: 邓小平文选) is a collection of writings by Deng Xiaoping, the paramount leader of China from 1978 to 1989. It includes his speeches, articles, and transcripts of conversations. It is published by the People's Publishing House, with the PLA Publishing House also authorized to reprint a portion of it. Currently, it is divided into three volumes: Volume 1 (1938–1965), Volume 2 (1975–1982), and Volume 3 (1982–1992).

== History ==
The Selected Works of Deng Xiaoping was drafted in 1983, with the contribution of Hu Qiaomu. It was published in July 1983. On 13 July 1983, Hu delivered an internal speech celebrating its publication.

== Overview ==
=== Chinese version ===
- In July 1983, the Selected Works of Deng Xiaoping (1975–1982) was published, which included Deng Xiaoping's important works from 1975 to September 1982, totaling 47 speeches and talks. Deng Xiaoping reviewed all the manuscripts one by one when editing the book.
- In May 1989, the Selected Works of Deng Xiaoping (1938–1965) was published, which included Deng Xiaoping's important works from 1938 to 1965, totaling 39 speeches and talks. Deng Xiaoping reviewed all the manuscripts one by one when editing the book.
- In October 1993, Volume III of Selected Works of Deng Xiaoping (ISBN 7-01-001863-4) was published, which included Deng Xiaoping's important works from September 1982 to February 1992, totaling 119 speeches and talks. Deng Xiaoping reviewed all the manuscripts one by one during the editing of this book.
- In October 1994, with Deng Xiaoping's approval, the second edition of "Selected Works of Deng Xiaoping (1938-1965)" was published and renamed "Selected Works of Deng Xiaoping, Volume 1" (ISBN 7-01-002067-1), with four additional works added.
- In October 1994, with Deng Xiaoping's approval, the second edition of "Selected Works of Deng Xiaoping (1975-1982)" was published and renamed "Selected Works of Deng Xiaoping, Volume II" (ISBN 7-01-002070-1). Fourteen new works were added, and the "Opening Address of the Twelfth National Congress of the Communist Party of China" originally included in this volume was moved to "Selected Works of Deng Xiaoping, Volume III".

=== Foreign language translation ===
- In 1983, the Japanese version of "Selected Works of Deng Xiaoping" (1975-1982) was translated by the Compilation and Translation Bureau and published by Foreign Languages Press. English, Spanish, and Arabic versions were also published in 1985.
- In 1992, Foreign Languages Press published the English, Spanish and Japanese versions of Selected Works of Deng Xiaoping (1938-1965).
- In 1993, Foreign Languages Press selected nine articles from the third volume of the Chinese edition and translated them into English as Deng Xiaoping on the Question of Hong Kong.
- In August 1994, Foreign Languages Press published English, Spanish, Japanese, French and Russian versions of Volume III of Selected Works of Deng Xiaoping.

== See also ==
- Selected Works of Mao Tse-Tung
- Selected Works of Jiang Zemin
- Selected Works of Hu Jintao
- The Governance of China
