= Publishing industry in China =

Publishing and printing in mainland China have a long history. The first printed book sold commercially was sold in the markets of the Tang dynasty in 762, while printed paper receipts used for business transactions and tax payments can be dated to 782. The publishing industry in the People's Republic of China continues to grow in modern times. In 2004, China published 25.77 billion copies of national-level and provincial-level newspapers, 2.69 billion magazines, and 6.44 billion books.

== History ==
=== Pre-modern ===
- ~250 BCE - Writing on silk begins; previously writing on bamboo was the usual method.
- ~150 BCE - Hemp papermaking begins.
- 868 CE - Block-printed Buddhist Diamond Sutra published.
- 1041 CE - Book printing from moveable type begins.

The first use of the term "printing" in the Chinese context appeared in Shen Kuo's Dream Pool Essays during the Northern Song Dynasty (960-1127 CE). It referred to woodblock printing. To distinguish it from later developing printing technology, the terminology for woodblock "printing" later became "block printing". Chinese woodblock printing as a UNESCO Intangible Cultural Heritage of Humanity in 2009.

In ancient China, publishing entities were generally referred to as "book shops" or "book stalls".

=== Modernity ===
In the middle 19th century, mechanical printing entered China, beginning a period where it was in use at the same time as methods like woodblock printing, lead printing, and lithography.

Movable type printing quickly expanded in use during the late 19th century.

The term "publishing," which did not exist in classical Chinese, came into use during the late Qing dynasty.

After the founding of the Chinese Communist Party (CCP) in 1921, the party placed increased emphasis on distributed Marxist doctrine. This prompted the creation of People's Publishing House for the dissemination of communists texts and subsequently printing and publishing enterprises in revolutionary base areas and other CCP-controlled areas.

The Chinese Civil War resulted in communist printing generally operating covertly and raw materials were often difficult to acquire. As a result, CCP printing practices incorporated inexpensive and outdated methods and materials and techniques, including engraving printing, wax paper mimeograph, and lithography.

In 1940, the Central Committee of the Chinese Communist Party issued its Instruction on Developing Cultural Movements, instructing that in "every large base area, a complete printing factory should be established. Existing printing factories should strive for improvement and expansion. The construction of a printing factory should be regarded as more important than building an army of ten thousand or even more. It's crucial to organize the distribution of newspapers, periodicals, and books, have specialized transport organizations and protective troops, and consider transporting cultural sustenance as important as transporting clothes and ammunition."

=== People's Republic of China ===
From the late 1950s to the 1970s, publishing was organized without profit motivation and on the basis of the state's interests.

"How-to" manuals on practical topics were popular by the Republican period, but publishing of such manuals expanded rapidly during the 1950s as part of the CCP's position that scientific knowledge should be widely spread and available to the people.

In 1964, Quotations from Chairman Mao Tse-tung (the Little Red Book) was first issued. During the 1960s, the book was the single most visible icon in China.

Western fictional works published for public audiences focused on literature deemed as addressing the miseries of capitalism, such as works by Charles Dickens, Victor Hugo, and Leo Tolstoy. A broader range of Western works were produced as "White Cover Books" for restricted internal publishing and were not available in bookstores. Beginning in 1976, publishers increasingly produced translated Western fiction, including both works deemed classic or artistically serious, as well as fiction for the popular market. Since the 1980s, the norm for popular fiction translating and publication in China is the use multiple translators in the interest of rapid publication.

After Deng Xiaoping's 1992 southern tour, the culture industry of China became increasingly commercialized. This resulted in major changes to Chinese publishing, including the comparative marginalization of highbrow literature. The commercial press also provided opportunities for intellectuals to write for an increasingly educated and affluent urban middle class. Although in some aspects entertainment was de-politicized, the market also demonstrated a demand for commentaries and political treatises on a broad range of political issues, especially foreign policy.

== Books and periodicals ==
The Chinese book industry is the second largest in the world, after the United States. Receipts in 2013 totaled $8 billion from 400,000 titles.

As of 2015, there were about 580 state-controlled publishing houses and 292 audio-video publishers in China. The state has also planned key book publication projects and established prizes for books, promoting the development of the publishing industry.

Publishers must have a license from the government in order to issue ISBNs. Publishing companies without this license can partner with publishing companies that do in order to obtain ISBNs for their books.

== Foreign-language publishing ==
The China International Publishing Group (CIPG, Chinese: 中国国际出版集团) undertakes the publication, printing and distribution of foreign-language books and periodicals, playing a unique role in publishing, cultural exchange and cooperation. It consists of four print magazines and several websites in many languages including English, French, Spanish, Arabic, Japanese, Esperanto and Chinese.

The four magazines are Beijing Review, China Today, China Pictorial, and People's China. It also has seven publishing houses, including Foreign Languages Press and New World Press, publishing nearly 1,000 titles annually, covering a wide range of subjects in more than 20 foreign languages. The books are distributed to some 190 countries and regions, presenting China to all countries and promoting cultural exchange. The China International Book Trading Corporation, a member of the CIPG, distributes foreign-language books and periodicals to 80-odd countries and regions, and holds exhibition of Chinese books abroad.

== Scientific publishing ==
Today in China, there are more than 8,000 academic journals, of which more than 4,600 can be considered scientific. About 1,400 cover health science (medicine and public health). In 2022, it was reported that China has become one of the top countries in the world in both scientific research output, and also for highly cited academic papers.

== See also ==
- Media of China
- Chinese literature
- Xinhua Bookstore
- Legal deposit: China
- China Printing Museum, Beijing
- Chinese Dictionary Museum, Shanxi

== Bibliography ==
- "People's Republic of China: Directory: Publishers". Europa World Year Book. Europa Publications. 2004. p. 1143+. ISBN 1857432533.
