= Israel Epstein =

Chinese journalist (1915–2005)

- 伊斯雷尔·爱泼斯坦
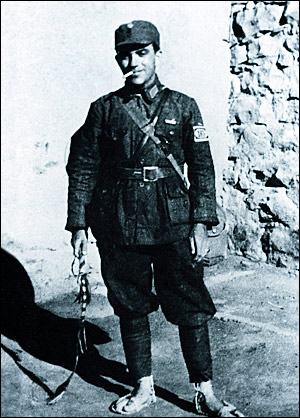
- Israel Epstein in 1944, Jin-Sui Border Region (northwestern Shanxi)

Member of the Standing Committee of the National Committee of the Chinese People's Political Consultative Conference
- In office June 1983 – 26 May 2005

Personal details
- Born: 20 April 1915 Warsaw, Congress Poland, Russian Empire (present-day Poland)
- Died: 26 May 2005 (aged 90) Beijing, China
- Resting place: Babaoshan Revolutionary Cemetery, Beijing
- Party: Chinese Communist Party
- Spouse: Edith Bihovsky (m. 1934; div. 1937) Elsie Fairfax-Cholmeley (m. 1944; died 1984) Huang Huanbi (m. 1984)
- Occupation: Journalist; politician

Chinese name
- Simplified Chinese: 伊斯雷尔·爱泼斯坦
- Traditional Chinese: 伊斯雷爾·愛潑斯坦
Transcriptions
Standard Mandarin
- Hanyu Pinyin: Yīsīléi'ěr Àipōsītǎn
- Wade–Giles: Īszūléi'ěrh Àip'ōszūt'ǎn
- Yale Romanization: Yīsz̄léi'ěr Àipwōsz̄tǎn
Yue: Cantonese
- Yale Romanization: yì sì euìh yíh ngoi put sì táan
- Jyutping: ji1 si1 eoi4 ji5 ngoi3 put3 si1 taan2

Nickname
- Chinese: 艾培
Transcriptions
Standard Mandarin
- Hanyu Pinyin: Àipéi

Israel Epstein (Note: simplified Chinese: 伊斯雷尔·爱泼斯坦; traditional Chinese: 伊斯雷爾·愛潑斯坦; pinyin: Yīsīléi'ěr Àipōsītǎn; Yiddish: ישראל עפּשטײן, romanized: Yisroel Epshteyn; Russian: Израэль Эпштейн, romanized: Izraél Epshteyn; Polish: Izrael Epsztajn.) (20 April 1915 – 26 May 2005), also known by his Chinese nickname "Aipei", (Note: Chinese: 艾培; pinyin: Àipéi.) was a Polish-born Chinese journalist who was one of the few foreign-born members of the Chinese Communist Party.

Born into a Polish family which fled to China after Epstein's birth, he covered the Japanese invasion of China for Allied news agencies and was later captured by Japanese forces. After the war, he became editor in chief of China Today.

== Early life and education ==
Israel Epstein was born on 20 April 1915 in Warsaw to Polish Jewish parents; Warsaw was then part of Congress Poland, which was under Imperial Russian control. His father had been imprisoned by the authorities of Tsarist Russia for leading a labor uprising and his mother had been exiled to Siberia. Epstein's father was sent by his company to Japan after the outbreak of World War I; when the German Army approached Warsaw, his mother and Epstein fled and joined him in Asia. With his family experiencing antisemitism in several places, Epstein came to China with his parents at the age of two and, in 1920, they settled in Tianjin, where Epstein was raised.

== Career ==
Israel Epstein began to work in journalism at age 15, when he wrote for the Peking and Tientsin Times, an English-language newspaper based in Tianjin. He also covered the Japanese Invasion of China for the United Press and other Western news agencies. In the autumn of 1938, he joined the China Defense League, which had been established by Soong Ching-ling, Sun Yat-sen's widow, for the purpose of publicizing and enlisting international support for the Chinese cause. In 1941, he faked news about his own death as a decoy for the Japanese who were trying to arrest him. The misinformation even found its way into a short item printed in The New York Times, according to his obituary.

After being assigned to review one of the books of Edgar Snow, Epstein and Snow came to know each other personally and Snow showed him his work Red Star Over China before it was published. He was deeply influenced by the progressivism of Snow and became involved with the democratic movement in China, becoming an editor for Snow's magazine, Democracy.

In 1934, he married Edith Bihovsky Epstein, from whom he later divorced because of the outbreak of the Second Sino-Japanese War in 1937, when his insistence on reporting from the front conflicted with her reluctance. She later remarried as Edith Ballin. In 1944, Epstein first visited Britain and went to live in the United States with his second wife Elsie Fairfax-Cholmeley for five years.

After escaping from an Imperial Japanese concentration camp, he worked for Allied Labor News, becoming editor-in-chief. He published his book The Unfinished Revolution in China in 1947. His book was reviewed in The New York Times by Owen Lattimore of Johns Hopkins University.

In 1951, Communist defector Elizabeth Bentley testified to the U.S. Senate Internal Security Subcommittee, "Israel Epstein had been a member of the Russian secret police for many years in China."

Many years later, his wife, Fairfax-Cholmeley, would become known to a generation of Chinese-language students in China and around the world as a contributor to one of the most widely used Chinese-English dictionaries published in the PRC. After Fairfax-Cholmeley's death in 1984, Epstein married his third wife, Huang Huanbi.

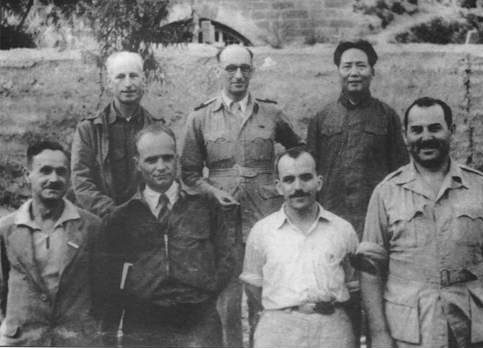
Epstein (front line, second right) visited Yan'an in 1944 with Mao (top right)

In 1951, Soong Ching-ling invited him to return to China with his wife Fairfax-Cholmeley. There, Epstein served as an advisor to People's China (Renmin Zhongguo), the forerunner of Peking Review. With Soong, he started the magazine China Reconstructs (Zhongguo Jianshe), which was later renamed China Today. Epstein also worked on the translation of the Selected Works of Mao Zedong (Mao Zedong Xuanji). He remained editor-in-chief of China Today until his retirement at age 70, and stayed on as editor emeritus. During his tenure at China Today, he became a Chinese citizen in 1957 and a member of the Chinese Communist Party in 1964. In 1955, 1965 and 1976 Epstein visited Tibet, and based on these three visits in 1983 published the book Tibet Transformed.

== Imprisonments ==
Epstein was placed in a concentration camp by Imperial Japanese authorities following the attack on Pearl Harbor in 1941. He escaped with other prisoners.

During the Cultural Revolution, on false charges of plotting against Zhou Enlai, he was imprisoned in 1968. In 1973, he was released, and Zhou apologized. His privileges were restored.

== Death and honors ==
During his life, Israel Epstein was honored by Chinese political leaders Zhou Enlai, Mao Zedong, Deng Xiaoping, Jiang Zemin, and Hu Jintao. In April 2005, Hu Jintao personally paid a visit to Epstein. Epstein died in Beijing on 26 May 2005. His funeral was held at the Babaoshan Cemetery for Revolutionaries, in Shijingshan District, Beijing on 3 June 2005.

== Published works ==
- The People's War. [An Account of the War in China to the Fall of Hankow], V. Gollancz, 1939, 384 p.
- I Visit Yenan: Eye Witness Account of the Communist-led Liberated Areas in North-West China, People's Publishing House [Bombay], 1945, 94 pp.
- Notes on Labor Problems in Nationalist China, Garland Pub., 1980, 159 pp.
- My China Eye: Memoirs of a Jew and a Journalist, Long River Press, 2005, 358 pp.
- History Should Not be Forgotten, 五洲传播出版社, 2005, 286 pp.

=== First published in English ===
- The Unfinished Revolution in China, Little Brown and Company (1947), hardcover, 442 pp.

=== Published in Chinese, translated into English ===
- From Opium War to Liberation, New World Press (Beijing, 1956), hardcover, 146 pp.
- Tibet Transformed, New World Press (Beijing, 1983), trade paperback, 563 pp, ISBN 0-8351-1087-7
- Woman in World History: Soong Ching Ling, New World Press (Beijing, 1993), hardcover, ISBN 7-80005-161-7

== See also ==
- Rewi Alley
- Sidney Rittenberg
- Sidney Shapiro
- Jews in China
- Round Eyes in the Middle Kingdom – a documentary about Israel Epstein
