= Xie Chuntao =

Chinese politician

- 谢春涛
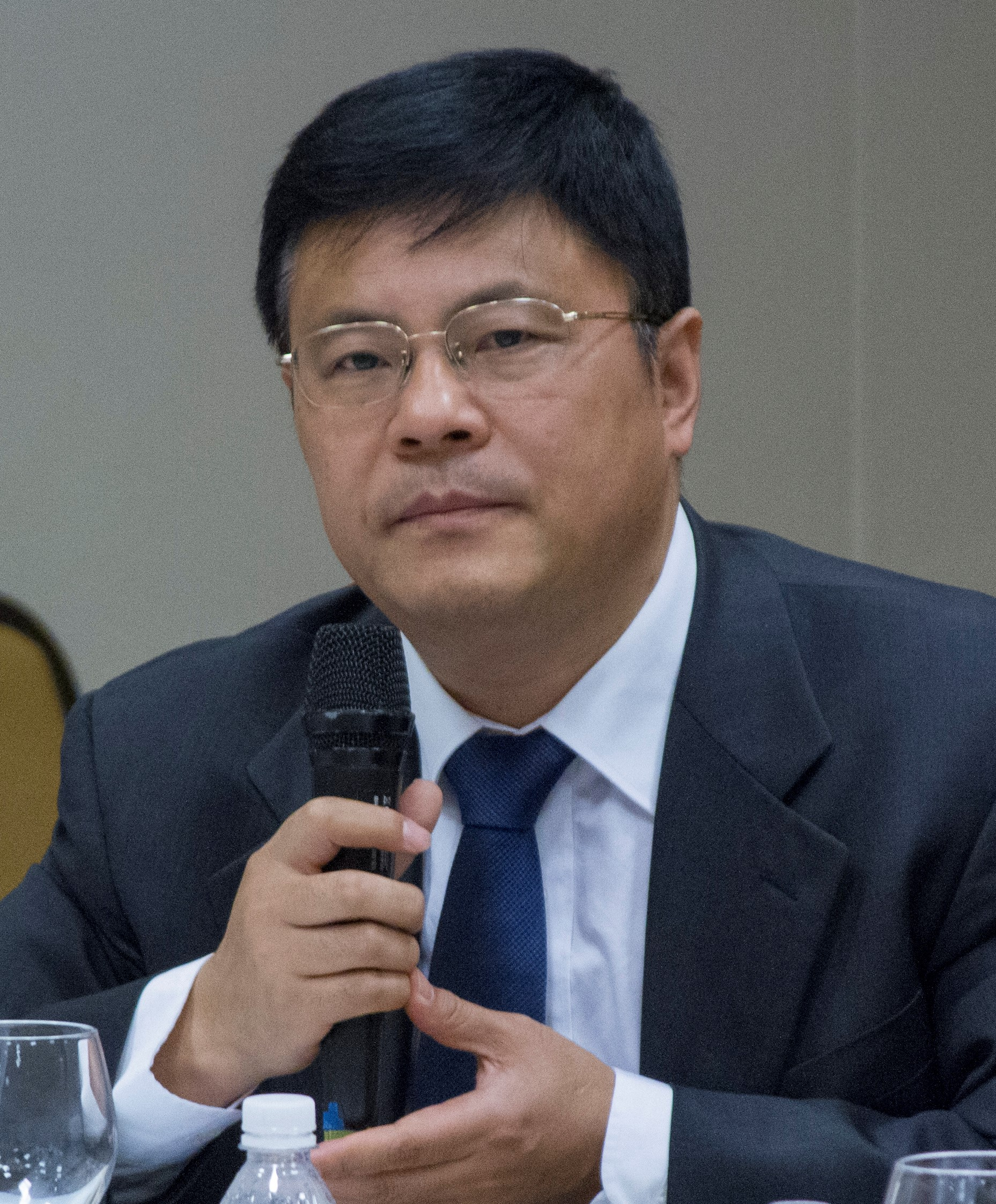
- Xie in 2015

Executive Vice President of the Central Party School of the Chinese Communist Party
- Incumbent
- Assumed office 25 June 2022
- President: Chen Xi
- Preceded by: Li Shulei

Personal details
- Born: February 1963 (age 63) Linshu County, Shandong, China
- Party: Chinese Communist Party
- Education: Shandong Normal University; Hangzhou University; Renmin University of China

Chinese name
- Simplified Chinese: 谢春涛
- Traditional Chinese: 謝春濤
Transcriptions
Standard Mandarin
- Hanyu Pinyin: Xiè Chūntāo

Xie Chuntao (Chinese: 谢春涛; born February 1963) is a Chinese writer and politician currently serving as vice president of the Central Party School of the Chinese Communist Party.

He was an alternate of the 19th Central Committee of the Chinese Communist Party.

== Biography ==
Xie was born in Linshu County, Shandong, in February 1963. He attended Shandong Normal University where he received his bachelor's degree in politics in 1982. After completing his master's degree in the history of the Chinese Communist Party from Hangzhou University in 1985, he entered the Renmin University of China where he obtained his doctor's degree in the history of the Chinese Communist Party in 1988.

Xie joined the Chinese Communist Party (CCP) in July 1985. Beginning in July 1988, he served in several posts in the Central Party School of the Chinese Communist Party, including deputy director and then director of Teaching and Research Office, president and chief editor of the Central Party School Press, and director of Academic Affairs Department. In May 2018, he was promoted to vice president of the Central Party School of the Chinese Communist Party. In June 2022, he was promoted again to become a ministerial level vice president.

== Publications ==
- 中国共产党重大历史事件纪实 [Record of Major Historical Events of the Chinese Communist Party] (in Chinese). Yinchuan, Ningxia: Ningxia People's Publishing House. 2006. ISBN 9787227031888.
- 转折中国：1976—1982 [China in Transition: 1976–1982] (in Chinese). Beijing: People's Publishing House. 2008. ISBN 9787010074771.
- 中国简史：从孔夫子到邓小平 [China Through the Ages: from Confucius to Deng Xiaoping] (in Chinese). Beijing: New World Press. 2009. ISBN 9787802285651.
- 毛泽东学习 [Learn from Mao Zedong] (in Chinese). Beijing: Central Party School Press. 2013. ISBN 9787503551833.
- 中国特色社会主义史 [History of Socialism with Chinese Characteristics] (in Chinese). Fuzhou, Fujian: Fujian People's Publishing House. 2013. ISBN 9787211068739.
- 中国梦 我的梦 [Chinese Dream My Dream] (in Chinese). Beijing: People's Publishing House. 2014. ISBN 9787010141466.
- 中国城镇化：亿万农民进城的故事 [China's Urbanization: the Story of Hundreds of Millions of Farmers Entering the City] (in Chinese). Beijing: New World Press. 2014. ISBN 9787510452123.
- 谢春涛党史论集 [Xie Chuntao's Collection of the History of the Chinese Communist Party] (in Chinese). Beijing: Zhonghua Book Company. 2013. ISBN 9787101095609.
- 中国共产党为什么能 [Why and How the CCP Works in China] (in Chinese). Beijing: New World Press. 2017. ISBN 9787510463099.
- 管党治党十六讲 [Sixteen Lectures on Managing the Party] (in Chinese). Beijing: China Fangzheng Press. 2017. ISBN 9787517404170.
- 改革开放为什么成功？ [Why Did Reform and Opening Up Succeed?] (in Chinese). Beijing: People's Publishing House. 2018. ISBN 9787010201658.
- 毛泽东著作要篇导读 [Guide to Reading the Works of Mao Zedong] (in Chinese). Beijing: People's Publishing House. 2018. ISBN 9787010190266.
- 中国共产党如何反腐败 [How Does the CCP Fight Against Corruption] (in Chinese). Beijing: New World Press. 2020. ISBN 9787510468209.
- 中国共产党如何应对挑战 [How Does the CCP Respond to Challenges] (in Chinese). Beijing: New World Press. 2020. ISBN 9787510468193.
- 中国共产党如何改变中国 [How the CCP Changes China] (in Chinese). Beijing: New World Press. 2020. ISBN 9787010218045.
- 中国共产党如何治理国家 [How the CCP Governs China] (in Chinese). Beijing: New World Press. 2020. ISBN 9787510468261.
- 中国共产党百年百事 [One Hundred Events of the Chinese Communist Party in the Past Century] (in Chinese). Beijing: Central Party School Press. 2021. ISBN 9787503572340.
- 中共党史十二讲 [Twelve Lectures on the History of the Chinese Communist Party] (in Chinese). Beijing: SDX Joint Publishing Company. 2021. ISBN 9787108071514.
- 人格的力量 [The Power of Personality] (in Chinese). Jinan, Shandong: Jinan Publishing House. 2021. ISBN 9787548844143.
- 读懂中国共产党 [Understand the Chinese Communist Party] (in Chinese). Beijing: Beijing United Publishing Co., Ltd. 2022. ISBN 9787559656155.

Party political offices
Preceded by Li Shulei	Vice President of the Central Party School of the Chinese Communist Party; 2022–	Incumbent
