= Sidney Shapiro =

American-born Chinese translator (1915–2014)

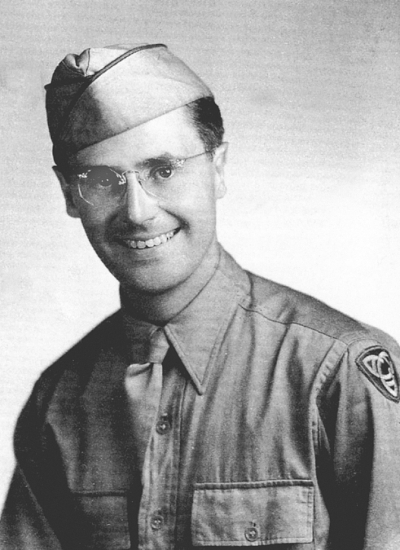
- Born: December 23, 1915; Brooklyn, New York, U.S.
- Died: October 18, 2014 (aged 98); Beijing, China
- Other name: Chinese: 沙博理
- Occupations: Actor, translator, writer
- Known for: Translation of Chinese novels of notable Chinese authors such as Ba Jin and Mao Dun into English. Became citizen of People's Republic of China.
- Spouse: Fengzi

Sidney Shapiro (Chinese: 沙博理; pinyin: Shā Bólǐ; December 23, 1915 – October 18, 2014) was an American-born Chinese actor, translator, and writer who lived in China from 1947 to 2014. He lived in Beijing for more than 50 years and became a member of the National Committee of the Chinese People's Political Consultative Conference. He was one of very few naturalized citizens of the People's Republic of China.

== Early life and later nationality ==
Shapiro was born in Brooklyn on December 23, 1915. He was of Ashkenazi Jewish descent. He was a graduate of St. John's University, New York.

Shapiro became a citizen of the People's Republic of China in 1963.

== Career ==
Shapiro was educated as a lawyer and was disturbed by perceived inequalities during the Great Depression in the United States. In 1941, he enlisted in the U.S. Army. He applied for French language school, and was sent to a Chinese language school in San Francisco.

His interest in China led him to travel to Shanghai in 1947, where he met his future wife, an actress named Fengzi (Phoenix), who was a supporter of the Chinese Communist Party. Partly through her influence, Shapiro became a supporter too. He settled in China and remained there after the Communists took power in 1949.

For nearly 50 years, Shapiro was employed by the state-run Foreign Languages Press (FLP) as a translator of works of Chinese literature. He is best known for his English version of Outlaws of the Marsh, a classic of Chinese literature. In 1958, he published an English translation of The Family, a novel by Ba Jin or Pa Chin, pen name of Li Yaotang (aka Feigan), one of the most widely read Chinese writers of the 20th century. Certain passages, notably the anarchist elements, were deleted from this edition; Shapiro later published a full translation.

Shapiro also worked as an editor for the journal Chinese Literature. The works he translated included Mao Dun's Silkworm and the works of Zhao Shuli.

Shapiro was also an actor in many Chinese movies, becoming typecast as the American villain.

In 1983, he was appointed as a member of the Chinese People's Political Consultative Council (CPPCC), which provides a forum for input from non-Communist political organizations.

Shapiro wrote a memoir I Chose China: The Metamorphosis of a Country and a Man, but its publication was delayed until 1997 because he feared that it would offend the Chinese authorities.

== Personal ==
Shapiro married Fengzi in 1948, and they had a daughter. Fengzi died in 1996. Shapiro died in Beijing on October 18, 2014. He was 98.

== Legacy ==
On December 26, 2014, the China International Publishing Group announced it was establishing a Sidney Shapiro Research Center to investigate and establish criteria for translation between Chinese and English.

== Works ==
=== Selected translations from Chinese to English ===
- Ba Jin, The Family, Beijing: Foreign Language Press, 1958
- Shi Nai'an, Outlaws of the Marsh, Beijing: Foreign Languages Press, 1980
- Ba Jin, Selected Works, Beijing: Foreign Language Press, 1988
- Mao Dun, The Shop of the Lin Family and Spring Silkworms, Hong Kong: Chinese University Press, 2004.
- Deng Rong, Deng Xiaoping and the Cultural Revolution: A Daughter Recalls the Critical Years, New York: C. Bertelsmann, 2005

=== Works compiled and edited ===
- Jews in Old China: Studies by Chinese Scholars, New York: Hippocrene Books, 1984; paperback edition: Hippocrene Books, 1988

=== Memoirs ===
- An American in China: Thirty Years in the People's Republic. New American Library 1979.
- I Chose China: The Metamorphosis of a Country and a Man, Hippocrene Books 1997.

== See also ==
- History of the Jews in China
- Israel Epstein
- Kaifeng Jews
- Rewi Alley
- Sidney Rittenberg
