= Family (Ba Jin novel) =

1933 autobiographical novel by Chinese author Ba Jin

- Cover of a 1949 edition of Family
- Author: Ba Jin
- Original title: 家
- Language: Chinese
- Series: Turbulent Stream
- Published: 1931–1932
- Publication place: China
- Followed by: Spring

Family (家, pinyin: Jiā, Wade-Giles: Chia^{1}), sometimes translated as The Family, is a semi-autobiographical novel by Chinese author Ba Jin, the pen-name of Li Feigan (1904–2005). His most famous novel, it chronicles inter-generational conflict between old ways and progressive aspirations in an upper-class family in the city of Chengdu, a prosperous but provincial city in the fertile Sichuan basin in the early 1920s following the New Culture Movement. The novel was wildly popular among China's youth and established the author as a leading voice of his generation.

The novel was first serialized in 1931–2 and then released in a single volume in 1933. The original title was Turbulent Stream (激流 Jīliú), but changed after Ba Jin released it as a single volume.

== Synopsis ==
The novel focuses on three brothers from the Gao family, Juexin, Juemin and Juehui, and their struggles with the oppressive autocracy of their fengjian and patriarchal family. The idealistic, if rash Juehui, the youngest brother, is the main protagonist, and he is frequently contrasted with the weak eldest brother Juexin, who gives in to the demands from his grandfather, agrees to an arranged marriage and carries on living a life he does not like to live.

== Characters ==
- Gao Juexin (traditional Chinese: 高覺新; simplified Chinese: 高觉新; pinyin: Gāo Juéxīn; Wade–Giles: Kao^{1} Chüeh^{2}-hsin^{1}) - The eldest brother, who was forced into quitting his university studies and into marrying a woman other than the one he loved.
  - Juexin obeys the Gao family, despite the disapproval from his two brothers. Even though Juexin is in love with Mei, his cousin, he marries Li Ruijue on the orders of Master Gao after he graduates from middle school. After Juemin escapes from the Gao household, Master Gao asks Juexin to find Juemin. Juexin asks Juehui to help him, but the youngest brother accuses Juexin of being a coward. After learning about Mei's death, Juexin is saddened. Han said that "[t]he miserable experience" awakens Juexin, who begins opposing Master Gao.
  - Mei Han, author of the entry on "Family" in The Facts on File Companion to the World Novel: 1900 to the Present, said that Juexin "is a victim of conservatism" who is asked to stop observing idealism, loses the women who are dear to him, and "does nothing but cries in the corner." Jin Feng, author of The New Woman in Early Twentieth-Century Chinese Fiction, said that Juexin is "a character used by a foil to impress upon the reader Juehui's revolutionary courage as compared to people of his own generation and gender." Feng added that while Juehui believes that Juexin is a '"coward who makes "unnecessary sacrifices" of himself and the women he loves', Juehui "cannot help but sympathize with Juexin's dilemma, and in fact often depends on him as a buffer against abuses by their grandfather and uncles." Han says that Juexin is also an "accomplice" since he helps Master Gao try to find Juemin, and that Juexin "insists on nonresistance" despite the fact that he agrees with his brothers. Han argued that Juexin's obedience to the family angers Juehui despite the mercy that Juehui feels for Juexin, "reflecting the author's own attitude toward" Juexin.
- Gao Juemin (高覺民; 高觉民; Gāo Juémín; Kao^{1} Chüeh^{2}-min^{2}) - The middle brother.
  - Juemin wears glasses. Juemin is in love with Qin, his cousin. Juemin anticipates the time when his academy begins admitting female students so that the two can get together and marry. Master Gao asks Juemin to marry the Grandniece of Milord Feng, but Juemin instead leaves the house, with Juehui helping him escape. Master Gao later ends the engagement and gives permission for Juemin and Qin to marry.
- Gao Juehui (高覺慧; 高觉慧; Gāo Juéhuì; Kao^{1} Chüeh^{2}-hui^{4}) - The most rebellious of the brothers.
  - Juehui has an interest in the ideals of the May Fourth Movement. Juehui has a romantic interest in Mingfeng. Han says that Juehui "pays more attention to the rebellion" than to Mingfeng. After Mingfeng's death he feels remorse. At the end of the novel, he believes staying in the family is too suffocating, so he leaves Chengdu to go to Shanghai.
  - According to Feng, Juehui is "the center of consciousness" in Family. Feng said that while Juehui "is apparently the most fearless and rebellious of the three brothers" he also "is by no means the heroic role model that he has read about in new books and journals—the sources of all his new ideas." Feng argues that "Juehui betrays the most pronounced contradictions through his interactions with his family" and that Juehui "often finds himself helplessly entangled in ambivalent feelings" while dealing with his family, using his interactions with Juexin as an example. Han argued that while being "high-spirited youth rebelling against his family's restrictions", Juehui "still possesses ideas" from the Gao Family traditions. As an example she cites his pattern of affection for Mingfeng. Han argues that despite the fact that he likes her, "he never expresses his love or his hidden dreams: If only Mingfeng were a lady like Qin, he would marry her in a heartbeat."
- Li Ruijue (李瑞玨; 李瑞珏; Lǐ Ruìjué; Li^{3} Jui^{4}-chüeh^{2}) - Juexin's wife. She marries him and falls in love with him, but realizes that Juexin still loves Mei more than her. She dies in childbirth.
  - Han said that Ruijue "is beautiful and mild, and their intensive love produces their first boy, Hai Chen." After Master Gao dies, as Ruijue is pregnant with a second child, relatives cajole Juexin into moving Ruijue out of the city to avoid giving the coffin of Master Gao. Despite Juehui's pleas to have it reversed, Juexin allows the move to happen, and Ruijue dies of childbirth as Juexin is prevented from entering the delivery room during the period of mourning for Master Gao.
- Mei (Chinese: 梅; pinyin: Méi; Wade–Giles: Mei^{2}) - Juexin's cousin and the love of his life. She falls ill and dies.
  - Han said that Mei "lives a miserable life." Within a year from the start of the novel she marries and becomes a widow. Because her mother-in-law had not treated her well, she lives with her mother. Han said that the Gao family's younger members, especially Juexin, "are sympathetic" to Mei.
- Mingfeng (鳴鳳; 鸣凤; Míngfèng; Ming^{2}-feng^{4}) - A maidservant who is forced to marry an older man. She commits suicide.
  - Han describes Mingfeng as "another tragic woman" in the Gao family. Mingfeng wants to marry Juehui but Master Gao arranges to have her be a mistress to Milord Feng, a man who is at the same age level as Mingfeng's grandfather would be. Mingfeng begs other members to remove her from the situation but nobody can challenge Master Gao. At midnight before she is to be given to Feng, she appears in Juehui's bedroom but he is so busy working on academic articles that he does not notice Mingfeng and her pleas. She commits suicide by drowning herself in a pool of water. Han says "Jue Min [sic] and others pity the girl, while Jue Hui [sic] now regrets his carelessness. However, none of the people could have changed Mingfeng's fate."
- Qin (琴; Qín; Ch'in^{2}): A female cousin of Gao Juexin, and a student.
  - Feng said that Qin "is ensconced, somewhat ironically, in extensive and complex familial relationships" so that the book rarely mentions her life away from the Gao family. Feng explained that because Ba Jin made the female student Qin as a more "feminine" and "inferior" counterpart to the male student Juehui, the "domestication" of Qin is "necessary". Feng argued that "at first glance" Qin and Juehui "seem to me more similar than different", and their parallel and symmetrical placement within the storyline of Family "serves both to segregate the domains of their activities by gender and to differentiate the degree of their radicalism." For instance Feng notes that Qin does not come into conflict with male characters in her immediate or extended family and "acts as a dutiful and loving daughter to her widowed mother" while Juehui "usually displays an antagonistic attitude" towards older men in the Gao family and Juehui leaves the Gao family home. Feng concluded that the fact that Juehui leaves his house means that "his conflicts with the traditional family system are more fundamental and irreconcilable than those in Qin's case." Feng argued that the author "deployed Qin to magnify Juehui's revolutionary zeal" by emphasizing differences that the two characters have in their emotional responses and respective relationships to the members of the Gao family and also "located the source of Qin's weakness in her gender and thus reaffirmed Juehui's superiority."
- Master Gao - The head of the Gao family.
  - As Master Gao grows older, he attempts to reunite the Gao family.
  - Han argues that Master Gao is "complex". She explained that Master Gao in fact loves his family and takes steps to enlarge it to accomplish his goal of having a large family, and that he does not believe that his decisions, which are based on ancestral rules, would harm his children. Han concluded that "Withdrawing his order on his deathbed shows that he remained a kind grandfather at the end, even if he was an ironhanded patriarch."
- Madam Zhou

== Publication history, translations, and adaptations ==
The novel was first serialized in 1931-2. Together with Spring and Autumn, two novels Ba Jin wrote in the period 1939-40, it forms the trilogy, Turbulent Stream Trilogy (激流三部曲).

An English translation by Sidney Shapiro was published in 1958 by Foreign Languages Press (Beijing), with a third edition in 1978. Shapiro's translation was based on the 1953 People's Publishing House text, in which the author made corrections. Ba Jin made further changes for Shapiro's translation. The 1972 Anchor Books (New York) edition was edited by Olga Lang, Ba Jin's biographer. The New York edition omits the article "the" from the title, which makes "family" a more general concept rather than limiting it to this particular family. In her Editor's Note, Lang discusses the history of the text, pointing out that certain passages, the anarchist elements, had been deleted from the 1958 Foreign Languages Press edition. The Anchor edition restored three prefaces by the author, newly translated, as well as some of the omitted passages.

A play and two films were based on the novel. The play was adapted by famous playwright Cao Yu in 1941. A Mainland Chinese TV adaptation, starring Huang Lei, Lu Yi and Huang Yi, was produced in 2007.

Ba Jin mentions Wu Yu (a.k.a. Wu Youling), when Juemin and Juexin discuss in a favorable manner how he is going to teach at their school. In the Sidney Shapiro translation Wu Yu is not mentioned by name; instead he is referred to as "the man who wrote that article, 'Cannibal Confucian Morality' in the New Youth magazine"

== Comparative perspective ==
Family mentions many of the books and authors which inflamed the young protagonists, giving a vivid picture of intellectual life in a provincial capital. The tone and theme was influenced by works that also influenced many Chinese authors of Ba Jin's generation, for instance A Doll's House by Henrik Ibsen, about the fate of a woman trapped in the physical and social structures of her marriage. Family is often compared to the 18th-century novel, Dream of the Red Chamber, a richly poetic and tragic chronicle of the life of a prominent family living within a great house. Though he did not mention it as a model, Ba Jin, like all educated Chinese of his time, had been familiar with the work from his youth. Where the earlier work is fatalistic and told with philosophical allegory, however, the young heroes of Family leaves home to pursue lives of worldly engagement.

== Reception ==
Mei Han, author of the "Family" entry in The Facts on File Companion to the World Novel: 1900 to the Present, said that the most "moving" portions of Family were the deaths of Mingfeng, Mei, and Ruijue.

Diana Lary of the University of British Columbia stated that "Sadly, there is no good translation of the novels in English", referring to the entire Turbulent Stream trilogy.
