= Chi Zijian =

Chinese novelist

- 迟子建
- Born: 27 February 1964 (age 62); Mohe, Heilongjiang, China
- Education: Daxing'anling Normal College; Northwest University; Beijing Normal University; Lu Xun Literature College
- Occupation: Novelist
- Spouse: Huang Shijun (m. 1998; died 2002)
- Writing career
- Language: Chinese
- Period: 1983–present
- Genre: Novel
- Notable work: The Last Quarter of the Moon
- Notable awards: Full list

Chinese name
- Traditional Chinese: 遲子建
- Simplified Chinese: 迟子建
Transcriptions
Standard Mandarin
- Hanyu Pinyin: Chí Zǐjiàn

Chi Zijian (Chinese: 迟子建; born 27 February 1964) is a Chinese novelist. She is best known for her novel The Last Quarter of the Moon which won the Mao Dun Literary Prize (2008), one of the most prestigious literature prizes in China.

== Biography ==
Chi was born in Mohe County, Heilongjiang in February 1964. Her father, Chi Zefeng (迟泽凤), was the president of a local school. Chi Zijian was named after his father's idol Cao Zijian, a poet and prince of the state of Cao Wei in the Three Kingdoms period.

Chi entered Daxing'anling Normal College (大兴安岭师范学校) in 1981, graduating in 1984. She started to publish novels in 1983.

In 1988, Chi was accepted to Northwest University, majoring in writing. One year later, she attended Beijing Normal University and Lu Xun Literary Institute.

In 1990, Chi joined the Heilongjiang Writers Association.

Her novel, The Last Quarter of the Moon, was published in 2005, which won the Mao Dun Literary Prize in 2008.

Chi won the Lu Xun Literary Prize in 1996, 2000, and 2007.

== Political career ==
Chi was a member of the 12th and 13th National Committee of the Chinese People's Political Consultative Conference (CPPCC). On January 15, 2020, she was elected vice-chairwoman of the CPPCC Heilongjiang Provincial Committee.

== Works ==
=== Novels ===
Year	Title	Publisher	ISBN
1991	茫茫前程 (Boundless Future)	Shanghai Literature and Art Publishing House	7-5321-0978-X
1997	晨钟响彻黄昏 (The Morning Bell Rings at Dusk)	Jiangsu Literature and Art Publishing House	9787539911519
1998	热鸟 (Hot Bird)	Tomorrow Publishing House	9787501610433
2000	伪满洲国 (Manchukuo)	Writers Publishing House	9787506319812
2001	树下 (Under the Tree)	Beiyue Literature and Art Publishing House	9787537822633
2003	越过云层的晴朗 (The Brightness Beyond the Clouds)	Shanghai Literature and Art Publishing House	9787532124954
2004	伪满洲国 (Manchukuo)	People's Literature Publishing House	9787020074464
2005	额尔古纳河右岸 (The Last Quarter of the Moon)	Beijing October Literature and Art Publishing House	9787530209936
2009	越过云层的晴朗 (The Brightness Beyond the Clouds)	Writers Publishing House	9787506348683
2010	白雪乌鸦 (White Snow, Black Crows)	People's Literature Publishing House	9787020081677
2015	群山之巅 (Atop the Mountains)	People's Literature Publishing House	9787020106936
2020	烟火漫卷 (Smoke Fire Sweeps Through)	People's Literature Publishing House	9787020134007

=== Novellas ===
- White Snow and Crow (白雪乌鸦)
- All Night in the World (世界上所有的夜晚)
- Yellow Chicken and White Wine (黄鸡白酒)
- Good Night, Rose (晚安玫瑰)

=== Short stories ===
- Fog, Moon, and the Cattle Pen (雾月牛栏)
- Qingshui Xichen (清水洗尘)
- A Jar of Lard (一坛猪油)

=== Translated Works ===
Year	Title	Language	Publisher	Translator	Country	Genre
1995	The River Rolls By (逝川)	English	Chinese Literature. no. (Autumn 1995): 129		China	Short Story
1996	Beloved Potatoes (亲亲土豆)	English	Chinese Literature. no. 2, (1996): 122		China	Short Story
1997	Lost in the Ox Pen (雾月牛栏)	English	Chinese Literature. no. 4, (1997): 56		China	Short Story
1997	La danseuse de yangge: Voyage au pays des nuits blanches (秧歌：向着白夜旅行)	French	Bleu de Chine	Dong Chun	Paris, France	Novella
1998	Silver Plates (银盘)	English	Chinese Literature. no. 4, (1998): 74		China	Short Story
1999	SPECIAL - The Primary Sentiemt	English	Chinese Literature. no. 4, (1999): 143		China	Short Story Collection
2002	Le bracelet de jade: nouvelles (旧时代的磨坊)	French	Bleu de Chine	Dong Chun	Paris, France	Novella
2004	La fabrique d' encens: suivie de Neuf pensées (香坊：九朵蝴蝶花)	French	Bleu de Chine	Dong Chun	Paris, France	Novella
2004	Figments of The Supernatural	English	James Joyce Press	Simon Patton	Sydney, Australia	Short Story Collection
2005	A Flock in The Wilderness (原野上的羊群)	English	Foreign Language Press	Xiong Zhenru	China	Short Story Collection
2005	The Good Times Are Slowly Slipping Away (好时光悄悄溜走)	English	Long River Press	Ren Zhong, Yuzhi Yang	San Francisco, US	Prose Collection
2006	An Encounter with General Zhou (与周瑜相遇)	English	Columbia University Press	Aili Mu, Julie Chiu, Howard Goldblatt	New York, US	Short Story
2012	A Jar of Lard (一坛猪油)	English	Pathlight: New Chinese Writing 2	Chenxin Jiang	China	Short Story
2012	Foggy Moon Corral (雾月牛栏)	English	Long River Press		San Francisco, US	Short Story
2013	The Last Quarter of the Moon (额尔古纳河右岸)	English	Harvill Secker	Humes, Bruce	London, UK	Novel
2013	An Ode to Darkness (我对黑暗的柔情)	English	National Library Board	Wai Har Lau, Can Zhou	Singapor	Prose
2013	Toutes les nuits du monde: récits (世界上所有的夜晚)	French	Éditions Philippe Picquier	Lévêque Stéphane	Arles, France	Novella
2015	A Horse and Two People (一匹马两个人)	English	Pathlight: New Chinese Writing (Summer 2015)	Karmia Olutade	China	Short Story
2015	Bonsoir, la rose: roman (晚安玫瑰)	French	Éditions Philippe Picquier	André Yvonne	Arles, France	Novella
2016	Le dernier quartier de lune (额尔古纳河右岸)	French	Éditions Philippe Picquier	André Yvonne, Lévêque Stéphane	Arles, France	Novel
2016	A Flurry of Blessings (福翩翩)	English	Chinese Literature Today (2016)	Eleanor Goodman	China	Novella

== Awards ==
- 6th Zhuang Zhongwen Literary Prize (1993)
- Fog, Moon, and the Cattle Pen – Lu Xun Literary Prize (1996)
- Qingshui Xichen – Lu Xun Literary Prize (2000)
- All Night in the World – Lu Xun Literary Prize (2007)
- The Last Quarter of the Moon – Mao Dun Literature Prize (2008)

== Personal life ==
In 1998, Chi married Huang Shijun (黄世君), who was the CPC County Committee Secretary of Tahe. In May 2002, Huang died in a car accident.
