= Aurore de la Morinerie =

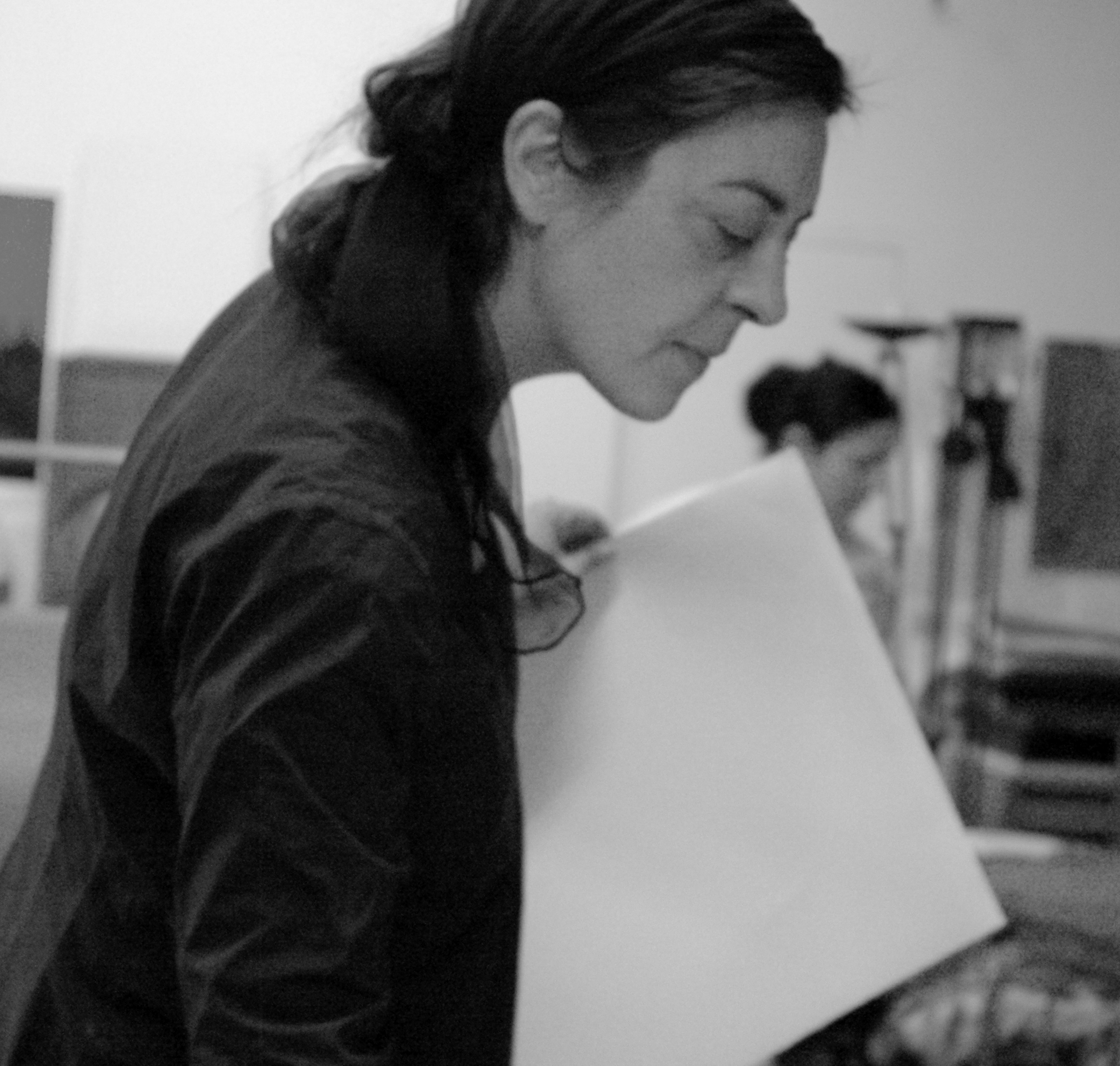
- Born: 1962 (age 63–64); Saint-Lô, France
- Education: École Duperré
- Website: auroredelamorinerie.com

Aurore de la Morinerie (born 1962 in Saint Lô, France) is a French artist and illustrator recognized for her minimalist and evocative ink and monotype illustrations. She currently resides and works in Paris, France.

== Artistic career ==
Aurore de la Morinerie initially trained in fashion design at the École Duperré in Paris before transitioning to illustration. Her artistic style is influenced by her studies in Chinese calligraphy, which she integrates into her work through fluid, abstract forms, refined brushstrokes, and a pronounced use of negative space. Her work frequently explores themes of nature, movement, and the human form, evoking a serene and meditative quality.

Her illustrations have been published in Vogue and featured in campaigns for luxury brands such as Hermès, Chanel, Maison Margiela and Van Cleef & Arpels. In addition to her individual artwork, she operates a studio specializing in bespoke illustration services for luxury brands and editorial projects. Her contributions to the fields of art and design are celebrated for their elegance and craftsmanship.

== Exhibitions ==
Aurore de la Morinerie's work has been featured in numerous solo and group exhibitions worldwide. Highlights include:

2026:

- Aurore de la Morinerie - Dessiner Alaïa – Galerie Moussy, Paris, France - Fondation Azzedine Alaïa - Solo show (November 15, 2026 – January 3, 2027).
- J.M Weston Atelier – Nibonbashi Hamacho, Tokyo, Japan - (November 8, 2026 - May, 2027).
- Art Paris 2026 – Grand Palais, Paris, France - Galerie Echo 119 - Group show (9-12 April 2026).
- Tara, naviguer pour créer // 12 artistes à bord – Galerie du Faouëdic, Lorient, France - Group show (February 14 – May 17, 2026).

2025:

- Mers invisibles – Galerie Écho 119, Paris, France - Group show (11 September – 25 October 2025).
- Rêve ! – Campredon art & image, L'Isle-sur-la-Sorgue, France - Group show (19 April – 12 October 2025).

2024:

- The Great Expedition: Tara, Art, and Science to Reveal the Ocean – Le CENTQUATRE, Paris, France - Group show (16 November 2024 – 2 March 2025).
- Fashion – VLC Gallery by Akio Nagasawa, Toranomon, Japan - Solo show (22 July – 29 November 2024).
- In the Wave – Campredon art & image, L'Isle-sur-la-Sorgue, France - Group show (30 March – 6 October 2024).
- The Rays and Shadows – Akio Nagasawa Gallery, Ginza, Japan (11 April – 1 June 2024).
- Faire trace: Pré-Assemblages 2023 – Palau Martorel, Barcelona, Spain - Group show (July 2024).

2022:

- Study 3 with Aurore de la Morinerie – Ephemera Kyoto '22, Honen-in Temple, Japan - Solo show (19 November 2022).
- Aurore de la Morinerie – Galerie Anthologie, Paris, France - Solo show (30 June – 15 July 2022).

2019:

- #FINAESTAMPA_, Illustration and Fashion – Museo ABC, Madrid, Spain - Group show (15 January – 19 May 2019).
- Masters of Fashion – Galerie Stefan Vogdt, Munich, Germany - Group show (14 September – 25 October 2019).
- Deep Blue - A tribute to TARA – Gallery Dumonteil, Shanghai, China - Group show (21 September 2019 – 27 October 2019).

2018:

- Tribute to Alaïa – Akio Nagasawa Gallery, Aoyama, Japan - Solo show (29 November 2018 – 23 February 2019).

2015:

- La Mode Retrouvée - Les robes trésors de la comtesse Greffulhe – Palais Galliera, Paris, France - Group show (7 November 2015 – 20 March 2016).

== Public and private collections ==
De la Morinerie's works are included in the collections of:

- Palais Galliera, Fashion Museum of the City of Paris.
- MAD, Museum of Decorative Arts in Paris.
- Private collectors

== Artist books and bibliography ==
Publications include:

- Tara: Artists Reveal the Ocean (2024), The Eyes Publishing.
- Atlas of Perfume – Louis Vuitton (2024), Thames & Hudson.
- The Rays and Shadows (2024), Akio Nagasawa Publishing.
- A Journey to Cognac (2023), Flammarion.
- Mediterranean Sea (2022), Louis Vuitton.
- Non-Animal Origin (2022), Éditions Chêne.
- Rediscovered Fashion: The Treasured Dresses of Countess Greffulhe (2015), Paris-Musées.
- #FINAESTAMPA_ Illustration and Fashion (2019), Museo ABC.
- Sammode: In Full Tube (2020), Flammarion.
- Quatremer le Céleste (2017), Éditions MeMo.
- Lancel: A Parisian Maison Since 1876 (2016), Flammarion.
- Who Are You? What Do You Do? (2013), Éditions MeMo.
- Tara Oceans: Chronicles of a Scientific Expedition (2012), Actes Sud.
- How Adam Named the Animals (2000), Desclée De Brouwer.
- Tibetan Tales: Akhu Tonpa and the Wealthy Horseman (2007), École des Loisirs.
- Taste of Asia: An Encyclopedia of Asian Cuisine (2001), Philippe Picquier.
- Fish Sins (2000), Philippe Picquier.
- The Book of Noodles (1999), Philippe Picquier.
