= The Last Quarter of the Moon =

2005 novel by Chi Zijian

- Author: Chi Zijian
- Original title: 额尔古纳河右岸
- Language: Chinese
- Genre: novel
- Publication date: 2005
- Publication place: China
- Media type: Print (paperback)
- OCLC: 470015866

The Last Quarter of the Moon (Chinese: 额尔古纳河右岸) is a 2005 novel by Chinese writer Chi Zijian. This novel is about the nomadic Evenki clan in northern Heilongjiang. It was first published in China in 2005 and has won the Mao Dun Literature Prize in 2008. The English version was translated by Bruce Humes and published by Penguin Random House in 2013.

== Reception ==
The Independent's Lucy Popescu highly praised the translation by Humes and wrote that "Zijian's beautifully realised novel offers a detailed portrait of a way of life hard to imagine today. [...] The natural beauty that surrounds the Evenki people is celebrated in lyrical prose". In the same newspaper, Daniel Hahn argued that "the story is masterfully told, with simplicity and empathy, in a direct and credible voice that not only feels unlike a translation, but unlike a fiction at all." Kate Saunders of The Times called it "capacious [...] both the private story of one family and a history of China [...] Zijian has an extraordinary gift for storytelling". Jane Housham said that the culture of the Evenki is "so enthrallingly evoked". Freya McClements argued that "Zijian's language is infused with natural images of her native China – a bitter couple is 'a pair of weathered cliffs facing each other' – and these envelop the reader in the shrinking world of the Evenkis".
