= Cho Soo-jin =

South Korean choreographer

- 조수진
- Born: January 6, 1974 (age 52); Incheon, South Korea
- Education: Beijing Language and Culture University
- Occupation: Dancer

Korean name
- Hangul: 조수진
- Hanja: 趙守鎭
- RR: Jo Sujin
- MR: Cho Sujin

Cho Soo-jin (Korean: 조수진; born January 6, 1974) is a South Korean choreographer. After working as an aerobics instructor in China, she is famous for introducing and popularizing the cheerleading culture for the first time and served as general manager of China's official cheering squad at the 2008 Summer Olympics in Beijing.

== Life ==
Cho Soo-jin was born on 6 January 1974 in Incheon, Gyeonggi-do (currently Incheon Metropolitan City) and graduated from Incheon Gajwa Girls' Middle School and Munil Girls' High School. Cho Soo-jin has been interested in dance since childhood, and in 1981, when she was in the second grade of elementary school, she participated as a representative of all students at the school's autumn sports day and made choreography.

Cho Soo-jin won first place at the Incheon Middle School Dance Competition held in 1986 when she was in the first grade of middle school, and at the recommendation of teachers, she first encountered aerobics at the academy. She has been an aerobics instructor since 1988 when she was in his third year of middle school, and in 1992, she spent six months training at the University of Sydney, Australia, to learn aerobics.

Cho Soo-jin wanted to become a ballerina when she was young, but she gave up because of the difficult family situation that she witnessed her parents' divorce when she was six years old. In particular, the furniture at home was seized due to the father's wrong debt guarantee process. Meanwhile, Cho Soo-jin left for China with only 4 million won while watching a documentary related to China on television in 1994, and started studying abroad.

Cho Soo-jin entered the University of International Business and Economics in 1994, and pretended to be a Chinese people to save money while illegally living in a shabby apartment with low housing prices. Then, in 1995, she worked as an aerobics instructor at the Kangmeida (康美達) Sports Center in Beijing, witnessing a three-fold increase in salary in just a month. Cho Soo-jin majored in Chinese when she transferred to Beijing Language University in 1996 and became a local-level Chinese speaker. Cho Soo-jin graduated in 1999 with a bachelor's degree from Beijing Eohen University. At the graduation ceremony, she boldly cut Cheongsam, Chinese traditional clothes, into miniskirts.

Cho Soo-jin appeared on Beijing Television's aerobics program from 1999 to 2003, causing an aerobic craze in various parts of China, drawing attention for his "Dancing Aerobics", which combines dance music with aerobic movements. In 1999, Cho Soo-jin formed an aerobics demonstration team and was in charge of directing and organizing and played a role in spreading dancing aerobics to various parts of China. In 2000, she became the general manager of Nirvana, a fitness center located in Beijing, and in 2002, she also served as Nike's exclusive model for Chinese advertising.

Cho Soo-jin served as the head of the China national football team, Qiumi (球迷), who participated in the 2002 FIFA World Cup co-hosted in South Korea and Japan, and in 2002, she was in charge of cheerleading performances for his basketball teams through a contract with the Chinese Basketball Association (CBA). In April 2005, she founded a dance team named after herself, Soojin Dance (simplified Chinese: 守镇之舞; traditional Chinese: 守鎮之舞; pinyin: Shǒuzhènzhīwǔ). On 30 October 2005, she married Michael Young, a Chinese diplomat in the United States.

Cho Soo-jin served as general manager of China's official cheering squad at the 2008 Summer Olympics in Beijing, and as many as 380 cheerleaders successfully performed more than 300 times in various events. Cho Soo-jin was the host of the talk show program Her Village (天下女人), which aired on Hunan Satellite Television from 2009 to 2013 along with Yang Ran and Li Ai. In 2018, she had an interview with China's China Pictorial and introduced herself as CEO of Soojin Dance and CEO of Our Bakery.

== Books ==
- A woman who wakes up Chinese morning (Korean: 중국의 아침을 깨우는 여자; Gimm-Young Publishers, Inc.: 2002)
