= Qi Pingjing =

Chinese government official

Qi Pingjing (Chinese: 齐平景; born July 1954) was a former Chinese government official. During his career, Qi served as the Deputy Director of the China International Publishing Group and the chief executive of the China International Book Trading Corporation. In December 2013 Qi was removed from his positions and placed under investigation by the Central Commission for Discipline Inspection of the Chinese Communist Party.

Qi was born in Jin County (晋县), Hebei province. He studied French language at Beijing Foreign Studies University and graduated in 1975. He began work at the China International Book Trading Corporation (CIBTC) starting in 1975. Between 1975 and 1977 Qi studied literature in Morocco. Between 1977 and 1981, he served as a French interpreter. He went to study in France twice. Qi became responsible for the company's French language department, responsible for Europe and the Americas. Between 1992 and 1993 he worked to import and export literature to Germany. He became an assistant to the General Manager of the company in 1993. Qi joined the Chinese Communist Party in October 1995. He was promoted to deputy general manager of CIBTC in May 1996. He became the deputy director of China International Publishing Group (中国外文局) and also general manager (i.e., chief executive) of CIBTC in July 2002. He sat on the board that determined translation and interpretation standardized testing regulations in China.

On October 11, 2013, Qi was detained by the Central Commission for Discipline Inspection. On December 26, the party investigation concluded that Qi took bribes and referred him to judicial authorities. He was expelled from the Chinese Communist Party.
