= Type 50 (military uniforms) =

Chinese People's Liberation Army uniform

Type 50 uniforms (Chinese: 中国人民解放军50式军服) of the People's Liberation Army were the first unified standard uniforms issued to the PLA after the founding of the People's Republic of China. It was named the Type 50 uniform because it was approved in 1950.

== Overview ==
After the founding of the People's Republic of China, the PLA rapidly developed from a nearly single-service force into a force with complete land, sea, and air branches.

To unify the uniforms of the entire army, the General Logistics Department of the PLA organized the design of new uniforms and cap badges. After approval by Mao Zedong, Chairman of the Central Military Commission, and Vice Chairmen Liu Shaoqi, Zhu De and Zhou Enlai, it was officially implemented on January 4, 1950, and officially distributed to the troops starting in April.

== Clothing ==
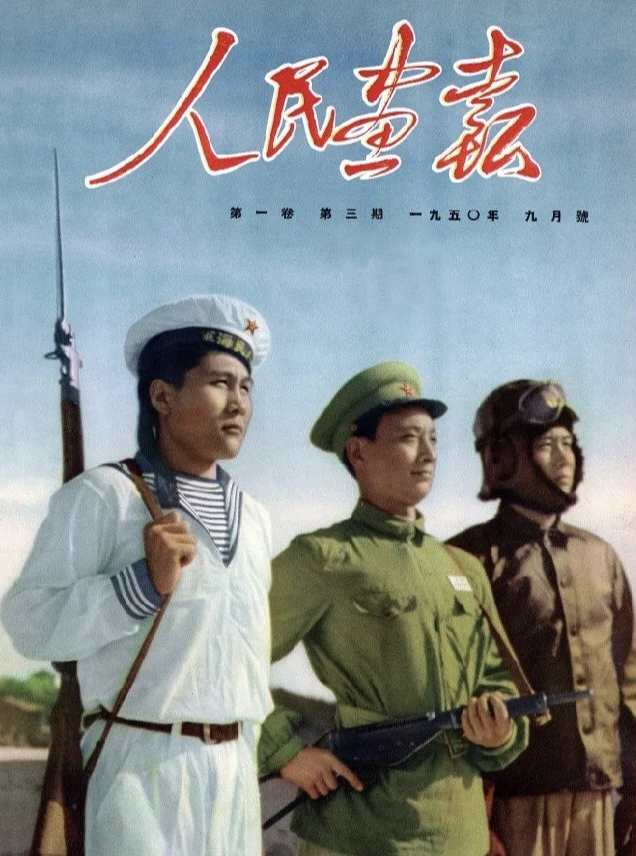
Soldiers of the Chinese People's Liberation Army wearing the Type 50 military uniform (People's Pictorial)

The Type 50 uniform was the earliest unified standard uniform of the PLA. It was distinguished by the three branches of the armed forces (army, navy, and air force), officers, soldiers, male and female soldiers, summer uniforms, and winter uniforms.

A significant feature of the Type 50 uniform was that it was the first time in the history of the PLA that a dress uniform series was established. However, due to the limitations of the time, dress uniforms and service uniforms were only distinguished by different fabrics and buttons. Army Dress Uniform

Army dress uniforms consisted of a grass-green peaked cap (a new "Liberation Cap" was added in 1951), a grass-green front-opening jacket with five brass buttons and two unbuttoned upper pockets. Trousers were dress trousers, and leather shoes were worn. The dress uniform was initially made of khaki cloth, but was changed to woolen fabric after August 1950.

== Service Uniforms ==
=== Officer Service Uniform ===
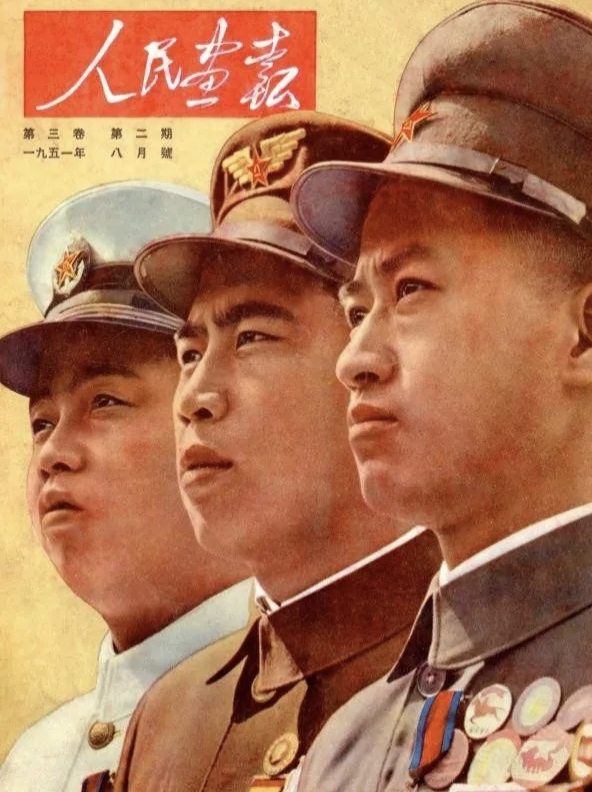
Chinese People's Liberation Army officers wearing Type 50 uniforms (People's Pictorial)

The style of the officer service uniform was basically the same as the dress uniform, except that the buttons were changed from brass to bakelite. Initially, the service uniform was made of light yellowish-green cloth. After August 1950, officers at the regimental level and above changed to grass-green woolen fabric. The winter uniform for officers at the regimental level and above was basically the same as the summer uniform, while the winter uniform for officers below the battalion level consisted of a similar style of cotton-padded jacket, worn with a brimmed fur hat or cotton hat in winter.

Army Soldiers' Service Uniform: Army soldiers wore a peaked cap, a light yellow, half-open pullover with three bakelite buttons at the front, a stand-up collar, tight cuffs, a flared hem, and two upper pockets with openings on the chest. Trousers were dress trousers, paired with cloth shoes. Winter uniforms consisted of a front-opening cotton-padded jacket and a brimmed cotton cap. In 1951, a liberation cap was added; in 1952, the pullover was discontinued, and a front-opening uniform was adopted, with the liberation cap worn.

Navy Dress Uniform: Navy dress uniforms consisted of a front-opening navy blue uniform and a peaked cap, basically the same style as the Army dress uniform.

Naval Ship Dress Uniforms consisted of a front-opening bleached white uniform, paired with bleached white trousers and a peaked cap, made of twill fabric.

Officer Service Uniforms: The style was basically the same as the Army's, but the color was all blue in winter and white on top and blue on the bottom in summer. Ship officers and officers above battalion level on shore wore woolen fabric in winter, while others wore ordinary fabric.

Navy Soldiers' Service Uniforms: Navy soldiers wear sailor uniforms. Winter uniforms are all blue and made of woolen fabric. Summer uniforms are white on top and blue on the bottom, made of ordinary fabric. They wear Type 50 sailor caps with the words "Chinese People's Navy" inscribed on the cap band. Shore-based soldiers wear blue open-front uniforms and liberation caps.

Air Force: Dress Uniforms: Air Force dress uniforms are basically the same style as the Army's, with a grass-green top and navy blue bottom.

Service Uniforms: Air Force service uniforms are basically the same style as the Army's, with a grass-green top and navy blue bottom. There is little difference between soldier and officer service uniforms.

Female Military Uniforms: Female military uniforms in summer are pullover long-sleeved dresses with stand-up collars, a cloth belt at the waist, and a skirt hem below the knee. Shorts are also worn. Army and Air Force dresses are all yellow-green, while Navy dresses are all navy blue. Winter uniforms are Lenin-style, with small collars, large open fronts, double-breasted with ten buttons, and trousers. Military caps included peaked caps, fur-lined caps, fleece caps, and cotton caps.

== Accessories ==
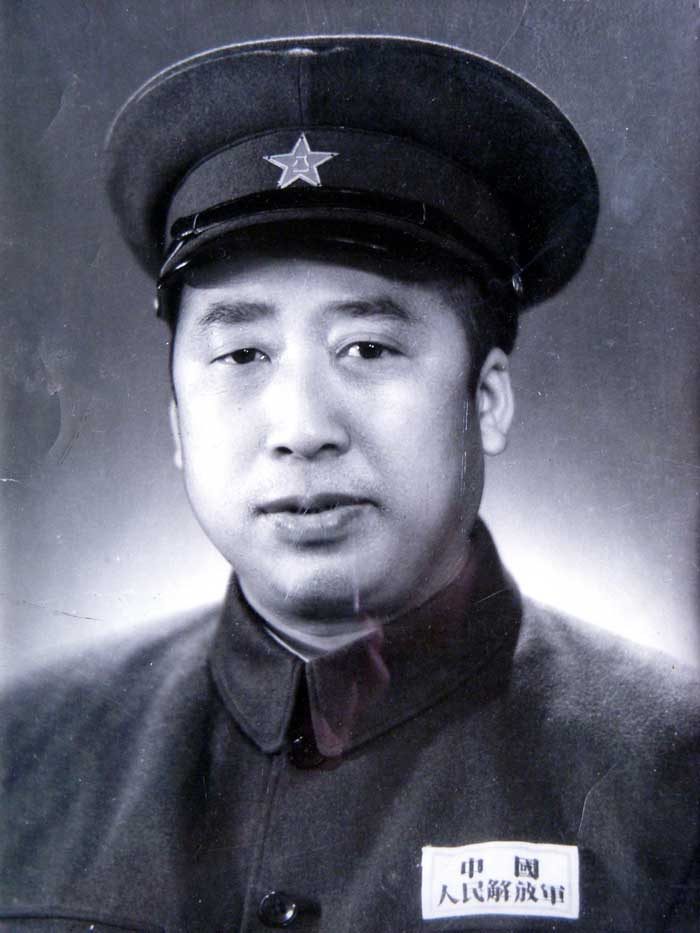
Teng Daiyuan wearing the Type 50 cadre uniform (wool fabric)

The accessories of the Type 50 uniform include badges, cap badges, and buttons.

== Type 50 badges ==
The Type 50 badges were the last cloth badges issued to the People's Liberation Army. They were red rectangular frames with the words "Chinese People's Liberation Army" written inside. (The Chinese People's Volunteer Army in the Korean War used different words.)

=== Cap badges ===
There were four types of Type 50 cap badges. The main pattern was the emblem of the Chinese People's Liberation Army. The cap badges for Army and Navy soldiers were separate August 1st Army emblems. The Air Force emblem had wing-shaped decorations added to both sides of the August 1st Army emblem. The August 1st cap badge for Navy officers was teardrop-shaped with a blue background and an anchor in the background. The anchor was either white or bronze. (The cap badges for senior officers were made of bronze and gilded.)

=== Buttons ===
Army uniform buttons often feature pine branches and wheat ears as decorative patterns, while navy buttons add an anchor to this design. Air Force buttons, on the other hand, feature the August 1st Five-Star Flying Eagle with double wings. (Gold buttons are for dress uniforms, while brown buttons are for service uniforms.)
