= Jiren =

Jiren could refer to:

- Jiren (Dragon Ball), a fictional extraterrestrial being in Dragon Ball
- Jiren, Ethiopia, a village in Oromia Region, Ethiopia
- Feng Jiren (1912–1996), Chinese writer
- Liu Jiren, Chinese CEO
