= Petra Amorós Domaica =

Spanish illustrator and embroidery scholar

- Born: c. 1895; Seville, Spain
- Died: c. 1952; Madrid, Spain
- Occupations: Illustrator, scholar of embroidery

Petra Amorós Domaica (c. 1895 – c. 1952) was a Spanish illustrator and scholar of the technique and history of Spanish embroidery.

== Life and career ==
Amorós Domaica was born in Seville, the daughter of Antonio Amorós Díaz, a comptroller at the Royal Tobacco Factory in Seville, and Petra Domaica. Her parents had seven children.

After her father's death in 1918, the family moved to Madrid. Her first published model drawings appeared in late 1926 in the magazine Blanco y Negro, in the section "La mujer y la casa" ("The Woman and the House"). Her contributions included simple embroidery patterns for children's clothing, ethnic motifs and lingerie, as well as literary descriptions of historical and ehnic embroidery accompanied by photographs and sample drawings. She also published in other periodicals, including La Revista de Oro, where she described older embroideries and commented critically on their execution and artistic value.

Her drawings in Blanco y Negro were noted for their clarity and were accompanied by detailed instructions. She also contributed designs for cushions and decorative borders to El hogar y la moda. In the August 1935 issue of Labores del hogar, she designed the cover, the back cover and two interior plates;; in November of the same year, she produced another back cover.

In January 1939, she was listed as a typist in the Purchasing Section of the General Inspectorate of Supply in Madrid.. After the end of the Spanish Civil War, she went to France and returned to Spain in 1941.

== Exhibitions ==
In 2019, her work was included in the exhibition Dibujantas, pioneras de la ilustración at Museo ABC.
