= Wu Yue =

Wu Yue may refer to:

- Wuyue, a 10th-century kingdom during the Five Dynasties and Ten Kingdoms period
- Sacred Mountains of China, also known as "Wu Yue" ("Five Mountains") in Chinese
- Wuyue (month), the fifth month of the Chinese calendar

== People ==
- Wu Yue (actor) (born 1976), Chinese male actor
- Wu Yue (actress) (born 1976), Chinese actress
- Wu Yue (swimmer) (born 1997), Chinese swimmer
- Wu Yue (table tennis) (born 1990), American table tennis player

== Other uses ==
- Wu (state) and Yue (state), two ancient states during the Spring and Autumn and Warring States periods
- Wu (region), also known as Wuyue, a Chinese region in Jiangsu and Zhejiang provinces
- Speakers of Wu Chinese, also known as Wuyue people, a subgroup of Han Chinese in the Wu region
- Wuyue culture

== See also ==
- Wu Yu (disambiguation)
