= Bruce Humes =

American literary translator and critic

Bruce Humes (born in 1955) is an American literary translator and critic of Chinese literature, specialising in non-Han authors and their works.

== Life ==
Humes grew up on Chicago's North Shore and in Sewickley, outside Pittsburgh, and had an early interest in languages, teaching himself elementary Latin, and learning German from his mother (who had a PhD in 20th-century French literature). He started studying anthropology at the University of Pennsylvania, but after a year abroad at the Sorbonne, switched to oriental studies. In 1978 he moved to Taipei to study Mandarin. His first jobs were working in a UN-hosted camp for Vietnamese refugees, and then working for a trade magazine publisher, both in Hong Kong. From 1994 to 2013 he was based in China, first in Shanghai, then in Shenzhen.

Wei Hui's Shanghai Baby was the first novel he translated from Chinese. As a foreigner living in China, he began to wonder what life was like for Chinese citizens who were not of the majority ethnic group, Han. He decided to explore writing by and about non-Han peoples and launched his blog, Ethnic ChinaLit in 2009 (subsequently renamed Altaic Storytelling, and now Fei Piao). He left China in 2013 to study Turkish in Istanbul. He is a regular contributor to the Chinese literature website Paper Republic.

== Translations ==
Novels

- Shanghai Baby - by Wei Hui
- The Last Quarter of the Moon - by Chi Zijian
- Confessions of a Jade Lord - by Alat Asem
- Is He My Son? - by Lin Chang

Short stories

- Doomsday, May, 2013 - from 末日, by Han Shaogong
- Sidik Golden Moboff - from 斯迪克金子关机, by Alat Asem
- Back Quarters at Number Seven - from 后罩楼, by Ye Guangqin
- Green Tara - from 绿度母, by Tsering Norbu
