= Chinese Literature (magazine) =

Chinese literary magazine

- Categories: Chinese literature
- First issue: 1951
- Final issue: 2000
- Company: Foreign Languages Press
- Country: China
- Based in: Beijing
- ISSN: 0009-4617

Chinese Literature, in some years Chinese Literature: Fiction, Poetry, Art, was an English-language literary magazine of Chinese literature in translation. It was founded in 1951 by Yeh Chun-chan (叶君健), Sidney Shapiro, Yang Xianyi, and Gladys Yang. The headquarters was in Beijing. In 1956, Chinese Literature was incorporated into the state-run Foreign Languages Press. Publication ceased in 2000, but newer contents appeared on its website for a time.

Chinese Literature focused on translations of classics by May Fourth authors, socialist realists, and Stalin Prize winners. Sidney Shapiro was one of the journal's editors and translator of works by authors like Mao Dun and Zhao Shuli.

The magazine ran quarterly from 1951 to 1957, bimonthly in 1958, monthly from 1959 to 1983, quarterly from 1984 to 1999, and bimonthly in 2000. Over 2000 writers and artists were featured in the issues.

== See also ==
- Pathlight (magazine)
- Renditions (magazine)
