= China Internet Information Center =

State-run news website of the People's Republic of China

- Native name: 中国互联网新闻中心
- Website type: Government web portal
- Founded: December 12, 2000; 25 years ago
- Owners: State Council Information Office; China International Communications Group
- Editor: Wang Xiaohui
- Website: www.china.org.cn
- Commercial: No

China Internet Information Center (Chinese: 中国互联网新闻中心; pinyin: Zhōngguó Hùliánwǎng Xīnwén Zhōngxīn) is a state-run web portal of the People's Republic of China's State Council Information Office and the China International Communications Group, both part of the Publicity Department of the Chinese Communist Party.

== History ==
The China Internet Information Center was launched on December 12, 2000. In 2018, Wang Xiaohui, who also served as a vice minister of the Central Propaganda Department of the Chinese Communist Party, became its editor-in-chief.

During the Gaza war, the China Internet Information Center was accused of repeating disinformation about Israel from Iran's Tasnim News Agency.

The China Internet Information Center regularly purchases ads on Twitter under the "China Says" mantra.

== See also ==
- Xinhua News Agency
- China News Service
- International communication center
