= Selected Works of Jiang Zemin =

Series of books written by Jiang Zemin

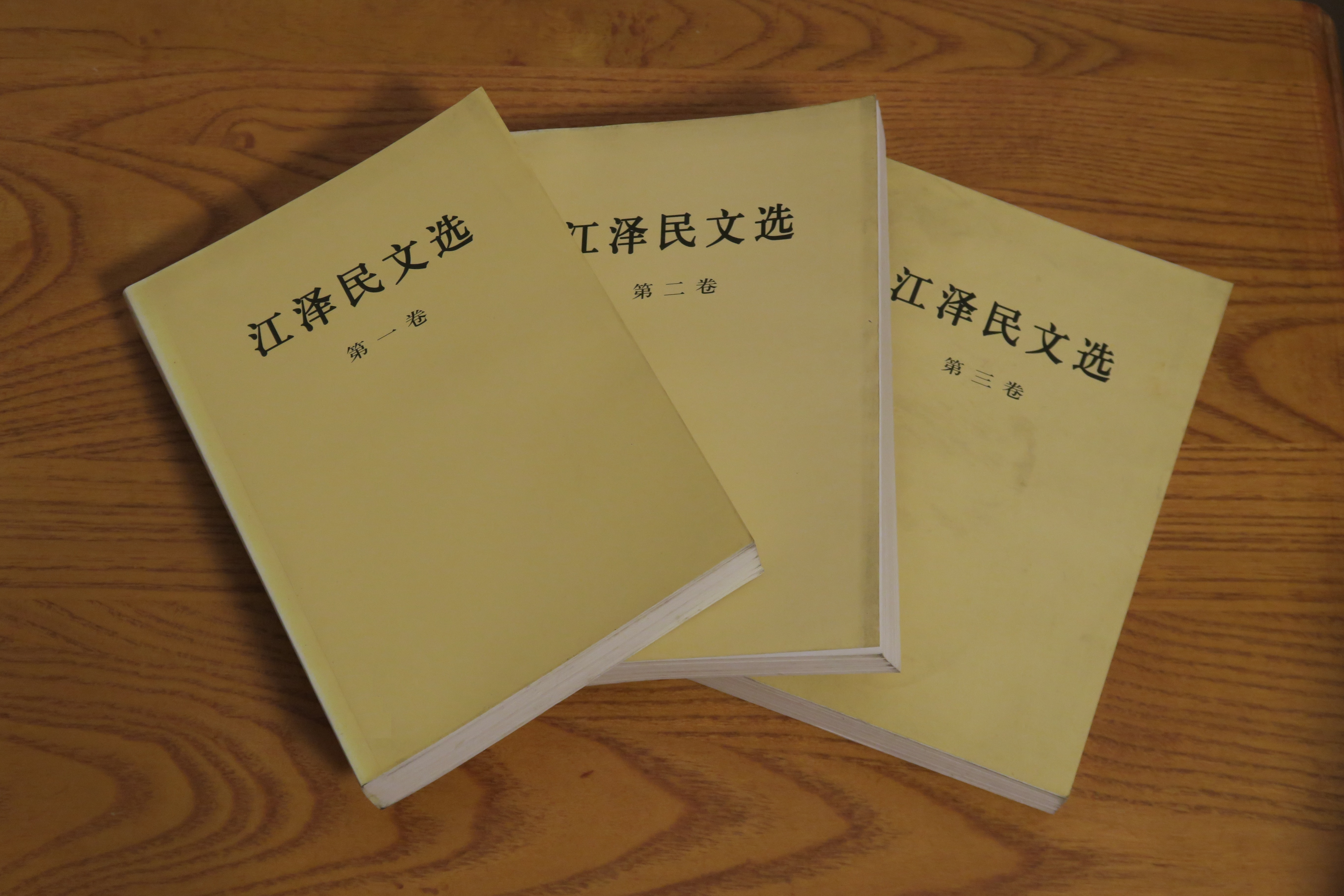
- The three volumes of Selected Works of Jiang Zemin
- Editors: Document Editing Committee of the CCP Central Committee
- Author: Jiang Zemin
- Original title: 江泽民文选
- Language: Mandarin Chinese
- Genre: Politics
- Publisher: People's Publishing House
- Publication date: August 10, 2006
- Publication place: Mainland China
- Media type: Print (Hardcover, Paperback)
- Pages: 660 (V.I), 591 (V.II), 608 (V.III)
- ISBN: 7-01-005674-9 (Vol. I)

Selected Works of Jiang Zemin
- Simplified Chinese: 江泽民文选
- Traditional Chinese: 江澤民文選
Transcriptions
Standard Mandarin
- Hanyu Pinyin: Jiāng Zémín Wénxuǎn

Abbreviation
- Simplified Chinese: 江选
- Traditional Chinese: 江選
Transcriptions
Standard Mandarin
- Hanyu Pinyin: Jiāngxuǎn

The Selected Works of Jiang Zemin (Chinese: 江泽民文选) is a collection of 203 articles from 1980 to 2004, including speeches, conversation records, letters, instructions, and inscriptions, written by Jiang Zemin, the general secretary of the Chinese Communist Party from 1989 to 2002.

The book was edited by the CCP Central Committee's Document Editing Committee and published by People's Publishing Houses in various places; it was sold in Xinhua Bookstores at the county level and above from August 10, 2006. The Selected Works of Jiang Zemin consists of three volumes, with four formats: special hardcover, hardcover, large paperback, and popular edition, printed on 60g double-sided offset paper in small 32-page format.

== Overview ==
The first volume contains 81 articles, ranging from "Establishing Special Economic Zones and Accelerating Economic Development" (Report of the 15th Session of the Standing Committee of the Fifth National People's Congress) on August 21, 1980, to "Rebuilding a Northwest Region with Beautiful Mountains and Rivers" (Instructions) on August 5, 1997.

The second volume contains 59 articles, from "Hold high the great banner of Deng Xiaoping Theory and comprehensively advance the cause of building socialism with Chinese characteristics into the 21st century" (Political report of the 15th National Congress of the Chinese Communist Party) on September 12, 1997, to "Correctly guide the healthy growth of young people" (Speech at the meeting of the Standing Committee of the Political Bureau of the CCP Central Committee) on February 1, 2000.

The third volume contains 63 articles, ranging from "How to Better Implement the 'Three Represents' under New Historical Conditions" (a speech delivered in Guangdong Province) on February 25, 2000, to "My Heart Will Always Be with the People's Army" (a speech delivered at the enlarged meeting of the Central Military Commission) on September 20, 2004.

== Sales ==
The day before the release, the People's Daily published an editorial to congratulate the publication. On the morning of August 10, the day of the release, Xinhua Bookstores in provincial capitals held a grand release ceremony. The first batch of copies was quite large (100,000 copies in Fujian Province, Hubei Province, and Chongqing City, 200,000 copies in Shanghai and Jiangsu Province, 80,000 copies in Xinjiang, 50,000 copies in Liaoning Province, and 30,000 copies in Guangdong Province; the first print run of the popular edition was 300,000 copies nationwide). Small outlets also placed the anthology in a prominent position among the books. As the government led the majority of cadres in enthusiastically purchasing the anthology, there was a constant demand for group orders, creating a huge demand. Within two days of the release, there was a need for additional printing.

=== Translations ===
In May 2008, the thread-bound edition of Selected Works of Jiang Zemin (three volumes) was published in mainland China, using traditional Chinese characters in large vertical format.

In November 2008, the China National Language Translation Bureau completed the translation of Selected Works of Jiang Zemin into seven minority languages. Volumes 1 to 3 of Selected Works of Jiang Zemin were published and distributed in seven minority languages including Mongolian, Tibetan, Uyghur, Kazakh, Korean, Yi, and Zhuang in mainland China.

The book is also available in five foreign language versions: English, French, Russian, Spanish, and Japanese. It was translated by the Compilation and Translation Bureau of the CCP Central Committee and published in volumes. The first volume was published on February 24, 2010, the second volume was published on February 18, 2012, and the third volume was published on February 3, 2013.

== Reception ==
On February 3, 2007, the People’s Daily published an editorial titled "Deepen the Study of Selected Works of Jiang Zemin", which stated: "Selected Works of Jiang Zemin is the best textbook for studying the important thought of the ‘Three Represents’."

== See also ==
- Selected Works of Mao Tse-Tung
- Selected Works of Hu Jintao
