= Shanyaotan School =

Chinese literary movement

The Shanyaotan School (simplified Chinese: 山药蛋派; traditional Chinese: 山藥蛋派), a contemporary Chinese literary movement, is also known as the Shanxi School, the Zhao Shuli School, or the Huohua School (Spark School). Beginning in the 1940s, this literary school was formed by writers from Shanxi, represented by Zhao Shuli. They focused on depicting rural life, characterized by a colloquial and engaging storytelling style. They advocated for a nationalistic and popular artistic style in their portrayal of rural life.

== History ==
In the 1940s, a group of writers including Ma Feng and Xi Rong, influenced by Mao Zedong's "Talks at the Yan'an Forum on Literature and Art" and the "Zhao Shuli Direction," consciously emulated Zhao Shuli's writing style. Centered around Zhao Shuli, they gradually formed a distinct literary school.By the mid-1950s, many of these writers returned to Shanxi Province, where they assumed prominent leadership roles within the provincial literary and art circles. Concurrently, in July 1956, Zhou Yang, a leading figure in Chinese cultural policy, advocated for the conscious development of literary schools in Shanxi, marking the genesis of the "Shanyaotan School" . The school officially took shape in June 1958, when the 11th issue of Wenyi Bao featured a "Special Shanxi Literary Collection," integrating Zhao Shuli within the broader group of Shanxi writers.

In 1979, Li Guotao formally coined the term "Shanyaotan School" in an article published in Guangming Daily. This designation, which translates to "Potato School," was inspired by the group's profound connection to everyday life and their strong local flavor, reminiscent of the potatoes abundantly cultivated in Shanxi.

== Representative authors ==
- Zhao Shuli
- Ma Feng
- Xi Rong
- Sun Qian
- Li Shuwei
