= Selected Works of Hu Jintao =

Series of books written by Hu Jintao

- Editors: Document Editing Committee of the CCP Central Committee
- Author: Hu Jintao
- Original title: 胡锦涛文选
- Language: Mandarin Chinese
- Genre: Politics
- Publisher: People's Publishing House
- Publication date: September 20, 2016
- Publication place: Mainland China
- Media type: Print (Hardcover, Paperback)
- Pages: 568 (V.I), 658 (V.II), 660 (V.III)

Selected Works of Hu Jintao
- Simplified Chinese: 胡锦涛文选
- Traditional Chinese: 胡錦濤文選
Transcriptions
Standard Mandarin
- Hanyu Pinyin: Hú Jǐntāo Wénxuǎn

The Selected Works of Hu Jintao (Chinese: 胡锦涛文选) is a collection of 242 articles from June 1988 to November 2012, including reports, speeches, talks, articles, letters, and instructions, delivered by Hu Jintao the general secretary of the Chinese Communist Party from 2002 to 2012. It was edited by the Central Committee of the Chinese Communist Party Document Editing Committee and published by local People's Publishing Houses. It was distributed nationwide from September 20, 2016.

== Content ==
This book collects Hu Jintao's representative and original works from June 1988 to November 2012, including 242 reports, speeches, talks, articles, letters, instructions, etc. A large part of them are published for the first time. There are also topics worthy of attention, including the Tibet issue, the SARS epidemic, and the handling of Xinjiang riots. The book is divided into three volumes, and the specific contents of each volume are as follows:

- The first volume contains 74 articles, ranging from Hu Jintao's speech at the Bijie Development Poverty Alleviation and Ecological Construction Experimental Zone Work Conference in Guizhou Province on June 8, 1988, “Establishing the Bijie Development Poverty Alleviation and Ecological Construction Experimental Zone” to Hu Jintao's speech at the Central Party School's Autumn Opening Ceremony on September 2, 2002, “Welcoming the 16th National Congress of the Chinese Communist Party with Solid Work”. All of them were written by Hu Jintao during his tenure in Guizhou, Tibet, and the Secretariat of the CCP Central Committee.
- The second volume contains 82 articles, ranging from Hu Jintao's speech during his study tour in Xibaipo on December 6, 2002, to Hu Jintao's report at the 17th National Congress of the Chinese Communist Party on October 15, 2007, “Hold high the great banner of socialism with Chinese characteristics and strive for new victories in building a moderately prosperous society in all respects”. All of them were written by Hu Jintao during his tenure as General Secretary of the 16th CCP Central Committee.
- The third volume consists of 86 articles, ranging from Hu Jintao's speech at the seminar for new members and alternate members of the Central Committee on learning and implementing the spirit of the 17th CCP National Congress on December 17, 2007, entitled “Deeply Study and Understand the Scientific Outlook on Development”, to Hu Jintao's report at the 18th CCP National Congress on November 8, 2012, entitled “Resolutely Advance Along the Road of Socialism with Chinese Characteristics and Strive to Completely Build a Moderately Prosperous Society”. All of them were written by Hu Jintao during his tenure as General Secretary of the 17th CCP Central Committee.

== Release ==
The Selected Works of Hu Jintao was published nationwide on September 20, 2016, and was available for sale at Xinhua Bookstores in counties (districts) and above. The printing work in each first-level administrative region was handled by the People's Publishing House of each first-level administrative region.

=== Translations ===
In December 2020, the China National Ethnic Languages Translation Bureau organized the translation of seven minority language versions of Selected Works of Hu Jintao. The first three volumes of Selected Works of Hu Jintao were published and distributed in seven minority language versions, including Mongolian, Tibetan, Uyghur, Kazakh, Korean, Yi, and Zhuang, in mainland China.

In December 2019, the thread-bound edition of Selected Works of Hu Jintao (three volumes) was published in mainland China, using traditional Chinese characters in large vertical format.

== See also ==
- Selected Works of Mao Tse-Tung
- Selected Works of Jiang Zemin
