= China Today =

Chinese Communist Party magazine

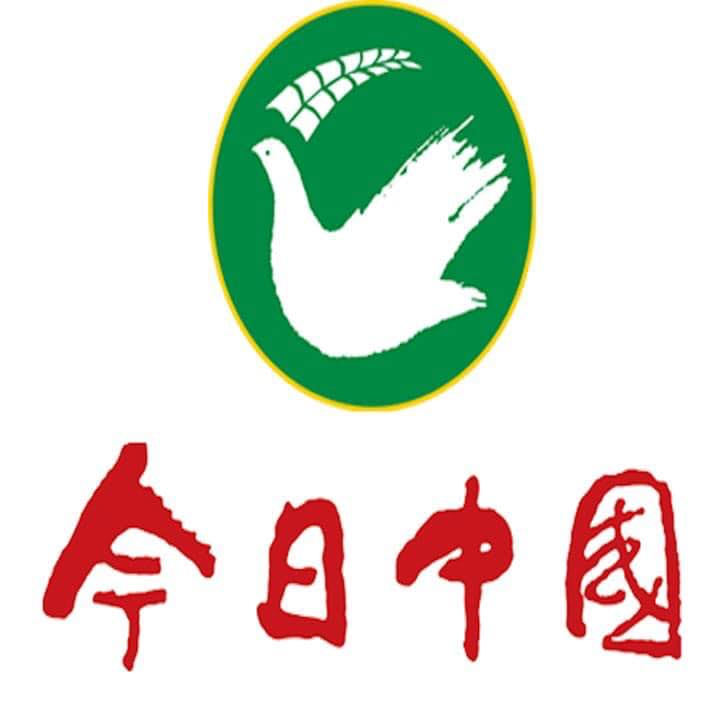
- Publisher: China International Communications Group
- Founder: Soong Ching-ling
- Founded: 1952; 74 years ago
- Country: China
- Website: www.chinatoday.com.cn/ctenglish/

China Today (Chinese: 今日中国; pinyin: jīnrì Zhōngguó), until 1990 titled China Reconstructs (Chinese: 中国建设; pinyin: Zhōngguó jiànshè), is a monthly magazine founded in 1952 by Soong Ching-ling in association with Israel Epstein.

It is published in Chinese language, English, Spanish, French, Arabic, German and Turkish, and is an official outlet of the Chinese Communist Party, intended to promote knowledge of China's culture, geography, economy and social affairs as well as positive view of the People's Republic of China and its government to people outside of China.

== History ==
China Reconstructs was founded in 1952 by Soong Ching-ling in association with foreign advisor and naturalized Chinese citizen Israel Epstein. Soong intended for China Reconstructs to engage readers and intellectuals in the capitalist countries who might not be politically progressive, but who "pursued world peace." Israel Epstein was editor-in-chief of China Today from 1948, and later returned to China at the request of Soong Ching-ling. It was published via Foreign Languages Press.

The magazine was renamed China Today in 1990.

== Content ==
China Today is published in Chinese language, English, Spanish, French, Arabic, German and Turkish, and is an official outlet of the Chinese Communist Party, intended to promote knowledge of China's culture, geography, economy and social affairs as well as positive view of the People's Republic of China and its government to people outside of China. It is usually published the first week of the month. The editors usually showcase what they characterize as the growing modernization and development which has happened in China since 1949.
