= Fengzi =

Chinese actress

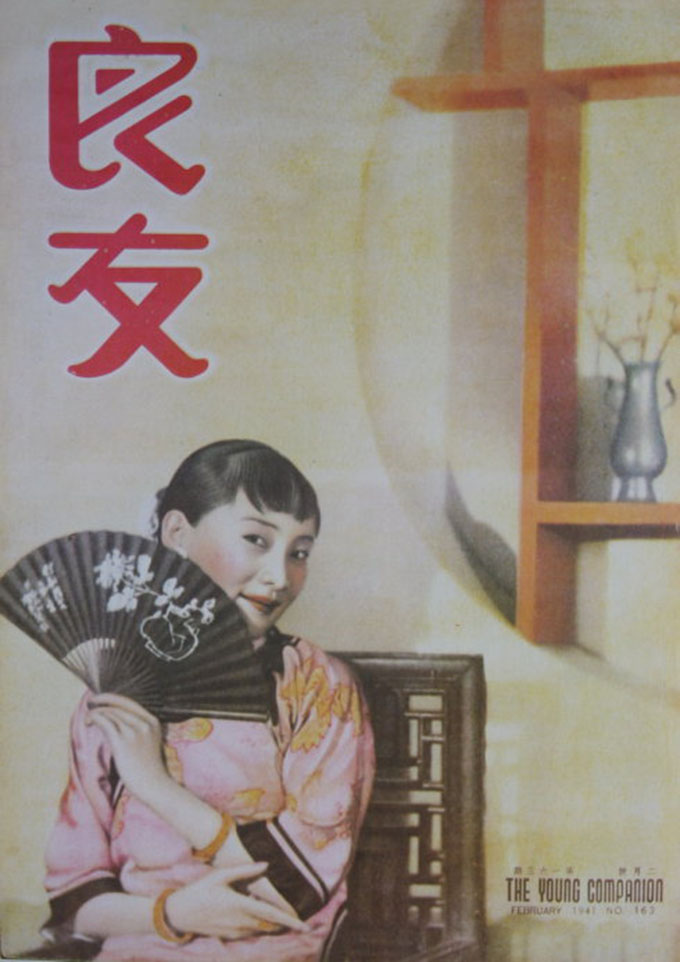
- Fengzi on the cover of The Young Companion (February 1941)
- Born: Feng Jiren; August 11, 1912; Hankou, Hubei, Republic of China
- Died: January 21, 1996 (aged 83); Beijing, People's Republic of China
- Education: Fudan University
- Spouses: Sun Yufen; Sidney Shapiro (m. 1948–1996)

Chinese name
- Traditional Chinese: 鳳子
- Simplified Chinese: 凤子
Transcriptions
Standard Mandarin
- Hanyu Pinyin: Fèngzǐ

Birth name
- Chinese: 封季壬
Transcriptions
Standard Mandarin
- Hanyu Pinyin: Fēng Jìrén

Feng Jiren (11 August 1912 – 21 January 1996), known professionally as Fengzi (formerly romanized as Fung Tzu), also known as Feng Fengzi, was a Chinese actress, writer, literary editor, and dramatist. Her second husband was the American-born translator Sidney Shapiro.

In the 1940s, Fengzi did underground work for the Chinese Communist Party in Shanghai while also working as an actress (in leftist plays and films) and literary editor (for leftist magazines). She was almost arrested by the Nationalist government, but managed to escape to Beiping. In the Korean War, she briefly went to Korea with the People's Volunteer Army. During the Cultural Revolution, due to having worked with Jiang Qing in the 1930s (when Jiang Qing was an actress), Fengzi was severely persecuted and detained for 4 years. She was rehabilitated after the Cultural Revolution.

One of her short stories, "The Portrait" (畫像), written in 1947, has been translated into English by Ann Huss.

== Filmography ==
Year	English title	Original title	Role	Notes
1940	My Motherland	白雲故鄉	Chen Jingfen	
1948	Spring Couldn't Be Locked	關不住的春光	Mei Chunhua	
