= Wu Yu =

Wu Yu may refer to:

- Wu Yu (boxer) (born 1995), Chinese boxer
- Wu Yu (Song dynasty) (c. 1100–1154), Chinese philologist and phonologist
- Wu Yu (speed skater) (born 1997), Chinese speed skater

== See also ==
- Wu Yue (disambiguation)
