= Philippe Picquier Publishing =

French publishing house

The Éditions Philippe Picquier is a French publishing house. It specializes in books coming from Far East, i.e., translated books coming from China, Korea, Japan, Vietnam, India, Taiwan, and Pakistan.

The house does not stick to a specific domain, proposing encompassing literature, human sciences, essays, children's literature, comic strip, beautiful books..., because it is in question for the publisher “to create links between the genres".

Éditions Philipe Picquier is distributed in France by Harmonia Mundi which sells their works in Harmonia Mundi in Paris. They have branches in Belgium, Switzerland, and Canada. Located in Arles, the company employs nine staff. The publisher shares premises with Harmonia Mundi.

== History ==
Philippe Picquier, founded the publishing company despite not knowing any Asian language. He serves as the company's CEO. He decided to venture into publishing after a chance meeting: "publishing is like life, everything is question of meetings [...] and a real publishing house, that is that: a permanent meeting place." Focusing originally on Chinese and Japanese literature, he widened his literary horizon to encompass East Asia, with the idea that "Asia is huge enough so that we take care only of it."

Since 1993, following money troubles, Harmonia Mundi holds 60% of the assets, while leaving at Philippe Picquier part of its general services. In 2010 The magazine Livre Hebdo reached 122nd position in French publishers.

== Catalog ==
Picquier accepts all genres from Asia. The house publishes 1210 titles in its catalog. The backlist contains more than 350 works. Dominique Picquier, Philippe's sister, is a famous book designer. Her covers guarantee catalog coherence, and reinforce the editorial policy.

Among Picquier's works are Memoirs of a Geisha by Yuki Inoue, Memoirs of a Eunuch in the Forbidden City by Dan Shi, and Coin Locker Babies by Ryū Murakami. Each of these titles had production runs of more than 40,000 copies.

=== Adult ===
The adult collections department is dedicated to human sciences, proposing works of theology, documentaries, historical, and ethnology. They offer studies of the life, of the behavior and of the civilization of these countries. Beautiful books are also present, including photography, painting, and cookbooks.

Among graphic arts, the house offers comic strips and manga.

The essays it publishes consider literature, art, Asian thought, and history.

The house catalog offers to a wide choice of novels (literary or popular), crime novels, and historical novels. Picquier also developed a domain dedicated to eroticism, in a collection named "Du pavillon des corps curieux". Biographies and testimonies present strong personalities of writers, including countries like China.

=== Youth ===
In 2003, Éditions Philippe Picquier created its Picquier Jeunesse youth catalog. “Tales, poetry, illustrated book, childhood and teen narratives, at youngs to the teenagers, to laugh or think, to question or have fun, they also show the reader and culture vitality. Here is thus a new collection of books to pass through the borders to the children and to discover Asia with new eyes.” These enlarge its readership with illustrated books, novels and sagas in several volumes.
