= Zhao Shuli =

Chinese writer (1906–1970)

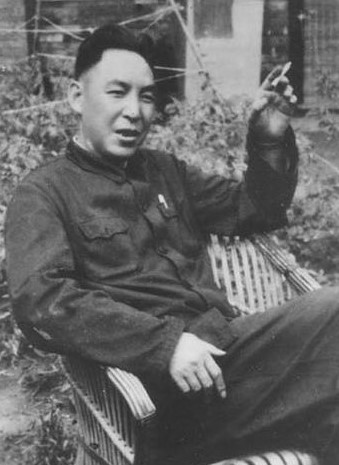
- Born: 24 September 1906 Qinshui, Shanxi, Qing dynasty
- Died: 23 September 1970 (aged 63) Taiyuan, Shanxi, China
- Language: Chinese
- Notable works: The Marriage of Young Blacky; The Rhymes of Li Youcai
- Spouse: Ma Shuying(1922-1927); Guan Lianzhong(1931-1970)
- Children: The eldest son: Zhao Dahu; The eldest daughter: Zhao Guangjian; The second son: Zhao Erhu; The third son: Zhao Sanhu

Zhao Shuli (simplified Chinese: 赵树理; traditional Chinese: 趙樹理; pinyin: Zhào Shùlǐ; Wade–Giles: Chao Shu-li; 24 September 1906 – 23 September 1970) was a novelist and a leading figure of modern Chinese literature. He died in 1970, following persecutions during the Cultural Revolution.

== Biography ==
=== Background ===
Zhao was born in 1906 in Qinshui County, Shanxi Province. He was originally called 趙樹禮, which, in Mandarin Chinese, was a homophone of the name he later adopted in his adult career. Zhao's family was declining gentry, and owned land on which his father worked. Zhao's family members were adherents of late-imperial era sectarian religions, including the Three Sages Sect and the Pure Tea Sect.

=== Early life and career ===
Zhao read widely at a young age, including the Confucian classics, divination books, and Three Sages Sect scriptures. Growing up, he was a talented musician in the village opera band. At age 19 in the Changzhi Provincial Normal School, he learned about May Fourth literature and began reading even more broadly, including Ming-Qing vernacular fiction, Lu Xun, Henrik Ibsen, and Ivan Turgenev.

Zhao experimented with writing in the May Fourth style of "new fiction," but found village audiences preferred more traditional forms. This prompted him to advocate political and social change through writing in traditional literary forms.

At age 21, he developed his opposition to practices deemed superstitious and abandoned his former vegetarianism (which was a tenet of the Three Sages Sect).

He attended a teachers college and went on to teach in primary schools.

In 1937, Zhao joined the Communist-led Sacrifice League and in 1939 became a Communist cultural worker.

=== Prominent writings ===
Zhao's major fictional works include 小二黑結婚 Xiao Erhei jiehun, "The Marriage of Young Blacky"; 李有才板話 Li Youcai banhua, "The Rhymes of Li Youcai"; 李家莊的變遷 Li jiazhuang de bianqian, "Change Comes to Li Family Village"; and 三里灣 Sanliwan, "Sanliwan Village". The action of Zhao's novels typically takes place in the countryside of Northern China. In this setting, Zhao explores the dilemmas and conflicts of villagers who are facing growing social upheaval. Zhao was renowned for achieving nuanced portrayals of the diverse cast of human characters which were to be found in provincial life. Zhao became known as a leader of the Shanyaotan (White Potato) School (山藥蛋派), one of the most influential literary movements in mid-20th century China.

Zhao first became a prominent literary figure as a result of his 1943 short story, "The Marriage of Young Blacky." The story's protagonist (Young Blacky) and Xiaoqin pursue the style of free choice marriage promoted by the Communists. In doing so, they overcome abuses of authority by some village cadres and the authority of their parents. Zhao used colloquial peasant language, traditional storytelling techniques, and dramatic narratives in the text. "The Marriage of Young Blacky" was initially not used by the Communist Party press, and was published after Peng Dehuai praised it, noting, "It is rare to see such an easy-to-understand story that comes from the masses. Upon publication, it became an instant hit among the rural population in the Mount Taihang region. The story became influential and resulted in other adaptations, including in theatre and cinema.

=== Politics ===
In 1946, the Chinese Communist Party praised Zhao as a model of peasant writers. His works were promoted as an ideal combination of political education with popular entertainment, and the Communist Party distributed them to local cadres and urged Communist writers and artists to follow the "Zhao Shuli direction".

Zhao was a member of the executive committee of the Chinese Writers Association and also served as the director of the Society of Chinese Authors, the president of the Society of Chinese Poets, and an editor of the journals 曲藝 Quyi (Performing Arts) and 人民文學 Renmin Wenxue (People's Literature). He was also appointed a delegate to the 8th National Congress of the Chinese Communist Party, and a deputy in the first, second, and third sessions of the National People's Congress.

Zhao's works passed in and out of political favor at various times. Among the criticisms of his works was that they depicted peasant characters who were "in-the-middle" rather than heroes.

During the Cultural Revolution, Zhao was persecuted and tortured. He died on 23 September 1970.
