= Museo ABC =

Museum of drawing and graphic design in Madrid

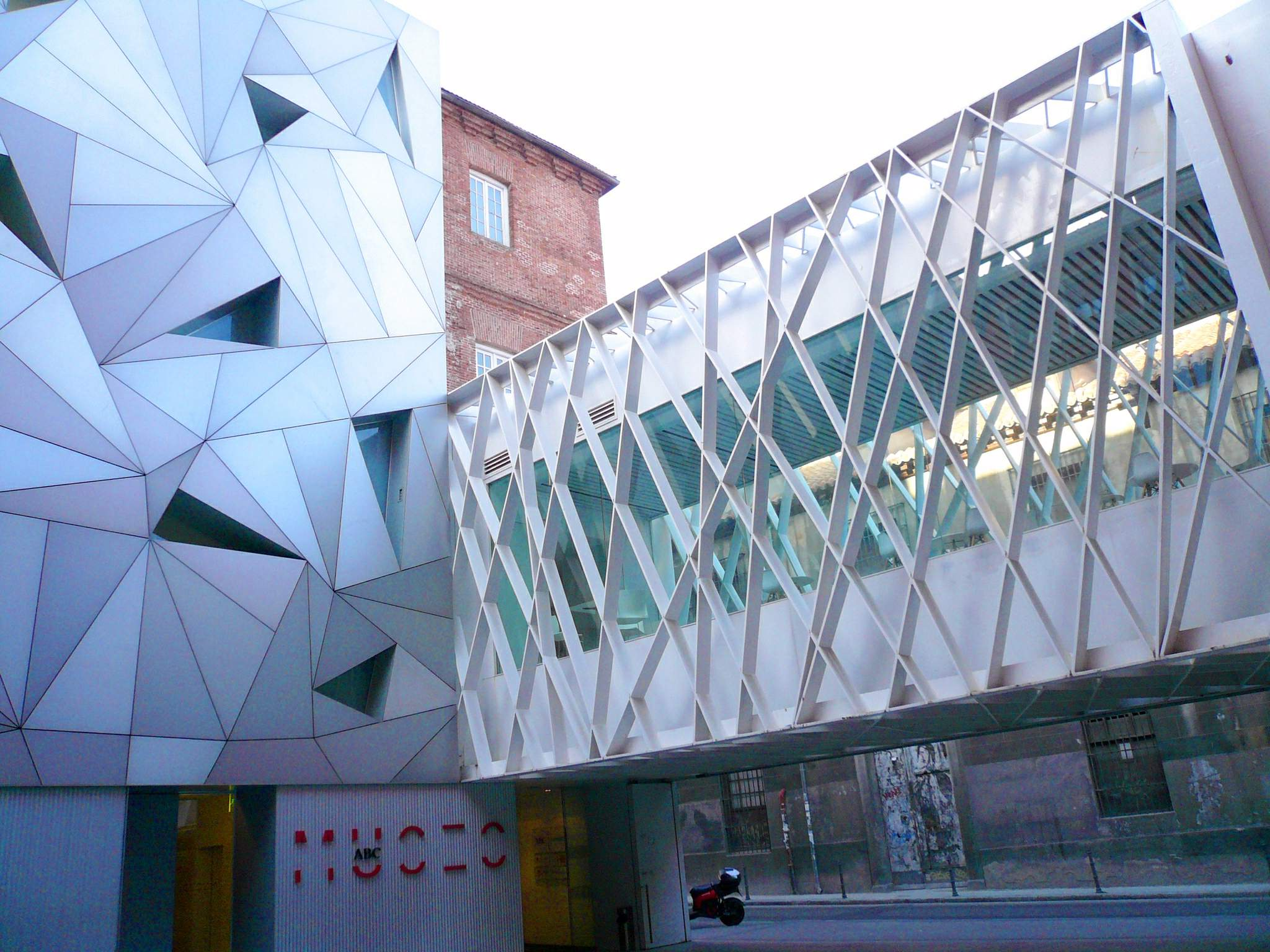
- Museo ABC, Madrid
- Established: 2010
- Location: Madrid, Spain
- Coordinates: 40.4278°N 3.7097°W
- Type: Art museum
- Website: museo.abc.es

Museo ABC is a museum in Madrid, Spain, dedicated to drawing and illustration.

The museum is housed in a converted brewery. The privately funded museum was established in 2010. Its collection includes over 200,000 items from the Spanish daily newspaper ABC, which began collecting examples of drawing and graphic illustration in 1891.
