= New World Press =

Publishing house based in Beijing, China

- Founded: 1966
- Country of origin: China
- Headquarters location: 24 Baiwanzhuang Lu, Beijing, China
- Official website: www.nwp.com.cn

New World Press (NWP) (Chinese: 新世界出版社; pinyin: Xīn Shìjiè Chūbǎnshè) is a Beijing-based Chinese publishing house. New World Press has published more than 5000 titles, publishing exclusively in foreign languages including English before 1997, and exclusively in Chinese after 2002.

== History ==
New World Press was established in 1966 as a subsidiary of Foreign Languages Press (FLP), and became independent from FLP in 1986, though both were owned by China International Publishing Group (CIPG). In 2001, a major decision by CIPG resulted in some publishers like Chinese Literature Press merging with NWP, and NWP published only Chinese books thereafter.
