= Beijing Review =

Multi-language Chinese news magazine

- Peking Review front page from 13 October 1959
- Type: Weekly
- Publisher: China International Publishing Group
- Founded: March 1958
- Political alignment: Chinese Communist Party
- Language: English, Japanese, French, German, Chinese, and Spanish
- Headquarters: Beijing
- Website: www.bjreview.com

Beijing Review
- Simplified Chinese: 北京周报
- Traditional Chinese: 北京周報
Transcriptions
Standard Mandarin
- Hanyu Pinyin: Běijīng Zhōubào
- Wade–Giles: Pei3-ching1 Chou1-pao4

Beijing Review (simplified Chinese: 北京周报; traditional Chinese: 北京周報; pinyin: Běijīng Zhōubào; lit. 'Beijing Weekly'), previously Peking Review, is China's only national news magazine in English, published by the state-run China International Publishing Group. In addition to the English print edition, Beijing Review also publishes online editions in Chinese, French, German and Japanese.

== Overview ==
Following China’s participation in the 1954 Geneva Conference, Premier Zhou Enlai, on his way back with the delegation, suggested establishing an English-language weekly, as the country’s growing international engagement made its main foreign publicity publication, then bi-weekly People’s China, inadequate and untimely.

Wu Wentao, who had served as People’s Daily’s chief correspondent in Geneva during the conference, returned to China the following year and began preparations for such a weekly. In late 1957, as deputy head of the Foreign Languages Press, Wu formally submitted a proposal to the Ministry of Foreign Affairs to launch the English weekly. On 18 November 1957, Vice Foreign Minister Zhang Wentian convened discussions and subsequently submitted a report for the Premier’s approval. The proposal was endorsed by Foreign Minister Chen Yi on 20 November 1957 for Zhou’s consideration. In early 1958, Zhou approved the launch and instructed the Foreign Ministry to provide support; his final authorization on 9 February 1958 set 1 March 1958 as the publication date of the English-language Peking Review.

Replacing the English edition of People’s China, whose editorial team it largely inherited, Peking Review served as an important channel for the Chinese government to communicate with the rest of the world. The first issue included an editor's note explaining that the magazine was meant to "provide timely, accurate, first-hand information on economic, political and cultural developments in China, and her relations with the rest of the world." The U.S. Postal Service initially restricted distribution of the magazine but the U.S. Supreme Court overturned this policy in Lamont v. Postmaster General in 1965.

In 1963, Peking Review launched Spanish, French, Japanese, and German editions. The magazine also published an Indonesian edition in the mid-1960s, followed by Arabic and Portuguese editions in the late 1970s. With the exception of the English edition, all foreign-language print editions ceased publication in 2000 and subsequently continued online.

From 1967 onward, Peking Review was significantly disrupted by the Cultural Revolution. In 1967, Mao Zedong and Zhou Enlai criticized the magazine and other external propaganda outlets for overly heavy-handed messaging influenced by Cultural Revolution rhetoric, urging restraint and humility in communication directed at international audiences. In 1969, most of the magazine’s staff were sent to participate in labor and political re-education at the May Seventh Cadre Schools.

In 1971, to flee the political turmoil, Jack I-Fan Chen, son of Eugene Chen and then an editor of Peking Review, left China with his wife and son for the United States with Zhou Enlai’s arrangement, officially to conduct external publicity work. Chen, who held a British passport, was among the only politically connected figures from China to emigrate during the Cultural Revolution, and later advised U.S. President Richard Nixon ahead of his 1972 visit to China.

In 1973, at the invitation of the American Society of Newspaper Editors, Wang Xi, the deputy editor-in-chief of Peking Review, among a delegation of Chinese newspeople led by Zhu Muzhi, head of Xinhua News Agency, visited the United States. The delegation was received by Richard Nixon and later visited Canada, where it met Prime Minister Pierre Trudeau.

In 1979, the magazine underwent major editorial and design reforms. While continuing to publish official documents and policy-related articles, it expanded original reporting, special features, and regular columns aimed at overseas readers. The English title was also changed from Peking Review to Beijing Review in line with the Chinese government's adoption of pinyin. In 1980, a delegation from Time magazine led by Henry Grunwald visited the publication.

During the Tiananmen protests of 1989, Beijing Review initially expressed sympathy for the student protesters. The magazine was subsequently placed under temporary supervision by Lin Wusun, head of the China International Publishing Group, and its coverage returned to the party line over the following year.

In October 2020, the United States Department of State designated Beijing Review as a "foreign mission" of China.
