= China International Communications Group =

Chinese foreign-language publisher

China International Communications Group 中国外文出版发行事业局 中国国际传播集团
- Parent company: Publicity Department of the Chinese Communist Party
- Status: Active
- Founded: January 1949
- Founder: Soong Ching-ling
- Country of origin: China
- Headquarters location: Beijing
- Distribution: Worldwide
- Key people: Du Zhanyuan (Director)
- Publication types: Books, magazines and periodicals
- Official website: www.cicgcorp.com

China International Publishing Group
- Simplified Chinese: 中国国际出版集团
- Traditional Chinese: 中國國際出版集團
Transcriptions
Standard Mandarin
- Hanyu Pinyin: Zhōngguó Guójì Chūbǎn Jítuán

China Foreign Languages Publishing Administration
- Simplified Chinese: 中国外文出版发行事业局
- Traditional Chinese: 中國外文出版發行事業局
Transcriptions
Standard Mandarin
- Hanyu Pinyin: Zhōngguó Wàiwén Chūbǎn Fāxíng Shìyèjú

China International Communications Group (CICG) is a foreign-language publishing and communications organization headquartered in Beijing, and owned and operated by the Central Propaganda Department of the Chinese Communist Party (CCP). Established in October 1949 as the China International Publishing Group, it has developed into a global media corporation.

== Organization ==
CICG owns seven subordinate publishing houses, i.e. Foreign Languages Press, New World Press, Morning Glory Publishers, Sinolingua, China Pictorial Publishing House, Dolphin Books, and New Star Publishers. The organization annually publishes over 3,000 titles of books and around 50 journals in more than 10 languages. Notable periodicals include Beijing Review, China Today, China Pictorial, People’s China, and China Report. Its subsidiary, the China International Book Trading Corporation, is in charge of the distribution. It also operates the China Center for International Communication Development, established in 1988.

It runs 20 overseas branches in countries and regions, including the United States, Britain, Germany, Japan, Belgium, Egypt, Mexico, and the Hong Kong Special Administrative Region, with about 3,000 staff members, including around 100 foreign workers.

In addition to publishing, CICG operates the China Internet Information Center. It is also responsible for the implementation and management of the national translation test and appraisal for the Ministry of Human Resources and Social Security. CICG operates the brands "China Matters" and "Third Eye on China" on various social media platforms.

In 2015, it established a subsidiary, Xufang International Media (Chinese: 煦方国际传媒), that focuses on social media. CICG also operates a subsidiary, CICG Asia-Pacific (Chinese: 中国外文局亚太传播中心), that produces content for Asia–Pacific countries.

== Employees ==
Prominent people who have worked in the CICG include Nobel Literature Prize-winning novelist and playwright Gao Xingjian, Nobel Prize-nominated poet Bei Dao, actor and politician Ying Ruocheng (known for his role in the Oscar-winning The Last Emperor), translators Yang Xianyi and Ye Junjian, author Xiao Qian, non-fiction novel writer Xu Chi, cartoonist Ding Cong, former Chinese Foreign Minister Qiao Guanhua, and former UN Undersecretary General (1972–1979) Tang Mingzhao.

In 2009, after the Beijing Television Cultural Center fire, the vice president of the China International Publishing Group stated that quantity of media exposure would not necessarily help perceptions of China. Rather, he said, media should focus on emphasizing Chinese culture "to convey the message that China is a friend, not an enemy".

Several foreign employees have also gained notoriety, including the pseudonymous author "Alex Hill," whose account of working as a foreign editor for the organization was widely read in 2015. In his account, the author writes of feckless bureaucracy, political correctness, and a general feeling of malaise among the many foreigners working in the compound.

== See also ==
- International communication center
