= China Pictorial =

Chinese magazine

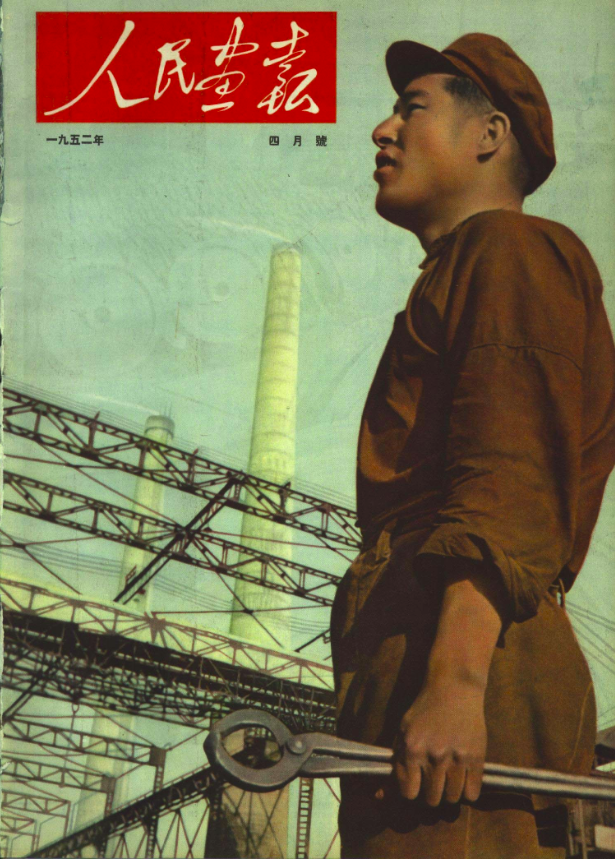
China Pictorial, April 1952

The China Pictorial, known in Chinese as Renmin Huabao (simplified Chinese: 人民画报; traditional Chinese: 人民畫報; lit. 'People's Pictorial') is a Chinese monthly magazine first published in 1950. The title of the magazine was handwritten by Mao Zedong. Published by the China International Communications Group, the magazine was one of four publications allowed during the Cultural Revolution in China. The magazine was instrumental to promote the revolution.

In addition to the Chinese edition, there are other editions in different languages, including English, Korean, Japanese, Arabic, French, German, Italian, and Russian. In 1960, seventeen editions were published after 10 years of existence.

== History ==
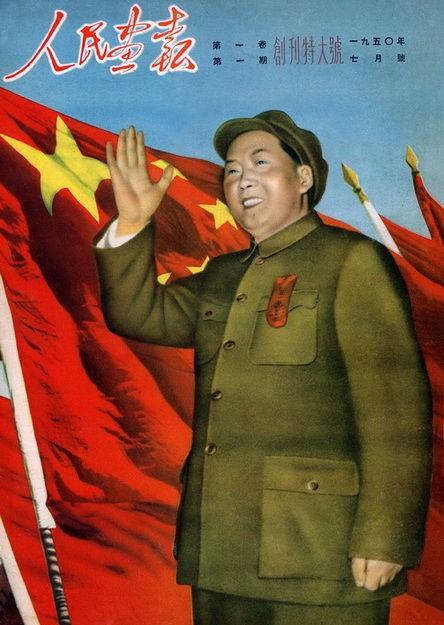
The cover of the inaugural issue in 1950, featuring a portrait of Mao Zedong

In May 1948, Jinchaji Pictorial merged with People's Pictorial and changed its name to North China Pictorial.

In June 1950, Mao Zedong changed the title of the magazine to China Pictorial. The magazine was established and first published under the name China Pictorial in July 1950. In the late 1950s a member of the Sweden China Association in Stockholm, Nils Holmberg, was hired by the Chinese authorities to translate the content of the magazine into Swedish.

Since its establishment, the magazine has never ceased publication, and was published as usual during the Cultural Revolution.

At the end of 2001, China Pictorial was selected as one of the "China Periodical Phalanx" evaluated by the National Press and Publication Administration, and was awarded the title of "Periodical with Double Effect on Social and Economic Benefits".

In October 2002, China Pictorial released its Korean language edition.

In 2003, China Pictorial was awarded the second National Periodical Award in a competition conducted by the General Administration of Press and Publication. In 2005, People's Pictorial won the third National Periodical Award.

In 2018, the magazine was named as one of the "Top 100 Newspapers" in the country by the Department of News and Press of the State Administration of Press, Publication, Radio, Film and Television.

== See also ==
- China Today
