= Foreign Languages Press =

Publishing house located in China

Coordinates: 39°55′35″N 116°19′56″E

- Parent company: China International Communications Group
- Founded: 1952; 74 years ago
- Country of origin: China
- Official website: www.flp.com.cn

Foreign Languages Press is a government publishing house located in China.

Based in Beijing, it was founded in 1952 and currently forms part of the China International Communications Group, which is owned and controlled by the Publicity Department of the Chinese Communist Party.

The press publishes books on a wide range of topics in eighteen languages spoken primarily outside China. Much of its output is aimed at the international community – its 1960s editions of works by Marx and Lenin are still widely circulated – but it also publishes some material aimed at foreign language students within China.

== History ==
At its founding, Foreign Languages Press was part of China's International News Bureau. The purpose of establishing Foreign Languages Press was to increase international distribution of material for foreign readers, particularly to the non-socialist countries. In 1952, it was re-organized under the Publicity Department.

Foreign Languages Press started publications including China Pictorial, People's China, China Reconstructs, and Peking Review. It also published the journal Chinese Literature, which focused on translations of classics by May Fourth authors, socialist realists, and Stalin Prize winners.

Beginning in the 1950s many works of classical and modern Chinese literature were translated into English by translators such as Gladys Yang, Yang Xianyi and Sidney Shapiro. Among the May Fourth authors whose works Foreign Language Press translated were: Lu Xun, Guo Moruo, Mao Dun, and Ding Ling.

In 1967, Foreign Languages Press began publishing Quotations from Chairman Mao Zedong in Albanian.

== See also ==
- Foreign Languages Publishing House (Soviet Union), Moscow – similar publisher in Soviet Union
- Foreign Languages Publishing House (North Korea), Pyongyang – similar publisher in North Korea
- Foreign Languages Publishing House (Vietnam), Hanoi – similar publisher in Vietnam which is now known as Thế Giới Publishers
