= Selected Works of Mao Tse-Tung =

Five volume collection of the written works of Mao Zedong

- Volume 1 of the English translation of the Selected Works of Mao Tse-Tung.
- Author: Mao Zedong
- Original title: 毛泽东选集
- Translator: Foreign Languages Press
- Publisher: People's Publishing House
- Published: 1960
- Published in English: 1965
- No. of books: 5

The Selected Works of Mao Tse-Tung (Note: (Notes on the romanization of Chairman Mao's name: During Mao's lifetime the English-language media universally rendered his name as Mao Tse-tung, using the Wade–Giles system of transliteration for Standard Chinese though with the circumflex accent in the syllable "Tsê" dropped. Due to its recognizability, the spelling was used widely, even by the Foreign Ministry of the PRC after pinyin (Hanyu Pinyin) became the official romanization system in 1958. The spelling "Mao Zedong" will be used in the rest of this article, except in citations and reference to the titles of books, articles, and other media.)) (simplified Chinese: 毛泽东选集; traditional Chinese: 毛澤東選集; pinyin: Máozédōng Xuǎnjí), is a five volume collection of the written works of Mao Zedong ranging from the years 1926–1957. The collection was first published by the People's Publishing House in 1951, and was later translated into English by the state-owned Foreign Languages Press. A fifth volume, which included the works of Chairman Mao from 1949 to 1957, was released during the leadership of Hua Guofeng, but subsequently withdrawn from circulation for its perceived ideological errors. There has never been an official "Complete Works of Mao Zedong" collecting all his known publications. A number of unauthorized volumes of the Selected Works of Mao Tse-Tung have been released, such as Volumes 6–9 which were published in India by the Communist Party of India (Maoist).

During the ten years of the Cultural Revolution (1966–1976), the People's Publishing House published 870 different editions of Selected Works of Mao Tse-Tung (Volumes 1–4), with a total of 325 million paperbacks and 2.55 million hardcover copies of the Chinese editions created. The Selected Works were also translated into a 14 different foreign languages.

== History ==
After the Seventh National Congress of the Chinese Communist Party, Mao Zedong became the Chairman of the Chinese Communist Party and the Mao Zedong Thought became part of the guiding ideology of the Chinese Communist Party. During the Chinese Civil War, various Communist Party-controlled areas published unofficial anthologies of Mao Zedong. It is estimated that 21 unauthorized versions of the Selected Works were published.

In 1951, when Mao Zedong visited the Soviet Union, General Secretary Joseph Stalin suggested that Mao publish his anthology. In May 1950, the Politburo of the Chinese Communist Party formally decided to establish the Mao Zedong Anthology Editorial Committee, with Liu Shaoqi as its director. The specific editing work was led by Chen Boda, assisted by Hu Qiaomu and Tian Jiaying, and all compiled manuscripts were revised and authorized for publication by Mao himself.

The five officially published volumes of the Selected Works include most of the important works by Mao Zedong between the years 1926 to 1949. The first volume covers the period of 1926 to 1936 with selections related to the revolutionary civil wars in China. The second volume begins with the philosophical work by Mao, On Contradiction and contains writings from the years 1937 to 1938 related to the war against Japan. Selections discussing military strategy against both the Japanese and the Kuomintang are the subject of the third volume of the selected works, which contains selections from writings released between the years 1939 and 1940. The fourth volume covers the writings of Mao from the years 1941 to 1945, continuing the discussion of Chinese resistance to the Japanese. The fifth and final official publication is a selection of writings from the years 1945 to 1949 related to the final years of the Chinese civil war and the founding of the People's Republic of China. Each volume of the Selected Works includes detailed notes referencing the historical context of each selection included in the volumes.

== Volume Information ==
Volume	Subject Range	Publication Date	Nº of Articles
Volume 1	1925–1937	October 12, 1951	17
Volume 2	Early Sino-Japanese War	April 10, 1952	40
Volume 3	Later Sino-Japanese War	April 10, 1953	31
Volume 4	Pre-Founding of the PRC	September 30, 1960	70
Volume 5	1949–1957	March 1977	70

=== Volume 1 ===
The first volume of the Selected Works included a total of 17 articles ranging from 1925 until the outbreak of the Second Sino-Japanese War. Published in October 1951, it was first printed by Xinhua Printing Factory, Peking First Branch Factory. It was sold at a price of 15,000 yuan and 200,000 copies printed.

=== Volume 2 ===
The second volume of the Selected Works included a total of 40 articles by Mao Zedong in the early days of the Second Sino-Japanese War. It was formally published and distributed by the People's Publishing House on April 10, 1952, with a price of 25,000 yuan.

=== Volume 3 ===
The third volume of the Selected Works included 31 articles by Mao Zedong in the late period of the Second Sino-Japanese War. It was formally published and distributed by People's Publishing House on April 10, 1953, and was priced at 15,000 yuan.`

=== Volume 4 ===
Publication of the fourth volume was especially promoted, as there were major efforts from 1959-1960 to emphasize the importance of Mao's writings.

The fourth volume of the Selected Works included a total of 70 articles by Mao Zedong after the Second Sino-Japanese War and before the founding of the People's Republic of China. It was officially published and distributed by the People's Publishing House on September 30, 1960, priced at 14,000 yuan.

After the publication, the Central Committee of the Chinese Communist Party set up a translation room for Mao Zedong's works, which translated the Selected Works four volumes into a variety of foreign languages for publication. Since then, the translation room has gradually developed into the Document Translation Department of the Central Committee of the Communist Party.

In addition to the four-volume edition, there is also a four-volume "one volume".

=== Volume 5 ===
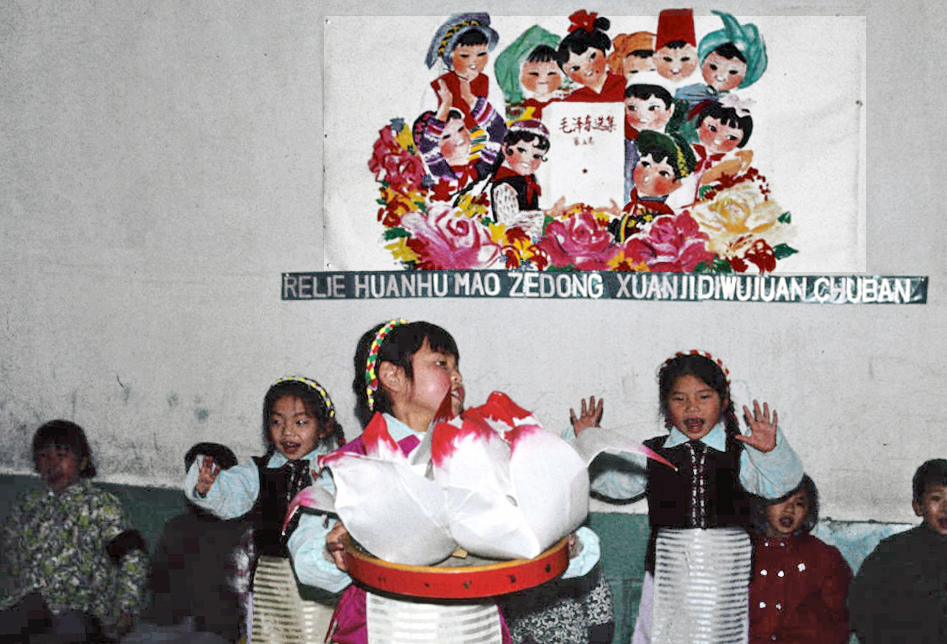
In 1978, a kindergarten in Shanghai put up propaganda on the wall that writes, in Mandarin pinyin, "Hurray for the release of the 5th volume of the Selected Works of Mao Tse-Tung"

A fifth book was planned as early as 1960, to include selected writings from the PRC period, but Mao resisted its production as he felt his essays and speeches on Socialist Construction (1949–1957) were still evolving compared to the views contained in the earlier volumes.

The fifth volume of the Selected Works included 70 articles by Mao Zedong after the founding of the People's Republic of China. It was formally published and distributed by People's Publishing House on April 15, 1977, with a price of 1.25 yuan. The compilation and editing of this volume took ten years due to the Cultural Revolution and Mao Zedong's opposition to the publication of a fifth volume of his works. Hua Guofeng insisted on the publication of the fifth volume of the Selected Works.

== Unofficial Publications ==
A number of unofficial volumes of the Selected Works of Mao Tse-Tung, specifically Volumes 6–9 were published in India by Karanti Publications, Secunderabad, and Sramikavarga Prachuranalu, Hyderabad.
