= People's Publishing House =

Chinese publishing company

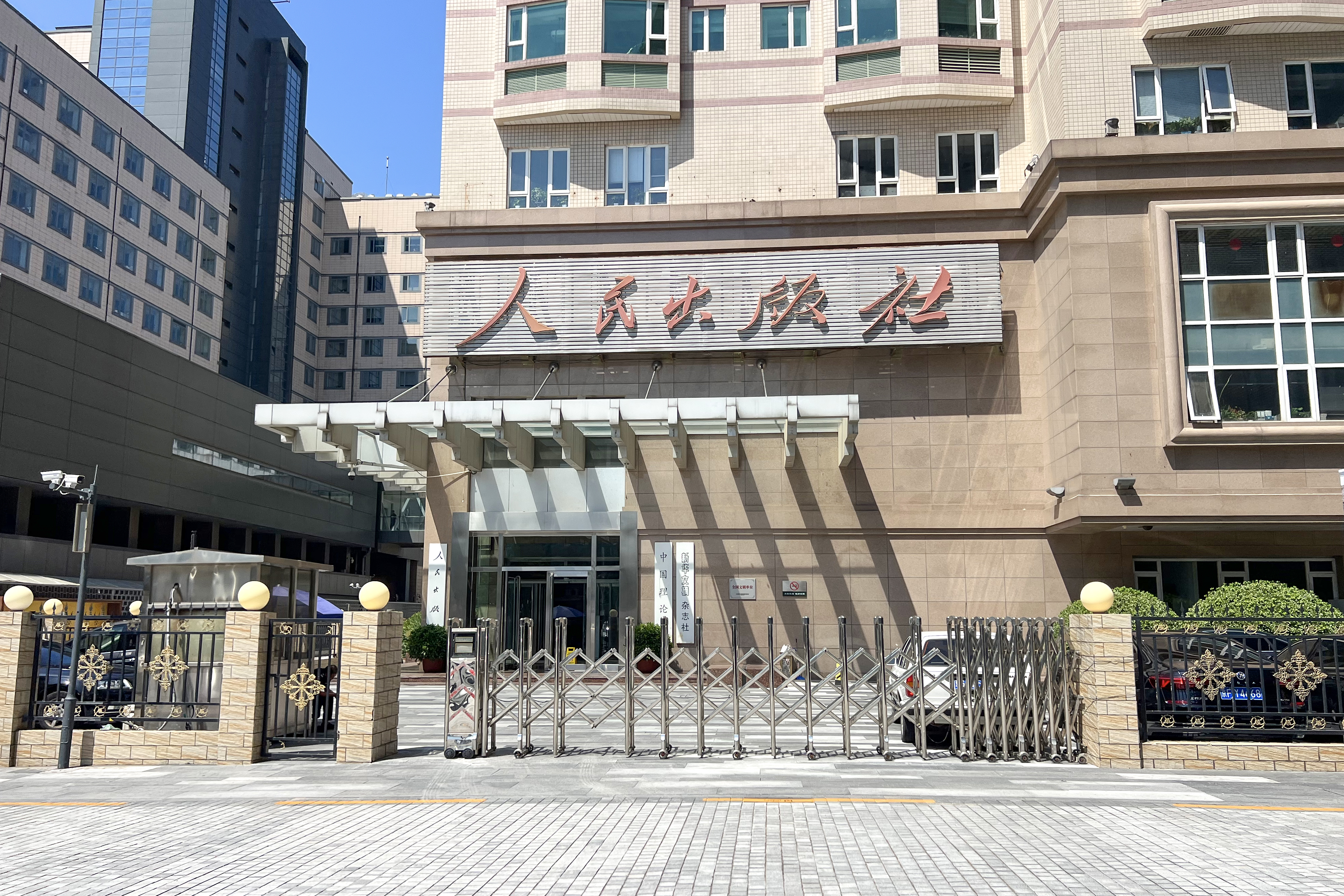
- Headquarters
- Status: Active
- Founded: 1 September 1921
- Country of origin: China
- Headquarters location: Beijing, China
- Publication types: Books, periodicals
- Owner: Central Propaganda Department of the Chinese Communist Party
- Official website: www.pph166.com

People's Publishing House (Chinese: 人民出版社; pinyin: Rénmín Chūbǎnshè), abbreviated as PPH, also known as People's Press, is China's state-run publishing house based in Beijing, which mainly publishes books on philosophy and social sciences, and is the official publisher of political and ideological books for the Chinese Communist Party and the Chinese government.

It is run by the Central Propaganda Department of the Chinese Communist Party. Its important publications include classic works of Marxism, and works by "Leaders of the Party and State" of the People's Republic of China.

== History ==
People's Publishing House was originally established 1 September 1921. It was established for the purpose of publishing communist texts. Its founder was Li Da.

In 1923, People's Publishing House merged with other Communist Party printing organizations.

People's Publishing House was re-established on 1 December 1950. It was the first official publishing house of the People's Republic of China government.

In August 1966, People's Publishing House took over the work of printing Quotations from Chairman Mao Zedong, which had originally been published by the People's Liberation Army. Quotations was made available to the public through Xinhua Bookstores.

In December 1979, People's Publishing House released a major Chinese translation of Edgar Snow's Red Star over China under the new title Mao Zedong's 1936 Conversations with Edgar Snow.

In 1986, Ge Jianxiong's dissertation, Population Geography of the Western Han Dynasty (西汉人口地理), was published as a monograph by the People's Publishing House, which was the first doctoral thesis of history published in the People's Republic of China.

== Publications ==
=== Works of Leaders of the Party and the State ===
These texts include:

- Quotations from Chairman Mao Tse-tung
- Selected Works of Mao Tse-Tung
- General Secretary Xi Jinping important speech series
