= Xue Fan =

Chinese musicologist and translator specializing in foreign songs (1934–2022)

- 薛范
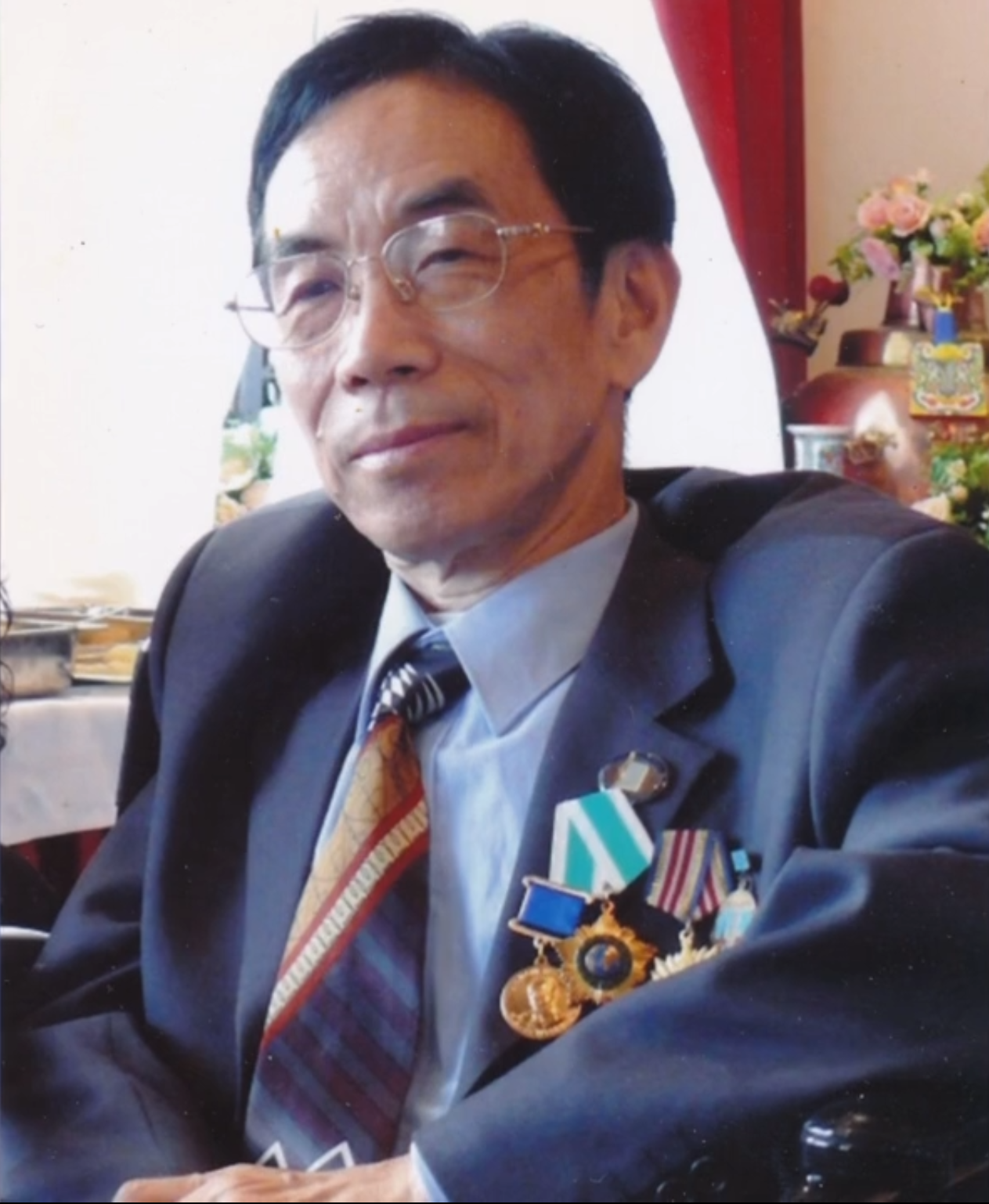
- Born: Wen Shengyuan; September 21, 1934; Shanghai, Republic of China (1912–1949)
- Died: September 2, 2022 (aged 87); Shanghai, People's Republic of China
- Education: Shanghai International Studies University (Russian advanced studies); Xiangming High School (formerly Zhendan Affiliated Middle School); Shanghai Jingye High School
- Occupation: Musicologist • Translator
- Known for: Translation and promotion of foreign songs in China
- Political party: Independent
- Awards: Senior translator, Translators Association of China; Lifetime Achievement Award in Chinese Translation Culture (among others)
- Website: xuefan.net

Xue Fan (Chinese: 薛范; pinyin: Xuē Fàn; 21 September 1934 – 2 September 2022) was a Chinese musicologist, translator, and leading figure in the adaptation of foreign songs into Chinese. His birth name was Wen Shengyuan (闻声远), and he also used the pen name Ji Zhimo (嵇志默).Over a career spanning more than seven decades, he translated and adapted more than 2,000 songs from outside mainland China, including over 1,000 from the Soviet Union and Russia, and compiled and published more than thirty collections of foreign songs. He was a member of the China Writers Association, Chinese Musicians' Association, and Translators Association of China, a national council member of the China-Russia Friendship Association, a guest professor at Shanghai Normal University, and an honorary committee member of the eighth session of the Shanghai Federation of Literary and Art Circles.

At the age of two, Xue Fan contracted poliomyelitis, resulting in permanent paralysis of his lower limbs. During his student years, he developed a love for literature and music and began creating and submitting works. After graduating from high school in 1952, he was admitted to the Shanghai Russian Language Vocational School but was denied enrollment due to his disability. He subsequently learned Russian, English, Japanese, French, and other languages through radio broadcasts and self-studied university-level Chinese literature courses. In his youth, Xue Fan actively engaged in the translation and adaptation of foreign songs, while also translating poetry, writing plays, and engaging in literary criticism. He gained fame in 1957 with his translation of the lyrics for "Moscow Nights". Following the Sino-Soviet split, his creative output gradually declined. After the thaw in Sino-Soviet relations, he abandoned literary writing to focus again on the translation and study of foreign songs. Xue Fan never held a formal job and had no children; prior to receiving the Order of Friendship, he long relied on manuscript fees and his parents' income for support.

As one of the few specialists in mainland China dedicated to the translation and study of foreign songs, Xue Fan comprehensively developed song translation theory and detailed methods and requirements for lyric adaptation. He also contributed to promoting people-to-people exchanges between China and Russia and disseminating foreign songs—primarily Soviet and Russian ones—in mainland China. In his later years, he organized more than five hundred concerts of foreign songs in mainland China, earning the title of "preacher" of Soviet and Russian songs. Xue Fan received honors from the Government of Russia six times. In 1997, for his "outstanding contributions to Russian-Chinese friendship and cultural exchanges," he was awarded the Order of Friendship by then-President of Russia Boris Yeltsin.

== Biography ==
=== Early life ===
Xue Fan was born on September 21, 1934, in Shanghai, with the birth name Wen Shengyuan. "Xue Fan" became his most commonly used pen name starting in the 1950s. Xue Fan was the eldest son in his family, born to parents who were senior factory employees. He had seven siblings.^{:132} At age two he contracted poliomyelitis; despite two months of treatment by famous doctors sought by his grandmother, it left him permanently reliant on crutches and a wheelchair.^{:132} He entered primary school at nominal age eight, with family escorting him through high school graduation.^{:132} In primary school, he read Ye Shengtao's fairy tales and Heart, sparking his love for literature. In junior high, he read various Chinese and foreign novels and poetry, including General Yue Fei, the Family–Spring–Autumn trilogy, and Ge Baoquan's translation of Alexander Pushkin's collected works, and began writing and submitting pieces. At his parents' request, he studied piano in primary and junior high but stopped due to inability to use pedals from his leg disability and only being able to play simple pieces "with difficulty".^{:313} After victory in the Second Sino-Japanese War, he encountered his first Soviet song, "Wide is My Motherland", and the Soviet song that left the deepest impression in his youth was the Chinese lyrics "Guangming zan" (Hymn to Light, 光明赞) written by Xie Wenjin and Xiao San for "Brothers, to the Sun, to Freedom". Xue Fan also loved radio and semiconductors in his youth and could assemble a five-tube crystal radio independently.^{:133}

In 1949, Xue Fan graduated from the junior high division of Jingye High School. That October, classmates carried him to the Shanghai Cultural Square to attend the "Xian Xinghai Night" concert, where the live performance of Yellow River Cantata rekindled his interest in music; he subsequently self-studied music theory and composition. In his second year of high school, he became editor of the class wall newspaper. In 1951, his radio drama Zuguo, wo weile ni (Motherland, for You, 祖国，我为了你) was broadcast on the "Youth Program" of East China·Shanghai People's Radio Station. During high school, he further explored Soviet, European and American, Arab, Indian, and other literary styles. In 1952, he graduated from Zhendan University Affiliated High School; English was the foreign language he had studied since primary school.^{:133} He planned to apply for radio engineering but, due to his disability and the high point of Sino-Soviet relations at the time, his homeroom teacher Zhang Qikun persuaded him to switch to liberal arts and study Russian instead, "like Pavel Korchagin using the pen as a weapon in the battle of life." His first choice was Chinese department, second Russian.^{:258}^{:314} That autumn, he was admitted to the Shanghai Russian Language Vocational School but was rejected on registration day by the school due to his severe lower limb paralysis not being noted by the medical examiner.

=== Self-study, translation, and literary creation ===
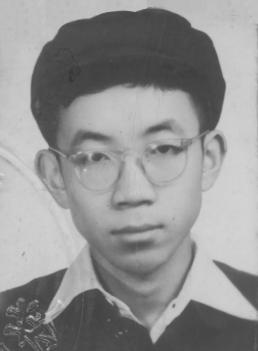
Xue Fan in 1953

After rejection by the Shanghai Russian School, Xue Fan focused on literary study, self-teaching literature and drama based on Fudan University Chinese department materials, and enrolled in Shanghai Russian Language Radio School to learn Russian via broadcasts. During this period, he read extensively in Russian translations and used two versions of Cao Ying's translation of Pyotr Pavlenko's novel Schastye (Russian: Счастье) as self-study textbooks for translation. Due to frequent letters to the radio's "Friends of Listeners" column, he was invited multiple times to visit East China·Shanghai People's Radio Station. In 1953, encouraged by Zhu Chongmao, conductor of the station's orchestra, he published his first translated foreign song, "Peace Fighters' Song" (Russian: Песня борцов за мир), under his birth name Wen Shengyuan in Shanghai Broadcast (上海广播, later renamed Broadcast Song Selection, 广播歌选), using the fee to buy foreign language dictionaries. In 1955, he underwent spinal surgery. That year, his translations Selected Soviet Songs (苏联歌曲选), Collection of Western Classical Songs (苏联歌曲选), Anthology of Western Classical Songs (西方古典歌曲集), and three volumes of Soviet Song Compilation (苏联歌曲汇编) were successively published. In 1958, he graduated from the Russian advanced class at Shanghai International Studies University. Besides songs, he translated poetry from Soviet, Yugoslav, and other writers, with some published in Yiwen (译文), People's Daily, Wenhui Bao, etc., and accepted invitations from Shanghai Literature and Art Publishing House to co-publish six volumes of foreign poetry selections. During the Great Leap Forward, inspired by Shanghai Conservatory students Xiao Bai and others winning first prize for large-scale works at the 7th World Festival of Youth and Students with the cantata-style Happiness River Chorus (幸福河大合唱), he wrote the music story film script The Unfinished Song (没有唱完的歌), adopted by Shanghai Film Studio but shelved due to the Three Years of Difficulty.

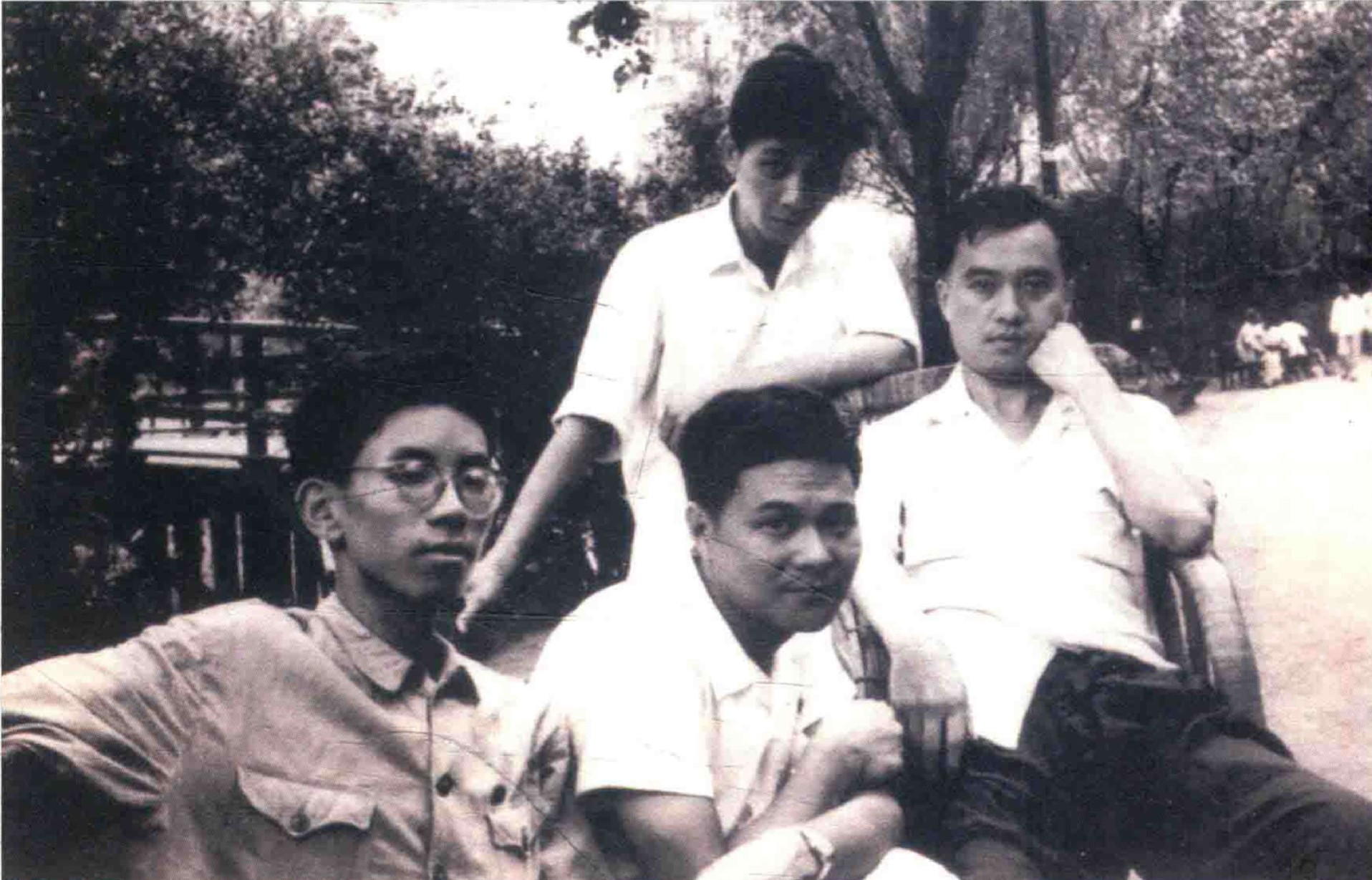
Xue Fan in the 1950s (first from left)

In July 1957, from Sovetskaya Kultura he saw the gold medal-winning songs from the 6th World Festival of Youth and Students, and happened to have sheet music for three including "Moscow Nights"; he decided to translate, but initial versions were unsatisfactory. In September, on the way home from a performance, hearing Frédéric Chopin's Nocturne in E-flat major on Huaihai West Road inspired him; he rewrote the lyrics in an hour at home. Soon published in Shanghai's Broadcast Song Selection (广播歌选) and Beijing's Songs (歌曲) magazines, the Chinese singing version aired on Shanghai People's Radio's "Song of the Week" (每周一歌). Provincial music publications reprinted it, causing a nationwide sensation. During translation, he wrote to composer Vasily Solovyov-Sedoi and the Red Banner Song and Dance Ensemble, receiving replies, scores, and manuscripts. In 1960, he revised the lyrics again; the revised version appeared in the third volume of Soviet Song Compilation (苏联歌曲汇编) published that year by Shanghai Literature and Art Publishing House but was less widely circulated than the earlier one.

=== Sino-Soviet split and Cultural Revolution ===
After the Sino-Soviet split, Xue Fan shifted to translating foreign songs outside the Soviet Union via Russian or English versions, mainly from Asia, Africa, and Latin America. He self-studied full university Chinese courses, History of the Communist Party of the Soviet Union (Bolsheviks): Short Course, and political economy, hand-copied 16 volumes of Chinese and foreign poetry, studied Stanislavski and other dramatists' theories, and wrote plays based on the Cuban Revolution, Yue Fei, and Patrice Lumumba's assassination: Red Carnation (红石竹花), Man Jiang Hong (满江红), Roar! Congo (怒吼吧，刚果). The film script Man Jiang Hong was adopted by Film Literature (电影文学) but not published due to the Cultural Revolution halting the magazine; parts of the play Roar! Congo were used by the Navy Political Department Drama Troupe in the same-themed play Fury of Coconut Grove (椰林怒火). He wrote arts and literary criticism like "Comedy Scenery · Scenery Comedy" (喜剧的布景·布景的喜剧) published in Xinmin Evening News and others, hoping to focus on literary and dramatic research while translating. Due to meager song translation fees, he could not afford recorders or foreign scores; for hard-to-find Third World songs, he translated by ear in cinemas. In 1965, People's Daily cultural supplement editors required political background and attitude toward China for a submitted poem's author; lacking information, he did not provide it and stopped translating foreign poetry.

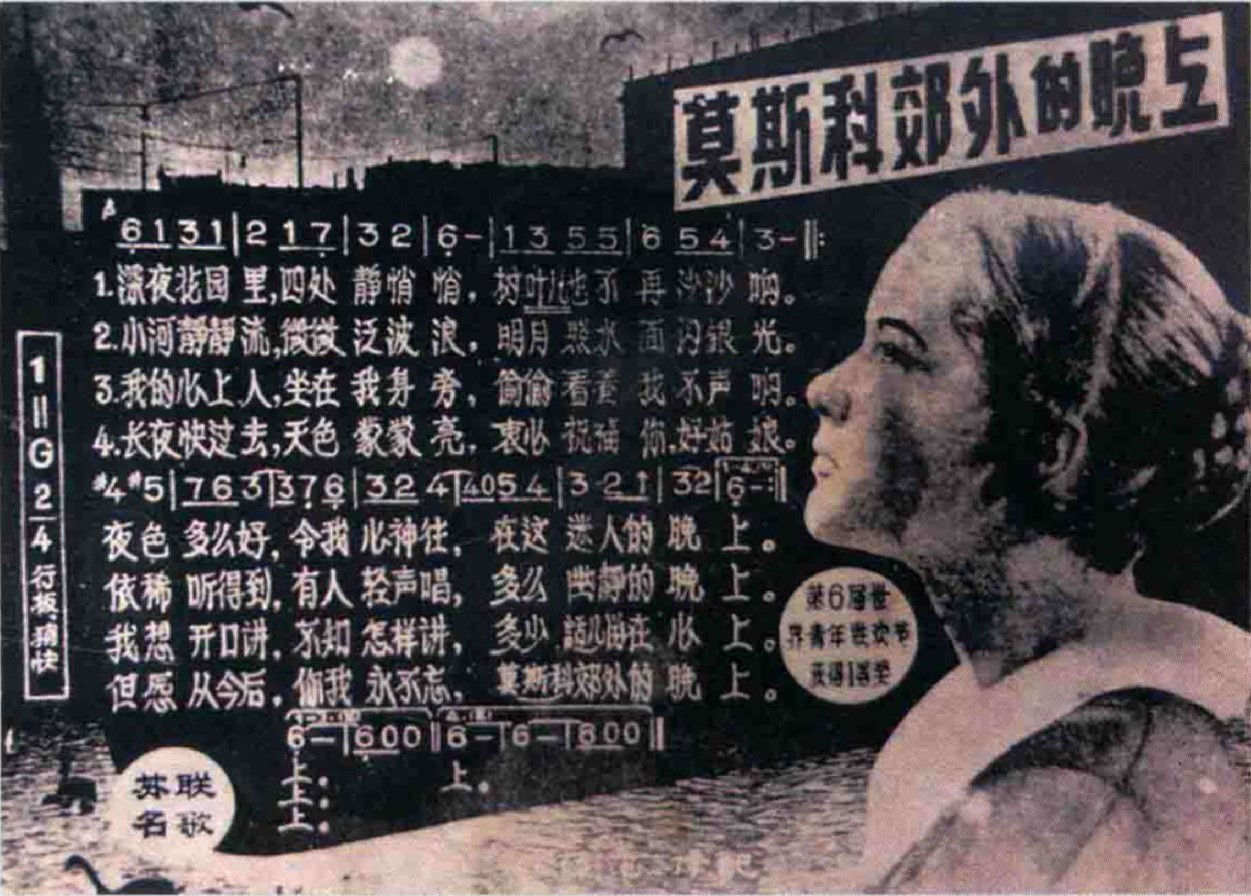
1950s Shanghai publication of Chinese lyrics for "Moscow Nights", with "Xue Fan translated and adapted" faintly visible below.

During the Cultural Revolution, his parents' salaries were halved, worsening his difficulties; he was forced to swear not to translate Soviet songs. During Destroy the Four Olds, Red Guards confiscated and destroyed his accumulated Chinese and foreign books, periodicals, scores, music materials, note cards, unfinished book History of "The Internationale", and other manuscripts, leaving only the four-volume Selected Works of Mao Zedong; he maintained translation thinking by reading foreign-language Selected Works and adapting Korean film The Flower Girl interludes, and learned English, Japanese, and French via radio after 1972. Besides criticism for listening to "enemy station" Radio Moscow, he avoided large-scale struggle unlike many artists. After the Cultural Revolution, rebels returned manuscripts gifted by Vasily Solovyov-Sedoi. After the Third Plenum of the 11th Central Committee of the Chinese Communist Party, sensing relaxation in ideological control, he self-funded visits to Shanghai Library to review Soviet periodicals from the Cultural Revolution for Soviet music developments but still could not publish Soviet songs publicly. He completed the play Xin Qiji (辛弃疾) but abandoned drama after rejection by Shanghai Film for "outdated style"; inspired by rejection, he took pen name "Ji Zhimo" (嵇志默, homophonic with "die with unfulfilled ambition" from Jiang Yan's Fu on Regret), completing historical novels Lang pai Caishi ji (浪拍采石矶) and Ping shei wen (凭谁问), published in Da Jiang (大江) and Xiaoshuo tiandi (小说天地). In song adaptation, China Film Publishing House published his Selected Foreign Film Songs (外国电影歌曲选集) in 1981, including Cultural Revolution-era adaptations like The Flower Girl interludes. He also translated some Western popular music, notably "We Are the World".

=== Thaw in Sino-Soviet Relations and Revival of Song Translation and Adaptation ===
External image
- Yeltsin (left) and Xue Fan (center), November 10, 1997

After 1985, as Sino-Soviet relations thawed, Xue Fan resumed foreign song adaptation and research, abandoning literature, and published compilations like Selected Best Soviet Songs 1917–1987 (1917－1987苏联歌曲佳作选, abbreviated Best Selection, 佳作选) for the 70th anniversary of the October Revolution. On January 28, 1986, introduced by then-executive director Su Yang of the Chinese Musicians' Association, he was approved as a member; in 1988 he joined the Chinese Writers Association, later the Translators Association of China.^{:320} In 1987, he spent two weeks at National Library of China organizing and copying 1960s Soviet periodicals.^{:319–320} On March 27, 1988, he organized a release event and Soviet song concert for Best Selection in Shanghai; the Soviet Consulate-General in Shanghai staff and families bought tickets spontaneously to attend and meet him.

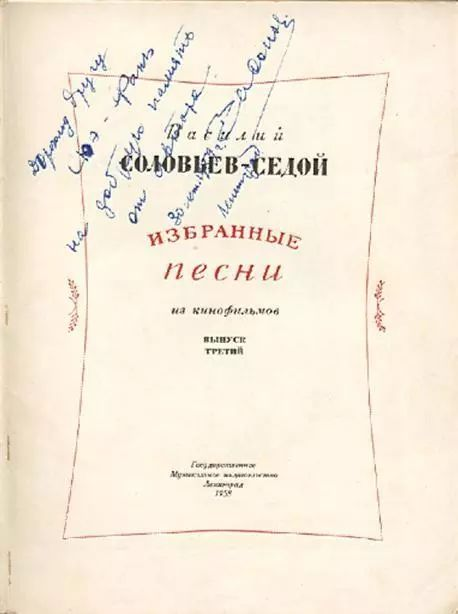
Book cover and inscription gifted to Xue Fan by Vasily Solovyov-Sedoi in 1957, returned by rebels after Cultural Revolution.

In August 1994, Xue Fan planned the "Moscow Night" concert with Shanghai Philharmonic Orchestra and Shanghai Philharmonic Chorus; performances in Shanghai and Beijing were well-received, the first Soviet-Russian song concert in mainland China after the dissolution of the Soviet Union, with then-Vice Premier of the State Council Li Lanqing and Ministry of Foreign Trade and Economic Cooperation Wu Yi attending the latter. In November, with the Central Orchestra Chorus he planned the touring "Volga Night" concert, performing over a hundred times. In November 1995, he received an honorary certificate from the Government of Russia for "great contributions to promoting and disseminating Soviet-Russian songs in China". On November 10, 1997, for "outstanding merits in Russian-Chinese friendship and cultural exchanges," he received the Order of Friendship from visiting President of Russia Boris Yeltsin at the Russian Embassy in China, followed on October 5, 1999, by the "China-Russia Friendship Medal" and "Russia-China Friendship Medal" jointly awarded by Chinese and Russian governments, presented by then-Vice Chairman of the Standing Committee of the National People's Congress Buhe.

In 2002, Hubei Education Press published his monograph Exploration and Practice of Song Translation (歌曲翻译探索与实践), the first theoretical work on song translation in mainland China. In June 2007, invited by the Moscow China-Russia Cultural Exchange Center and China-Russia Friendship Association, he visited Russia, met composers like Alexandra Pakhmutova, and received the Russian Federation "N. Ostrovsky" Medal. That November, he sent his Classics of Russian-Soviet Famous Songs (俄苏名歌经典) and three other works to then-Premier of the State Council Wen Jiabao, receiving a reply. In 2009 he received the Russian Federation "Merit Medal for Developing Russian-Chinese Relations". In 2015, he registered "Xue Fan Music Studio", (薛范音乐工作室) responsible for translating and producing Soviet-Russian films and song videos, giving regular community lectures; besides netizens, he was the sole staff member. That year, he held "Appreciation of Pre-Soviet 'World War II' Story Films" themed lectures at eight Shanghai community cultural centers, screening studio-dubbed films, followed by World War II song appreciation lectures at 20 Shanghai communities and units, receiving Russian Consul-General in Shanghai Andrei Smorodin. This earned him a special contribution award from the Shanghai Municipal Party Committee Publicity Department for "70th Anniversary of Victory in Chinese People's War of Resistance Against Japanese Aggression and World Anti-Fascist War" themed lectures in March 2016. In 2017, Shanghai Music Publishing House published his adapted Selected Belarusian Songs, earning a commendation from the Ministry of Culture of Belarus for "outstanding contributions to Sino-Belarusian cultural cooperation". That year he was diagnosed with prostate cancer and underwent surgery, with declining health thereafter. In January 2019, he was appointed honorary committee member of the eighth session by the Shanghai Municipal Federation of Literary and Art Circles. On March 3, 2019, netizens questioned singer Hua Zhou's 2012 online song "Mom Wants Me to Get Married" (妈妈要我出嫁) crediting herself as lyricist matching Xue Fan's adaptation of the Belarusian folk song of the same name (Russian: Как хотела меня мать). On March 5, Hua Zhou admitted "oversight" on Weibo, accepting full legal responsibility; her agency apologized, contacted Xue Fan for apology, received his statement of understanding, and obtained authorization for the translated lyrics' copyright.

On August 16, 2020, Xue Fan attended the Shanghai Book Fair and held a sharing session for Selected 60 Years of Xue Fan's Music Essays (薛范60年音乐文论选) at Shanghai Library lecture hall. On October 15 he attended a symposium celebrating the 70th anniversary of the Shanghai Municipal Federation of Literary and Art Circles. On April 1, 2022, at the Eighth National Congress of the Translators Association of China, he received the "Lifetime Achievement Award in Translation", accepted at home on August 2. On August 11 he received "Shanghai Music Publishing House Lifetime Achievement Translator" title; hours later he was hospitalized critically. At 21:31 (UTC+8) on September 2, 2022, Xue Fan died of illness at Shanghai Ninth People's Hospital, Shanghai Jiao Tong University School of Medicine, aged 88.

== Influence ==
=== Works and collections ===
Xue Fan adapted over two thousand songs from outside mainland China, including over a thousand Soviet-Russian songs such as "Moscow Nights", "Song of Restless Youth", "Polyushko-pole", "Warsaw Song", "Red Berries in Blossoms", "Suliko", "The Beautiful Afar", "Victory Day", "Dark Is the Night", "Zemlyanka", "What Does Motherland Begin With?", "The Wide Dniepr Roars and Moans", etc. Songs from other countries include "Proof of the Man", "We Are the World", "La Vie en rose", "Lili Marleen", "La Paloma", "Nobody's Child", "Edelweiss", "Red River Valley", "The Flower Girl", etc. Before the 1980s, his adaptations focused mainly on Russian lyrical songs. From the 1980s, he adapted large numbers of English and other non-Russian songs, plus contemporary Russian popular music. Since publishing "Memory" in 1991, he adapted and published over 150 English songs in The World of English. Besides popular songs, he adapted theme songs for animated series like Transformers, Hana no Ko Lunlun, Doraemon, etc. In musical theatre, he introduced and adapted parts of The Phantom of the Opera; in 2012 he served as "senior lyric translation consultant" for the Chinese adaptation of Cats and adapted the Chinese libretto. Before his death, he created an unproduced musical Toward the Future in Song (在歌声中走向未来), tracing different periods of Russian music and classic songs—the only musical he wrote. In the 1950s, he translated poetry manuscripts for Shanghai Literature and Art Publishing House, co-publishing six poetry collections.

Xue Fan compiled over thirty foreign song collections in his lifetime. Monographs include History of Soviet Songs, History of Rock Music, Overview of Anti-Fascist Songs in Europe and America During World War II, Exploration and Practice of Song Translation, etc. Compiled collections include Soviet Song Collection, Soviet Song Compilation, Selected Songs of Isaak Dunayevsky, Classics of Russian-Soviet Famous Songs 1917–1991, etc. His first compilation was the co-translated Selected Soviet Songs volumes 1 and 3 published by People's Music Press in 1955; his first independent compilation was Soviet Song Compilation published by Shanghai Music Publishing House in 1957, followed by volumes 2 and 3. Thereafter, he published nearly yearly foreign song collections with Shanghai Music Publishing House, such as Latin American Song Collection, World Songs (three volumes), etc. In the mid-1980s, he compiled Selected Best Soviet Songs 1917–1987; to accompany it, he published "History of Soviet Songs" in six installments in Shanghai Music Publishing House's Music Lover (音乐爱好者) in 1987, and in 1989 a seven-installment "History of Rock Music" (摇滚乐史话) plus articles on Soviet rock. In 2002, his sole-authored Exploration and Practice of Song Translation was published by Hubei Education Press, the first theoretical work on song translation in mainland China. In 2007, Shanghai Music Publishing House published his collected Classics of Russian-Soviet Famous Songs (俄苏名歌经典) and Selected Treasures of Russian-Soviet Songs (俄苏歌曲珍品选集) with original scores. In 2010, he edited Selected Ukrainian Songs (乌克兰歌曲选集) published by China International Radio Press, the first Ukrainian song collection in mainland China. In 2017, Shanghai Music Publishing House published his adapted Selected Belarusian Songs (白俄罗斯歌曲选集), the first Belarusian song collection published in mainland China, earning a commendation from the Belarus Ministry of Culture.

In 2013 and 2020, Shanghai Music Publishing House published Xue Fan's selected works Selected 60 Years of Xue Fan's Translated Songs and Selected 60 Years of Xue Fan's Music Essays, collecting representative songs from his translation career and some published theoretical articles. The National Museum of Modern Chinese Literature holds some of Xue Fan's translation manuscripts and published song collections.

=== Critics ===
As a long-standing advocate for promoting people-to-people exchanges between China and Russia and cultural interactions between China and other nations, Xue Fan's creative achievements have garnered positive recognition from official, academic, and grassroots circles in both China and Russia. Former Premier Wen Jiabao said Xue Fan "made contributions to China's music and arts cause and Sino-foreign cultural exchanges under extremely difficult circumstances," praising his "strong will despite disability, unremitting struggle," and "selfless dedication." Shanghai Conservatory of Music professor Qian Renkang said Xue Fan "pursued both theory and practice of song translation throughout life, inclusive, with rich achievements on both sides." Shen Wenzhong, full-time vice-chairman and Secretary-General of the Shanghai Federation of Literary and Art Circles, praised Xue Fan for his lofty ideals, noting that "despite limited mobility, his footprints are everywhere in the community" and that he "truly embodies wholehearted dedication to the people." Former chairman of the musicology and criticism committee of the Union of Russian Composers Vladimir Zak said Xue Fan had "excellent aesthetic sense for lyrics, grasping singability, turning your translations into music," and "it was you who gave these songs life on Chinese soil." Former head of the Red Army Choir Colonel Dmitri Vasilyevich Somov said Xue Fan "gave Russian-Soviet songs a second life in China." Vice chairman of the Russian-Chinese Friendship Association and Friendship Medal recipient Galina Kulikova called Xue Fan "a hero of China, China's Nikolai Ostrovsky." Chinese premiere director of the musical Cats Jo-Ann Robinson said translators including Xue Fan "did everything possible to restore the essence of Cats authentically."

==== Honors and commemoration ====
China News Service report "Moscow holds concert to revisit veteran translator Xue Fan's works"

In November 1995, he received an honorary certificate from the Russian government for "great contributions to promoting and disseminating Soviet-Russian songs in China". On November 3, 1997, President Boris Yeltsin signed Decree No. 1147 awarding the Order of Friendship to Gao Mang, Li Delun, Xue Fan, and Wu Zuqiang for "outstanding merits in Russian-Chinese friendship and cultural exchanges"; Xue Fan received it personally from Yeltsin at the Russian Embassy on November 10, becoming one of the first mainland Chinese cultural figures so honored. In 2007 he received the Russian Federation "N. Ostrovsky" Gold Medal, in 2009 the "Merit Medal for Developing Russian-Chinese Relations", in 2017 a commendation from the Belarus Ministry of Culture, and in 2019 was selected by the Russian side as one of the top ten outstanding Chinese figures in Sino-Russian people-to-people exchanges in the "Top Ten Outstanding Figures in Sino-Russian Cultural Exchange" co-hosted by Guangming Daily and TASS, receiving a congratulatory letter from Russian Ambassador to China Andrey Denisov. On April 11, 2022, Russian-Chinese composer Zuo Zhenguan and the Russian-Chinese Friendship Association held a "Xue Fan Works Concert" in Moscow, with the Russian Philharmonic Orchestra and Chinese vocal students in Russia performing his adaptations.

On October 5, 1999, he received the "China-Russia Friendship Medal" and "Russia-China Friendship Medal" jointly awarded by both governments from then-Vice Chairman of the NPC Standing Committee Buhe. In 2005 he received "Senior Translator of China" from the Translators Association of China, and in 2003, 2004, and 2013 Beijing, Tianjin, and Shanghai held concerts marking 50 and 60 years of his translation career. In March 2016 he received a special contribution award from the Shanghai Municipal Party Committee Publicity Department for themed lectures on the 70th anniversary of victory in the Anti-Japanese and World Anti-Fascist Wars. In 2017 he received a "Special Contribution Award" from the Shanghai Translators Association, in January 2019 honorary committee membership from the Shanghai Municipal Federation of Literary and Art Circles, in April 2022 the "Lifetime Achievement Award in Translation" from the Translators Association of China, and on August 11, 2022 "Shanghai Music Publishing House Lifetime Achievement Translator".

After his death, the Translators Association of China issued a statement on September 3, 2022, sending condolences to the Shanghai Translators Association and family. TASS and Rossiyskaya Gazeta reported his passing; TASS quoted views that "his translations have played and continue to play an important role in people-to-people exchanges between the two countries". On September 29–30, Beijing Kalinka Chorus and Soviet-Russian song enthusiasts held a voluntary memorial concert for Xue Fan in Beijing. His posthumous manuscripts are being organized by family.

== Translation theory and practice ==
=== Functional translation ===
In foreign song translation and adaptation research, Xue Fan endorsed and applied functional translation theory, advocating that the overall principle of translated lyrics is fidelity to music, with "musicality" as the translation object. He said: "It's not how 'faithful' the lyrics are, but whether target-language listeners can understand the original meaning through the translated song and appreciate and feel the beauty of the original." He believed song lyrics must capture the original's rhythm and intonation, avoiding "inverted tones" (Chinese tones clashing with melody contour) and "broken sentences" (incorrect Chinese breaks) as key points, achieving both literary and musical qualities—"recitable, singable, listenable"—while "lyric translation" only requires rough understanding of original intent, imagery, language, and structure.^{:56-57;73-76} He opposed claims that "foreign songs are untranslatable," seeing it as denying musicality. Though non-related languages involve emotional and linguistic deviations, vocal music differs from instrumental music by needing social and literary imagery alongside musical; adaptation enables dramatic emotional resonance, creating complementary "dual aesthetic value" of poetry and musicality for Chinese audiences.

For cultural differences in lyrics, Xue Fan advocated starting from original symbolic meaning, using analogy compensation, replacing slang and idioms appropriately, generalizing unfamiliar flora, and adapting phrases conflicting with Chinese traditional ethics. For example, in adapting a The Sound of Music interlude, he used "活宝" for "clown"; in "Snowball Flower", he unified Russian paired snowball flower and "Malinka" (马林花, Russian: Малинка) for Chinese coherence. He advocated making Chinese lyrics colloquial with originals and replacing non-final repeats in multi-stanza songs; for "Jambalaya" (什锦菜) he transliterated "Jambalaya" as "真不赖呀", and varied phrasing for mid-song "... и не ..." repeats in "Moscow Nights". He advocated replacing "same-word repetition" in stanzas except refrains, using fusion compensation, reorganizing by sense groups, adjusting word order, stress, adding fillers for maximized expression.^{:169–186} For English "hypotactic long sentences," he used decomposition compensation, focusing on linear flow, incorporating main emotions into short Chinese sentences. Some translators like Wu Juntao saw such cultural handling as "rather arbitrary" with heavy creation; Xue explained it as "for singing."

=== Phonestheme ===
Translating a song often takes me over ten hours because most of my effort goes into ensuring the rising and falling tones of the translated lyrics blend seamlessly with the song's melodic contours. Some say my song translations have "considerable freedom," and this 'considerable' freedom stems precisely from my relentless effort to avoid "inverted words" and uphold "standard words." —Xue Fan^{:146}

For rhyming in song lyrics, Xue Fan believed that due to short phrases in mass-disseminated songs, frequent rhyme changes harming auditory beauty, and influence from classical Chinese poetry's consistent rhyme throughout, one should follow common foreign song translation practice of "consistent throughout" instead of the "foot-equivalent substitution" common in foreign poetry translation to Chinese, emphasizing sound-meaning synesthesia to compensate for the expressive loss caused by the frequent rhyme shifts in the original text. He selected rhyme feet from original or literal line ends, choosing "broad-grand" or "delicate-soft" rhymes by song emotion, rhyming entire song for repeated lines; typically even lines rhyme, odd free, opening line rhymes ("起韵"), but adjustable by phrasing; for long lyrics, change rhyme per stanza with dense rhyming, clear change cues, enhanced narrative or lyric effect. To harmonize lyrics with rhythm and achieve synesthetic resonance, he advocated matching syllable count, sentence structure, and rhythmic cadences. For foreign long lines, he used incomplete sentences for logical Chinese understanding.^{:111–123} To avoid inverted tones, he aligned Chinese four tones sequence with rising melody, logical stress with musical beat, replacing inverted words accordingly, but tolerant for repeats, tight or relaxed rhythms.^{:137–146} Some view Xue Fan's rhyme substitutions as a form of creative rebellion against the original lyrics and target language, reflecting the translator's subjective agency.

=== Mass dissemination ===
Xue Fan saw foreign song adaptation as interdisciplinary for mass dissemination, requiring combined language conversion and literary foundation, with translators as "active, dynamic co-creators" of artworks,^{:4} needing keen insight into original song's musical soul. Foreign works' influence comes not directly but through translators' "creative embodiment of artistic traits," extending influence across languages and cultures. Song adaptation's specialty is reaching closer to people's lives than other large art forms.^{:259} Due to limited media and small audiences, non-Western/non-East Asian songs like Soviet-Russian face single repertoire and difficult dissemination in mainland China; he called for treating song adaptation as cultural project between China and Russia. He disliked confining Soviet-Russian song dissemination to nostalgia, seeing nostalgic songs as having only "recognition value" while Soviet-Russian songs "sing of the future"; youth should have "broader minds, more diversity" and contact "excellent things from all countries." After Sino-Soviet thaw, through publishing collections, founding studio, lectures, reports, concerts, film and song video translation/production, he promoted foreign songs—especially Soviet-Russian—in mainland China.

Since his first concert in Shanghai in 1988, Xue Fan has organized and hosted over 500 concerts featuring Soviet/Russian or foreign songs as their theme. Among these, the 1994 "Voices of Moscow" concert was attended by Chinese Communist Party and state leaders including Li Lanqing, Wu Yi. The "Volga Voice" (伏尔加之声) concert series, co-organized with the China National Symphony Orchestra, expanded from its original two performances to over a hundred shows, achieving greater dissemination impact than anticipated. Xue Fan also frequently collaborated with overseas institutions or foreign-related entities to promote foreign songs. For instance, during Russia's "China Year" in 2007, he co-organized the "Russian-Soviet Classic Songs Cultural Week" with Beijing's Kiev Restaurant. In 2010, with his support, the "Anthology of Ukrainian Songs" (乌克兰歌曲选集) was published. In 2017, marking the 25th anniversary of China-Belarus diplomatic relations, Xue Fan published the "Belarusian Song Anthology" (白俄罗斯歌曲选集) with support from the Ministry of Culture of the Republic of Belarus and the Belarusian Consulate General in Shanghai, funded by Amkodor Holding Group. Xue Fan established the Xue Fan Music Studio, which was registered in 2015. Through the studio, Xue Fan has repeatedly collaborated with Russian and Soviet culture enthusiasts from other regions to produce film subtitles and song videos, and has organized lectures to promote foreign songs and culture. For example, in 2015, he held commemorative anti-fascist themed film screenings and song lectures in multiple communities in Shanghai. In a 2020 interview with Xinmin Evening News, Xue Fan expressed plans to establish a "choir dedicated to performing world-renowned songs in Chinese," aiming to promote foreign songs and cultures among youth.

== Personal life ==
Xue Fan long resided in a low-rise building on Zhongshan South First Road, Bansongyuan Subdistrict, Huangpu District, Shanghai, about 50 square meters. Due to disability, he never held formal employment. After his parents passed away, he lived alone, occasionally receiving assistance from relatives, friends, and part-time caregivers. Reports indicate he remained unmarried until his death. However, one memoir states that Xue Fan married Shanghai translator He Qing (born Zhang Pinqin) in his fifties. With meager royalties from song translations, Xue Fan long relied on his parents' retirement pension to sustain himself. Translator Cao Ying also assisted him with some financial hardships.

Xue Fan maintained an inverted sleep schedule, resting during the day and typically commencing work around 3 pm. Both of Xue Fan's parents had high school educations and valued reading, which led the young Xue Fan to consume vast quantities of books and develop a deep love for literature. In her later years, Xue Fan's mother, Huang Hao, suffered from Alzheimer's disease. Before her death, fearing her son would resort to begging after her passing, she specifically purchased a plastic bowl for him because it was "hard to break." Xue Fan's financial struggles persisted until Yeltsin awarded him a state medal, after which the government began providing him with a monthly subsidy of 1,000 yuan and reimbursing 70% of his medical expenses. Huang Hao ultimately passed away in 1999.

== See also ==
- Major Russian-to-Chinese translators in mainland China: Gao Mang, Cao Jinghua, Ge Baoquan, Cao Ying, Ru Long, Sun Shengwu, etc.
- Early song adapters in mainland China: Qian Renkang, Deng Yingyi, Zhao Feng, Shang Jiaxiang, etc.
