= Lifetime Achievement Award in Translation =

Chinese award

- Native name: 中国翻译文化终身成就奖
- Description: One of the most prestigious translation prizes in China, recognizing lifetime contributions to translation culture.
- Country: China
- Presented by: Translators Association of China (TAC)

The Lifetime Achievement Award in Translation (simplified Chinese: 中国翻译文化终身成就奖; traditional Chinese: 中國翻譯文化終身成就獎; pinyin: Zhōngguó Fānyì Wénhuà Zhōngshēn Chéngjiù Jiǎng), awarded by the Translators Association of China (TAC) since 2006, is one of the most prestigious translation prizes in China.

== List of recipients ==
#	Name	Language(s)	Ref
1st 2006	Ji Xianlin	English, German, Sanskrit	
2nd 2009	Yang Xianyi	English	
3rd 2010	Sidney Shapiro	English	
3rd 2010	Cao Ying	Russian	
3rd 2010	Xu Yuanchong	English, French	
3rd 2010	Tu An	English	
3rd 2010	Li Shijun	Esperanto	
4th 2011	Gao Mang	Russian	
4th 2011	Lin Wusong	English	
4th 2011	Jiang Feng	English	
4th 2011	Li Wenjun	English	
5th 2012	Tang Sheng	English	
5th 2012	Pan Handian	English, Japanese, French, German, Russian, Italian	
5th 2012	Wen Jieruo	Japanese	
5th 2012	Ren Rongrong	English, Russian, Italian, Japanese	
6th 2015	He Zhaowu	English, French, German	
6th 2015	Liang Liangxing	English	
6th 2015	Hao Yun	French	
7th 2018	Zhong Jikun	Arabic	
7th 2018	Liu Deyou	Japanese	
7th 2018	Tang Baisheng	Spanish	
7th 2018	Yang Wuneng	German	
7th 2018	Song Shusheng	German	
7th 2018	Yi Lijun	Polish	
7th 2018	Liu Mingjiu	French	
8th 2019	Cao Du	Mongolian	
8th 2019	Gu Jinping	German, Russian	
8th 2019	Lin Hongliang	Polish	
8th 2019	Wang Nongsheng	English	
8th 2019	Wang Zhiliang	Russian	
9th 2022	Wang Jinsheng	French	
9th 2022	Ehmet Pasar	Uyghur	
9th 2022	An Yiyun	Korean	
9th 2022	Zhao Zhenjiang	Spanish	
9th 2022	Shi Yanhua	English	
9th 2022	Tang Jialong	French	
9th 2022	Pan Yaohua	English	
9th 2022	Xue Fan	Russian, English	
