= Yi (surname 易) =

Chinese surname 易

- Yi surname in regular script
- Pronunciation: Yì (Pinyin); E̍k, Ī (Pe̍h-ōe-jī)
- Language: Chinese

Origin
- Language: Old Chinese

Other names
- Variant forms: Yi, Yih (Mandarin); Yick or Yik (Cantonese); Ek, Yee (Hokkien)

Yi (易), also romanized as Yee, Yick, Yik, Jek is a Chinese surname. A 2013 study found that it was the 114th most-common name in mainland China, shared by 1.75 million people, or 0.130% of the population, with the largest province being Hunan.

== Place of origin ==
According to the book Hundred Family Surnames, the Yi family originated from Jiang (姜) family who moved to Yi county (present day Chang county in Hebei province). The other place of origin is Yi county (present day Yi county in Hebei province). During the period of Qin dynasty, the Yi family were mainly situated at Shandong and Henan. At the end of Eastern Han dynasty until the beginning of Southern and Northern Dynasties period, they started to scatter across the central plains, and moving toward present day Hunan province.

== Notable people (易) ==
=== Yi ===
- Yi Baidi (易白荻; born 1993), Chinese footballer
- Yi Chu-huan (易楚寰; born 1987), Taiwanese professional tennis player
- Yi Fuxian (易富贤), Chinese demographer and obstetrics & gynecology researcher
- Yi Gang (易纲; born 1958), Chinese economist
- Yi Huiman (易会满; born 1964), Chinese banker and politician
- Ian Yi (易柏辰; born 1996), Taiwanese actor, singer, rapper, dancer
- Yi Jet Qi (易桀齊; born 1974), Malaysian Chinese singer-songwriter
- Yi Jianlian (易建联; born 1987), Chinese professional basketball player
- Kevin Yi (易家揚), Taiwanese lyricist, music industry professional, marketing executive
- Yi Kuo-juei (易國瑞; 1906–1990), Chinese Air Force pilot
- Yi Li (易立; born 1987), Chinese professional basketball coach and former player
- Yi Lianhong (易炼红; born 1959), Chinese politician
- Yi Lijun (易麗君; 1934–2022), Chinese translator, one of the foremost translators of Polish fiction
- Lucy Yi Zhenmei (易貞美; 1815–1862), Chinese Catholic saint
- Yi Peiji (易培基; 1880–1937), Chinese politician, scholar, educator
- Yi Pengfei (易鹏飞; born 1962), Chinese former politician
- Yi Siling (易思玲; born 1989), Chinese sport shooter, Olympic gold medalist
- Yi Wei-chen (易緯鎮; born 1988), Taiwanese sprinter
- Yi Xianlong (易县龙; born 2001), Chinese footballer
- Yi Yuanji (易元吉; c. 1000–1064), Northern Song dynasty painter, famous for his realistic paintings of animals
- Jiaoshou Yi Xiaoxing (born Yi Zhenxing; 易振兴; 1984), Chinese Internet celebrity, screenwriter, director
- Yi Zhongtian (易中天; born 1947), Chinese historian, author, scholar, TV personality
- Yi Zuolin (易作霖; 1897–1945), Chinese linguist, educator, philanthropist

=== Others ===
- Chia-Shun Yih (易家训; 1918–1997), Chinese American engineer and physicists
- Yee Chih-yen (易智言; born 1959), Taiwanese film director and screenwriter
- Frankie Yick (易志明; born 1953), member of the Legislative Council of Hong Kong
- Jackson Yee (易烊千璽; born 2000), Chinese actor, singer, dancer
- Jek Yeun Thong (易润堂; 1930–2018), Singaporean politician

== Fictional people ==
- Master Yi, the Wuji Bladesman (易 - 无极剑圣), a playable champion character in the multiplayer online battle arena video game League of Legends
- Yi, a Chinese Wild Kratts Girl, from the TV show Wild Kratts
