= Cao Ying =

Cao Ying may refer to:

- Cao Ying (translator) (草婴, 1923–2015), translator
- Cao Ying (sport shooter) (曹英, born 1974), sport shooter
- Cao Ying (actress) (曹颖, born 1974), actress
