= Han Yi =

Han Yi may refer to:

- Yi Lijun, Chinese translator who uses the pen name Han Yi
- Han Yi (footballer), Chinese footballer
