= Hao Yun (translator) =

Chinese translator (1925–2019)

- Born: Hao Liandong (郝连栋); 1925; Nanchang, Jiangxi, China
- Died: 2019 (aged 93–94); Shanghai, China
- Education: Sino-French University
- Occupation: Translator
- Writing career
- Language: Chinese, French
- Notable works: The Red and the Black; The Charterhouse of Parma; The Black Tulip; Letters from My Windmill

Chinese name
- Traditional Chinese: 郝運
- Simplified Chinese: 郝运
Transcriptions
Standard Mandarin
- Hanyu Pinyin: Hǎo Yùn

Hao Yun (Chinese: 郝运; 1925 – 10 June 2019) was a Chinese translator. Over a career spanning seven decades, he translated more than 60 works from French to Chinese. He was conferred the Lifetime Achievement Award in Translation by the Translators Association of China.

== Biography ==
Hao was born as Hao Liandong (郝连栋) in 1925 in Nanchang, Jiangxi, Republic of China. He graduated from Department of French Literature of the Sino-French University, which was exiled in Kunming during the Second Sino-Japanese War, in 1946.

From 1947 to 1953 Hao worked for the Red Cross Society of China in Nanjing, Shanghai, and Beijing. After 1953, he worked as an editor at Pingming Publishing House (平明出版社) and Shanghai Xinwenyi Publishing House (上海新文艺出版社). He resigned from his job in 1958 because of lung disease.

After his disease was cured, he dedicated himself to translating French literature into Chinese and joined the Shanghai Translation Institute in 1961. From 1979 he worked at Shanghai Translation Publishing House. Over a career that lasted 70 years, he translated more than 60 French works, including The Red and the Black, The Charterhouse of Parma, The Black Tulip, Letters from My Windmill, and Selected Novels of Daudet. He was also an editor for French-Chinese Dictionary.

Hao was a member of the China Writers Association. In 2015, he was conferred the Lifetime Achievement Award in Translation by the Translators Association of China.

Hao died on 10 June 2019 at Renji Hospital in Shanghai, at the age of 94.
