= Zuolin (name) =

Zuolin (Chinese: 作霖) is a masculine given name. Notable people with the name include:

- Huang Zuolin (Chinese: 黄作霖), Chinese film director
- Yi Zuolin (Chinese: 易作霖), Chinese linguist and educator
- Zhang Zuolin (Chinese: 張作霖; 1875–1928), Chinese warlord
