= Ge Baoquan =

Chinese literary translator and cultural diplomat (1913–2000)

- 戈宝权
- Born: February 15, 1913; Dongtai, Jiangsu, Republic of China
- Died: May 15, 2000 (aged 87); Nanjing, Jiangsu, People's Republic of China
- Education: Da Xia University
- Occupations: Writer, literary translator
- Relatives: Ge Gongzhen (uncle)
- Writing career
- Pen name: Baoquan, Beiquan, Beichen, Sumu
- Language: Chinese
- Years active: 1935–2000
- Notable awards: Order of Friendship of Peoples

Ge Baoquan (Chinese: 戈宝权; pinyin: Gē Bǎoquán. February 15, 1913—May 15, 2000), born in Dongtai, Jiangsu, was a Chinese international cultural activist and literary translator. He began engaging in translation and foreign literature research in the early 1930s, and served as deputy secretary-general of the China-Russia Friendship Association, research fellow at the Institute of Literature of the Chinese Academy of Social Sciences, council member of the China Writers Association, and council member of the Translators Association of China, among other positions.

== Biography ==
=== Early life and education ===
Ge Baoquan was born on February 15, 1913, in Dongtai, Jiangsu. He began school at age five, completing four years of primary school and three years of upper primary school before entering the Dongtai Muli Normal School founded by Zhang Jian in 1925. In 1928, he enrolled in the Faculty of Law and Economics at The Great China University in Shanghai. There he studied English, French, and Japanese, taught himself Esperanto, and later learned Russian, reading extensively in Chinese and foreign literature—particularly the works of famous Russian authors such as Pushkin, Tolstoy, and Turgenev. During this period, he also translated lyric poems by Byron, Shelley, and Rossetti, short stories by Tolstoy, and—from Japanese—an interview with the Irish poet Yeats. He graduated with a bachelor's degree in law after three and a half years. In 1932, on the recommendation of university president Ou Yuanhuai, he became an editor at the publishing department of The China Times, where he contributed a regular column titled "Summaries of World Celebrities and Their Works" to the weekly New Life, thus embarking on a career as editor, translator, and journalist.

=== Wartime years ===
From 1935, Ge served as the Tianjin-based Ta Kung Pao correspondent stationed in Moscow, Soviet Union, for three years. After the Marco Polo Bridge incident of 1937, he decided to return to China and join the resistance. He traveled from Moscow through Poland, Germany, and France, then sailed for 22 days across the Atlantic and Pacific, arriving in Saigon. He continued via Nanning and Guilin, and reached Wuhan in early 1938. Introduced by Ai Hansong, he became an editor and editorial board member of the Xinhua Daily and the journal Masses. On the recommendation of Ai Hansong and editor-in-chief Wu Kejian, Ge passed organizational scrutiny and officially joined the Chinese Communist Party in May, becoming active in the same party branch as Zhou Enlai. At Zhou's suggestion, he took on underground activities as a secret party member.

He participated in editorial work successively in Wuhan and Chongqing, and during this period also became acquainted with prominent cultural figures such as Zou Taofen and Guo Moruo. After the New Fourth Army Incident, at Zhou Enlai's instruction, Ge disguised himself and left, traveling via Guiyang and Guilin to Hong Kong. There he contributed translations to publications such as the Hua Shang Daily and Mass Life (大众生活), served on the editorial board of Youth Knowledge (青年知识), and co-founded the "Literary and Art News Agency" (文艺通讯社) with Ye Yiqun, supplying material to progressive newspapers in Hong Kong, Macau, and Nanyang.

In late 1941, the outbreak of the Pacific War led to Hong Kong's occupation by Japanese forces. On January 9, 1942, Ge, together with Mao Dun, Ye Yiqun, and a group of cultural figures, changed into civilian clothes on Lockhart Road in Hong Kong, disguised as "refugees," and were guided by East River Column couriers past Japanese checkpoints and inspection stations. By dusk they reached Causeway Bay Typhoon Shelter and boarded a large barge that had been prepared in advance. The following day they arrived safely at a secret reception point in Kowloon. On January 11, they departed Kowloon, proceeding along the western route via Castle Peak Road, through secret routes, and past Japanese blockades. They then crossed mountains and valleys, forded the Sham Chun River, and on January 13 safely reached the anti-Japanese base area at Yangtai Mountain in Bao'an.

In May 1942, following Zhou Enlai's instructions, he returned to the Chongqing Xinhua Daily, where he translated several reportage collections about the Spanish Civil War and the Soviet–German War. After Japan's surrender in 1945, Ge was tasked with founding a Xinhua Daily in Shanghai, but Kuomintang obstruction prevented publication. During this period he served in editorial roles at Life Bookstore and Times Publishing House, and published several translated works and research writings. On March 16, 1946, Ge Baoquan and Xia Yan were injured in a collision with a U.S. Army jeep.

=== Cultural envoy ===
In the spring of 1949, Ge participated as a member of the delegation led by Guo Moruo at the First World Peace Congress held in Prague, Czechoslovakia. Before departure, Zhou Enlai publicly revealed Ge's secret party membership. In June of the same year, Ge joined the CPC Central Committee delegation led by Liu Shaoqi on a secret visit to the Soviet Union. After the talks concluded successfully, he was temporarily retained in Moscow as a Xinhua News Agency correspondent in the Soviet Union, effectively serving as a liaison between the two parties.

On July 16, 1949, he was one of the founders of the China-Russia Friendship Association and one of 81 members of its preparatory committee. After the Association's national headquarters was established on October 5, he was one of its 197 council members. On July 23, when the All-China Federation of Literary Workers (renamed the China Writers Association in October 1953) was established in Beiping, Ge was one of 69 inaugural committee members elected. In early October 1949, following the establishment of Sino-Soviet diplomatic relations, the Ministry of Foreign Affairs appointed Ge as counselor and chargé d'affaires ad interim of the People's Republic of China Embassy in the Soviet Union. In November, after the arrival of Wang Jiaxiang as the first PRC ambassador to the Soviet Union, Ge was appointed counselor. In 1954, he became deputy secretary-general of the China-Russia Friendship Association.

During the Cultural Revolution, he was sent down with the entire staff of the Institute of Foreign Literature to a May Seventh Cadre School in Xi County, Henan, for labor re-education. Foreign literature was branded a product of "feudalism, capitalism, and revisionism" and placed in a reading "forbidden zone." Ge turned to a careful study of literary allusions cited in the works of Marx and Engels, and later published Greek and Roman Mythological Allusions in Selected Works of Marx and Engels.

In 1980 he became a founding member of Chinese PEN Center.

=== Later years and legacy ===
In September 1983, he returned to his hometown of Dongtai—which he had left more than fifty years earlier—and donated a collection of books. In 1985, the Jiangsu provincial government arranged a private courtyard residence for him near the Banshuiyuan city wall in Nanjing. On July 5, 1986, he donated approximately 20,000 volumes from his personal collection to the Nanjing Library. The library established a special "Ge Baoquan Reading Room" in his honor. He received a government prize, which he returned to society by establishing the "Ge Baoquan Translation Prize."

From 1995 onward, he was bedridden due to Parkinson's disease. He died in Nanjing on May 15, 2000, at the age of 88. His will requested that there be no memorial service and no farewell ceremony. His wife Liang Peilan honored this wish, setting up only a simple mourning hall at home to receive condolences from friends.

== Works and research ==
=== Literary research ===
- Pushkin
- Lu Xun

=== Language and translation ===
Esperanto

Ge Baoquan was not only a highly accomplished translator but also a noted veteran Esperanto speaker. He taught himself Esperanto while studying at Da Xia University, and later, while working at the Xinhua Daily and Life Bookstore (生活书店工作), maintained close ties with Esperantists such as Teru Hasegawa.

On January 25, 1981, a founding congress of the Beijing Esperanto Association was held at the Xinqiao Hotel in Beijing, at which Ge was elected its first chairman. During his ten years in office, the Beijing Esperanto Association he led held 113 Esperanto training classes with a total of 4,400 students. A Beijing Esperanto Choir and Drama Troupe were also established. Large exhibitions and cultural performances were held on multiple occasions at the Beijing Working People's Cultural Palace, Zhongshan Park, and other venues. In 1985, he led a 40-person Beijing Esperanto delegation to the first National Esperanto Congress held in Kunming. In 1986, as head of the Beijing Esperanto delegation, he delivered a report at the 71st World Esperanto Congress held in Beijing.

== Honors and awards ==
- Honorary Fellow of the Hong Kong Translation Society (1989)
- Ivan Franko Literary Prize (Union of Writers of Ukraine, 1988)
- Order of Friendship of Peoples (Soviet Union, March 1, 1988): awarded in recognition of his contributions to strengthening Soviet–Chinese cultural cooperation and introducing Russian and Soviet literature, and in celebration of his 75th birthday.
- Pushkin Literary Prize (Soviet Union, 1988): awarded in recognition of his contributions to translating, studying, and introducing Russian culture. (Presented by Soviet Ambassador to China Troyanovsky at the Soviet Embassy on behalf of the Soviet Literary Fund and the Board of the Union of Soviet Writers.)
- Honorary doctorate from Moscow State University (1987)
- Honorary doctorate from University of Paris VIII (February 24, 1987)

== Family ==
- Grandfather: Ge Minglie (also known as Ge Junshu, a late-Qing gongsheng)
- Father: Ge Shudong (also known as Ge Shaojia, a well-known educator in Dongtai County)
- Uncle: Ge Gongzhen
- First wife: Zheng Xingli (singer)
- Second wife: Shalina
- Third wife: Liang Peilan
- Daughter: Ge Xiaoli (with Zheng Xingli)
- Nephew: Sun Ge

== Selected works ==
- Ge Baoquan (May 1990). 《谢甫琴科诗集》 [Selected Poems of Shevchenko] (1st ed.). Yilin Press. ISBN 9787805670645.
- Ge Baoquan (July 1987). 《戈宝权译文集：普希金诗集》 [Ge Baoquan's Translations: Poems of Pushkin] (1st ed.). Beijing Publishing House. ISBN 7200002216.
- Ge Baoquan (September 1983). 《纳斯列丁的笑话：土耳其的阿凡提的故事》 [The Jokes of Nasreddin: Stories of the Turkish Afanti]. World Folk Literature Series (1st ed.). Beijing: China Folk Literature and Art Publishing House.
- Ge Baoquan (1978). 《马克思恩格斯选集》中的希腊罗马神话典故 [Greek and Roman Mythological Allusions in Selected Works of Marx and Engels]. Beijing: Sanlian Bookstore.
- 《高尔基早期作品选》 [Selected Early Works of Gorky]. Translated by Ba, Jin; Yi, Xin; Ge, Baoquan (1st ed.). Beijing: People's Literature Publishing House. November 1978.
- 《恰佑比诗选》 [Selected Poems of Qayumiy]. Translated by Ge, Baoquan; Sun, Wei; Lu, Yong (1st ed.). Beijing: People's Literature Publishing House. November 1964.
- 《拉扎尔·西理奇诗集》 [Poems of Lazar Siric]. Translated by Ge Baoquan (1st ed.). Beijing: Writers Publishing House. November 1964.
- 《德拉戈·西理奇诗集》 [Poems of Drago Siric]. Translated by Ge Baoquan (1st ed.). Beijing: Writers Publishing House. April 1964.
- 《穆索尔斯基歌曲选》 [Selected Songs of Mussorgsky]. Translated by Ge Baoquan (1st ed.). Beijing: Music Publishing House. December 1963.
- 《阿雷·托康巴耶夫诗集》 [Poems of Aaly Tokombaev]. Translated by Qiu Qin, Ge Baoquan (1st ed.). Beijing: Writers Publishing House. May 1963.
- 《安哥拉诗集》 [Angola Poetry Collection]. Translated by Ge Baoquan (1st ed.). Beijing: Writers Publishing House. May 1963.
- 《米凯亚诗选》 [Selected Poems of Mikaia]. Translated by Ge Baoquan (1st ed.). Beijing: Writers Publishing House. May 1962.
- 《吉亚泰诗选》 [Selected Poems of Jiatai]. Translated by Ge Baoquan (1st ed.). Beijing: People's Literature Publishing House. November 1959.
- Gorky (February 1950). 《我怎样学习写作》 [How I Learned to Write]. Translated by Ge Baoquan. Sanlian Bookstore.
- Gurshtan (June 1949). 《论文学中的人民性》 [On the National Character in Literature]. Translated by Ge Baoquan (1st ed.). Tianxia Publishing House.
- Ge Baoquan (April 1949). 《苏联文学讲话》 [Talks on Soviet Literature] (1st ed.). New China Bookstore.
- Marshak (March 1949). 《十二个月》 [The Twelve Months]. Translated by Ge Baoquan (1st ed.). Shanghai: Times Press.
- Rogov; Ge Baoquan (December 1948). 《高尔基研究年刊 1948》 [Gorky Studies Yearbook 1948]. Shanghai: Times Press.
- Blok (May 1948). 《十二个》 [The Twelve]. Translated by Ge Baoquan. Shanghai: Times Press.
- Bazhov (1948). 《宝石花》 [The Stone Flower]. Ural Folk Legends. Translated by Ge Baoquan. Shanghai: Times Press.
- Ge Baoquan, Lin Ling (October 1948). 《（俄罗斯大戏剧家）奥斯特洛夫斯基研究》 [Studies on (the Great Russian Playwright) Ostrovsky]. Shanghai: Times Press.
- Rogov; Ge Baoquan (December 1947). 《普希金诗集》 [Poems of Pushkin] (1st ed.). Times Publishing House.
- Ehrenburg (May 1945). 《英雄的斯大林城》 [Heroic Stalingrad]. Translated by Ge Baoquan.
- Ehrenburg (November 1942). 《六月在顿河》 [June on the Don]. Reports on the Soviet–German War. Translated by Ge Baoquan. Chongqing: Xinhua Daily Book Division.

Journal and newspaper articles (early period)

- "普希金诗抄(二十首)" [Poems of Pushkin (Twenty Poems)]. Soviet Literature (1). Translated by Ge Baoquan: 21–38. 1980.
- (Ghana) Michael Dei-Anang (June 26, 1965). "《我站立在这儿》" [I Stand Here]. People's Daily. Translated by Ge Baoquan: 6.
- (Angola) Agostinho Neto (June 13, 1963). "《火焰和节奏》" [Flame and Rhythm]. People's Daily. Translated by Ge Baoquan: 5.
- (Angola) Mário Pinto de Andrade (August 27, 1962). "《萨巴鲁之歌》" [Song of Sabalu]. People's Daily. Translated by Ge Baoquan: 4.
- (Georgian) Vazha-Pshavela (July 26, 1961). "《瓦查·普沙韦拉诗选》" [Selected Poems of Vazha-Pshavela]. People's Daily. Translated by Ge Baoquan: 8.
- Ge Baoquan (March 10, 1961). "《谢甫琴柯诗三首》" [Three Poems by Shevchenko]. People's Daily: 8.
- Ge Baoquan (June 6, 1959). "《普希金和中国》" [Pushkin and China]. People's Daily: 8.
- Ge Baoquan (1957). "《从伟大的十月到我们的今天——十位苏联诗人的作品选辑》" [From the Great October to Our Day—Selected Works of Ten Soviet Poets]. Shikan (10).
- (Ukrainian) Ivan Franko (August 28, 1956). "《颂歌》" [Hymn]. People's Daily. Translated by Ge Baoquan: 8.
- (Albanian) Aleks Çaçi (August 23, 1955). "克里姆林宫的红星把我们团结在一起（外一首） 我的阿尔巴尼亚是个美丽的国家" [The Red Star of the Kremlin Unites Us (with one additional poem): My Albania Is a Beautiful Country]. People's Daily. Translated by Ge Baoquan: 6.
- (Bulgarian) Lyudmil Stoyanov (July 23, 1952). "《桂冠——纪念尼·瓦普查罗夫》" [The Laurel—In Memory of Nikola Vaptsarov]. People's Daily. Translated by Ge Baoquan: 3.
- (Bulgarian) Orlin Orlinov (1950). "《中国——这就是你们》" [China—This Is You]. People's Literature (9). Translated by Ge Baoquan.
