= Liu Mingjiu =

Chinese translator (1934–2022)

- 柳鸣九
- Born: April 1934; Changsha, Hunan, China
- Died: 15 December 2022 (aged 88)
- Education: Peking University
- Occupation: Translator
- Spouse: Zhu Hong
- Children: 1
- Writing career
- Language: Chinese, French
- Notable work: History of French Literature

Chinese name
- Traditional Chinese: 柳鳴九
- Simplified Chinese: 柳鸣九
Transcriptions
Standard Mandarin
- Hanyu Pinyin: Liu Mingjiu

Liu Mingjiu (Chinese: 柳鸣九; April 1934 – 15 December 2022) was a Chinese translator. He was the first Chinese to translate Jean-Paul Sartre's works into Chinese, and was also known as the first person in Jean-Paul Sartre's research in China. He was among the first few in China who translated the works of Albert Camus's into Chinese language. His translations are well respected by domestic and international scholars.

In his later career, he was a researcher of the Institute of Foreign Literature of the Chinese Academy of Social Sciences, director of its Southern Europe and Latin American Literature Research Department and professor of its Foreign Languages Department of the Graduate School. He was the president of the French Literature Research Association of China, director of the Chinese Foreign Literature Research Association, a member of the China Writers Association and a member of the International Pen Center.

== Biography ==
Liu was born in Changsha, Hunan, in April 1934. His father was a cook. He has two brothers. He secondary studied at Hunan Provincial First High School. In 1953 he was accepted to Peking University, where he majored in French language and literature. After university, he was assigned to the Institute of Literature, Ministry of Social Sciences of China. In 1964 he was transferred to the Institute of Foreign Literature, Chinese Academy of Social Sciences, becoming a member of Honorary Department of Chinese Academy of Social Sciences in 2006. After 1981, he went to the United States and France for many academic visits. In 2000, he was officially selected as the subject of doctoral dissertation at the University of Paris, France.

== Personal life and death ==
Liu married Zhu Hong (朱虹), who is an expert in British and American culture. Their son, Liu Difei (柳涤非), died at the age of 37. The couple had a granddaughter named Liu Yicun (柳一村) who lives in the United States.

Liu died on 15 December 2022, at the age of 88.

== Works ==
- 柳鸣九文集 [Liu Mingjiu's Collections] (in Chinese). Beijing: Haitian Press. 2015. ISBN 9787550713635.
- 一本书搞懂法国文学 [Understanding French Literature in a Book] (in Chinese). Beijing: Beijing University of Technology Press. 2012. ISBN 9787564057282.
- 文学史：法兰西之韵 [Literary History: The Rhyme of France] (in Chinese). Beijing: China Social Science Press. 2014. ISBN 9787516142349.
- 友人对话录 [Record of Friends' Dialogue] (in Chinese). Beijing: Central Compilation Publishing House. 2018. ISBN 9787511735010.
- 名士风流：二十世纪中国两代西学名家群像 [Famous Scholars: Two Generations of Western Scholars in China in the 20th Century] (in Chinese). Beijing: Central Compilation Publishing House. 2017. ISBN 9787511732026.

== Translations ==
- Boule de Suif (羊脂球)
- Selected Short Stories by Maupassant (莫泊桑短篇小说精选)
- The Stranger (局外人)
- Last Lesson: A Selection of Dude's Short Stories (最后一课：都德短篇小说精选)
- Carmen (卡门)
- The Essence of Merrill's Novel (梅里美小说精华)
- The Little Prince (小王子)

== Awards ==
On 19 November 2018, he was awarded the Lifetime Achievement Award in Translation, one of the most prestigious translation prizes in China.
