= Song Shusheng =

Chinese politician

- 宋书声

Director of the Compilation and Translation Bureau
- In office August 1980 – July 1996
- Preceded by: Wang Huide
- Succeeded by: Wei Jianhua

Personal details
- Born: 1928 (age 97–98) Xinhe County, Hebei, China
- Party: Chinese Communist Party
- Education: Beijing Foreign Studies University

Chinese name
- Simplified Chinese: 宋书声
- Traditional Chinese: 宋書聲
Transcriptions
Standard Mandarin
- Hanyu Pinyin: Sòng Shūshēng

Song Shusheng (Chinese: 宋书声; born 1928) is a Chinese translator and politician who served as director of the Compilation and Translation Bureau between 1980 and 1996. He was one of the founders of the Translators Association of China and also president of the association from 1998 to 2004. He was a representative of the 12th, 13th, and 14th National Congress of the Chinese Communist Party. He was a member of the 8th and 9th National Committee of the Chinese People's Political Consultative Conference.

== Biography ==
Song was born in Xinhe County, Hebei, in 1928. He joined the Chinese Communist Party (CCP) in 1949. In 1949, he graduated from the Russian language class of the Foreign Language Department of the Second Department of North China University (now Beijing Foreign Studies University). In 1951, he became a translator in the Translation Office of Stalin's Complete Works by the Publicity Department of the Chinese Communist Party. In 1953, he joined the newly founded Compilation and Translation Bureau, where he eventually became director in June 1980. He retired in 2005.

== Awards ==
- 2018 Lifetime Achievement Award in Translation

Party political offices
Preceded by Wang Huide	Director of the Compilation and Translation Bureau; 1980–1996	Succeeded by Wei Jianhua
Non-profit organization positions
Preceded by Ye Shuifu	President of the Translators Association of China; 1998–2004	Succeeded by Liu Xiliang
