= Liu Deyou =

Chinese politician and translator

- 刘德有
- Born: January 1937 (age 89); Dalian, Liaoning, China
- Occupations: Politician, translator
- Writing career
- Language: Chinese, Japanese

Chinese name
- Traditional Chinese: 劉德有
- Simplified Chinese: 刘德有
Transcriptions
Standard Mandarin
- Hanyu Pinyin: Liǘ Déyǒu

Liu Deyou (Chinese: 刘德有; born January 1937) is a Chinese politician and translator.

== Biography ==
Liu was born in Dalian, Liaoning under Japanese rule, in January 1937. In the winter of 1952, Liu was transferred to Beijing from Dalian and worked in People's China magazine. He began his translation career during that time.

From the mid-1950s to the mid-1960s, he often served as an interpreter when Mao Zedong, Zhou Enlai, Chen Yi, Wang Zhen and Guo Moruo met with foreign guests or held talks. In 1956, he served as simultaneous interpreter at the 8th National Congress of the Chinese Communist Party. He also visited Japan with delegations led by Guo Moruo, Wang Zhen and Ba Jin, respectively.

In 1964, as a reporter of Guangming Daily, he became one of the first Chinese journalists stationed in Japan. From September 1964 to June 1974, he was the first reporter of Guangming Daily in Tokyo, Japan. From June 1972 to June 1978, he was the chief journalist of the Tokyo Branch of Xinhua News Agency. In 1986, he was promoted to vice-minister of the Ministry of Culture of the People's Republic of China.

Later, he served as president of the Chinese-Japanese Society and president of the Chinese Cultural Fellowship.

On November 19, 2018, he was awarded the Lifetime Achievement Award in Translation, one of the most prestigious translation prizes in China.

== Works ==
- 风雨几星霜：战后中日关系亲历记 [Storms and Storms: Experiences of Sino-Japanese Relations after World War II] (in Chinese). Beijing: Joint Publishing. 2018. ISBN 9787108062802.
- 我为领袖当翻译：亲历中日高层往来 [I Translate for Leaders: Experience High-level Exchanges Between China and Japan] (in Chinese). Liaoning: Liaoning People's Publishing House. 2012.
- 难忘的岁月 [Unforgettable Years] (in Japanese). Beijing: Zhenghai Media Press. 2007. ISBN 9787508511504.

== Awards ==
- 23 June 2000 2nd Class, Order of the Rising Sun
- 2003 International Exchange Meritorious Person Award
