= Pan Handian =

Chinese legal scholar and translator (1920–2019)

- Traditional Chinese: 潘漢典
- Simplified Chinese: 潘汉典
Transcriptions
Standard Mandarin
- Hanyu Pinyin: Pān Hàndiǎn
- IPA: [pʰán xân.tjɛ̀n]

Alternative Chinese name
- Chinese: 潘宗洵
Transcriptions
Standard Mandarin
- Hanyu Pinyin: Pān Zōngxún

Pan Handian (Chinese: 潘汉典; 3 December 1920 – 26 October 2019), also known as Pan Zongxun (潘宗洵), was a Chinese legal scholar, translator, and writer. He was recognized as a founder of comparative law in China. He served as Professor and Director of the Institute of Comparative Law at China University of Political Science and Law, and editor-in-chief of the Journal of Comparative Law. He was conferred the Lifetime Achievement Award in Translation by the Translators Association of China in 2012.

== Early life and education ==
Pan Handian was born on 3 December 1920 in Shantou, Guangdong, Republic of China, and grew up in Guangzhou, where he studied at Pui Ching Middle School. His grandfather, Pan Wenduo (潘文铎), was an official in the Qing dynasty court, and his father, Pan Chengxiu (潘澄修), was an attorney who served as head of the Shantou Attorney Association.

Influenced by his father, Pan studied law at Soochow University in Shanghai. During the Second Sino-Japanese War, the university was forced to move four times. When his mother died in Hong Kong in 1942, Pan was unable to attend her funeral because of the war. In 1943, he published the thesis "A preliminary study of ancient Chinese legal thoughts". He excelled in foreign languages and became proficient in English, French, German, and Japanese. He later taught himself Russian and Italian. After the end of the war, he earned a master's degree from Soochow University Law School in 1948.

== Career ==
In 1948, Pan joined the faculty of Kwang Hua University (now part of East China Normal University), beginning his 70-year career in jurisprudence. He later taught at Soochow University, Peking University, Beijing College of Political Science and Law (now China University of Political Science and Law), and Institute of Law, Chinese Academy of Social Sciences. He served as the inaugural director of the Institute of Comparative Law at China University of Political Science and Law, and editor-in-chief of the Journal of Comparative Law (比较法研究) and Translation of Law (法学译丛).

Pan is widely recognized as a founder of comparative law in China. He studied the origin and social impact of the ancient Chinese text Canon of Laws, and considered it as influential as the earlier Code of Hammurabi of Babylon. When he was nearly 80, he accepted an invitation to serve as one of the chief editors of English-Chinese Dictionary of Anglo-American Law (元照英美法词典). After several years of work, the dictionary was published in 2003 and has become a key reference work for students of law in China. It has been reprinted many times.

Pan translated many works into Chinese, notably The Prince by Niccolò Machiavelli. To produce a more accurate translation than existing versions, he studied Italian and consulted 13 different translations of the work in English, French, German, and Japanese. The translation, which took 27 years to complete, was published in 1985. He also translated Introduction to Comparative Law by Konrad Zweigert and Hein Kötz, and many other works in law. In 2012, the Translators Association of China honoured him with the Lifetime Achievement Award in Translation.

Pan died on 26 October 2019, aged 98.
