= He Zhaowu =

Chinese historian (1921–2021)

- 何兆武
- Born: September 14, 1921; Beijing, China
- Died: May 28, 2021 (aged 99); Beijing, China
- Occupations: Historian, translator

Academic background
- Education: National Southwestern Associated University

Academic work
- Discipline: Philosophy of history
- Sub-discipline: History of Western Philosophy
- Institutions: Tsinghua University

He Zhaowu (Chinese: 何兆武; pinyin: Hé Zhàowǔ; September 14, 1921 – May 28, 2021) was a Chinese historian, translator, and professor at Tsinghua University. He was proficient in English, French and German.

== Biography ==
He was born in Beijing, on September 14, 1921, while his ancestral home was in Yueyang, Hunan. In 1939, he was accepted to the National Southwestern Associated University, where he graduated in 1943. From 1956 to 1986, he worked at the Chinese Academy of Social Sciences as an assistant research fellow and then research fellow. In 1986, he joined the faculty of Tsinghua University. He was a guest professor at Columbia University and the University of Marburg. He died in Beijing, on May 28, 2021, aged 99.

== Works ==
- 中国思想发展史 [History of Chinese Thought Development] (in Chinese). Wuhan, Hubei: Hubei People's Publishing House. 2007. ISBN 9787216051354.
- 上学记 [Biography of Going to School] (in Chinese). Beijing: Joint Publishing. 2006. ISBN 9787108025104.

== Translations ==
- Bertrand Russell (1963). A History of Western Philosophy (in Chinese). Beijing: Commercial Press. ISBN 9787100004824.
- Jean-Jacques Rousseau (2003). The Social Contract (in Chinese). Beijing: Commercial Press. ISBN 9787100037259.
- Immanuel Kant (2014). Critical Essays on Historical Rationality (in Chinese). Tianjin: Tianjin People's Publishing House. ISBN 9787201086415.
- Edmund Burke (2010). Reflections on the Revolution in France (in Chinese). Beijing: Commercial Press. ISBN 9787100032490.
- Blaise Pascal (1985). Pensées (in Chinese). Beijing: Commercial Press. ISBN 9787100022842.

== Awards ==
- 2015 Lifetime Achievement Award in Translation
