= Lin Wusong =

Chinese translator (1928–2021)

- 林戊荪
- Born: 1928; Tianjin, China
- Died: 27 January 2021 (aged 92–93)
- Occupation: Translator
- Writing career
- Language: Chinese, English
- Period: 1950s–2021
- Genres: Novel, historical texts
- Notable work: The Art of War
- Notable awards: Lifetime Achievement Award in Translation (2011)

Lin Wusun (simplified Chinese: 林戊荪; traditional Chinese: 林戊蓀; pinyin: Lín Wùsūn; 1928 – 27 January 2021) was a Chinese translator. He was the President of China International Publishing Group between 1988 and 1993, the Executive Vice-President of the Translators Association of China between 1992 and 2004, the Chief Editor of Chinese Translators Journal between 2002 and 2005.

== Biography ==
Lin was born in 1928 in Tianjin. He studied English in Tianjin, Shanghai, and Calcutta.

In 1946, Lin went to study in the United States.

In 1950, Lin returned to China, he served as the president of China International Publishing Group between 1988 and 1993, he became the executive vice-president of the Translators Association of China between 1992 and 2004. In 1992, he was appointed the chief editor of Chinese Translators Journal. He died on 27 January 2021 at the age of 92.

== Translations ==
- The Art of War (Sun Tzu) (Chinese: 孙子兵法)
- Sun Bin's Art of War (Sun Bin) (Chinese: 孙膑兵法)
- Analects (Confucius) (Chinese: 论语)
- Nanking Massacre (Chinese: 南京大屠杀)
- Tibetan (Chinese: 西藏)
- Precious Historical Treasures of the Potala Palace (Chinese: 布达拉宫珍宝)
- Silk Road (Chinese: 丝绸之路)

== Awards ==
Lin was awarded the Lifetime Achievement Award in Translation in 2011.
