= Beijing Publishing House =

Chinese state publishing house

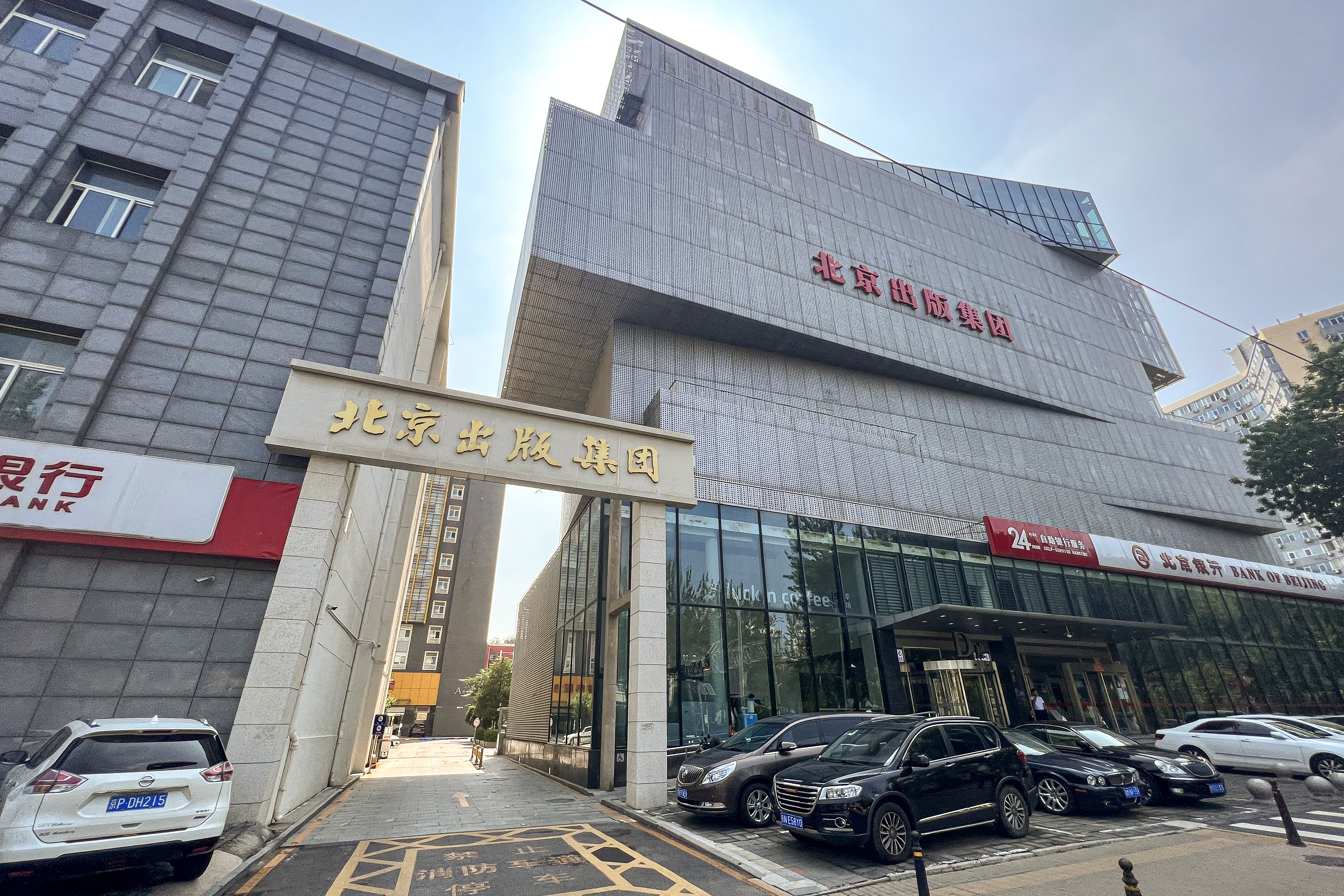
Headquarters

Beijing Publishing House (Chinese: 北京出版社; pinyin: Běijīng Chūbǎnshè) is a comprehensive publishing house in Beijing, People's Republic of China. Its history is tracible to 1948, when Dazhong Bookstore was founded. It is now one of the top 100 book publishing companies in China.

Under Beijing Publishing House, quite a number of subsidiary publishers were successively established, including Beijing Ancient Books Publishing House, Beijing Tourism Publishing House, Beijing Children's Publishing House, Beijing October Literature and Art Publishing House, Beijing Education Publishing House, Beijing Fine Arts and Photography Publishing House and Wenjin Publishing House. In addition, it edited and published magazines such as Shiyue (October), Youth Science Pictorial, Parents Must Read, and College Students.

== History ==
In 1948, the Peking Dazhong Bookstore, a store in front and a factory in the back 2-in-one, was established as a communication station for the underground work of the Chinese Communist Party (CCP).

After the founding of the People's Republic of China in 1949, the Peking Dazhong Bookstore was renamed "Beijing Dazhong Publishing House".

In 1956, "Beijing Publishing House" was established on the basis of Beijing Dazhong Publishing House.

After a long suspension because of the Cultural Revolution (1966–1976), the publishing house was resumed in 1978. In August, the large-scale literary journal Shiyue (October) was founded by Beijing Publishing House.

In 1979, Beijing Publishing House launched the youth science comic magazine Youth Science Pictorial. In the same year, Beijing Ancient Books Publishing House, a professional sub-brand of Chinese ancient books, was established, which was the first professional sub-brand of Beijing Publishing House.

In 1980, the family education magazine Parents Must Read was founded by Beijing Publishing House, which was going to influence the parenting life of generations in China.

In the following more than ten years, Beijing Tourism Publishing House, Beijing Children's Publishing House, Beijing October Literature and Art Publishing House, Beijing Education Publishing House, Beijing Fine Arts Photography Publishing House, Wenjin Publishing House, and Beijing Electronic Audio-Visual Publishing House were successively established by Beijing Publishing House.

In 1999, with the approval of the State Press and Publication Administration, Beijing Publishing House Group was established.

In 2008, Beijing Ancient Books Publishing House was abolished and renamed "Beijing People's Publishing House".

On May 28, 2009, Beijing Publishing Group was restructured into a state-owned company, Beijing Publishing Group Co., Ltd. In the same year, the company was rated as a national first-class publishing house by the General Administration of Press and Publication and was awarded the title of "Top 100 Book Publishing Units in China". It was also awarded the honorary title of "Favourite Publishing House among Farmer Readers".

In 2023, Beijing October Literature and Art Publishing House's "Baoshui" and October magazine's first publication of "Benba" won the 11th Mao Dun Literature Prize.

In 2024, 53 textbooks in 5 subjects of Beijing Publishing Group were selected into the "2024 Compulsory Education National Curriculum Teaching Book Catalog". In December 2024, book "Ana Riverbank" was selected for the 17th Spiritual Civilization Construction "Five One Project" Award.

== Current situation ==
Beijing Publishing Group, located at No. 6, North Third Ring Road, Beijing, has been publishing in the fields of humanities and social sciences, literature, children, natural sciences, life, art, education, etc. Since its establishment, it has won the National Top 100 Book Publishers and Beijing Going Out Pilot Enterprises, etc. more than 2,000 awards. At present. BPG has eight professional publishing houses, five magazines and eleven subsidiaries with near 900 employees. The group publishes more than 3,000 new books, periodicals and various electronic publications each year.

Beijing Publishing Group has established a good partnership with publishers from over 50 countries and regions. And books published by Beijing Publishing Group are also available on the international market.
