= Sino-French University =

The Sino-French University (Français: l'Université Franco-Chinoise) was an international university situated in Beijing, China, from 1920 to 1951. It is not to be confused with its reciprocal, the Sino-French Institute (Français: l'Institut Franco-Chinois), in Lyon, France.

== School history ==
=== Republican era ===
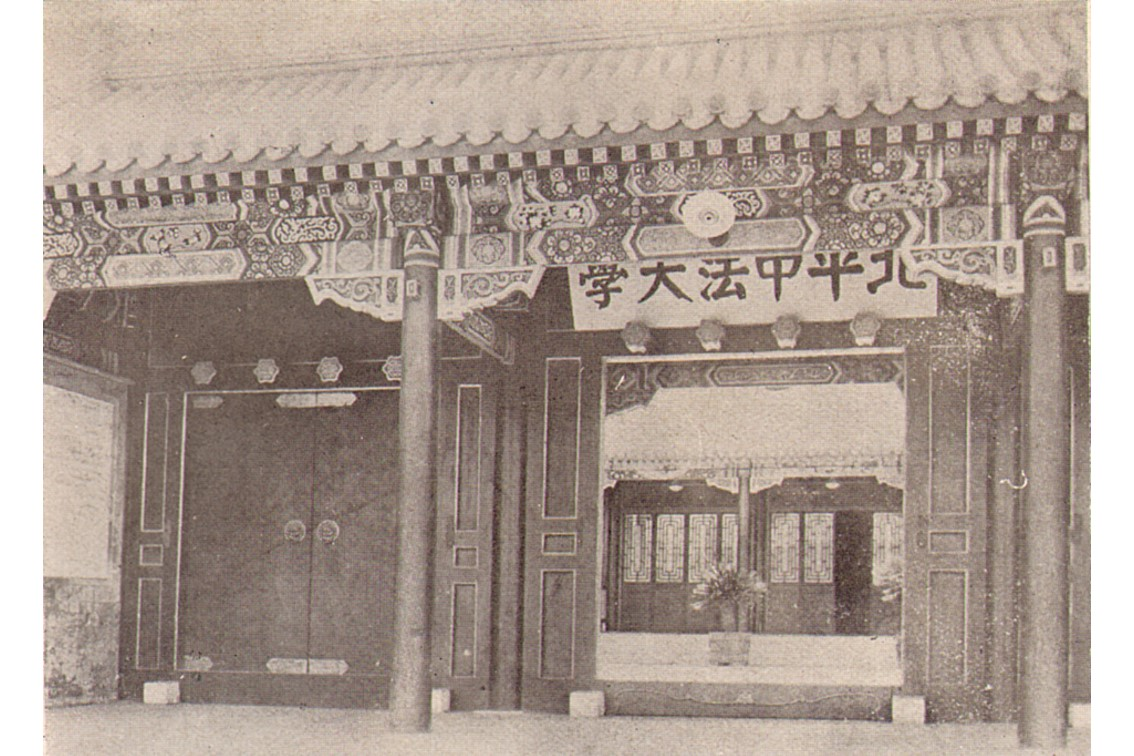
Front door of the University

The university was founded in 1920 in the hope of deepening Sino-French ties and cultivating a French influence in the capital city. With aid from French funds, Chinese intellectuals such as Li Shizeng and Zhang Jingjiang expanded the original Xishan Biological Research Center to form the university. Within 5 years time, at around 1925, it had already profited enough to relocate to the city center; soon, one year later, they earned approval from the Chinese Ministry of Education.

Said university then proceeded to establish numerous campuses around the city, for instance the Comte Campus of Philosophy at Fuchengmen, the Voltaire Campus of Humanities and Literature, the Curie Campus of Physics and Chemistry, as well as the Lamarck Campus of Biology. Amongst them, the Curie Campus would develop its very own subordinate for specialized research on the radioactive chemical element radium, which the namesake of this school had discovered at Paris-Sorbonne.

The decline of the university was marked by the outbreak of total war between China and invading Japanese forces in 1937 following the Marco-Polo Bridge incident. The puppet Japanese government mandated the university to cease all operations, to which the then-president Cai Yuanpei (also president of Peking University) outright refused. The institution fled to Kunming to restart, joining a band of other fleeing institutions named "National Southwestern Associated University".

After the end of World War 2 in 1945, the institution relocated back to Beijing, where educational and financial resources continued to dry up as Nationalist and Communist forces clashed in the Chinese Civil War.

In 1946, the Humanities, Sciences, and Medical departments admitted their last batch of students in Beijing.

=== Communist era ===
Soon after the establishment of the People's Republic of China, the Sino-French University was renamed the "Beijing National Sino-French University". Following the last students' graduation in 1950, the university began to gradually cease its operations. In March, the Economics and Biology department merged with Nankai University. During summer of the same year, the Beijing campuses merged with Huabei University. The Humanities and French Literature departments merged with Peking University. STEM students were also given the choice to follow suite. The affiliated property of the University, including but not limited to its high schools, primary schools, and farms, were ceded to the Beijing Municipal People's Government.

The Sino-French University officially ceased all operations by the end of 1950.
