= Li Shijun =

- 李士俊
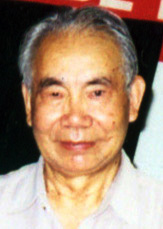
- Li Shijun
- Born: March 29, 1923; Anguo, Hebei, China
- Died: November 10, 2012 (aged 89); Beijing, China
- Education: Ji'nan No.1 High School; National Sichuan No.6 High School
- Occupations: Translator, author, editor
- Writing career
- Pen name: Luo Lun (罗伦); Meng Ling (孟凌); Laŭlum
- Language: Chinese, Esperanto
- Period: 1964–2007
- Genres: Poetry, novel
- Notable work: Four Great Classical Novels
- Notable awards: Grabowshi Prize (2003); Chinese Translation Culture Lifetime Achievement Award (2010)

Li Shijun (Chinese: 李士俊; pinyin: Lǐ Shìjùn; 29 March 1923 – 10 November 2012), also known by his Esperanto pseudonym Laŭlum, was a Chinese author, editor and translator who elected as a committee member of Akademio de Esperanto since 1983 and reelected in 1992, 2001 and 2010. He was a member of the China Democratic League.

He was among the first few in China who translated the Chinese literature into Esperanto.

== Life ==
Li was born into a family of farming background in the village of Shatou (沙头村), Anguo in Hebei province, on March 29, 1923.

At the age of 11, Li went to study in Ji'nan No.1 High School (济南一中), he lived in Ji'nan with his elder brother.

During the Second Sino-Japanese War, he studied in National Sichuan No.6 High School (国立四川六中), at the school, he got in touch with Esperanto.

Li started to learn Esperanto in 1939.

In 1946, Li founded the Chengdu Esperanto Association (成都世界语协会) with his teacher Xu Shouzhen (许寿真) and he served as secretary, then he founded a newspaper Jurnalisto (新闻记者).

From 1946 to 1950, Li worked in Chengdu, Renshou, Jianwei, Ziyang, Yibin, and Huayang.

In 1948, his teacher Xu Shouzhen was killed by the Nanking National Government.

After the founding of the Communist State, Li went to Beijing, helping organize the China Esperanto Association.

In October 1950, he was appointed an editor and translator in (中国报道) Publishing Company.

In 1983, Li was elected the president of Akademio de Esperanto.

In 1984, Li served as a member of the International Esperanto Association.

From 1957 to 1995, Li was a guest professor at Renmin University of China, Beijing Foreign Studies University, Shanghai International Studies University, Qingdao University, and Communication University of China.

Li was honored with the Grabowshi Prize in the 88th World Congress of Esperanto in 2003.

On December 10, 2010, he was honored the Chinese Translation Culture Lifetime Achievement Award, one of the most prestigious translation prizes in China.

== Works (translated and/or edited) ==
- Selections of Chinese Classical Novels (中国古代小说选)
- Selections of Chinese Literature (中国文学作品选集)
- Selections of Lu Xun (Lu Xun) (鲁迅小说集)
- Midnight (Mao Dun) (子夜)
- Wang Gui and Li Xiangxiang (Li Ji) (王贵与李香香)
- Cold Night (Ba Jin) (寒夜)
- The Family (Ba Jin) (家)
- Autumn in Spring (Ba Jin) (春天里的秋天)
- Poetry of Li Bai (Li Bai) (李白诗选)
- Poetry of Du Fu (Du Fu) (杜甫诗选)
- Selections of Tang Poetry (唐诗选)
- Water Margin (Shi Nai'an) (水浒传)
- Romance of the Three Kingdoms (Luo Guanzhong) (三国演义)
- Journey to the West (Wu Cheng'en) (西游记)
- (孔雀东南飞)
- Strange Stories from a Chinese Studio (Pu Songling) (聊斋志异选)

== Awards ==
- Grabowshi Prize (2003)
- Chinese Translation Culture Lifetime Achievement Award (2010)
