= Gao Mang =

Chinese translator

- 高莽
- Born: 1926; Harbin, Heilongjiang, China
- Died: October 6, 2017 (aged 90–91); China
- Education: YMCA of Harbin
- Occupations: Translator, painter
- Writing career
- Pen name: Wulanhan (乌兰汗)
- Language: Chinese, Russian
- Period: 1943–2017
- Genres: Novel, poetry
- Notable work: Poetry of Pushkin

Gao Mang (Chinese: 高莽; pinyin: Gāo Mǎng; 1926 – 6 October 2017) also known by his pen name Wulanhan (乌兰汗; 烏蘭汗; Wū Lánhán), was a Chinese translator and painter who had been honored by the governments of both Russia and China.

He was one of the main translators of the works of the Russian poets Alexander Pushkin, Ivan Bunin, Mikhail Lermontov and Anna Akhmatova into Chinese. His translation of Anna Akhmatova's Requiem had won the Russian-Chinese Translator Prize in 2013.

== Biography ==
Gao was born in Harbin, Heilongjiang in 1926, his mother was an illiterate in the old society.

Gao primarily studied at a Russian school and he was a graduate of the YMCA of Harbin.

After graduation, Gao started to publish works in 1943.

Gao worked in the Harbin Sino-Soviet Friendship Association as an editor and translator.

After the founding of the Communist State, Gao worked in Beijing Sino-Soviet Friendship Association in 1954, at the same year, he joined the China Writers Association.

In 1964, Gao was transferred to the Chinese Academy of Social Sciences, he retired in 1989.

Gao received an honorary doctorate degree from the Russian Academy of Sciences.

== Works ==
- Russian Literature and Me (我与俄罗斯文学)
- How Long It is Since We Last Met, Moscow (久违了，莫斯科)
- Kulimu (枯立木)
- Trip to Shengshan (圣山行)
- Essays of Russian Art (俄罗斯美术随笔)
- Essays of Life (人生笔记)
- Mohen (墨痕)

== Translations ==
- Poetry of Pushkin (Alexander Pushkin) (普希金诗集)
- Desolation Angels (Jack Kerouac) (孤独天使)
- Poetry of Lermontov (Mikhail Lermontov) (莱蒙托夫诗集)
- Poetry of Bunin (Ivan Bunin) (蒲宁诗集)
- Poetry of Anna Akhmatova (Anna Akhmatova) (安娜·阿赫玛托娃诗集)
- The Bug (Vladimir Mayakovsky) (臭虫)
- The Bath (Vladimir Mayakovsky) (澡堂)
- Early life of Carl Marx (卡尔·马克思青年时代)

== Awards ==
Gao was honored the Medal of the Friendship between China and Russia in 1997, he received the Medal of Friendly Relationship between China and Russia and the Medal of Friendly Relationship between Russia and China in 1999. Gao won the Russian-Chinese Translator Prize for translating Anna Akhmatova's Requiem in 2013.
