= Yi Zuolin =

Chinese linguist, educator and philanthropist

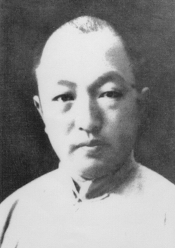
- Yi Zuolin ca. 1930
- Born: July 19, 1897 Nantong, Great Qing
- Died: March 29, 1945 (aged 47) Rugao, China
- Occupation: linguist, educator, philanthropist
- Spouse: Wu Jiejun (1904–2000)

Yi Zuolin
- Chinese: 易作霖
Transcriptions
Standard Mandarin
- Hanyu Pinyin: Yì Zuòlín
- Gwoyeu Romatzyh: Yih Tzuohlin
- Wade–Giles: I Tso-lin

Yi Zuolin (July 19, 1897 – March 29, 1945), a.k.a. Yi Jianlou, was a Chinese linguist, educator and philanthropist. He made important pioneering contributions to the studies of modern Chinese phonetics, phonology and grammar.

== Biography ==
Yi Zuolin was born in 1897 to a scholar family in Nantong, Jiangsu Province of China. As a child, he was quick to learn and well versed in Chinese classics. He later attended and graduated from China's first privately funded teachers' college – Tongzhou Teachers’ College. In 1920, he worked as an editor for Chung Hwa Book Company – one of the earliest and best known publishers in China. The following year, he worked as a professor for Shanghai National Language College (上海國語專修學校). In 1923, he was appointed by the Preparatory Committee for the Unification of the National Language (國語統一籌備委員會) as a member of the Committee for National Language Romanization (國語羅馬字母拼音研究委員會), along with 10 other nationally renowned scholars including Lin Yutang, Yuen Ren Chao et al. His academic career culminated with the publication in 1924 of Four Lectures on Chinese Grammar, one of the best grammars of modern Chinese.

Later he faded out of the academia, and pursued a career in education and charity. He served as a principal first of an elementary school and then of a secondary school. Later he served as a school inspector first for Nantong County and then for Jiangsu Province. He would travel to various schools throughout the province to ensure high quality education. His effort helped make Jiangsu one of the most educationally advanced provinces in the nation.

In 1930, along with 18 other local educators and celebrities, he helped create a charity organization known as Nantong Poor Children’s Home, where children from poor families apprenticed in exchange for basic education. He actively supported and helped this organization until Nantong fell under Japanese occupation in 1938.

During the Sino-Japanese war, he refused to cooperate with the Japanese occupation forces and their collaborators. He followed the retreating provincial government and continued to work in areas of northern Jiangsu that had not fallen into enemy hands. As the war went on, more and more schools were closed. To at least help some students go to school, in 1943, he single-handedly reopened Chongjing Secondary School in Jiangyan. He served as the principal and the chairman of the board of trustees. He invited many of his friends and well-known teachers to join him in his effort. He helped create the school curriculum and procure or develop teaching materials. He created the school motto “Self-reliance in adversity and loyalty with honesty”. He personally taught the Chinese language class, and he would lead the students every day in their morning exercises.

Two years of extremely hard work took a toll on his health. He succumbed to a terminal disease in 1945 and died in a taxi boat in Rugao on his way from Jiangyan back to Nantong, a few months before the Sino-Japanese war would end. The following year, 24 local VIPs issued a proclamation and set up a memorial committee in his honor. They referred to him as a “giant man of letters and a renowned master of education”, and they called upon the government to 1. Recognize and honor his professional services and patriotic deeds; 2. Restore Nantong Poor Children’s Home and rename it after him; 3. Protect his grave and build a memorial; and 4. Financially help his widow to raise his children. They launched a fund-raising campaign to help promote these measures.

== Family ==
Yi Zuolin’s father was Yi Yao (爻), a.k.a. Yi Qianliu (謙六), a scholar working for the Tongzhou Naval Base. His mother was Wang Shuyan (王述嚴), a graduate of Tungchou Women Teachers’ College. Both of them have died. He had four siblings: brother Chi-tang (繼唐), a.k.a. Tzu-chao (自昭); brother Ting (鼎), a.k.a. Chi-heng (企衡); sister Chuan (專), a.k.a. Ching-yi (靜儀); sister Mo (末), a.k.a. Tsang-su (滄粟). All his siblings have died.

Yi married Wu Jiejun (吳潔君, 1904–2000) in 1921. They had five children: daughter Yü (愚), son Tan (坦), daughter Lu (魯), son Lieh (烈), and son Hsi (洒). His wife died in April, 2000, survived by all their children.

== Academic work ==
Yi Zuolin started his academic career as a young activist of the National Language Unification Movement and the New Culture Movement. He actively participated in the propagation and education of the newly established Standard Mandarin (標準國語). While teaching, he systematically studied all the phonetic and grammatical characteristics of Standard Mandarin. Rather than blindly fitting Chinese language materials into linguistic models based on western languages, he would apply principles of western linguistic science while studying these materials and make generalizations based on his observations. He was thus able to make discoveries other scholars of his time failed to see.

In 1920, at the age of 23, he published his first scholarly work Lectures on Chinese Phonetics (國音學講義). A year later it was designated by the Ministry of Education as a standard reference book for students learning the Mandarin phonetic system in all schools nationwide. The Chinese vowel diagrams seen in this book are the first ever created by a Chinese scholar, and they are very much comparable to the cardinal vowel diagram created by Daniel Jones three years before.

In 1921, he published an important paper On Five Tones (五聲論). He argued that tones are an indispensable part of the Chinese phonetic system. For the first time ever, he created the method of describing tones with a tonal contour “based on the scale of the musical staff”. This can be seen as the precursor to Yuen Ren Chao’s invention of tone letter in 1930. His method is still widely used today in phonetic studies of tonal languages.

In 1924, he published his second scholarly work Four Lectures on Chinese Grammar (國語文法四講). This book was ahead of its time in the classification and structural analysis of phrases, in the exposition and differentiation of sentences with seemingly identical structures, and in the recognition, classification and analysis of embedded sentences. It would be decades before analytical techniques frequently used in this book, such as analysis of semantic property, analysis of semantic orientation, transformational analysis, etc. became commonplace in the literature of Chinese syntactic research.

With his respectable academic achievements, Yi became a Chinese linguist of the same caliber as Li Jinxi, Yuen Ren Chao, Lin Yutang et al.

== Publications ==
- (1920). Lectures on Chinese Phonetics [國音學講義]. Commercial Press. Shanghai. Republished in 2010, Taiwan Commercial Press, Taipei.
- (1920). The Phonetic Reader [國音讀本]. Chung Hwa Book Company. Shanghai.
- (1921). On the Five Tones [五聲論]. In Education in China [中華教育界], vol. 10, no. 8, pp. 1–14.
- (1921). On the Nantong Phonetic Alphabet [南通語音字母說明書]. In Education in China [中華教育界], vol. 11, no. 2, pp. 1–16.
- (1924). Four Lectures on Chinese Grammar [國語文法四講]. Chung Hwa Book Company. Shanghai.
