= Yi Lijun =

Chinese translator (1934–2022)

- 易丽君
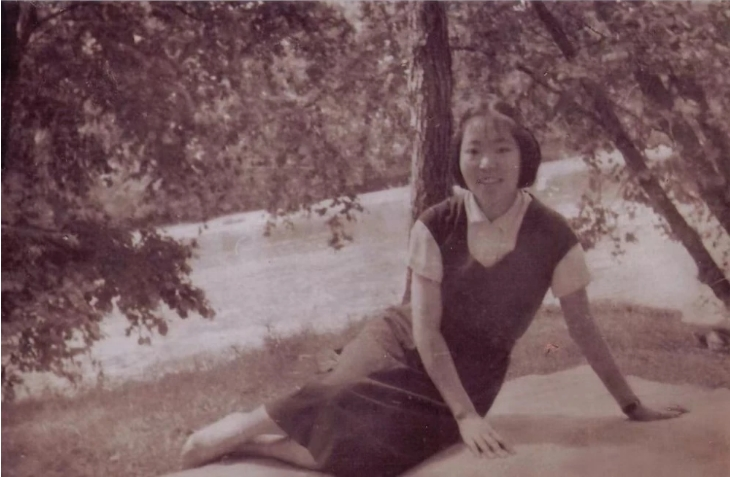
- In 1956, Yi Lijun was in the suburb of Warsaw, Poland
- Born: 4 December 1934; Huanggang, Hubei, China
- Died: 7 February 2022 (aged 87); Beijing, China
- Education: Wuhan University; Warsaw University
- Occupation: Translator
- Spouse: Yuan Hanrong
- Writing career
- Pen name: Han Yi (韩逸)
- Language: Chinese, Polish
- Period: 1970–2022
- Notable work: The Knights of the Cross
- Notable awards: Lifetime Achievement Award in Translation (2018)

Yi Lijun (simplified Chinese: 易丽君; traditional Chinese: 易麗君; pinyin: Yì Lìjūn; 4 December 1934 – 7 February 2022), also known by her pen name Han Yi (韩逸; 韓逸; Hán Yì), was a Chinese translator who had been honored by the Polish Government.

Yi was one of the foremost translators of Polish fiction. For her contributions to the introduction of Polish literature to foreign readers, she was honoured with the Polish Literature Order, the Knight's Cross (2010), the Outstanding Contribution to Promote Polish Literature Award (2007) and the Transatlantic Prize.

== Biography ==
Yi was born in Huanggang, Hubei on 4 December 1934. She started publishing her works in 1952.

In 1954, after graduating from Wuhan University, she was sent abroad to study at the expense of the government, she entered Warsaw University, where she majored in Polish language and literature.

In 1962, Yi returned to China. She taught Polish at the Department of East European Language, Beijing Foreign Studies University.

Yi joined the China Writers Association in 1988.

=== Personal life and death ===
Yi was married to a Chinese physicist, Yuan Hanrong (袁汉镕), he also was a graduate of Warsaw University.

Yi died in Beijing on 7 February 2022, at the age of 87.

== Works ==
- The History of Poland Literature (波兰战后文学史)
- Poland Literature (波兰文学)

== Translations ==
- The Knights of the Cross (十字军骑士)
- With Fire and Sword (火与剑)
- The Deluge (洪流)
- The Captive Mind (Czeslaw Milosz) (被禁锢的头脑)
- (弗沃迪约夫斯基先生)
- (太古和其他的时间)
- (收集梦的剪贴簿)
- Pan Tadeusz (塔杜施先生)
- (Adam Mickiewicz) (先人祭)
- Glory and Vainglory (Jarosław Iwaszkiewicz) (名望与光荣)
- Ferdydurke (Witold Gombrowicz) (费尔迪杜凯)

== Awards ==
- Polish Literature Order
- Polish National Education Committee Order
- The Knight's Cross (2000), by Polish President Aleksander Kwaśniewski
- Bing Xin Literature Prize
- National Book Award
- Outstanding Contribution to Promote Polish Literature Award (2007), by the Polish Foreign Minister
- The Cross of Military Officers of the Republic of Poland (2011), by Polish President Bronisław Komorowski
- Transatlantic Prize (2012)
- Lifetime Achievement Award in Translation (2018)
