= China-Russia Friendship Association =

Organization in People's Republic of China

The China-Russia Friendship Association (CRAFA, Chinese: 中国俄罗斯友好协会), affiliated with the Chinese People's Association for Friendship with Foreign Countries, is an official civil diplomatic organization established by the Government of the People's Republic of China. It is an official civil diplomatic organization established by the Government of the People's Republic of China between the People's Republic of China and the Russian Federation. Its predecessor was the Sino-Soviet Friendship Association/China-Soviet Union Friendship Association, founded on October 5, 1949, or CRAFA for short.

== History ==
=== China-Soviet Union Friendship Association ===
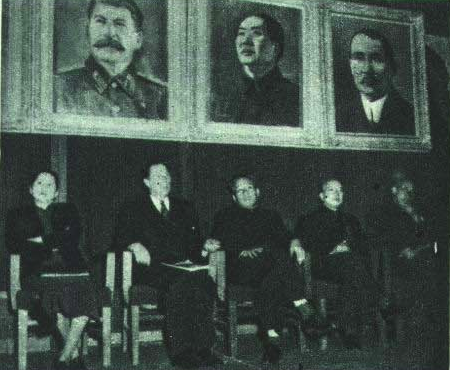
On October 5, 1950, the first anniversary of the founding of the Sino-Soviet Friendship Association, attended by Soong Ching Ling, Luoshin, Liu Shaoqi and Li Jishen.

Before the establishment of the People's Republic of China, the Communist regime of China held the launching meeting of the Sino-Soviet Friendship Association in Huairen Hall, Zhongnanhai, Beiping. According to the constitution of the association, the first "leadership core" was elected by the inaugural meeting, with Liu Shaoqi as president, Song Qingling, Wu Yuzhang, Shen Junru, Li Jishen, Guo Moruo, Zhang Lan and Huang Yanpei as vice-presidents, and the director-general, Qian Junrui, designated as the director-general. By April 1950, the Association had established branches in most provinces of China. By October 1952, the Association had become the largest mass organization in China at that time, with a membership of 38.9 million, and by the beginning of 1953, the Association had more than 68 million members.

In the mid-to-late 1950s, the Association was also affected by the Sino-Soviet split, and in February 1960, the Publicity Department of the Chinese Communist Party handed over the General Party Group of the Association to the Foreign Affairs Office of the State Council. In August 1960, the Foreign Affairs Office of the State Council transferred the General Committee of the Association to the State Committee for Liaison with Foreign Cultures, which was renamed the Chinese People's Association for Friendship with Foreign Cultures (the predecessor of the Chinese People's Association for Friendship with Foreign Countries) and co-located with the General Committee of the Association in 1965, and on September 17, 1966, the Sino-Soviet Friendship Association was merged into the Chinese People's Association for Friendship with Foreign Countries. On September 17, 1966, the Sino-Soviet Friendship Association was renamed the Sino-Soviet People's Friendship Association under CPAFFC framework.

During the Cultural Revolution, the General Association was dissolved on its own. After the establishment of the Chinese People's Association for Friendship with Foreign Countries by the Ministry of Foreign Affairs of the People's Republic of China, the Association became one of its sub-groups and no longer retained its local organization, and in 1983 it resumed the exchange of visits with the Sino-Soviet Friendship Association. In 1984, the Sino-Soviet Friendship Association elected a new president, Qu Wu, vice-chairman of the National Committee of the Chinese People's Political Consultative Conference and chairman of the Central Committee of the Democratic Revolutionary Party.

=== China-Russia Friendship Association ===
After the collapse of the Soviet Union, it was renamed the China-Russia Friendship Association. On October 28, 2009, a conference celebrating the 60th anniversary of the China-Russia Friendship Association was held at the Moscow Institute of International Relations.

On March 18, 2011, the Fifth Council of the China-Russia Friendship Association was held in Beijing.

== See also ==
- Russia-China Friendship Association
