= Cao Ying (translator) =

Chinese translator (1923–2015)

Sheng Junfeng
- 盛峻峰
- Born: March 23, 1923; Zhenhai County, Zhejiang, China
- Died: October 25, 2015 (aged 92); Huadong Hospital, Shanghai, China
- Education: Nantong Agricultural College
- Occupations: Translator, professor
- Spouse: Sheng Tianmin
- Relatives: Xu Shujuan (mother)
- Writing career
- Pen name: Cao Ying (草婴)
- Language: Chinese, Russian
- Period: 1941–2015
- Genre: Novel
- Notable work: The Complete Works of Leo Tolstoy
- Notable awards: Maxim Gorky Literature Prize (1987); Lu Xun Literary Prize (1997); Chinese Translation Association – Lifetime Honorary Award (2011)

Sheng Junfeng (Chinese: 盛峻峰; pinyin: Shèng Jùnfēng; March 23, 1923 – October 25, 2015), better known by his pen name Cao Ying (草婴/草嬰; Cǎo Yīng), was a Chinese translator.

Sheng was one of the main translators of the works of Russian novelists Leo Tolstoy and Mikhail Sholokhov into Chinese. In 1987, he was honored by the Government of the Russian Federation with the Maxim Gorky Literature Prize. He was the only Chinese translator to have won that award.

== Biography ==
Born in a wealthy family in Zhenhai County, Kuaiji Dao, Zhejiang in 1923, both his grandfather and father were doctors. His mother, Xu Shujuan (徐书卷), was a daughter of an eminent family. His elder maternal cousin, Xu Xu (徐訏), was a romantic novelist. And his great-grandfather was the founder of Shengziji Soy Sauce Brewery (盛滋记酱油酿造厂), which participated in exhibition on Panama World's Fair in 1915. He graduated from The Lester School and Henry Lester Institute of Technical Education Attached School (雷士德工学院附属中学), Songjiang School (松江中学), and Nantong Agricultural College (南通农学院).

In December 1937, during the Second Sino-Japanese War, he moved to Shanghai with his family to escape the violence, by age 14.

In 1938, he started to learn Russian language under a Russian housewife and Jiang Chunfang (姜椿芳), who was a Russian literature translator and a member of the underground CPC of Shanghai.

He wrote under the pen name of Cao Ying in 1941.

From 1945 to 1951, he worked as an editor and translator in Time Publishing Company (时代出版社).

In 1956, he worked in Shanghai Writers Association.

In 1960, he started to translated The Complete Works of Leo Tolstoy into Chinese, at the same year, the Sino-Soviet Rupture, and he was brought to be persecuted.

In 1966, Mao Zedong launched the Cultural Revolution, he was regarded as "the agent of Sholokhov" and "a revisionist USSR spy", he suffered political persecution and he was sent to the May Seventh Cadre Schools to do farm work. He got gastrorrhagia in 1969 and he fractured his backbone in 1975.

After the reform and opening up, he was rehabilitated by Deng Xiaoping. He served as vice president of Chinese Translation Association, president of Shanghai Translation Association, vice president of Shanghai Writers Association. He became a professor at East China Normal University and Xiamen University.

From 1978 to 1998, he spent 20 years to translate The Complete Works of Leo Tolstoy into Chinese.

He joined the Russian Writer Association in 2006.

Cao died at Huadong Hospital in Shanghai, on October 25, 2015, at the age of 93.

== Works ==
- (Mikhail Sholokhov) (Chinese: 被开垦的处女地)
- Russian: Судьба человека (Chinese: 一个人的遭遇)
- And Quiet Flows the Don (Mikhail Sholokhov) (Chinese: 静静的顿河)
- The Complete Works of Leo Tolstoy (Leo Tolstoy) (Chinese: 列夫·托尔斯泰全集)
- War and Peace (Leo Tolstoy) (Chinese: 战争与和平)
- The Resurrection (Leo Tolstoy) (Chinese: 复活)
- Anna Karenina (Leo Tolstoy) (Chinese: 安娜·卡列尼娜)
- The Caucasus Story (Leo Tolstoy) (Chinese: 高加索故事)
- A Landlord's Morning (Leo Tolstoy) (Chinese: 一个地主的早晨)

== Awards ==
- Maxim Gorky Literature Prize (1987)
- Lu Xun Literary Prize (1997)
- China-Russia Friendship Award (1999)
- Chinese Translation Association - Senior Translator (2002)
- Maxim Gorky Souvenir Medal (2006)
- Chinese Translation Association - Lifetime Honorary Award (2011)
