= Kim Kyung-seon =

South Korean government official

- 김경선

Vice Minister of Gender Equality and Family
- In office 9 September 2020 – 12 May 2022
- President: Moon Jae-in
- Prime Minister: Chung Sye-kyun; Kim Boo-kyum
- Minister: Lee Jung-ok; Chung Young-ai
- Preceded by: Kim Hee-kyung
- Succeeded by: Lee Ki-soon

Personal details
- Born: 1969 (age 56–57)
- Education: Seoul National University; Indiana University

Kim Kyung-seon (Korean: 김경선; born 1969), also known as Kim Kyong-seon, is a South Korean bureaucrat serving as Vice Minister of Gender Equality and Family from September 2020 to 2022. She was previously the first woman to lead the Planning and Coordination Office of the Ministry of Employment and Labor.

Since 1992 when she passed the state exam, Kim has dedicated her career in public service mostly at Ministry of Employment and Labor (MOEL).

In September 2019 Kim was promoted as the head of the Planning and Coordination Office, the most senior office in any ministries. Kim holds two titles of being the first woman in MOEL - the first woman to lead this Office and previously the division/team, a subordinate organisation of a bureau.

Kim holds four degrees - a bachelor in English literature, a Master of Public Policy and a doctorate in law from Seoul National University and a master's in law from Indiana University.
