= Shanghai Book Fair =

Annual book fair held in Shanghai, China

上海书展 Shanghai Book Fair
- Status: Active
- Genre: Multiple
- Venue: Shanghai Exhibition Centre
- Location: Shanghai
- Country: China
- Inaugurated: 2004
- Organizer: Co-organised by the National Press and Publication Administration; Co-organised by the Shanghai Municipal People's Government; Hosted by the Publicity Department of the Shanghai Municipal Committee of the Chinese Communist Party and the Shanghai Municipal Bureau of Press and Publication; Co-hosted by the Jing'an District, Shanghai People's Government and Shanghai Exhibition Centre
- Website: shanghaibookfair-www.shbookfair.cn

The Shanghai Book Fair (Chinese: 上海书展) is a large-scale cultural event themed around reading held annually in Shanghai each August.

== History ==
The fair was founded in 2004. The Shanghai Municipal Bureau of Press and Publication renamed and expanded the Shanghai Book Trade Fair, which had begun in 2002, and from 2004 onwards opened it to the public with paid admission for book purchasing. The Shanghai Book Fair is jointly organised by the Shanghai Municipal People's Government and the National Radio and Television Administration, and is held at the Shanghai Exhibition Centre at 1000 Middle Yan'an Road.

== History of editions ==
=== 1981 Shanghai Book Market ===
The Shanghai Book Market was held from 6 to 20 September 1981 at the Technical Innovation Hall of the Shanghai Industrial Exhibition Centre (now Shanghai Centre) at 1376 West Nanjing Road, with a usable floor space of 3,500 square metres, and was organised by the Shanghai Xinhua Bookstore, with the Shanghai Bookstore and Shanghai Foreign Language Bookstore as co-organisers. The market featured seven exhibition halls: a comprehensive hall for literature, history, and philosophy; a hall for science, technology, and textbooks; a hall for Shanghai publications; a hall for publications from other provinces and cities; a music (audio cassette) hall; an antiquarian books hall; and a foreign books hall. Over 22,000 titles were exhibited. The market distributed 280,000 admission tickets, received 240,000 visitors, and sold 4 million volumes of books worth 2.4 million yuan. Opening hours were 8:00–11:00 in the morning and 14:00–17:00 in the afternoon, making it the only Shanghai book market to close at midday. Two evening sessions were also specially held during the market.

=== 1986 Shanghai Book Market ===
The Shanghai Book Market was held from 6 to 20 September 1986 in East Hall One of the Shanghai Exhibition Centre, jointly organised by the Shanghai Xinhua Bookstore together with Jiefang Daily, Wenhui Bao, Xinmin Evening News, Shanghai People's Radio Station, and Shanghai Television Station. Ten specialist halls were set up for this market. Some 30,000 titles were available. During the entire market, 200,000 visitors were received, and 2.5 million volumes of books worth 3.4 million yuan were sold at retail.

=== 1996 Shanghai Book Market ===
The first Shanghai Book Festival and 1996 Shanghai Book Market was held from 9 to 18 August 1996 at the Shanghai Exhibition Centre, organised by the Publicity Department of the Shanghai Municipal Committee of the CPC and the Shanghai Municipal Bureau of Press and Publication, and hosted by the Shanghai Xinhua Bookstore. Sixteen exhibition halls were set up for this market, with 100,000 titles including books, audio-visual products, and electronic publications from over 500 publishers nationwide, among them 20,000 audio-visual products and electronic publications.

Over 50 cultural activities were held inside and outside the venue during this market, including the first Conference on Chinese Publishing at the Turn of the Century, a Shanghai booksellers' campaign donating books for children everywhere, a symposium on the prospects for Shanghai publications to expand into the mainland market at the turn of the century, a lecture on new trends in electronic publishing, a display of covers of 100 Shanghai periodicals along with a selection of the best Shanghai periodical covers, and an exhibition of achievements in Shanghai publishing. The selection of the Top Ten Shanghai Book Collectors resulted in the following ten being named: Ye Zhonghao, Chen Zishan, Wu Juntao, Zhang Rongming, Jin Wenming, Tao Shunliang, Liang Guoqiang, Cao Zhengwen, Lan Fan, and Qu Yongfa.

The market received 300,000 visitors in total, with a peak daily attendance of 43,000. A total of 11 million yuan worth of various types of books were sold.

=== 1998 Shanghai Book Market ===
The second Shanghai Book Market was held from 30 December 1998 to 8 January 1999 at the newly opened Shanghai Book City, organised by the Shanghai Municipal Bureau of Press and Publication. Six bookstores served as co-hosts: the Shanghai Xinhua Bookstore, Shanghai Book City, Shanghai Book Company, Shanghai Foreign Book Company, China Science and Technology Book Company, and Shanghai Music Book Company. Simultaneously, sub-venues were opened at large bookstores and specialist bookstores on Fuzhou Road's Cultural Street, as well as at all Xinhua Bookstores across the city; a rural sub-venue was also set up in Jiading.

A total of 85 activities were organised for this book market. Shanghai Book City brought together 150,000 titles of books, periodicals, audio-visual products, and electronic publications. The entire market received 810,000 visitors and achieved total sales of 10.73 million yuan, of which Shanghai Book City alone accounted for 4.75 million yuan.

=== 2001 Shanghai Book Market ===
The Shanghai Reading Festival and the third Shanghai Book Market was held simultaneously from 28 December 2001 to 6 January 2002 at the newly opened Oriental Book City and the Oriental Publishing Transaction Centre in Pudong, organised by the Shanghai Invigorating China Reading Guidance Committee, and hosted by the Shanghai Municipal Bureau of Press and Publication, the Pudong New Area Culture and Broadcasting Administration Bureau, the Shanghai Book and Periodical Distribution Industry Association, and the Shanghai Xinhua Distribution Group.

The book market adopted the theme of "The fragrance of books fills the city", and launched five series of activities: the opening series for the Oriental Publishing Transaction Centre and Oriental Book City; the citywide exhibition series featuring dual-venue exhibitions at Oriental Book City and Shanghai Book City as the main battleground; the "Cultural Feast" series; the "Assisting Education and Cultivating Virtue" series; and the education lecture series. These included exhibitions at 200 bookstores citywide, a "Cultural Feast" special train departure, the sending of Spring Festival couplets to rural residents, an anti-piracy knowledge exhibition, a centenary retrospective of science and technology publishing, an exhibition of twentieth-century publishing achievements, and numerous book signing events.

Oriental Book City received 500,000 visitors for this book market. Citywide mainstream book sales reached 22,007,900 yuan.

=== 2004 Shanghai Book Fair ===
The 2004 Shanghai Book Fair and Shanghai Reading Festival was held from 28 July to 2 August 2004 at the Shanghai Exhibition Centre, organised by the Shanghai Municipal Bureau of Press and Publication. Over 130 publishers from 24 provinces and municipalities nationwide participated, with an exhibition area of 20,000 square metres. During the book fair, over 170 marketing activities were held, attracting 200,000 visitors and achieving retail sales of 13 million yuan.

=== 2005 Shanghai Book Fair ===
The 2005 Shanghai Book Fair was held from 6 to 14 August 2005 at the Shanghai Exhibition Centre, organised by the Shanghai Municipal Bureau of Press and Publication. The opening coincided with Typhoon Matsa. The theme of this edition was "Reading makes life more harmonious". It comprised 22 exhibition halls including the main thematic hall and the Shanghai Featured Books Exhibition Hall. Over 170 activities were held during the book fair. A total of 300,000 visitors were received, with retail sales of 25 million yuan.

=== 2006 Shanghai Book Fair ===
The 2006 Shanghai Book Fair was held from 5 to 11 August 2006 at the Shanghai Exhibition Centre, organised by the Shanghai Municipal Bureau of Press and Publication, with the Shanghai Exhibition Centre, Shanghai United Book Trade Exhibition Co., Ltd., and others as co-organisers. Prior to the fair, Shanghai United Book Trade Exhibition Co., Ltd. was established as a joint investment by 28 units in the Shanghai publishing industry, operating the Shanghai Book Fair through market-oriented methods. The theme of this edition was "I love reading, I love life". The total exhibition area reached 21,700 square metres, divided into 22 exhibition halls. Participating units including the China Publishing Group, Zhejiang Publishing United Group, and Jiangsu's Phoenix Publishing & Media Group presented 100,000 titles and 300 cultural activities, attracting over 200,000 readers from Shanghai and across the country. On-site book signings were held during the fair featuring Wang Meng, Yi Zhongtian, Zhou Haiying, Wang Anyi, Yang Lan, Ye Xin, and others. Total retail sales during the entire fair reached 28 million yuan.

=== 2007 Shanghai Book Fair ===
The 2007 Shanghai Book Fair was held from 15 to 21 August 2007 at the Shanghai Mart at 2299 West Yan'an Road, organised by the Shanghai Municipal Bureau of Press and Publication. The theme of this edition was "I love reading, I love life". Over 500 publishers from across the country participated. The exhibition area was 21,800 square metres, with 712 booths, and for the first time a manga and gaming hall was added. Over 100,000 titles were presented, including nearly 40,000 new titles and 12,000 original foreign-language books. Over 250 cultural activities were held. Nearly 200,000 people attended. Xi Jinping, then Secretary of the Shanghai Municipal Committee of the Chinese Communist Party, visited the 2007 Shanghai Book Fair on 20 August.

=== 2008 Shanghai Book Fair ===
The 2008 Shanghai Book Fair was held from 13 to 19 August 2008 at the Shanghai Mart. The theme of this edition was "I love reading, I love life". Over 260 cultural activities were held, achieving retail sales of 26 million yuan and group purchase sales of 21.63 million yuan, with nearly 220,000 readers attending. This edition provided over 100,000 titles, including over 60,000 new titles. A total of 406 publishers from Beijing, Anhui, Zhejiang, Jiangsu, Chongqing, Hubei, Guangxi, Jilin, Liaoning, Hunan, and other regions participated. This edition showcased three major themes: the 30th anniversary of reform and opening up, the Olympics, and earthquake relief, and organised activities across five categories: arts and culture, economics, education, health and sports, and leisure living. Over 40 titles held launch events at this edition. This edition of the Shanghai Book Fair was the first to introduce the Frankfurt Book Fair's concept of a "guest of honour country", establishing for the first time a "guest of honour province", with exhibition space provided free of charge. Anhui Province became the first-ever guest of honour province of the Shanghai Book Fair, with a focus on showcasing "100 Huizhou Culture Books", "100 Academic Books", "100 Bestselling Books", and selected audio-visual products recently published by the Anhui Publishing Group.

=== 2009 Shanghai Book Fair ===
The 2009 Shanghai Book Fair was held from 13 to 19 August 2009 at the Shanghai Exhibition Centre, organised by the Shanghai Municipal Bureau of Press and Publication. The theme of this edition was "I love reading, I love life". This edition was primarily composed of over 40 Shanghai publishing units, together with over 470 publishers including the China Publishing Group and central and ministerial publishers in Beijing. Over 100,000 titles from across the country were presented, including over 60,000 new titles. More than 370 cultural activities were organised, including over 60 new book launches and book signing events. The main venue at the Shanghai Exhibition Centre received 240,000 visitors from Shanghai, across China, and overseas; sub-venues including Shanghai Book City, Boku Bookstore, the Ancient Books Bookstore, the Art Bookshop, Dazhong Bookstore, and Jifeng Books received over 300,000 visitors. Main venue sales reached 28 million yuan, and sub-venue sales reached 10 million yuan. The guest of honour province for this edition was Jiangsu Province, with 33 participating units from Jiangsu presenting over 4,000 Jiangsu publications and nearly 30 cultural activities. During the book fair, the 2009 Shanghai Book Fair Book Trade Fair was also held for three days, with total transactions reaching 188.41 million yuan.

=== 2010 Shanghai Book Fair ===
The 2010 Shanghai Book Fair was held from 11 to 17 August 2010 at the Shanghai Exhibition Centre, organised by the Shanghai Municipal Bureau of Press and Publication. The theme of this edition was "I love reading, I love life – travelling alongside the World Expo". Over 470 publishers from Shanghai and across the country participated, presenting over 150,000 titles, and a total of 252,000 visitors were received. The main venue of the book fair achieved sales of 30.8 million yuan, while 16 sub-venues achieved sales of 11 million yuan. The Book Fair Organising Committee for the first time launched three "Top Ten" selection activities: "Ten Most Influential Publishers", "Ten Most Influential New Books", and "Ten Most Creative Editors". Over 420 cultural activities were organised during the book fair. The guest of honour province for this edition was Zhejiang Province, which planned and organised nearly 20 cultural activities.

=== 2011 Shanghai Book Fair ===
The 2011 Shanghai Book Fair and "Bookish China" (Note: The Chinese name of the event is 书香中国. 书香 (Shūxiāng) refers to a tradition of reading and the term is used to promote reading initiatives, such as conferences, competitions, city reading seasons, etc.) Shanghai Week was held from 17 to 23 August 2011 at the Shanghai Exhibition Centre, organised by the General Administration of Press and Publication of the People's Republic of China and the Shanghai Municipal People's Government, and hosted by the Publicity Department of the Shanghai Municipal Committee of the CPC and the Shanghai Municipal Bureau of Press and Publication. The theme of this edition was "I love reading, I love life – inheriting the classics, writing a glorious chapter". Over 150,000 titles were presented, over 440 cultural activities were held, and over 500 publishing units from across the country participated. The main venue of the book fair achieved sales of 40.4 million yuan, and sub-venues achieved sales of 14.3 million yuan. The guest of honour province for this edition was Chongqing Municipality, which also planned and organised over 10 cultural activities. This edition held 140 cultural lectures and over 110 new book launches and signing events. A total of 282,000 visitors attended. This edition also launched the official Weibo account @书香上海 (Bookish Shanghai) for the first time.

=== 2012 Shanghai Book Fair ===
The 2012 Shanghai Book Fair and "Bookish China" Shanghai Week was held from 15 to 21 August 2012 at the Shanghai Exhibition Centre, organised by the General Administration of Press and Publication and the Shanghai Municipal People's Government, hosted by the Publicity Department of the Shanghai Municipal Committee of the CPC and the Shanghai Municipal Bureau of Press and Publication, and co-hosted by the Jing'an District People's Government. A total of over 150,000 titles were exhibited at this edition, and over 460 cultural activities were held, with 500 publishing units and 320,000 readers participating. On 17 August, the first Shanghai Book Fair Shanghai International Literature Week international forum was held on the theme "Literary Writing in the Age of Images". On 18 August, an academic publishing Shanghai forum was held, jointly organised by the Shanghai Municipal Bureau of Press and Publication, Fudan University, and Wenhui Bao, and hosted by the Shanghai Publishing Association and Fudan University Press. The guest of honour province for this edition was Hebei Province. This edition also for the first time provided full free Wi-Fi coverage within the venue under the name "shbookfair".

=== 2013 Shanghai Book Fair ===
The 2013 Shanghai Book Fair and "Bookish China" Shanghai Week was held from 14 to 20 August 2013 at the Shanghai Exhibition Centre, organised by the State Administration of Press, Publication, Radio, Film and Television and the Shanghai Municipal People's Government; hosted by the Publicity Department of the Shanghai Municipal Committee of the CPC and the Shanghai Municipal Bureau of Press and Publication; and co-hosted by the Jing'an District Government. The theme was "I love reading, I love life". The exhibition area was approximately 22,000 square metres, with over 150,000 titles presented and over 600 cultural activities held, and over 500 publishing units from across the country participating. Over 900 well-known figures from China and overseas attended the book fair in person. The guest of honour province for this edition was Hunan Province. For the first time, this edition of the Shanghai Book Fair followed international conventions by not disclosing visitor numbers or sales figures, instead placing greater emphasis on "cultural atmosphere" beyond mere "popularity". This edition also for the first time introduced seven evenings of night sessions, and launched the official "Shanghai Book Fair" website and WeChat platform.

=== 2014 Shanghai Book Fair ===
The 2014 Shanghai Book Fair and "Bookish China" Shanghai Week was held from 13 to 19 August 2014 at the Shanghai Exhibition Centre, organised by the State Administration of Press, Publication, Radio, Film and Television and the Shanghai Municipal People's Government, hosted by the Publicity Department of the Shanghai Municipal Committee of the CPC and the Shanghai Municipal Bureau of Press and Publication, and co-hosted by the Jing'an District People's Government. This edition featured over 150,000 titles, nearly 700 reading and cultural activities of various types, and over 500 publishing units from across the country participating. The guest of honour province for this edition was Beijing Municipality. This edition also for the first time genuinely covered all 17 districts and counties of Shanghai. During the book fair, literary figures attending included V. S. Naipaul, winner of the 2001 Nobel Prize in Literature, as well as American poet Robert Hass, Hungarian writer Péter Esterházy, French biographer Pierre Assouline, French novelist Marc Levy, and American author Robert Olen Butler. This edition of the Shanghai Book Fair again followed international conventions by not disclosing visitor numbers or sales figures. For the first time, the staff canteen at the Shanghai Exhibition Centre, the venue of this edition, was opened to readers, reducing the cost of meals for visitors to the book fair.

=== 2015 Shanghai Book Fair ===
The 2015 Shanghai Book Fair and "Bookish China" Shanghai Week was held at the Shanghai Exhibition Centre from 19 to 25 August 2015, organised by the State Administration of Press, Publication, Radio, Film and Television and the Shanghai Municipal People's Government, hosted by the Publicity Department of the Shanghai Municipal Committee of the CPC and the Shanghai Municipal Bureau of Press and Publication, and co-hosted by the Jing'an District People's Government of Shanghai. The guest of honour province for this edition was Jiangxi Province.

=== 2016 Shanghai Book Fair ===
The 2016 Shanghai Book Fair and "Bookish China" Shanghai Week was held from 17 to 23 August at the Shanghai Exhibition Centre, with an exhibition area of 23,000 square metres, organised by the State Administration of Press, Publication, Radio, Film and Television and the Shanghai Municipal People's Government, hosted by the Publicity Department of the Shanghai Municipal Committee of the CPC and the Shanghai Municipal Bureau of Press and Publication, and co-hosted by the Jing'an District People's Government. The book fair's theme remained "I love reading, I love life", and the guest of honour province was Hubei Province. Xuhui District cooperated with the Shanghai Book Fair to hold the inaugural "Shanghai International Poetry Festival", expanded from the earlier "Poetry Night". This edition also invited Svetlana Alexievich, the Belarusian writer and journalist who won the 2015 Nobel Prize in Literature, as a guest, becoming one of the highlights of this edition.

=== 2017 Shanghai Book Fair ===
The 2017 Shanghai Book Fair was held from 16 to 22 August at the Shanghai Exhibition Centre, with the theme "I love reading, I love life", and the guest of honour province was Liaoning Province. As the fair coincided with the 90th anniversary of the founding of the People's Liberation Army and the 80th anniversary of the full-scale outbreak of the Second Sino-Japanese War, a military-themed publishing hall was specially set up, and a large oil painting depicting the scene of the Tokyo Trial was exhibited.

=== 2018 Shanghai Book Fair ===
The 2018 Shanghai Book Fair and "Bookish China" Shanghai Week was held from 15 to 21 August at the Shanghai Exhibition Centre, organised by the Shanghai Municipal People's Government, hosted by the Publicity Department of the Shanghai Municipal Committee of the CPC and the Shanghai Municipal Bureau of Press and Publication, and co-hosted by the Jing'an District People's Government and the Shanghai Exhibition Centre. The opening coincided with Tropical Storm Rumbia making landfall in Shanghai. This edition was the first to provide online ticketing through the "Shanghai Culture Cloud Platform". As the fair coincided with the 40th anniversary of the reform and opening-up policy and the 15th anniversary of the Shanghai Book Fair, the left and right corridors of the foyer were specially set up with an exhibition of quality books marking the 40th anniversary of reform and opening up and a retrospective exhibition of the 15th anniversary of the Shanghai Book Fair respectively. The guest of honour province for this edition was Guizhou Province. The China Foreign Languages Press, China's largest foreign-language publishing organisation, participated in the Shanghai Book Fair on a large scale as a group for the first time, with a booth located in the sun terrace on the west side of the main hall of the Shanghai Exhibition Centre, covering 300 square metres.

=== 2019 Shanghai Book Fair ===
The 2019 Shanghai Book Fair and "Bookish China" Shanghai Week was held from 14 to 20 August at the Shanghai Exhibition Centre, with the guest of honour province being Sichuan Province. This edition for the first time launched a "mobile book fair" mobile app, through which visitors could scan codes on site to order books for home delivery.

=== 2020 Shanghai Book Fair ===
The 2020 Shanghai Book Fair and "Bookish China" Shanghai Week was held from 12 to 18 August at the Shanghai Exhibition Centre. The guest of honour province for this edition was Zhejiang Province.

Due to the COVID-19 pandemic, this edition adopted a real-name reservation system, with both offline and online reservation modes, and tickets were no longer sold at the venue. In addition, the period from 17:00 to 18:00 each day during the event was designated as a general site clearance and pandemic disinfection period, during which all readers, visitors, and booth staff were required to leave the premises.

=== 2021 Shanghai Book Fair ===
The 2021 Shanghai Book Fair and "Bookish China" Shanghai Week was scheduled for 11 to 17 August 2021, but was subsequently postponed due to the impact of the 2021 Nanjing Lukou International Airport COVID-19 cluster.

=== 2022 Shanghai Book Fair ===
The 2022 Shanghai Book Fair was held from 18 to 22 November at the Shanghai Exhibition Centre. This edition implemented a reservation-entry system; visitors were required to register their travel history, complete the required number of PCR tests, and wear N95 masks throughout.

=== 2023 Shanghai Book Fair ===
The 2023 Shanghai Book Fair was held from 16 to 22 August at the Shanghai Exhibition Centre. On the morning of 17 August, Shanghai Mayor Gong Zheng visited the Shanghai Book Fair.

At the fair, there were no on-site ticket sales; all visitors were required to purchase tickets on Damai.cn, which left some elderly people dissatisfied.

=== 2024 Shanghai Book Fair ===
The 2024 Shanghai Book Fair was held from 14 to 20 August at the Shanghai Exhibition Centre.

=== 2025 Shanghai Book Fair ===
The 21st Shanghai Book Fair was held from 13 to 19 August 2025. For the first time, a dual main venue format was adopted: in addition to the Shanghai Exhibition Centre, a second main venue was added at Shanghai Book City (465 Fuzhou Road). The fair also opened an antiquarian books area, with participating exhibitors including Zhongguo Bookstore, Shanghai Old Bookstore, and Sichuan Maomao Bookstore.

== Gallery ==
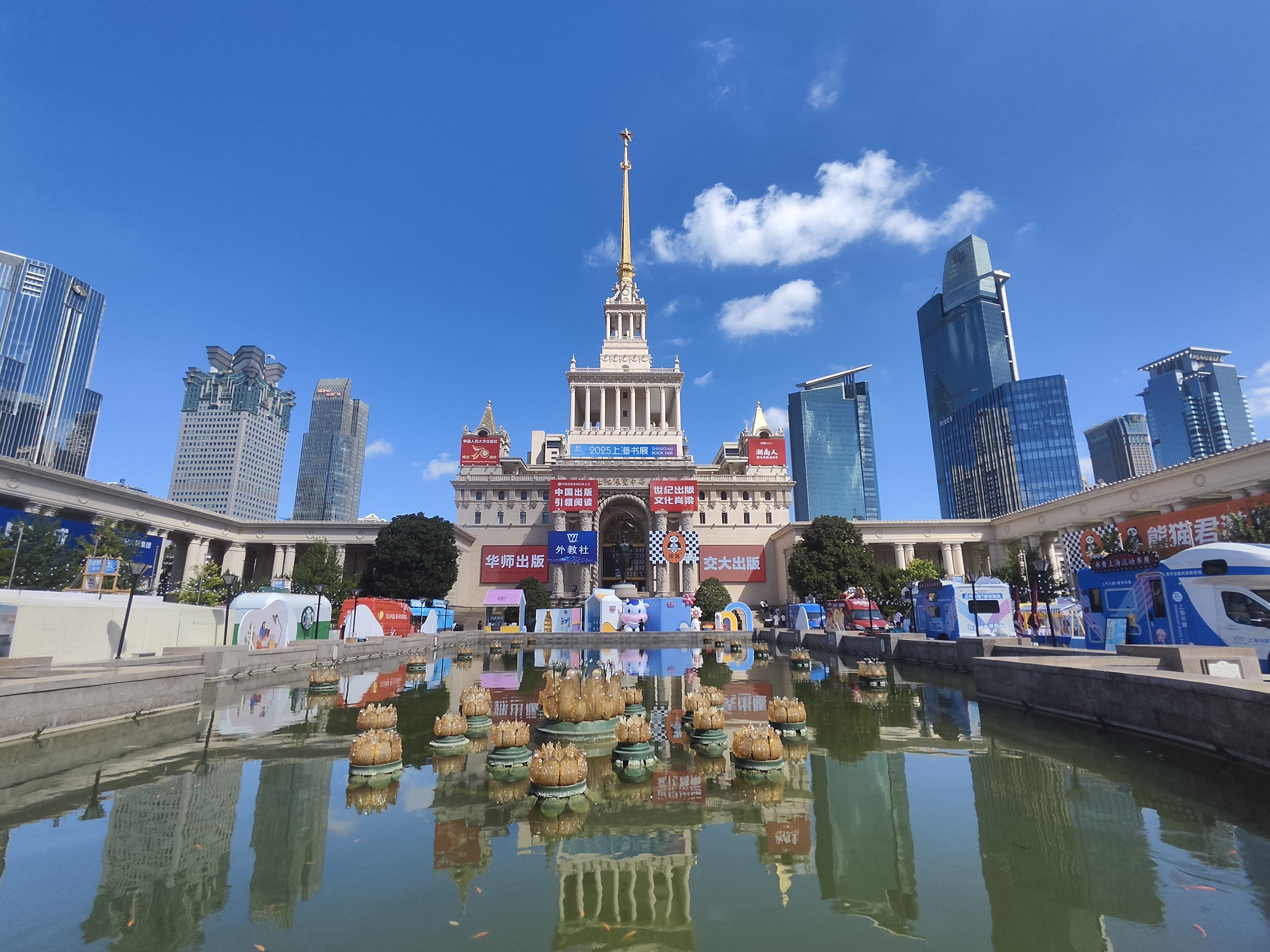
2025 Shanghai Book Fair

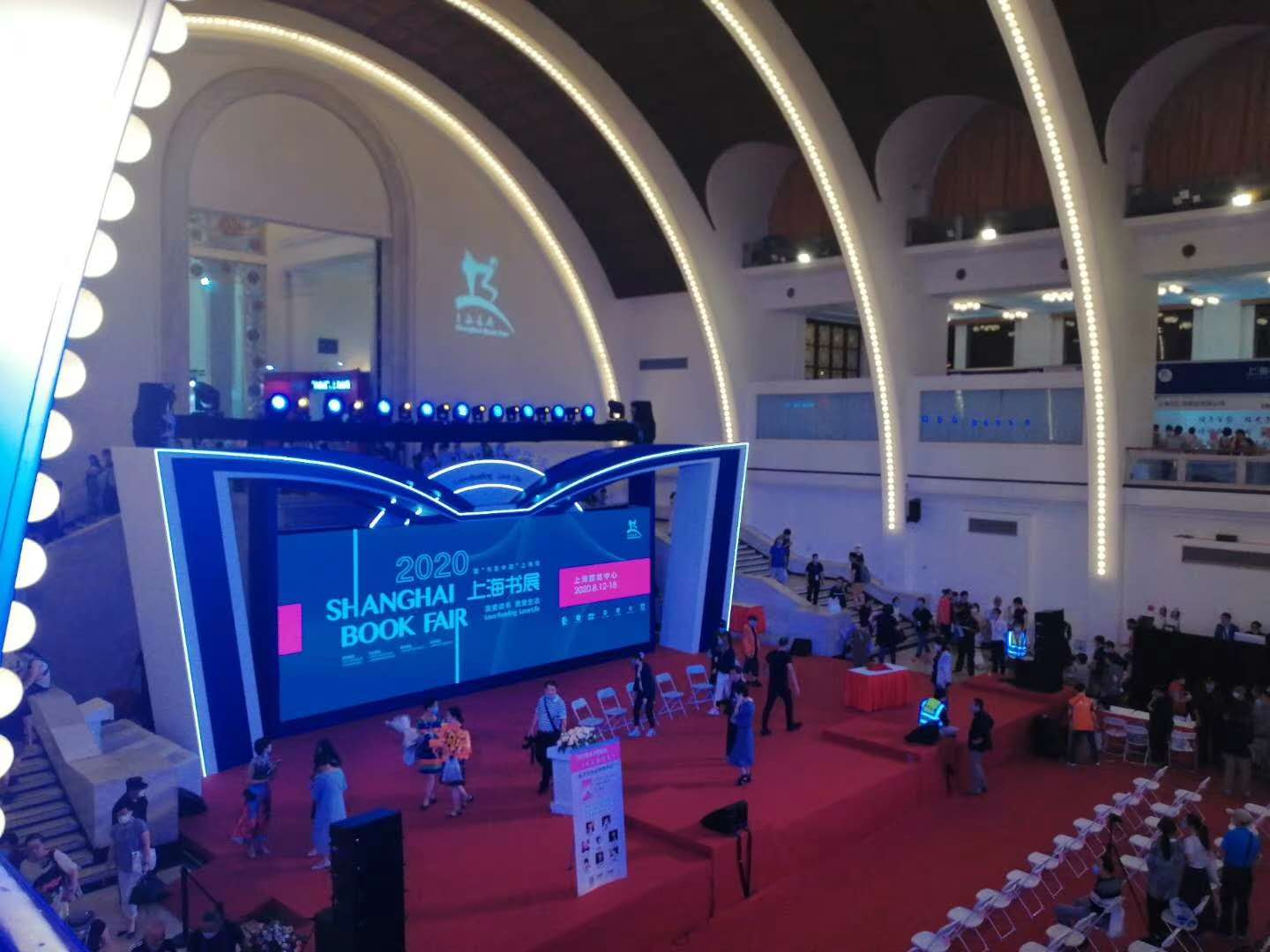
2020 Shanghai Book Fair

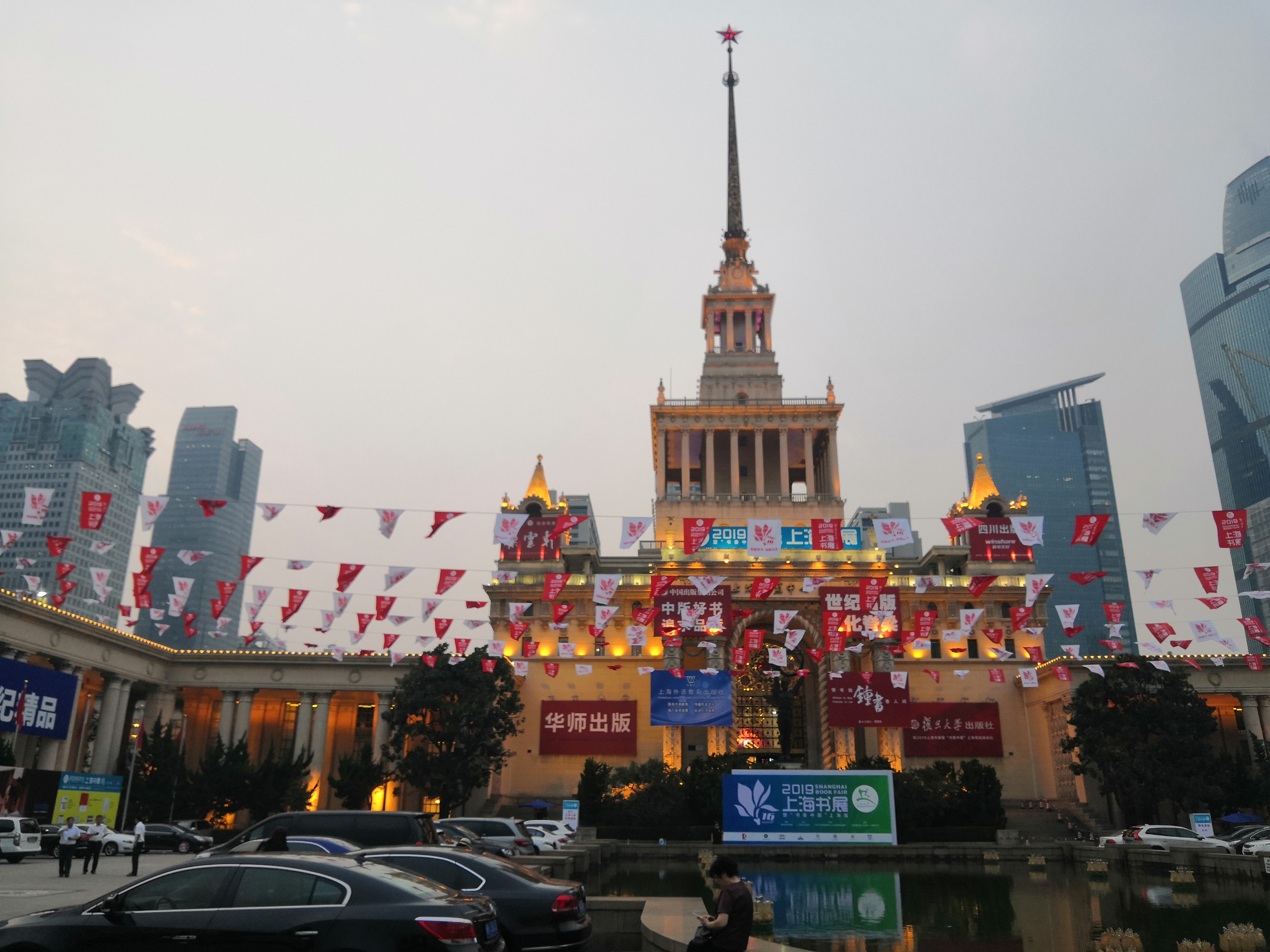
2019 Shanghai Book Fair

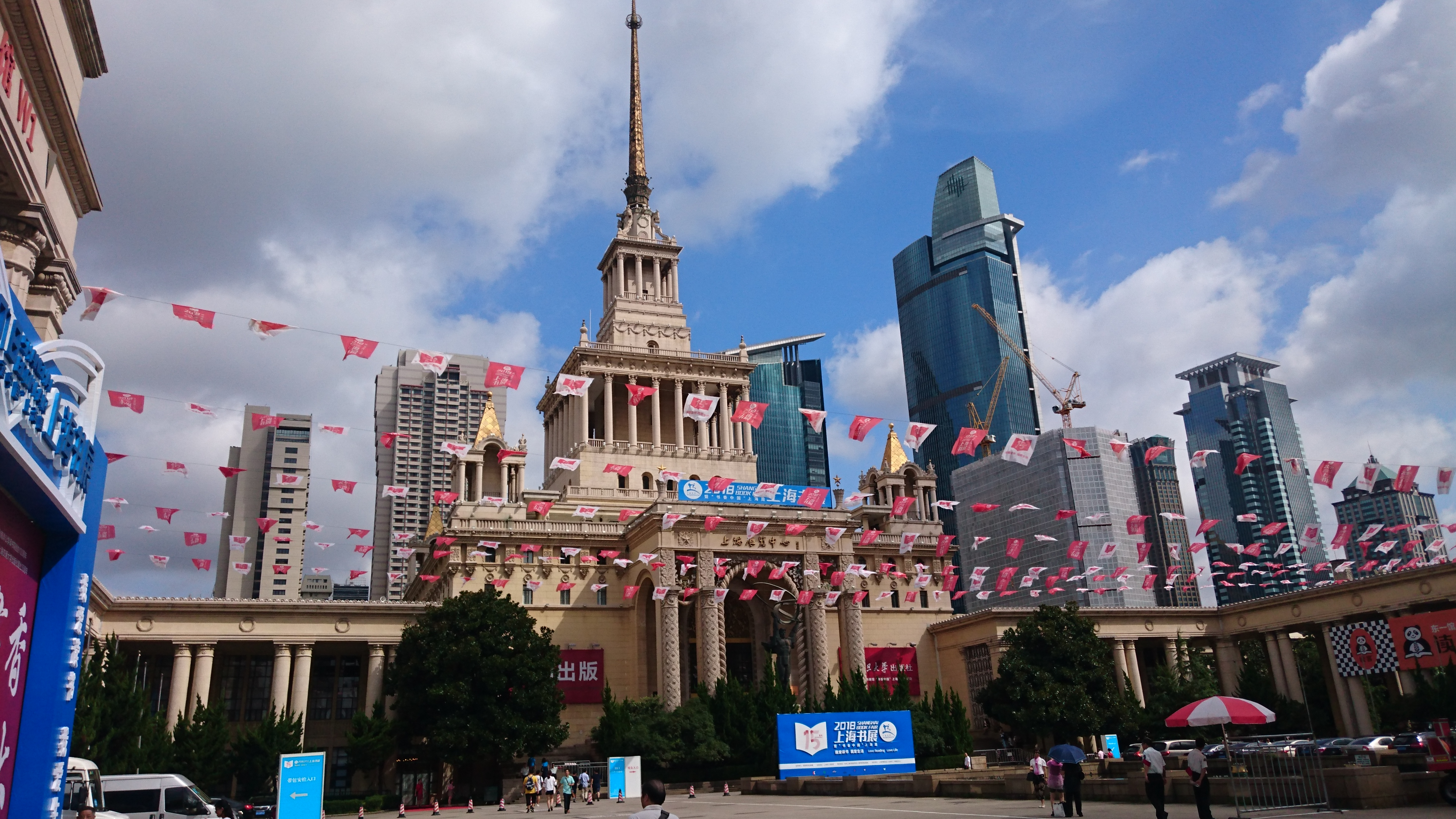
2018 Shanghai Book Fair

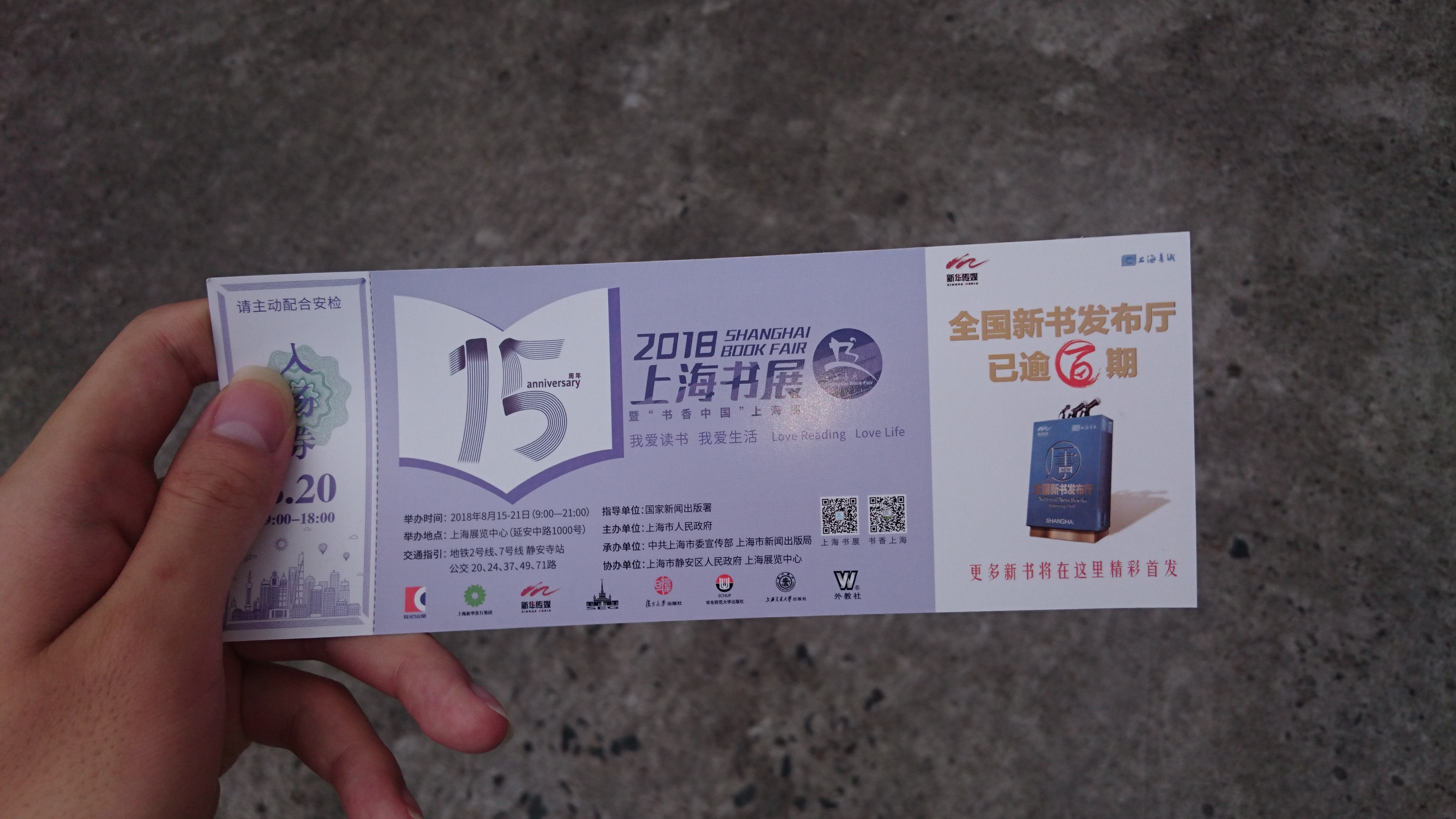
Front of the 2018 Shanghai Book Fair ticket

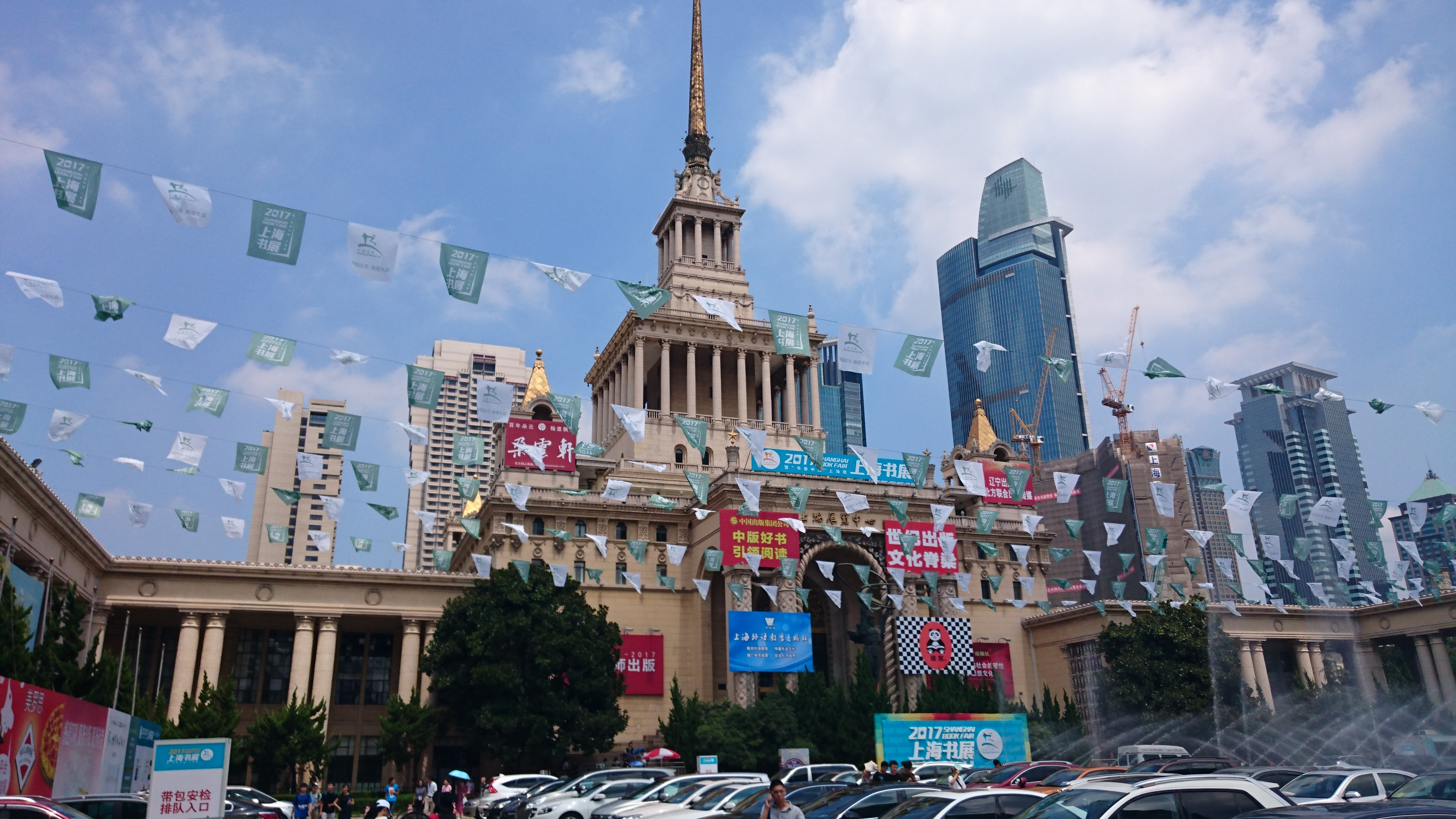
2017 Shanghai Book Fair

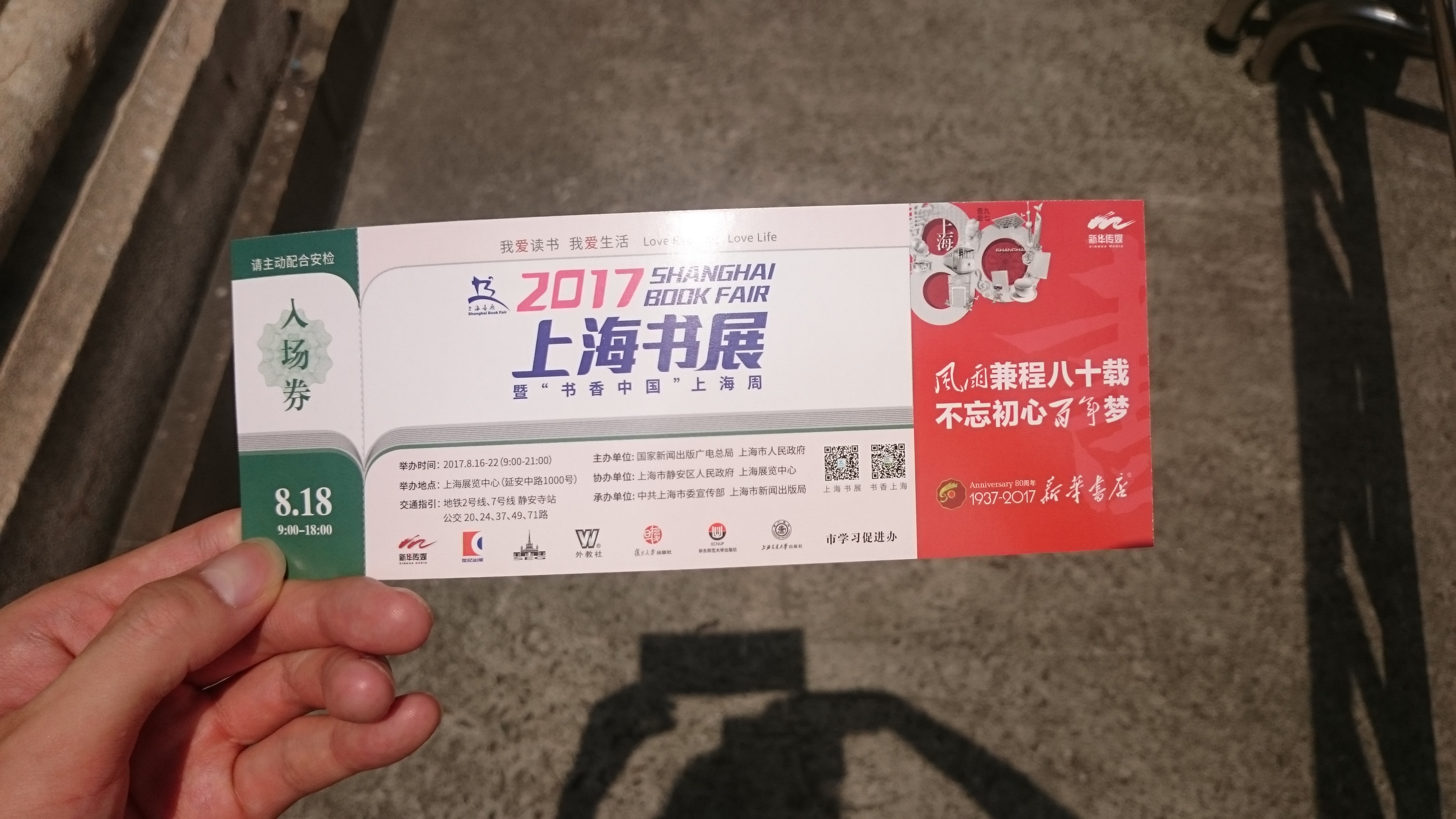
Front of the 2017 Shanghai Book Fair ticket

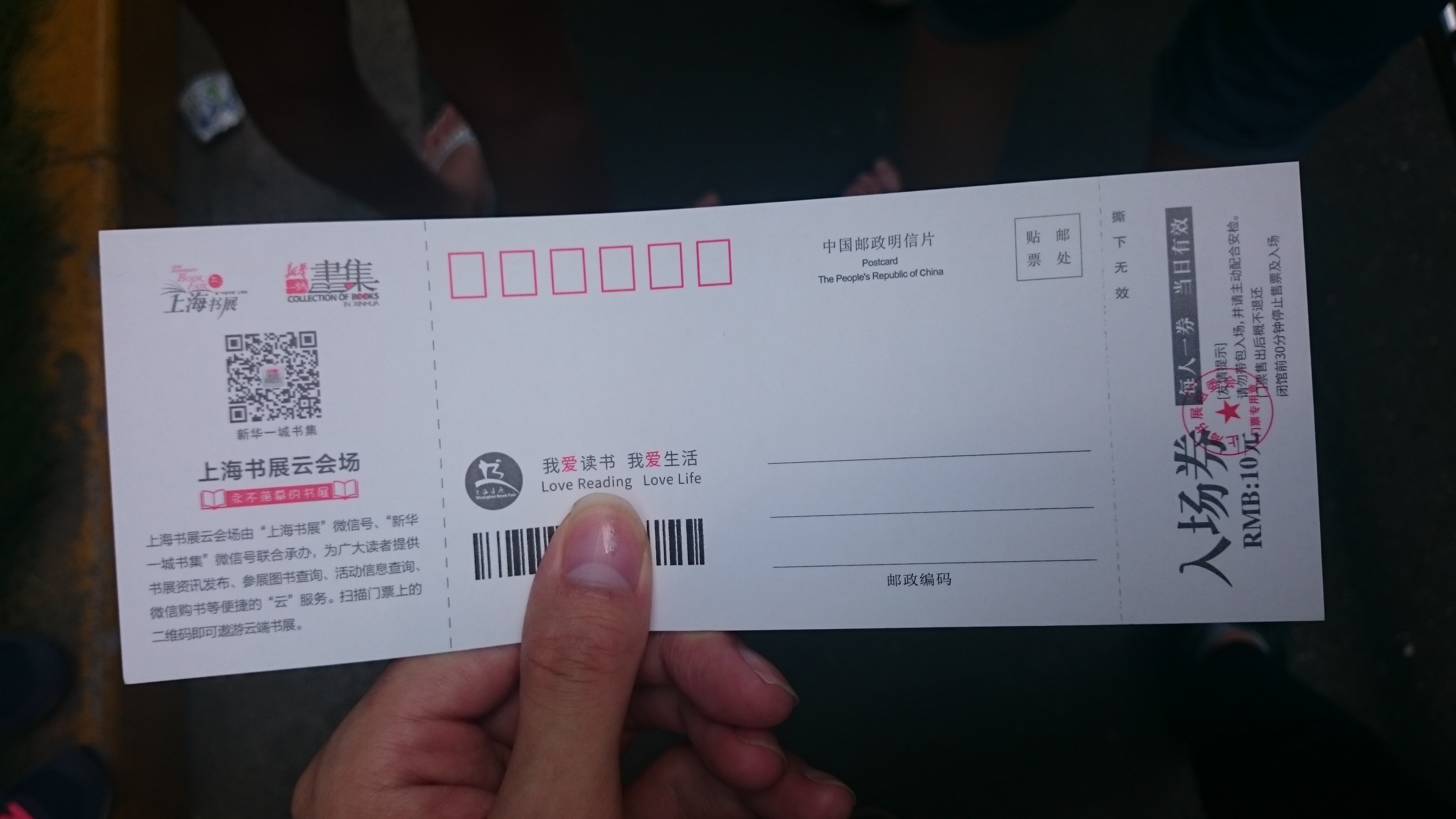
Back of the 2016 Shanghai Book Fair ticket

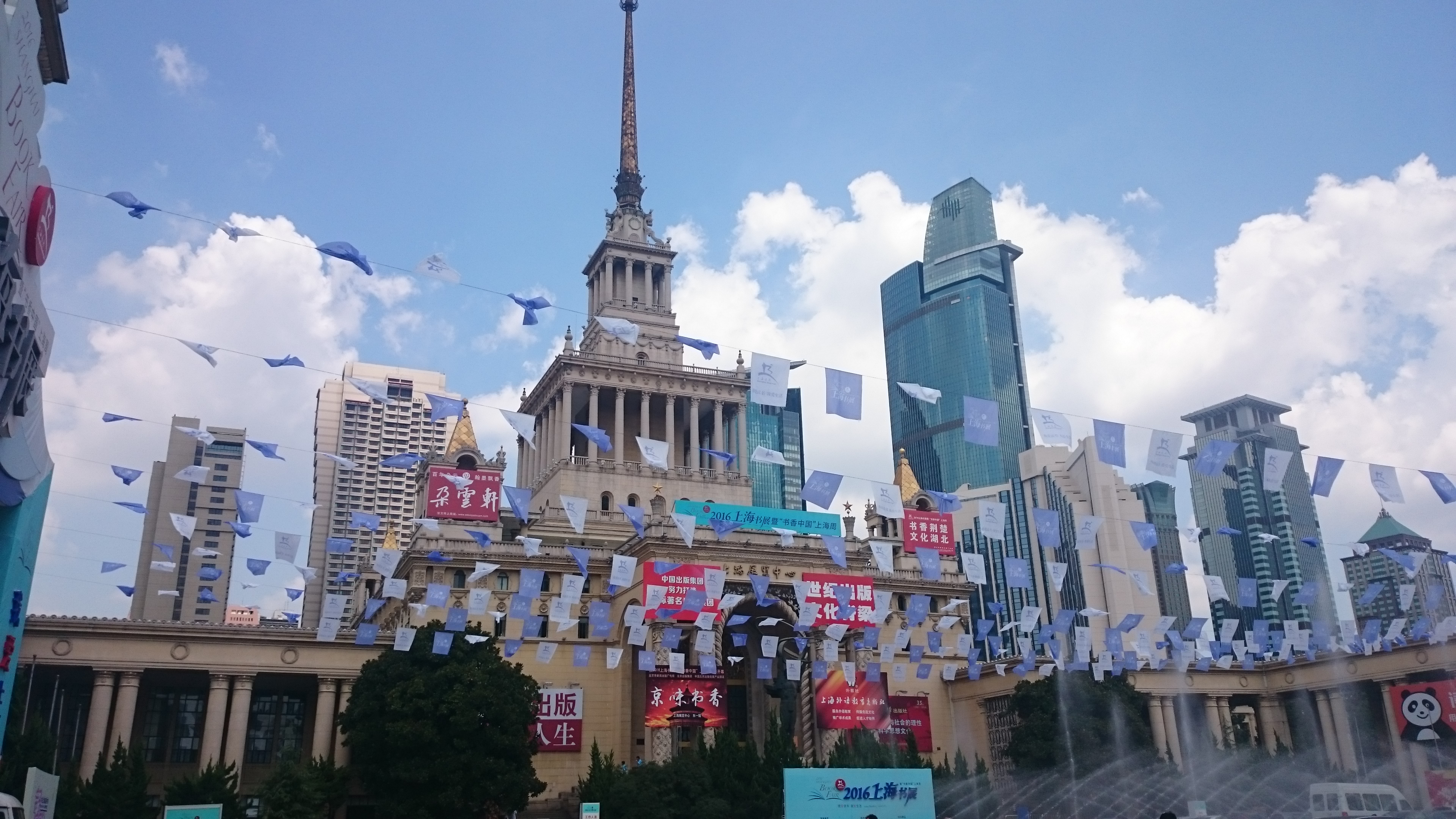
2016 Shanghai Book Fair

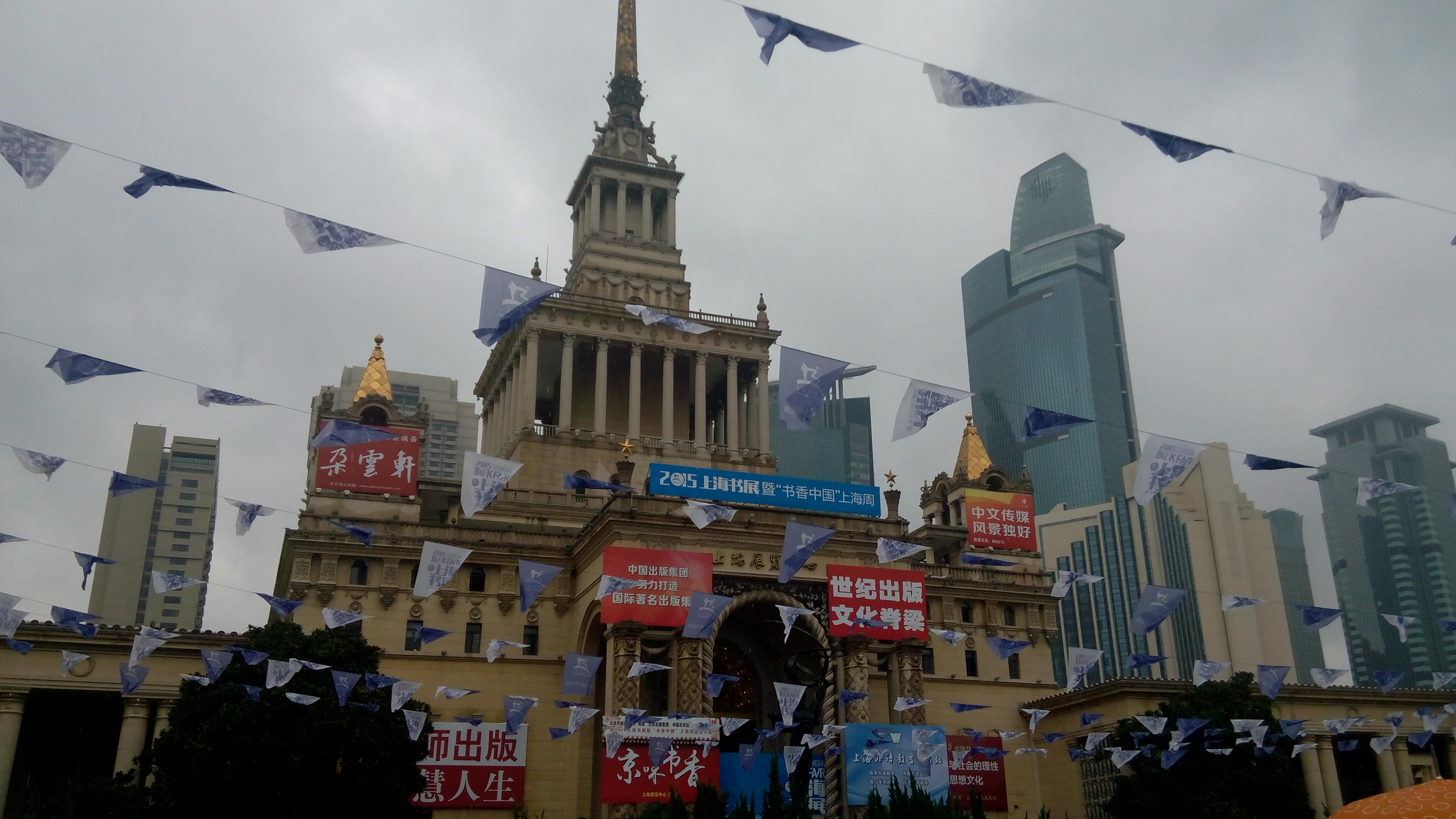
2015 Shanghai Book Fair

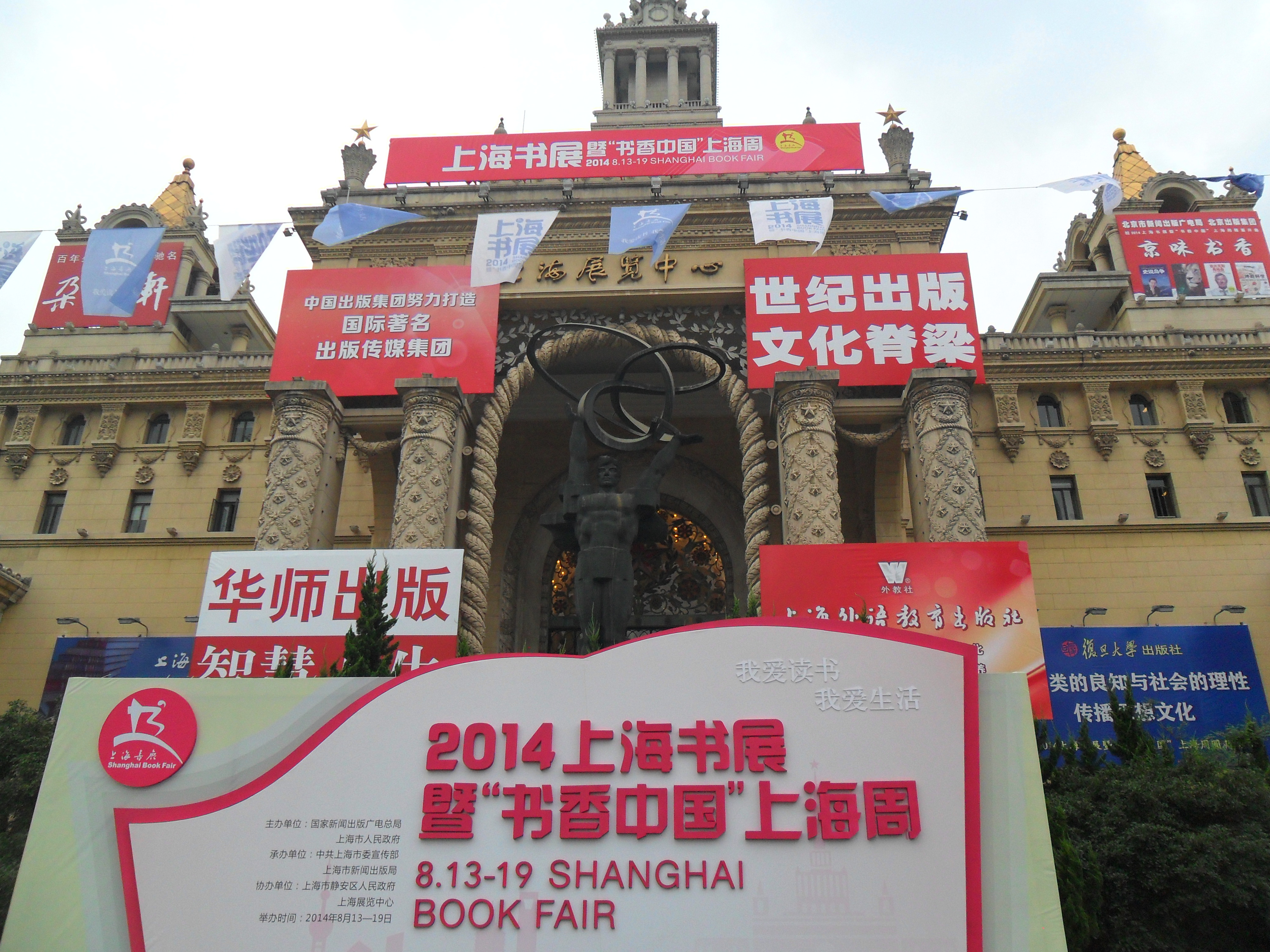
2014 Shanghai Book Fair

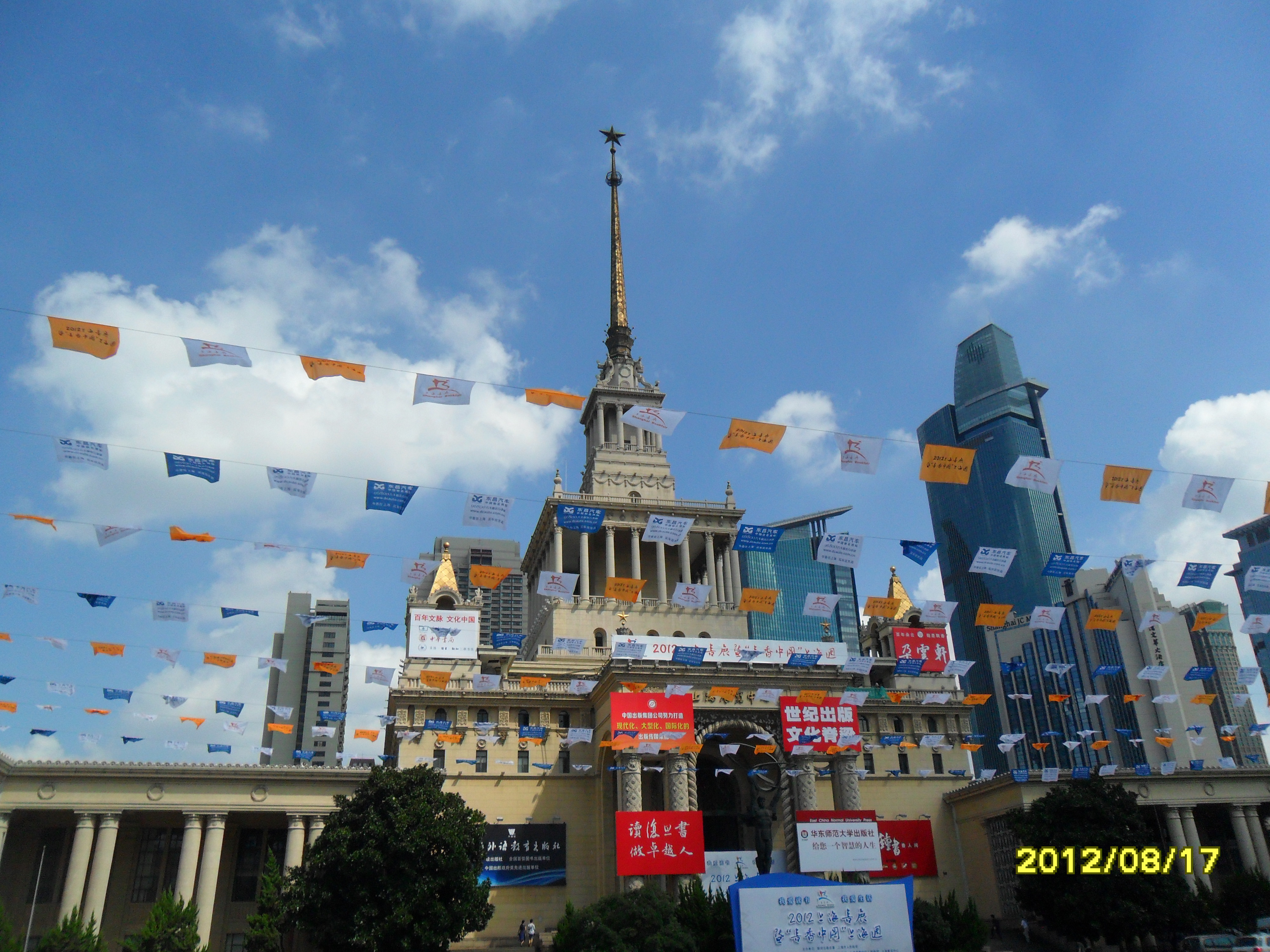
2012 Shanghai Book Fair

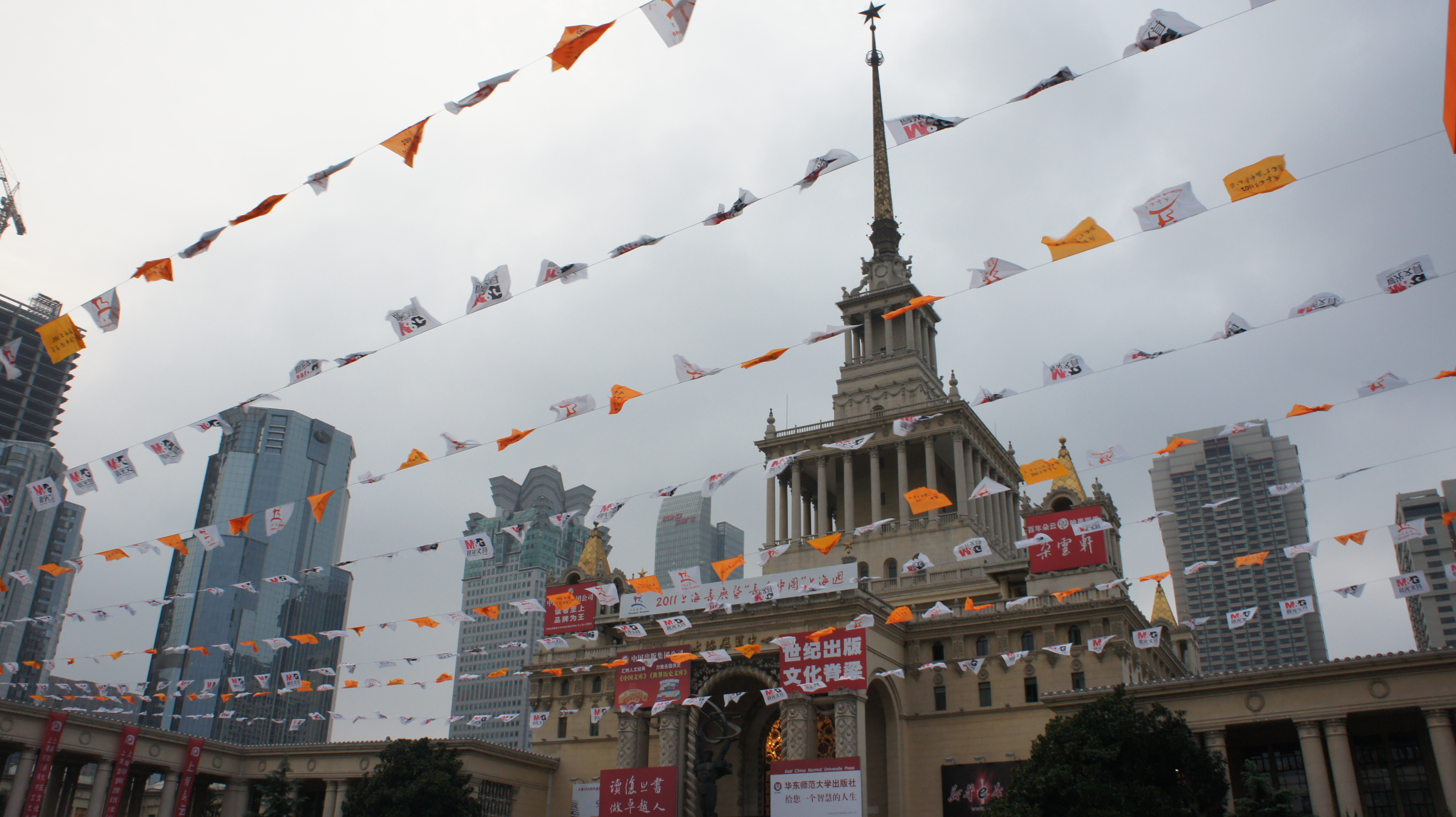
2011 Shanghai Book Fair

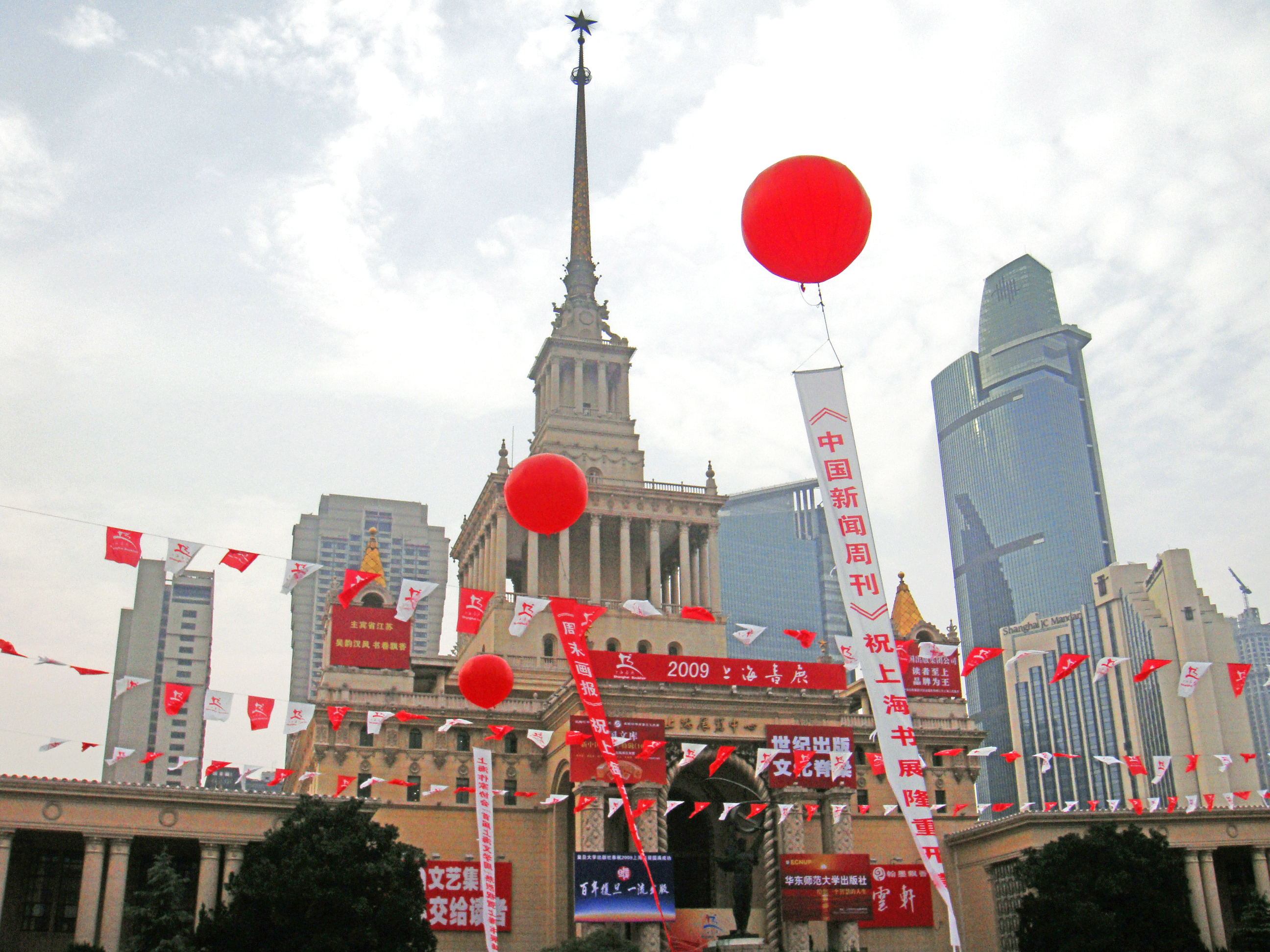
2009 Shanghai Book Fair
Media related to Shanghai Book Fair at Wikimedia Commons
