= Kim Hee-kyung =

South Korean journalist and humanitarian

- 김희경

Vice Minister of Gender Equality and Family
- In office 8 February 2019 – 8 September 2020
- President: Moon Jae-in
- Prime Minister: Lee Nak-yeon; Chung Sye-kyun
- Minister: Jin Sun-mee; Lee Jung-ok
- Preceded by: Lee Sook-jin
- Succeeded by: Kim Kyung-seon

Personal details
- Born: 1967 (age 58–59)
- Education: Seoul National University; Loyola Marymount University

Kim Hee-kyung (Korean: 김희경; Hanja: 金熹暻; born 1967) is a former South Korean journalist and humanitarian served as President Moon Jae-in's second Vice Minister of Gender Equality and Family from 2019 to 2020.

For almost two decades from 1991 to 2009, Kim worked as a journalist for The Dong-A Ilbo. Lee then worked in NGOs and civil societies - as a director of advocacy and a head of advocacy and programme at Save the Children Korea from 2010 to 2016, a director at the Ministry-funded Migrant Youth Foundation from 2015 to 2017 and a director at Korean Human Rights Policy Institute in 2017.

Lee first entered public service in 2018 when she was first appointed as President Moon's second Deputy Minister of Culture, Sports and Tourism - its third highest position. In 2019 she was reshuffled to deputy head of the Ministry of Gender Equality and Family.

Furthermore, Kim translated Sal Khan's book in Korean and wrote several books. She is best known to the public through her book Weird Normal Family (Korean: 이상한 정상가족) criticising the current norm of nuclear family for its direct and indirect violence on children.

Kim holds two degrees: a bachelor in Anthropology from Seoul National University and an MBA from Loyola Marymount University.
