= Real-name system for online games in China =

Chinese online gaming policy

The real-name system for online games refers to a system in which gamers in the People's Republic of China are required to enter their real names and ID numbers before they can play online games. The system was first proposed and launched by the Ministry of Culture on June 22, 2010, based on the document "Interim Measures for the Administration of Online Games". However, this document was replaced on July 10, 2019, by the "Notice on Preventing Minors from Being Addicted to Online Games" newly issued by the State Administration of Press and Publication in accordance with General Secretary Xi Jinping's instructions on youth work.

== System ==
The real-name system for online games consists of three systems: the first is the registration system, where players need to provide their identity information; the second is the public inquiry system, where parents can check which games their children are playing and their online status; and the third is the authentication system, which works with the public security department to authenticate the registration information. Once a user is found to have registered with a false identity, the player's level, experience points, props, etc. will be reset. However, under such strict conditions, many minors still find other ways to circumvent these three systems: such as purchasing ID numbers online and opening multiple game accounts at once.

Since the real-name system for online games has certain drawbacks and cannot be cured, the intervention of relevant national agencies is needed. In 2020, the Cyberspace Administration of China decided to launch a two-month "clear and bright" special rectification of the summer Internet environment for minors from early July to the end of August. There are four main contents:

- Concentrate on rectifying problems such as the failure to implement the real-name system and anti-addiction measures on online gaming platforms, and inducing minors to recharge and consume.
- Severely crack down on the use of vulgar, pornographic, bloody and violent information and other bad information to promote and induce minors to click and install games.
- The focus is on rectifying problems such as the inadequate implementation of the real-name registration system for online game accounts and measures to prevent minors from becoming addicted to games.
- Strictly regulate online games that induce minors to pay for things such as top-up rewards and equipment purchases.

In August 2021, the General Administration of Press and Publication issued the "Notice on Further Strict Management to Effectively Prevent Minors from Being Addicted to Online Games" in accordance with General Secretary Xi Jinping's "important" instructions on youth work.

== See also ==
- Anti-Addiction System for Online Games
- Notice of the National Press and Publication Administration on Further Strict Management and Effective Prevention of Minors' Addiction to Online Games
