= Finance and Investment Post =

Chinese newspaper

- Native name: 金融投资报
- Type: Daily newspaper
- Publisher: Finance and Investment Agency
- Founded: August 8, 1992
- Language: Chinese
- Headquarters: Chengdu, Sichuan
- OCLC number: 123258330
- Website: jrtzb.com.cn

Finance and Investment Post or Jinrong touzibao (Chinese: 金融投资报), commonly known as Finance and Investment, is a Chengdu-based national financial and securities daily newspaper in China. Inaugurated on August 8, 1992, the newspaper focuses on the financial and securities market and economic life as the main coverage. It's sponsored and supervised by the [ichuan Daily Press Group (四川日报报业集团).

== History ==
Finance and Investment Post has been approved by the National Press and Publication Administration of China and was founded on August 8, 1992, in Chengdu, Sichuan.

When the Finance and Investment Post was launched, it was published by Sichuan Daily Agency (四川日报社), and the name of the newspaper at that time was Securities and Investment Post (证券与投资报), which was renamed as Sichuan Securities and Investment Post (四川证券投资报) on March 1, 1994.

In November 1995, Sichuan Securities and Investment Post merged with Southwest Materials and Commerce Post (西南物资商业报) and was renamed Sichuan Finance and Investment Post (四川金融投资报).

On March 9, 2002, Sichuan Finance and Investment Post was officially renamed as Finance and Investment Post.
