= Lee Sook-jin =

South Korean feminist (born 1964)

- 이숙진

President of Sports Ethics Center
- In office 5 August 2020 – 19 March 2021
- Minister: Park Yang-woo; Hwang Hee
- Preceded by: Position established
- Succeeded by: Lee Eun-jeong

Vice Minister of Gender Equality and Family
- In office 13 June 2017 – 7 February 2019
- President: Moon Jae-in
- Prime Minister: Lee Nak-yeon
- Minister: Chung Hyun-back; Jin Sun-mee
- Succeeded by: Kim Hee-kyung

Personal details
- Born: 23 January 1964 (age 62) Gwangju, South Korea
- Education: Ewha Womans University

Lee Sook-jin (Korean: 이숙진; born 23 January 1964) is a South Korean women's right activist who previously served as the inaugural president of newly created Sports Ethics Center of the Ministry of Culture, Sports and Tourism from 2020 to 2021 and President Moon Jae-in's first Vice Minister of Gender Equality and Family from 2017 to 2019.

Before appointed as Vice Minister, Lee was a director of Korea Foundation for Women from 2016. From 2013 to 2015 she led Seoul's own Foundation of Women and Family. From 2010 to 2012 she worked as a researcher and research professor at Catholic University of Daegu. She was previously a researcher at the Incheon Institute, an Incheon's think tank. In 2010 she founded gender studies research centre.

In August 2020 Lee was appointed by the Minister of Culture, Sports and Tourism Park Yang-woo as the first head of newly created Sports Ethics Center. In response to growing number of reported cases of human rights violations in sports community, the National Sports Promotion Act was amended in February 2020 to establish this center as the central organisation under the Ministry to deal with any human rights violations of athletes from bullying to sexual harassment and conduct relevant investigations. The Act also established this centre independent of any sports associations so it can protect the victims and request the Sports Minister to order sports associations to take disciplinary actions on those responsible upon investigations. In March 2021 Lee resigned from the post highlighting systematic inability to fulfill the Centre's mandate as most of its personnel deployed are administrators not investigators.

Moreover, Lee spent her entire career in public service under President Roh Moo-hyun from 2003 to 2008 before recruited by President Moon Jae-in as the deputy head of Ministry of Gender Equality and Family in 2017. From 2003 to 2005 she worked as an administrator at the Office of the President and in 2007 she was promoted to its one of secretaries. From 2006 to 2009 she also worked as associate professor at Ministry of Health and Welfare-funded Korea Human Resource Institute for Health and Welfare.

Lee holds three degrees from Ewha Womans University - a bachelor in communications and a master's and a doctorate in women's studies.
