= 2020–2021 Xi Jinping administration reform spree =

Spate of cultural and economic reforms in China

In 2020, the Chinese Communist Party (CCP) and various Chinese regulatory bodies, under CCP General Secretary Xi Jinping, began a regulatory spree, strengthening regulations, issuing fines, and introducing or modifying laws. Though mostly targeted at disrupting the growth of monopolistic technology corporations, the government also introduced other reforms with implications for large swathes of the economy and life in China. Actions taken included the implementation of restrictions on for-profit tutoring and education companies, the refinement of existing rules for limits on minors playing online video games, and the introduction of new antitrust rules.

== Background and origins ==
=== Historical background ===
The reform and opening up under Chinese leader Deng Xiaoping in the 1980s relaxed government control of some portions of the economy, allowing for the emergence of private industry. China maintains numerous state-owned enterprises and the economy, referred to as a socialist market economy, operates with a high degree of state control.

=== Recent events and context ===
Relations between China and the United States became strained during the Trump administration and tensions remain high during the Biden administration over disputes such as the sovereignty of Taiwan. An ongoing trade war between the two countries has negatively impacted both economies. This has led to speculation that the two countries will consciously "decouple" their economies.

China has a rapidly aging population. The nation also has a declining birth rate, attributed to the costs associated with raising children.

=== Reasoning, timing, and goals ===
==== As stated by Chinese officials ====
Chinese leadership has said the reforms aim to increase common prosperity in the hopes of shrinking the country's income and wealth disparities. Some of the efforts aim to lower the costs associated with child-rearing in the hopes of reversing a falling birth-rate.

==== Interpretations and speculation ====
The Wall Street Journal has stated that the goal of the reforms is to establish tighter control over the market economy, granting the state and the CCP renewed legitimacy. Other commentators have speculated that the reforms amount to an attempt by Xi to retrench his power before the 20th National Congress of the CCP and an effort aimed at China increasing its self-reliance, due to heightened tensions with trading partners.

== Beginning of reform activity ==
=== "Three red lines" and property sector regulation ===
During the 19th Party Congress, Xi Jinping stated with regard to China's property sector that "property is to be lived in, not speculated on." This principle became part of the basis for the three red lines. A working paper published by the National Bureau of Economic Research in 2020 estimated that China's property sector accounted for 29% of the country's economic activity. In August 2020, in an effort to better manage the sector, which historically has been heavily leveraged, Chinese regulators introduced drafts of rules dubbed the three red lines to formally limit the borrowing of real estate firms. The "three red lines" mandate that developers maintain:

- a debt-to-asset ratio of 70%,
- a 100% cap on net debt to equity,
- and enough cash on hand to satisfy short-term borrowing, debts, and liabilities.

Reuters reported that developers responded to the drafts by intensifying the use of tactics used to disguise debt. By the end of 2020, approximately half of the country's 66 largest developers were in compliance with the new regulations. In April 2021, only two firms—Evergrande and R&F Properties—remained non-compliant with all three red lines. In early December 2021, Evergrande declared that it was in default of its debts.

=== Suspension of Ant Group IPO ===
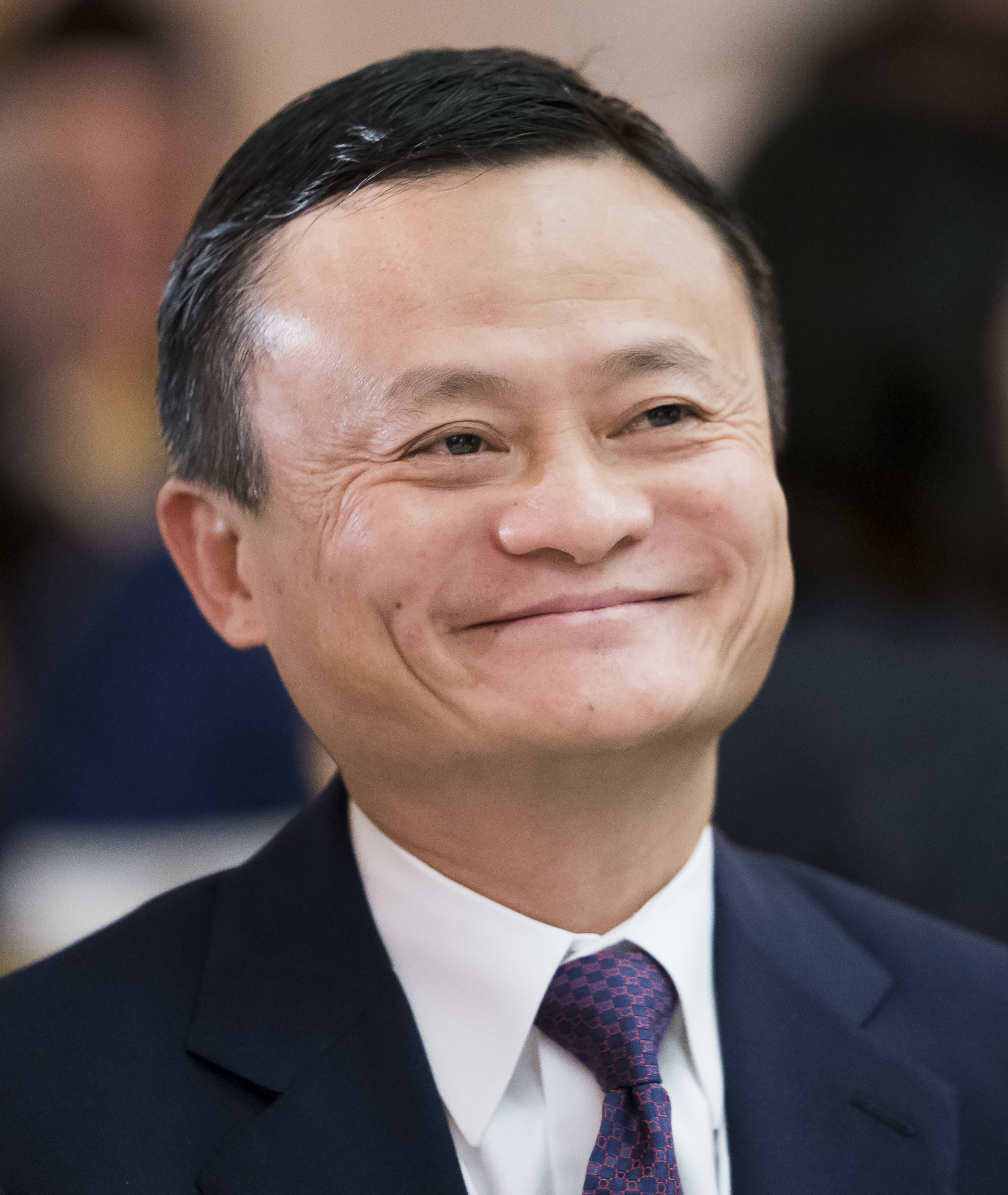
Jack Ma in 2018

Ant Group, a Chinese technology-enabled financial company majority-owned by its founder, Jack Ma, and affiliated with Ma's other major holding, Alibaba, began taking steps toward an initial public offering in 2020. Ant Group operates a number of lines of business, including Alipay, an online payments platform, Zhima Credit, a credit scoring program, and Yu'e Bao, a money market fund. Ant Group intended to raise $34 billion through the IPO process. This would have been the largest such offering by any company to date, above the $29.4 billion raised by Saudi Aramco as a result of its 2019 offering.

Due to Ant Group's scale—the company has approximately one billion users in China—and its operations, which include lending services, the company has attracted regulatory scrutiny in the past. The China Securities Regulatory Commission previously imposed new restrictions on money-market funds, a move attributed to the size and growth of Yu'e Bao, an Ant offering. Though the company asserts it does not function as a bank or a financial institution, Chinese banks have voiced their belief that Ant draws deposits away from them, in effect, undermining the banking system. The People's Bank of China requested data from banks that lent through Ant in mid-2020 and the State Administration for Market Regulation (SAMR) informally began an investigation earlier in the year into whether Alipay and WeChat Pay, a Tencent subsidiary, had abused their size to hamper competitors.

Several days before the IPO was to take place, the company's founder and controlling shareholder, Ma, made negative statements about Chinese regulators and the governing political party, the Chinese Communist Party. Ma criticized regulators for their focus on risk mitigation. Soon after the comments were made, Ma and other senior Ant executives were summoned to a meeting with the China Securities Regulatory Commission, the China Banking and Insurance Regulatory Commission, and the State Administration of Foreign Exchange as well as representatives from the country's central bank, the People's Bank of China. Ant Group issued a statement disclosing that the Ant and government representatives discussed "Views regarding the health and stability of the financial sector".

After the meeting, and two days before the IPO was set to occur, the offering was suspended by the Shanghai Stock Exchange. The Shanghai Stock Exchange referenced "major issues" as the reasoning behind the suspension. The exchange further indicated that the company no longer conformed with listing requirements. Ant subsequently suspended the Hong Kong listing. The Wall Street Journal attributed the suspension to the personal will of Xi, who had become infuriated by Ma's comments, citing "Chinese officials with knowledge of the matter", though these assertions have also been characterized as "rumors". The suspension was unexpected, surprising bankers working on the transaction, the broader financial industry, and consumers prepared to invest in the offering. It has been referred to as "abrupt" and "shocking". Ant began working to address regulator concerns in January 2021, though as of September 2021, no public plans for an IPO by the company had been announced.

The public increasingly criticized Jack Ma and Ant Group. This shift helped Chinese policy makers develop further mass support for common prosperity policies.

Jack Ma retreated from the public eye after the IPO's suspension. In January 2021, he spoke in a live-streamed video. In the video, he discussed his commitment to philanthropy and improving quality of life for those in rural China.

=== "Disorderly Capital" and anti-monopoly stance ===
Soon after the suspension of Ant's IPO, in November 2020, Chinese regulators introduced drafts of new anti-monopoly guidelines directed at large technology firms. China had, in January 2020, revised its Anti Monopoly Law to include language applicable to internet and technology companies. In December, Alibaba and a subsidiary of Tencent were both fined for not seeking approval of deals the companies had completed, which was framed as an anti-monopoly action. The anti-monopoly rules introduced in November were formalized as guidelines for companies in February 2021 by SAMR. These newly instituted rules include banning online retailers from presenting different prices to different consumers based on data collected about them.

A month after the release of the draft anti-monopoly rules, party officials began using the phrase the "disorderly expansion of capital" to describe the target of economic policy and reforms. "Disorderly" has also been translated as "irrational". This "expansion" has been construed as responsible for the monopolistic tendencies of technology companies, expensive tutoring for children, and other issues in China.

Ant Group made major changes to its ownership structure and corporate governance in January 2023. That month, Ant Group announced a series of changes in shareholder voting rights, and its founder Jack Ma will no longer be the actual controller of Ant Group. Ma's voting rights were reduced from 50% to 6%. Following these changes, no single shareholder has a controlling stake in the company. The company's board also added another independent director. The Chinese government spoke positively of Ant Group's changes, including describing them as improvements in transparency and accountability.

== Acceleration of reform ==
=== Comments by Xi and SAMR expansion ===
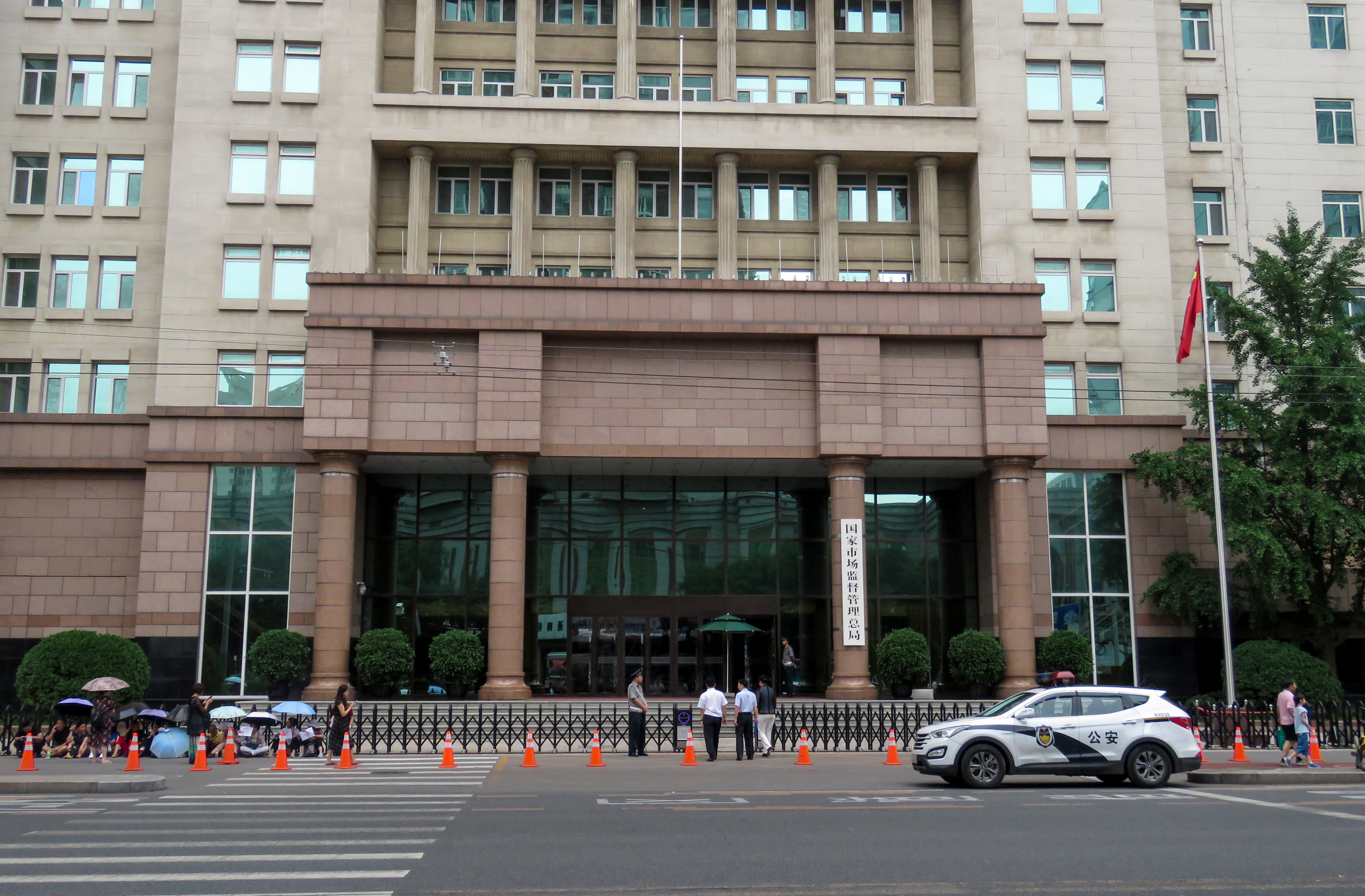
Entrance to SAMR headquarters

Xi Jinping called for further regulation of tech companies and platform companies in March 2021. Major platform companies in China include Alibaba and Tencent. Xi further called for existing financial regulations to apply to all financial transactions. The nation's anti-trust authority, the State Administration for Market Regulation, began hiring new staff the month after Xi made these comments. Reuters reported the regulatory body aimed to add between 20 and 30 staff, adding to their then-current headcount of 40. Reuters also reported that SAMR would have a larger budget and would be granted other resources.

In April 2021, the same month Reuters reported on SAMR's growth, Alibaba was fined $2.8 billion. The fine was issued in response to Alibaba's practice of compelling third-party merchants using its site to choose between listing their offerings on Alibaba and the company's rivals, rather than on both. Financial and legal commentators interpreted this fine as the end of action against Alibaba.

=== Ban of cryptocurrencies ===
China's Vice Premier Liu He announced that China would take steps against the mining and trading of bitcoin in May 2021 without providing other information. The announcement caused the price of the digital asset to decline. China had previously become popular with bitcoin miners due to cheap electricity prices but the hikes in the usage of coal power associated with mining clash with China's climate-related goals. The popularity of mining in China may have led to increases in the illegal extraction of coal. Though many miners have shuttered or moved their operations, Chinese authorities have continued to search for illegal operators continuing to work disguised as other businesses.

In September 2021, the People's Bank of China banned all cryptocurrency transactions and related transactions. This announcement caused the price of bitcoin to fall approximately 8%. The central bank also banned foreign companies from providing cryptocurrency services to Chinese citizens. Regulations from earlier in the year had banned domestic companies from providing services like cryptocurrency trading.

=== Restriction of for-profit tutoring ===
On July 24, 2021, rules were introduced to change the operation of tutoring companies focused on teaching school-age children. The new rules prohibit these companies from turning a profit, prohibit them from raising foreign capital, and prohibit tutoring related to the school syllabus on holidays and weekends. Other regulations include the banning of the tutoring of children under six years old. Commentators referred to the new regulations as, effectively, a "death penalty" for the industry. American investment firms impacted by the new rules include Sequoia, Tiger Global Management, and Warburg Pincus. Other foreign firms impacted include Singaporean state-owned conglomerate Temasek Holdings.

The ban resulted in the emergence of "underground" tutoring services, advertised using other descriptions by those offering them. The Ministry of Education announced it would seek to eliminate these services by pursuing companies and individuals offering them in September 2021.

=== Regulatory scrutiny of Didi ===
DiDi, a Chinese vehicle-for-hire company headquartered in Beijing, went public in June 2021. The company listed in the United States, becoming the largest Chinese trading debut since Alibaba's IPO in 2014. On July 4, 2021, the Cyberspace Administration of China ordered app stores to remove DiDi, after citing violations on the company's collection and usage of personal information. DiDi had disclosed to potential investors that increased regulatory scrutiny was possible. In July, Chinese regulators fined DiDi for failing to disclose acquisitions. DiDi allegedly considered going private in late July. The company denied these claims.

Regulators asked Didi to create a plan to delist from American exchanges in November 2021. The company initially intended to either return to its previous status as a private company or to relist in Hong Kong.

According to Chinese regulators, the company had delivered sensitive data to the United States Securities and Exchange Commission. The CAC cited the National Security Law, the 2017 Cybersecurity Law, and Measures on Cybersecurity Review as the basis for its approach. The cybersecurity investigation of DiDi coincided with nationalistic public sentiment against the company.

=== Other consumer internet regulatory action ===
In summer 2021, the Ministry of Industry and Information Technology began a six-month long regulatory campaign to address a variety of consumer protection and unfair competition issues, including interoperability concerns, in the consumer internet sector. It held meetings with executives from major Chinese tech companies and instructed them that their companies could no longer block external links to competitors.

In July 2021, the Chinese government instructed Tencent and other 13 other tech companies to rectify intrusive pop-up windows. The same month, twenty-five tech companies were ordered to address data security and consumer rights protection.

SAMR fined Meituan $534 million in October 2021 in response to its practice of demanding that retailers using their app sign exclusivity agreements. The fine was lower than expected, leading to an increase in Meituan's share price.

In 2021, China instituted two laws on data security and privacy: (1) the Data Security Law and (2) the Personal Information Protection Law. The Chinese government issued a number of major tech sector policy documents in 2021, including the "Guiding Opinions on Strengthening the Overall Governance of Internet Information Service Algorithms" to address issues like price discrimination, algorithmic recommendations, and internet addiction.

During the reform spree, the government increasingly took golden share stakes in companies in order to maintain control of the private sector, especially technology firms.

== Other reforms and actions ==
=== Three child policy ===
China modified its longstanding one child policy in 2016 and allowed couples to have two children. The policy was updated again in 2021, allowing couples to have three children. This modification to policy was announced on 31 May 2021, at a meeting of the Politburo of the Chinese Communist Party. The policy went into effect in August 2021. Two months later, the policy was abolished and all family planning restrictions were lifted.

=== Labor laws ===
On August 27, 2021, the Supreme People's Court with the Ministry of Human Resources and Social Security issued a public notice that China's 996 work schedule utilized by big technology companies was illegal. While no new laws were implemented, it signaled that the government would step up enforcement of existing laws, under which the 996 work schedule should not exist and overtime beyond 44 hours per week should be paid out.

Since the beginning of the reform spree, administrative bodies and courts have taken an increasingly protective view of platform economy workers and have issued a series of measures designed to improve their labor conditions.

=== Social reforms ===
In August 2021, the National Press and Publication Administration announced video game usage by minors would be restricted to 90 minutes during weekdays and 3 hours during weekends. There have also been crackdowns on idol worship, fandom and celebrity culture and cracking down on "sissy men."

=== Mutual aid companies ===
Mutual-aid companies such as Xianghubao had sought to crowd-fund medical coverage while avoiding being characterized as an insurance product. Following the reform spree, many other such companies shut down.

== Contemporaneous events ==
=== Evergrande liquidity crisis ===
Despite the "three red lines", Chinese real estate developer and conglomerate Evergrande released a statement on 31 August 2021, warning it would default on its debts if it failed to raise enough cash to cover them. At the time, Evergrande was China's most indebted real estate developer. On 24 September 2021, Evergrande missed off-shore bond payments totaling US$83.5 million. While the company had 30 days to avoid defaulting on the debt, analysts felt the company would likely fail to pay its creditors.

== Future plans ==
The State Council of the People's Republic of China and the Central Committee of the Chinese Communist Party together released a five-year plan outlining plans for regulations and updated laws in August 2021. The plan calls for the continued introduction of rules and reform governing portions of the economy including the technology sector, finance, and defense.

== Impact ==
The reform instilled "paranoia and paralysis" at Chinese technology companies. The reforms also decreased the number of jobs available at technology companies, increasing the unemployment rate among young people.

In July 2023, the Chinese government officially ended its wave of regulatory action in the tech industry. That month, Premier Li Qiang met with representatives of major tech companies to convey the "strongest signal" in support of the industry. Central government bodies and numerous local governments then introduces policy support for the platform economy designed to increase economic growth and the creation of jobs.
