= Chutian Golden News =

Chinese Newspaper

Chutian Golden Post
- Native name: 楚天金报
- Type: Daily newspaper
- Founded: November 18, 2001
- Ceased publication: December 1, 2017
- Language: Chinese
- Headquarters: Wuhan
- Website: ctjb.cnhubei.com

Chutian Golden News or Chutian Jinbao (Chinese: 楚天金报), also known as Chutian Golden Post or Chutian Golden Paper, was a simplified Chinese "citizen's life" newspaper published in the People's Republic of China. It was a subsidiary of the Hubei Daily.

The Chutian Golden News was inaugurated on November 18, 2001, and ceased publication on December 1, 2017.

== History ==
Chutian Golden Post was approved by the National Press and Publication General Administration of China in October 2001, and officially launched on November 18, 2001.

On February 21, 2012, it was revamped to focus on the three major areas of "finance", "emotion" and "people's livelihood."

The newspaper ceased operations on December 1, 2017, with related operations merged into Chutian Metropolis Daily (楚天都市报).
