= Shutdown law =

Former South Korean law restricting gaming for children

Youth Protection Revision Act
- The emblem of the National Assembly of Korea.

National Assembly of South Korea
- Passed: 19 May 2011
- Commenced: 20 November 2011
- Status: Repealed

The Youth Protection Revision Act, commonly known as the Shutdown Law or Cinderella Law, was an act of the South Korean National Assembly which forbade children under the age of sixteen to play video games between the hours of 00:00 and 06:00. The legislature passed the law on 19 May 2011 and it went into effect on 20 November 2011. The law was abolished in August 2021.

== Overview ==
Between the hours of 00:00 and 06:00, access to online games was blocked for all under the age of sixteen. The law led those under sixteen to commit identity theft, as underage South Koreans stole resident registration numbers in an effort to elude the law. The shutdown law targeted online games, but did not affect console games and mobile games. However, due to performance difficulties of the law in certain cases, they decided to entirely ban all console games as well as gaming networks of some companies, such as Xbox Live or PSN. Legal challenges against the law were filed by a group of Korean game manufacturers and a cultural organization. After 2 September 2014, parents could request that their children be exempted from the law.

== Constitutionality ==
Internet game service providers filed a constitutional complaint about the shutdown law. They claimed that parts of the law infringed on the freedom of young people, the freedom of the game provider's occupation, the general freedom of action possessed by youths, and the rights of parents. The Constitutional Court of Korea rejected the complaint.

The court agreed that young people have the right to play video games but that the shutdown law did not infringe on their rights or liberty because video game addiction is detrimental to health. The court stated the rights of parents are not absolute and that the government can exercise control on families in dangerous situations. The court did not agree that the shutdown law unfairly targeted online game providers because online games are more addictive than other types of games.

== History ==
In October 2004, some civic groups called for the government to pass a shutdown law because teenagers needed their sleep. The advocacy groups organized a forum. Kim Jae Gyeong of the Grand National Party (Hannara) proposed the Juvenile Protection Act amendment in 2005. This amendment was an early version of the shutdown law. Game industry lobbyists and actions by the Ministry of Culture and Tourism would kill the legislation. The next year, another member of the GNP, Kim Hi Jeong, proposed an "act on preventing and solving internet addiction, including online games". This bill would require games to warn players that the games are addictive and penalize players, especially teens, who play too long. This bill also failed for reasons similar to the 2005 defeat.

On 10 July 2008, Kim Jae Gyeong proposed the Juvenile Protection Act amendment, which required online game providers to prohibit teens from playing their games between the hours of 00:00 and 06:00. The amendment set out penalties for game companies who did not comply. The penalties are a fine of up to ₩10,000,000 or US$9,624 and up to 2 years in jail. One year later, Cho Yeong Hi, of the United Democratic Party proposed a similar amendment on 22 April 2009. It included the prohibition of online game service to young people from 00:00 to 06:00, the requirement of parental approval for the play of online games for teenagers, and required game providers to warn players about internet gaming addiction. The possible punishment for a violation was identical to the punishment mentioned in the previous proposed amendment.

The Ministry of Culture and Tourism and the Ministry of Gender Equality and Family were to introduce separate shutdown law amendments but decided to work together to develop one amendment that would be accepted by the legislature. They completed their version of the shutdown law bill on 3 June 2010. The shutdown law bill, which was included in the Juvenile Protection Act amendment, was introduced at the South Korea National Assembly plenary session and the bill was passed on 29 April 2011.

The shutdown law went into effect on 20 November 2011. It was applied to every online game in service in South Korea. Teenagers under seventeen years of age were not allowed to play online video games between the hours of 00:00 and 06:00. The law affected some online social games and every online game service that required a resident registration number.

On 24 April 2014, the constitutional court ruled that the shutdown law was constitutional.

As of August 2021, the law has been abolished.

== Similar laws in other countries ==
=== China ===
In 2007, China introduced an Online Game Addiction Prevention System (Fatigue System). The fatigue system outlined a method to reduce the rewards in games, more specifically the item drop rate, after a certain amount of time has been passed. This method was different than others that proposed forced termination after playing a game for a certain period of time. Once a player reached a cumulative three to five hours of play, the game would reduce rewards by 50%. Once they reached over five hours of play in total, the game would not give out any rewards. The fatigue system did not work well and was discarded.

According to the China Internet Network Information Center, the age of first-time Internet access for minors is steadily declining and the Internet usage rate for minors is consistently increasing. Additionally, most minors are using the Internet, and 70% of offences committed by minors are caused by the Internet. In 2016, China took steps to reduce the negative impact of the Internet on minors and passed the Minors Internet Protection Ordinance.

The ordinance includes restrictions on nighttime gaming and length of gaming sessions for minors, required online gaming service providers to change rules to reduce addiction, provided for education and guidance of minors, and required manufacturers to install software for the protection of minors.

Under the 2019 law, individuals under 18 were allowed to play games for 1 1/2 hours a day on most games. However, as of August 30, 2021, China's National Press and Publication Administration (General Administration of Press and Publication) published new rules, stating that individuals under 18 will be allowed to play video games one hour a day between 8 PM and 9 PM on Fridays, weekends, and legal holidays. The government announcements said all online video games will be required to connect to an "anti-addiction" system operated by the National Press and Publication Administration; however, this system can be circumvented with a VPN. Starting Wednesday, September 1, 2021, games will require all users to register using their real names and government-issued identification documents.

=== Vietnam ===
In 2010, the Ministry of Information and Communications (Vietnam) had cut off overnight public Internet access in businesses and banned advertisements of online games, pending new regulations, amid public outcry over their influence on youth, the state-run news agency reported. The move also temporarily halted the licensing of online games. Vietnamese officials announced the decision Tuesday and said it would remain in effect until the end of the year. Government officials said they hope to crack down on games with violent, gambling, and pornographic content and rate said games, according to Việt Nam News.

In 2011, according to the Daily Mail, the country is introducing a ban on all online gaming activity from 10 PM to 8 AM in order to protect the youth from wasting their brains. "Provincial departments of information and communication will inspect online games activities nationwide and deal with organizations that violate regulations by canceling their services." Deputy Prime Minister of Vietnam Le Nam Thang said, adding that officials have tried other methods which have not been proven effective. According to the article, internet service providers have until March 3 to comply with the shutoff or they will be cut off by the Vietnamese government. Gamasutra (now Game Developer) points out that China has put stringent restrictions on their country's young gamers, including making games with "unwholesome" content including pornography, violence, gambling, cults, and material classified as "cruel" or "horrifying" illegal, outlawing real currency in games in lieu of virtual currency, and putting heavy restrictions on minors "buying" products in the gaming world.

=== Japan ===
Since the morning of March 18, 2020, the prefectural assembly of Kagawa passed the Ordinance for Measures Against Internet and Game Addiction, which recommends children under the age of 18 to play video games for no more than 60 minutes on weekdays and no more than 90 minutes on weekends and holidays. Additionally, smartphone use is recommended to be limited up to 9pm for young students and by 10pm for older students. It is not enforced and it does not carry penalties.

=== Taiwan ===
In 2015, the Child and Youth Welfare Protection Act was introduced. The Act prohibits parents and legal guardians from allowing children under the age of 18 to have excessive screen time, and children under the age of 2 from having electronic devices, except for medical and educational purposes. Violations are punishable with fines for of up to NT$50,000, or approximately £1200.00, if children suffer from physical or mental illness from excessive screentime or using electronic device under the age of 2. Internet cafes are banned from allowing minors after 10pm.
