= Lee Eun-jeong =

Lee Eun-jeong (이은정) or Ri Un-jong (리은정) may refer to:

- Lee Eun-jeong (police officer) (born 1965), South Korean police officer
- Lee Eun-jeong (tennis) (born 1976), South Korean tennis player
- Lee Eun-jung (born 1981), South Korean long-distance runner
- Yi Eun-jung (born 1988), South Korean golfer
