= Heze Daily =

Chinese Communist Party newspaper

Heze Daily<
- Native name: 菏泽日报
- Type: Daily newspaper
- Founded: October 1, 1991
- Political alignment: Chinese Communist Party
- Language: Chinese
- Headquarters: Heze, Shandong
- OCLC number: 123257305
- Website: epaper.hezeribao.com

Heze Daily (Chinese: 菏泽日报), also known as Heze Ribao, is a Shandong-based simplified Chinese newspaper published in the People's Republic of China, it is the organ newspaper of the Heze Municipal Committee of the Chinese Communist Party.

Heze Daily was inaugurated on October 1, 1991, and its predecessor was Heze Public (菏泽大众). It is sponsored and supervised by the Heze Municipal Committee of the CCP, and is published by Heze Daily Agency (菏泽日报社).

== History ==
Heze Daily was founded on October 1, 1991. On October 1, 2000, with the approval of the General Administration of Press and Publication, it launched a lifestyle newspaper, the Peony Evening Post .
