= Chinese reforms =

Chinese reforms or Chinese reform may refer to a number of events from Chinese history:

- Hundred Days' Reform, failed Qing dynasty reforms in the 1898
- Reform and opening up, a variety of economic reforms in China beginning in the late-1970s
- Thought reform in China, Chinese campaign focused on the acceptance of Marxism–Leninism in the 1950s
- Healthcare reform in China, reforms to the Chinese healthcare system
- 2020–2021 Xi Jinping Administration reform spree, ongoing reforms to the economy and culture of China by the Chinese Communist Party
