= Science Guide =

Science Guid
- Native name: 科学导报
- Publisher: Science Guide Agency
- Founded: January 4, 1985
- Language: Chinese
- Headquarters: Taiyuan
- OCLC number: 123258794
- Website: kxdb.com

Science Guide (Chinese: 科学导报), also known as Science and Technology Review, is a simplified Chinese newspaper published in the People's Republic of China. The newspaper was officially founded on January 4, 1985, its predecessor was Science and Technology Newspaper (科技消息报), and was renamed Science Guide in October 2002 with the approval of the General Administration of Press and Publication. It is sponsored and supervised by the Shanxi Association for Science and Technology (山西省科学技术协会).

== Controversies ==
In 2008, when a safety incident occurred at the Huobao Ganhe Coal Mine (霍宝干河煤矿) in Shanxi province, real and fake journalists scrambled to get there - not to cover the incident, but to collect "hush money" from the mine. Among them, Niu Jianli (牛建黎), a journalist from the Science Guide, received 10,000 yuan from as the "hush money". After the scandal came to light, Niu's press card was revoked and he was ordered to return the stolen money, and the Shanxi provincial press and publication administration department imposed an administrative penalty of one warning and a fine of 30,000 yuan on the Science Guide Agency.
