= Anti-Addiction System for Online Games =

Chinese system for minors and gaming

The Anti-Addiction System for Online Games is a system developed in accordance with the Standard for Anti-Addiction System for Online Games issued by the General Administration of Press and Publication (GAPP) of the People's Republic of China, which was implemented in 2007, with the aim of restricting minors to prevent them from becoming addicted to online games for a long period of time. The GAPP issued "Notice of the National Press and Publication Administration on Further Strict Management and Effective Prevention of Minors' Addiction to Online Games" in August 2021, based on General Secretary Xi Jinping's instructions on youth work. Chinese authorities have claimed that it is the most advanced and efficient anti-addiction system in the world. Its strict regulations have therefore led to some controversy.

== Implementation ==
In August 2005, the Chinese government notified China's seven largest online game companies (Shanda, NetEase, The9, Guang tong, Kingsoft, Sina, Sohu, etc.) to publish the "Online Game Anti-Addiction System Development Standard" and required them to submit it. In September 2005, online game operators gradually installed online game anti-addiction systems in their products and conducted trial runs. In March 2006, the basic development work was completed, and the "Notice on Implementing an Anti-addiction System for Online Games to Protect the Physical and Mental Health of Minors" decided to implement an anti-addiction system for online games in China from 15 April 2007, and ordered its full implementation on 16 July.

== Principles ==
According to the regulations issued by the General Administration of Press and Publication of the People's Republic of China, the system will issue reminders when it monitors players' game time approaching three hours. If it exceeds three hours, the system will continuously warn the player to stop playing. At the same time, within three to five hours, the game's benefits (including experience value, treasure drop rate, honor value, reputation value, etc.) will drop to 50% of the original value, and after five hours, there will be none at all. The system also stipulates that after a player has played a full healthy game, the account must also go through a cumulative interval of five hours of offline time before it can be activated normally. In Tencent games, underage players or players without real-name authentication can only play for one hour in the evening from 7:00 pm to 8:00 pm on holidays and weekends and will be forced offline by the system if they play more than this time.

== Enforcement and reinforcement ==
Kou Xiaowei, head of the anti-addiction system at the General Administration of Press and Publication of the People's Republic of China, stated in an interview that the anti-addiction system will be implemented in all online games if it achieves good results and is fully recognized by the community after the trial run.

On the other hand, the General Administration of Press and Publication has explained some of the controversy surrounding the increasingly harsh nature of the system, affirming that moderate games can improve the family atmosphere and that games are positive for the development of art and imagination, while pointing out that the responsibility for addiction lies with parents, mainly because they do not pay enough attention to their children. It is not appropriate to shirk their inadequate supervision of children by playing games. There are no restrictions on educational games and quality games. Parents can accompany the game and control the playing time Some news articles commented that the proportion of minors in the company's income is actually not high. They believe that this will not affect the development of the game industry but will give manufacturers something to rely on. In this strict supervision, which is known as a one-step system, they admit that some details do not achieve appropriate and precise goals.

It is believed that the classification system should be implemented next, and the goal should be to be able to unleash all efforts to produce excellent games and continue to guide and expand China's game culture

== Loopholes and doubts ==
Although online game companies can require verification of the registrant's identity certificate at registration to achieve the purpose of identifying minors, minors can avoid being restricted by the anti-addiction system by stealing the identity certificate of an adult.

== See also ==
- Shutdown law
