= Won Min-kyong =

South Korean politician (born 1971)

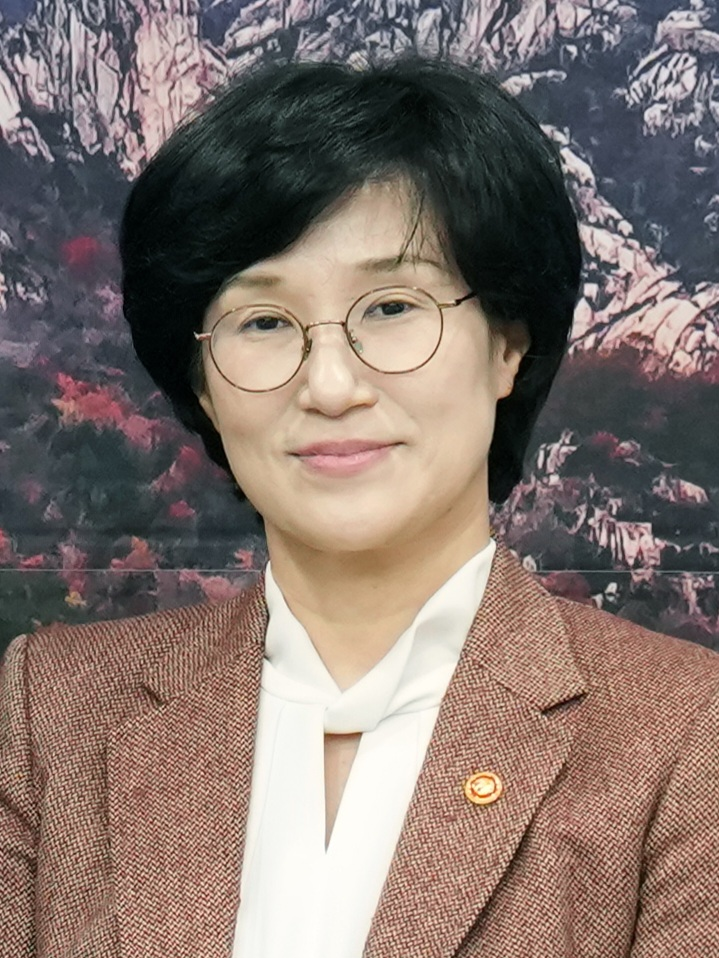
- Won in 2025

Minister of Gender Equality and Family
- Incumbent
- Assumed office September 10, 2025
- President: Lee Jae Myung
- Preceded by: Kim Hyun-sook

Non-Standing Member of the National Human Rights Commission
- In office July 2023 – September 2025

Personal details
- Born: August 23, 1971 (age 54) Seoul, South Korea

Won Min-kyong (Korean: 원민경; born August 23, 1971) is a South Korean politician who has served as the minister of gender equality and family since 2025. She served as a non-standing member of the National Human Rights Commission of Korea from 2023 to 2025.

== Biography ==
Won was born in Seoul on August 23, 1971. She passed the 40th National Bar Examination, later working at multiple law firms. Won was the chair of the Lawyers for a Democratic Society Women's Rights Committee chairperson. She also served in the Gender Equality Committee in the Ministry for National Defense and vice-president of the Korean Association of Gender and Law. Won was appointed as a non-standing member of the National Human Rights Commission in July 2023.

Won served on the nomination management committee for the Democratic Party of Korea in the 21st general election. Won was appointed the Minister of Gender Equality and Family in September 2025, becoming the inaugural Minister of Gender Equality and Family in October of that same year. Won is the first Minister to serve in the Ministry since it changed its Korean name from the Ministry of Gender Equality and Family to the Ministry of Women and Family.

In March 2026, Won apologized to former prostitutes who previously worked in brothels near American military bases for the violation of their rights. More than three years before the apology, the Supreme Court of Korea ordered the South Korean government to pay each of the prostitutes between 3 and 7 million won each to the prostitutes who worked in brothels near American military bases.
