= Chung Young-ai =

South Korean academic (born 1955)

- 정영애
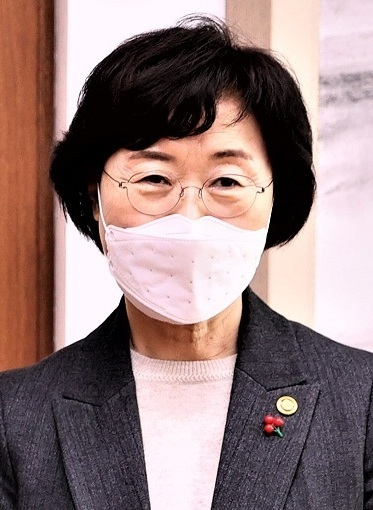

Minister of Gender Equality and Family
- In office 29 December 2020 – 9 May 2022
- President: Moon Jae-in
- Prime Minister: Chung Sye-kyun
- Preceded by: Lee Jung-ok
- Succeeded by: Kim Hyun-sook

Senior Secretary to the President for Personnel Affairs
- In office 21 December 2007 – 24 February 2008
- President: Roh Moo-hyun
- Preceded by: Park Nam-choon
- Succeeded by: position abolished

Secretary to the President for Personnel Affairs
- In office December 2003 – February 2006
- President: Roh Moo-hyun

Personal details
- Born: 1955 (age 70–71)
- Education: Ewha Womans University

Chung Young-ai (Korean: 정영애; Hanja: 鄭英愛; born 1955) is a South Korean professor of social welfare at Seoul Cyber University served as Minister of Gender Equality and Family from 2020 to 2022. She is the first Korean to hold a doctorate degree in women's studies.

In 1997 Chung was an advisor to the preceding agency of the Ministry, the Second Ministry of State for Political Affairs. A year later, she moved to South Chungcheong Provincial Governor's Office where she served as its first women's policy administrator for almost five years. In January 2003 she joined then-President-elect Roh Moo-hyun's transition team as a member of social, cultural and women's affairs division. Later that year Chung was appointed as Roh's presidential secretary for personnel affairs and continued to work for Roh til 2006. In 2007 she returned to Roh's Office of the President and served as a senior presidential secretary for personnel affairs, a vice-ministerial position, till the end of Roh's presidency in February 2008.

Chung holds three degrees from Ewha Womans University - a bachelor and a master's in sociology and a doctorate in women's studies.
