= Lee Eun-jeong (police officer) =

South Korean police officer (born 1965)

- 이은정

President of Sports Ethics Center
- Incumbent
- Assumed office 29 April 2021
- President: Moon Jae-in
- Minister: Hwang Hee
- Preceded by: Lee Sook-jin

President of Korean National Police University
- In office 1 January 2020 – 31 December 2020
- Preceded by: Lee Joon-sub
- Succeeded by: Choi Hye-young

Dean of Central Police Academy
- In office 4 July 2019 – 30 December 2019
- Preceded by: Jung Chang-bae
- Succeeded by: Woo Jong-soo

Personal details
- Born: 1965 (age 60–61)
- Education: Dongguk University

Lee Eun-jeong (Korean: 이은정; Hanja: 李銀晶; born 1965) is a South Korean police officer currently serving as the President of the Sports Ethics Center of Ministry of Culture, Sports and Tourism from April 2021. Lee previously served as the head of Central Police Academy and Korean National Police University under President Moon Jae-in from 2019 to 2020.

She is the first woman to lead the police academy and the second woman to lead the police university since their foundation in 1987 and 1979 respectively. She was previously the second woman to become a director-general in the Korean Police Agency equivalent to Senior Superintendent General in 2018 and the fifth woman to become a Superintendent General of the Agency in 2015.

A month after the first president of the Centre resigned due to its lack of investigative power, Lee was appointed to lead the Centre.

She started her career as a police officer in 1988 when she passed the special recruitment exam as an assistant inspector (or sergeant).

She graduated from Dongguk University majoring in police administration in 1988.
