= Lee Jung-ok (sociologist) =

- 이정옥
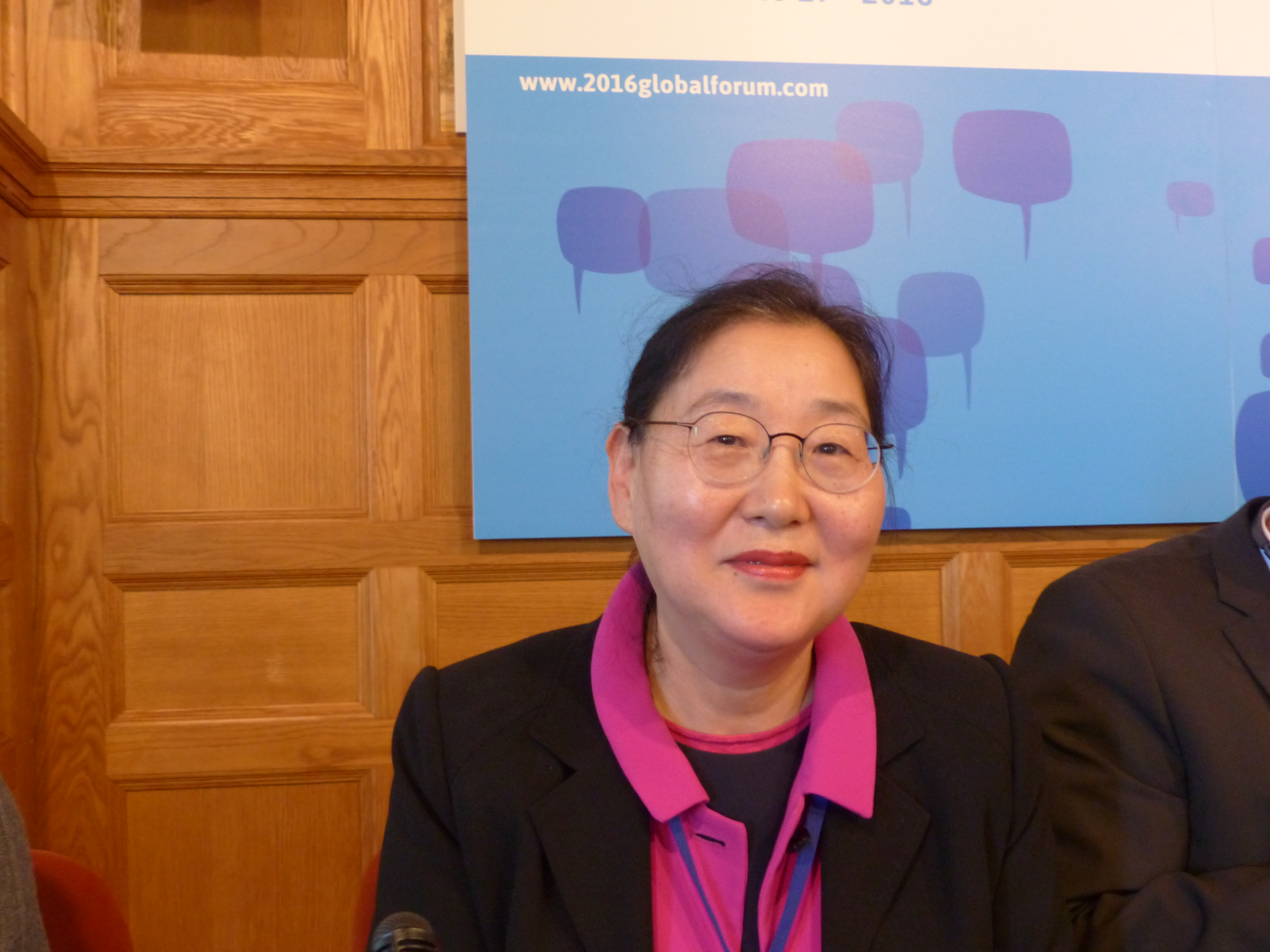

Minister of Gender Equality and Family
- In office 9 September 2019 – 28 December 2020
- President: Moon Jae-in
- Prime Minister: Lee Nak-yeon; Chung Sye-kyun
- Preceded by: Jin Sun-mee
- Succeeded by: Chung Young-ai

Personal details
- Born: 1955 (age 70–71) Jeonju, South Korea
- Party: Independent
- Education: Seoul National University

Lee Jung-ok (Korean: 이정옥; Hanja: 李貞玉; born 1955) is a South Korean professor of sociology at Catholic University of Daegu previously served as Minister of Gender Equality and Family under President Moon Jae-in from 2019 to 2020.

Lee has been active in academia, government and civil societies - both domestic and international.

From 1986, Lee taught sociology at Hyosung Women's College until 1992 when she transferred to its successor, Catholic University of Daegu, as an associate professor of sociology. Since then she took multiple roles in her university and later promoted to professor. From 2011, she is a dean of Graduate School of Social Economy and a director of Social Sciences Research Institute. From 2016 to 2018, she was a dean of College of Social Sciences and its School of Sociology. She was also previously a visiting scholar at Waseda University and Harvard University.

She is currently a director of Korean Association of Women's Studies as well as a senior advisor and ex-president of the Korean Association of NGO Studies.

Before appointed to Minister, Lee was the co-chair of Gender Equality Committee of Ministry of National Defense, co-president of Women's Forum for Peace & Diplomacy and chair of International Cooperation Committee of Korea Democracy Foundation. She was previously a member and chair of Public Interest Activity Promotion (Nonprofit organization) Committee of Seoul Metropolitan Government.

Moreover, Lee is a director of Transparency International Korea from February 2019. From 1995 to 1999, she led the International Human Rights Centre of People's Solidarity for Participatory Democracy as its assistant director and later director. In 1999, Lee became the co-president of Korean House for International Solidarity.

Furthermore, Lee is currently a board member of Democracy International based in Cologne and an international fellow of Asia Regional Exchange for New Alternatives based in Hong Kong.

Lee graduated from Seoul National University with three degrees: bachelor in English Education and master and doctorate in sociology.
