= National Press and Publication Administration =

Chinese Communist Party organization

- 国家新闻出版署
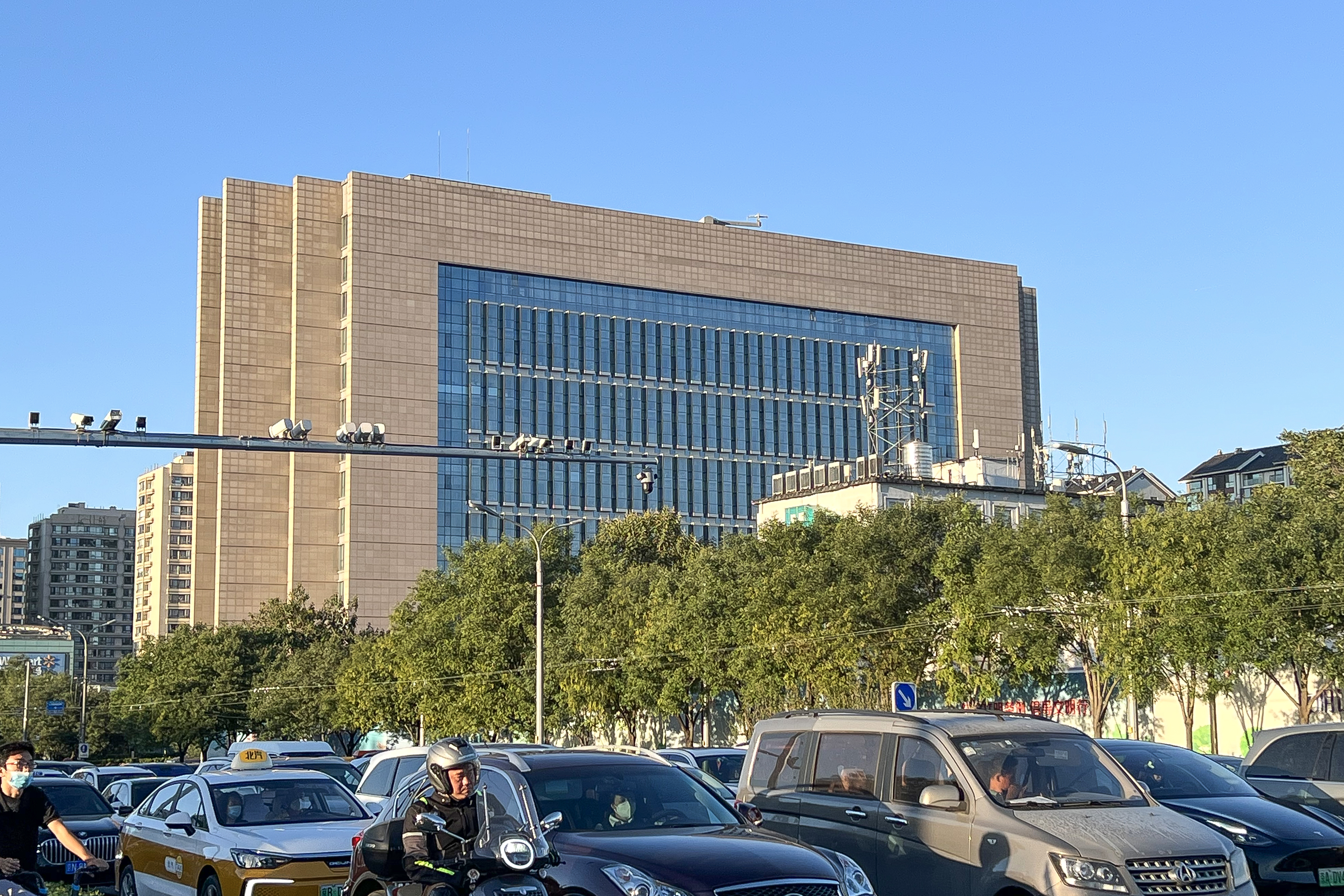
- Headquarters

Agency overview
- Formed: April 16, 2018
- Jurisdiction: Government of China
- Status: External name of the Publicity Department of the Chinese Communist Party; institution directly under the State Council
- Headquarters: No. 40 Xuanwumenwai Street, Xicheng District, Beijing
- Website: www.nppa.gov.cn

Chinese name
- Simplified Chinese: 国家新闻出版署
- Traditional Chinese: 國家新聞出版署
Transcriptions
Standard Mandarin
- Hanyu Pinyin: Guójiā Xīnwén Chūbǎnshǔ

The National Press and Publication Administration (NPPA) is an external name of the Publicity Department of the Chinese Communist Party.

The NPPA is mainly responsible for formulating news and publishing management policies and supervising their implementation, managing news and publishing administrative affairs, supervising the content and quality of publications, and managing the import of publications.

== History ==
In March 2018, as part of the deepening the reform of the Party and state institutions, the news and publication management responsibilities of the State Administration of Press, Publication, Radio, Film and Television (SAPPRFT) was transferred to the Publicity Department, which also would use the name of the National Press and Publication Administration as a one institution with two names. On 22 March 2018, the State Council notified that the National Press and Publication Administration (National Copyright Administration) would be incorporated into the Publicity Department, which would assume relevant responsibilities. On 16 April 2018, the National Press and Publication Administration was officially established.

Among the functions it continued from SAPPRFT was promoting and recommending works of internet literature which it deemed outstanding for the works' promotion of socialist values.

In 2019, China's National Press and Publication Administration held a high-level seminar in Beijing, highlighting 95 award-winning projects selected from over 500 submissions as part of its first national initiative to promote high-quality development in digital publishing.

On 25 October 2019, the National Press and Publication Administration issued the "Notice of the State Press and Publication Administration on Preventing Minors from Becoming Addicted to Online Games" which stipulates that online gaming enterprises are not allowed to provide gaming services to minors between 10:00 p.m. and 8:00 a.m. Additionally, it restricts gaming service durations for minors to a maximum of three hours per day on statutory holidays and 1.5 hours per day on other days.

On 30 August 2021, it issued the, "Notice of the National Press and Publication Administration on Further Strict Management to Effectively Prevent Minors from Becoming Addicted to Online Games," which was issued at the start of the school year to set clear and specific requirements aimed at improving the effectiveness of anti-addiction measures and fostering a healthier environment for minors.

== Organization ==
According to relevant regulations, the National Press and Publication Administration was added to the Publicity Department, which is responsible for its specific work. The Publicity Department set up the following institutions in the press and publication field:

- Publishing House
- Media Regulatory Authority
- Printing and Distribution Bureau
- Anti-Illegal and Anti-Prohibition Bureau (National Anti-Pornography and Anti-Illegal Publications Working Group Office)
- Copyright Administration
- Import and Export Administration
