= Notice of the National Press and Publication Administration on Further Strict Management and Effective Prevention of Minors' Addiction to Online Games =

Chinese legal document

Document
- Territorial extent: China
- Enacted by: National Press and Publication Administration
- Commenced: 1 September 2021

Legislative history
- Introduced: 30 August 2021
- Status: In force

"Notice of the National Press and Publication Administration on Further Strict Management to Effectively Prevent Minors from Becoming Addicted to Online Games" is a document issued by the Chinese Communist Party's (CCP) National Press and Publication Administration.

Issued on 30 August 2021, the document introduces stricter management measures to address the problem of minors' excessive use of and/or addiction to online games. It additionally sets out requirements for major online game providers in mainland China regarding anti-addiction mechanisms for minors.

== Background and purpose ==
On 25 October 2019, the National Press and Publication Administration issued the "Notice of the State Press and Publication Administration on Preventing Minors from Becoming Addicted to Online Games" which stipulates that online gaming enterprises are not allowed to provide gaming services to minors between 10:00 p.m. and 8:00 a.m. Additionally, it restricts gaming service duration for minors to a maximum of three hours per day on statutory holidays and 1.5 hours per day on other days.

In July 2021, the General Office of the Chinese Communist Party and the General Office of the State Council issued the "Opinions on Further Reducing the Burden of Homework for Students in Compulsory Education and the Burden of Out-of-School Training" which mentions the need to prevent minors from becoming addicted to the internet.

On 3 August of the same year, the Economic Reference Daily published a report entitled "'Mental Opium' Grows into Hundreds of Billions of Dollars Industry" in reference to online games as a new type of "drug" and "mental opium." The report led to a decline in the stock market value of online gaming companies, with a nearly 300 billion yuan reduction in market capitalization. However, the report was soon deleted, and later that day, a revised version was published under the title "Online Games Have Grown into a Hundreds of Billions of Dollars Industry" with terms like "mental opium" and "electronic drugs" removed.

Although previous governmental notices addressed concerns about minors' gaming habits, many parents believed the restrictions were still too lenient. This prompted the introduction of stricter specifications in response to public opinion. The National Press and Publication Administration emphasized that the rapid development of China's gaming industry has led to significant concerns about minors becoming addicted to online games, with strong reactions from parents.

Issued on 30 August 2021, the new notice, "Notice of the National Press and Publication Administration on Further Strict Management to Effectively Prevent Minors from Becoming Addicted to Online Games," was issued at the start of the school year to set clear and specific requirements aimed at improving the effectiveness of anti-addiction measures and fostering a healthier environment for minors.

== Substance ==
The notice imposes strict limits on the time that online game services can be provided to minors: "all online game enterprises can only provide 1 hour of service to minors on Fridays, Saturdays, Sundays [b] and legal holidays from 20:00 to 21:00 daily, and other times are not allowed to provide any form of service".

The notice also mandates the strict implementation of real-name registration for game accounts and prohibits services for unregistered accounts. Management departments at all levels are required to enforce supervision and review, and gaming companies that fail to comply will face legal consequences.

Additionally, the notice stresses the need for families, schools, and society to cooperate in managing and guiding minors, ensuring a positive environment for their healthy development.

== Implementation and impact ==
Following the notice, over 10 online gaming companies immediately implemented the new regulations on 31 August 2021. JD removed 87 games from its online markets, including Call of Duty, Grand Theft Auto, Animal Crossing and FIFA. Some gaming companies provided compensation measures for minors unable to log in daily for rewards. For example, MiHoYo distributed prepaid daily login rewards for its games Genshin Impact and Honkai Impact 3rd to underage players in advance.

The stock prices of several companies linked to online gaming fell in response to the notice. On 30 August 2021, prior to the U.S. stock market opening, NetEase's U.S. stock price dropped more than 7%, and Bilibili's stock fell by 1.8%. On 31 August, Tencent's stock dropped more than 3% in the Hong Kong stock market, while in the A-share market, Perfect World, YOOZOO Interactive, Electric Soul Network, Sheng Tian Network, Jibit, ZQGame, and 37Games all saw declines of more than 4%.

On 6 September 2021, the National Office for Combating Pornography and Illegality launched the Protecting Seedlings 2021 campaign, which included efforts to prevent minors from becoming addicted to the internet. Late at night on 8 September, the Propaganda Department of the Central Committee of the Chinese Communist Party, the National Press and Publication Administration, and other departments interviewed Tencent, NetEase, and other gaming companies, stressing that no online game account rental or sale services should be offered to minors.

== Criticisms ==
Following the new regulations, there were reports of minors causing game servers, such as those for Honor of Kings, to crash due to a large influx during limited playing hours. This caused frustration among other players. Additionally, some minors fell victim to scams while trying to circumvent the anti-addiction measures.

Although the ban on online gaming is considered the "strictest in history", it does not cover overseas online games, and some underage players may choose to "go over the wall" to access foreign games, leading to a potential rise in the number of mainland Chinese players engaging with overseas titles.

Some internet users in mainland China have felt that the regulations are overly restrictive and question their effectiveness. Others are concerned about how these restrictions will affect adult gaming services. On Weibo, some users expressed concerns that China's esports teams could be negatively impacted, potentially reducing the chances of Chinese players winning awards in future esports tournaments. Bloomberg News suggested that the suspension of game license approvals after August 2021 may be linked to these developments. Smaller game developers have also been affected. For instance, the music game Synchronized Sound Meow Saik saw first-day revenues drop to just 600 RMB following the introduction of restrictions on minors.
