= Ministry of Gender Equality and Family =

Government ministry of South Korea

- 성평등가족부

Ministry overview
- Formed: October 1, 2025
- Preceding agencies: The Presidential Commission of Women's Affairs (1998–2001); Ministry of Gender Equality (2001–2005); Ministry of Gender Equality and Family (2005–2008); Ministry of Gender Equality (2008–2010); Ministry for Health, Welfare and Family (2008–2010); Ministry of Gender Equality and Family (Note: Though the English name of the agency is unchanged, the Korean name 여성가족부 is rebranded into 성평등가족부.) (2010–2025)
- Jurisdiction: Government of South Korea
- Headquarters: Central Government Complex, Jongno District, Seoul, South Korea
- Motto: A society where all family members are happy / An equal society sharing together.
- Annual budget: 302,570,000,000 Won (284,718,067 US Dollars)
- Minister responsible: Won Min-kyong
- Deputy Minister responsible: Jung Goo-Chang
- Website: www.mogef.go.kr

Korean name
- Hangul: 성평등가족부
- Hanja: 性平等家族部
- RR: Seongpyeongdeung gajokbu
- MR: Sŏngp'yŏngdŭng kajokpu

Former name
- Hangul: 여성가족부
- Hanja: 女性家族部
- RR: Yeoseong gajokbu
- MR: Yŏsŏng kajokpu

The Ministry of Gender Equality and Family (MGE; Korean: 성평등가족부), formerly the Ministry of Gender Equality (여성가족부; lit. 'Ministry of Women'), is a cabinet-level division of the government of South Korea. It was created on February 28, 1998, as the Presidential Commission on Women's Affairs. The current ministry was formed on October 1, 2025. The current minister is Won Min-kyong.

== History ==
=== Origins ===
Since the establishment of the South Korean government in August 1948, the Ministry of Social Issues (사회부; 社會部) handled discrimination against women until the department's merger in 1955. During this time, the Ministry of Social Issues merged with the Ministry of Health (보건부) to become the Ministry of Social Issues and Health (보건사회부). In 1994, the Ministry of Social Issues and Health became the Ministry of Health and Welfare (보건복지부); subsequently, the organization began to take action of sexism. However, the ministries were criticized for social positions belonging to women and the organization's unreliable enforcement of its policies.

Specific policies addressing sexism began to be addressed with the establishment of the Department Heading State Affairs (정무장관실) on February 25, 1998, after the inauguration of President Kim Dae-jung. On February 28, 1998, the Presidential Commission on Women's Affairs (여성특별위원회) was formed. On July 23, 1999, the law forbidding and regulating sexual discrimination (남녀차별 금지 및 구제에 관한 법률) was created. However, the criticism concerning the lack of advancements for women in societies continued, and the Ministry of Gender Equality (여성부) was formed as a response on January 29, 2001. The organization was established with these responsibilities: protecting the victims of domestic violence and sexual violence, prevention of prostitution, and overseeing women's occupations from the Ministry of Health and Welfare.

=== Developments ===
On June 12, 2004, the ministry received the responsibility of supervising the field of child development. On June 23, 2005, the ministry reorganized to become the Ministry of Gender Equality and Family (여성가족부) for rebranding purposes. On February 29, 2008, the ministry was renamed back to the Ministry of Gender Equality while transferring the responsibilities of overseeing families and child care to the Ministry of Health and Welfare, later changed to the Ministry for Health, Welfare and Family Affairs. On March 19, 2010, the Ministry was rearranged to become the Ministry of Gender Equality and Family, still keeping the responsibilities of overseeing teenagers and families.

== Logo ==
2005~2008

2010~2016

2016~2025

2025~present

== Organization ==
=== Objectives ===
According to the Official Ministry of Gender Equality and Family English website, the objectives are to plan and coordinate women's policy, and improve women's status through the enhancement of women's rights, establish, conciliate, and support for the family policy and multicultural family policy, foster welfare and protect youth, and prevent violence against women, children, and youth as well as victims.

=== Functions ===
According to the Official Ministry of Gender Equality and Family English website, the functions of the ministry are to plan and coordinate gender-related policies, have gender impact analysis of policies, develop and utilize women resources, expand women's participation in society, prevent sex trade and protect its victims, prevent domestic and sexual violence and protect its victims, and forge partnerships with women civil groups and international organizations.

== Controversies ==
There has been a criticism of the involvement of the word Women (여성) in the name of MOGEF, bringing charges of taking a side in the issue of gender inequality and reverse discrimination. (Note: In Korean, the Ministry of Gender Equality and Family is translated as 여성가족부 or 여성부, and the controversy here is that the word '여성,' which means "women", is included) In 2013, there was a calling for its abolition. In 2025, the ministry removed the word "women" from its Korean title for the first time since the ministry's inception in 2001. It has additionally created a Gender Equity Planning Division to address reverse discrimination against young men, particularly those in their 20s.

In 2006, the MOGEF established a policy to pay men not to hire prostitutes on men's New Year's Day parties. Men were told to sign up on the website with their national identification number, and the total budget was 3,600,000 Won (3,175 US Dollars). Crowds formed a petition to bring down MOGEF.

In November 2011, the ministry enforced a system of forced shutdown of teenage video gaming (청소년 게임 강제 셧다운제도). The law has been criticized as being ineffective, encouraging teenagers to commit the crime of using their parents' resident registration number, and restricting the production of domestic games. The law was abolished in August 2021.

== List of ministers ==
Portrait	Name	Term of office		President
Portrait	Name	Took office	Left office	President
	Won Min-kyong	Oct 2025	Incumbent	Lee Jae Myung

== See also ==
- Gender inequality in South Korea
- Women in South Korea
