= General Administration of Press and Publication =

Chinese government agency regulating publishing and media

General Administration of Press and Publication (GAPP; Chinese: 中华人民共和国新闻出版总署; pinyin: Zhōnghuá Rénmín Gònghéguó Xīnwén Chūbǎn Zǒngshǔ) is the administrative agency responsible for regulating and distributing news, print, and Internet publications in China. This included granting publication licenses for periodicals and books. GAPP has been under the direct control of the Central Propaganda Department of the Chinese Communist Party since 2018. The General Administration of Press and Publication was merged with the State Administration of Radio, Film, and Television to form the State Administration of Press, Publication, Radio, Film, and Television (Chinese: 国家新闻出版广播电影电视总局; pinyin: Guójiā Xīnwén Chūbǎn Guǎngbò Diànyǐng Diànshì Zǒngjú).

== Administration ==
The agency is administered by a few administrators.

- Director of the General Office
  - Sun Shoushan
- Director of the National Copyright Administration
  - Wang Ziqiang
- National Office of Crackdown on Pornographic and Illegal Publications
  - Li Baozhong

=== Internal departmental structure ===
The agency is organised into the following departments:

- General Office
- Book Publishing Management Department
- Newspaper and Magazine Publishing Department
- Department for the Management of Audio and Video Products and Electronic Publications
- Department for the Management of Publication Distribution
- Department for the Management of Printing Industry
- Personnel and Education Department
- External Cooperation Department
- Copyright Management Department

The agency is the parent authority of the National Copyright Administration (Chinese: 国家版权局) which is responsible for copyright affairs in China.

== Area of responsibilities ==
The agency is in charge of regulating:

- New publishing houses – book, audio-visual, electronic publication, newspaper, and periodical offices
- General distribution offices – for publications (including books, newspapers, periodicals, audio and video products, and electronic publications
- Copyright agencies – audio and video production, electronic publication copying agencies and newspaper groups
- Agents – dealing with imported publications
- Foreign joint ventures in the news, print, and communications industry.

== See also ==
- Media of China
- Publishing in China
