= Xu Lin (politician, born 1963) =

Chinese politician

- 徐麟
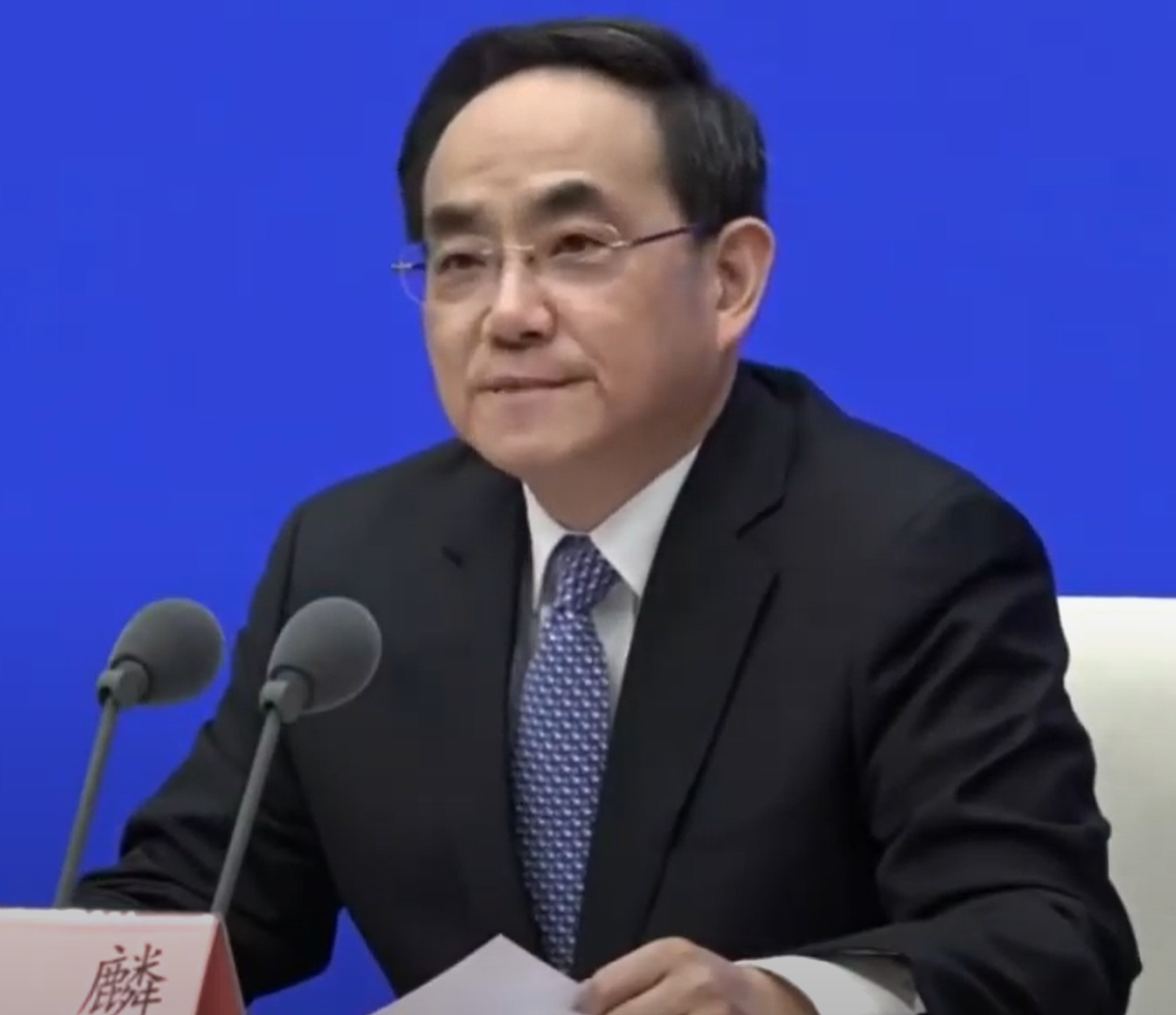
- Xu in June 2020

Party Secretary of Guizhou
- Incumbent
- Assumed office 9 December 2022
- Deputy: Li Bingjun (Governor)
- General Secretary: Xi Jinping
- Preceded by: Shen Yiqin

Chairman of the Standing Committee of the Guizhou Provincial People's Congress
- Incumbent
- Assumed office January 2023
- Preceded by: Shen Yiqin

Director of the National Radio and Television Administration
- In office 8 June 2022 – 3 February 2023
- Premier: Li Keqiang
- Preceded by: Nie Chenxi
- Succeeded by: Cao Shumin

Director of the State Council Information Office
- In office 21 August 2018 – 8 June 2022
- Premier: Li Keqiang
- Preceded by: Jiang Jianguo
- Succeeded by: Sun Yeli

Director of the Cyberspace Administration of China
- In office 19 July 2016 – 21 August 2018
- Premier: Li Keqiang
- Preceded by: Lu Wei
- Succeeded by: Zhuang Rongwen

Personal details
- Born: June 1963 (age 63) Shanghai, China
- Party: Chinese Communist Party
- Education: Shanghai Normal University

Xu Lin (Chinese: 徐麟; pinyin: Xú Lín; born June 1963) is a Chinese politician, who is currently serving as the Party secretary of Guizhou. Previously he served as director of the State Council Information Office and director of the National Radio and Television Administration. He also served as the main official in charge of internet policy, the head of the Cyberspace Administration of China, from June 2016 to July 2018. Xu was previously the head of the Shanghai Publicity Department and later Chinese Communist Party Committee Secretary of Pudong.

== Early life and education ==
Xu was born and raised in Shanghai. He was born in June 1963. He graduated from Shanghai Normal University and joined the CCP in September 1982.

== Career ==
=== Shanghai and Tibet ===
Xu began his career in 1982 as a teacher at Zhoupu Middle School in Nanhui County, where he was also secretary of the school's Communist Youth League branch. He then became deputy secretary and later secretary of the county Youth League committee and party secretary of Sandun Township. From 1990 to 1995, he headed the policy research office of the county party committee, and he became a member of the county party standing committee and deputy county magistrate. According to the Hong Kong Free Press, he was 29 when he joined the county standing committee and became acting deputy county chief.

In March 1995, Xu became deputy party secretary of Jiading District. From May 1995 to May 1998, he was posted to Tibet as deputy party secretary of Shigatse Prefecture, where he led Shanghai's first group of cadres sent to aid Tibet. In July 1998, he joined the Shanghai Agriculture, Industry and Commerce (Group) Corporation as deputy party secretary and vice chairman, and he later became its party secretary, chairman and general manager. In March 2003, he became party secretary and director of the Shanghai Civil Affairs Bureau, and he later headed the Shanghai Agriculture Commission.

In May 2007, two months after Xi Jinping became party secretary of Shanghai, Xu joined the standing committee of the Shanghai municipal party committee, his first post at deputy-ministerial level. Reuters reported that the two men worked together during Xi's brief tenure in Shanghai. From February 2008 to May 2013, Xu was party secretary of the Pudong New Area. From May 2013 to June 2015, he headed the propaganda department of the Shanghai party committee.

=== Internet regulator ===
In June 2015, Xu moved to Beijing as deputy director of the office of the Central Leading Group for Internet Security and Informatization and deputy director of the State Internet Information Office. In an article in the party journal Qiushi in October 2015, Xu pledged to uphold the party's leadership over the internet and the media "without any equivocation". On 29 June 2016, he succeeded Lu Wei as head of the Cyberspace Administration of China, while also serving as a deputy head of the party's Publicity Department. According to the Hong Kong Free Press, the 21st Century Business Herald described him as a "political star". After the leading group was turned into the Central Cyberspace Affairs Commission in 2018, Xu headed its office until July 2018, when Zhuang Rongwen succeeded him.

=== State Council Information Office and broadcasting ===
On 21 August 2018, the State Council appointed Xu director of the State Council Information Office, which releases official information and national policies, especially to foreign media. He succeeded Jiang Jianguo. Taiwan's Central News Agency reported that, according to media reports, Beijing planned to reshape its propaganda and internet leadership to improve China's international image. The political scientist Chen Daoyin suggested that Xu's pragmatic, Shanghai-style approach could moderate the confrontational tone of China's propaganda. As director, Xu chaired the press conference that released a white paper on China's response to COVID-19 in June 2020. At the China New Media Conference in Changsha in November 2020, Xu said that the convergence of China's media had entered a new stage, and that adhering to the correct political direction, guidance of public opinion and values was the soul of news work. The South China Morning Post reported that he also told the forum that China must "resolutely guard against digitalisation diluting the party's leadership" and "resolutely prevent the risk of capital manipulating public opinion". The Hong Kong outlet HK01 linked the warning to the suspension of Ant Group's stock listings and read it as aimed at internet companies, especially Alibaba, that had invested in the media. In December 2021, he presented a government report titled "Democracy that Works" at a press conference held shortly before the Summit for Democracy convened by United States President Joe Biden.

In June 2022, Xu became director and party secretary of the National Radio and Television Administration, his third ministerial-level post in the propaganda system since 2016. At his first public appearance in the post, he spoke about producing television programs on the stories of ordinary people ahead of the 20th Party Congress.

=== Guizhou ===
Xu meeting United States Ambassador to China R. Nicholas Burns in Guiyang (2024)

At the 20th Party Congress in October 2022, Xu was elected a full member of the Central Committee. On 9 December 2022, he was appointed party secretary of Guizhou, succeeding Shen Yiqin. The South China Morning Post described Guizhou as China's big data hub and Xu as a firm advocate and enforcer of Xi's vision for the media. On 17 January 2023, the first session of the 14th Guizhou Provincial People's Congress elected him chairman of its standing committee. On 3 February 2023, the State Council removed him as director of the National Radio and Television Administration, and the post remained vacant until Cao Shumin was appointed in May 2023.

Xu took charge of a province that Bloomberg described as one of the poorest and most indebted in China. In April 2023, as Guizhou sought state help to reduce its financial risks, the province signed a cooperation agreement with the state-owned distressed-asset manager China Cinda Asset Management. In May 2024, Xu presided over a provincial warning-education conference that told officials to learn lessons from the disciplinary and criminal cases of former Guizhou officials including Sun Zhigang, Li Zaiyong and Zhou Jiankun. In a March 2026 article published by Xinhua, Xu wrote that Guizhou's gross domestic product had grown from 1.83 trillion yuan in 2020 to 2.36 trillion yuan in 2025. He set out priorities that included the intensive development of mineral resources, digital and intelligent industries, rural revitalization and the promotion of grassroots sports events.

Government offices
Preceded by Shi Derong (施德荣)	Director of Shanghai Municipal Civil Affairs Bureau; 2003–2007	Succeeded by Wang Wei
Preceded by Yuan Yixing (袁以星)	Director of Shanghai Municipal Agricultural Commission; 2007–2008	Succeeded by Sun Lei (孙雷)
Preceded by Lu Wei	Director of the Cyberspace Administration of China; 2016–2018	Succeeded by Zhuang Rongwen
Preceded by Jiang Jianguo	Director of the State Council Information Office; 2018–2022	Succeeded by Sun Yeli
Preceded by Nie Chenxi	Director of the National Radio and Television Administration; 2022–2023	Succeeded by Cao Shumin
Party political offices
Preceded by Du Jiahao	Party Secretary of Pudong; 2008–2013	Succeeded by Shen Xiaoming
Preceded by Yang Zhenwu	Head of Publicity Department of Shanghai Municipal Committee of the Chinese Communist Party; 2013–2015	Succeeded by Dong Yunhu
Preceded by Lu Wei	Office of the Central Cyberspace Affairs Commission; 2016–2018	Succeeded by Zhuang Rongwen
Preceded by Shen Yiqin	Party Secretary of Guizhou; 2022–present	Incumbent
Assembly seats
Preceded by Shen Yiqin	Chairperson of Guizhou Provincial People's Congress; 2023–present	Incumbent
