= Operation Qinglang =

Censorship campaign of the People's Republic of China

Operation Qinglang (Chinese: 清朗行动; pinyin: Qīnglǎng Xíngdòng; lit. "Operation Clearing") is an Internet campaign undertaken annually by the Cyberspace Administration of China (CAC). First launched in 2016, the campaign has become annual since 2020. It mainly consists of cracking down on the use of the Internet to spread information suspected of violating Chinese laws. The key targets of the campaign vary from year to year. Various places in China have also launched corresponding measures to respond to the national Qinglang campaign.

== Major campaigns ==
=== 2016 ===
The content for the 2016 campaign included the "centralized rectification of apps involving children and teenagers", the "special governance of website navigation websites", the "special campaign to combat the spread of illegal and irregular information through cloud storage", the "special rectification of illegal WeChat public accounts", and the "special rectification of travel websites". On November 25, the Cyberspace Administration of China published a document titled "The Cyberspace Administration of China Leads the 'Qinglang' Series of Special Actions in 2016 to Target Internet Problems and Form a Continuous Deterrent." The document said that during this action, a total of 1.045 million accounts and 1.29 million spaces and groups that spread obscene, pornographic, violent, and bloody information were shut down, and more than 17,000 criminal suspects were arrested.

=== 2017 to 2019 ===
Some local government network supervision departments used "Qinglang" as a code name to carry out Internet governance actions. In 2019, Hebei launched the "Qinglang·Yanzhao Net Cleaning 2019" campaign. During this period, the CAC also carried out internet governance actions. For example, starting in January 2019, the CAC launched a campaign for network ecology governance, which lasted for six months.

=== 2020 ===
In May 2020, the phenomenon of minors becoming online anchors, such as the case of Zhong Meimei, a boy from Hegang, Heilongjiang, who became famous for imitating his teacher, continued to generate heated public debate. On May 22, 2020, the Cyberspace Administration of China issued a notice entitled "The Cyberspace Administration of China Launches the 2020 Operation Qinglang", stating that the action would last for eight months starting from May 22. The notice indicated that the "Qinglang" campaign in 2020 would focus on rectifying online content such as pornography, vulgarity, cyberbullying, malicious marketing, and infringement of citizens' personal privacy.

On July 13, the CAC issued the "Notice on Carrying Out the 2020 'Qinglang' Special Rectification of the Online Environment for Minors During the Summer Vacation", which proposed to rectify seven aspects of issues related to the growth of minors, including online learning sections, bad animation and comics, live streaming, short video website platform information, group chat forums, malicious pop-ups, bottomless idol worship, fan circle infighting, and game recharge. Specifically, it included rectifying content such as Blue Whale Challenge, "Death Suffocation", and Doki Doki Literature Club!. As of October, a total of 13,942 illegal websites and more than 5.78 million illegal and irregular accounts were shut down.

=== 2021 ===
In 2021, several controversial incidents involving the entertainment industry occurred, including the milk dumping incident for the contestants of Youth With You, the surrogacy and abandonment scandal of Zheng Shuang, the Kris Wu rape case, the old photo scandal of Zhang Zhehan, the banning incident of Zhao Liying's fan circle chaos, and the mutual attacks between fan groups on the Internet. Therefore, the rectification of the "chaos" in the Chinese entertainment industry is considered by the media and public opinion to be the focus of this action.

On May 8, 2021, the State Council Information Office held a press conference to introduce the 2021 Qinglang campaign, stating that the 2021 actions were divided into eight special actions:

- "Clean Up the Internet and Combat Historical Nihilism": This initiative aims to eliminate information that distorts the history of the Chinese Communist Party, the nation, and the military, and promotes historical nihilism, creating a positive online environment for the 100th anniversary of the Chinese Communist Party.
- "Clean and Bright Online Environment for the Spring Festival": Rectifying harmful information on homepages and push notifications from lifestyle service platforms;
- "Clean and Clear: Governance of Algorithm Abuse": Regulating the behavior and order of using recommendation algorithms for the segmented dissemination of news information;
- "Clean Up the Internet: Combating Online Trolls, Traffic Fraud, and Black PR": Cleaning up online trolls, and so on.
- "Clean and Bright Online Environment for Minors": A concentrated effort to address harmful information that affects the physical and mental health of teenagers and hinders their online learning.
- "Clean and Bright: Rectifying Prominent Issues with Push Notifications": This includes addressing issues such as mobile app push notifications recommending illegal "self-media" information.
- "Clean and Standardized Website Account Operations": This initiative aims to rectify illegal registration and authentication practices, as well as the impersonation of Party and government organs, media outlets, institutions, and celebrities. A number of illegal and non-compliant accounts would be shut down. The initiative also addresses malicious marketing practices such as exploiting current political events, clickbait headlines, sexually suggestive content, and large-scale plagiarism.
- "Clean Up the Internet and Rectify the Chaos in Online Entertainment and Hot Topics Rankings": Regulate the online behavior of celebrities and their affiliated organizations and official fan groups, and crack down on fan support activities, and so on.

CAC deputy director Sheng Ronghua said that Operation Qinglang aimed to align with Chinese Communist Party (CCP) General Secretary Xi Jinping's vision of cyberspace as "the common spiritual home of hundreds of millions of people" and follow his directive that if "Cyberspace has a clear sky and a good ecology it is in the interests of the people, but if cyberspace is smoggy and ecologically deteriorating, this is not in the interests of the people".

==== Official actions ====
===== Fan circle crackdown =====
On June 15, the CAC launched the "Qinglang·Crackdown on Fan Circle Chaos" special campaign. By early August, the campaign had cleaned up more than 150,000 pieces of illegal information, dealt with more than 4,000 accounts, and closed more than 1,300 groups. On August 23, several official Weibo accounts of Zhao Liying's fan group were banned, becoming the first fan group to be banned on a large scale for "mutual tearing" since the "Qinglang" campaign began. On August 24, Zhao Liying's studio was banned from Weibo for 15 days due to mismanagement, becoming the first person in the platform's history to be punished in this way. On August 27, the CAC issued a notice on further strengthening the governance of the chaos in the "fan circle," requiring the rectification of the chaos in the "fan circle" and the cancellation of the "celebrity artist rankings". Subsequently, Sina Weibo carried out rectification work such as "requiring name changes" and banning thousands of fan organization accounts. At the end of September, the "Douban Goose Group" was suspended for two months for rectification.

On September 2, the General Office of the National Radio and Television Administration issued the "Notice on Further Strengthening the Management of Cultural and Artistic Programs and Their Personnel", which proposed eight measures, including "resolutely resisting illegal and immoral personnel", and explicitly stated that idol development programs, celebrity children's reality shows and other programs should not be broadcast. On the same day, the Publicity Department of the CCP Central Committee issued the "Notice on Carrying Out Comprehensive Governance Work in the Cultural and Entertainment Field". The department head accepted an interview with reporters and asked questions, stating that industry management should be further strengthened and management measures for actor brokerage agencies, online performance brokerage agencies, etc. should be studied and formulated.

On September 7, the State Administration of Radio and Television held a "symposium for radio, television and online audiovisual literary and artistic workers", requiring literary and artistic practitioners to "always regard loving the Party and loving the country as their duty and responsibility". On September 10, local radio and television stations, the China Association of Performing Arts, and 14 online platforms held a meeting and released relevant measures: KuGou, Sina Weibo, IQIYI, Tencent Video, Youku, Bilibili, Migu Video, Toutiao, Douyin, Kuaishou, QQ Music, Kuwo Music, Migu Music, and Xiaohongshu jointly released the "Construction a Clean and Healthy Online Cultural Ecosystem Self-Discipline Convention". On November 23, the CAC issued the "Notice on Further Strengthening the Regulation of Online Information of Entertainment Stars", which strictly controls the content of online information of entertainment stars and establishes a negative list to prohibit online rumors, malicious traffic boosting, false information and other activities of entertainment stars.

===== Other actions =====
On February 4, the CAC launched the 2021 "Clean and Bright Online Environment for Spring Festival" special campaign. By the end of March, the "Clean and Bright Online Environment for Spring Festival" campaign had banned more than 7,200 illegal live streamers and dealt with more than 70,000 accounts. In May, Xiaohongshu began removing content related to flaunting wealth and excessive eating and drinking from its platform in accordance with the 2021 Clean-up Campaign. On July 21, the CAC launched the "Clean and Bright Summer Online Environment Rectification Campaign for Minors", explicitly prohibiting minors under the age of 16 from appearing on camera and engaging in live streaming and other similar behaviors. On August 27, the CAC launched a special campaign to clean up commercial websites and self-media platforms that illegally collect, edit, and publish financial information. By early September, more than 3,000 accounts, ranging from commercial websites to self-media, had been dealt with. On August 27, the CAC launched a special campaign to address prominent issues related to push notifications in mobile applications.

On September 1, the "Notice on Further Strengthening Management and Effectively Preventing Minors from Becoming Addicted to Online Games" was implemented, which further strengthened management measures in response to the problem of minors overusing or even becoming addicted to online games. On September 8, relevant officials from the Publicity Department of the CCP Central Committee and the National Radio and Television Administration, together with the Cyberspace Administration of China, the Ministry of Culture and Tourism and other departments, held talks with key online game companies such as Tencent and NetEase, as well as game account rental and sales platforms and game live streaming platforms. On October 29, the Publicity Department of the CCP Central Committee and the National Radio and Television Administration held talks with the Shanghai, Jiangsu, Zhejiang and Hunan Broadcasting and Television Stations regarding the problem of "excessive entertainment" in satellite TV programs. On November 19, the first China Internet Civilization Conference opened in Beijing in the morning.

===== Public reactions =====
At the end of August, more than 100 Chinese celebrities issued a statement advocating rational idol worship and expressing their support for Operation Qinglang. On September 6, the China Youth New Media Association issued an initiative on responding to the call of the Chinese government to create a clean and healthy cyberspace.

According to media reports in September, some South Korean media commentators expressed concern that this action would affect cultural exchanges between China and South Korea, and believed that the relevant measures taken by China were aimed at South Korea. The Chinese embassy in South Korea issued a statement saying that the campaign does not target South Korean cultural products, saying the target is "fandoms" using "abusive language, slander and malicious marketing" and is "in no way meant to influence China's relations with other countries". Some agents and young actors in the entertainment industry said that Operation Qinglang could allow cultural and entertainment products to return to the essence of artistic works and would give more opportunities to actors who do not have "high traffic" but have strength.

=== 2022 ===
On March 17, 2022, the State Council Information Office of China held a press conference on the 2022 Qinglang campaign, announcing that this year's Operation Qinglang included 10 key tasks:

- "Clean Up the Internet and Combat Chaos in the Online Live Streaming and Short Video Sectors" Special Campaign
- "Clean Up the Information Content of MCN Agencies" Special Campaign
- "Clean Internet and Combat Online Rumors" Special Campaign
- "Clean and Bright Online Environment for Minors - 2022 Summer Campaign"
- "Clean Up the Internet: Rectifying the Chaos in Application Information Services" Special Campaign
- "Clean and Regulated Online Communication Order" Special Campaign
- "Qinglang·2022 Comprehensive Governance of Algorithms" Special Campaign
- "Clean and Bright Online Environment Rectification Campaign for the 2022 Spring Festival"
- "Clean Internet: Combating Traffic Fraud, Black PR, and Online Trolls" Special Campaign
- "Clean Internet User Account Operation Special Rectification Campaign"

In January 2022, the CAC announced that it had interviewed 8,608 websites for potential violations, warned 6,767 websites, fined 512 websites, suspended or subsequently updated 621 websites, and removed 420 programs from app stores. On 28 March 2023, at a press conference held by the SCIO, a CAC official announced that the CAC carried out 13 "Qinglang" special actions in 2022, "cleaning up more than 54.3 million pieces of illegal and harmful information, disposing of more than 6.8 million accounts, removing more than 2,890 apps and mini-programs, disbanding and closing 260,000 groups and forums, and shutting down more than 7,300 websites".

=== 2023 ===
On January 18, 2023, the Cyberspace Administration of China decided to launch a one-month special campaign to "clean up the network environment during the Spring Festival of 2023". The Cyberspace Administration of China stated that the campaign mainly targets "fan circles", online flaunting of wealth and binge eating, online gambling and online fraud, feudal superstition and bad phenomena, online bullying and internet addiction, false information and the rendering of dark emotions. Among them, the CAC specifically emphasized "strictly controlling the problem of deliberately inciting regional attacks, spreading anxiety and rendering the dark side of society by publishing false information such as returning home notes and returning home experiences".

On March 28, 2023, Shen Yue, director of the China Internet Illegal Information Reporting Center, said that the CAC was preparing to launch a special campaign called "Qinglang·Optimizing the Business Network Environment and Protecting the Legitimate Rights and Interests of Enterprises" to safeguard the legitimate rights and interests of enterprises and entrepreneurs on the Internet and severely crack down on behaviors that maliciously damage the image and reputation of enterprises and entrepreneurs online. Niu Yibing, deputy director of the CAC, said that the Qinglang series of special campaigns in 2023 would focus on rectifying the chaos of self-media. The Qinglang series of special campaigns in 2023 would take "promoting the formation of a good network ecology" as the working goal and focus on nine new situations, new problems and difficult bottlenecks. Specifically, it includes: strictly rectifying the chaos of "self-media"; cracking down on the manipulation of information content by online water armies; standardizing the network dissemination order of key traffic links; optimizing the business network environment and protecting the legitimate rights and interests of enterprises; rectifying the information content of life service platforms; rectifying the problem of bad orientation of short video information content; rectifying the network environment for minors during the summer vacation of 2023; rectifying the network violence; rectifying the network environment during the Spring Festival of 2023.

On April 28, 2023, the CAC issued a notice on launching a special campaign to "clean up the network environment for business and protect the legitimate rights and interests of enterprises". The CAC stated that the purpose of this campaign was to "thoroughly clean up and deal with false and infringing information involving enterprises and entrepreneurs, resolutely crack down on malicious hype, investigate and punish websites, platforms and accounts that infringe on the legitimate rights and interests of enterprises and entrepreneurs, and create a good network public opinion atmosphere for enterprises to concentrate on their work and develop without distraction. It said the campaign would focus on addressing the use of counterfeit and imitation of other companies' names, registered trademarks, and brands, to open websites, register accounts, and launch APPs and mini-programs; and maliciously spread so-called "private enterprises selling out the country", "private enterprises leaving the market", "state advancing and private retreating" arguments by means of "labeling", "leading the rhythm", and "magnifying glass", and exaggerate and incite resistance to the state-owned economy and private enterprises, ten types of network chaos".

On 12 December 2023, the CAC state that it would target short videos that include "misleading content" about people's lives or promoted incorrect values such as pessimism or extremism, as well as "extravagance and money worship". The CAC also said it would target fake videos generated using artificial intelligence. It said the campaign would improve public mental health, and create a healthy space for competition for the short video industry to develop.

=== 2024 ===
On March 15, 2024, the Cyberspace Administration of China launched the 2024 Qinglang campaign, which were mainly divided into 10 special actions:

- "Clean and Bright Online Environment Rectification for the 2024 Spring Festival": Focusing on rectifying misleading travel guides, self-directed and self-acted bizarre videos; inciting group antagonism; fabricating false stories about returning home; illegally diverting information; flaunting wealth and worshipping celebrities without limits; and harming the physical and mental health of minors, so as to create a positive and healthy online atmosphere for the Spring Festival.
- "Clean and Bright Online Business Environment": Focusing on cracking down on behaviors such as spreading false information about enterprises, spreading rumors and smearing enterprises, and extortion under the guise of public opinion supervision.
- "Clean Up the Internet and Combat Illegal External Links": Rectify the use of coded language to publish illegal external links for pornography, gambling, etc., strengthen the identification of graphic and symbolic traffic diversion, carry out cross-platform joint investigations of black and gray industries, and transfer clues of illegal and criminal activities.
- "Clean Up the Internet and Rectify the Unscrupulous Pursuit of Traffic by 'Self-Media'": Rectify the behavior of creating and exploiting trending topics to create information traps, standardize the labeling of current affairs information and the identification of AI-generated content, strictly review the profit-making rights, and optimize the distribution mechanism of high-quality content.
- "Clean Up the Internet Live Streaming Chaos Rectification": The campaign focuses on rectifying seven prominent issues, including fake "playing poor and pitiful" sales promotions, fabricated matchmaking hype, dissemination of soft pornography, vulgar live streams late at night, tasteless PK behaviors, and false science popularization information.
- "Clean and Standardized Labeling of Generative AI": Implement regulations for the management of generative AI, clean up unlabeled synthetic content, and deal with illegal accounts that use generative technology to spread rumors and engage in marketing.
- "Qinglang·2024 Summer Internet Protection for Minors": Rectify pop-up ads on the homepage that contain inappropriate content for minors, crack down on disguised vulgar derivative works, cyberbullying, remote molestation and other behaviors, strictly regulate the content of children's smart devices, and prevent internet addiction.
- "Clean and Standardized Use of Online Language": Rectify the misuse of misspelled words and homophones to spread harmful information, optimize the platform's misspelling prompt function, and streamline reporting channels to handle non-standard language.
- "Clean Up the Internet and Rectify Illegal Internet News Services": Strictly investigate unlicensed and over-scope news services, resale of news licenses, and the publication of false news; strengthen the qualification review of "news" accounts; and deal with violators.
- "Clean and Clear Local Information Rectification": Focusing on rectifying common local problems such as vulgar marketing, online trolls, rumors and false information, optimizing the geolocation recommendation mechanism, and preventing the clustering of illegal information.

On April 21, the Cyberspace Administration of China issued a notice on launching a special campaign to "clean up the internet and rectify the bottomless pursuit of traffic by self-media", announcing that it would crack down on internet celebrity accounts that deliberately flaunt their wealth. Subsequently, multiple internet platforms issued announcements on cracking down on the promotion of flaunting wealth. On the evening of May 21, the internet celebrity account Wang Hongquanxing was banned by various platforms. Internet celebrity accounts such as Bai Gongzi and Baoyu Jiajie were also banned.

On October 11, China Central Television released a message stating that the CAC and the Ministry of Education had issued a notice to deploy a special campaign to "clean up and standardize the use of online language and writing". The campaign focusED on the non-standard and uncivilized language and writing phenomena presented by some websites and platforms in key areas such as hot search lists, homepage first screens, and discovery selections. The campaign focused on rectifying prominent problems such as distorting sound, form, and meaning, fabricating online slang and jokes, and abusing obscure expressions.

=== 2025 ===
On February 21, 2025, the Cyberspace Administration of China released the key points of the "Qinglang" campaign in 2025, which are mainly divided into eight aspects: "rectifying the online environment during the Spring Festival, rectifying the release of false information by "self-media", rectifying malicious marketing in the short video field, rectifying the chaos of AI technology abuse, rectifying online "black mouths" involving enterprises, rectifying the online environment for minors during the summer vacation, rectifying the chaos of online live streaming rewards, and rectifying the malicious provocation of negative emotions".

On September 22, 2025, the CAC launched a two-month special campaign called "Qinglang: Rectifying the Problem of Malicious Provocation of Negative Emotions," which mainly focused on and controlled phenomena such as "inciting extreme antagonism among groups," "spreading panic and anxiety," "stirring up cyber violence," and "excessively exaggerating negative and pessimistic emotions."
