= The Mind and Spirit of Cyberspace Security =

Chinese patriotic song about the Internet

The Mind and Spirit of Cyberspace Security (Chinese: 网信精神; pinyin: Wǎng xìn jīngshén) is a Chinese patriotic song and the de-facto anthem of the Cyberspace Administration of China.

It was written by Wang Pingjiu, who was previously responsible for writing the lyrics for the introductory chorus to the 2008 Beijing Summer Olympic Games. It was first recorded in early 2015 during lunar new year celebrations from the Beijing Internet Association. The New York Times' report suggested that the Chinese authorities may have had second thoughts about the wisdom of releasing the tune to the wider world, and thus appear to have censored it.

== Lyrics ==
The first stanza begins referring to the Cyberspace Administration's employees watching over the Internet, serving their mission "as the sun rises in the east", which is followed by espousing the brightness of innovation, which according to the lyrics, is like "a beam of integrity that moves through your heart". The first stanza concludes by stating the Internet unites all living things, and that china is contributing to it, evolving it into "its most beautiful form".

The chorus praises China as "an Internet power" - citing that where the Internet exists, there are hopes and dreams; and that the Internet tells the world that "the Chinese Dream is lifting up China"; and that each individual represents their country.

The second stanza states that, as all rivers search for the sea (presumably referring to the spread of information on the Internet), they carry Chinese culture and "measure China's greatness". It also mentions the five thousand years of history that are condensed to highlight innovation, and that integrity comes only from a "clean and pure nation". It also states that they are united, and their faith and devotion flow as far as the Yellow River and the Yangtze River. After this, the chorus is repeated twice.

== See also ==
- Internet censorship in China
