= Bingjun =

Bingjun could refer to:

- Li Bingjun (Chinese: 李炳军), Chinese politician
- Zhao Bingjun (Chinese: 赵秉钧), Qing dynasty and Republic of China politician
