= Nie Chenxi =

Chinese politician

- 聂辰席
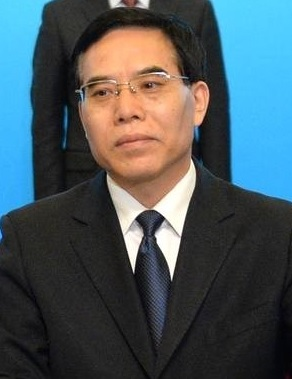
- Nie Chenxi

Director of the National Radio and Television Administration
- In office 21 March 2018 – 9 June 2022
- Preceded by: Cai Fuchao
- Succeeded by: Xu Lin

Deputy Head of the Publicity Department of the Chinese Communist Party
- In office 29 September 2016 – 9 June 2022
- Leader: Huang Kunming (head)

President of the China Central Television
- In office 2015–2018
- Preceded by: Hu Zhanfan
- Succeeded by: Shen Haixiong

Vice Governor of Hebei
- In office 2011–2012
- Governor: Niu Maosheng

Personal details
- Born: July 1957 (age 69) Lingshou County, Hebei, China
- Party: Chinese Communist Party
- Education: Fudan University; University of Science and Technology of China; Nanyang Technological University; Central Party School of the Chinese Communist Party; Tianjin University; Renmin University of China

Chinese name
- Traditional Chinese: 聶辰席
- Simplified Chinese: 聂辰席
Transcriptions
Standard Mandarin
- Hanyu Pinyin: Niè Chénxí

Nie Chenxi (Chinese: 聂辰席; born July 1957) is a Chinese politician who served as director and Party branch secretary of National Radio and Television Administration from 2018 to 2022 and deputy head of Publicity Department of the Chinese Communist Party. He served as a member of the 19th Central Committee of the Chinese Communist Party.

== Biography ==
=== Hebei ===
Nie was born in Lingshou County, Hebei, in July 1957. Nie studied at the Department of Computer Science, Fudan University, majoring in programming in 1977. 1980, he was appointed as a cadre, chief clerk, and engineer of the Computing Center of the Bureau of Statistics of Hebei Province, and was appointed as a chief clerk, engineer, and vice-director of the Department of Databases and Programs in the Hebei Provincial Economic Information Center in 1987. In 1992, he became a chief clerk of the Comprehensive Division of the Research Office of the Hebei Provincial People's Government (Economic Research Center) and deputy director of the Information and Data Division, and joined the Chinese Communist Party (CCP) in February 1993. In 1995, he became the director of the Education and Scientific Research Division of the Research Office of the Hebei Provincial People's Government (Economic Research Center), and in 1997 he became the deputy director of the Research Office of the Hebei Provincial People's Government (Economic Research Center).

In 1999, he was appointed as a member of the Standing Committee of the CCP Handan Municipal Committee and Minister of the Organization Department. 2001, he was appointed as Deputy Secretary of the CCP Handan Municipal Committee and Secretary of the Municipal Commission for Discipline Inspection. 2003, he was appointed as Deputy Secretary of the CCP Handan Municipal Committee and Mayor of the CCP Handan Municipal Committee. 2004, he was appointed as Secretary of the CCP Handan Municipal Committee. In 2006, he was appointed as a member of the Standing Committee of the CCP Hebei Provincial Committee, Minister of the Publicity Department. 2007-2011, he was appointed as Chairman of the Hebei Federation of Social Sciences. From 2007 to 2011, he was also the Chairman of the Hebei Federation of Social Sciences, and in November 2011, he became a member of the Standing Committee of the CCP Hebei Provincial Committee.

=== Beijing ===
In October 2012, he became deputy secretary of the party group and deputy director of the State Administration of Radio, Film and Television. After the State Council's institutional reform in March 2013, he was reappointed as deputy secretary of the party group and deputy director of the newly established State Administration of Press, Publication, Radio, Film and Television. Since April 2015, he has also served as the chairman of the China Central Television (CCTV). In September 2016, he succeeded Cai Fuchao as deputy head of the Publicity Department of the Central Committee of the Chinese Communist Party. On June 9, 2022, he ceased to hold the position of Director National Radio and Television Administration. On June 22, 2022, he was added as a member of the 13th National Committee of the Chinese People's Political Consultative Conference (CPPCC) and deputy director of the Committee of Culture, Literature, History and Study of the CPPCC. In March 2023, Nie Chenxi was elected as a member of the Standing Committee of the 14th National Committee of the Chinese People's Political Consultative Conference, and deputy director of the Committee of Culture, Literature, History and Study of the CPPCC.

Government offices
| Preceded by Zhang Li | Mayor of Handan; 2003–2004 | Succeeded by Sun Ruibin |
| Preceded by Hu Zhanfan (胡占凡) | President of China Central Television; 2015–2018 | Succeeded by Shen Haixiong |
| Preceded by Cai Fuchao | Director of National Radio and Television Administration; 2016- June 2022 | Succeeded by Xu Lin |
Party political offices
| Preceded by Zhao Yong | Head of the Publicity Department of the CCP Hebei Committee; 2011–2015 | Succeeded by Ai Wenli |
| Preceded by Zhang Li | Communist Party Secretary of Handan; 2004–2006 | Succeeded by Sun Ruibin |
