= National Computer Network Emergency Response Technical Team/Coordination Center of China =

Chinese government body

- 国家计算机网络与信息安全管理中心
- Abbreviation: CNCERT/CC
- Formation: September 2002; 23 years ago
- Headquarters: 3 Yumin Road, Chaoyang, Beijing
- Director: Li Xiangning
- Parent organization: Cyberspace Administration of China
- Website: www.cert.org.cn

National Computer Network Emergency Response Technical Team/Coordination Center of China
- Simplified Chinese: 国家计算机网络与信息安全管理中心
- Traditional Chinese: 國家電腦網路與資訊安全管理中心
Transcriptions
Standard Mandarin
- Hanyu Pinyin: Guójiā Hìsuànjī Wǎngluò yǔ Xìnxī Ānquán Guǎnlǐ Zhōngxīn

Alternative Chinese name
- Simplified Chinese: 国家计算机网络应急技术处理协调中心
- Traditional Chinese: 國家電腦網路緊急技術處理協調中心
Transcriptions
Standard Mandarin
- Hanyu Pinyin: Guójiā Jìsuànjī Wǎngluò Yìngjí Jìshù Chǔlǐ Xiétiáo Zhōngxīn

The National Computer Network Emergency Response Technical Team/Coordination Center of China (CNCERT/CC) is the core coordination organization of the cybersecurity emergency response system of the People's Republic of China.

== History ==
In September 1999, the National Computer Network and Information Security Management Center was established. In 2000, the Computer Network and Information Security Management Office of the National Informatization Leading Group held a working meeting on the establishment of a national public Internet security incident emergency response system and proposed that the center be responsible for the core tasks. In October 2000, the Ministry of Information Industry established the Computer Network Emergency Response Coordination Center. In August 2001, the National Computer Network and Information Security Management Center formally established the China Computer Network Emergency Response Coordination Center. In September 2002, the coordination center was formally established.

On July 14, 2003, the Organization Department of the Chinese Communist Party officially approved the establishment of the National Computer Network Emergency Response Technical Coordination Center, and added "transnational network security incident handling" to its business. The China Computer Network Emergency Response Coordination Center was named the National Computer Network Emergency Response Technical Coordination Center. The National Computer Network and Information Security Management Center (National Computer Network Emergency Response Technical Coordination Center) was initially affiliated with the Ministry of Information Industry. In March 2003, the Ministry of Information Industry approved the renaming of the "National Computer Network and Information Security Management Center Internet Emergency Response Team Coordination Office" established in September 1999 to the "Ministry of Information Industry Internet Emergency Response Coordination Office", which directly led the center's business.

In March 2008, during the institutional reform of the State Council, the center was transferred to the newly established Ministry of Industry and Information Technology and became a directly affiliated institution of the Ministry of Industry and Information Technology, headed by a vice minister. On September 29, 2009, the Ministry of Industry and Information Technology issued the "Public Internet Network Security Emergency Plan". According to the provisions of the Plan, on August 18, 2010, the Internet Network Security Emergency Response Expert Group of the Ministry of Industry and Information Technology was established in Beijing. A total of 20 members of the expert group from the National Computer Network Emergency Response Technical Processing Coordination Center, the Ministry of Industry and Information Technology's Telecommunication Research Institute, the China Internet Network Information Center, the National Information Technology Security Research Center, the China Information Security Evaluation Center, basic telecommunications operators, communication equipment manufacturers and security vendors attended the establishment ceremony. On April 20, 2015, according to the " Notice of the Central Organization Department on the Adjustment of Responsibilities and Institutions of the Ministry of Industry and Information Technology", the Ministry of Industry and Information Technology transferred the responsibilities of informatization promotion and network information security coordination to the Office of the Central Leading Group for Cyberspace Security and Informatization (CAC), but the center is still under the management of the Ministry of Industry and Information Technology.

On November 14, 2017, the Ministry of Industry and Information Technology issued the "Emergency Plan for Public Internet Network Security Emergencies" with Ministry of Industry and Information Technology Network Security, which stipulates that "under the overall coordination of the Central Cyberspace Affairs Office, the Ministry of Industry and Information Technology's Cybersecurity and Informatization Leading Group (hereinafter referred to as the Ministry Leading Group) will uniformly lead the emergency management of public Internet network security emergencies and be responsible for the unified command and coordination of particularly serious public Internet network security emergencies." "Under the overall coordination of the National Cybersecurity Emergency Office under the Central Cyberspace Affairs Office and under the unified leadership of the Ministry Leading Group, the Ministry of Industry and Information Technology's Cybersecurity Emergency Office (hereinafter referred to as the Ministry Emergency Office) is responsible for public Internet network security. The Ministry of Industry and Information Technology is responsible for the overall emergency management work; promptly reporting the emergency situation to the Ministry's leadership group, proposing measures to deal with particularly serious cybersecurity emergencies; responsible for the unified command and coordination of major cybersecurity emergencies; and coordinating the response to major and general cybersecurity emergencies as needed. The specific work of the Ministry's Emergency Response Office is undertaken by the Cybersecurity Administration of the Ministry of Industry and Information Technology. "The National Computer Network Emergency Response Technical Processing Coordination Center, China Academy of Information and Communications Technology, China Software Testing Center, and National Industrial Information Security Development Research Center (hereinafter collectively referred to as cybersecurity professional institutions) are responsible for monitoring and reporting public Internet cybersecurity emergencies and early warning information, and providing decision-making support and technical support for emergency work."

In March 2018, the Central Committee of the Chinese Communist Party issued the "Plan for Deepening the Reform of Party and State Institutions", stating that "(16) Optimize the responsibilities of the Office of the Central Cyberspace Security and Informatization Commission. In order to safeguard the national cyberspace security and interests, the National Computer Network and Information Security Management Center will be transferred from the Ministry of Industry and Information Technology to the Office of the Central Cyberspace Security and Informatization Commission." "The Ministry of Industry and Information Technology will continue to be responsible for coordinating the construction of telecommunications networks, the Internet, and dedicated communication networks, organizing and guiding technological innovation and technological progress in the communications industry, and providing support for the infrastructure construction and technological innovation of the National Computer Network and Information Security Management Center. The management system, main responsibilities, and staffing of the Communications Administration Bureaus established in various provinces (autonomous regions, and municipalities directly under the central government) will remain unchanged."

On September 22, 2021, the Office of the Central Cyberspace Affairs Commission announced the proposed commendations for the National Cyberspace Advanced Collectives and Individuals. A department of the National Computer Network and Information Security Management Center was selected into the public list of the National Cyberspace Advanced Collectives, and Zhang Yong, an engineer at the Guizhou Branch of the National Computer Network and Information Security Management Center, was selected into the public list of the National Cyberspace Advanced Individuals.

== Functions ==
The center is a non-governmental, non-profit cybersecurity technology center and the core coordination organization of the People's Republic of China's cybersecurity emergency response system. It is responsible for the prevention, discovery, early warning, and coordination of Internet cybersecurity incidents throughout the country. The center is a full member of the cybersecurity cooperation organization FIRST and one of the initiators of the Asia-Pacific Emergency Response Team APCERT. As of 2017, the center has established "CNCERT International Partner" relationships with 211 organizations in 72 countries and regions.

The main responsibilities of the National Computer Network Emergency Response Technical Coordination Center are: as a national emergency center, "in accordance with the principle of 'active prevention, timely discovery, rapid response, and guaranteed recovery', to carry out the prevention, discovery, early warning and coordinated disposal of Internet network security incidents, maintain national public Internet security, ensure the safe operation of basic information networks and important information systems, and carry out relevant security monitoring work for the 'Internet +' integrated industry represented by Internet finance." CNCERT responsible for developing tools to support to support the Great Firewall.

== Structure ==
The National Computer Network and Information Security Management Center has branches in many locations:

- National Computer Network and Information Security Management Center Shanghai Branch: Established on January 19, 2001
- National Computer Network and Information Security Management Center Guangdong Branch (formerly known as Guangzhou Branch): established on July 24, 2001
- Hubei Branch of National Computer Network and Information Security Management Center: established on December 17, 2001
- National Computer Network and Information Security Management Center Xinjiang Branch: established on February 1, 2002
- National Computer Network and Information Security Management Center Guizhou Branch: Established on February 25, 2002
- Guangxi Branch of National Computer Network and Information Security Management Center: Established on March 20, 2002
- Henan Branch of National Computer Network and Information Security Management Center: Established on March 20, 2002
- Fujian Branch of National Computer Network and Information Security Management Center: Established on March 20, 2002
- Hebei Branch of National Computer Network and Information Security Management Center: Established on March 20, 2002
- National Computer Network and Information Security Management Center Jilin Branch: Established on March 20, 2002
- Heilongjiang Branch of National Computer Network and Information Security Management Center
- Liaoning Branch of National Computer Network and Information Security Management Center
- National Computer Network and Information Security Management Center Beijing Branch
- National Computer Network and Information Security Management Center Tianjin Branch
- National Computer Network and Information Security Management Center Inner Mongolia Branch
- National Computer Network and Information Security Management Center Shanxi Branch
- National Computer Network and Information Security Management Center Zhejiang Branch
- Anhui Branch of National Computer Network and Information Security Management Center
- Jiangsu Branch of National Computer Network and Information Security Management Center
- National Computer Network and Information Security Management Center Shandong Branch
- National Computer Network and Information Security Management Center Jiangxi Branch
- Hainan Branch of National Computer Network and Information Security Management Center
- Sichuan Branch of National Computer Network and Information Security Management Center
- National Computer Network and Information Security Management Center Chongqing Branch
- Yunnan Branch of National Computer Network and Information Security Management Center
- National Computer Network and Information Security Management Center Tibet Branch
- Qinghai Branch of National Computer Network and Information Security Management Center
- Gansu Branch of National Computer Network and Information Security Management Center
- National Computer Network and Information Security Management Center Shaanxi Branch
- Hunan Branch of National Computer Network and Information Security Management Center

The National Computer Network Emergency Response Technical Coordination Center has 31 branches in provinces, autonomous regions, and municipalities directly under the central government:

- National Computer Network Emergency Response Technical Coordination Center Shanghai Branch: Established on September 20, 2005
- National Computer Network Emergency Response Technical Coordination Center Shanxi Branch: Established on June 28, 2005
- National Computer Network Emergency Response Technical Coordination Center Dalian Branch: Established in August 2011
- Heilongjiang Branch of National Computer Network Emergency Response Technical Coordination Center
- Jilin Branch of National Computer Network Emergency Response Technical Coordination Center
- Liaoning Branch of National Computer Network Emergency Response Technical * Coordination Center
- National Computer Network Emergency Response Technical Coordination Center Beijing Branch
- National Computer Network Emergency Response Technical Processing Coordination Center Tianjin Branch
- Hebei Branch of National Computer Network Emergency Response Technical Processing Coordination Center
- Inner Mongolia Branch of National Computer Network Emergency Response Technical Processing Coordination Center
- National Computer Network Emergency Response Technical Coordination Center Zhejiang Branch
- Anhui Branch of National Computer Network Emergency Response Technical Coordination Center
- Jiangsu Branch of National Computer Network Emergency Response Technical Coordination Center
- National Computer Network Emergency Response Technical Processing Coordination Center Shandong Branch
- National Computer Network Emergency Response Technical Processing Coordination Center Jiangxi Branch
- Fujian Branch of National Computer Network Emergency Response Technical Coordination Center
- Guangdong Branch of National Computer Network Emergency Response Technical Coordination Center
- Guangxi Branch of National Computer Network Emergency Response Technical Coordination Center
- Hainan Branch of National Computer Network Emergency Response Technical Coordination Center
- Sichuan Branch of National Computer Network Emergency Response Technical Coordination Center
- National Computer Network Emergency Response Technical Coordination Center Chongqing Branch
- Yunnan Branch of National Computer Network Emergency Response Technical Coordination Center
- National Computer Network Emergency Response Technical Processing Coordination Center Guizhou Branch
- National Computer Network Emergency Response Technical Processing Coordination Center Tibet Branch
- Qinghai Branch of National Computer Network Emergency Response Technical Coordination Center
- Xinjiang Branch of National Computer Network Emergency Response Technical Coordination Center
- Gansu Branch of National Computer Network Emergency Response Technical Processing Coordination Center
- National Computer Network Emergency Response Technical Processing Coordination Center Shaanxi Branch
- Hunan Branch of National Computer Network Emergency Response Technical Coordination Center
- Hubei Branch of National Computer Network Emergency Response Technical Coordination Center
- Henan Branch of National Computer Network Emergency Response Technical Coordination Center
