= Lu Wei (politician) =

Chinese politician

- 鲁炜
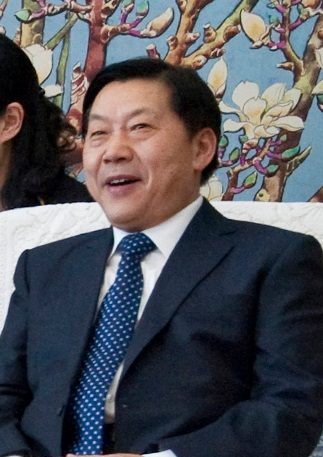
- Lu Wei

Director of the Cyberspace Administration of China
- In office August 2013 – June 2016
- General secretary: Xi Jinping
- Preceded by: Wang Chen
- Succeeded by: Xu Lin

Vice-Mayor of Beijing
- In office March 2011 – April 2013
- Leader: Guo Jinlong → Wang Anshun (mayor)

Personal details
- Born: January 1960 (age 66) Chaohu, Anhui, China
- Party: Chinese Communist Party (expelled)
- Education: Guangxi University of Radio and Television; Renmin University of China

Lu Wei (simplified Chinese: 鲁炜; traditional Chinese: 魯煒; pinyin: Lǔ Wěi; born January 1960) is a former Chinese politician. He served as the deputy head of the Publicity Department of the Chinese Communist Party, the head of the General Office of the Central Leading Group for Internet Security and Informatization (one and the same with the Cyberspace Administration of China, CAC) from August 2013 to June 2016. Lu was previously Vice-Mayor of Beijing and the head of the Beijing Party organization's Publicity Department, among other posts. Lu was named by Time magazine as one of the world's 100 most influential people in 2015. Multiple charges brought in 2017 resulted in Lu being sentenced to fourteen years in prison in 2019.

== Biography ==
Lu was born in Chaohu, Anhui in January 1960. He earned a reputation as being relatively brash and colorful within the party and government bureaucracy.

In 1991, Lu worked in Xinhua News Agency of Guangxi province as the deputy director, he was promoted to become the Director in 1997.

From 2001 to 2004, he rose through the ranks to become deputy director of Xinhua News Agency.

In March 2011, Lu was appointed as the Vice-Mayor of Beijing, the Minister of Beijing Publicity Department and a Standing Committee member of the Beijing Municipal Party Committee. He remained in that positions until April 2013, when he was appointed the Chairman of State Internet Information Office, the vice-chairman of State Council Information Office. In 2013, he became head of the Cyberspace Administration of China.

At the 13th China Internet Media Forum on October 30, 2013, Lu made a presentation that thematized the Chinese Dream, a term that Chinese Communist Party general secretary Xi Jinping had popularized since late 2012.

In May 2014, Lu was promoted to deputy minister of the Publicity Department.

Lu visited the United States during the first week of December 2014. In Washington, D.C. he conferred with senior administration officials such as the National Security Council about issues such as alleged Chinese hacking activities and censorship. In Silicon Valley, he was greeted warmly by the top management of major firms such as Apple, Facebook, and eBay.

Lu suddenly stepped down from his post at the Cyberspace Administration of China in June 2016, for unknown reasons. While Lu remained a deputy head of the Publicity Department, he relinquished all other titles of import. Foreign media speculated that this might signal a shift in Chinese internet policy. Lu was placed under investigation for corruption in November 2017, making him the first official of provincial rank to be investigated for corruption following the 19th Party Congress. He was expelled from the Communist Party in February 2018. The Central Commission for Discipline Inspection said Lu was "arbitrary and tyrannical", abused his power for personal gain, violated the Six Major Disciplines, and pretended to follow the rules. Other offences included using all means to build personal fame, making false and anonymous accusations against others, deceiving the top Communist leadership, extreme disloyalty, duplicity, trading power for sex, improper discussion of the party and a lack of self-control.

On October 19, 2018, the Ningbo Intermediate People's Court heard Lu Wei's bribery case. He took advantage of his position to seek benefit for others and accepted a large sum of money. Lu has been accused of bribing about 32 million yuan. He pleaded guilty to corruption in October. On March 26, 2019, Lu was sentenced to 14 years in prison and fined three million yuan.

Government offices
Preceded by Wang Chen	Director of the Cyberspace Administration of China; 2013–2016	Succeeded by Xu Lin
Party political offices
Preceded by Cai Fuchao	Minister of the Publicity Department of CCP Beijing Municipal Committee; 2011–2013	Succeeded by Li Wei
