= Guizhou Provincial People's Government =

Guizhou Provincial People's Government 贵州省人民政府
- Established: August 1949; 76 years ago

Leadership
- Governor: Li Bingjun since November 2020
- Parent body: Central People's Government; Guizhou Provincial People's Congress
- Elected by: Guizhou Provincial People's Congress

Meeting place
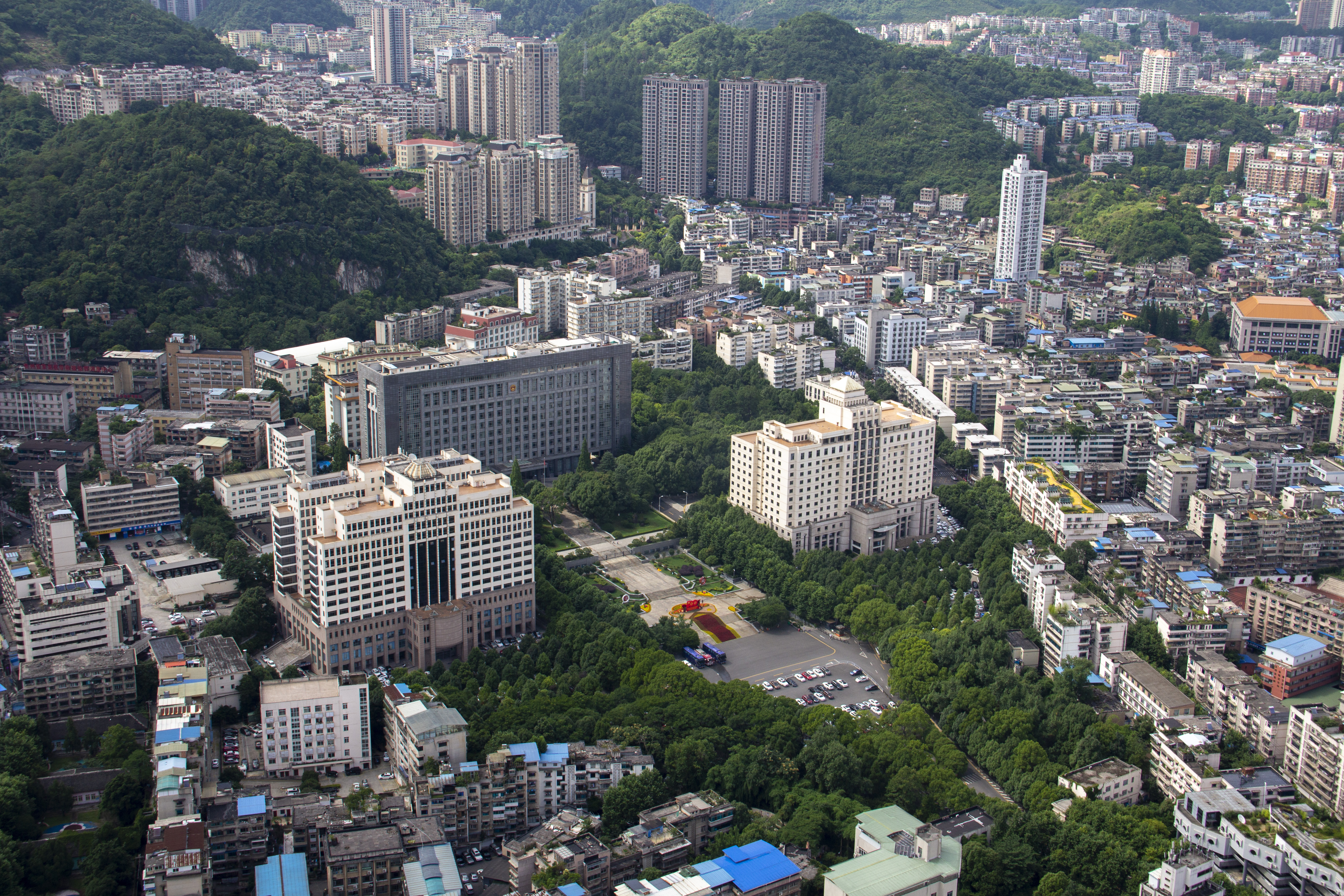
- Headquarters

Website
- www.guizhou.gov.cn

Guizhou Provincial People's Government
- Simplified Chinese: 贵州省人民政府
- Traditional Chinese: 貴州省人民政府
Transcriptions
Standard Mandarin
- Hanyu Pinyin: Guìzhōushěng Rénmín Zhèngfǔ

The Guizhou Provincial People's Government (Chinese: 贵州省人民政府) is the local administrative agency of Guizhou. It is officially elected by the Guizhou Provincial People's Congress and is formally responsible to the Guizhou Provincial People's Congress and its Standing Committee. Under the country's one-party system, the governor is subordinate to the secretary of the Guizhou Provincial Committee of the Chinese Communist Party. The Provincial government is headed by a governor, currently Li Bingjun.

== History ==
The Guizhou Provincial People's Government was founded in December 1949. Its name was changed to Guizhou Provincial People's Committee (贵州省人民委员会) in February 1955 and subsequently Guizhou Provincial Revolutionary Committee (贵州省革命委员会) in December 1967 during the Cultural Revolution. It reverted to its former name of Guizhou Provincial People's Government in January 1980.

== Organization ==
The organization of the Guizhou Provincial People's Government includes:

- General Office of the Guizhou Provincial People's Government

=== Component Departments ===
- Guizhou Provincial Development and Reform Commission
- Guizhou Provincial Education Department
- Guizhou Provincial Science and Technology Department
- Guizhou Provincial Industry and Information Technology Department
- Guizhou Provincial Ethnic and Religious Affairs Commission
- Guizhou Provincial Public Security Department
- Guizhou Provincial Civil Affairs Department
- Guizhou Provincial Justice Department
- Guizhou Provincial Finance Department
- Guizhou Provincial Human Resources and Social Security Department
- Guizhou Provincial Natural Resources Department
- Guizhou Provincial Ecology and Environment Department
- Guizhou Provincial Housing and Urban Rural Development Department
- Guizhou Provincial Transportation Department
- Guizhou Provincial Water Resources Department
- Guizhou Provincial Agriculture and Rural Affairs Department
- Guizhou Provincial Commerce Department
- Guizhou Provincial Culture and Tourism Department
- Guizhou Provincial Health Commission
- Guizhou Provincial Veterans Affairs Department
- Guizhou Provincial Emergency Management Department
- Guizhou Provincial Audit Office
- Foreign Affairs Office of Guizhou Provincial People's Government

=== Directly affiliated special institution ===
- State-owned Assets Supervision and Administration Commission of Guizhou Provincial People's Government

=== Organizations under the government ===
- Guizhou Provincial Administration for Market Regulation
- Guizhou Provincial Energy Bureau
- Guizhou Provincial Radio and Television Bureau
- Guizhou Provincial Sports Bureau
- Guizhou Provincial Bureau of Statistics
- Guizhou Provincial Medical Security Bureau
- Guizhou Provincial People's Government National Defense Mobilization Office
- Guizhou Provincial Rural Revitalization Bureau
- Guizhou Provincial Office Affairs Management Bureau
- Guizhou Province Big Data Development Management Bureau
- Guizhou Provincial Local Financial Supervision and Administration Bureau
- Guizhou Provincial Ecological Immigration Bureau
- Guizhou Provincial Forestry Bureau

=== Public institutions ===
- Guizhou Provincial People's Government Development Research Center
- Guizhou Academy of Sciences
- Guizhou Academy of Social Sciences
- Guizhou Academy of Agricultural Sciences
- Guizhou Provincial Geological and Mineral Exploration and Development Bureau
- Guizhou Provincial Coalfield Geological Bureau
- Guizhou Provincial Nonferrous Metals and Nuclear Industry Geological Exploration Bureau
- Guizhou Provincial Institute of Culture and History
- Guizhou Provincial Investment Promotion Bureau
- Guizhou Provincial Federation of Supply and Marketing Cooperatives

=== Departmental management organization ===
- Guizhou Provincial Grain and Material Reserve Bureau
- Guizhou Provincial Prison Administration Bureau
- Guizhou Provincial Drug Rehabilitation Administration
- Guizhou Provincial Administration of Traditional Chinese Medicine
- Guizhou Provincial Drug Administration

=== Agency ===
- Gui'an New Area
- Beijing Office of the Fujian Provincial People's Government
