= Central Cyberspace Affairs Commission =

Organization of the Chinese Communist Party

- 中央网络安全和信息化委员会
- Emblem of the Chinese Communist Party

Agency overview
- Formed: February 2014
- Preceding agency: Central Leading Group for Cybersecurity and Informatization
- Type: Supra-ministerial policy coordination and consultation body
- Jurisdiction: Chinese Communist Party
- Headquarters: Beijing
- Agency executives: Cai Qi, Leader; Zhuang Rongwen, Office Director
- Parent agency: Central Committee of the Chinese Communist Party
- Child agency: Office of the Central Cyberspace Affairs Commission (with the external brand name Cyberspace Administration of China)

Central Cyberspace Affairs Commission
- Simplified Chinese: 中央网络安全和信息化委员会
Transcriptions
Standard Mandarin
- Hanyu Pinyin: Zhōngyāng Wǎngluò Ānquán hé Xìnxīhuà Wěiyuánhuì

The Central Cyberspace Affairs Commission is a policy formulation and implementation body set up under the Central Committee of the Chinese Communist Party for the purpose of managing cybersecurity and informatization, including internet censorship. This decision-making body comprises the leaders of all major party and state departments, along with the People's Bank of China and the military.

The Central Cyberspace Affairs Commission runs the Public Opinion Information Center, which coordinates with state media outlets on censorship. The commission's executive arm is the Office of the Central Cyberspace Affairs Commission, which has the external name of the Cyberspace Administration of China under the "one institution with two names" system.

== History ==
The commission was originally established as the Central Leading Group for Cybersecurity and Informatization (Chinese: 中央网络安全和信息化领导小组; pinyin: Zhōngyāng Wǎngluò Ānquán Hé Xìnxī Huà Lǐngdǎo Xiǎozǔ), also called the Cyberspace Affairs Leading Group. The decision to establish the group was announced at the 3rd Plenary Session of the 18th Central Committee in November 2013, but did not hold its first full meeting until February 2014. The Leading Group was not a wholly new created entity, since it was primarily a reconstitution of the Leading Group for National Informatization, with a similar membership composition.

In March 2018, the leading group was transformed into a commission as part of the deepening the reform of the Party and state institutions, called the Central Cybersecurity and Informatization Commission, also called the Central Cyberspace Affairs Commission (CCAC). According to the South China Morning Post, Cai Qi succeeded Xi as the head of the commission in early 2023.

== Membership ==
=== 18th Committee ===
In 2014, the committee composition was:

- Leader
  - Xi Jinping (Secretary General of the Communist Party, Chairman of the Central Military Commission, Chairman of the National Security Commission)
- Deputy leaders
  - Li Keqiang (Member of the Politburo Standing Committee, Premier of the State Council, vice chairman of the National Security Commission)
  - Liu Yunshan (Member of the Politburo Standing Committee, First Secretary of the Secretariat of the Central Committee Central Committee)
- Members
  - Ma Kai (Politburo member, vice-premier of the State Council)
  - Wang Huning (Politburo member, director of the Central Policy Research Office)
  - Liu Qibao (Politburo member, director of the Propaganda Department)
  - Fan Changlong (Politburo member, vice-chairman of the Central Military Commission)
  - Meng Jianzhu (Politburo member, Secretary of the Central Political and Legal Affairs Commission)
  - Li Zhanshu (Politburo member, head of the General Office of the Chinese Communist Party)
  - Guo Shengkun (State Councilor and Minister of Public Security)
  - Zhou Xiaochuan (Vice Chairman of the Chinese People's Political Consultative Conference, Governor of the People's Bank of China)
  - Yang Jing (Secretary of the Party Secretariat, State Councilor, and Secretary General of the State Council)
  - Lu Wei (deputy director of the State Council Information Office, Director of the Cyberspace Administration)
  - Fang Fenghui (Member of the CMC and PLA Chief of General Staff)
  - Wang Yi (Minister of Foreign Affairs)
  - Xu Shaoshi (Head of the National Development and Reform Commission)
  - Yuan Guiren (Minister of Education)
  - Wang Zhigang (Party secretary of the Ministry of Science and Technology)
  - Lou Jiwei (Minister of Finance)
  - Miao Wei (Minister of Industry and Information Technology)
  - Cai Wu (Minister of Culture)
  - Cai Fuchao (Director of the State Administration of Press, Publication, Radio, Film and Television)

=== 19th Committee ===
- Leader
  - Xi Jinping (Politburo Standing Committee Member, Party General Secretary, State President)
- Deputy Leaders
  - Li Keqiang (Politburo Standing Committee, Premier of the State Council)
- Director of the General Office
  - Zhuang Rongwen, concurrently Director of the Cyberspace Administration of China, deputy head of the Publicity Department, deputy director of the State Council Information Office (SCIO)

=== 20th Committee ===
- Director
  - Cai Qi (Politburo Standing Committee Member, First Secretary of the Secretariat)
- Director of the General Office
  - Zhuang Rongwen, concurrently Director of the Cyberspace Administration of China, deputy head of the Publicity Department, deputy director of the State Council Information Office (SCIO)
