= Shen Yiqin =

Chinese politician (born 1959)

- 谌贻琴
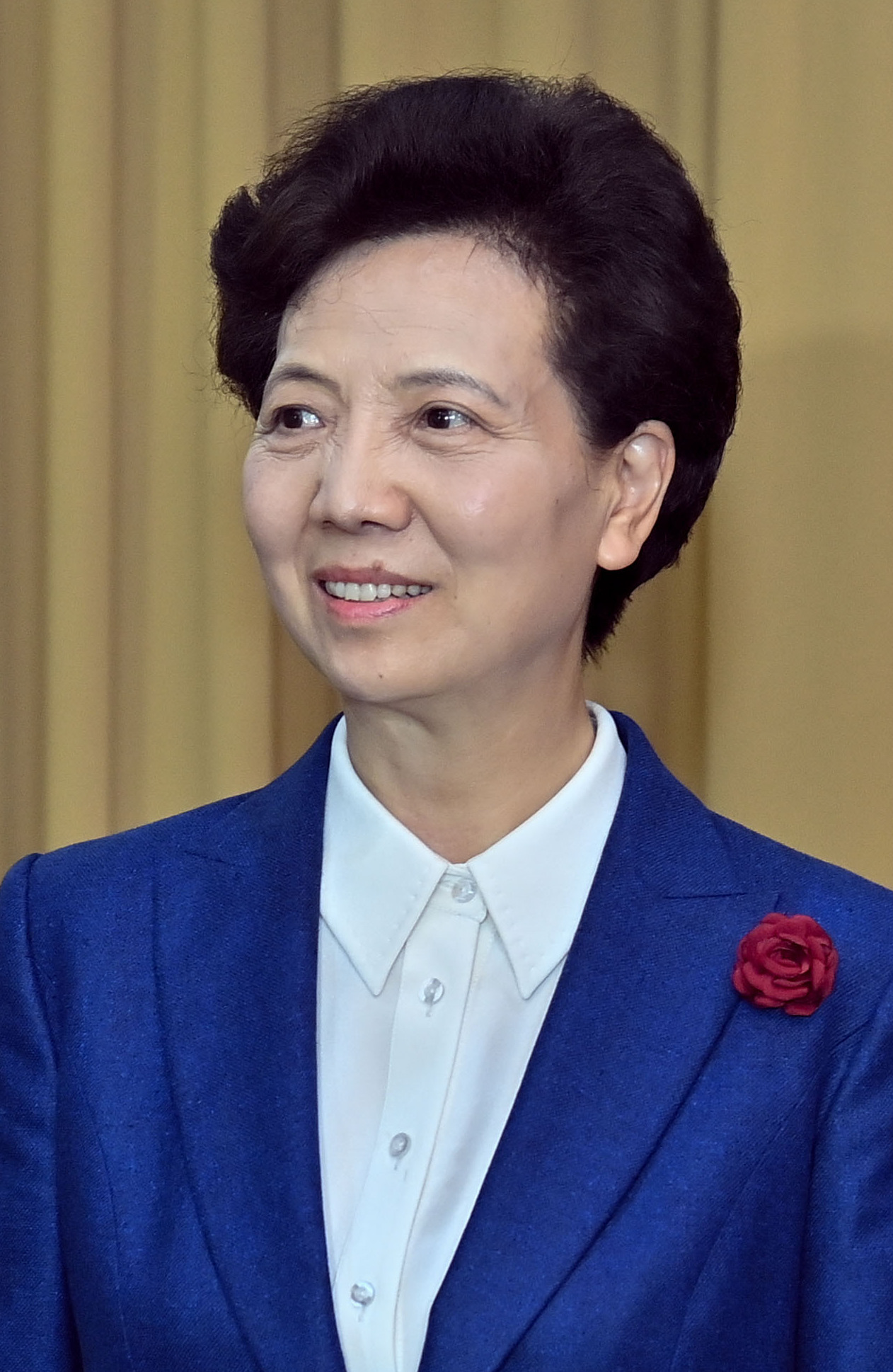
- Shen in 2023

State Councilor of China
- Incumbent
- Assumed office 12 March 2023 Serving with Wang Xiaohong and Wu Zhenglong
- Premier: Li Qiang

President of the All-China Women's Federation
- Incumbent
- Assumed office 25 October 2023
- Preceded by: Shen Yueyue

Party Secretary of Guizhou
- In office 20 November 2020 – 9 December 2022
- Deputy: Li Bingjun (Governor)
- General Secretary: Xi Jinping
- Preceded by: Sun Zhigang
- Succeeded by: Xu Lin

Governor of Guizhou
- In office 6 September 2017 – 24 November 2020
- Preceded by: Sun Zhigang
- Succeeded by: Li Bingjun

Personal details
- Born: 15 December 1959 (age 66) Zhijin County, Guizhou, China
- Party: Chinese Communist Party
- Education: Guizhou University (BLit)

Shen Yiqin (Chinese: 谌贻琴; pinyin: Shèn Yíqín; born 15 December 1959) is a Chinese politician of Bai ethnic heritage who is currently a state councilor and President of the All-China Women's Federation since 2023. She previously served as the Party Secretary of Guizhou, a province in southwestern China, between November 2020 and December 2022.

Shen is the third female provincial-level party chief since the founding of the People's Republic of China in 1949 after Wan Shaofen and former Vice Premier Sun Chunlan.

== Early life and education ==
Shen was born in Zhijin County, Guizhou, in December 1959, and is of Bai ethnicity. Shen belonged to a group of sent-down youth at the close of the Cultural Revolution era. From March 1977 to April 1978, shortly after the Cultural Revolution, she was a sent-down youth in Zhijin County, where she served as secretary of her team's Youth League branch. She began studying history at Guizhou University, where she studied from April 1978 to January 1982.

== Party school career ==
After graduating, Shen was sent to work for the provincial party school in Guizhou, where she was a teaching assistant, a lecturer and deputy head of its teaching office for party history and party building. She joined the Chinese Communist Party (CCP) in May 1985. From 1990 to 1992, she was seconded to serve as deputy party secretary of Zhijin County. She later became a human resources manager there, heading the school's personnel office from March 1993. In August 1995, she became vice president of the Guizhou party school, and in 1998 she was also made its deputy party secretary. From 1998 to 2001, she studied economics in the in-service graduate programme of the Central Party School. In February 1999, she became party group secretary and vice chair of the Guizhou Federation of Social Sciences.

== Political career ==
=== Guizhou ===
In December 2001, Shen became deputy party chief of Qiannan Buyei and Miao Autonomous Prefecture, then deputy party chief and commissioner of Tongren Prefecture in January 2003. In April 2007, Shen became a member of the Standing Committee of Guizhou Provincial Committee of the Chinese Communist Party, and from May 2007 she headed the provincial party Publicity Department. At the 17th Party Congress in October 2007, Shen was elected an alternate member of the CCP Central Committee.

In May 2012, she was named Executive Vice Governor of Guizhou. Later that year, she was reelected as an alternate of the Central Committee in the 18th Party congress. From May 2014, she was also secretary of the provincial party committee's financial work committee. In April 2015, she became Deputy Secretary and the Political and Legal Affairs Commission (Zhengfawei) Secretary of CCP Guizhou Committee. She also briefly remained a vice governor and headed the provincial office for the maintenance of stability. At the time of her appointment to the deputy party chief position, she became the fifth and the last post-55 (born from 1955 to 1959 inclusive) female deputy secretary of provincial CCP committee, and the first female provincial Zhengfawei chief in the country.

In September 2017, Shen was appointed as the acting Governor of Guizhou, the first female and the first Guizhou-born person since 1993 on this duty. She was elected governor by the provincial people's congress in January 2018. In October 2017, at the 19th Party Congress, Shen was elected a full member of the Central Committee.

In November 2020, Shen was appointed as the CCP Secretary of Guizhou. At the time, she was the only woman serving as a provincial party secretary in China. She resigned as governor on 24 November 2020, and Li Bingjun became acting governor. On 23 November 2020, Guizhou announced that its last nine poverty-stricken counties had been removed from the poverty list, the last counties in China to be delisted. As party secretary, she also chaired the Standing Committee of the Guizhou Provincial People's Congress.

In September 2022, a bus taking residents of Guiyang to a COVID-19 quarantine facility crashed, killing 27 people and injuring 20, which drew public anger at local officials and China's zero-COVID policy. Three officials of Guiyang's Yunyan District were suspended and placed under investigation. Shen stepped down as provincial party chief in December 2022 to take up a new role that was not announced at the time. She was elected a member of the Central Committee again at the 20th Party Congress in October 2022.

=== State Council ===
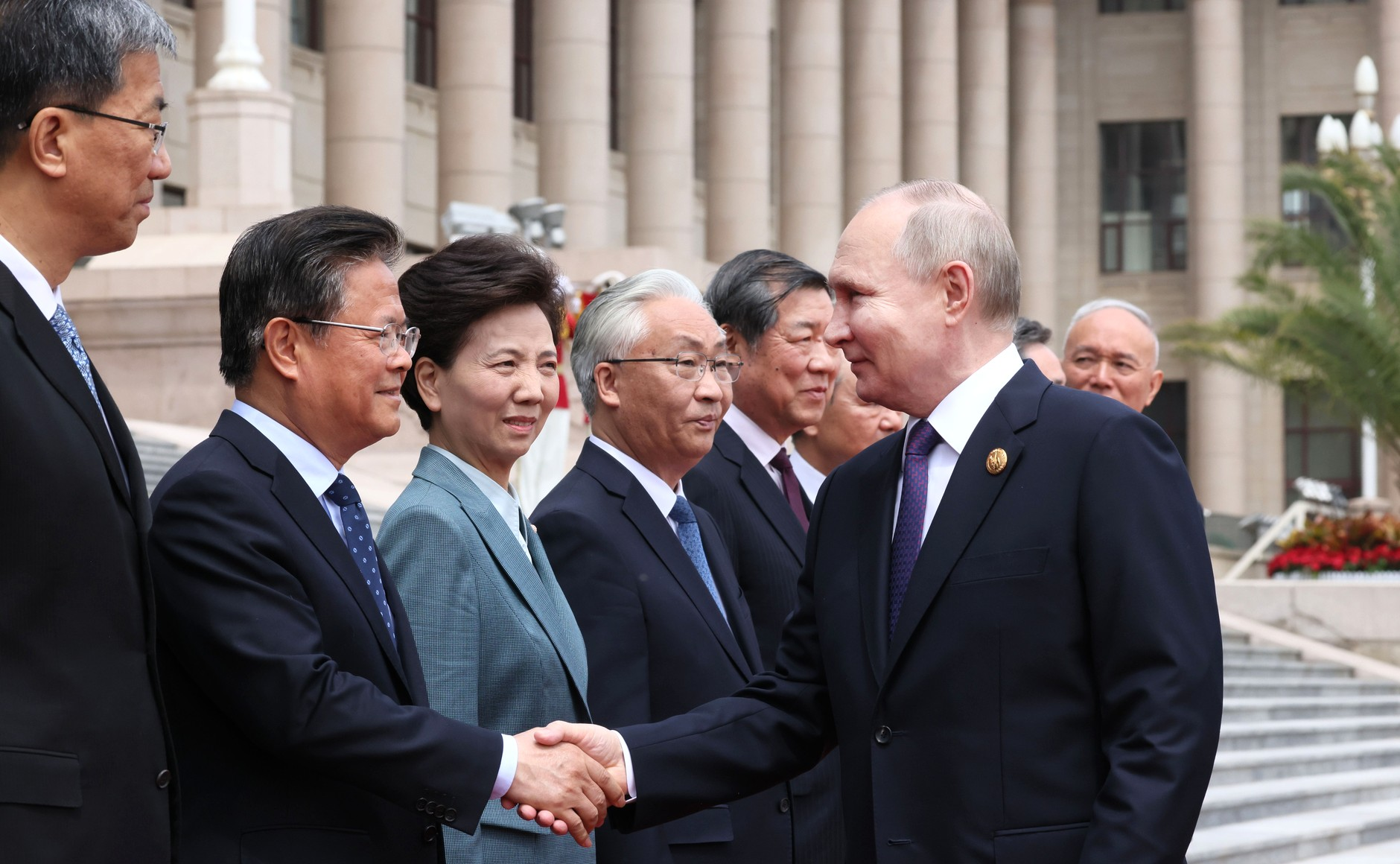
Shen Yiqin with Russian President Vladimir Putin in Beijing during Putin's visit to China in May 2024

In March 2023, Shen was appointed as a state councilor and in charge of human resource affairs, social affairs, civil affairs, women and children affairs and ethnic affairs. According to the Asia Society Policy Institute, her portfolio covers civil affairs, human resources and social security, veterans affairs and sport, and she also serves as the liaison to the National Ethnic Affairs Commission and the Ministry of Culture and Tourism. Her appointment made her the only woman in China's top leadership, five months after the 20th Party Congress had produced an all-male Politburo, and she was not herself a member of the Politburo. Political scientist Victor Shih called her rise "a milestone", but said that her lack of Politburo rank would limit her effectiveness. She is also the director of the State Council's National Working Committee on Children and Women, and a deputy to the 14th National People's Congress.

Shen with European Commissioner for Innovation, Research, Culture Iliana Ivanova in Beijing (2024)

On 25 October 2023, Shen was appointed as the President of the All-China Women's Federation (ACWF). On 30 October, Xi Jinping met the federation's new leaders and told them that it should serve as a bond between women and the party and government. Later that month, in an article in the Party's top theoretical journal Qiushi, Shen wrote that women must contribute to the "great cause of national rejuvenation and demonstrate the power of half the sky", continuing by writing the work of women and the ACWF should always follow "the correct political path and the party's lead". In the article, she also pledged to promote women's role in the family and to guide young people's views on love and marriage, in support of the party's birth policies.

After the Global Leaders' Meeting on Women was held in Beijing in October 2025, Shen told women's federations across China on 19 October that the meeting had set a new milestone for women's causes worldwide, and called on them to promote the "high-quality development" of women's work. At the 2026 International Women's Day, Shen called on women to follow the CCP, support the 15th Five-Year Plan, and "consolidate the family foundation for Chinese-style modernization." On 31 March 2026, she led a delegation to the Hong Kong Family and Women Development Summit, and met the Chief Executive John Lee at Government House.

Government offices
Preceded by Sun Zhigang	Governor of Guizhou; 2017–2020	Succeeded by Li Bingjun
Party political offices
Preceded by Sun Zhigang	Party Secretary of Guizhou; 2020–2022	Succeeded by Xu Lin
Civic offices
Preceded by Shen Yueyue	President of the All-China Women's Federation; 2023–present	Incumbent
