= China Film Administration =

Chinese Communist Party organization

- 国家电影局
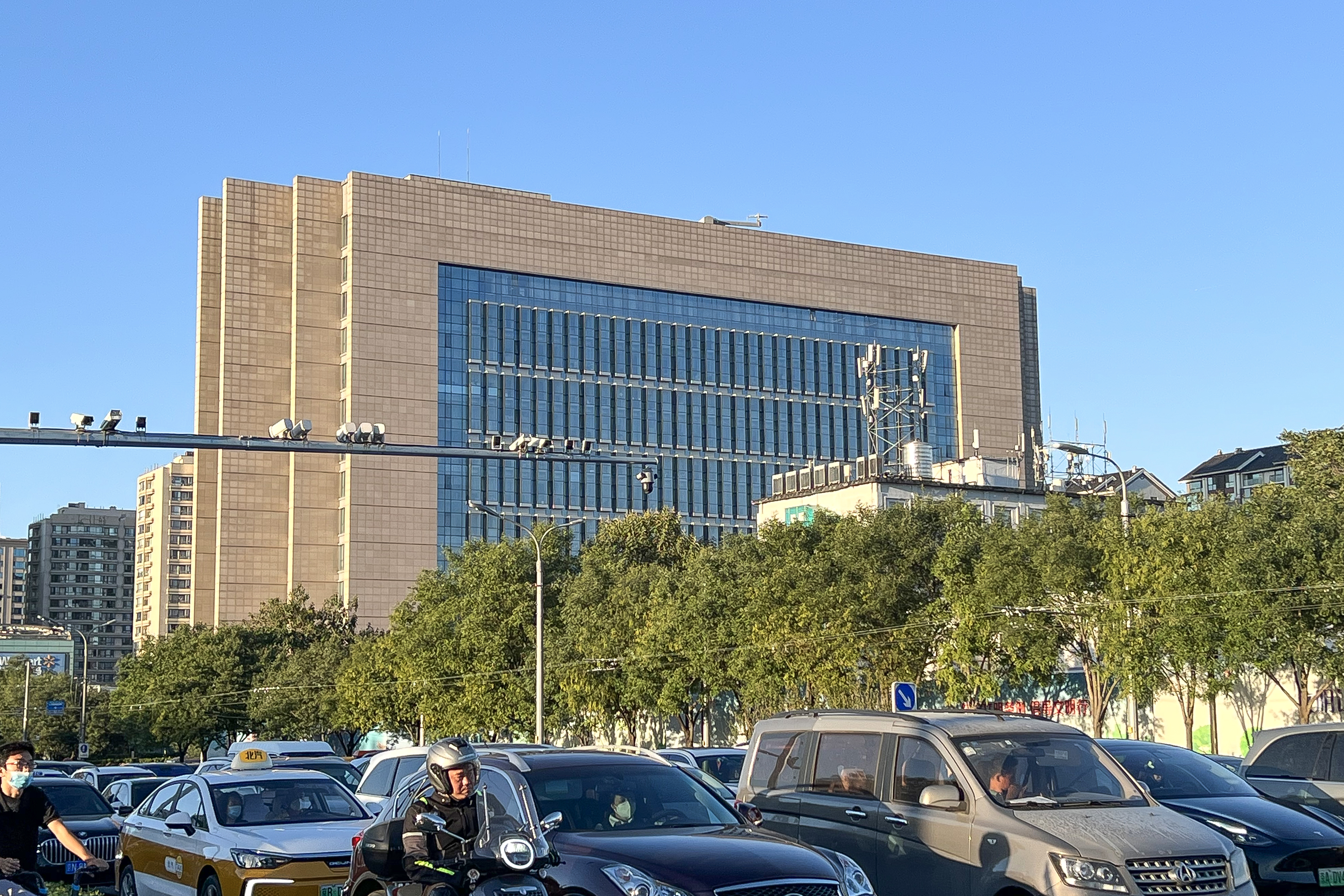
- Headquarters

Film regulator overview
- Formed: 16 April 2018
- Jurisdiction: Government of China
- Status: External name of the Publicity Department of the Chinese Communist Party
- Headquarters: No. 40 Xuanwumenwai Street, Xicheng District, Beijing
- Website: www.chinafilm.gov.cn

Chinese name
- Simplified Chinese: 国家电影局
- Traditional Chinese: 國家電影局
Transcriptions
Standard Mandarin
- Hanyu Pinyin: Guójiā Diànyǐngjú

The China Film Administration (CFA) is the regulatory body for China's film industry. It is also an external name of the Publicity Department of the Chinese Communist Party. The Film Bureau of the Publicity Department is responsible for CFA's work.

== History ==
In March 2018, as part of the deepening the reform of the Party and state institutions, the news and publication management responsibilities of the State Administration of Press, Publication, Radio, Film and Television was transferred to the Publicity Department, which also would the name of the China Film Administration as a one institution with two names. On 16 April 2018, the China Film Administration was officially established.

In July 2024, the China Film Administration announced that all short films may only appear at foreign film festivals or exhibitions if they obtain permits for public screenings.

== Functions ==
The CFA reviews films and dictates whether a movie gets released.

== Organization ==
According to relevant regulations, the China Film Administration was added as a signboard to the Publicity Department, and the Film Bureau of the Publicity Department is responsible for specific work. The Film Bureau of the Publicity has the following institutions:

- General Office
- Production Office
- Arts Department
- Market Department
- International Cooperation Office
