= China Cyberspace Research Institute =

Chinese state-backed think tank

- 中国网络空间研究院
- Formation: 2015; 11 years ago
- Type: Think tank
- Headquarters: Beijing
- President: Xia Xueping

The China Cyberspace Research Institute is a think tank established in 2015 with the approval of the Central Committee of the Chinese Communist Party and the Cyberspace Administration of China. Its first president was Yang Shuzhen. The current president (as of 2022) is Xia Xueping.

It also hosts the China Internet Information Center magazine, which was launched in March 2022.

== History ==
The China Cyberspace Research Institute was established in 2015 with the approval of the Central Committee of the Chinese Communist Party and the Cyberspace Administration of China.

In May 2024, the China Cyberspace Research Institute announced a large language model whose training data includes Xi Jinping Thought.
