= Cai Fuchao =

Chinese journalist and politician

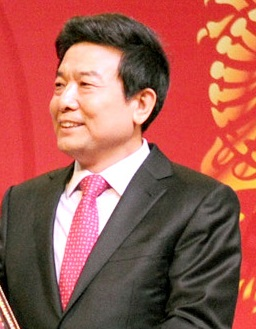
Cai Fuchao

Cai Fuchao (Chinese: 蔡赴朝; born April 1951) is a Chinese journalist, politician, and propaganda official. He previously served as deputy head of the Publicity Department of the Chinese Communist Party and director of the State Administration of Press, Publication, Radio, Film and Television (formerly State Administration for Radio and Television, or SARFT), and vice-mayor of Beijing.

== Biography ==
Cai was born and raised in Beijing, and spent much of his career there. He has a doctorate in literature. He began work as a traffic publicity office worker, then in 1979 he began working for Beijing Daily, the Communist Party's flagship local newspaper of Beijing. There he worked as a journalist and also worked in its business department. He was later promoted to deputy editor-in-chief. In June 1998, he became deputy head of propaganda in Beijing and head of the municipal information office. In 2002, he was named to the municipal Party Standing Committee, and became propaganda chief of Beijing. In 2008 he began serving concurrently as vice mayor of Beijing.

In March 2011, he was transferred to serve as deputy head of the Propaganda Department of the Chinese Communist Party, and also took over as head of SARFT. SARFT was reformed in 2013 and became the State Administration of Press, Publication, Radio, Film and Television.

Cai was a member of the 18th Central Committee of the Chinese Communist Party.

== Investigation ==
On 15 July 2026, Cai was put under investigation for alleged "serious violations of discipline and laws" by the Central Commission for Discipline Inspection (CCDI), the party's internal disciplinary body, and the National Supervisory Commission, the highest anti-corruption agency of China.

Government offices
| New title | Director of the State Administration of Press, Publication, Radio, Film and Television | Next: Nie Chenxi |
| Previous: Wang Taihua | Director of the State Administration of Radio, Film, and Television | Next: Agency withdrawal |
Party political offices
| Previous: Jiang Xiaoyu (politician) | Director of the Publicity Department of the CCP Beijing Municipal Committee | Next: Lu Wei |
