= Six Major Disciplines =

Chinese Communist Party regulations

The Six Major Disciplines (Chinese: 六大纪律) are the provisions of the Chinese Communist Party (CCP) on party style and clean government building. The disciplines are in the "Regulations on Inspection Work of the Chinese Communist Party" issued by the CCP's Central Commission for Discipline Inspection and Organization Department.

== Content ==
The six major disciplines include the CCP's political discipline, organizational discipline, integrity discipline, mass discipline, work discipline, and life discipline.

== Implementation ==
Since 2017, many parts of the country have launched various educational activities centered around the six major disciplines.

=== Disciplinary violations ===
On February 13, 2018, the Central Commission for Discipline Inspection issued an announcement expelling Lu Wei from the CCP and removing him from public office, and transferring him to the state judicial authorities for handling. The announcement used unusually harsh words to say, "As a senior Party cadre, Lu Wei lacks ideals and beliefs, has no Party spirit or principles, is extremely disloyal to the Party Central Committee, lacks any of the four consciousnesses, and violates all six disciplines. He is a typical double-faced person, and is a typical example of someone who has not restrained himself or stopped since the 18th National Congress of the Party. His problems are serious and concentrated, and the masses have strong reactions. His political and economic problems are intertwined. His nature is extremely bad and the circumstances are particularly serious."
