= National Office for Philosophy and Social Sciences =

Chinese Communist Party body

- 全国哲学社会科学工作办公室
- Formation: 2018; 8 years ago
- Type: Office
- Headquarters: No. 5 West Chang'an Avenue, Xicheng District, Beijing
- Director: Xu Chunsheng
- Parent organization: Publicity Department of the Chinese Communist Party
- Website: www.nopss.gov.cn

The National Office for Philosophy and Social Sciences (NOPSS) is a bureau-level public welfare institution under the Publicity Department of the Chinese Communist Party, responsible for work related to philosophy and social sciences. Its logo is the same as that of the National Social Science Fund. Its office is located at No. 5 West Chang'an Avenue, Xicheng District, Beijing, within the Publicity Department, at the former site of Prince Yi's Mansion.

== History ==
In 1991, the CCP Central Committee decided to establish the National Philosophy and Social Sciences Planning Office under the National Philosophy and Social Sciences Planning Leading Group as the office of the National Philosophy and Social Sciences Planning Leading Group. The office consists of the Planning Department, the Fund Department, the Results Department, the Research Department, the Publicity Department, and the General Affairs Department.

In January 2018, the CCP Central Committee decided to establish the National Leading Group for Philosophy and Social Sciences, under which the National Office for Philosophy and Social Sciences was established. The National Office for Philosophy and Social Sciences is the office of the National Leading Group for Philosophy and Social Sciences and is responsible for handling the daily work of the Leading Group. Guangming Daily and China Social Sciences Daily have both published special issues on the National Social Science Fund.

== Structure ==
The National Office for Philosophy and Social Sciences has the following institutions:

=== Internal institutions ===
- General Office (Finance Office)
- Organization and Coordination Office
- Community Management Office
- Research Office
- Think Tank Liaison Office
- Think Tank Research Department
- Project Planning Department
- Fund Management Office
- Results Management Office
- Publicity Department

=== Discipline Review Group ===
The National Leading Group for Philosophy and Social Sciences has several subject review groups under it, and they perform the duties of the subject review groups of the National Social Science Fund. Their members are appointed by the National Leading Group for Philosophy and Social Sciences, and the term of appointment is generally five years. Some members can be appropriately adjusted as needed within five years.

According to data at the end of 2018, there are 23 subject review groups:

- Marxist - Leninist Society
- Party History and Party Building
- philosophy
- Theoretical Economics
- Applied Economics
- Management
- statistics
- Political Science
- sociology
- Demography
- Law
- International Studies
- Chinese History
- World History
- archeology
- Ethnic Studies
- Religious Studies
- Chinese literature
- Foreign Literature
- linguistics
- Journalism and Communication
- Library, Information and Documentation
- Sports Science

The responsibilities of the subject review group are:

1. Conduct regular surveys on the development of philosophy and social sciences disciplines, and make recommendations for the formulation of national philosophy and social sciences research plans and the selection of topics for national social science fund projects;
2. Review applications for National Social Science Fund projects and make funding recommendations for National Social Science Fund projects;
3. Assist the National Office of Philosophy and Social Sciences in supervising and inspecting the implementation of National Social Science Fund projects, and provide evaluation opinions and improvement suggestions;
4. To appraise, review and evaluate the research results of important projects of the National Social Science Fund;
5. Recommend outstanding research achievements and outstanding talents in philosophy and social sciences.
6. Complete other tasks assigned by the National Philosophy and Social Sciences Leading Group.

==== Separate disciplines ====
Education, art, and military science are listed separately in the National Social Science Fund. The planning, application, review, management, appraisal and completion of the three disciplines are handled by the National Education Science Planning Leading Group Office (located in the Chinese Academy of Educational Sciences of the Ministry of Education), the National Art Science Planning Leading Group Office (located in the Science and Technology Education Department of the Ministry of Culture and Tourism), and the PLA Philosophy and Social Science Planning Office (located in the Academy of Military Sciences of the Chinese People's Liberation Army). Funding for the three disciplines of education, art, and military science is allocated separately by the National Social Science Fund. Relevant management measures are formulated separately by the three disciplines.

=== Entrusted management agency ===
The National Office for Philosophy and Social Sciences has entrusted the Philosophy and Social Sciences Planning Offices of provinces, autonomous regions, municipalities directly under the Central Government and the Xinjiang Production and Construction Corps (all located in the Propaganda Departments of the Party Committees at the same level) and the Philosophy and Social Sciences Planning Office of the PLA, as well as the Research Department of the Central Party School, the Research Bureau of the Chinese Academy of Social Sciences, and the Social Science Department of the Ministry of Education to assist in the application and management of national social science fund projects in their respective regions and systems. Its main responsibilities are:

1. Organize philosophy and social science researchers in the region and system to apply for national social science fund projects;
2. Review the authenticity and validity of materials submitted by applicants or project leaders in this region and system;
3. Supervise the implementation of guarantee conditions for the implementation of National Social Science Fund projects;
4. Cooperate with the National Social Science Work Office to supervise and inspect the implementation of National Social Science Fund projects and the use of funding, and appraise, review and promote the research results of National Social Science Fund projects.

The National Social Science Work Office provides guidance and supervision for the relevant work of each entrusted management agency.
