= Zhuang Rongwen =

Chinese politician

- 庄荣文

Deputy Head of the Publicity Department of the Chinese Communist Party
- Incumbent
- Assumed office April 2018
- Head: Huang Kunming; Li Shulei

Director of the Cyberspace Administration of China
- Incumbent
- Assumed office August 2018
- Preceded by: Xu Lin

Personal details
- Born: February 1961 (age 65) Quanzhou, Fujian, China
- Party: Chinese Communist Party
- Education: Hohai University

Chinese name
- Simplified Chinese: 庄荣文
- Traditional Chinese: 莊榮文
Transcriptions
Standard Mandarin
- Hanyu Pinyin: Zhuāng Róngwén
Southern Min
- Hokkien POJ: Chng Êng-bûn
- Tâi-lô: Tsng Îng-bûn

Zhuang Rongwen (Chinese: 庄荣文; Pe̍h-ōe-jī: Chng Êng-bûn; born February 1961) is a Chinese politician, currently serving as director of the Cyberspace Administration of China, director of the Office of the Central Cyber Security and Informatization Commission, deputy director of the State Council Information Office, and deputy head of the Publicity Department of the Chinese Communist Party.

He is a representative of the 20th National Congress of the Chinese Communist Party and a member of the 20th Central Committee of the Chinese Communist Party. Zhuang was included in Time 100 AI list in 2024.

== Early life and education ==
Zhuang was born in Quanzhou, Fujian, in February 1961, and graduated from Hohai University.

== Political career ==
Zhuang joined the Chinese Communist Party (CCP) in June 1987. He assumed various administrative and political roles in Fujian before being transferred to the central government in 2010.

He was director of the Department of Economy, Science and Technology of the Overseas Chinese Affairs Office of the State Council in December 2010 and subsequently deputy director of the office in June 2014. In August 2015, he was appointed deputy director of the Cyberspace Administration of China. He was appointed deputy head of the Publicity Department of the Chinese Communist Party in April 2018, concurrently serving as head of the National Press and Publication Administration. He was chosen as director of the State Internet Information Office in August 2018. He also serves as director of the Office of the Central Cyber Security and Informatization Commission and deputy director of the State Council Information Office.

Government offices
Preceded by Ma Rupei	Deputy Director of the Overseas Chinese Affairs Office of the State Council; 2014–2015	Succeeded by Wang Xiaoping
Preceded by Peng Bo	Deputy Director of the State Internet Information Office; 2015–2018	Succeeded by Liu Liehong
New title	Head of the National Press and Publication Administration; 2018	Succeeded by TBA
Preceded by Xu Lin	Deputy Director of the State Council Information Office; 2018–	Incumbent
Preceded by Xu Lin	Director of the State Internet Information Office; 2018–	Incumbent
Party political offices
Preceded by Peng Bo	Deputy Director of Central Network Security and Informatization Leading Group Office; 2015–2018	Succeeded by Liu Liehong
Preceded by Xu Lin	Director of the Office of the Central Cyber Security and Informatization Commission; 2018–	Incumbent
