= China Internet Illegal Information Reporting Center =

Chinese government body

- Logo of the China Internet Illegal Information Reporting Center
- Native name: 违法和不良信息举报中心
- Available in: Chinese
- Founded: June 10, 2004; 22 years ago
- Owner: Cyberspace Administration of China
- Website: www.12377.cn
- Registration: Optional
- Current status: Active

China Internet Illegal Information Reporting Center
- Simplified Chinese: 违法和不良信息举报中心
- Traditional Chinese: 違法及不良資訊檢舉中心
Transcriptions
Standard Mandarin
- Hanyu Pinyin: Wéifǎ hé Bùliáng Xìnxī Jǔbào Zhōngxīn

The China Internet Illegal Information Reporting Center (CIIRC) is a reporting website operated by the Cyberspace Administration of China (CAC). It was sponsored and established by the Internet News Information Service Working Committee of the Internet Society of China.

Launched on June 10, 2004, the website serves as the secretariat of the Internet News Information Service Working Committee of China and is supported by the State Council Information Office. Its purpose is to "report illegal information and safeguard the public interest". In May 2014, it was transferred to the management of the CAC and became a directly affiliated institution.

== History ==
After the publication of the "Several Opinions of the CCP Central Committee and the State Council on Further Strengthening and Improving the Ideological and Moral Construction of Minors" in March 2004, the establishment of a reporting website was included in the No. 4 Document of the Central Civilization Committee in 2004. Therefore, the Internet News and Information Service Working Committee, with the support of the State Council Information Office, began to prepare to establish a reporting website. On June 10, 2004, the Internet "Illegal and Bad Information Reporting Center" was officially established. The domain name used by its website is a second-level domain name under the "China Net" china.com.cn led by the State Council Information Office - "net.china.com.cn".

On March 29, 2004, the Internet News and Information Service Working Committee announced the "Internet News Information Service Self-Discipline Convention"; on June 10, 2004, the Illegal and Bad Information Reporting Center announced the "Internet Site Prohibition of Spreading Obscene, Pornographic and Other Bad Information Self-Discipline Norms". On June 13, 2004, the first batch of illegal websites in China that spread obscene and pornographic content were closed. On December 22, 2004, the "Self-discipline Code for Internet Search Engine Service Providers to Resist Pornography, Obscenity and Other Illegal and Harmful Information" was announced at the second plenary meeting of the committee. On July 1, 2004, Cai Mingzhao, deputy director of the State Council Information Office, and Hu Qiheng, chairman of the Internet Society of China, visited the Reporting Center to provide guidance.

On June 10, 2005, the website of the Illegal and Harmful Information Reporting Center adopted a new version. On April 22, 2006, the "Civilized Internet Management and Civilized Internet Access" theme publicity day was held. On January 29, 2007, the "Daxing Network Civilization" experience exchange meeting was held. On April 12 of the same year, the Ministry of Public Security and other ten ministries and commissions jointly launched the "National Special Campaign to Combat Pornography and Obscenity on the Internet in accordance with the Law". Since the establishment of the Illegal and Harmful Information Reporting Center, by August 3, 2007, it had received more than 500,000 reports of various types. On January 22, 2008, the Ministry of Public Security and other 13 ministries and commissions continued to carry out special campaigns across China to combat pornography and other harmful information on the Internet in accordance with the law.

== Structure ==
The CIIRCS's official purpose is to "report illegal information and safeguard the public interest". On June 29, 2004, the Illegal and Harmful Information Reporting Center received "full recognition" from the central leadership. Li Jiaming, Secretary-General of the Internet News Information Service Working Committee, was appointed Director of the Reporting Center. The "China Internet Illegal Information Reporting Center consists of four departments:

- Reporting Department
- Monitoring Department
- Social Work Department
- General Affairs Department

== Policy ==
Since the beginning of 2009, under the deployment of the State Council Information Office, the Ministry of Industry and Information Technology, the Ministry of Public Security, the Ministry of Culture, the State Administration for Industry and Commerce, the State Administration of Radio, Film and Television, and the General Administration of Press and Publication, a large-scale "special campaign to rectify vulgarity on the Internet" has been launched. The Illegal and Harmful Information Reporting Center exposed a large number of websites, claiming that they contain vulgar content and requiring rectification, including some large portals such as Sina, Baidu, Sohu, and Google. After being exposed, most of these websites publicly apologized and expressed their acceptance of criticism and supervision and rectification. However, during this rectification campaign, a number of dissident websites that have nothing to do with pornography and vulgarity (such as NiuBo.com and Amnesty International) were also closed or blocked.

Starting in April 2014, the National Office for the Fight against Pornography and Illegal Publications, the Cyberspace Administration of China, the Ministry of Industry and Information Technology, and the Ministry of Public Security launched a special campaign called "Fighting Pornography and Illegal Publications: Cleaning the Internet 2014." During this period, the Illegal and Unhealthy Information Reporting Center exposed a large number of websites, claiming that they contained "pornographic" content and requiring them to rectify, cooperate with censorship, or shut down. On June 3, the State Administration of Press, Publication, Radio, Film, and Television also claimed that "85% of the more than 3,000 reports received by the Illegal and Unhealthy Information Reporting Center every day were about pornographic websites." The services of large portals such as Sina, Baidu, and Tencent were exposed and publicly apologized, accepting criticism and supervision and carrying out rectification.
