= Sun Zhigang =

Chinese politician (born 1954)

- 孙志刚

Party Secretary of Guizhou
- In office 15 July 2017 – 20 November 2020
- Deputy: Shen Yiqin (party affairs)
- Preceded by: Chen Min'er
- Succeeded by: Shen Yiqin

Governor of Guizhou
- In office 16 October 2015 – 6 September 2017
- Preceded by: Chen Min'er
- Succeeded by: Shen Yiqin

Personal details
- Born: 30 May 1954 (age 72) Xingyang, Henan, China
- Party: Chinese Communist Party (1976–2024; expelled)
- Education: Wuhan Institute of Metallurgy; Shanghai University of Finance and Economics

Chinese name
- Simplified Chinese: 孙志刚
- Traditional Chinese: 孫志剛
Transcriptions
Standard Mandarin
- Hanyu Pinyin: Sūn Zhìgāng

Sun Zhigang (Chinese: 孙志刚; born 30 May 1954) is a former Chinese politician who was Party Secretary of Guizhou. He was formerly mayor of Yichang, the secretary-general of the Hubei party committee under Yu Zhengsheng, the Vice Governor of Anhui province, and chief of the national office for health care reform.

== Early life and career in academia ==
Sun Zhigang was born in May 1954 in Xingyang, Henan. He joined the work force in February 1971 during the Cultural Revolution as a sent-down youth in Xingyang. In 1973, he entered Wuhan Institute of Metallurgy (now incorporated into Wuhan University of Science and Technology) as a "Worker-Peasant-Soldier student". He joined the Chinese Communist Party (CCP) in September 1976.

After graduating from college, Sun stayed at his alma mater as an instructor. He entered the Shanghai University of Finance and Economics to pursue graduate studies in economics, then he became, for a brief period, a research fellow at Zhongnan University of Economics and Law. In April 1985, he quit academia to pursue a career in politics, entering the Wuhan municipal government.

== Political career ==
In Wuhan, the provincial capital, Sun became the deputy head of the city's economics commission, and also in charge of economic restructuring. He became the district deputy party chief, then governor of Hanyang District. In March 1993 he was named vice mayor of Wuhan, then transferred to serve as the mayor of Yichang in August 1996, and promoted to party chief in March 1999. He became a member of the provincial Party Standing Committee in June 2002, and the secretary-general of the Party Committee, becoming chief of staff under then-party chief Yu Zhengsheng.

Beginning in September 2006, Sun began serving as executive vice governor of Anhui province, and a member of the party ruling council there. After a comprehensive set of health care reforms were put into effect by the central government, Sun spearheaded implementation of the reforms in Anhui province, pioneering a government drug purchase program which was circulated at the national level and dubbed the "Anhui model." He was then tasked with implementing the Anhui model nationwide, taking on the role of deputy director of the National Development and Reform Commission in March 2010, and then in December 2010, the chief of the Office of Health Care Reform. In a government reshuffle in March 2013, Sun was named deputy director of the National Health and Family Planning Commission.

On 16 October 2015, Sun was appointed acting governor of Guizhou province, succeeding Chen Min'er, who had been promoted to provincial party chief. Sun's governorship was duly confirmed by the provincial People's Congress on 30 January 2016.

In July 2017, Sun was appointed as the CCP Committee Secretary of Guizhou.

In December 2020, Sun was appointed as the Deputy Chairperson of the National People's Congress Financial and Economic Affairs Committee.

== Downfall ==
On August 28, 2023, Sun was investigated for "severe violations of discipline and law" by the Central Commission for Discipline Inspection.

In February 2024, Sun was expelled from the CCP and arrested for bribery. On August 14, he stood trial for graft at the No. 2 Intermediate People's Court of Tianjin, and was indicted for accepting bribes worth 813 million yuan (about 113.87 million U.S. dollars). Sun has been sentenced to death, with a two-year reprieve on October 29.

Government offices
Preceded by Guo Yuanzhang	Mayor of Yichang; 1996–1999	Succeeded by Wang Zhenyou
Preceded by Ren Haishen	Executive Vice Governor of Anhui; 2006–2010	Succeeded by Zhao Shucong
Preceded by Zhang Mao	Director of the Office of the Leading Group for Deepening the Reform of the Medical and Health System under the State Council; 2010–2015	Succeeded by Wang Hesheng
Preceded by Chen Min'er	Governor of Guizhou; 2015–2017	Succeeded by Shen Yiqin
Party political offices
Preceded by Tian Zhenya	Party Secretary of Yichang; 1996–1999	Succeeded by Zheng Shaosan
Preceded by Song Yuying	Secretary-General of the Hubei Provincial Committee of the Chinese Communist Party; 2002–2006	Succeeded by Li Mingbo
Preceded by Chen Min'er	Party Secretary of Guizhou; 2017–2020	Succeeded by Shen Yiqin
Assembly seats
Preceded by Chen Min'er	Chairman of the Guizhou Provincial People's Congress; 2018–2021	Succeeded by Shen Yiqin
