= China Book Publishing House =

Chinese publishing company

China Book Press 中国书籍出版社
- Status: Active
- Founded: August 23, 1986
- Headquarters location: Beijing
- Owner: China Research Institute of the Publishing Science
- Official website: www.chinabp.com.cn

China Book Publishing House
- Simplified Chinese: 中国书籍出版社
- Traditional Chinese: 中國書籍出版社
Transcriptions
Standard Mandarin
- Hanyu Pinyin: Zhōngguó Shūjí Chūbǎnshè

China Book Publishing House (simplified Chinese: 中国书籍出版社; traditional Chinese: 中國書籍出版社), commonly known as China Book Press, is a Beijing-based publishing house in the People's Republic of China. It is a comprehensive publishing house, supervised by the General Administration of Press and Publication, sponsored and owned by the China Research Institute of the Publishing Science (中国出版科学研究所).

China Book Publishing House was established on August 23, 1986. Its main publishing scope includes academic works related to the publication and distribution of scientific research in China and abroad, as well as textbooks, reference books, historical materials, biographies, popular reading materials.

== Important published books ==
- History of Publishing in China (中国出版史), 1991.
- Dancing with Wolves: China Joins the WTO (与狼共舞: 中国加入WTO), 1998.
- History of Movable-type Printing in China (中国活字印刷史), 1998.
- Historical Materials for Publishing in the People's Republic of China (中华人民共和国出版史料), 2009.
- Rule the World: Inside the Mysterious Masonic (统治世界：神秘共济会揭秘), 2011.
