= Li Bingjun =

Chinese politician

- 李炳军

Governor of Guizhou
- Incumbent
- Assumed office 24 November 2020
- Preceded by: Shen Yiqin
- Party Secretary: Shen Yiqin; Xu Lin

Personal details
- Born: February 1963 (age 63) Linqu County, Shandong
- Party: Chinese Communist Party
- Education: Shandong College of Chemical Industry

Li Bingjun (Chinese: 李炳军, born February 1963) is a Chinese politician, serving since November 2020 as the Governor of Guizhou.

== Biography ==
Li was born in Linqu County, Shandong. He joined the Chinese Communist Party (CCP) in March 1984. In the same year, he graduated from Shandong College of Chemical Industry (present-day Qingdao University of Science and Technology) with a bachelor's degree. He had been served as the Deputy Governor of Jiangxi Province (2013–2015), CCP Committee Secretary of Ganzhou (2015–2020), CCP Deputy Committee Secretary of Jiangxi (2018–2020).

In November 2020, Li was appointed as the Deputy Party Secretary of Guizhou named acting Governor of Guizhou. He was elected as the Governor in January 2021.
