= Publicity Department of the Chinese Communist Party =

Division of the CCP Central Committee

Publicity Department of the Central Committee of the Chinese Communist Party
- 中国共产党中央委员会宣传部
- Emblem of the Chinese Communist Party

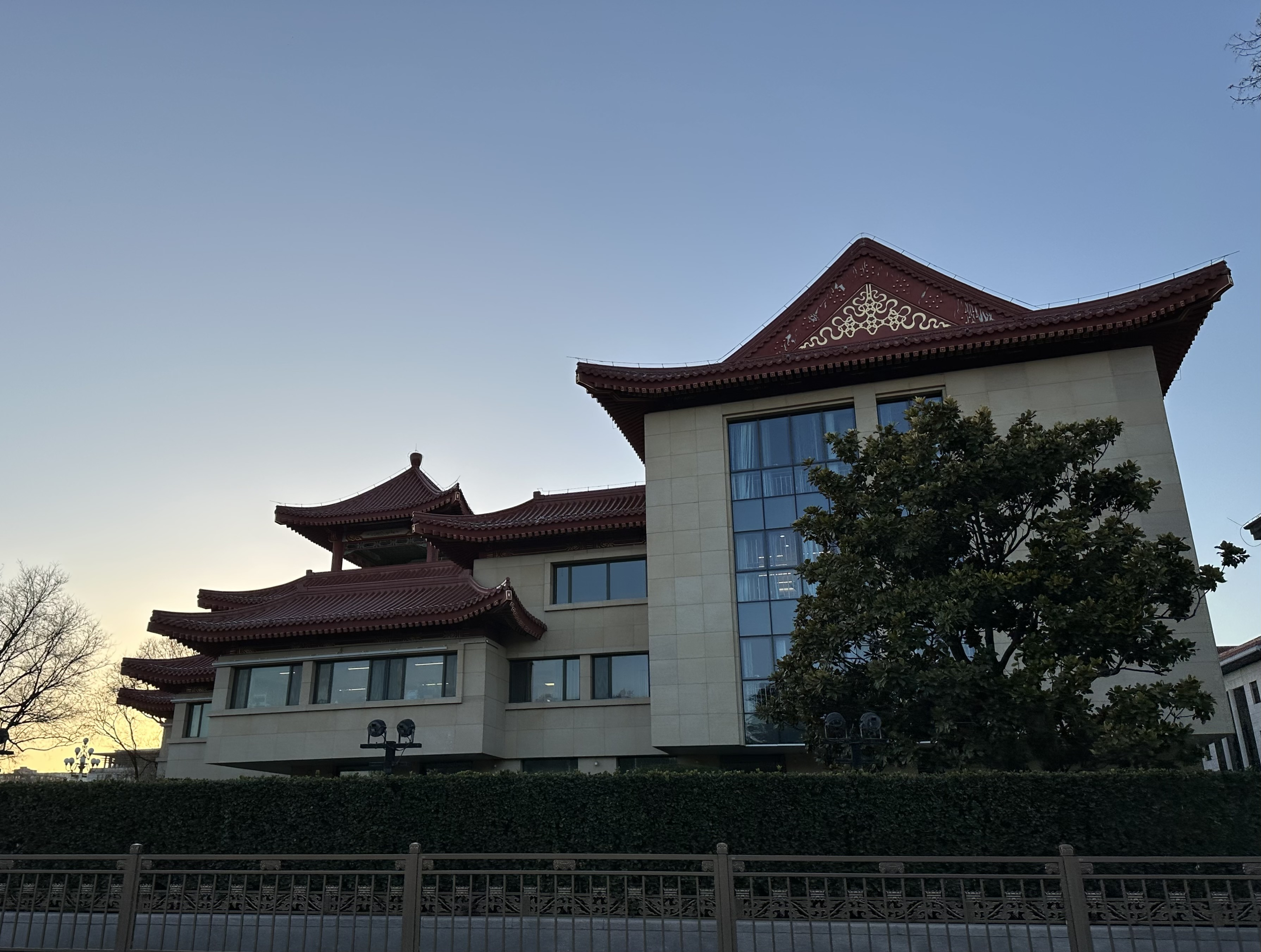
- Headquarters of the Publicity Department

Agency overview
- Formed: May 1924; 102 years ago
- Type: Department directly reporting to the Central Committee; Ministerial level agency
- Jurisdiction: Chinese Communist Party
- Headquarters: 5 Chang'an Avenue, Xicheng District, Beijing; 39°55′26″N 116°23′55″E
- Minister responsible: Li Shulei, Head
- Deputy Ministers responsible: Hu Heping, Executive Deputy Head; Shen Haixiong*, Deputy Head; Zhuang Rongwen*, Deputy Head; Sun Yeli*, Deputy Head; Cao Shumin*, Deputy Head; Wang Gang, Deputy Head; Hong Dayong, Deputy Head
- Parent agency: Party Central Committee
- Child agencies: National Radio and Television Administration; China International Communications Group; National Office Against Pornography and Illegal Publications
- Website: www.wenming.cn

Footnotes
- *Maintains full minister-level rank

CCP Central Publicity Department (common abbreviation)
- Simplified Chinese: 中共中央宣传部
- Traditional Chinese: 中共中央宣傳部
Transcriptions
Standard Mandarin
- Hanyu Pinyin: Zhōnggòng Zhōngyāng Xuānchuánbù

Abbreviated as
- Simplified Chinese: 中央宣传部
- Traditional Chinese: 中央宣傳部
Transcriptions
Standard Mandarin
- Hanyu Pinyin: Zhōngyāng Xuānchuánbù

Further abbreviated as
- Chinese: 中宣部
Transcriptions
Standard Mandarin
- Hanyu Pinyin: Zhōngxuānbù

The Publicity Department of the Central Committee of the Chinese Communist Party, also known as the Propaganda Department or Central Propaganda Department, is an internal division of the Central Committee of the Chinese Communist Party (CCP) in charge of spreading official ideology and propaganda as well as media guidance and censorship.

The department was established by the CCP in May 1924, modeled on its counterpart in the Soviet Union. In 1941, the department was put in charge of leading and reviewing newspapers and magazines. It became responsible for implementing CCP policies in literary and artistic work and news work in 1943. After the establishment of the People's Republic of China in 1949, the department assumed a greater role in activities related to mass organizations, including trade unions, artists' associations, and party branches. The department was abolished shortly after the Cultural Revolution, with its powers transferred to the Cultural Revolution Group. In October 1977, after the end of the Cultural Revolution, the department was re-established. In 2018, the department's powers were expanded, with the newly created National Radio and Television Administration placed under its control as part of a series of institutional reforms.

The department exercises direct leadership over the media control system. It is one of the main entities that enforces media censorship and control in the People's Republic of China. The department also engages in propaganda for both domestic and foreign audiences to increase support for the CCP, and is responsible for researching, devising, and disseminating the ideology of the CCP. Additionally, the department monitors and researches public opinion about public support for CCP policies. Its inner operations are highly secretive.

== History ==
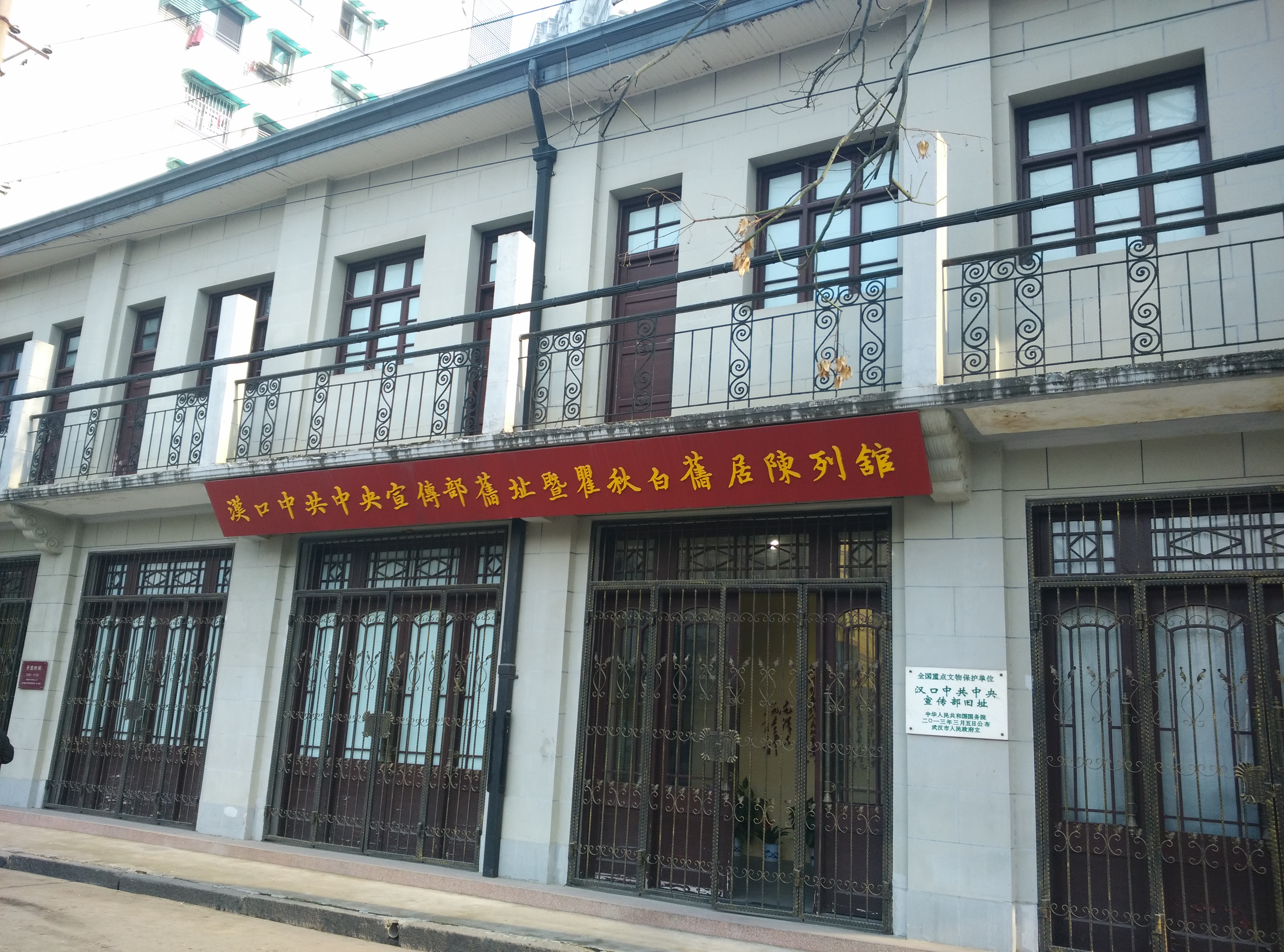
Former site in Hankou

Following the establishment of the Chinese Communist Party (CCP) at the 1st Party National Congress in 1921, the CCP Central Committee decided to establish the Central Propaganda Department. The department was founded in May 1924. At its establishment, the department was structured using its counterpart in the Soviet Union as a model. The 4th Party National Congress adopted the Resolution on Propaganda Work in 1925, which stipulated that "to make propaganda work perfect and systematic, the Central Committee should have a strong propaganda department to be responsible for all matters and to guide the local propaganda departments to have a close and systematic relationship with it."

In October 1928, the CCP Central Committee required provincial, county and district committees to set up local propaganda departments and that the party branches have officers to be responsible for propaganda work. In 1938, Mao Zedong stated that the department's focus should be publishing textbooks for soldiers and instructional material for cadres. During World War II, the department was assigned leadership and censorship tasks in the areas of theory, opinion, education, and culture as part of the war effort.

On 25 May 1941, the Central Committee adopted the Instructions on Unifying External Propaganda in Various Base Areas, which stipulated that "all external propaganda leadership should be unified under the Propaganda Department" and mandated that the Propaganda Department lead and review newspapers and magazines. The Outline of the Central Propaganda Department on the Party's Propaganda and Mobilization Work adopted on 20 June 1941 stated that "all theories, propositions, education, culture, literature and art, etc., belong to the scope of propaganda and mobilization activities" and "printing, radio and film are powerful tools for propaganda and mobilization." After 1943, the Central Propaganda Department was responsible for implementing the Party's policies in literary and artistic work and news work. In 1946, the Central Propaganda Department put forward requirements for positive propaganda in the Notice on the Propaganda Policy of Broadcasting and Newspapers.

=== After 1949 ===
Before the founding of the People's Republic of China, the Central Propaganda Department managed cultural and educational work. After the founding of the People's Republic of China in 1949, the department took on a greater role in activities related to mass organizations, such as trade unions, artists' associations, and party branches. It became an important mechanism for mass line politics. Under the leadership of the Central Propaganda Department, it organized the Central Broadcasting Administration, the Central Publishing Committee, the Central Film Administration and other institutions. In December 1949, the Central Propaganda Department issued an instruction that party newspapers at all levels should not publicly promote themselves as official newspapers of the CCP, nor should they say that they are official newspapers of the government; they should say that they are newspapers of a certain place.

In the autumn of 1962, the Central Propaganda Department began abolishing the Party Committee system in literary and artistic units. Xu Guangxiao implemented this system in the Ministry of Culture. Many units abolished the Party Committee system. In 1962, Yao Wenyuan's article criticizing "Hai Rui Dismissed from Office" was resisted by the Beijing Municipal Party Committee, headed by Peng Zhen, and the Central Propaganda Department, headed by Lu Dingyi. In 1966, Mao Zedong pointed out that the Central Propaganda Department was "the palace of the King of Hell" and that "the King of Hell should be overthrown and the little devils should be liberated." He criticized Peng Zhen, the Central Propaganda Department, and the Beijing Municipal Committee for protecting bad people, suppressing leftists, and not allowing revolution. He also said that if bad people were to be protected again, the Central Propaganda Department, the Beijing Municipal Committee, and the "Five-Person Group" would be dissolved.

Shortly after the Cultural Revolution, the Central Propaganda Department was abolished. According to the May 16 Notice of the Central Committee in May 1966, the Cultural Revolution Group concurrently held its powers. The appendix to the May 16 Notice stated: "The Central Propaganda Department is the palace of the King of Hell", "the King of Hell should be overthrown and the little devils should be liberated", and "the Central Propaganda Department should be dissolved". Lu Dingyi was labeled a "counter-revolutionary." Nine deputy ministers of the Propaganda Department were labeled "traitors," "spies," and "Kuomintang members," respectively. The minister, deputy ministers, and secretary-general of the Propaganda Department were the first to be implicated, referred to as the "Kings of Hell." An enlarged meeting of the Politburo made a "Decision on the Suspension and Removal of Comrades Peng Zhen, Lu Dingyi, Luo Ruiqing, and Yang Shangkun from Their Posts," and issued an "Explanation on the Errors of Comrades Lu Dingyi and Yang Shangkun". Tao Zhu was transferred to serve as Executive Secretary of the Secretariat, concurrently serving as Minister of the Propaganda Department. Deputy Ministers Xu Liqun, Yao Zhen, and Lin Mohan, and Secretary-General Tong Dalin were suspended from their duties for self-reflection.

On June 23, the Cultural Revolution Group of the Propaganda Department, headed by Tao Zhu, was established. In 1967, the department established the Office for the Translation of Chairman Mao's works. At a meeting of all staff members of the Propaganda Department, Tao Zhu announced the "Decision of the Central Committee on Reorganizing the Leadership of the Propaganda Department," and announced the abolition of the original departments and offices, replacing them with four departments and one office: the Department of Mao Zedong Thought Propaganda, the Department of Party Member and Cadre Education, the Department of Cadre Management, the Secretariat, and the Investigation and Research Office. On July 27, 1968, the Central Committee decided to impose military control over the former Central Propaganda Department. It appointed Li Xiao as head of the military control group and Wang Shaoping as deputy head. After the Central Propaganda Department was first smashed as a "palace of the King of Hell", propaganda, publishing and cultural departments at all levels of the Party and government were also "smashed" and then "militarily controlled".

In October 1977, the 11th CCP National Congress approved the "Report on the Establishment of the Central Propaganda Department", reorganized the department, restoring its original functions and powers, and appointed Zhang Pinghua as its head. The directive on the re-establishment of the Central Propaganda Department reveals the structure and organization of the "extremely secretive" body, according to Anne-Marie Brady. The directive states that the department will be set up with one Director and several deputies, and the organizational structure will be set up with one office and five bureaus. The office is responsible for political, secretarial, and administrative work, and the five bureaus are: the Bureau of Theory, the Bureau of Propaganda and Education, the Bureau of Arts and Culture, the Bureau of News, and the Bureau of Publishing. The directive states that the staff will be fixed at around 200 personnel, selected from propaganda personnel across the country in consultation with the Central Organization Department.

New departments and offices were established in 2004 to address the growing demands of information control. The Bureau of Public Opinion is in charge of commissioning public opinion surveys and other relevant research. The department organized networks of cultural workers' associations, which were headed by the China Federation of Literary and Art Circles. The state incorporated existing cultural enterprises into the state apparatus, which provided stable income and working environments for artists. In 2018, the newly created National Radio and Television Administration was put under its control as part of the plan for deepening the reform of the Party and state institutions.

== Name ==
The CCPPD has several Chinese names, each with different English translations. Officially, it is the Zhōngguó Gòngchăndǎng Zhōngyāng Wěiyuánhuì Xuānchuánbù ("Chinese Communist Party Central Committee Publicity Department") or Zhōnggòng Zhōngyāng Xuānchuánbù ("Chinese Communist Party Central Publicity Department" or "Central Publicity Department of the Communist Party of China"), colloquially abbreviated as the Zhōnggòng Xuānchuánbù "Chinese Communist Party Publicity Department" or "Publicity Department of the Communist Party of China", or simply Zhōng xuānbù (中宣部).

The term xuanchuan (宣传 "propaganda; publicity") has a neutral connotation. Some xuanchuan collocations can be translated as "propaganda" (e.g., xuānchuánzhàn 宣传战 "propaganda war"), others as "publicity" (xuānchuán méijiè 宣传媒介 "mass media; means of publicity"), and still others are ambiguous (xuānchuányuán 宣传员 "propagandist; publicist").

The department changed its official English name from "Propaganda Department of the Communist Party of China" to "Publicity Department of the Communist Party of China". As China's involvement in world affairs grew in the 1990s, the CCP became sensitive to the negative connotations of the English translation propaganda for xuanchuan. Official replacement translations include publicity, information, and political communication When Ding Guangen traveled abroad on official visits, he was known as the Minister of Information.

=== External names ===
Under the "one institution with two names" system, the Central Propaganda Department uses several external names for different purposes (e.g., a public government statement). These names include:

- State Council Information Office (SCIO, absorbed in 2014)
- National Press and Publication Administration (NPPA)
- National Copyright Administration (NCA)
- China Film Administration (CFA)

== Function ==
The Central Propaganda Department has a "direct leadership" (Chinese: 领导; pinyin: lingdao) role in the media control system, working with other organizations such as the National Radio and Television Administration. The Central Propaganda Department's tasks include managing, guiding, and censoring China's newspaper, publishing, radio, television, and film industries to align with the CCP. Internet censorship is handled by the Cyberspace Administration of China (CAC); the department has close ties with the CAC, with all CAC directors having served as deputy heads of the Publicity Department. The department also engages in propaganda work for both domestic and foreign audiences designed to increase support for the CCP. It is also responsible for researching, devising, and disseminating the ideology of the CCP, CCP theory, and the Core Socialist Values. Additionally, the department monitors and researches public opinion on support for CCP policies, tracks potential political instability, and engages in arts, culture, and foreign cultural exchanges, as well as human rights propaganda.

According to Bill Schiller of the Toronto Star, its scope is to control licensing of media outlets, and to give instructions to the media on what is and what is not to be said, especially about certain issues, such as Taiwan, Tibet, etc., that can affect state security, or the rule of the CCP. He says its central offices are located in an unmarked building near the Zhongnanhai at 5 West Chang'an Avenue, although the department has offices throughout the country at the provincial, municipal, and county level. Schiller says the editors-in-chief of China's major media outlets must attend the department's central office weekly to receive instructions on which stories should be emphasized, downplayed, or not reported at all. These instructions are not normally known to the public, but are communicated to media workers at the weekly meeting or via secret bulletins. However, since the rise of social networking tools, Propaganda Department instructions have been leaked to the internet. Examples presented by Schiller include "All websites need to use bright red color to promote a celebratory atmosphere [of the 60th anniversary of the People's Republic]" and "negative reports ... not exceed 30 per cent".

Operational and reporting freedom increased in the Chinese media in the early 2000s. However, open defiance against the Propaganda Department directives is rare, as dissenting media organizations risk severe punishment, including restructuring or closure. In 2000, a system of warnings was introduced for individual journalists, whereby repeat offenses can lead to dismissal. One Chinese journalist, Shi Tao, was sentenced to prison after giving Propaganda Department instructions to a pro-democracy website; according to an American organization, the Dui Hua Foundation, the case was related to "illegally providing state secrets to foreign entities".

One important way the Propaganda Department has ensured that the media system remains well controlled is by ensuring that the boundaries of acceptable reporting are kept "deliberately fuzzy" in an effort to ensure that "news workers self-censor to a critical degree."

=== Credentialing and monitoring media personnel ===
The department sets media policies and guidelines, licenses media agencies and internet companies, and registers and trains journalists.

According to a report from Freedom House, the Central Propaganda Department is the most important institution for monitoring media personnel and controlling the content of print and visual media.

The report says that the Central Propaganda Department plays a key role in monitoring editors and journalists through a national registration system. It also says that in 2003, the CPD, along with the General Administration of Press and Publication and the State Administration of Press, Publication, Radio, Film, and Television, required Chinese journalists to attend nearly 50 hours of training on Marxism, the role of CCP leadership in the media, copyright law, libel law, national security law, regulations governing news content, and journalistic ethics before renewing press identification passes in 2003. The report states that media personnel are required to participate in "ideological training sessions", where they are evaluated for their "loyalty to the party". Further "political indoctrination" courses are said to take place at meetings and training retreats, where participants study party political ideology and the media's role in "thought work" (sīxiǎng gōngzuò 思想工作).

In 2019, the Media Oversight Office (传媒监管局) of the Central Propaganda Department announced that training and testing of news professionals nationwide would be handled through the Xuexi Qiangguo mobile app.

According to Radio Free Asia, in December 2022, the department issued a directive stating that in order to obtain credentials as a professional journalist, they must pass a national exam and "must support the leadership of the Communist Party of China, conscientiously study, publicize and implement Xi Jinping's thoughts on the new era of socialism with Chinese characteristics, resolutely implement the party's theory, line, principles and policies, and adhere to the correct political direction and public opinion guidance".

== Structure ==
The leadership of the Propaganda Department is selected with guidance from the CCP General Secretary and the Politburo Standing Committee member responsible for the media, while local committees of the Propaganda Department work with lower levels of the party-state hierarchy to transmit content priorities to the media. The department's inner operations are highly secretive. The department has the following organizations:

=== Internal organization ===
- General Office
- Policy and Regulation Research Office
- Cadre Bureau
- Theory Bureau
- Publicity and Education Bureau
- Culture and Arts Bureau
- Public Opinion Information Bureau
- Government Information Bureau
- External Information Bureau
- International Liaison Bureau
- External Promotion Bureau
- International Communications Bureau
- Hong Kong, Macao, and Taiwan Information Bureau
- Human Rights Affairs Bureau (Human Rights Affairs Bureau of the State Council Information Office)
- Publishing House
- Media Regulatory Authority
- Printing and Distribution Bureau
- Office for the Fight Against Pornography and Illegal Publications (National Office for the Fight Against Pornography and Illegal Publications)
- Copyright Administration
- Import and Export Administration
- Film Bureau
- Civilization Creation Bureau
- Civilization Cultivation Bureau
- Civilized Practice Bureau
- Retired Cadres Bureau
- National Office for Philosophy and Social Sciences
- Office of Cultural System Reform and Development
- Administration Bureau
- Party Committee

=== Public institution managed by the Publicity Department ===
- China International Communications Group

=== Directly affiliated institutions ===
- Publicity Department Service Center (Information Center)
- Publicity and Public Opinion Research Center of the Publicity Department
- People's Publishing House
- China Press and Publication Research Institute
- News and Publishing Newspapers
- China Copyright Protection Center
- China National Library of Editions (Central Publicity Department Publications Data Center)
- Central Publicity Department Publication Product Quality Supervision and Inspection Center (Central Publicity Department Publication Review Center)
- National Publishing Fund Planning and Management Office
- China Research Institute of Film Science and Technology
- Film Technology Quality Inspection Institute of the Central Publicity Department
- China Film Archive (China Film Art Research Center)
- Film Script Planning and Design Center of the Central Publicity Department
- Film Digital Program Management Center of the Central Publicity Department
- Office of the National Film Industry Development Special Fund Management Committee
- Film Satellite Channel Program Production Center of the Central Publicity Department
- Human Rights Development and Exchange Center of the Central Publicity Department (Human Rights Development and Exchange Center of the State Council Information Office)
- National Publicity Cadres College
- Party Building Magazine
- Current Affairs Report Magazine
- China Daily
- Editorial Department of China Civilization Network
- Museum of the Chinese Communist Party
- Ideological and Political Work Research Magazine

=== Directly affiliated enterprises ===
- China Film Group Corporation
- China Intercontinental Communication Center
- Learning Publishing Company Limited
- China News Publishing & Media Group
- Thread Bookstore
- China Book Publishing House

=== Responsible social groups ===
- Chinese Society of Ideological and Political Work

=== Other ===
The department publishes a journal called International Communication (Chinese: 对外传播). The Central Propaganda Department manages the website dangjian.cn. It also runs the China Foundation for Human Rights Development.

The department also owns and controls the following state-owned enterprises:

- China Publishing Group
- Global Tone Communication Technology (GTCOM)

== Leaders ==
=== Composition as of the 20th Central Committee ===
- Head
  - Li Shulei, member of the Politburo
- Executive deputy head
  - Hu Heping, minister of Culture and Tourism, member of the Central Committee
- Deputy heads
  - Shen Haixiong, ministerial-level, head of the China Media Group, member of the CCP Central Committee
  - Zhuang Rongwen, ministerial-level, director of the Cyberspace Administration of China, member of the Central Committee
  - Cao Shumin, ministerial-level, director of the National Radio and Television Administration, alternate member of the Central Committee
  - Sun Yeli, ministerial-level, director of the State Council Information Office
  - Zhang Jianchun
  - Wang Gang

== See also ==
- Agitation Department of the SED Central Committee
- Propaganda and Agitation Department of the Workers' Party of Korea
