= People's Literature =

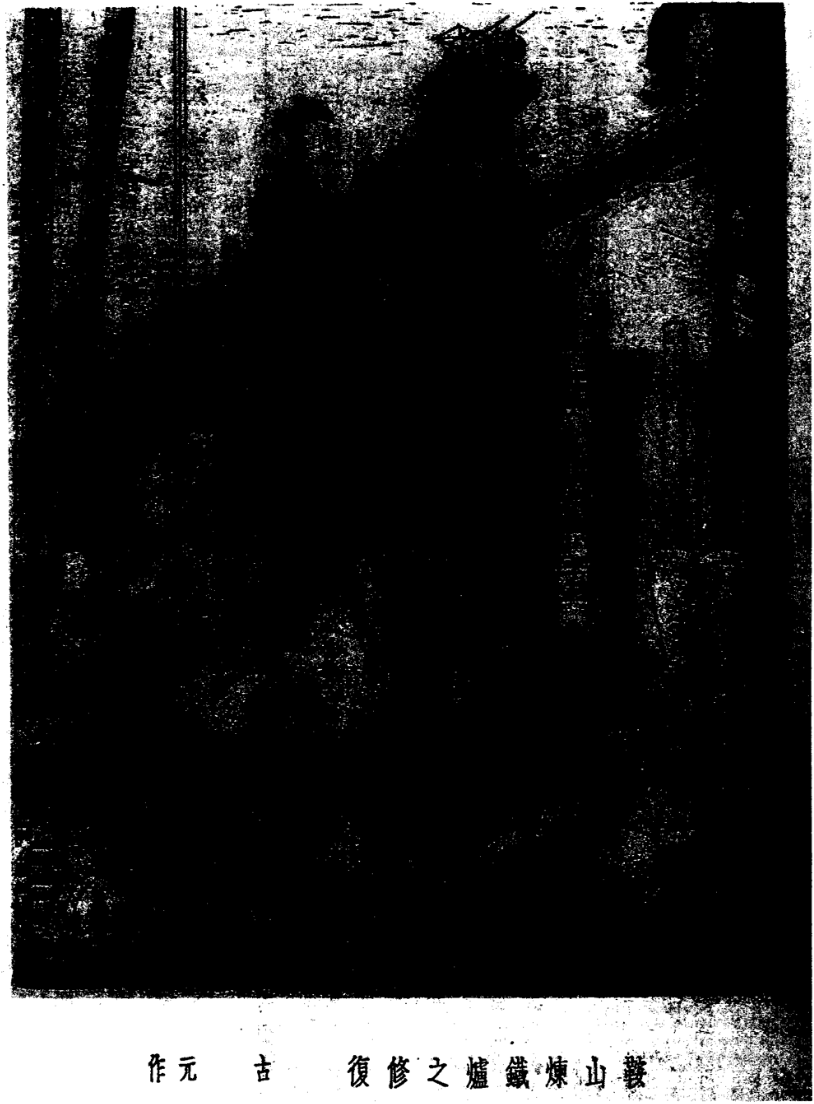
- First edition cover
- Frequency: Monthly
- First issue: October 1949
- Country: China
- Based in: Beijing
- Language: Chinese
- ISSN: 0258-8218

People's Literature (《人民文学》Renmin wenxue) is the oldest continuously published literary magazine in China, and the first literary magazine published in Communist China. Established in 1949, the magazine is published by the People's Literature Publishing House and issued by the Chinese Writers Association. Its head office is located at 166 Chaonei Ave, Beijing. Its current director is Pan Kaixiong (潘凯雄) and its current editor-in-chief is Guan Shiguang (管士光).

== History ==
=== Establishment ===
People's Literature was first established in 1949, as part of the outset of the ‘Seventeen-Year’ period in Chinese literature, referring to the seventeen years between the establishment of the People's Republic of China, and the Cultural Revolution. The First Congress of Literary and Art Workers (2–19 July 1949) brought together the cultural, artistic, and political representatives that would form the All China Federation of Literary and Art Circles, under which the Association of Literary Workers, chaired by Mao Dun, would be established. People's Literature would become the official organ of this body by the end of 1949, with Mao Dun as editor in chief and Ai Qing as assistant editor. The inaugural issue of the magazine contained an inscription from Mao Tse-Tung, stating "I hope that more good pieces of writing will be born of this."

The magazine's establishment was synonymous with the creation of 'People's Literature' as a new literary genre, as Xueping Zhong and Ban Wang write, this was “an event with profound historical implications and a clear historical trajectory. People’s literature was both a new historical concept and at the same time a history of its own development.”

=== 50s ===
The years during and following the revolution, despite being ones in which contemplation of literature and theory are typically overruled by practical and physical response, were a time of extreme significance for the magazine. Though other official periodicals would appear in later years, People's Literature would act as the “battle front from where literary and arts policies were announced, literary campaigns were promoted”. For the party's leadership, literature and literary criticism was of the utmost importance, the “barometer of class struggle” according to Zhou Yang. In Mao Tse-Tung's own words, “One of the most important methods of struggle in the world of literature and the arts is literary criticism” — People's Literature would act as the vessel within which this struggle could take place, from which counter-revolutionary, rightist, and conservative literatures could be combated. In 1952, the magazine compiled and republished a collection of Chinas’ most significant classical works, including Water Margins, Romance of the Three Kingdoms, Dream of the Red Chamber, Journey to the West, Unofficial History of the Literati, Notes on Strange Matters from Idleness Studio, The Story of the Western Chamber and the complete or selected works of various poets.

However, the magazine did not exist solely as a tool of the state in the fifties, in fact, during the Hundred Flowers period it acted as a vanguard of independent and pluralist thought, with works such as The Newcomer In The Organisation Department by Wang Meng, published by People's Literature in September 1956, criticising the distinction between an individual's ideals and reality in society, telling the story of an outsider who is unable to fit in a new environment. Despite this brief pluralism in the magazine's publishing, the Anti-Rightist movement of the late fifties prompted a return to an ideological orientation of orthodox Maoism.

=== 60s ===
Following this return to orthodoxy which coincides with the Anti-Rightist Campaign and eventually the Cultural Revolution of the sixties, People's Literature became decreasingly significant in the wider Chinese literary community as the publication Liberation Army Literature & Arts, more closely tied to the party, took its place as the main literary outlet of the state. In 1965 Mao Dun (still then editor in chief of the magazine) was stood down from his other position as Minister of Culture for ideological issues, and in July, 1966, along with almost all other literary magazines in the country, People's Literature ceased publication.

=== 70s and 80s ===
The magazine resumed publication in 1976 — interestingly, this occurred early in the year, prior to Mao's death, the event typically used to denote the Cultural Revolutions end. Though the magazines life in the early 70s was one of absolute repression, the following two decades were characterised by critical reflection and economic prosperity. As one of the leading literary magazines at the time, People's Literature saw to the publication and popularisation of ‘Scar Literature’ such as The Class Monitor and Wrongly Cut, which sought to portray the suffering and despair under the Cultural Revolution and the Gang of Four, who were at the time on trial. In this period Wang Meng, who was condemned and persecuted as a Rightist following his activity in the Hundred Flowers period was appointed as editor-in-chief of People's Literature, and later as Minister of Culture.

Alongside this blooming literary genre, literary magazines and literature more broadly began to be viewed differently, no longer as a “spiritual product” which maintained “a strict boundary between literature and commodities.” In this coming period, as political pressure was loosened (but not fully alleviated) and the Chinese economy was liberalised by reformist Deng Xiaoping, leading to an extremely profitable and popular era for People's Literature.

=== 90s and Onward ===
The magazine reached its height of popularity between the periods of cultural revolution and market liberalisation from the mid 70s to 90s, in which it was challenged by neither scrutiny from political forces nor a more competitive international marketplace. Readership dropped significantly following the opening of the international marketplace and the loss of state-funding, falling from 1.32 million copies in circulation in 1980, to 50,000 in 1999.

== Editorial Stance ==
A publication formed and funded by the newly emerging People's Republic of China, People's Literature played a significant political and cultural role in the emerging communist state. In July 1949, editor-in-chief Mao Dun stated his philosophy of writing in this new era -— “First, the workers, peasants, and soldiers should be depicted as main protagonists”; and “second, to affirm that the workers, peasants, and soldiers are the creators of this great era.” While not in direct control of the Chinese state, the Chinese Writers Association, which issues the magazine, falls into a subdivision of the Chinese Communist Party's United Front system. The paper precedes the united front by a few months, however its editors were selected so as to reflect similar interests as the Chinese Communist Party; editors Mao Dun and Ai Qing both being prominent left wing writers and members of the party. However, the magazine was not subject to serious political censorship until the onset of the cultural revolution; during the period between 1966 and 1976, People's Literature, along with almost all other literary journals in China stopped publishing. Though censorship of literature (in particular foreign literature) in China was, and continues to be a significant issue, western works such as Great Expectations and Hard Times have been published as early as the 70s in People's Literature, due to their evident anti-capitalist messages and praise by various marxists, including Karl Marx and Friedrich Engels.

== Form ==
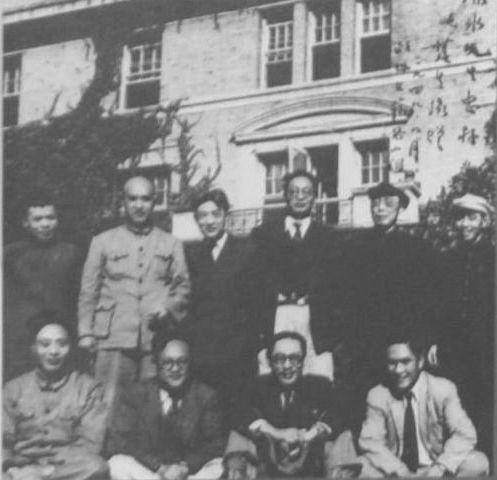
The First Plenary Meeting of the People's PCC (Ai Qing front left, Mao Dun back right).

=== Influences ===
The creation of People's Literature sought to express a radical break from the traditionalist Confucian system into modernist ways of thinking about literature that would constitute the new Chinese literary system; yet it also sought to ensure that "the new literature be accessible to the majority of people in China, not simply the intellectual elite". The magazine would draw directly from May Fourth Movement literature in it’\s focus on revolutionary and modernist literature, Mao Dun being its first editor, a significant figure in the movement, regarded as "central to the project" of its canonisation.

=== Style ===
The magazine encompasses all forms of Chinese literature and culture from across the country, including forms and genres such as rural folk literature, urban middle-brow literature, and modern, Marxist popular literature. Along with many newly created institutions in communist China, People's Literature had the aim of modernisation, so while it aimed to publish a diverse display of Chinese literature, its focus was primarily modernist texts. Throughout its existence People's Literature has been regarded as a prestigious top national journal, and unlike provincial-level journals, is distributed and consumed nationwide. The magazine is released on a monthly basis and contains poetry, prose, literary criticism, novellas, and novels.

== Finance ==
In the wake of China's financial liberalisation, People's Literature shifted in 1999 from a state-funded magazine, gradually to a financially independent institution. This in combination with a turn from the Chinese socialist literary system to a wider cultural market dealt a major blow to many literary journals in China; however, due to its prestige, wide readership (pertaining over a million subscribers as of the early 80s) and larger significance in Chinese history, People's Literature has been able to remain publishing.

== Criticism ==
Throughout its publication history, People's Literature has come under various criticisms, both political and literary.

=== Rewriting ===
One critique of the magazine targets how it has rewritten texts predating the People's Republic of China to better represent the political ambitions of the new state. Republished editions by the newly founded magazine saw significant works of Chinese literature such as Family, Midnight, and Village in August all going through a rigorous process of rewriting, in the case of Family accumulating up to 14,000 textual changes.

=== Political Repression ===
Like many Chinese cultural institutions, People's Literature has been criticised for acting not so much as a genuine literary magazine but as an ideological tool of the state via self and state censorship. However this claim has been disputed by other academics in the field of Chinese literature, who highlight times the magazine has been critical of the Chinese revolution's legacy.

=== Lack of State Funding ===
As the publication was weaned off of state-funding to eventually become financially independent, criticisms were made of its declining literary quality: such arguments maintained that with the newly important financial incentive the magazine would lose focus on the quality of its content and instead privilege sponsorships and the publishing of promotional pieces.

== Foreign language editions ==
In November 2011 the magazine started its English version, named Pathlight. Later the magazine expanded its multilingual editions, including French and Japanese. The latter edition was launched in 2015 and is named Tomoshibi. It is published annually. The French edition of People's Literature, published annually, was also started in 2015.

== Awards ==
The People's Literature Awards (Renmin wenxue jiang 人民文学奖) are annual awards for the most outstanding works published each year. The awards were introduced in 1986, and include the categories of novel, novella, short story, essay, non-fiction, poetry, translation. In 2003 the name was changed to the Maotai Cup People's Literature Awards (Maotai bei renmin wenxue jiang 茅台杯人民文学奖). One to three prizes are given for each category, with each winner awarded 10,000 RMB.

== See also ==
- Chinese Literature
- People's Literature Publishing House
- China Writers Association
- Mao Dun
