= Minister of Culture and Tourism (China) =

Minister of the People's Republic of China

Minister of Culture and Tourism of the People's Republic of China
- 中华人民共和国文化和旅游部部长
- National Emblem of China

- Flag of China

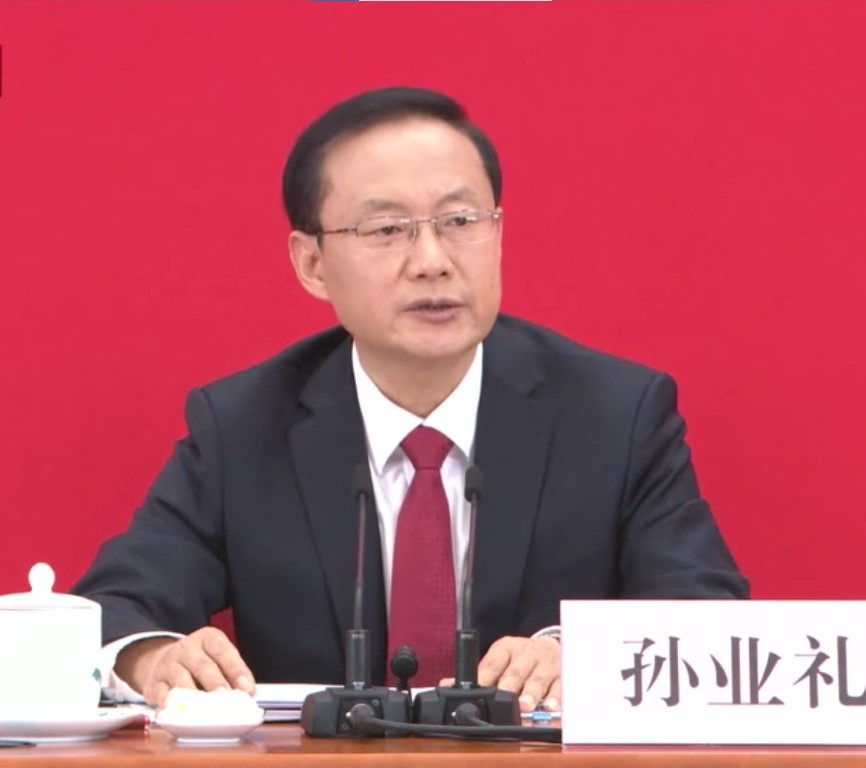
- Incumbent; Sun Yeli since 29 December 2023
- Ministry of Culture and Tourism
- Status: Provincial and ministerial-level official
- Member of: Plenary Meeting of the State Council
- Seat: Ministry of Culture and Tourism Building, Dongcheng District, Beijing
- Nominator: Premier (chosen within the Chinese Communist Party)
- Appointer: President with the confirmation of the National People's Congress or its Standing Committee
- Formation: 19 March 2018; 8 years ago
- First holder: Luo Shugang
- Deputy: Vice Minister of Culture and Tourism

The minister of culture and tourism of the People's Republic of China is the head of the Ministry of Culture and Tourism of the People's Republic of China and a member of the State Council. Within the State Council, the position is twenty-first in order of precedence. The minister is responsible for leading the ministry, presiding over its meetings, and signing important documents related to the ministry. Officially, the minister is nominated by the premier of the State Council, who is then approved by the National People's Congress or its Standing Committee and appointed by the president.

The current minister is Sun Yeli, who concurrently serves as the Chinese Communist Party Committee Secretary of the ministry and the deputy head of the Publicity Department of the Chinese Communist Party.

== List of ministers ==
=== Minister of Culture ===
No.	Name	Took office	Left office
1	Shen Yanbing (better by the pen name Mao Dun)	October 1949	January 1965
2	Lu Dingyi	January 1965	June 1966
3	Xiao Wangdong (acting)	June 1966	January 1967
post abolished
−	Wu De (head of the Cultural Group of the State Council)	June 1970	January 1975
4	Yu Huiyong	January 1975	October 1976
5	Huang Zhen	December 1977	December 1980
6	Zhou Weizhi (acting)	December 1980	April 1982
7	Zhu Muzhi	April 1982	March 1986
8	Wang Meng	March 1986	September 1989
9	He Jingzhi	August 1989	November 1992
10	Liu Zhongde	November 1992	March 1998
11	Sun Jiazheng	March 1998	March 2008
12	Cai Wu	March 2008	December 2014
13	Luo Shugang	December 2014	March 2018

=== Minister of Culture and Tourism ===
No.	Name	Took office	Left office	Ref.
1	Luo Shugang	19 March 2018	11 August 2020	
2	Hu Heping	11 August 2020	29 December 2023	
3	Sun Yeli	29 December 2023	Incumbent	
