= He Jingzhi =

Chinese politician and poet

- 贺敬之

Standing Committee Member of the 8th Chinese People's Political Consultative Conference
- In office March 1993 – March 1998
- Chairman: Li Ruihuan

Standing Committee Member of the 7th National People's Congress
- In office 1988–1993
- Chairman: Wan Li

Member of the 12th and 13th CCP Central Committee
- In office September 1982 – 1987
- General_secretary: Hu Yaobang

Minister of Culture
- In office 1989–1992
- Premier: Li Peng
- Preceded by: Wang Meng
- Succeeded by: Liu Zhongde

Deputy Head of the Propaganda Department of the Chinese Communist Party
- In office 1980–1987

Vice Minister of Culture
- In office 1977 – August 1980
- Premier: Hua Guofeng
- Minister: Huang Zhen

Personal details
- Born: 5 November 1924 (age 101) Yi County, Shandong, China
- Party: Chinese Communist Party
- Spouse: Ke Yan (m. 1953–2011)
- Education: Department of Literature of Luxun Art Academy of Yan'an
- Occupation: Politician, poet
- Profession: Chinese Literature

Chinese name
- Traditional Chinese: 賀敬之
- Simplified Chinese: 贺敬之
Transcriptions
Standard Mandarin
- Hanyu Pinyin: He Jingzhi

He Jingzhi (born 5 November 1924), also known by his pen names Aimo (艾漠) and Jingzhi (荆直), is a politician and poet of People's Republic of China. He was a standing committee member of the 8th Chinese People's Political Consultative Conference, a standing committee member of the 7th National People's Congress, and a member of the 12th and 13th CCP Central Committee. He served as Minister of Culture of the People'e Republic of China and deputy head of the Propaganda Department of the Chinese Communist Party.

== Biography ==
He was born in Yi County, Shandong Province, Republic of China on November 5, 1924. He went to Yan'an in 1940, he graduated from Department of Literature of Luxun Art Academy of Yan'an in 1942, where he majored in Chinese Literature. He joined the Chinese Communist Party in 1941, at the age of 17. He continued writing from the 1940s, such as Collection of Fangge (放歌集), Selected of He Jingzhi Poetry (贺敬之诗选), Return to Yan'an (回延安), Song of Leifeng (雷锋之歌) and China's October (中国的十月). Return to Yan'an is often considered his masterpiece and was included in many editions of school text books. He wrote The White Haired Girl (白毛女) with Ding Yi in 1945.

== Personal life ==
He married Ke Yan (Chinese: 柯岩; pinyin: Kē Yán; 1924-2011) in October 1953, who was also a poet.

== Works ==
- Collection of Fangge (放歌集)
- Selected of He Jingzhi Poetry (贺敬之诗选)
- Return to Yan'an (回延安)
- Song of Leifeng (雷锋之歌)
- China's October (中国的十月)
- The White Haired Girl (白毛女)

Government offices
Preceded by Wang Meng	Minister of Culture; 1992–1992	Succeeded by Liu Zhongde
