= China Foundation for Human Rights Development =

Chinese Communist Party body

- 中国人权发展基金会
- Formation: August 15, 1994; 32 years ago
- Headquarters: Beijing
- Region served: China
- Parent organization: Publicity Department of the Chinese Communist Party; State Council Information Office
- Affiliations: China Society for Human Rights Studies
- Website: renquanjjh.com

The China Foundation for Human Rights Development (CFHRD) is a social organization in China under the supervision of the Publicity Department of the Chinese Communist Party (State Council Information Office).

== History ==
The CFHRD was established on 15 August 1994. When the first council meeting of the foundation was held, it received an inscription from Premier Li Peng, as well as telephone congratulations from Qiao Shi, the Chairman of the Standing Committee of the National People's Congress, and Zhu Rongji, the Vice Premier of the State Council.

== Functions ==
The foundation has always been the only human rights foundation in the People's Republic of China. It is directly operated by the Publicity Department of the CCP and the State Council Information Office. According to the foundation's charter, the foundation's official purpose is to be guided by Deng Xiaoping Theory, the Three Represents and the Scientific Outlook on Development, implement "the spirit of General Secretary Xi Jinping's series of important speeches and the CCP Central Committee's "new concepts, new ideas and new strategies" for governing the country, abide by the constitutional principle that "the state respects and protects human rights", promote the development and progress of China's human rights cause, strengthen exchanges and cooperation in the international human rights field, and promote the cause of human rights progress in the world. It is the primary funder of the China Society for Human Rights Studies.

== See also ==
- Human rights in China
