= Lu Dingyi =

Chinese politician (1906–1996)

- 陆定一
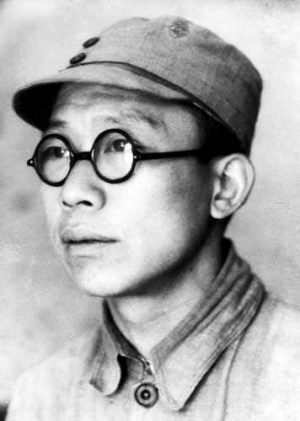
- Lu Dingyi in 1942

Vice Premier of China
- In office April 1959 – May 1966
- Premier: Zhou Enlai
- Vice Premier: Chen Yun; Lin Biao

Minister of Culture
- In office February 1965 – May 1966
- Premier: Zhou Enlai
- Preceded by: Shen Yanbing
- Succeeded by: Xiao Wangdong

Head of the Publicity Department of the Chinese Communist Party
- In office December 1944 – 1952
- Leader: Zhang Wentian; Mao Zedong
- Preceded by: Zhang Wentian
- Succeeded by: Xi Zhongxun
- In office July 1954 – December 1966
- Leader: Mao Zedong (Chairman)
- Preceded by: Xi Zhongxun
- Succeeded by: Tao Zhu

Personal details
- Born: 9 June 1906 Wuxi, Jiangsu, Qing Empire
- Died: 9 May 1996 (aged 89) Beijing, People's Republic of China
- Party: Chinese Communist Party
- Education: Nanyang Public School

Chinese name
- Simplified Chinese: 陆定一
- Traditional Chinese: 陸定一
Transcriptions
Standard Mandarin
- Hanyu Pinyin: Lù Dìngyī
- Wade–Giles: Lu^{4} Ting^{4}-i^{1}
other Mandarin
- Xiao'erjing: لُو دېڭيِي

Lu Dingyi (Chinese: 陆定一; pinyin: Lù Dìngyī; June 9, 1906 – May 9, 1996) was a leader of the Chinese Communist Party. After the establishment of the People's Republic of China and before the Cultural Revolution, he was credited as one of the top officials in socialist culture.

== Biography ==
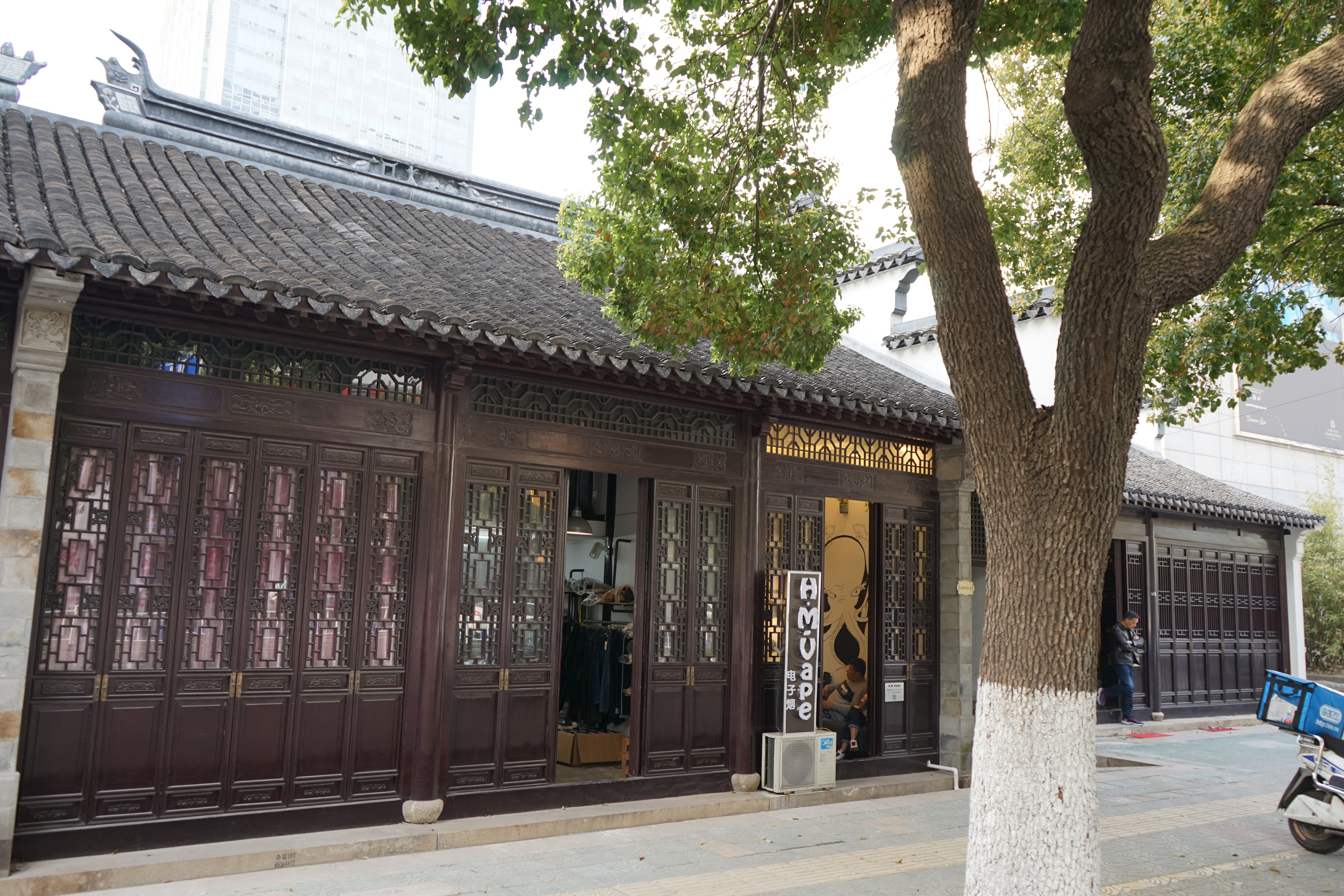
Former residence of Lu Dingyi in Wuxi. The house was bought by Lu's grandfather in late Guangxu period.

Lu Dingyi joined the Chinese Communist Party in 1925, while he was studying electrical engineering at the Nanyang Public School. After graduation, he fully joined revolutionary activities, being mainly involved in the Communist Youth League, writing articles for its newspaper Chinese Youth (later renamed Proletarian Youth and then Leninist Youth). In 1927 he took part at both the 5th CCP National Congress and the CYL Congress, being elected a member of the CYL Central Committee working with its Propaganda Department. He was actively involved in countering Chiang Kai-shek's anti-communist coup, organizing communist unities in Guangdong. In 1928 Lu Dingyi took part at the 6th CCP National Congress and the CYL Congress, both of which were held in Moscow, remaining in the Soviet Union until 1930 as a junior representative of the CYL to the Comintern.

Lu Dingyi then returned in China. He was a member of the CCP Propaganda Department starting from 1934. He participated in the Long March, during which he was editor of the Red Star newspaper. Also during the Long March, he was the head of the Propaganda Department of the Eighth Route Army. Later, he was the head of the Eighth Route Army's Political Department. In 1942, Lu was promoted to chief editor of the Liberation Daily after his predecessor Yang Song fell ill. During his editorial tenure, the newspaper increased its focus on promulgating Communist Party policies. Because the party relied on grassroots cadre to communicate its messages to the masses at a time when literacy was still limited, the newspaper used simple and direct language. In an effort to give clear instruction, it typically published a piece of reporting side-by-side with an instructive editorial. Seeking to implement principles of the mass line, the newspaper dispatched reporters to collect news stories from villagers and sought contributions from local cultural workers. Circulation methods included village newspaper reading groups, community blackboards and bulletin boards, night study groups, and public meetings. Lu established the requirement that the paper's content had to be approved by Party Central. During Lu's tenure, the paper became more aligned with those who supported Mao's leadership, and less with the Soviet-leaning members of party leadership. During the Yan'an Rectification Movement, Lu Dingyi wrote Our basic view for journalism, which was considered the basis for Chinese communist journalism. In 1943 he was appointed head of the CCP Central Propaganda Department, a post he held until 1952 and then again from 1954. He was elected CCP Central Committee member in 1945. The Communist Party's first mass campaign against superstition occurred in Yan'an in 1944 and 1945. The campaign sought to eliminate shamanic ritual practices, reform shamans into productive workers, and to promote public health and hygiene. During this campaign, Lu dispatched Liberation Daily journalists to cover the trials of shamans and called on doctors of traditional Chinese medicine, doctors of Western medicine, schoolteachers, and other educated individuals to help promote modern medicine among the people and to encourage them to avoid shamanic practices. A political commissar in the PLA, Lu Dingyi gave important contributions to the revolutionary struggle in Shaanxi along with other top leaders like Mao Zedong, Zhou Enlai and Ren Bishi, according to his official biography. After the establishment of the People's Republic of China, Lu Dingyi was deputy chairman of the Culture and Education Committee of the Central People's Government from 1949 and member of the Standing Committee of the National People's Congress from 1954. At the 8th Party Congress in 1956, he was re-elected a CCP Central Committee member and promoted to Politburo alternate member, concurrently serving as secretary of the CCP Secretariat from 1962. In 1957 and 1960, he accompanied major Party leaders Mao Zedong, Liu Shaoqi and Deng Xiaoping to international meetings of communist parties held in Moscow. His main political activity was in the cultural front, as he directed cultural criticism campaigns.

On 27 April 1956, at an enlarged meeting of the Politburo, Lu argued that scholarship and the arts should be allowed to develop through free debate rather than administrative fiat; Mao endorsed the proposal in his summing-up the next day, and Chen Boda suggested the slogan by which it became known. On 26 May 1956 Lu delivered the report "Let a hundred flowers bloom, let a hundred schools of thought contend" at Huairen Hall in Zhongnanhai to an audience of natural scientists, social scientists, physicians, writers and artists. He called for academic and technical questions to be kept strictly separate from political ones, for scholars not to be labelled politically for their views, and for freedom of independent thinking, of debate, of creation and criticism, and to express, maintain and reserve one's own opinions. In 1958 he promoted the founding of the first rural vocational secondary school in the People's Republic, in Hai'an, Jiangsu.

His record on intellectuals was nonetheless uneven. At the 1962 Guangzhou conference, when Zhou Enlai and Chen Yi proposed that the great majority of intellectuals should no longer be labelled "bourgeois intellectuals", Lu objected, arguing that nothing had changed and that the label should stand; Mao adopted Lu's position.

In June 1958, Mao changed the party and government structure by establishing groups in charge of finance, legal matters, foreign affairs, science, and culture and education which bypassed the State Council. Lu was made the head of the culture and education group. In 1959 he was appointed a Vice Premier of the State Council, and Minister of Culture in 1965. Lu was criticised and persecuted during the Cultural Revolution. Shortly after the Cultural Revolution broke out, Lu was accused of being a promoter of the reactionary line in culture, since he did not adhere to Mao Zedong's idea that culture should extensively serve proletarian politics. In May 1966 he was accused of being part of the "Peng-Luo-Lu-Yang anti-Party clique" (the others being Peng Zhen, Luo Ruiqing and Yang Shangkun) and dismissed. He was also criticised for his activity in the Five Man Group, a Central Committee agency in charge of leading the first stages of the Cultural Revolution led by Peng Zhen, another purged official. He was detained for nearly 13 years.

Lu had been appointed deputy head of the Five Man Group under Peng Zhen in July 1964. In February 1966 the group produced the so-called February Outline, which explicitly opposed treating academic disputes as questions of political line; three months later the May 16 Notification repudiated the Outline and dissolved the group. In March 1966 Mao had described the Propaganda Department as a "palace of the King of Hell" that should be overthrown. At the enlarged Politburo meeting held from 4 to 26 May 1966 Lu was criticised and suspended from his posts as secretary of the Secretariat and head of the Propaganda Department; after the meeting Lin Biao confronted him over the dozens of anonymous letters his wife Yan Weibing had sent to Lin's wife Ye Qun and their children between 1960 and 1966, telling him he would have liked to shoot him. On 30 September 1966 a decision placing him under "isolation for reflection" was formally announced, and in late April 1968 he was transferred to Qincheng Prison.

According to his eldest son Lu De, Lu Dingyi was held in solitary confinement in a cell of about six square metres and was identified by the number 68164 in place of his name, the digits denoting the year of his imprisonment, his prisoner category and his serial number. Although relatives of many detained officials were later permitted regular visits, the family did not see him once in thirteen years, because he consistently refused to confess to the charges or to implicate others and was therefore recorded as having a "bad attitude". He Fangba, procurator-general of the Beijing Municipal People's Procuratorate and a juror at the trial of the Gang of Four, later told Lu De that of all the interrogation files of detained central leaders he had read, Lu Dingyi's stood out: an intellectual who had been strung up and beaten and had still not given way.

The special case group extended the investigation to Lu's relatives regardless of whether any accusation lay against them, and as many as 63 were detained. Yan Weibing was kept in behind-the-back handcuffs for more than five years, which she was not allowed to remove to eat or sleep. Lu De, named personally by Jiang Qing, was taken from Tsinghua University to the Ministry of Public Security and spent six years in custody, during which he was beaten for refusing to denounce his father. Lu's mother-in-law Guo Ying and a brother-in-law died under investigation, a witness who declined to give false testimony was beaten to death by the case group, and one vice-minister took his own life.

In 1975 Central Committee Document No. 25 described Lu as a "class alien, anti-Party element and suspected traitor" and expelled him from the party "permanently"; the document, circulated nationally, also provided for his release to his native place on a monthly allowance of 200 yuan. Lu refused to accept the three charges and was consequently not released. At the end of 1976 he was moved to the prison ward of Fuxing Hospital for treatment. The Central Committee formally rehabilitated him on 8 June 1979.

Lu Dingyi was rehabilitated by the new leadership headed by Deng Xiaoping. His case was among the 445 cases reviewed directly by the Organizational Department over 1979-1980. In 1979 he was co-opted in the Fifth CPPCC National Committee as its vice-chairman; in the same year, he was co-opted in the CCP Central Committee as a consultant to the Propaganda Department. He was later a member of the Central Advisory Commission. Lu opposed the 1989 Tiananmen Square protests, contending that the students were "arrogant" and that it was necessary to think about the "negative side effects." In 1990, he contended that the turmoil in Eastern Europe demonstrated that had the protestors in Tiananmen Square not been suppressed, they would have implemented "another Cultural Revolution."

After his return to office Lu's positions on ideological questions contrasted sharply with his role under Mao, and overseas commentary at times described him as a reformer within the party. In 1986, writing to mark the thirtieth anniversary of the Hundred Flowers policy, he restated that questions of scholarship and art should be settled by free discussion rather than political means, citing the adoption of Li Siguang's geological theories and the rejection of Ma Yinchu's views on population as contrasting examples.

At the Sixth Plenum of the 12th Central Committee on 28 September 1986, before the vote on the resolution on the building of a socialist spiritual civilisation, Lu, then a member of the Standing Committee of the Central Advisory Commission, objected to the phrase "bourgeois liberalization" in the draft and proposed deleting it. Wan Li and others agreed, while Yang Shangkun, Bo Yibo and Yu Qiuli opposed deletion and Hu Yaobang took a conciliatory line. Deng Xiaoping then spoke, saying that opposition to bourgeois liberalization was the point he had made most often and insisted on most firmly, and the phrase was retained.

Lu Dingyi died in Beijing in 1996, several years after his retirement. He was hailed as an outstanding Party member and promoter of socialist culture. Lu's knowledge of the English language also allowed him to translate the conversations between Mao Zedong and Anna Louise Strong. He is often credited with helping to coin the English phrase "paper tiger". While translating for Mao, Lu initially translated "paper tiger" as "scarecrow" in an attempt to use a cultural reference point an American would understand. Mao realized something had been lost in translation, and asked the translator what a scarecrow was. On hearing the answer, Mao rejected the term, switching to his heavily accented English to clarify that he meant a "paper tiger". Though Anna Louise Strong identifies the translator as Lu Dingyi in her 1948 memoir Tomorrow's China, some other sources instead identify Yu Guangsheng as the translator.

== Reflections in later life ==
In his last years Lu reviewed both the propaganda work he had long directed and the party's experience in building socialism. His eldest son Lu De compiled part of his talks and conversations into an essay in ten parts, five of which were published by Yanhuang Chunqiu in 2007. In the same year the Beijing Daily, the organ of the Beijing municipal party committee, reprinted the passages on supervision by public opinion, which attracted attention outside China.

On his own record, Lu said that history was not made by one man alone; that during his long tenure as head of the Propaganda Department his work had involved one campaign of criticism after another without pause; that much of this had been done at Mao's instruction and carried out by him, while some he had initiated himself, and that he took full responsibility for it. He also acknowledged having been guilty of a personality cult towards Mao. On the handling of party history he distinguished two levels: for organisational decisions he accepted the leadership's principle of painting in broad strokes, but for the analysis of historical lessons he argued for the opposite, since the purpose of drawing lessons was to avoid repeating mistakes. From the Anti-Rightist Campaign and the Great Leap Forward to the Cultural Revolution, he said, analyses of one-man rule had repeatedly stopped short of identifying its roots in surviving feudal despotism, and the error had therefore recurred.

Lu was sharply critical of the doctrine that journalism should serve politics, which Lu De reported him as calling a form of deceiving superiors and subordinates alike and of telling lies. On the Hundred Flowers policy he came to hold that it should be interpreted through a dualism of "social attributes" and "natural attributes" rather than through the monism of class struggle: science, technology and the arts serve society, but must also conform to objective laws, and the latter aspect is primary and cannot be negated on ideological grounds. Mao's later reduction of the "hundred schools" to two, proletarian and bourgeois, had turned scholarly dispute into class struggle. Lu said that during his thirteen years in detention he had reflected repeatedly on the criticism directed at his 1956 report, and that unless these questions and the class categorisation of intellectuals were clarified, a further movement of the same kind could break out at the first disturbance. He accepted that his own view of intellectuals had been too far to the left and credited Zhou Enlai's standard of political conduct, rather than world outlook, with correcting him.

He also argued that once power had been won by revolution and the exploiting classes eliminated, the party's internal problems could no longer be addressed by revolutionary or violent means, that the functions of the dictatorship should increasingly be directed outwards, and that internally the answer lay in socialist democracy and legality — the Cultural Revolution being, in his words, precisely such a lesson. On corruption he held that self-discipline alone could not suffice, since the anti-corruption apparatus was itself under party leadership and no remedy existed if the leader himself were corrupt, a problem Lenin had never solved; borrowing from management theory, he said that acting as both player and referee produced a functional deficit, and that adjudication and supervision should be placed outside the party, supplemented by popular and press supervision, with the public judging the results. Complaints should be channelled rather than dammed. On freedom, he maintained that human emancipation was part of the core value of the communist movement and that Marx's association of free individuals was a sublation rather than a rejection of liberalism, so that liberty, equality and fraternity were not the exclusive property of the bourgeoisie; he added that while he understood liberalism, he did not understand "bourgeois liberalization", a term he said had no definition in the Marxist–Leninist classics.

According to Lu De, when Lu Dingyi was dying in early May 1996, the family heard him say, haltingly, that all children must be allowed to go to school and the people must be allowed to speak. He died at 5:45 am on 9 May.

== Personal life ==
Lu's father, Lu Chengzhou, was a lawyer and later a judge. Lu's first wife was Tang Yizhen (1909–1935) of Wuchang, who joined the Communist Youth League in 1926, studied at Sun Yat-sen University in Moscow and married Lu there in 1929. She headed a Red Army medical supplies factory and the materials bureau of the Central Military Commission's health department, and was left behind in the Soviet area in October 1934 because she was close to giving birth. She was captured by Nationalist troops in January 1935 near Sidu, Changting, and killed on 31 January at the age of 25. Their two children, Ye Ping (born 1931) and Fan Jiading (born November 1934), were left with foster families; Fan Jiading was reunited with his father in September 1980 and took the name Lu Fan Jiading. Both were reunited with Lu only after 1979, and members of Lu's second family later publicly disputed their identity.

In August 1941, on an introduction from Chen Yun, Lu married Yan Weibing (1918–1986), a writer from Wuxi who had gone to Yan'an in 1937 and who later worked in the Propaganda Department. She was the author of the anonymous letters to Ye Qun that helped precipitate Lu's fall, and was imprisoned during the Cultural Revolution. Their children are Lu De (born 1942), later deputy head of the China Defence Science and Technology Institute, Lu Jianjian, and Lu Ruijun.

Yan Weibing's father, Yan Pu(1898–1949), was also an early Communist cadre, and the two families were connected through the revolution. Born into a wealthy Wuxi household and known locally as "the third young master", Yan joined the party in 1925, sold his landholdings to found a middle school in Wuxi and distributed his family's fields to peasants, and took part in the labour and peasant movements; Chen Yun's obituary tribute made his ruin of his own family fortune for the revolution proverbial. After the April 12 coup he led armed peasant struggles in southern Jiangsu and southern Zhejiang, became deputy head of the national economy ministry of the Chinese Soviet Republic's provisional central government in February 1934, joined the Long March in ill health, and later travelled to the Soviet Union. He returned to China in 1938, served in the northeast after the Japanese surrender, and was head of the civil affairs department of the Heilongjiang provincial government in 1946–1947; he died in Beiping on 5 June 1949. His wife Guo Ying died during the Cultural Revolution as a result of the case against Yan Weibing.

== Selected works ==
- "Laoshanjie" (老山界, 1934), an account of the Red Army's crossing of the Laoshan Pass in Guangxi during the Long March, included in Recollections of the Long March and, since 2016, in the standard mainland Chinese junior secondary school Chinese-language textbook.
- Mingbian Laohua (茗边老话), Guangming Daily Press, 1985.
- Selected Journalism of Lu Dingyi (陆定一新闻文选), Xinhua Publishing House, 1987.
- Collected Works of Lu Dingyi (陆定一文集), 2 vols., People's Publishing House, 1992.

Government offices
Preceded by Mao Dun	Minister of Culture of China; 1965–1966	Succeeded by Xiao Wangdong
Party political offices
Preceded by Zhang Wentian	Head of the CCP Central Propaganda Department; 1943–1952	Succeeded by Xi Zhongxun
Preceded by Xi Zhongxun	Head of the CCP Central Propaganda Department; 1954–1966	Succeeded by Tao Zhu
