= Yan Weibing =

Chinese writer and Communist Party official (1918–1986)

- 严慰冰
- Born: 1918; Wuxi, Jiangsu, China
- Died: 15 March 1986; Beijing, China
- Occupations: Writer, party official
- Political party: Chinese Communist Party
- Spouse: Lu Dingyi (m. 1941)
- Children: 3

Chinese name
- Traditional Chinese: 嚴慰冰
- Simplified Chinese: 严慰冰
Transcriptions
Standard Mandarin
- Hanyu Pinyin: Yán Wèibīng

Yan Weibing (simplified Chinese: 严慰冰; traditional Chinese: 嚴慰冰; pinyin: Yán Wèibīng; 1918 – 15 March 1986) was a Chinese writer and Communist Party official, and the second wife of Lu Dingyi, head of the party's Propaganda Department and a vice premier. She is chiefly remembered for the affair of the letters she sent under assumed names between 1960 and 1966 to Ye Qun, the wife of defence minister Lin Biao, attacking Lin and Ye. The case became entangled with the purge of her husband at the outset of the Cultural Revolution. Yan was arrested in April 1966, spent more than twelve years in custody, and was released and rehabilitated after 1978.

== Family background and early life ==
Yan Weibing was born in 1918 in Wuxi, Jiangsu, the eldest of the daughters of Yan Pu (1898–1949) and Guo Ying. Her father, born into a wealthy Wuxi household and known locally as "the third young master", joined the Communist Party in 1925, sold his landholdings to found a middle school in Wuxi and distributed his family's fields to peasants, and took part in the labour and peasant movements; Chen Yun, who wrote a memorial tribute after his death, made his ruin of his own fortune for the revolution proverbial. He became deputy head of the national economy ministry of the Chinese Soviet Republic's provisional central government in February 1934, joined the Long March, later studied in the Soviet Union, headed the civil affairs department of the Heilongjiang provincial government in 1946–1947, and died in Beiping in June 1949. Guo Ying died during the Cultural Revolution as a consequence of the case against her daughter. Yan Weibing's younger sister Yan Zhao was a foreign affairs secretary to Zhou Enlai and later worked for the Chinese People's Political Consultative Conference; she was the principal source for later accounts of her sister's life.

Yan was educated at Jinling Girls' Middle School and admitted to study Chinese literature at National Central University, and began publishing literary work in 1933. The outbreak of the Second Sino-Japanese War coincided with the start of her university course, and she left instead for the Communist base area at Yan'an.

== Career ==
In 1938 Yan studied at the Anti-Japanese Military and Political University in Yan'an and joined the Chinese Communist Party. She worked as a special correspondent for the magazine Chinese Women, was a student in the forty-fifth class of the Central Party School, and became a researcher in the journalism research office of the Yan'an Central Research Institute. In August 1941, on an introduction from Chen Yun, she married Lu Dingyi, whose first wife Tang Yizhen had been captured and killed by Nationalist troops in 1935.

After the establishment of the People's Republic of China she was an inspector of secondary schools for the Beijing Municipal Education Bureau, a postgraduate student in the Marxism–Leninism research class at Renmin University of China, a teacher in the Marxism–Leninism teaching and research office at Peking University, and deputy head of the education section of the party's Propaganda Department.

== The letters affair ==
Accounts of the origin of Yan's long-standing hostility towards Ye Qun differ. One version holds that Lu Dingyi had first courted Ye Qun and turned to Yan only after being refused, and that Yan resented it. Another traces it to a period in the 1940s when the two women were in hospital at the same time: conditions were harsh, but Ye Qun made many demands, on one occasion having a guard wade across a river in a rainstorm to bring her chicken soup, and Yan, who disapproved, mocked her in the hospital as a "fine lady".

Between 1960 and 1966 Yan sent nearly sixty letters to Ye Qun and her children attacking Ye Qun's private life, asserting that her children were not Lin Biao's, and suggesting pointedly that Ye Qun's daughter resembled the children of Liu Shaoqi, so setting Lin and Ye against their children. Through the pseudonyms she used and the return addresses she gave, she also sought to cast suspicion on Liu Shaoqi's wife Wang Guangmei. Lin Biao's family reported the letters; the case was solved in 1966 and escalated into a political matter. At the enlarged Politburo meeting held from 4 to 26 May 1966, Lin Biao publicly set out his family circumstances and rebutted Yan, and after the meeting told Lu Dingyi to his face that he would have liked to shoot him. Lu said that his wife had been mentally disturbed since 1952, suffering from delusions, and that he had known nothing of what she had done. The affair became one strand of the case against the so-called "Peng–Luo–Lu–Yang anti-party clique", the purge of Peng Zhen, Luo Ruiqing, Lu Dingyi and Yang Shangkun that immediately preceded the May 16 Notification; at the same meeting Lin submitted a written statement to the Politburo vouching for his wife's chastity and fidelity, described by historians Roderick MacFarquhar and Michael Schoenhals as among the strangest documents ever put before that body.

According to the writer Ye Yonglie, who interviewed Yan Zhao in 1988 and later re-examined the case, most of the letters were signed with a pseudonym, "Monte Cristo", an allusion to Alexandre Dumas's The Count of Monte Cristo. The Ministry of Public Security treated the matter as a priority case, code-named "Case 502". Its sixth bureau suspected Wang Guangmei and Shao Hua, Mao Zedong's daughter-in-law, in turn, but eliminated both by handwriting comparison; by March 1963 it had obtained Yan's personnel file from the Propaganda Department, matched the handwriting and established that she was the author, although no action was taken at the time. A quarrel between Yan and Ye Qun at a restricted-access store in Wangfujing in March 1966 has been described in a number of later publications as the breakthrough in the case, which Ye Yonglie regards as a misattribution.

=== Motives ===
According to her sister Yan Zhao, Yan Weibing was outspoken and unwilling to let a grievance pass, and her purpose in writing was to warn Lin Biao and Ye Qun that their conduct was known and that they could not count on impunity; her fault, Yan Zhao said, lay in not reporting the matter to the party under her own name. After her release Yan Weibing told her sister that a denunciation would have achieved nothing while Lin Biao was at the height of his power, that she had withheld her name for fear of implicating Lu Dingyi, and that she had kept her sister out of it because she was unwilling to involve anyone else, adding that whoever does a thing should answer for it alone.

In her own later account, Yan said she had known the risk, comparing what she was doing not to swatting a fly but to striking a tiger. She had hesitated: a petition to the Central Committee from a middle-ranking cadre, she reasoned, would have had no effect, and if it were suspected that her husband had put her up to it the consequences would fall on him and on the family; but she could not bring herself to swallow the matter. She therefore chose what she called an unsatisfactory expedient — writing under an assumed name and addressing the letters directly to Lin Biao, which she thought would avoid the charge of deliberate slander while making it clear to Lin and Ye that they could not conceal everything, and would leave her alone to bear the consequences if she were found out.

== Imprisonment and later life ==
On 28 April 1966 the special case group lured Yan from the family's home in Zhongnanhai and took her to a detention house on Lingjing Hutong; she is often described as the first person arrested as an "active counter-revolutionary" in the Cultural Revolution. After some months of interrogation she was transferred to Qincheng Prison in February 1967. Interrogators pressed her to admit that a line of doggerel in one of the letters, which turned on the character mao, had been aimed at Mao Zedong; she maintained that it had referred only to Lin Biao's baldness, and according to Yan Zhao she was beaten repeatedly over it.

Yan Zhao stated that her sister was held for thirteen years, that her hair was pulled out, that she was beaten until she lost her hearing and had teeth knocked out, that she came close to death in prison, and that she left it covered in injuries and seriously ill. A number of the family's relatives, and the doctors who had examined her, were also imprisoned in connection with the case. Her husband was held for thirteen years without seeing his family, and their son Lu De spent six years in custody.

Yan was released in December 1978, following the Third Plenum of the 11th Central Committee, and rehabilitated; her husband's rehabilitation followed in June 1979. In 1980 she was appointed a member of the committee on cultural and historical materials of the Chinese People's Political Consultative Conference, and in 1982 she joined the China Writers Association. She died in Beijing on 15 March 1986 at the age of 68.

== Family ==
Yan and Lu Dingyi had three children: Lu De (born 1942), later deputy head of the China Defence Science and Technology Institute; Lu Jianjian; and Lu Ruijun. Lu Dingyi's two children by Tang Yizhen, Ye Ping and Lu Fan Jiading, had been left with foster families during the Long March and were reunited with their father only after 1979; the circumstances of that separation, and the part played in it by Yan Weibing and her children, have been publicly disputed between the two branches of the family.
