= Luo Shugang =

Chinese politician

- 雒树刚
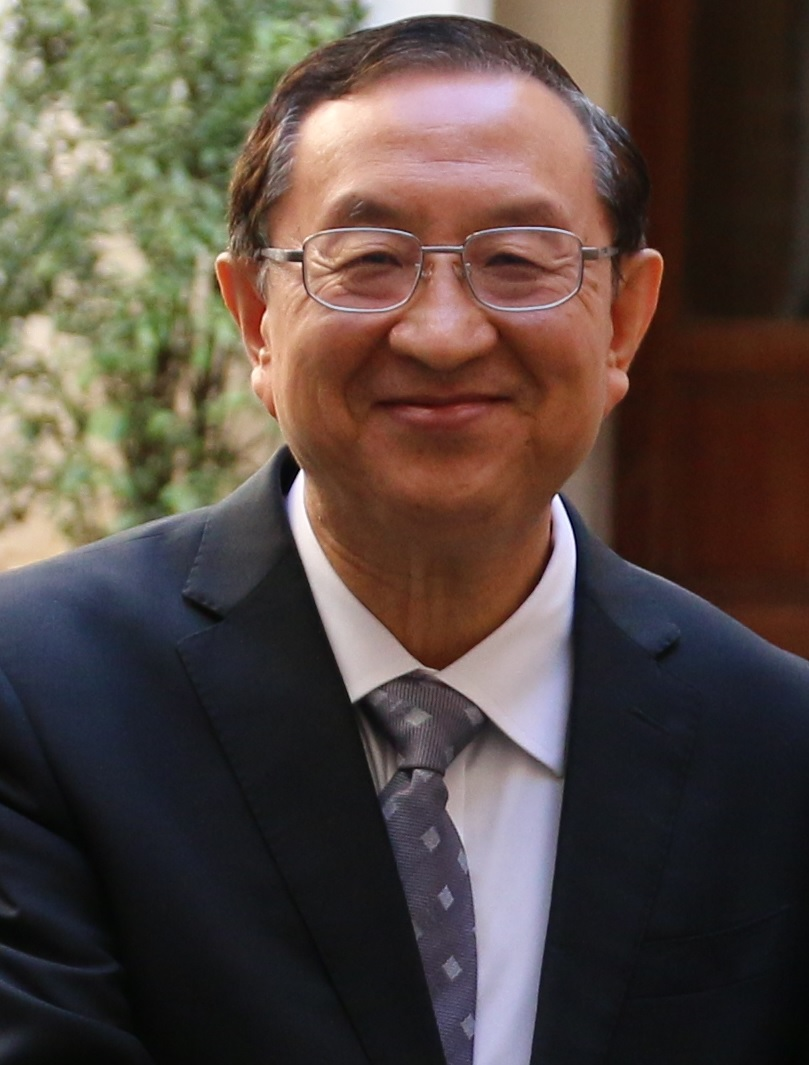
- Luo in 2019

Minister of Culture and Tourism
- In office 19 March 2018 – 11 August 2020
- Premier: Li Keqiang
- Preceded by: Himself (as the Minister of Culture)
- Succeeded by: Hu Heping

Minister of Culture
- In office 12 December 2014 – 19 March 2018
- Premier: Li Keqiang
- Preceded by: Cai Wu
- Succeeded by: Himself (as the Minister of Culture and Tourism)

Executive Deputy Head of the Publicity Department of the Chinese Communist Party
- In office June 2008 – December 2014
- Head: Liu Yunshan; Liu Qibao
- Preceded by: Ji Bingxuan
- Succeeded by: Huang Kunming

Personal details
- Born: May 27, 1955 (age 71) Nangong, Hebei, China
- Party: Chinese Communist Party
- Education: Central Party School

Luo Shugang (Chinese: 雒树刚; born 27 May 1955) is a Chinese politician. He has been the Minister of Culture since December 2014. He formerly served as executive deputy director of the Publicity Department of the Chinese Communist Party.

== Biography ==
Luo is a native of Nangong, Hebei province. He began working in February 1971, and joined the Chinese Communist Party (CCP) in September 1981. He has a master's degree from the Central Party School of the CPC. In August 2006, he was named chief of the Office of the Central Guidance Commission on Building Spiritual Civilization.

Luo is a full member of the 18th and 19th Central Committees of the Chinese Communist Party.

Government offices
Preceded by Cai Wu	Minister of Culture; 2014–2018	Post abolished
New title	Minister of Culture and Tourism; 2018– 2020	Succeeded by Hu Heping
Party political offices
Preceded by Ji Bingxuan	Executive Deputy Head of the Publicity Department of the Chinese Communist Party; 2008–2014	Succeeded by Huang Kunming
