= Xiao Wangdong =

Chinese general and Minister of Culture (1910–1989)

- 萧望东
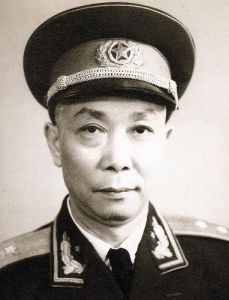

Minister of Culture
- In office 1966–1967
- Preceded by: Lu Dingyi
- Succeeded by: post abolished

Personal details
- Born: August 1910 Ji'an County, Jiangxi, China
- Died: 11 May 1989 (aged 78) Beijing
- Party: Chinese Communist Party
- Spouse: Xin Ping

Military service
- Allegiance: China
- Branch/service: People's Liberation Army
- Years of service: 1929−1982
- Rank: Lieutenant general

Xiao Wangdong (Chinese: 萧望东; Wade–Giles: Hsiao Wang-tung; August 1910 – 11 May 1989) was a Chinese Communist revolutionary and a lieutenant general of the People's Liberation Army (PLA). He briefly served as acting Minister of Culture of China at the beginning of the Cultural Revolution, before being persecuted and imprisoned for nine years.

== Early life and wartime career ==
Xiao Wangdong was born in August 1910 in Ji'an County, Jiangxi province. His original name was Xiao Huicun (萧惠存), and he also used the name Xiao Ke (萧克). He joined the Communist Youth League in November 1927. In July 1929, he joined the Chinese Communist Party (CCP) and the Red Army. In October 1934, he participated in the Long March, and reached northern Shaanxi a year later.

During the Second Sino-Japanese War, Xiao served as Director of the Political Department of the Fourth Division of the New Fourth Army, under commander Peng Xuefeng, and then the same position in the Second Division based in the Huai River region, under commander Luo Binghui. During the subsequent Chinese Civil War, he participated in several major battles in East China.

== People's Republic of China ==
From April 1949 to November 1952, Xiao Wangdong served as Chinese Communist Party Committee Secretary of Subei (northern Jiangsu) region, and political commissar of the Subei Military District, under commander Zhang Zhendong. From November 1952 to July 1953, he was Chinese Communist Party Deputy Committee Secretary of Jiangu province. From 1953 to 1965 he served in the East China Military Region, later Nanjing Military Region, as a political commissar. In September 1955, he was among the first group of PLA commanders to be awarded the rank of lieutenant general.

In April 1965, Xiao was appointed Vice Minister of Culture of China, under minister Lu Dingyi. After Lu Dingyi was purged at the beginning of the Cultural Revolution, Xiao became the acting minister in May 1966. Xiao brought colleagues from the military into the Ministry in an effort to restore order and invigorate the left. He lost his post when the Ministry dissolved.

Although Xiao was a military official, he followed Liu Shaoqi and attempted to limit the disruptions of the radical Red Guards. In February 1967 he was denounced as a counterrevolutionary and capitalist roader. He was purged and subsequently imprisoned for nine years. His superior Tao Zhu, who sought to protect him, was also purged.

Xiao was politically rehabilitated at the end of the Cultural Revolution and became Political Commissar of the Jinan Military Region from 1976 to 1982. He was also elected as an alternate member of the 11th Central Committee of the Chinese Communist Party (1977−82). He became a member of the Central Advisory Commission in 1982, and was re-elected in 1987.

Xiao Wangdong died in Beijing on 11 May 1989.

Political offices
Preceded by Lu Dingyi	Minister of Culture; 1966–1967	Succeeded by post abolished
