= Yu Huiyong =

Chinese politician (1925–1977)

Yu Huiyong (Chinese: 于会泳; pinyin: Yú Huìyǒng; Wade–Giles: Yu Hui-yung) (1925–1977) was a Chinese composer and politician of the Chinese Communist Party and the People's Republic of China, who served as Minister of Culture from 1975 to 1976. He is known for the art he made of Mao Zedong.

== Biography ==
Yu Huiyong was born in Haiyang County, Shandong Province in 1925. He was greatly interested in music and learned to play a variety of instruments such as the erhu, the sanxian, and the dizi. During the Second Sino-Japanese War, he joined a communist performance group, and in 1949 went to teach at the Shanghai Conservatory of Music (while simultaneously studying popular music), helping at turning a Western-oriented institution into a training ground for the communist art of the People's Republic of China. In the meantime, he joined the Chinese Communist Party. He graduated in 1950 but continued to work in the field of music.

In the same year, Yu Huiyong was transferred to the Research Institute on Ethnic Music, where he wrote many essays on music styles in China's provinces and took part in creating orchestral performances. In later years, he continued teaching and writing, publishing a comprehensive essay on China's folk music in 1959. In 1962 he was promoted to lecturer at the Shanghai Conservatory, and deputy director of its musical theory department the following year. In 1965 he was appointed member of the Drama Reform and Creative Group, and worked on musical embellishment of Taking Tiger Mountain by Strategy, one of the "eight model revolutionary theatrical works" re-elaborated by Jiang Qing.

In 1966, when the Cultural Revolution broke out, Yu Huiyong and many of the Shanghai Conservatory staff were targeted as bourgeois intellectuals and forced to resign, submit to self-criticism and criticism by students, and do physical labor. Yu Huiyong however took active part at the movement: he was called to Beijing to stage the "eight model revolutionary theatrical works", then returned to Shanghai where he joined the "rebel faction". In 1967 he was appointed vice-chairman of the Shanghai Conservatory Revolutionary Committee, chairman of the preparatory committee for the Shanghai Cultural Revolutionary Committee, and put in charge of the Shanghai Peking Opera Theatre. He worked directly under Zhang Chunqiao, one of the Gang of Four.

Taking an ever more prominent role, in 1968 Yu Huiyong chaired the criticism meeting against He Luting, president of the Shanghai Conservatory of Music. In 1969 he participated to the 9th National Congress of the Chinese Communist Party and was appointed standing committee member of the Shanghai Municipal Revolutionary Committee.

In 1970 Yu Huiyong was transferred to Beijing to become a member of the Cultural Group Under the State Council of the People's Republic of China chaired by Wu De. He was in charge of following movie transposition of model operas like The Legend of the Red Lantern, Red Detachment of Women, etc. In 1973 he was elected member of the Central Committee of the Chinese Communist Party at the 10th National Congress, and also appointed deputy head of the Cultural Group; later he was promoted to Minister of Culture in 1975 as the post was re-established by the 1st Session of the 4th National People's Congress.

In the last stages of the Cultura Revolution, Yu Huiyong oversaw art production and anti-revisionist works in China, as the film Chunmiao (Spring Sprout), which was criticized by Deng Xiaoping as "ultra-leftist". All of this led him to be accused of being part of the Gang of Four plot, aspiring to be a vice-premier and CCP Politburo member. He was arrested in 1976 and killed himself in 1977.

Political offices
Preceded by Wu De as Head of the State Council Cultural Group	Minister of Culture; 1975–1976	Succeeded by Huang Zhen; Vacant until 1977
