= Zhao Qizheng =

Chinese engineer and politician

- 赵启正

Director of the Foreign Affairs Committee of the National Committee of the Chinese People's Political Consultative Conference
- In office March 2008 – March 2013
- Preceded by: Liu Jianfeng
- Succeeded by: Pan Yunhe

Director of the State Council Information Office
- In office April 1998 – August 2005
- Preceded by: Zeng Jianhui
- Succeeded by: Cai Wu

Personal details
- Born: January 1940 (age 86) Beijing, China
- Party: Chinese Communist Party
- Education: University of Science and Technology of China

Chinese name
- Simplified Chinese: 赵启正
- Traditional Chinese: 趙啟正
Transcriptions
Standard Mandarin
- Hanyu Pinyin: Zhào Qǐzhèng

Zhao Qizheng (Chinese: 赵启正; born January 1940) is a retired Chinese engineer and politician. Previously he served as director of the State Council Information Office and director of the Foreign Affairs Committee of the National Committee of the Chinese People's Political Consultative Conference. He was a member of the 16th Central Committee of the Chinese Communist Party. He was a member of 10th National Committee of the Chinese People's Political Consultative Conference and a member of the 11th Standing Committee of the Chinese People's Political Consultative Conference.

== Biography ==
Zhao was born in Beijing in January 1940, while his ancestral home is in Zunhua, Hebei. His parents were professors of physics at Nankai University. He elementary studied at Tianjin Experimental Middle School and secondary studied at Tianjin Nankai High School. In September 1958, he was accepted to the University of Science and Technology of China, where he majored in nuclear physics.

After graduating in 1963, he was dispatched to the Second Research and Design Institute, Ministry of Nuclear Industry, as a technician. In January 1975, he was transferred to Shanghai Broadcast Equipment Factory, a factory under the jurisdiction of Ministry of Aerospace Industry, where he eventually was deputy director in December 1982.

He got involved in politics in May 1984, when he was appointed Chinese Communist Party Deputy Committee Secretary of the Industrial Working Committee of the Shanghai Municipal Committee of the Chinese Communist Party. In November 1984 he became deputy head of the Organization Department of municipal committee, rising to the head position in August 1986. Two months later, he was admitted to member of the standing committee of the Shanghai CCP committee, the city's top authority. He was vice mayor of Shanghai in June 1991, and held that office until January 1998. During his term in office, he was responsible for foreign affairs and foreign trade. He participated in the establishment the Pudong New Area of which he himself served as its first CCP committee secretary and governor.

In January 1998, he was transferred to Beijing and took office as deputy director of the State Council Information Office, three months later, he rose to become director. He was responsible for explaining national policy and social development of China to the media tinct through international cultural exchange. Due to his excellent performance, he was known as "public relations manager of the Chinese government". He served in the post until his retirement in August 2005.

In September 2006, he was hired as a doctoral supervisor and dean of the School of Journalism, Renmin University of China, he remained at the university until 2008.

In March 2008, he was elected a member of the 11th Standing Committee of the Chinese People's Political Consultative Conference, and became director of its Foreign Affairs Committee. In June 2008, he was employed as a doctoral supervisor and dean of the Binhai Research Institute of Nankai University. In April 2009, he was proposed as vice president of China Economic and Social Council.

== Works ==
- 中国人眼中的美国和美国人 [America and Americans Through Chinese Eyes] (in Chinese). Beijing: China Intercontinental Press. 2005. ISBN 9787508507682.
- 浦东逻辑——浦东开发与经济全球化 [The Logic of Pudong New Area: the Development of Pudong New Area and the Economic Globalization] (in Chinese). Shanghai: Joint Publishing House. 2007. ISBN 9787542624505.
- 在同一世界 [In the Same World] (in Chinese). Shenyang, Liaoning: Liaoning Education Press. 2007. ISBN 9787538280401.
- 在同一世界：跨文化交流 [One World: Bridging the Communication Gap]. Beijing: China Intercontinental Press. 2008. ISBN 9787508514062.
- 公共外交与跨文化交流 [How China Communicates: Public Diplomacy in a Global Age] (in Chinese). Beijing: Renmin University of China Press. 2011. ISBN 9787300133843.
- 跨国对话 [The Wisdom of Public Diplomacy Cross-Border Dialogue] (in Chinese). Beijing: New World Press. 2012. ISBN 9787510426551.
- 跨国经营公共外交十讲 [Public Diplomacy in World Business] (in Chinese). Beijing: New World Press. 2014. ISBN 9787510448119.
- 公共外交战略 [Public Diplomacy Strategy] (in Chinese). Beijing: Learning Press. 2014. ISBN 9787514704426.
- 直面媒体20年 [Communication with Media in Two Decades] (in Chinese). Beijing: New World Press. 2019. ISBN 9787510453755.
- Zhao Qizheng; John Naisbitt; Doris Naisbitt (2010). 对话：中国模式 [A Dialogue between East and West] (in Chinese). Beijing: New World Press. ISBN 9787510410857.
- Zhao Qizheng; Wu Jianmin (2013). 正见民声 [Communication Make Your Life Better] (in Chinese). Beijing: Renmin University of China Press. ISBN 9787300179230.
- Zhao Qizheng; Du Weiming; Ge Jianxiong; Xie Yu (2016). 大国梦起 变动秩序中的中国发展进路 [Chinese Dream] (in Chinese). Beijing: Beijing University Press. ISBN 9787301271070.
- Zhao Qizheng; Shao Yudong (2017). 浦东奇迹（新版） [Pudong Miracle: A Case-study of China's Fast-track Economy] (in Chinese). Beijing: China Intercontinental Press. ISBN 9787508536163.
- Zhao Qizheng; Louis Palau (2021). 江边对话：一位无神论者和一位基督徒的友好交流 [Riverside Talks: A Friendly Dialogue Between an Atheist and a Christian] (in Chinese). Beijing: New World Press. ISBN 9787802281394.

Government offices
New title	Governor of Pudong New Area; 1992–1998	Succeeded by Zhou Yupeng
Preceded by Zeng Jianhui	Director of the State Council Information Office; 1998–2005	Succeeded by Cai Wu
Party political offices
New title	Communist Party Secretary of Pudong New Area; 1992–1998	Succeeded by Zhou Yupeng
Assembly seats
Preceded by Liu Jianfeng	Director of the Foreign Affairs Committee of the National Committee of the Chinese People's Political Consultative Conference; 2008–2013	Succeeded by Pan Yunhe
