= Sun Jiazheng =

Chinese politician

- 孙家正
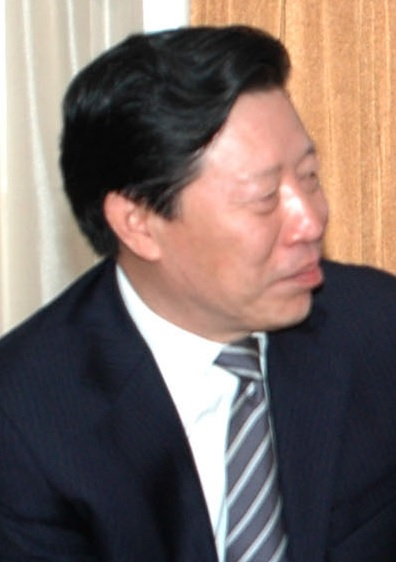
- Sun Jiazheng

Vice Chairman of the Chinese People's Political Consultative Conference
- In office 5 March 2008 – 5 March 2013
- Chairman: Jia Qinglin

Chairman of the China Federation of Literary and Art Circles
- In office 2006–2016
- Preceded by: Zhou Weizhi
- Succeeded by: Tie Ning

Minister of Culture
- In office March 1998 – March 2008
- Premier: Zhu Rongji → Wen Jiabao
- Preceded by: Liu Zhongde
- Succeeded by: Cai Wu

Director of the State Administration of Radio, Film, and Television
- In office 1994–1998
- Premier: Zhu Rongji
- Preceded by: Ai Zhisheng
- Succeeded by: Tian Congming

Secretary of Xuzhou Committee of Chinese Communist Party
- In office 1984–1985
- Preceded by: Wang Qihua
- Succeeded by: Zheng Liangyu

Personal details
- Born: March 1944 (age 82) Siyang, Jiangsu, China
- Party: Chinese Communist Party
- Education: Nanjing University

Sun Jiazheng (simplified Chinese: 孙家正; traditional Chinese: 孫家正; pinyin: Sūn Jiāzhèng; born March 1944) is a politician of the People's Republic of China. He served as Minister of Radio, Film and Television between 1994 and 1998, before serving as Minister of Culture from March 1998 to March 2008. He was the chairman of the China Federation of Literary and Art Circles from 2006 to 2016.

== Biography ==
Sun was born in Siyang, Jiangsu Province, during the Republic of China in March 1944. Sun joined the Chinese Communist Party in January 1966. He graduated from Nanjing University in 1968, where he majored in Chinese. After graduation, Sun labor at May Seventh Cadre School in Liuhe County, Jiangsu Province.

Sun entered politics in 1971 during the Cultural Revolution. After the reform and opening up, Sun served as secretary of Nanjing Committee of Chinese Communist Party, then served as secretary of Xuzhou Committee of Chinese Communist Party from 1984 to 1985. In December 1989, Sun served as deputy secretary of Jiangsu Committee of Chinese Communist Party. In April 1994, Sun was transferred to Ministry of Radio, Film and Television, where he was the minister for 4 years from 1994 to 1998.

In March 1998, Sun was appointed Minister of Culture. In November 2006, Sun was elected the Chairman of the China Federation of Literary and Art Circles. In March 2008, Sun was elected 11th vice chairman of the Chinese People's Political Consultative Conference.

Party political offices
Preceded by Wang Qihua	Communist Party Secretary of Xuzhou; 1984–1985	Succeeded by Zheng Liangyu
Government offices
Preceded by Ai Zhisheng	Minister of Radio, Film and Television; 1994–1998	Succeeded by Tian Congming
Preceded by Liu Zhongde	Minister of Culture; 1998–2008	Succeeded by Cai Wu
Political offices
Preceded by Zhou Weizhi	Chairman of the China Federation of Literary and Art Circles; 2006–2016	Succeeded by Tie Ning
