= Liu Zhongde =

Chinese politician

- 刘忠德

Chairman of the Education, Science, Health and Sports Committee of the Chinese People's Political Consultative Conference
- In office 16 March 1998 – 15 March 2008
- Chairman: Li Ruihuan→Jia Qinglin
- Preceded by: Qian Weichang
- Succeeded by: Xu Guanhua

Minister of Culture
- In office December 1992 – March 1998
- Preceded by: He Jingzhi
- Succeeded by: Sun Jiazheng

Deputy Head of the Publicity Department of the Chinese Communist Party
- In office 1990–1998
- Premier: Li Peng
- Head: Wang Renzhi→Ding Guangen

Deputy Secretary-General of the State Council
- In office 3 May 1988 – July 1990
- Premier: Li Peng
- Secretary-General: Chen Junsheng→Luo Gan

Personal details
- Born: 5 May 1933 Ji'an County, Tonghua Province, Manchukuo
- Died: 25 May 2012 (aged 79) Beijing, China
- Party: Chinese Communist Party
- Education: Harbin Institute of Technology

Liu Zhongde (simplified Chinese: 刘忠德; traditional Chinese: 劉忠德; pinyin: Liú Zhōngdé; 5 May 1933 – 25 May 2012) was a politician of People's Republic of China, he was a standing committee member of the 9th and 10th Chinese People's Political Consultative Conference, and a member of the 14th CCP Central Committee, he served as Minister of Culture from December 1992 to March 1998, as deputy head of the Propaganda Department of the Chinese Communist Party from June 1990 to 1998, as deputy secretary general of the State Council from May 1988 to 1990, and vice chairman of the Ministry of Education of the People's Republic of China from June 1985 to May 1988.

== Biography ==
Liu was born in Ji'an County, Tonghua Province, Manchukuo in May 1933, he entered Harbin Institute of Technology in 1953, after graduation, he worked as a teacher in his alma mater, he was transferred to Southeast University in 1962.

In June 1985, Liu served as vice chairman of the Ministry of Education of the People's Republic of China, then served as deputy secretary general of the State Council in 1988. He worked as a deputy head of the Propaganda Department of the Chinese Communist Party from 1990 to until 1998. From 1992 to 1998, he served as Minister of Culture.

Liu died in May 2012 in Beijing.

Government offices
Preceded by He Jingzhi	Minister of Culture; 1992-1998	Succeeded by Sun Jiazheng
