= Ai Zhisheng =

Chinese politician (born 1928)

- 艾知生

Minister of Radio, Film and Television
- In office April 1985 – 1994
- Premier: Zhao Ziyang; Li Peng
- Preceded by: Wu Lengxi
- Succeeded by: Sun Jiazheng

Personal details
- Born: December 1928 Hanyang County, Hubei, China
- Died: 20 July 1997 (aged 68) Beijing, China
- Party: Chinese Communist Party
- Education: Tsinghua University

Ai Zhisheng (Chinese: 艾知生; pinyin: Aì Zhīshēng; December 1928 – 20 July 1997) was a Chinese politician who served as Minister of Radio, Film and Television from 1985 to 1994.

He was a member of the Standing Committee of the 8th Chinese People's Political Consultative Conference. He was an alternate member of the 12th Central Committee of the Chinese Communist Party and a member of the 13th and 14th Central Committee of the Chinese Communist Party.

== Biography ==
Ai was born in Hanyang County (now Hanyang District of Wuhan), Hubei, in December 1928.

In 1946, he enrolled at Tsinghua University, where he majored in the Department of Civil Engineering. He joined the Chinese Communist Party (CCP) in 1948. After graduation, he stayed and worked at the university, and eventually becoming deputy party secretary in 1960. In 1966, the Cultural Revolution broke out, he was removed from office and effectively sidelined. He was sent to the May Seventh Cadre Schools to do farm works. He was reinstated as deputy director of the Revolutionary Committee of Tsinghua University in 1971, but two years later was discharged again and forced to work in the fields as well. After Cultural Revolution, in 1977, he was appointed leader of the Sanmenxia Base Leading Group, Water Resources Department of Tsinghua University and one year later became leader of the Leading Group of Nuclear Energy Technology Research of Tsinghua University. He rose to become deputy party secretary and vice president of Tsinghua University in 1979.

Ai got involved in politics in August 1983, when he was chosen as deputy secretary of the State Council. In April 1985, he was promoted to become minister of radio, film and television, a position he held until 1994.

On 20 July 1997, he died from cancer in Beijing, at the age of 68.

Government offices
Preceded by Wu Lengxi	Minister of Radio, Film and Television; 1985–1994	Succeeded by Sun Jiazheng
