= Zhou Weizhi =

Chinese musician and politician

- 周巍峙

Honorary Chairman of the China Federation of Literary and Art Circles
- In office November 2006 – 2011

Chairman of the China Federation of Literary and Art Circles
- In office December 1996 – November 2006
- Preceded by: Cao Yu
- Succeeded by: Sun Jiazheng

Standing Committee Member of the 7th Chinese People's Political Consultative Conference
- In office April 1988 – March 1993
- Chairman: Deng Xiaoping

Minister of Culture
- In office December 1980 – April 1982
- Premier: Zhao Ziyang
- Preceded by: Huang Zhen
- Succeeded by: Zhu Muzhi

Personal details
- Born: Zhou Liangji (周良骥); June 13, 1916 Dongtai, Jiangsu, China
- Died: September 12, 2014 (aged 98) Beijing, China
- Party: Chinese Communist Party
- Spouse: Wang Kun
- Children: 2

Zhou Weizhi (Chinese: 周巍峙; pinyin: Zhōu Wēizhì; 13 June 1916 – 12 September 2014) was a Chinese musician and politician. He served as acting Minister of Culture, and was a standing committee member of the 7th Chinese People's Political Consultative Conference (CPPCC).

== Biography ==
Zhou was born Zhou Liangji (周良骥) in Dongtai, Jiangsu, Republic of China on 13 June 1916, to a poor family, both his grandfather Zhou Songquan (周松权) and father Zhou Weitang (周慰堂) were farmers. Zhou has two uncles, Zhou Xinfu (周鑫甫) and Zhou Shaoqing (周少卿). His father went to Shanghai as a worker in a factory when he at the age of 5, at the same time, he attended old-style private school and developed an interest in Chinese Opera. By the age of 9, Zhou attended middle school in 1925.

In 1926, Zhou's father took part in the Northern Expedition, he went to Shanghai and Shaoxing with his father. In 1930, Zhou worked in the library of the newspaper Shen Bao. After the January 28 Incident, Zhou worked as a secretary of Li Gongpu until 1934, he changed his name Zhou Weizhi in the same year.

From 1934 to 1937, Zhou worked in the Shanghai Cultural of National Salvation Association (上海文化届救国会). In September 1937, Zhou joined the Eighth Route Army in Linfen, Shanxi Province, and he joined the Chinese Communist Party in Xi'an in July 1938. From November 1938 to 1944, Zhou worked in the Shanxi-Chahar-Hebei Border Region (晋察冀边区). From April 1944 to 1949, Zhou worked as a teacher in Lu Xun Art Academy of Yan'an.

In 1966, the Cultural Revolution was launched by Mao Zedong, Zhou suffered political persecution. Zhou, his wife Wang Kun, and his children were sent to the May Seventh Cadre Schools to work.

From December 1977 to April 1982, Zhou served as vice minister of Culture of China. From December 1980 to April 1982, Zhou served as Minister of Culture. From December 1996 to November 2006, Zhou served as chairman of the China Federation of Literary and Art Circles. From November 2006 to 2011, Zhou served as honorary chairman of the China Federation of Literary and Art Circles.

Zhou died in Beijing on September 12, 2014.

== Personal life ==
Zhou was married to the singer Wang Kun. They had two sons, Zhou Qi (周七), and Zhou Yue (周月).

Government offices
Preceded by Huang Zhen	Minister of Culture (acting); 1980–1982	Succeeded by Zhu Muzhi
Political offices
Preceded by Cao Yu	Chairman of the China Federation of Literary and Art Circles; 1996–2006	Succeeded by Sun Jiazheng
