= China Society for Human Rights Studies =

Chinese government think tank

- 中国人权研究会
- Formation: January 1993; 33 years ago
- Headquarters: Beijing
- Region served: China
- President: Qiangba Puncog
- Parent organization: State Council Information Office
- Affiliations: China Foundation for Human Rights Development
- Website: www.chinahumanrights.org

The China Society for Human Rights Studies (CSHRS) is an organization under the supervision of the State Council Information Office, an external name for the Publicity Department of the Chinese Communist Party.

== History ==
The China Society for Human Rights Studies was established in January 1993. The research association established a website called "China Human Rights Network" in 1998; founded the magazine Human Rights in February 2002; regularly publishes the research report Chinese Human Rights in Action, and compiles and publishes the Chinese Human Rights Yearbook. The main sources of funding for the activities are the grants from the China Human Rights Development Foundation, donations from organizations, social assistance and other legal income.

== Activities ==
The activities of the China Society for Human Rights Studies can be divided into two types. One is to weaken the focus on China's human rights record by emphasizing the political defects of Western democracies, especially the United States, and to criticize the US government for failing to fulfill its human rights obligations on non-discrimination and immigration. The other is to promote the vision of "human rights with Chinese characteristics", which emphasizes that the right to economic development is superior to individual civil rights and political rights, and calls for the definition of "human rights" relative to different cultural, historical and political backgrounds. The CSHRS is primarily funded by the China Foundation for Human Rights Development.

== Presidents ==
Name	Took office	Left office	Ref.
Zhu Muzhi	July 1993	May 2000	
Zhou Jue	May 2000	May 2007	
Luo Haocai	May 10, 2007	December 2016	
Qiangba Puncog	December 23, 2016	Incumbent	

== Analysis ==
The International Campaign for Tibet states on its website that the China Society for Human Rights Studies identifies itself as a non-governmental organization but is supported by Beijing. The Change China website calls it a government-run non-governmental organization and believes that it has close ties with the Chinese Communist Party: its secretary-general, Lu Guangjin, also serves as the director of the Human Rights Affairs Bureau of the CCP Publicity Department, and its vice chairman, Li Junru, once served as the deputy director of the Theoretical Research Bureau of the Publicity Department and the deputy director of its Party History Research Office. The China Society for Human Rights Studies also shares the same office location and bureaucracy with the Seventh Bureau of the State Council Information Office (i.e., the Human Rights Bureau).

== See also ==
- Government-organized non-governmental organization
