= Zhu Muzhi =

Chinese politician (1916–2015)

- 朱穆之

President of the China Society for Human Rights Studies
- In office July 1993 – May 2007
- Preceded by: New title
- Succeeded by: Luo Haocai

Director of the State Council Information Office
- In office 1990 – December 1992
- Premier: Li Peng

Minister of Culture
- In office April 1982 – March 1986
- Preceded by: Zhou Weizhi
- Succeeded by: Wang Meng

Deputy Head of the Publicity Department of the Chinese Communist Party
- In office December 1977 – April 1982
- Head: Zhang Pinghua→Hu Yaobang→Wang Renzhong

Director of Xinhua News Agency
- In office September 1972 – December 1977
- Preceded by: Zhang Jizhi
- Succeeded by: Zeng Tao

Personal details
- Born: Zhu Zhonglong (朱仲龙); 25 December 1916 Jiangyin, Jiangsu, China
- Died: 23 October 2015 (aged 98) Beijing, China
- Party: Chinese Communist Party
- Education: Peking University

Zhu Muzhi (Chinese: 朱穆之; pinyin: Zhū Mùzhī; 25 December 1916 – 23 October 2015) was a Chinese politician. Zhu was a member of the 10th, 11th and 12th Central Committees of the Chinese Communist Party. Zhu served as president of the Xinhua News Agency, deputy head of the Publicity Department of the Chinese Communist Party, Minister of Culture, and chairman of the State Council Information Office.

== Biography ==
Zhu was born in Jiangyin, Jiangsu Province, China in December 1916. He graduated from Peking University in 1937, where he majored in foreign language.

After graduation, Zhu worked in Nanjing as an editor for Jinling Daily (金陵日报). Zhu joined the Chinese Communist Party in April 1938. From 1941 to 1943, Zhu worked in the Taihang Mountain.

From 1946 to 1964, Zhu worked in Xinhua News Agency as an editor. In 1966, the Cultural Revolution was launched by Mao Zedong, Zhu was arrested and suffered political persecution.

In September 1972, Zhu worked as the secretary of Xinhua News Agency. From December 1977 to April 1982, Zhu served as a deputy head of the Publicity Department of the Chinese Communist Party. From April 1982 to March 1986, Zhu served as Minister of Culture. From April 1991 to December 1992, Zhu served as director of the State Council Information Office. In July 1993, he served as the newly founded China Society for Human Rights Studies, a position he held for almost fourteen years until May 2007. He retired in March 2004.

He died of illness in Beijing, on October 23, 2015, aged 98.

Government offices
Preceded by Zhang Jizhi (张纪之)	Director of Xinhua News Agency; 1972–1977	Succeeded by Zeng Tao
Preceded by Zhou Weizhi	Minister of Culture; 1982–1986	Succeeded by Wang Meng
New title	Director of the State Council Information Office; 1990–1992	Succeeded by Zeng Jianhui
Academic offices
New title	President of China Society For Human Rights Studies; 1993–2007	Succeeded by Luo Haocai
