= Cai Wu =

Chinese politician (born 1949)

- 蔡武
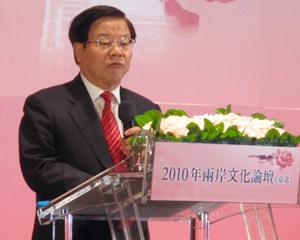
- Cai in 2010

Deputy Head of Foreign Affairs Committee of the National Committee of the Chinese people's Political Consultative Conference
- In office February 2015 – March 2018
- Head: Pan Yunhe

Minister of Culture
- In office 17 March 2008 – December 2014
- Preceded by: Sun Jiazheng
- Succeeded by: Luo Shugang

Deputy Head of the Publicity Department of the Chinese Communist Party
- In office June 2005 – December 2014
- Head: Liu Qibao

Director of the State Council Information Office
- In office 6 August 2005 – 30 March 2008
- Preceded by: Zhao Qizheng
- Succeeded by: Wang Chen

Director of the Central Office of Foreign Propaganda
- In office 6 August 2005 – 30 March 2008
- Preceded by: Zhao Qizheng
- Succeeded by: Wang Chen

Deputy Head of the International Department of the Chinese Communist Party
- In office June 1997 – June 2005
- Director: Dai Bingguo→Wang Jiarui

Personal details
- Born: October 1949 (age 76) Lanzhou, Gansu, China
- Party: Chinese Communist Party
- Education: Peking University

Cai Wu (Chinese: 蔡武; pinyin: Cài Wǔ; born October 1949) is a retired Chinese politician and a former Minister of Culture of the People's Republic of China.

== Biography ==
Cai Wu was born in Gansu Province. During the Cultural Revolution, Cai was forced to leave his home in the Wudu region of Gansu. He first went to Gaotai county, and then worked in the coal mines of Shandan county. At the same time, he worked as a communications officer for the Gansu Daily newspaper.

In October 1976, Cai was transferred to the Gansu coal authority, and became the body's political affairs cadre. After retaking the National College Entrance Examination, Cai entered Peking University in 1978. He majored in international politics, and taught at the international relations school after graduation.

In 1983, Cai joined the Communist Youth League of China, and served as the head minister of the League's Central Ministry of International Communication, before rising to become a member of the League's Central Standing Committee, and the person in charge of national youth outreach.

In 1995, Cai became an analyst at the International Department Central Committee of CPC, and in the same year rose to the position of assistant secretary of the department. In 1997, he became the deputy minister of the department. In August 2005, Cai became the head of the Information Office of the State Council. He was appointed as Minister of Culture in March 2008.

He retired after having reached the age of 65 from his post as Minister of Culture in December 2014.

Cai Wu is a member of the 17th and 18th Central Committees of the Chinese Communist Party, and a professor of international relations at Renmin University. He also has a Doctorate degree in Law.

Party political offices
Preceded by Zhao Qizheng	Director of the Central Office of Foreign Propaganda; 2005-2008	Succeeded by Wang Chen
Government offices
Preceded by Sun Jiazheng	Minister of Culture; 2008–2014	Succeeded by Luo Shugang
Preceded by Zhao Qizheng	Director of the State Council Information Office; 2005-2008	Succeeded by Wang Chen
