= China Federation of Literary and Art Circles =

Literary arts organization

- 中国文学艺术界联合会
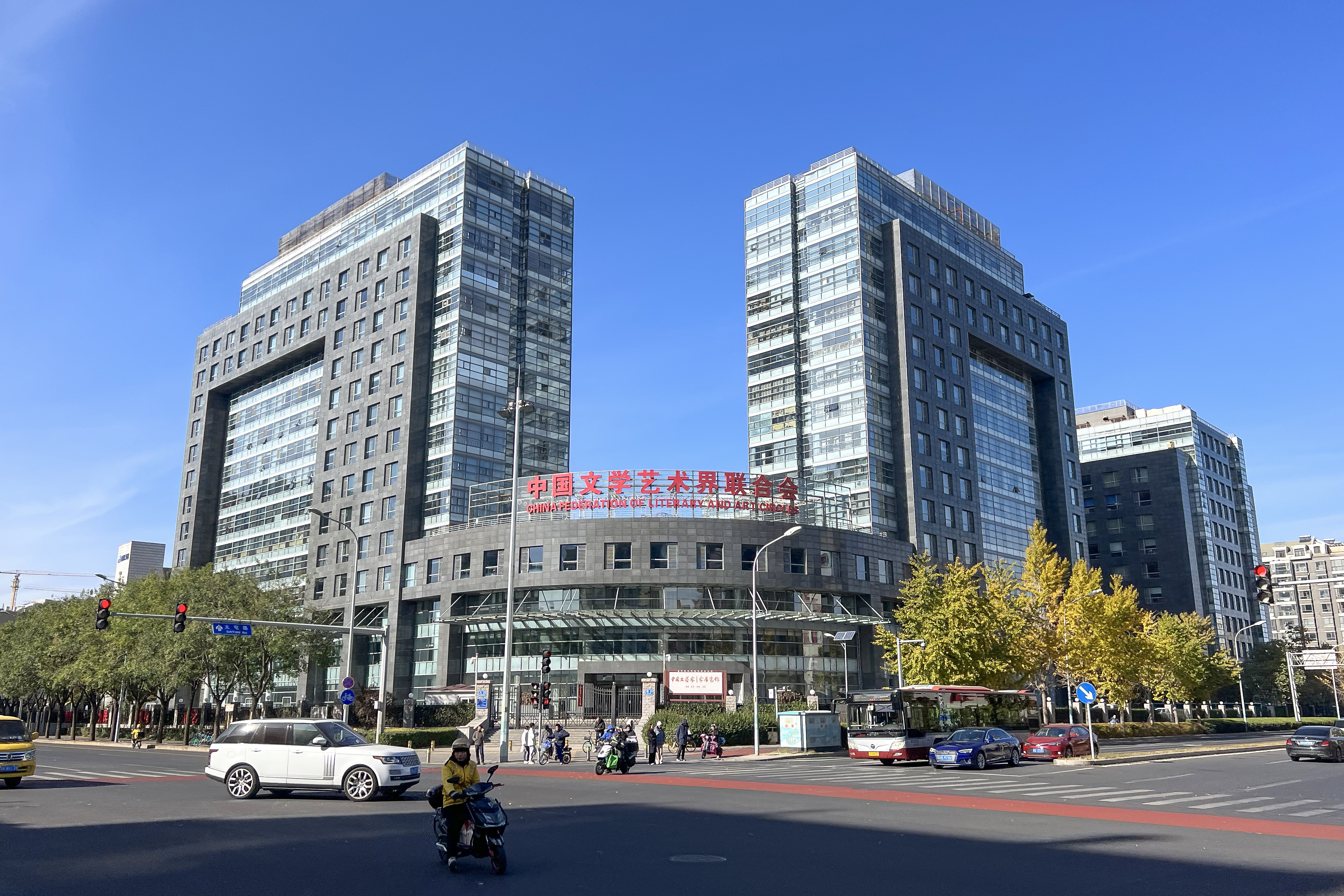
- Headquarters
- Formation: July 19, 1949; 77 years ago
- Type: People's organization
- Location: Building 32, No. 1, Beishatan Courtyard, Chaoyang, Beijing, China
- President: Tie Ning
- CCP Committee Secretary: Zhao Shi
- Website: www.cflac.org.cn

China Federation of Literary and Art Circles
- Simplified Chinese: 中国文学艺术界联合会
- Traditional Chinese: 中國文學藝術界聯合會
Transcriptions
Standard Mandarin
- Hanyu Pinyin: Zhōngguó Wénxué Yìshùjiè Liánhéhuì

Abbreviation
- Simplified Chinese: 中国文联
- Traditional Chinese: 中國文聯
Transcriptions
Standard Mandarin
- Hanyu Pinyin: Zhōngguó Wénlián

The China Federation of Literary and Art Circles (CFLAC), established in July 1949, is a Chinese people's organization composed of nationwide associations of writers and artists. CFLAC is one of the founders of Chinese People's Political Consultative Conference. CFLAC includes artist associations which are involved in such activities as academic studies and discussion, performances, exhibitions, and competitions.

== History ==
CFLAC was established in July 1949 and is a Chinese people's organization composed of nationwide associations of writers and artists. It held its first national congress that month. At one point during the first conference, Mao Zedong unexpectedly appeared on stage and gave a brief speech in which he told the attendees, "You are the writers of the people, the artists of the people, the organizers of the people's literary and artistic work. You are of benefit to the revolution, of benefit to the people."

After the founding of the People's Republic of China (PRC) in 1949, the Chinese Communist Party's Propaganda Department organized networks of cultural workers' associations which were headed by the CFLAC. The state incorporated existing cultural enterprises into the state apparatus, which provided stable income and working environments for artists. The state commissioned writers and artists to create works in various genres celebrating the new country.

CFLAC's second congress was held in 1953. CFLAC's third congress was held in 1960. No CFLAC congresses were held during the Cultural Revolution.

On 30 October 1979, Deng Xiaoping delivered a speech at the fourth national congress of CFLAC. This introduced the idea of the leader's speech as CFLAC as an important element of cultural policy in the PRC. Deng stated:

The most fundamental standard for assessing all of our work is whether or not it is of benefit or harm to the four modernizations. Literature and art workers must work together with workers in education, in theory, in journalism and in politics, as well as with other relevant comrades, to carry out a long-term and effective struggle in the realm of ideology against thought habits that are harmful to the four modernizations.

Deng also stated that art and literature must cultivate the new socialist person, and that "[w]riters and artists must zealously study Marxism, Leninism, and Mao Zedong Thought."

Hu Qili delivered an address at the 1988 meeting. Hu stated, "Out literature and arts serve the people and serve socialism. They cannot be without ideals, without purpose, nor without social responsibility." According to Hu, artistic creation should:

"[A]waken the people's sense of historical responsibility towards national revival and social progress, to arouse the Chinese people's spirit of hard work and courage, unity and struggle, and reform and creativity, to raise our people's national self-respect and confidence, in order to stand tall amidst the forest of nations in a completely new manner."

Since 1996, CFLAC's national conference occurs every five years and coincides with China Writers Association's meeting.

In his 1996 speech to CFLAC, Jiang Zemin emphasized that writers and artists should oppose capitalism and support socialism. In his 2001 speech, he stated that writers and artists had three main tasks: (1) building socialism with Chinese characteristics, (2) helping achieving socialist modernization, and (3) helping the "great rejuvenation of the Chinese nation," which he described as requiring both a strong material base and a strong spiritual civilization. Jiang's 2001 speech also promoted international cultural exchange and increased cultural communication with Hong Kong, Macau, Taiwan, and the overseas Chinese community.

At the 2006 CFLAC congress, Hu Jintao described the arts and literature as important for enriching people's moral character, expressing the ideals of humanity, enriching aesthetic enjoyment, and promoting social progress. He discussed competition, including in the cultural fields, as part of what is necessary to achieve a "moderately prosperous society." Hu also warned against "money worship," "extreme individualism," and hedonism. In 2011, he emphasized the moral dimensions of the arts and China's contribution to the arts throughout the "five thousand years of Chinese civilization".

In 2014, CFLAC issued an open letter encouraging writers and artists to emphasize their practice of socialist core values.

Xi Jinping's 2016 speech highlighted "cultural confidence," "serving the people," "courage in innovation and creation", and "firm adherence to artistic ideals". At the 2021 speech, Xi urged that artists should "listen to the Party's words."

== Branches ==
- China Writers Association (中国作家协会), which is CFLAC's largest constituent group.
- China Artists Association (中国美术家协会)
- China Film Association (中国电影家协会)
- Chinese Musicians Association (中国音乐家协会)
- China Television Artists Association (中国电视艺术家协会)
- China Theatre Association (中国戏剧家协会)
- China Calligraphers Association (中国书法家协会)

== Presidents of the Federation ==
- Tie Ning 2016–present
- Sun Jiazheng 2006–2016
- Zhou Weizhi 1996–2006
- Cao Yu 1988–1996
- Zhou Yang 1979–1988
- Guo Moruo 1960–1979
  - Vice-president: Mao Dun, Zhou Yang, Mei Lanfang, Ba Jin, Xia Yan, Cai Chusheng, Lao She, Xu Guangping
- Guo Moruo 1953–1960
  - Vice-president: Mao Dun, Zhou Yang
- Guo Moruo 1949–1953
  - Vice-president: Mao Dun, Zhou Yang

== Officials ==
- Chinese Communist Party Committee Secretary: Zhao Shi 2011–present
- Chinese Communist Party Committee Secretary: Hu Zhenmin 2004–2010

== Publishing ==
- China Art Newspaper
- Contemporary TV
- Popular Cinema
- Popular Photography
