= Huang Zhen =

Chinese politician

- 黄镇

Standing Committee Member of the Central Advisory Commission
- In office 1982–1987
- Head: Deng Xiaoping

Minister of Culture
- In office 1977–1980
- Premier: Hua Guofeng
- Preceded by: Yu Huiyong
- Succeeded by: Zhou Weizhi (acting)

Deputy Head of the Publicity Department of the Chinese Communist Party
- In office 1977–1980
- Head: Zhang Pinghua→Hu Yaobang

China Ambassador to France
- In office June 1964 – March 1973
- Preceded by: New title
- Succeeded by: Zeng Tao

Vice-Minister of Foreign Affairs of the People's Republic of China
- In office 1961–1964
- Premier: Zhou Enlai
- Minister: Chen Yi

China Ambassador to Indonesia
- In office November 1954 – June 1961
- Preceded by: Wang Renshu
- Succeeded by: Yao Zhongming

China Ambassador to Hungary
- In office July 1950 – October 1954
- Preceded by: New title
- Succeeded by: Hao Deqing

Personal details
- Born: January 8, 1909 Tongcheng County, Anhui, Qing China
- Died: December 10, 1989 (aged 80) Beijing, China
- Party: Chinese Communist Party
- Spouse: Zhu Lin
- Relations: Dai Bingguo (son-in-law)
- Education: Shanghai Art College; Xinhua Art University

Huang Zhen (simplified Chinese: 黄镇; traditional Chinese: 黃鎮; pinyin: Huáng Zhèn; 8 January 1909 – 10 December 1989) was a politician of the People's Republic of China.

== Biography ==
Huang was born in Tongcheng County, Anhui during the Qing dynasty (1644–1911). After graduating from Tongcheng Secondary School, he entered Shanghai Art College (上海美術專科學校) in 1925, majoring in painting. He did not complete his studies because he was expelled from the college after taking part in a student movement. Huang was admitted to Xinhua Art University (新華藝術大學). After graduation, he worked as a teacher at Fushan Middle School (浮山中學) in his hometown. Huang was discharged for supporting a student movement in 1929. He enlisted in Feng Yuxiang's Northwest Army (Guominjun) in 1930.

In 1931, Huang took part in the Ningdu uprising and joined the Chinese Red Army. He joined the Chinese Communist Party in 1932. Huang took part in the Long March in 1934. During the Second Sino-Japanese War, Huang served as the vice chairman of 129th Division of the Eighth Route Army. Huang transferred to Henan as the secretary of Yubei, then he was transferred to Taihang Mountain as the chairman of Taihang Military Region. In 1948, Huang was transferred to Xibaipo as the vice chairman of the People's Liberation Army General Political Department.

Huang was appointed China's Ambassador to Hungary in 1950, he was transferred to China's Ambassador to Indonesia in 1954. In the same year, Huang attended the Asian-African Conference with Zhou Enlai. In 1961, Huang served as vice minister of Foreign Affairs of the People's Republic of China, then he served as the ambassador to deal with Sino-Indian border dispute. In 1964, Huang served as China's Ambassador to France.

In 1971, Huang went to America. In 1973, Huang was appointed chairman of Liaison Office of the People's Republic of China in United States. In 1977, Huang served as deputy head of the Propaganda Department of the Chinese Communist Party and Minister of Culture.

In 1982, Huang retired. He served as a standing committee member of the Central Advisory Commission. Huang died in Beijing in 1989.

== Personal life ==
Huang married Zhu Lin, who is also a politician.

Diplomatic posts
| New title | China Ambassador to Hungary; 1950–1954 | Succeeded by Hao Deqing |
| Preceded by Wang Renshu | China Ambassador to Indonesia; 1954–1961 | Succeeded by Yao Zhongming |
| Preceded by Song Zhiguang | China Ambassador to France; 1964–1973 | Succeeded by Zeng Tao |
Government offices
| Preceded by Yu Huiyong | Minister of Culture; 1977–1980 | Succeeded by Zhou Weizhi (acting) |
