= State Council Information Office =

External name of the Central Propaganda Department of the Chinese Communist Party

- 国务院新闻办公室
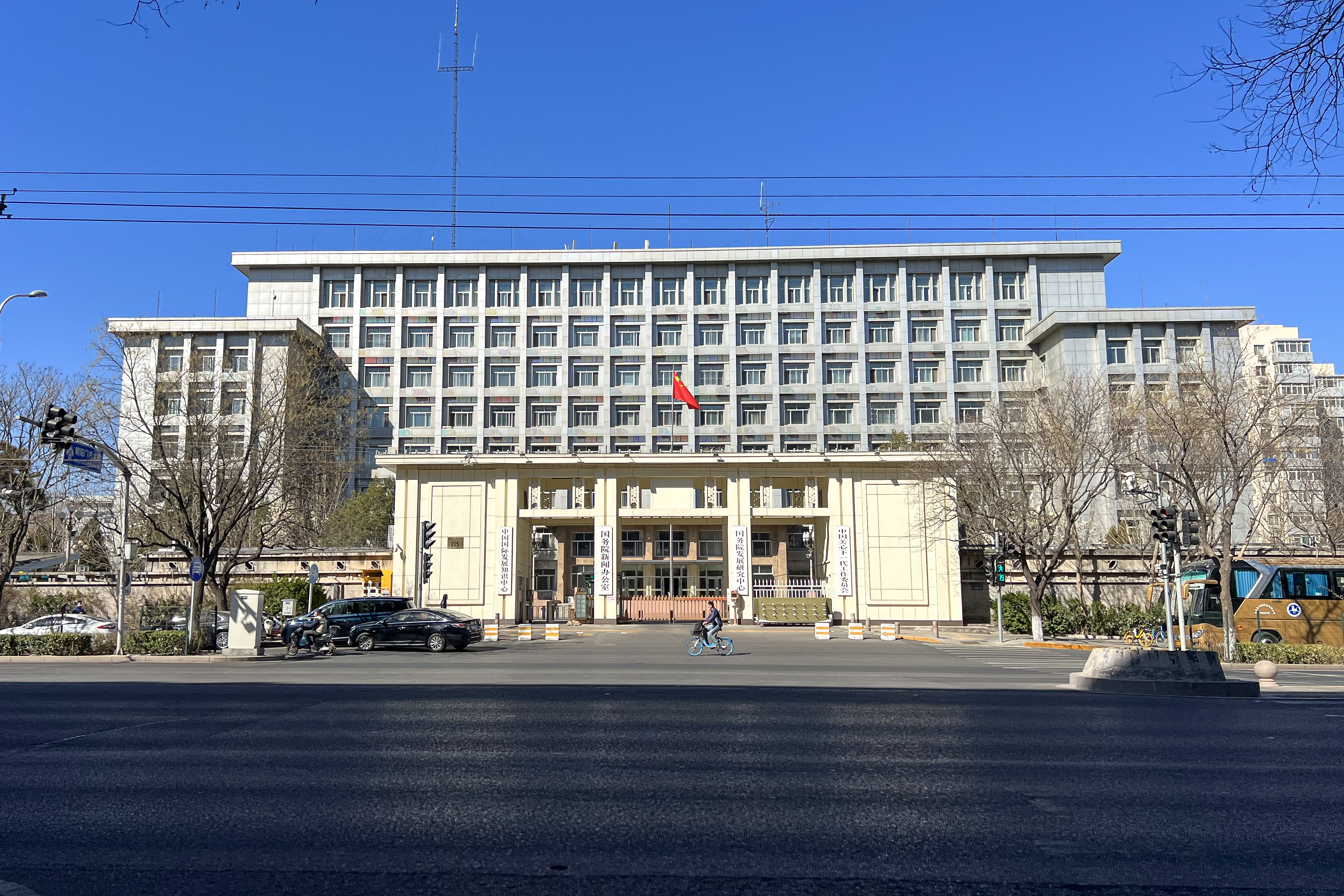
- Headquarters

Information office overview
- Formed: April 8, 1980
- Jurisdiction: Government of China
- Status: External name of the Central Propaganda Department of the Chinese Communist Party; Administrative office of the State Council
- Headquarters: Beijing Telegraph Building, 11 West Chang’an Avenue, Xicheng District, Beijing; 39°55′53″N 116°25′37″E
- Director responsible: Vacant
- Child agencies: China Internet Information Center; China Society for Human Rights Studies
- Website: english.scio.gov.cn

Chinese name
- Simplified Chinese: 国务院新闻办公室
- Traditional Chinese: 國務院新聞辦公室
- Literal meaning: State Council News Office
Transcriptions
Standard Mandarin
- Hanyu Pinyin: Guówùyuàn Xīnwén Bàngōngshì

The State Council Information Office (SCIO) is the chief information office of the State Council of the People's Republic of China and an external name of the Central Propaganda Department of the Chinese Communist Party.

Historically, SCIO was the external name of the Office of External Propaganda (OEP) of the Chinese Communist Party (CCP) under an arrangement termed "one institution with two names." In 2014, OEP was absorbed into the Central Propaganda Department, turning SCIO into an external nameplate.

== History ==
The SCIO was formed in 1991 when the CCP Central Committee decided that the External Propaganda Leading Group (中央对外宣传小组) of the CCP Central Committee should have the name of State Council Information Office externally. The External Propaganda Leading Group was transformed into the Office of External Propaganda (OEP, 中央对外宣传办公室), officially called in English as the International Communications Office. The office was created with the goal of improving the Chinese government's international image following the 1989 Tiananmen Square protests and massacre. According to scholar Anne-Marie Brady, the SCIO became a separate unit from the CCP Central Propaganda Department but still connected to it and was the "public face of this new direction in foreign propaganda work."

In May 2014, the OEP was formally abolished, with its functions absorbed into the CCP's Central Propaganda Department. The SCIO turned into an external nameplate for the Propaganda Department, used primarily for activities of one of its bureaus. In September 2018, the Press Conference Hall of the SCIO was moved from 225 Chaoyangmennei Street, Dongcheng District to the Beijing Telegraph Building in 11 West Chang'an Avenue, Xicheng District.

== Structure ==
Before its absorption to the Propaganda Department, the OEP had nine functional bureaus, with corresponding ones in the SCIO, as well as supervised organs. It oversaw the China Foreign Languages Publishing Administration, while its seventh bureau oversaw the China Society for Human Rights Studies (CSHRS), a front group established in 1993 dealing with human rights-related narratives towards China.

The SCIO oversees the China Internet Information Center. The SCIO formerly had responsibility for internet censorship in China, with its Internet Affairs Bureau overseeing internet censorship and the suppression of "disruptive" activity on the web in mainland China. In May 2011, the SCIO transferred the offices, namely its fifth and ninth bureaus, which regulated the internet to a new subordinate agency, the State Internet Information Office (SIIO). In May 2014, with the abolishment of the OEP, the SIIO (renamed in English as the Cyberspace Administration of China) was absorbed into the newly established Central Leading Group for Cybersecurity and Informatization.

Since the 2014 merger SCIO's nine bureaus are now controlled by the Central Propaganda Department, sometimes used by the department's bureaus as external nameplates.

== List of directors ==
Every SCIO director except Zhao Qizheng have also served as deputy heads of the Central Propaganda Department.

Name	Chinese name	Took office	Left office	Ref.
Zhu Muzhi	朱穆之	1991	November 1992	
Zeng Jianhui	曾建徽	November 1992	April 1998	
Zhao Qizheng	趙啟正	April 1998	6 August 2005	
Cai Wu	蔡武	6 August 2005	30 March 2008	
Wang Chen	王晨	30 March 2008	26 April 2013	
Cai Mingzhao	蔡名照	26 April 2013	9 January 2015	
Jiang Jianguo	蒋建国	9 January 2015	25 July 2018	
Xu Lin	徐麟	21 August 2018	9 June 2022	
Sun Yeli	孙业礼	17 January 2023	11 April 2024	
Mo Gaoyi	莫高义	11 April 2024	October 2026	

== See also ==
- China International Communications Group
- International communication center
