= Sun Yeli =

Chinese politician

- 孙业礼
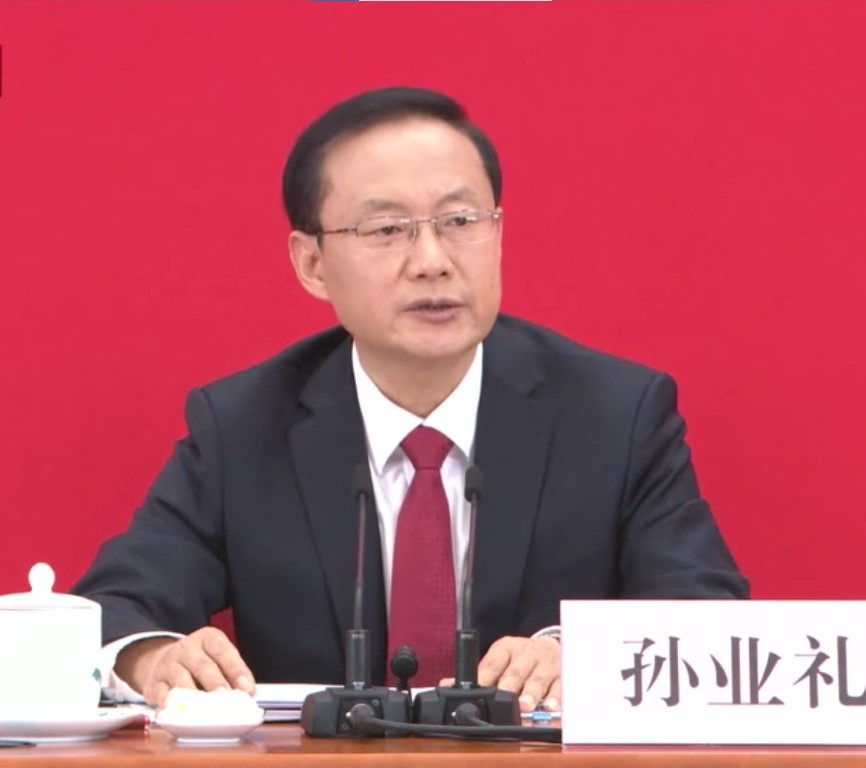

Minister of Culture and Tourism
- Incumbent
- Assumed office 29 December 2023
- Premier: Li Qiang
- Preceded by: Hu Heping

Director of the State Council Information Office
- In office 17 January 2023 – 11 April 2024
- Premier: Li Keqiang; Li Qiang
- Preceded by: Xu Lin
- Succeeded by: Mo Gaoyi

Deputy Head of the Publicity Department of the Chinese Communist Party
- Incumbent
- Assumed office January 2021
- Head: Huang Kunming; Li Shulei

Personal details
- Born: December 9, 1964 (age 61) Anqiu County, Shandong, China
- Party: Chinese Communist Party
- Education: Peking University

Chinese name
- Simplified Chinese: 孙业礼
- Traditional Chinese: 孫業禮
Transcriptions
Standard Mandarin
- Hanyu Pinyin: Sūn Yèlǐ

Sun Yeli (Chinese: 孙业礼; born 9 December 1964) is a Chinese politician who is the current Minister of Culture and Tourism and a deputy head of the Publicity Department of the Chinese Communist Party and the Minister of Culture and Tourism. From 2023 to 2024, he served as the director of the State Council Information Office.

== Biography ==
Sun was born in Anqiu County (now Anqiu), Shandong, on 9 December 1964. He received his bachelor's degree and master's degree from Peking University in 1985 and 1988, respectively. Starting in July 1988, he served in several posts in the Party Documents Research Office of the CCP Central Committee, including deputy secretary-general, director of the Fifth Editorial Department, and deputy director. He became deputy president of the Institute of Party History and Literature of the CCP Central Committee in March 2018, and served until January 2021, when he was appointed deputy head of the Publicity Department of the Chinese Communist Party. He was a representative of the 20th National Congress of the Chinese Communist Party. On 15 October 2022, he concurrently served as spokesman of the 20th National Congress of the Chinese Communist Party. On 17 January 2023, he was appointed as the director of the State Council Information Office (SCIO). On 29 December 2023, Sun was appointed as the Minister of Culture and Tourism. On 11 April 2024, he was succeeded by Mo Gaoyi as the SCIO director.

== Publication ==
- 共和国经济风云中的陈云 [Chen Yun in the Economic Situation of the Republic] (in Chinese). being: Central Party Literature Press. 1996. ISBN 9787507303230.
