= Ziye =

1933 novel by Mao Dun

- A copy of Ziye (Midnight) from the National Library of China
- Author: Mao Dun
- Original title: 子夜
- Working title: 夕阳 (Xiyang)
- Genre: Realism
- Set in: Shanghai
- Publication date: 1933
- Publication place: China

Ziye (子夜), or known by its English translated title as Midnight (Midnight: A Romance of China, 1930), is a 1933 novel by Chinese author Mao Dun. It is a realist depiction of life in contemporary Shanghai. In addition to the full edition, there were also abridged editions of the novel in publication. The novel depicts the wealth and modernity of modern-Shanghai, influenced by foreign colonialism and capitalism; however, Western modernity frightens the protagonist's father, who is a member of the Chinese landed gentry from the countryside.

Mao Dun depicts the modernity of Shanghai with "purple" prose, like "three 1930-model Citroens", electric lights, Browning rifles, and "Grafton gauze" flannel suits. The novel also uses English terms like "beauty parlors" and a "neon" sign with the words "Light, Heat, Power!", which appears on the first page. The other English is from two plays by Shakespeare: Love's Labour's Lost and The Tempest, as well as Scott's Ivanhoe and three references: a headline, an expression, and the Roman Emperor Nero.

== Plot ==
Ziye portrays the unraveling world of Wu Sun-fu, a leading Shanghai industrialist. His family came from the provinces, with his father representing the old China lost in turmoil. The Depression, the Chinese civil war, and strikes force alliance with foreign capitalists.

== Legacy ==
Ziye is often considered to be one of Mao Dun's most representative works, with Old Shanghai's cosmopolitanism depicted in unflinching detail and realism. Mao Dun was later commemorated with the Mao Dun Literature Prize.
