= Wang Meng (author) =

Chinese writer

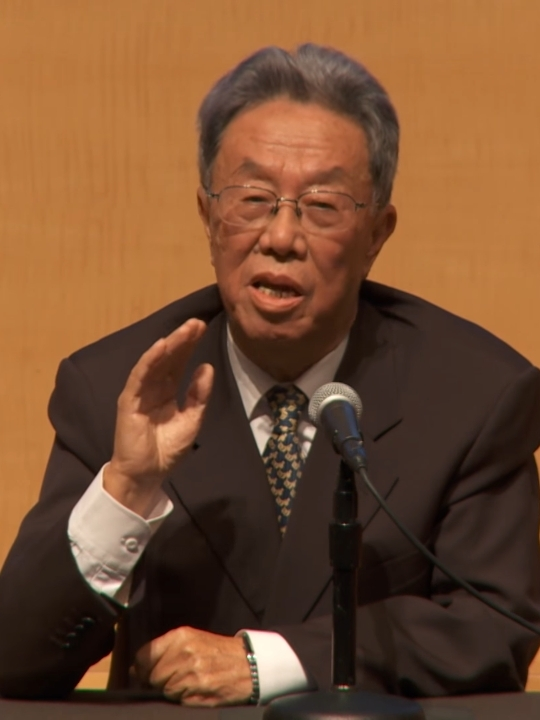
- Wang in 2016

Minister of Culture
- In office 1986–1989
- Preceded by: Zhu Muzhi
- Succeeded by: He Jingzhi

Personal details
- Born: October 15, 1934 (age 91) Beijing, China
- Party: Chinese Communist Party
- Education: Beijing Normal University
- Occupation: Writer

Wang Meng (Chinese: 王蒙; pinyin: Wáng Méng; born 15 October 1934) is a Chinese writer who served as China's Minister of Culture from 1986 to 1989.

== Biography ==
Wang was born in Beijing in 1934. During his middle school years, he was introduced to the Chinese Communist Party ideology and joined the Communist Youth League.

Wang Meng has published over 60 books since 1955, including six novels, ten short-story collections, as well as other works of poetry, prose and critical essays.

In 1956 Wang published a novella, "The Young Newcomer in the Organizational Department" (组织部来了个年轻人). The novella addresses issues related to the behavior of dogmatic bureaucrats of the older generation. The protagonist is a young cadre transferred to the local organization department, where he grows fond of a female colleague. Assigned to report on Party membership in a local factory, he finds that the workers are greatly dissatisfied with factory management, and the organization department has not taken their reports about mismanagement seriously. Organization department leaders initially dismiss the protagonist's reports as well and cover for factory management. The protagonist and his female colleague encourage each other, and eventually the protagonist decides to be resolute in making the Party better, and in the final scene of the novella goes to knock loudly and confidently on the District Secretary's door to report the situation.

The novella caused a great uproar. It was discussed in 43 articles between December 1956 and May 1957. Detractors criticized what they described as the protagonist's self-absorbed sense of heroism and the novel's "bourgeois" musings about love and romance. The novella also had defenders. Mao Zedong stated that he had read the novella and, though he viewed it as having some shortcomings, he viewed it as consistent with the Hundred Flowers Movement. A People's Daily article by Lin Mohan discussed strengths and weaknesses of the novella, and the criticized portions were mainly parts of the novella inserted by Wang's editor, which Wang did not feel he could object to. In May 1957, Wang criticized editors in general, contending that they often displayed "the airs of businessmen and of the demimonde" and that they should be more socialist and less commercial in their thinking.

During the Anti-Rightist Campaign, Wang was questioned repeatedly by superiors in his work unit. He himself criticized Ding Ling, a prominent target of the campaign, during this period. In May 1958, Wang was designated a rightist and sent to the countryside for reform.

In 1961, Wang's case was reconsidered and the label of "rightist" removed from him. Despite having recently been deemed a rightist, Wang published some works in People's Literature during the early 1960s. In 1962, he moved back to Beijing and worked as a university professor.

In 1963, he met with representatives of the Xinjiang branch of the China Writers Association and decided that Xinjiang might be a fascinating place to work as a professional writer. He moved to Xinjiang, where he worked and lived until after the Cultural Revolution.

After the Cultural Revolution, Wang returned to Beijing. His political reputation was fully rehabilitated and he published extensively, building a reputation as a highly original writer and a committed socialist and Party member.

He served as China's Minister of Culture from July 1986 to September 1989. Wang's tenure include an intensification of economic reform in the cultural sphere. According to Wang, "It is as simple as this, if China's economy fails, the people will suffer from hunger as they did before, and developing culture will be out of the question." While in Wang's view, artists should not seek to become rich through the market, they should seek out audiences through the market.

When he lost his position as Minister of Culture, he retained his position as deputy head of the China Writers Association. At the time, CWA's leadership was divided between reformers and their opponents. According to academic Richard Curt Kraus, this "was apparently seen as an appropriate base for a reform-minded novelist and cultural official" and Wang experienced "no loss of prestige."

In 1999, Wang, along with Liu Xinwu and Mo Yan, was a referee for an online literature contest hosted by NetEase which contributed to the early growth of internet literature in China.

On 27 June 2015 at the United International College's 7th Graduation Ceremony in Zhuhai, Wang Meng was rewarded with the Honorary Fellowships. In 2015 he was awarded the Mao Dun Literature Prize for The Scenery Around Here.

== Selected publication ==
Books available in English

- 100 Glimpses into China: Short Short Stories from China (by Wang Meng, Feng Jicai, Wang Zengqi and others) (Xu Yihe and Daniel J. Meissner). Beijing: Foreign Languages Press, 1989.
- Alienation (Nance T. Lin and Tong Qi Lin). Hong Kong: Joint Publishing Co., 1993.
- Bolshevik Salute: A Modernist Chinese Novel (Wendy Larson). Seattle: University of Washington Press, 1989.
- Prize-winning Stories from China, 1978-1979 (by Liu Xinwu, Wang Meng, and others). Beijing: Foreign Languages Press, 1981.
- Snowball (Cathy Silber and Deirdre Huang). Beijing: Foreign Languages Press, 1989.
- The Butterfly and Other Stories (intro. by Rui An). Beijing: Chinese Literature,1983.
- The Strain of Meeting (Denis C. Mair). Beijing: Foreign Languages Press, 1989.
- The Stubborn Porridge and Other Stories (Zhu Hong). New York: George Braziller, 1994.
- Wonderful Xinjiang: A photographic journey of China's largest province as told through the pen of Wang Meng. Pleasantville: Reader's Digest, 2004.
- On the Road at Eighteen, which portrays a young man sent on the road by his father, and who is attacked by a group of peasants-turned-robbers, 1986.
- A Life; Memoir 9 - https://www.amazon.com/Wang-Meng-Life-Zhu-Hong/dp/1937385604

Government offices
Preceded by Zhu Muzhi	Minister of Culture; 1986–1989	Succeeded by He Jingzhi
