= Mao Dun =

Chinese writer (1896–1981)

- 茅盾
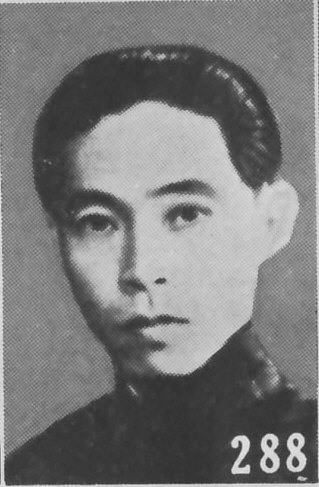
- Mao Dun as pictured in The Most Recent Biographies of Chinese Dignitaries

Minister of Culture
- In office 21 October 1949 – January 1965
- Premier: Zhou Enlai
- Succeeded by: Lu Dingyi

Chairman of the China Writers Association
- In office 23 July 1949 – 27 March 1981
- Succeeded by: Ba Jin

Personal details
- Born: 4 July 1896 Tongxiang, Jiaxing, Zhejiang, Qing Empire
- Died: 27 March 1981 (aged 84) Beijing, China
- Party: Chinese Communist Party
- Spouse: Kong Dezhi (孔德沚)
- Relations: Shen Zemin (brother)
- Education: Beijing University

Mao Dun
- Chinese: 茅盾
Transcriptions
Standard Mandarin
- Hanyu Pinyin: Máo Dùn
- Wade–Giles: Mao Tun

Shen Dehong
- Traditional Chinese: 沈德鴻
- Simplified Chinese: 沈德鸿
Transcriptions
Standard Mandarin
- Hanyu Pinyin: Shěn Déhóng
- Wade–Giles: Shen Te-hung

Shen Yanbing
- Chinese: 沈雁冰
Transcriptions
Standard Mandarin
- Hanyu Pinyin: Shěn Yànbīng
- Wade–Giles: Shen Yen-ping

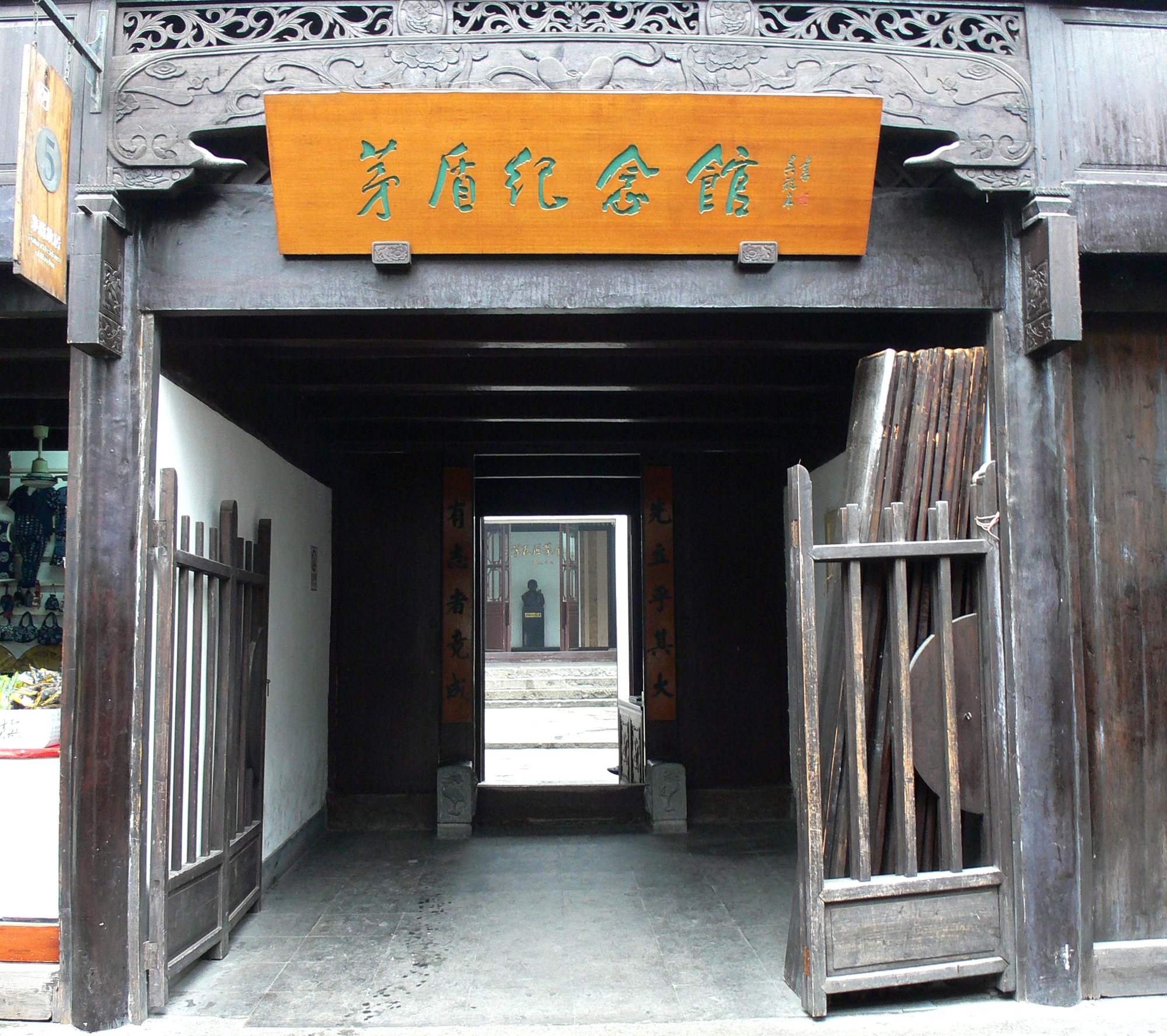
Mao Dun Memorial at his home town Wuzhen

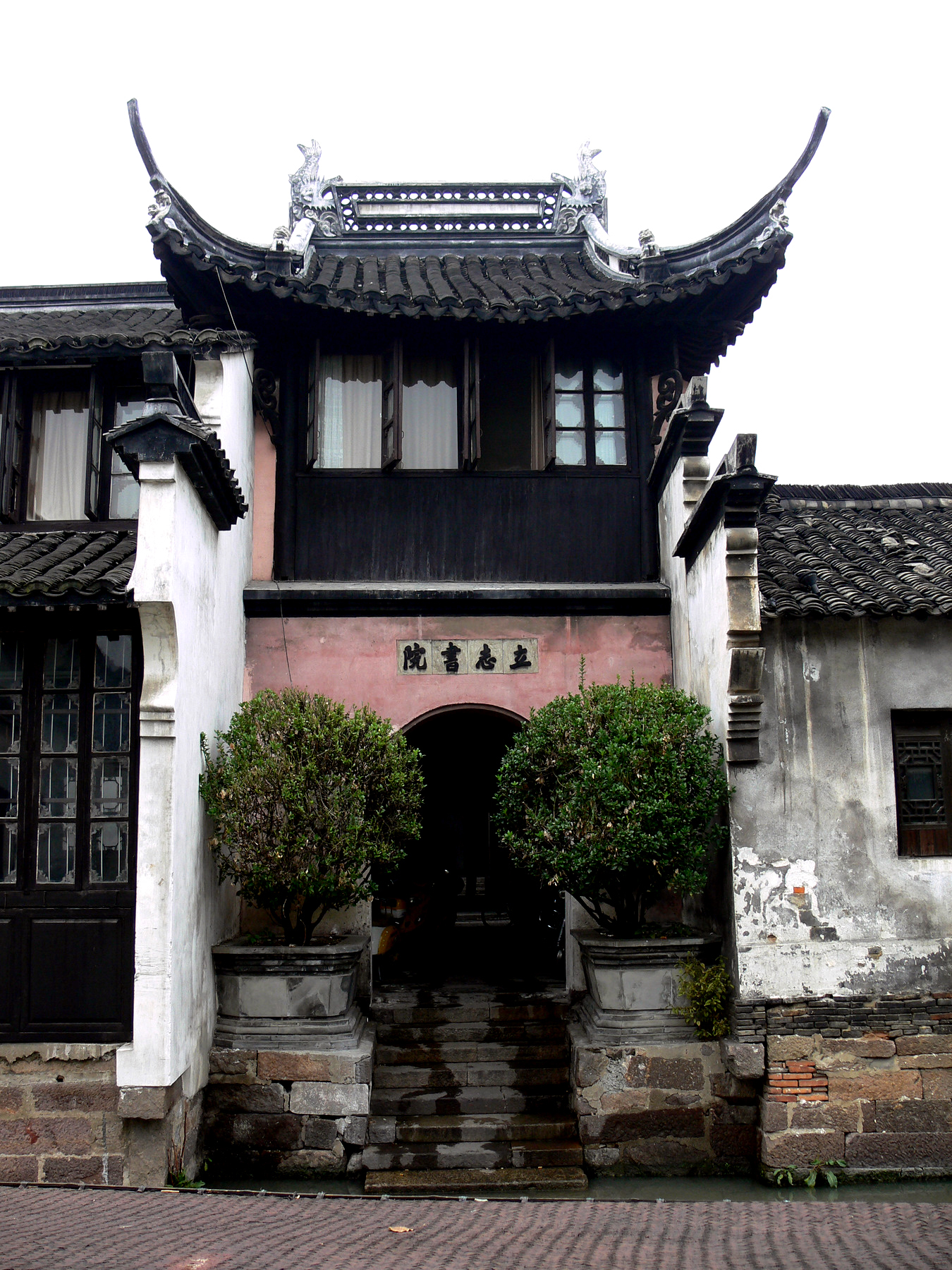
The primary school Lizhi College where Mao Dun studied in Wuzhen

Shen Dehong (Shen Yanbing; 4 July 1896 – 27 March 1981), best known by the pen name of Mao Dun, was a Chinese novelist, essayist, journalist, playwright, and literary and cultural critic. He was highly celebrated for his realist novels, including Midnight, which depicts life in cosmopolitan Shanghai. Mao was one of the founders of the Chinese Communist Party and participated in a number of left-wing cultural movements during the 1920s and 1930s. He was the editor-in-chief of Fiction Monthly and helped lead the League of Left-Wing Writers. He formed a strong friendship with fellow left-wing Chinese author Lu Xun. From 1949 to 1965, Mao served as the first Minister of Culture in the People's Republic of China.

In addition to novels, Mao Dun published a number of essays, scripts, theories, short stories, and novellas. He was well known for translating Western literature, as he had gained academic knowledge of European literature from his studies at Peking University. Additionally, although he was not the first person in China to translate the works of Scottish historical novelist Walter Scott, he is considered to be the first person to popularize Walter Scott's work in China through his "Critical Biography".

He adopted the pen name "Mao Dun" (Chinese: 矛盾) to express the tension in the conflicting revolutionary ideology within China in the 1920s. The name means "contradiction", as Mao means spears and Dun means shields. His friend Ye Shengtao changed the first character from 矛 to 茅, which literally means "thatch".

== Early life ==
His father, Shen Yongxi (Chinese: 沈永錫) taught and designed the curriculum for his son, but he died when Mao Dun was ten. Mao Dun's mother Chen Aizhu (Chinese: 陳愛珠) then became his teacher. He mentions in his memoirs that "my first instructor is my mother". Through learning from his parents, Mao Dun developed great interest in writing as well as reading during his childhood.

Mao Dun had already started to develop his writing skills when he was still in primary school. In one examination the examiner commented on Mao Dun's script: '12 year old young child, can make this language, not says motherland nobody'. There were other similar comments which indicate that Mao Dun had been a brilliant writer since his youth.

While Mao Dun was studying in secondary school in Hangzhou, extensive reading and strict writing skills training filled his life. He read the Wen Xuan, Shishuo Xinyu, and a large number of classical novels, which influenced his writing style.

Mao Dun entered the three-year foundation school offered by Peking University in 1913, in which he studied Chinese and Western literature. Due to financial difficulties, he had to quit in the summer of 1916, before his graduation. After quitting from university, he immediately got married with the daughter of Kong family, Kong Dezhi (孔德沚).

The trainings in Chinese and English as well as knowledge of Chinese and Western literature provided by the fifteen years of education Mao Dun received had prepared him to show up in the limelight of the Chinese journalistic and literary arena.

== Journalistic career ==
After graduation, Mao Dun soon got his first job in the English editing and translation sections of the Commercial Press, Shanghai branch. At the age of 21, he was invited to be the assistant editor of Xuesheng Zazhi (Chinese: 學生雜誌; lit. 'Students' Magazine') under the Commercial Press, which had published many articles about the new ideologies that had emerged in China at that time.

Apart from editing, Mao Dun also started to write about his social thoughts and criticisms. To some extent, he was inspired by the famous magazine New Youth. Like in 1917 and 1918, he wrote two editorials for Xuesheng Zazhi: Students and Society (學生與社會) and The Students of 1918, those were significant in stimulating political consciousness among the young educated Chinese.

His early literary career also included writing children's literature.

At 24 years of age, Mao Dun was already renowned as a novelist by the community in general, and in 1920, he and a group of young writers took over the magazine Fiction Monthly, to publish literature by western authors, such as Tolstoy, Chekhov, Balzac, Flaubert, Zola, Byron, Keats, and Shaw, and make new theories of literature better known. Despite the fact that he was a naturalistic novelist, he admired writers like Leo Tolstoy for their great artistic style.

In 1920, he was invited to edit a new column: The Fiction-New-Waves (小說新潮) in Fiction Monthly. He even took up the post of Chief Editor of the Monthly in the same year and was obliged to reform it thoroughly, in response to the May Fourth Movement. His young writer friends in Beijing supported him by submitting their creative writings, translating Western literature and their views on new literature theories and techniques to the magazines. The Literary Study Group (文學研究會) was formed partly because of this. The reformed Monthly was proved to be a success. It had facilitated the continuation of the New Culture Movement by selling ten thousand copies a month and more importantly by introducing Literature for life, a brand new realistic approach to Chinese literature. In this period, Mao Dun had become a leading figure of the movement in the southern part of China.

In 1921, he was among the founders of The People's Drama Society. The group was influential in developing the theoretical basis for huaju including through the society's journal Drama. The society proposed rejecting the trappings of traditional opera, advocated originality in production, the creation of new sets and costumes, and developing native Chinese spoken word drama.

On the notion of content reformation, both the innovative and conservative parties in the Commercial Press could not make a compromise. Mao Dun resigned from the Chief Editor of Fiction Monthly in 1923, but in 1927 he became the chief columnist of the Minguo yuebao (民国月报). He wrote more than 30 editorials for this newspaper to criticize Chiang Kai-shek, and to support revolutions.

== Political life ==
Inspired by the October Revolution of 1917 in Russia, Mao Dun took part in the May Fourth Movement in China. In 1920, he joined the Shanghai Communist Team, and helped to establish the Chinese Communist Party (CCP) in 1921. At first, he worked as a liaison for the party. He also wrote for the party magazine The Communist Party.

At the time, the CCP was allied with the Kuomintang in the First United Front. Mao Dun participated in Chiang Kai-shek's Northern Expedition to reunite the country. He quit, however, when Chiang's Kuomintang broke with the Communists in 1927. In July 1928, he went to Japan in order to take refuge. As he returned to China in 1930, he joined the League of Left-Wing Writers. Later, China went to war with Japan and he actively engaged in resisting the Japanese attack in 1937.

After the communists won the Chinese Civil War and established the People's Republic of China in 1949, Mao Dun worked as Mao Zedong's secretary and Culture Minister. During Mao Dun's tenure as minister of culture, Zhou Yang (who was head of the ministry's Arts Bureau and was the deputy head of the Communist Party's Propaganda Department) had substantial influence in the ministry.

In the early 1950s, cultural policy sought to revise the practices of Peking opera. Mao described the purpose of these policies as "to preserve and develop the positive traditions of old opera and eliminate the unreasonable and unrealistic aspects created by the prolonged effects of feudal society.

In 1965, Mao was replaced as minister of culture by Lu Dingyi.

== Literary career ==
As a literary man, Mao Dun had a great number of achievements. His reforms at Fiction Monthly were his first contribution to Chinese literature. The magazine then became a place where "New Literature" circulated. Many famous writers like Lu Xun, Xu Dishan, Bing Xin, Ye Shengtao, had their works published through it. Mao Dun supported movements such as "New Literature" and "New Thinking". He believed that Chinese literature should have a place in the world.

The experience of political conflict broadened his horizon in literature, therefore the theme of his later writing was mostly based on this. He helped to found the League of Left-Wing Writers in 1930. After that, he worked together with Lu Xun to fight for the right of the society and the revolutionary movement in literature. The harvest period of Mao Dun's writing is considered to have been from 1927 to 1937.

Shi (蚀), also translated in English as The Eclipse, was Mao's first novel. It was published in three volumes: Disillusions (幻灭, 1927), Wavering (动摇, 1928), and Pursuits (追求, 1928). It tells the story of a generation of young intellectuals caught up in the world of revolutionary fervor without a true understanding of the nature of social change. His next major work was Rainbow (虹, 1929), which became famous for having no less than 70 main characters and numerous plot twists and turns. In 1933 came his next work, Midnight, which gained great popularity, to a point that it was also published in French and English, and it allowed to develop a sense of revolutionary realism. It is a naturalistic novel exploring the commercial world of Shanghai in detail. In addition, his fiction offered a sympathetic portrayal of working-class life and praise of revolution. He left a work unfinished, the trilogy Shuangye Hongsi Eryuehua (霜叶红似二月花, 1942).

The League of Left-Wing Writers was dissolved in a quarrel in 1936. After the initiation of the Sino-Japanese War in 1937, Mao traveled to many places and started a literary magazine in Wuhan. He edited the periodical Literary Front and the literary page of the newspaper Libao in Hong Kong and worked as a teacher.

In May 1940, Mao and his family traveled to Yan'an. In Yan'an, he wrote essays praising the Communist Party's transformation of the region through both cultivation of culture and of labor.

After 1943 Mao Dun did not produce any major works, but still wrote some articles and essays. In 1946 he visited the Soviet Union.

When the People's Republic of China was established in 1949, he became active in several committees and he worked as the Secretary and then the Minister of Culture for Mao Zedong until 1965. He started the monthly literary journal Chinese Literature, which became the most popular for western readers. He was dismissed from his position as minister in 1964 due to the ideological upheavals. Despite this fact, Mao Dun survived the Cultural Revolution and was afterwards rehabilitated. In the 1970s he became an editor of a children's magazine, and began working on his memoirs, which were serialized in the Party publication, the quarterly Historical Materials on New literature (新文学史料), but he died on 27 March 1981, before he could finish it. His influence on Chinese literature continues to the present day because he used his savings to set up a fund called the Mao Dun Literature Scholarship to promote an atmosphere for writing fiction.

Mao Dun's achievements in literature were also seen at his 50th birthday, which was also the 25th anniversary of his literary life. More than five hundred guests came to celebrate with him. Russian and American friends also joined the celebration. Wong Roufei wrote an essay as congratulations on behalf of the Chinese Communist Party. Mao Dun's influence and achievements in the literary field were witnessed. On the other hand, he was twice elected as the chairman and then once elected as the vice-chairman of the China Literary Arts Representative Assembly. His status in the literary field has been highly recognized. Although he suffered great pain from illness in his old age, he still kept writing his memoirs, called The Road I Walked (我走过的路).

Besides his achievements, Mao Dun also had great influence on Chinese literature. The Mao Dun Literature Prize was created due to Mao Dun's wish that outstanding novels should be encouraged and communist literature should be promoted. It is one of the most honorable literature awards in China. Many famous modern Chinese literary authors like Wei Wei and Zhou Keqin have received the prize.

== Marriage and personal life ==
Mao Dun had a typical traditional Chinese marriage. His family got him engaged to the Kong family when he was five years old and he married the daughter of Kong family after he quit from university. After their marriage, the daughter of Kong family had been renamed as Kong Dezhi (孔德沚), and she would go on to assist Mao Dun with his literary and political career during their marriage. However, Mao had had a two-year long affair with Qin Dejun (秦德君) during his marriage, which is also believed to have effects on his novel Rainbow. In the end, Mao Dun ended the affair and returned to his own family.

== List of works ==
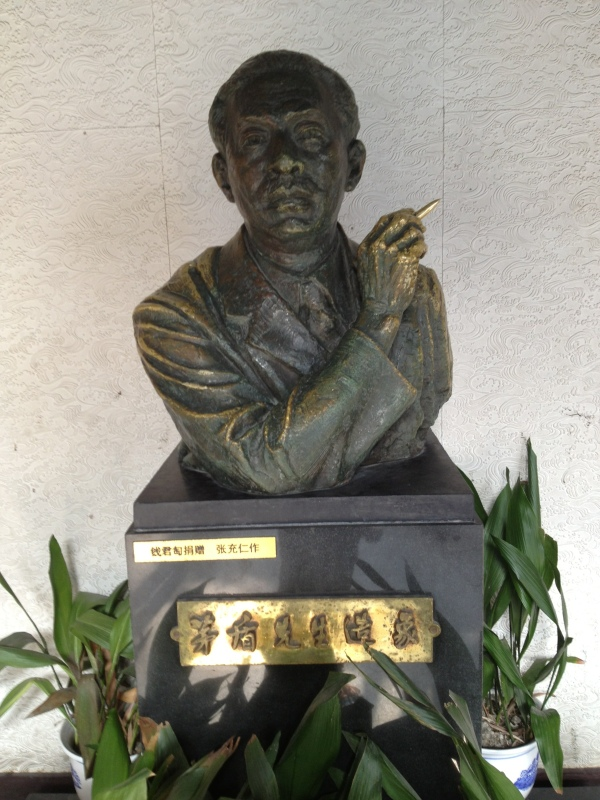
A bust of Mao Dun in his former residence in Wuzhen, Zhejiang.

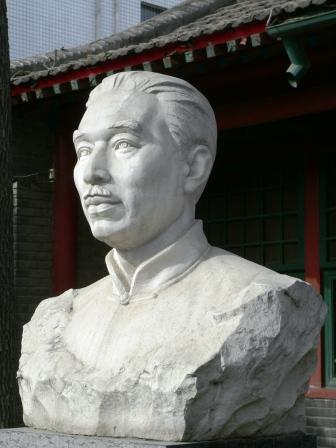
A bust of Mao Dun in his former residence in Beijing.

Mao Dun has over 100 publications throughout his life, which includes short stories, novels, theories etc. Some of his most famous works include:

=== Short stories ===
- Wild Rose (《野薔薇》 Ye Qiangwei (1929)
- The Smoke and Cloud Collection 《煙雲集》 Yanyunji (1937)

=== Novellas ===
- Disillusions 《幻滅》 Huanmie (1927)
- Wavering 《動搖》 Dongyao (1927)
- Pursuits 《追求》 Zhuiqiu (1928)
- Three people walking, 《三人行》 Sanrenxing (1931)
- The Shop Of the Lin Family 《林家铺子》 Linjia Puzi (1932)
- Spring Silkworms, 《春蚕》 Chuncan (1932)
- Autumn Harvest 《秋收》 QiuShou

=== Novels ===
- Rainbow 《虹》 Hong (1930)
- Midnight: A Romance of China, 1930 《子夜》Ziye (1933)
- Giving to the poet festival《獻給詩人節》Xian Gei Shi Ren Jie (1946)

=== Theories ===
- The recent works of Mao Dun《茅盾近作》Mao Dun Jin Zuo (1980)
- Mao Dun's comment on creativity《茅盾論創作》Mao Dun Lun Chuang Zuo (1980)

=== Essays ===
- "Travelling Diary of USSR"《蘇聯見聞錄》Su Lian Jian Wen Lu (1948)
- "Talks on USSR"《雜談蘇聯》Ji Tan Su Lian (1949)

=== Drama script ===
- Front and rear Pure Brightness, 《清明前後》QianMingQianHou (1945)

=== Translation ===
- Modern drama Russian Question 話劇《俄羅斯問題》(1946)
- Novelette Group's Son 中篇小說《團的兒子》(1946)

=== Others ===
- Works of Mao Dun《茅盾全集》Mao Dun Quanji (vol. 1–15, 1984–1987)
- Introduction to the books of Mao Dun《茅盾書簡》Mao Dun Shujian (1st edition, collection of letters, 1984) later changed the name into《茅盾書信集》 Mao Dun Shuxinji (1988)

== Transition of female characters ==
The 1930s is a turning point of the female characters' identity in Mao Dun's works. Between the 1920s and the 1930s, which was also the early period of Mao Dun's writing career, the female characters occurring in his works mostly were in identity of "New Woman", for instance, Mrs. Gui (桂阿姨) and Qionghua (琼华) in Wild Rose (野蔷薇, 1929), Ms. Mei (梅小姐) in Rainbow (虹, 1930).

However, from the 1930s, the "New Woman" characters in Mao Dun's works started to be replaced by the women who were living in traditional Chinese family. Furthermore, female characters even started to lose their own names. As in one of Mao Dun's short novels, which was released in the 1930s, Shui zaoxing (水藻行), the only female character did not even have an actual name but only be called as "Xiusheng (one of the two main male characters)'s wife (秀生妻)" in the novel.

== Sources ==
- Petri Liukkonen. "Mao Dun". Books and Writers.
- Bartleby.com article on Mao-Tun
- Encyclopedia.com article on Mao-Tun
- Yahoo Encyclopedia article on Mao-Tun
- Feng, Liping (April 1996). "Democracy and Elitism: The May Fourth Ideal of Literature". Modern China (Sage Publications, Inc.) 22 (2): 170–196. ISSN 0097-7004. JSTOR 189342.

Political offices
Preceded by none	Minister of Culture; 1949–1965	Succeeded by Lu Dingyi
Cultural offices
Preceded by none	Chairman of the China Writers Association; 1949–1981	Succeeded by Ba Jin
