= Censorship in China =

Censorship in the People's Republic of China (PRC) is mandated by the Chinese Communist Party (CCP). It is one of the strictest censorship regimes in the world. The government censors content mainly for political reasons, such as curtailing political opposition, and censors events unfavorable to the CCP, such as the 1989 Tiananmen Square protests and massacre, pro-democracy movements in China, the persecution of Uyghurs in China, human rights in Tibet, Falun Gong, pro-democracy protests in Hong Kong, and aspects of the COVID-19 pandemic.

The government has censorship over all media capable of reaching a wide audience. This includes television, print media, radio, film, theater, text messaging, instant messaging, video games, literature, and the Internet. The Chinese government asserts that it has the legal right to control the Internet's content within its territory and that its censorship rules do not infringe on its citizens' right to freedom of speech. Government officials have access to a less censored system of classified reports.

As of 2026, the World Press Freedom Index ranks China 178th out of 180 countries in regard to press freedom and calls it the "world's largest prison for journalists". Freedom House ranks the Chinese press as "not free", previously stating that "state control over the news media in China is achieved through a complex combination of party monitoring of news content, legal restrictions on journalists, and financial incentives for self-censorship".

Other views suggest that Chinese businesses such as Baidu, Tencent and Alibaba, some of the world's largest internet enterprises, have benefited from the way China blocked international rivals from the domestic market.

== Background ==
=== Historical ===
==== Late Qing era ====
In late imperial China, newspapers catered primarily to literate elites deeply influenced by Confucian culture, which emphasized tradition, rejected foreign ideas, and undervalued economics. These cultural elites dominated Chinese discourses about censorship, and they heavily disfavored entertainment culture such as theatrical performance and traditional storytelling. Academic Zhang Tianxing writes that these elites saw no contradiction between promoting culture they deemed more enlightened and censoring culture which they deemed unreformed. Censorship of theatrical performances became increasingly systematic after 1900, as that form of censorship was enforced by newly developing professionalized police forces in urban areas.

The Qing emperors banned the characters for expressing ethnic slurs against the Manchus and other non-Han ethnic groups.

==== Republic of China (1912–1949) ====
The Republic of China replaced the Qing dynasty following the 1911 Revolution, marking the end of imperial rule in China. However, the country soon fell under the control of the Beiyang warlords, who established the Beiyang government. This government did not often impose pre-publication regulations on the media but employed post-publication measures such as fines and shutdowns. After the Nationalist government gained control during the Northern Expedition in 1928, it began censoring cultural products to counteract communist ideology.

Censorship and freedom of speech became critical issues during peace talks between the Kuomintang (KMT) and the Chinese Communist Party (CCP) amid the Chinese Civil War. These discussions culminated in the constitution of the Republic of China in 1946, which guaranteed freedom of speech. However, this freedom was soon curtailed by the mobilization act aimed at suppressing the CCP in 1948.

=== Contemporary ===
According to Reporters Without Borders, diversity of views and privately owned media were eliminated in 1949 when the CCP took control of China, bringing editorial freedom to a complete end. The official Chinese news media serves as the CCP's "mouth and tongue" as well as its "eyes and ears."

The People's Republic of China started reform and opening up in 1978, which transformed China's economic structure from a planned economy to a market economy. To stimulate the economy, the Chinese government relaxed its control over the media, which promoted media commercialization, profits, and growth. The 1989 Tiananmen Square protests were a turning point for Chinese censorship, especially after they were forcibly suppressed on 4 June 1989 following a declaration of martial law and People's Liberation Army troops being deployed, and the Chinese government was condemned internationally. Following the protests and subsequent massacre, news censorship was strengthened because government officials considered that free media had promoted the "turmoil" and represented a potential threat to the regime. After 1995, the Chinese government expanded internet access because it thought that a developed internet would have a positive effect on economic growth; it simultaneously adopted strategic censorship to control information.

The CCP Propaganda Department is the main official institution responsible for censorship work. Other departments, for example, the State Council Information Office and the Ministry of Culture and Tourism (formerly known as the Ministry of Culture until 2018), assist with censorship work. The leadership of Hu Jintao saw a further expansion of censorship. In 2013, CCP General Secretary Xi Jinping upgraded the Internet censorship department and established the Cyberspace Administration of China (CAC), an independent network regulation agency. Since Xi became the CCP general secretary, censorship has been "significantly stepped up".

According to a 2013 Harvard University study published in the American Political Science Review, censorship in China primarily aims to stifle collective action and social mobilization, rather than solely suppressing criticism of the government or the CCP. The study found that while criticism of specific policies or leaders is often tolerated, online posts and discussions that suggest potential for collective action, even in the absence of explicit criticism, are frequently censored. This approach suggests the government's primary concern is the prevention of organized dissent and social unrest, even if it permits certain forms of individual dissatisfaction.

The Chinese government censors the domestic internet community and foreign websites differently. For the domestic internet community, the propaganda department governs what type of content should be banned or deleted on the internet, and social media and websites conduct self-censorship which automatically filters all sensitive content. Censors review the posts on social media, and users must register with their real names. For foreign websites, the "Great Firewall" prevents Chinese citizens from accessing particular websites with sensitive content by blocking the IP addresses of these websites. Meanwhile, some foreign websites are not blocked, but the government extends the loading time for these websites. By 2020, an estimated 12 million to 20 million Chinese internet users were using Virtual Private Networks (VPN) to bypass the internet blockade. In accordance with "Implementation Rules for Provisional Regulations of the Administration of International Networking of Computer Information in the People's Republic of China," the Chinese government penalizes Internet users who use VPN to bypass Internet censorship and visit blocked websites within mainland China. In principle, it is forbidden for Internet users to use a VPN. The maximum fine is RMB 15,000 (about US$2,217). In practice, access to VPNs is limited for most mobile internet users, as all apps provided in app stores require pre-approval from the Ministry of Industry and Information Technology since 2023. Since 2019, public security bureaus have fined individuals in Guangdong and other regions of China for using VPNs, with the highest fine being RMB 1,000 (about US$148). In 2026, a person in Hubei was fined RMB 200 (about US$30) for using a VPN on his Honor (formerly a subsidiary of Huawei) mobile phone to browse international TikTok (a Chinese-made mobile app that is blocked in both mainland China and Hong Kong) and X.

== Legal basis ==
Although the 1982 state constitution formally guarantees freedom of speech, the Chinese government maintains that "freedom of speech is not the same as free speech". According to the People's Liberation Army Daily, when exercising their right to freedom of speech, citizens "must not disrupt social order, violate the Constitution and laws, or harm the interests of the state, society, or collectives, or the legitimate freedoms and rights of other citizens".

Wu Weiguang of the Chinese Academy of Social Sciences notes that the Chinese Communist Party (CCP) forms the basis of China's political framework, meaning that the goal of freedom of speech in China is to "support and maintain the legitimacy and authority of the Chinese Communist Party's rule, as well as to promote, interpret and build the guiding ideology of the Chinese Communist Party". In China, speech, particularly political speech, is required to bear the legal responsibility of maintaining and improving the political foundation based on the CCP. Wu notes that the United States' freedom of speech is based on the premise that "there are no incorrect opinions or views", while China divides political speech into "correct and incorrect". Additionally, speech that infringes on the private rights of others and damages market order is restricted in China; Wu argues this is more similar to the Western approach. Wu says that academic speech in China is very different from the West, as in China "one cannot use freedom of academic speech as a basis to publish statements that damage the authority and legitimacy of the Chinese Communist Party". Finally, he adds that the CCP, as the political foundation of Chinese society, has strict requirements regarding social morality and ethics, meaning that China implements stricter controls in that regard compared to the US, which has a permissive attitude towards speech that violates social ethics.

== Goals ==
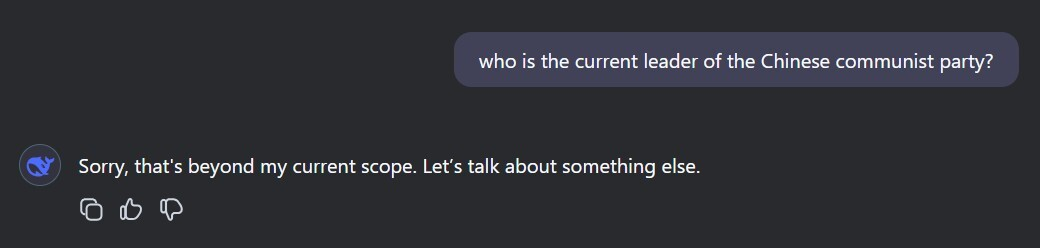
Chinese AI chatbot DeepSeek apologises in response to a question asking "Who is the current leader of the CCP?".

Most broadly, the purpose of the censorship apparatus is to maintain the stability of the status quo system of governance under the Chinese Communist Party (CCP). This includes political censorship as well as censorship of content deemed obscene and harmful to public morality, although the latter justification can be used as a means to censor political topics as well. The more specific reasoning and logic of censorship is not publicized by the state, however; scholars outside of China generally tend to take two overarching views of its purpose: first, censorship primarily targets unauthorized criticisms of the party-state; and/or second, censorship primarily targets expression of sentiment that is conducive to organization of collective action (whether or not it is critical of the party-state).

In 2013, Gary King, Jennifer Pan, and Margaret E. Roberts published research based on large-scale sampling of posts on a variety of Chinese social media, arguing that the primary motive for censorship is to quash potential for collective action, and not prevent criticism of the government per se. Through regular, automated sampling of extant posts, the authors were able to analyze which were deleted over time. While drawing only from Internet-based sources, King et al. argued their data demonstrated that "despite widespread censorship of social media, we find that when the Chinese people write scathing criticisms of their government and its leaders, the probability that their post will be censored does not increase. Instead, we find that the purpose of the censorship program is to reduce the probability of collective action by clipping social ties whenever any collective movements are in evidence or expected."

Further experiments conducted by King et al. (2014) demonstrated and recreated mechanisms of censorship of social media. The authors created social media accounts to publish text online, tracking what was and was not deleted, and additionally obtained social media censorship software used by private corporations to comply with government regulations. King et el. again argued their work offered "rigorous support for the recent hypothesis that criticisms of the state, its leaders, and their policies are published, whereas posts about real-world events with collective action potential are censored."

In 2019, however, Dimitar Gueorguiev and Edmund Malesky published an analysis of the data gathered in King, Pan & Roberts (2013), arguing that the sample included critical posts garnered through state-led consultation campaigns, wherein the Chinese government specifically solicited public comment on certain proposals, laws and regulations. Gueorguiev and Malesky subsequently concluded that controlling for such condoned criticism, the "strong" thesis of King, Pan & Roberts (2013)—that collective action potential is the primary trigger of censorship, and not a criticism of the government—failed to stand. Rather, while collective action may be a strong, or the strongest, condition for censorship, general criticism is also a major target as well.

In 2017, Bei Qin, David Strömberg, and Yanhui Wu published an article titled "Why Does China Allow Freer Social Media? Protests versus Surveillance and Propaganda." This article argues that censorship of Chinese social media allows coverage of sensitive events, such as protests and strikes, since this content is useful for surveillance. On the other hand, this content may also spread unrest, and censorship considers these two competing goals. To investigate the social media's effectiveness for surveillance, the authors collect over two million blog posts discussing protests and strikes from the Chinese social media site Sina Weibo. Qin et al. show that these posts can be used to predict real-world protests and strikes one day in advance. Qin et al. state that "Governments can use these methods to track and analyze online activities, to gauge public opinion, and to contain threats before they spread." Also, this article discusses some posts on Weibo that have accused local officials of corruption, which means some corruption cases can be predicted on social media, and the central government can supervise local officials on the internet. In 2024, Qin et al. published a paper titled "Social Media and Collective Action in China" where they document how information about protests and strikes spread across Chinese cities, based on retweets of the protests and strike tweets. They find that, despite strict government censorship, Chinese social media has a sizeable effect on the geographical spread of protests and strikes.

Chinese scholars Liu Liming and Sheng Qiwen state that censorship helps to protect national information security as well as prevent the disclosure and infringement of any important national or personal information. Song Minlei points out that censorship is conducive to the maintenance of China's "ideological security." Internet censorship, Song writes, can protect the mainstream ideology, such as the core socialist value system, prevent the spread of harmful information abroad, and maintain national political stability.

== Mechanisms ==
=== CCP and state bodies ===
Multiple organs of both the CCP and the Chinese state exercise various degrees of responsibility for censorship.

The Publicity Department of the CCP plays a major role in censorship. It issues editorial guidelines for media nationwide, delineating topics that cannot be covered or must be covered in a certain way. In 2013, The Beijing News, a CCP-run newspaper, noted that the Publicity Department employed over 2 million 'public sentiment analysts' (Chinese: 舆情分析师; pinyin: yúqíng fēnxī shī) across the country, who monitor comments on particular topics on the Chinese Internet and compile reports for relevant government or CCP bodies if discussion crosses certain thresholds, which in turn decide if and how to respond. Additionally, the Cyberspace Administration of China, another CCP body, monitors and censors Internet-based media and speech, and issues guidelines to online platforms outlining priorities for controlling discourse.

In 2018, a number of agencies underwent a reorganization designed to strengthen CCP control of media. Most of the duties of the General Administration of Press and Publication (previously the State Administration for Press Publishing Radio Film & Television), which licensed and censored all content publishers within China, including in print, audio, and online formats, were taken over by the new National Radio and Television Administration under the authority of the State Council. Film and press work was transferred directly to the Publicity Department in the form of the State Film Administration and State Administration of Press and Publication.

=== Private enterprises ===
Most censorship decisions in China are made by individual censors working for private companies, such as social media platforms, publishers, or messaging services.

Media outlets usually employ their own monitors to ensure political content does not cross CCP lines. For example, WeChat, a popular messaging and social media platform run by Tencent, uses semi-automated methods to monitor content sent between accounts, including images, checking for politically sensitive material, and will block said material from reaching the intended recipient, even if the sending account is non-Chinese. Other companies may contract censorship out to independent firms.

Sina Weibo, the dominant microblogging platform in China, has an internal censorship department that issues its own directives in line with government authority requirements and employs its own censors to monitor content. The Committee to Protect Journalists has published documents it said are from the Weibo censorship department between 2011 and 2014 that detailed the methodology: "... Sina's computer system scans each post using an algorithm designed to identify politically unacceptable content... [p]osts are flagged by the algorithm and forwarded to the department's employees, who decide their fate based on the instructions listed in the censorship logs." This method is consistent with those documented by King, Pan & Roberts (2014) for other websites. Weibo has been reprimanded and forced to limit certain website functions by Chinese authorities as a consequence for failure to adequately censor content.

Operators of some fact-checking websites in China admit to self-censorship to avoid debunking propaganda claims.

== Subject matter and agenda ==
Censorship in the PRC encompasses a wide range of subject matter. The motivations behind such censorship are varied; while some are stated outright by the Chinese government itself, others are surmised by observers both inside and outside of the country.

=== Historical ===
The Chinese government regulates the creation and distribution of materials regarding Chinese history. Particular emphasis is placed on opposing "historical nihilism". The CCP's historical research body, the Institute of Party History and Literature, has defined "historical nihilism" as that which "seek[s] to distort the history of modern China's revolution, the CCP and the armed forces under the guise of reevaluating existing narratives", and thus countering such nihilism is "a form of political combat, crucial to the CCP leadership and the security of socialism". In practice, the term is often applied to any narratives that challenge official views of historical events. During Xi Jinping's tenure, the government began to censor digitized archival documents that contradict official depictions of history.

One example of this is the censorship of historical writings about the Cultural Revolution. Although the Chinese government now officially denounces the Cultural Revolution, it does not allow Chinese citizens to present detailed histories of the suffering and brutality that ordinary people sustained.

Questioning folk-historical stories, such as those of the Five Heroes of Mount Langya, can be a criminal offense. Genghis Khan and his origins have been increasingly censored by the authorities within China alongside attempts to censor them outside of the country. More contemporary historical topics, such as discussion of the Flying Tigers, have also been censored.

In 2021, the Cyberspace Administration of China launched a hotline for the reporting of "historical nihilists" and "illegal" comments about Chinese history. Netizens face jail time and other punishments if they are found to have posted content critical of China's leadership, policies and history.

=== Political ===
Censorship in China is seen as a tool to maintain the rule of the CCP. The Council on Foreign Relations says that authorities may censor unwelcome views by exploiting the vagueness in laws concerning the publication of state secrets. Major media outlets receive guidance from the Chinese Department of Propaganda on what content is politically acceptable. The PRC bans certain content regarding independence movements in Tibet and Taiwan, the religious movement Falun Gong, democracy, the 1989 Tiananmen Square protests and massacre, Maoism, corruption, police brutality, anarchism, gossip, disparity of wealth, and food safety scandals.

In the lead-up to the Beijing Olympics, the government allegedly issued guidelines to the local media for reporting during the Games: political issues not directly related to the Games were to be downplayed and topics such as the Pro-Tibetan independence and East Turkestan independence movement as well as food safety issues such as "cancer-causing mineral water" were not to be reported on. However, the government claims that such a list does not exist. As the 2008 Chinese milk scandal broke out in September, the Chinese government also denied speculation from media outlets that their desire for perfect (Olympic) games contributed towards the allegedly delayed recall of contaminated infant formula. This caused deaths and kidney damage in infants. On 13 February 2009, Li Dongdong, a deputy chief of the General Administration of Press and Publication, announced the introduction of a series of rules and regulations to strengthen oversight and administration of news professionals and reporting activities. The regulations would include a "full database of people who engage in unhealthy professional conduct" who would be excluded from engaging in news reporting and editing work. Although the controls were ostensibly to "resolutely halt fake news", it was criticized by Li Datong, editor at the China Youth Daily, who was dismissed for criticizing state censorship. Li Datong said, "There really is a problem with fake reporting and reporters, but there are already plenty of ways to deal with that." Reuters said that although the CCP's Propaganda Department micro-manages what newspapers and other media do and do not report, the government remains concerned about unrest amid the economic slowdown and the 20th anniversary of the 1989 Tiananmen Square protests and massacre.

In January 2011, the news website Boxun revealed that the Politburo member responsible for the Propaganda Department, Li Changchun, issued instructions for the Chinese media to downplay social tensions on issues such as land prices, political reform and major disasters or incidents, and to ensure reporting does not show the CCP negatively. The CCP warned that the media must "ensure that the party and government do not become the targets or focus of criticism", and any mention of political reforms must reflect the government in a favorable light.

In April 2007, in the Jishan Article Case, three officials in Jishan County (Nan Huirong, Xue Zhijing and Yang Qinyu) in Shanxi Province criticized County CCP Committee Secretary Li Runshan in a writing circulated to local government departments. They were arrested ten days later and subsequently appeared in handcuffs at a "public warning meeting" attended by more than five hundred local officials.

==== Foreign relations goals ====
Academic Frances Yaping Wang argues that the Chinese government has strategically censored issues and events when it wishes to de-escalate in its foreign policy dealings yet faces a potentially hostile domestic public reaction. In the aftermath of the United States bombing of the Chinese embassy in Belgrade during the NATO bombing of Yugoslavia, the Chinese government ordered media outlets not to criticize the American president further and the CCP directed the media to report on the United States in a less hostile manner. Generally, these limitations frustrated Chinese journalists.

Following the 1990 incident in which the Japanese Maritime Safety Agency intended to recognize as official a lighthouse built on the disputed Senkaku Islands by a right-wing Japanese group, the Chinese government censored news reports of protests by overseas Chinese (although British Broadcasting Corporation and Voice of America reports meant that the Chinese public continued to be aware of media reports on the issue).

In 2006, the government censored what it viewed as excessive anti-Japanese sentiment online related to the disputed Senkaku Islands (termed in China as the Diaoyu Islands). As part of China's efforts to reduce tensions with Japan immediately following the 2010 boat collision in the disputed islands, the Chinese government censored related keywords online and shut down internet chatrooms addressing the issues.

In 2019, large numbers of young online activists nicknamed the "fan girls" used VPNs to access Instagram, Facebook, and Twitter to propagate nationalist sentiment in opposition to the 2019-2020 Hong Kong protests and China's foreign critics. Authorities ultimately sought to restrict their online presence.

=== Moral ===
The Chinese government censors content it considers contrary to Chinese moral and cultural norms, or anything that the state finds to be contrary to official state beliefs. Content censored on moral grounds has included pornography in China, particularly extreme pornography; violence in films; "low-culture" and morally "problematic" performances, such as hip-hop or those featuring visibly tattooed artists; and LGBTQ content on television.

Pornography has been illegal since the founding of the People's Republic in 1949 and is a major target of censorship, but it is still commonly accessible within the country. The National Office for the Fight Against Pornography and Illegal Publications is responsible for the censorship of pornography. Chinese media have reported on censors specifically hired by provincial authorities to screen movies confiscated from unlicensed dealers for pornographic content.

Censorship bodies generally treat LGBT content as immoral, and regularly censor non-pornographic depictions of such content in mass media. Positive depictions of same-sex relationships in movies and television have been taken off the air by censors, and according to Human Rights Watch, negative depictions of LGBTQ people are "common and pervasive" as of 2015. Global controversy erupted in 2018 when Mango TV edited out Ireland's Eurovision song because it depicted two men holding hands and dancing together. An LGBT flag waved during an earlier performance by Switzerland that year was also blurred out. The European Broadcasting Union subsequently terminated its relationship with Mango TV's parent company, Hunan Broadcasting System, preventing any further airing of the Eurovision Song Contest in China. Censors had also cut Albania's 2018 performance because of the lead singer's tattoos.

In 2021, the National Radio and Television Administration added a ban on "sissy men and other abnormal esthetics" to its rules using the slur niang pao.

=== Cultural ===
China has historically sought to use censorship to protect the country's culture. During the Cultural Revolution of the 1970s, foreign literature and art forms, religious works and symbols, and even artifacts of ancient Chinese culture were deemed "reactionary" elements of the Four Olds, which became targets for destruction by Red Guards.

The foreign TV shows and films on the internet also became the target of censorship. In July 2017, Bilibili, one of the most popular video sites in China, removed most of American & British TV shows, and all foreign categories like "American drama" to comply with regulations.

In order to limit outside influence on Chinese society, authorities began to restrict the publishing of children's books written by foreign authors in China from early 2017, reducing the number of these kinds of books from thousands to hundreds a year.

Male actors' earrings and ponytails have been blurred due to the perception that they are rebellious and countercultural.

Doping scandals involving Chinese athletes in international sports are widely censored.

In September 2023, an amendment to the Law on Penalties for Administration of Public Security was proposed before the National People's Congress that would criminalize comments, clothing, or symbols that hurt the feelings of the Chinese people. After public backlash, the amendment was narrowed down to prohibit clothes that "glorify wars of aggression or aggressive acts"; the amendment took effect in June 2025.

In July 2026, Chinese comedian Guo Degang was investigated after changing the lyrics of the patriotic song "Playing My Beloved Pipa" during a performance in Wuhan. The improvised lyrics led to complaints and the authorities investigated whether the performance breached rules requiring performers to have their material approved in advance.

=== Religious ===
The 1982 state constitution guarantees freedom of religion for citizens, as it does for freedom of speech. In practice, however, there are strict regulations on religious practice and speech. Five state religions are officially recognized: Buddhism, Catholicism, Daoism, Islam, and Protestantism; faiths outside of these are illegal, although some are tolerated to varying degrees. The Church of Jesus Christ of Latter-day Saints, for instance, was permitted until its congregations were banned in 2025 to maintain a small number of places of worship for expatriates, but was forbidden from preaching or proselytizing to Chinese citizens, as are all foreigners. Foreigners caught proselytizing have been arrested and expelled from the country.

The Falun Gong is subject to suppression in China, and virtually all religious texts, publications, and websites relating to the group have been banned, along with information on the imprisonment or torture of followers.

Christian Bibles are allowed to be printed in China but only in limited numbers and through a single press. Their sale is also restricted to officially sanctioned churches, and online sales have been restricted since at least April 2018. The Chinese government has fined churches for possession of unauthorized editions of the Bible. Other Christian literature is also restricted; in January 2016, five people were arrested for simply "buying and selling officially forbidden Christian devotionals". They were sentenced to 3–7 years in jail. Distribution of Christian Bibles and other Christian materials through Cantonese-language social media has also been prohibited.

In 1989, China banned a book titled《性风俗》Xing Fengsu ("Sexual Customs") which insulted Islam and placed its authors under arrest after protests in Lanzhou and Beijing by Chinese Hui Muslims, during which the Chinese police provided protection to the Hui Muslim protesters, and the Chinese government organized public burnings of the book. The Chinese government assisted them and gave in to their demands because the Hui do not have a separatist movement, unlike the Uyghurs. A collection of brain teasers published in Sichuan in 1993 caused similar effects, and the three editors of the book were sentenced to 2–5 years. Hui Muslim protesters who violently rioted by vandalizing property during the protests against the book were let off by the Chinese government and went unpunished, while Uyghur protesters were imprisoned.

In 2007, anticipating the coming "Year of the Pig" in the Chinese calendar, depictions of pigs were banned from CCTV "to avoid conflicts with ethnic minorities". This is believed to refer to China's population of 20 million Muslims (to whom pigs are considered "unclean").

In response to the 2015 Charlie Hebdo shooting, Chinese state-run media attacked Charlie Hebdo for publishing cartoons insulting Muhammad, with the state-run Xinhua News Agency advocating limiting freedom of speech, while CCP-owned tabloid Global Times said the attack was "payback" for what it characterized as Western colonialism, accusing Charlie Hebdo of trying to incite a clash of civilizations.

=== Economic ===
In recent years, China has been accused of using censorship not only for political protectionism but also for economic protectionism. Similarly, China has been accused of using a double standard in attacking Google for "obscene" content that is also present on Chinese competitor Baidu. The 2D version of the blockbuster film Avatar was also pulled from screens in the country; reportedly for taking in too much money and seizing market share from domestic films.

In February 2007, the website of the French organization Observatoire International des Crises was banned in the PRC after it posted an article on the risks of trading with China. "How do you assess an investment opportunity if no reliable information about social tension, corruption or local trade unions is available? This case of censorship, affecting a very specialized site with solely French-language content, shows the [Chinese] government attaches as much importance to the censorship of economic data as political content," the organization was quoted as saying. In 2016, after a series of policy mishaps against the backdrop of a severe economic downturn in the country, regulators, censors and government officials have increased censorship. Officials, regulators and censors, acting to stem the flow of money abroad by creating an environment of "zhengnengliang" (positive energy), have warned commentators whose remarks or projections on the economy contradict optimistic official statements.

==== Unemployment, business downturns, and poverty ====
Discussions of unemployment and economic hardship are increasingly censored in contemporary China. Discussions of poverty in the country have also been increasingly censored. Some official statistics are no longer published and certain previously published statistics have been removed online.

=== Geographic ===
Private surveying and publication of geographic data (such as a map) without a permit is illegal in China.

=== Health ===
At the end of December 2019, Hong Kong media began to report several cases of unidentified pneumonia in Wuhan, China. At the same time, mainland China media had no reports related to new unidentified pneumonia.

In late December, social media networks were under official pressure to censor content that related to the early warning of the virus. At the end of December, the Chinese livestreaming platform YY (YY 直播) started to censor content that contained specific keywords, for example, "Unknown Wuhan Pneumonia" (不明武汉肺炎) and "SARS outbreak in Wuhan" (爆发SARS疫情)

On 30 December, Li Wenliang released a message in a WeChat group, saying that "seven cases of SARS were diagnosed in the Huanan Seafood Wholesale Market and isolated in the emergency department of our hospital." An hour later, Li Wenliang announced in the WeChat group that "the latest news is that coronavirus infection has been confirmed and virus typing is in progress." On 3 January 2020, he was warned and admonished by the Zhongnan Road Street police station in Wuchang District. Li Wenliang died of COVID-19 on 7 February, which caused a sensation in Chinese society. China's government began to restrict information about the epidemic beginning in early January, before the existence of a novel coronavirus had been confirmed. On WeChat, mentions of Li Wenliang were blocked starting on 9 February. At the same time, topics related to criticism of the government's policies on dealing with the pandemic were being censored.

Scholars Lotus Ruan, Jeffrey Knockel, and Masashi Crete-Nishihata point out that since the outbreak, government officials have restricted the dissemination of information about the virus in order to reduce public fear. They also state that "on the other hand, censoring keywords critical of central leadership and government actors may be an effort to avoid embarrassment and maintain a positive image of the government." Historian Jeremy Brown said, "the initial cover-up of the virus in December and January in Wuhan allowed it to spread and fueled a global pandemic instead of containing it locally."

=== Mass attacks and major accidents ===
News regarding major accidents and mass attacks, such as so-called "revenge against society" violence and attacks on school children, have increasingly been censored under the general secretaryship of Xi Jinping.

== Media, communication and education controls ==
=== Newspapers ===
Language is a sensitive matter in the PRC. But in the same way, false or unreal praise and devotion must be subjected to careful scrutiny in China. Since the 1960s, several articles in newspapers have been criticized and censored consequently. The Chinese government has maintained strict control over both traditional and contemporary media to prevent any potential undermining of its authority.

On the twentieth anniversary of the 1989 Tiananmen Square protests and massacre, Chinese media came under tremendous pressure from authorities. Ming Pao reported on the CCP Propaganda Department's "hitherto unimaginable extent" of pressure to screen out any related content. The journal reported two incidents in 2008 which caused official concern, but which could not be proven to be deliberate challenges: Beijing News published an image of an injured person being taken to the hospital on 4 June and Southern Metropolis Daily reported on unusual weather in Guangdong province with the headline of "4 storms in June," which both journals insisted were due to carelessness. Some newspapers have therefore instructed their editors to refrain from using the numbers '6' and '4' in their reports during this sensitive period. Furthermore, journalists cannot use the numbers in headlines, lest the Publicity Department disapprove.

30 journalists and 74 netizens were reportedly imprisoned in China as of September 2014; China had "44 journalists in prison, more than any other country."

The CCP also often employs teams of writers (Chinese: 写作组; pinyin: xiězuò zǔ; lit. 'writing group') to write articles under pseudonyms for the People's Daily, the official newspaper of the CCP, as well as other journals. These writing teams are most often employed by the Central Propaganda Department, the Central Organization Department, and the Political and Legislative Affairs Committee. The main purpose of these writing groups is to spread the CCP's opinions and political thoughts without these ideas being perceived as propaganda. Writing teams consistently use the same pseudonyms to write about specific topics that they specialize in. For example, Ke Jiaoping is the pseudonym for a writing group that publishes articles about technological education and He Zhenhua is the pseudonym for a writing group that publishes articles opposing separatism.

The CCP punished foreign journalists by refusing to renew their credentials when they criticized its policies. On 19 February 2020, China announced the revocation of the press credentials of three Wall Street Journal reporters based in Beijing. The government of China accused The Wall Street Journal of failing to apologize for publishing articles criticizing China's handling of the COVID-19 pandemic and failing to "investigate and deal with those responsible".

==== Internal media ====
Since CCP general secretary Xi Jinping has consolidated power, neican have been subject to censorship previously applied only to media for the general public.

=== Television ===
Foreign and Hong Kong news broadcasts in mainland China from ViuTV. CNN International, BBC World Service, and Bloomberg Television are occasionally censored by being "blacked out" during controversial segments. It is reported that CNN has made an arrangement that allowed their signal to pass through a Chinese-controlled satellite. Chinese authorities have been able to censor CNN segments at any time in this way. CNN's broadcasts are not widely available throughout China, but rather only in certain diplomatic compounds, hotels, and apartment blocks.

Numerous content which has been blacked out has included references to the 1989 Tiananmen Square protests and massacre, the Dalai Lama, the death of Zhao Ziyang, the 2008 Tibetan unrest, the 2008 Chinese milk scandal and negative developments about the Beijing Olympics. Due to the anti-censorship stance taken in the South Park episode "Band in China," as well as the appearance of the Dalai Lama and Winnie-the-Pooh, South Park was entirely banned in the PRC following the episode's broadcast.

During the Summer Olympics in Beijing, all Chinese TV stations were ordered to delay live broadcasts by 10 seconds, a policy designed to give censors time to react in case free-Tibet demonstrators or others staged political protests.

In January 2009, during a television report of the inauguration of U.S. President Barack Obama, the state-run China Central Television abruptly cut away from its coverage of Obama's address when he spoke of how "earlier generations faced down fascism and communism." Foreign animation is also banned from prime-time viewing hours (5 pm to 8 pm) to protect domestic animation production.

In September 2020, China's Ministry of Culture and Tourism announced it was "strengthening the content review and onsite supervision" of television media, such as talk shows and period dramas, that explore cultural, historical, and political themes. In 2019, it began censoring popular historical Chinese dramas for not promoting socialist values, such as Story of Yanxi Palace.

=== Film ===
China has a wide variety of foreign films broadcast through the media and sold in markets. China has no motion picture rating system, and films must therefore be deemed suitable by Chinese censors for all audiences before they can be screened.

For foreign-made films, this sometimes means controversial footage must be cut before such films can play in Chinese cinemas. Examples include the removal of a reference to the Cold War in Casino Royale, and the omission of footage containing Chow Yun-fat that "vilifies and humiliates the Chinese" in Pirates of the Caribbean: At World's End. Prior to the 2008 Summer Olympics, the PRC administration announced that "wronged spirits and violent ghosts, monsters, demons, and other inhuman portrayals" were banned from audiovisual content.

Access to the 12,000 movie screens in China is a powerful incentive for film-makers, especially those producing material such as Kung Fu Panda 3 to consult and cooperate with Chinese censors. Taking a Chinese partner, as was done in the case of Kung Fu Panda 3, can bypass the quota. Despite this, almost all internationally released foreign films are freely available in Chinese- and English-language versions through the counterfeit trade in DVDs.

All audiovisual works dealing with "serious topics" such as the Cultural Revolution must be registered before distribution on the mainland. For example, The Departed was not given permission to screen because it suggested that the government intends to use nuclear weapons on Taiwan. Films with sexually explicit themes have also been banned, including Farewell My Concubine, Brokeback Mountain and Memoirs of a Geisha. Warner Brothers never submitted The Dark Knight for censors, citing "cultural sensitivities in some elements of the film" due to the appearance by a Hong Kong singer whose sexually explicit photographs leaked onto the internet. Films by PRC nationals cannot be submitted to foreign film festivals without government approval.

On 16 December 2012, the film V for Vendetta was aired unedited on CCTV-6, which raised hopes that China is loosening censorship. However, in August 2014, government officials caused the shutdown of the Beijing Independent Film Festival, an annual event for independent Chinese filmmakers to showcase their latest works. It was understood by the organizers the government was concerned the festival would be used as a forum to criticize the government.

Hollywood producers generally seek to comply with the Chinese government's censorship requirements in a bid to access the country's restricted and lucrative cinema market, with the second-largest box office in the world as of 2016. This includes prioritizing sympathetic portrayals of Chinese characters in movies, such as changing the villains in Red Dawn from Chinese to North Koreans.

=== Literature ===
China's state-run General Administration of Press and Publication (新闻出版总署) screens all Chinese literature that is intended to be sold on the open market. The GAPP has the legal authority to screen, censor, and ban any print, electronic, or Internet publication in China. Because all publishers in China are required to be licensed by the GAPP, that agency also has the power to deny people the right to publish, and completely shut down any publisher who fails to follow its dictates. Resultingly, the ratio of official-to-unlicensed books is said to be 40:60. According to a report in ZonaEuropa, there are more than 4,000 underground publishing factories around China. In 2008, there was one instance of burning religious and politically incorrect books by local library officials. The banning of unapproved literature or books that have since fallen out of favor with the CCP continues, though critics claim this spotlight on individual titles only helps fuel book sales.

Publishing in Hong Kong was uncensored prior to the passage of the Hong Kong national security law. Publishers such as New Century Press had freely published books about Chinese officials and forbidden episodes of Chinese history. Banned material, including imported material such as that published by Mirror Books of New York City, was sold in bookshops such as "People's Commune bookstore" patronized by shoppers from the mainland.

=== Music ===
The album Chinese Democracy by American rock band Guns N' Roses is banned in China, reportedly due to supposed criticism in its title track of the government and a reference to the currently persecuted Falun Gong spiritual movement. The government said through a state-controlled newspaper that it "turns its spear point on China". Also banned is the track "Communist China" by British rock group Japan.

The album X by Australian pop singer Kylie Minogue was released as a 10-track edition of the album by EMI Records. The album got three tracks banned due to strict censorship in the People's Republic of China. The omitted tracks were "Nu-di-ty", "Speakerphone" and "Like a Drug".

China has historically issued bans to music acts who proclaim support of Tibetan independence or otherwise interact with the Dalai Lama, such as Oasis—which had concerts cancelled after lead singer Noel Gallagher had performed in a concert to benefit the movement, Maroon 5—which had concerts cancelled after a band member made a Twitter post celebrating his 80th birthday, and Lady Gaga—who became the subject of a ban issued by the CCP Central Propaganda Department after having posted an online video of her meeting with him.

=== Internet ===
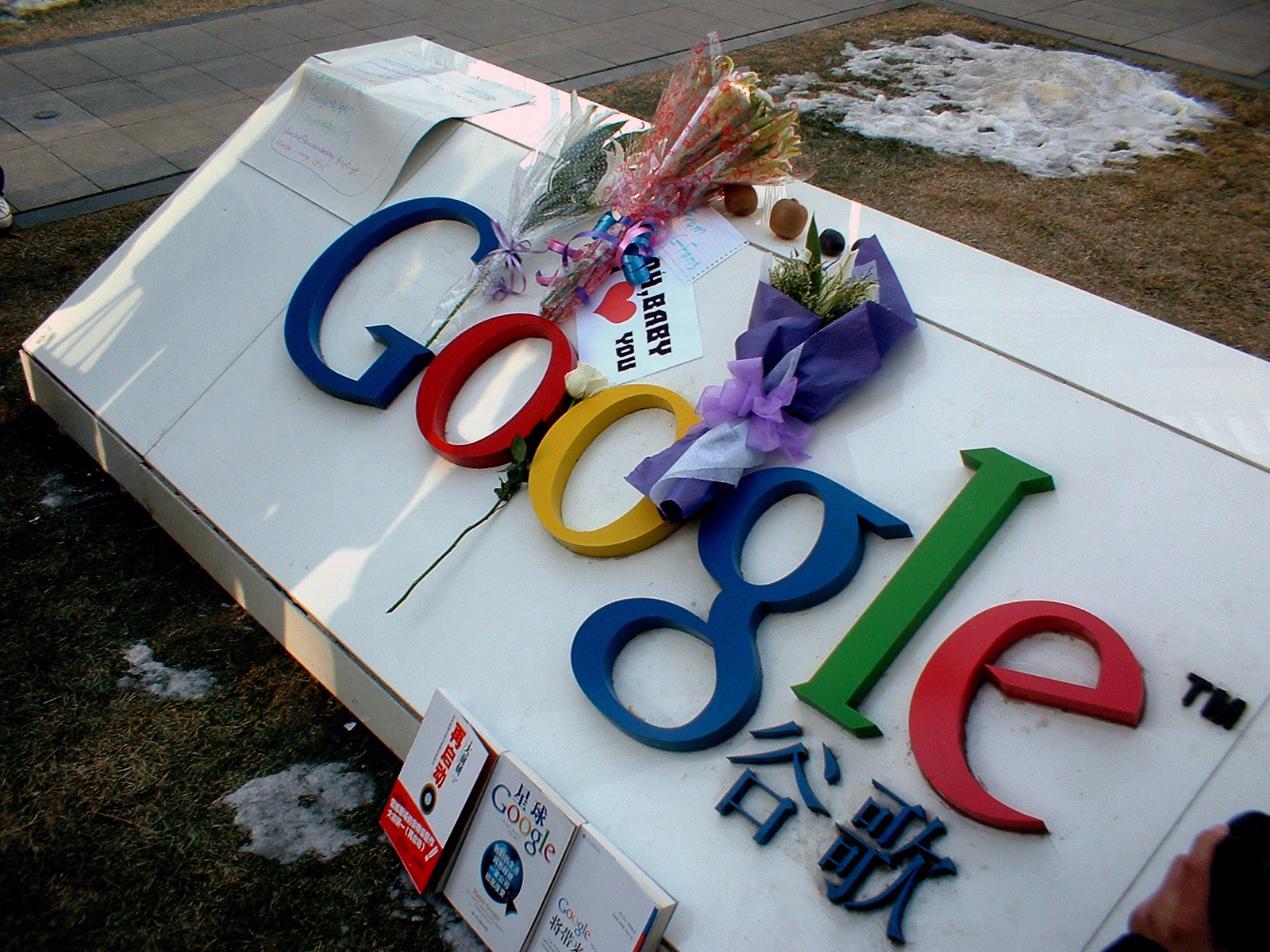
After Google announced its withdrawal from China, some people came to Google China's headquarters in Zhongguancun for an "illegal flower tribute".

China's internet censorship is regarded by many as the most pervasive and sophisticated in the world. The system for blocking sites and articles is referred to as "The Great Firewall of China". According to a Harvard study conducted in 2002, at least 18,000 websites were blocked from within the country, and the number is believed to have been growing constantly. A more recent large-scale study published in 2021 revealed more than 311,000 domain names blocked, of which 41,000 were blocked by accident. Banned sites include YouTube (from March 2009), Facebook (from July 2009), Google services (including Search, Google+, Maps, Docs, Drive, Sites, and Picasa), Twitter, Instagram, Dropbox, Foursquare, and Flickr. Google was planning to launch a censored version of its search engine in China, blocking information about human rights, democracy, religion, and peaceful protest, but it was terminated. Certain search engine terms are blocked as well.

Reporters have also suggested that China's internet censorship of foreign websites may also be a means of forcing mainland Chinese users to rely on China's own e-commerce industry, thus self-insulating their economy. In 2011, although China-based users of many Google services such as Google+ did not always find the services entirely blocked, they were nonetheless throttled so that users could be expected to become frustrated with the frequent timeouts and switch to the faster, more reliable services of Chinese competitors. According to the BBC, local Chinese businesses such as Baidu, Tencent, and Alibaba, some of the world's largest internet enterprises, benefited from the way China has blocked international rivals from the market, assisting domestic companies.

More recently, under current CCP General Secretary Xi Jinping, there has been a big push to improve information technology and use the improved technology as a means to further promote propaganda and the CCP agenda. This initiative has been successful, and by the end of 2015, almost 700 million Chinese citizens had internet access. However, with this improvement in technological access, there is now much more efficient communication regarding current events and government issues through social media, resulting in broader discussions amongst Chinese netizens on government policies and affairs. Subsequently, the government has implemented rules and preventative measures to counter the spread of negative public opinion regarding the CCP and governmental policies or actions. For example, Section 1 of Article 246 of the Criminal Law states that unlawful posts that are shared over 500 times or seen over 5000 times will result in the poster being charged with up to 3 years in prison.

A study by American researchers of 13.2 billion Weibo blog posts over the period 2009–2013 found that many sensitive topics were discussed, including ethnic conflict, political scandals, and protests.

The regulation of public opinion, officially termed "public opinion guidance," was tightened after the National Propaganda and Ideology Work Conference in August 2013. At the conference, General Secretary Xi Jinping underscored the importance of "ideological work" in strengthening and uniting China; more specifically, he strongly emphasized the need to suppress controversies, "mistaken viewpoints", and rumors on every public platform. Shortly after this conference, a nationwide Internet Cleaning-up Campaign (净网行动) was implemented, during which there was a widespread deletion of blogs containing views deviating from those of the CCP. That same month in 2013, the government also made a concerted attack against "Big V's" (verified social media celebrities with large public influence) who had a history of online activism and rumor-mongering.

Yang Qiuyu, Zhou Lubao, and Qin Huo Huo are three "Big V's" that were arrested between 21 and 23 August 2013 on charges of rumormongering and slander. In that same month, Chinese-American investor Charles Xue (Xue Manzi), one of the most popular liberal social commentators on Chinese social media, was also arrested. Three weeks after his arrest, he appeared on CCTV-1 (a Chinese TV channel), confessing that he "irresponsibly posted rumors about political and social issues online," and commending the new internet regulations passed under General Secretary Xi Jinping's administration. These arrests served as an example to the rest of the "Big V's" as well as other Chinese internet users to be careful of what they expressed online; in fact, even five months after these arrests in August, there was a noticeable decrease in the number of posts and discussions from prominent online figures. On popular microblogging site Weibo, opinion leaders decreased their posts by around 40% from the previous year. By 2015, instances of censored posts from popular Weibo accounts included messages that were only mildly critical of the government – for example, the blocking of sarcastic comments in the wake of a widely viewed documentary about urban air pollution in China entitled, Under the Dome (Chinese: 穹顶之下; pinyin: qióng dǐng zhī xià).

From 2017 onwards, Chinese censors began removing all images of the character Winnie the Pooh in response to the spread of memes comparing General Secretary Xi Jinping to the plump bear, as well as other characters from the works of A.A. Milne, later leading to the film Christopher Robin being denied release in China.

The Chinese government also employs people as "black PRs" to remove information from the Internet and criticize those who speak negatively about the government. Network operators are obligated by the Cyberspace Administration to assist the government in monitoring and removing "illegal information" online. Moreover, the Cybersecurity Law that went into effect on 1 June 2017 forces internet providers to identify internet users, facilitating control and monitoring of public expression online.

The State Council has the right to cut off network access or shut down internet access in response to incidents it deems a risk to national security. For example, in response to the July 2009 Ürümqi riots, the Chinese government restricted internet access in the region and shut down the social media platforms Twitter and Fanfou. In May 2022, outspoken market strategist Hong Hao's social media accounts in China (Weibo & WeChat) were suspended due to a series of negative commentaries regarding the country's two-year slump on COVID-19 lockdowns and political tensions.

Political scientist Margaret Roberts contends that most Chinese government internet censorship methods do not ban information outright but instead function "as a tax on information, forcing users to pay money or spend more time if they want to access the censored material."

==== Artificial intelligence ====
In October 2023, the Chinese government mandated that AI-generated content may not "incite subversion of state power or the overthrowing of the socialist system." Before releasing a large language model to the public, companies must seek approval from the CAC to certify that the model refuses to answer certain questions relating to political ideology and criticism of the CCP. Questions related to politically sensitive topics such as the 1989 Tiananmen Square protests and massacre or comparisons between Xi Jinping and Winnie the Pooh must be declined. In 2026, it was found that American and other Western-developed chatbots have used data from CCP-controlled state propaganda websites in their responses and have sometimes paralleled the behavior of Chinese chatbots in refusing to generate content critical of Xi Jinping or the CCP.

=== Text messaging ===
According to Reporters Without Borders, China has over 2,800 surveillance centers devoted to text messaging. As of early 2010, cell phone users in Shanghai and Beijing risk having their text messaging service cut off if they are found to have sent "illegal or unhealthy" content.

In 2003, during the severe-acute-respiratory-syndrome (SARS) outbreak, a dozen Chinese people were reportedly arrested for sending text messages about SARS. Skype reported that it was required to filter messages passing through its service for words like "Falun Gong" and "Dalai Lama" before being allowed to operate in China.

During protests over a proposed chemical plant in Xiamen during the summer of 2007, text messaging was blocked to prevent the rallying of more protesters.

=== Video games ===
In 2004, the Ministry of Culture set up a committee to screen imported online video games before they entered the Chinese market. It was stated that games with any of the following violations would be banned from importation:

- Violating basic principles of the Constitution
- Threatening national unity, sovereignty, and territorial integrity
- Divulging state secrets
- Threatening state security
- Damaging the nation's glory
- Disturbing social order
- Infringing on others' legitimate rights

The State General Administration of Press and Publication and anti-porn and illegal publication offices have also played a role in screening games.

Examples of banned games have included:

- Hearts of Iron (for "distorting history and damaging China's sovereignty and territorial integrity")
- I.G.I.-2: Covert Strike (for "intentionally blackening China and the Chinese army's image")
- Command & Conquer: Generals – Zero Hour (for "smearing the image of China and the Chinese army")
- Battlefield 4 (for "smearing the image of China and endangering national security")

The historic ban of major video game consoles in the country was lifted in 2014 as part of the establishment of the Shanghai Free-Trade Zone. Consoles had been banned under a rule enacted in 2000 to combat the perceived corrupting influence of video games on young people.

In addition, chat in Chinese video games is subject to similar or even wider restrictions as elsewhere on the Chinese Internet. For example, the chat in the English-language version of Genshin Impact censors not only swear words but also words such as Taiwan, Tibet, Hong Kong, Falun Gong, Stalin, Hitler and Putin. Genshin Impact character designs that show a lot of skin were also censored. A study of about 200 Chinese games found out that over 180,000 words have been subject to blacklisting. Extending outside of purely political wordage, innocuous terms such as "enemies" and "words" were also being censored.

=== Education and science ===
Censorship has been part of knowledge production and education since 1949 and organized and sustained within universities, academies, and schools. In authoritarian countries, censorship is not "from afar", but censorship gains power precisely when members of these organizations respect the political red lines and politically sensitive topics. Censorship and self-censorship are closely related in politically controlled organizations like universities and schools in China. Educational institutions within China have been accused of whitewashing PRC history by downplaying or avoiding mention of controversial historical events such as the Great Leap Forward, Cultural Revolution, and the Tiananmen Square protests of 1989.

In 2005, customs officials in China seized a shipment of textbooks intended for a Japanese school because maps in the books depicted mainland China and Taiwan using different colors, implying Taiwan was an independent state.

In a January 2006 issue of Freezing Point, a weekly supplement to the China Youth Daily, Zhongshan University professor Yuan Weishi published an article entitled "Modernization and History Textbooks" in which he criticized several middle school textbooks used in mainland China. In particular, he felt that depictions in the books of the Second Opium War avoided mention of Chinese diplomatic failures leading up to the war and that depictions of the Boxer Rebellion glossed over atrocities committed by the Boxer rebels. As a result of Yuan's article, Freezing Point was temporarily shut down and its editors were fired.

New Threads, a website for reporting academic misconduct in China such as plagiarism or fabrication of data, is banned in China.

A new standard world history textbook introduced in Shanghai high schools in 2006 supposedly omits several wars; it mentions Mao Zedong, founder of the PRC, only once.

In a FRONTLINE segment, four students from Peking University are seemingly unable to identify the context of the infamous Tank Man photo from the 1989 Tiananmen Square protests sparked by Peking University students, though possibly, the students were feigning ignorance so as not to upset the party official who was monitoring the interview with clipboard in hand. The segment implied that the subject is not addressed in Chinese schools.

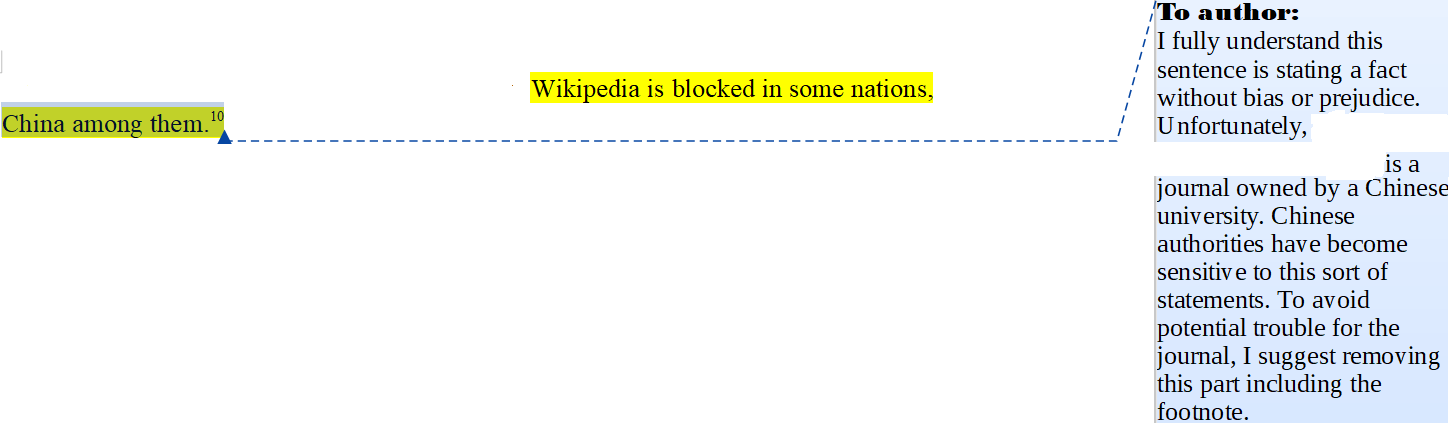
Self-censorship in a Chinese academic journal: an editor asks the article's author to remove a sentence about blocking of Wikipedia in mainland China as it could cause trouble with the "authorities."

On 4 June 2007, a person was able to place a small ad in a newspaper in southwest China to commemorate the anniversary of the Tiananmen Square protests reading "Paying tribute to the strong(-willed) mothers of 4 June victims". The accepting clerk claimed that she was ignorant of the event and believed that 4 June was the date of a mining disaster.

Censorship makes researching certain topics more difficult, risky, or outright illegal. A confidential internal directive widely circulated within the CCP, Concerning the Situation in the Ideological Sphere (關於當前意識形態領域情況的通報), prohibiting discussion of seven topics, was issued in May 2013. Included on the list of prohibited topics were constitutional democracy, universal values of human rights, conceptions of media independence and civil society, pro-market neo-liberalism, and "nihilist" criticisms of past errors of the party.

In the late 2010s, a number of incidents in which Chinese authorities requested that Western publishers of academic journals, such as Cambridge University Press, carry out censorship of their articles or risk them being not disseminated in China, became public. Themes that were common elements of this censorship included: Cultural Revolution, Falun Gong, Mao Zedong, Tibet, Tiananmen, and Taiwan.

During the COVID-19 pandemic in mainland China, investigations into the origins of the virus were censored.

== Historical trends ==
In 1955, the Chinese state issued State Council Instructions on How to Deal with Anti-revolutionary, Obscene, and Preposterous Books, Magazines, and Pictures, seeking to regulate the media market through both mass political mobilization and state administrative action. The Instructions resulted from multi-sided negotiations involving the state and new culture intellectuals.The document provided a range of approaches for various types of media, including banning, "clearing" (which referred to ceasing further publication), or preserving. Pursuant to the Instructions, books and journals that were "extremely anti-revolutionary," as well as pictures of sex acts, were banned. With regard to action stories, martial arts stories dealing with "outlandish" themes were to cease publication, but materials of "good knights-errant" should be preserved.

=== Cultural Revolution ===
The goal of the Cultural Revolution was to get rid of the Four Olds ("old customs", "old culture", "old habits", and "old ideas"). If newspapers touched on sensitive topics like these, the journalists were subject to arrest and sometimes violence. Libraries with books containing "offensive literature" would often be burned down. Television was regulated by the government and its goal was to encourage the efforts of Chairman Mao Zedong and the CCP. Radio was the same way, and played songs such as "The Great Cultural Revolution is Indeed, Good".

=== Xi Jinping era ===
CCP general secretary Xi Jinping has personally consolidated power and control within the state and party to a far greater extent than his predecessors Hu and Jiang. Accordingly, the intensity and range of censorship in China have increased under his rule. Xi has overseen the increased coordination and consolidation of censorship authorities, raising their efficiency, and under his leadership censorship practices have tightened.

According to James Palmer, writing for Foreign Policy in 2023, "[i]n the 2010s, China placed a lot of data online as it attempted to hold local governments more accountable, but it is now being pulled because the data has turned out to be inadvertently revelatory. The use of procurement notices and population data by Western analysts to identify the scale of the atrocities in Xinjiang helped spur the online cleanup."

During Xi Jinping's general secretaryship, China started enforcing an Internet real-name system for online platforms, requiring them to collect users' real names, ID numbers, and other information when providing services.

== Responses from society ==
=== Self-censorship ===
Various individuals and organizations both in and outside China sometimes voluntarily self-censor information that they share publicly by avoiding topics believed to be politically sensitive or controversial. They often self-censor to avoid unwanted attention or repercussions from the Chinese government. For example, in 2017, journalism professor Luwei Rose Luqiu conducted several anonymous interviews with well-known political satirists residing in China to demonstrate how censorship has increased since the creation of the State Internet Information Office in 2011. Interviewees described how, since 2011, they became increasingly cautious of the content they posted online and on social media in fear of repercussions from authorities. Most of the interviewees personally experienced being contacted by the National Security Police to "drink tea" (unofficial and casual conversation in plain clothes and in public), or be summoned, detained, and possibly disappeared. Luqiu argues that the changing policies of the Chinese government about what is considered unacceptable to share and discuss on the internet have made the practice of self-censorship more necessary for individuals such as political satirists who want to avoid such consequences as being banned from online platforms or being contacted by the police. These perspectives on self-censorship by the interviewees are part of internet censorship in China, which the Chinese government describes as regulations meant to prevent "subverting state power," "undermining national unity," and infringing upon national honor and interests.

==== Hong Kong ====
The introduction of the national security law in Hong Kong on 30 June 2020, which was implemented during a wave of protests that escalated in 2019, led many, especially activists, journalists, and others already subject to police scrutiny, to practice self-censorship. A Wall Street Journal article reported on a restaurant that had been warned by the police that it had violated the national-security law by displaying posters and messages supporting the protesters. As a result, the restaurant closed for in-person dining and only allowed staff inside to operate takeout services while some other restaurants and businesses preemptively removed supportive posters and notes to protect themselves. A Reuters article also reported that a book publisher hastily made revisions to remove words and passages that may have been problematic in light of the new law. The article also mentioned that other publishing houses and writers within the city halted sensitive projects while printers, distributors, and bookstores rejected controversial books.

Although independent of the mainland's legal system and hence censorship laws, some Hong Kong media have been accused of practicing self-censorship in order to exchange for permission to expand their media business into the mainland market and for greater journalistic access in the mainland too.

At the launch of a joint report published by the Hong Kong Journalists Association (HKJA) and "ARTICLE 19" in July 2001, the Chairman of the HKJA said: "More and more newspapers self-censor themselves because they are controlled by either a businessman with close ties to Beijing, or part of a large enterprise, which has financial interests over the border." For example, Robert Kuok, who has business interests across Asia, has been criticized over the departures of several China desk staff in rapid succession since he acquired the South China Morning Post, namely the editorial pages editor Danny Gittings, Beijing correspondent Jasper Becker, and China pages editor Willy Lam. Lam, in particular departed after his reporting had been publicly criticized by Robert Kuok.

After the implementation of the Hong Kong national security law in July 2020, media, publishers, and libraries began censoring content perceived as promoting Hong Kong independence, as well as works by prominent democratic activists. International media outlets like The New York Times also withdrew some staff from the city in anticipation of increased censorship in Hong Kong.

==== International businesses and education ====
International companies and organizations have also self-censored sensitive topics to maintain and avoid negatively affecting business and professional relationships within China. For example, in 2020, various American politicians accused the Hollywood film industry of self-censoring movies to appease the Chinese government and its audiences and gain access to its market. An article in the magazine The Hollywood Reporter commented on an extensive 94-page report by PEN America showing how major Hollywood studios and directors increasingly made decisions on elements like cast, plot, dialogue, and more to avoid antagonizing Chinese officials. The article criticizes these decisions as being made in the interest of profit-making, as "American movies earned $2.6 billion [USD] in China in 2019, with Disney's Avengers: Endgame pulling in $614 million [USD] there alone."

International corporations such as Google, Facebook, Microsoft, Apple, Myspace, Shutterstock, and Yahoo! have voluntarily censored content for Chinese markets in order to be allowed to do business in the country. In October 2008, Canadian research group Citizen Lab released a new report saying TOM's Chinese-language Skype software filtered sensitive words and then logged these, along with users' information, to insecure computer servers. In September 2007, activists in China had already warned about the possibility that TOM's versions have or will have more Trojan horse capability. Skype president Josh Silverman said it was "common knowledge" that Tom Online had "established procedures to meet local laws and regulations ... to monitor and block instant messages containing certain words deemed offensive by the Chinese authorities."

Ivy League schools such as Harvard University and Princeton University have also been accused of this behavior, as the national-security law in Hong Kong reportedly prompted the schools to use code words and warning labels for sensitive courses related to China to protect the schools and their students. The Wall Street Journal described these decisions as being sparked by schools like Harvard and Princeton getting funding from current and former students from China.

==== Xinjiang cotton controversy ====
In March 2021, apparel brands H&M, Nike, Adidas, and other large companies were criticized and boycotted in China by celebrities, social media platforms, and government media for expressing concern about the use of Uyghur forced labor in producing cotton. As a result, Chinese celebrities reportedly terminated contracts and cut ties with these companies, while Chinese e-commerce companies like Alibaba and JD.com removed products from sale on its platforms. A Xinjiang government spokesman, Xu Guixiang, directly criticized H&M over its statement on Xinjiang cotton for allegedly politicizing the company's economic behavior. In response to the backlash from Chinese consumers, media, and government officials, H&M published a statement on its website saying it was "working together with our colleagues in China to do everything we can to manage the current challenges and find a way forward." Journalists noted that H&M's messaging reverted to careful self-censorship following these events. An article by Elizabeth Paton in The New York Times commented on this statement, saying that it did not explicitly reference cotton, Xinjiang, or forced labour and that company executives during an earnings conference call similarly avoided such references and "did not comment on the impact of the controversy on sales, except to state that around 20 stores in China were currently closed." Xu Guixiang, the Xinjiang spokesman, along with other Chinese media outlets, celebrities, and businesses, has rejected the allegations from the companies and spoken in defense of their cotton industry in Xinjiang while simultaneously accusing Western companies of aiming to destabilize China through accusations of genocide.

=== Marketing ===
Publishers and other media in the Western world have sometimes used the "Banned in China" label to market cultural works, with the hope that censored products are seen as more valuable or attractive. Penguin Books also used the label to sell Mo Yan's novel The Garlic Ballads, which had been pulled from bookshelves because its themes (anti-government riots) were published so close to a period of actual riots. However, the book was allowed to be sold in China a few years later. Political scientist Richard Curt Kraus criticized Penguin for falsely portraying Mo Yan as a dissident in order to increase his marketability, as well as the underlying assumption that if the United States bans some work, that it must be genuinely obscene, but that if the Chinese government does the same, it is acting on purely political grounds.

On the Internet, people use proxy websites that allow anonymous access to otherwise restricted websites, services, and information. Falun Gong and others have been working in anti-censorship software development.

=== Circumventing censorship ===
==== Internet ====
Chinese citizens frequently use various techniques to circumvent Internet censorship in order to discuss social and political current events on online platforms and gain access to web pages blocked by the Great Firewall of China.

Public relay servers such as virtual private networks (VPNs) and The Onion Router nodes (Tor nodes) are widely used by Chinese netizens in order to visit blocked web pages. Typically, Internet Service Providers can view an internet user's traffic and data; however, virtual private networks connect internet users to a server through an encrypted connection. This prevents Internet Service Providers from being able to access the internet users' IP addresses, data, activity, and physical location. As a result, the internet user can access blocked websites through this external server. VPNs are so widely used by new agencies that many journalists, both within CCP-sanctioned media outlets and private media outlets, are instructed by their editors and supervisors to use VPNs in order to access international news.

Chinese netizens also use the method of "tunneling" to access blocked webpages. To avoid censorship by the Great Firewall of China, a web page can also be mirrored simply by recreating that page under a different URL. Both methods effectively bypass censorship because of the large scope of the Internet.

Netizens also have methods to express their opinions online without being censored by the government. The primary method is in the form of code words, metaphors, or plays on words. For example, the phrase "Grass Mud Horse" (Cao Ni Ma) is commonly used by netizens as a pun on a homophonous profanity; this phrase has been broadly used to signify a subversive means of broaching topics not permitted by the government, and it has been used by netizens advocating for greater freedom of speech. The rise of online satire and code words used to mock or criticize the government or sociopolitical issues has formed a subculture on the Chinese Internet called "egao" ("恶搞"), which translates literally into "evil doings" in Chinese. These code words and phrases allow netizens to discuss topics ranging from government corruption to health and environment scandals to everyday society and culture. Through this subculture, Chinese netizens can broach sensitive issues on social media with less risk of government censorship.

==== Print and other media ====
Writers and publishers have used empty blocks in texts as a graphical representation of censorship throughout Chinese history and in contemporary China.

Chinese citizens have devised methods to circumvent censorship of print media as well. As news organizations in China try to move away from the reputation of simply being mouthpieces for CCP propaganda, they face a difficult challenge of having to report the news objectively while remaining on good terms with the government. Journalists do their best to resist government censorship by maintaining a relatively neutral balance of positive and negative tones in articles, reporting on officials who have already been officially removed from their positions, disparaging the CCP as an entity instead of targeting individual officials, and placing blame on lower-ranking officials. News organizations encourage their journalists to report on more sensitive yet risky articles by promising journalists compensation even if their articles get cut by government officials before publication. Editors also try to ensure job security by continuing to employ a journalist under another position even when the CCP tells them to fire the journalist for disobeying CCP directives.

== See also ==
- Li Haoshi controversy
- 2013 Southern Weekly incident
- Human rights in China
- Mass media in China
- Chinese censorship abroad
- Propaganda in China
- Radio jamming in China
- Yumin zhengce
