= Cleaning the Web 2014 =

Chinese government campaign

The Cleaning the Web 2014 was a special campaign in China to crack down on the production and dissemination of pornography in the Internet. It was jointly implemented by the National Office for the Fight Against Pornography and Illegal Publications, the Office of the Central Cyberspace Affairs Commission, the Ministry of Industry and Information Technology, and the Ministry of Public Security.

This is the second government-led sweep of public network information since the 2013 Special Action to Crack Down on and Rectify Network Crimes. The official action lasted from 15 April 2014 to November 2014, and was divided into four main contents: "Clear Source 2014", "Clean Network 2014", "Autumn Wind 2014" and "Strengthen Border 2014". It was stated that the targets of the crackdown were "illegal publications", "obscene and pornographic cultural garbage", and "fake media, fake reporter stations, and fake reporters (three fakes)". As a result of this action, a number of pornographic websites were shut down, and many public network services and literary websites were also impacted.

== Background ==
In February 2014, the Chinese Communist Party (CCP) established the Central Leading Group for Cybersecurity and Informatization, regarding cybersecurity as an important issue for national development. This action also occurred shortly after the 2014 crackdown on prostitution in Dongguan.

== History ==
=== Announcement ===
The authorities formulated the following implementation methods for this operation:

- Comprehensive investigation of online pornography. Local authorities were required to conduct thorough investigations of websites, search engines, app stores, internet TV sticks, set-top boxes, and other similar platforms, and to immediately delete any text, images, videos, advertisements, or other information containing "obscene or pornographic content."
- Enterprises and individuals that produce and disseminate obscene and pornographic information should be severely punished in accordance with the law. Websites, channels, and columns found to have "serious problems in producing and disseminating obscene and pornographic information" would be required to be rectified, shut down, or have their relevant administrative licenses revoked; illegal websites would be "shut down or have their internet access revoked in accordance with the law"; those suspected of "producing, reproducing, publishing, selling, or disseminating obscene electronic information" would be held criminally liable in accordance with the Criminal Law of the People's Republic of China and the Judicial Interpretation of the Supreme People's Court and the Supreme People's Procuratorate on Several Issues Concerning the Specific Application of Law in Handling Criminal Cases of Disseminating Obscene Electronic Information via the Internet, etc.; telecommunications operators, network access service providers, advertising service providers, and billing service providers that facilitate the "dissemination of obscene and pornographic information" would be held criminally and administratively liable.
- Strictly implement the main responsibility of Internet enterprises Websites, telecommunications operators, and internet access service providers were required to "immediately conduct self-inspection and rectification," clean up online "obscene and pornographic" information or links, develop and apply technical measures to prevent the spread of "obscene and pornographic" information, and must not provide conditions or channels for the dissemination of "obscene and pornographic" information.
- Seriously investigate and hold accountable those who neglect their duties. Those responsible for dereliction of duty would be held accountable by relevant industry regulatory departments, administrative licensing approval or filing departments that were "lax in supervision". The legal representatives and supervisors of telecommunications operators and information service providers that "violate laws and regulations" would be held accountable.

In addition, contact information for reporting was published, and the public was encouraged to file complaints and reports.

=== Campaign ===
On April 13, the National Office for the Fight Against Pornography and Illegal Publications, the State Internet Information Office, the Ministry of Industry and Information Technology, and the Ministry of Public Security jointly issued the "Announcement on Launching a Special Campaign to Combat Online Pornographic Information," announcing the launch of the "Anti-Pornography and Anti-Illegal Publications · Clean Network 2014" special campaign to combat online pornographic information.

On April 14, the Ministry of Education held a symposium on the national education system's "Anti-Pornography and Anti-Illegal Publications · Clean Internet 2014" special campaign. Representatives from the Ministry of Education and some teachers and students from higher education institutions discussed the review of online information in universities. On the same day, Zhejiang Province shut down "Cuiweiju Novel Network" on the grounds of "publishing a large number of obscene and pornographic publications". The Guangzhou Public Security Bureau arrested more than 10 people, including Zhou Enhong, on the grounds that "Yanyu Hongchen Novel Network" produced and disseminated obscene and pornographic information, and seized 6 servers and 12 computers.

On April 15, Hunan Province announced its response and implementation of this action. On April 16, the Capital Internet Association issued a proposal in response to this action. On April 17, Guangdong Province began to respond to and implement this action, and the Guangdong Provincial People's Government announced the closure of 256 pornographic websites. On the same day, the Momo software was exposed by the news media for allegedly disseminating pornographic pictures and information related to sex trafficking, and faced the punishment of the government. On April 18, the Beijing Municipal People's Government shut down 241 accounts on pornographic video websites and cleaned up 40,584 related items. On the same day, Shenzhen Kuaibo Technology shut down its QVOD server and stopped video-on-demand and downloading based on Kuaibo technology. On April 20, Shanxi Province began to respond to and implement this action.

On April 21, the State Internet Information Office invited representatives from 15 official websites of the Chinese Communist Party and 6 portal websites, including Sina Corporation, Tencent, and Baidu, to Beijing to participate in the "Symposium of Heads of Central News Websites and Major Commercial Websites" to discuss the progress of the websites' "self-examination and self-correction" and the in-depth implementation of the "Anti-Pornography and Anti-Illegal Publications · Clean Internet 2014" special campaign, urging them to abide by laws and regulations, not to cross the red line, and to spread positive energy.

On April 22, Qinghai Province began to respond to and implement this action. On the same day, Shenzhen police raided the Shenzhen Kuaibo Technology Company in the Shenzhen Nanshan District Science and Technology Park and began questioning the company's employees. The police had sealed the company's computers, and Kuaibo Company said it would fully cooperate with the police's action. Guangming Daily published a report stating that China Telecom, China Mobile and China Unicom, the three telecommunications operators, all expressed their "firm support for carrying out the special action to combat pornography and illegal publications" and immediately began to clean up and rectify the problems reported by the National Office Against Pornography and Illegal Publications.

On April 23, Lu Wei, Secretary-General of the Internet Society of China, proposed at a members' symposium to respond to and participate in this action, and put forward the "establishment of a blacklist information sharing mechanism for 'obscene and pornographic' content". Representatives of Internet companies such as Sina, Xunlei, Qihoo 360, Baidu, and NetEase responded to this initiative, strictly investigated website content, opened "reporting portals for bad information", strengthened investigation and prevention efforts from all aspects such as backend operations and frontend pages, and cooperated with the government departments' review work. Representatives of the three telecommunications operators, China Telecom, China Mobile, and China Unicom, also claimed that they would "further strengthen the system, mechanism and technical means", resolutely block and cut off the source of "obscene and pornographic" information dissemination on the Internet, and immediately stop and remove any applications involving such information once they are discovered. They also investigated and cleaned up websites accessed by improving the website registration management. On the same day, the Hebei Provincial Internet Information Office also held a special action symposium at the Hebei Hall. Representatives from the Hebei Provincial Party Committee Propaganda Department, the Hebei Provincial Internet Information Office, the official website of Hebei Province, middle school students, parents and teachers participated in the discussion at the meeting.

On April 24, the National Anti-Pornography and Anti-Illegal Publications Office announced that Sina.com was suspected of disseminating 20 "obscene and pornographic internet works" and 4 "pornographic internet audio-visual programs" on its reading channel and video programs. It was decided to revoke Sina's Internet Publishing License and Information Network Transmission Audio-Visual Program License, legally stop its business of Internet publishing and online transmission of audio-visual programs, and impose a fine of 5 to 10 times the amount of the violation. Sina subsequently issued a statement saying that "we will earnestly implement the severe punishment given to us by the Internet authorities and will never shirk our responsibilities," and offered the public "the most sincere apology."

On April 26, mainland video portal websites removed four shows: The Big Bang Theory, The Good Wife, NCIS, and The Practice. Media reports quoted "industry insiders" as saying that the removal of these American dramas was related to the "Clean Internet" campaign. On April 28, Xunlei, a well-known download agent service provider, officially launched a self-censorship. Its Xunlei Cloud Player and offline download products have been basically paralyzed, which has aroused dissatisfaction and calls for refunds from Xunlei VIP paid users. On April 29, the Office of the Anti-Pornography and Anti-Illegal Publications Working Group and other departments announced that they had investigated and dealt with 110 pornographic websites and closed more than 3,300 illegal and irregular accounts in accordance with the laws and regulations.

On May 15, the National Office Against Pornography and Illegal Publications announced that Shenzhen Kuaibo Technology Co., Ltd. had engaged in the dissemination of obscene and pornographic content, and the circumstances were serious. In accordance with relevant regulations, the Guangdong Provincial Communications Administration intends to impose an administrative penalty on the company by revoking its value-added telecommunications business operating license, and has detained relevant personnel of the company. On May 28, the Ministry of Culture announced that 14 mobile game platforms, including 91 Assistant and Wandoujia, were investigated and punished for publishing online games containing pornographic content or for containing pornographic content in the promotion and publicity of online games. Ten of them completed administrative penalties, with a total fine of 113,000 yuan, and were ordered to remove the illegal games and carry out comprehensive rectification. On May 30, mobile instant messaging services such as WeChat, Yixin, Weimi, Laiwang, Momo, MiTalk, and Guangming.com Time Spectrum announced that they would launch self-censorship in response to the governance action and carry out cleanup and rectification.

On June 3, the State Administration of Press, Publication, Radio, Film and Television announced the investigation and punishment of 422 pornographic websites, the closure of 360 related channels and columns, the shutdown of more than 4,800 accounts on Weibo, blogs, WeChat, forums, and other platforms, the closure of more than 9,000 advertising links, and the deletion of more than 300,000 pieces of pornographic information. A spokesperson stated that most of the leads came from "netizen reports," and that more than 85% of the more than 3,000 reports received daily by the Illegal and Harmful Information Reporting Center were related to pornographic websites. The spokesperson also claimed that the administration would work with relevant departments to "deepen the special campaign," focusing on addressing prominent issues in three key areas and severely cracking down on illegal and irregular activities by four types of websites. The "three prominent problems" are the phenomenon of "pornographic marketing" and vulgar hype on large portal websites; the problem of "obscene and pornographic" information being "easily found" on search engine websites; the problem of spreading "obscene and pornographic information" through the mobile Internet; and the "four types of illegal and irregular behaviors", which refer to publishing advertisements and providing links for "obscene and pornographic" websites, using "obscene and pornographic" and "vulgar" pop-ups to attract attention on game websites, launching "vulgar videos and vulgar literature" on video websites or literature websites, and spreading "obscene, pornographic and vulgar information" in application stores and mobile clients.

On June 5, the State Administration of Press, Publication, Radio, Film and Television stated that relevant departments of the Administration were investigating 52 websites, including Baidu Tieba, NetEase Blog, Tudou.com, and Doc88, for allegedly publishing and disseminating illegal and irregular online publications such as the " Grimm's Fairy Tales " series, which involve organized crime, violence, and pornography. Once verified, they will be punished according to law and held civil and criminal liable. On June 6, the Shaanxi Provincial Anti-Pornography and Anti-Illegal Publications Office organized the Shangluo Municipal Public Security Bureau, the Press and Publication Bureau, the Cultural Market Law Enforcement Bureau and other departments to crack a case of fraud involving the sale of fake book numbers and arrested the main suspect, Yin Xuejun.

On June 20, the State Internet Information Office announced that it had dealt with and shut down 1,222 pornographic websites and conducted a special investigation on five influential forum websites, including Tianya, involving more than 150 sections and columns such as emotions, fashion, entertainment, videos, and pictures. In the review of the 422 pornographic websites that were shut down before the end of April, it was found that 132 had been restored. It also worked with relevant departments to guide relevant websites to shut down more than 20 million accounts involved in soliciting prostitution, including 33,000 illegal and irregular public accounts, and deleted more than 400,000 pieces of illegal and irregular information. More than 10 million pieces of fraudulent and false advertising information were filtered every day. On July 2, the National Office Against Pornography and Illegal Publications announced the results of the fifth batch of cases, including nine cases of disseminating "obscene materials" and "pornographic information" online. Jinjiang Literature Network was among them.

On July 22, the Ministry of Industry and Information Technology issued the "Notice on Deepening the Rectification of the Dissemination of Obscene and Pornographic Information by Mobile Smart Terminal Applications", proposing to review applications applicable to mobile devices and their manufacturers and publishers, strengthen the monitoring of "obscene and pornographic" information contained in applications, and establish an APP blacklist database. On July 29, The Beijing News reported that Phoenix.com, a news client of Beijing Tianying Jiuzhou Network Technology Co., Ltd., was strongly condemned by the News Review Committee of the Capital Internet Association for publishing news reports containing "pornographic and vulgar pictures". The committee demanded that Beijing Tianying Jiuzhou Network Technology Co., Ltd. issue a public apology to the whole society, immediately correct its mistakes, and accept punishment in accordance with the law.

On August 6, the Beijing Municipal Cultural Market Administrative Law Enforcement Team issued a rectification notice to Baidu on the grounds that the audio-visual programs disseminated by Baidu Cloud contained obscene and pornographic content, which violated the relevant provisions of the "Regulations on the Administration of Internet Audio-visual Program Services". The notice required Baidu Cloud to immediately delete the relevant content, close the accounts that disseminated "obscene and pornographic" information, rectify within a time limit, and submit a rectification report. On August 13, the Wuhan Municipal Bureau of Culture, Public Security and other departments jointly cracked down on a pirate CD production and sales den located in Kangcheng Community, Liudian, Huangpi District. They arrested the suspect Liu Shaowu, seized 103 large CD burners and more than 10 delivery logbooks, and confiscated more than 100,000 pirated CDs of 26 different types. On August 15, Wang Xin, the legal representative and general manager of Kuaibo Technology Co., Ltd., was arrested.

From August 16 to 19, the Shaanxi Provincial Public Security Department arrested Wang Mingze, Han Yanzhi, and Ying Haibing, suspects who were accused of impersonating journalists to extort money from a unit in Bin County. On August 19, the Xuzhou Economic and Technological Development Zone People's Court sentenced Zhong Wei to 14 years in prison and fined him 500,000 yuan for extortion in connection with a series of cases involving impersonating journalists to extortion; sentenced Dou Yugang to 13 years in prison and fined him 300,000 yuan; sentenced Yao Jun to 6 years in prison and fined him 150,000 yuan; and sentenced Ruan Conghai to 2 years and 6 months in prison and fined him 30,000 yuan. On August 26, the Shanghai First Intermediate People's Court sentenced five defendants, including Li, to prison terms ranging from three to ten years for organizing prostitution and assisting in organizing prostitution through an online platform, and imposed fines ranging from 20,000 to 50,000 yuan. On September 2, the Beijing Municipal Public Security Bureau and the Beijing Municipal Cultural Market Administrative Law Enforcement Team jointly cracked down on a major criminal gang that manufactured and sold pirated textbooks and teaching aids. The public security organs arrested 87 people involved in the case in Beijing and Jiangxi, of whom 32 were criminally detained. They seized more than 1.2 million copies of suspected illegal publications with a total value of more than 50 million yuan, as well as a large number of printing equipment, account books, etc.

On September 17, the National Office Against Pornography and Illegal Publications and the Ministry of Public Security jointly announced 14 cases, all of which involved the dissemination of "obscene and pornographic information" and "organization of prostitution" through online services such as Weibo, WeChat, micro-videos, and micro-films. The Beijing Municipal Public Security Bureau cracked down on 4 related gangs, investigated and dealt with 6 prostitution dens, and arrested 25 criminals. The Guangdong Provincial Public Security Bureau cracked 5 related cases and arrested 37 criminals. In addition, the National Office Against Pornography and Illegal Publications also announced that Sohu, Tencent, and Xunlei were punished for the dissemination of "obscene and pornographic" information through their Weibo, WeChat and other products. Sohu was fined 50,000 yuan by the Beijing Municipal Cultural Market Administrative Law Enforcement Team for having "Artificial Girl 3 Strategy Guide" on its blog, which contained content prohibited by laws and regulations; Tencent was fined 50,000 yuan by the Shenzhen Nanshan District Press and Publication Bureau for disseminating "obscene and pornographic information" in its social tools such as WeChat and Weibo; and Xunlei's "offline server" contained "obscene and pornographic" video information and was fined 50,000 yuan by the Shenzhen Nanshan District Press and Publication Bureau. Since August, Beijing police have cracked down on four gangs that organized prostitution activities using social tools such as Weibo and WeChat, investigated and dealt with six prostitution dens, and arrested 25 criminals.

On September 23, the China Internet Illegal and Harmful Information Reporting Center issued a message stating that websites such as Xunlei, Sohu, Tencent, and Kuping were spreading illegal content through pop-up ads, and requested administrative law enforcement departments to strengthen management. On September 24, Shenzhen Kuaibo Technology Co., Ltd. was transferred to the procuratorate for review and prosecution by the Haidian Branch of the Beijing Municipal Public Security Bureau on charges of "suspected dissemination of obscene materials for profit". On the same day, the State Internet Information Office, the Ministry of Industry and Information Technology, and the State Administration for Industry and Commerce held a special symposium on "rectifying online pop-ups" and decided to launch a special campaign to "rectify online pop-ups" in the near future to strengthen the crackdown on illegal activities such as disseminating obscene and pornographic information, Trojan viruses, and fraudulent information through online pop-ups.

On September 30, the China Internet Illegal and Harmful Information Reporting Center announced that it received 40,217 valid reports from the public in September. Among these, 28,159 were reports of obscene and pornographic information, 9,350 were reports of fraudulent information, 509 were reports of online rumors, 115 were reports of violent and terrorist audio and video content, and 2,084 were reports of other illegal and harmful information violating the " Seven Bottom Lines," including infringements on netizens' rights. The center notified websites such as Baidu, Tencent, Sina, and Taobao to remove 5,581 pornographic links. It also notified websites to take action against 300 instant messaging accounts spreading obscene and pornographic information online, including 275 Tencent QQ groups organizing online pornographic performances and 25 QQ and WeChat accounts engaged in online prostitution and spreading obscene and pornographic information. The reporting center also notified websites to take action against 58 WeChat public accounts, 830 blog accounts, and 150 Weibo accounts spreading "online rumors." Facebook, YouTube and other websites have been criticized by the Chinese Communist Party authorities for their "delayed response" and "low deletion rate" to "violent and terrorist" videos. Renren.com, Tiexue Community, Ziling Forum and other websites deleted 78 pieces of "violent and terrorist harmful information" online. Military websites such as Qiangjun.com, Zhongyuan Military Network, Yidian Military Network, Junshen Online, and Peninsula Military Network published and compiled news without registration or news publishing qualifications, disseminated "bloody and violent pictures" and "vulgar and harmful information", and used pop-up windows to spread false medical advertisements. The reporting center has transferred the reported clues to the relevant government departments for handling.

On November 24, the People's Court of Moyu County, Hotan City, Xinjiang, sentenced Tohtiniyaz Tursuniyaz to six years in prison and fined him RMB 20,000 for "illegally manufacturing and selling religious publications across provinces and regions"; and sentenced Maimaiti Abudula Ubuli to five years in prison and fined him RMB 10,000. On December 25, the National Office Against Pornography and Illegal Publications announced the "Top Ten Data" during the "Clean Network 2014" special campaign. These included the seizure of 15.79 million illegal publications; the receipt of 82,402 reports of online pornography and obscenity; the handling of 96 cases of anti-pornography and anti-illegal publications cases by the Office Against Pornography and Illegal Publications, either alone or in conjunction with other departments; the investigation and handling of 8,344 cases of anti-pornography and anti-illegal publications, including 844 cases of pornography and obscenity, 2,687 cases of pirated publications, 584 cases of online anti-pornography and anti-illegal publications, 128 cases of "fake media, fake reporter stations, and fake reporters," and 4,101 other illegal publications; and the centralized destruction of 20.41 million pirated and illegal publications on World Intellectual Property Day, April 24.

== Reactions ==
Following the launch of this operation, the authorities claimed that it received strong support and praise from both the Chinese Communist Party and the public. The official media also cited examples of foreign countries dealing with pornography to prove the legitimacy of the operation. They also issued the slogan "Carry out the 'cleaning up of the internet' to the end" to show their determination to crack down on it.

Social networking sites gradually announced their cooperation with the government's special campaign. For example, after being condemned and exposed, Baidu Tieba announced the launch of a "Special Campaign to Combat Sensitive and False Information" to show its cooperation. It also opened a special column to publicize the total number of deleted information and the accounts that have been banned. It also asked netizens to cooperate in reporting and deleting posts containing "sensitive and false information". Some well-known Tieba forums and participants of the "Tieba Initiative Alliance" posted statements to cooperate. At the end of April 2014, Baidu Cloud also announced that it would stop its offline download service in response to the cleanup campaign, which further aroused netizens' concerns. Xunlei Cloud Play service was also affected, which aroused dissatisfaction and calls for refunds from Xunlei VIP paid users.

Some people believe that this "anti-pornography" campaign may become a tool for the Chinese authorities to tighten online speech in disguise. Chinese online writer "Tiancan Tudou" believes that this "censorship activity may also affect online writers who write normally. The main reason is that there is no clear standard for censorship at present. Too vague guidance can easily make the censorship scale too loose or too tight." The Citizen Lab website of the University of Toronto commented that the government chose online pornography as the target because the target is obvious and legitimate. "Chinese people usually do not say no to anti-pornography campaigns." In this way, by choosing less controversial topics, the government can establish the authority and "rules" of the Internet platform online and warn "those who do not follow the rules": the government is paying attention to everything online.

== Aftermath ==
On November 6, 2014, the State Internet Information Office and the State Administration of Press, Publication, Radio, Film and Television held a press conference to announce that a special campaign to clean up and rectify harmful information in online videos would be launched immediately. The campaign would target areas such as online hard drives; smartphone application download services; related video links shared in interactive links such as Weibo, blogs, forums, and WeChat; websites without audio-visual service qualifications or even without registration; and Internet television. The campaign would focus on cleaning up obscene, pornographic, violent, terrorist, false, and rumor-related video information and would continue until the end of December.

On January 9, 2015, Zhou Huilin, full-time deputy director of the National Office Against Pornography and Illegal Publications, said that the special campaigns of "Clean Source 2015", "Border Consolidation 2015", "Net Cleaning 2015" and "Autumn Wind 2015" would continue, and the special campaign of "Protecting Seedlings 2015" would be launched to target "illegal activities of producing and selling harmful and illegal children's publications and information".
