= National Office Against Pornography and Illegal Publications =

Chinese Communist Party body

- 全国“扫黄打非”工作小组办公室
- Formation: 1989; 37 years ago
- Type: Office
- Location: Beijing
- Director: Xue Songyan
- Parent organization: Publicity Department of the Chinese Communist Party
- Website: www.shdf.gov.cn

National Office Against Pornography and Illegal Publications
- Simplified Chinese: 全国“扫黄打非”工作小组办公室
- Traditional Chinese: 全國「掃黃打非」工作小組辦公室
Transcriptions
Standard Mandarin
- Hanyu Pinyin: Quánguó "sǎohuáng dǎfēi" gōngzuò xiǎozǔ bàngōngshì

Abbreviated as
- Simplified Chinese: 全国扫黄打非办
- Traditional Chinese: 全國掃黃打非辦
Transcriptions
Standard Mandarin
- Hanyu Pinyin: Quánguó sǎohuáng dǎfēi bàn

The National Office Against Pornography and Illegal Publications is an internal organization of the Publicity Department of the Chinese Communist Party, responsible for eliminating pornographic publications and combating illegal publishing activities. It is the office of the National Fight Against Pornography and Illegal Publications Working Group.

== History ==
Since its establishment, the Office has strengthened its supervision of the publication market during the Two Sessions and two festivals, and has periodically commended groups that supported its activities. It has also strengthened supervision before, during and after international events held in China, such as the 2008 Beijing Olympics and the Shanghai World Expo. The National Office has stated that its official responsibilities are to establish a responsible attitude towards the Party and the country and to focus on solving problems that have provoked public concern. The Office's tasks include ideological struggle, and its work content includes measures to combat "illegal publications, eliminating illegal pornographic material, and combating "fake media, fake news agencies, and fake journalists" the "three fakes".

In 2009, the "Moat Project" (including Beijing and neighboring provinces) was launched to crack down on illegal publications; in September 2009, the "Mount Everest Project" (including five northwestern provinces) was launched to crack down on Xinjiang independence materials and publications; in November 2009, the "Tianshan Project" (including five southwestern provinces) was launched to crack down on Tibetan independence materials and publications; in May 2010, the "Nanling Project" (including southern provinces, Beijing and Shanghai) was launched to crack down on illegal publications and the influx of foreign publications; the "Changbai Mountain Project" (including northeastern provinces) was launched to crack down on illegal publications.

In April 2014, the Office participated in launching four special campaigns, namely "Clear Source 2014", "Cleaning the Web 2014", "Autumn Wind 2014" and "Solid Border 2014", as well as the 2014 Special Campaign to Clean Up and Rectify Harmful Information in Online Videos. In 2015, the Office participated in launching three special campaigns, namely "Clean Net 2015", "Protect Young People 2015" and "Autumn Wind 2015". In 2016, the Office participated in launching three special campaigns, namely "Clean Net 2016", "Protect Young People 2016" and "Autumn Wind 2016". In April 2017, the Office participated in launching three special campaigns, namely "Clean Net 2017", "Protect Young People 2017" and "Autumn Wind 2017". In April 2018, the Office participated in launching three special operations: "Net Cleaning 2018", "Protecting Young People 2018" and "Autumn Wind 2018". In November 2018, Shanghai, Jiangsu, Zhejiang and Anhui in the Yangtze River Delta region formed the "Anti-Pornography and Anti-Illegal Publications Integrated Project". In March 2019, the Office participated in launching three special operations: "Net Cleaning 2019", "Protecting Young People 2019" and "Autumn Wind 2019".

== Organization ==
The National Office Against Pornography and Illegal Publications is affiliated to the Central Leading Group for Propaganda, Ideology and Culture. It is composed of 26 departments, including the Propaganda Department, the United Front Work Department, and the Political and Legal Affairs Commission. Its members are deputy ministerial-level leaders in charge of relevant departments. The office is located in the Publicity Department, and it is also known as the Office Against Pornography and Illegal Publications of the Publicity Department. The heads of the National Fight Against Pornography and Illegal Publications Working Group include the head of the Publicity Department.

National Office Against Pornography and Illegal Publications has the following offices:

- General Office
- Coordination and Supervision Department
- Case Supervision Office (Joint Reporting Center)
- Information Office

== See also ==
- Pornography in China
