= Margaret E. Roberts =

American political scientist

- Citizenship: American
- Education: Stanford University (BA, MS), Harvard University (PhD)
- Occupation(s): Political scientist, China specialist
- Employer: University of California, San Diego
- Website: https://margaretroberts.net

Margaret E. Roberts is an American political scientist. She is a professor of political science and holds Chancellor's Associates Chair I at the University of California, San Diego. Her research focuses on censorship in China.

== Education ==
Roberts holds a BA in international relations and economics and an MA in statistics from Stanford University. She earned a PhD in government from Harvard University.

== Publications ==
=== Books ===
- Censored: Distraction and Diversion Inside China's Great Firewall, Princeton University Press, 2018

=== Articles ===
- The Authoritarian Data Problem, Journal of Democracy, October 2023 (co-authored with Eddie Yang)
