= Lüqiu Luwei =

Chinese television journalist

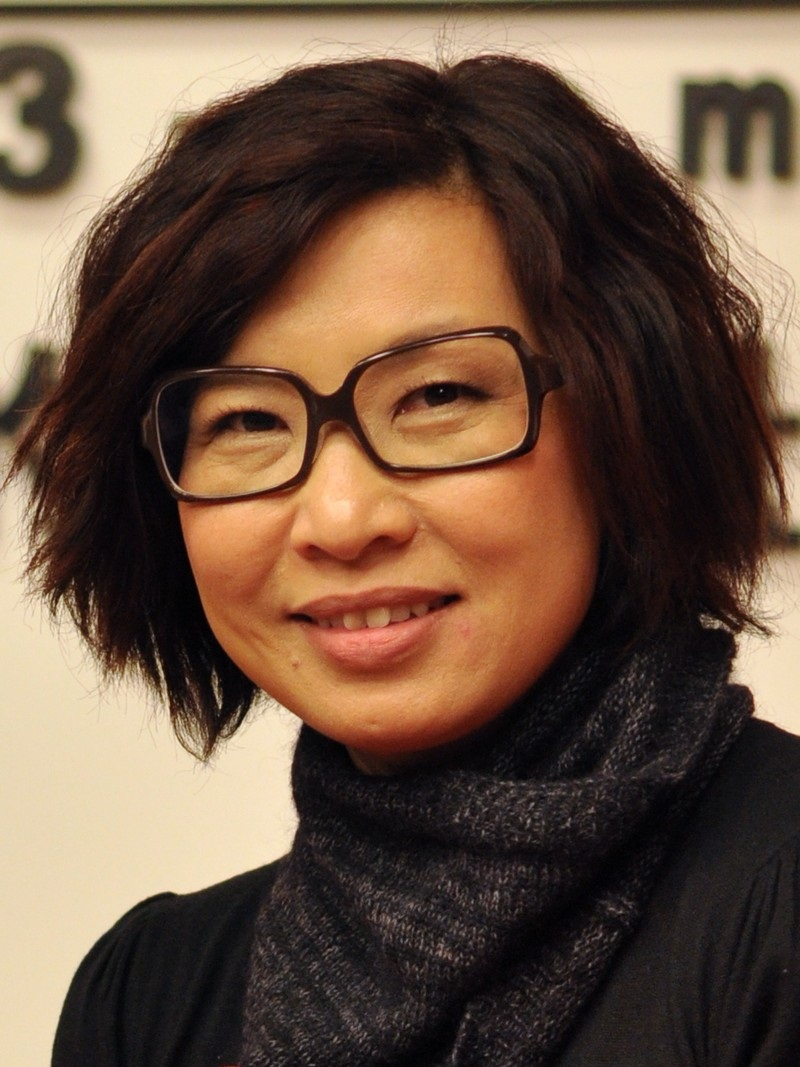
- Born: 19 September 1969 (age 56); Shanghai, China
- Education: Fudan University; University of Hong Kong; Hong Kong Baptist University; Harvard University; Pennsylvania State University
- Occupations: Journalist, news editor
- Spouse(s): Ex-husband (1993-2002, 1 child); Luo (2006-)
- Children: 1

Lüqiu Luwei (Chinese: 闾丘露薇; pinyin: Lǘqiū Lùwēi, born 19 September 1969), also known as Rose Luqiu, is a Chinese television journalist and the executive news editor for Phoenix Television. She was the first female reporter to cover the 2001 Afghan war.

== Career ==
Lüqiu was born into an ordinary worker's family in Shanghai on September 19, 1969. Her father Lüqiu Zhiyi (闾丘志毅) is a veteran. Her parents divorced when she was four years old. Her mother went to Shenzhen and she lived with her paternal grandparents. Lüqiu entered into No. 2 High School of East China Normal University in 1982, where she worked on the Shanghai Middle school students press corps and later became the head. In 1988, Lüqiu was admitted to Fudan University. On graduation from university, she taught herself accounting and was hired by an accounting company PricewaterhouseCoopers. In 1995, she moved to Hong Kong with her husband and became an interpreter at a television station named Chinese Television Network.

In 1997, she joined Phoenix Television and became one of its first reporters. At Phoenix satellite TV, she interviewed statesmen, such as President Hu Jintao, Premier Wen Jiabao and many foreign leaders in different countries and broadcast on events both at home and abroad. She has been to Europe, America and Asia and interviewed of President Jiang Zemin, Premier Zhu Rongji and George W. Bush, the former US President.

In 2001, she was the first woman-journalist who headed to Kabul, Afghanistan to broadcast on the events there following the September 11 attacks in the United States. In February 2002 and end of the year, she had been to Afghanistan for two times. She became the only Chinese woman journalist who had been to Afghanistan for three times. In 2003, the Iraq War of 2003 broke out. She was the only woman journalist broadcasting live from the center of Baghdad where the US army bombed.

In 2007 Lüqiu was awarded a Nieman Fellowship by the Nieman Foundation for Journalism, at Harvard University in the United States. She has written several books, such as Rose in the Journey and Not Telling East and West. In these books, she expresses her attitude towards life and abundant experiences.
