= Pornography in China =

Despite contemporary censorship in the People's Republic of China today, pornography in China has an extensive history. It is difficult to say how extensive, as scholars continue to dispute the purpose of existing erotic art pieces. Sexual education materials date back to the 1st century CE, while the first recorded erotic novels appeared in the late Ming dynasty. The innovation of the printing press led to the popularity of erotic art and both the Ming and Qing dynasties saw sporadic attempts to suppress such material. The Republic of China of the early 20th century saw heightened attempts to police pornography, which continues under the People's Republic of China (PRC).

Pornography is currently illegal in China. It remains one of the most heavily censored topics by the Chinese Communist Party. However, pornography is still accessible via the Internet, resulting in an increase in pornography use during the 2000s. Nationwide surveys between the years 2000 and 2015 revealed "more than 70 percent of men aged 18 to 29 said they had watched porn in the past year". A study conducted in 2012 found that of a sample of university students, a 57% majority had consumed pornography.

PRC authorities have closed down many pornographic services in recent years, but an ongoing cat and mouse game between the two has led providers and users to find other ways to share adult content, both self-made and pirated from other pornographic film studios. In this aspect the development of the nation's online porn industry reflects the overall development of China's Internet.

== History ==
Although there are references to older works, there exists little to no definitive pieces of erotic art prior to the Ming period — what might by modern standards be considered "pornography." The late Ming saw a period of sexual openness which produced erotic novels and woodblock prints. Sexually explicit novels of the Ming period include Ruyijun zhuan ("The Lord of Perfect Satisfaction") and Xiuta yeshi ("The Embroidered Couch"). During the Qing, these novels would become stigmatized and access to them was limited.

After the introduction of the lithograph in the 19th century, print production was simplified and markets became saturated with both foreign and domestic nude photographs. The selling of sexually explicit books and art was eventually banned by the Qing government, a ban which continued after the 1911 Revolution. Numerous vendors were arrested in Beijing during the late imperial and Republican periods due to the selling or possession of erotic material.

== Legality ==
=== Statutes ===
==== Criminal code ====
The Criminal Law of the People's Republic of China prescribes the production and distribution of pornography as punishable offences. It does not prescribe possession to be illegal. It defines pornography as

sex-propagating books or periodicals, films, video- or audio-tapes, pictures or other pornographic articles which concretely describe sexual acts or undisguisedly publicize sex

— translation by Asian Legal Information Institute

As punishment, the law provides for fines, public surveillance of the individual, or imprisonment not exceeding two years. In cases where the act is deemed to be for-profit, the maximum imprisonment period is to be three years.

==== Public Security Administration Punishments Law ====
According to Article 68 of the Public Security Administration Punishments Law, it is illegal to produce, transport, duplicate, sell or lend pornographic materials including books, periodicals, pictures, movies and audio-video products, or disseminate pornographic information by making use of computer information networks, telephones or other means of communications, violators shall be detained for no less than 10 days but no more than 15 days and may, in addition, be fined no more than 3,000 yuan; and if the circumstances are relatively minor, they shall be detained for no more than 5 days or be fined no more than 500 yuan; simple possession is legal.

== Enforcement ==
In practice, enforcement is limited to punishing violators who spread pornographic materials amounting to more than 40 files on China's social media platforms, and punishment is rare for leeching and seeding pornographic materials via peer-to-peer (P2P) networks. Many get pornographic materials this way. Giant companies like Baidu, Tencent which provides Cloud storages and P2P offline download services (Seedbox), will often change pornographic videos to "8 seconds educational videos" to educate users that the government is conducting a campaign to combat pornography and illegal activities, or to simply prevent users from downloading or uploading pornographic materials.

=== Related arrests and censorship ===
==== 2004-2006 ====
A crackdown of pornographic websites in 2004 lead to the arrests of over 200 people and the shutdown of over 700 pornographic websites including "99 Erotica", after having acquired more than 300,000 registered users within a year of its launch. One of those imprisoned, Wang Yanli, was believed to be the first woman jailed on a pornography related charge. She received a sentence of four years for operating an online strip club.

In 2005 authorities sentenced its eleven workers, among them teachers and civil servants, to imprisonment ranging from three to twelve years for disseminating obscene material. In October 2006 authorities closed down "Erotica Juneday", which charged its highest-paying members 3,999 yuan (then around $490) a year, and sentenced founder Chen Hui to life imprisonment. Among those who complained about the harshness of the sentence was the sociologist Li Yinhe. She called on authorities to either repeal the pornography laws in China or stop pretending the nation enjoys freedom of expression.

==== 2009-present ====
Between 2009 and 2010, crackdowns on pornography sites resulted in the arrests of thousands of people annually. In 2009, 5,394 people were arrested and 9,000 illegal porn-related sites were shut down. In 2010, Chinese authorities shut down 60,000 pornographic websites and arrested almost 5,000 suspects. In 2014, the Chinese government launched the Cleaning the Web campaign.

Renewed nationwide campaigns since 2020 report large-scale takedowns (e.g., 60,000+ apps and websites removed or penalized; 19 million items of "harmful" content cleared in 2021–22), alongside targeted actions on livestreaming. In 2025, multiple outlets reported arrests linked to online erotica communities (including danmei/Boys’ Love authors), amid continuing Operation Qinglang clean-up campaigns. Renewed Operation Qinglang campaigns post-2020 escalated takedowns, with 2025 arrests in danmei communities highlighting focus on niche online erotica.

== Government censorship ==
The Chinese government consistently holds the idea that pornography information is harmful, arguing that "disseminating pornographic information online severely harms the physical and mental health of minors, and seriously corrupts social ethos", pornography information is close to "spiritual pollution". Xinhuanet states that "Chinese cultural traditions and moral values do not allow obscene and pornographic information to spread unchecked on the Internet".

In 1997, a sweeping wave of regulations aimed at restricting internet usage was enacted. Section Five of the Computer Information Network and Internet Security, Protection, and Management Regulations was the first time pornography was specifically targeted and banned in China's criminal law. It defined obscene material as any "books, periodicals, movies, video-and audio-tapes, pictures, etc. that explicitly portray sexual behavior or undisguisedly publicize pornographic materials", but made exception for those used for medical or artistic purposes.

The State Administration of Radio, Film and Television's prohibition on pornography has been complete, and the government has shown no signs of reversing its decision. Directors, producers, and actors involved in pornographic films have been barred from competing in any film competitions. Any film studio found in violation may have its license revoked.

=== Methods ===
The term Great Firewall of China was coined in 1997 by Geremie Barmé to describe the combination of legislative actions and technologies enforced by the People's Republic of China to regulate the Internet domestically. First introduced in 1997, three years after the internet first arrived in China, it included regulations prohibiting the use of the internet to disseminate sexually suggestive material, among other things. The Great Firewall is a subsystem of the Golden Shield Project, also referred to as the "National Public Security Work Informational Project".

In its effort to combat internet pornography and other internet activity which it deemed illegal, the government of China issued the widespread use of internet censors. Algorithms designed by tech companies including Alibaba and Tuputech, these censors were designed to detect, block, and remove all sexual content. The development of artificial intelligence technologies has been essential in the success of the censorship of internet pornography in China.

=== Issues ===
Chinese internet censors are highly skilled at detecting pornographic images, audios, and videos. However, these censors are imperfect and susceptible to errors. An online lecture on human birth was shut down after censors flagged the livestream as pornographic material. “A livestreamed course on meiosis, the division of sex cells...” resulted in a similar problem for a biology teacher in Wenzhou, China. While trying to eliminate all sexual content, censors have inadvertently targeted educational content though the law allows it.

Pornography related charges often carry serious punishments. Distributors of pornography can face up to life imprisonment and possession charges carry hefty fines and can carry prison sentences. Some critics claim that censorship disproportionately targets LGBT content, which leads to higher criminalization of authors and creators who attempt to make pornography more inclusive. Others claim that the crackdown on pornography is used as a tool by the Communist Party to increase censorship and further limit freedom of expression.

Sex education is extremely limited in China. Consequently, pornography has become the "only source of information for millions of young people" looking to learn about sex.

== Dissemination ==
=== Pornographic websites ===
The first pornographic websites appeared in China before sites like YouPorn and Pornhub became popular in the West. A few major (though ill-fated) websites appeared in China during 2004, including "99 Erotica Forum" and "Erotica Juneday". The business model for these websites requires visitors to navigate through pay-per-click advertisements for sex toys, Viagra-esque pills, and online casinos before they can watch or download pornographic content. The websites typically offer a mix of domestic amateur pornography videos and pirated content from Japan, Europe and the US. They typically set up their servers overseas and frequently change their URLs to avoid being detected by the authorities. The quantity of advertisements on these websites, sometimes with no pornographic content available after the advertisements have been navigated, and the high risk of picking up malware in the process of attempting to access these websites has prompted some services in China to charge a membership fee in return for greater reliability and fewer or no advertisements. However, the use of domestic bank accounts makes such websites even more vulnerable to authorities. The continued creation and distribution of pornography, despite its illegality, has resulted in the imprisonment of thousands of people across China.

=== Live-streaming ===
Sexual live streaming gained prominence in 2016, prompting the government to announce a no-tolerance policy towards streaming platforms which host explicit content. Platforms such as Blued, which had previously hosted sexual content, introduced strict bans. After the ban, many users switched to social media sites like Twitter for covert consumption of non-live pornographic videos.

== Culture ==
In many Eastern countries, particularly in China in recent years, discussions surrounding sexual matters have often been viewed as embarrassing or taboo. Adolescents, who are going through the challenging period of puberty, face a significant challenge when it comes to obtaining accurate and reliable information about sex, both from their parents and their schools. During puberty, adolescents experience a heightened need for sexual knowledge and a deeper understanding of their own physical and psychological changes. However, the prevailing cultural norms often hinder open conversations on these topics. To complicate matters, the rapid growth of the Internet has made explicit content, such as pornography, widely accessible to people of all ages. The availability, affordability, and anonymity of online pornography have made it a readily accessible source for curious individuals. This has given rise to numerous consequences and impacts on its users, including psychological and social effects that are of growing concern.

In Hong Kong and Macau, the Adult FriendFinder (AFF.com) website operates within a sophisticated and Western-influenced metropolis, marked by high-tech infrastructure and underlying moral conservatism. Despite efforts by progressive communities and sex activists to foster a sex-positive cultural climate, tensions persist between Chinese and Western mindsets. The site's membership in Hong Kong exhibits a significant gender imbalance, with around 100,000 male members compared to 8,000 females in December 2007. Women experience a flood of requests, while men often struggle to receive replies. Although the site is available in both Chinese and English, users from various backgrounds tend to correspond in English.

On the mainland China front, the government's stringent policies against pornography and Internet censorship shape the online landscape. The uneven gender ratio on AFF.com in Hong Kong creates opportunities for non-Chinese men, particularly Caucasians, to connect with Chinese women. Chinese women in Hong Kong leverage the platform to explore cross-racial dating, challenging traditional gender expectations within Chinese culture. Female profiles, predominantly from Asian women, often adopt names associated with 'whore-like' or 'bad girl' femininity, with explicit photos focusing on specific body parts. Male profiles frequently feature explicit images, reinforcing a narrative of forceful male seduction. This complex interplay of cultural dynamics underscores the unique and evolving nature of online interactions in the region.

=== Impact on adolescents ===
In 2013, a study was conducted among college students in Chongqing, China, revealing that the use of pornography was quite prevalent in this demographic. 94.2% of college students reported having been exposed to pornography prior to entering college. The study highlighted a correlation between pornography consumption and masturbation habits, suggesting that prolonged exposure to pornography could potentially lead to addiction.

The findings of the study indicated a significant connection between the use of pornography and the frequency of masturbation among the college students. Moreover, it was observed that a higher frequency of masturbation in conjunction with pornography had detrimental effects on sperm concentration and the total sperm count, raising important health-related concerns.

=== Slang ===
Pornography collectors who have resources are called "old drivers" (Chinese: 老司机; pinyin: Lǎo sījī), while sharing pornographic videos is referred to as "driving" (Chinese: 开车; pinyin: Kāichē), the recipient of the content is known as a "car seat" (Chinese: 坐车; pinyin: Zuòchē) and pornography is "welfare" (Chinese: 福利; pinyin: Fúlì).

== See also ==
- Pornography laws by region
- Internet censorship in China
- Legality of child pornography
- Legal status of internet pornography
