= Zhang Junti =

Chinese translator

- 张君悌
- Born: Zhang Shaoyan (张少岩); April 25, 1910; Nangong County, Hebei, China
- Died: August 13, 1971 (aged 61); Shangluo, Shaanxi, China
- Education: Harbin Special Administrative Law School
- Occupation: Translator
- Writing career
- Pen name: Jin Ren (金人); Tian Feng (田丰)
- Language: Chinese, Russian
- Genre: Novel
- Notable work: And Quiet Flows the Don

Zhang Junti (simplified Chinese: 张君悌; traditional Chinese: 張君悌; pinyin: Zhāng Jūntì; 25 April 1910 – 13 August 1971), also known by his pen name Jin Ren and Tian Feng, was a Chinese translator. Zhang was the first person from China to translate Russian novelist Mikhail Alexandrovich Sholokhov's And Quiet Flows the Don into Chinese.

== Biography ==
Zhang was born Zhang Shaoyan (张少岩) in Nangong County, Hebei, on April 25, 1910. He lost his mother when he was young and wandered with his father in Jiangsu, Anhui, Henan and Beijing. He studied at the Primary School Affiliated to Beijing Normal University and the Beijing Anhui High School.

In 1927 he came to Harbin, capital of northeast China's Heilongjiang province, where he worked as an employee in a law court. In 1930 he enrolled at Harbin Special Administrative Law School, where he majored in law.

He started to publish works during that time. In 1933, under the influence of young writers such as Luo Feng (罗烽), Jin Jianxiao, Jiang Chunfang, Shu Qun (舒群), Xiao Hong and Xiao Jun, he began to translate Russian classical and modern literature. In 1935 he was supervised by the Japanese police, due to his translation of progressive books.

In 1937, he left for Shanghai, where he taught at Shanghai Zhonghua Girls' High School and Peicheng Girls' High School. During the Second Sino-Japanese War, he translated Mikhail Alexandrovich Sholokhov's And Quiet Flows the Don. In 1942 he became director of the Department of Justice in Jiangsu. He returned to Shanghai in the following year.

After Japan surrendered, he came to northeast China and served as Secretary of the CPC Shenyang Underground Municipal Committee. When Liu Baiyu visited him in 1946, they were secretly followed by the Kuomintang. After Liu Baiyu left, he was arrested by the Kuomintang. In 1947, he was released in exchange for Zhao Junmai (赵君迈), the mayor of Changchun, who was captured by the People's Liberation Army. Then he served as vice-minister and publishing minister of Research Department of Northeast Cultural Association. In 1948 he became director of the Ministry of Justice of the Northeast Administrative Committee, and held that office until November 1949, when he was appointed deputy director of Compilation Bureau of the General Administration of Press and Publication.

After the founding of the Communist State, he successively worked in the Times Publishing House and People's Literature Publishing House. In 1952 he joined the China Writers Association. During the Cultural Revolution, he suffered political persecution and was sent to the May Seventh Cadre Schools to do farm work in Shangluo, Shaanxi. He died there on August 13, 1971.

== Translations ==
- And Quiet Flows the Don (静静的顿河)
