= The Golden Era (film) =

2014 Chinese-Hong Kong film by Ann Hui

- Theatrical release poster
- Chinese: 黄金时代
- Directed by: Ann Hui
- Written by: Li Qiang
- Produced by: Qin Hong; Chen Xiaoqing; Han Sanping; Hao Shen; William Kong; Victor Koo; La Peikang; Tsui Tit Kwan; Xu Tiejun; Li Qiang (executive producer)
- Starring: Tang Wei; Feng Shaofeng
- Cinematography: Wang Yu
- Edited by: Wai Manda
- Music by: Eli Marshall
- Production companies: Edko Films; China Film Group Corporation; Stellar Mega Films; Cheerland Entertainment Organization
- Release dates: 6 September 2014 (Venice); 1 October 2014 (China)
- Running time: 179 minutes
- Countries: China; Hong Kong
- Language: Mandarin Chinese
- Budget: ¥70 million
- Box office: ¥51.49 million (China)

The Golden Era (Chinese: 黄金时代) is a 2014 biographical drama film directed by Ann Hui, written and executive produced by Li Qiang and starring Tang Wei and Feng Shaofeng. Tang portrays Xiao Hong, while Feng plays Xiao Jun, two of the most important writers of 20th century China. Other notable characters portrayed include Lu Xun (played by Wang Zhiwen), Duanmu Hongliang (played by Zhu Yawen) and Ding Ling (played by Hao Lei).

The film is a Chinese-Hong Kong co-production. It was screened out of competition at the 71st Venice International Film Festival. It was selected as the Hong Kong entry for the Best Foreign Language Film at the 87th Academy Awards, but was not nominated. The movie won Best Film and Best Director awards at the Hong Kong Film Awards.

== Plot ==
From the 1920s to the 1940s, China was marked by an era of high morale and boundless ambition. A group of young people experienced a period of laissez-faire, freely pursuing their dreams and love. Some pursued love in exile, while others hoped for the future of their country in struggle. Xiao Hong, a maverick woman, went into exile from the north to the south, from Harbin to Hong Kong, avoiding war while experiencing love and heartbreak. Her resilience and her struggle against death are reflected in her writing, which vividly captures her tumultuous life.

== Cast ==
- Tang Wei as Xiao Hong
- Feng Shaofeng as Xiao Jun
- Wang Zhiwen as Lu Xun
- Zhu Yawen as Duanmu Hongliang
- Huang Xuan as Luo Binji
- Hao Lei as Ding Ling
- Yuan Quan as Mei Zhi
- Tian Yuan as Bai Lang
- Ding Jiali as Xu Guangping
- Wang Qianyuan as Nie Gannu
- Sha Yi as Qun Shu
- Zu Feng as Luo Feng
- Zhang Yi as Jiang Xijin
- Feng Lei as Hu Feng
- Yuan Wenkang as Wang Enjia
- Chen Yuemo as Jin Jianxiao
- Wang Ziyi as Mei Lin
- Zhang Jiayi as Chow Ching-Wen
- Wang Jingchun as Lao Huang
- Yang Xue as Xu Yuehua
- Jiao Gang as Huang Yuan
- Zhang Bo as Wang Enjia
- Zhang Yao as Zhou Ying
- Tang Yixin as Cheng Juan
- Zhang Luyi as Mao Dun
- Wang Kai as Zhang Jinyi

== Production ==
=== Development ===
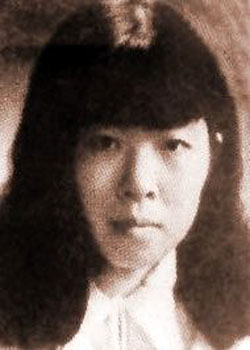
Chinese literary writer Xiao Hong, the subject of The Golden Era.

The idea for the film dates back to 2004, when Ann Hui and Chinese screenwriter Li Qiang discussed their interest in penning a story involving early 20th Century writers Xiao Hong (the pseudonym for Zhang Naiying) and Ding Ling. Research made by Hui and Qiang raised concerns over the possible censorship from the government because of Ding Ling's open criticism of the Communist Party throughout her life. In 2007, Hui and Qiang decided to focus on Xiao Hong, after a suggestion from Beijing production company Cheerland Films, whose first project was Hui's The Postmodern Life of My Aunt.

Although initially uninterested in Xiao Hong's work when she read them in the 1970s, Hui later reread her novels as part of better understanding the literary writer. Hui found it difficult to research Hong's own life due to the mystery that parts of her life were shrouded in, but remarked that the resulting screenplay for the film is “as close to the truth as we can get”.

=== Filming ===
The Golden Era production cost ¥70 million and lasted five months, during which shooting took place on location in Harbin, Wuhan, and Shanghai. Ann Hui would later describe the process of filming The Golden Era as making her “tense and nervous”, and playfully considered directing a comedy for her next film. In addition to dramatizations, The Golden Era incorporates fictional narration, breaking the fourth wall, and faux-documentary interviews throughout the film, an unorthodox structure that gives it elements of experimental cinema.

== Release ==
The Golden Era made its world premiere on September 6, 2014, at the 71st Venice International Film Festival, where it was shown out-of-competition and selected as the festival's closing film. Hui's previous full-length directorial feature, A Simple Life, also premiered at the Venice Film Festival in 2011, where it competed for the Golden Lion. Shortly after its world premiere, The Golden Era made its North American premiere at the 2014 Toronto International Film Festival, placed under the Masters category and distributed by China Lion Film Distribution Inc. The film continued to appear in other festivals, including the 27th Tokyo International Film Festival while making its first public release on October 1, 2014, in China.

On October 17, 2014, The Golden Era was released in the U.S. in a limited run that comprised just 15 theaters over a span of 6 weeks.

=== Home media ===
Edko Films Ltd. (安樂影片) released The Golden Era on Blu-ray under Region A coding on January 28, 2015. This physical release includes an interactive photo gallery and a making-of featurette.

== Reception ==
=== Box office ===
The film had earned ¥51.49 million at the Chinese box office. In its limited US release, The Golden Era earned $102,931 in 15 theaters.

=== Critical reception ===
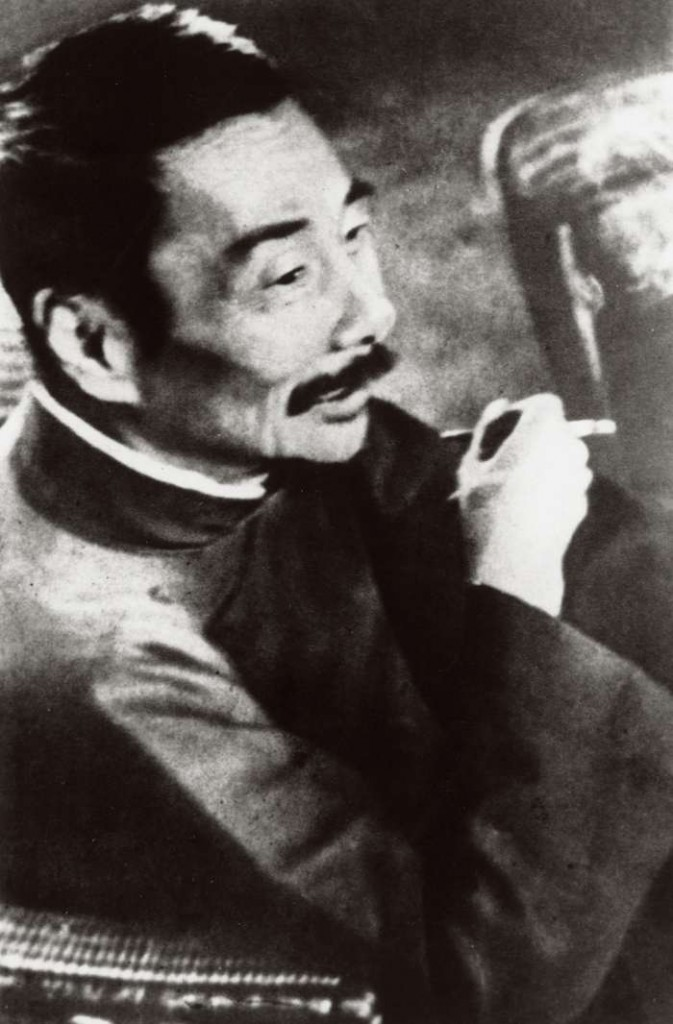
Lu Xun is also depicted in the film, and played by Wang Zhiwen. His portrayal of Lu was critically praised.

The Golden Era received mixed to positive reviews. Most reviews praised Ann Hui's direction and insightfulness into Xiao Hong's life, but criticized its running time and the loosely structured narrative. As of June 16, 2015, Rotten Tomatoes has given the film a 63% rating, compiled from five positive and three negative reviews. The average score from those reviews is 6/10.

Marcus Goh of Yahoo! Movies Singapore praised the film for its depiction of Xiao Hong, calling The Golden Era a "powerful coming-of-age story". Easternkicks.com's Andrew Heskins found that, though at times "overwhelming", complimented Ann Hui for "seeking to push her methods and styles of storytelling". The Boston Herald's James Verniere applauded the film for its "epic telling" of Xiao Hong. In contrast, Daniel M. Gold of The New York Times disliked the film's focus on the negative events of Hong's life, elaborating how this "unintentionally reduces her to a cliché — the starving young artist, done wrong by men — she surely would have rejected."

The editing and experimental nature of The Golden Era was commented on by critics. The South China Morning Post's Yvonne Teh found its 179-minute running time and use of different filmmaking elements resulted in an "emotional distant" movie, simultaneously criticizing Tang Wei's portrayal of Xiao Hong. With regards to its nonlinear narrative, Evelyn Kok of HK Magazine summated: "You can’t deny its masterful craft and intent, but it’s a portrait of a woman with her features all twisted and jumbled up."

Montreal Gazette's Liz Ferguson found the film informative and applauded its visual aesthetics, but described how Chinese viewers familiar with Xiao Hong's life are more likely to enjoy the film and can "fill in the blanks so much better" than Western viewers.

== Awards and nominations ==
Award	Category	Recipient(s)	Result
34th Hong Kong Film Awards
34th Hong Kong Film Awards	Best Film	Qin Hong	Won
34th Hong Kong Film Awards	Best Director	Ann Hui	Won
34th Hong Kong Film Awards	Best Screenplay	Li Qiang	Nominated
34th Hong Kong Film Awards	Best Actress	Tang Wei	Nominated
34th Hong Kong Film Awards	Best Supporting Actress	Hao Lei	Nominated
34th Hong Kong Film Awards	Best Cinematography	Wang Yu	Won
34th Hong Kong Film Awards	Best Film Editing	Manda Wai	Nominated
34th Hong Kong Film Awards	Best Art Direction	Zhao Hai	Won
34th Hong Kong Film Awards	Best Costume & Makeup Design	Man Lim Chung	Won
34th Hong Kong Film Awards	Best Original Film Score	Eli Marshall	Nominated
9th Asian Film Awards
9th Asian Film Awards	Best Director	Ann Hui	Won
9th Asian Film Awards	Best Actress	Tang Wei	Nominated
9th Asian Film Awards	Best Supporting Actor	Wang Zhiwen	Won
9th Asian Film Awards	Best Screenwriter	Li Qiang	Nominated
9th Asian Film Awards	Best Editor	Kwong Chi-leung & Manda Wai	Nominated
51st Golden Horse Film Festival Awards
51st Golden Horse Film Festival Awards	Best Feature Film	Qi Hong	Nominated
51st Golden Horse Film Festival Awards	Best Director	Ann Hui	Won
51st Golden Horse Film Festival Awards	Best Leading Actress	Tang Wei	Nominated
51st Golden Horse Film Festival Awards	Best Supporting Actress	Hao Lei	Nominated
51st Golden Horse Film Festival Awards	Best Original Screenplay	Li Qiang	Nominated

== See also ==
- List of submissions to the 87th Academy Awards for Best Foreign Language Film
- List of Hong Kong submissions for the Academy Award for Best Foreign Language Film
