= Jin Jianxiao =

Manchurian poet (1910–1936)

- Born: December 1910; Fengtian, Fengtian local government, Great Qing
- Died: 15 August 1936 (aged 25); Qiqihar, Heilongjiang, Great Manchuria
- Spouse: ?
- Children: Jin Lun (daughter)

Jin Jianxiao (Chinese: 金劍嘯, 1910 – 1936) was the penname of one Manchurian poet.

== Biography ==
Jin Jianxiao was born on December in 1910 at Fengtian city. His name is Jin Chengzai (金承載), courtesy name Peizhi (培之), pseudonym Mengchen (夢塵), penname Jianxiao (劍嘯), Jianshuo (健碩), Balai (巴來).

== See also ==
- Lu Xun
- Xiao Jun
- Xiao Hong
- Duanmu Hongliang
- Ding Ling
- Luo Binji
- Nie Gannu
- Shu Qun
- Luo Feng
- Jiang Xijin
- Hu Feng
- Zhou Jingwen
- Zhang Mutao
- Mao Dun
- Yu Yifu
