= Tales of Hulan River =

Novel by Xiao Hong

- Cover of a 1947 edition of Tales of Hulan River
- Author: Xiao Hong
- Language: Chinese
- Genre: Novel
- Published: 1941 (first serialized in 1940)
- Publisher: first serialized in Constellation Daily

Tales of Hulan River (Chinese: 呼兰河传; pinyin: Hū lán hé zhuàn) was the last work written by Xiao Hong, one of the most talented female literary figures of the Chinese Northeast Writers Group that were especially active in the 1930s and 1940s. The novel was first serialized in the newspaper Constellation Daily and then later published as a book, after which it received both criticism and praise.

Written in a poetical and vividly descriptive language, Tales of Hulan River delineates a world inside a rural town of Northeast China. The story is unfolded through the perspective of a young child, starting from the overall natural and societal environment to images of the compound where the narrator lives. Together with The Field of Life and Death, these two novels were deemed "the high points of Xiao Hong's writing career" according to Howard Goldblatt.

== Background ==
Cover of an English language translation of the novel

The first time this novel was formulated could be traced back to 1936 when Xiao Hong was still in Japan, and she started writing it in 1937 in Wuhan before she moved to Chongqing. However, as the Second Sino-Japanese War spread to Chongqing, Xiao Hong was forced to flee again and in 1940 with Duanmu Hongliang (端木蕻良), they went to Hong Kong, a British colony at that time. After fleeing between several cities across China, it is in Hong Kong where Xiao Hong was extremely far away from her birthplace in Northeast China that she accomplished her last novel Tales of Hulan River to reminisce the hometown she might never have a chance to go back to.

At that time when Xiao Hong was writing Tales of Hulan River, the majority of Chinese writers devoted themselves to wartime literature to struggle against the Japanese invaders, hence most of their works have shifted from the realm of art to the genre of propaganda. However, Xiao Hong still pursued her unique writing style and persisted in composing truly artistic and philosophical literature. This novel is considered to be an autobiographical work in remembrance of Xiao Hong's childhood in Manchuria, where her own experience was thought to be indirectly revealed by stories of the characters surrounding the narrator. The whole book is mostly built upon fact but there are also other opinions that fact and fiction are mixed within the whole story.

== Plot and characters ==
This novel is marked with the characteristics that there is no single thread and central figure throughout the seven chapters. Instead, each fragmented chapter is drawn together based on the same space-time dimension and through the eye of the child narrator who comes on stage in chapter 3. A camera-like scene full of immersive details is consummately presented by the author.

=== Chapter 1 and Chapter 2 ===
These two chapters delineate an overall societal picture and natural environment of the Hulan town.

Chapter 1 begins with the extremely frozen winter and then turns to the group portrait of various natives including the peddler, the physician Li Yongchun, widow Wang, etc., and their everyday life. The town is depicted as a closed society, where those natives all deaden to the surrounding world and lives of others [my translation]. One of the most sobering scenes centers around everyone's detachment toward that quagmire and its result in several calamities. The background and characteristics of these people are vague, where they are labeled as functional parts that constitute the society without any human agency and identity. Chapter 2 mainly narrates the story of how people in Hulan town are involved in several local events and festivals, revealing some of the pervasive superstitions in traditional beliefs. One of the events, the dance of the sorceress plays a significant role in plot development in Chapter 5.

Event's names in Chapter 2
| Chinese name | English Translation |
|---|---|
| 跳大神(tiao da shen) | The dance of the sorceress |
| 唱秧歌(chang yang ge) | The harvest dance |
| 放河灯(fang he deng) | Releasing river lanterns |
| 野台子戏(ye tai zi xi) | Outdoor opera performances |
| 四月十八娘娘庙大会 (si yue shi ba niang niang miao da hui) | The festival at the Temple of the Immortal Matron on the eighteenth day of the forth lunar month |

=== Chapter 3 and Chapter 4 ===
Chapter 3 and 4 turn to describe the narrator's family and other people living in the compound.

Chapters 3 is particularly devoted to the narrator's grandfather, but those warm scenes are only a transient flashback throughout the whole book [my translation]. "I" enjoy playing in the garden, studying poetry, and eating different food cooked by my granddad. This chapter also depicts many other narrator's family members including the narrator's grandmum who died because of her illness. "I" dislike her as she cannot bear my naughty behavior. Chapter 4 then turns to portray the narrator's family compound and how different types of tenants live their lives. The house consists of seven axisymmetric buildings standing in a line with a gateway in the middle that appears to be imposing, along with six more shabby rooms, three dilapidated huts, and three milling sheds. But it is viewed to be dreary from the perspective of the young narrator, where the narrator repeated it several times throughout the chapter. The tenants dwelling in are described as coarse individuals including hog farmers, bean-flour sifters, a miller, a carter and his family.

=== Chapter 5, Chapter 6, and Chapter 7 ===
The last three chapters are respectively unfolded surrounding three characters: The child bride, Second Uncle You, and Harelip Feng.

Chapter 5 is a tragic story of Xiao Tuan Yuan, an arranged child bride of the carter family. Once she arrives, many people feel curious about her and want to have a look. After a few days, the child bride's mother-in-law starts to beat her, making her become even more of the focal topic of conversation among neighbors. Later, she is then thought to be "sick" and the dance of the sorceress is set up to drive away from the evil spirit together with loads of special potions and magical charms offered by different people, but the child bride's illness becomes more serious so a soothsayer is invited. However, nothing seems to work and the sicker the child bride is thought to be, the harder her mother-in-law will beat her. Finally, the family turns to the sorceress again. This time the child bride is bathed with extremely hot water in front of the public. Suffering from all those afflictions, the child bride died eventually.

Chapter 6 talks about the narrators' relative Second Uncle You whose name "You" comes from his nickname "Youzi" (有子). From the narrator's perspective, he appears to be a weird vagrant who just sleeps wherever there is a place available for him with his jumbled bedding. He wears a straw hat without a brim, a gown going down to his knees and a pair of shoes lacking either soles or heels. Later, the narrator discovers Second Uncle You stealing different kinds of goods but then also joins him, and they both choose to conceal the secret for each other. There is also a scene describing how others believe that he is trying to commit suicide by hanging himself or jumping down the well but it isn't the truth. The behavior of Second Uncle You indicates his position as completely an outsider of the household.

The last chapter concentrates on the character Harelip Feng who is a miller, poor but honest. One day, when "I" go to the mill to buy some rice cake, "I" accidentally discover Harelip Feng's wife and child who have never been talked about by him before. Harelip Feng comes to my grandfather for help because his proprietor's wife is extremely irritated with the presence of his family members who are thought to ruin the "Fengshui" (风水), and my grandfather finally agrees to provide them with a hay storage shed for temporary settlement. Such an affair soon be known to the entire compound and almost everyone starts to discuss and gossip about Harelip Feng's wife Big Sister Wang. Another "excited" activity for neighbors is to gather together to watch the fun of anything related to Harelip Feng's family. Unfortunately, Big Sister Wang died after giving birth to the second baby later in September, but Harelip Feng still holds a firm belief on life. He takes all responsibilities for his work as well as two children instead of filling himself with sorrow as is expected by everyone in the compound.

Character's names in the last three chapters
| Chapter | Chinese name | English Translation |
|---|---|---|
| 5 | 小团圆 (Xiao Tuanyuan) | The child bride |
| 6 | 有二伯 (You Erbo) | Second Uncle You |
| 7 | 冯歪嘴子 (Feng Waizuizi) | Harelip Feng |
| 7 | 王大姐 (Wang Dajie) | Big Sister Wang (Harelip Feng's wife) |

== Literary criticism and significance ==
Once Tales of Hulan River came out, it received criticism from Communist critics who considered it a literary retrograde without any connection to the masses because its content did not serve the major political purpose.

Hu Feng (胡风) once criticized in his epilogue for The Field of Life and Death that this novel was built upon random sketches without the intention to organize a central theme. Similar to it, fragmented stories, the absence of central figures, and the nonlinear structure were all focal aspects that critics sought to criticize for Tales of Hulan River. However, at that time, criticism were mostly raised by male intellectuals like Hu Feng. Hence they might failed to realize all the irregularity shown in Tales of Hulan River are likely to be Xiao Hong's intention to reconstruct her past through a feminine way.

However, it way also defended by writers such as Mao Dun (茅盾), who wrote a preface for this book in 1946. How highly Mao Dun thought of this work can be seen from his laudatory description that says "a narrative poem, a colorful genre painting, a haunting song." He argued it is because of her innovative writing style and the unorthodox design of the work which appeared to be a departure from the genre of traditional autobiography that makes the novel unique and intriguing. But on the other side, he also pointed out one minor deficiency. He supposed when depicting the nightmare life people experience in the Hulan town, Xiao Hong seemed to overlook the impact of oppression from the feudal system and Japanese invaders that could have on those depressed residents but merely showing their inherent conservatism as a cause.

As evidence of the cultural impact of Tales of Huan River, excerpts of it appeared in the 2016 anthology The Big Red Book of Modern Chinese Literature, which presents itself as a definitive compilation of the most significant Chinese literary works in recent times.

== Publication history ==
The manuscript was first serialized in Constellation Daily, a Hong Kong local newspaper, in 1940 but unfortunately, Xiao Hong died in 1942. Tales of Hulan River was eventually published in book form in Guilin in 1941.

The English translation of Tales of Hulan River was written by Howard Goldblatt. Together with the translation of The Field of Life and Death, they were originally published in one volume in 1979 but the part of Tales of Hulan River was incomplete since only Chapter 1-5 were translated. The complete translation of both two novels in the same book The Field of Life and Death & Tales of Hulan River were released in 2002.

== See also ==
- The Field of Life and Death, Xiao Hong's other acclaimed novel published in 1934-35
- Xiao Hong
- Howard Goldblatt
- Northeast China folk religion
