= Great Unity Herald =

Manchukuo newspaper (1932–1945)

- Type: Daily newspaper
- Owner: State Council of Manchukuo
- Founder(s): Wang Guanglie; Togō Fumio
- Founded: February 1932
- Ceased publication: August 1945
- Political alignment: Pro-Manchukuo
- Language: Chinese
- City: Changchun
- Country: Manchukuo

The Great Unity Herald (Note: Known in Chinese as 大同報 (Datong bao).) (Kangde News (Note: Known in Chinese as Kangde xinwen.) from 1943) was the official daily newspaper published by the State Council of Manchukuo in Changchun from February 1932 until it ceased publication August 1945. Considered to be the largest and most circulated paper in the region, it was one of the most influential publications within Manchukuo and other parts of Japanese-occupied China.

== History ==
The paper's publication began in February 1932, just a month before the official proclamation of Manchukuo in March. Its first chief editor was Wang Guanglie, and the associate editor was Togō Fumio, a consultant for the Japanese Kwantung Army in Northeast China who had previously founded the Kwantung Herald in 1920. The Great Unity Herald received 60,000 to 80,000 yuan annually from the government, more than any other newspaper in the country. It generally functioned as a propaganda mouthpiece for the Japanese military administration, with much of its reporting being sympathetic to the Imperial Japanese Army and supporting the invasion of China. Despite its ownership by the state, however, many of its early writers engaged in resistance movements and were eventually persecuted by the authorities for resistance activities and fled Manchukuo.

=== Resistance to Japanese rule ===
Following the Mukden Incident and the closure of many Chinese-language newspapers, the only anti-Japanese press in the northeast came from Chen Hua and his Great Unity Club literary supplement. During his brief tenure with the paper in 1933, Chen published so much controversial material in the Unity Club and his Night Watcher column that the state censors engaged in the practice of “digging the word”, where blank spaces were left in lieu of certain phrases. He was later arrested and remained in prison for a short period until Prime Minister Zheng Xiaoxu bailed him out. Many left-wing and anti-Japanese activists, including those considered to be part of the Northeast Writers Group, also wrote for Night Watcher, using euphemisms or agreeing to have portions of their work left blank in exchange for its publication.

Following Chen's resignation, the paper remained absent of any anti-Japanese leanings until Sun Ling, a former post office director in Harbin, founded the New Literary World in Manchuria supplement in February 1935. Only lasting until October of the following year, it ceased publication after Sun fled Manchukuo following the paper's Japanese director, Yubata Shōichi, announcing his intention to formally file charges with the police after the publication of a special issue memorializing Soviet writer Maxim Gorky. In July 1941, the Our Literature supplement was launched by former editor Li Jifeng and published anti-Nazi essays. As a result, Li was arrested five months later and the section gradually shuttered after an essay supporting Lu Xun and the League of Left-Wing Writers was published. The paper's Literature and Art supplement, which was less outspokenly anti-Japanese, also published several notable works of poetry that criticized the Japanese administration; including from Li Zhengzhong.

== Sources ==
- Culver, Annika A.; Smith, Norman (2019-12-09). Manchukuo Perspectives: Transnational Approaches to Literary Production. Hong Kong University Press. ISBN 978-988-8528-13-4.
- Shi, Chen (2020-01-09), "Fairy Tales and the Creation of the "Future Nation" of Manchukuo", Manchukuo Perspectives, Hong Kong University Press, pp. 28–43, doi:10.5790/hongkong/9789888528134.003.0003, ISBN 978-988-8528-13-4
- Lei, Jiang (2020-01-09), "Spiritual Resistance: A Study of the Phenomenon of Resistance Literature in Supplements of Manchukuo's Datong bao [Great Unity Herald]", Manchukuo Perspectives, Hong Kong University Press, pp. 44–63, doi:10.5790/hongkong/9789888528134.003.0004, ISBN 978-988-8528-13-4
