= Chinese Northeast Writers Group =

The Chinese Northeast Writers Group (simplified Chinese: 东北作家群; traditional Chinese: 東北作家群) were a group of writers from Manchukuo, a puppet state established by Imperial Japan in Northeast China. This group comprised writers from the region who refused to acknowledge Manchukuo's secession from China and faced with severe oppression and persecution by the Japanese for their political activism, leading for many of these authors to flee to central Chinese provinces like Hebei and Henan. Their works predominantly expressed the profound sorrow of national subjugation and the suffering of the populace under occupation alongside a strong sense of patriotism for China and anti-Japanese sentiments.

== Representative Authors and Works ==
- Xiao Hong (萧红): The Field of Life and Death (生死场), Tales of Hulan River (呼兰河传), Ma Boel (马伯乐), and Market Street (商市街).
- Xiao Jun (萧军): Village in August (八月的乡村).
- Duanmu Hongliang (端木蕻良):Hatred (憎恨), Khorchin Grassland (科尔沁旗草原)
