= Falling Flowers =

- Official poster
- Traditional Chinese: 蕭紅
- Simplified Chinese: 萧红
- Hanyu Pinyin: Xiāo Hóng
- Directed by: Huo Jianqi
- Written by: Yi Fuhai; Su Xiaowei
- Produced by: Zhang Zhe; Yi Fuhai; Zhao Haicheng
- Starring: Song Jia; Huang Jue; Jaco Zhang; Wang Renjun
- Cinematography: Shi Luan
- Edited by: Yu Xi
- Music by: Shu Nan
- Production companies: Heilongjiang Provincial Party Committee Publicity Department; Harbin Municipal Committee Publicity Department; China Film; Heilongjiang Provincial Broadcasting Film & TV Office; Talent International Film; China Movie Channel
- Distributed by: China Film Group Corporation
- Release dates: 24 May 2012 (Beijing); 20 June 2012 (SIFF); 8 March 2013 (China)
- Running time: 120 minutes
- Country: China
- Language: Mandarin

Falling Flowers is a 2012 Chinese biographical drama film directed by Huo Jianqi and written by Yi Fuhai and Su Xiaowei. It stars Song Jia, Huang Jue, Jaco Zhang, and Wang Renjun. The film premiered at the 2012 Shanghai International Film Festival, and released in China on March 8, 2013.

== Cast ==
- Song Jia as Xiao Hong, a Chinese writer from Hulan county, Heilongjiang Province.
  - Wang Xinyi as Little Xiao Hong.
- Huang Jue as Xiao Jun, Xiao Hong's husband.
- Jaco Zhang as Luo Binji, a Chinese writer, Xiao Hong's friend.
- Wang Renjun as Duanmu Hongliang, Xiao Hong's best friend and lover.
- Wu Chao as Mr. Wang
- Li Yiling as Sister
- Mi Zi'an as A Xu
- Sun Weimin as Lu Xun.
- Zhang Tong as Xu Guangping, Lu Xun's husband.
- Teddy as Ni Dalu
- Lu Siyuan as Shu Qun
- Zhang Weizhi as Xiao Hong's father.
- Yang Liping as Xiao Hong's stepmother.
- Li Hancheng as Grandfather.

== Production ==
On August 4, 2011, in the Great Hall of the People, the China Film Group Corporation announced that Wang Luodan had joined the cast as Xiao Hong, but Wang was too busy, she refused to accept the role. On January 4, 2012, Song Jia was cast as Xiao Hong.

Filming took place in Beijing, Shanghai, Harbin, Shenyang, Jilin, Wuhan, Chongqing, and Hong Kong.

== Release ==
The film premiered in Beijing on May 24, 2012 with wide-release in China on the International Women's Day.

In spite of the praise for the lead actress Song Jia's performance as Xiao Hong, the film received generally mixed reviews. The Hollywood Reporter describes the film as "highly poetic, but lacks drama and warmth."

== Accolades ==
Date	Award	Category	Recipient(s) and nominee(s)	Result	Notes
2010	Xia Yan Award	Best Screenplay	Yi Fuhai, Su Xiaowei	Won	
2012	15th Shanghai International Film Festival	Best Feature Film		Nominated	
2012	15th Shanghai International Film Festival	Best Cinematography	Shi Luan	Won	
2012	Five One Project Award			Won	
2012	55th Asia-Pacific Film Festival	Best Actress	Song Jia	Nominated	
2013	29th Golden Rooster Awards	Best Actress	Song Jia	Won	
2013	29th Golden Rooster Awards	Best Cinematography	Shi Luan	Nominated	
2013	29th Golden Rooster Awards	Best Animation	Lü Feng	Nominated	
2013	15th Huabiao Awards	Outstanding Film		Nominated	
2013	15th Huabiao Awards	Outstanding Director	Huo Jianqi	Nominated	
2013	15th Huabiao Awards	Outstanding Actress	Song Jia	Nominated	
2013	Chinese American Film Festival	Best Actress	Song Jia	Won	
2014	China Film Director's Guild Awards	Best Film		Nominated	
2014	China Film Director's Guild Awards	Best Director	Huo Jianqi	Nominated	
2014	China Film Director's Guild Awards	Best Actor	Huang Jue	Nominated	
2014	China Film Director's Guild Awards	Best Actress	Song Jia	Nominated	
2014	China Film Director's Guild Awards	Best Screenplay	Yi Fuhai, Su Xiaowei	Nominated	
2014	Vancouver Chinese Film Festival	Best Actress	Song Jia	Won	
2014	Vancouver Chinese Film Festival	Best Director	Huo Jianqi	Won	
