= Resurrection (2025 film) =

2025 Chinese epic science fiction drama film by Bi Gan

- Chinese theatrical release poster
- Chinese: 狂野时代
- Hanyu Pinyin: Kuángyě Shídài
- Directed by: Bi Gan
- Screenplay by: Bi Gan; Zhai Xiaohui
- Story by: Bi Gan
- Produced by: Shan Zuolong; Yang Lele; Charles Gillibert
- Starring: Jackson Yee; Shu Qi; Mark Chao; Li Gengxi; Huang Jue; Chen Yongzhong
- Cinematography: Dong Jingsong
- Edited by: Bi Gan; Bai Xue
- Music by: M83
- Production companies: Huace Pictures; Dangmai Films; CG Cinéma; Arte France Cinéma; Obluda Films
- Distributed by: Huace Pictures (China); Les Films du Losange (France)
- Release dates: 22 May 2025 (Cannes); 22 November 2025 (China); 10 December 2025 (France)
- Running time: 159 minutes
- Countries: China; France
- Language: Mandarin
- Box office: $27 million

Resurrection (Chinese: 狂野时代; lit. 'Wild Times') is a 2025 epic science fiction drama film written and directed by Bi Gan. Set in a future where humanity has given up dreaming, it stars Jackson Yee as a dying monster who becomes different characters as he relives 100 years across four dreams, aided by a woman (Shu Qi) using the lost techniques of cinema. The six segments of the film each corresponds to one of the six senses recognized in Buddhist thought in order of: Sight, Hearing, Taste, Smell, Touch, and Mind.

The film had its world premiere at the main competition of the 2025 Cannes Film Festival on 22 May, where it won the Prix Spécial. It was theatrically released in China on 22 November by Huace Pictures, and in France on 10 December by Les Films du Losange.

== Plot ==
In a world where humanity gave up dreaming in exchange for longevity, a woman tracks down a monstrous "Deliriant" who hides inside movies to continue dreaming. Inside a silent film, she finds him eating poppies at an opium den to desperately fuel his dreams, which are killing him. She cannot understand his compulsion, but, finding a movie projector inside the Deliriant, loads it with film to let him replay his past life in dreams before dying.

In the first dream, in a bombed-out city, the Deliriant is Qiu, the young companion of a musician hunted by authorities. The musician, infatuated with Qiu's voice, stabbed himself in both ears and sought to die together on train tracks, forcing Qiu to kill him. The Commander captures Qiu and decodes the musician's secret orders to transport a "suitcase", coded in Bach's "Come, Sweet Death" by music cipher, even as he is pressured to extradite Qiu and spare himself from the musician's madness. Tortured to give up the "suitcase", Qiu leads the Commander into a disorienting mirror shop as a trap, baiting him with a case containing only a theremin. Revealing himself as the true "suitcase", Qiu stabs the Commander in one ear and flees by train. The Commander stabs himself in the other ear, then catches up to the train, where he plays the Bach piece on theremin while deafened. He stabs Qiu, releasing blinding light and flame.

In the second dream, the Deliriant is a former monk who guides looters to an abandoned monastery, only to get left behind overnight. He finds an unfamiliar Buddha statue; it crumbles at the touch, but then speaks in a dream, explaining how to knock out his aching tooth. Doing so releases the "Spirit of Bitterness", who takes the form of the monk's father. Heeding the Buddha's prophecy that it would reach Enlightenment on this day by discovering the bitterest thing of all, the Spirit offers to absolve the monk's sins if he helps. After seeing the Spirit snoring as his father, the monk regrets having mercy-killed his real father, who contracted rabies. The next morning, a lone dog leaves the monastery.

In the third dream, the Deliriant is Jia, a con artist who schemes to win prize money offered by mob boss "the Old Man" in his search for a genuine psychic. Jia recruits a riddle-loving orphan girl as accomplice in a card trick to fake identifying playing cards by smell, and, in return, promises to help solve a profound riddle left written on a banknote when the girl's father left her. Posing as Jia's daughter, the girl outwits the Old Man's trials while blindfolded, identifying, by deduction, an ace of spades burned to ashes. Jia splits their prize and skips town, breaking his promise, but finds the riddle's answer written on a banknote, revealing it to be a juvenile joke. Fellow con men rob him at knifepoint, but he guards this one banknote with his life. The Old Man summons the girl for the true purpose of his search: having abandoned his own daughter long ago, he longs to read a burned letter found after she died in a fire. Smelling the ashes, the girl speaks out a letter to an absent father.

In the last dream, in a port city on New Year's Eve, 1999, the Deliriant is "Apollo", a reckless young hoodlum who has never been kissed. He falls for a free-spirited girl, "Tai Zhaomei", and they aimlessly wander through back alleys and abandoned buildings until mob boss Mr. Luo comes for her. Luo and Tai are both undead vampires; Tai feeds on blood supplied by Luo rather than bite victims, and cannot leave his employ because Luo has the soil from her grave. Apollo barges into Luo's karaoke bar to fight for Tai; hopelessly outnumbered, he is beaten, shot and left for dead, leaving Tai bewildered by his devotion. The scene time-lapses to predawn, when Apollo and Tai run breathlessly to steal a docked boat. Unsurprised by her true nature, he lets her drink his blood. They kiss passionately in the moments before sunrise.

The woman enters the final dream, costuming Apollo as the Deliriant, and interring him in a vault filled with liquid. She finally understands why he dreams, and speaks to him through a silent film title card. In a movie theater made of wax, silhouettes of light fill the seats, then disappear as the film ends and the theater melts.

== Cast ==
- Jackson Yee as Deliriant / Qiu Moyun / Mongrel / Jia Shengjun / Apollo
- Shu Qi as The Big Other / Mother / Voiceover
- Mark Chao as Commander
- Li Gengxi as Tai Zhaomei
- Huang Jue as Mr. Luo
- Chen Yongzhong as Spirit of Bitterness
- Zhang Zhijian as Old Master
- Chloe Maayan as the Serving Girl
- Yan Nan as Instrumentalist
- Guo Mucheng as Little Girl

== Production ==
Huace Pictures, which had funded Bi Gan's previous film, Long Day's Journey Into Night (2018), stated in 2021 that they would produce Bi's next, yet untitled, work. The film was reportedly planned to go into production in 2022 but Bi was still finishing the script in September 2023, with the film receiving the English title, Resurrection. Shu Qi and Jackson Yee were cast in the lead roles, and Dong Jingsong was attached as cinematographer, having previously worked with Bi on Long Day's Journey Into Night.

According to Bi, the film's use of a "movie monster" references German expressionist cinema, notably horror movies such as The Cabinet of Dr. Caligari (1920) and Nosferatu (1922); its first chapter is set in the early 20th century, "[employing] the cinematic language of that era". Techniques seen in the film include stop motion, reverse motion, double exposure, and time-lapse photography.

=== Filming ===
Principal photography was divided into three phases, with the first phase beginning filming in April 2024, while the second wrapped shooting in September 2024. Filming took place on location in multiple cities, including Chongqing and Copenhagen. The third phase of filming resumed in the fourth quarter of 2024 and concluded in April 2025.

In a press conference, Jackson Yee stated that the film's 30-minute long take needed more than half a month to shoot – it had to be filmed at night, and only one take could be done each day. Bi said it was a relatively easy part of the filming process, as the crew had prior experience shooting the long takes in his previous two movies, Kaili Blues (2015) and Long Day's Journey Into Night. Dong shot the long take using the DJI Ronin 4D.

=== Post-production ===
A rough cut was finished in May 2025, just days before its premiere at Cannes; Bi later said that the theatrical version would be different from the cut shown at Cannes, as further editing and work on visual effects was needed.

== Release ==
Resurrection premiered in competition at the 78th Cannes Film Festival on 22 May 2025. It was a late addition to the festival, not having been included in the initial shortlist announcement on 10 April 2025; it was added on 8 May 2025. The delay was attributed to the film first needing to obtain domestic approval from the National Radio and Television Administration, which eventually granted it a public screening license. It also competed in the Competition section of the 30th Busan International Film Festival on 23 September 2025, and in the Official Section of the 70th Valladolid International Film Festival.

In an earnings call in April 2025, Huace Pictures gave it an estimated release date of the second half of 2025 or 2026. During an interview at Cannes in May 2025, Bi said he expected it to be released in 2025.

Janus Films acquired North American distribution rights after the festival wrapped. The film received a limited release in the United States in December 2025. The film was later added to The Criterion Collection through their Criterion Premieres line in April 2026, for physical distribution and streaming in North America.

Resurrection released in cinemas in China on 22 November 2025 by Huace Pictures. In Hong Kong it was released on 27 November, and in Taiwan on 28 November.

Following its UK premiere at the BFI London Film Festival in October 2025, Resurrection was released in UK and Irish cinemas by Trinity CineAsia on 13 March, 2026.

== Reception ==
=== Box office ===
On its debut weekend in China, Resurrection opened in first place at the box office grossing RMB116.8 million ($16.5 million), topping Demon Slayer: Kimetsu no Yaiba – The Movie: Infinity Castle ($15.6 million) and Now You See Me: Now You Don't ($7 million). It was Bi Gan's second film to debut at number one at the Chinese box office, following Long Day's Journey Into Night in 2019.

=== Critical response ===
Resurrection received generally positive reviews from critics, who praised Bi Gan's direction and style, though some took issue with its opaque narrative. On the review aggregator website Rotten Tomatoes, 91% of 94 critics' reviews are positive, with an average rating of 8.3/10. The website's critics consensus reads, "Pushing against the boundaries of storytelling with overwhelming style, Bi Gan's Resurrection is equal parts inscrutable and invigoratingly awake to the endless possibilities of cinema." Metacritic, which uses a weighted average, assigned the film a score of 87 out of 100, based on 25 critics, indicating "universal acclaim" reviews.

Peter Bradshaw of The Guardian gave it four out of five stars, writing, "It is a deeply mysterious film whose enigma extends to the title – is what is happening 'resurrection' in any clear transformative sense? [...] Asking or answering these questions may not be the film's point and its riddling quality, combined with its spectacular visual effects, may leave some audiences agnostic – and I myself wasn't sure about the silent-movie type effects. Yet it’s a work of real artistry." For The New York Times, Manohla Dargis said, "What makes the film especially delectable is that Bi Gan changes visual styles and narrative techniques throughout this movie odyssey. [...] Chockablock with nods to other films and filmmakers, Resurrection is a cinephile's delight. [It] may be wreathed in melancholy, but Bi Gan's own journey through cinema is enlivening and encouraging."

A few critics singled out the film's long take that appears near the end. Ben Croll of TheWrap called it a "breathlessly conceived and astonishingly pulled-off [...] bravura sequence"; The Film Stage's Su Zhuo-ning wrote, "The New Year's Eve escapade, in particular, is an absolute marvel. There's a casual fluidity to how things unfold as two characters make their way through the neighborhood that immediately creates a surreal, trance-like atmosphere. [...] Such choices—e.g. when the frame's entire color scheme changes upon a character's forceful entry into the room—take your breath away."

In a negative review for Deadline, Damon Wise criticized the film's storyline: "While the visuals are endlessly inventive, the narrative is simply just endless; none of these vignettes seem to have any plot or resolution whatsoever, which is certainly cool as a concept but not so much fun to watch. [...] Resurrection (whatever that title really means) is oddly liberating, being a film that — it would appear — operates on dream logic and leaves interpretation up to the individual."

=== Accolades ===
Award	Date of ceremony	Category	Recipient(s)	Result	Ref.
Cannes Film Festival	24 May 2025	Palme d'Or	Bi Gan	Nominated	
Cannes Film Festival	24 May 2025	Special Award (Prix Spécial)	Bi Gan	Won	
Busan International Film Festival	26 September 2025	Artistic Contribution Award	Liu Qiang and Tu Nan	Won	
Valladolid International Film Festival	1 November 2025	Golden Spike	Resurrection	Nominated	
Gotham Independent Film Awards	1 December 2025	Best International Feature	Charles Gillibert, Yang Lele, and Shan Zuolong	Nominated	
Belgian Film Critics Association	11 January 2026	Grand Prix	Resurrection	Nominated	
