= Liang Shih-chiu =

Chinese educator, writer, translator, literary theorist and lexicographer

- 梁實秋
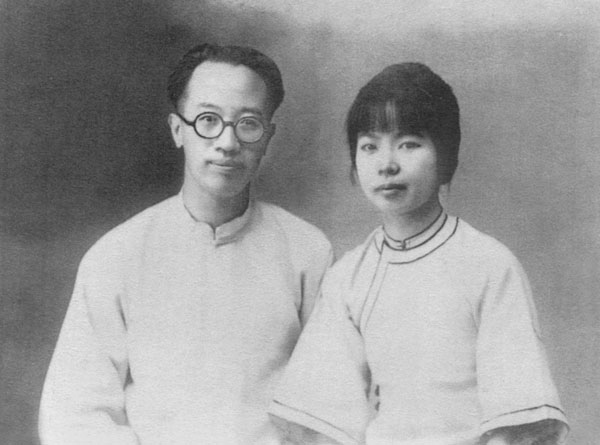
- Liang with his first wife, Cheng Jishu (程季淑)
- Born: January 6, 1903; Beijing, China
- Died: November 3, 1987 (aged 84); Taipei, Taiwan
- Occupation: Writer
- Children: 3

Chinese name
- Traditional Chinese: 梁實秋
- Simplified Chinese: 梁实秋
Transcriptions
Standard Mandarin
- Hanyu Pinyin: Liáng Shíqiū
- Wade–Giles: Liang Shih-ch'iu

Liang Shih-chiu (January 6, 1903 – November 3, 1987), also romanized as Liang Shiqiu, and also known as Liang Chih-hwa (梁治華), was a renowned Chinese educator, writer, translator, literary theorist and lexicographer.

== Biography ==
Liang was born in Beijing in 1903. His father, Liang Xianxi (梁咸熙), was a xiucai in the Qing dynasty. He was educated at Tsinghua College in Beijing from 1915 to 1923. He went on to study at Colorado College and later pursued his graduate studies at Harvard and Columbia Universities. At Harvard, he studied literary criticism under Irving Babbitt, whose New Humanism helped shape his conservative literary tenets.

After his return to China in 1926, he began a long career as a professor of English at several universities, including Peking University, Tsingtao University, and Jinan University. He also served as the editor of a succession of literary supplements and periodicals, including the famous Crescent Moon Monthly (1928–1933). During this period he published a number of literary treatises which showed the strong influence of Babbitt and demonstrated his belief that human life and human nature are the only proper subjects for literature. The best known among these are The Romantic and the Classical, Literature and Revolution, The Seriousness of Literature, and The Permanence of Literature. In each of these treatises, he upheld the intrinsic value of literature as something that transcends social class and strongly opposed using literature for propagandist purposes. These pronouncements and his dislike for the excessive influence of Jean-Jacques Rousseau and other Romanticists in China triggered a polemic war between him and Lu Xun and drew the concerted attacks of leftist writers. His major works as a translator included James Barrie's Peter Pan, George Eliot's Silas Marner and Mr. Gilfil's Love Story, and Emily Brontë's Wuthering Heights.

In 1949, to escape the civil war, Liang fled to Taiwan where he taught at Taiwan Normal University until his retirement in 1966. During this period, he established himself as a lexicographer by bringing out a series of English-Chinese and Chinese-English dictionaries. His translation works included George Orwell's Animal Farm and Marcus Aurelius' Meditations.

Liang is now remembered chiefly as the first Chinese scholar to single-handedly translate the complete works of Shakespeare into Chinese. This project, which was first conceived in 1930, was completed in 1967. He then embarked on another monumental project – that of writing a comprehensive history of English literature in Chinese, which was completed in 1979 and consists of a three-volume history and a companion set of Selected Readings in English Literature in Chinese translation, also in three volumes. Liang's literary fame rests, first and foremost, on the hundreds of short essays on familiar topics, especially those written over a span of more than four decades (1940–1986) and collected under the general title of Yashe Xiaopin, now available in English translation under the title From a Cottager’s Sketchbook.

== Bibliography ==
- "The Fine Art of Reviling". English translation by W.B. Pettus. Los Angeles : Auk Press, 1936.
- From a Cottager's Sketchbook, vol. 1. Tr. Ta-tsun Chen. HK: Chinese University Press, 2005.
- "Fusing With Nature." Tr. Kirk Denton. In K. Denton, ed., Modern Chinese Literary Thought: Writings on Literature, 1893–1945. Stanford: Stanford UP, 1996, 213–17.
- "The Generation Gap." Tr. Cynthia Wu Wilcox. The Chinese Pen, (Autumn, 1985): 33–39.
- "Haircut" [Lifa]. Tr. David Pollard. In Pollard, ed., The Chinese Essay. NY: Columbia UP, 2000, 230–33.
- "Listening to Plays" [Ting xi]. Tr. David Pollard. In Pollard, ed., The Chinese Essay. NY: Columbia UP, 2000, 233–37.
- "Literature and Revolution." Tr. Alison Bailey. In K. Denton, ed., Modern Chinese Literary Thought: Writings on Literature, 1893–1945. Stanford: SUP, 1996, 307–15.
- "Men." Tr. Shih Chao-ying. The Chinese Pen (Spring, 1974): 40–44.
- "On Time." Tr. King-fai Tam. In Goldblatt and Lau, eds., The Columbia Anthology of Modern Chinese Literature. NY: Columbia UP, 1995, 660–63.
- "Sickness" [Bing]. Tr. David Pollard. In Pollard, ed., The Chinese Essay. NY: Columbia UP, 2000, 227–30.
- Sketches of a Cottager. Tr. Chao-ying Shih. Taipei, 1960.
- "Snow." Tr. Nancy E. Chapman and King-fai Tam. In Goldblatt and Lau, eds., The Columbia Anthology of Modern Chinese Literature. NY: Columbia UP, 1995, 6664–67.
- "Women." Tr. Shih Chao-ying. The Chinese Pen (Winter, 1972): 23–29.

== Portrait ==
- Liang Shiqiu. A Portrait by Kong Kai Ming at Portrait Gallery of Chinese Writers (Hong Kong Baptist University Library).
