= Bi Gan (filmmaker) =

Chinese film director

- 毕赣
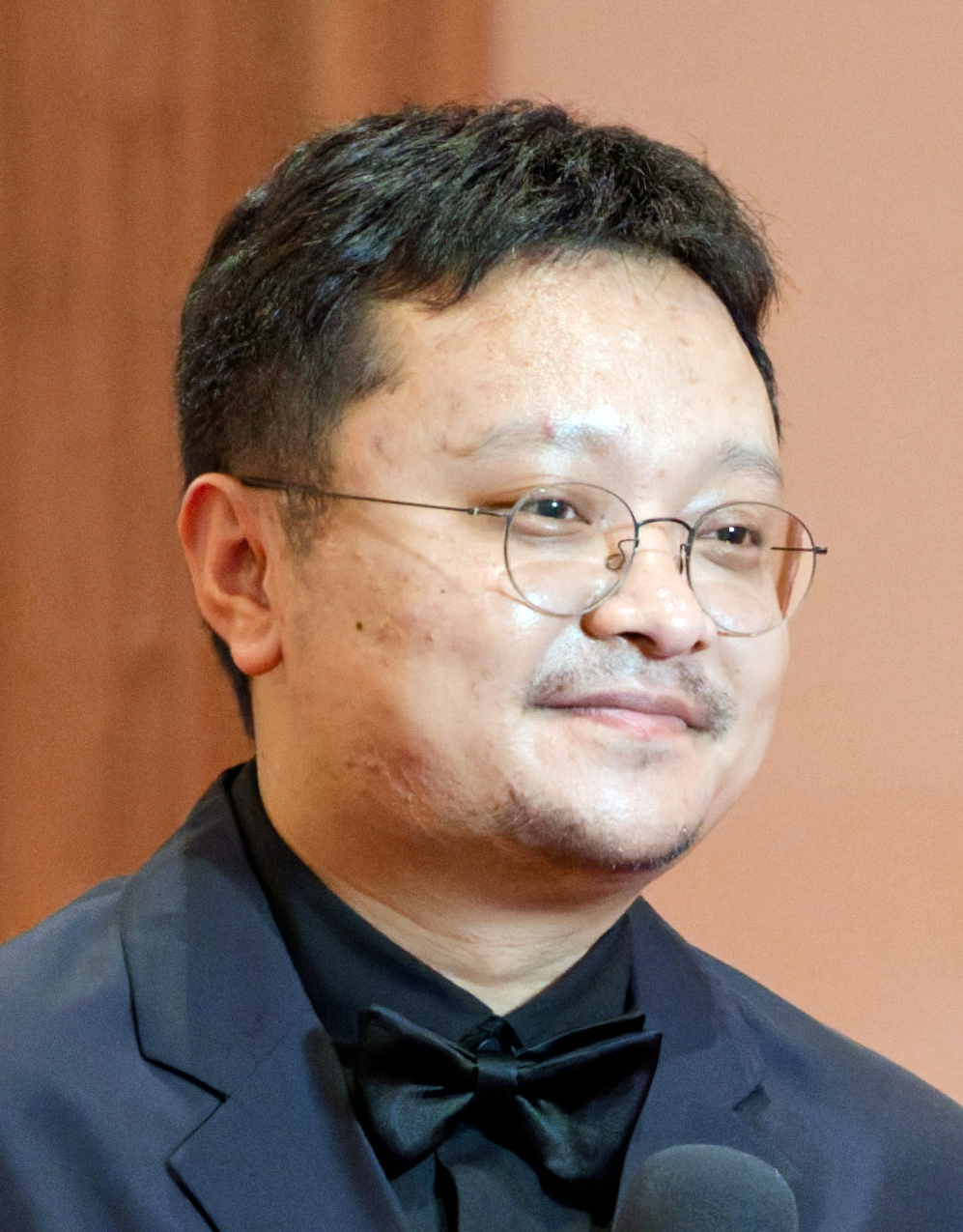
- Bi at the 2025 Cannes Film Festival
- Born: 4 June 1989 (age 37); Kaili City, Guizhou, China
- Occupations: Film director; screenwriter; poet; photographer
- Years active: 2010–present

Bi Gan (simplified Chinese: 毕赣; traditional Chinese: 畢贛, born 4 June 1989) is a Chinese film director, screenwriter, poet, and photographer.

Bi's feature directorial debut, Kaili Blues (2015), earned him Best New Director at the 52nd Golden Horse Awards, Best Emerging Director at the 68th Locarno Film Festival, and the Montgolfière d’Or at the 37th Three Continents Festival in Nantes. His follow-up feature, Long Day's Journey into Night (2018), was selected for the Un Certain Regard section at the 71st Festival de Cannes and earned him a Best Director nomination at the 55th Golden Horse Awards. His third feature film, Resurrection (2025), premiered in Competition at the 78th Festival de Cannes and was presented with a Special Award by the jury.

In June 2025, Bi was invited to join the Directors Branch of the Academy of Motion Picture Arts and Sciences.

== Biography ==
Bi was born in Kaili City in Guizhou Province on 4 June 1989. He is an ethnic Miao.

From 2008 to 2011, Bi Gan studied television directing at the Radio, Film, and Television Cadre College in Taiyuan, Shanxi. In 2013, the college was renamed the Communication University of Shanxi.

During his college years, Bi watched Andrei Tarkovsky's Stalker, later stating in an interview, "Cinema can be different [from mainstream films]; you can make what you like. What I had seen up to that point were mainly Hollywood films. What I was taught was pretty boring." Because of this particular film, he made up his mind to pursue filmmaking. "Before that, my parents and my relatives thought I would become jobless after graduation since I didn't want to do anything."

== Filmmaking career ==
In 2010, Bi made the short fiction film South, which won the first prize at the university-sponsored "Guang Sui Ying Dong" (Light Follows the Motion of Shadow) Film Festival.

Two years later in 2012, Bi made a black-and-white short film Diamond Sutra (《金刚经》; also known as The Poet and Singer), which features a story of murder in a small isolated town in the mountain. The film received Special Mention Award from the 19th Hong Kong ifva (Incubator for Film and Visual media in Asia), an award organized by Hong Kong Arts Centre, and was ranked top 10 at the 9th China Independent Film Festival in Nanjing, China.

In 2015, Bi's debut feature film, Kaili Blues, which he also wrote, brought the emerging director international recognition. The film won Best New Director and the FIPRESCI Prize at the 52nd Golden Horse Awards, Best Emerging Director at the 68th Locarno Film Festival, and the Montgolfière d'Or at the 37th Three Continents Festival in Nantes.

In 2018, Bi wrote and directed his second feature film, Long Day's Journey into Night, starring Tang Wei, Huang Jue, Sylvia Chang, and Lee Hong-chi. Set once again in Guizhou Province, the film premiered in the Un Certain Regard section at the 71st Festival de Cannes. It received five nominations at the 55th Golden Horse Awards, including Best Feature Film and Best Director for Bi, and went on to win three: Best Cinematography, Best Sound Effects, and Best Original Film Score.

== Filmography ==
=== Feature film ===
Year	English title	Original title	Notes
2011	Tiger	老虎	
2015	Kaili Blues	路边野餐	
2018	Long Day's Journey into Night	地球最后的夜晚	
2025	Resurrection	狂野时代	

=== Short film ===
Year	English title	Original title	Notes
2010	South	南方	
2012	The Poet and Singer	金刚经	
2016	Secret Goldfish	秘密金鱼	
2022	A Short Story	破碎太阳之心	

== Awards and nominations ==
Association	Year	Category	Work	Result	Ref.
Asia Pacific Screen Awards	2016	Achievement in Directing	Kaili Blues	Nominated	
Asia Pacific Screen Awards	2016	Special Mention: Young Cinema Award	Kaili Blues	Won	
Cannes Film Festival	2018	Un Certain Regard	Long Day's Journey into Night	Nominated	
Cannes Film Festival	2022	Short Film Palme d'Or	A Short Story	Nominated	
Cannes Film Festival	2025	Palme d'Or	Resurrection	Nominated	
Cannes Film Festival	2025	Special Award (Prix Spécial)	Resurrection	Won	
China Film Director's Guild Awards	2016	Young Director of the Year	Kaili Blues	Won	
Golden Horse Awards	2015	Best New Director	Kaili Blues	Won	
Golden Horse Awards	2015	FIPRESCI Prize	Kaili Blues	Won	
Golden Horse Awards	2015	Asian Cinema Observer Recommendation Award	Kaili Blues	Won	
Golden Horse Awards	2015	NETPAC Award	Kaili Blues	Nominated	
Golden Horse Awards	2018	Best Director	Long Day's Journey into Night	Nominated	
Locarno Film Festival	2015	Best Emerging Director	Kaili Blues	Won	
Locarno Film Festival	2015	Best First Feature – Special Mention	Kaili Blues	Won	
Nantes Three Continents Festival	2015	Montgolfière d’Or	Kaili Blues	Won	
Philadelphia Film Festival	2022	Honorable Mention for Best Director	A Short Story	Won	
TOKYO FILMeX	2018	Student Jury Prize	Long Day's Journey into Night	Won	

=== Honours ===
- 2026: In October 2026, Bi Gan served as a member of the Competition Jury at the 31st Busan International Film Festival.
