= Northeast Literature =

Chinese literary magazine (1945-1946)

- Several 'Northeast Literature' covers
- Editor: Li Zhengzhong
- Categories: Literature
- Frequency: Monthly
- Founded: October 1945
- First issue: December 1945
- Final issue Number: 1946; No 6
- Company: Changchun Progressive Writers Assembly
- Country: Soviet-occupied Manchuria; Republic of China
- Based in: Changchun, Manchuria
- Language: Chinese

Northeast Literature (Chinese: 东北文学, Dongbei Wenxue) was a literary journal published in Manchuria by the Changchun Progressive Writers Assembly between 1945 and 1946, following the collapse of the Manchukuo regime. The journal released six issues and included contributions from about twenty authors. Its publication ceased due to the imprisonment of its editor, Li Zhengzhong, and the impact of the ongoing Chinese Civil War.

== History ==
In October 1945, the Changchun Progressive Writers Assembly elected Li Zhengzhong as editor of a new literary journal intended to bring together writers in the region. The journal, titled Northeast Literature, published its first issue in December 1945. Li himself republished his earlier censored work and encouraged other authors to do the same. For many contributors, the journal provided a rare opportunity to publish their work in their original forms without Japanese censorship.

A total of five additional issues were published before Li Zhengzhong was arrested by Kuomintang authorities and sentenced to six months in prison in 1946 due to his activities in Manchukuo. The journal ceased publication shortly thereafter, as the escalating Chinese Civil War made continued operations increasingly untenable.

=== Notable publications ===
Li Zhengzhong’s poem Temptation was originally published in 1944, though its content was significantly altered by Japanese-led censors operating in Manchukuo. The complete, unabridged version of the poem was printed in the inaugural December 1945 issue of Northeast Literature, marking the first time the work appeared in its intended form. Other writers, such as novelist Dan Di and fairytale writer Yang Cideng, published their popular new works in the journal.

== See also ==
- Li Zhengzhong, the journal's editor
- Chinese Northeast Writers Group, a literary movement active around the same time
