= The Sheng Ching Shih Pao =

Japanese-owned Chinese newspaper

- The issue number 306 with English title
- Type: Daily newspaper
- Format: Broadsheet
- Founder: Nakajima Masao
- Founded: October 18, 1906
- Ceased publication: 1945
- Political alignment: Pro-Japan
- Language: Traditional Chinese
- Headquarters: Fengtian
- OCLC number: 648980257

The Sheng Ching Shih Pao
- Traditional Chinese: 盛京時報
- Simplified Chinese: 盛京时报
Transcriptions
Standard Mandarin
- Hanyu Pinyin: Shèngjīng Shí Bào
- Wade–Giles: Sheng4-ching1 Shih2 Pao4

The Sheng Ching Shih Pao (Chinese: 盛京時報) was a Japanese-owned Chinese newspaper established in Fengtian on October 18, 1906 by Japanese journalist named Nakajima Masao (中島真雄), after Japanese controlling of Manchuria as a result of Russo-Japanese War between 1904 and 1905. It ceased to operate at the end of Second Sino-Japanese War during the Surrender of Japan in August 1945. The newspaper received financial assistance from Japan's consulate-general in Fengtian during its early years. Some modern writers, unaware of its official English title, translated to English from its Chinese name as Shengjing Times, Shengjing Shibao, or abbreviated SJSB.

Its name Sheng Ching (盛京), a Mandarin Chinese name with meaning flourishing capital, once a capital of Manchu, then known as Mukden in English or Fungtien (奉天) prefecture, becomes present-day Shenyang. It reused this name from a Russian-owned newspaper, running from Russian invasion of Manchuria.

The newspaper was the highest circulation Chinese language daily newspaper and the most important instrument of Japanese press influence in Manchuria. It is the first Chinese-language newspaper published by the Japanese in Northeast China, and it was also Japan's longest-published newspaper in China.

With a circulation comparable to that of Far Eastern Journal, its dominance of public opinion in the Northeast China remained unchallenged after the demise of Far Eastern Journal until the closing months of the World War II.
