= Zhang Yumao =

Chinese literary scholar and politician (1935–2019)

Zhang Yumao (Chinese: 张毓茂; June 1935 – 3 February 2019) was a Chinese literary scholar and politician. He was a professor of Liaoning University known for his research on the writer Xiao Jun. He also served as vice mayor of Shenyang and vice chairman of the Liaoning Chinese People's Political Consultative Conference (CPPCC).

== Biography ==
Zhang was born in June 1935 in Gaizhou, Liaoning province.

Zhang graduated from the Department of Chinese Language and Literature of Peking University in 1960, and worked at the Institute of Latin American Studies of the Chinese Academy of Social Sciences. During the Cultural Revolution, he was sent to perform manual labour at a May Seventh Cadre School in Shenqiu County, Henan, from 1969 to 1973.

In 1973, he became a faculty member of the Department of Chinese Language of Liaoning University, serving as lecturer, associate professor, professor, and eventually department chair. He was known as the leading scholar of the Liaoning writer Xiao Jun, whom he had met in the 1950s and after the Cultural Revolution. He wrote two biographies of Xiao Jun.

Zhang joined the China Democratic League in March 1984. He entered politics in 1989, when he was appointed vice mayor of Shenyang, the capital of Liaoning. He later served as vice chairman of the Liaoning Chinese People's Political Consultative Conference (CPPCC), chairman of the China Democratic League Liaoning Provincial Committee, and vice chairman of the China Democratic League Central Committee.

Zhang retired in July 2009. He died on 3 February 2019 in Shenyang, at the age of 83.
