= Baober in Love =

Baober in Love 恋爱中的宝贝
- Film poster
- Simplified Chinese: 恋爱中的宝贝
- Directed by: Li Shaohong
- Written by: Wang Yao; Zheng Zhong
- Produced by: Li Xiaowan; Han Sanping; Xu Cui
- Starring: Zhou Xun; Huang Jue; Chen Kun
- Cinematography: Zeng Nianping
- Edited by: Qing Liu; Yann Malcor
- Music by: Pierre Bonhomme; Tetsuya Komuro; Franco Perry; Damien Vergnaud
- Production companies: Beijing Rosat Film & TV Production Co. Ltd.; Beijing Vadon Times Investment
- Release dates: 10 February 2004 (China); 12 February 2004 (Berlinale)
- Running time: 95 minutes
- Country: China
- Language: Mandarin
- Budget: CN¥42 million

Baober in Love (simplified Chinese: 恋爱中的宝贝; traditional Chinese: 戀愛中的寶貝; pinyin: Liàn'ài zhōng de Bǎobèi), also known as Baobei in Love, is a 2004 Chinese romantic thriller film directed by Li Shaohong, and starring Zhou Xun, Huang Jue, and Chen Kun. It was released in mainland China on February 10, 2004. The film had its European premiere in the Forum section of the 54th Berlin International Film Festival in February 12, 2004.

== Plot ==
Liu Zhi (Huang Jue), a young man living a depressed life from his marriage with a dominating girl, meets Baober (Zhou Xun), a seemingly ageless young girl, on a Beijing street one day. They fall in love and start to live a strange, mysterious life...

One day, Baober finds a videotape made by Liu Zhi, who thinks he has lost life's meaning. She sets out to find him and save him through love.

== Cast ==
- Zhou Xun as Baober
- Huang Jue as Liu Zi
- Liao Fan as Li Yang
- Li Xiaoran
- Chen Kun as Mao Mao
- Robert Lin

== Awards and nominations ==
Year	Award	Category	Nominated work	Result	Ref.
2004	11th Beijing Student Film Festival	Favorite Actor	Chen Kun	Won	
2004	11th Beijing Student Film Festival	Artistic Innovation Award	Baober in Love	Won	
2004	31st Ghent International Film Festival	Grand Prix	Li Shaohong	Nominated	
2005	1st China Film Director's Guild Awards	Best Actress	Zhou Xun	Won	
2005	5th Chinese Film Media Awards	Best Actress	Zhou Xun	Nominated	
2005	5th Chinese Film Media Awards	Best Director	Li Shaohong	Nominated	
2005	5th Chinese Film Media Awards	Best New Performer	Huang Jue	Nominated	
