= Shanghai International Studies University =

Public university in Shanghai, China

Coordinates: 31.277157°N 121.482911°E

- 上海外国语大学
- Other name: SHISU
- Former names: Shanghai Russian School/College (1949-1956); Shanghai Foreign Language Institute (1956-1994)
- Motto: 格高志远、学贯中外；诠释世界、成就未来
- Motto in English: Integrity, Vision, Academic Excellence; Interpret the World, Translate the Future
- Type: Public (National)
- Established: December 1949; 77 years ago
- Affiliations: United Nations MoU Universities, CIUTI, AIIC
- President: Li Yansong (李岩松)
- Faculty: 1,305
- Students: 12,395 (2021)
- Undergraduates: 6,863 (2021)
- Postgraduates: 4,568 (2021)
- Location: Shanghai, China
- Campus: Urban 74.7 hectares (Songjiang and Hongkou)
- Colors: SISU Blue
- Nicknames: SISU, or ShàngWài
- Website: global.shisu.edu.cn

Shanghai International Studies University
- Simplified Chinese: 上海外国语大学
- Traditional Chinese: 上海外國語大學
Transcriptions
Standard Mandarin
- Hanyu Pinyin: Shànghǎi Wàiguóyǔ Dàxué

Shanghai International Studies University (SHISU) is a public university in Shanghai, China. It is affiliated with the Ministry of Education, and co-funded by the Ministry of Education and the Shanghai Municipal People's Government. The university is part of Project 211 and the Double First-Class Construction.

The university was established in December 1949.

== History ==
After the founding of the People's Republic of China in 1949, the Chinese Communist Party Central Committee East China Bureau (中共中央华东局) and the government of the Shanghai Municipality decided to establish an institute for higher education in Russian studies to cultivate qualified diplomats and translators for international affairs. With the support of Mayor Chen Yi, the Shanghai Russian School (上海俄文学校) was officially established in December 1949. Jiang Chunfang, one of the most famous Russian translators in China and the first chief editor of the Encyclopedia of China, was appointed the school's first president.

In 1950, the department of English was established and the college was incorporated as the foreign language school affiliated to the East China People's Revolution University (华东人民革命大学). The department of oriental language and literature was founded in April 1951 and languages as Burmese, Vietnamese, Indonesian had respectively been introduced to teaching.

Later in 1952, a nationwide restructuring of institutes of higher education began in China, and the department of oriental language and literature was incorporated into Peking University. The college was renamed as Shanghai Russian College that specialise in teaching Russian language. The university was used to be widely known as Shanghai Foreign Language Institute (上海外国语学院) since its expansion in 1956 and became a national key university approved by the State Council in 1963 with the department of Russian, English (re-established), French, German, Japanese, Arabic and Spanish.

In 1964, Vicki Garvin became the first African American college instructor to teach in China when she began work at SFLI.

Approved by the Ministry of Education in 1994, it was officially renamed as Shanghai International Studies University (上海外国语大学). In the same year, it was listed as one of the first colleges and universities jointly supervised by the national Ministry of Education and the Municipality of Shanghai. In 1996, SISU passed the evaluation process of former Project 211 directed by the Ministry of Education, and then, SISU was included in the Double First Class University Plan designed by the Chinese central government.

== Academics ==
=== Schools and Departments ===
School	Program
School of English Studies	English
School of English Studies	Translation and Interpreting
School of Asian and African Studies	Arabic
School of Asian and African Studies	Korean
School of Asian and African Studies	Persian
School of Asian and African Studies	Vietnamese
School of Asian and African Studies	Indonesian
School of Asian and African Studies	Thai
School of Asian and African Studies	Hebrew
School of Asian and African Studies	Turkish
School of Asian and African Studies	Hindi
School of Asian and African Studies	Kiswahili
School of European and Latin American Studies	Spanish
School of European and Latin American Studies	Portuguese
School of European and Latin American Studies	Italian
School of European and Latin American Studies	Greek
School of European and Latin American Studies	Dutch
School of Japanese Studies	Japanese
School of Russian and Eurasian Studies	Russian
School of Russian and Eurasian Studies	Central and Eastern European languages (Ukrainian, Hungarian, Polish, Czech)
School of Russian and Eurasian Studies	Central Asian languages (Uzbek, Kazakh)
School of French and Francophone Studies	French
School of Germanic Studies	German
School of Germanic Studies	Swedish
School of Law	Law
School of Economics and Finance	International Economics and Trade
School of Economics and Finance	Finance
School of Economics and Finance	Accounting
School of Business and Management	Business Administration
School of Business and Management	Public Relations
School of Business and Management	Information Management and Information System
School of Business and Management	MBA Center
School of Journalism and Communication	Journalism
School of Journalism and Communication	Broadcast Journalism
School of Journalism and Communication	Advertising
School of Journalism and Communication	Educational Technology
School of Journalism and Communication	Online Journalism and New Media
School of Education	Teaching Chinese to Speakers of Other Languages
School of Education	English Education
School of Education	Business English
School of Chinese Studies and Exchange	Chinese
Graduate Institute of Interpretation and Translation (GIIT)	Translation and Interpretation
Graduate Institute of Interpretation and Translation (GIIT)	Translation Studies

=== Rankings ===
Shanghai International studies university was ranked #651-700 globally in 2016 by the QS world university rankings, the 76th in the QS BRICS 2016 and the 142nd in the QS Asian University Rankings. As of 2025, its linguistics was ranked 95th in the QS ranking by subject. Shanghai International Studies University was ranked the best in East China and second nationwide among universities specialized in language teaching and research in the widely recognized Best Chinese Universities Ranking.

=== Graduate Education ===
There are 33 Master's Programs:(30 research programs) Adult Education, Ancient Chinese Literature, Arabic Language and Literature, Asian-African Languages and Literatures, Chinese and Foreign Political Institution, Chinese Linguistics and Philology, Communication, Comparative Literature and World Literature, Corporate Management, Curriculum and Teaching Methodology, Diplomacy, Education in Ideology and Politics, Educational Technology, English Language and Literature, European Languages and Literatures, Finance, French Language and Literature, Foreign Linguistics and Applied Linguistics, German Language and Literature, International Politics, International Relations, International Trade, Japanese Language and Literature, Journalism, Linguistics and Applied Linguistics, Modern and Contemporary Chinese Literature, Russian Language and Literature, Spanish Language and Literature, Technology Economy and Management, Translation Studies; (3 taught programs) Translation and Interpreting (MTI), Business Administration (MBA), Teaching Chinese to Speakers of Other Languages (MTCSOL).

There are 12 Doctoral Programs: English Language and Literature, Russian Language and Literature, French Language and Literature, German Language and Literature, Japanese Language and Literature, Arabic Language and Literature, Asian and African Languages and Literatures, Translation Studies, International Relations, Foreign Linguistics and Applied Linguistics, International Politics, Diplomacy.

The Graduate Institute of Interpretation and Translation (GIIT) of SISU is awarded the highest ranking by AIIC, the International Association of Conference Interpreters, as the only Asian university among the 15 top professional conference interpreting schools in the world.

== Global Presence ==
The University has entered into partnerships with 286 universities and institutions in 55 countries and regions.

The Songjiang Campus of Shanghai International Studies University

=== Campus ===
SISU has two campuses, one in Hongkou District and one in Songjiang District.

==== Hongkou Campus ====
The Hongkou campus is located in the center of Shanghai, covering 16.9 hectares.

==== Songjiang Campus ====
The Songjiang campus is in Shanghai's Songjiang New District, covering an area of 53.3 hectares.

== Notable people ==
=== Notable alumni ===
- Wei Zhe - Former CEO of Alibaba
- Wang Yeping - Former First Lady of China (wife of Jiang Zemin)
- Zhang Jianmin - Consul General of the People's Republic of China in San Francisco
- Zhou Shuchun - Editor-in-chief of China Daily
- Li Jinjun - Chinese Ambassador to the Democratic People's Republic of Korea, former Vice Minister of International Liaison Department of the Chinese Communist Party
- Li Linsi - Former diplomatic consultant to Chiang Kai-shek
- Zhang Hanhui - Ambassador of China to Russia and formerly Kazakhstan
- Joan Chen - Chinese American actress, film director, screenwriter, and film producer
