= Kaili Blues =

- Film poster
- Traditional Chinese: 路邊野餐
- Simplified Chinese: 路边野餐
- Directed by: Bi Gan
- Written by: Bi Gan
- Cinematography: Tianxing Wang
- Edited by: Yanan Qin
- Music by: Lim Giong
- Release date: August 11, 2015 (Locarno)
- Running time: 113 minutes
- Country: China
- Language: Mandarin

Kaili Blues (simplified Chinese: 路边野餐; traditional Chinese: 路邊野餐, Roadside Picnic) is a 2015 Chinese mystery drama film written and directed by Bi Gan. The film follows a rural doctor's search for his nephew. The film won awards at the Locarno Festival, the 52nd Golden Horse Awards, and the Three Continents Festival in Nantes.

== Plot ==
Ex-convict Chen Sheng works as a doctor in a rural community in Kaili. He has a half-brother, Crazy Face, with whom he squabbles over the latter's neglect of his son Weiwei. Weiwei disappears one day and Chen, believing that Crazy Face has sold the child, confronts him. After being told that Weiwei was in fact taken on a trip by Chen's old mentor Monk to the neighboring Zhenyuan, he sets off to look for him. Before Chen leaves, the village's old doctor asks him to bring a few keepsakes to her old lover, a Miao musician who now lives in Zhenyuan and is on his deathbed.

On the train to Zhenyuan, Chen drifts into a dream that takes him through a mysterious village named Dangmai, in which the past, present and future mix together. He travels much of the distance on the motorbike of a young man, who eventually reveals his name to be Weiwei. He encounters a hairdresser who looks identical to his deceased wife, to whom he divulges his past: he met his future wife in a club as a young gangster. Monk lent him a hand when his wife fell sick, and he later repaid the favor by avenging Monk's son, who had his hand cut off and was buried alive over gambling debt. He spent nine years in prison as a result, during which both his mother and wife died. Before leaving Dangmai, Chen serenades the hairdresser with a song, accompanied by a traveling rock band performing there.

Arriving at Zhenyuan, Chen meets up with Monk, who tells him that he took Weiwei there when he heard that Crazy Face might sell the child, and asks Chen to let Weiwei stay with him for a few more days. Chen smiles as he sees Weiwei through a pair of binoculars. Visiting the home of the old doctor's old lover, he is informed that the musician has died. The musician's pupils play a final song to send him off.

== Production ==
Most of the cast members are local residents who were nonprofessional actors. Bi incorporated the actors' real lives when developing their characters. The lead character Chen Sheng is portrayed by Bi's uncle Chen Yongzhong, who like the character is a former gangster.

Bi primarily filmed Kaili Blues in his hometown of Kaili City. The scenes in Dangmai were shot in the nearby village of Ping Liang. The film's budget was exhausted after completing the 41-minute long take of Dangmai. To finish the film, Bi assembled a small team to shoot the rest of the film using a portable Blackmagic Pocket Cinema Camera.

Bi originally proposed the title Huang ran lu, after Portuguese author Fernando Pessoa's novel The Book of Disquiet. However, it was rejected as being too downbeat. The film's Chinese title comes from the Strugatsky brothers' novel Roadside Picnic, which Tarkovsky adapted into the 1979 film Stalker.

== Release ==
Kaili Blues premiered on August 11, 2015 at the 68th Locarno Festival. It grossed 930,549 USD total worldwide.

The film won the Best Emerging Director prize at Locarno, the Best New Film Director award at the 52nd Golden Horse Awards, and the Golden Montgolfiere Prize at the 37th Three Continents Festival in Nantes.
