= The Field of Life and Death =

1935 novel by Xiao Hong

- Cover of a 1947 edition of the novel
- Author: Xiao Hong
- Language: Chinese
- Genre: Novel
- Published: 1935
- Publication place: China

The Field of Life and Death (simplified Chinese: 生死场; traditional Chinese: 生死場; pinyin: Shēng sǐ chǎng) is a modern Chinese novel written by Xiao Hong, first published in complete form in 1935. Along with Tales of Hulan River, it is generally regarded as one of Xiao Hong's most successful works.

Set in a village near the city of Harbin, the novel examines the difficulties of peasant life during the 1920s and early 1930s, and in particular the suffering of women. The latter part of the novel also deals with life under occupation after the Japanese invasion of Manchuria.

== Plot ==
The novel has no main protagonist or plotline, being comprised instead of loosely connected scenes of village life.

The novel begins by introducing Two-and-a-half Li 二里半 and his wife, Old Mother Pockface 麻面婆, and son, Tunnel Legs 罗圈腿.

A seventeen-year-old girl from the village, Golden Bough 金枝, has been secretly having sex with twenty-year-old Ch'eng-yeh 成业. When she finds out, Golden Bough's mother is furious, having recently rejected a Ch'eng-yeh's appointed matchmaker. She becomes even more angry when Golden Bough tells her that she is pregnant.

Another villager, Chao San 赵三, has crippled a thief whom he mistook as a man from his landlord who threatened to damage his firewood in place of unpaid rent. In consequence, Chao San is jailed and forced to sell his ox to pay compensation. His son P'ing 平儿 works as a shepherd and also later helps his newly freed father sell chicken cages in the city. The chicken cage business, however, quickly fails.

Second Sister Li 李二婶 suffers a miscarriage after a long and painful labor. Her husband is unsympathetic. Old Mother Pockface and Golden Bough both, however, give birth successfully.

After her son is killed by bandits, Mother Wang 王婆 tries to commit suicide by poison. The villagers assume she will die, but she revives on the way to her burial.

Ch'eng-yeh becomes frustrated by his child's cries and threatens to sell Golden Bough and the baby. In his anger, he kills the child.

Ten years pass. The Japanese have invaded, and soldiers search the town for rebels and take away young women. Zhao San is no longer as brave as he once was, but nevertheless is roused by Li Qingshan's 李青山 anti-Japanese organizing. Two-and-a-half Li, however, remains unconcerned. Golden Bough, now widowed, goes into the city to look for work. She makes money repairing clothing but is also expected to prostitute herself to her male customers. She returns to the village.

By the end of the novel, Old Mother Pockface has been killed by the Japanese, as has her son Tunnel Legs. P'ing has narrowly escaped capture, and Li Qingshan has given up his revolutionary zeal. Linghua 菱花 and her grandmother, despairing at their situation, hang themselves.

== Critical reception ==
Cover of an English language translation of the novel

Leading critics Lu Xun and Hu Feng championed the novel, writing a preface and afterword respectively.

== Adaptations ==
=== Translations ===
An English translation by Howard Goldblatt and Ellen Yeung was published in 1979.

=== In theatre ===
A 1999 theatrical adaptation, written and directed by Tian Qinxin (田沁鑫), won a number of awards.

== Sources ==
- Dooling, Amy D. (2003). "Xiao Hong's Field of Life and Death". In Mostow, Joshua S. (ed.). The Columbia Companion to Modern East Asian Literature. New York: Columbia University Press. pp. 431–445. ISBN 0-231-11314-5.
- Ferrari, Rossella (2012). Pop Goes the Avant-Garde: Experimental theatre in contemporary China. London: Seagull. ISBN 978-0857420459.
- Idema, Wilt; Haft, Lloyd (1997). A Guide to Chinese Literature. Ann Arbor: Center for Chinese Studies, The University of Michigan. ISBN 0-89264-099-5.
- Jortay, Coraline (2022). "Reclaiming Rubbish: Feiwu at the Intersection of Gender, Class, and Disability in Xiao Hong's Market Street and Field of Life and Death | British Journal of Chinese Studies". British Journal of Chinese Studies. 12 (1). doi:10.51661/bjocs.v12i1.153. S2CID 246316784.
- Lau, Joseph S. M.; Goldblatt, Howard, eds. (1995). The Columbia Anthology of Modern Chinese Literature. New York: Columbia University Press. ISBN 0-231-08002-6.
- Tian, Qinxin (2010). 田沁鑫的戏剧本 [Tian Qinxin's Drama Script]. Beijing: Peking University Press. ISBN 978-7-301-07474-9.
- Xiao, Hong (1979). The Field of Life and Death and Tales of Hulan River. Translated by Howard Goldblatt; Ellen Yeung. Bloomington: Indiana University Press. ISBN 978-0887273926.
