= Xianfeng =

Xianfeng may refer to:

- Xianfeng Emperor (1831–1861, reigned 1850–1861), Qing dynasty emperor
- Xianfeng Motorcycle, a brand of the Chinese company Yinxiang Motorcycle

== Places in China ==
- Xianfeng County, a county in Enshi, Hubei

=== Towns ===
- Xianfeng, Chongqing, in Jiangjin District, Chongqing
- Xianfeng, Wangkui County, in Wangkui County, Heilongjiang
- Xianfeng, Urad Front Banner, in Urad Front Banner, Inner Mongolia
- Xianfeng, Yilong County, in Yilong County, Sichuan
- Xianfeng, Yunnan, in Xundian Hui and Yi Autonomous County, Yunnan

=== Townships ===
- Xianfeng Township, Gansu, in Linxia County, Gansu
- Xianfeng Township, Heilongjiang, in Yi'an County, Heilongjiang
- Xianfeng Township, Inner Mongolia, in Ar Horqin Banner, Inner Mongolia
- Xianfeng Township, Jilin, in Yushu, Jilin
- Xianfeng Township, Sichuan, in Mianning County, Sichuan

=== Subdistricts ===
- Xianfeng Subdistrict, Baoding, in Jingxiu District, Baoding, Hebei
- Xianfeng Subdistrict, Mudanjiang, in Xi'an District, Mudanjiang, Heilongjiang
- Xianfeng Subdistrict, Hengyang, in Yanfeng District, Hengyang, Hunan
- Xianfeng Subdistrict, Xiangtan, in Yuhu District, Xiangtan, Hunan
- Xianfeng Subdistrict, Bayannur, in Linhe District, Bayannur, Inner Mongolia
- Xianfeng Subdistrict, Nantong, in Tongzhou District, Nantong, Jiangsu
- Xianfeng Subdistrict, Yancheng, in Tinghu District, Yancheng, Jiangsu
- Xianfeng Subdistrict, Liaoyuan, in Xi'an District, Liaoyuan, Jilin
