= Li Zhengzhong =

Chinese author and calligrapher

- Li in 2010
- Born: 1921
- Died: February 23, 2020 (aged 98–99)
- Occupations: Author, novelist, editor, calligrapher
- Spouse: Zhang Xingjuan (1941; died 2012)
- Writing career
- Years active: 1937–1955; 1979–2020

Li Zhengzhong (Chinese: 李正中; 16 April, 1921 – February 23, 2020), sometimes known by his pen names Ke Ju and Wei Changming was an ethnic-Chinese Manchukuoan author, calligrapher, jurist, attorney, and novelist based in Manchukuo. Li was married to fellow author Zhang Xingjuan, together they were considered one of the "Northeast's four famous husband-wife writers".

== Early life in Manchukuo ==
Li Zhengzhong was born on 16 April, 1921, in Yitong County, Jilin. From a young age, his mother encouraged him to recite Tang Dynasty poetry. He attended Jilin City No.1 Middle School. At the age of sixteen he published his first collection of writings, Yu Yin guan shi cun (Yu Yin Pavilion Poems), which is considered to be a lost literary work. Some poems from the text were recovered through local newspapers published in Manchukuo. He then attended Datong University (now Utopia University) in Shanghai from 1939 to 1941, earning a law degree. Li published two more poetry collections, Native Place Yearning and Qiyue (July), both written during his time at university. By 1945, Li published four more books; Wuxian zhi sheng wuxian zhi lü (Unlimited Life, Unlimited Travel), Sun (Bamboo), Chuntian yi zhu cao (A Blade of Spring Grass), and Lu huo (Furnace Fire). A second edition of Qiyue was published in 1946. While in Manchukuo, Li worked as a judge in a Chinese court and pursued writing, editing, and calligraphy. He defended Liang Su-yung from treason charges.

== Later career ==
After World War II, Li worked as a newspaper editor for Dongbei wenxue (Northeast Literature) and Guangfu ribao (Recovery Daily). The new Communist government sentenced Li to six months in prison for his Manchukuo career. After being released he joined the People's Liberation Army and had stopped writing in 1955. During the 1950s and 1960s he worked various positions at a factory in Shenyang, including as a teacher and a labor organizer. Li was condemned as an anti-revolutionary by a court in 1969, and was exiled to rural Liaoning alongside his wife, three children, and father.

The Chinese Communist Party reversed it's ruling on writers in 1978 and Li's family returned to Shenyang the following year. Li's calligraphy was exhibitioned across China and in Canada, England, and Taiwan.

== Personal life ==
He met his future wife Zhang Xingjuan at the age of 14. The two later married in 1943 and had three children.

Li died on February 23, 2020. His final wish was to donate a total of 500 rare books and pictures to Jilin City No.1 Middle School, which was fulfilled by his family in 2021.
