= Nie Gannu =

Chinese essayist, poet and political figure

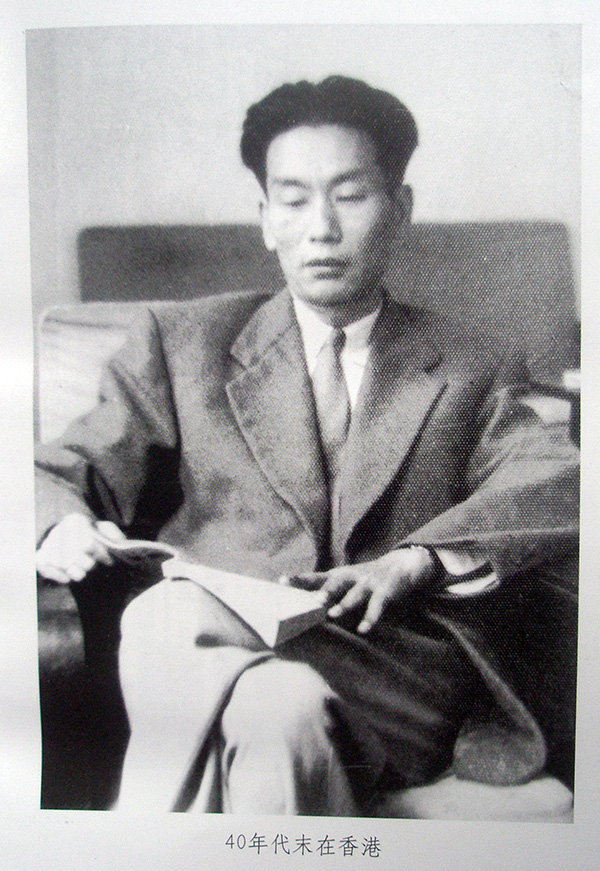
- Born: 28 January 1903; Hubei China
- Died: 26 March 1986 (aged 85); Beijing, China
- Education: Moscow Sun Yat-sen University
- Notable work: Yecao《野草》, blood《血书》, and Muttering《沉吟》
- Style: Classical style poetry

Nie Gannu (Chinese: 聂绀弩; 1903–1986) was a Chinese essayist, and a political figure. He was born in Jingshan County, Hubei province in 1903. He studied at Huangpu Military School.

After he graduated from Huangpu military School, he continued studying in Moscow Sun Yat-sen University. It is a school other famous political figures like Deng Xiaoping, JiangJingguo also attended. In 1927 he returned to China, and joined the League of Left-Wing Writers. During the Sino-Japanese War, Nie Gannu wrote Yecao《野草》. In 1958, Nie Gannu as well as other famous poets, and senior revolutionist were expelled to the Great Northern Wilderness (北大荒). It was also called a "farm", it was a labour camp in the wilderness where the Chinese government sent the revolutionist or poets who 'went against the will of the government'. They were monitored, and forced to work at. After the founding of the People's Republic of China in 1949, Nie turned to Hong Kong to run the Wen Wei Po newspaper. Later in life, he became known for his classical style poetry. He was sentenced to life in prison during the Cultural Revolution in 1966 for "acting counterrevolutionary". Then released in 1976, and had his "wrongful imprisonment" justified in 1979. He died on 26 March 1986 in Beijing.

== Early life ==
Nie Gannu was born into "a declining landowner family" in 1903. He then joined the Nationalist party in 1922. In 1924, he began studying at Huangpu Military School. He was trained as "one of the earliest cadets". After he graduated from Huangpu Military School, he studied at the Moscow Sun Yat-sen University. He met a lot of classmates and friends who were also very politically involved, and had made a huge impact on history. He met Zhou Enlai (1891–1976) at Huangpu Military School. Deng Xiaoping, who later became the leader for China, and Jiang Jingguo at Moscow Sun Yat-sen University. As well as other Chinese communists and Nationalists. In 1940s, he started working as a journal editor. In the early People's Republic China days, "We-as-one" was the main idea of the government. In 1955, Nie Gannu, Hu Feng, who also shares a similar belief Nie does, as well as other writers who were 'associated' with Hu Feng were involved in a campaign launched by Chinese Communist party. It was called the "Hu Feng event". The campaign was about "[those who mobiliize the public and assert] government control" (188 Xiao). And they were considered as the "impurities" of the community. The government believed "the impurities" were harmful to maintain the main idea of "we-as-one", therefore wanted to "get rid of them". In the Anti-rightist campaign in 1957, Nie Gannu was "labelled as a Rightist". As a result, he was excluded from the party, and forced to retire in Beijing. But In order to collect writing materials, he was sent voluntarily to the concentration camp to experience the life of Rightists. And he was sent to a concentration camp in the Great Northern Wilderness.

== Anti-Rightist Campaign punishments ==
The Chinese Communist Party decided to break the Rightists into six categories. And the punishments were as following:

	The six categories of Rightists
1	"Removed from jobs and sent to labour reeducation camp"
2	"Removed from jobs and sent to perform labour 'under supervision'"
3	"Removed from jobs and sent to perform labour with reduced salary"
4	"Keep their jobs on probation"
5	"Punished with lower rank and reduced salary"
6	"Given rightist 'caps' without other punishments"

Rightists were sent to factories, mines, countrysides, and borderlands.

== The Great Northern Wilderness ==
In 1957, the Nie Gannu was banished to the Great Northern Wilderness for reeducation through labour as he was labelled as a "Rightist", alongside of thousands other "rightists", "were accused of 'launching a ferocious offensive' on the Communist Party" (192 Yang). The Great Northern Wilderness was located in Heilongjiang, it was "the coldest and most deserted region in China" (192 Yang). Nie Gannu was sent to a concentration camp there, and he was on the "fifth team of the 850 farm". They were forced to work "from sunrise until dark, not allowing breaks even in severe weather conditions" (192 Yang). At night, they slept in a room with two long beds, where dozens of people fit in one bed. Nie Gannu, who was 55 years old at the time, was the oldest in the group, that makes it extremely hard for him to keep up with the physically challenging tasks, as well as farming tasks due to his lack of farming experiences. During his time in the Great North Wilderness, Nie Gannu wrote a lot of classical style poems about his experiences, as well as on "critiquing the Anti-Rightist and the Socialist reality" (Wang 2017).
