= Far Eastern Journal =

- Type: Daily newspaper
- Format: Broadsheet
- Founder: Alexander V. Spitsyin
- Publisher: Yuandongbao Agency
- Editor-in-chief: Alexander V. Spitsyin
- Founded: March 14, 1906
- Ceased publication: March 1, 1921
- Political alignment: Pro-Russia
- Language: Traditional Chinese
- Headquarters: Harbin
- OCLC number: 973416375

Far Eastern Journal
- Traditional Chinese: 遠東報
- Simplified Chinese: 远东报
Transcriptions
Standard Mandarin
- Hanyu Pinyin: Yuǎndōng Bào
- Wade–Giles: Yüan3-tung1 Pao4

Far Eastern Journal (Chinese: 遠東報), also known as Yuandongbao or Oriental News or Far East, was a Chinese-language newspaper distributed in Northern Manchuria and is an important primary source of Sino-Russian relations and Manchurian history in the early twentieth century. This paper, financed by the Tsarist government, managed by Russian sinologists, and written by Chinese editors, reflects the intricacies of Sino-Russian rivalry and cooperation in Northeast Asia, which neither side could have predicted.

Launched by Alexander V. Spitsyin (史弼臣) on March 14, 1906, Far Eastern Journal was the first Chinese-language newspaper published in Northern Manchuria, which became the mouthpiece of the Russian invaders to promote their "Far Eastern policy".

Far Eastern Journal was a tool for Russian propaganda and business development, but not limited to this. Its founder and editor-in-chief Alexander V. Spitsyin advocated a progressive agenda that included mutual cooperation between Russian and Chinese societies.

After the October Revolution, when the Beiyang Government of Republic of China gradually withdrew the rights to the Chinese Eastern Railway, Far Eastern Journal was ordered to stop publishing on March 1, 1921.
