= Chow Ching-Wen =

Chinese human rights activist, author and editor

Chow Ching-Wen 周鲸文 Zhōu Jīngwén

Personal details
- Born: 1908 Jinzhou, Liaoning Province, China
- Died: August 20, 1985 (aged 76–77) Hong Kong
- Relatives: Comm. Zhang Zuoxiang (uncle)
- Education: Waseda University; University of Michigan
- Known for: Co-founder of China Democratic League; author of Ten Years of Storm

Chow Ching-Wen (Chinese: 周鲸文; pinyin: Zhōu Jīngwén；1908 – August 20, 1985) was a Chinese human rights activist, author and editor. He held high-ranking positions in both the government and in the Chinese Communist Party but defected to Hong Kong in 1957. One of the founders of the China Democratic League, he is particularly known outside China for his book Ten Years Of Storm: The True Story Of The Communist Regime In China published in 1960.

== Biography ==
=== Early life ===
He was born in Jinzhou, Liaoning Province, China in 1908. Having had his secondary education, he went abroad to study first at Waseda University, Tokyo, and then the University of Michigan, Ann Arbor, Michigan, United States. His research was carried out at the University of London, England with the focus on political science.

=== London and the return to China ===
Chow began writing his first book The Theory of State in London, and had finished half the book when the Mukden Incident (or Manchurian Incident) took place in China on September 18, 1931. The Japanese invasion of China interrupted his research work, and brought him back from London to participate in the Second Sino-Japanese War.

Via Siberia, he first reached Harbin, in north east China, which had not yet been occupied by Japan. In order to arouse the patriotic feelings of people he started publishing an evening paper, Sheng Kwang Evening Post, and he made himself Editor in Chief. This was the first paper ever published in Manchuria that openly supported the Second Sino-Japanese War and thus won the sympathy of the people. It was so popular that their printing press failed to turn out enough to meet the daily demand.

Before the Japanese troops took over Harbin, the editorial opinion was so fiery that the Japanese military authorities forced Zhang Jinghui, Governor of the Special Area, to ban its publication. Zhang Jinghui later became the Prime Minister of the Manchukuo in 1935. Chow was forewarned and escaped. On the eve of the loss of Harbin, he disguised himself and slipped out of Harbin and reached Tientsin and Beijing where the Generals and leaders such as Zhang Xueliang and Zhang Zuoxiang gathered. He was actually the nephew of Zhang Zuoxiang, a top commander under Zhang Zuolin.

In 1933 when the Japanese troops marched into Rehe province, the Northeast Army decided to take a stand. In conformity with the instructions of the Nanjing Government, the Northeast army and local militia were re-organized into two armies. General Zhang Xueliang commanded the first, and General Zhang Zuoxiang the second. Chow Ching-wen joined the second army as Chief of Military Judicial department responsible for political training of the troops and mobilization of the masses. The Japanese troops gained the upper hand at the beginning of the battle. Then the Nanjing government wanted to seek compromise with the Japanese. General Zhang Xueliang was compelled to resign and to go abroad. Without any formal organization, Chow gathered some comrades to form the Northeast People's Self-Salvation Association with a weekly publication called Self Salvation in order to mobilize the masses against Japan. This was not in line with the Nanjing foreign policy. In less than half a year, some comrades were arrested and the paper was banned from circulation.

In 1935, Chow finished and published his book, The Theory of the State, which was started in London.

In 1936 General Zhang Xueliang appointed Chow as the acting President of Northeastern University (NEU) and concurrently Dean of the College of Laws. General Zhang Xueliang was at the time the Deputy Commander-in-chief of the Bandit Suppression Headquarters in Xi'an, in addition to being the President of Northeastern University. The Mukden Incident made it impossible for the university to function. The university moved to Beijing. The University Council, responsible for the general policy, was composed of members such as Dr. Hu Shih and Dr. Wang Shih-Chieh, the Minister of Education at the time.

==== First time Modern Critique (1938–1941) ====
The Second Sino-Japanese War broke out in 1937. Chow went to Hong Kong and published bi-weekly Modern Critique (Shidai piping). The theme was democracy and fighting until the defeat of Japan. In the summer of 1941, Chow promoted the human rights movement which won the support of personalities and the broad masses. Modern Critique closed when the Japanese troops occupied Hong Kong in 1941. From 1937 to 1941, Chow published the following documents:

- The Leading Position of the Chinese Nation in all National Struggles
- Studies on China's Constitutional Problems
- Democratic Struggles
- Manchuria – life line of China (in pamphlet form)

==== China Democratic League ====
In 1941, the Alliance of Chinese Democratic Political Organizations formed and consisted of three political parties and two political groups: the National Socialist Party, the Young China Party, the Third Party, the Rural Construction Group and the Vocational Education group. The National Salvation Association did not join the alliance until 1943. Chow Chin- Wen joined as a representative of the Association of Anti-Japanese Comrades. The Alliance of Chinese Democratic Parties and groups was reorganized into China Democratic League (CDL) in Chongqing in 1944. Chow was the member of the Standing Committee of the League. When the headquarter of CDL in Shanghai was dissolved by the Nationalist government in 1947, the members of the Central Committee gathered in Hong Kong. Chow helped to further the activities of the League in Hong Kong. In 1949, the headquarters transferred to Beijing. Chow also went North and assumed the following titles:

- Chairman of the Financial Committee of the Central Committee (1949–1954)
- Deputy Secretary-General of the Central Committee

==== Second Time Modern Critique (1947–1949) ====
Civil war broke out in 1947. Chow went to Hong Kong and resumed the publication of Modern Critique with an anti-civil war theme. He left Hong Kong for Beijing in March 1949 and Modern Critique closed down in June due to his absence. Between 1947 and 1949 he published the following pieces:

- China's need for a federal system
- On China's Diplomatic Relations with the United States and the Soviet Union
- The political line of the majority of the Chinese people.

The first People's Political Consultative Conference sponsored by the Chinese Communist party convened in 1949 in Beijing. He attended the conference as a representative of the League. He also attended the second People's Political Consultative Conference held in 1954 in Beijing. He was elected a member of the National Committee of the second People's Political Consultative Conference.

The People's Republic of China was founded in 1949. He was invited to be a member of the Commission of Political and Legal Affairs, an affiliate of the Ministry of the Interior. The goal of the commission was to give directions to internal affairs. The commission was abolished in 1954.

=== Years in Hong Kong ===
Chow defected to Hong Kong in December 1956 although in other sources it was quoted he defected in 1957 or 1958 during the Great Leap Forward. In late 1957 he decided to write a book entitled Ten Years of Storm which depicted his experience with the Communist government. The book was in Chinese, and later translated to English, Japanese and Korean. It received favorable reviews from numerous well known publications such as The New York Times Book Review and Far Eastern Economic Review. In the meantime, the Chinese Democratic League dismissed him in December 1957. The People's Political Consultative Conference met in March 1958 and removed his membership.

==== Third Time Modern Critique (1958–1985) ====
Chow began publishing Modern Critique for the third time in Hong Kong in 1958. In 1960 he founded the Continental Research Institute which published the Peking Informers in English semi-monthly. The Continental Research Institute employed Chinese intellectuals who were refugees and received favorable criticism from various universities, research institutions and political leaders from around the world. He was also invited to numerous countries such as United States and Japan to speak about his experience and political insights. In 1982, he published his last book, The Liberalization Movement on China Mainland, The Key to save China, Asia and the World. He died in Hong Kong on August 20, 1985. His surviving family included his wife, Mon-Ying and five children.

=== The Golden Era film ===
In 2014, The Golden Era, directed by Ann Hui, included Chow as one of the characters used to narrate the life of Xiao Hong (1911–1942), an important Chinese writer.
