= Jiang Chunfang =

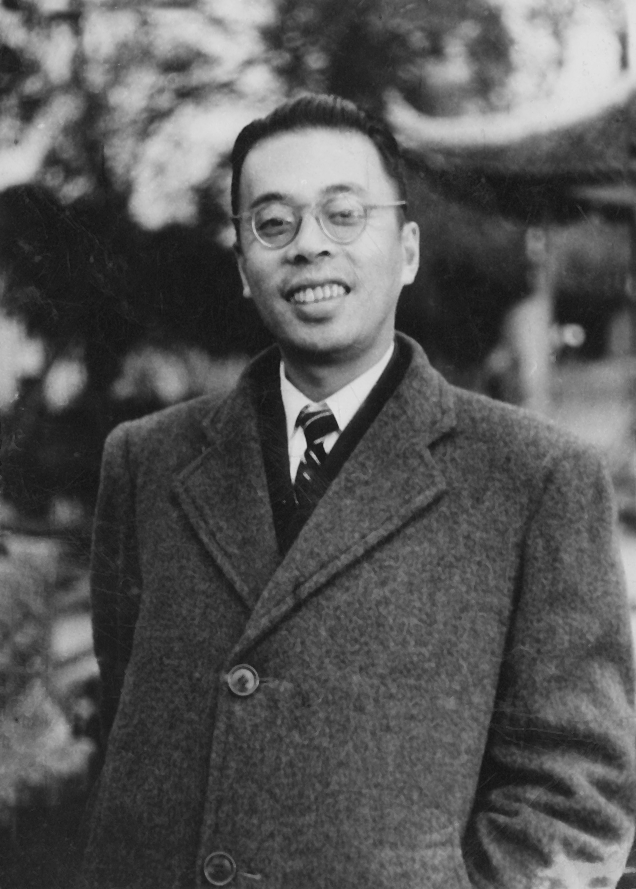
- Chinese translator, educationist, and one of the founders of the Encyclopedia of China
- Born: July 28, 1912; Wujin District, Changzhou, Jiangsu, China
- Died: December 17, 1987 (aged 75); Beijing, China
- Occupations: Writer, translator
- Relatives: Jiang Yue'an (father); Zhang Changsheng (mother)
- Writing career
- Pen name: Lin Ling (林陵); Shi Yun (什雲); Cai Yun (蔡雲)
- Language: Chinese, Russian
- Notable work: Encyclopedia of China

Chinese name
- Chinese: 姜椿芳
Transcriptions
Standard Mandarin
- Hanyu Pinyin: Jiāng Chūnfāng

Jiang Chunfang (Chinese: 姜椿芳; pinyin: Jiāng Chūnfāng, July 28, 1912 – December 17, 1987) was a Chinese translator, educationist, and one of the founders of the Encyclopedia of China. He was born in Changzhou, Jiangsu. He had a number of aliases, including Lin Ling (林陵), Shi Yun (什雲), and Cai Yun (蔡雲).

== Biography ==
Jiang joined the Communist Youth League of China in 1931, and became a member of the Communist Party the next year. He was the heads of the Propaganda Departments of the Youth League's Committees in Harbin and Manchuria. He also worked as a Russian translator at the England–Asia Telegraphic Agency (英吉利–亞細亞電報通訊社) under the appointment of Luo Dengxian.

In 1936, Jiang began working as a translator for the Asian Motion Pictures Company (亞洲影片公司) in Shanghai, which specialized in Russian films. In 1938, he became the Secretary-General of the Culture Subcommittee of the Communist Party's Shanghai Bureau (中共上海局文委文化總支部書記). In 1941, after consultations with ITAR-TASS, he started the Times Weekly (時代周刊) on behalf of the Soviet side, and acted as the editor-in-chief. Later in 1945 he would become the editor-in-chief of his newly founded Times Daily (時代日報) and the president of Times Press (時代出版社).

After the establishment of the People's Republic of China, Jiang acted as the first president of the Shanghai Russian Language School (上海俄文學校), which later became Shanghai International Studies University. His job career also included Director of Liaisons at the Shanghai Cultural Bureau, and deputy director and Consultant at the Communist Party Central Committee's Compilation and Translation Bureau of the Works of Marx, Engels, Lenin, and Stalin (中共中央馬恩列斯著作編譯局).

During the Cultural Revolution, Jiang was imprisoned at the Qincheng Prison for 7 years. He was released in 1975.

After 1978, Jiang served as vice chair of General Editorial Board of the Encyclopedia of China and the editor-in-chief of the Encyclopedia of China Press.

Jiang was the founder and president of the Chinese Translation Workers Association (中國翻譯工作者協會), which is now the Translators Association of China. He was also members of the Fifth and Sixth CPPCC Standing Committees.
