= Whampoa Military Academy purge =

1927 purge of Chinese Community Party supporters

The Whampoa Military Academy purge occurred in 1927 as part of Chiang Kai-shek's wider purge of Chinese Communist Party supporters from the ruling Kuomintang and its National Revolutionary Army.

The Kuomintang's purge of the Whampoa Military Academy cadet corps took place three days after the anti-communist massacre in Shanghai. The Whampoa students were ordered to identify fellow students as communists. The students separated out as communists were arrested and taken to the Nanshitou concentration camp.

== History ==
The Whampoa Academy purge occurred on the morning of 15 April 1927. The students were surrounded by armed troops upon reaching the academy's athletic field for morning exercise and told that they would be separated and taught different curricula if they were communists.

With the exception of one student suffering from mental problems, no students stepped forward to identify themselves as communists, but the cadet commander announced that everybody's political views were known and the students were ordered to identify the communists in their ranks. The students separated out as communists were arrested and taken to the Nanshitou concentration camp when the remaining cadets were taken to their dormitories.

Communist Party USA chairman Earl Browder visited China in 1927 with the International Workers' Delegation, a delegation composed of himself, Tom Mann, Jacques Doriot, and Sydor Stoler. Shortly after returning home, Browder published the book Civil War in Nationalist China. In section two of the first chapter, he recounts the growing divisions within the Kuomintang government and its attempts to hide them from the delegation. In particular, he recounts his visit to the Whampoa Military Academy just weeks before the purge. He writes:

Within the army, there was established at the end of 1926 a political department for the purpose of educating the soldiers in the principles of the Kuomintang, and also for carrying on mass propaganda among the population of the new territories being occupied by the nationalist armies. The workers in this political department had in the course of their work developed into quite a solid left wing, against the compromising and reactionary policies of the right wing. It was this department which arranged great mass demonstrations for us at Whampoa Political-Military Academy. It was quite evident to us that these demonstrations, at which the soldiers and cadets sang the International and shouted such slogans as "Long Live the World Revolution," were not at all to the taste of the staff officers of the army present in Canton. During our presence in Canton, however, these higher officers merely smiled and smiled and spoke fair words. But five weeks after our departure from Canton, they arrested most of the workers of the political department and blew out their brains.
