= Long Day's Journey into Night (2018 film) =

2018 film

Long Day's Journey into Night (Note: simplified Chinese: 地球最后的夜晚; traditional Chinese: 地球最後的夜晚; pinyin: Dìqiú Zuìhòu de Yèwǎn; French: Un grand voyage vers la nuit)
- US theatrical release poster
- Chinese: 地球最後的夜晚
- Hanyu Pinyin: Dìqiú zuìhòu de yèwǎn
- Directed by: Bi Gan
- Written by: Bi Gan
- Produced by: Shan Zuolong
- Starring: Tang Wei; Huang Jue; Sylvia Chang; Lee Hong-chi; Chen Yongzhong
- Cinematography: Yao Hung-i; Dong Jinsong; David Chizallet
- Edited by: Qin Yanan
- Music by: Lim Giong; Hsu Point
- Production companies: Zhejiang Huace Film & TV; Dangmai Films; Huace Pictures
- Distributed by: BAC Films (France)
- Release dates: 15 May 2018 (Cannes); 31 December 2018 (China); 30 January 2019 (France)
- Running time: 138 minutes
- Countries: China; France
- Language: Mandarin
- Box office: $42.1 million

Long Day's Journey into Night (Chinese: 地球最後的夜晚; pinyin: Dìqiú Zuìhòu de Yèwǎn; lit. 'Last evenings on Earth') is a 2018 Chinese drama film written and directed by Bi Gan. Despite the film's English-language title, it is unrelated to the 1956 Eugene O'Neill play of the same name.

The film premiered at the Un Certain Regard section of the 2018 Cannes Film Festival. It is notable for its final 59 minutes, which consists of one unbroken long take in 3D.

== Plot ==
In the opening scene, Luo Hongwu remarks to a prostitute that he is haunted by the memory of a woman who disappeared. The story of his involvement with the woman is then told in a chiefly non-linear fashion.

Luo grew up in Kaili with his friend Wildcat. Wildcat was to sell a cart of apples to the gangster Zuo Hongyuan and enlisted Luo's help, but Luo missed the delivery and Wildcat was later murdered by Zuo. Luo eventually discovered the apple sale was a means to smuggle a gun.

Luo attempts to track down Zuo through his girlfriend Wan Qiwen. Wan had been a cat burglar and had broken into a home with another woman, but they were distracted by a green book with a poetry spell that could supposedly make the house itself spin. The inhabitants returned unexpectedly, causing them to flee with the most valuable item they could grab; the only thing Wan took was the book. Luo finds her on a train, and their initially brutal meeting turns into passion. The green book enters his possession when she leaves it on a wall. When Zuo returns to town, Wan convinces Luo to murder him in a movie theatre by shooting him through the back of his seat. She disappears afterwards; Luo is able to retrace some of her steps but fails to find her.

Years later, Luo returns to Kaili for his father's funeral. A picture in the clock that used to hang in his father's restaurant has a phone number written on the back, which leads him to Wan's former accomplice, now in prison. She explains the story of the house to him and says that if he has the green book, he must have been very special to her.

Luo's travels take him to a rundown town where he sees Wan's name on a faded poster next to a strip joint. A sex worker fails to solicit him, before advising him to wait at the movie theatre until the strip club opens. As the feature at the theatre begins, the audience puts on their 3D glasses, signaling the real-life audience to do the same, leading to a final continuous 59-minute sequence in 3D. Whether the scene represents a dream or reality is left ambiguous.

Luo finds himself on a railway track in an abandoned mine, which he claims he arrived at by following a path out of the theatre. He reaches a small office, where a boy challenges him to a game of ping-pong. Luo easily bests the boy, and the boy gives him his paddle in appreciation, which he says enables one to fly, and agrees to take him out of the mine on a scooter. Luo then takes a chairlift down to a pool hall in a mountain village, run by a red-jacketed proprietress, Kaizhen, who resembles Wan. The two spin the paddle and it flies them to the village square, where a traveling karaoke show plays. Luo sees a woman who resembles Wildcat's mother, her hair dyed a brilliant red, and forces her faithless lover to take her back. Luo and Kaizhen then light a sparkler before leaving to find a burned-down home. He reads out a poem and kisses her as the room spins around them. The sparkler is still burning where they left it.

== Cast ==
- Tang Wei as Wan Qiwen / Kaizhen
- Huang Jue as Luo Hongwu
- Sylvia Chang as Wildcat's mother / red-haired woman
- Lee Hong-chi as Wildcat
- Chen Yongzhong as Zuo Hongyuan
- Chloe Maayan as Pager
- Duan Chun-hao as Ex-husband
- Ming Dao as Traffic Police

== Production ==
Director Bi Gan enlisted novelist Chang Ta-Chun as a consultant for the script, noting that Ta-Chun aided in the overall film structure as well as the division of the film into two parts. Of the two parts, Bi noted that "the title of the first part is Memory; that of the second is Poppy, in reference to Paul Celan's poem Poppy and Memory. At some point, I even considered using this as the film's title."

Bi stated that "I liked the idea that the first half would be in 2D, because I wanted it to feel as fragmented as time, with little bits of memory ... With the second half, I wanted it to be real-time, and the 3D was the best way to create a spatial experience for that." The 59-minute unbroken long take 3D sequence that closes the film took two months to prepare, as techniques had to be devised to move a RED camera through the complicated environment of the scene. It took seven attempts at shooting the sequence before Bi was satisfied. The sequence was shot in 2D and converted to 3D in post-production because a 2D camera was lighter and therefore easier to move in difficult positions and small environments.

In reference to the use of 2D and 3D, Bi said:

It's a film about memory. After the first part (in 2D), I wanted the film to take on a different texture. In fact, for me, 3D is simply a texture. Like a mirror that turns our memories into tactile sensations. It's just a three-dimensional representation of space. But I believe this three-dimensional feeling recalls that of our recollections of the past. Much more than 2D, anyway. 3D images are fake but they resemble our memories much more closely.

The film is notable for utilizing three cinematographers: Yao Hung-I, Dong Jinsong, and David Chizallet. Their individual roles were broken down by Bi, who stated that "Yao Hung-I began shooting the first part. We worked together for several months and then he went back to Taiwan. Dong Jinsong then took over for half of the part in 2D and the preparation of the final sequence shot that David Chizallet eventually shot. Chizallet also shot one scene of the part in 2D."

Bi stated that he had difficulty choosing a title for the film, noting that the official international title is "Long Day's Journey into Night", a title inspired by the play of the same name by Eugene O'Neill, whereas the direct Chinese translation is "Last Evenings on Earth", which refers to a short story written by Chilean author Roberto Bolaño. Regarding the two titles, Bi noted that he wanted to choose titles that "matched with the film's spirit" and that he ultimately chose them because they related to two works of literature he admired.

Bi drew inspiration for the film from the paintings of Marc Chagall, specifically The Promenade, as well as the novels of Patrick Modiano.

== Reception ==
=== Box office ===
Despite its unusual story structure, the film was marketed and distributed in China as a romantic event film, and an ideal date movie for its New Year's Eve release. It also received a wide theatrical release. The strategy worked; by 25 December, the film had already sold 100 million yuan ($15 million US dollars) in presales tickets. Despite its strong presales, it faded quickly from the box-office charts, having grossed $41 million US during its initial three weeks (most of it from its 31 December premier).

In China, its massive early box office success led to a backlash; the hashtag "can't understand Long Day's Journey Into Night" trended on social media, and users of the ticketing platform Maoyan drove its aggregate user rating down.

=== Critical response ===
The review aggregation website Rotten Tomatoes reported a 93% approval rating based on 92 reviews, with an average score of 7.9/10. The website's critical consensus reads, "Long Day's Journey Into Night may flummox viewers looking for an easy-to-follow story, but writer-director Gan Bi's strong visual command and technical risk-taking pay off." Metacritic, which uses a weighted average, assigned a score of 88 out of 100 based on 23 critics, indicating "universal acclaim". The film's final 3D sequence, in particular, drew substantial praise at its 2018 Cannes Film Festival debut.

Many critics praised the final, hour-long dream sequence which was filmed in one continuous take. In his 4/4 star review for The Boston Globe, critic Ty Burr compared the sequence to his own dreams, noting that they are often "unsettling, unstoppable, and yet there's often a logic within their illogic. This is precisely what Bi has re-created in the final hour of "Long Day's Journey Into Night", a fluid and outrageously extended camera shot that, as with dreams, doesn't need editing to cast its spell." Peter Bradshaw lauded the dream sequence as "a kind of slo-mo exhilaration" in his 5/5 star review for The Guardian. He proceeded to reflect on how the unbroken dream sequence allows the viewer to think about memories not as simple, disconnected flashbacks, but rather as complex, subliminal flashes which lack any significant substance until one is created for them. When viewed in this light, he states that "memory becomes a creative act, a developmental fleshing-out of a fleeting glimpse or feeling."

=== Awards and nominations ===
Year	Award	Category	Recipient(s)	Result	Ref.
2018	55th Golden Horse Awards	Best Feature Film	Long Day's Journey into Night	Nominated	
2018	55th Golden Horse Awards	Best Director	Bi Gan	Nominated	
2018	55th Golden Horse Awards	Best Cinematography	Yao Hung-i; Dong Jinsong; David Chizallet	Won	
2018	55th Golden Horse Awards	Best Original Film Score	Lim Giong; Point Hsu	Won	
2018	55th Golden Horse Awards	Best Sound Effects	Li Danfeng; Si Zhonglin	Won	
