= Huang Jue =

Chinese actor (born 1974)

- Born: 7 August 1974 (age 52); Nanning, Guangxi, China
- Education: Guangxi Arts Institute
- Occupations: Actor; model
- Years active: 2003–present
- Height: 182 cm (6 ft 0 in)

Chinese name
- Traditional Chinese: 黃覺
- Simplified Chinese: 黄觉
Transcriptions
Standard Mandarin
- Hanyu Pinyin: Huáng Jué

Vietnamese name
- Vietnamese: Hoàng Giác

Huang Jue (Chinese: 黄觉, born 7 August 1974) is a Chinese actor. He gained fame for his roles in Baobei in Love (2004), Falling Flowers (2012), and Fallen City (2013). In 2018, Jue had also starred in the films Long Day's Journey into Night, which was screened in the Un Certain Regard section at the 2018 Cannes Film Festival.

== Filmography ==
=== Film ===
Year	English title	Chinese title	Role	Notes
2003	The Floating Landscape	戀之風景	Xiaowu	
2004	Baobei in Love	恋爱中的宝贝	Liu Zhi	
2004	Letter from an Unknown Woman	一个陌生女人的来信	An army officer	
2005	Everlasting Regret	长恨歌	"Old Colour"	
2006	A Friend From Ocean	海洋朋友		
2007	Air Diary	飞行日志	A Xing	
2007	The Door	门	Hongyuan	
2009	Wheat	麦田	Xia	
2011	The Founding of a Party	建黨偉業	Li Da	
2012	Falling Flowers	萧红	Xiao Jun	
2013	Better and Better	越来越好之村晚	Xiang Cheng	
2013	Fallen City	倾城	Liu Chuan	
2014	Fleet of Time	匆匆那年		Guest
2015	A Tale of Three Cities	三城記	Master Zhou	
2015	The Final Master	師父	Lin Xiwen	
2016	Kill Time	谋杀似水年华	Leader Wang	
2017	Only the Wind Knows	那一場呼嘯而過的青春	Léiguǎn	
2017	The Hidden Sword	刀背藏身	Imposter of Shen Feixue	
2017	Ash	追·蹤	Du Guojin	
2017	The Lady in the Portrait	画框里的女人		
2018	Long Day's Journey into Night	地球最後的夜晚	Luo Hongwu	
2018	Savage	雪暴	Criminal #2	
2018	A City Called Macau	媽閣是座城	Shi Qiwei	
2019	Better Days	少年的你	Old Yang	
2019		被光抓走的人		
2025	Resurrection	狂野时代		
TBA		兔子暴力		
TBA		陰陽師		

=== Television series ===
Year	English title	Chinese title	Role	Notes/Ref.
2003		名揚花鼓	Zhu Xi	
2003		買辦之家	Xiao Jing	
2003		街燈	Yu Peng	
2004	Assassinator Jing Ke	荊軻傳奇	General Hao Yue	
2004		風吹雲動星不動	Qiche	
2005		长剑相思	Qin Zhao	
2005		一针见血	Liu Changjiang	
2005		像风一样离去	Xu Tianlei	
2006		后天美女	Wei Zhenguo	
2006		我爱你，再见	Xia Chengnan	
2007		甜蜜的烦恼	Wang Jian	
2007		丁家有女喜洋洋	Yang Wenjing	
2007		风月·恶之花	Yuan Xiaoyun	
2008		破繭而出	Yan Renwei	
2009	Love in a Fallen City	傾城之戀	Fan Liuyuan	
2009		爱盛开	Daofeng	
2010		嫦娥	Hou Yi	
2010	Detective Tanglang	唐琅探案	Xie Tianhong	
2010		隐形将军	Liancheng	
2011	Blacklist	黑色名单	Huang Longjie	
2011		再回首	Ma Zhimin	
2011		曾经与你有个梦	Li Deliang	
2012		夜隼	Tang Wei	
2012		風雨唐人街	Zeng Xi	
2012		苍天圣土	Yi Junshu	
2012	Half a Fairy Tale	童話二分之一	Li Rui	Guest
2013		生死钟声	Xie Yunting	
2013		天底良知	Zeng Guangnian	
2013	Love is not for Sale	棋逢对手	Scorpion	
2014		金戰	Chen Zizheng	
2014	Legendary Heroes	英雄祭 ( 英雄祭之生死上海滩)	Zhao Xinjiu	
2014	City of Fantasy	奇妙世纪	Zhang Wen	
2014		大水井风云	Qi Keyuan	
2014		誰解女人心		
2015		好想好想愛上你	Takano	
2015	Wonder Lady	極品女士第四季		Guest
2016	I'm Your Eyes	我是你的眼	Chen Shi	
2016	Forever Love	愛情萬萬歲	Wu Suowei	
2017	Tracks In The Snow Forest	林海雪原	Guan Yizhong	
2017	We Are Family	幸福有配方	Chai Haiqing	
2018	The Road of Light	诚忠堂	Joe Ying	
2020	Imperfect Love	不完美的她	Tian Fang	
2023	Blossoms Shanghai	繁花	Mr Qiang	
2022	Reset	开端	Wang Xingde	
2024	Like a Flowing River 3	大江大河之岁月如歌	Wang Chiheng	
2024	Ode to Joy 5	欢乐颂5	Mr. Li	
2024	Regeneration	新生	Cheng Hao	
2025	Unbreakable II	无所畏惧2	Xu Zhuo	
2025	Into The Heat	刑警的日子	Tang Lin	
2025		藏海传	Zhuang Luyin	
TBA		親愛的老闆	Pi Chenglong	
TBA		从爱情到幸福	Zhu Tiesi	
TBA		修仙记之何仙姑传	Zhang Guolao	
TBA	Ancient Love Poetry	千古玦尘	Sen Jian	
TBA	Minning Town	闽宁镇	Ling Yinong	

== Awards and nominations ==
Year	Award	Category	Nominated work	Result	Ref.
2005	5th Chinese Film Media Awards	Best New Performer	Baober in Love	Nominated	
2013	29th Golden Rooster Awards	Best Actor	Fallen City	Nominated	
2013	Beijing Student Film Festival	Best Actor	Falling Flowers	Nominated	
2014	China Film Director's Guild Awards	Best Actor	Falling Flowers	Nominated	
