= The Columbia Anthology of Modern Chinese Literature =

1995 anthology edited by Joseph S. M. Lau and Howard Goldblatt

The Columbia Anthology of Modern Chinese Literature is a 1995 anthology of Chinese literature edited by Joseph S. M. Lau and Howard Goldblatt and published by Columbia University. Its intended use is to be a textbook.

This anthology includes works from Mainland China, Taiwan, and Hong Kong, and also Chinese-speaking authors of other places, originally published in Chinese between 1918 and 1992. The works include poetry, essays, and fiction, with most fiction being short stories. Novels and drama pieces were too long, and therefore were not included. These works would be classified by Chinese literary critics as being dangdai (contemporary) and xiandai (modern). Some of the works had already been translated prior to the publication of this book, while other translations were newly published.

Martin W. Huang of the University of California, Irvine wrote that despite the omission of drama and novels, this was the first single book in which one is "able to read in English some of the most representative works in major genres written by modern Chinese writers and enjoy a relatively complete picture".

The anthology presents accompanying biographies of poets and writers before presenting the actual works. Bonnie S. McDougall of The China Quarterly stated that in the original edition of the book's introduction and biographies, there is incorrect information, "especially dates," present in the factual material, but that "it must be stressed" that the errors in the factual information "are few in number."

== Contents ==
The anthology divides its works into fiction, poetry, and essays, and within each division sub-divides the works into 1918–1949, 1949–1976, and "since 1976" time periods. The works made in 1918-1949 focus on Mainland China, while those from 1949 to 1976 focus on Taiwan. The sole works from 1949 to 1976 produced in Mainland China were two poems written by Mu Dan. Works from 1976 onwards include Mainland, Taiwan, and Hong Kong works. The works of 21 authors, including 12 from Mainland China, are in this part. The book devotes more space to fiction than it does to essays and poetry. The book has the works of nine poets in the pre-World War II era, and it includes works of twelve Taiwanese poets published in a period of 27 years.

In regards to works in the pre-1949 period, the book contains essays including those from Lin Yutang and Zhou Zuoren, poetry including that from Ai Qing and Xu Zhimo, and stories including those from Ba Jin and Lu Xun.

Tatiana Fisac of the Autonomous University of Madrid argued that the book uses the Taiwanese authors of 1949-1976 "as the truly significant contributors to the Chinese literary canon during that time" and ""alternative worlds" to the asphyxiating political atmosphere for creative writing that prevailed during the Maoist era on the mainland, when the subordination of literature to official politics was enforced." Huang argues that even though the authors from 1949-1976 were mainly in Taiwan, the time period 1949-1976 was relevant to the Mainland and not Taiwan, and he argued that the exclusion of the Mainland works "only adds to the inadequacy of their overall "historical scheme"". He also stated that not including Communist literature during the 1949-1976 period results in "a disruption in the anthology's implied historical presentation, and therefore, undermines to a degree its comprehensiveness" and that this is the case "[e]ven if one agrees with the editors that the literature produced in China during this period generally lacks genuine literary appeal". McDougall argued that by omitting almost all Mainland authors from 1949 to 1976, "readers are deprived of flawed but nevertheless compelling examples of political fiction struggling to make sense of drastic social change."

Genres of post-1976 works include xianfeng (avant garde) works, works by women, and "misty" (menglong) poetry. Works in the first category include those of Can Xue and Yu Hua. Those in the second include those of Li Ang, Tie Ning, and Xi Xi. Those in the third category include Bei Dao and Shu Ting.

== Reception ==
Fisac wrote that "No doubt, the authority of this volume relies to a large extent on the distinguished previous work done by Professors Lau and Goldblatt, and on the work of the many other good translators who are represented here." She also stated that she would have wanted to see a list of original references in order to check accuracies of translations an appendix listing the names of authors and original Chinese titles in order to aid translation studies.

Huang concluded that the book "will be indispensable to any student of Chinese literature" and he believed it would "become a very popular textbook for classes on modern China and modern Chinese literature for many years to come." Huang stated that he wished that there would be "relevant bibliographical information" since the work's intended use is that of a textbook.

McDougall argued that the book was "a very worthwhile endeavour"; she congratulated the authors and press and stated that "We should all welcome the appearance of this anthology, and if we have ourselves an alternative vision of what constitutes Chinese literature this century it is up to us to compile and publish our own anthologies."

Philip F. Williams of the University of Arizona praised how the book collected multiple translations into a single book, and how they were of a "high" quality of translation.
