= Xiao Hong =

Chinese writer (1911–1942)

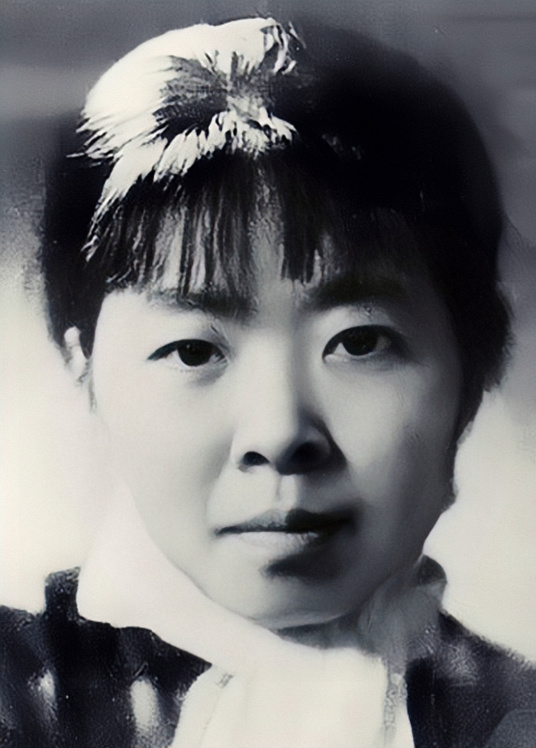
- Portrait of Xiao Hong
- Born: Zhang Xiuhuan (later changed to Zhang Naiying); 1 June 1911; Hulan Prefecture, Heilongjiang, Qing Empire
- Died: 22 January 1942 (aged 30); St. Stephen's Girls' College, Japanese Hong Kong
- Resting place: Galaxy Revolutionary Cemetery, Guangzhou, China
- Education: High school
- Occupations: Novelist, essayist, poet
- Spouse: Duanmu Hongliang (m. 1938)
- Partner(s): Wang Enjia; Xiao Jun
- Children: 2 (both died in infancy or given away)
- Parent(s): Zhang Tingju (father); Jiang Yulan (mother)
- Writing career
- Pen name: Qiao Yin, Tian Di, Lingling
- Period: 1933–1942
- Genres: Fiction, prose, poetry
- Subjects: Rural life, feminism, war
- Notable works: Tales of Hulan River; The Field of Life and Death
- Movements: July faction, Modern Chinese Literature

Xiao Hong
- Traditional Chinese: 蕭紅
- Simplified Chinese: 萧红
Transcriptions
Standard Mandarin
- Hanyu Pinyin: Xiāo Hóng
- Wade–Giles: Hsiao Hung

Xiao Hong (1 June 1911 – 22 January 1942), born Zhang Naiying and formerly known as Zhang Xiuhuan, was a prominent Chinese novelist, essayist, and poet of the Republican era. Hailing from Hulan, Heilongjiang, she is widely celebrated as one of the most significant female writers in modern Chinese literature, often referred to by critics as the "Goddess of Literature" of the 1930s.

Her literary output, characterized by a profound compassion for the marginalized and a unique blend of tragic and lyrical prose, includes masterpieces such as Tales of Hulan River and The Field of Life and Death. Her life was marked by relentless wandering, rebellious defiance against patriarchal constraints, and tragic romances, ultimately ending in her premature death in wartime Hong Kong at the age of 30.

== Early life and education ==
Xiao Hong was born on the fifth day of the fifth lunar month in 1911 (the day of the Dragon Boat Festival) into a wealthy landlord family in Hulan Prefecture, Heilongjiang. Her childhood name was Zhang Ronghua, and her formal school name was Zhang Xiuhuan. In 1916, her grandfather, Jiang Wenxuan, changed her name to Zhang Naiying. Her mother, Jiang Yulan, died in 1919.

She began her education in 1920 at the girls' class of the Hulan County Type-B Agricultural School. In 1924, she advanced to the Beiguan Primary and Secondary School, and in 1925, transferred to the Hulan County First Girls' School. During the May Thirtieth Movement in 1925, she actively participated in student union demonstrations, fundraising, and speeches, and acted as a destitute girl in a local charity play, Proud Frost Branch.

In 1926, after graduating from primary school, her desire to attend middle school in Harbin was fiercely opposed by her father, Zhang Tingju, and her stepmother, Liang Yalan. After a period of intense family struggle, she enrolled in the First Girls' Middle School of the Special Administrative Region of the Eastern Provinces in 1927. On 9 November 1928, she joined the anti-Japanese railway protection protests in Harbin (known as the "11-9 Movement"), serving as a volunteer propagandist.

== Arranged marriage and rebellion ==
In early 1929, her father arranged her betrothal to Wang Enjia, a young man from a family in Harbin's Guxiang屯 (Guxiangtun). Following her grandfather's death in June 1929, Xiao Hong discovered that Wang was vulgar and an opium addict, prompting her desire to annul the engagement. In November 1929, during the Sino-Soviet conflict, she participated in charity events for the war effort.

In the summer of 1930, she graduated from middle school and fled to Beiping (now Beijing) to escape the arranged marriage. She enrolled in the high school attached to the Women's Normal College of Beiping University. There, she cohabited with her married cousin, Lu Zhesun. Her family was furious and pressured Lu's family, who cut off his financial support; by winter, Lu capitulated to his family, leaving Xiao Hong stranded.

In early 1931, she returned to Hulan, was briefly placed under house arrest, and later reconciled with her family. She returned to Beiping in February, but Wang Enjia tracked her down. By April, she was confined by her stepmother in Acheng for six months. On 3 October, she escaped, taking a train back to Harbin. Homeless and impoverished, she briefly reconnected with Wang Enjia. In December, she moved into the dormitory of her cousin at the Second Girls' Middle School. Upon discovering she was pregnant, she abruptly left and moved into the Dongxing Shun Hotel with Wang Enjia.

== Relationship with Xiao Jun and literary debut ==
Following the Mukden Incident, Japanese forces occupied Harbin on 5 February 1932. In May, Wang Enjia left the hotel and was detained by his family. His brother, Wang Dacheng, attempted to annul the engagement on Wang's behalf. Xiao Hong sued Wang Dacheng for "divorcing his brother's wife on his behalf," but Wang Enjia testified in his brother's favor, and Xiao Hong lost the case. By June, unable to pay her bills, she was held hostage by the hotel owner, facing the threat of being sold to a brothel.

On 9 July, she wrote a desperate letter to Pei Xinyuan, editor of the literary supplement of the International Herald (Harbin). Pei sent Xiao Jun (real name Liu Honglin) to investigate. The two instantly felt a deep intellectual and romantic connection. On 7 August, the Songhua River flooded Harbin. On 9 August, Xiao Hong escaped the hotel on a rescue boat. In late August, she gave birth to a daughter in a Harbin hospital and gave the child up for adoption. In September, she and Xiao Jun moved into the Europa Hotel, and later to a small room on Shangshi Street (Market Street).

Encouraged by Xiao Jun, Xiao Hong began her literary career in early 1933, publishing her first prose piece, Abandoned Child. In October 1933, the couple self-published their first joint collection of stories and essays, Bashe (Trudging), which attracted the attention of the literary scene in Manchukuo. However, the book was banned by the Manchukuo government in December for its "anti-Manchurian and anti-Japanese" tendencies.

== Move to Qingdao and Shanghai, and meeting Lu Xun ==
In June 1934, Xiao Hong and Xiao Jun moved to Qingdao, residing at No. 1 Guanxiang Yi Road. It was here in September that she completed the manuscript of her novel The Field of Life and Death (originally titled Wheat Field). Following the arrest of their friend Shu Qun and the closure of the Qingdao Morning Post, the couple left for Shanghai on 1 November 1934.

In Shanghai, they settled in the French Concession. Xiao Hong wrote to the renowned writer Lu Xun, who responded warmly. On 30 November, the couple met Lu Xun and his family at a café near the Uchiyama Bookstore. Under Lu Xun's patronage, Xiao Hong's The Field of Life and Death was published in December 1935 as part of the "Slave Series" (Nuli congshu). Lu Xun praised her "meticulous observations and transgressive brushstrokes." This publication catapulted her to fame, securing her place in modern Chinese literary history.

== Sojourn in Japan ==
In July 1936, seeking respite from the emotional turmoil caused by Xiao Jun's infidelity, Xiao Hong traveled to Tokyo, Japan. She enrolled in an East Asian补习 school to study Japanese. On 19 October, Lu Xun died. Devastated by the news, she channeled her grief into her writing, producing the prose piece A Lonely Life, the poetry collection Sand Grains, and the short story collection On the Ox Cart. She returned to Shanghai in January 1937.

== Wartime wandering and relationship with Duanmu Hongliang ==
Following the outbreak of the Second Sino-Japanese War in 1937, Xiao Hong and Xiao Jun moved to Hankou (now part of Wuhan). Here, she met Duanmu Hongliang, a writer who would become her second and final partner. In early 1938, the couple traveled to Linfen, Shanxi, to teach at the National Revolutionary University. As Japanese forces advanced, Xiao Jun chose to stay behind for guerrilla warfare, while Xiao Hong left with the Northwest War Service Troupe, effectively ending their six-year relationship.

In March 1938, Xiao Hong arrived in Xi'an and discovered she was pregnant with Duanmu Hongliang's child, but failed to find a doctor to perform an abortion. In April, she formally ended her relationship with Xiao Jun and confirmed her romance with Duanmu. They married in Hankou in May 1938.

As the war intensified, Xiao Hong fled to Chongqing. In November 1938, she gave birth to a premature baby boy in a private clinic in Jiangjin. The infant died of convulsions a few days later. In 1939, she and Duanmu settled in Jiangjin, where she organized her memoirs of Lu Xun. Exhausted by the relentless Japanese bombing of Chongqing and in declining health, they decided to relocate to Hong Kong in late 1939.

== Final years in Hong Kong and death ==
Xiao Hong and Duanmu Hongliang arrived in Hong Kong in January 1940. Despite her deteriorating health, she remained highly productive. In September 1940, her masterpiece, Tales of Hulan River, began serialization in the Sing Tao Daily. Completed in December, the novel is a poignant, semi-autobiographical depiction of her hometown. In 1941, she published the satirical novel Ma Bole and the short story Early Winter in a Small Town.

In July 1941, her health severely declined. Following the outbreak of the Pacific War and the Japanese invasion of Hong Kong on 8 December 1941, she was trapped in the city. In late December, she was admitted to the Hong Kong Sanatorium & Hospital, where she was misdiagnosed and subjected to an unnecessary tracheotomy, leaving her unable to speak. On 18 January 1942, she was transferred to the Marie Hospital.

On the night of 19 January, unable to speak, she wrote her final, heartbreaking words on a piece of paper: *"I will forever dwell with the blue sky and green waters... leaving the unfinished 'Dream of the Red Chamber' for others to write... My half-life has been filled with cold stares and neglect. I die first, unwilling, unwilling!"* On 22 January 1942, as Japanese forces took over the hospital, she was moved to a temporary medical station at St. Stephen's Girls' College, where she died, aged 30.

Composed at Xiao Hong's Graveside

Walking six lonely hours on a long road,
I place a bouquet of red camellias by your head.
I wait,
Through the endless night,
While you lie listening to the idle chatter of the tides.

— Dai Wangshu

== Literary works ==
Xiao Hong approached the human condition with a profound and expansive compassion, creating works of immense spiritual resonance. Her writing is characterized by a unique blend of tragedy and dark humor, a robust yet tender linguistic style, and an unconventional narrative structure that defied the traditional realism of her contemporaries.

Her breakthrough novel, The Field of Life and Death, depicts the brutal realities of rural life in Northeast China before and after the Mukden Incident. Lu Xun praised it for capturing "the tenacity of the northern people in facing life, and their struggle in the face of death." While some scholars interpret the novel as a "national allegory" driven by patriotism, others, such as Lydia He Liu, emphasize its focus on the visceral experiences of rural women—particularly the cycles of生育 (reproduction) and death—arguing that the novel critiques patriarchy and highlights how nationalistic归属感 (sense of belonging) primarily serves male interests.

Xiao's 1934 essay The Park uses the imagery of the woman vampire to parody the trend among male writers at the time who expressed their dismay about lipstick wearing, "blood drinking," modern women.

Her magnum opus, Tales of Hulan River, presents a unique challenge to literary historians due to its unprecedented weaving of personal memory with regional history. The eminent critic C. T. Hsia (Xia Zhiqing) later confessed that omitting Xiao Hong from his seminal A History of Modern Chinese Fiction was "the most unforgivable oversight," praising the novel for its "heightened sense of authenticity" and ranking her among the finest Chinese writers of the 20th century.

=== Major works ===
==== Books and Collections ====
- Bashe (Trudging, 1933) – Co-published with Xiao Jun.
- The Field of Life and Death (Shengsi chang, 1935)
- Shangshijie (Market Street, 1936) – Prose sketches.
- Tales of Hulan River (Hulanhe zhuan, 1940)
- Ma Bole (Ma Bole, 1941) – Satirical novel.

==== Selected works in English translation ====
- The Field of Life and Death & Tales of Hulan River, translated by Howard Goldblatt, Indiana University Press, 1979. ISBN 0-253-15821-4
- The Dyer's Daughter: Selected Stories of Xiao Hong, translated by Howard Goldblatt, Chinese University Press, 2005. ISBN 978-962-996-014-8
- Vague Expectations: Xiao Hong Miscellany, Research Centre for Translation, Hong Kong, 2020. ISBN 978-962-7255-47-5

== Family ==
- Father: Zhang Tingju
- Mother: Jiang Yulan
- Stepmother: Liang Yalan
- Fiancé: Wang Enjia (They had a daughter who was given away immediately after birth).
- Partner: Xiao Jun (They had a son who died in infancy).
- Husband: Duanmu Hongliang (Married in 1938).

== Legacy and memorials ==
Xiao Hong's legacy is extensively commemorated in China, particularly in her hometown of Hulan and in Guangzhou, where her remains were eventually relocated.

- Xiao Hong's Former Residence: Located at No. 204 Erdao Street, Hulan District, Harbin. Built in 1908, it is her birthplace and now serves as a memorial museum, designated as a Provincial Cultural Relic in 1986.
- Xiao Hong Memorial Hall: Located in Hulan District, completed and opened in 2011 to mark her centenary.
- Xiao Hong Memorial Exhibition Room: Located in Daowai District, Harbin, on the site of the former Dongxing Shun Hotel, where she was trapped in 1932 and first met Xiao Jun.
- Xiao Hong's Tomb: Located in the Galaxy Revolutionary Cemetery in Guangzhou. Her ashes were moved from Hong Kong to Guangzhou in August 1957.
- Xiao Hong Monument and Tomb: Located in Xigang Park, Hulan District. Built in 1992, the monument features a bronze relief of her head, and the granite sarcophagus contains a lock of her hair preserved by Duanmu Hongliang for 50 years.
- Institutions and Streets: Several institutions and streets in Harbin bear her name, including Xiao Hong Primary School, Xiao Hong Middle School, Xiao Hong Avenue, and the Xiao Hong Research Association (founded in 2009).
- Xiao Hong Literary Award: Established in 2011 by the Heilongjiang Provincial Committee of the CCP and the People's Daily Press.

== In popular culture ==
Xiao Hong's turbulent life and literary brilliance have inspired numerous cinematic and television adaptations:

- Falling Flowers (2013), a biographical film directed by Huo Jianqi, starring Song Jia as Xiao Hong and Huang Jue as Xiao Jun.
- The Golden Era (2014), an epic biographical film directed by Ann Hui, starring Tang Wei as Xiao Hong, Feng Shaofeng as Xiao Jun, and Zhu Yawin as Duanmu Hongliang.
- The Trekker: Xiao Hong (2019), a television documentary directed by Wei Shiyu, produced by RTHK.
- Six Notes on Xiao Jun (2022), a documentary featuring archival insights into her relationship with Xiao Jun.
