= Xiao Jun =

Chinese writer

- Born: Liu Honglin (刘鸿霖); July 3, 1907; Linghai, Liaoning, Qing China
- Died: June 22, 1988 (aged 80); Beijing, China
- Education: Northeast Military Academy
- Occupation: Writer
- Writing career
- Pen name: Sanlang (三郎); Tian Jun (田军)
- Language: Chinese
- Period: 1931–1988
- Genre: Novel
- Notable work: The Village in August

Chinese name
- Traditional Chinese: 蕭軍
- Simplified Chinese: 萧军
Transcriptions
Standard Mandarin
- Hanyu Pinyin: Xiāo Jūn

Xiao Jun (simplified Chinese: 萧军; traditional Chinese: 蕭軍; pinyin: Xiāo Jūn, 3 July 1907 – 22 June 1988), born Liu Honglin (劉鴻霖), was a Chinese author and intellectual from Linghai, Liaoning, China. Of Manchu ethnicity, Xiao's most famous work in China is his 1934 novel Village in August (八月的鄉村) which gained both popular and critical praise as anti-Japanese literature. He, along with Xiao Hong, is considered one of the most representative authors of the left-wing Northeast Authors Group (東北作家群). The names Xiao Hong and Xiao Jun were chosen by each author so that when put together they would be xiao xiao hongjun (小小紅軍, tiny red army).

== Early career ==
In 1925, he entered the Northeast Military Academy (東北陸軍講武堂) which was organized under Zhang Xueliang where he studied law and military affairs. He began writing novels sometime during his studies and in 1929 published the nove Nuo... (懦.../Coward...) which was highly critical of the warlords tearing apart China. He published several more novels, all of which appeared in the Shengjing Times (盛京時報).

== Work with Xiao Hong ==
In 1932, he left for Harbin, where he began a literary career in earnest. In 1933, he met Xiao Hong with whom he co-authored Bashe (跋涉, An Arduous Journey) and both published for the first time under their Xiao pseudonyms. In 1934, Xiao Jun and Xiao Hong worked together in Qingdao on the supplement to Qingdao Morning Post (青島晨報) and Xiao Jun finished his most well-known work Village in August.

In July 1937, he published the novel illegally and out of his own pocket, since the KMT held to a policy of non-resistance and did not want to incite the Japanese whom Chiang Kai-shek knew were superior militarily and could obliterate China if they wanted. The novel had an immediate impact and cemented his reputation among the literati of the time. This period saw the unleashing of Xiao's creativity with a number of short stories, novellas, essays, and the beginning of his second masterwork Di san dai (第三代, Third Generation) which he wrote on and off for nearly twenty years. It depicts China's old feudal society, the era of bourgeois revolution, imperialism, the warlord era, and the realities of Northeastern Chinese society.

== Yan'an and Harbin ==
He fled to Yan'an during the Second World War in June 1940, where he worked with many other famous writers and was active in Yan'an's cultural activities. On December 19, 1940, he began holding a Monthly Meeting of Arts and Literature (文藝月會) which eventually led to publishing the Arts and Literature Monthly (文藝月報) which he edited in conjunction with Ding Ling, Shu Qun, and Liu Xuewei.

In 1942, motivated by a campaign to criticize sectarianism in the Chinese Communist Party, which encouraged party organs to listen to non-party members,Liberation Daily published his essay On 'Love' and 'Patience' towards Comraades, which was revised by Mao. This same year, he was the first to speak at the Yan'an Forum after Mao's opening statement.

He returned to Harbin in 1946, where he was chosen to edit and write for the Cultural Gazette (文化報), a journal he started under party patronage in 1947 on the anniversary of the May Fourth Movement. His writings quickly drew the ire of many of the top level cadres at Yan'an whom he criticized for their pedantic treatment of the people, equating them one time to clowns who try to hypnotize their gullible audiences. His prestige however gained him a degree of immunity from punitive actions for over a year at which time a number of articles appeared attacking Xiao for his simplistic anti-Japanese nationalism and political immaturity for not engaging socialist class struggle. "Criticism meetings" soon followed, and the Central Committee of the Chinese Communist Party decided to send Xiao to work with coal miners in Fushun, Liaoning.

== People's Republic era and death ==
He began writing again professionally in the 1950s in Beijing. His period of hardship in the mines inspired Wuyue de kuangshan (五月的礦山, Mine in May). He also published his letters between himself and Lu Xun and Xiao Hong and finished Di san dai.

His writing came to an end in 1957 when he was labeled a rightist. Under this campaign, his essay On 'Love' and 'Patience' towards Comrades', along with Wang Shiwei's Wild Lilies and Ding Ling's Thoughts on International Working Women's Day, were republished in a Special Re-Criticism Issue as an example of the "great poisonous weeds" written by Rightists intellectuals.

He was imprisoned during the Cultural Revolution, but rehabilitated in 1979 after which he became active again in literary circles until he died due to health complications in 1988.

== See also ==
- Zhang Yumao, literary scholar and expert on Xiao Jun
