= Duanmu Hongliang =

- Born: Cao Jingping; 25 September 1912
- Died: 5 October 1996 (aged 84)
- Education: Tianjin Nankai High School; Tsinghua University
- Spouse(s): Xiao Hong, Zhong Yaoqun

Duanmu Hongliang (Chinese: 端木蕻良; pinyin: Duānmù Hòngliáng; Wade–Giles: Tuan-mu Hung-liang; 1912–1996), born Cao Jingping (Chinese: 曹京平; pinyin: Cáo Jīngpíng), was a Chinese writer whose works were prominent during the Second Sino-Japanese War and for whom the land and environment were pivotal fictional elements. He was born in Changtu County, Liaoning and died in Beijing on October 5, 1996, at the age of 84.

In Rehe-Chahar Sun Dianying's army was joined by Duanmu Hongliang.

Duanmu attended Tsinghua University, where he studied and wrote fiction, but returned to his homeland of Liaoning in his post-university years. His fiction in both short stories and novels are characterized by the 'native soil' style, which heavily emphasizes the agrarian environment and heartland values of his homeland region, a style pioneered by Duanmu and other Modern Chinese authors such as Shen Congwen.

In his novels dating from before the Chinese Communist Revolution in 1949, Duanmu evidences his ardour for traditional Chinese fiction tropes, including heroes that join Anti-Japanese volunteer armies in northeast China, most evidently in "The Ke'erqin Banner Grasslands" (科爾沁旗草原), about a Liaoning family assigned by the Qing government to live among the Khorchin Mongols. "Eyes of Daybreak" (黎明的眼睛) and "An Early Spring" (早春) are his most important short stories, featuring earthy characters and simple plots focused on rural people, shown in a very positive light.
