= Zhang Dinghuang =

Chinese educator, scholar, expert in manuscripts and antiquities (1895–1986)

- 张定璜
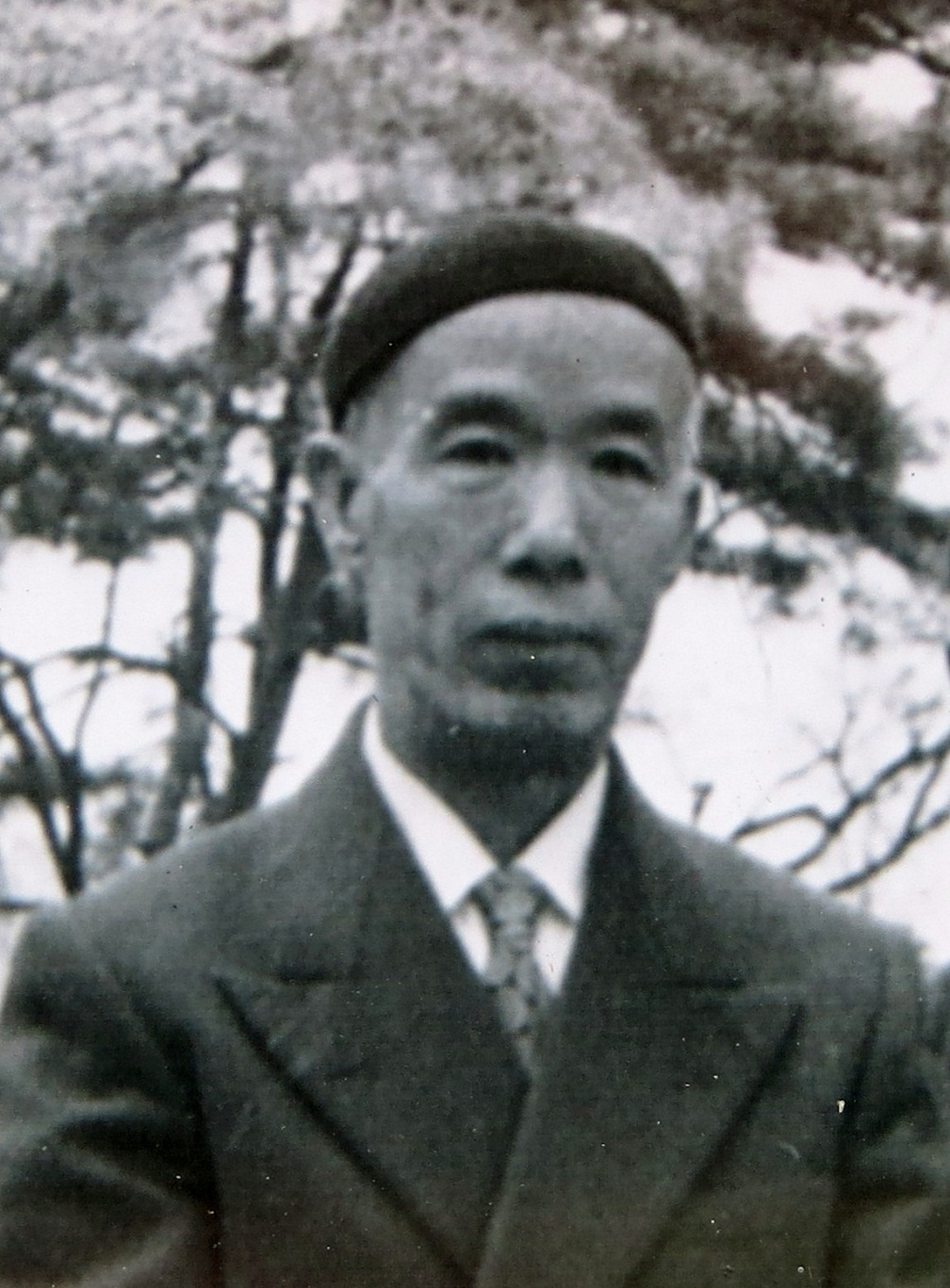
- Zhang in the 1960s, Tokyo
- Born: December 1895; Nanchang, Jiangxi, Qing dynasty
- Died: February 2, 1986 (aged 90); Atlanta, Georgia, United States
- Other names: Zhang Fengju, Chang Feng-Chu, 张凤举
- Occupations: Antiquarian, linguist, literary critic, poet, translator
- Organization(s): Ministry of Education, Republic of China
- Notable work: 1920-30s – development of modern Chinese language and literature styles 1940-50s – preservation and recovery of cultural antiquities plundered in WWII
- Relatives: Zhang Dingfan (brother)

Zhang Dinghuang
- Simplified Chinese: 张定璜
Transcriptions
Standard Mandarin
- Hanyu Pinyin: Zhāng Dìnghuáng

Zhang Fengju
- Simplified Chinese: 张凤举
Transcriptions
Standard Mandarin
- Hanyu Pinyin: Zhang Fengju

Zhang Dinghuang (1895–1986), also known as Zhang Fengju, was a Chinese–American antiquarian, linguist, literary critic, poet, and translator. He was born in Nanchang and is an expert in antique manuscripts. Zhang was a supporting but key figure of the rich 20th century Chinese literary movements.

He was a talented multi-linguist who studied in Japan and France, a professor at Beijing University. He was also a professor at Sino Franco University, and was active in the literary scene. After World War II, he was a primary figure to recover a collection of looted antique manuscripts for Taiwan's National Central Library (the literary equivalent of antiques of the Palace Museum).

== Early years ==
When 15 years old, he enrolled in the Nanchang Army Survey Academy, following elder brother Zhang Dingfan, an officer in the "Dare to Die" regiment of the Xinhai Revolution. He then attended Kyoto Imperial University. Returning from Japan in 1921, he began his literary and teaching career of the 1920s and 1930s, and activity to develop vernacular Chinese literature.

He taught at Peking Women's College of Education, Peking University, Paris L'Institute des Hautes Études Chinoises of the Sorbonne in the 1930s, and the Sino-French University in Shanghai. He mastered Japanese, French, and English, which would serve him well decades later. Returning from France in 1937 he married Zhang Huijun.

Zhang authored and translated works in French, Japanese and English. Examples include "Shelley" and "Baudelaire". He worked closely with key figures who shaped modern Chinese literature and education today. These included Guo Moruo, Cheng Fangwu, Zhang Ziping, Zheng Boqi, Xu Zuzheng, Shen Yinmo, Lu Xun, and Yu Dafu. All of them participated in the journals Creation Quarterly, Yusi, Contemporary Review, and New Youth. These provided forums for lively and heated discourse on the transition to the vernacular Chinese language; weeklies for short insights or responses, quarterlies for considered and developed ideas. The goal was to bring the written language closer to everyday speech and use subject matter from everyday life.

== Later years after 1940 ==
In the 1940s, he worked primarily for the Chinese Ministry of Education and National Central Library in the areas of antiquities, education and publications. A lasting achievement was to recover the works of the Rare Book Preservation Society which were looted during World War II. It began with the Yuyuan Road Conferences in 1945–1946 to identify the wartime booty that Japan took. Key members included Jiang Fucong, Ma Xulun, Zheng Zhenduo, and Zhang Fengju. Official Yuyuan Road Ministry conference minutes shows his signature in the first line.

March 23, 1946, the Ministry appointed Zhang Fengju to the Chinese Occupation Mission in Japan as head of the Fourth Section (Education and Culture). He left for Tokyo on April 1 and began discussions with the U.S. Command General Headquarters (GHQ) the next day. Because of his gift in languages and his participation in the original preservation effort, he held substantive meetings with all parties without translators. Meetings both within the Mission and with US parties were often held at night. They were all respectively busy with leads in Japan. In two months, over 135,000 volumes were retrieved. By the year's end, they were returned to the National Central Library where they form the core of the rare books collection today. Many other university and museum collections were also retrieved. The following Wikipedia article describes the recovery in Japan. It took less than two weeks after Chang arrived in Tokyo. Rare Book Preservation Society

After 1949 and with the excesses which followed the Chinese Civil War, his closest friends and associates from the early years were on the mainland. His closest recent associates were in Taiwan. He favored neither side and preferred non-violence. He did not participate in any government activities after 1960 but kept in touch with a network of old friends in Taiwan and the U.S. including Li Shu-hua, Zhu Jiahua, Gu Mengyu, Y. H. Ku, Zhu Shiming General Chu Shi-ming, and Shang Zhen. He moved to the U.S. with his wife in 1965 to join his children. He died on February 2, 1986, in Atlanta, Georgia.

His handwritten diaries and reports, now at National Central Library in Taipei, contain details of the recovery looted manuscripts and books from Tokyo.
