= Tattler (Chinese periodical) =

Tattler (Yusi)
- first issue of Tattler
- Editor-in-chief: Sun Fuyuan (孫伏園), Lu Xun
- Frequency: Weekly
- Publisher: Tattler Publisher, Beijing
- First issue: November 17, 1924
- Final issue: March 1930
- Country: China
- Language: Chinese

Tattler (Chinese: 語絲; pinyin: Yǔsī; lit. 'Language Thread') was an important Chinese weekly journal founded in 1924 and very influential in the establishment of the new literature in China. It later changed into a semi-monthly and finally ceased publication in March 1930. It fostered a distinctive "Tattler literary style" (語絲文體).

== Publishing history ==
Tattler was founded primarily by Liang Yuchun (梁遇春), Zhou Zuoren, Lu Xun, Lin Yutang, Qian Xuantong, Yu Pingbo, Liu Bannong, and others. Sun Fuyuan (孫伏園) was the editor, but Lu Xun was actually the prime mover. The Beiyang Government shut down the magazine after its 153rd issue October 15, necessitating a move to Shanghai. The 154th issue was published in Shanghai with Lu Xun as editor.

=== Style ===
Tattler primarily published essays. Its associated circle of scholars had somewhat different views about subject matters and writing styles. But they were united in a desire to expose and remedy social ills of the time, banishing the traditional and welcoming the new, with open discussion of major issues and free discussion without preconceived ideas. The published works generally addressed serious and substantial matters with a light touch, using simple and clear language, without regard to convention and often with a biting style. This came to be known as the "Tattler literary style" (語絲文體). Good examples of the style are to be found in Lu Xun's 43 poems, essays and novellas published in the journal, and in the short essays of Zhou Zuoren. All the writings were in the style of the vernacular Chinese "new literature". Following the move to Shanghai in 1927, Tattler articles became increasingly more literary and less political.

=== March 18 Massacre ===
On March 18 1926 there was a large demonstration in front of the Beiyang government offices. It was specifically a protest against the Japanese warship shelling of Taku Forts on the 12th; and was also generally vociferous about the unequal treaties with foreign powers. Government troops and police shot into the unarmed crowd and killed 47 students (including some at the Women's Normal University), also wounding over 200. This came to be known as the March 18 Massacre The Tattler contributors promptly produced a stream of emotional and biting articles for several months. Many of them taught at the universities and knew the student participants. The style of these writings differed substantially from the restrained articles to be found in "Contemporary Review". Both journals published articles calling into question the legitimacy of the Beiyang government under Duan Qirui.

=== Modernizing written Chinese ===
Early Republic of China journals such as "Contemporary Review" along with "La Jeunesse" (founded 1915), "Creation Quarterly" (1921), "Tattler" (November 1924) and others played a critical role in modernizing the Chinese written language. All these young scholars were enthused by the successful 1911 Xinhai Revolution which ended two thousand years of imperial rule. Their goal was a different revolution, that of the written language, changing it from the classical to the spoken vernacular and so bringing it closer to the general population. These talented writers and scholars had close relationships with successive education ministries. They established the education system and the curriculum. (Hu Shih for example served as Education Minister for the Republic of China. Cheng Fangwu of "Creation Quarterly" set up the Red Army education system for the Long March and beyond. By the end of the 20th century, the Chinese general population achieved a much higher level of literacy, taking more than 50 years. But the vernacular form is now the normal printed or written Chinese language.

=== Representative Issues ===
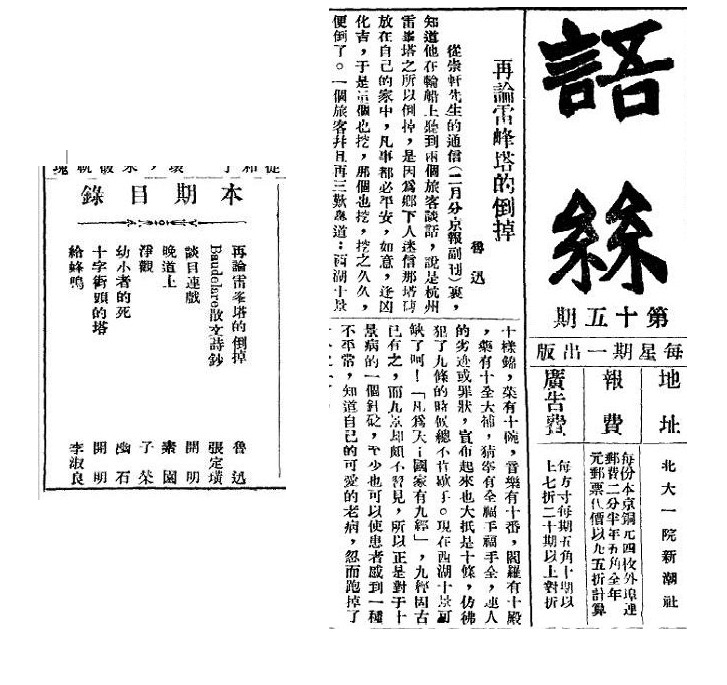

This is the masthead and table of contents for the 15th issue, February 6, 1925. It hints at the contents of the journal and their scope before the March 18 Massacre.

Articles:

- Another Discussion on the Collapse of Lei Feng Pagoda by Lu Xun
- Collection of Essays and Poems by Baudelaire, Zhang Dinghuan (張定璜)
- On Mulian Opera (目連戲), Kai Ming (開明)
- On the Road at Dusk, by Tai Yuan (泰園)
- Purity of Perception (buddhist concept), Zi Rong (子榮)
- Death of a Child, by You Shi (幽石)
- Pagoda at the Crossroad, by Kai Ming (開明)

=== Lu Xun and White Snake ===
The Leifeng Pagoda article was revisiting an earlier article (next to masthead, picture above) on the subject by Lu Xun. The pagoda was on the south shore of the West Lake in Hangzhou, a glorious golden sunset site for over a thousand years. It finally collapsed in 1924. Lu Xun wrote a short essay about the pagoda and its collapse, with unmistakable irony mirroring the misguided policies of the Beiyang government which was cracking down on dissidents in order to support the status quo. He used an engaging, light and self-deprecating style with everyday conversational language. It was an essay and a retelling of an ancient folklore, and being short as well, the reader was encouraged to read to the end.

Lu Xun begins by writing that his grandmother told him once upon a time a man called Xu Xian rescued two snakes, one white and one green. To repay his kindness, the white snake transformed into a beautiful maiden and became his wife. One day an itinerant monk Fa Hai 法海 called and sensed the wife's origin. The monk locked Xu in the tower and lured the wife to him. He then cast a spell on her and moved the pagoda over the white snake, forever burying her below. But the majority of ordinary people (except perhaps monks) were sympathetic with the white snake and not with the busybody monk.

As time went on, the pagoda was ravaged by successive wars and wokou raids. Its golden coating was burnt and bare bricks were exposed. Various relics and sacred Buddhist scrolls were found in hidden crevices. According to superstition, even the bricks had supernatural powers to heal, and also increase virility. They were stolen one by one until the pagoda collapsed in 1924. Lu Xun likened the bedrock of the Duan Qirui government to these bricks. In the folklore, the white snake was ultimately freed by the Jade Emperor of the Heavens. Fa Hai the monk had to conceal himself within the shell of a crab constantly seeking a hiding place. Lu Xun then described in great detail how to eat a crab by first peeling away the outer shell, consume the delicate eggs or gel, remove a white layer, and finally reveal the inedible inner shell which has an image of the monk.
