= Mr. Lu Xun =

Mr. Lu Xun (Chinese: 鲁迅先生) by Zhang Dinghuang was the first comprehensive critique of Lu Xun's writings, published in Contemporary Review. Zhang (1895–1986) was an influential writer, translator and reviewer in the vernacular Chinese literature movement of the 1920s and 1930s.

== Brief Summary ==
"Mr. Lu Xun" is a two part review of all Lu's writings. It was published in two parts in the journal "Contemporary Review (现代评论)", 1925 January 24 and 31 issues. Zhang used a wealth of material to create images of Lu Xun's works. He compared and contrasted those with late Qing dynasty traditional wenyan classical writings. With this analysis and comparison, he concluded there are "two different languages, two kinds of feelings, and two different worlds". This became a defining image of Lu Xun's works. Zhang Dinghuang also appreciated Lu's "calm" 冷静. He said of Lu Xun's writing: "First, it is calm; second, it is calm; and third, it is calm." This came to be known as the "3 calms" 三个冷静 of Lu Xun. Zhang's writing of this review was both beautiful and lively, a rarity for critical reviews. He attached great importance to objectivity while writing reviews. At the end of the review, he related a story from Anatole France to remind the reader that a review critiques the writing objectively and not the writer personally.

Zhang Mengyang 张梦阳 of the Chinese Academy of Social Sciences published an essay "A Century of the Study of Lu Xun" 2012-11-21 in which he says about "Mr. Lu Xun", "This review is without doubt the first substantial essay about Lu Xun. It shaped the initial impression of his writings. The most important and the deepest contribution is the accurate description of the general spiritual and cultural transition represented by Lu Xun. For example upon reading 'A Madman's Diary' 狂人日记 we move from the shadows of candlelight into the bright summer sun. We go from the middle ages to today's world. Zhang Dinghuang accurately sensed Lu Xun's implicit meaning and vividly, accurately conveys it. Zhang thus established a historic place for Lu Xun's anthology 'Scream' 呐喊. Zhang was the first to recognize Lu Xun writings as the literary instruments of change from a medieval world to a contemporary one. He was a pioneering critic to establish the significance of this epochal transition. "
