= Contemporary Review (Chinese magazine) =

Chinese literary magazine (1924–1928)

- Editor-in-chief: Wang Shijie (王世杰)
- Frequency: Weekly
- Publisher: Contemporary Review Publisher
- First issue: December 13, 1924
- Final issue: December 1928
- Country: China
- Language: Chinese

Contemporary Review
- Traditional Chinese: 現代評論
- Simplified Chinese: 现代评论
Transcriptions
Standard Mandarin
- Hanyu Pinyin: Xiàndài Pínglùn
- Wade–Giles: Hsien4-tai4 P'ing2-lun4

Contemporary Review (traditional Chinese: 現代評論; simplified Chinese: 现代评论; pinyin: Xiàndài Pínglùn) was a weekly Chinese literary magazine published from December 1924 to December 1928.

== Publication history ==
Established in Beijing, Contemporary Review began printing weekly editions on December 13, 1924. The publication featured work from new literature writers, covering topics such as politics, economics, law, philosophy, education, science, and the arts. Many scholars affiliated with the magazine had studied in Europe or the United States, including Hu Shih (胡適), Gao Yihan (高一涵), Tang Youren (唐有壬), Chen Yuan (陳源), and Xu Zhimo (徐志摩). After 209 issues, the magazine ceased publication in December 1928. During its run, it produced 3 extra issues and a series of specials.

In the January 24 and January 31, 1925 issues, Zhang Dinghuang (張定璜) published "Mr. Lu Xun" (魯迅先生), a two-part review of Lu Xun's (鲁迅) writings.

Early Republic of China journals such as Contemporary Review, Fiction Monthly (founded in 1910), New Youth (Xin Qingnian) (founded in 1915), Creative Quarterly (founded in 1921), and Tattler (founded in 1924) were published during a period of significant change in written Chinese. These publications featured writers and scholars who lived through the 1911 Xinhai revolution, which marked the end of the Chinese monarchy and the establishment of the Republic of China. Hu Shih (胡適) later served as Education Minister for the Republic of China and Cheng Fangwu (成仿吾) of Creative Quarterly worked on the Red Army education system.

== Representative issues ==
First Issue Table of Contents of Contemporary Review

=== First Issue Table of Contents ===
- Editorial—Current Events
- Government by Law and Revolution by Yan Shutang
- The Critical Moment by Wang Shijie
- Generous Settlement Terms for the Qing Imperial Family
- "Beggar," a novella by Xi Lin
- "November 3rd" a novel by You Dafu
- "Difficulties of Translation" by Hu Shih
- "Philistines" by Xi Gu
