= Creation Society =

Historic Chinese cultural organisation (1921-1929)

- Creation Society
- 創造社
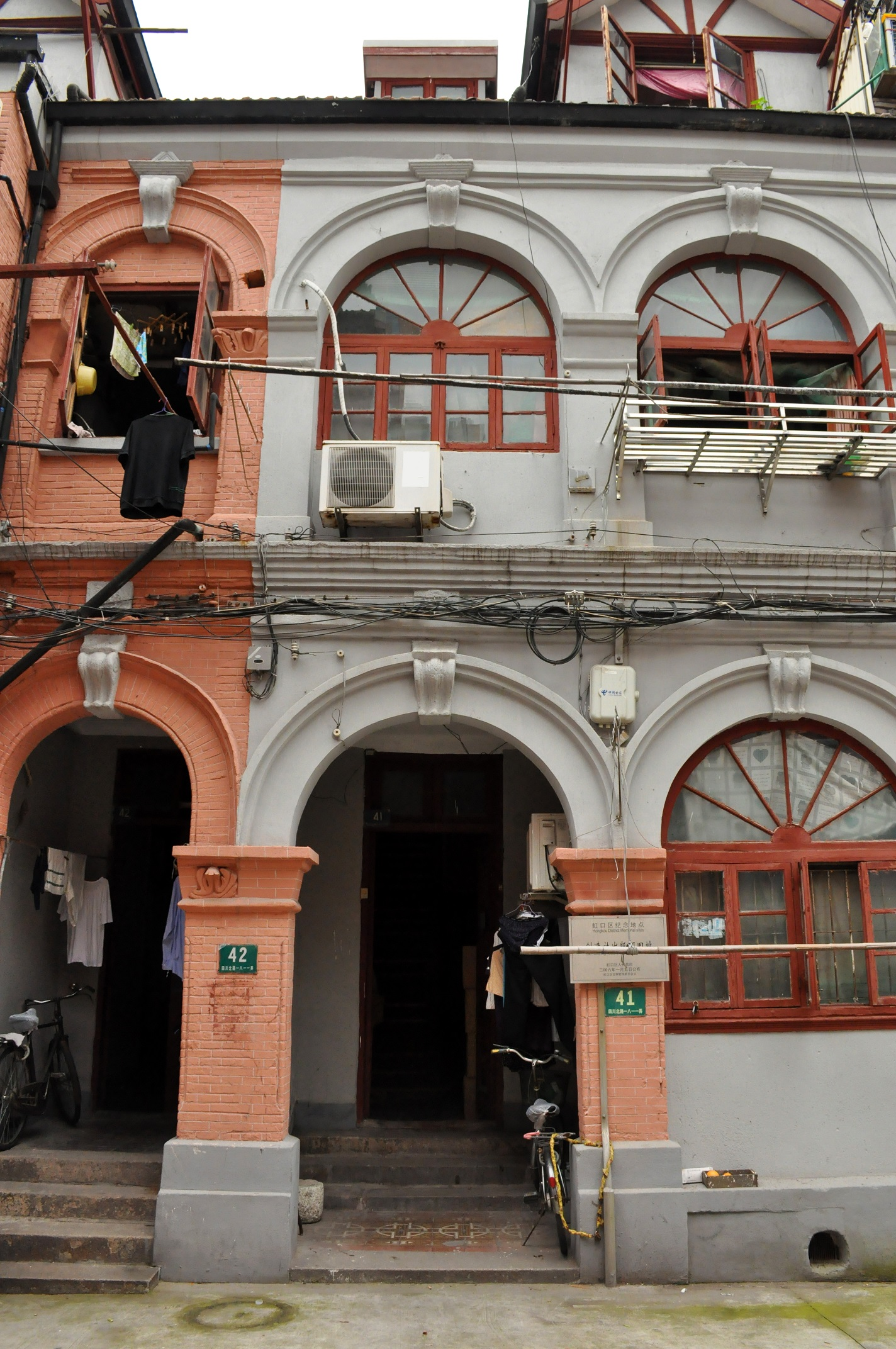
- 1811 Sichuan Road North, the site of the Creation Society press
- Established: 1921
- Founded at: Tokyo, Japan
- Dissolved: 1929
- Purpose: Literary society
- Key people: Guo Moruo; Yu Dafu; Zhang Ziping; Tian Han; Zheng Boqi; Cheng Fangwu

Creation Society
- Traditional Chinese: 創造社
- Simplified Chinese: 创造社
Transcriptions
Standard Mandarin
- Hanyu Pinyin: Chuàngzào shè
- Wade–Giles: Ch’uang-tsao she
Yue: Cantonese
- Yale Romanization: Chong jouh séh
- Jyutping: Cong3 zou6 se5

The Creation Society was a left-wing cultural organisation in China to encourage literary and cultural exploration. The founders wished to establish a 'society of art for art's sake'. The Society was established by a group of students who were studying in Japan, such as Guo Moruo, Yu Dafu, Zhang Ziping, Tian Han, Zheng Boqi, and Cheng Fangwu. It published eponymous quarterly. The Society was banned by the Nationalist government in 1929.
