= Contemporary review =

Contemporary Review has been used as a name for a number of magazines:

- The Contemporary Review
- Contemporary review 现代评论
