= Wu Fuheng =

President of Shandong University

Wu Fuheng (Chinese: 吴富恒; pinyin: Wú Fùhéng; 1911–2001) was the president of Shandong University from December 1979 to June 1984.

He was born in Luanxian, Hebei.

Academic offices
Preceded by Cheng Fangwu	President of Shandong University; 1979–1984	Succeeded by Deng Conghao
