= National Central Library (Taiwan) =

National library of Taiwan

Coordinates: 25°02′14″N 121°31′00″E

- 國家圖書館

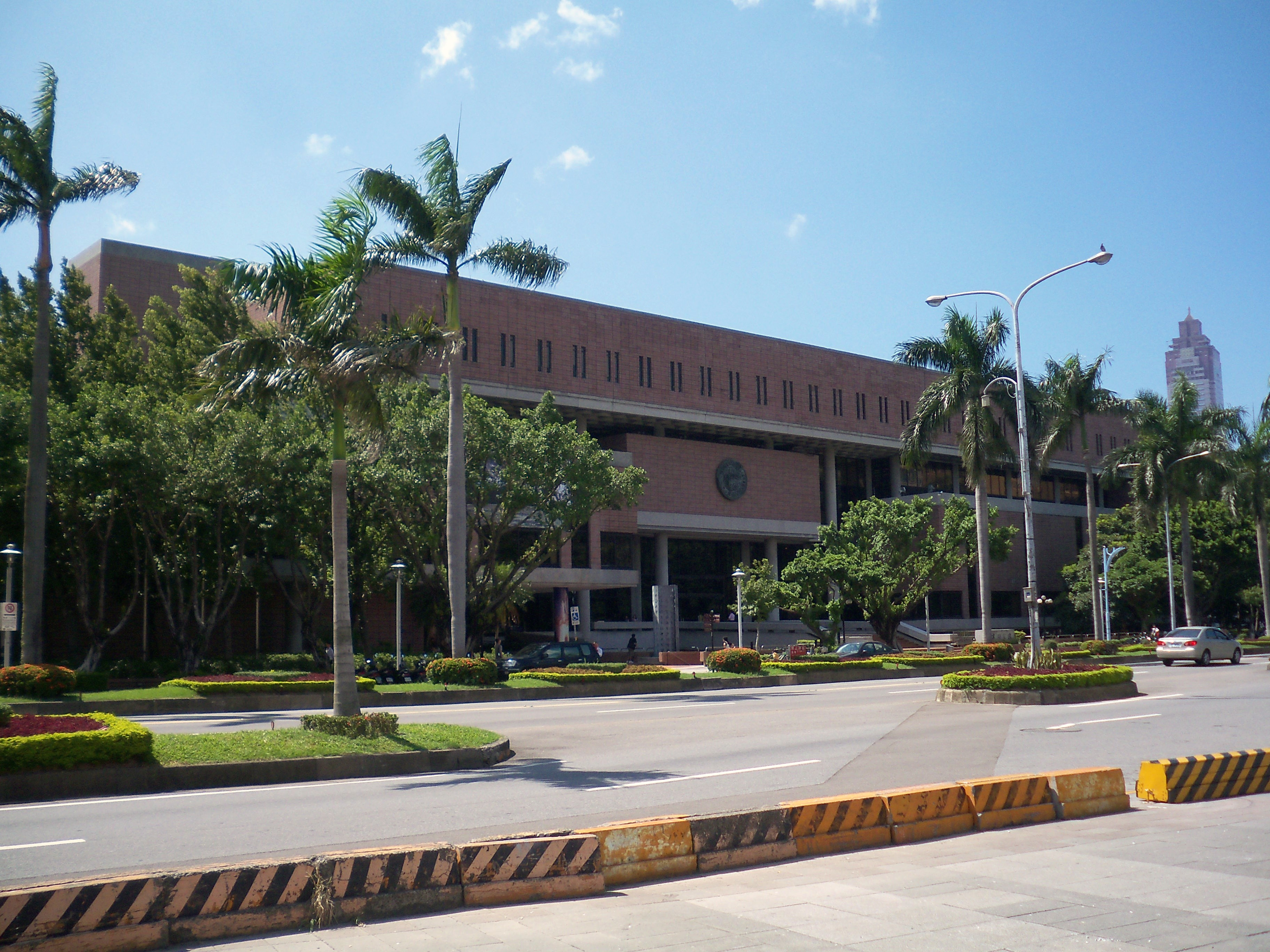
- The central headquarters at Taipei in August 2009
- Location: Taipei, Taiwan
- Established: 1933 (in Nanjing); 1949 (in Taipei)
- Branches: N/A

Access and use
- Circulation: Library does not publicly circulate

Other information
- Director: Han-Ching Wang
- Website: www.ncl.edu.tw

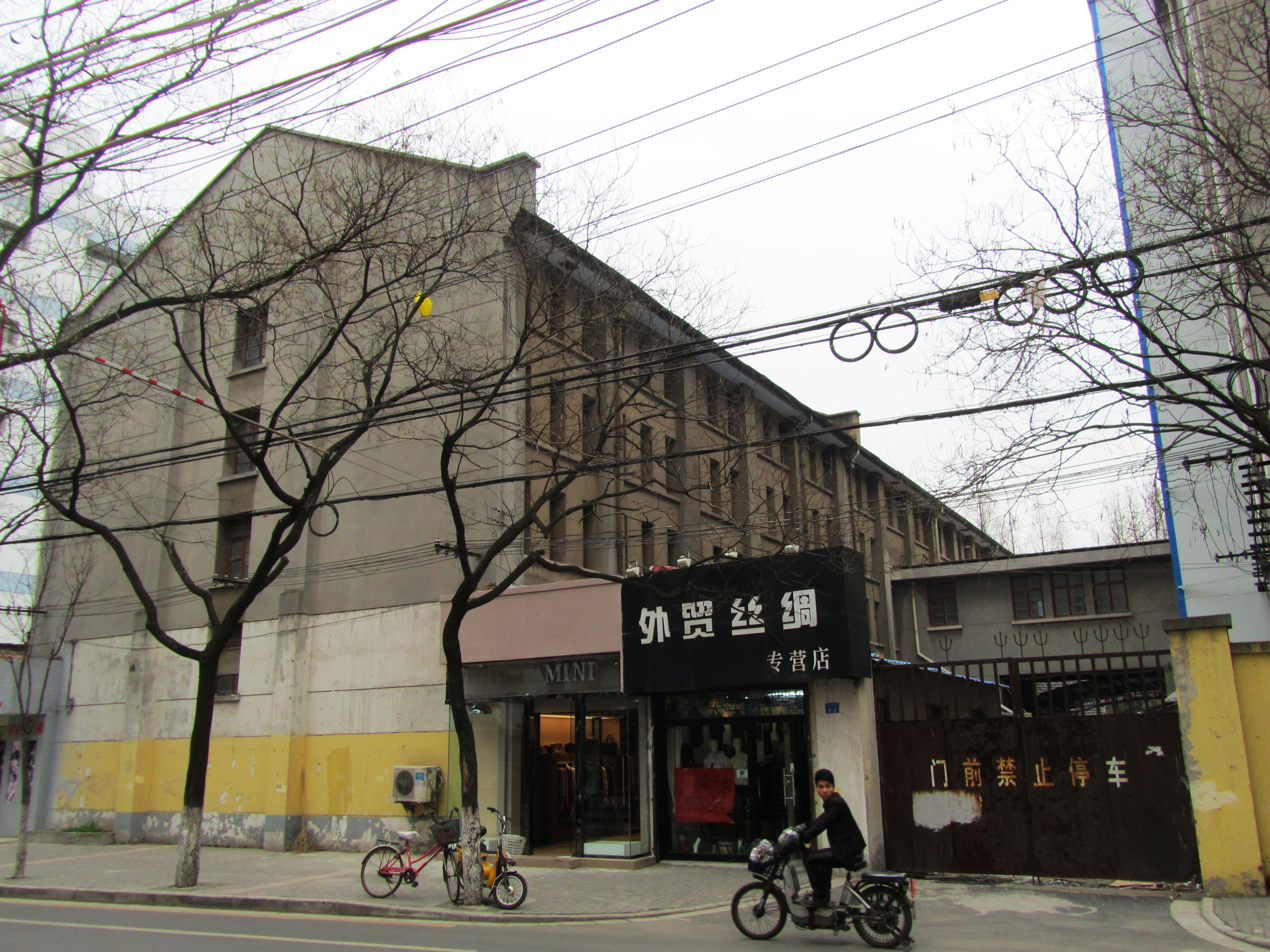
Former National Central Library in Nanjing.

The National Central Library (NCL; Chinese: 國家圖書館; pinyin: Guójiā Túshūguǎn; Pe̍h-ōe-jī: Kok-ka Tô͘-su-koán) is the national library of the Republic of China, located in Zhongzheng District, Taipei. It will soon have a subsidiary called Southern Branch of the National Central Library & National Repository Library.

== Mission ==
The National Central Library is the sole national library of Taiwan. Its mission is to acquire, catalog, and preserve national publications for government, research and general public use. The Rare Books Collection is one of the leading collections of Chinese antique books and manuscripts in the world. The library also assists research, sponsors educational activities, promotes librarianship, carries out international exchange activities, and strengthens cooperation between domestic and foreign libraries. The library also supports Sinological research through the affiliated Center for Chinese Studies (CCS). As a research library, the NCL encourages staff members to conduct research in specialized fields. The NCL also cooperates with publishers and other libraries to develop its role as a leading center for knowledge and information resources and services in Taiwan.

== Organization ==
Following a revision to its organic law on 31 January 1996, the NCL was administratively reorganized into the following departments: Director-general's Office, Acquisitions Division, Cataloging Division, Reader Services Division, Reference Services Division, Special Collection Division, Information Division, Guidance Division, Research Division, ISBN Center, Bibliographic Information Center, Sinology Research Center, International Publication Exchange Department, General Affair Division, Accounting Office, Personnel Office, Civil Service Ethics Office.

== History time line ==
- 1933: Founded in Nanjing, First Director Chiang Fu-Tsung (蔣復璁)
- 1938: Relocated to Chongqing
- 1940-41: "Rare Book Preservation Society" acquired 130,000 rare books & manuscripts for Library
- 1949: Relocated to Taipei, the remained in Nanjing was later renamed Nanjing Library
- 1954: Reopened to the public at the Nanhai Academy
- 1981: Began sponsorship of the Resource and Information Center for Chinese Studies
- 1987: Resource and Information Center for Chinese Studies renamed as the Center for Chinese Studies
- 1988: Opened the Information and Computing Library and closed in 2022
- 1996: The Organic Statute of the National Central Library promulgated
- 1998: Established Reference Services Division, Research Division, Guidance Division, Information Division
- 2003: 70th anniversary of the Library
- 2008: Opened the Arts and Audiovisual Center and closed in 2022
- 2022: Opened the OPEN LAB MULTIMEDIA CENTER

== Images ==
Logo of the library

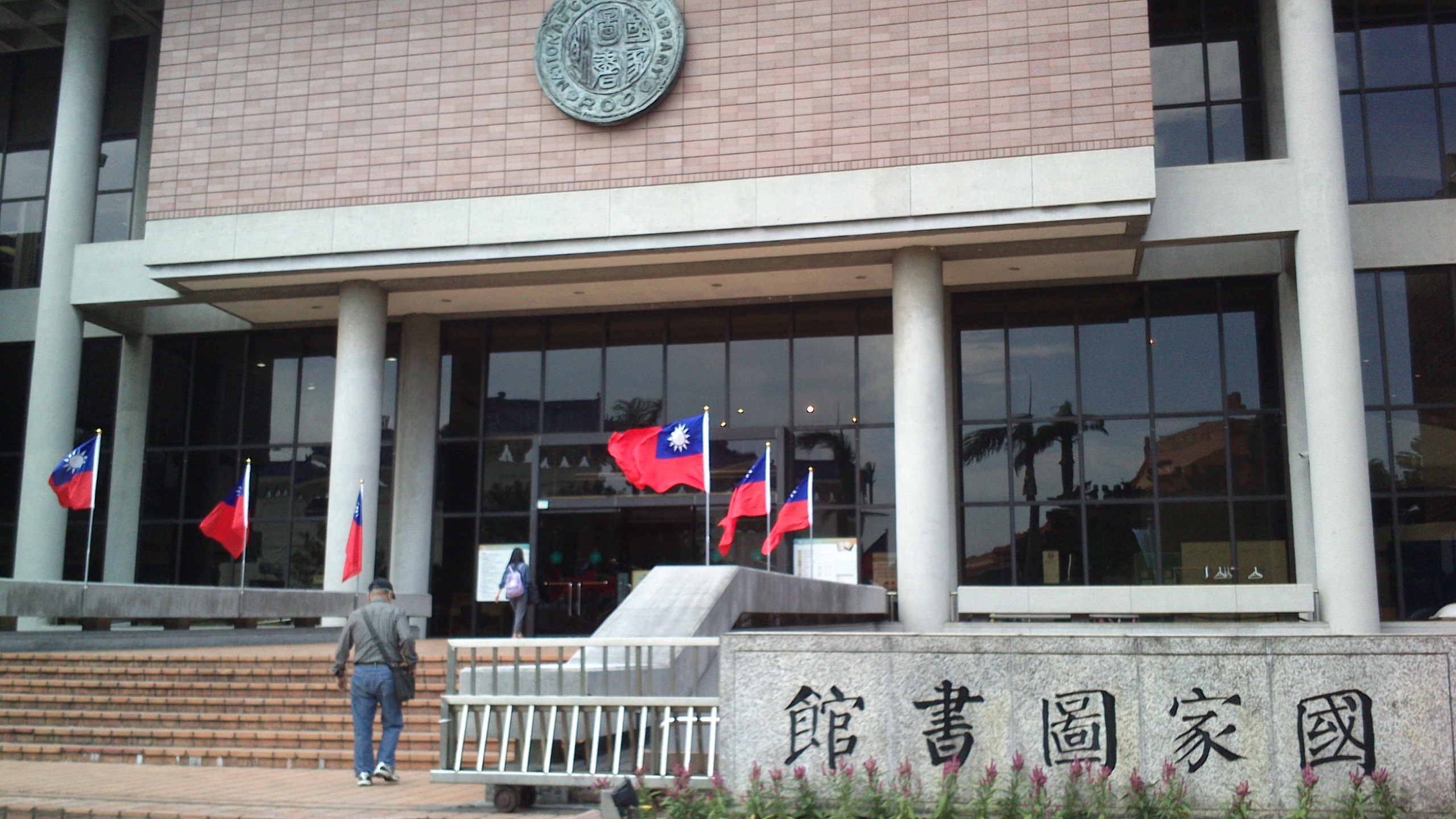
Gate of the library,

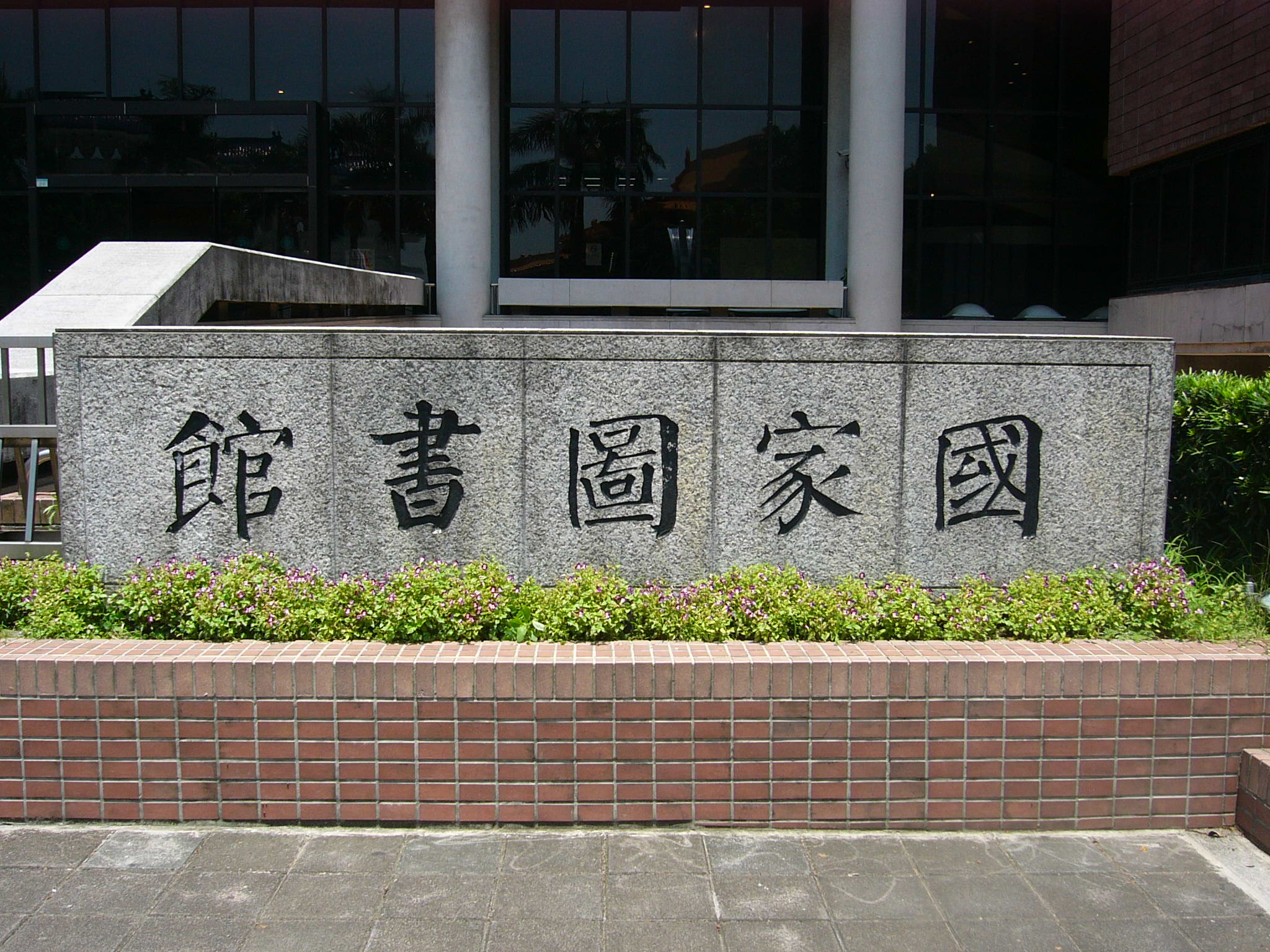
National Central Library Chinese logo in front of its headquarters

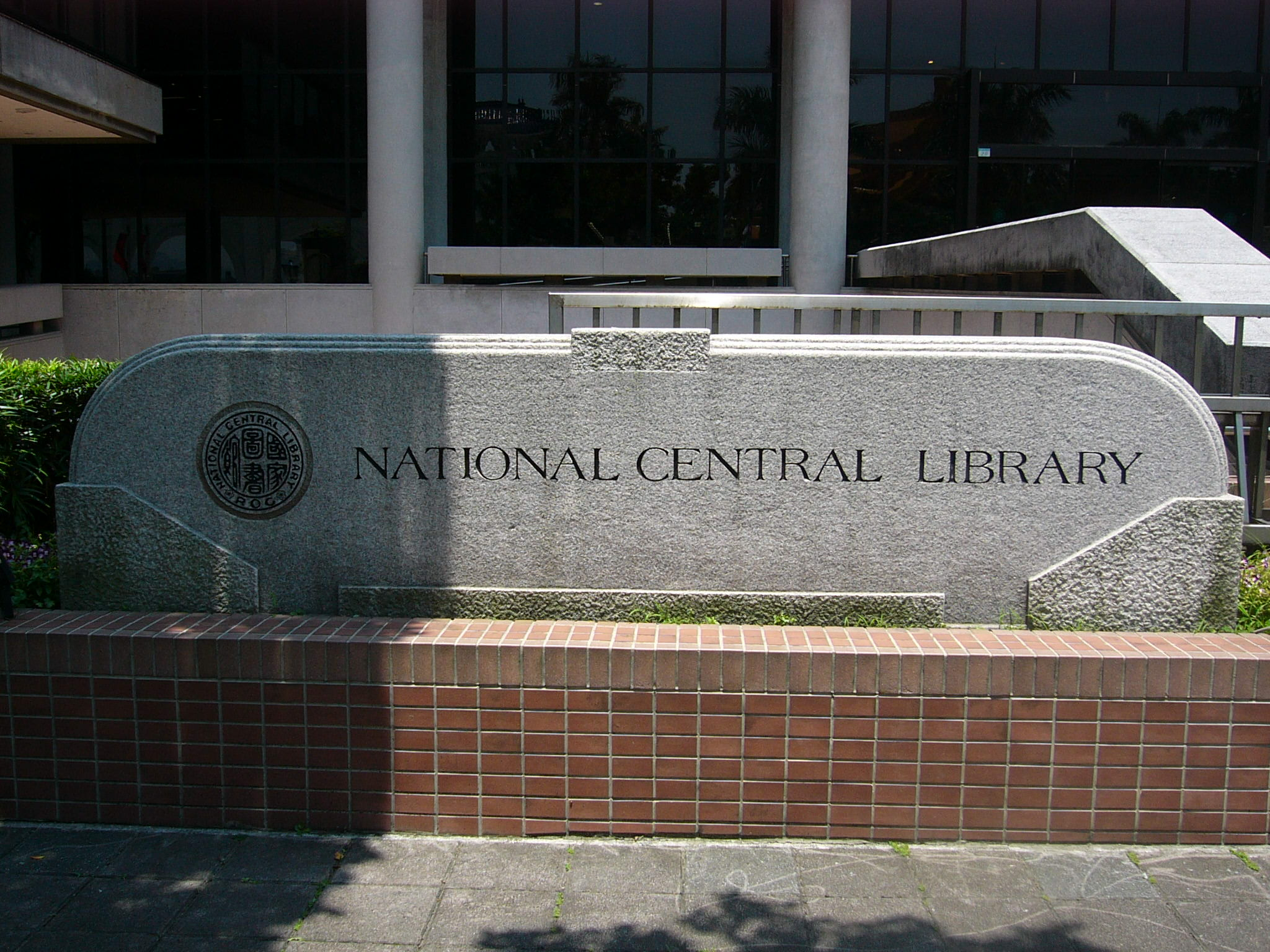
National Central Library English logo in front of its headquarters

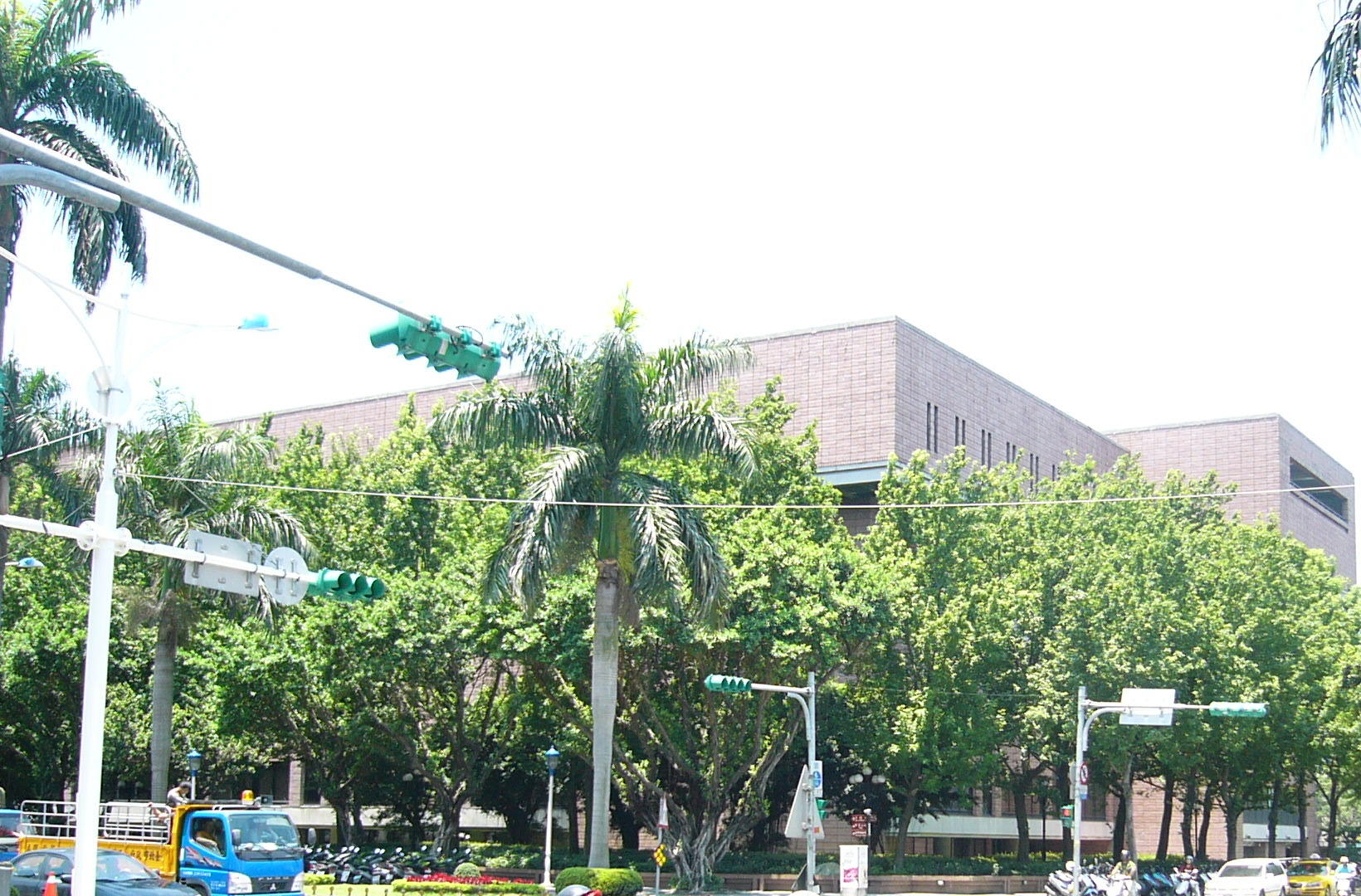
The right side of National Central Library headquarters

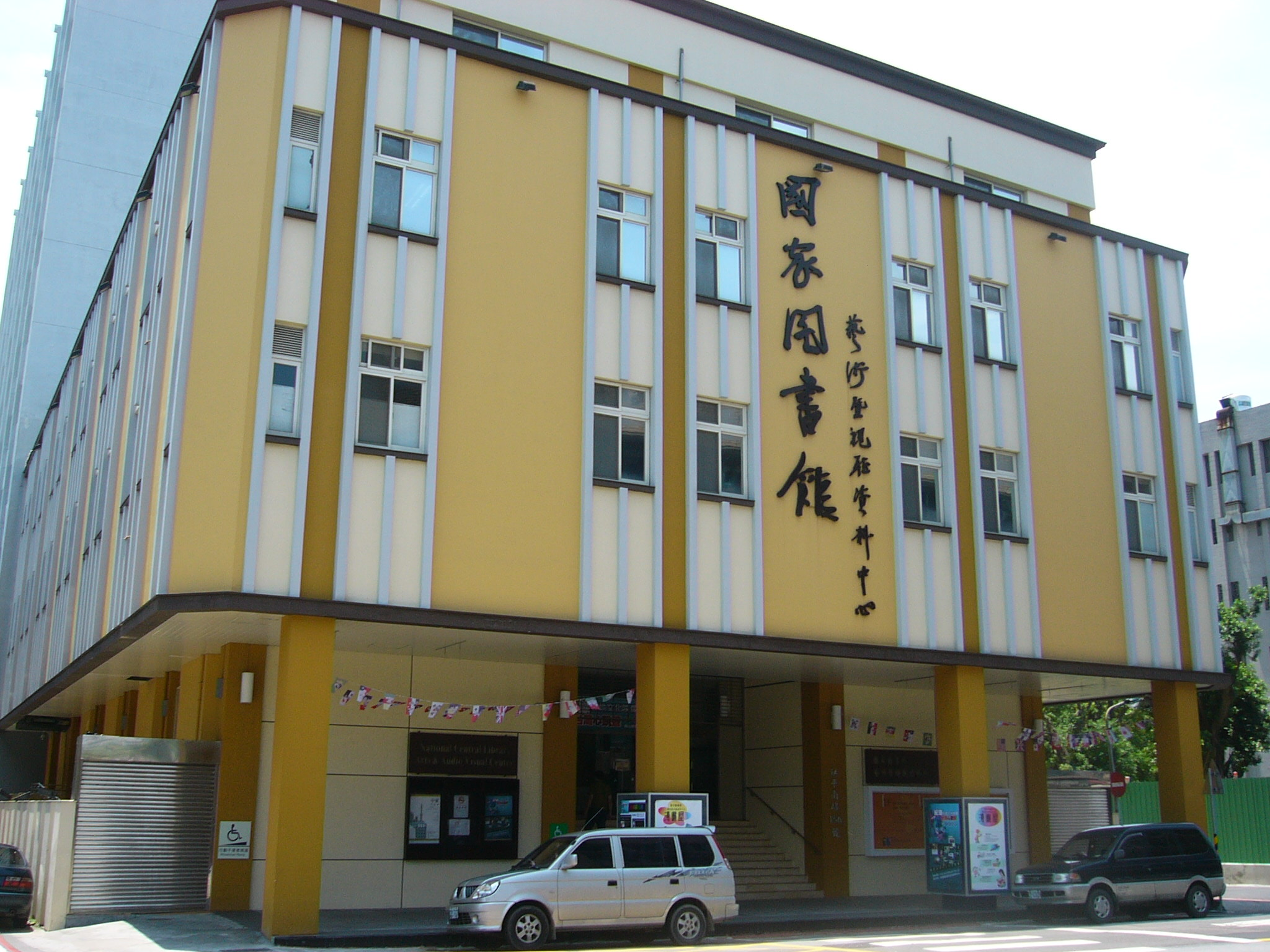
National Central Library's Arts and Audiovisual Center

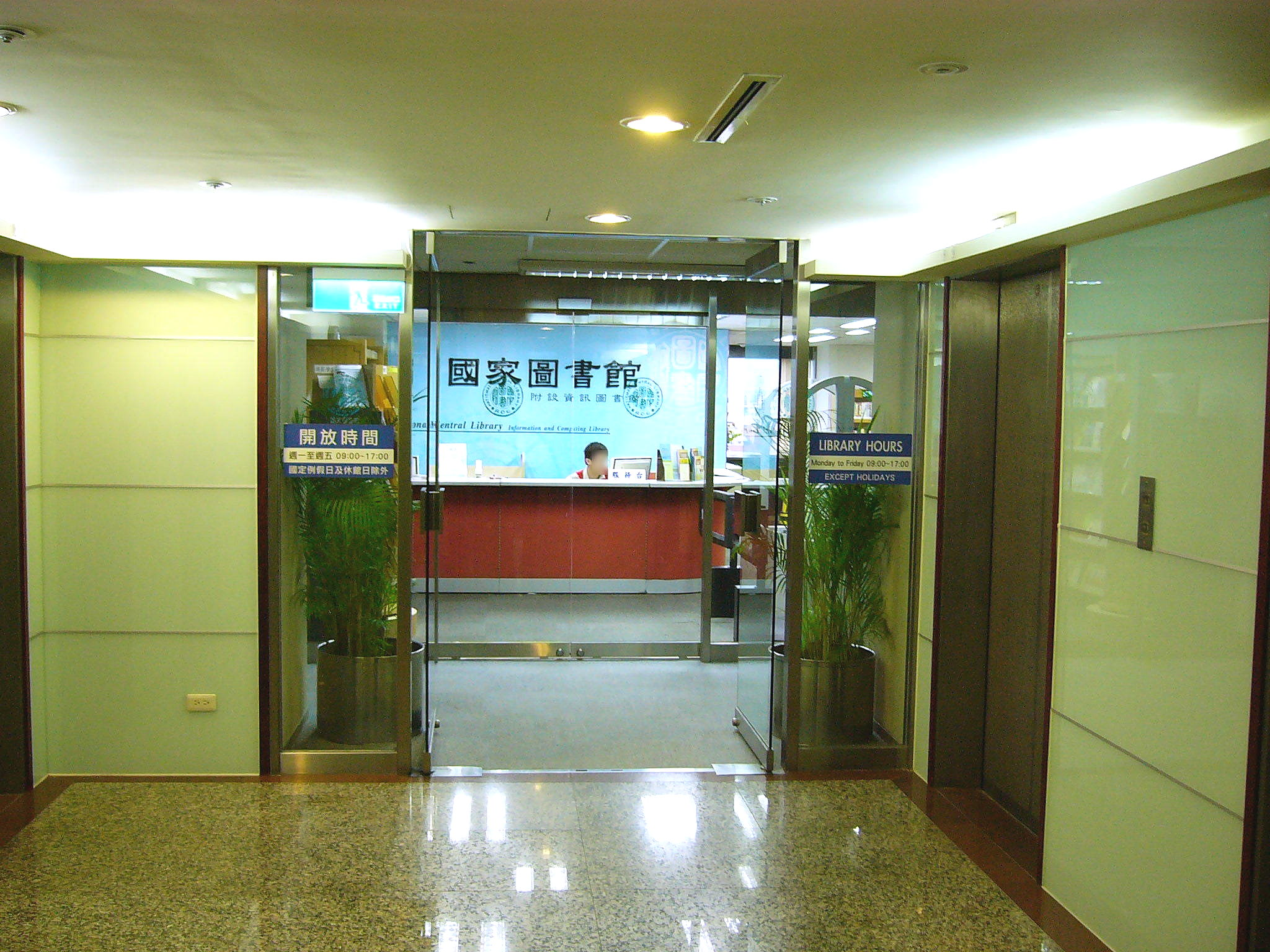
National Central Library's Information and Computing Library

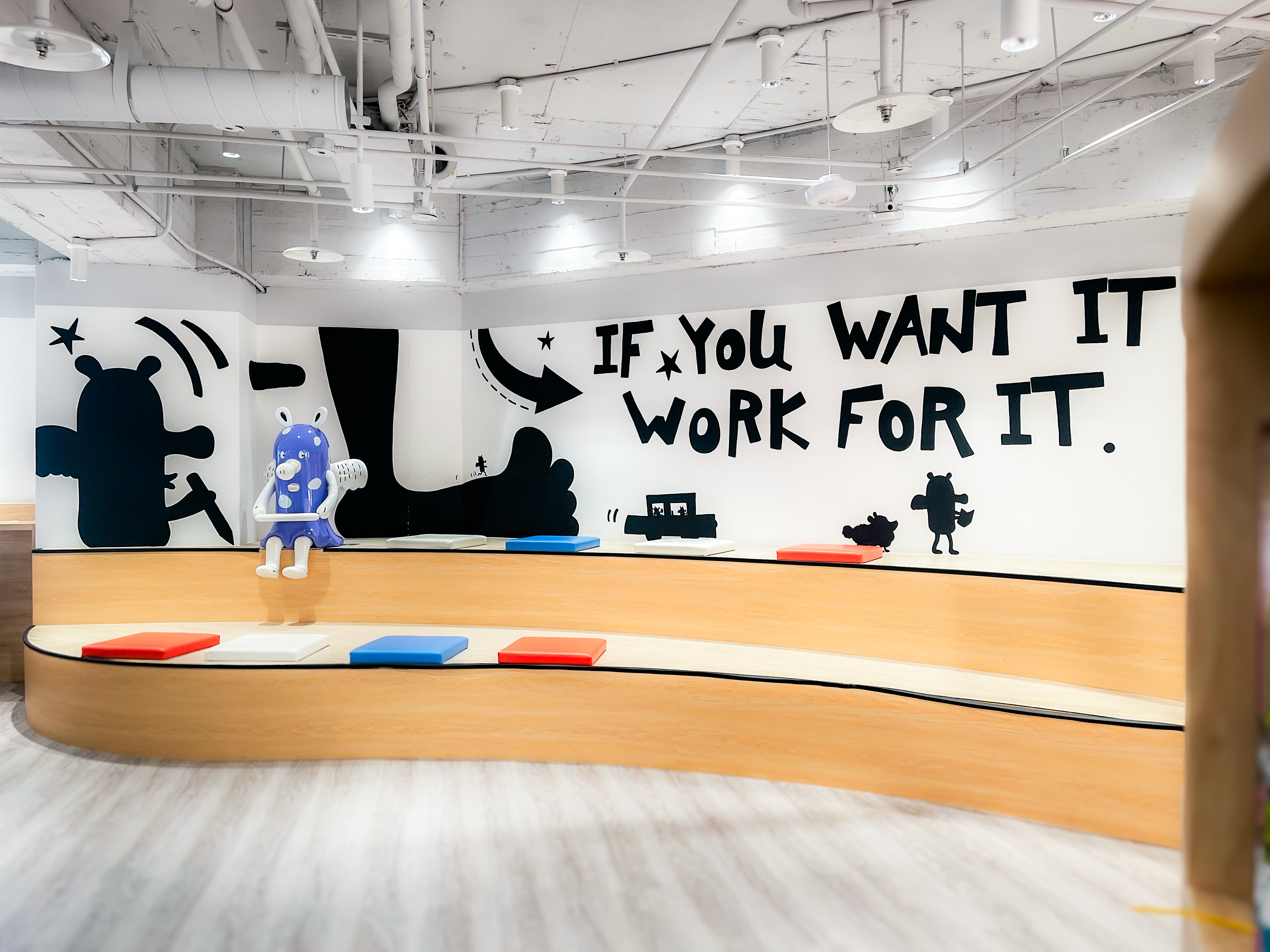
OPEN LAB Multimedia Center

== See also ==
- List of libraries in Taipei
- Nanjing Library
- Ningbo Library
