= Nine Diaries =

1927 book by Yu Dafu

Jih-chi chiu-chung (Nine Diaries) was the most popular book published by Chinese writer Yu Dafu. Written in 1927, it detailed the events of his affair with the leftist writer Wang Ying-hsia and broke all previous Chinese sales records.
