= Zhang Dingfan =

Chinese general (1891–1945)

Zhang Dingfan 张定璠
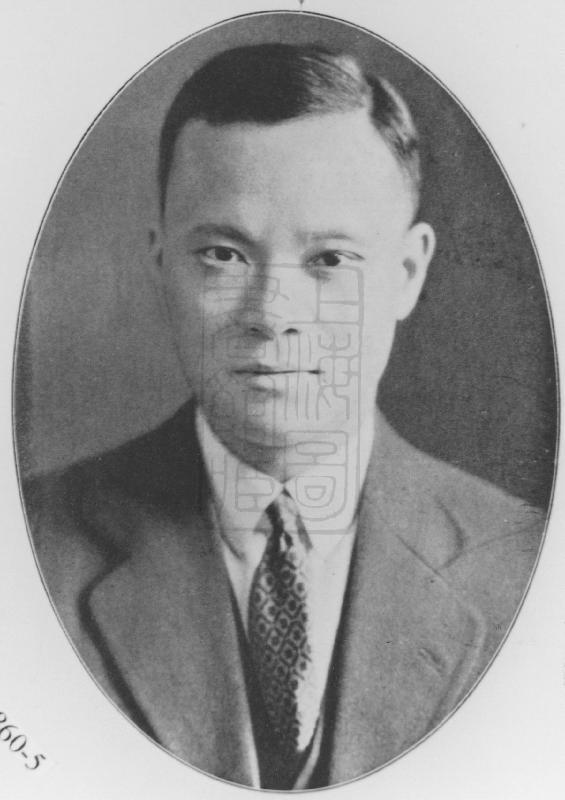
- Born: 1891; Nanchang, Jiangxi, Qing Empire
- Died: 25 January 1945
- Education: Baoding Military Academy
- Occupations: Military general, police officer, politician
- Political party: Kuomintang
- Relatives: Zhang Dinghuang
- Military career
- Allegiance: Republic of China
- Rank: General

Zhang Dingfan, (Chinese: 张定璠; 1891 – 25 January 1945) alternate name Zhang Boxuan 张伯璇, was a Chinese military general, police officer, and politician who cut his teeth during the 1911 Revolution in Wuchang and successively rose to the rank of General throughout the various civil wars of the 1920s to the Japanese invasion of World War II.

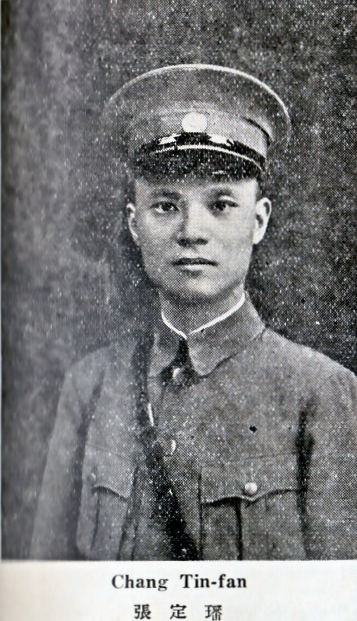

== Biography ==
=== Early career ===
Zhang Dingfan was born in 1891 in Nanchang city in Jiangxi Province (江西南昌) to a merchant family. At 17 in 1908, he enrolled in the Jiangxi Army Survey Academy. In 1911 followed by his brother Zhang Dinghuang. He shortly left the Academy to join the Wuchang Uprising, catalyst for the Xinghai 1911 Revolution. He joined a "Fearless troop" or "Dare to Die troop" (敢死队). Following the success of the Revolution, he returned to study at the Wuchang Military Institute and graduated from the affiliated Baoding Officer Academy, to be commissioned as a company commander in the Jiangxi 4th Army. In 1918 he partook in a long campaign which successfully dislodged the highly renowned and ambitious warload General Sun Quanfang 孙传芳 and was appointed to the general staff of the 4th army.

=== The campaigns ===
In 1919 he was appointed to the General Staff of the 1st Route Army in Guangdong Province. In 1922 he again saw action as part of the Northern Expedition and became Chief of the General Staff and Commander of the 7th Regiment. This army marched into Jiangxi and Fujian, defeating Li Houji 李厚基. Zhang next assumed command of the Guangxi 1st Division. In 1925, Zhang Dingfan headed the Whampoa Military Academy Administrative office. He then became the chief of the general staff for the Northern Expedition in 1926. He was appointed mayor of Nanchang as well as chief of the Provincial Police forces. In 1927 he was appointed to head the 13th Army in the 3rd Military District as well as Mayor of Shanghai.

Zhang attended Shanghai's National Product's Movement Week events of 7–13 July 1928. Zhang resigned from his positions in 1929 for reasons of health.

He returned in 1937 as the Japanese Invasion accelerated and became the First Deputy Head of the Nationalist Military Affairs Commission. Zhang was promoted to Major General in 1939. He was en route to the U.S. for treatment of bladder cancer and died in Casablanca January 25, 1945. He was posthumously awarded the rank of full General.

== Background ==
=== Bai Circle ===
Zhang Dingfan belonged to the circle of General Bai Zongxi 白崇禧. While the 1911 Revolution overthrew the Qing Empire, it did not unify China which was ruled by regional warlords. The central national government was in the south, home of Sun Yat-Sen. It did not have the military strength to defeat all of the warlords, especially those in the North. The regional forces were constantly shifting allegiances or fighting each other. Bai was from Central China which included Jiangxi, Zhang's home province. Bai eventually joined with Chiang Kai-shek who became head of the Nationalist Government. It was an uneasy alliance of convenience. Nevertheless, Bai's armies were critical in the success of Chiang's two Northern Expeditions forming the left and center of the advances. Zhang was a field general they both depended upon and was rewarded to be the Mayor of Shanghai while remaining in command of the 13th Army in the heart of China.

=== Resignation and Re-appointment ===
After the success of his Northern Expeditions which gave him control of the governments of the northern provinces, Chiang Kai-shek proceeded to "Cleanse the Nationalist Party" 清党. Communist members infiltrated the Nationalist party over the years. They also maintained a military power base as well as local headquarters in all major cities. Chiang understood a ruthless campaign to root them out. Bai had friends amongst them. Zhang helped one of them escape from Shanghai and resigned shortly afterwards in 1929.

There were many instances of commanders who helped their friends when the politics changed. Even the most powerful among them overlooked this during the internecine warfare. The attitude was different concerning the war with Japan. When that war began in ernest, Chiang Kai-shek recalled Zhang to the Military Affairs Commission and promoted him as well.

Xhang died in 1945.
