= Rare Book Preservation Society =

Chinese book preservation group during WW2

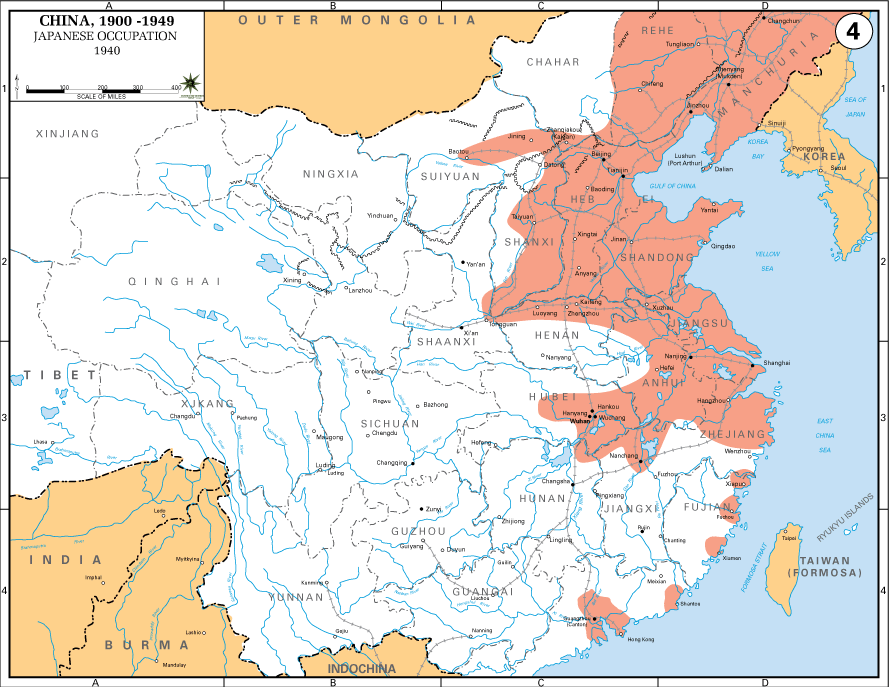
Areas under Japanese Occupation in 1940

The Rare Book Preservation Society (文献保存同志会) was founded in 1940 by Zheng Zhenduo (郑振铎), Zhang Shouyong (张寿镛), He Bingsong (何炳松), Zhang Yuanji (张元济), Zhang Fengju (张凤举), and Chung-Chang Shen (沈仲章）for the purpose of secretly acquiring and preserving rare books and manuscripts in the Shanghai Jiangnan region. These cultural assets have been accumulated by a number of famous private libraries some over 1,000 years.

They faced Japanese looting and forced sale under duress. In less than two years, the Society succeeded in saving over 130,000 volumes in the lands controlled by the Japanese. One hundred thirty crates were sent to Hong Kong (then a British colony) for safekeeping. Despite their best efforts, the entire collection was looted anyway when the Japanese later overran Hong Kong. Fortunately, after WWII and the Japanese surrender, Zhang Fengju 张凤举 (fluent in French, English and Japanese) was sent to Japan in April 1946 and recovered the collection after working closely with the U.S. Occupation forces in Tokyo. These were successively shipped back to Shanghai for the National Central Library 中央图书馆 in Taiwan.

== Background and events ==
After the attack on Pearl Harbor in 1940, the full scale Japanese invasion of China began. They controlled the entire coast of China except technically for the French Concessions (under Vichy control).

Former Banque de l'Indochine building on The Bund, Shanghai

(Background note:

The great Jiangnan private libraries were formed over many generations. These rare books and manuscripts were not only threatened by wartime destruction but owners of these libraries felt pressured to sell due to financial needs. Agents for Japanese institutions and organizations such as Harvard Yenching had the goal of buying the cream of the crop. In his memoirs 求书日录, Zheng Zhenduo wrote:

"I discussed the situation many times with those scholars still remaining in Shanghai such as Zhang Jusheng 张菊生、Zhang Yongni 张咏霓、He Bingsong 何炳松、Zhang Fengju 张凤举 and others. We felt that this aggressive preservation 抢救 activity must commence immediately. We could not stand to see these rare books and manuscripts acquired by the Japanese or be exported. We jointly sent several telegrams to Chungking requesting government help to rescue and preserve this national cultural treasure."

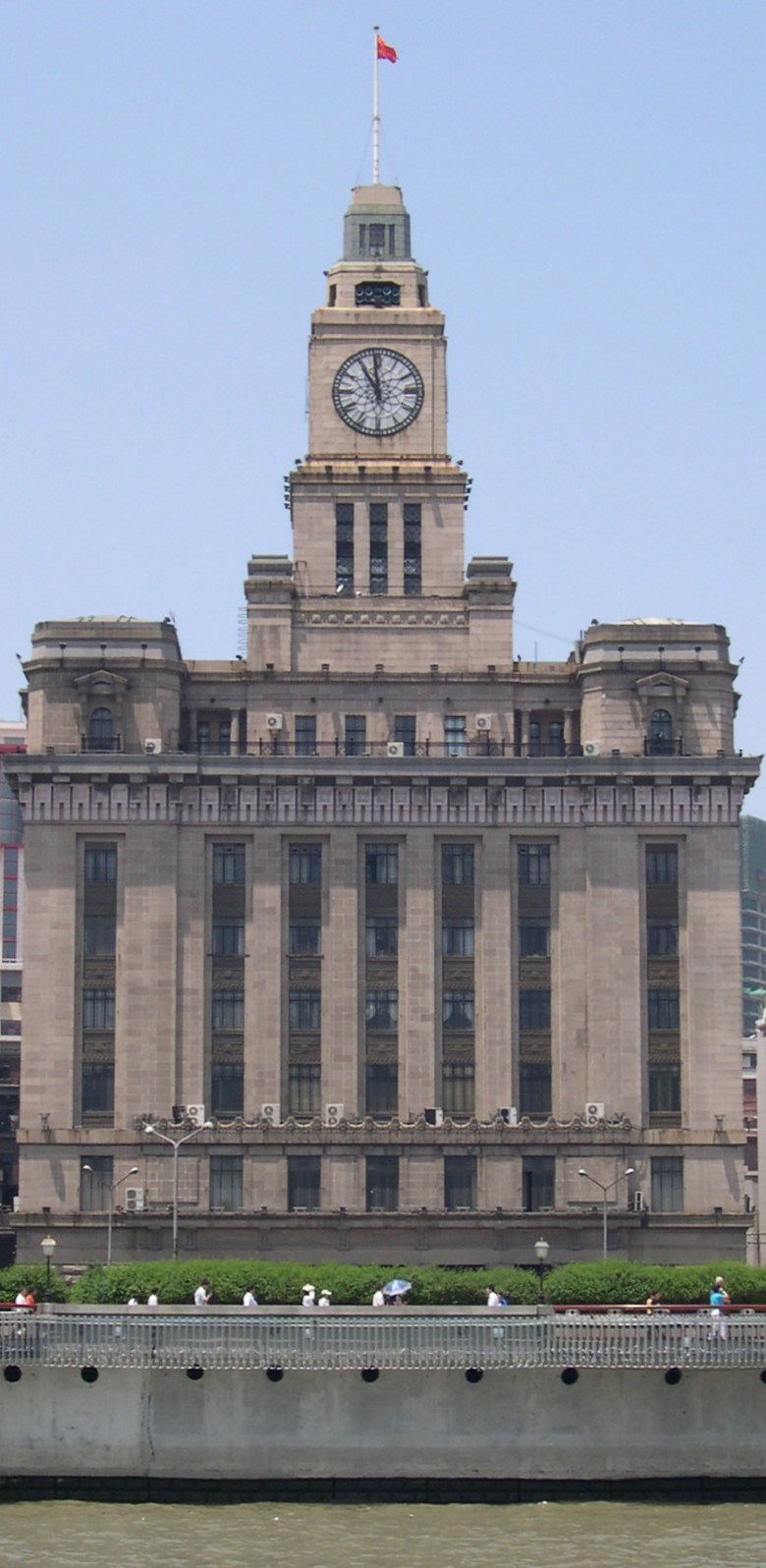
Shanghai Customs House on The Bund

According to Jiang Fucong's memoirs 蒋复璁 珍帚斋文集, "Joint telegrams from Shanghai scholars to the Education Ministry and the British Boxer Indemnity Fund directors requested prompt help to acquire and save these books and manuscripts. Zhu Jiahua 朱家骅 was Chairman of the Fund at the time. He felt that the opportunity must not be lost and suggested using the projected construction funds of the National Central Library supplemented by the Boxer Fund. The Minister of Education Chen Lifu 陈立夫 wholeheartedly offered to help. To avoid Japanese detection, the secret "Rare Book Preservation Society" was formed by 5 scholars: Zheng Zhenduo 郑振铎, Zhang Shouyong 张寿镛, He Bingsong 何炳松, Zhang Yuanji 张元济, and Zhang Fengju 张凤举. The Society's acquisitions took place from April 1940 to June 1941, south in Suzhou-Hangzhou to the north in Beijing. During this time, Zheng Zheduo wrote nine reports to Jiang Fucong. Zhen was no doubt the leader of all this underground activity. Others contributed according to their expertise. For example, Zhang Fengju liaised with the Jiayetang 嘉业堂 and Siyuan 适园 libraries as well as part of the authentication efforts. The Nationalist government gave this priority and the Education Ministry issued secret directive 18543 with the seal of Minister Chen empowering the Society's work. Altogether 130,000 books were acquired for the National Central Library by the Society.

== Progress reports ==
Of the reports by Chang Feng-chu and Zheng Zhenduo, one page from each report is displayed on the Rare Books, National Central Library website about this activity.

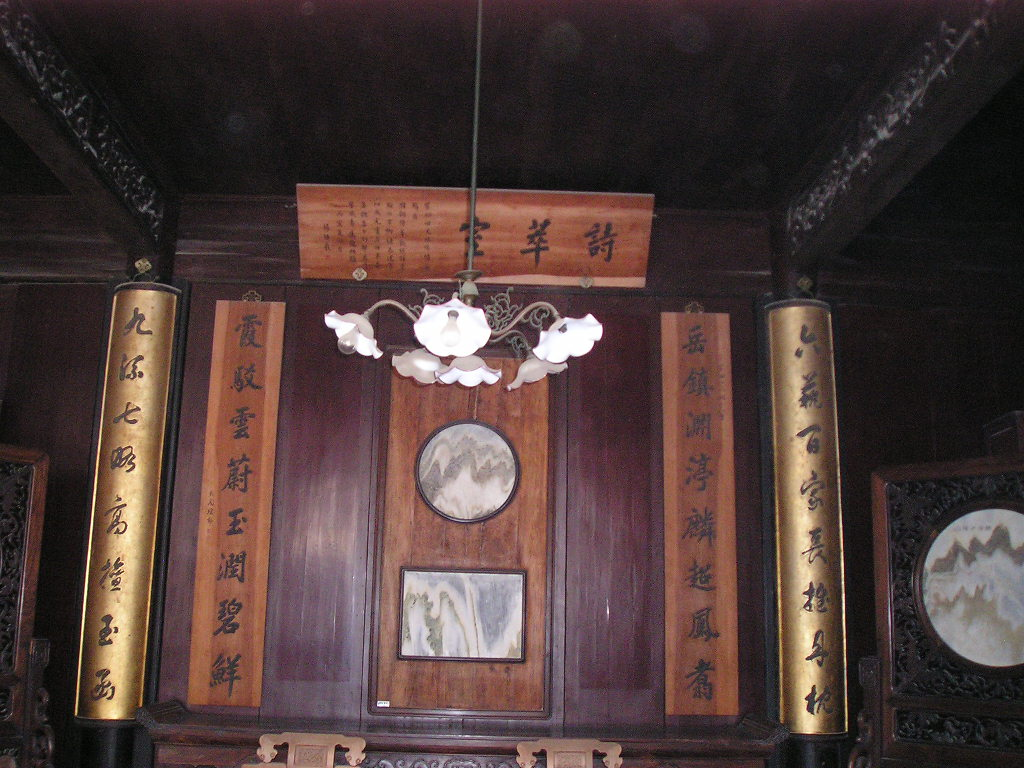
Jiayetang Library (嘉业堂藏书楼)

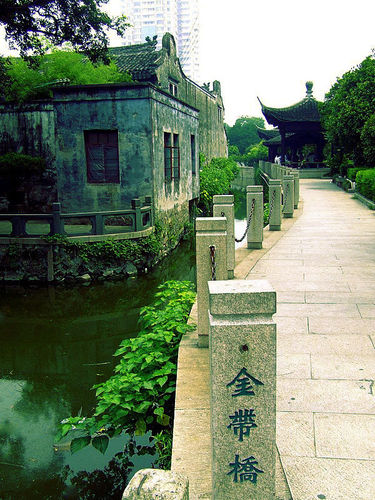
Yuehaitang Library (玉海堂藏书楼)

- 1st Report: summarizes activities from the beginning of February, including 75 groups of fine rare books from the Liu family's Yuehaitang 玉海堂, 780 from the Hangzhou Hu family, 220 some from Song family consisting of seal script books, 12 from Zhang Congyue 张葱玉 family consisting of Songjiang handwritten Han manuscripts, 20 from Tieqingtonjian Pavilion 铁琴铜剑楼 consisting of Yuan Ming dynasty 元明 printed books and handwritten book proofs 抄校本书.
- 2nd report: relates that the Japanese enemy bought two important collections for 600,000 and 400,000 yuan respectively; and that this must not happen in South China. Also that Harvard earmarked US$60,000. for its agents to acquire rare books.
- 3rd report: concerns a private goal of the society members to acquire a number of "Annotated Bibliography of the Four Treasuries" 四库存目 (This is a compendium of all known books compiled in the 17th century under the direction of the Kangxi Emperor. It was updated a number of times as new editions.) The report also describes the seals to be placed on the first 希古右文 and last page 不薄今人爱古人 of each book.
- 4th report: tells about the dangers of sending letters by mail. Suggested a method of coding for written communications disguised as a commercial transaction.
- 5th report: suggests that after repeated viewing, the Society considers their goal should be the Liu and Zhang libraries. The latter has countless important Song, Yuan and hand-copied books and manuscripts. The going market price would be around 100,000 yuan. They must not be allowed to be dispersed or exported. The Liu collection highlights are in the Ming fine books, especially many rarely seen unique historic records. It also includes unprinted Qing handwritten proofs.
- 6th report: recent decisions after discussing with Xu Senyue 徐森玉 to set the following goals, a) unique manuscripts, b) unprinted proofs, c) rare manuscripts, d) forbidden texts 禁毁书, e) "Complete Library of the Four Treasuries" compendium 四库存目. The principles are to conserve financial capital, concentrate on quality and not quantity.
- 7th report: reflects that the books acquired so far have been directly from the owners. The prices have been reasonable. However, market prices have been increasing precipitously and that future prices will be undoubtedly higher.
- 8th report: concerns the purchase of the Jiayetang library and some of its details.
- 9th report: writes that individual acquisition activities have stopped.

== Activity results ==
The Rare Book Preservation Society was organized in January 1940. It began the secret activities immediately and continued until December 1941 when full-scale Japanese invasion began and their military took over the administration of the Vichy French Concession in Shanghai. In this span of two years, they acquired 4,864 groups of books and texts consisting of 48,000 volumes, as recorded in Zhang Fengju's diaries. These included the choice from the Chang family Siyuan 张氏适园, Liu family Jiayetang 刘氏嘉业堂, Deng family Dengbilou 江宁邓氏群碧楼, Shen family Hairilou 嘉兴沈氏海日楼, Ju family Tieqingtonjian Pavilion 常熟瞿氏铁琴铜剑楼.

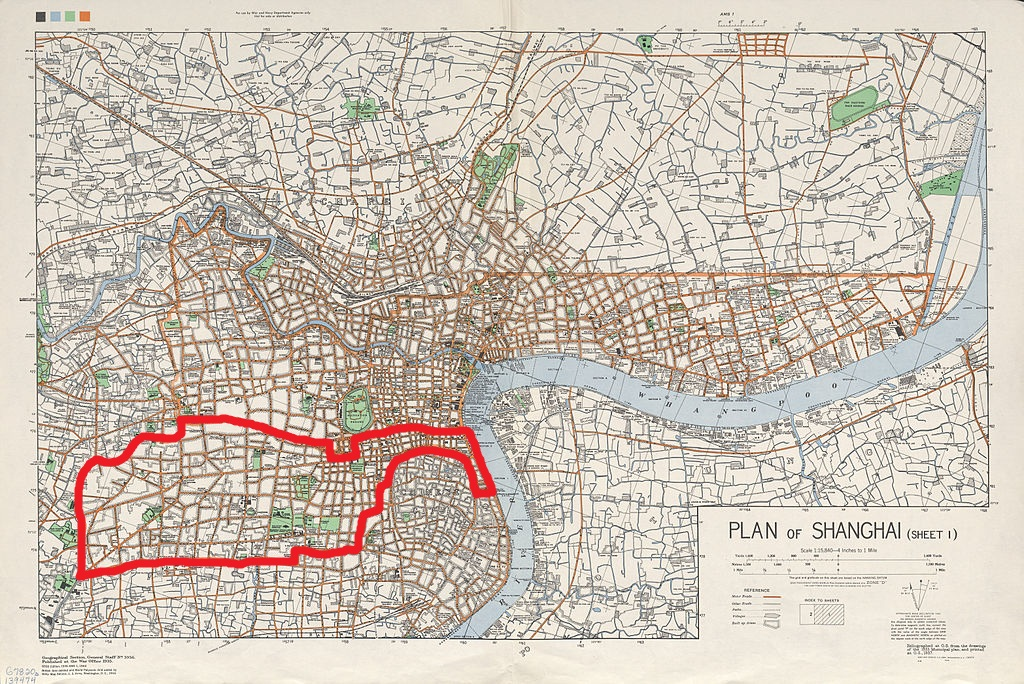
Former French Concession in Shanghai with direct access to port

(Background note: Before the Japanese occupation administration with its Japanese military police, the French Concession was technically under the French. Vichy France was an Axis powers "ally" of Japan. Thus, the Shanghai French Concession was administered by the French. They deployed a large of French Indochina 安南 policemen for example. The less visible civil administration was largely Chinese with a few French at the top. This included the import/export processing and the post office. Shanghai was still a port of call for French Ships. The Japanese military technically could not officially go into the Concession. All this facilitated the shipments to Hong Kong since the local government adopted a relaxed attitude).

Current research does not agree upon the total number of books acquired. Due to wartime conditions and the physical moves of the library, the records are incomplete and scattered. The lowest number is 40–50,000 individual books. The most widely accepted number is over 100,000. The National Central Library Rare Books Collection lists 130,000. It was a huge book acquisition undertaking under difficult time and physical constraints.

The books were successively shipped in crates to Hong Kong (a British Colony at the time) for safekeeping. The Japanese overran the colony after the Pearl Harbor incident and looted the entire crated collection, shipping it to Tokyo.

== Sequel after WWII ==
Key members of the Society assumed different roles in the Chinese government in 1945. Zhu Jiahua 朱家骅 became Minister of Education and sent Zhang Fengju 张凤举 to Japan April 1946 as part of the Occupation Mission to recover this collection among others. Since he took part in the original acquisition and was fluent in Japanese, English, and French, it took less than a week to identify and locate the main collection in the Ueno Imperial Library. He knew the Japanese cataloger as well. And by December, it was on its way to Shanghai. These sequel events are in the handwritten diaries of Zhang now in the National Central Library.

== Li Bai Tang poem ==
This is an example of the rare manuscripts and books in the collection. An image above is a screenshot of a unique 17th-century proof manuscript of the Tang Poems 唐诗 for use by the Kangxi era imperial editing committee of the Complete Library of the Four Treasuries 四庫全書 compendium. The image below shows a partial page from the printed Kangxi imperial edition of Tang anthology, a part of the printed collection. The poem "Contemplation of Moonlight" 静夜思 is by Li Bai 李白, 701-762 a.d. He was in exile and pining for his homeland. Li Bai was a master in the use of vivid imagery. Here the cool moonbeam and frost emphasize the coolness in his heart as he thinks of his homeland. Every schoolchild used to learn this poem by heart.

Li Bai Poem 李白 静夜思 "Contemplating Moonlight"	Image of Kangxi edition page
Moonlight before my bed Perhaps frost on the ground. Lift my head and see the moon Lower my head and pine for home. 床前看月光，疑是地上霜。 抬头望山月，低头思故乡。	Kangxi Edition Siku LiBai Moonlight Poem (康熙版四库全书静夜思)

Notes: This is an old Chinese printing format. Each vertical line of the poem text is in large characters. Beneath each line is an annotation about the line. These are in half size characters so that there are two lines of notes beneath each line of the poem. For the first line of the poem, there are two notes below. The notes refer to two earlier poems about the same subject by two ancient emperor poets. (While they were good with letters, they were known as 昏君 or oblivious rulers. Both died to successful rebellions.) Chinese poets often compose verses that use the same subject matter as others, sometimes even with the same names. In this competition, Li Bai's few words far outstrip his imperial competition.

Some additional background points:

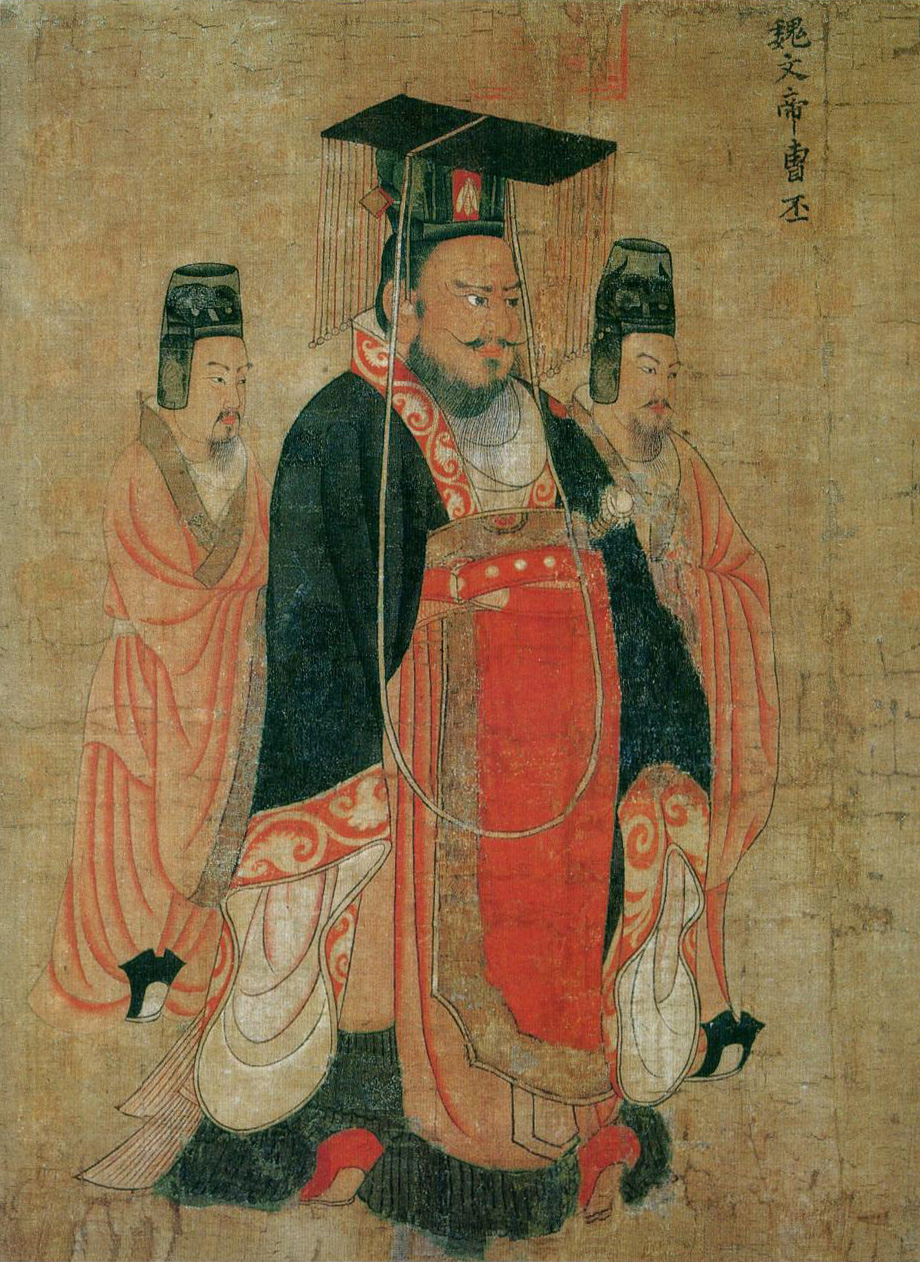
Wei dynasty emperor Wendi (魏文帝)

1. Annotation note quotes a Wei dynasty poem by Emperor WenDi (187-226 AD) about the moonlight on his bed.
2. Annotation note quotes a Liang dynasty emperor YuanDi (508–554)about moonlight.
3. Different editions may have slight differences in words. This edition has one or two words that are different from most contemporary editions. The words here are thought to be the original; in the Ming dynasty it was common practice to alter poetry to contain the dynasty's name 明 míng.
4. The book "Complete Library of the Four Treasuries" is a compendium of "all" Chinese printed matter compiled by order of the Kangxi Emperor. Over 300 scholars convened in Beijing for this effort of about 20 years.
5. This is a partial page, the first 2 full lines of the poem are shown. Old Chinese text is read top to bottom in a vertical line and vertical lines from right to left.
