= Deng Conghao =

Chinese chemist and educator

Deng Conghao (Chinese: 邓从豪; pinyin: Dèng Cóngháo; 1920–1998) was a Chinese chemist and educator. He served as President of Shandong University from June 1984 until November 1986.

Academic offices
Preceded by Wu Fuheng	President of Shandong University; 1984–1986	Succeeded by Pan Chengdong
