= Sinking (novella) =

Novella by Yu Dafu

- Cover of a 1926 edition
- Author: Yu Dafu
- Language: Chinese
- Genre: Fiction
- Published: October 1921
- Publication place: China
- OCLC: 729014234

Cover of a 1930 edition

Sinking (simplified Chinese: 沉沦; traditional Chinese: 沉淪; pinyin: Chénlún) is a novella written by Yu Dafu. The story was completed in Tokyo in 1921 and later published in a collection named Sinking in Shanghai the same year. It is among the first generation of modern Chinese fictions telling psychological stories. The frank expression of sexuality and innovative emphasis on subjectivity of the protagonist is one of the reasons for Sinking's status as romantic, representative of May Fourth literature.

According to Janet Ng, "Sinking" focuses on the sexual anguish of a Chinese student in Japan and his grief over the country's weakness. Due to several overlapping experiences of the author and the protagonist in Japan, it can be reasonably inferred that Yu Dafu's personal experiences provide materials for the autobiographical story.

== Plot summary ==
The protagonist is a melancholic Chinese male student who is in exile in Japan. The hypocrisy and sensitivity in his personality led to his gradual isolation from both the Japanese students and Chinese fellows. Despite his constant longing for interpersonal connection, he decides to live a solitary life in the company of nature to read literature. Chasing a solitary life, he moves to N. City and finds a more remote cottage to settle in.

The protagonist's sexual desire is related to the national shame of Chinese students coming from a backward and weak country. On one hand, he looks forward to taking revenge on the Japanese and holds nostalgia for his homeland. On the other hand, he feels uncomfortable when facing Japanese women, such as the two Japanese students, the hotel owner's daughter, and the Japanese prostitute in the brothel by the sea. His sexual desire and inner conflict between individualism and collectivism lead to his demise. Eventually, driven by sexual impulse and expectation to return to the collective, he visits a brothel and ultimately sinks himself in the sea.

== Writing Background ==
=== Historical background ===
The novella was first published in 1921, when Chinese history was still semi-colonial and semi-feudal. Japan's national modernization formed a contrast with Chinese's national shame of being invaded. At that time, China was a country that had been invaded by foreign powers. In the eyes of the Japanese, the status of the Chinese students were naturally low. During this chaotic period, Chinese intellectuals felt that the Western model of modernization and ethnic unity of Chinese people were in conflict. In other words, the ideas of iconoclasm and nationalism are irreconcilable. On the other hand, the 1920s Chinese literature also received the influence of Western literature's naturalism. The 1920s Chinese literary works were characterized by a similar concurrence between the writer or protagonist's individual struggles, and the nation's dilemma. Chinese intellectuals further transformed the self-revelation function of naturalism into a national awakening one. In the context of this era, the relationship between sexuality and nationalism depicted by Yu Dafu is rather paradoxical. Therefore, throughout the article, the author expects China to become "rich and strong".

=== Linguistic background ===
In the late 19th and early 20th centuries, unifying language used to be an important project in order to construct China's nationhood. Right before the publication of "Sinking," due to various Chinese dialects that hindered the communication of Chinese writers with their audience and traditional Chinese that was unable to meet the requirement of modernization, Chinese intellectuals were urged to find a “modern medium of communication” to end this linguistic instability in China. From 1920 onwards, individual creation and expression gradually took interpersonal communication’s place as the concern of language reform. The object of reform also changed into grammar and European sentence structure. However, the purpose of the unification of people remained unchanged. Western literature became a new source of “elements common to human condition” for Chinese intellectuals. Therefore, "Sinking" is considered to carry “a social, historical and cultural intention” of the author.

== Notable quotes ==
- “This, then, is your refuge. When all the philistines envy you, sneer at you, and treat you like a fool, only Nature, only this eternally bright sun and azure sky, this late summer breeze, this early autumn air still remains your friend, still remains your mother and your beloved. With this, you have no further need to join the world of the shallow and flippant. You might as well spend the rest of your life in this simple countryside, in the bosom of Nature.”
- “English poetry is English poetry and Chinese poetry is Chinese poetry; why bother to translate?”
- “I want neither knowledge nor fame. All I want is a ‘heart’ that can understand and comfort me, a warm and passionate heart and the sympathy that it generates and the love born of that sympathy!”
- “Stamping his feet lightly, he advanced, gnashing his teeth and clenching his fists, as if preparing to declare war on these young waitresses.”
- “He took a walk by the seashore. From afar the lights on the fishermen’s boats seemed to be beckoning him, like the will-o’-the-wisp, and the waves under the silvery moonlight seemed to be winking at him like the eyes of mountain spirits. Suddenly he had an inexplicable urge to drown himself in the sea.”
- “O China, my China, you are the cause of my death!... I wish you could become rich and strong soon!... Many, many of your children are still suffering.”

== In English Translation ==
- Yu, Dafu. Sinking. Trans. Joseph S.M. Lau and C.T. Hsia. 1995. Print.
- Yu, Dafu. Drowning (aka Sinking). Trans. Richard Robinson, Sunny Lou Publishing, 2021.

== See also ==
- New Culture Movement
