= Zheng Zhenduo =

Chinese writer (1898–1958)

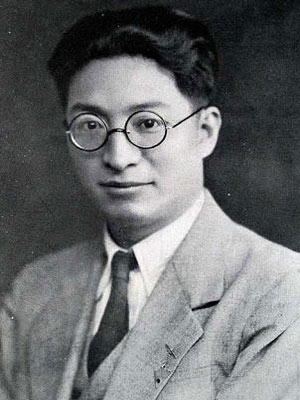
- Traditional Chinese: 鄭振鐸
- Simplified Chinese: 郑振铎
Transcriptions
Standard Mandarin
- Hanyu Pinyin: Zhèng Zhènduó
- Wade–Giles: Cheng Chen-to

Xidi (courtesy name)
- Traditional Chinese: 西諦
- Simplified Chinese: 西谛
Transcriptions
Standard Mandarin
- Hanyu Pinyin: Xīdì
- Wade–Giles: Hsi-ti

Zheng Zhenduo (December 19, 1898 – October 17, 1958) (Note: His pen names were Baofen (寶芬), Guo Yuanxin (郭源新) and CT. His courtesy name was Xidi.) was a Chinese journalist, writer, archaeologist and scholar. He was also the first director of the Palace Museum at the Forbidden City.

He made a significant contribution towards the establishment of the Chinese literature and the editing of a variety of literary magazines. In 1921, he, Mao Dun, Jiang Baili, Geng Jizhi (耿濟之), and others organized the Literary Study Society (文學研究會; Wenxue yanjiu hui). In 1923, he became the chief editor of Fiction Monthly. In addition, he in succession participated in editing Min Chao (閩潮), Xin Shehui (新社會), Wenxue Xunkan (文學旬刊). In late 1931, he became a professor at both Yenching University and Tsinghua University. He also became the president of Faculty of Arts and the director of Chinese department of Jinan University. He was also the chief editor of The World's Library (世界文庫; Shijie Wenku) at the same time.

After the establishment of the People's Republic of China, he was assigned to be head of the Cultural Relic Bureau (文物局), Director of the Institute of Archaeology of the Chinese Academy of Sciences and literary research institute, the assistant minister of cultural department, committee member of State Council scientific program committee and Chinese Academy of Science philosophical social sciences, the vice-chairman of Chinese folk literature and art research council, etc.

On 17 October 1958, Zheng led national cultural delegates to visit Arabia and Afghanistan. He died in the Tupolev Tu-104 crash in Kanash, Chuvashia, Soviet Union.

== Early life ==
=== Family ===
Zheng Zhenduo was born on 19 December 1898 in Yongjia, Zhejiang Province. His ancestral home was in Changle, Fujian province. He was born in a poor family. Together with two younger sisters, he was raised by his mother because his father and grandfather died when he was still a teenager.

He was named "Zhenduo" (振鐸) by his grandfather. "Zhen" (振) denotes arousing an action and "Duo" (鐸) is a kind of big bell. His grandfather wanted him to ring like a great bell to summon and to arouse people. In addition, his grandfather gave him the childhood name "Mu Guan" (木官; lit. 'Wooden official').

=== Schooling ===
In 1917, Zheng began studying at the Beijing Railway Management School and graduated in March 1921. Beyond classroom, he read a lot of books and developed an enormous interest in social sciences, Chinese literature and Western literature and thus developed a critical mind. During the May Fourth Movement, he was a student representative, spreading the news of student movements in Beijing. In 1919, he helped publish two magazines called "New Society" (新社會; Xin Shehui) and "National Salvation Speeches Weekly" (救國講演周報; Jiuguo jiangyan zhoubao).

In January 1921, Zheng Zhenduo and twelve others, including Mao Dun and Ye Shengtao founded the earliest literary society of the New Literature Movement, Literary Research Association (文學研究會; Wenxue yanjiu hui; also known as the "Literary Association"), which advocated realism and opposed art for art's sake.

== Early career ==
Zheng had been a journalist, a modern writer, archeology and a literature scholar throughout his life.

In May 1921, he helped set up a drama society called "Demotic Opera Troupe" (民眾戲劇社; Minzhong Xiju She) with Mao Dun, Ye Shengtao, Chen Dabei, Ouyang Yuqian, Xiong Foxi and other writers. They published a monthly magazine named Drama (戲劇; Xiju) on 31 May in the same year.

In 1922, Zheng established the first magazine for children, Children's World (兒童世界). In January 1923, he became the chief editor of a monthly magazine of novel, Fiction Monthly. After the May 30 Incident in 1925, he helped founding a newspaper called Gongli Ribao (公理日報). From then on, he wrote many books including Zhongguo Wenxue Shi (中國文學史; lit. 'History of Chinese Literature') and 1943 Diary (1943年日記).

Zheng had been a scholar giving lectures in universities, a researcher of the academy and a journalist since 1931. He taught in the Department of Chinese in Yenching University, in Jinan University from 1935 to 1941 as the Dean of faculty of Arts and in Peking University since 1953. After 1949, he became the Vice-Minister of Culture and the Head of the Cultural Relics Bureau.

=== Journalism ===
Zheng started his journalistic career in the 1920s during the May Fourth Movement. Together with some classmates including Zhong Tao (仲陶), he got a first taste of editing in starting a publication named Jiuguo Jiangyan Zhoukan (救國講演周刊). The magazine - being published in Wenzhou for only 6 to 7 times - was closed by the authorities since it enraged a government official.

As one of the founders of a youth magazine, Xin Shehui (新社會), Zheng aimed to criticize the Beijing government. Its first publication was on 1 November 1919, and it consisted of four pages. The aims of the magazine were to:

1. advocate the social service
2. discuss society problems
3. introduce social theories
4. research on common people education
5. record society matters
6. criticize society shortcomings
7. narrate society real states
8. report news of the organization

Zheng gave many speeches about the student movement in Beijing. On top of criticizing, he wanted to make good use of the New Culture Movement to publicize and promote new social ideals for the Chinese future development. Chen Duxiu suggested that Xin Shehui could be edited with a more approachable style which could be acceptable to the general public. The magazine was finally published on 1 November 1919 throughout China, arousing tides of attention from the public, especially amongst the young readers. However, as Zheng and his co-editors were still inexperienced in editing by that time, the magazine was thought to be immature in editing and too sloganeered. On the hand, the content of the magazine upset the military side of the government. Thus, in one month's time, the government called the publication to a halt.

In November 1920, Zheng established the Literary Study Society (文學研究會; Wenxue Yanjiu Hui) with Mao Dun and Ye Shengtao. In January 1923, he took over the position of chief editor of Fiction Monthly from Mao Dun. He was the chief editor on and off for nearly 9 years. He advocated a literary advocacy of "Blood and Tears" and supported a writing style of realism.

In June 1925, he founded a newspaper called Kongli Ribao (公理日報) with Wu Yuzhi and Ye Shengtao in Shanghai. This newspaper was aimed at criticizing the "May Thirtieth Incident" and the rising foreign imperialism in China.

Also, he contributed in various newspapers like Jiuguo Jiangyan Zhoubao (救國講演周報) and Xinxue Bao (新學報) to awaken Chinese people from old traditions. These articles mainly focused on social issues and the evil deeds of the old traditional practices. Zheng wrote articles from different aspects like the liberation of women, morality, social psychology and the liberation of political power. They all advocated more people to rethink the old values position.

=== Exile to France ===
In April 1927, Chiang Kai-shek launched a sudden attack on thousands of suspected Communists in the area he controlled. Many innocent students and movement activists were killed. Writers, including Zheng, were under political pressure and he left his family for France in May 1927. During the years living in Paris, he mailed his diary to his wife; this was published as a book named Diary of Travels in Europe (歐行日記; Ouxing Riji).

=== Return to China ===
He continued his journalistic career after coming back to China in 1929 and founded Jiuwang Ribao (救亡日報). In October 1945, he founded a weekly magazine called Democracy (民主) to oppose the civil war and Chiang Kai-shek's pro-American policy.

== Cultural Preservation ==
Due to the invasion of Japanese troops, Shanghai was besieged starting from 1937 and many significant cultural assets were lost. In the light of this, Zheng devoted himself to the rescue and protection of aged Chinese documents and antiques. Chen was a founding member of the Shanghai "Rare Book Preservation Society" and its leader. Disguising himself as a staff member in a stationery store, named Chan Sixun (陳思訓), he managed to save many aged books from damage or loss to the outside world. He also worked with the writer Lu Xin and Rongbao Zhai publishing to collect decorative writing paper in the style of ancient wood-block colour printing; he later ensured that Rongbao Zhai was preserved for the future.

As part of his work with the Cultural Relics Bureau, he worked to rebuild the Palace Museum, including traveling to Hong Kong to bring back exhibits which had been sent there for safekeeping during the war, such as the 4th century works of Wang Xun's Bo Yuan tie (grass script calligraphy) and Wang Xianzhi's Zhongqiu tie.

Zheng believed in the importance of preserving historical relics and making them accessible to the public.

After his death, his wife donated 7,000 books to the National Library of China.

== Contribution to literature ==
=== Translation ===
Zheng was proficient in foreign languages including English, Russian, Indian languages, Greek and Latin. He translated several pieces of Russian and Indian literature.

Zheng had started translation of Russian literature since early 20s. His works included the works, paper and preface of Turgenev (1818–1883), Gogol (1809–1852), Chekov (1860–1904), Gorky (1868–1936) and Tolstoy (1828–1910).

Zheng translated many pieces of Indian literature, including the poems and ancient fables of Rabindranath Tagore. In October 1922, he published his translation of Stray Birds (飛鳥集). In August 1925, he published The Indian Fable (印度寓言). There were 55 translation works of his in total.

He also translated several of Henry David Thoreau's works into Chinese.

Zheng studied Greek and Roman literature and in 1929, he published The Story of Love (戀愛的故事), later translating Heroes of Greek and Roman Mythology (希臘羅馬神話傳說中的英雄傳說). In 1935, he published a book called Greek Mythology (希臘神話), an analysis of Ancient Greek mythology. In a second edition of Greek Mythology published after the creation of the People's Republic, his introduction included Karl Marx's well-known A Contribution to the Critique of Political Economy.

=== Literature Union ===
As the previous newspapers and magazines were banned by the government, Zheng believed that a properly established literature union would make things run easier. In January 1921, he established Wenxue Yanjiu Hui (Literary Study Society 文學研究會), which literally means literature research union, with Mao Dun, Ye Shengtao and 12 other people in the related field.

The Union's first publication was Wenxue Xunkan (文學旬刊). It was published along with the well-known newspaper called Shishi Xinbao (Current events newspaper 時事新報). He revealed the goal of the publication and the literature views of the union. He believed that literature is important and capable of influencing society. It was not merely an era, a place, or one's reflection, but it acted as a frontier, which could affect the morality of human beings. Also, he strongly opposed the old style of Chinese literature of setting leisure and religion as main themes. He supported the writing of life - one theme in the new realism literature approach.

He also expressed his view on the development of Chinese literature. As the connection between Chinese literature and the world's literature was far too little, the Chinese lofty spirit could not be shared by the rest of the world. He treated that as the Chinese's greatest humiliation. Therefore, he was so devoted to the field of literature, eager to strive for a higher position for Chinese literature in the world. Under the influence of the May Fourth Movement, he thought that the major responsibility of Chinese literature was to inspire youngsters' revolutionary mission in order to strengthen the power of China.

=== Realism ===
Within the May Fourth movement, he adhered the direction of realism for New literature era. He thought literature liked 'mirror of a life'. This means his writing mostly revealed the real faces of societies. He also placed a lot of emphasis on the importance of creative living. During his long composing and researching career, he showed a fully comprehensive realism of literature. He thought that literature must contribute to "life":

We need the "blood" of literature, "tears" of literature. Both of them will become the trend of Chinese literature; the writing consists of not only "blood" and "tears", but also consists of "literature"; the "blood" and "tears" experience and feeling of author are aesthetic for success in writing.

Literature should consist of the highest ideal of the author, which form the soul of the article, in order to make it meaningful to the readers and the whole of society.

=== Classical literature ===
Starting from the late 1920s, Zheng taught Chinese literature History in universities. At that time, he did much in making research in Chinese classical writing. He used his pen name, Bao Fun, to write Yuenqu Xulu (元曲敍錄) in the Novel Monthly (小說月報) and finished editing The History of the Chinese Literature (中國文學史) in 1930.

=== Romanticism ===
Zheng put heavy emphasis on emotional elements in literature, highlighting its importance in distinguishing between literature and science. He advocated that literature functions to instill a passion in the readers' heart. One example was the historical novel, Arrest of the Fire Stealer (取火者的逮捕).

== Works ==
=== Academic ===
- 《中國古代木刻畫選集》 (Zhongguo gu dai mu ke hua xuan ji) (Selected ancient Chinese woodcuts)
- 《文學大綱》 (Wen xue da gang) (Outline of literature)
- 《插圖本中國文學史》 (Cha tu ben Zhongguo wen xue shi) (Illustrated history of Chinese literature)
- 《中國俗文學史》 (Zhongguo su wen xue shi) (History of Chinese popular literature)
- 《中國文學論集》 (Zhongguo wen xue lun ji) (Essays on Chinese literature)
- 《俄國文學史略》 (Eguo wen xue shi lüe) (Brief history of Russian literature)
- 《佝僂集》 (Goulou ji) (Rickets)
- 《西諦書話》 (Xidi shu hua) (Xidi on books)
- 《鄭振鐸文集》 (Zheng Zhenduo wen ji) (Collected works of Zheng Zhenduo)
- 《談〈金瓶梅詞話〉》 (Tan Jin Ping Mei Cihua) (On Plum in the Golden Vase)
- 《編輯方針與編輯計劃》 (Bianji fangzhen yu bianji jihua) (Editing: policy and plan)
- Zheng Zhenduo wenbo wenji (Anthology of Zheng's writings on cultural relics and museology)

=== Novels ===
- 《取火者的逮捕》 (Arrest of the fire-stealer)
- 《桂公塘》 (Gui gong tang)
- 《家庭的故事》 (Jia Ting de Gu Shi)

=== Prose ===
He wrote more than 20 prose texts and the following are some of the examples:

- 《中山集記》 (Shan zhong Za Ji)
- 《海燕》 (Hai Yan)
- 《避暑會》 (Bei Shu Hui)
- 《大同》 (Da Tong)
- 《山市》 (Shan Shi)
- 《離別》 (Li Bie)
- 《貓》 (Mao) (Cat)
- 《歐行日記》 (Ou xing ri ji) (Diary of Travels in Europe)
- 《最後一課》 (Zui Hou yi ke)
- 《月夜之話》 (Rou Ye Ji Hua)

=== Magazines and newspapers ===
- 新社會 (Xin Shehui) (New Society)
- 兒童世界 (Children's World)
- 戲劇 (Xiju)(Drama)
- 救國講演周刊 (Jiuguo Jiangyan Zhoukan)
- 小說月報 (Novel Monthly)
- 新學報 (Xinxue Bao)
- 時事新報 (Shishi xinbao) (Current events newspaper)
- 救亡日報 (Jiuwang Ribao)

=== Chief editor ===
- 《世界文庫》 (Shi jie wen ku) (The World's Library)
- 《醒世恒言》 (Xingshi hengyan)
- 《警世通言》 (Jingshi tongyan)

=== Translation works ===
- 《戀愛的故事》 (The Story of Love)
- 《飛鳥集》(StrayBird)
- 《俄國戰曲集》 (The Russian War Collections)
- 《灰色馬》 (Grey Horse)
- 《印度寓言》 (The Indian Fable)
- 《希臘羅馬神話傳說中的英雄傳說》 (Heroes from Greek and Roman Mythology)
- 《希臘神話》 (Greek Mythology)
- 《列那狐的歷史》 (The History of Reynard the Fox)
