= Creation Quarterly =

Chinese literary quarterly magazine

- Editor-in-chief: Guo Moruo
- Frequency: Quarterly
- Publisher: Creation Society
- First issue: 1922
- Final issue: 1924
- Country: China
- Language: Chinese

Creation Quarterly (Chinese: 創造季刊) was a Chinese literary quarterly magazine founded in 1921 and published between 1922 and 1924.

== Publication history ==
The first issue of Creation Quarterly debuted May 1, 1922 to a lively Beijing literary scene. Guo Moruo and his circle of friends founded the magazine near the end of 1921 in Tokyo. These young scholars were studying in Japan, soon to return to China. Throughout the summer and fall, Guo Moruo collected manuscripts from his friends in Kyoto and Tokyo.

Key players were Guo, Cheng Fangwu, Yu Dafu and Zhang Ziping. They decried the poor translations and crude writings of the day. "Creation Quarterly" espoused the "new vernacular literature", emphasizing freedom of form, personal fulfillment, and individual style. There is also a strain of romanticism harking back to 19th century English writers. Chinese society was changing rapidly with the younger generations embracing western ways. The new vernacular writings found a ready audience.
