= Zhang Ziping =

Chinese writer (1893–1959)

Zhang Ziping (simplified Chinese: 张资平; traditional Chinese: 張資平; pinyin: Zhāng Zīpíng; Jyutping: Cheung1 Ji1 Peng4) (May 24, 1893 – December 2, 1959) was a Chinese writer born in Meixian, Meizhou, Guangdong. He was a very popular author in the 1930s.

== Biography ==
Zhang received a classical education and, after studying in Japan from 1912, received a degree in geology from Tokyo Imperial University in 1922. On his return to China, he engaged in various business ventures, wrote, taught geology and literature. However, he eventually decided on a literary career, and with Yu Dafu, Guo Moruo and Tian Han he co-founded the Creation Society which promoted vernacular and modern literature. He worked as an editor of their literary magazine and it was during this time that he published the semi-autobiographical Fossils in Alluvial Deposits (冲积期化石, 1922), his first novel and arguably the first long-form fiction work of the May 4 Period.

Zhang went on to pursue a successful career as a novelist, writing stories of torrid love triangles that were popular with audiences but panned by critics. In an essay later collected in the volume Two Minds, Lu Xun wrote that Zhang's complete works could be distilled to a single symbol: a triangle.

After leaving the Creation Society in the 1928, he started up his own publisher, Liqun Books, through which he issued books and a literary journal. His output of fiction slackened after the early 1930s, and by the middle of the decade he was mainly writing science books and doing translations from the Japanese. A Modern Scarlet Letter (新红A字), a romance set in wartime Shanghai and published in 1945, was his final novel.

During the Second Sino-Japanese War he worked for the collaborationist Wang Jingwei Government in the Department of Agriculture and Mining, and later edited a journal for the Sino-Japanese Cultural Association. After the defeat of the Empire of Japan he was arrested and tried by the Kuomintang government for treason in 1947. In early 1948 he was sentenced to fifteen months in prison, and was released in early 1949.

During the early years of the People's Republic, Zhang taught geology in Shanghai and continued his translation and editing work. In June 1955 he was arrested for being a counter-revolutionary, and in September 1958 was sentenced to 20 years in prison. In 1959 he was sent to a labor farm in Anhui, where he died on December 2.
