= Chiang Fu-tsung =

Chinese educator and politician

- Born: 12 November 1898; Haining, Zhejiang, Qing Empire
- Died: 21 September 1990 (aged 91); Taipei, Taiwan
- Other names: Weitang (courtesy name)
- Occupations: educator, politician

Chiang Fu-tsung
- Traditional Chinese: 蔣復璁
- Simplified Chinese: 蒋复璁
Transcriptions
Standard Mandarin
- Hanyu Pinyin: Jiǎng Fùcōng
- Wade–Giles: Chiang Fu-tsung

Weitang (courtesy name)
- Traditional Chinese: 慰堂
- Simplified Chinese: 慰堂
Transcriptions
Standard Mandarin
- Hanyu Pinyin: Weìtáng
- Wade–Giles: Wei-t'ang

Chiang Fu-tsung (Chinese: 蔣復璁; 12 November 1898 – 21 September 1990), courtesy name Weitang, was a Chinese educator and politician of the Republic of China.

== Life ==
Chiang was born in a Catholic family in Haining, Zhejiang, China, towards the end of the Qing dynasty. He was a maternal cousin of the wuxia novelist Louis Cha. He graduated from Peking University in 1923 with a degree in philosophy, and obtained a government scholarship to study library science at Berlin University and graduated in 1930.

In 1933, Chiang started the National Central Library in Nanjing and oversaw its move to Chongqing during the Second Sino-Japanese War. On 1 August 1940, he was appointed as its first director. Between 1940 and 1941, he organised funding for the purchase of rare manuscripts and books collection preservation from collectors in Shanghai to protect them from looting by the Japanese during the war. The library was moved back to Nanjing between 1945 and 1946 after the end of the war. In 1948, the Nationalist government moved the library, along with its core collection of about 130,000 volumes of rare manuscript books, to Taiwan following its defeat by the Communists in the Chinese Civil War. On 23 April 1949, when Communist forces occupied Nanjing towards the end of the Chinese Civil War, Chiang left mainland China and went to Hong Kong before eventually settling down in Taipei, Taiwan.

In 1951, Chiang became a professor in the National Taiwan University. About three years later, he was appointed as the director of the National Central Library again after the library was rebuilt in Taipei. In September 1965, he became Director of National Palace Museum in Taipei. A year later, he was reassigned to be the director of the National Central Library. In 1974, he was elected to Academia Sinica, the national academy of Taiwan. In 1983, he resigned from the National Palace Museum and was appointed national policy adviser to President Chiang Ching-kuo.

Chiang died on 21 September 1990 in Taipei.
