= Yu Dafu =

Chinese writer and poet (1896–1945)

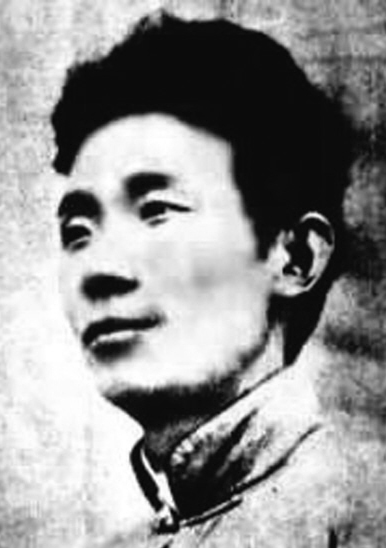
- Born: December 7, 1896; Fuyang, Zhejiang, Qing dynasty
- Died: September 17, 1945 (aged 48); Pajakoemboeh, Sumatra, Japanese-occupied Dutch East Indies
- Occupations: Writer and poet

Chinese name
- Traditional Chinese: 郁達夫
- Simplified Chinese: 郁达夫
Transcriptions
Standard Mandarin
- Hanyu Pinyin: Yù Dáfū
- Wade–Giles: Yü4 Ta2-fu1

Chinese name
- Traditional Chinese: 郁文
- Simplified Chinese: 郁文
Transcriptions
Standard Mandarin
- Hanyu Pinyin: Yù Wén
- Wade–Giles: Yü4 Wen2

Yu Wen, better known by his courtesy name Yu Dafu (December 7, 1896 – September 17, 1945) was a modern Chinese short story writer and poet. He was one of the new literary group initiators, and this new literary group was named the Creation Society. His literary masterpieces include Chenlun (沈淪, Sinking), Chunfeng chenzui de wanshang (春風沈醉的晚上, Intoxicating Spring Nights), Guoqu (過去, The Past), Chuben (出奔, Flight) and so on. Yu Dafu's literary works' writing style and main themes profoundly influenced a group of young writers and formed a spectacular romantic trend in Chinese literature in the 1920s and 1930s. He died in the Japanese-occupied Dutch East Indies, likely executed.

== Early years ==
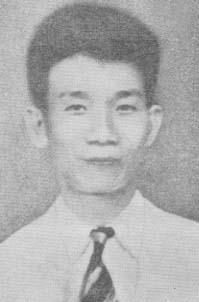
Yu Dafu

Yu was born in Fuyang, Zhejiang province. His father died when he was three, leaving the family poverty-stricken and destitute. He received a number of scholarships through the Chinese government and went on to receive a traditional Chinese education in Hangzhou. Chronologically he studied in Jiangxing Middle School (before he came to Hangzhou), Hangzhou Middle School, Hangchow Presbyterian College (育英学堂).

In 1912, he entered Hangchow University (later its major part merged into Zhejiang University) preparatory through examination. He was there only for a short period before he was expelled for participation in a student strike.

He then moved to imperial Japan, where he studied economics at the Tokyo Imperial University between 1913 and 1922, where he met other Chinese intellectuals (namely, Guo Moruo, Zhang Ziping, and Tian Han). Together, in 1921 they founded the Chuangzao she (創造社, Creation Society), which promoted vernacular and modern literature. He published one of his earlier works, the short story Chenlun (沈淪, Sinking), his most famous, while still in Japan in 1921. "Sinking" reflects a problem, which is that both China and Japan were once powerful countries in Asia, but at that time, in contrast to Japan's successful national modernization since Meiji restoration, China has not successfully achieved national modernization. Yu Dafu was ashamed of this, and he used such a story to express a sense of national shame, but in fact, this story's background does not match the facts. The work had gained immense popularity in China, shocking the world of Chinese literature with its frank dealing with sex, as well as grievances directed at the incompetence of the Chinese government at the time.

In 1922, he returned to China as a literary celebrity and worked as the editor of Creation Quarterly, editing journals and writing short stories. In 1923, after an attack of tuberculosis, Yu Dafu directed his attention to the welfare of the masses.

In 1927, he worked as an editor of the Hongshui literary magazine. He later came in conflict with the Chinese Communist Party and fled back to Japan.

== Second Sino-Japanese War ==
After the start of the Second Sino-Japanese War, he returned to China and worked as a writer of anti-Japanese propaganda in Hangzhou. From 1938 to 1942, he worked as a literary editor for the newspaper Sin Chew Jit Poh in Singapore.

In 1942 when the Imperial Japanese Army invaded Singapore, he was forced to flee to Pajakoemboeh, Sumatra, Indonesia. Known under a different identity, he settled there among other overseas Chinese and began a brewery business with the help of the locals. Later he was forced to help the Japanese military police as an interpreter when it was discovered that he was one of the few "locals" in the area who could speak Japanese.

On 29 August, he was arrested by the Kempeitai; it is believed that the Japanese executed him shortly after the surrender of Japan.

== Works ==
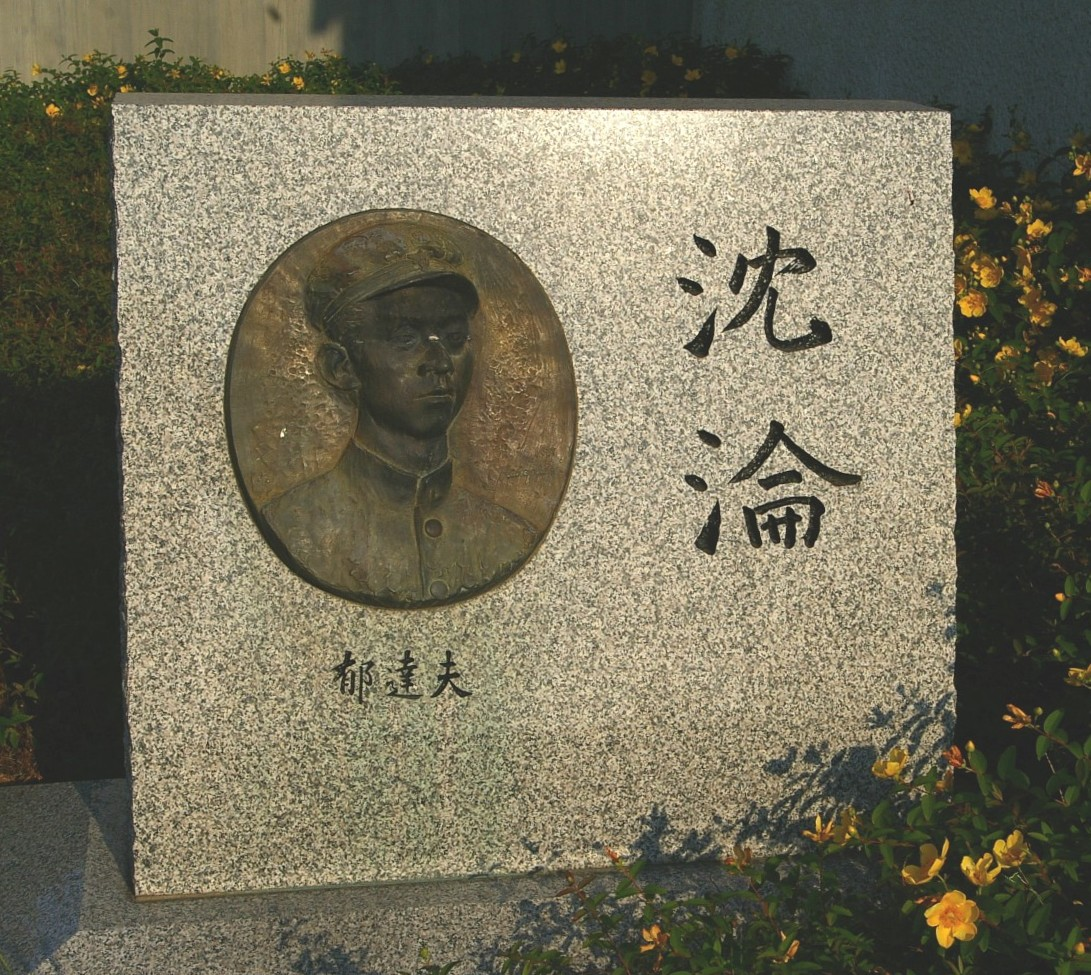
Yu Dafu 「沈淪」in Nagoya University

- Yín huīsè de sǐ 银灰色的死 (1921) (Translated into English as A Silver-Grey Death, Sunny Lou Publishing, ISBN 978-1955392433, 2023)
- Chenlun 沈淪 ("Sinking", 1921) (Translated into English as Drowning, Sunny Lou Publishing, ISBN 978-1-95539-217-4, 2021)
- Chunfeng chenzui de wanshang 春風沈醉的晚上 Intoxicating Spring Nights (1924)
- Nine Diaries 日記九種 (1927)
- Guoqu 過去 The Past (1927)
- Chuben 出奔 Flight (1935)
- Boundless Night (1922)

== Writing style ==
Yu Dafu's literary works are principally autobiographical in nature. There are many expressions with personal subjective colors in his works. He expresses his thoughts and feelings through the protagonist in the story. Moreover, the plot in the story is created based on his personal experience. Besides, his relationships with people around him are included in his works, such as his relationship with his mother and wife. It is precise because his works are derived from his own life that contemporary readers are very interested in his literary works.

Yu Dafu's sentimentalism was born in the decadent social reality of the "May 4th Movement Era". "The decadent ethos once swept through the world under the banner of aestheticism, and caring about morality was seen as something incompatible with emancipating the mind and reflecting the truth, which was 'decadent art'." Yu Dafu had an emotional resonance with this. At this time, Yu Dafu's creations were filled with gloomy and depressing "end-of-the-century emotions", but Yu Dafu's "end-of-the-century emotions" were based on the premise of resisting negative reality.

The story "Sinking" is considered one of the earliest psychological novels in modern Chinese novel history. At the same time, this story is viewed as a representative of romanticism, which satisfies one of the main literature characteristics during the May Fourth period. The protagonist in the "Sinking" quotes from ancient Chinese literature texts, like the verses of Wang Bo 王勃 (Poet of Tang Dynasty) and Huang Zhongze 黄仲则 (Poet of Qing Dynasty). Besides, the protagonist in the story not only quotes from Chinese literature texts, but he also quotes from Western literature texts, like the poems of Wordsworth (British poet) and Heine (German poet).

In the mid-1920s, Yu Dafu changed his writing style. His writing style changed from romantic individualism to collectivism, especially in new women's image expression. In the "Intoxicating Spring Nights", Yu Dafu described how a female factory worker regained her self-confidence in a difficult situation. He created an image of a proletarian woman who can strengthen the protagonist.

== Main themes ==
Yu Dafu's work is considered by leading scholars to be iconoclastic and controversial.

=== Sexuality ===
His characters, which supposedly reflect the author are "By turns voyeur, fetishist, homosexual, masochist, and kleptomaniac." The sexually repressed heroes cannot relate to women.

=== Loneliness ===
No matter whether the Chinese literature text or the Western literature text is cited in the "Sinking" short story, the same theme is expressed: loneliness. Yu Dafu believes this is a kind of thoughts and feelings that are not understood by other people. He used this melancholy state of mind to express the degeneration of the characters in the short story. At the same time, Yu Dafu laid the foundation for the criticism and self-reflection of Chinese international students' literature.

=== Transnationalism ===
The alleged 'decadence' of Yu Dafu's works, whether in a pejorative or in an aesthetic sense (i.e. 'Decadence' as an artistic movement) has been considered by Shih to be a sign of Yu Dafu's moral corruption.

== Portrait ==
- Yu Dafu. A Portrait by Kong Kai Ming at Portrait Gallery of Chinese Writers (Hong Kong Baptist University Library).
