= Cheng Fangwu =

Chinese educator

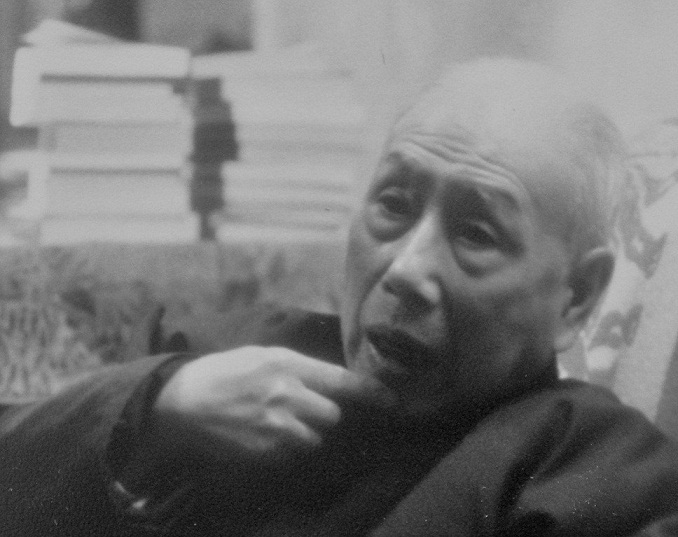
- Born: 24 August 1897; Xinhua County, Hunan, Qing Empire
- Died: 17 May 1984 (aged 86)
- Education: Tokyo Imperial University
- Political party: Chinese Communist Party

Cheng Fangwu (Chinese: 成仿吾; August 24, 1897 – 17 May 1984) was a top level politician in the Chinese Communist Party (CCP). Before joining the party, he was active as an author of the new literature and a translator. After joining the CCP, he quickly rose through the ranks to become in charge of the party's political education apparatus. After participating in the Long March, he established a mobile university to instruct Communist soldiers and party members as they waged a guerrilla war against the Japanese during the Second Sino-Japanese War. After the Communist victory in the Chinese Civil War, Cheng became President of Shandong University and helped establish Renmin University. He was purged in 1974 during the Cultural Revolution but given a sinecure translating Marx and Engels' texts into Chinese. Cheng was rehabilitated in 1978, and spent the final years of his life as President of Renmin University.

== Biography ==
Cheng Fangwu was born in Xinhua County, Hunan in 1897. He went to Japan in 1910 as a student of Military Science at the Tokyo Imperial University. He returned to China in 1921 and joined the Creation Society circle of scholars with Yu Dafu and other Chinese intellectuals, publishing numerous articles promulgating the new literature. He was appointed to the faculty of Sun Yat-sen University in Canton in 1924 and also to the Physics faculty at Whampoa Military Academy. He joined the Kuomintang Party in 1925. Despite the establishment jobs he soon became close to Zhou Enlai and Mao Zedong and joined a failed Communist coup d'état. On the government arrest list, Cheng then went in exile to Japan and later Europe, specifically Germany. He mastered the German language and years later authored the direct translation from German to Chinese of Marx and Engels "The Communist Manifesto" which became texts for the Chinese Communist Party. In 1928 he joined the Chinese Communist Party in Paris and published their house journal.

Cheng returned to China in September 1931 and soon went to the Eyuwan Soviet (鄂豫皖), a Communist base that straddled 3 provinces (Hubei, Anhui and Henan). In this mountainous region Cheng became the senior commissar responsible for most of the administrative activity, including the economy, education, taxation and transportation. At the second Chinese Soviet Congress in 1934, he was elected to various positions including head of the CCP Education Committee and member of the CCP Central Committee. From then on, Cheng was responsible for the Party education system as it evolved.

=== Long March and Beyond ===
In October 1934, the CCP decided to abandon its bases in southern China and embarked on the Long March towards the more remote northwest. Cheng accompanied the Chinese Red Army on the march. One year later, they arrived in the Yan'an caves of northern Shaanxi. There the CCP established a new base area that they successfully defended against Nationalist suppression campaigns. In 1937, the start of the Second Sino-Japanese War led thousands of Chinese students to flee the cities of northern China, many ending up in Shaanxi. The CCP was unprepared to meet this sudden influx, but Cheng established the Shaanbei Public Academy in July 1937 to give them a political education. The school faced severe financial difficulties given the poverty of the students and survived on subsidies from the CCP Central Committee. Cheng was at first the only faculty member, and had to rely on other party leaders to give guest lectures. He organized the students into a command structure with "brigades", "brigade branches", and "platoons", wach with elected officers. The better-educated students in these groups would teach the others. In 1939, the Shaanbei Public Academy was combined with three other institutions to create the Huabei United University, of which Cheng became the President. Huabei was a mobile university that followed the Communists as the waged a guerilla war against the Japanese. At one time due to certain special conditions, 1,500 students were sent behind the Japanese enemy lines. Cheng went with them and organized their continuing education which required scheduling surreptitious class gatherings.

The People's Republic of China was established in 1949, and the following year Cheng established Renmin University in Beijing. In 1952, he became President of Northeast Normal University in Changchun. He was then President of Shandong University in Jinan from August 1958 until January 1974. Shandong is a regular university, part of the Education Ministry. Cheng brought a fresh breeze and re-invigorated the University with his focus on grass roots reality and personal knowledge of the subject matter. He set a personal example by always writing his own memo's, reports and text notes.

Cheng Fangwu was a fervent dedicated Marxist to the core, and had the same commitment to cadre education. He required his education system to conform to reality, of which he experienced in abundance. One reality which he never anticipated was being attacked personally (two broken bones) with the University disbanded during the Cultural Revolution. Mao finally protected him in 1974 by setting up a special office for Cheng to translate Marx and Engels. He was rehabilitated in 1978 and became president of Renmin University.

=== Quotes and Vignettes ===
There are many colorful stories about Cheng Fangwu. During a criticism session, the lead persecutor was reciting a poem by Mao Zedong to threaten Cheng. The poem was saying that a hunter of tigers and leopards should not be afraid of bears. The speaker mispronounced the last word in the poem as "ba". Cheng replied, "You said it wrong, instead of 'ba' you want 'pi'!" The entire hall applauded ... pi also means fart.

- Mao said of Cheng Fangwu...
  - "Shaanbei Public School will certainly do well because of having Cheng Fangwu in the field of Education and Chau Choun Chueng in the field of Military Technology." in November 1937 in Northern China
  - "Shaanbei Public School reflects the image of united revolution and China's development. China will not be destroyed with the existence of Shaanbei Public School." on March 3, 1938 in Northern China
  - "There are two precious lessons I give for the students of Shaanbei Public School: The first, insist on the direction of politics; The second, is to work hard and stride to the end. During the past seventeen years, when the communist group met extraordinary hardship and still insisted on their political direction, the struggling hardship became the whole communist tradition, and Cheng Fangwu is just this kind of man." on April 1, 1938 at Opening Ceremony speech of the 2nd graduating year
- On May 21, 1976, one of the Communist Leader, Marshal Zhu De, age 90, visited Cheng Fangwu at Central Communist School and said to him, "It is important to understand Marxism. For this purpose we need a good translated book and your translated book (Cheng's 1976 translated book Communist Manifesto) is easy to understand. This good job has a worldwide meaning."
- Chinese leader, Chan Wing said in 1986: "Cheng Fangwu is our civil revolutionist, loyal warrior, educator, and social scientist."

== Published works ==
- "New Year Celebration", a novel, 1929, Creation Quarterly
- "Mission" a review, 1927, Creation Quarterly
- "Stray" novel and poems, 1927, Creation Quarterly
- "From Literary Revolution to Revolutionary Literature" essays with Guo Morou, 1928, Creation Quarterly
- "Collected Works of Fangwu" essays, 1928, Creation Quarterly
- "Literary Reviews" reviews, with You Dafu, 1928, Creation Quarterly
- "Xinxing Literature Collection" Reviews and travelogue, 1930, Creation Quarterly
- "Memoires of the Long March" Memoires, 1977, Remin Press
- "A University amidst the Fire of War" Memoires, 1982, Renmin Education Press
- "Collected Works of Cheng Fangwu" 1985, Shandong University Press
- "Communist Manifesto" translation with Xu Bing, 1938, Hong Kong
- "German Poem Anthology" translations from Goethe and Heine with Guo Morou, 1927, Creation Quarterly

== Citations ==
Academic offices
Preceded by Chao Zhefu	President of Shandong University; 1958–1974	Succeeded by Wu Fuheng
Preceded by Wu Yuzhang	President of Renmin University of China; 1978–1983	Succeeded by Guo Yingqiu
