= When I Was in Xia Village =

1941 short story by Ding Ling

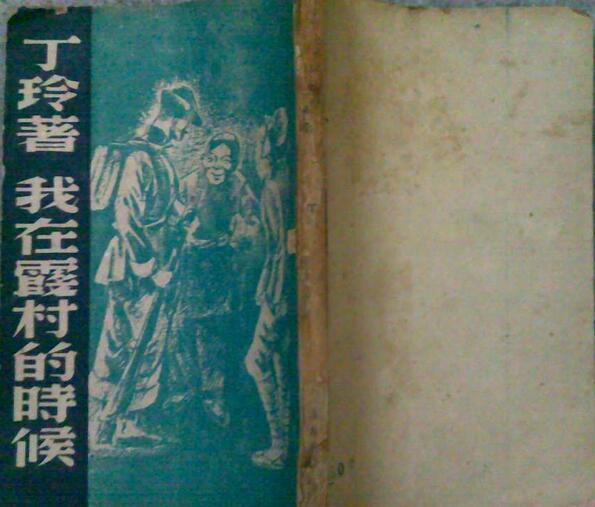
Printed Cover of Ding Ling's 1941 fiction "When I was in Xia Village"

"When I was in Xia Village" (Simplified Chinese: 我在霞村的时候; Pinyin: wǒ zài xiá cūn de shí hòu) is a short story written in 1941 by Ding Ling, a Chinese writer. The story was originally published in June 1941 in China's Culture (中国文化, zhōng guó wén huà), a Yan'an journal, which tells the story of a young woman named Zhen Zhen, who was abducted and forced into sexual servitude by the invading Japanese. She later worked as a spy for the Chinese Communist Party (CCP) as a Japanese army prostitute to collect wartime information. Zhen Zhen was treated differently with honor, pity, and disdain by her fellow villagers, as well as by Party members upon her return to Xia village.

Written during the Second Sino-Japanese War, the story is generally read as both a national defense narrative and a revelation of the dark side of communist revolutionary experience. Ding Ling subtly criticized the societal pressures placed on women in a 1940s revolutionary context. Furthermore, the story speaks to the inconsistencies between the Party's official rhetoric of women's liberation and its exploitation of women's sexuality in the name of revolution.

During the anti-rightist campaign in the late 1950s, the story was attacked for discrediting the Party and "glorifying" prostitution. It was further criticized as a blatant example of Ding Ling's own ideological problems and sexual immorality, and she was finally expelled from the Party before being "rehabilitated" in 1978.

== Historical context ==
As a prominent member of the May Fourth generation of writers, Ding Ling's early writing primarily deals with personal liberation and contains elements of Western-style feminism. With the Chinese society in full crisis, many writers and intellectuals chose to step beyond realistic representation in favor of political statements. Ding Ling was no exception. In 1931, she took over as the editor of the communist front journal "Great Dipper" for the League of Left Wing Writers, and secretly joined the CCP in 1932.

The early 1930s marked a shift in Ding Ling's writing and her perception of herself. Her narrative transformed from individual self-expression as she was converted to left-wing ideologies and became a forerunner in revolutionary fiction. Ding Ling began to identify herself as a specific type of writer, and recognized the importance of literature in responding to political crises. Love, sexuality, and self-consciousness, themes that were prevalent in her earlier works such as Miss Sophia's Diary, began to subside in her later work, replaced in favor of nationalistic and revolutionary concerns.

Although many saw her changing narratives as betraying feminism, Ding Ling did not give up advocating for gender justice and change. In 1936, Ding Ling escaped from her imprisonment by the Kuomintang (KMT) and arrived in Yan'an, the revolutionary base of the Communist Party. She began teaching Chinese literature at the Red Army Academy and was given responsibilities for political training. While emphasizing that women in Yan'an were far better off than women in other parts of China, Ding Ling did not remain silent about the many inequalities and unfortunate phenomena that existed in the communist "new society." "When I Was in Xia Village" was a significant piece of writing, representing Ding Ling's Yan'an work before 1942. The story simultaneously reflects the author's transformation from self-liberation to expressing revolutionary concerns, and highlights the gaps that existed between her and the Party's ideologies. By drawing on the dark side of Yan'an reality, it questions the various kinds of oppression women had to confront even in the revolutionary community.

=== Publication history ===
When I was in Xia Village was published in Yan'an in June 1941. It was reprinted in the 1944 July Literary Series and included in the 1946 anthology Collection of Short Stories in the Liberated Areas.

In 1950, Ding revised the story to soften several politically sensitive points.

== Characters ==
- Narrator
- Zhen Zhen
- Xia Dabao
- A Gui
- Liu Erma

== Summary ==
"When I was in Xia Village" is told through the first-person perspective of the narrator, a cultural cadre of the CCP who was visiting Xia village. Here she meets with the young woman Zhen Zhen, whose name literally means "chastity." Abducted and raped by the Japanese during a raid on the village, Zhen Zhen was forced into sexual servitude. After escaping, she was convinced by the Communist Party and was sent back among the enemy as a secret agent to gather military information for the revolutionary army. She returns to Xia village (which is newly liberated by the CCP) a year later to undergo medical treatment for venereal disease.

Zhen Zhen's return from the frontier generated commotion. While some youths, along with her former lover, appreciate her courage and sacrifice, many villagers of the older generation, including her parents and even a female party member, resent her experience as a shame for women for violating the chastity code. Zhen Zhen is disdained and regarded as somewhat "subhuman." However, Zhen Zhen resists any "reasonable" solutions. With a strong sense of self-reflection, she refuses to comply with her family's wishes to marry her former lover. Rather, she copes with her condition and precarious psychological state with self-strength and forward planning.

The story concludes with Zhen Zhen deciding to leave the village in search of study and recovery in, allegedly, Yan'an. With the implication of a positive ending and a certain anticipatory attitude, Zhen Zhen explains to the narrator, who had developed a friendship with her: "I'm doing this for myself, but I'm also doing it for the others. I don't feel that I owe anyone an apology. Neither do I feel especially happy. What I do feel is that after I go to [Yan'an], I'll be in a new situation. I will be able to start life fresh."

== Interpretations and analyses ==
"When I was in Xia Village" has sparked various interpretations. One partial reading of the story highlights the motif of intellectual learning from the masses, something that the CCP upholds and was later systematically enforced in Talks at the Yan'an Forum on Literature and Arts by Mao Zedong. This is shown in the story through the narrator, who admires and is inspired by Zhen Zhen, a peasant girl. She overcomes difficult obstacles to build a new, fulfilling life. This conveys the message that intellectuals should be re-educated by the people.

To some critics, the story is also a reflection of Ding Ling's May Fourth attitude and her feminist message against China's "feudalist" consciousness. The villagers' treatment of Zhen Zhen signifies the conflict between modern and conventional concepts of "chastity." The idea of modern versus older feudalist traditions, as one of the major themes of May Fourth Literature, is epitomized through the vastly different responses Zhen Zhen receives from the youths and the older villagers. Such an emphasis on the villagers' backwardness also hints at Ding Ling's vision of Yan'an as a new society. As pointed out by Feng, Ding Ling chose to publish the story after the Party released confirmation of her political allegiance investigation, and two months after she became the editor of the CCP's official newspaper, Liberation Daily. Zhen Zhen's life experience symbolized Ding Ling's own vision and understanding of national liberation and socialist revolution; while the process is slow and painful, the otherwise marginalized and silenced, in this case, Chinese women, are empowered, and their plight is acknowledged and resolved. The Party itself was the alternative for Zhen Zhen, whose life is otherwise wretched, to start afresh. While the villagers' prejudices about unchaste women meant that there would be no hope in staying, Yan'an, as a "new situation," was the only place that could offer Zhen Zhen new possibilities for a hopeful future.

However, besides the seemingly positive tone, the story is often analyzed as revealing the oppression women faced in communist communities, the CCP's limitations in handling this oppression, and women's self-strength. By describing Zhen Zhen's extreme sacrifice, it emphasizes her dedication to national interests against the invading Japanese. However, Ding Ling also subtly reveals the limited or distant form of support and compassion provided by the CCP to its agents' physical and emotional health. Zhen Zhen implies in her descriptions of the mission that she was alone and unsupported; whereas when she returns home, she was still subjected to gossip and did not receive any immediate or direct supportive resources.

As a national-defense narrative that is intended to focus on the protagonist's heroism, "When I was in Xia Village" implies rather a contradiction between gender equality and anti-Japanese nationalism. Feuerwerker identifies how Zhen Zhen's female sexuality had been "brutally exploited by both sides in the war — the physical use by one is a means of gaining information for the other." Under wartime context, women are subordinated to the collective nature of the revolution over which they have no control.

Barlow explains that Ding Ling was perhaps trying to reverse such "association she found intolerable in Communist Party practice between a woman's political loyalty and her sexual chastity." This reversal is reflected in the special relationships between the narrator, the female character Zhen Zhen, and the community. The narrator, a female Party comrade whose identity is unclear, stands in a sororal relationship with the sexually compromised Zhen Zhen. The narrator supports Zhen Zhen and allows her to freely express the horrible experiences that affected and shaped her life as a woman.

Eventually, the story speaks to female self-strength and active agency. Zhen Zhen distinguishes herself from her unfortunate experience and resists being defined by other forces, such as arranged marriage. Rather than identifying herself as only a rape victim, Zhen Zhen assigns meaning to herself and her life by showing a strong sense of self. Disregarding any patriarchal code or social disciplines, Zhen Zhen is determined to pursue a meaningful life in Yan'an and to search for her true self.

== Reception ==
Initially, "When I was in Xia Village" did not receive much criticism from the Party. Through it was published from 1941 until the mid-1950s, the story was not a target of direct criticism. As a wartime national defense narrative, it received positive responses from some prominent literary cadres such as Feng Xuefeng and Hu Feng, and was included in multiple collected works by these CCP intellectuals.

The positive receptions came to a halt with the Anti-Rightist Campaign in 1957. During this time, Ding Ling's Thoughts on March 8, In the Hospital, and When I was in Xia Village received severe political denunciation from some top CCP members and theorists. They were singled out as targets for deviating from Party ideologies. "When I was in Xia Village" was reprimanded for exposing the dark side of the sacred revolution, and for emphasizing the backwardness of the masses in communist-liberated villages, instead of presenting a positive picture of the Party alliancing with the peasants. Ding Ling's separation of women as an independent, oppressed group was also problematic for the Party. For the CCP, all forms of oppression, including gender oppression, are class oppression. Women's interests should not be separated from the socialist revolution and the liberation of the Chinese people as a whole. By emphasizing women's unique plight and interests, the story came to be criticized for separating women from the revolutionary collective.

Ding Ling was further accused of glorifying prostitute through her work, which was subsequently associated with her own-perceived wrongdoings. While under house arrest from 1933 to 1936 in Nanjing, Ding Ling lived with Feng Da, a man who had betrayed the Party and became a spy for the KMT. Based on this information, Ding Ling was condemned for treachery. The Party charged Ding Ling for violating female chastity and thus diverging from the Communist ideal of purity. "When I was in Xia Village", as a fictional version of "sleeping with the enemy," was considered a "glorification" of a prostitute in the enemy's camp, and a defense of Ding Ling's immorality. The heroine Zhen Zhen now became a "self-portrait" and was viewed as a reincarnation of Ding Ling herself. Zhou Yang, a communist literary theorist, once called Zhen Zhen a "rotten woman like a prostitute" who "was beautified by her author into a goddess." By turning Zhen Zhen from a wartime hero to an unchaste prostitute, the Party defended itself by declaring that its leadership would never use women as sex spies. The CCP further maintained its ruling power and moral standing by presenting itself as a guardian of an "ordered, well-defined sexually moral society."

Since 1978, the rehabilitation of Ding Ling and her work shows the Party's continued use of female chastity as a way to present the Party and the nation in a legit, yet victimized way. Zhen Zhen not only shows a lofty sense of loyalty and patriotism, but is also reemphasized as a victim of foreign abuse and invasion. This characterization also extends to Ding Ling, whose image is now rehabilitated for demonstrating the extraordinary revolutionary responsibility of Communist Party members.

In 2003, the story was adapted into the film Zhenzhen, which also incorporates elements of Lao She's The Loyalists and Martyrs.

== English translations ==
- Ding, Ling, Tani E Barlow, and Gary J Bjorge. "When I was in Xia Village," in I Myself Am a Woman: Selected Writings of Ding Ling. Boston: Beacon Press, 1989.
- Feuerwerker, Yi-tsi, and Ting Ling. "Ting Ling's "When I Was in Sha Chuan (Cloud Village)"." Signs 2, no. 1 (1976): 255-79.

== Bibliography ==
Ding, Ling, Tani E Barlow, and Gary J Bjorge. I Myself Am a Woman: Selected Writings of Ding Ling. Boston: Beacon Press, 1989.

Edwards, Louise. "Women Sex-spies: Chastity, National Dignity, Legitimate Government and Ding Ling's "When I Was in Xia Village"." The China Quarterly, no. 212 (2012): 1059-078. Accessed April 21, 2021.

Feng, Jin. The New Woman in Early Twentieth-Century Chinese Fiction. Comparative Cultural Studies. West Lafayette, Ind.: Purdue University Press, 2004.

Feuerwerker, Yi-tsi, and Ting Ling. "Ting Ling's "When I Was in Sha Chuan (Cloud Village)"." Signs 2, no. 1 (1976): 255-79.

Feuerwerker, Yi-tsi Mei. Ding Ling's Fiction: Ideology and Narrative in Modern Chinese Literature. Harvard East Asian Series, 98. Cambridge, Mass.: Harvard University Press, 1982.

Johnson, Kay Ann. Women, the Family, and Peasant Revolution in China (version Pbk. ed.). Pbk.ed. Acls Humanities E-Book. Chicago: University of Chicago Press, 1985.

Mostow, Joshua S, ed. The Columbia Companion to Modern East Asian Literature. New York: Columbia University Press, 2003.

"The Changing Relationship between Literature and Life: Aspects of the Writer's Role in Ding Ling [Ting Ling]." In Merle Goldman, ed. Modern Chinese Literature in the May Fourth Era. Cambridge: Harvard University Press, 1977, 281–307.

Wang, Xiaojue. Modernity with a Cold War Face: Reimagining the Nation in Chinese Literature Across the 1949 Divide. Harvard East Asian Monographs, 360. Cambridge, Massachusetts: Harvard University Asia Center, 2013.

Wang, Xiaoping. Contending for the "Chinese Modern": The Writing of Fiction in the Great Transformative Epoch of Modern China, 1937-1949. Ideas, History, and Modern China, Volume 20. Leiden: Brill, 2019.

Yan, Haiping. Chinese Women Writers and the Feminist Imagination, 1905-1948. Asia's Transformations. London: Routledge, 2006.
