= Ding Ling =

Chinese writer (1904–1986)

Ding Ling 丁玲
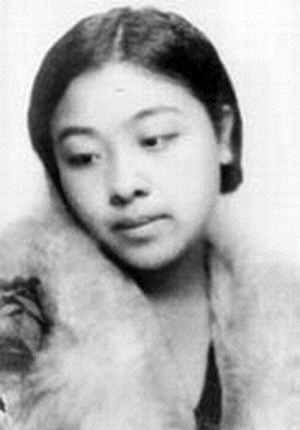
- Born: Jiang Bingzhi; 12 October 1904; Linli, Hunan, China
- Died: 4 March 1986 (aged 81); Beijing, China
- Occupation: Writer
- Spouse(s): Hu Yepin; Feng Da; Chen Ming
- Children: 2
- Writing career
- Language: Chinese
- Notable works: Miss Sophia's Diary; The Sun Shines over the Sanggan River

Ding Ling (Chinese: 丁玲; pinyin: Dīng Líng; 12 October 1904 – 4 March 1986), formerly romanized as Ting Ling, was the pen name of Jiang Bingzhi (simplified Chinese: 蒋冰之; traditional Chinese: 蔣冰之; pinyin: Jiǎng Bīngzhī), also known as Bin Zhi (彬芷 Bīn Zhǐ), known for her feminist and socialist realist literature.

Ding was active in leftist literary circles connected to the Chinese Communist Party (CCP) and was imprisoned by the Chinese Nationalist Party (Kuomintang or "KMT") for her politics. She later became a leader in the literary community in the CCP revolutionary base area of Yan'an, and held positions in the early government of the People's Republic of China. She was awarded the Soviet Union's Stalin second prize for Literature in 1951 for her The Sun Shines Over Sanggan River.

Ding's political loyalties were questioned over time because of a note she had written while being held captive by the KMT and because of her relationship with Feng Da, who had betrayed her to the KMT. After the Anti-Rightist Campaign in 1958, Ding was denounced, expelled from the CCP, and exiled to Manchuria. She was rehabilitated in 1979 and a 1984 CCP resolution formally affirmed that the initial 1940 investigation concluding that she had remained loyal to the party while in KMT custody was correct. Ding died in Beijing in 1986.

== Early life ==
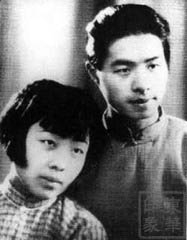
Ding Ling and husband Hu Yepin in 1926

Ding Ling was born as Jiang Bingzhi into a gentry family in Linli, Hunan province. Her father, Jiang Baoqian, was a scholar in the late Qing Dynasty and died when Ding Ling was 3 years old.

Ding Ling's mother, Yu Manzhen, studied at the Hunan Provincial No. 1 Normal School for Girls where she was a classmate of Xiang Jingyu, an early pioneer in Chinese feminism. She later became an elementary school educator who raised her children as a single mother. Ding Ling's mother was Ding's role model, and she would later write an unfinished novel, titled Mother, describing her mother's experiences. After the death of Ding's father, Ding's mother became a revolutionary. She often told Ding stories of martyrs, particularly Qiu Jin. Following her mother's example, Ding Ling became an activist at an early age.

During the 1911 Revolution, Ding's uncle was executed by Qing soldiers because he was a revolutionary.

Through her roommate Cao Mengjun's boyfriend Zuo Gong, Ding Ling met her future husband Hu Yepin, then editor of the supplement of the Beijing News. When Ding Ling returned to her hometown during summer vacation, Hu Yepin rushed to Hunan. Ding Ling recalled, "Our thoughts, characters, and feelings are different, but his bravery, enthusiasm, stubbornness, optimism and poverty all surprised me... The smooth sintered glass beads had gone up somewhere. So we had a deep friendship right away." In 1925, Ding Ling and Hu Yepin lived together in Beijing, but as she said, "but we had no husband and wife relationship", because "I, Ding Ling, did not want to use love or marriage to fetter me; I am a person who wants to be free".

== Literature and politics ==
In December 1927, Ding Ling wrote and published her first novel Meng Ke in Beijing, which was published in the magazine Fiction Monthly, describing the struggle of a young woman born in a declining bureaucratic family in Shanghai. The initial concern for women's issues was appreciated by editor-in-chief of Ye Shengtao.

In February 1928, Ding Ling published Miss Sophia's Diary in the Fiction Monthly. The book, in which a young woman describes her unhappiness with her life and confused romantic and sexual feelings, caused a sensation in the literary world. Miss Sophia's Diary highlights Ding Ling's close association and belief in the New Woman movement which was occurring in China during the 1920s. At this time, Ding Ling and Hu Yepin frequently traveled from Beijing to Shanghai. They lived briefly in Hangzhou from March to July of the same year, and then returned to Shanghai.

Around this time Ding Ling met the CCP member, writer, and activist Feng Xuefeng, who unlike Hu Yepin was active in politics. Ding Ling fell in love with Feng, and at the end of February, the three had a long talk in Hangzhou, after which Feng Xuefeng backed out and Ding Ling and Hu Yebin got married and lived in Shanghai. Ding Ling later recalled: "I had lived with Hu Yepin for two and a half years, and I'd never said that I would agree to marry them, but I also did not reject his feelings for me. He gave me many things; I did not reject them. Although the two of us had an arrangement, we could have broken it off at any time. We were not husband and wife, but other people saw us as husband and wife. When I talked about these feelings, and about reason, all I could do was lose Xuefeng."

In 1927, the Kuomintang began a purge of Communists and their supporters, which was known as the White Terror. The KMT executed Xiang Jingyu during the White Terror. Xiang's execution deeply affected Ding and increased her political leanings toward Communism.

In the summer of 1928, Ding Ling and Hu Yepin as a couple moved from Beijing to Shanghai via Hangzhou, and lived in the Shanghai French Concession. There they founded a publishing house to publish a magazine "Red and Black" together with Shen Congwen. In early 1929, Ding Ling started editing and publishing the "Renjian (Humanity)" magazine, but both magazines ceased publication soon afterward. Ding and Hu were finally broke and lived on the rent sent by Ding Ling's mother. In the winter of 1929, Ding Ling completed the novel "Wei Hu (Protection)", which was based on the love story between Ding Ling's friend Wang Jianhong and CCP member Qu Qiubai.

In February 1930, Hu Yepin went to Jinan to teach at the Shandong Provincial Senior High School, and Ding Ling joined him soon after. In Jinan, Hu Yepin accepted and began to actively promote Marxism–Leninism, which attracted the attention of the Kuomintang (KMT). In May 1930, Ding and Hu joined the League of Left-Wing Writers. In November 1930, Ding's and Hu Yepin's son Jiang Zulin born. In March 1931, Ding placed her son in the care of her mother and returned to Hunan, accompanied by Shen Congwen.

In 1931, Hu was arrested and executed by the KMT. In grief, Ding Ling sent her son who was less than 100 days old back to Hunan to be taken care of by her mother. In May, Ding Ling published her and Hu Yepin's joint collection "The Birth of a Man" to commemorate Hu Yepin's death. The CCP invited Ding to become the editor-in-chief of the Beidou, a new left-wing magazine, and she accepted.

Ding lived alone in Shanghai after Hu's death. She wrote love letters to Feng Xuefeng, who was married. Feng Xuefang responded with friendship. He introduced Ding to Feng Da, who was working as the secretary to Agnes Smedley. Ding moved in with Feng Da in late 1931.

In March 1932, Ding joined the CCP and succeeded Qian Xingcun as the party committee secretary of the League of Left-Wing Writers.

== Political imprisonment in Nanjing ==
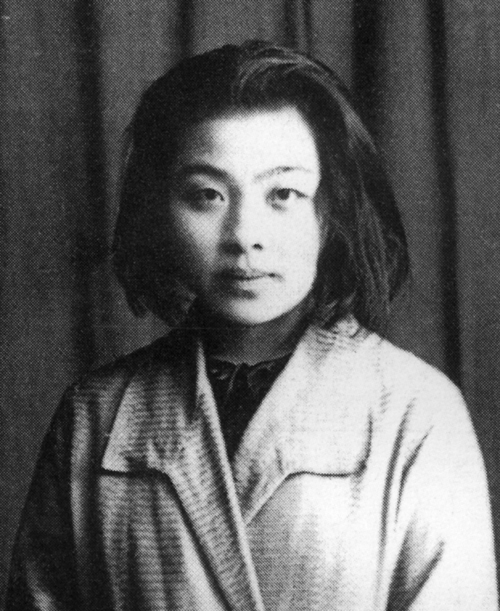
Ding Ling, 1930s

On 14 May 1933, Ding was kidnapped from her residence in the Shanghai international settlement along with Pan Zinian, a leftist intellectual who was visiting Ding. Leftist poet Ying Xiuren was also ambushed by the KMT at Ding's apartment and jumped out a window, killing himself to avoid capture.

Newspapers reported on Ding's disappearance and prominent public figures including Song Qingling, Cai Yuanpei, and Yang Xingfo sought the rescue of Ding and Pan. A group of progressive intellectuals formed the Association for Rescuing Ding Ling and Pan Zinian. This group issued the "Declaration from the Cultural Community for the Rescue of Ding Ling and Pan Zinian," which called for the KMT to release the abductees. Lu Xun wrote a classical Chinese poem, A Lament for Ms. Ding, to commemorate her.

For a long time, the Kuomintang government denied arresting Ding Ling, and many of Ding Ling's friends thought she was dead.

In September 1933, under persuasion, Ding Ling wrote the following note:

"I was arrested because of a misunderstanding, and I received preferential treatment; I did not go through any trial and punishment. After going out, I will not be active in politics. I only wish to study at home and take care of my mother..."

Ding thought that the note would help her regain her freedom but to no avail. (Later, under political investigation by the CCP, this note be used to criticize Ding. Some critics would use the note to accuse her of "losing integrity" in 1945, and of "renegade behavior, lack of loyalty and honesty to the party" in 1956 to 1975. In 1979, the conclusion of 1975 was revoked, but the conclusion of 1956 was maintained. Only in 1984 was she fully rehabilitated.)

Under house arrest by the KMT, Ding lived with her then-husband Feng Da, who was suspected of betraying her to the KMT. In April 1934, Feng worked as an interpreter in the Kuomintang organization, and the Kuomintang still gave Ding Ling 100 yuan per month for living expenses, so while the two were still under house arrest, they had a little more freedom. Accepting living expenses has also become an issue for Ding Ling's political scrutiny in the future. In October 1934, Ding gave birth to her daughter Jiang Zuhui with Feng Da, which also took her surname instead of Feng's.

According to Ding, Yao Pengzi informed her in April 1934 that Feng had disclosed her address to the KMT, leading to her arrest. She ended her sexual relationship with Feng upon hearing this. In October 1934, Ding gave birth to a child whose father was Feng.

Ding described her time in the KMT's captivity in her 1983 memoir The World of Demons and Monsters. According to her memoir, Ding attempted to kill herself by hanging during her captivity, but Feng intervened. Ding's works later in life portray Feng in a neutral light.

Ding escaped with the assistance of the CCP. In July 1936, arranged by Feng Xuefeng, Ding fled Nanjing on train and came to Shanghai. On the night of the Mid-Autumn Festival, she escaped from a hiding place at a friend's house in Shanghai and arrived in Xi'an in early October, after which she made her way to the CCP revolutionary base area of Yan'an the month after.

== Early life in Yan'an ==
Ding Ling became one of the most influential figures in Yan'an cultural circles. Within days of arriving, she had a major role in establishing the Chinese Literature and Arts Association, which was the first literary organization in the Yan'an base area. As arguably the most famous writer who came to Yan'an area from the KMT-controlled areas, she initially enjoyed close relations with many top CCP leaders. At the end of 1936, Mao Zedong wrote and dedicated the poem The Immortals at the River: To Ding Ling. In it, he compared, Ding Ling's literary prowess to military prowess. It is the only one of Mao's poems that he ever dedicated to a writer.

In April 1937, Ding wrote the first of the works she authored in Yan'an, An Unfired Bullet. The story advocates for a united front against the Empire of Japan during the Second Sino-Japanese War.

Following the Marco Polo Bridge Incident and the beginning of the Second Sino-Japanese War, Ding organised a group primarily of students from the Anti-Japanese Military and Political University which headed towards the front lines. As they traveled, the group disseminated patriotic and anti-Japanese messages through newsletters and artistic performances. On 12 August 1937, the group was officially titled the Northwest Front Service Corps and Ding served as its director. Among the works Ding created as the director of the group was Reunion, a play in which a female revolutionary is arrested and imprisoned by Japanese special agents.

After that, Ding settled in Yan'an and wrote literary works. In 1938, Ding began studying at the Yan'an Marxism–Leninism Institute, which was a training center for cadre. At the end of 1939, Ding worked in the Cultural Association of Shaanxi-Gansu-Ningxia Border Region.

Speculation began in 1940 that Ding had collaborated with the KMT while being held captive. Ding volunteered to be investigated by the CCP and Ren Bishi was designated as the investigator. During the investigation, Ding did not mention the "note" she wrote, leading to the erroneous conclusion at the end of the investigation that Ding "did not provide any written communication to the KMT." The investigation also concluded that there was no evidence that she cooperated with the KMT, that her relationship with Feng Da was involuntary, and that she remained committed to the CCP. This conclusion was endorsed by Chen Yun and Li Fuchun. On October 4, the "Conclusion of the Central Organization Department's Review of Comrade Ding Ling's Arrest and Ban" stated, "According to the existing materials, there is no concrete proof that Comrade Ding Ling had surrendered himself. Therefore, the legend of surrender cannot be trusted. But Comrade Ding Ling Not taking advantage of the possibility (although there are also concerns) to leave Nanjing early (it should be estimated that living in Nanjing is not good for foreign influence). This kind of disposal is inappropriate. ... Comrade Ding Ling should be considered to be still a loyal party to the revolution". The last sentence was added by Mao Zedong himself.

In May 1941, Ding served as the editor-in-chief of the literary column of Jiefang Daily, an organ of the Central Committee of the Chinese Communist Party.

During this time, Ding wrote the following three well known works:

- The short story When I Was in Xia Village, published in June 1941, drew inspiration from an account that Ding learned from one of her comrades. The story is about a woman forced into prostitution by the Japanese who later joins the Chinese Communist Party as a spy. It criticized the treatment of women within the party and challenged the supposed 'equality' between men and women that it failed to uphold. Ding Ling said that the heroine Zhenzhen "entrusted her own feelings" because she was "lonely", "proud" and "tough".
- The short story "In the Hospital", published in the "Gu Yu" magazine on November 15, 1941, and was also adapted from a true story. The short story criticized the hardships of a Yan'an hospital from the perspective of a new nurse. Ding was later criticized for this story for "having the standpoint of a petty-bourgeois intellectual".
- The essay Thoughts on March 8, published in CCP newspaper Jiefang Daily on March 9, 1942, questioning the party's commitment to change popular attitudes towards women. Here, Ding satirized male double standards concerning women, saying they were ridiculed if they focused on household duties, but also became the target of gossip and rumors if they remained unmarried and worked in the public sphere. She also criticized male cadres use of divorce provisions to rid themselves of unwanted wives.

== Yan'an Rectification Movement ==
In February 1942, the Yan'an Rectification Movement started and intellectuals were attacked. The literary and art circles responded immediately. At that time, Ding Ling was the editor of the literature and art column of "Liberation Daily". This column published a series of defensive articles around March, arguing that there were hierarchical systems and suppression of speech in Yan'an at that time. These included "The March 8th Festival" (March 9), Ai Qing's "Understanding Writers, Respecting Writers" (March 11), Luo Feng's "The Age of Essays" (March 12), Wang Shiwei's "Age" Wild Lily" (March 13, 23), and Xiao Jun's "On the "Love" and "Endurance" of Comrades (April 8). These articles were later criticized, and although Ding Ling had resigned by March 12, she was also implicated.

In 1942, Ding wrote the essay Commemorating Xiao Hong in Wind and Rain, in which she grieved for the premature death of Xiao Hong, the execution by the KMT of early CCP leader Qu Qiubai, and the political suspicion against her friends Feng Xuefeng and Hu Feng.

Ding participated in the Yan'an Forum on Literature and Art, which sought to provide a new theoretical and practical basis for the development of cultural work amid the Chinese Communist Revolution.

In February 1942, Ding Ling married Chen Ming, the president of Yan'an Fenghuo Opera Club. Ding Ling was 13 years older than Chen Ming, and the relationship was the source of much discussion.

In Spring 1943, the Yan'an Rectification Movement intensified. Ding was assigned to the first sector of the CCP's Central Party School for cadre investigation and ideological reform. During this time, Ding for the first time disclosed the note she had written to the KMT during her captivity. Having not disclosed the note during the prior 1940 investigation, Ding was the subject of intense political scrutiny. In Spring 1944, she left the Central Party School and took a writing position at the Shanganning Border Region Culture Association.

In August 1945, Central Party School committee members drafted a "Preliminary Conclusion" which described the note that Ding had written to the KMT as a remorse letter for her involvement with the CCP. The "Review Team's Preliminary Conclusions on Ding Ling's Historical Issues" also stated: "There are materials to prove that there is no suspicion of Ding being dispatched by the Kuomintang. But whether the serious ideological problems during this period were affected by the softening of the Kuomintang after the arrest, Comrade Ding Ling deeply reflected on himself. After the rectification, there has been progress." Before Ding left Yan'an later that year, and not yet knowing of the preliminary conclusion, she spoke with Ren Bishi regarding her concerns about the pending investigation. Ren stated that Ding had the Party's full faith.

While Ding was criticized during the Yan'an Rectification Movement, Mao endorsed her writing. He stated that Thoughts on March 8 was a valuable critique of the CCP and offered good suggestions for cadres. Mao contrasted Ding's work with Wang Shiwei's stating that Ding was a comrade while Wang was a Trotskyist. Mao also wrote Ding a letter praising her 1944 article Tian Baolin, which discussed the titular labor hero. The historical record is not clear on whether Mao (or Ren Bishi) were aware of either Ding's letter to the KMT or the Preliminary Conclusion during this period.

Following the Yan'an Rectification Movement, Ding adjusted her writing style and increased focus on workers, peasants, and soldiers are the subjects of her work.

== Land reform and The Sun Shines Over Sanggan River ==
In early October 1945, Ding and other Yan'an writers marched more than 2,000 miles on foot to Zhangjiakou, the then-capital of the Jin-Cha-Ji Border Area. During this time she lived in the office of the "Jin-Cha-Ji Daily" and devoted herself to writing. On March 12, 1946, she became the editor of the bimonthly magazine "Northern Culture", and took up various other literary roles.

In the summer of 1946, land reform came underway in CCP-controlled regions of China, and Ding Ling joined the land reform team organized by the Jin-Cha-Ji Central Bureau which traveled around various towns in the region to implement land reform in the region. During the land reform, the Chinese Civil War had broken out and Ding had to retreat back to Zhangjiakou and later to Red Earth Mountain in Fuping County.

This experience was the inspiration for Ding's primary work during these years, the novel The Sun Shines Over Sanggan River, which was completed in 1948. The book was awarded the Stalin prize for Literature in 1952, and is considered one of the best examples of socialist-realist fiction. It depicts class struggle and land reform with poor peasant protagonists. When recalling the motivation for the creation of this novel, Ding wrote: "Because I have lived with these people and fought together, I love this group of people and this life, and I want to keep them in real life, on paper."

Unlike the fictionalized village depicted in The Sun Shines Over Sanggan River which enjoys its liberation, the village on which Ding based her novel was captured by the Nationalists shortly after Ding's land reform work team left. According to Ding, her beloved peasants "suffer[ed] reprisals from despotic landlords" after the village's capture.

== Life in the early People's Republic of China ==
After 1949 proclamation of the People's Republic of China, Ding took up several important cultural and literary posts in the new government. These posts included editor-in-chief of the Journal of Art and Literature, the official platform for the CCP's literary policies.

In 1949 and 1950, Ding criticized the base tastes of much popular literature, but also recognized that revolutionary literature was not yet well-developed. She called for the rejection of "the vulgar and outmoded butterfly literature style," but also emphasized that it was necessary to "do research on the interests of readers" in order to "keep[] the masses in mind." Ding favored worker-peasant-soldier literature and art but recognized that this form was "not yet very mature."

In 1950, Ding founded the Literary Lecture Institute, one of the most widely-known programs for to encourage and develop workers to write.

In 1954, Ding was awarded the second prize of the Stalin Prize for Literature for "The Sun Shines on the Sanggan River", and in 1954, Ding was elected to the PRC's first National People's Congress.

== Purge and exile ==
In 1955, Ding's former League of Left-Wing Writers colleague Hu Feng, who helped her escape from Nanjing to Shanghai in 1936, underwent a massive purge, with claims that he was leading a "Hu Feng Counter-Revolutionary Clique". Under the political climate, Ding criticized Hu in a critical article "Where Do Enemies Come From", which was published in the People's Daily on May 23, 1955, No. 3. Hu was later sentenced to prison for 14 years and would not be rehabilitated until 1979.

Ding was criticized during the Sufan Movement for allegedly forming an anti-party clique with Chen Qixia. In 1955, Lu Dingyi submitted a report detailing Ding's perceived faults to the Central Committee. Mao reviewed the report and approved the Central Publicity Department's creation of a group to investigate Ding's historic issues, including the note she had written to the KMT in 1933.

In August 1956, Ding Ling filed a response to the allegation that she had formed an anti-party clique. As part of her response, she criticized Zhou Yang for his extramarital affair. Ding's criticism of Zhou was widely circulated among CCP officials. Zhou alleged that Ding was unchaste and not loyal to the CCP. Although in 1957 Zhou apologized for going too far in his allegation, he remained a lifelong political opponent and critic of Ding.

On 24 October 1956, the Central Publicity Department released The Conclusion of the Investigation on Comrade Ding Ling's Historical Issues, which stated that Ding had engaged in an act of betrayal while held captive by the KMT in Nanjing. Ding filed an appeal.

In 1957 the Anti-Rightist Campaign started. Zhou reversed his position from his apologies earlier that year and again alleged that Ding was disloyal. In September 1957, Mao denounced Ding and described her as a bourgeois intellectual who should be expelled from the party.

On January 26, 1958, Ding Ling was denounced in a special edition of "Re-Criticism" published by the government "Literature and Art Newspaper". Mao Zedong personally edited the note and criticized Ding Ling and other writers by name many times, calling to mind the note she wrote while in Nanjing:

"What are you to criticize again? Wang Shiwei's "Criticism" Wild Lily, Ding Ling's "Feelings of the March 8th Festival", Xiao Jun's "On the "Love" and "Endurance" of Comrades, Luo Feng's "The Age of Essays", Ai Qing's "Understanding Writers and Respecting Writers", and several others. The above-mentioned articles were all published in the literary and artistic supplement of the "Liberation Daily" in Yan'an. Ding Ling and Chen Qixia presided over this supplement. Ding Ling's novel "When in the Hospital" was published in 1941 in The Yan'an literary publication "Gu Yu" was renamed "In the Hospital" the following year and republished in Chongqing's "Literary and Art Front". The articles by Wang Shiwei, Ding Ling, and Xiao Jun were used by the Kuomintang spy agency as anti-communist propaganda at that time.... Ding Ling wrote a letter of surrender in Nanjing and betrayed the proletariat and the Communist Party to Chiang Kai-shek. She concealed it and deceived the trust of the party.... The articles of Ding Ling, Wang Shiwei and others helped the Japanese imperialists and the Chiang Kai-shek reactionaries..."

After publication of the article, Ding was politically isolated. In May 1958, the CCP expelled her.

Ding Ling and her husband Chen Ming were sent to exile in the Great Northern Wasteland in Manchuria for 12 years. In 1970, they were sent to Beijing Qincheng Prison. Five years later, the CCP Central Committee's investigative team released a report which increased Ding's criminal classification from a "surrenderer" to a "traitor". The investigative team had received no new evidence. Ding was then sent to a remote village near Changzhi where she lived for four years.

Academic Benjamin Kindler writes that Ding rejected the idea of victimhood from her time in northeast exile. Years later, she wrote regarding her arrival on a state farm and contending with unruly chickens, "I wanted to labor, so how could I be afraid of those chickens?" Addressing her experiences during the Cultural Revolution period, Ding wrote, "I believe that when people engage in common labor it is possible to generate a shared feeling. Labor can break down those barriers erected by human beings and bridge the heart melodies of the self and the other. This was what I desired."

== Later years ==
In 1979, Ding was politically rehabilitated. Her return to Beijing and the fact that she was no longer deemed a rightist were the subject of major news reporting.

A few years before her death, Ding was allowed to travel to the United States where she was a guest at the University of Iowa's International Writing Program. Ding Ling and her husband Chen Ming visited Canada in 1981 for 10 days, meeting with Canadian writers Margaret Laurence, Adele Wiseman, and Geoff Hancock; and even Canada's first female Lieutenant Governor, Pearl McGonigal for the province of Manitoba.

On 14 July 1984, the CCP issued The Notification Regarding the Restoration of Comrade Ding Ling's Reputation. It stated that Ding had remained a loyal member of the party during her captivity by the KMT in Nanjing and affirmed that the result of the 1940 investigation had been correct.

Ding authored more than three hundred works. After her political rehabilitation many of her previously banned books such as her novel The Sun Shines Over The Sanggan River were republished and translated into numerous languages. Some of her short works, spanning a fifty-year period, are collected in I Myself Am A Woman: Selected Writings Of Ding Ling.

In her introduction to Miss Sophie's Diary And Other Stories, Ding Ling explains her indebtedness to the writers of other cultures:

I can say that if I had not been influenced by Western literature I would probably not have been able to write fiction, or at any rate not the kind of fiction in this collection. It is obvious that my earliest stories followed the path of Western realism... A little later, as the Chinese revolution developed, my fiction changed with the needs of the age and of the Chinese people... Literature ought to join minds together... turning ignorance into mutual understanding. Time, place and institutions cannot separate it from the friends it wins... And in 1957, a time of spiritual suffering for me, I found consolation in reading much Latin American and African literature.

On 14 July 1984, the Organization Department of the Chinese Communist Party issued The Notification Regarding the Restoration of Comrade Ding's Reputation. Receiving the news while she was in the hospital, Ding stated, "Now I can die."

In July 1985, Ding was hospitalized in Beijing. During her hospitalization, she wrote her essay The Song of Death. Ding recounts in the essay the deaths that affected her life, both those of relatives and of revolutionary martyrs, and explains why she sought to live a full life rather than die in martyrdom.

Ding Ling died in Beijing on March 4, 1986.

== Death ==
Ding died on 4 March 1986. Chen sought approval from the Central Committee of the Chinese Communist Party for Ding's body to be covered with the CCP flag but was denied. Her body was instead covered with a red flag gifted by friends from the Great Northern Wasteland, embroidered with the words "Ding Ling is immortal".

Ding Ling's memorial essay was drafted by Bao Chang, the secretary of the Chinese Writers Association Secretariat.

On 15 March 1986, Ding Ling's funeral ceremony was held at Babaoshan Revolutionary Cemetery Memorial Hall.

Ding's posthumously published Living Among Wind and Snow (1987) contains Ding's reflections on her life.

== In popular culture ==
In 2014, Hao Lei played Ding Ling in Ann Hui's biopic of Xiao Hong's life, The Golden Era.

== Works ==
=== Collections ===
- Zai hei’an zhong [In the Darkness]. 1928.
- Zisha riji [Diary of a Suicide]. 1928.
- Yige nüren [A Woman]. 1928.
- Shujia zhong [During the Summer Holidays]. 1928.
- Awei guniang [The Girl Awei]. 1928.
- Shui [Water]. 1930.
- Yehui [Night Meeting]. 1930.
- Zai yiyuan zhong [In the Hospital]. 1941.
- Ding Ling wenji [Works of Ding Ling], Hunan Renmin Chubanshe. 6 vols. 1982.
- Ding Ling xuanji [Selected Works of Ding Ling], Sichuan Renmin Chubanshe. 3 vols. 1984.

=== Fiction ===
- Meng Ke. 1927.
- Shafei nüshi riji. February 1928, Xiaoshuo yuebao (short story magazine); as Miss Sophia's Diary, translated by Gary Bjorge, 1981.
- Weihu. 1930.
- Muqin. 1930; as Mother, translated by Tani Barlow, 1989.
- 1930 Chun Shanghai. 1930; as Shanghai, Spring, 1930, translated by Tani Barlow, 1989.
- Zai yiyuan zhong. 1941; as In the Hospital, translated by Gary Bjorge, 1981.
- Wo zai Xia cun de shihou. 1941; as When I Was in Xia Village, translated by Gary Bjorge, 1981.
- Taiyang zhao zai Sanggan he shang. Guanghua shudian. September 1948; as The Sun Shines Over Sanggan River, translated by Gladys Yang and Yang Xianyi, Panda Books, 1984.
- Du Wanxiang. 1978; as Du Wanxiang, translated by Tani Barlow, 1989. Ding began the fictional piece, which was based on a person Ding met in the Great Northern Wastes and chronicles her development as a communist worker, in 1965 and re-wrote it in 1977.

== See also ==
- Thoughts on March 8
- When I was in Xia Village
- Sanggan River

== Footnotes ==
- Reference Guide to World Literature (3rd ed.). St. James Press. 2002. pp. 274–275. ISBN 978-1-55862-490-0.
- Ebrey, Patricia. Cambridge Illustrated History of China. Cambridge University Press, June 13, 1996. ISBN 0-521-43519-6
- Solomon, Barbara H., "Other Voices, Other Vistas", A Mentor Book, March 1992
