= Thoughts on March 8 =

1942 work by Ding Ling

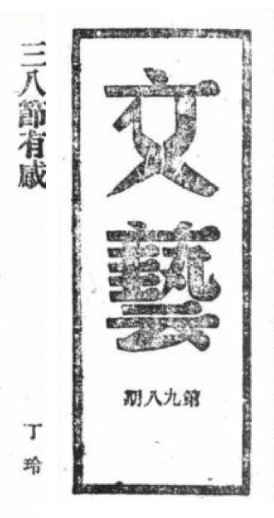
- Header of Thoughts on March 8, including: author, title, section of Liberation Daily, and date of issue
- Author: Ding Ling
- Original title: 三八节有感
- Language: Chinese
- Publisher: Jiefang Ribao (解放日报）
- Publication date: May 1942
- Publication place: China

Thoughts on March 8 (Simplified Chinese characters: 《三八节有感》) was written in 1942 by Ding Ling, wherein she discusses her thoughts on politics and the role of women in China in the context of March 8, Women's Day. The essay was originally published in Liberation Daily (解放日报 - jiěfàng rìbào), a newspaper that Ding Ling edited. She understood the Chinese Communist Party's (CCP) policies surrounding women's rights to be inconsistent and insufficient. Ding Ling further criticizes the double standard between men and women surrounding social issues such as divorce, abortion, and remaining unmarried. She invites women to strengthen themselves against the oppression that they face, as well as advocating for the CCP to act on liberating women through creating a discussion on the topic as well as monitoring their own "moral conduct."

The essay garnered much negative attention from within the CCP, thus forcing Ding Ling to rescind her statements. Her statements were part of the reason behind Mao Zedong's policies discussed in his Talks at the Yan’an Forum on Literature and the Arts.

== Historical context ==
As a member of the May Fourth Movement generation of writers, Ding Ling's evolution in writing reflected her transition from Republican to Socialist China. By the time she wrote Thoughts on March 8, Ding Ling's writing demonstrated both the untenability of Western Feminism and the struggles that Chinese women faced at that time, as, despite her beginnings as an author writing feminist fiction, her writings, ultimately, strayed from fundamental feminist elements.

Meanwhile, the importance of writers in the CCP was promoted once the party began the Yan'an Communism experiment in the late 1930s. Due to this, the CCP aimed to attract prominent writers - primarily May Fourth literati - and make them submissive to the Party. Some scholars attribute the claims that Ding Ling penned in Thoughts on March 8 as being directly in response to a conflict surrounding the collaboration between May Fourth literati and the CCP. The CCP was in the midst of deciding whether they should recruit the literati as an association of writers that would disperse propaganda (especially to counter opposition from the right, who accused the CCP of oppressing literati and literature), or whether they should harness the writers’ power to sway the educated but unpolitical youths.

Liberation Daily soon published critical essays (杂文 - záwén), whose topics included Party leadership, their public actions, and the morals of the population. In addition to this, Ding Ling's involvement in China's Executive Committee of the Congress to celebrate International Women's Day (March 1939), Association for the Promotion of Women's Constitutional Rights (1940), and in the selection of the Model Women of the Border Region as a representative of the China Writers Association (1940) prefaced Ding Ling's eventual penning of the critical Thoughts on March 8, a piece which some scholars see as demonstrating her upholding her morals and perspectives.

Finally, Thoughts on March 8 also reflects May Fourth Feminism, as it reinterpreted the discussion surrounding feminine responsibilities amidst a “revolutionary world,” through its examination of women's rights through the lenses of “universal suffrage, legal rights, and equal access to the public domain.”

== Summary ==
Ding Ling prefaces her essay by emphasizing that the women of Yan’an and other areas under Communist control have better lives than Chinese women elsewhere. However, she does put the onus on the CCP, saying: “It would be better if there were less empty theorizing and more talk about real problems, so that theory and practice would not be divorced, and better if all CCP members were more responsible for their own moral conduct.” Furthermore, Ding Ling critiques the CCP's opinion that the women of Yan'an are completely free. She notes that women in Yan'an are compelled to marry and have children while also having Party obligations and a revolutionary mindset. Similarly, Ding Ling notes that women are condemned for not wanting children, as, in society, having children was an inevitable part of marriage. With this in mind, Ding Ling demonstrates that all women - even those who prioritize raising their children, as they were obligated to as a wife - are, ultimately, confined to an identity of "backwardness."

Ding Ling credits her ability to tell the truth - a skill she adopted due to her “revolutionary credentials, her life as a Communist, and her gender” - as to why she gives herself the role as being the spokesperson for all women. Some scholars, such as Alber, read Ding Ling as being the protagonist of her essay, as it represents her own socio-political perspectives on women and women's rights.

Ding Ling covers topics surrounding Chinese women's liberation. Firstly, she analyzes the category of woman as an “essential entity,” as the characteristics often correlated with femininity such as “irrationality, willfulness, regret, romanticism, and love of illusion” are not necessarily negative; women are criticized no matter what they do, whether they act virtuously or not and are oppressed despite their equal rights in name, so the negativity surrounding these traits is primarily due to their association with femininity. The examples Ding Ling evokes to support her thesis that women are not afforded the same rights as men include the right to remain unmarried, the right to abortions, and the right to divorce. In regard to women's right to divorce, Ding Ling asserts that it is more often the husband who desires it, as, if a woman were to seek divorce, “she must be leading an immoral life, and then of course she deserves to be cursed.” Ding Ling also creates a dichotomy between Chinese "old society" and modern society. She notes that, in the "old society," women would have been "pitied and considered unfortunate," but, in modern society, women are blamed for their "backward" decisions. As such, Ding Ling posits that the double standard between males and females on the question of morality in the modern era is in favour of the male, causing detriment to the women's reputation because she was “equal and had choices”, and, therefore, brought her fate onto herself.

Finally, Ding Ling notes that "people without ability" are weak, which is why she ends her essay with four-fold life advice for the reader to follow in order to strengthen themselves. Firstly, it was necessary to not fall ill; Ding Ling opines that it is vital that a woman takes care of her health, rather than embarking on a "wild life", which can jeopardize one's health. Furthermore, it was important to ensure one's happiness, as it gave one's life meaning and puts one in the position to help others. Thirdly, one must consistently use one's brain in order to determine the validity and correctness of one's ideas and decisions, and whether they conform to one's morals. Finally, “resolution in hardship” and “perseverance to the end” was necessary, as people who are collective-minded rather than individualistic are able to benefit the world and “persevere to the end.”

Ding Ling's solution to this situation is a communal one (as some scholars, such as Feng, note, “applying the Marxist interpretation of the relationship between the individual and society”), as both men and women must band together through their shared desire to improve their social environment. However, Ding Ling also notes that women must not wait to be saved, but must “first strengthen themselves” instead of “issue[ing] a call for women's passive submission to the Party as their saviour.” Furthermore, Ding Ling asserts that women must break free of anything that stands in the way of their liberation, even if that includes the CCP. Women should initially align their interests alongside Party pillars, but women may “have no alternative but to define themselves against the set parameters of theory, against the current line.” As such, Ding Ling renders women a “social and political category just as ‘proletariat’ is”, therefore positioning the category of "women" as a “legitimate point of theoretical struggle.”

Finally, Ding Ling laments how women's ideas are not taken seriously. In a postscript to the essay, Ding Ling says that the ideas she has penned in this essay will be criticized solely because she is a woman, so her essay was written with likeminded people in mind as her audience. Indeed, she posits that, her ideas, if spoken by "a leader before a big audience," would "evoke satisfaction," therefore demonstrating the notion of the double standard between men and women that is discussed throughout her essay.

== Reception and cultural impact ==
Thoughts on March 8 garnered a lot of criticism, especially from the CCP, primarily spurred by Ding Ling's separation of “woman” as a separate, oppressed entity as well as “her self-image as a representative of women fighting against any oppressive force.” The CCP aimed to combine the liberation of women with that of the Chinese people as a whole in the face of the Japanese and Nationalist armies. Ding Ling's association with and sympathy towards the uniquely oppressed category of “women'' challenged this notion, as Ding Ling could be seen to advocate for rebellion against the collective. Ding Ling was criticized by several CCP members, including Cao Yi'ou (the wife of Kang Sheng) and He Long. He Long offered a scathing critique of her writing, accusing her of “maligning the party.” However, Mao Zedong described Thoughts on March 8 as containing some “constructive recommendations” from comrade Ding Ling (differentiating her from Wang Shiwei, who he deemed a “Trotskyite”).

Ding Ling, alongside other writers (including Bo Gu) were to renounce their critiques. Ding Ling's apology for her essay included criticism of similarly outspoken writers, as well as criticism of her own tone; she apologized for her strong and totalizing language, saying that she had only “spoken for a portion of the people and had not taken the position of the party as a whole,” and that the essay “only pointed out some of the darker aspects and neglected to affirm the bright road ahead.” Furthermore, Ding Ling admitted that her words may have contributed towards sentiments of disunity, especially due to her critical view towards authorities. Finally, Ding Ling's apology included the acknowledgement and revocation of two critical points in her essay. The first point was that of representation in the feminist movement. Ding Ling clarified that, though she said in her essay that the fight for women's liberation is a women's fight and that women were to strengthen themselves against their oppressors, in actuality, men were also necessary in this fight, as, since they were a sizeable portion of the population, they were an integral component in the success of the women's liberation movement. The second point that Ding Ling thought she discussed unsatisfactorily was that, though she prefaced her essay discussing the strength of women's rights in Yan’an, she painted a different picture throughout the essay, therefore causing her words to mislead people away from reality.

The revocation of her controversial points in Thoughts on March 8 was followed up by Ding Ling's resignation from Liberation Daily. Ding Ling's conformation to CCP rules after her apology led her to several CCP opportunities, including participating in international “goodwill missions”, controlling rectification campaigns (including those of Wang Shiwei and Xiao Jun), and editing the Literary Gazette (文艺报 - wényì bào).

Ding Ling's, along with other “petty bourgeois" writers', criticisms of the CCP was what partly spurred Mao Zedong's Talks at the Yan’an Forum on Literature and the Arts as Mao quickly worked to refine his policy, enforcing strict guidelines surrounding literature. Such guidelines included associating writers and their work to a state-run literature bureaucracy, therefore leading to the approved literature of the Party representing idealized CCP realities, as seen through CCP propaganda. These realities (such as the depiction of marriage and divorce and representation in the women's fight for liberation) were to be perceived as “inflexible matters of correct or incorrect literary representation” rather than “flexible debatable issues of cultural politics.'' These policies have remained integral in Party policy surrounding literature for the past forty years.

Some scholars cast doubt on the sincerity of Ding Ling's apology, deeming it “half-hearted.” One reason was due to Ding Ling's hesitance to publish Thoughts on March 8; the essay was published a year after it had been written, therefore suggesting that Ding Ling was aware that the essay was controversial and threatened Party norms and policies but nonetheless publishing it, therefore actively disregarding said controversy and potential threat. However, other scholars see Ding Ling's apology as genuine, as it reflects a shift in her mentality towards that of Maoist ideology.

== See also ==
Ding Ling

Miss Sophia's Diary

When I was in Xia Village

Women writers in Chinese literature

League of Left-Wing Writers

== Bibliography ==
- Alber, Charles J. Embracing the Lie: Ding Ling and the Politics of Literature in the People's Republic of China. Westport, CT: Praeger Publishers, 2004.
- Alber, Charles J. “The New Democracy.” In Enduring the Revolution: Ding Ling and the Politics of Literature in Guomindang China, 135–53. Westport, CT: Praeger, 2001.
- Barlow, Tani. The Question of Women in Chinese Feminism. Durham: Duke University Press, 2004.
- Ding, Ling, Tani E. Barlow, with Gary J. Bjorge. I Myself Am a Woman: Selected Writings of Ding Ling. Boston, MA: Beacon, 1989.
- Feng, Jin (2004). New Woman in Early Twentieth-Century Chinese Fiction. Purdue University Press. ISBN 978-1-61249-888-1. Project MUSE book 10833.
- Feuerwerker, Yi-Tsi Mei (1984). "In Quest of the Writer Ding Ling". Feminist Studies. 10 (1): 65–83. doi:10.2307/3177896. JSTOR 3177896. ProQuest 1295954428.
- Goldman, Merle. Modern Chinese Literature in the May Fourth Era. Cambridge, MA: Harvard University Press, 1977.
- Qin, Linfang. 丁玲的最后37年. Beijing, ROC: Zhongguo wen shi chu ban she (中国文史出版社), 2005.
- Wang, Xiaoping. Contending for the "Chinese Modern": the Writing of Fiction in the Great Transformative Epoch of Modern China, 1937-1949. Boston, MA: Brill, 2019.
