= Hu Yepin =

Chinese writer (1903–1931)

Hu Yepin 胡也频
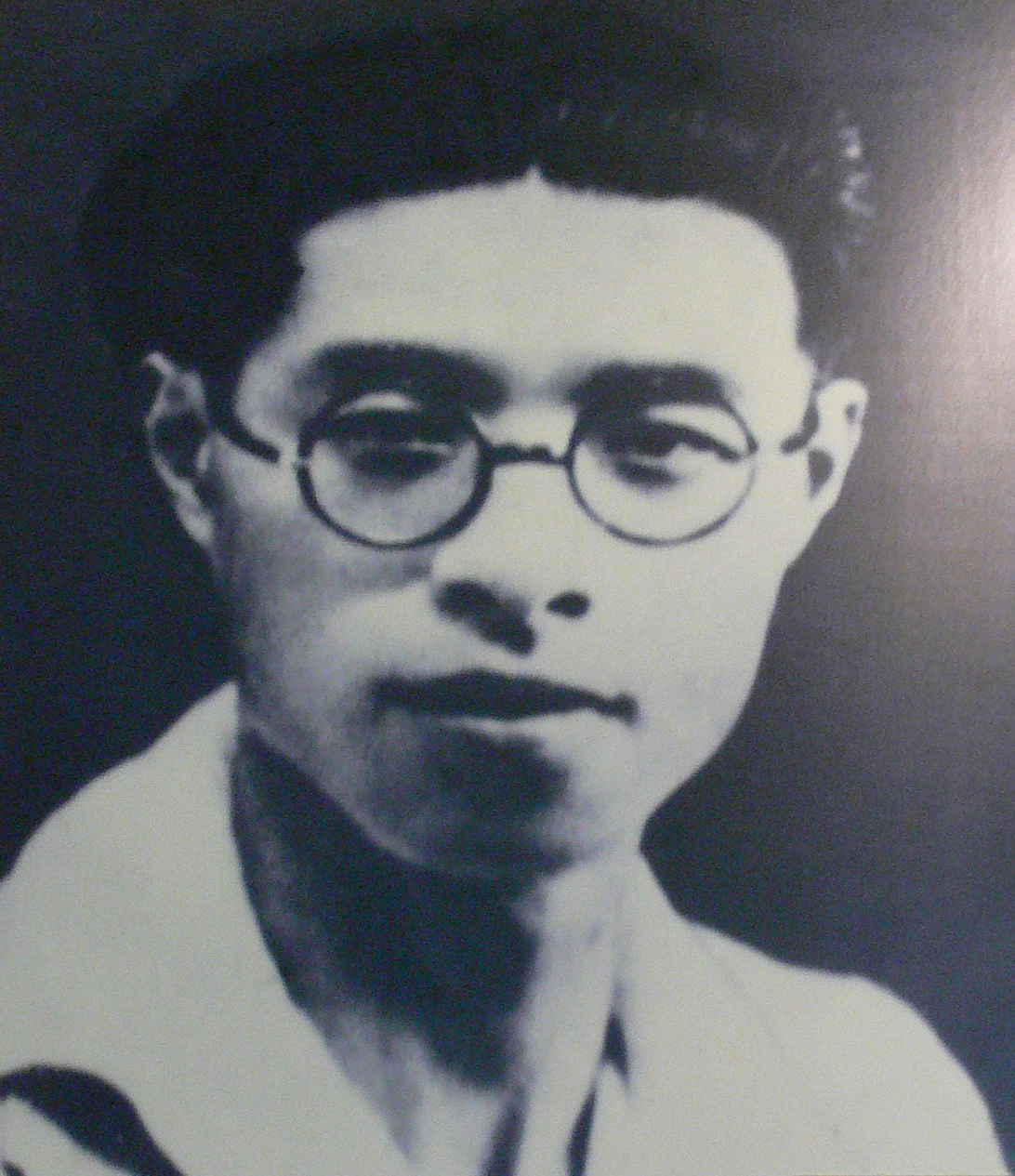
- Hu in 1930.
- Born: Hu Peiji; 4 May 1903; Fuzhou, Fujian, China
- Died: 7 February 1931 (aged 27); Longhua, Shanghai
- Occupations: Writer, poet, and playwright
- Spouse: Ding Ling
- Children: Hu Xiaopin
- Writing career
- Language: Chinese

Hu Yepin (Chinese: 胡也频; Wade–Giles: Hu Yeh-p'in; 4 May 1903 – 7 February 1931) was a Chinese writer, poet, and playwright. Hu was a member of the League of Left-Wing Writers and was executed in February 1931 by the Kuomintang government along with other writers such as Li Weisen.

Hu was the first husband of the celebrated writer Ding Ling, who was also a member of the League of Left-Wing Writers, and a close friend of the writer Shen Congwen.

== Life and career ==
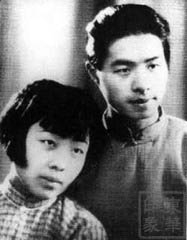
Hu Yepin and Ding Ling in 1926

Hu Yepin was born as Hu Peiji (胡培基) on 4 May 1903 in Fuzhou, Fujian province. He had four younger brothers and a younger sister. At age 15 he began working as an apprentice of a goldsmith.

In 1920 Hu moved to Shanghai, where he attended Pudong High School, and changed his name to Hu Chongxuan (胡崇轩). A year later he went to Tianjin to study at the Dagukou navy academy. However, the navy academy was shut down soon afterwards, and he drifted to nearby Beijing. He changed his name again to Hu Yepin.

In the summer of 1924, Hu met Ding Ling, who had recently arrived in Beijing from Shanghai. They fell in love and became unofficially married in 1925.

At the end of 1928, Hu, Ding, and their close friend, writer Shen Congwen, left Beijing for Shanghai. The trio founded the Red and Black Publishing House and its journal Red and Black. The venture was unsuccessful, and closed soon afterwards. To repay his debts, Hu accepted a teaching job at the provincial high school in Jinan, the capital of Shandong province, in 1929. According to linguist Ji Xianlin, who was a student at the high school, the arrival of Hu Yepin and his fashionable wife Ding Ling from Shanghai caused a sensation at the school.

In May 1930, the Kuomintang government ordered the arrest of Hu for his pro-Communist teaching. Hu and Ding were forced to leave Jinan and returned to Shanghai, where they joined the League of Left-Wing Writers, which had just been established two months before. Hu served as an executive committee member of the League.

In November 1930, Hu joined the Chinese Communist Party (CCP). In the same month, Ding Ling gave birth to a boy named Hu Xiaopin (胡小频), who was later renamed Jiang Zulin (蒋祖林) after Hu Yepin's death, using Ding Ling's real surname Jiang.

== Arrest and execution ==
In September 1930, the Kuomintang leader Chen Lifu formally banned the League of Left-Wing Writers. Orders were also issued to arrest its members. The League was driven underground.

On 17 January 1931, while attending a secret CCP meeting at the Oriental Hotel in the Shanghai International Settlement, Hu was arrested along with other attendees by the British police.

When Hu failed to return home, Ding Ling and Shen Congwen searched frantically for him. A day later, Shen received confirmation that Hu had been arrested by the British police and extradited to the Kuomintang, and was imprisoned in Longhua, suburban Shanghai, where many Communists were held. Shen and Ding sought help from prominent intellectuals including Hu Shih, Xu Zhimo, Cai Yuanpei, and Shao Lizi, who lobbied Chen Lifu and the Shanghai mayor Zhang Qun for Hu's release, all to no avail.

On 7 February 1931, the Kuomintang executed 23 Communists in Longhua, including three women, one pregnant. Hu Yepin was one of the five members of the League executed on that day, along with Rou Shi, Li Weisen, Yin Fu, and Feng Keng. Together they are remembered as the Five Martyrs of the League of Left-Wing Writers by the CCP.

The circumstances of Hu's arrest along with other communists had been controversial. However, most publications in China and Taiwan now agree that they were betrayed by members of a rival Communist faction, possibly Wang Ming and his close associates, Gu Shunzhang and Tang Yu.

== Works ==
Hu Yepin's early writings, such as Where to Go (往何处去), were semi-autobiographical, reflecting his sense of despair over the widespread poverty and hopelessness that were prevalent in China during the 1920s. A Pearl in the Brain (活珠子) was one of his most highly regarded works. Hu was one of the few among the May Fourth writers who wrote in the then-new vernacular Chinese language with ease.

In 1930, the year he joined the Chinese Communist Party, and shortly before his execution, he published the novella To Moscow (到莫斯科去) and the novel A Bright Future (光明在我们的前面).

== Bibliography ==
- Louie, Kam (1997). The Literature of China in the Twentieth Century. Columbia University Press. ISBN 9780231110846.
- Wong, Wang-Chi (1991). Politics and Literature in Shanghai: The Chinese League of Left-Wing Writers. Manchester University Press. ISBN 0-7190-2924-4.
- Ying, Li-hua (2009). Historical Dictionary of Modern Chinese Literature. Scarecrow Press. ISBN 9780810870819.
