= Guangci =

Guangci may refer to:

- Guangci–Fengtian Temple metro station, a station of the Taipei Metro
- Guangci Hospital
- Guangci Temple (廣慈寺), the South Pagoda outside Shenyang's former outer wall
- Emperor Guangci of Dali (廣慈帝), the native name Duan Sicong (段思聰), the fourth Emperor of the Kingdom of Dali (928 – 968)
- Jiang Guangci (1901 – 1931), a Chinese fiction writer
