= Roushi =

Roushi may refer to:

- Rōshi (老師), a title for teachers in Zen Buddhism
- Rōnin or Rōshi (浪士), samurai without masters in feudal Japan
- Rou Shi (1902–1931), Chinese left-wing writer

== See also ==
- Master Roshi, fictional character from the Dragon Ball series
