= Rou Shi =

Chinese writer

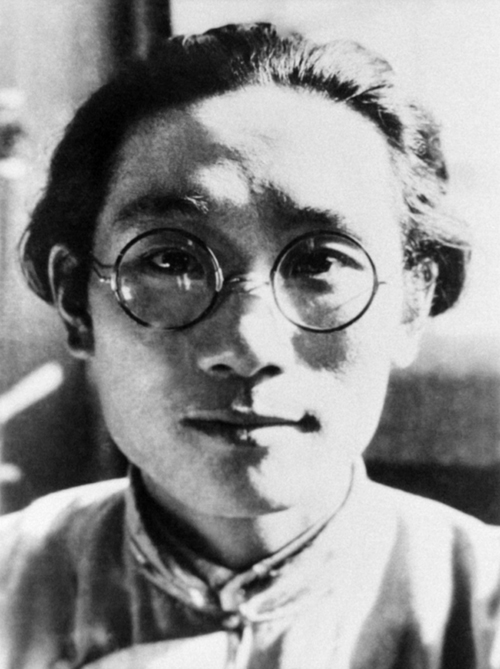
- Rou Shi in the 1920s.
- Born: Zhao Pingfu (赵平复); 28 September 1902; Ninghai County, Zhejiang, China
- Died: 7 February 1931 (aged 28); Longhua, Xuhui District, Shanghai
- Occupation: Writer
- Children: Two sons and a daughter
- Writing career
- Pen name: 柔石
- Language: Chinese
- Notable works: February; A Slave Mother

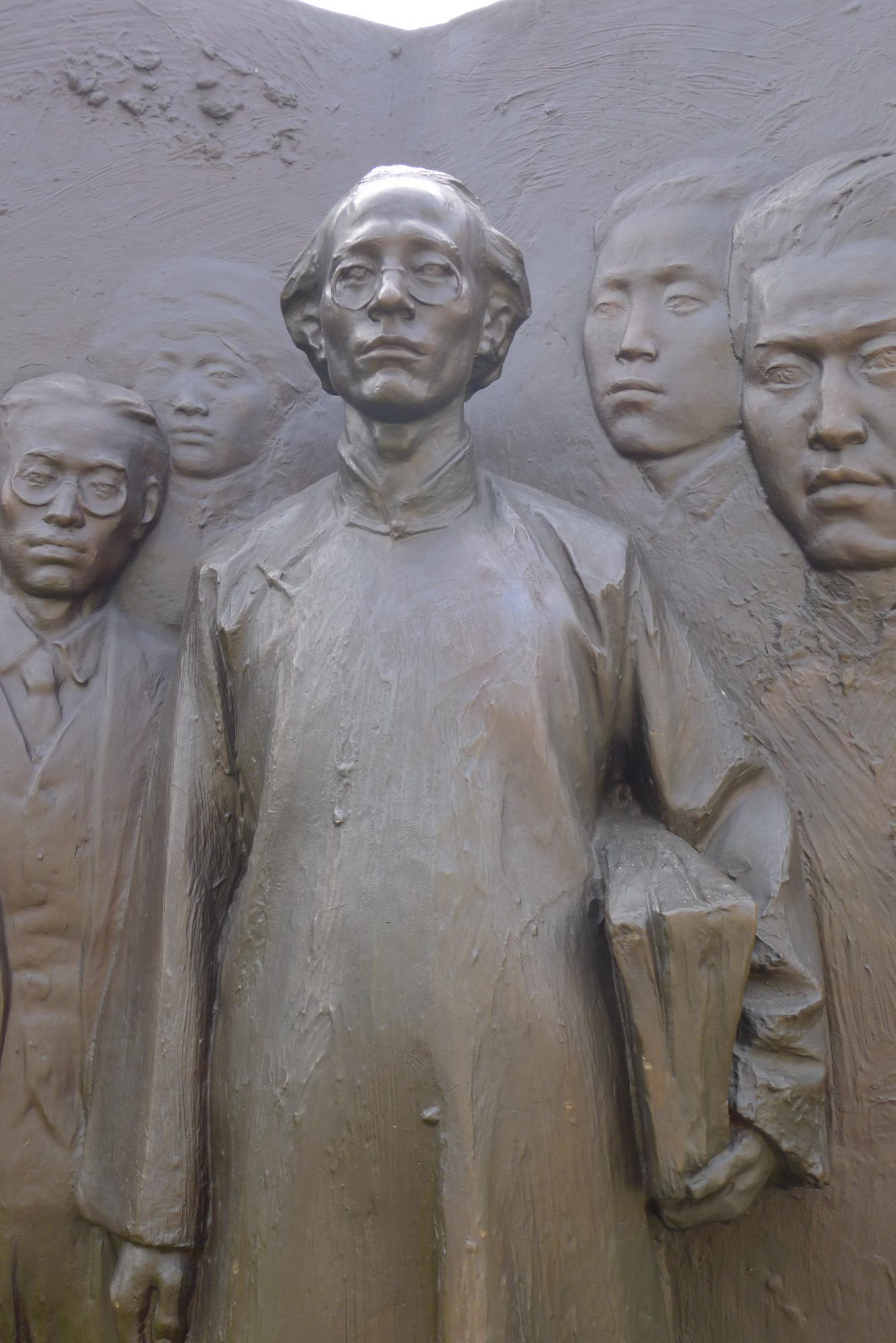
Bronze sculpture of Rou Shi on Duolun Road, Shanghai

Rou Shi (Chinese: 柔石; pinyin: Róu Shí; Wade–Giles: Jou Shih; 28 September 1902 – 7 February 1931) was a prominent left-wing Chinese writer and member of the May Fourth Movement. Executed on either 7 or 8 February 1931 by the Kuomintang government in Shanghai for his pro-Communist activities, he is considered one of the Five Martyrs of the League of Left-Wing Writers.

== Early life and career ==
Rou Shi was born Zhao Pingfu (赵平复) on 28 September 1902 in Ninghai County, Zhejiang. In 1918 he entered Hangzhou No. 1 Normal School in the provincial capital Hangzhou. After graduating in 1923, he became a teacher at Pudi Elementary School in Cixi City. In 1925 he published his first collection of short stories, Madman.

In 1925 Rou Shi studied briefly at Peking University, but returned to Zhejiang in the spring of 1926, teaching in Hangzhou and Zhenhai. In the summer of 1927 he returned to his hometown Ninghai and taught at Ninghai High School, a local Communist base. After the failed Communist rebellion in May 1928, he took refuge in Shanghai, where he was introduced to the leading leftist writer Lu Xun, who lived nearby. Together with Lu Xun and others, he cofounded the Morning Flower Society (朝花社), which published several progressive journals. Lu Xun stated that the purpose of the Society was to "introduce literature from Eastern and Northern Europe and import foreign woodcuts." In January 1929 Rou Shi succeeded Lu Xun as the editor of the journal Tattler. During this period he wrote the novel February (二月) and another collection of short stories entitled Hope (希望). He also translated works by foreign writers such as Maxim Gorky.

In March 1930, the League of Left-Wing Writers was established in Shanghai. Rou Shi attended its inaugural meeting, and became an executive and standing committee member in charge of the League publication Meng Ya (萌芽). He joined the Chinese Communist Party (CCP) in May 1930, and published the short story, "A Slave Mother" (为奴隶的母亲).

== Arrest and execution ==
On 17 January 1931, while attending a secret CCP meeting at the Oriental Hotel in the Shanghai International Settlement, Rou Shi was arrested, along with 35 other attendees, by the Shanghai Municipal Police. They were handed over to the Kuomintang government and held in prison for three weeks. On 7 February 1931, the Kuomintang executed 23 CCP members in Longhua, Shanghai. The five members of the Left League executed on that day, Rou Shi, Li Weisen, Hu Yepin, Yin Fu, and Feng Keng, are called the Five Martyrs of the League of Left-Wing Writers by the CCP. Among the executed were three women, one pregnant. They were executed either by gunshot or by being buried alive. According to Frank Moraes, Rou Shi was in the latter group, but an article on Xinhua says he was killed by gunshots. In the essay "Remembrance for the Sake of Forgetting" (为了忘却的纪念), Lu Xun states that Rou Shi was shot ten times.

== Select bibliography ==
=== Works in English ===
- "A Wife's Farewell" (别, 1929), translated by Di Fan
- "A Slave Mother" (为奴隶的母亲, 1930), translated by Edgar Snow (1936)
- Threshold of Spring (二月, 1929), translated by Sidney Shapiro (1980)
  - "Destruction" (摧残), in Threshold of Spring (1980)
  - "A Hired Wife" (为奴隶的母亲, 1930), in Threshold of Spring (1980)

=== Works in Chinese ===
Short story collections

- Madman (疯人, 1925)
- Slave (奴隶, 1928)
- Hope (希望, 1930)

Novels

- Death of the Old Times (旧时代之死, 1926)
- February (二月, 1929)
- Three Sisters (三姐妹, 1929)

Dramas

- Comedy of the World (人间的喜剧)

Nonfiction

- Curse (诅咒, 1925)
- A Strong Impression (一个伟大的印象, 1930)
- Child Stealing Fruit (偷果子的小孩)
- Choosing a Place To Die (死所的选择)
- Seeing the Doctor (就诊)
- A Youngster Selling Pens (卖笔的少年)
- Tricked (上当)
- A Dream of White (一个白色的梦)
- June Benefactor (六月的赐惠者)

Poetry

- "War!" (战！, 1925)
- "Blood Is Boiling" (血在沸, 1930)
- "Autumn Wind Comes from the West" (秋风从西方来了)

== Translations and adaptations ==
One of Rou Shi's best known short stories, A Slave Mother, was first translated to English by Edgar Snow in 1936. In 1963, February was adapted to the critically acclaimed film Early Spring in February, which was directed by Xie Tieli and starred Sun Daolin, Shangguan Yunzhu, and Xie Fang. In 2003, A Slave Mother was adapted to a television film starring He Lin, who won the Best Actress award of the 2005 International Emmy Award for her performance in the film.

== Memorials ==
On the 100th anniversary of his birth in 2002, Rou Shi's hometown, Ninghai, restored his former residence and opened it as a museum in his memory. The county also opened the newly built Rou Shi Park covering an area of 250 mu.

== Bibliography ==
- Hamilton, John Maxwell (2003). Edgar Snow: A Biography. Louisiana State University Press. ISBN 978-0807129128.
- Johnson, Kay Ann (1985). Women, the Family, and Peasant Revolution in China. University of Chicago Press. ISBN 978-0226401898.
- Moraes, Frank (1953). Report on Mao's China. MacMillan. ASIN B000L312QC.
- Wong, Lawrence Wang-Chi (1991). Politics and Literature in Shanghai: The Chinese League of Left-Wing Writers. Manchester University Press. ISBN 0-7190-2924-4.
- Ye, Tan; Zhu, Yun (2012). Historical Dictionary of Chinese Cinema. Scarecrow Press. ISBN 978-0810867796.
