= Mei Zhi =

Chinese writer

Mei Zhi 梅志
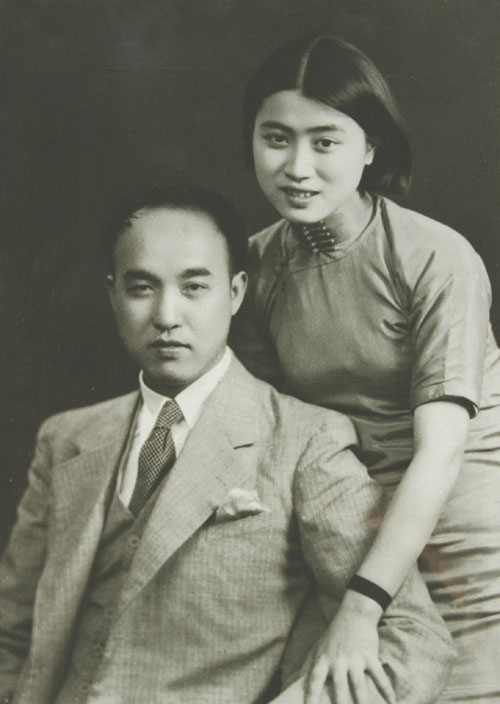
- Zhi Mei in 1933 with Hu Feng
- Born: Tu Qihua (屠玘華); 22 June 1914; Nanchang, Jiangxi, Republic of China
- Died: 8 October 2004 (aged 90); Beijing, People's Republic of China
- Education: Shanghai Peiming Girl's Middle School
- Occupations: Children's author, biographer, essayist, memoirist
- Spouse: Hu Feng (m. 1933; died 1985)
- Writing career
- Pen name: Mei Zhi (梅志), Tu Qi (屠琪), Tu Ji (屠棘)
- Notable works: The Tale of Little Red Riding Hood's Escape (小红帽脱险记); Within High Walls (在高墙内); Pepper is Red (花椒红了)

Mei Zhi
- Traditional Chinese: 梅志
Transcriptions
Standard Mandarin
- Hanyu Pinyin: Méi Zhì
- Bopomofo: ㄇㄟ˙ㄓ˙
- Wade–Giles: Mei Chih

Mei Zhi (22 June 1914 – 8 October 2004) was a Chinese children's author and essayist.

== Biography ==
Mei Zhi was born in Nanchang, Jiangxi, the eldest daughter of three children. Mei joined the League of Left-Wing Writers in Shanghai in 1932. She met another member of this group, Hu Feng, in 1933 when he returned after being deported from Japan and the two married at the end of the year. The two lived in Shanghai, where their home became a meeting place for other members of the League of Left-Wing Writers. Mei published her first volume in 1934 titled Shoushang zhi ye(Chinese: 受伤之夜).

During the Second Sino-Japanese War, Mei moved with her family first to Wuhan, then to Chongqing. Whilst they moved, Hu increased the number of publications of his literary magazine Qi Yue (Chinese: 七月), which Mei copy-edited. Mei also edited the magazine Xiwang (Chinese: 希望). In 1941, Mei fled with her family to Hong Kong, which soon fell to the Japanese, after which they went to Guilin. By 1946, the family reached Shanghai, where Mei stayed with their three children until 1949.

=== Arrest ===
In May 1955, both Mei and Hu were arrested for counter-revolutionary activities. Mei's alleged crime was that she had transcribed Hu's book Sanshi fangyan (Chinese: 三十方言). She was released in 1961 after the death of her mother, but was only permitted to visit Hu in prison in 1965. Hu was released in late 1965 and was sent to live in Chengdu in early 1966, accompanied by Mei, under surveillance by the Sichuan Municipal Public Security Department. In August, with the onset of the Cultural Revolution, the two were taken to a prison camp that produced tea in Lushan County, Sichuan. Later, Hu was imprisoned, and frequently fell ill, thus Mei was taken to the prison at Dazhou and made to nurse him.

=== Rehabilitation ===
In 1979, Mei was rehabilitated and allowed to return to Chengdu. In 1980, Mei was given official permission to take Hu to Beijing, in order to help his increasingly serious mental illness. Hu died in 1985, after which Mei wrote several memoirs detailing his experiences in prison.

Mei joined the China Writers Association in 1982.

== Written works ==
=== Children's literature ===
- 梅志童话诗集 [An Anthology of Mei Zhi's Children's Tales] (in Chinese). Hunan: Hunan Shaonian Ertong Chubanshe. 1984.
- 中国童话百家：听来的童话 [Many Schools of Chinese Children's Stories: Tales I Heard] (in Chinese). Beijing: Zhongguo Shaonian Ertong Chubanshe. 1991.
- 小麵人求仙紀 [Tale of Little Noodle Who Sought an Immortal] (in Chinese). Guilin: Guilin Sanhu Tushushe. 1943.

=== Memoirs ===
- F: Hu Feng's Prison Years. Translated by Gregor Benton. London: Verso. 2013. ISBN 978-1-84467-967-6.
- 胡风沉冤录 [A Record of the Injustices against Hu Feng]. Beijing: Kexue Chubanshe. 1989.
- 胡风传 [A Biography of Hu Feng] (in Chinese). Beijing: Beijing Shiyue Wenyi Chubanshe. 1998. ISBN 978-7-5302-0483-2.
- 在高墙内 [Within High Walls] (in Chinese). Beijing: Gongren Chubanshe. 1989.
- 伴囚记 [Record of Accompanying a Prisoner] (in Chinese). Beijing: Gongren Chubanshe. 1988.

== Legacy ==
Mei was portrayed by Yuan Quan in the 2014 film The Golden Era.
