= Hu Feng =

Chinese Marxist writer, poet and literary theorist

- 胡风
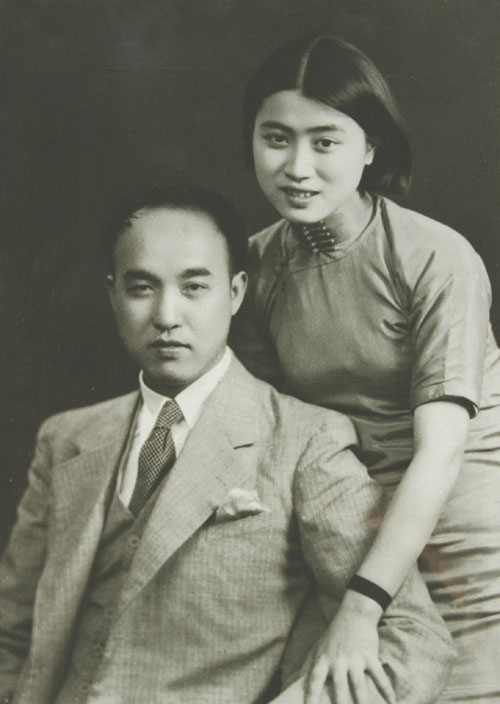
- Hu Feng and his wife Mei Zhi, December 1933
- Born: Zhang Guangren (Chinese: 张光人); November 2, 1902; Qichun, Hubei, Qing Empire
- Died: June 8, 1985 (aged 82); Beijing, PRC
- Occupations: Literary Theorist, Writer, Poet
- Spouse: Mei Zhi

Chinese name
- Traditional Chinese: 胡風
- Simplified Chinese: 胡风
Transcriptions
Standard Mandarin
- Hanyu Pinyin: Hú Fēng

Personal name
- Traditional Chinese: 張光人
- Simplified Chinese: 张光人
Transcriptions
Standard Mandarin
- Hanyu Pinyin: Zhāng Guāngrén

Hu Feng (Chinese: 胡风; pinyin: Hú Fēng, November 2, 1902 – June 8, 1985) was a Chinese Marxist writer, poet and literary theorist. He was a prominent member of the League of Left-Wing Writers. After the founding of the People's Republic of China, Hu Feng became a member of the First National People's Congress of China, but was then heavily persecuted as the chief of the Hu Feng Counter-revolutionary Clique (Chinese: 胡风反革命集团). The persecution became a massive political purge. He was first rehabilitated in 1980 and fully rehabilitated, posthumously, in 1988.

== Life ==
=== Early life ===
Hu Feng was born in Qichun, Hubei on November 2, 1902, as a son of a toufu artisan. He started school in his village in 1913 and entered middle school in Wuchang, capital of Hubei, in 1920. He transferred to the High School Affiliated to the National Southeastern University (Chinese: 国立东南大学附属中学, now High School Affiliated to Nanjing Normal University), which was also the school of writer Ba Jin. He joined Socialist Youth League of China there.

=== Education ===
In 1925, Hu Feng participated in the May Thirtieth Movement, and entered Peking University later in the year. In 1926, he transferred to study western literature at Tsinghua University. Soon he quit school and returned to his hometown. He later served in the Kuomintang. In 1929, he entered Keio University in Japan to study English. Then, in 1933, he was evicted from Japan for organizing anti-Japanese groups among fellow Chinese students.

=== Literary activism ===
Hu Feng returned to Shanghai in 1933 and became both the head of publicity and the executive secretary of the League of Left-Wing Writers. He became closely acquainted with Lu Xun. In 1934, he married Mei Zhi. In 1935, he secretly edited the journal Mu Xie Wen Cong (Chinese: 木屑文丛, literally "The Sawdust Journal"), which was published with the help of Kanzō Uchiyama. In 1936, he co-founded and co-edited the journal The Petrel (Chinese: 海燕) with others, which published the works of Lu Xun and other authors including Nie Gannu, Xiao Jun, and Wu Xiru (Chinese: 吴奚如).

After the Second Sino-Japanese War broke out in 1937, Hu Feng became the chief-editor of the magazine July (Chinese: 七月). According to Ruth Y.Y. Hung, "Hu and his associate writers, the July poets, made paradigmatic distinctions between new and old, free verse and national forms, and, by extension, poetry-driven revolution... and poetry for the Revolution." Due to the war, Hu Feng moved the publication of July to Wuhan in October 1937, and to Chongqing in September 1938. Hu Feng stayed for a year in Guilin from March 1942 to March 1943, and returned to Chongqing after then. In 1945, Hu Feng became the chief-editor of the magazine Hope (Chinese: 希望).

After the founding of the People's Republic of China in 1949, Hu Feng became a member of the China Federation of Literary and Art Circles, a member of the China Writers Association, and a member of the First National People's Congress of China. During this time, he wrote the poem Time Has Begun (Chinese: 时间开始了), which is a lengthy historical epic celebrating the founding of the PRC.

=== Political persecution ===
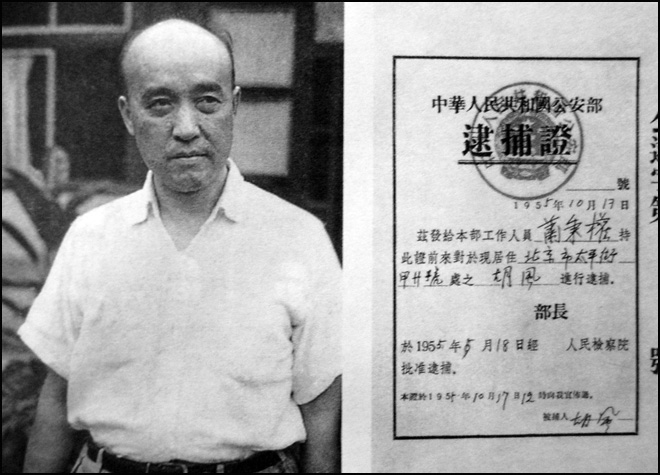
Left: Hu Feng in 1954; Right: Hu Feng's arrest warrant, issued by the China's Ministry of Public Security in 1955

Hu Feng's literary theory often conflicted with those of orthodox Chinese Communists in ideology such as Zhou Yang and of Mao Zedong, especially on the issue of "National Form" (Chinese: 民族形式). Ruth Y.Y. Hung observed that, "For Hu, any type of formulism in general, and traditional and popular national forms specifically, derived from a Confucius 'ruling-class' ethic and had no prerogative claim on New Poetry." In the 1940s and 1950s, Hu Feng's theory was criticized frequently.

In 1951, some wrote to Wen Yi Bao, requesting that it critique Hu Feng's literary theory again. In early 1952, Wen Yi Bao publicized these letters.

In July 1954, Hu Feng delivered a 300,000-word report, titled "Report on the Real Situation in Literature and Art Since Liberation", to the Politburo of the Chinese Communist Party. In January 1955, the Publicity Department of the Chinese Communist Party submitted a report to the Central Committee of the Chinese Communist Party (CCCPC) requesting that it criticize Hu Feng.

In early May 1955, Shu Wu (Chinese: 舒芜) submitted his correspondence with Hu Feng and other materials, accusing Hu of forming anti-revolutionary cliques. Mao wrote a foreword to Shu Wu's letters and materials and instructed People's Daily to publish them under the title "Certain Materials Regarding the Hu Feng Counter-revolutionary Clique" (Chinese: 关于胡风反党集团的一些材料). On May 17, Hu Feng was then arrested. He was detained at Qincheng Prison specified for political criminals, and in 1965 he was sentenced to 14 years in prison. Chinese authority claims that about 2,100 people were persecuted, 92 were arrested, and 72 were detained concerning Hu. Among them, 78 were confirmed as a member or accomplice of the "Hu Feng Counter-revolutionary Clique", and 23 were regarded as key members.

During the following Cultural Revolution, Hu Feng and his wife were sent to Lushan, Sichuan for labor re-education. Hu Feng was again arrested in November 1967. In January 1970, Hu Feng was accused of desecrating the portrait of Mao and was sentenced for life.

=== Rehabilitation and death ===
In 1979, Hu Feng was released from prison. In September 1980, he was partly rehabilitated when the CCCPC overturned its decision on the "Hu Feng Counter-revolutionary Clique", yet CCCPC did not overturn previous accusations towards Hu Feng. He was then made a standing member of the Chinese People's Political Consultative Conference and restored as a member of the China Federation of Literary and Art Circles and a member of the China Writers Association.

Hu Feng died of cancer in Beijing on June 8, 1985. China's Ministry of Public Security cancelled some of his accusations in April 1986, and CCCPC cancelled all accusations in June 1988.

== Works and translations ==
Besides his occupation as an editor, Hu Feng was also a translator and literary theorist. In 1935, Hu Feng translated Yang Kui's story The News Deliverer (新聞配達夫, Shinbun Haitatsufu) from Japanese into Chinese (Chinese: 送报夫). He also translated some stories written in Japanese by authors from Taiwan and Korea, which are altogether published in the collection Shan Ling ("The Mountain Spirit", Chinese: 山灵) in April 1936.

Hu Feng published several theoretical works in the 1940s. In 1941, he published Lun Minzu Xingshi Wenti ("On National Forms", Chinese: 论民族形式问题). In 1943, he published Minzu Zhanzheng Yu Wenyi Xingge ("The National War and the Disposition of Literature and Art", Chinese: 民族战争与文艺性格). In 1948, he published Lun Xianshizhuyi De Lu ("On the Road of Realism", Chinese: 论现实主义的路).

== See also ==
- Lu Xun
- Zhou Yang
- League of Left-Wing Writers
- Sufan movement

== Further readings ==
- Denton, Kirk A. The Problematic of Self in Modern Chinese Literature: Hu Feng and Lu Ling (Stanford University Press, 1998).
- Hung, Y.Y. Ruth, Hu Feng: A Marxist Intellectual in a Communist State, 1930–1955 (SUNY Press, 2020).
- Shu, Yunzhong, Buglers on the Home Front: The Wartime Practice of the Qiyue School (SUNY Press, 2000).
- Zhi, Mei, F: Hu Feng's Prison Years (Verso, 2013).
