= League of Left-Wing Writers =

Organization of writers formed in Shanghai, China

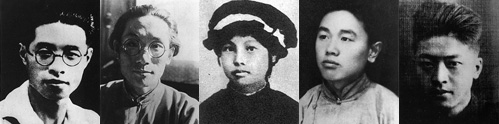
Five members who were executed, from left: Hu Yepin, Rou Shi, Feng Keng, Yin Fu, Li Weisen (Li Qiushi)

The League of Left-Wing Writers (Chinese: 中國左翼作家聯盟; pinyin: Zhōngguó Zuǒyì Zuòjiā Liánméng), commonly abbreviated as the Zuolian in Chinese, was founded in Shanghai on 2 March 1930 and subsequently established branches in Beijing, Tianjin, and Tokyo, Japan. Upon creation, the group had over 50 members, many of whom were also members of the Chinese Communist Party. The league eventually grew to have an estimated count of over 400 members. Due to danger from the Kuomintang party and the common threat of betrayal from within the league, the league kept no records of its membership and was structured in cells of four to five members. Within the cells, members were only allowed contact with their immediate supervisor.

== History ==
Before the official inauguration of the league, a preparatory committee of twelve members was formed by the Central Committee of the Chinese Communist Party of the Publicity Department of the Chinese Communist Party. The preparatory committee members included, Lu Xun, Rou Shi, Feng Xuefeng, Xia Yan, Jiang Guangci, Hong Lingfei, Zheng Boqi, Feng Naichao, Qian Xingcun, and probably Dai Pingwan and Pang Keng. All members of this committee were members of the Chinese Communist Party, with the exception of Lu Xun.

The preparatory committee deemed the following four kinds of behavior unacceptable:

1. Sectarianism and even individualism.
2. Incorrect methods of criticism--failure to adopt scientific methods and attitudes in literary criticism
3. Inability to take notes of the real enemies
4. Neglect of the role of literature in assisting political movements

In addition to these unacceptable behaviors, the committee assigned three roles to writers:

1. Destruction of the old society and all its ways of thought
2. Propagation and promotion of the ideals of a new society
3. Establishment of new literary theories

The league's inauguration was held at the Chinese Arts University on March 2, 1930. Lu Xun delivered the opening address to the organizational meeting where he criticized the bourgeois writers of the Crescent Moon Society. Left-Wing Writers not only active in the literary field, but also played an important role in other cultural organizations.

After the establishment of the League of Left-Wing Writers in March 1930, the Central Committee of the Chinese Communist Party successively established other left-wing cultural groups such as the Social Scientists Union, the Left-Wing Dramatists Union, the Left-Wing Journalists Union, and multiple film and music groups. All of these groups and unions were assimilated into a parent organization, the All-China Left-Wing Cultural Federation (Chinese: 中国左翼文化总同盟; pinyin: zhōngguó zuǒyì wénhuà zǒng tóngméng), which was established by the Cultural Committee in Shanghai in October 1930.

Due to the leagues strong affiliation with the Chinese Communist Party, it was quickly banned in September 1930 by the Kuomintang party, and arrests were issued for the league's members. On 7 February 1931, the Kuomintang party executed five members of the League: Li Weisen (Chinese: 李伟森; pinyin: Lǐwěisēn), Hu Yepin, Rou Shi, Yin Fu (Chinese: 殷夫; pinyin: Yīn fū), and Feng Keng, in the White Terror period that followed the 1927 Shanghai massacre. They were among 24 Communist Party members and sympathizers arrested while meeting in Shanghai. The executed league members became known as the "Five Martyrs of the Left League." Some have suggested that the meeting have been betrayed by others in the Communist Party, perhaps as a result of a power struggle.

The League was disbanded voluntarily in 1936. This was mainly in order to encourage authors to unite across political boundaries and face the rapidly increasing threat from Japan.

== Activities ==
The purpose of the League was to promote socialist realism in support of the Communist Revolution, and it eventually became very influential in Chinese cultural circles. To accomplish this goal, the league launched new magazines, seminars, and study groups. The League articulated theories on the political role of literature that foreshadowed Mao's influential Yan'an Talks on Literature and Art, and engaged in running debates with the "art for art's sake" Crescent Moon Society.

In June 1930, the Nationalist Literature Movement was founded with influence from the Kuomintang. In June 1931, under the leadership of Qu Qiubai, the league began an attack on the Nationalist Literature Movement, where a series of articles were written by Qu Qiubai, Lu Xun, and Mao Dun.

In 1931, the league's executive committee passed "The New Missions of Chinese Proletarian Revolutionary Literature" which placed greater importance on literature and set a clear political agenda for the league.

During that period, New Culture writers established several literary groups, such as the Mangyuan Society (Chinese: 莽原社; pinyin: mǎngyuán shè), Weiming Society (Chinese: 未名社; pinyin: wèi míng shè), and Chaohua Society (Chinese: 朝花社; pinyin: cháo huā shè), and published related literary magazines like Sprout Monthly, Pioneer, and Literary Journalism. These publications were founded with the purpose of uniting their efforts against the Crescent Moon Society writers like Hu Shi, Xu Zhimo, and Liang Shiqiu, whom they saw as representatives of the "oppressive class" in literature. These publications played a significant role in the Left-Wing Writers' League period, exerting considerable influence but eventually were all banned by the Kuomintang government.

Other well known literary works produced by members of the league include Mao Dun's "Midnight" (Chinese: 子夜; pinyin: zǐyè) and the league's magazine titled "The Dipper". (Chinese: 北斗; pinyin: Běidǒu)

In 1932, Qu Qiubai argued that the revolutionary literature movement could not progress if writers could not find an understandable and universal Chinese language to use. Shortly after, debates within the party began on this topic, with Mao Dun and Lu Xun forming arguments against Qu Qiubai. Despite the disagreements, a notable shift towards the proposals popularized by Qu Qiubai eventually took hold.

== Notable members ==
- Lu Xun
- Ding Ling
- Mei Zhi
- Hu Feng
- Zhou Yang (literary theorist)
- Hu Yepin
- Rou Shi
- Feng Keng
- Guo Moruo
- Yu Dafu
- Mao Dun
- Tian Han
- Hong Shen
- Qu Qiubai

== See also ==
- Union of Soviet Writers
- Union of Chinese Writers
- League of American Writers
- International Union of Revolutionary Writers
