= Qian Xingcun =

Chinese writer and literary critic (1900–1977)

- Born: Qian Defu (钱德富); 6 February 1900; Wuhu, Anhui, Qing China
- Died: 17 June 1977 (aged 77)
- Other names: A Ying (阿英)
- Occupation(s): Author, literary critic

Chinese name
- Traditional Chinese: 钱杏邨
- Simplified Chinese: 钱杏村
Transcriptions
Standard Mandarin
- Hanyu Pinyin: Qián Xìngcūn
- Wade–Giles: Ch`ien^{2} Hsing^{4}ts`un^{1}

Qian Xingcun (simplified Chinese: 钱杏村; traditional Chinese: 钱杏邨; pinyin: Qián Xìngcūn, 6 February 1900 – 17 June 1977), also known by the pen name A Ying (阿英), (Note: Other attested pennames include Qian Qianwu (钱谦吾), Zhang Ruoying (张若英), Ruan Wuming (阮无名), Ying Sun (鹰隼), Wei Ruhui (魏如晦), and Zhang Fengwu (张凤吾) (Duan 2022).) was a Chinese literary critic, author, and screenwriter. Born in Wuhu, Anhui, Qian moved to Shanghai in 1918 to attend the Shanghai Zhonghua Industrial College. Following the May Fourth Movement, he began writing extensively as a member of the leftist Sun Society and League of Left-Wing Writers; he also joined the Chinese Communist Party (CCP) in 1926. He penned several screenplays for the Mingxing Film Company in the 1930s as well as reviews of contemporary Chinese literature, which were followed during the Second Sino-Japanese War by anti-Japanese periodicals and stage plays. Having occupied prominent positions in the People's Republic of China since its establishment, he was persecuted during the Cultural Revolution.

Qian produced three collections of short stories, two poetry collections, a lengthy narrative poem, and four stage dramas, as well as several film scripts. In his literary criticism, he promoted a concept of "proletarian realism" – a communal and activist style of class-conscious literature. He was critical of fellow leftist writers Lu Xun and Mao Dun, while upholding Jiang Guangci as an early proponent of revolutionary literature.

== Biography ==
=== Early life and political activism ===
Qian was born Qian Defu (simplified Chinese: 钱德富; traditional Chinese: 錢德富) on 6 February 1900 in Wuhu, Anhui. After some time delivering the post, in 1918 he enrolled at the Department of Civil Engineering at the Shanghai Zhonghua Industrial College (now the Shanghai Jiao Tong University). During the May Fourth Movement of 1919, Qian was an active proponent of cultural reform, being a delegate to the Shanghai Student Congress and editing the Shanghai Student Union's daily newsletter.

Qian dropped out of college in late 1920, returning to Anhui and becoming a teacher at several local schools. In 1926, Qian joined the Chinese Communist Party (CCP). After the failure of the Autumn Harvest Uprising in 1927, Qian returned to Shanghai, where he became part of the All-China Federation of Trade Unions' propaganda department.

=== Writing activities ===
Qian began publishing writings in the Wanjiang New Wave, a supplement of the Wanjiang Daily, as well as the Emancipation Pictorial in 1920. Later, as a founding member of the Sun Society, Qian wrote extensively on matters of literature. In the late 1920s, he was part of a broad discourse on the revolutionary literature movement and its leadership, which saw the leftist Creation and Sun societies writing extensively on the merits of their own allies. With the Sun society, he also helped establish the magazine Sun Monthly (太陽月刊) in 1928. In mid-1928, the societies began having joint meetings, and relations became more harmonious afterwards.

These collaborations contributed to the establishment of the Chinese Authors Association in December 1928, with which Qian served as a supervisory committee member. The organization, associated with the CCP, was short-lived, with notable tensions between Creation and Sun society members. Another attempt at a united front followed some time later, with the League of Left-Wing Writers established in 1930; Qian was one of the twelve preparatory committee members.

Through his friendship with Zhou Jianyun of the Mingxing Film Company, Qian brought several Communist writers to the studio. He also penned numerous screenplays. These included The Year of Harvest (1933), The Uprising (1933, co-authored with Zheng Boqi), Children of Our Time (1933, with Xia Yan and Zheng Boqi), Three Sisters (1934), and The Classic for Girls (1934, with Xia Yan, Zheng Zhengqiu, and Hong Shen).

Also in the 1930s, Qian began to compile information on Chinese writers from the Ming and Qing dynasties as well as those active in the contemporary Republic of China. Based on this research, he produced Women Writers in Modern China (1933) and Two Talks on the Novel (1958). He was laudatory of Su Xuelin, describing her as China's greatest writer of prose. Another work, published as Volume 10 in A Compendium of New Chinese Literature (1936), provided a list of more than 200 Chinese-language translations of literary texts published through 1929.

=== Later life ===
With the commencement of the Second Sino-Japanese War in 1937, Qian established a series of periodicals that advocated for armed resistance to the invading Imperial Japanese Army. These included the Salvation Daily, for which he continued to write after its headquarters moved to Guangzhou, as well as the Li Sao and the Wen Xian. Qian also penned several plays that promoted nationalist ideals and condemned the invading Empire of Japanese. Four of his plays produced in this period dramatized the heroes of the Southern Ming era, including Ge Nenniang, Zhang Cangshui, and Zheng Chenggong. Another highlighted the Qing-era Taiping Rebellion.

Ultimately, Qian fled Shanghai in 1941 to avoid arrest. Travelling to Jiangsu, he found refuge with the New Fourth Army and began editing several periodicals. These included Jianghuai Culture, New Knowledge, and New Land (a supplement to the Yanfu Daily). With the conclusion of the war in 1945, Qian held several positions, including as director of the Huazhong Literary Association, the dean of the School of Literature, Huazhong Construction University (now part of Shandong University), and the secretary of the East China CCP's Cultural Committee.

In May 1949, Qian moved to Beijing, where he helped organize the All-China Congress of Literary and Art Workers. After the establishment of the People's Republic of China, he was involved in several literary organizations in Tianjin including the Federation of Literary and Art Circles and the Municipal Bureau of Culture. He also edited a volume on folk literature. During the Cultural Revolution, Qian faced political persecution. He died of cancer on 17 June 1977.

== Analysis ==
Qian's literary output includes three short story collections (Stories of Revolution [革命的故事], The Grave [义冢], and Malusha [玛露莎]), the novella A Whip Mark (一条鞭痕), two poetry collections (The Hungry Man and the Hungry Eagle [饿人与饥鹰] and The Wasteland [荒土]), the narrative poem Eve of the Storm (暴风雨的前夜), and four stage dramas (Blue Blood Flowers [碧血花], Heroes of the Sea [海国英雄], The Story of Yang E [杨娥传], and King Li Chuang [李闯王]). He also produced guidelines for researching literature, a treatise on literary theory, as well as studies of opera novels, Chinese comics, and literary newspapers.

Kun Qian of Cornell University identifies a moralizing tendency in Qian wartime works, an appeal to the "moral essence" of the Chinese people that transcends time. Qian argues that this is most evident in the biography of Zheng Chenggong, wherein the general is shown turning against his father to uphold the Ming dynasty while simultaneously attempting to observe filial piety by allowing his patriarch an escape. The moral standing of these leaders was further supported by the modernization of female characters' roles in their societies, with the historical Zheng Chenggong's concubine being depicted as his daughter. In his films, Qian frequently criticized conditions in the Republic of China, thereby condemning the ruling Kuomintang government.

Borrowing the concept of "proletarian realism", first espoused in the Soviet Union, Qian advocated for a class-conscious style of literature that was communal and activist. This he contrasted with "bourgeois realism" (i.e., naturalism), which he decried as individualistic and stagnant as well as rooted in the assumption that writers could reach beyond their class origins. Such literary discourses continued through the late 1930s, with Qian emphasising the need to "critically depict the inevitable and necessary reality and complete the task of knowing the life outside the institutional life." Within the context of class consciousness, Qian identified the 1925 May Thirtieth Movement as a watershed moment in such class-conscious literature, writing:

After the May Thirtieth Incident, the class positions in China suddenly underwent a great change. The class power of workers and peasants were shown up gradually. At this time, the long awaiting fourth class literature began to rise.

In his discussion of revolutionary literature, Qian identified Jiang Guangci as being at the forefront of the movement, having published the article "Proletarian Revolution and Culture" (無產階級與文化) in 1924 – two years before the Creation society's candidate Guo Moruo published his "Revolution and Literature" (革命與文學).

Qian was also critical of fellow leftist writers. He declared that Lu Xun provided little more than an "'empty pity' for the downtrodden", with his article "The Dead Era of Ah Q" (死去了的阿Q时代) arguing that The True Story of Ah Q (1921–1922) represented a naive peasant who failed to capture the revolutionary spirit of the modern era. Mao Dun, meanwhile, was characterized as using obsolete literary forms to tell overly dark stories. Responding to Qian's critique that his Eclipse (1927–1928) offered "'nothing but the sick and bewildered attitudes' of young intellectuals", Mao responded that he had sought primarily to express his own disillusionment. In 1929, Qian was instructed by the CCP to stop his attacks on Lu Xun.

== Selected works ==
- A Ying (阿英) (1960). 晚清文学丛钞 [Literature of the Late Qing] (in Chinese). Beijing: Zhonghua Book Company.
- A Ying (阿英) (1999). 阿英全集 [The Complete A Ying Collection] (in Chinese). Hefei: Anhui Jiaoyu Chubanshe.

== Works cited ==
- Anderson, Marston (1990). The Limits of Realism: Chinese Fiction in the Revolutionary Period. Berkeley: University of California Press. ISBN 978-0-520-06436-2.
- Chan, Leo Tak-Hung (2001). "What's Modern in Chinese Translation Theory? Lu Xun and the Debates on Literalism and Foreignization in the May Fourth Period". TTR: Traduction, Terminologie, Rédaction. 14 (2): 195–223. doi:10.7202/000576ar.
- Duan Congxue (段从学) (20 January 2022). 钱德富 [Qian Xingcun]. Encyclopaedia of China (in Chinese) (3rd ed.). Archived from the original on 17 November 2024.
- Kowallis, Jon Eugene von (2010). "The Enigma of Sue Xuelin and Lu Xun" (PDF). Literature and Philosophy (16): 493–528. Archived from the original (PDF) on 11 June 2024.
- Luebering, J.E. (5 February 2009). "Aying". Encyclopaedia Britannica. Archived from the original on 8 October 2024.
- Qian, Kun (2009). Empire Without End: Imperial History Printed, Staged, and Screened in Modern China, 1900–Present (PhD thesis). Ithaca: Cornell University. Archived from the original on 1 July 2024.
- Song, Chris (2023). "The Trope of Life in Hong Kong Poetry: Realism, Survival, and Shenghuohua" (PDF). Writing Chinese: A Journal of Contemporary Sinophone Literature. 2 (1): 88–105. doi:10.22599/wcj.45.
- Wong, Wang-chi (1986). "The Left League Decade": Left-Wing Literary Movement in Shanghai, 1927–1936 (PDF) (PhD thesis). London: School of Oriental and African Studies. Archived from the original (PDF) on 13 June 2024.
- Xiao, Zhiwei (1998). "Ah Ying". In Zhang, Yingjin; Xiao, Zhiwei (eds.). Encyclopedia of Chinese Film. New York, London: Routledge. p. 79. ISBN 978-0-415-15168-9.
