= Miss Sophia's Diary =

1927 confessional fictional diary by Ding Ling

- Traditional Chinese: 莎菲女士的日記
- Simplified Chinese: 莎菲女士的日记
Transcriptions
Standard Mandarin
- Hanyu Pinyin: Shāfēi nǚshì de rìjì
- Wade–Giles: Sha-fei nü-shih te jih-chi

Miss Sophia's Diary, or The Diary of Miss Sophie, is a confessional fictional diary by the Chinese author Ding Ling written in 1927. The story confides around a young woman who has tuberculosis and has left her family for Beijing. She struggles with her identity and the story describes her life through first person diary entries. This type of writing can give impressions of the daily struggle of a modern woman in China. The entries consist of her thoughts and emotions, in particularly about her relationships, sexuality and feelings towards her inner desires.

== History ==
"Miss Sophia's Diary" was written in 1927 and first published in the influential Early Republic of China "Fiction Monthly" (小说月报). Ding Ling named the main character after Sofia Perovskaya, a Russian revolutionary who was executed for orchestrating the assassination of the Tsar Alexander II.

A major influence on the story was Ding Ling's personal experiences at that time, including depression, exhaustion, and impoverishment. Dr. Tani E. Barlow describes Ding Ling in 1927 as "miserable, drinking heavily, dispirited by the national tragedy of political counterrevolution, and exhausted by her impoverished, often squalid life in boarding-house rooms . . . . "

More generally, Ding Ling was passing from the milieu of a girls' schools to the male-dominated literary scene and involvement with some of China's most sophisticated male writers.

== Major themes ==
The major subject matter of "Miss Sophia's Diary" is a person's thoughts and feelings. The "interior" nature of the story is reinforced by its setting in a tuberculosis sanatorium.

Much of the diary concerns Miss Sophia's romantic attraction and sexual desire, and even reveals her bisexuality. More generally, the diary displays rapid swings of mood and outlook, and captures complex ambivalence of the subject about virtually everything in her life, what one scholar called "the chaos of personality."

"Miss Sophia's Diary" provides an unorthodox perspective on basic aspects of life. It expresses frank, unflattering views of the male gender: "glib, phony, cautious". . . "make my skin crawl". . . "bastard". It also shows an unflattering side of women: cruel, tough, selfish ("the lovely news that someone got sick over me"). . . "savage" It turns traditional morality on its head: the chasteness of her friends Yunlin and Yufang is "just one of those strange, unexplained things in life."

The story shows a person in all her complexity and contradictions. For instance, it shows how Miss Sophia is simultaneously able to exercise power over others, and yet is powerless. A recurring motif is that she has the power to command the attention of others, but not to make them understand her. She is attracted to a man named Ling Jishi for his physical beauty, but is stimulated by the jealousy of her friend Weidi. Moreover, Ling Jishi has "the beautiful form I adore" but a "cheap, ordinary soul."

Furthermore, Miss Sophia has varying degrees of awareness of her own complexity and contradictions. The author even speaks to her "readers" and admits that the diary is just one (crafted) version of her experience, and just another exercise in controlling the attention of others.

The emotional complexity of the character can be sensed from the fact that, in the closing sentences of the story, her mood ranges from "profound anguish . . . a mere trifle . . . agony . . . excitement . . . laugh wildly, I feel so sorry for myself . . . pathetic . . ."

Ding Ling uses this story to criticize Chinese society for not accommodating an independent woman like Sophia.

== Historical significance ==
"Miss Sophia's Diary" is a landmark in the evolving role of women in China during the era marked by the New Culture Movement and May Fourth Movement.

A subtext of "Miss Sophia's Diary", left unspoken until late in the story, is that there is an irreconcilable contradiction between the instinct to be attracted to someone like Ling Jishi and the fact that he is so irredeemably unenlightened.

Of equal historical significance is the interior nature of the narrative in "Miss Sophia's Diary". In contrast to other first person narratives, even those using the "diary" format, such as the landmark "Diary of a Madman" by Lu Xun, "Miss Sophia's Diary" is unusual in the frankness with which it reveals a real person's emotions.

== Comparative perspective ==
Madame Bovary by Gustave Flaubert was a major influence on Ding Ling in writing "Miss Sophia's Diary".

== English translations ==
- Tani E. Barlow, translator, "Miss Sophia's Diary," in I Myself Am A Woman: Selected Writings of Ding Ling, Tani E. Barlow, ed. (Boston: Beacon Press, 1989).
- Joseph S.M. Lau, translator, "Diary of Miss Sophia," Tamkang Review 5, No. 1 (1974).
- W.F. Jenner, translator, "Miss Sophie's Diary" (Beijing: Panda Books, 1985).
