= Jiang Guangci =

Chinese writer (1901–1931)

- 蒋光慈
- Born: Ru Heng; September 11, 1901; Dingxing County, Hebei, Qing Empire
- Died: August 31, 1931 (aged 29); Shanghai, Republic of China
- Citizenship: Qing Empire, Republic of China
- Occupation: Fiction writer
- Writing career
- Pen name: Guang Chi
- Language: Chinese

Jiang Guangci (simplified Chinese: 蒋光慈; traditional Chinese: 蔣光慈; pinyin: Jiǎng Guāngcí; September 11, 1901 – August 31, 1931), was a Chinese fiction writer active during the time of the Republic of China.

== Biography ==
Jiang Guangci's ancestors were originally from Henan, and his family was poor. His father Jiang Congfu opened a grocery store and taught himself poetry and was hired as a teacher by a local school. When Jiang Guangci was 11 years old he went to Zhicheng Primary School. He was greatly influenced by the Chinese teacher Zhan Gutang. Jiang Guangci participated in the book club organized by Zhan Gutang and read a lot of progressive books. In the summer of 1916, Jiang Guangci completed higher primary school and was admitted to Gushi Middle School in Henan Province. He was angry with the principal's hate for the poor and love for the rich, so he summoned the poorer classmates in the school to beat the principal. As a result, he was expelled from the school and returned to his hometown. In the summer of 1917, he entered the Fifth Middle School of Anhui Province to study.

The following year, with Li Zongye, Qian Xingcun and Li Kenong, he established Anshe in the Fifth Middle School, believed in anarchism, and published articles against warlords, great powers, and private ownership. After the outbreak of the May Fourth Movement, he changed his name to Guangchi and praised the October Revolution. He was one of the leaders of the student movement in Wuhu. In the spring of 1920, he entered the foreign language school run by the Shanghai Communist Group and joined the Socialist Youth League. The following year, he went to study at the Far East University in the Soviet Union. In 1922, he joined the Chinese Communist Party (CCP).

After returning to China in 1924, he first carried out party-building activities in Gushi, Henan, and then taught at Shanghai University. In 1925, he went to work in the Northern District Committee of the Chinese Communist Party in Beijing. After the First United Front between the Kuomintang (KMT) and the Communist Party broke down, according to Qu Qiubai's instructions, he organized the Sun Society with A Ying and others in early 1928, founded the Springfield Bookstore, and edited the Sun Monthly magazine.

In 1930, the League of Left-Wing Writers was established, and Jiang Guangci was elected as an alternate member of the Standing Committee, responsible for being editor-in-chief of the agency publication Pioneers. He actively advocated revolutionary literature and devoted himself to literary creation. He was expelled from the party in autumn of that year because of a dispute with the leaders of the League and submitted a letter of withdrawal from the party.

On August 31, 1931, he died in Shanghai Tongren Hospital.

== Works ==
Jiang's works about revolution often focused on a romantic view, as opposed to one addressing Marxist theories. According to Jiang, "All revolutionaries are romantics. Without being romantic, who would come top start a revolution?" Within the Communist literary tradition, Jiang was criticised for "lawlessness and hollowness" in his works.

Jiang's The Young Wanderer is an epistolatory novel in which protagonist Wang Zhong recounts the misfortunes he experiences. Wang's parents die at an early age, he witnesses patriotic student protestors get massacred, and is imprisoned. Wang determines that only violence can save China and he enrolls in Whampoa Academy. The novel concludes with his death in battle.

== See also ==
- Chinese literature
