= Wenyi Bao =

Wenyi Bao ("Literature and Art Newspaper", Chinese: 文艺报) is a Chinese-language newspaper about Chinese literature and art, that is published three times a week. It is issued by the China Writers Association and is published by the Xinhua Bookstore ("New China Bookstore") in Beijing. The name of the paper is sometimes written as Wenyi bao or Wenyibao.

== English translation ==
There does not appear to be a standard English translation for this publication, and various translations have been used: e.g. Literary Gazette, China Arts Gazette, China Literature and Art Gazette, etc.

== History ==
Wen yi bao was first issued on 25 September 1949 (the week before the founding of the People's Republic of China. It was suspended between June 1966 and June 1978 (during the Cultural Revolution). Howard Goldblatt (1979) described the impact as follows:

The history of Wenyi Bao, the most prestigious and influential magazine of its kind in Communist China, parallels the history of the People's Republic; founded in September 1949, Wenyi Bao has been at the heart of every literary movement since its inception, including the controversy surrounding its own editorial staff in the early 1950s. It has kept the Chinese reading public abreast not only of current literary trends, policies and squabbles, but of selected aspects of world literature as well. Virtually every truly important statement on literature sooner or later appeared in the pages of Wenyi Bao. Thus the magazine's forced cessation of publication in 1966 temporarily stilled one of the truly influential literary organs."

Since 2003 it has been issued three times a week. The former editors of the paper have included Mao Dun 茅盾, Ding Ling 丁玲, Feng Xuefeng 冯雪峰, Zhang Guangnian 张光年 and Feng Mu 冯牧.
