= Fiction Monthly =

Chinese literary magazine

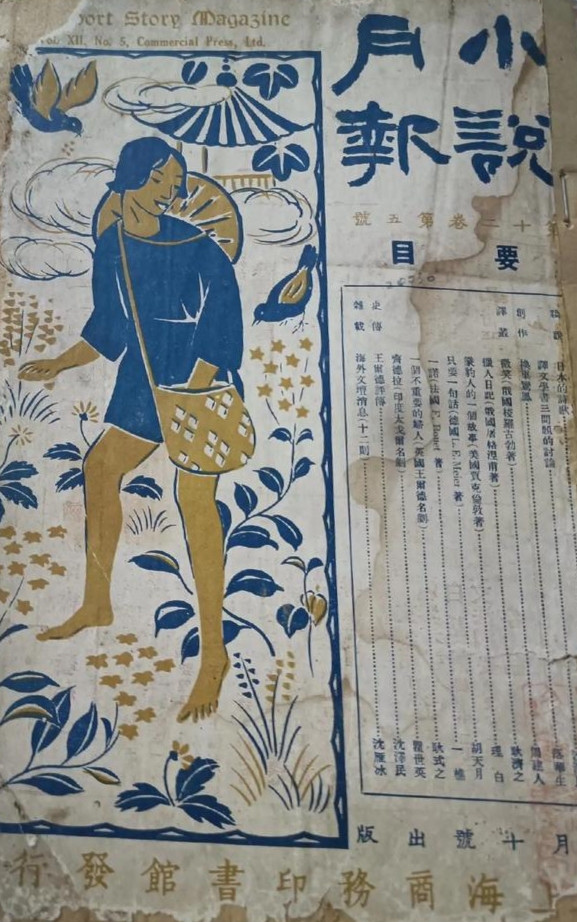
- Volume 12, No. 5 of the Fiction Monthly, 1923
- Editor-in-chief: Yun Tieqiao, Wang Chunnong, Mao Dun
- Frequency: Monthly
- Publisher: Commercial Press, Shanghai
- First issue: July 1910
- Final issue: 1932
- Country: China
- Language: Chinese

The Fiction Monthly (Chinese: 小說月報; pinyin: Xiaoshuo Yuebao; Original English title: The Short Story Magazine) was a Chinese literary journal published by the Commercial Press in Shanghai. First published in July 1910, its original editors were Yun Tieqiao (惲鐵樵) and Wang Chunnong (王蒓農). In January 1921, Mao Dun (Shen Yanbing) became its chief editor beginning with Volume 10, Issue 1. Fiction Monthly closed its doors in 1932 after the Japanese invasion of Shanghai with their naval and air bombardment (January 28 Incident). Altogether there were 22 volumes or 262 issues, including four specials.

== Publication history ==
The Fiction Monthly originally published poems and stories in the classical wenyan style, and plays in the new style. Western fiction and plays were also translated into wenyan. It was the domain of "Mandarin Duck and Butterfly School" (鴛鴦蝴蝶派) literature, published entertaining and recreational articles. The selections included popular love stories and situational novels. Many traditional serial novels were published in the journal. It was an important platform for the traditional scholars.

Zheng Zhenduo became the main editor since the volume 14, issue 1 in 1923. Due to the Shanghai Massacre on April 12, 1927, Zheng went to Europe and Ye Shengtao became the main editor instead of Zheng. Zheng came back to be the main editor again since volume 20, issue7 in June 1929.

=== Background ===
Zhou Zuoren strongly promoted humanist literature, struggled for human freedom, attacked all traditional literature including the Journey to the West because they were fulfilled with traditional moral rules such as Confucian morality. Soon after Shen Yanbing joined the Shanghai Communist Party group, the authorities of the Commercial press decided to adapt to the new trend of the May 4th movement and completely reform the Fiction Monthly. It was the second literary journal to be published by Commercial Press.

=== Format ===
It is visually similar to general journals, comprised 80 to 100 pages, shorter than Xin Xiaoshuo (新小說) and longer than Xiuxiang Xiaoshuo (繡像小說). It was printed much more closely than other journals, split to upper and lower halves in a regular format, fifteen lines of twenty-one characters on each of it. There are many more characters on one page which make the magazine very small thus it can be easily carried.

=== Notable contributors ===
Yun Tieqiao: He is second editor after Wang Chunnong.

Mao Dun: Mao Dun studied how to marry the new and old literatures together. When the new reformed version of Fiction Monthly was published, the issue is an adaptation of literary evolution.
