= Zhou Yang (politician) =

Chinese literary theorist, translator and Marxist thinker

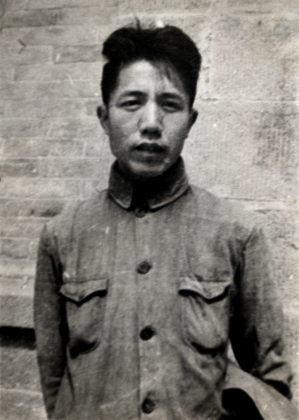
- Traditional Chinese: 周揚
- Simplified Chinese: 周扬
Transcriptions
Standard Mandarin
- Hanyu Pinyin: Zhōu Yáng
- Wade–Giles: Chou Yang

Zhou Yang or Chou Yang (November 7, 1908 – July 31, 1989), courtesy name Qiying (起应), was a Chinese literary theorist, translator and Marxist thinker, and Communist Party official, active from the founding of the League of the Left-Wing Writers in 1930. In the 1930s he was notable for his sharp disagreements with other leftist writers, including Lu Xun, concerning leftist literary theory. Zhou also translated the works of Leo Tolstoy and other Russian writers into Chinese.

Zhou Yang had a long career as a leading member of the Chinese Communist Party and a high-level government official in the People's Republic of China, being the Deputy Head of the Party's Propaganda Department as well as Deputy Minister of Culture in the years leading up to the Cultural Revolution, and then as a member of the Party's Central Committee following the end of that period. During the Cultural Revolution itself Zhou Yang was denounced and stripped of his posts: the campaign against him was kicked off by attacks on his 1930s era concept of "literature for national defense", which was judged to be revisionist.

== History ==
Zhou also translated the works of Leo Tolstoy (including Anna Karenina) and other Russian writers into Chinese. Shortly before the Yan'an Forum in 1942, he translated Nikolai Chernyshevsky's The Aesthetic Relations of Art to Reality into Chinese. Zhou described himself as being a "loyal follower" of Chernyshevsky, stating that Chernyshevsky's "famous formula of 'beauty is life' carries a fundamental truth." Zhou praised Soviet writers, such Alexander Fadeyev and his novel The Young Guard, for presenting "totally new characters of a kind unprecedented in human history, a kind of character possessed of the highest communist spirit and moral qualities. In their work in creating typical images of positive characters according to the conditions of actual life, beloved Soviet writers have completed their most glorious task of serving as 'engineers of the human soul.'"

Zhou's 1941 essay A Casual Discussion on Art and Life addressed the relationship between art and life through the idea of cultural practice. It examined the dialectical relationship between art and life in what Zhou referred to as "the practice of life" and "the practice of creation".

Zhou's view was that writers must learn from the masses, rather than position themselves as attempting to reform the masses from above.

After the People's Republic of China was declared in 1949, Zhou became one of Mao Zedong's most-supported literary theorists, and has been referred to as the Party's "literary czar". This was alongside his leading role in the Central Committee's influential Department of Propaganda and as Deputy Minister of Culture: in these roles he presided over the various campaigns against literary and artistic figures judged to be counterrevolutionary or bourgeois, for example the 1957 Anti-Rightist Campaign which came in response to the backlash against the criticism the Party faced during the Hundred Flowers Campaign. He had substantial power in the Ministry of Culture during the period when Mao Dun was the minister of culture.

In the context of the Hundred Flowers Campaign, the origin of the phrase "let a hundred flowers bloom" has been traced to Zhou using the phrase in 1951; he may have picked up the phrase from a discussion on Peking opera. On 21 May 1951, Zhou had stated in a speech at the Central Literary Research Institute:

In accordance with the instructions of Comrade Mao Zedong and the recent "Instructions on the Reform of the Traditional Opera" but the Central People's Government Administration, the main policy of the reform of the opera is to encourage free competition among various forms of opera to achieve "a hundred flowers blooming and to drive out the old and bring in the new."

In August 1956, Ding Ling was accused during the Sufan Movement of forming an anti-party clique. As part of her response to the allegations, she criticized Zhou for his extramarital affair. Ding's criticism of Zhou was widely circulated among Communist Party Officials. In response, Zhou alleged that Ding was unchaste and not loyal to the Communist Party. Although in 1957 Zhou apologized for going too far in his allegations, he remained a lifelong political opponent and critic of Ding.

Beginning in the middle of 1958, the new folk song movement sought to compile folk songs and poetry. Among the major compendiums of these folk works was Red Flag Ballads, compiled by Zhou and Guo Moruo, which presented the works of amateur poets anonymously as part of an effort to develop the figure of the mass writer in communist art and literature. The volume was one of the major artistic works of the Great Leap Forward.

In 1960, Zhou expressed ideological accommodation for professional artists, whose mediums had been criticized as capitalistic or feudalistic during the Great Leap Forward. According to Zhou, their technical skill was the "product of highly skilled and meticulous labor" and disregarding technique therefore was equivalent to "a contempt for human labour and wisdom."

Zhou's report, On the Military Tasks of Philosophy and Social Science Workers, delivered to Mao in 1963, was one of the catalysts for the Cultural Revolution.

During the late stage of the Cultural Revolution Zhou was himself imprisoned after falling out of favor due to differing view points on the importance of art in politics.

After the Cultural Revolution ended, he was rehabilitated and given new political offices, being elected to the Chinese Communist Party's Central Committee at the party's Eleventh National Congress. At that time he apologized to victims of past campaigns. He also advocated the humanist aspects of Marxism within the Communist Party near the end of his life, and was criticized again for such views.
