= Feng Keng =

Chinese poet and author (1907–1931)

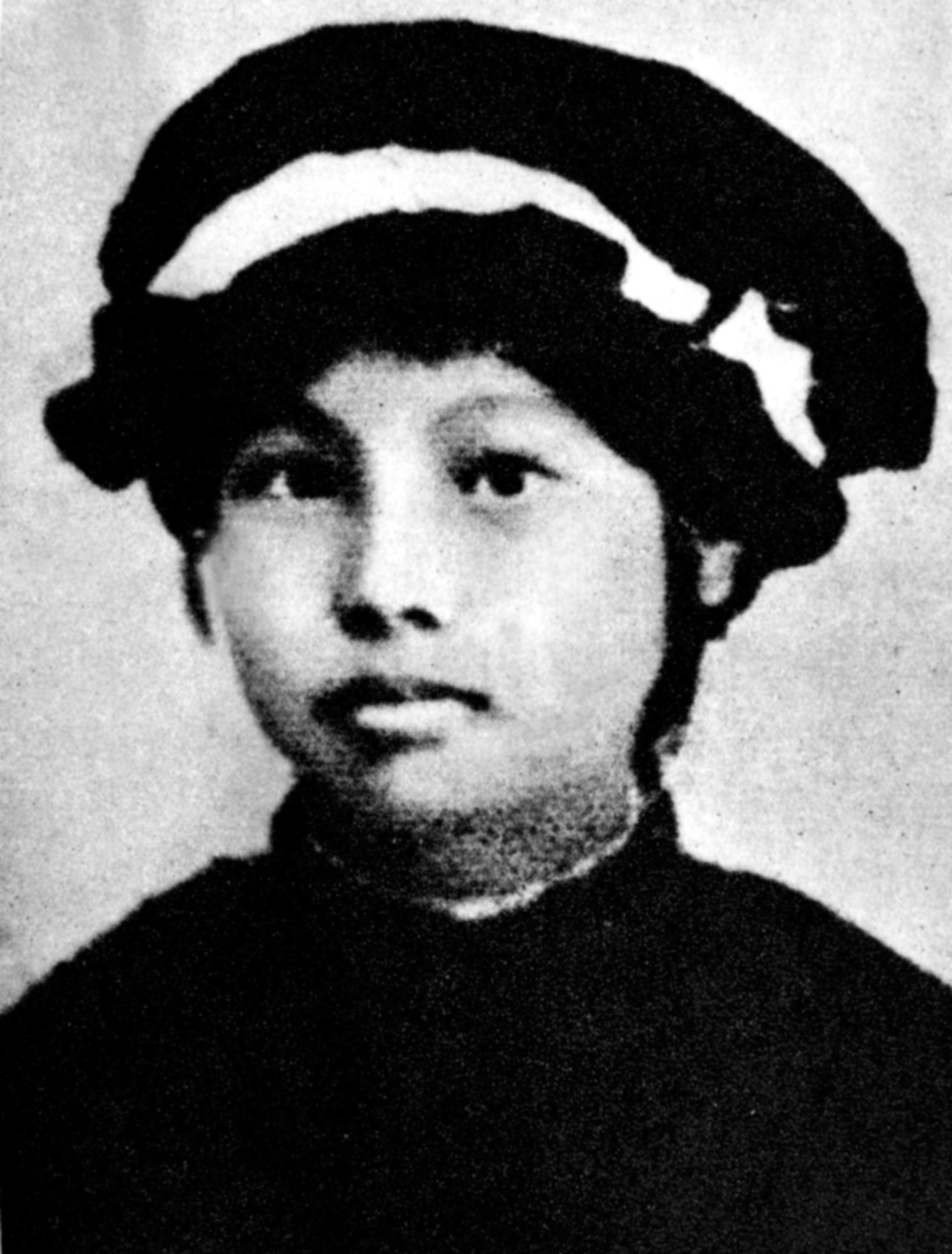

Feng Keng (Chinese: 馮鏗; 7 October 1907 – 10 February 1931) was a poet and author who, following her execution became known as one of the Five Martyrs of the League of Left-Wing Writers. Feng was born in Guangdong province, China. Her mother was a teacher.

When the magazine China Forum reported on the executions, it also published poems and stories written by four of those killed, and Feng's work was featured.

== Bibliography ==
- Anderson, Jennifer; Munford, Theresa (1985). Chinese women writers: a collection of short stories by Chinese women writers of the 1920s and 30s. China Books & Periodicals. ISBN 978-0835115421.
- Davies, Gloria (2013). Lu Xun's Revolution. Harvard University Press. ISBN 978-0674072640.
- "Feng Keng (1907–1931)". Dictionary of Women Worldwide: 25,000 Women Through the Ages. 2007. Archived from the original on 24 February 2016 – via HighBeam Research.
- Yan, Haiping (2006). Chinese Women Writers and the Feminist Imagination, 1905-1948. Routledge. ISBN 978-0415232883.
- Tong, Qingsheng (2009). "Guo Songtao in London: An Unaccomplished Mission of Discovery". In Elaine Yee Lin Ho, Julia Kuehn (ed.). China Abroad: Travels, Subjects, Spaces. Hong Kong University Press. ISBN 978-9622099456.
- Zhang, Yingjin (1996). The City in Modern Chinese Literature and Film: Configurations of Space, Time and Gender. Stanford University Press. ISBN 978-0804726825.
