= Feng Xuefeng =

Chinese writer and activist

- 冯雪峰
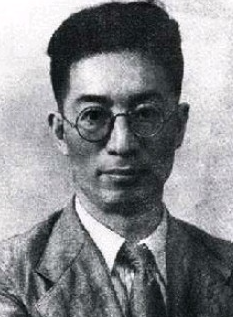
- Born: 2 June 1903; Iwu, Chekiang, Great Qing (present-day Yiwu, Zhejiang, China)
- Died: 31 January 1976 (aged 72); China
- Occupations: Writer and activist
- Political party: Chinese Communist Party

Chinese name
- Traditional Chinese: 馮雪峰
- Simplified Chinese: 冯雪峰
Transcriptions
Standard Mandarin
- Hanyu Pinyin: Féng Xuěfēng
- Wade–Giles: Feng Hsue-feng
- IPA: [fə̌ŋ ɕɥè.fə́ŋ]

Feng Xuefeng (English: /ˈfʌŋ ʃwɛˈfʌŋ/ FUNG shweh-FUNG; Chinese: 冯雪峰; 2 June 1903 – 31 January 1976) was a Chinese writer and activist known for his contributions to socialist literary criticism, particularly as an authority on Lu Xun. Initially a prominent member of the Chinese Communist Party, he was accused of being a counter-revolutionary and he spent the last few decades of his life living under persecution. Feng died of lung cancer during the final year of the Cultural Revolution.

== Early life ==
Feng was born in Yiwu, Zhejiang. He attended the Hangzhou Number One Teachers' College and was a member of its "Morning Light Society" (a literary society established by poet Zhu Ziqing). In 1925, Feng began studying Japanese at Peking University. He joined the Chinese Communist Party in 1927 and was both a founding member and the party secretary of the Left-wing Association of Chinese Writers.

== Career ==
Beginning in the 1930s, Feng presented himself as an outspoken socialist literary critic. He was especially interested in the works of Lu Xun, which some of his colleagues regarded as archaic. In late 1937, Feng began writing a novel inspired by the Long March, titled Lu Dai zhi si (卢代之死), or Death of Lu Dai. The original 500,000-character manuscript was lost after he was captured and imprisoned by the Nationalist government in 1941. In contrast to the optimistic poetry that he had written in his youth, his later works, written in prison, expressed "the strong convictions of a Communist revolutionary".

Following the founding of the People's Republic of China, Feng was appointed as editor of both People's Literature and Literary and Art Gazette in 1951 and 1952 respectively. Believing that he was free to do so, he penned editorials critical of the government and was consequently labelled as a counter-revolutionary. As part of the Anti-Rightist Campaign which started in 1957, Feng was sentenced to re-education through labor, although he was acquitted in 1961. Having previously attempted to rewrite Death of Lu Dai in the early 1950s, he sought to write what would have been the only novel of his career for a third time. After being advised not to write on a "revolutionary subject" like the Long March, however, Feng reportedly burnt the entire manuscript.

== Final years ==
Feng continued living under persecution in his final years and was again targeted by the government during the Cultural Revolution. He died of lung cancer in 1976—the final year of the Cultural Revolution.
