= Zhang Wuling =

Chinese educator (1889–1938)

- 張武齡
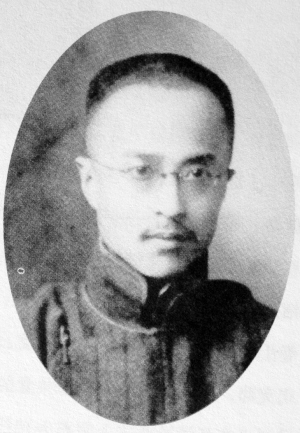
- Zhang Wuling
- Born: 1889; Hefei, Anhui, Qing Empire
- Died: 1938 (aged 48–49); Hefei, Anhui, Republic of China
- Occupation: Educator
- Spouse: Lu Ying
- Children: 10
- Parent: Zhang Huakui (father)

Chinese name
- Traditional Chinese: 張武齡
- Simplified Chinese: 张武龄
Transcriptions
Standard Mandarin
- Hanyu Pinyin: Zhāng Wǔlíng

Shengjin
- Traditional Chinese: 繩進
- Simplified Chinese: 绳进
Transcriptions
Standard Mandarin
- Hanyu Pinyin: Shéngjìn

Jiyou
- Chinese: 冀牖
Transcriptions
Standard Mandarin
- Hanyu Pinyin: Jìyǒu

Jiyou
- Chinese: 吉友
Transcriptions
Standard Mandarin
- Hanyu Pinyin: Jíyǒu

Zhang Wuling (Chinese: 張武齡; pinyin: Zhāng Wǔlíng; 1889–1938) was a Chinese educator. Zhang was noted for promoting Chinese women's education and Chinese educational equality, he founded Suzhou Leyi Girls' School and Pinglin Middle School in Suzhou, Jiangsu. He was the father of poet Zhang Chonghe and scholar Zhang Yunhe.

== Names ==
His birth name was Zhang Wuling (Chinese: 張武齡). His style name was Shengjin (Chinese: 繩進), he also known as Jiyou (Chinese: 冀牖) and Jiyou (Chinese: 吉友).

== Biography ==
Zhang was born in Hefei, Anhui, in 1889, the grandson of Zhang Shusheng, a high-ranking military officer in the Huai Army.

Zhang moved to Shanghai in 1912. In 1918, he moved to Suzhou, he established Suzhou Leyi Girls' School (Chinese: 蘇州樂益女子學校) in 1921 and Pinglin Middle School (Chinese: 平林中學) in 1925.

In 1937, the Second Sino-Japanese War broke out, he escaped from the flames of war with his family and moved to his hometown. Zhang died in there in 1938, aged 49.

== Personal life ==
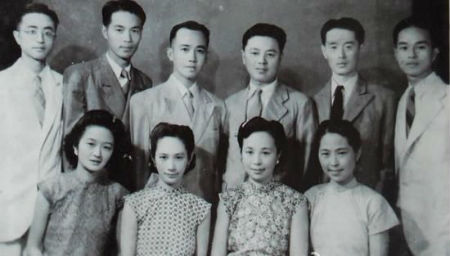
Zhang Wuling's children. Sons: Zhang Ninghe, Zhang Yuhe, Zhang Yinhe, Zhang Zonghe, Zhang Dinghe, Zhang Huanhe. Daughters: Chang Yuen-ho, Chang Yun-ho, Chang Chao-ho, Chang Ch'ung-ho.

In 1906, Zhang married Lu Ying (Chinese: 陸英) in Hefei, Anhui. They had six sons and four daughters.

Sons:

- Zhang Ninghe (Chinese: 張寧和)
- Zhang Yuhe (Chinese: 張宇和)
- Zhang Yinhe (Chinese: 張寅和)
- Zhang Zonghe (Chinese: 張宗和)
- Zhang Dinghe (Chinese: 張定和)
- Zhang Huanhe (Chinese: 張寰和)

Daughters:

- Chang Yuen-ho (Chinese: 張元和; husband: Gu Chuanjie)
- Zhang Yunhe (Chinese: 張允和; husband: Zhou Youguang)
- Chang Chao-ho (Chinese: 張兆和; husband: Shen Congwen)
- Chang Ch'ung-ho (Chinese: 張充和; husband: Hans Fränkel)
