= 5th Golden Rooster Awards =

1985 Chinese film awards ceremony

The 5th Golden Rooster Award honoring the best in film of 1985, was given in Chengdu, Sichuan Province, May 23, 1985.

== Winners & Nominees ==
Best Film	Best Director
The Girl in Red; Wreaths at the Foot of the Mountain; Girl from Mt. Huangshan; Tan Sitong	Ling Zifeng－The Border Town; Xie Jin－Wreaths at the Foot of the Mountain; Zhang Yuan/Yu Yanfu－Girl from Mt. Huangshan; Lu Xiaoya－The Girl in Red
Best Children Film	Best Writing
我和我的同学们	Li Zhun/Li Cunbao－Wreaths at the Foot of the Mountain; Peng Mingyan/Bi Jianchang－Girl from Mt. Huangshan
Best Actor	Best Actress
Lu Xiaohe－Wreaths at the Foot of the Mountain; Feng Hanyuan－Border Town	Li Ling－Girl from Mt. Huangshan; Gu Yongfei－Thunder
Best Supporting Actor	Best Supporting Actress
He Wei－Wreaths at the Foot of the Mountain; Li Moran－Garden Street Number 5	Wang Yumei－Tan Sitong; Ding Yi－Girl from Mt. Huangshan; Gai Ke－Wreaths at the Foot of the Mountain
Best Chinese Opera Film	Best Documentary
五女拜寿	零的突破; 老北京的叙说
Best Animation	Best Popular Science Film
火童	广开节能之路; 细胞重建
Best Cinematography	Best Art Direction
Yellow Earth－Zhang Yimou; Yamaha Fish Stall－Han Xingyuan/Wang Hengli; Thunderstorm－Luo Congzhou; Border Town－Liang Ziyong	Yamaha Fish Stall－Zhang Zhichu; Border Town－Xia Rujin; Thunderstorm－Han Shangyi/Qu Ranxin; Tan Sitong－Jin Xiwu
Best Music	Best Sound Recording
Ren Sheng－Xu Youfu; The Girl in Red－Wang Ming; Thunderstorm－Lu Qiming; Border Town－Liu Zhuang	Thunderstorm－Miao Zhenyu/Feng Deyao; Girl from Mt. Huangshan－Chen Wenyuan/Fu Linge
Best Editing	Best Property
Wreaths at the Foot of the Mountain－Zhou Dingwen; The Girl in Red－Yuan Yongfang; Yamaha Fish Stall－Li Yingshuang; Girl from Mt. Huangshan－Li Zhonglin	N/A; Thunderstorm－Qian Zhangxiong/Lin Youxing; Tan Sitong－Chen Xiancheng/Yang Zhoumin
Best Costume	Best Make Up
N/A	N/A
Best Stunt	
N/A	

== Special Award ==
- Special Jury Award
  - Documentary: 100 Days of Hong Kong
  - Comedy: 阿混新传
