= Zhang Yunhe =

Chinese writer and scholar of kunqu opera (1909–2002)

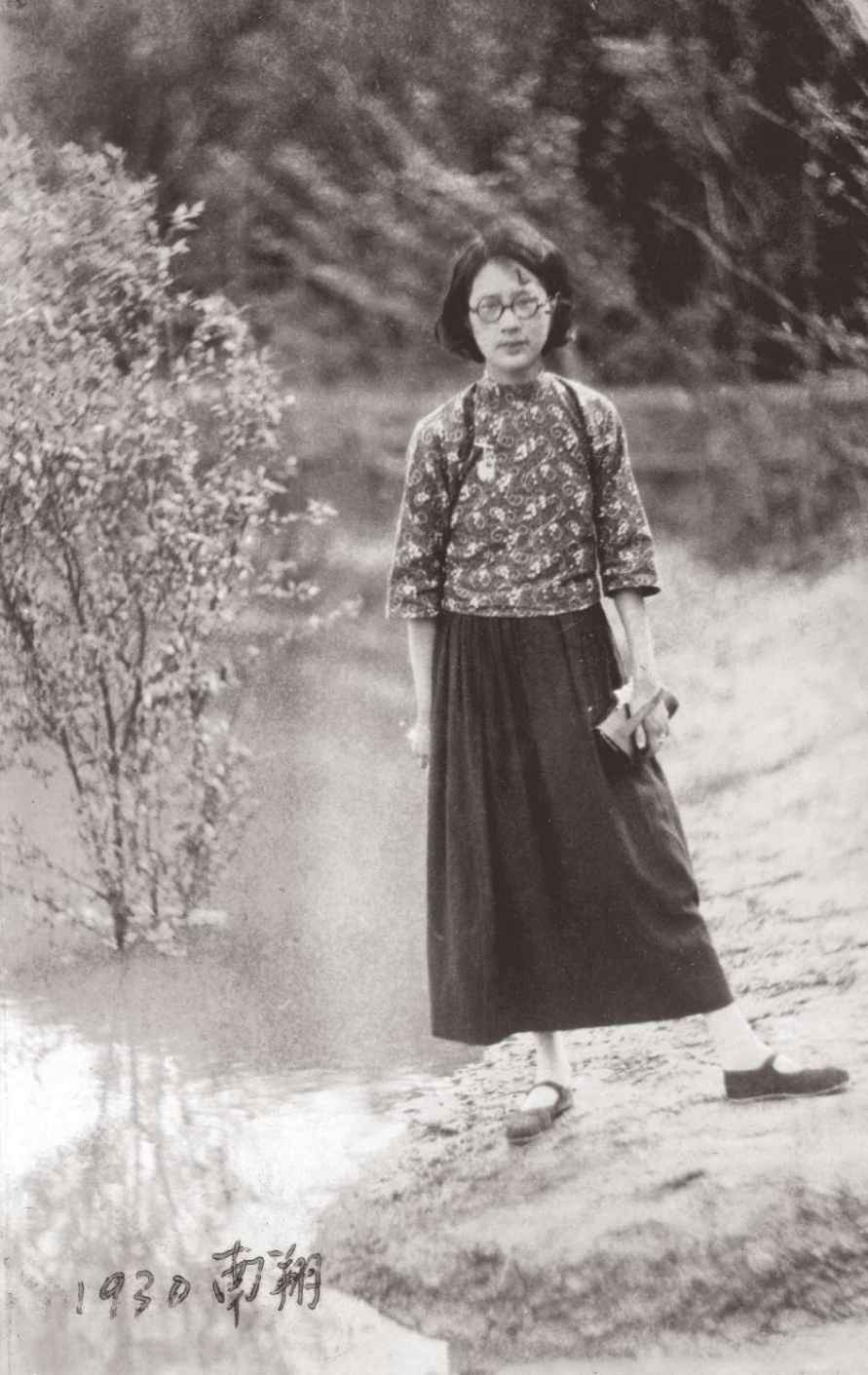
- Born: July 25, 1909; Hefei, Anhui Province
- Died: August 14, 2002 (aged 93)

Zhang Yunhe (张允和, July 25, 1909 – August 14, 2002) was a Chinese writer and scholar of kunqu opera. She was the wife of linguist Zhou Youguang.

== Life ==
=== Early life and marriage ===
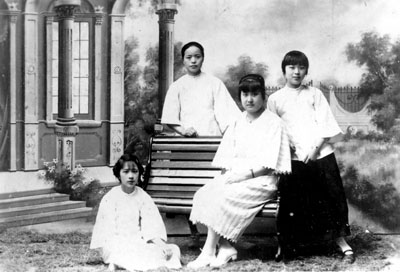
Yunhe (far left, on the ground) with her three sisters in 1924

Zhang Yunhe was born on July 25, 1909, in Hefei, Anhui Province, to educator Zhang Wuling and his wife Lu Ying. Her family was native to Suzhou, and her father was the founder of Suzhou Leyi Girls' School and Pinglin Middle School in Suzhou. Her parents had married in 1906, and she had six brothers and three sisters. Her elder sister Zhang Yuanhe was a kunqu scholar, her younger sister Zhang Zhaohe was a writer and the wife of novelist Shen Congwen, and her youngest sister Zhang Chonghe was a poet and kunqu singer. Yunhe suffered from heart disease at a young age.

In 1933, she married linguist Zhou Youguang. The next year, she gave birth to a son, Zhou Xiaoping. The two later had a daughter, Zhou Xiaohe, who died of appendicitis at the age of six.

During the Cultural Revolution, she was sent to study Mao Zedong's writings at a cadre school. While at the cadre school, she studied the various language versions of Quotations from Chairman Mao Tse-tung.

=== Later life ===
In 1996, Zhang initiated the revival of the family publication "Water" (水) and took on the role of editor-in-chief. After 1998, she published three books, "Passionate people are immortal" (多情人不老), "The last scholarly lady" (最後的閨秀) and "Old stories of Zhang family"(張家舊事), and prepared the publication of "Kunqu Diary" (崑曲日記).

On August 14, 2002, Zhang Yunhe died of heart disease at the age of 93.
