= Bordertown =

Bordertown may refer to:

== Film and television ==
- Bordertown (1935 film), a film starring Paul Muni and Bette Davis
- Bordertown (2007 film), a film starring Jennifer Lopez and Antonio Banderas
- The Border Town, a 1984 Chinese film
- Bordertown (1989 TV series), a 1989–1991 Canadian-French western drama television series
- Bordertown (Australian TV series), a 1995 Australian television series
- Bordertown (American TV series), a 2016 American animated television series
- Bordertown (Finnish TV series), a 2016 Finnish crime drama television series

== Other uses ==
- Bordertown, South Australia, a town in Australia
  - Bordertown railway station
- Tthebacha Náre 196A, also called Border Town, an Indian reserve in Canada
- Bordertown, the setting of the Borderland book series

== See also ==
- Border town, a town or city close to the boundary between two countries, states, or regions
