= Qian Weichang =

Chinese physicist and applied mathematician (1912–2010)

- 钱伟长
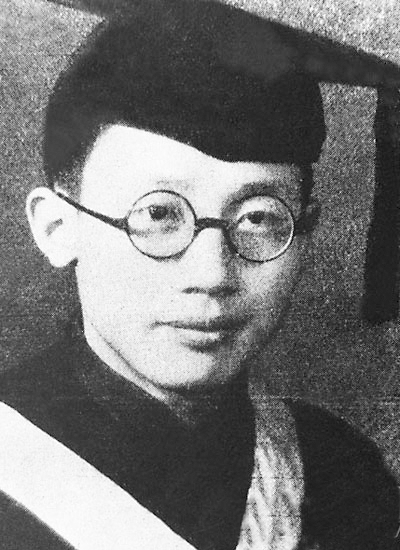
- Qian in 1937
- Born: 9 October 1912; Wuxi, Jiangsu, China
- Died: 30 July 2010 (aged 97); Shanghai, China
- Other names: Wei-zang Chien; Wei-chang Chien; Jimmy Chien
- Education: Tsinghua University (BS); University of Toronto (PhD)
- Occupation: Physicist
- Known for: Chinese physicist

Qian Weichang or Chien Wei-zang (simplified Chinese: 钱伟长; traditional Chinese: 錢偉長; pinyin: Qián Wěicháng; Wade–Giles: Ch'ien Wei-ch'ang; 9 October 1912 – 30 July 2010) was a Chinese physicist and applied mathematician, as well as academician of the Chinese Academy of Sciences. He served as President of Shanghai University.

== Career ==
Qian was born in Wuxi, Jiangsu, Republic of China, on 9 October 1912. His uncle was the historian Ch'ien Mu. After graduating from Tsinghua University with a Bachelor of Science in 1935, he entered its Graduate School and became an intern researcher at the National Central Research Institute under the guidance of Wu Youxun. He obtained a Doctor of Philosophy at the University of Toronto under the supervision of John Lighton Synge in 1942, and then worked as a research associate in the Jet Propulsion Laboratory of Caltech.

In 1946, Qian returned to China and served as mechanics professor of Tsinghua University, Peking University and Yanjing University. In 1950s, he was dean of studies and vice president of Tsinghua University, vice director of the Institute of Mechanics of Chinese Academy of Sciences (CAS), director of the Institute of Automation of CAS, and a member of the standing committee of All China Federation of Scientific Societies. He was elected a founding academician of the CAS in 1955 and a foreign academician of the Polish Academy of Sciences in 1956. He was appointed vice-president of the Tsinghua University at the same year, but was seen as a "rightist" during the anti-rightist campaign because he criticised the removal of science majors in the 1950s. He was labelled an ultra-rightist in 1958, but this was redressed in 1983. During the Cultural Revolution (1966–1976), Qian worked at a Beijing steel company, invented the best hydraulic press in Beijing and was called "professor" by his workmates.

In 1982, Qian became president of Shanghai University of Technology, which had been turned into shambles after the consolidation of four institutions of higher education in 1994.

Qian was editor-in-chief of Applied Mathematics and Mechanics (English Edition), a member of the editorial boards of International Journal of Engineering Science (US), Advances in Applied Mechanics (US), Journal of Thin-walled Structure (Holland) and Journal of Finite Elements in Analysis and Design. He had been vice chairman of the National Committee of Chinese People's Political Consultative Conference since 1987.

Qian was a specialist in applied mathematics, mechanics, physics, engineering science and Chinese information processing. He was generally acknowledged as one of the pioneers and founders of modern mechanics undertakings in China. His major research activities include; the intrinsic theory of plates and shells, the analysis of large deflection of thin plates and shells, the analysis of corrugated pipes, mechanics of armour penetration, singular perturbation methods, variational principles and generalized variational principles, finite element methods as well as the measurements of atmospheric electricity, spectral analysis of rare-earth elements, wave guide theory, lubrication theory, the development of high-energy batteries, his macro-coding of Chinese characters, etc. The joint work with J. L. Synge on the intrinsic theory of plates and shells is considered as a pioneering classical work in solid mechanics and his successive approximation method of treating large deflection problem is now named as "Chien's method". And he initiated a novel singular perturbation method, the method of composite expansions.

He had published in academic monographs and hundreds of scientific papers. Due to his work on the problems of large deflation of circular elastic plates and the generalized variational principles, he won the State Natural Science Award (Second Class) twice, in 1965 and 1982. He also made great contribution to the engineering applications of sciences, such as the fluttering of airplanes, the design of submarines, armour penetration, the design of instruments and panpipe systems.

In the early 1980s, Qian worked with Zhou Youguang and Liu Zunqi on creating a Chinese-language edition of Encyclopædia Britannica.

During his presidency of Shanghai University (formerly Shanghai University of Technology), he devoted himself to the reconstruction of the university and to the accomplishment of reforms in higher education. He believed that the key role of higher education is to bring up excellent new generations with prefect personality and advanced expertise. For this purpose, he laid emphasis on raising the academic level of the university and showed great concerns to the publication of academic journals at the university.

Qian also served as chairman of the Steering Committee of the Third International Conference on Linear Mechanics in Shanghai in 1998.

He died in Shanghai at 6:20AM on 30 July 2010.

== Awards and honors ==
- In 1965 and 1982, he won the State Natural Science Award (Second Class) twice.
- Asteroid 283279 Qianweichang, discovered by the PMO NEO Survey Program at Purple Mountain in 2007, was named in his memory. The official naming citation was published by the Minor Planet Center on 5 February 2020 (M.P.C. 121135).

== Bibliography ==
- "Professor Dr. Chien Wei-zang (Qian Weichang)." Archived 23 July 2011 at the Wayback Machine Journal of Shanghai University. 2.2 (June 1998). Reprinted in Facta Universitatis. Series: Mechanics, Automatic Control and Robotics. 2.8 (1998): 789–790.
