= Charlotte Fränkel =

German classical archaeologist

Charlotte Fränkel (25 August 1880 – 7 December 1933) was a German classical archaeologist and teacher.

== Biography ==
She was taught by Helene Lange and graduated from the Luisengymnasium Berlin on 29 October 1900. She studied classical archaeology at the University of Berlin and the University of Bonn, passing the Rigorosum in Bonn on 30 November 1911. Her 1912 doctoral thesis was titled Satyr- und Bakchennamen auf Vasenbildern. Fränkel was one of only five women who received a doctorate in classical archaeology before the First World War (The others were: Margarete Bieber, Elvira Fölzer, Margret Heinemann, Viktoria von Lieres und Wilkau).

In August 1914, she became a high school teacher and worked at the Augusta School in Berlin. From 1922 she worked at a municipal college in Berlin. On 1 September 1933, she was forced to retire early due to implementation of the Law for the Restoration of the Professional Civil Service under the Nazi regime in Germany.

=== Personal life ===
Charlotte Fränkel was the daughter of the classical philologist Max Fränkel and sister of Hermann Fränkel. In 1915, she married fellow archaeologist Georg Loeschcke.

== Publications ==
- Fränkel, C. 1912. "Korinthische Posse", in Rheinisches Museum no 67, 94–106.
- Fränkel, C. 1912.. Satyr - und Bakchennamen auf Vasenbildern. Niemeyer, Halle.
