= List of centenarians (educators, school administrators, social scientists and linguists) =

The following is a list of centenarians – specifically, people who became famous as educators, school administrators, social scientists and linguists – known for reasons other than their longevity. For more lists, see lists of centenarians.

All supercentenarians (above 110 years old)
Living

Name	Lifespan	Age	Reason for Notability
Daniel Aaron	1912–2016	103	American academic and author
Vasily Abaev	1900–2001	100	Ossetian linguist and philologist
Sophie Aberle	1896–1996	100	American physician, anthropologist, and nutritionist
Thelma Davidson Adair	1920–2024	103	American educator, writer, activist, and Presbyterian church leader
Helen Adolf	1895–1998	102	Austrian-American linguist and literature scholar
Leoncio Afonso	1916–2017	100	Spanish academic, professor, and geographer
Lydia Kaʻonohiponiponiokalani Aholo	1878–1979	101	Hawai'ian educator
Idriz Ajeti	1917–2019	101	Albanologist, academic and researcher
Lewis Akeley	1861–1961	100	American academic and engineer; mentor to future Nobel laureate Ernest Lawrence
Henry Angus	1891–1991	100	Canadian educator, lawyer, and administrator
John Haden Badley	1865–1967	102	British educator and founder of the Bedales School
Thomas Swain Barclay	1892–1993	101	American academic and Stanford University professor
Henri Baruk	1897–1999	101	French neuropsychiatrist
Jacques Barzun	1907–2012	104	American historian
Anne Olivier Bell	1916–2018	102	British literary editor and art scholar, member of the Monuments Men Brigade
Ze'ev Ben-Haim	1907–2013	105	Israeli linguist and former president of the Academy of the Hebrew Language
Helena Benitez	1914–2016	102	Filipina academic and administrator of the Philippine Women's University
Martin S. Bergmann	1913–2014	100	American clinical professor of psychology
Ruthven Blackburn	1913–2016	102	Australian physician and professor of medicine
Giuliano Bonfante	1904–2005	101	Italian linguistics expert
Louise Marion Bosworth	1881–1982	101	American social scientist
Harvie Branscomb	1894–1998	103	American chancellor of Vanderbilt University
Alice Braunlich	1888–1989	101	American classical philologist
Hella Brock	1919–2020	101	German educator and musicologist
Hallie Quinn Brown	1849–1949	100	African American educator and writer
Jerome Bruner	1915–2016	100	American psychologist
June Buchanan	1887–1988	100	American co-founder of Alice Lloyd College
Ambrose Burke	1895–1998	102	American President of Saint Ambrose University
Elizabeth Campbell	1902–2004	101	American public broadcasting pioneer and educator
Chen Han-seng	1897–2004	107	Chinese sociologist and economist
Gabriel Chiramel	1914–2017	102	Indian Roman Catholic priest and educationist
Mary T. Clark	1913–2014	100	American academic
Thomas D. Clark	1903–2005	101	American historian
Ronald Coase	1910–2013	102	British economist (Nobel laureate)
Stanwood Cobb	1881–1982	101	American Baháʼí educator and author
Anna J. Cooper	1858–1964	105	African-American educator and civil rights advocate
Leticia Cossettini	1904–2004	100	Argentine teacher and pedagogue
Isabel Crook	1915–2023	107	Canadian-British anthropologist
Richard N. Current	1912–2012	100	American historian
Nellie Dale	1865–1967	102	British educator
Julia Davis	1891–1993	101	African-American educator
Frank A. DeMarco	1921–2023	102	Italian-born Canadian educator and administrator
Peter Demetz	1922–2024	101	Prague-born American scholar
P. C. Devassia	1906–2006	100	Indian Sanskrit scholar and poet
Aaron Director	1901–2004	102	Ukrainian-American professor
Neagu Djuvara	1916–2018	101	Romanian diplomat and historian
Rachel Dror	1921–2024	103	German-Israeli teacher
Isabella Dryden	1917–2024	106	Canadian educator
George Alexander Duncan	1902–2006	103	Irish economist and academic
Alicia Dussán de Reichel	1920–2023	102	Colombian educator
Marianne Eckardt	1913–2018	105	German-born American psychoanalyst and editor
Hein Eersel	1922–2022	100	Surinamese academic administrator, chancellor of the University of Suriname (1968–1988)
Murray Barnson Emeneau	1904–2005	101	American linguist
Leopold Engleitner	1905–2013	107	Austrian lecturer and Holocaust survivor
Fan Xuji	1914–2015	101	Chinese educator and President of Shanghai Jiao Tong University
D. J. Finney	1917–2018	101	British statistician
Eilene Galloway	1906–2009	102	American space policy expert
Albert Ganado	1924–2025	101	Maltese historian, cartographer, and lawyer
Marie de Garis	1910–2010	100	Guernseyian lexicographer
Edmund Gordon	1921–	105	American psychologist
Jules Gros	1890–1992	102	Breton linguist
Luther H. Gulick	1892–1993	100	American social scientist
Daphne Lorraine Gum	1916–2017	101	Australian pioneer in cerebral palsy care
Bertrand Hallward	1901–2003	102	British first vice-chancellor of the University of Nottingham
Judith Hemmendinger	1923–2024	100	German-born Israeli researcher and author
Laurin L. Henry	1921–2025	103	American academic and researcher
Fletcher Hodges Jr.	1905–2006	100	American expert on the music of Stephen Foster
Robert R. Holt	1917–2024	106	American psychologist, scholar of psychoanalytic theory
Olivia Hooker	1915–2018	103	American psychologist; first African-American woman in the United States Coast Guard
Emily Howland	1827–1929	101	American philanthropist and educator
Halil İnalcık	1916–2016	100	Turkish historian
Robert L. Kahn	1918–2019	100	American psychologist and social scientist
Janet Kalven	1913–2014	100	American educator and writer
Hasan Karmi	1905–2007	101	Palestinian linguist, broadcaster and scholar
Alison Kelly	1913–2016	102	English art historian
Anvar Khamei	1917–2018	101	Iranian sociologist and economist
Ferdinand Knobloch	1916–2018	101	Czech-Canadian psychiatrist
Dorothy Knowles	1906–2010	104	British academic
Jaroslav Kozlík	1907–2012	105	Czech reformer of physical education
Emmanuel Kriaras	1906–2014	107	Greek lexicographer and philologist
Hans Kurath	1891–1992	100	Austrian-American linguist
Ernest Kurnow	1912–2014	101	American business professor
B. B. Lal	1921–2022	101	Indian archaeologist, director general of the ASI (1968–1972)
Karolina Lanckorońska	1898–2002	104	Polish countess, art historian, and writer; founding member of the Polish Scientific Society Abroad as well as member of the Polish Academy of Arts and Sciences
Geoffrey Langlands	1917–2019	101	British Army Major and Pakistan-based educator
Margaret Morgan Lawrence	1914–2019	105	American psychiatrist and psychoanalyst
Harold Lawton	1899–2005	106	British scholar of French literature
Anthony Lazzaro	1921–2021	100	American academic administrator
Wolf Leslau	1906–2006	100	American leading scholar on Ethiopian languages and culture
William Leuchtenburg	1922–2025	102	American historian
Claude Lévi-Strauss	1908–2009	100	Belgian-born French anthropologist
Bernard Lewis	1916–2018	101	British historian of the Middle East
Guenter Lewy	1923–2026	102	German-born American historian
María Teresa Linares Savio	1920–2021	100	Cuban musicologist
Charles E. Lindblom	1917–2018	100	American academic
Liu Xuyi	1913–2018	105	Chinese historian and scholar
Adolph Lowe	1893–1995	102	German sociologist and economist
Seymour Lubetzky	1898–2003	104	Belarusian-American librarian
John Harding Lucas	1920–2025	104	African-American educator and academic administrator, and president of Shaw University (1986–1987)
Amadou-Mahtar M'Bow	1921–2024	103	Senegalese educator
Eleanor Maccoby	1917–2018	101	American psychologist
Ernest Manheim	1900–2002	102	American sociologist, anthropologist and composer
Leo Marx	1919–2022	102	American historian
Richard B. Mather	1913–2014	101	Chinese-born American sinologist
Henry Evans Maude	1906–2006	100	British anthropologist
E. Gerald Meyer	1919–	107	American Emeritus professor of chemistry
Brenda Milner	1918–	108	British-Canadian pioneer of neuropsychology
Hiroshi Mizuta	1919–2023	103	Japanese economist and historian, member of the Japan Academy
David O. Moberg	1922–2023	101	American sociologist
Eduardo Morales Miranda	1910–2012	102	Chilean founder of the Southern University of Chile
John Morton-Finney	1889–1998	108	American civil rights activist, educator, and lawyer
Benzion Netanyahu	1910–2012	102	Polish-born Israeli historian
Dorothy Nyswander	1894–1998	104	American health educator and advocate
Rodolfo Oroz	1895–1997	101	Chilean writer, professor and philologist
Maria Isaura Pereira de Queiróz	1918–2018	100	Brazilian sociologist
Sybil Plumlee	1911–2012	100	American teacher and police officer
Zdeňka Pokorná	1905–2007	101	Czech teacher
Frank Popper	1918–2020	102	Czech-born French-British historian of art and technology, professor and author
Norman Porteous	1898–2003	104	British academic; Dean at the University of Edinburgh
Eva Gabriele Reichmann	1897–1998	101	German historian and sociologist
Loren Reid	1905–2014	109	American educator and author
Barbara Reynolds	1914–2015	100	British scholar of Italian studies
Fazlollah Reza	1915–2019	104	Iranian engineer and university professor
Laban Lacy Rice	1870–1973	102	American educator and President of Cumberland University
Prezell Robinson	1920–2026	105	African-American sociologist and academic administrator, president of Saint Augustine's University (1967–1995)
Guy Rocher	1924–2025	101	Canadian sociologist
Charles P. Roland	1918–2022	104	American historian
Justus Rosenberg	1921–2021	100	Polish academic
Louise Rosenblatt	1904–2005	100	American literary critic and scholar
María Rostworowski	1915–2016	100	Peruvian historian
Ole Mørk Sandvik	1875–1976	101	Norwegian musicologist
Raymond J. Saulnier	1908–2009	100	American Chairman of the Council of Economic Advisers
Laura Scales	1879–1990	110	American Dean at Smith College
Carl Emil Schorske	1915–2015	100	American cultural historian
Robert H. Shaffer	1915–2017	101	American educator
Akaki Shanidze	1887–1987	100	Georgian linguist and philologist
Eleanor Bernert Sheldon	1920–2021	101	American sociologist, president of the SSRC (1972–1979)
Peter Joseph Shields	1862–1962	100	American judge and activist who helped establish the University of California, Davis
Maria Simon	1918–2022	103	Austrian sociologist
Manouchehr Sotoudeh	1913–2016	102	Iranian geographer and scholar
Franz Karl Stanzel	1923–2023	100	Austrian literary theorist
Theodore Stern	1912–2013	100	American academic, 16th President of the College of Charleston
Paul Streeten	1917–2019	101	Austrian-born British economist and university professor
Aza Takho-Godi	1922–2025	102	Russian philologist
Cornelius Taiwo	1910–2014	103	Nigerian educator
Takeda Kiyoko	1917–2018	100	Japanese scholar
Patrick Lennox Tierney	1914–2015	101	American Japanologist
Mary Tortorich	1914–2017	102	American voice teacher
Tsien Tsuen-hsuin	1910–2015	105	Chinese-born American sinologist and librarian
Feliks Uciechowski	1920–2022	101	Polish politician and schoolteacher
G. Venkatasubbiah	1913–2021	107	Indian Kannada language lexicographer
Marie Wadley	1906–2009	102	American co-founder of the Five Civilized Tribes Museum
Frøystein Wedervang	1918–2018	100	Norwegian economist
Curt Weibull	1886–1991	105	Swedish historian
T. K. Whitaker	1916–2017	100	Irish economist
Xu Yuanchong	1921–2021	100	Chinese translator, professor, and scholar
Xue Muqiao	1904–2005	100	Chinese economist
Yang Jingnian	1908–2016	107	Chinese economist and translator
Silvio Zavala	1909–2014	105	Mexican historian
Władysław Żeleński	1903–2006	102	Polish lawyer, historian and publicist
Zhou Youguang	1906–2017	111	Chinese linguist and father of Pinyin
