= Shanghai University of Technology =

University in Shanghai, China

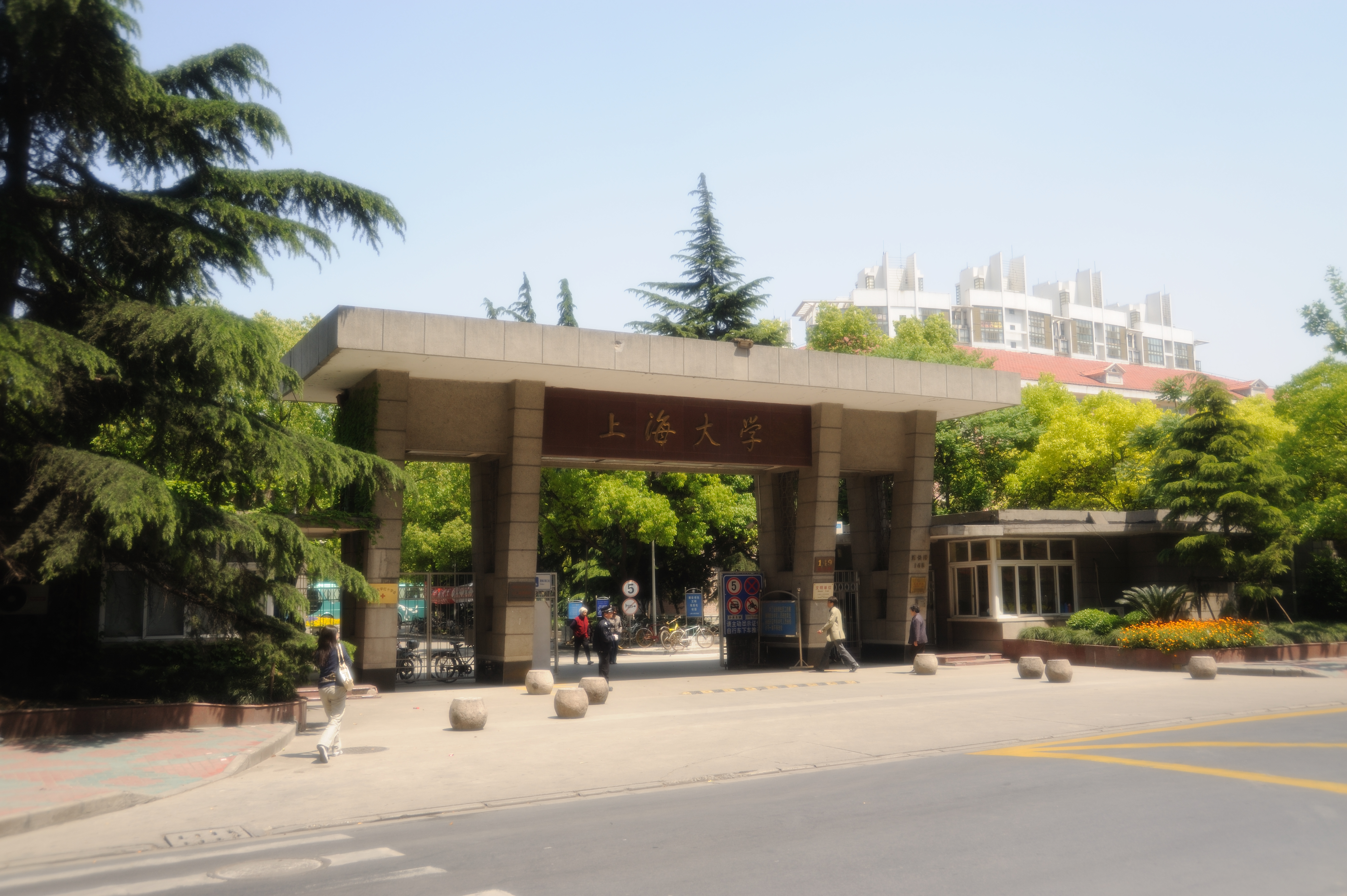
- Motto: 自强不息 (Self-Strengthening with Persistence)
- Type: Public
- Established: 1960, consolidated into Shanghai University in 1994
- Location: Shanghai, China

The Shanghai University of Technology (SUT; 上海工业大学; lit. 'Shanghai Industrial University') was a municipal public university from 1960 to 1994 in Shanghai, China. The university merged with then Shanghai University of Science and Technology, then Shanghai University, and then Shanghai Science and Technology Senior Vocational School to establish the current form of Shanghai University in May 1994.

== History ==
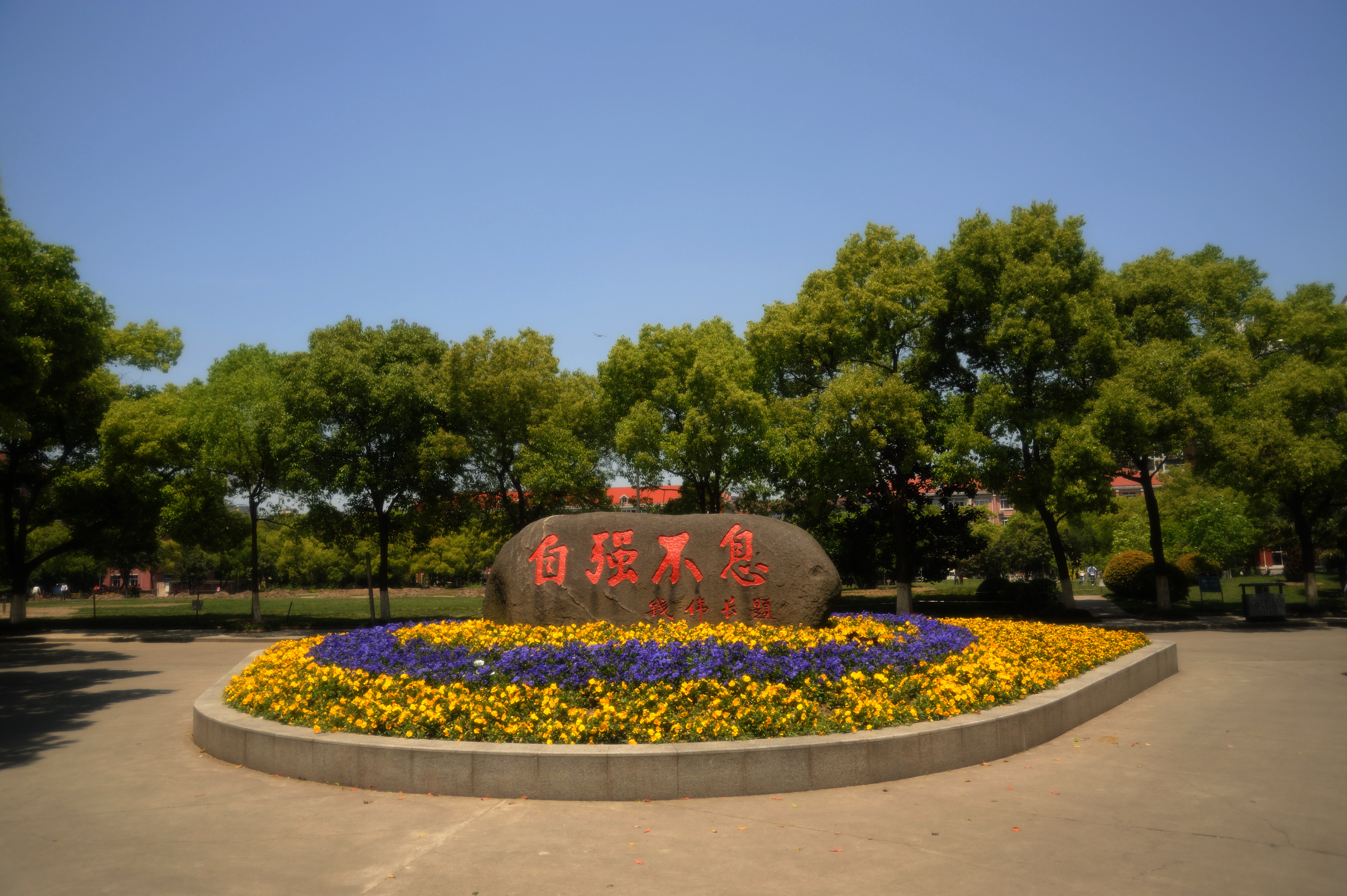

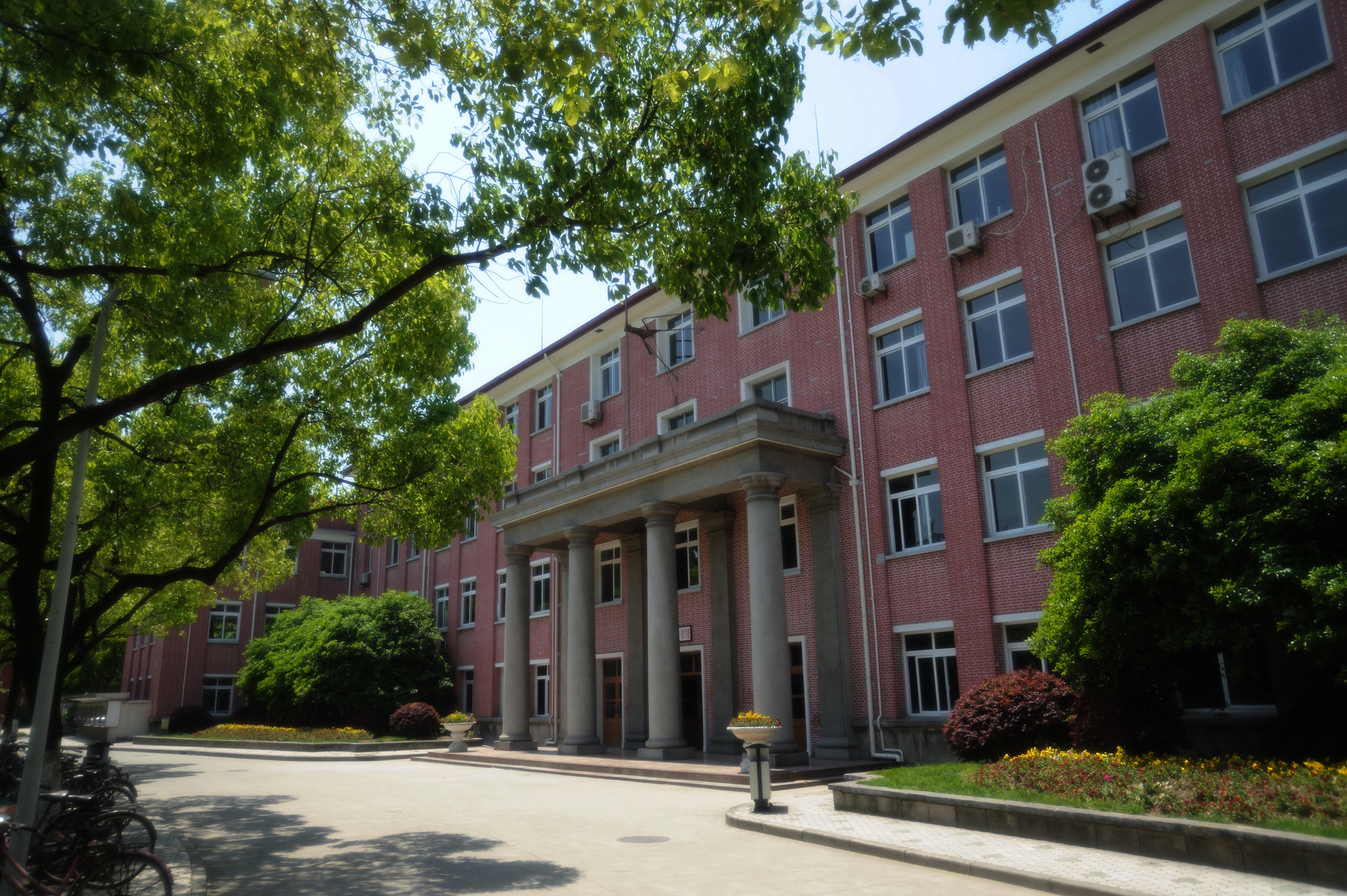
The NO.1 Teaching Building

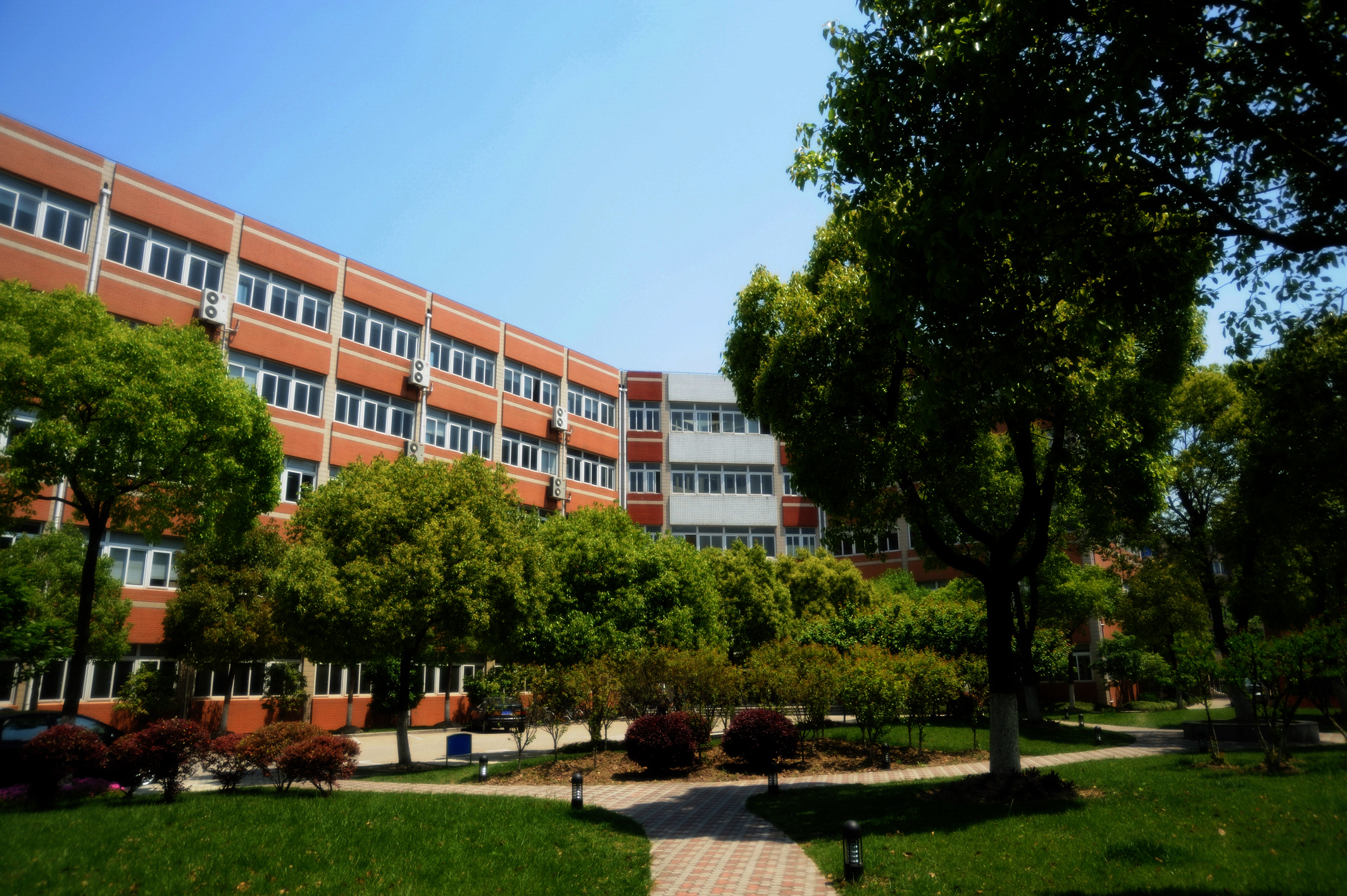
The Wenhui Library

Shanghai University was rebuilt in 1994, by merging Shanghai University of Technology (上海工业大学), Shanghai University of Science & Technology (上海科技大学), Shanghai Institute of Science & Technology (上海科技学院) and the former Shanghai University.

Shanghai University of Technology was once Shanghai Institute of Technology (上海工学院) founded in 1960, with strong background from engineering, technology and industries. The institute was renamed as Shanghai University of Technology in 1979. Professor Qian Weichang (钱伟长) was the president of the university since 1982 and eventually led to the consolidated Shanghai University in 1994.

== Location ==
Shanghai University of Technology site now is Shanghai University, Yanchang Campus.

149 Yanchang RD, Shanghai 200072, China

上海市延长路149号

== President ==
WeiChang Chien 钱伟长 (1982–1994)
