= Hermann Fränkel =

German classical scholar (1888–1977)

- Born: Hermann Ferdinand Fränkel; May 7, 1888; Berlin, German Empire
- Died: April 8, 1977 (aged 88); Santa Cruz, California, U.S.
- Citizenship: United States
- Education: University of Göttingen
- Children: Hans Fränkel
- Scientific career
- Fields: Classical studies
- Institutions: Stanford University
- Academic advisors: Ulrich von Wilamowitz-Moellendorff; Franz Bücheler; Friedrich Leo
- Notable students: Bruno Snell

Hermann Ferdinand Fränkel (May 7, 1888 – April 8, 1977) was a German-American classical scholar. He served as professor of Ancient Greek philology at Stanford University until 1953.

Son of professor Max Fränkel and younger brother of Charlotte Fränkel, Fränkel studied classics at Berlin, Bonn and Göttingen. He later lectured at Göttingen, but was denied a professorship after the Machtergreifung. Eluding increasing racial discrimination by the Nazis, Fränkel immigrated to the United States in 1935. He was offered a professorship at Stanford shortly after. He also held guest professorships at University of California, Berkeley and Cornell University.

Fränkel made important contributions to Early Greek poetry and philosophy interpretation. His son Hans Fränkel became a noted scholar of Chinese literature.

== Bibliography ==
- 1921 Die homerischen Gleichnisse, Göttingen: Vandenhoeck & Ruprecht.
- 1930 Parmenidesstudien, Berlin: Weidmannsche Buchhandlung.
- 1945 Ovid: A Poet Between Two Worlds, Berkeley: University of California Press.
- 1951 Dichtung und Philosophie des frühen Griechentums, New York: American Philological Association.
- 1955 Wege und Formen frühgriechischen Denkens, Munich: Beck.
- 1957 Wege der Wissenschaft zur Wirklichkeit, Freiburg: H.F. Schulz.
- 1961 Apollonius Rhodius: Argonautica, Oxford: Oxford University Press (Oxford Classical Texts)
- 1964 Einleitung zur kritischen Ausgabe der Argonautika des Apollonios, Göttingen: Vandenhoeck & Ruprecht.
- 1968 Noten zu den Argonautika des Apollonios, Munich: Beck.
- 1974 Grammatik und Sprachwirklichkeit, Munich: Beck.
