= Max Fränkel =

German Jewish classical scholar, philologist, epigrapher and librarian

Max Fränkel (Landsberg an der Warthe, 11 March 1846 – Berlin, 10 June 1903) was a German Jewish classical scholar, philologist, epigrapher and librarian. His primary area of study was classical Greek. He did not interest himself in the physical stones of the inscriptions or archaeology but in the texts themselves. His collection of Greek inscriptions from Pergamon is still a standard reference source. He was the father of the archaeologist Charlotte Fränkel (1880-1933), and of the classicist Hermann Fränkel, who in 1935 emigrated to America.

== Publications ==
- De verbis potioribus, quibus opera statuaria Graeci notabant, Dissertation Berlin 1873
- Die attischen Geschworenengerichte. Ein Beitrag zum attischen Staatsrecht, Berlin 1877
- Die Inschriften von Pergamon, unter Mitwirkung von Ernst Fabricius und Carl Schuchhardt herausgegeben von Max Fränkel, 2 Bände, Berlin 1890–1895 (online)
- Epigraphisches aus Aegina, Berlin 1897
- Inscriptiones Graecae, IV. Inscriptiones Aeginae, Pityonesi, Cecryphaliae, Argolidis. Berlin 1902
