= Shanghai University of Science and Technology =

Former public university in Shanghai, China

- Type: Public
- Established: 1958, consolidated into Shanghai University in 1994
- Location: Shanghai, China

The Shanghai University of Science and Technology (SUST; 上海科学技术大学) was a public university from 1958 to 1994 in Shanghai, China. It merged with Shanghai University of Technology, former Shanghai University, and the Shanghai Institute of Science and Technology to establish the current Shanghai University in May 1994.

== History ==
Shanghai University was rebuilt in 1994, by consolidating Shanghai University of Technology (上海工业大学), Shanghai University of Science & Technology (上海科学技术大学), Shanghai Institute of Science & Technology (上海科技学院) and the former Shanghai University.

Shanghai University of Science & Technology was formed by East China Branch of Chinese Academy of Sciences in 1958, with close relationship with the academies and institutes.

== Location ==
Shanghai University of Science & Technology site now is Shanghai University, Jiading Campus.

20 Chengzhong Lu, Jiading District, Shanghai 201800, China

上海市嘉定区城中路20号

== President ==
Prof. Guo Benyu
