= Georg Loeschcke =

German archaeologist

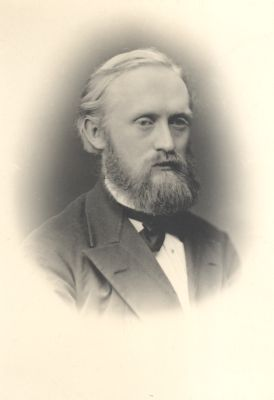
Georg Loeschcke

Georg Loeschcke (28 June 1852 – 26 November 1915) was a German archaeologist born in Penig, Saxony.

He studied archaeology under Johannes Overbeck at Leipzig, afterwards continuing his education at the University of Bonn, where he was a student of Reinhard Kekulé von Stradonitz. In 1877–78 he participated in a study trip to Greece and Italy under the aegis of the Deutsches Archäologisches Institut. As a result of this research, he published with Adolf Furtwängler, Mykenische Thongefäße, a landmark work that provided important historical timelines for Mycenaean pottery. In their investigations of Mycenaean pottery, Loeschcke and Furtwängler gave distinctions between it and Geometric pottery.

In 1879 Loeschcke became a professor of philology and archaeology at the Imperial University of Dorpat, where he co-authored another important work on Mycenaean pottery with Furtwangler, titled Mykenische Vasen (1886). In 1887 he was appointed first secretary to the Deutsches Archäologisches Institut in Athens, and two years later succeeded Kekulé as professor at the University of Bonn. At Bonn, he was dean to the faculty (1895/96), university rector (1909/10) and director of the university museum (1889–1912). In 1912 he again succeeded Kekulé, in this instance as professor of classical archaeology at the University of Berlin. In 1913 Loeschcke was appointed a member of the Prussian Academy of Sciences.

Loeschcke performed archaeological investigations of "Limes Germanicus", which were a series of frontier forts that bounded the ancient Roman provinces of Rhaetia and Germania Superior. He also performed investigations at the Kaiserthermen (Imperial Baths in Trier) and at the Roman camp in Haltern.

In 1915 he married fellow archaeologist Charlotte Fränkel.
