= Applied Mathematics and Mechanics (English Edition) =

- Discipline: Mechanics
- Language: English
- Edited by: Xingming GUO

Publication details
- History: 1980–present
- Frequency: Monthly
- Impact factor: 1.205 (2016)

Standard abbreviations
- ISO 4: Appl. Math. Mech. (Engl. Ed.)
- MathSciNet: Appl. Math. Mech. (English Ed.)

Indexing
- ISSN: 0253-4827

Links
- Journal homepage; Online access

Applied Mathematics and Mechanics (English Edition) is a peer-reviewed journal of mechanics, established in 1980 by Wei-zang Chien in 1980. Chien was the editor-in-chief from 1980 to 2002 and subsequently an honorary editor-in-chief. Xingming Guo is the editor-in-chief now. In 1980, it was quarterly, became bimonthly in 1981, and then monthly in 1985.

== Abstracting and indexing ==
The journal is abstracted and indexed in the following bibliographic databases:

- Abstract Journals:Mechanics
- Abstracts of Astronomical Publications
- Academic OneFile
- Applied Mathematics Reviews
- Chinese Academic Journal Comprehensive Evaluation Database
- Chinese Core Journal (selected ) Database
- Chinese Electronic Periodical Services
- Chinese Journal Full-Text Database
- Chinese Mathematics Abstracts
- Chinese Physics Abstracts
- Chinese Scientific and Technical Journal Database
- Computing and Technology
- Current Abstracts
- Current Contents/Engineering
- Current Mathematical Publications
- EBSCO
- EI-Compendex
- Engineering Index Compendex
- Expanded Academic
- INIS Atomindex
- INSPEC
- Journal Citation Reports/Science Edition
- Mathematics Reviews
- ProQuest Materials Science & Engineering Database
- ProQuest SciTech Premium Collection
- ProQuest Technology Collection
- SCImago
- SCOPUS
- Science Citation Index Expanded
- Summon by ProQuest
- The Net of Chinese Journal
- Transportation Information Research Services
- Web of Science
- World Translation Index
- Zentralblatt Math

According to the Journal Citation Reports, it has a 2016 impact factor of 1.205.
