= Shanghai Science and Technology Senior Vocational School =

Former vocational college in Shanghai

Shanghai Science and Technology Senior Vocational School (上海科技高等专科学院) was a municipal public technological vocational college from 1959 to 1994 in Jiading, Shanghai, China. The school was established as the Shanghai Second Science and Technology School by the Shanghai Municipal People's Government in 1959 and was renamed this name in 1981. In May 1994, the school merged with then Shanghai University of Technology, then Shanghai University of Science and Technology, and then Shanghai University to establish the current form of Shanghai University.
