= Zhou Youguang =

Chinese linguist and author (1906–2017)

- 周有光
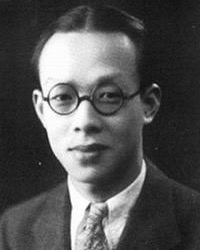
- Zhou in the 1920s
- Born: Zhou Yaoping; 13 January 1906; Changzhou, Jiangsu, China
- Died: 14 January 2017 (aged 111); Beijing, China
- Education: St. John's University; Guanghua University
- Known for: Development of pinyin; supercentenarian
- Notable work: The Historical Evolution of Chinese Languages and Scripts
- Political party: China Democratic National Construction Association
- Spouse: Zhang Yunhe (m. 1933; died 2002)
- Children: 2

Chinese name
- Chinese: 周有光
Transcriptions
Standard Mandarin
- Hanyu Pinyin: Zhōu Yǒuguāng
- Bopomofo: ㄓㄡ ㄧㄡˇ ㄍㄨㄤ
- Wade–Giles: Chou^{1} Yu^{3}-kuang^{1}
- IPA: [ʈʂóʊ jòʊkwáŋ]

Birth name
- Chinese: 周耀平
Transcriptions
Standard Mandarin
- Hanyu Pinyin: Zhōu Yàopíng
- Bopomofo: ㄓㄡ ㄧㄠˋ ㄆㄧㄥˊ
- Wade–Giles: Chou^{1} Yao^{4}-p'ing^{2}
- IPA: [ʈʂóʊ jâʊpʰǐŋ]

Zhou Youguang (Chinese: 周有光; pinyin: Zhōu Yǒuguāng, born Zhou Yaoping; 13 January 1906 – 14 January 2017), also known as Chou Yu-kuang or Chou Yao-ping, was a Chinese economist, linguist, sinologist, and supercentenarian. He has been credited as the father of pinyin, the most popular romanization system for Chinese, which was adopted by the People's Republic of China (PRC) in 1958, the International Organization for Standardization (ISO) in 1982, and the United Nations in 1986.

== Early life and career ==
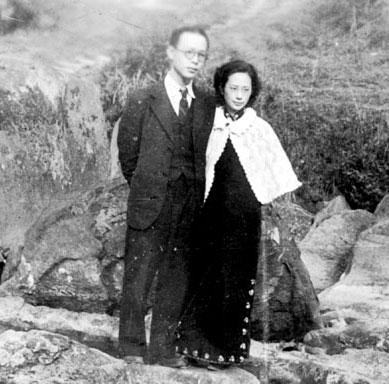
Zhou Youguang with his wife Zhang Yunhe in 1938

Zhou Yaoping was born in Changzhou, Jiangsu, on 13 January 1906 to a Qing government official. At the age of ten, he and his family moved to Suzhou. In 1918, he entered Changzhou Senior High School, during which time he first took an interest in linguistics. He graduated in 1923 with honors.

Zhou enrolled that same year in St. John's University, Shanghai where he majored in economics and took supplementary coursework in linguistics. He was almost unable to attend due to his family's poverty, but friends and relatives raised 200 yuan for the admission fee, and also helped him pay for tuition. He left in 1925 during the May Thirtieth Movement and transferred to Guanghua University, from which he graduated in 1927.

On 30 April 1933, Zhou married Zhang Yunhe. The couple moved to Japan for Zhou's studies, with Zhou enrolling as an exchange student at the University of Tokyo. He later transferred to Kyoto University due to his admiration of Hajime Kawakami, a Marxist economist who was a professor there at the time. Kawakami's arrest for joining the outlawed Japanese Communist Party in January 1933 meant that Zhou could not be his student. Zhou's son, Zhou Xiaoping, was born in 1934. The couple also had a daughter named Xiaohe (周小禾).

In 1937, due to the outbreak of the Second Sino-Japanese War, Zhou and his family moved to the wartime capital of Chongqing, where his daughter died. He worked for Sin Hua Bank before entering public service as a deputy director at the Ministry of Economic Affairs's agricultural policy bureau. Following the Japanese surrender in 1945, Zhou went back to work for Sin Hua; from there, he was stationed overseas: first in New York City, and then in London. While in New York, he met Albert Einstein twice while visiting friends at Princeton University.

For a time, Zhou participated in the China Democratic National Construction Association. He returned to Shanghai following the proclamation of the People's Republic of China in 1949, where he taught economics for several years at Fudan University.

== Design of pinyin ==
In 1955, Chinese premier Zhou Enlai, who had a preexisting friendship with Zhou, summoned him to Beijing and tasked his team with developing an alphabet for China. Although he had only worked as an economist up to this point, Zhou Enlai had recalled his fascination with linguistics and Esperanto. The Chinese government placed Zhou at the head of a committee tasked with reforming the Chinese writing system, with the goal being to increase literacy among the population.

While other committees worked to promulgate Standard Chinese as the national language, and simplify the forms of Chinese characters, Zhou's committee was charged with the development of an alphabet intended to eventually replace characters altogether. Zhou later recalled that the assignment was a full-time job, and ultimately required around three years of work. Zhou's team based aspects of pinyin on preexisting systems: its phonemes were inspired by Gwoyeu Romatzyh and Latinxua Sin Wenz, while its system of diacritics for representing tones was inspired by bopomofo. In 1958, the Chinese government adopted pinyin (formally "Hanyu Pinyin") as its official romanization system, though by this point its intended purpose was to accompany Chinese characters, rather than replace them.

In April 1979, on behalf of the Chinese government Zhou attended an International Organization for Standardization (ISO) conference in Warsaw, where he proposed that pinyin be adopted as an international standard. Following a vote in 1982, the scheme became ISO 7098. Since its initial promulgation, pinyin has largely replaced older systems like Gwoyeu Romatzyh and Wade–Giles.

== Later activities ==
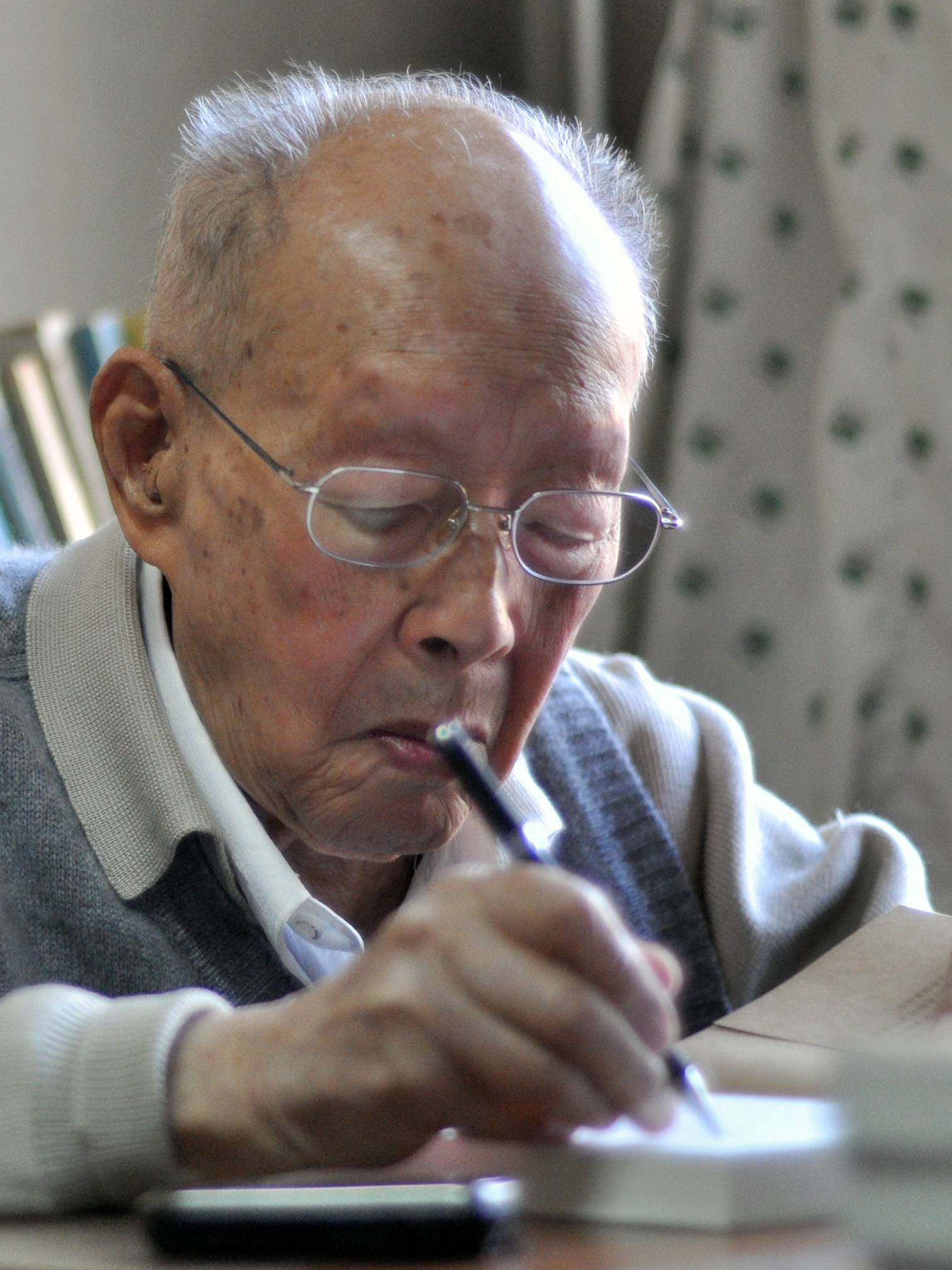
Zhou Youguang in 2012

As happened with many other intellectuals, Zhou was sent down to the countryside during the Cultural Revolution, where he spent two years in a labor camp.

After 1980, Zhou worked with Liu Zunqi and Chien Wei-zang to translate the Encyclopædia Britannica into Chinese, which earned him the nickname "Encyclopedia Zhou". Zhou continued writing and publishing after the creation of pinyin; for example, his book The Historical Evolution of Chinese Languages and Scripts (中国语文的时代演进; zhōngguó yǔwén de shídài yǎnjìn), translated into English by Zhang Liqing, was published in 2003. Beyond the age of 100, he published ten books, some of which have been banned in China.

Former Residence of Zhou Youguang in Changzhou, Jiangsu, China.

During a 2011 interview with NPR, Zhou said that he hoped to see the day China changed its position on the Tiananmen Square killings in 1989, an event he said had ruined Deng Xiaoping's reputation as a reformer. He became an advocate of political reform and democracy in China, and was critical of the Chinese Communist Party's attacks on traditional Chinese culture when it came to power in 1949.

In early 2013, Zhou and his son were interviewed by Adeline Yen Mah at their home in Beijing. Mah documented the visit on video, during which she presented Zhou with a pinyin game for the iPad that she had created. Zhou became a supercentenarian on 13 January 2016 when he reached the age of 110.

Zhou died on 14 January 2017 at his home in Beijing, one day after his 111th birthday. The cause of death was not made public. His wife had died in 2002, and his son had died in 2015. The following year, a Google Doodle featuring an animated logo in Chinese honored what would have been Zhou's 112th birthday.

== Books ==
Zhou was the author of more than 40 books, some of them are banned in China and over 10 of them published after he turned 100 in 2006.

Title	Pinyin	English title	Publication year
新中国的金融问题	Xīn zhōngguó de jīnróng wèntí	New China's financial problems	1949
汉语拼音词汇	Hànyǔ pīnyīn cíhuì	Chinese phonetic alphabet glossary	1950
中国拼音文字研究	Zhōngguó pīnyīn wénzì yánjiū	A study of Chinese phonetic alphabets	1953
资本的原始积累	Zīběn de yuánshǐ jīlěi	Primitive accumulation of capital	1954
字母的故事	Zìmǔ de gùshi	The alphabet's story	1954
汉字改革概论	Hànzì gǎigé gài lùn	On the reform of Chinese characters	1961
电报拼音化	Diànbào pīnyīn huà	Telegraph romanization	1965
汉语手指字母论集	Hànyǔ shǒuzhǐ zìmǔ lùn jí	Essays on Chinese Sign Language	1965
汉字声旁读音便查	Hànzì Shēngpáng dúyīn Biànchá	A handy guide to the pronunciation of phonetics in Chinese characters	1980
拼音化问题	Pīnyīn huà wèntí	Problems with Pinyin	1980
语文风云	Yǔwén fēngyún	The tempest of language	1981
中国语文的现代化	Zhōngguó yǔwén de xiàndàihuà	Modernization of the Chinese language	1986
世界字母简史	Shìjiè zìmǔ jiǎn shǐ	A brief history of the world's alphabets	1990
新语文的建设	Xīn yǔwén de jiànshè	Constructing new languages	1992
中国语文纵横谈	Zhōngguó yǔwén zònghéng tán	Features of the Chinese language	1992
汉语拼音方案基础知识	Hànyǔ Pīnyīn Fāng'àn jīchǔ zhīshì	Fundamentals of Pinyin	1993
语文闲谈	Yǔwén xiántán	Language Chat	1995
文化畅想曲	Wénhuà chàngxiǎng qǔ	Capriccio on culture or Cultural fantasia	1997
世界文字发展史	Shìjiè wénzì fāzhǎn shǐ	History of the worldwide development of writing	1997
中国语文的时代演进	Zhōngguó yǔwén de shídài yǎnjìn	The historical evolution of Chinese languages and scripts	1997
比较文字学初探	Bǐjiào wénzì xué chūtàn	A tentative study of comparative philology	1998
多情人不老	Duō qíngrén bùlǎo	Passionate people don't age	1998
汉字和文化问题	Hànzì hé wénhuà wèntí	Chinese characters and the question of culture	1999
新时代的新语文	Xīn shídài de xīn yǔwén	The new language of the new era	1999
人类文字浅说	Rénlèi wénzì qiǎnshuō	An introduction to human (written) language	2000
现代文化的冲击波	Xiàndài wénhuà de chōngjíbō	The shock wave of modern culture	2000
21世纪的华语和华文	21 Shìjì de huáyǔ hé huáwén	Written and spoken Chinese of 21st century	2002
周有光语文论集	Zhōu Yǒuguāng yǔwén lùn jí	Collection of essays by Zhou Youguang on the Chinese language	2002
百岁新稿	Bǎi suì xīn gǎo	Centenarian's essay	2005
朝闻道集	Zhāo wén dào jí	Essay collection	2010
拾贝集	Shi bèi jí	Selected essays	2011
今日花开又一年	Jīnrì huā kāi yòu yī nián	Today a new year blooms	2011
我的人生故事	Wǒ de rénshēng gùshi	My life story	2013
逝年如水 - 周有光百年口述	Shì nián rúshuǐ - Zhōu Yǒuguāng bǎinián kǒushù	"The years passed like water" - Zhou Youguang's oral recounting of his life	2015

== See also ==
- Yuen Ren Chao
- List of centenarians (educators, school administrators, social scientists and linguists)
