= Jin Di (translator) =

Chinese translator

- 金隄
- Born: September 1921; Wuxing County, Zhejiang, China
- Died: November 7, 2008 (aged 87); United States
- Education: National Southwestern Associated University
- Occupation: Translator
- Writing career
- Language: Chinese, English
- Notable work: Ulysses

Jin Di (Chinese: 金隄; pinyin: Jīn Dī or Chinese: 金堤; pinyin: Jīn Dī; September 1921 – 7 November 2008) was a Chinese translator. He was the first Chinese translator who translated James Joyce's Ulysses into Chinese language, a project that took 16 years to complete.

== Biography ==
Jin was born in Wuxing County (now Huzhou), Zhejiang, in September 1921.

After graduating from National Southwestern Associated University in 1945, he worked as a translator in the U.S. News Office in China. He started to publish works in early-1940s. In 1947 he taught at Peking University. In 1955 he was a translator in China Construction magazine. In 1957 he taught at Nankai University. After the Cultural Revolution in 1977, he taught at Tianjin Foreign Studies University.

Jin's translation career commenced when, in collaboration with British poet Robert Payne, he began to translate Shen Congwen's collection of stories, The Chinese Earth, into English and had it published in Britain in 1947. In 1978, at the invitation of the Chinese Academy of Social Sciences, he began translating James Joyce's famous novel Ulysses. In 1982, he went to live in the United States and continued his translation of Ulysses. In 1993, Taiwanese Jiuge Publishing House published Ulysses (Volume 1), and he became the first Chinese translator of Ulysses. A few months later, another version of Ulysses, translated by the couple of Xiao Qian and Wen Jieruo, was published, and there was some resentment between Jin Di and the couple.

He was a visiting professor at Oxford University, Yale University, University of Notre Dame, Drexel University, University of Virginia, National Humanities Center, University of Washington, University of Oregon. In 2005, Jin became the first Asian to be conferred with an honorable membership in the Irish Translators' and Interpreters' Association (ITIA). Jin died in the United States, on November 7, 2008.

== Translation ==
- Ulysses (尤利西斯)

== Awards ==
- 2001 "Senior Translator" – Chinese Translation Association
