= Chang Ch'ung-ho =

Chinese-American poet, calligrapher, educator and Kunqu opera singer

- 張充和
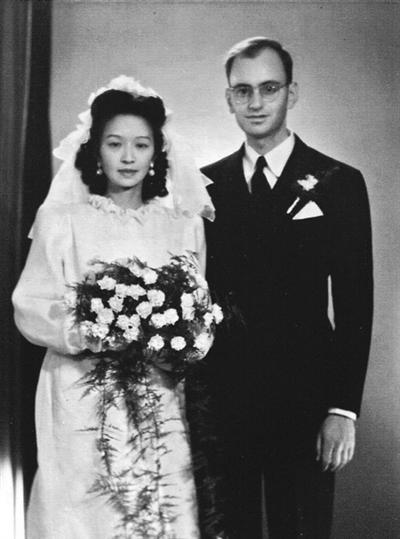
- Chang and her husband Hans Fränkel at their wedding in 1948
- Born: May 17, 1914; Shanghai, Republic of China
- Died: June 17, 2015 (aged 101); New Haven, Connecticut, United States
- Other name: Zhang Chonghe
- Education: Peking University
- Occupations: Educator, writer
- Notable work: Taohuayu
- Spouse: Hans Fränkel (m. 1948; died 2003)
- Children: Emma Fränkel, Ian H. H. Frankel
- Parent(s): Father: Zhang Wuling; Mother: Lu Ying
- Relatives: Sisters: Chang Yuen-ho, Chang Yun-ho, Chang Chao-ho

Chinese name
- Traditional Chinese: 張充和
- Simplified Chinese: 张充和
Transcriptions
Standard Mandarin
- Hanyu Pinyin: Zhāng Chōnghé
- Wade–Giles: Chang Ch'ung-ho

Chang Ch'ung-ho or Zhang Chonghe (Chinese: 張充和; May 17, 1914 – June 17, 2015), also known by her married name Ch'ung-ho Chang Frankel, was a Chinese-American poet, calligrapher, educator and Kunqu opera singer. She is hailed as "the last talented woman of the Republic of China" (民國最後一位才女).

== Life and career ==
Chang Ch'ung-ho (Zhang Chonghe) was born in Shanghai in 1914, with her ancestral home in Hefei, Anhui. Her great-grandfather, Zhang Shusheng (張樹聲), was a high-ranking military officer in the Huai Army. Her father, Zhang Wuling (張武齡), was an educator. Her mother, Lu Ying (陸英), was a housewife. She had six brothers and three sisters. Her eldest sister, Chang Yuen-ho (張元和; 1907–2003), was a Kunqu expert. Her second sister, Zhang Yunhe (張允和; 1909–2002), was also a Kunqu expert. Her third sister, Chang Chao-ho (張兆和; 1910–2003), was a teacher and writer, and the wife of the celebrated novelist Shen Congwen.

At the age of 21, she was accepted to Peking University. After graduating from PKU, Chang Ch'ung-ho became an editor for the newspaper Central Daily News.

In 1947, Chang met Hans Fränkel at Peking University, they married in November 1948, and settled down in the United States in January 1949. They had a daughter, Emma Fränkel (傅愛瑪) and a son, Ian Frankel. Ch'ung-ho taught at Yale University, Harvard University and 20 other universities, teaching traditional Chinese culture.

After the Cultural Revolution, Chang visited Suzhou in 1979.

In 1986, Chang Ch'ung-ho and her sister Chang Yuen-ho attended a theatrical performance which was commemorated the 370 anniversary of the death of Tang Xianzu in Beijing.

In the Autumn of 2004, Chang Ch'ung-ho held an exhibition of paintings in Beijing.

On June 17, 2015, Chang Ch'ung-ho died in New Haven, Connecticut, aged 101.

== Selected works ==
- Taohuayu (桃花魚) or Peach Blossom Fish
