= Wreaths at the Foot of the Mountain =

- Film poster
- Traditional Chinese: 高山下的花環
- Simplified Chinese: 高山下的花环
- Hanyu Pinyin: Gāo shān xià de huā huán
- Directed by: Xie Jin
- Written by: Li Zhun; Li Cunbao
- Produced by: Chen Junyang
- Starring: Lü Xiaohe; Tang Guoqiang; Sechen Guwa; Wang Yumei
- Cinematography: Lu Junfu; Zhu Yongde; Shen Jie
- Edited by: Zhou Dingwen
- Music by: Ge Yan
- Production company: Shanghai Film Studio
- Release date: 1 October 1984 (China)
- Running time: 139 minutes
- Country: China
- Language: Mandarin

Wreaths at the Foot of the Mountain (Chinese: 高山下的花环; pinyin: Gāoshān xià de huāhuán) is a 1984 Chinese film about the life of the soldiers in a PLA army company before, during and after the Sino-Vietnamese War. It is based on the novel written by Li Cunbao, and directed by Xie Jin, starring Lü Xiaohe, Tang Guoqiang, Siqin Gaowa, Gai Ke and He Wei.

The film won the 5th Golden Rooster for Best Screenwriter, Best Leading Actor (Lü Xiaohe), Best Supporting Actor (He Wei) and Best Editing (Zhou Dingwen) in 1985.
