= Shen Congwen =

Chinese writer (1902–1988)

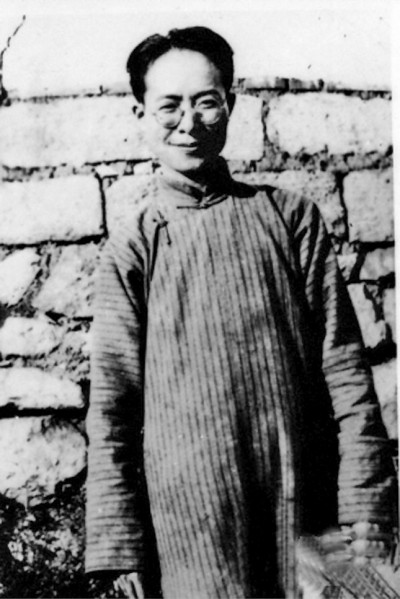
- Shen Congwen in 1938
- Born: Shen Yuehuan; 28 December 1902; Fenghuang, Hunan, Qing dynasty
- Died: 10 May 1988 (aged 85); Beijing, China
- Spouse: Zhang Zhaohe (1910–2003)

Chinese name
- Traditional Chinese: 沈從文
- Simplified Chinese: 沈从文
Transcriptions
Standard Mandarin
- Hanyu Pinyin: Shěn Cóngwén
- Wade–Giles: Shen Ts'ung-wen

Birth name
- Traditional Chinese: 沈岳煥
- Simplified Chinese: 沈岳焕
Transcriptions
Standard Mandarin
- Hanyu Pinyin: Shěn Yuèhuàn

Shen Congwen (沈从文; 沈從文; 28 December 1902 – 10 May 1988), formerly romanized as Shen Ts'ung-wen, was a Chinese writer. Born in the multiethnic region of western Hunan, Shen spent his early years roaming the frontier regions of southwestern China as a soldier and a tax collector. Following the New Culture Movement, he moved to Beijing and rose to prominence for his "native soil" literature featuring idyllic, ethnic cultures and colorful, underclass characters. In the 1930s, his advocacy of apolitical literature made him a target of attacks from left-wing writers. After the Communist takeover of Beijing in 1949, Shen attempted suicide. He subsequently abandoned literary writing under Communist rule, devoting the rest of his life to the study of historical artifacts and material culture. Shen was slated to win the 1988 Nobel Prize in Literature but died before it could be awarded.

== Life ==
=== Early life ===
He was born Shen Yuehuan (沈岳焕; 沈岳煥) on 28 December 1902 in the town of Fenghuang (then known as Zhen'gan) in west Hunan Province. In late adolescence he chose the name Shen. He was the fourth of nine children born to Shen Zongsi, a Han-Miao, and Huang Suying, a Tujia. His grandfather, Shen Hongfu, was a local hero who became a decorated general before being named acting commander-in-chief of Guizhou province at the age of 25. Due in large part to his grandfather's fame and fortune, Shen was born into a relatively well-off household. Following the founding of the Republic of China in 1912, his father hoped to become elected to the provincial assembly, but was instead forced to go into hiding in Inner Mongolia after joining a failed plot to assassinate President Yuan Shikai. The fact of Shen's mother's Tujia ethnicity and his paternal grandmother's Miao ethnicity, he keep secret until the 1980s. Despite his multi-ethnic background, he considered himself as a Miao.

Owing to his father's sudden disappearance, the family fortunes gradually diminished. Most of their land was sold off, and in 1917, after graduating from primary school, Shen was made to leave home. He joined a local reserve militia before joining the regiment in Yuanling (then known as Chenzhou) working as a clerk.

=== Education ===
Many early modern writers in China were well-educated, and some studied abroad, often in Japan. Shen, however, received a modest formal education. As a child he received private tutoring at home followed by a private family school. These private tutorials were conducted in an outdated, classical scholarly style which Shen criticized as neither useful nor interesting. In 1915, he began attending the Fenghuang town primary school, from which he graduated in 1917.

As a child he disliked school. In his autobiography, he describes frequently cutting class. According to Shen, this educational experience formed the foundation of his later professional and emotional life, "Having learned to use my eyes to take in everything in this world, to live amid all life, I found school unspeakably boring." This school-of-life brand of personal education is central to the image of Shen. Mo Yan, in his Nobel lecture given after receiving the Nobel Prize for Literature in 2012, compares himself to Shen, "I left school as a child, often went hungry, was constantly lonely, and had no books to read. But for those reasons, like the writer of a previous generation, Shen, I had an early start on reading the great book of life. My experience of going to the marketplace to listen to a storyteller was but one page of that book."

In 1923, after serving five years in the militia in Hunan, Shen left for Beijing to pursue higher education. Having failed the university entrance exam, he pursued independent study while auditing classes at Peking University.

In 1949, he was attacked on big character posters at the Peking University campus for not heralding the Communist cause. Suffering from depression and social ostracization, he slit his wrists and throat with a razor blade.

=== Career ===
On 22 December 1924, the Morning Supplement first published his essay An Unposted Letter (Chinese: 一封未曾付邮的信; pinyin: Yī fēng wèi céng fù yóu dē xìn). He began publishing short stories and essays regularly in Fiction Monthly and Crescent Moon, two highly influential literary magazines of the New Culture Movement. In 1925 Shen became a student of Professor Lin Zaiping, who introduced him to the famous modernist poet Xu Zhimo. In the 1930s he gained fame with his longer works such as Border Town and The Long River. In Beijing Shen met several influential figures of the New Culture Movement including Ding Ling and her husband Hu Yepin. He lived with the couple for some time before the three writers moved to Shanghai together in 1927.

In Shanghai, Shen, Ding and Hu edited a newspaper literary supplement called Red and Black and later The Human World Monthly, the literary supplement for the Human World Bookstore in Shanghai. In early 1929 the trio published the first edition of their own literary magazine called the Red and Black Monthly. At the time a philosophical battle was begun in the Shanghai literary scene concerning the proper role of writers and art in the forming of new Chinese society. On one side were the communists represented by the Creation Society whose slogan was changed to "Literature is the tool for class struggle!" Rival literary magazine The Torrent argued strongly against "proletarian revolutionary literature." The Crescent Moon Society was decidedly anti-political, and it is with this group that Shen found his literary philosophy fitted best.

By 1929, Shen, Ding, and Hu's publications had all failed while the political situation in Shanghai was increasingly hostile to writers not wholly allied with the Nationalists (KMT). Ding and Hu left for Jinan that year fearing that their political leanings would put them in danger if they stayed in Shanghai. As his two former partners began work at a high school in Jinan, Shen took a position as instructor of Chinese Literature and writer-in-residence at the Wusong Chinese Institute. Hu Shih president of the school and a founder of the Crescent Moon Society offered him the job, making a special exception for Shen who would normally not have been eligible for the position, lacking any academic degree. Hu Shi appreciated Shen's abilities, and Shen also joined the literati circle in Beijing.

In the fall of 1930, Shen moved to Wuchang where he taught a three-hour course at Wuhan University. In the spring of the following year, Shen returned to Hunan following the death of his father. Arriving back at the university in March, was too late for a reappointment and lost his teaching job there. He then taught at Qingdao University (renamed Shandong University in 1932) for two years before returning to Beijing. In 1933, Shen moved to Beijing with his wife, Zhang Zhaohe, and began work on his masterpiece, Border Town. The same year, he became the editor for the Art and Literature section of Tianjin's Da Gong Bao, one of the most influential magazines then.

After the Japanese invasion of 1937, Shen wrote little fiction. That year he fled Beijing, living for four months in Hunan in a city on the Yuan River, before finally fleeing to Kunming following the Japanese bombardment of Wuhan. In Kunming, he taught at National Southwestern Associated University.

The war ended in 1945 and Shen returned to Beijing in the summer of 1946. He taught at Peking University until 1949, when he was removed from his position in a political purge.

Shen was a particularly apolitical writer. In the early years of the People's Republic of China his resistance to the heavy politicization of the arts lead to him being publicly attacked in big character posters and subsequently to a mental breakdown. In early 1949, Shen drank kerosene and cut his throat and wrist in a suicide attempt. He never published another work of fiction, unable to write stories fitting the political requirements of the new regime.

In 1950, he began work at the Chinese Museum of History in Beijing, labelling artifacts and giving tours. His identity also began to change from a writer to a researcher of cultural relics, the main field is ancient Chinese costumes. During the cultural revolution, his job at the museum became a cleaning position, forcing him to spend his days scrubbing toilets. Shen was finally politically rehabilitated in 1978. That year, he left the museum for work with the Institute of History of the Chinese Academy of Social Sciences. In this part of his career, after 1950, he published many academic writings on Chinese art history.

In 1956, Shen was hired as a part-time consultant for the Weaving and Embroidery Research Group of the Palace Museum. In 1966, when the Cultural Revolution broke out, Shen was regarded as a "reactionary academic authority" and was subjected to criticism. Shen was sent to a May Seventh Cadre School in Xianning, Hubei province.

In 1980–81, Shen travelled to the United States on a study-lecture tour funded by the Chinese government. Despite the trip's government backing, he mostly avoided the subject of politics. Zhang Zhaohe's sister Zhang Chonghe and brother-in-law Hans Frankel, both of Yale University, provided the financial assistance which permitted Zhang Zhaohe to accompany him on the trip.

On 27 January 1981, after Shen arrived in the Western United States, he was invited to give lectures at three famous universities in the San Francisco Bay Area: Stanford University, University of California at Berkeley and San Francisco State University.

In 1983, Shen was diagnosed with cerebral thrombosis and his left side was paralyzed. He was nominated for the Nobel Prize in Literature by the Swedish sinologist Göran Malmqvist.

Shen was twice nominated for the Nobel Prize in Literature. Jeffrey Kinkley nominated Shen for the prize first in 1980 after returning from a trip to China where he interviewed the aging writer. He wrote to Swedish sinologist Göran Malmqvist inviting him to join the nomination. Later, in 1988 Malmqvist had become a member of the Swedish Academy and Shen made the list of finalists for the prize. Shen died later that year, before the prize could be awarded to him. He would have been the first Chinese writer to receive the award.

=== Marriage ===
In 1929, Shen was recruited by Hu Shi to teach in Shanghai. During this period, his student Zhang Zhaohe (known as "Black Peony") attracted Shen's attention, and he became one of Zhang's many suitors. However, Zhang had a poor impression of Shen, and his constant love letters also caused her some inconvenience. Shen's persistence finally touched Zhang and her family, and the two married in 1933. After their marriage, conflicts arose between them and they lived apart for a long time. Shen's scandal also caused a rift in their relationship, but they still accompanied each other through their lives. Shen was not immune to the political campaigns of the 1950s and 1960s. His apolitical stance brought abuses and taunts that in turn made him depressed, and he moved to a nursing home without Zhang, with whom he maintained a written relationship. Shen died in 1988. It was only when Zhang was sorting out his writings that she realized her lack of understanding of Shen and understood the hardship he had suffered.

Shen had two sons and a daughter with Zhang: Shen Longzhu and Shen Huchu and Shen Chaohui.

=== Death ===
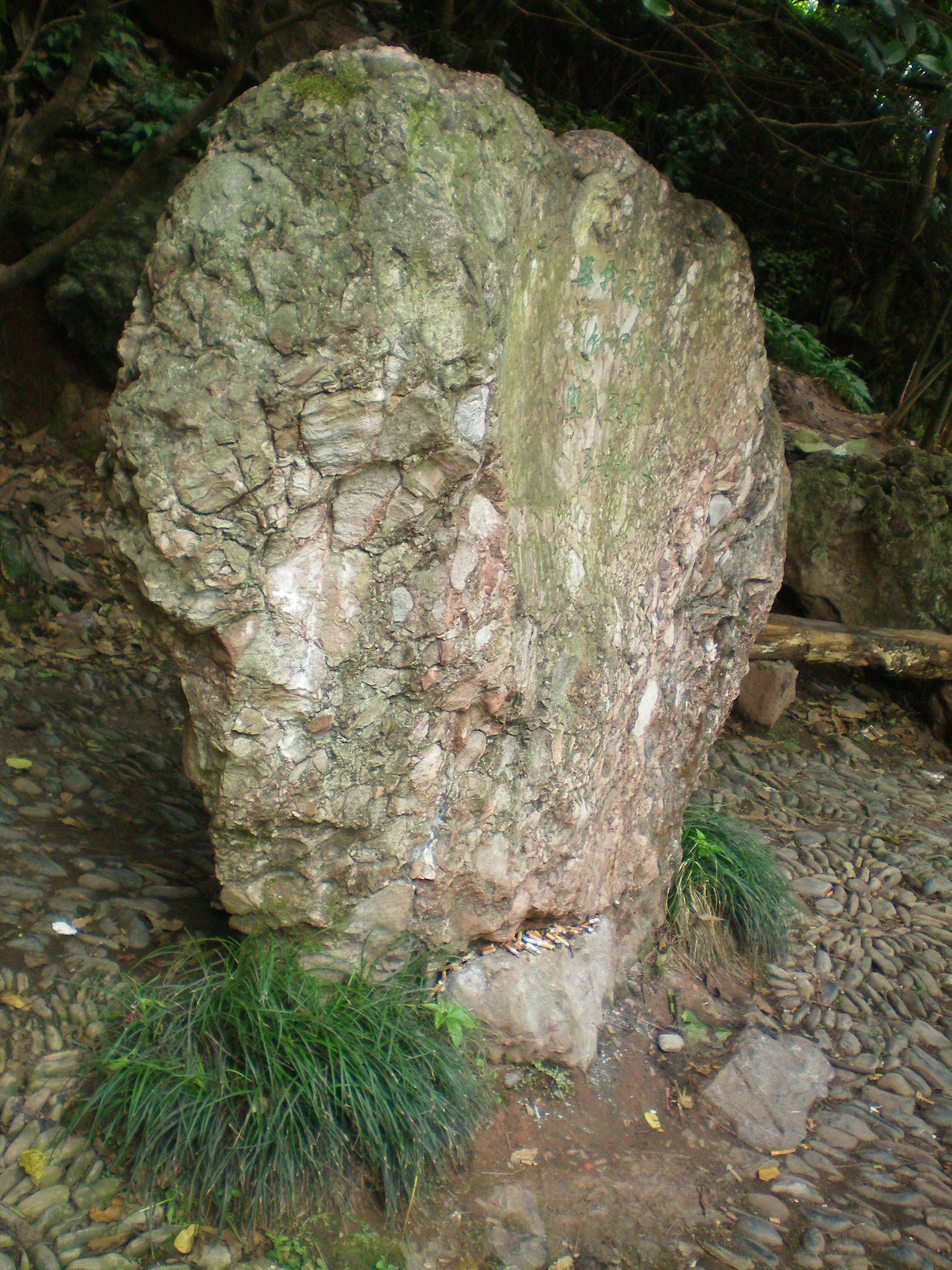
Shen Congwen Grave in Fenghuang County

Shen died of a heart attack on 10 May 1988 in Beijing at the age of 85. Despite his political rehabilitation several years earlier, the state-run media in China was silent upon his death. A one-line obituary was published four days later, calling him a "famous Chinese writer" and failed to mention his political troubles, the resurgence of his work, or the importance of his work in the canon of Chinese literature. The New York Times published a detailed, paragraphs-long obituary describing him as "a novelist, short-story writer, lyricist and passionate champion of literary and intellectual independence".

== Works ==
Although almost entirely unknown outside of China, Shen's oeuvre is considered vitally important inside China. His regional fiction with its use of folklore and local character has been compared to that of William Faulkner. He was a very prolific writer, producing more than 20 volumes of prose and fiction between 1933 and 1937. He published more than 200 stories and ten novels among other works. The more than five million characters of his written work are so diverse in both style and genre that Chinese literature scholar and Shen biographer Jeffrey Kinkley describes his work as a "Chaos of creativity". His early work includes lyric poems, one-act dramas, essays, and short stories written in a unique and varied style borrowing from regional language, naturalistic spoken dialogue, classical Chinese forms, and Western literary influences. Later, his works included several novels and novellas and eventually, after he stopped writing fiction in 1949, many scholarly, non-fiction volumes about calligraphy, art history, museum preservation and other topics relevant to the history of Chinese art and culture.

Two major thematic focal points of his early writing include military excesses and abuses in the country which he witnessed first-hand and the vanity of the urban bourgeoisie. The later is presented in contrast to his portrayal of the strength of the struggling commoner. My Education (Chinese: 我的教育; pinyin: Wǒ de jiàoyù), a short personal narrative written in the summer of 1929, is exemplary of Shen's many stories about his experiences with the militia. Included in Shen's first published collection of writings, the story describes the brutality and monotony that Shen witnessed in Huaihua in 1919 while stationed with an army company there.

Shen's style of creation tends to romanticism, and he demands the poetic effect of the novel, which combines realism and symbolism together. The language is simple with strong local color, which highlights the unique charm and charm of rural human nature. Shen's rural novels are typical rural cultural novels, which are not only in contrast with the urban "modern civilization" on the whole, but also always pay attention to the rural people's living mode, life footprint and historical destiny stipulated by different cultural collisions in the process of the western Hunan world's transition to modern times.

His works of fiction set in west Hunan have attracted the most critical attention. In these works he focuses on unassimilated Miao people who live in a traditional culture in the frontier region with the dominant Han culture and the modern world. With little first-hand experience of Miao life, Shen based these stories on his own imagination, life experiences and Miao legends told to him by his nursemaid and his country relatives. The descriptive nouns in the novel contain a great deal of western Hunan folk culture and skillfully apply proverbs and folk songs into the novel.

His 1929 short story Xiaoxiao (萧萧), about the life of a child bride in rural west Hunan was first published in Fiction Monthly. Shen revised the story in 1935. A film version of the story was made in the 1950s. In 1986 another, more popular film adaptation of the story was released. The film was one of the first mainland Chinese films commercially released in the U.S., where it was published under the title A Girl from Hunan. The film was screened in 1987 at the Cannes film festival in the "Un Certain Regard" section.

Long River (Chinese: 长河; pinyin: Cháng hé), written during the Sino-Japanese War, is considered the best of his long fiction while Lamp of Spring (Chinese: 春灯集; pinyin: Chūndēngjí) and Black Phoenix (Chinese: 黑凤集; pinyin: Hēifēngjí) are his most important collections of short stories.

Border Town (Chinese: 边城; pinyin: Biān Chéng), published in 1934, is a short novel about the coming of age and romances of an adolescent country girl named Cuicui in a mountain village in western Hunan, near the border with Sichuan province. The love dispute in the story revolves round Cuicui. Two brothers, Tianbao and Nuosong, who were always on the boat at Chadong Dock, fell in love with Cuicui at the same time. Cuicui only fell in love with Nuosong. Her grandfather only knew that Tianbao had come to ask for a bride, but he did not know what his granddaughter was thinking. The two brothers met to sing to get Cuicui to choose between them, but unfortunately encountered an accident. Shunshun and Nuosong misunderstood that Cuicui's grandfather was looking for another rich marriage for Nuosong. But Nuosong was still fond of Cuicui, and he left the city of Chadong along the river. Her grandfather became aware of this, and, depressed during a thunderstorm, died one night, while Cuicui was still waiting for Nuosong. A film adaption of the book was released in 1984, winning the Golden Rooster Best Director (Ling Zifeng) award and the Montréal World Film Festival Jury Special Mention the following year.

In addition, some of Shen's works focus on religion. For example, his 1941 novel The Candle Extinguished (Zhu Xu), is concerned with religiosity: with discovering God in life.

Shen's career as a scholarly writer, beginning after 1949, has received relatively little critical attention, but the works he produced in this period of more than thirty years are still notable because there have been three branches of modern Chinese rural literature: one is the Enlightenment literature represented by Lu Xun; one is the left-wing revolutionary rural literature; another is Shen's beautiful and quiet Xiangxi style literature. Five out the thirty-two volumes of The Complete Works of Shen Congwen are devoted to his later scholarly work.

His works were banned in Taiwan and his books were burnt throughout China. By the 1990s, his works started to be re-released and his legacy was restored. In 1995, his wife Zhang Zhaohe published Family Letters of Congwen, a collection of 170 of his personal letters sent from 1930 to 1983.

=== Translations ===
As of 2010, his works had been translated into ten languages. Seventy English translations have been made from 44 of his stories. In addition to the stories published in translation in general anthologies of Chinese literature and those published in journals, several anthologies of his work and one monograph have been published in English.

- The Chinese Earth – Stories by Shen Ts'ung-wen, translated by Jin Di, published by George Allen & Unwin, Ltd. in 1947, reprinted by Columbia University Press, 1982
- The Border Town and Other Stories, edited by Gladys Yang, Chinese Literature Press, 1981
- Recollections of West Hunan, translated by Gladys Yang, Panda Books, 1982
- Imperfect Paradise, translated by Jeffrey Kinkley et al., edited by Jeffrey Kinkley, University of Hawaii Press, 1995
- Selected Stories by Shen Congwen, edited by Yang Xianyi and Gladys Yang, Chinese Literature Press, 1999
- Selected Short Stories of Shen Congwen, translated and edited by Jeffrey Kinkley, 2004
- Border Town, translated by Jeffrey Kinkley, HarperCollins, 2009

== Portrait ==
- Shen Congwen. A Portrait by Kong Kai Ming at Portrait Gallery of Chinese Writers (Hong Kong Baptist University Library).
