= Elvira Fölzer =

German classical archaeologist

Elvira Louiza Helene Fölzer
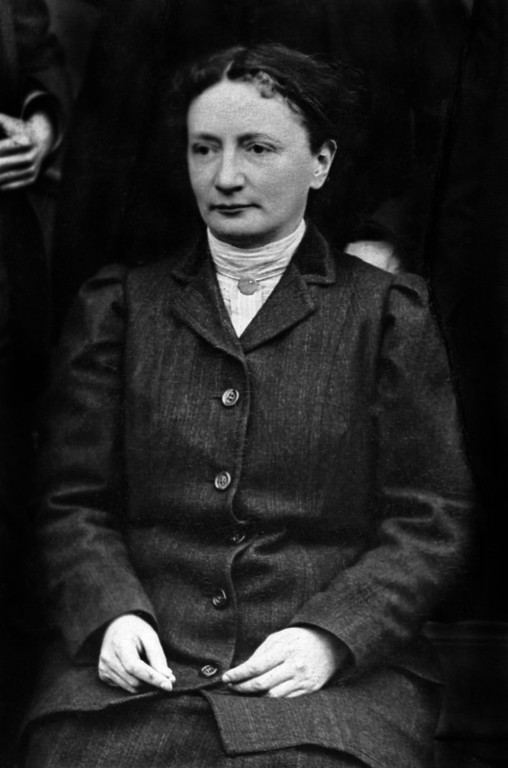
- Elvira Fölzer in 1909
- Born: 26 June 1868; Wandsbek, Hamburg, Germany
- Died: 5 July 1937 (aged 69)
- Occupation: Classical archaeologist
- Known for: First woman to earn a doctorate at the University of Bonn, research on Roman terra sigillata pottery

Elvira Louiza Helene Fölzer (26 June 1868 – 5 July 1937) was a German classical archaeologist. With a thesis on Ancient Greek vases, she was the first woman to earn a doctorate at the University of Bonn. As a researcher at the Provincial Museum in Trier, she went on to investigate the origins of the city's terra sigillata Roman pottery.

== Early life and education ==
Born on 26 June 1868 in the Hamburg district of Wandsbek, Elvira Louiza Helene Fölzer was the younger daughter of the Jewish merchant Ferdinand Heinrich Fölzer (1822–1893), also German consul in Porto Alegre, Brazil, and his wife Ricarda née Bormann-da Maja, whom he married there in 1853. In 1867, the family moved to Wandsbek-Marienthal. After schooling in Wandsbeck, she matriculated from the state gymnasium (high school) in Dresden-Neustadt in 1899, already 31 years old. She then studied archaeology, classical philology and history of culture at the universities of Leipzig (1899–1901), Freiburg (1901–02), and Bonn (1902–05).

== Career ==
Fölzer twice applied for a grant from the German Archaeological Institute so that she could continue her work on Greek vases but was turned down because of her age. When she completed her studies, she was already 38. In the summer of 1906, she was offered employment as a researcher at the Provincial Museum in Trier. She wrote a number of short papers on Roman sites in the city and its surroundings, for example the excavations at Roden (Saar) (1907), a statue of Mars in Trier (1908), the Trier amphitheatre (1909), and a statue of Athena in Neumagen (1910). In particular, from 1908 she worked on the origins and development of local terra sigillata pottery. On its publication in 1913, considerable attention was given to her work Die Bilderschüsseln der ostgallischen Sigillata-Manufakturen: Römische Keramik in Trier (Decorated Bowls from the East Gaulish Sigillata Manufactories: Roman Pottery in Trier).

Despite the success of her book, she was passed over for a permanent management position at the Trier museum on both occasions she applied—in 1911 and again in 1918—with a man selected each time. With no further provision for her salary, she was forced to leave the museum on 30 March 1917. Until then, she had spent much of her time in Frankfurt, preparing the second volume of her silligata work. It was however never published.

There is no further information about her career, although she may have become a schoolteacher. In 1927, she was registered as a private tutor in Berlin and likely died in 1937. As a Jew, her name was removed from the list of members of the German Archaeological Institute in 1938.
