= Wang Yumei =

Chinese actress (1934–2022)

- Born: 28 October 1934; Jinan, Shandong, China
- Died: 13 April 2022 (aged 87)
- Occupation: Actress
- Awards: Golden Rooster Awards – Best Supporting Actress; 1985 Tan Sitong – Empress Dowager Cixi Hundred Flowers Awards – Best Supporting Actress; 1985 Wreaths at the Foot of the Mountain Golden Eagle Awards – Best Actress; 1997 Er Nv Qing Chang Best Supporting Actress; 1984 Wreaths at the Foot of the Mountain

Wang Yumei (Chinese: 王玉梅; 28 October 1934 – 13 April 2022) was a Chinese actress who has won a Golden Eagle Award, a Golden Rooster Award and a Hundred Flowers Award.

== Filmography ==
=== Films ===
Year	English title	Chinese title	Role	Notes
1964	After Harvest	豐收之後		
1981	In-Laws	喜盈門		Nominated—Golden Rooster Award for Best Supporting Actress
1982	A Capable Wife	內當家		
1982	Wild Chrysanthemum	山菊花		
1983	Ou Mei	欧妹		
1984	Tan Sitong	譚嗣同	Empress Dowager Cixi	Won—Golden Rooster Award for Best Supporting Actress
1984	Wreaths at the Foot of the Mountain	高山下的花環	Mrs. Liang	Won—Golden Eagle Award for Best Supporting Actress; Won—Hundred Flowers Award for Best Supporting Actress
1991	The True-Hearted	心香		Nominated—Golden Rooster Award for Best Supporting Actress
1993	The Wooden Man's Bride	五魁		
1995	A Kid's Kite	童年的風箏		
1998	Gold Marriage	金婚		
1999	Everybody's Darling	人見人愛		

=== Television ===
Year	English title	Chinese title	Role	Notes
2003	Hold Up the Blue Sky of Life	撐起生命的蘭天		
2010	Justice Bao 1	包青天之七俠五義	Bao Mian's mother	
