= Hans Fränkel =

German-American sinologist (1916–2003)

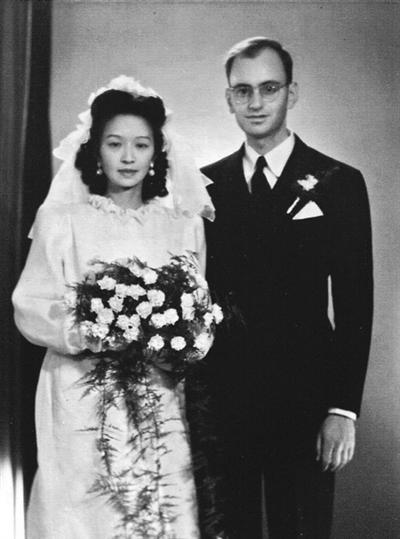
- Fränkel and his wife Chang Ch'ung-ho at their wedding in 1948
- Born: 19 December 1916; Berlin, Germany
- Died: 26 August 2003 (aged 86); North Haven, Connecticut, United States
- Education: Stanford University (BA); University of California, Berkeley (MA, PhD)
- Occupation: Sinologist
- Spouse: Chang Ch'ung-ho (m. 1948)
- Children: Emma Fränkel, Ian H. H. Frankel

Chinese name
- Traditional Chinese: 傅漢思
- Simplified Chinese: 傅汉思
Transcriptions
Standard Mandarin
- Hanyu Pinyin: Fù Hànsī
- Gwoyeu Romatzyh: Fuh Hannsy
- Wade–Giles: Fu Han-ssu

Hans Hermann Fränkel (19 December 1916 – 26 August 2003), usually Anglicized to Hans Frankel, was a German-American sinologist noted for his studies of Chinese poetry and literature. For 25 years, he was a professor of Chinese at Yale University.

== Life and career ==
Hans H. Frankel was born on 19 December 1916 in Berlin, Germany. His father, Hermann Fränkel, was a renowned scholar of Classical Latin and Greek. Because of the family's Jewish ancestry, the Fränkels fled to the United States during the Nazi Party's rise to power in the early 1930s. They settled in Palo Alto, California, where Hermann Fränkel became a professor of classics at Stanford University. Hans attended Stanford as an undergraduate, graduating with a Bachelor of Arts in 1937. He then attended the University of California, Berkeley, as a graduate student, earning an M.A. in Spanish in 1938 and a Ph.D. in Romance literature in 1942.

During World War II, Frankel worked for the US military as a translator of German, Spanish, and Italian. Military commanders recognized his linguistic talents, and he was encouraged to begin studying Chinese. After the war ended, Frankel moved to China, teaching Western languages at Peking University from 1947 to 1949. While at Peking University, Frankel met Chang Ch'ung-ho, a well-known poet, calligrapher and kunqu opera singer. They married in November 1948 and had two children.

Frankel and his wife returned to the United States in 1949, where he lectured and did research at Berkeley. He became an assistant professor of Chinese at Stanford in 1959, then went to Yale University in 1961, where he taught until his retirement in 1987. He published a large number of books and articles on Chinese poetry and literature, and his translation of the Ballad of Mulan was used in Disney's 1998 animated film.

== Selected works ==
- Biographies of Meng Hao-jan, (Berkeley: University of California Press, 1951; revised 1961).
- The Flowering Plum and the Palace Lady: Interpretations of Chinese Poetry, (New Haven: Yale University Press, 1976).
