= Liu Zunqi =

Chinese writer, reporter, and newspaper editor

Liu Zunqi (Chinese: 刘尊棋; pinyin: Liú Zūnqí; 1911–1993) was a Chinese writer, reporter, and editor-in-chief of China Daily.
