= The Border Town =

- Film poster
- Directed by: Ling Zifeng
- Written by: Li Juanpei; Ling Zifeng; Lao Yun
- Based on: The Border Town; 1934 novel by Shen Congwen
- Starring: Dai Na; Feng Hanyuani
- Cinematography: Liang Ziyong
- Music by: Liu Zhuang
- Production company: Beijing Film Studio
- Release date: 1984
- Running time: 100 minutes
- Country: China
- Language: Mandarin

The Border Town (Chinese name: 边城, Bian cheng) is a 1984 Chinese drama film directed by Ling Zifeng, adapted from the novel of the same name written by Shen Congwen. The film stars Dai Na and Feng Hanyuani in the leading roles. It tells a story about a border town which has little connection with the outside world in the early Republic of China. The film received a Special Mention of the Jury in the 9th Montreal World Film Festival and the Golden Rooster Award for Best Director.

== Plot ==
Cuicui is raised by her 70-year-old grandfather. 17 years ago, Her mother was pregnant before marriage and she committed suicide after giving birth to Cuicui by drinking cold water in the river. When Cuicui grows up, her grandfather begins to worry about her marriage, because he doesn't want Cuicui to have a miserable life like her mother. There is a rich man in the border town, who has two handsome sons that both fell in love with Cuicui. Cuicui likes the younger son while her grandfather misunderstands her feelings and thinks the older son is more suitable for Cuicui. Unfortunately, the older son dies in an accident and the rich man pins the blame on Cuicui's grandfather. Even though the younger son loves Cuicui, he can't marry her after the death of his dear brother. Finally, he chooses to leave the town. Cuicui's grandfather dies on a cold, rainy night, leaving Cuicui alone in the world. However, grief doesn't break her down. She takes over her grandfather's work, waiting for the younger son to come back.

== Cast ==
- Feng Hanyuani as Old boatman
- Dai Na as Cui Cui
- Hanpu Liu as Shun Shun
- Ming Bai as Shun Shun's wife
- Kui Liu as Tian Bao Da Lao
- Lei Shi as Nuo Song Er Lao
- Feng Jin as Yang Ma Bing
- Sida Yuan as Chang Nian
- Mingyan Peng as Than Zong's wife
