= 2022 deaths in the United States (January–June) =

- Decades: 2000s; 2010s; 2020s; 2030s
- See also: History of the United States (2016–present); Timeline of United States history (2010–present); List of years in the United States

The following notable deaths in the United States occurred in 2022 within the period January–June. Names are reported under the date of death, in alphabetical order as set out in WP:NAMESORT. A typical entry reports information in the following sequence: Name, age, country of citizenship at birth and subsequent nationality (if applicable), what subject was noted for, year of birth (if known), and reference.

== January ==
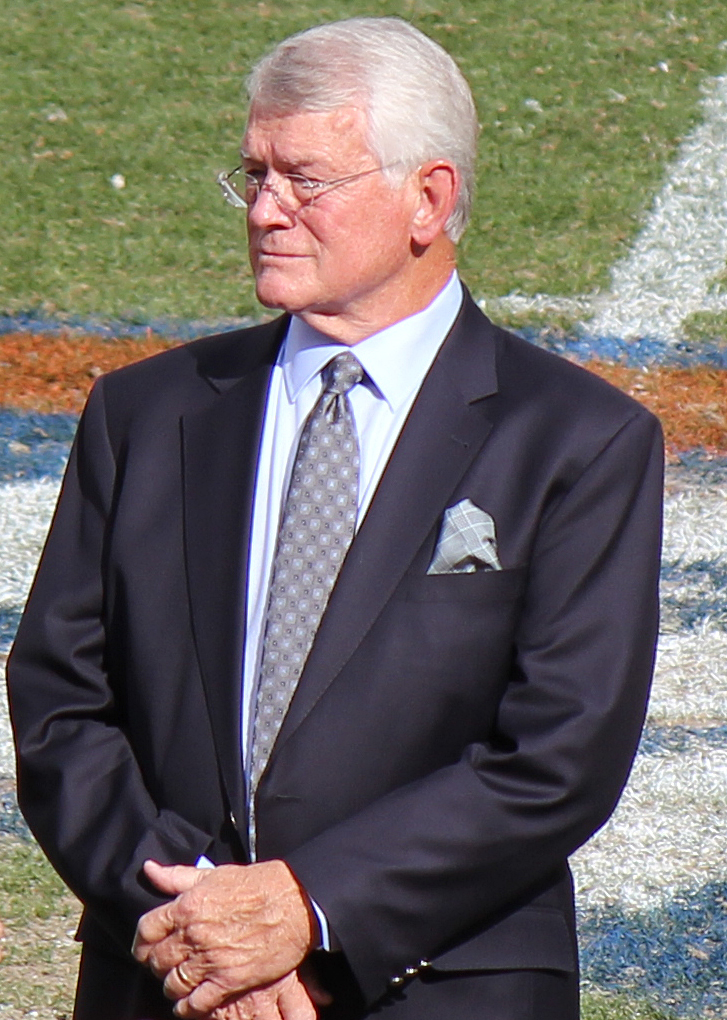
Dan Reeves

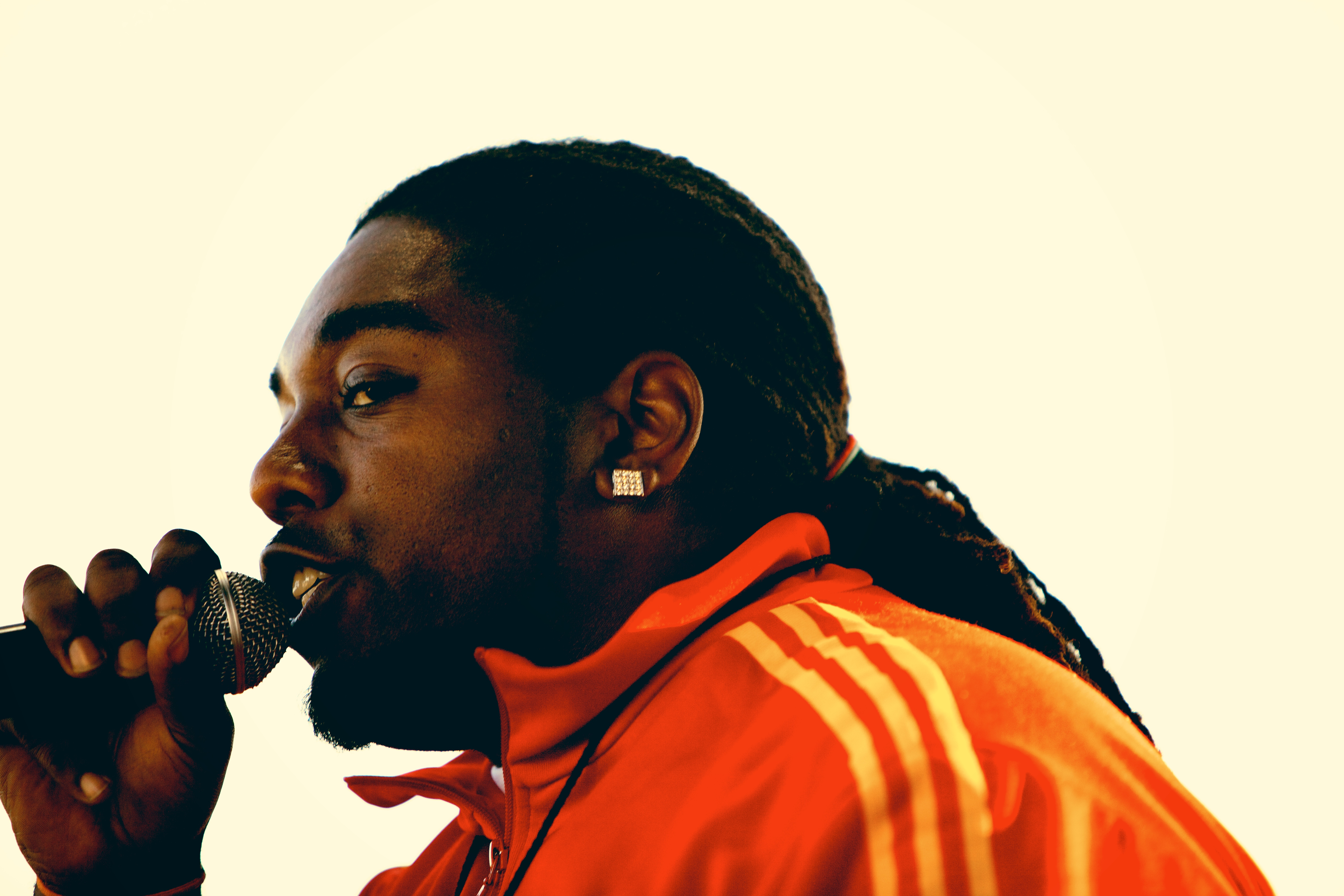
Traxamillion

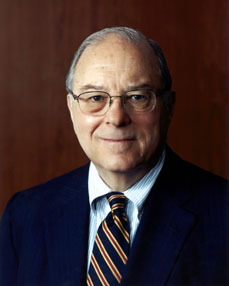
John D. Hawke Jr.

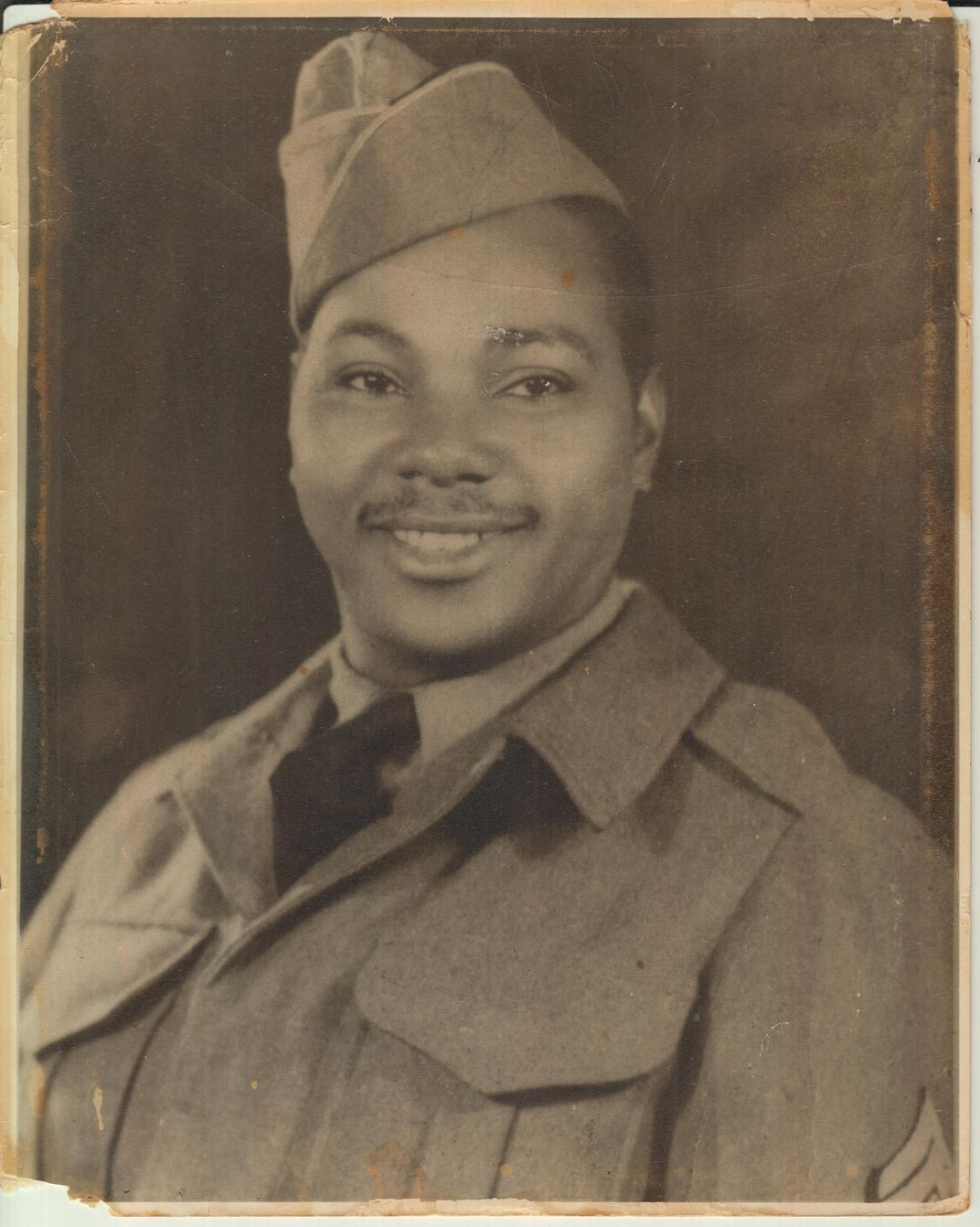
Lawrence Brooks

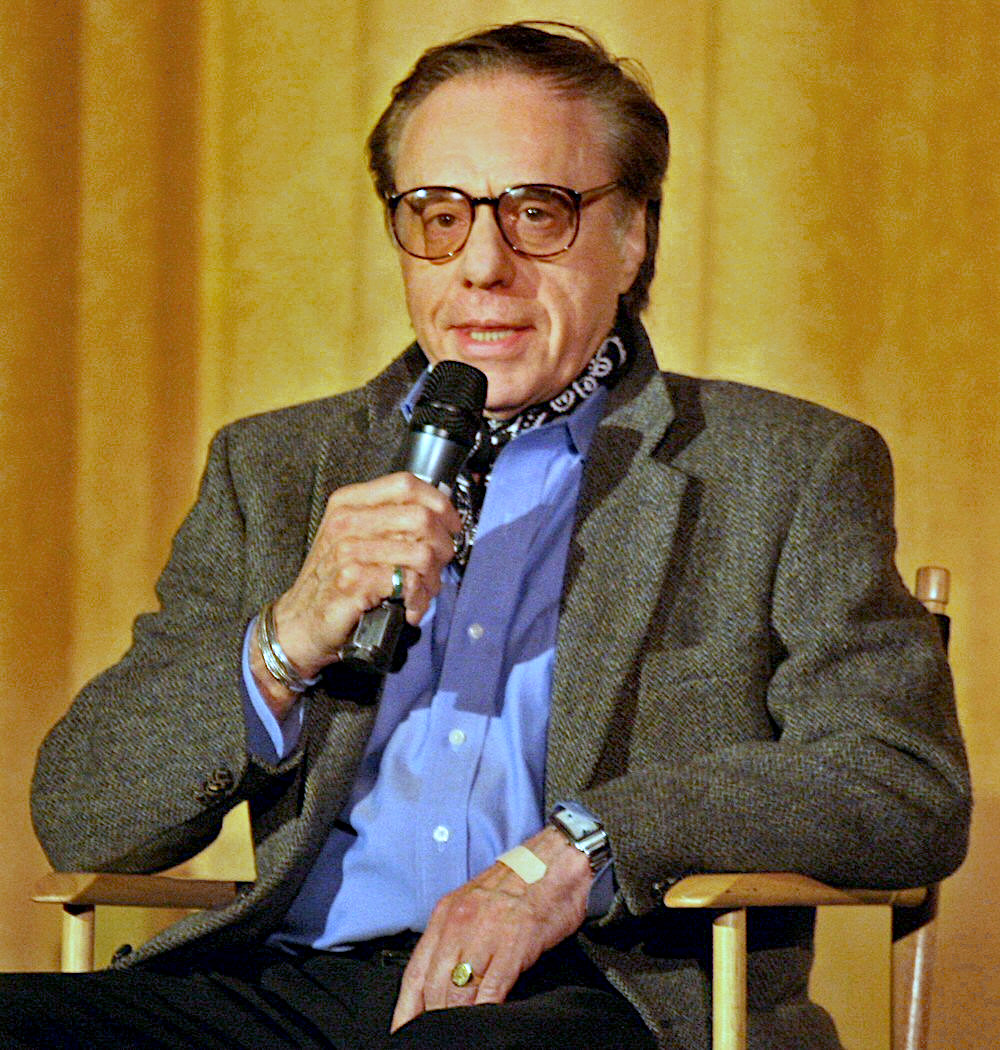
Peter Bogdanovich

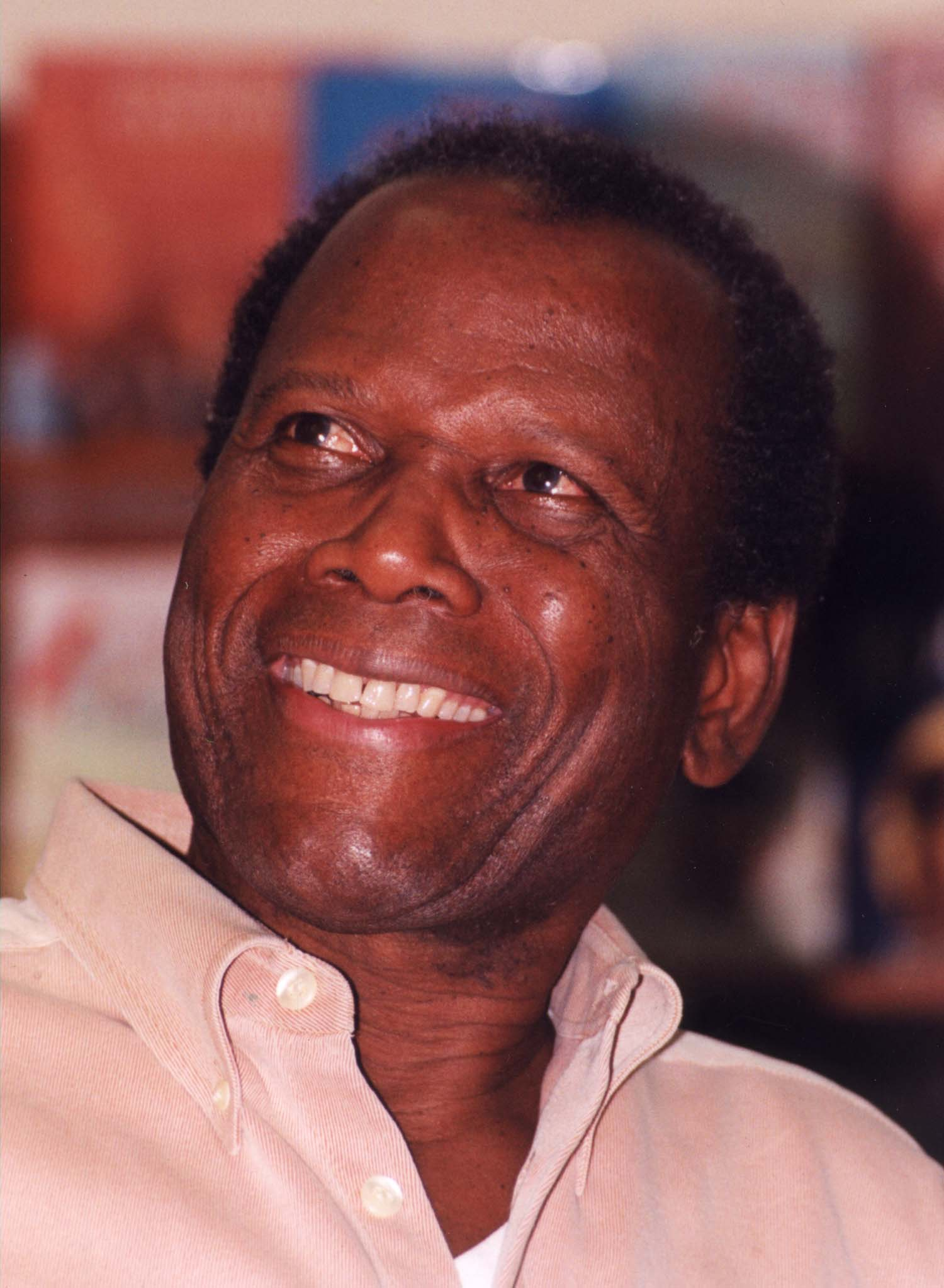
Sidney Poitier

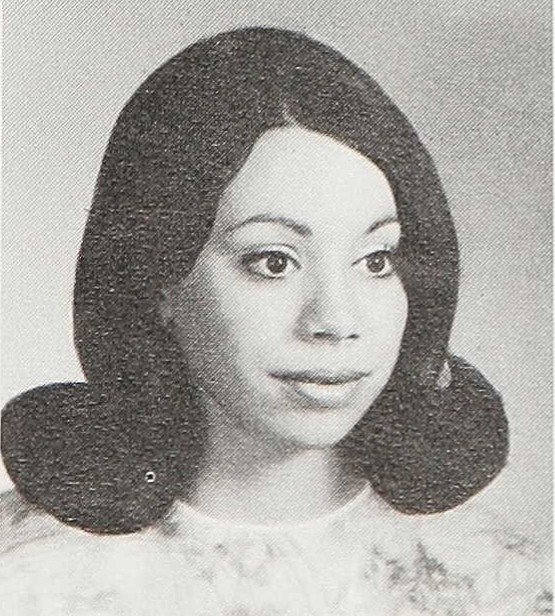
Maria Ewing

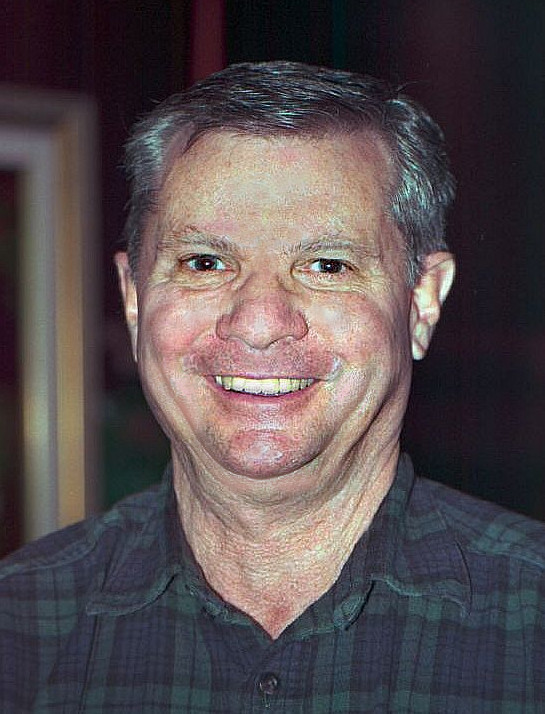
Dwayne Hickman

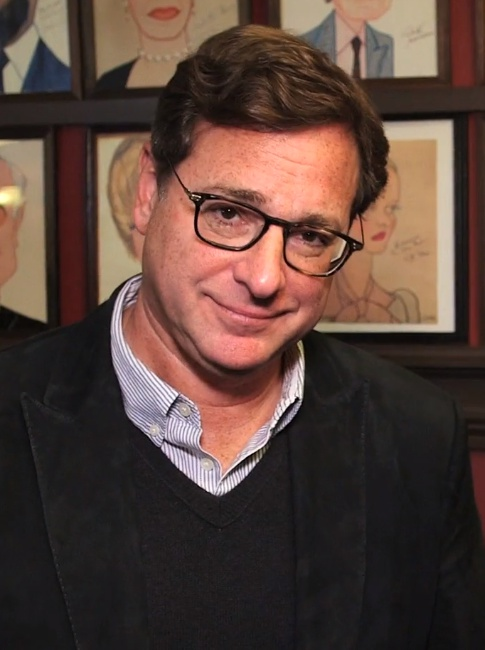
Bob Saget

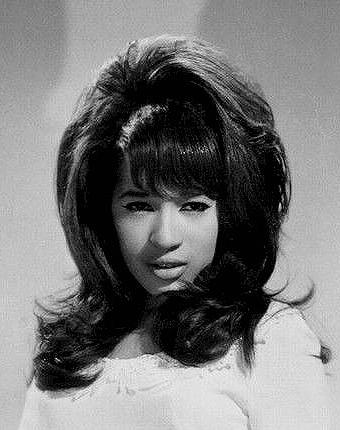
Ronnie Spector

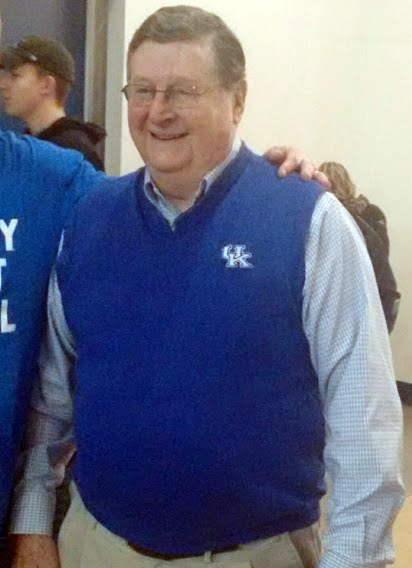
Joe B. Hall

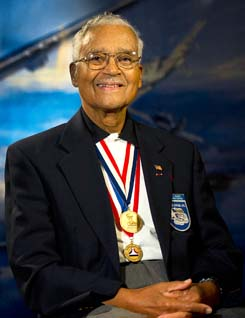
Charles McGee

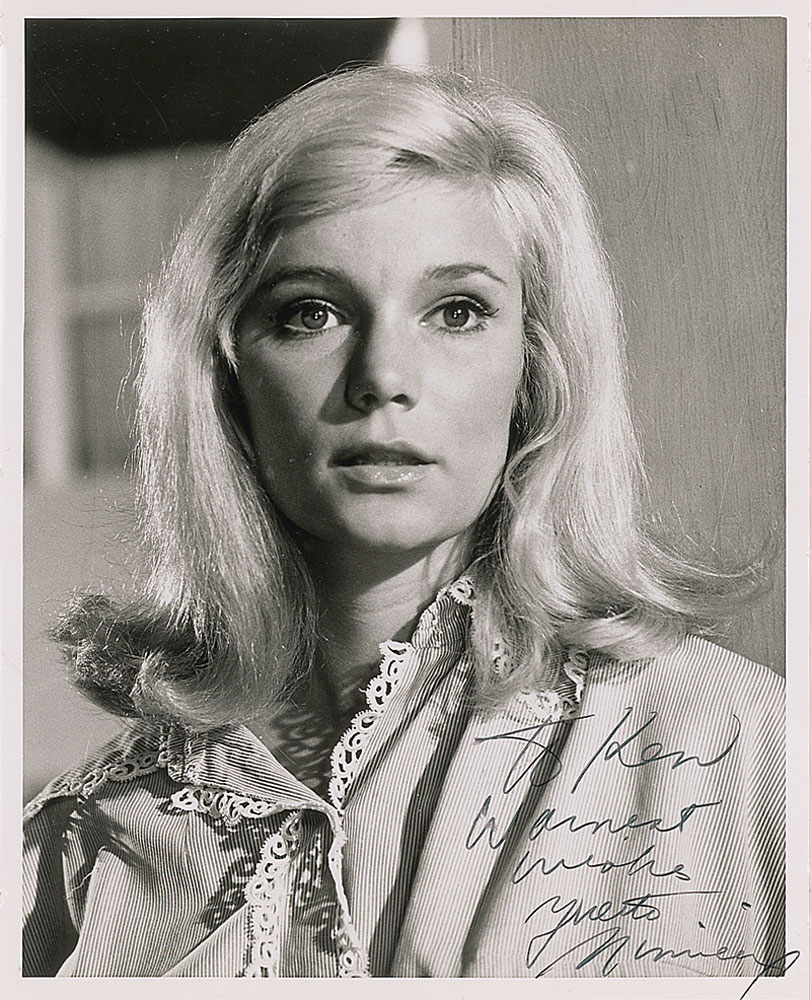
Yvette Mimieux

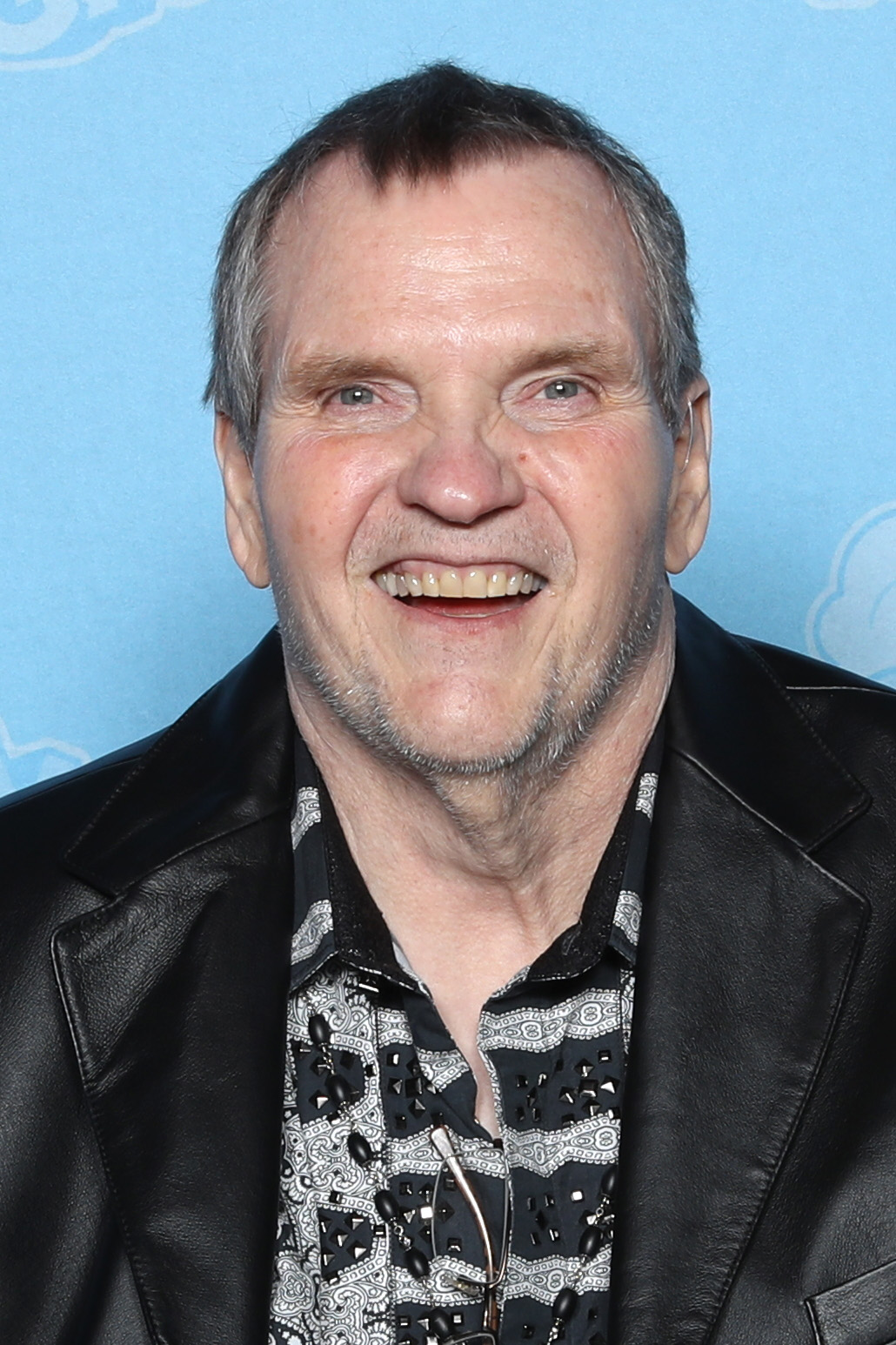
Meat Loaf

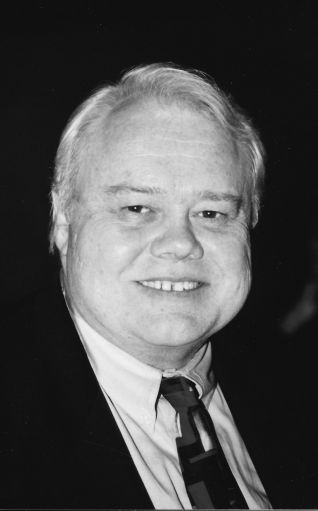
Louie Anderson

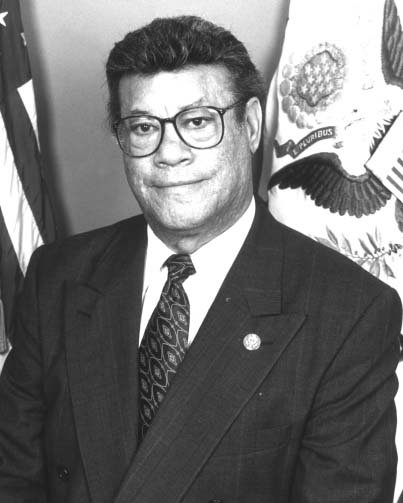
Esteban Edward Torres

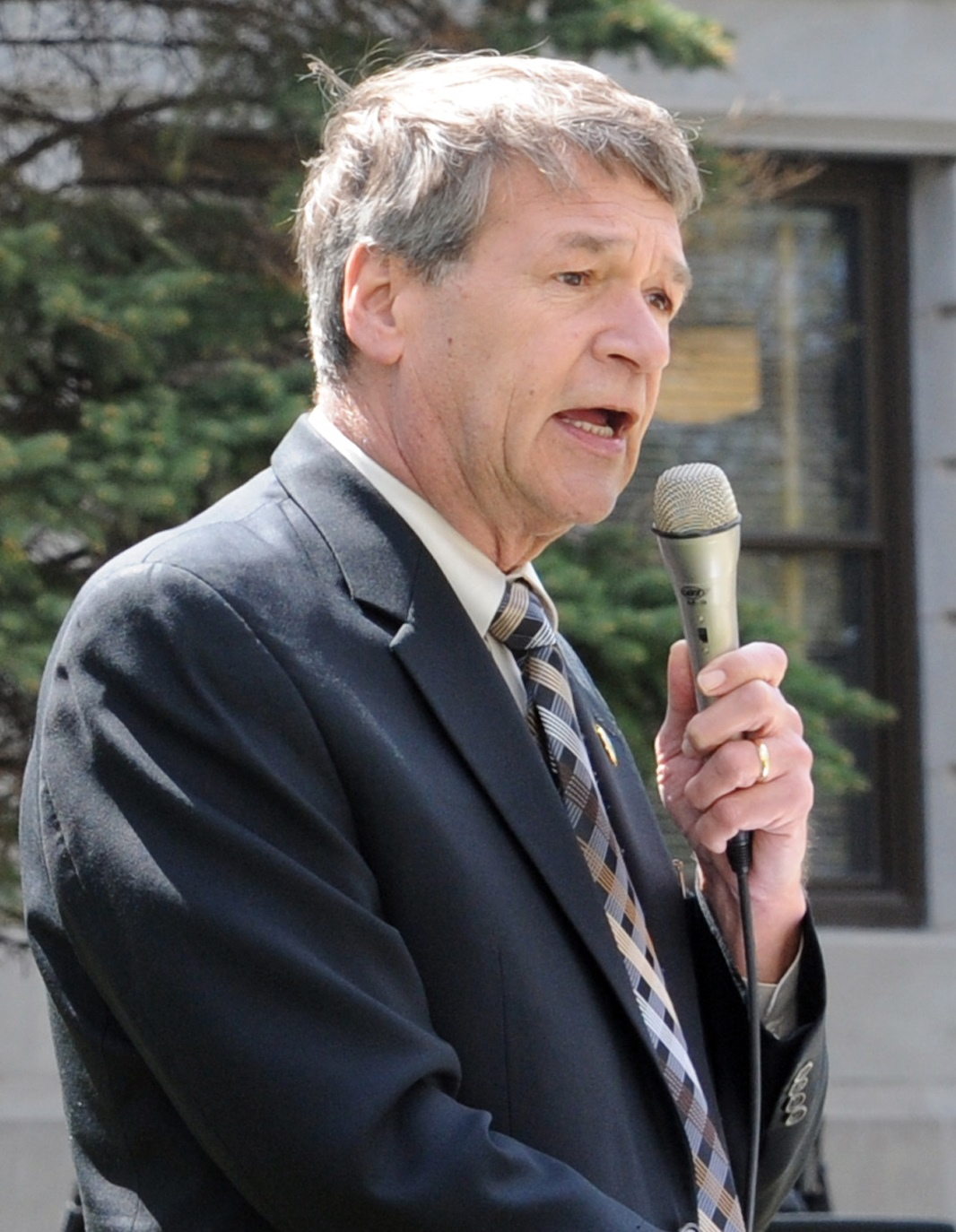
Wayne Stenehjem

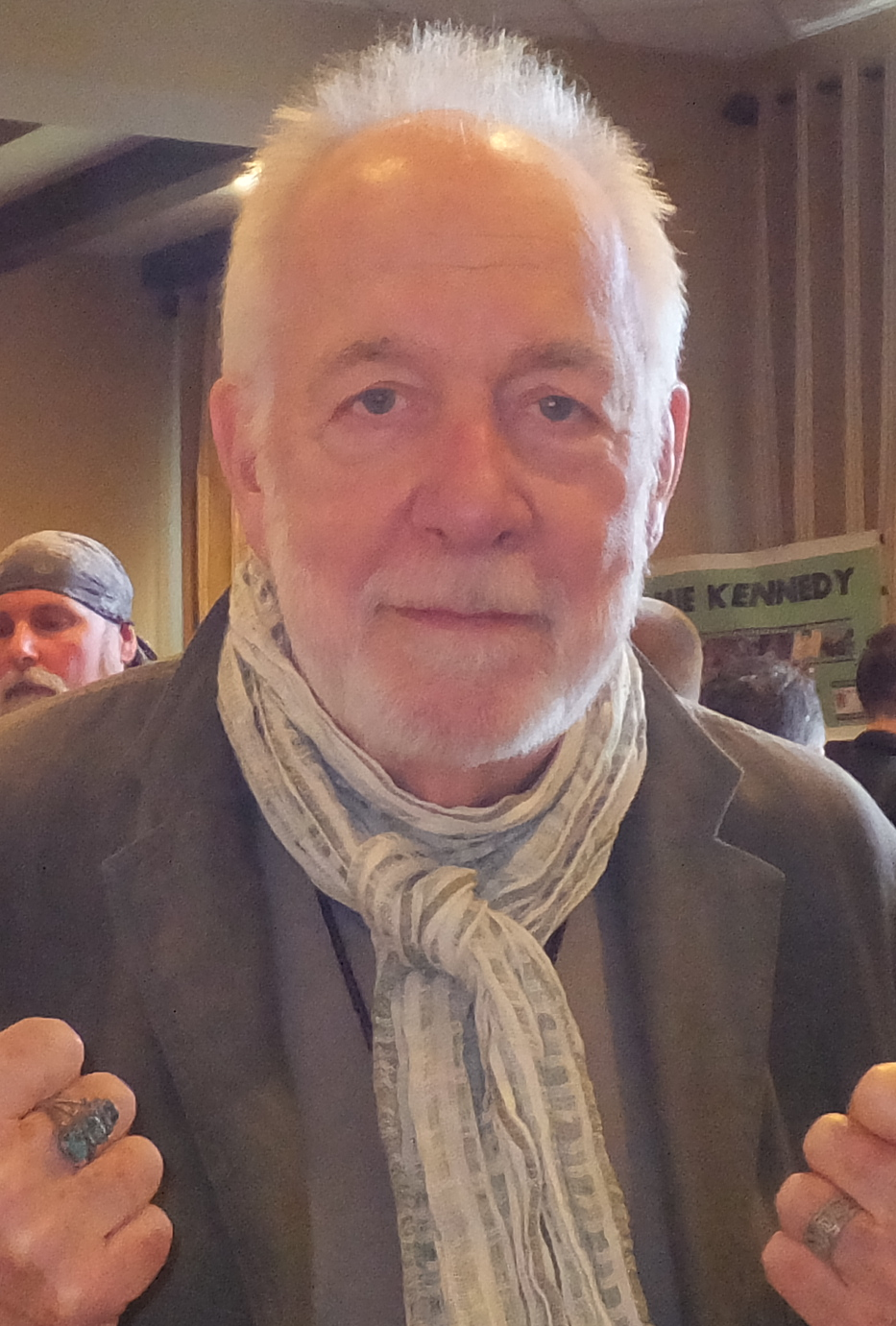
Howard Hesseman

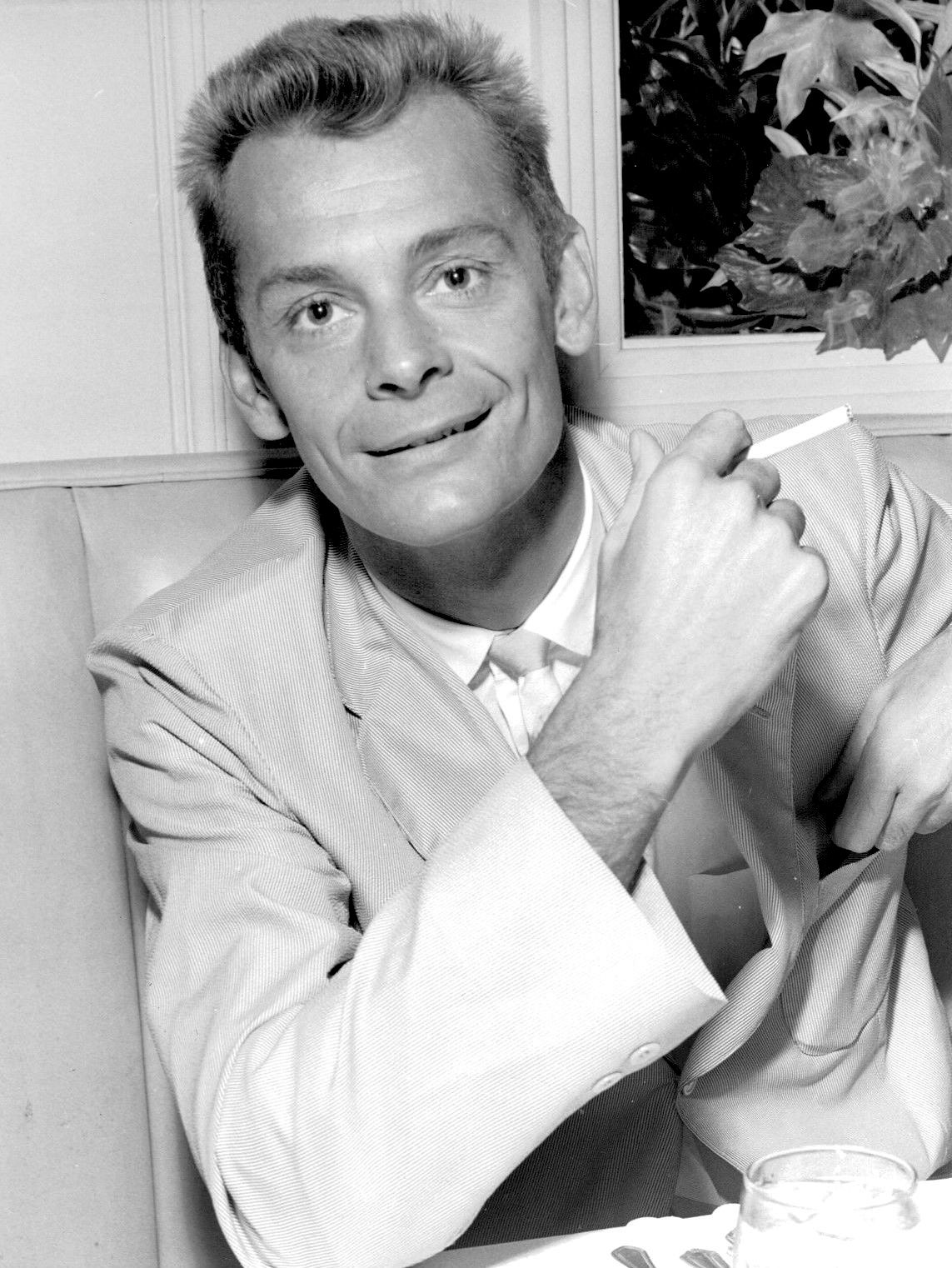
Carleton Carpenter

- January 1
  - Edna Brown, 81, politician, member of the Ohio Senate (2011–2018) and House of Representatives (2002–2010) (b. 1940)
  - Maurice Blanchard Cohill Jr., 92, jurist, judge for the U.S. District Court for Western Pennsylvania (since 1976) (b. 1929)
  - Richard Freed, 93, music critic (b. 1928)
  - Arnold Jeter, 82, college football coach (Delaware State, New Jersey City) (b. 1939)
  - Max Julien, 88, actor (The Mack, Getting Straight) and screenwriter (Cleopatra Jones) (b. 1933)
  - Dan Reeves, 77, football player (Dallas Cowboys) and coach (Denver Broncos, Atlanta Falcons), Super Bowl champion (1972) (b. 1944)
  - Ralph Staub, 93, football coach (Cincinnati Bearcats, Ohio State Buckeyes, Houston Oilers) (b. 1928)
  - Jim Toy, 91, LGBTQ activist (b. 1930)
- January 2
  - Larry Biittner, 75, baseball player (Chicago Cubs, Washington Senators/Texas Rangers, Montreal Expos) (b. 1946)
  - Da Hoss, 29, racehorse (b. 1992)
  - Jody Gibson, 64, convicted madam (b. 1957)
  - Bob Halloran, 87, sportscaster (CBS Sports) (b. 1934)
  - Traxamillion, 42, hip hop producer (b. 1979)
  - Jay Weaver, 42, bassist (Big Daddy Weave) (b. 1979)
- January 3
  - Odell Barry, 80, football player (Denver Broncos) and politician, mayor of Northglenn, Colorado (1980–1982) (b. 1941)
  - John D. Hawke Jr., 88, lawyer, Under Secretary of the Treasury for Domestic Finance (1995–1998) and Comptroller of the Currency (1998–2004) (b. 1933)
  - Jud Logan, 62, four-time Olympic hammer thrower (b. 1959)
  - Beatrice Mintz, 100, embryologist (b. 1921)
  - Jay Wolpert, 79, television producer (The Price Is Right) and screenwriter (Pirates of the Caribbean, The Count of Monte Cristo) (b. 1942)
- January 4
  - Ross Browner, 67, Hall of Fame football player (Cincinnati Bengals, Houston Gamblers, Green Bay Packers) (b. 1954)
  - Joan Copeland, 99, actress (Search for Tomorrow, Brother Bear, The Peacemaker) (b. 1922)
  - Jim Corsi, 60, baseball player (Oakland Athletics, Boston Red Sox) (b. 1961)
  - William M. Ellinghaus, 99, business executive, president of AT&T (1979–1984) (b. 1922)
  - William Terrell Hodges, 87, jurist, judge for the U.S. District Court for Middle Florida (since 1971) (b. 1934)
  - Tom Matchick, 78, baseball player (Detroit Tigers, Kansas City Royals, Milwaukee Brewers), World Series champion (1968) (b. 1943)
  - Darryl Owens, 84, politician, member of the Kentucky House of Representatives (2005–2019) (b. 1937)
- January 5
  - Josephine Abercrombie, 95, horse breeder (b. 1926)
  - Lowell Amos, 79, convicted murderer (b. 1943)
  - Robert Blust, 81, linguist and professor at the University of Hawaiʻi at Mānoa (b. 1940)
  - Lawrence Brooks, 112, supercentenarian, nation's oldest living man and oldest World War II veteran (b. 1909)
  - Dale Clevenger, 81, horn player, Grammy winner (1994, 2001) (b. 1940)
  - Ralph Neely, 78, football player (Dallas Cowboys), Super Bowl champion (1972, 1978) (b. 1943) (death announced on this date)
  - Greg Robinson, 70, football coach (Syracuse Orange, UCLA Bruins, Denver Broncos) (b. 1951)
- January 6
  - Peter Bogdanovich, 82, film director (The Last Picture Show, What's Up, Doc?, Paper Moon), actor and writer (b. 1939)
  - Ray Boyle, 98, actor (b. 1923)
  - Bob Falkenburg, 95, tennis player and entrepreneur (b. 1926)
  - Barbara Jacket, 87, track and field coach (b. 1934)
  - Sidney Poitier, 94, Bahamian-American actor (Lilies of the Field, Guess Who's Coming to Dinner, In the Heat of the Night), film director and activist, Oscar winner (1963) and Grammy winner (2001) (b. 1927)
  - Calvin Simon, 79, Hall of Fame singer (Parliament, Funkadelic) (b. 1942)
- January 7
  - Dee Booher, 73, professional wrestler (GLOW) and actress (Brainsmasher... A Love Story, Spaceballs) (b. 1948)
  - Edward Bozek, 71, Olympic fencer (1972, 1976) (b. 1950)
  - Mark Forest, 89, bodybuilder and actor (Goliath and the Dragon) (b. 1933)
  - Lani Guinier, 71, civil rights theorist (b. 1950)
  - John Swantek, 88, Polish Catholic prelate, prime bishop (1985–2002) (b. 1933)
- January 8
  - Eddie Basinski, 99, baseball player (Brooklyn Dodgers, Pittsburgh Pirates, Portland Beavers) (b. 1922)
  - Marilyn Bergman, 93, songwriter ("The Way We Were", "The Windmills of Your Mind", "You Don't Bring Me Flowers"), Oscar winner (1969, 1974, 1984) (b. 1929)
  - Don Dillard, 85, baseball player (b. 1937)
  - Michael Lang, 77, concert producer, co-creator of Woodstock (b. 1944)
  - Michael Parks, 78, journalist and editor (The Los Angeles Times, The Baltimore Sun) (b. 1943)
- January 9
  - Jim Bakhtiar, 88, football player (b. 1934)
  - Bill Boomer, 84, swim coach (b. 1937)
  - Moe Brooker, 81, painter, educator, and printmaker (b. 1940)
  - Maria Ewing, 71, opera singer (b. 1950)
  - Dwayne Hickman, 87, actor (The Many Loves of Dobie Gillis, The Bob Cummings Show, Cat Ballou) and television director (b. 1934)
  - James Mtume, 75, musician (Mtume) and songwriter ("Juicy Fruit") (b. 1946)
  - Bob Saget, 65, comedian, television presenter (America's Funniest Home Videos) and actor (Full House, How I Met Your Mother) (b. 1956)
- January 10
  - Robert Allan Ackerman, 77, film and theatre director (b. 1944)
  - Marion Brash, 90, German-American actress (b. 1931)
  - Robert Durst, 78, real estate executive and convicted murderer, subject of The Jinx (b. 1943)
  - Joyce Eliason, 87, television writer and producer (The Jacksons: An American Dream, Titanic, The Last Don, A Loss of Innocence) (b. 1934)
  - Don Maynard, 86, Hall of Fame football player (New York Titans / Jets, New York Giants, St. Louis Cardinals), Super Bowl champion (1969) (b. 1935)
- January 11
  - Clyde Bellecourt, 85, civil rights activist, co-founder of the American Indian Movement (b. 1936)
  - Jana Bennett, 66, American-born British media executive (b. 1955)
  - Orlando Busino, 95, cartoonist (b. 1926)
  - Jeffery Paul Chan, 79, author and scholar (b. 1942)
  - Jerry Crutchfield, 87, country and pop record producer, songwriter, and musician (b. 1934)
  - Richard Folmer, 79, actor (The St. Tammany Miracle, Mad Money, Straw Dogs) (b. 1942)
  - Tim Rosaforte, 66, golf writer (Sports Illustrated, Golf Digest) and broadcaster (ESPN) (b. 1955)
  - Don Sutherin, 85, Hall of Fame football player (Hamilton Tiger-Cats, Ottawa Rough Riders, Toronto Argonauts) and coach (b. 1936)
- January 12
  - CPO Boss Hogg, 52, rapper (b. 1969)
  - Everett Lee, 105, violinist and conductor (b. 1916)
  - Frank Moe, 56, politician, member of the Minnesota House of Representatives (2005–2008) (b. 1965)
  - Stephen H. Sachs, 87, politician, Attorney General of Maryland (1979–1987) (b. 1934)
  - Ronnie Spector, 78, singer and front leader of The Ronettes (b. 1943)
  - George O. Wood, 80, Pentecostal minister, general superintendent of the Assemblies of God USA (2007–2017) (b. 1941)
  - J. Robert Wright, 85, priest and church historian (b. 1936)
- January 13
  - Israel S. Dresner, 92, Reform rabbi (b. 1929)
  - Jim Forest, 80, writer and lay theologian (b. 1941)
  - Larry Forgy, 82, politician (b. 1939)
  - Donald Gurnett, 81, space physicist (b. 1940)
  - Brianna Kupfer, 24, university student and murder victim (b. 1997)
  - Darby Nelson, 81, politician and environmentalist (b. 1940)
  - Junior Siavii, 43, football player (Kansas City Chiefs, Dallas Cowboys, Seattle Seahawks) (b. 1978)
  - Terry Teachout, 65, playwright and critic (The Wall Street Journal) (b. 1956)
  - Len Tillem, 77, attorney and radio broadcaster (KVON, KSRO, KGO) (b. 1944)
  - Sonny Turner, 83, singer (The Platters) (b. 1938)
  - Lynn Yeakel, 80, politician and academic administrator (b. 1941)
- January 14
  - Ann Arensberg, 84, book publishing editor and author (b. 1937)
  - Flo Ayres, 98, radio actress (b. 1923)
  - Dallas Frazier, 82, country musician and songwriter ("There Goes My Everything", "All I Have to Offer You (Is Me)", "Elvira") (b. 1939)
  - Ron Goulart, 89, author and comics historian (b. 1933)
  - Alice von Hildebrand, 98, Belgian-born Roman Catholic philosopher and theologian (b. 1923)
  - Carol Speed, 76, actress (Abby, Disco Godfather, Dynamite Brothers) (b. 1945)
  - Dave Wolverton, 64, writer (The Runelords) (b. 1957)
- January 15
  - Rink Babka, 85, discus thrower, Olympic silver medallist (1960) (b. 1936)
  - Ed Cheff, 78, college baseball coach (Lewis–Clark State College) (b. 1943)
  - Dan Einstein, 61, independent record producer and co-founder of Oh Boy Records (b. 1960)
  - Ralph Emery, 88, Hall of Fame disc jockey and television host (b. 1933)
  - Joe B. Hall, 93, Hall of Fame basketball coach (Kentucky Wildcats) (b. 1928)
  - Paul Carter Harrison, 85, playwright and academic (b. 1936)
  - Michael Jackson, 87, British-American Hall of Fame talk radio host (KABC, KGIL) (b. 1934)
  - Jon Lind, 73, songwriter ("Save the Best for Last", "Crazy for You") and musician (b. 1948)
  - Steve Schapiro, 87, photojournalist (b. 1934)
- January 16
  - Ethan Blackaby, 81, baseball player (b. 1940)
  - Morton J. Blumenthal, 90, politician, member of the Connecticut House of Representatives (1971–1975) (b. 1931)
  - Rocco J. Carzo, 89, football and lacrosse coach (b. 1933)
  - William Daley, 96, ceramist and professor (b. 1925)
  - Brian DeLunas, 46, baseball coach (Seattle Mariners, Missouri Tigers) (b. 1975)
  - Rod Driver, 89, British-born mathematician and politician, member of the Rhode Island House of Representatives (1987–1995, 2009–2011) (b. 1932)
  - Richard J. Ferris, 85, business executive (United Airlines Limited) (b. 1936)
  - John Rice Irwin, 91, cultural historian, founder of the Museum of Appalachia (b. 1930)
  - Charles McGee, 102, fighter pilot (Air Force/Army Air Forces), member of the Tuskegee Airmen, Congressional Gold Medal recipient (b. 1919)
  - Jeremy Sivits, 42, army reservist and convicted war criminal (b. 1979)
  - Gale Wade, 92, baseball player (Chicago Cubs) (b. 1929)
- January 17
  - Jonathan Brown, 82, art historian (b. 1939)
  - Edward Irons, 98, economist (b. 1923)
  - Bill Jackson, 86, television personality (The BJ and Dirty Dragon Show, Gigglesnort Hotel) (b. 1935)
  - Gilbert S. Merritt Jr., 86, judge (b. 1936)
  - Yvette Mimieux, 80, actress (The Time Machine, The Black Hole, Jackson County Jail) (b. 1942)
  - Joseph M. Minard, 90, politician, member of the West Virginia Senate (1990–1994, 2008–2013) (b. 1932)
  - Patricia Kenworthy Nuckols, 100, Hall of Fame field hockey player (national team) and WASP pilot (b. 1921)
  - Ronald G. Tompkins, 70, physician and academic (b. 1951)
- January 18
  - Jonathan Brown, 82, art historian (b. 1939)
  - Hilario Candela, 87, Cuban-born architect (b. 1934)
  - Ron Franklin, 79, sportscaster (ESPN) (b. 1942)
  - Dick Halligan, 78, musician (Blood, Sweat & Tears) and film composer (Go Tell the Spartans, Fear City), Grammy winner (1970) (b. 1943)
  - Lusia Harris, 66, Hall of Fame basketball player (Delta State Lady Statesmen, Houston Angels), Olympic silver medalist (1976) (b. 1955)
  - André Leon Talley, 73, fashion journalist (Vogue) (b. 1948)
- January 19
  - Leland Byrd, 94, basketball player, coach and athletics administrator (West Virginia Mountaineers) (b. 1927)
  - Dan Dworsky, 94, architect (b. 1927)
  - Bob Goalby, 92, professional golfer, Masters winner (1968) (b. 1929)
  - Gloria McMillan, 88, actress (Our Miss Brooks) (b. 1933)
  - Jamye Coleman Williams, 103, activist (b. 1918)
- January 20
  - Fanita English, 105, Romanian-born psychoanalyst (b. 1916)
  - Athan Catjakis, 90, politician (b. 1931)
  - Meat Loaf, 74, singer ("Two Out of Three Ain't Bad", "I'd Do Anything for Love (But I Won't Do That)") and actor (The Rocky Horror Picture Show, Fight Club) (b. 1947)
  - Popcorn Deelites, 24, racehorse and animal actor (Seabiscuit) (b. 1998)
  - Earl Swensson, 91, architect (AT&T Building, Gaylord Opryland Resort & Convention Center) (b. 1930)
- January 21
  - Louie Anderson, 68, comedian, actor (Baskets, Life With Louie), and game show host (Family Feud), Emmy winner (2015) (b. 1953)
  - Rex Cawley, 81, Olympic hurdler (b. 1940)
  - James Forbes, 69, basketball player, Olympic silver medallist (1972) (b. 1952)
  - Arnie Kantrowitz, 81, LGBT activist and author (b. 1940)
  - Arlo U. Landolt, 86, astronomer (b. 1935)
  - Mace Neufeld, 93, film producer (The Hunt for Red October, Invictus, The Equalizer) (b. 1928)
  - Karl Harrington Potter, 94, Indologist (b. 1927) (death announced on this date)
  - Dennis Smith, 81, writer and firefighter (b. 1940)
  - Arthur Tarnow, 79, jurist, judge of the U.S. District Court for Eastern Michigan (since 1998) (b. 1942)
  - Terry Tolkin, 62, music journalist and music executive (Elektra Records, Touch and Go Records, No.6 Records) (b. 1959)
- January 22
  - Johan Hultin, 97, Swedish-born pathologist (b. 1924).
  - Kathryn Kates, 73, actress (The Many Saints of Newark, Law & Order: Special Victims Unit, Shades of Blue) (b. 1948)
  - Ralph Natale, 86, mobster (Philadelphia crime family) (b. 1935)
  - Bill Owens, 84, politician, member of the Massachusetts Senate (1975–1982, 1989–1992) (b. 1937)
  - Alon Wieland, 86, politician, member of the North Dakota House of Representatives (2003–2014) (b. 1935)
  - Joe Yukica, 90, college football player and coach (Dartmouth Big Green, Boston College Eagles, New Hampshire Wildcats) (b. 1931)
- January 23
  - Beegie Adair, 84, jazz pianist (b. 1937)
  - Edgar S. Cahn, 86, law professor, counsel and speech writer to Robert F. Kennedy, and creator of TimeBanking (b. 1935)
  - Trude Feldman, 97, journalist (The New York Times, The Washington Post), member of the White House Press Corps (b. 1924)
- January 24
  - John Arrillaga, 84, real estate developer and philanthropist (b. 1937)
  - Ron Esau, 67, racing driver (b. 1954)
  - Sheldon Silver, 77, politician, member (1977–2015) and speaker (1994–2015) of the New York State Assembly (b. 1944)
- January 25
  - Judd Bernard, 94, film producer and screenwriter (b. 1927)
  - David G. Mugar, 82, businessman and philanthropist (b. 1939)
  - Peter Robbins, 65, actor (Peanuts, Blondie) (b. 1956) (death announced on this date)
  - Esteban Edward Torres, 91, politician, member of the U.S. House of Representatives (1983–1999) (b. 1930)
- January 26
  - David Bannett, 100, American-Israeli electronics engineer, inventor of the Shabbat elevator (b. 1921)
  - Bud Brown, 94, politician, Acting Secretary of Commerce (1987), member of the U.S. House of Representatives (1965–1983) (b. 1927)
  - Moses J. Moseley, 31, actor (b. 1990)
  - Thomas M. Neuville, 71, politician, member of the Minnesota Senate (1990–2008) (b. 1950)
  - Jeremiah Stamler, 102, cardiovascular epidemiologist (b. 1919)
  - Morgan Stevens, 70, actor (Fame, A Year in the Life, Melrose Place) (b. 1951) (body discovered on this date)
  - Tim Van Galder, 77, football player (St. Louis Cardinals) and broadcaster (b. 1944)
- January 27
  - Gene Clines, 75, baseball player (Pittsburgh Pirates, Chicago Cubs, Texas Rangers), World Series champion (1971) (b. 1946)
  - Martin Leach-Cross Feldman, 87, jurist, judge of the U.S. District Court for the Eastern District of Louisiana (since 1983) (b. 1934)
  - Gary K. Hart, 78, politician, member of the California State Assembly (1974–1982) and Senate (1982–1994) (b. 1943)
  - Matthew Reeves, 44, convicted murderer (b. 1977)
- January 28
  - Richard Christiansen, 90, theatre and film critic (The Chicago Tribune) (b. 1931)
  - Richard L. Duchossois, 100, Hall of Fame racetrack (Arlington Park, Churchill Downs) and racehorse owner (b. 1921)
  - Donald May, 94, actor (Colt .45, The Edge of Night, Texas) (b. 1927)
  - Wayne Stenehjem, 68, politician, member of the North Dakota House of Representatives (1976–1979) and Senate (1980–2000), and attorney general (since 2000) (b. 1953)
  - John Tuttle, 70, politician, member of the Maine Senate (1984–1988, 2012–2014) and four-time member of the House of Representatives (b. 1951)
- January 29
  - Tony Barrand, 76, British-born folk singer and academic (b. 1945)
  - Barbara A. Curran, 81, politician and judge, member of the New Jersey General Assembly (1974–1980), judge of the New Jersey Superior Court (1992–2000) (b. 1940)
  - Marty Engel, 90, Olympic hammer thrower (b. 1932)
  - David Green, 61, Nicaraguan-born baseball player (b. 1960)
  - Howard Hesseman, 81, actor (WKRP in Cincinnati, This Is Spinal Tap, Head of the Class) (b. 1940)
  - Sam Lay, 86, drummer and vocalist (b. 1935)
  - Les Shapiro, 65, sports broadcaster (CBS Sports, ESPN) (b. 1956)
  - John K. Singlaub, 100, military officer, co-founder of Western Goals Foundation (b. 1921)
- January 30
  - Jon Appleton, 83, composer, an educator and a pioneer in electro-acoustic music (b. 1939)
  - Art Cooley, 87, biology teacher, naturalist and expedition leader, and co-founder of EDF (b. 1934)
  - Jeff Innis, 59, baseball player (New York Mets) (b. 1962)
  - Cheslie Kryst, 30, television presenter (Extra) and beauty queen (Miss USA 2019) (b. 1991)
  - Hargus "Pig" Robbins, 84, Hall of Fame country pianist (b. 1938)
- January 31
  - James Bidgood, 88, filmmaker, photographer, and visual and performance artist (b. 1933)
  - Carleton Carpenter, 95, actor (Two Weeks with Love, Three Little Words, Summer Stock) (b. 1926)
  - Nancy Ezer, 74, Israeli-born scholar, critic of Hebrew literature, author, and Senior Lecturer in Hebrew (b. 1947)
  - Jimmy Johnson, 93, blues guitarist and singer (b. 1928)
  - Thomas A. Pankok, 90, politician, member of the New Jersey General Assembly (1982–1986) (b. 1931)

== February ==
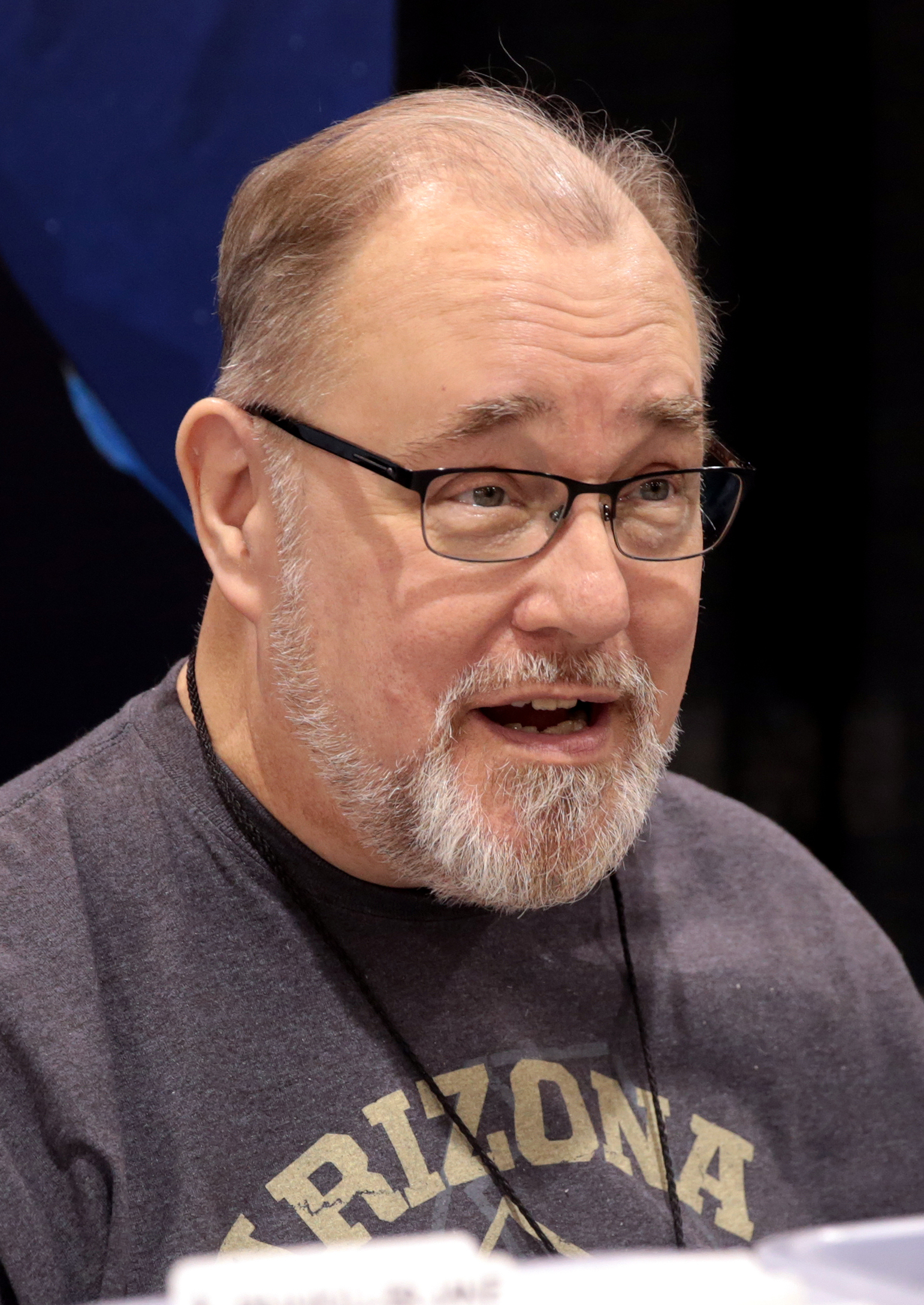
Brian Augustyn

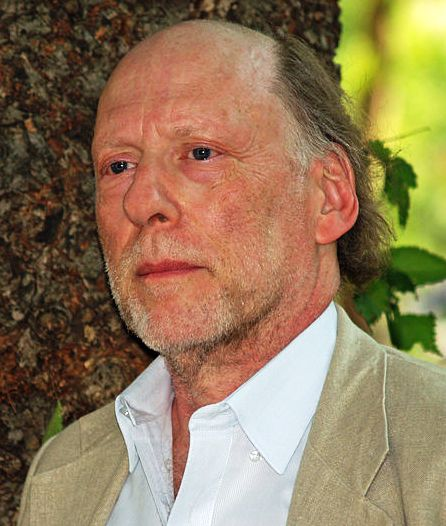
Todd Gitlin

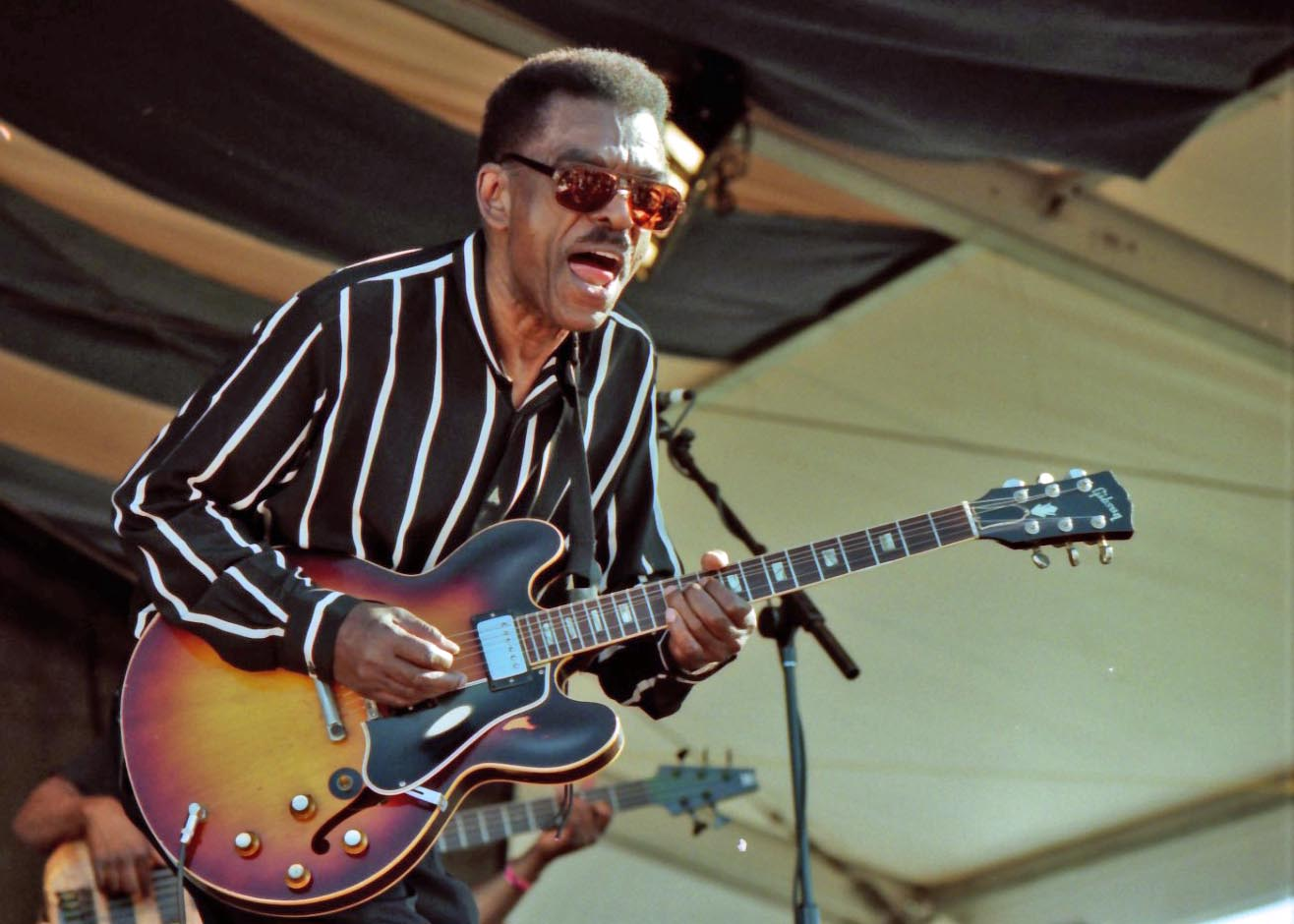
Syl Johnson

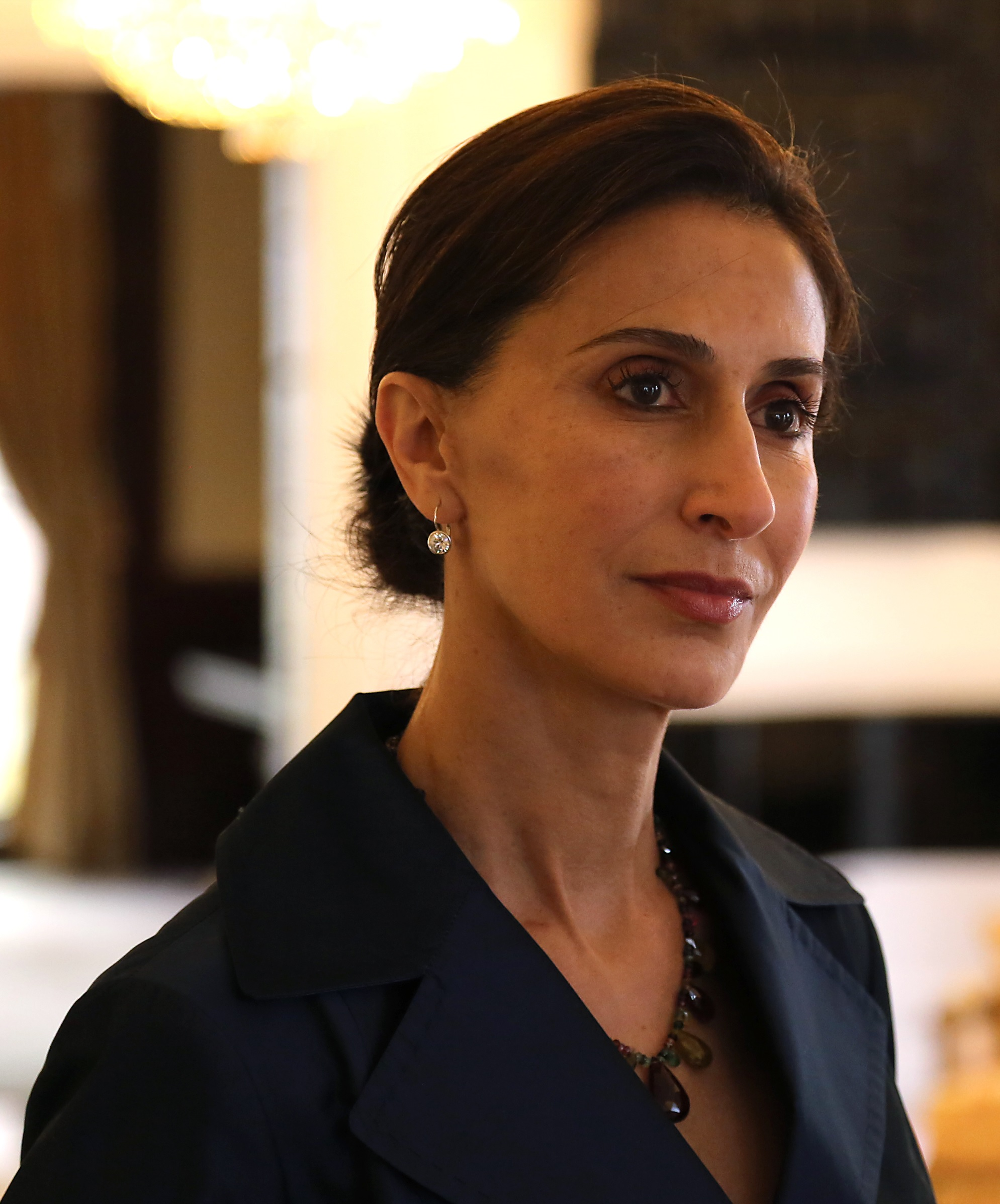
Azita Raji

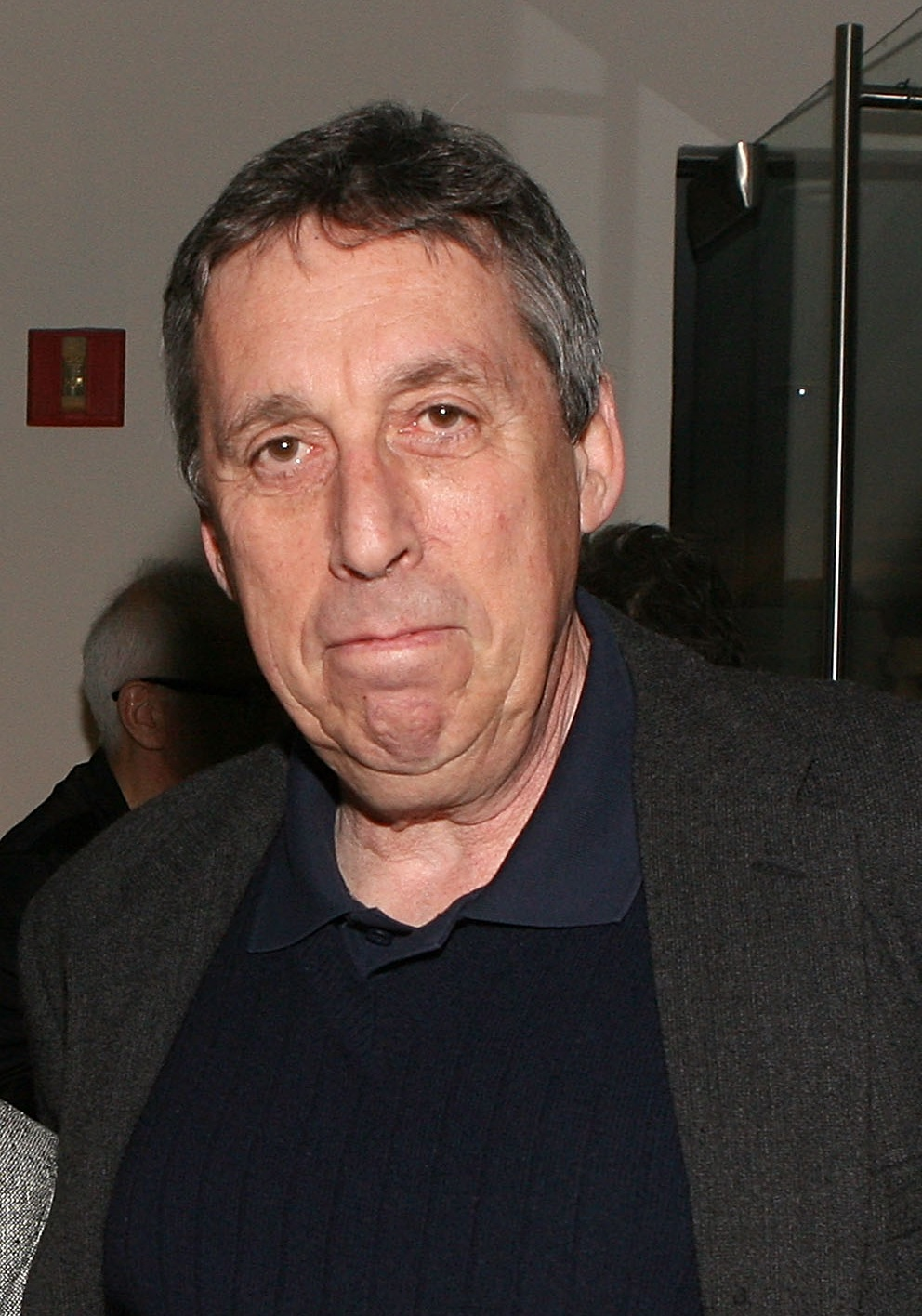
Ivan Reitman

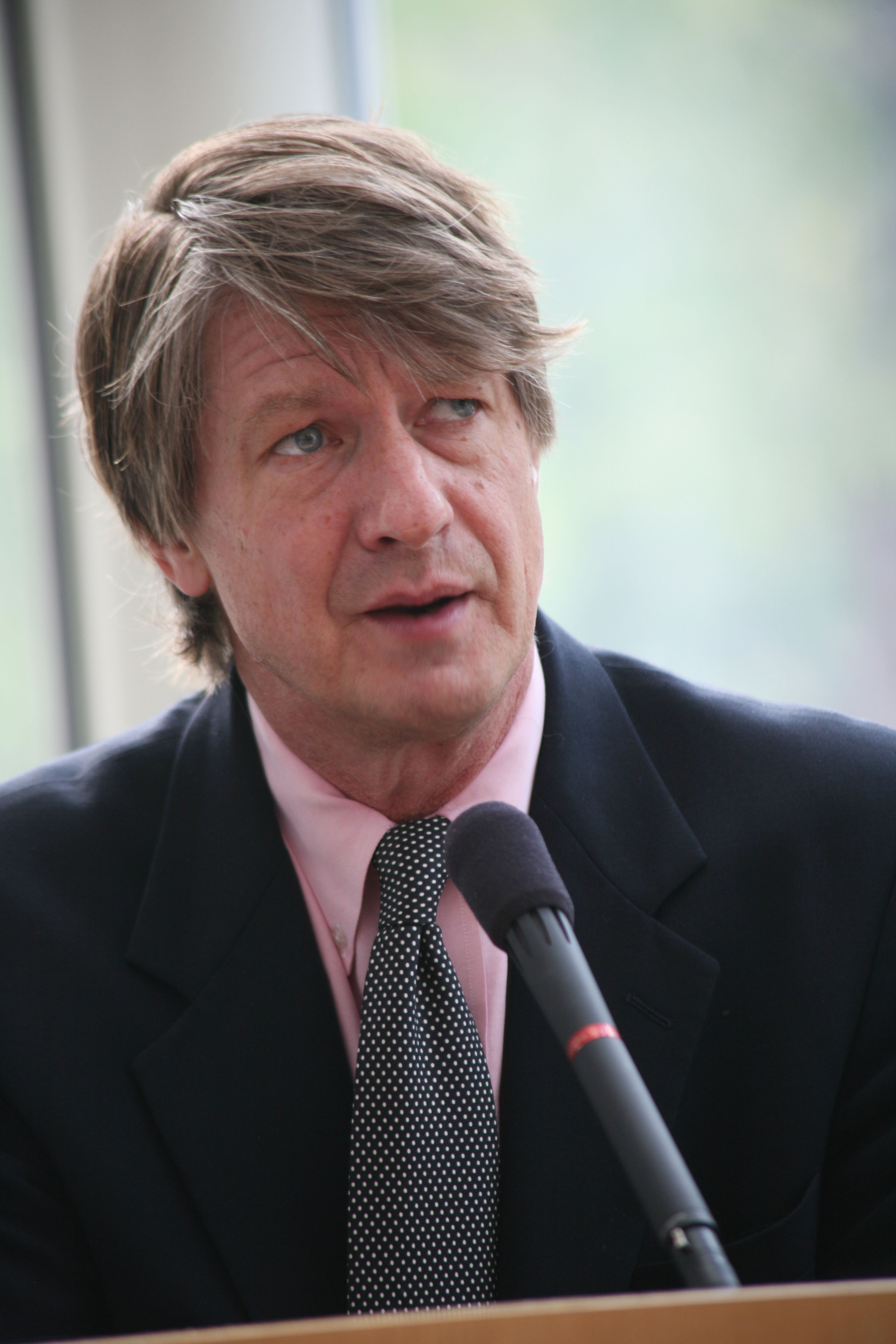
P. J. O'Rourke

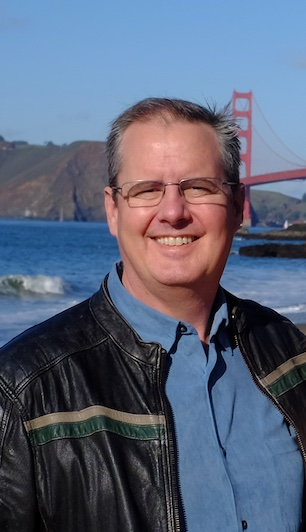
Declan O'Brien

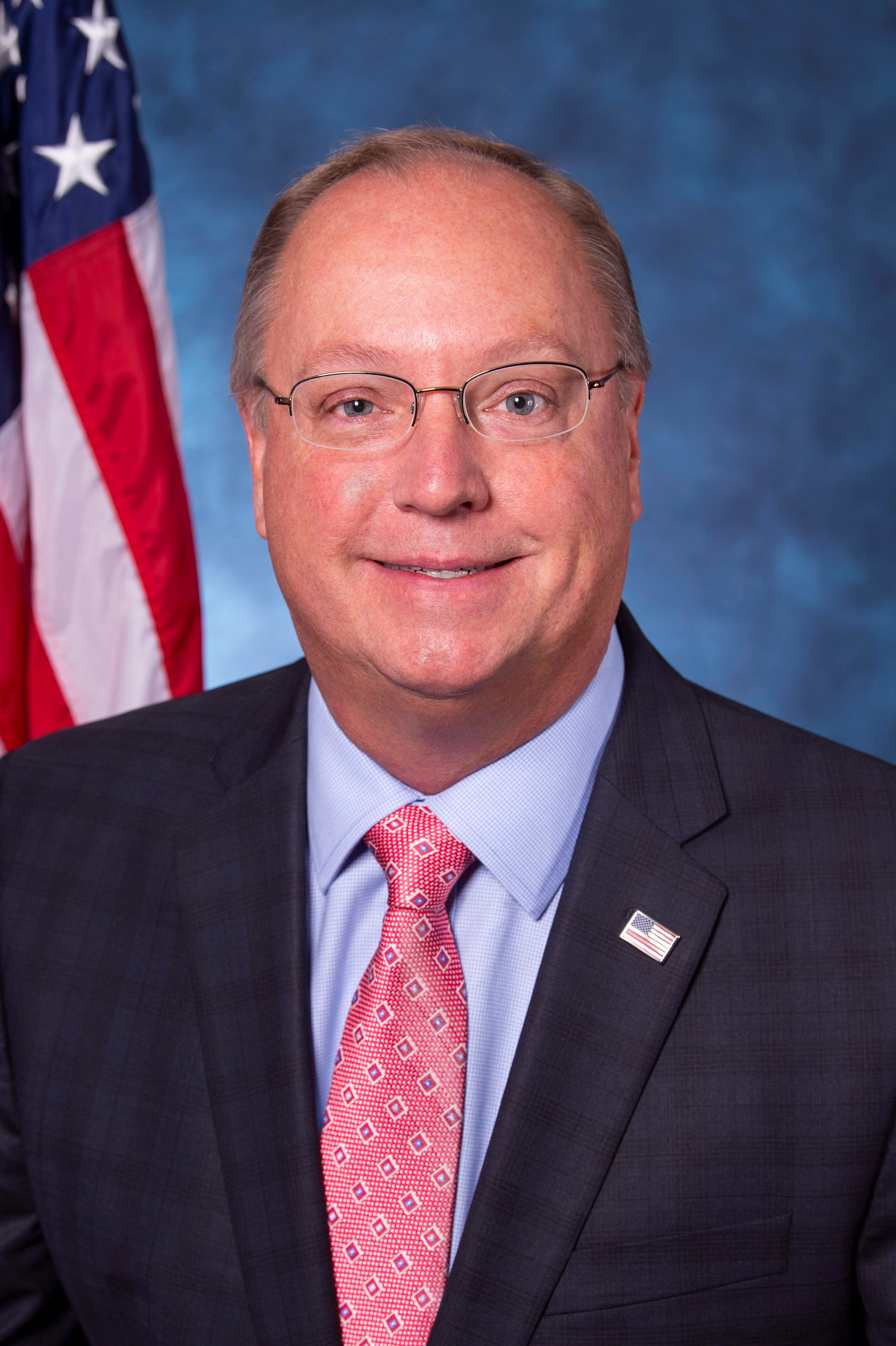
Jim Hagedorn

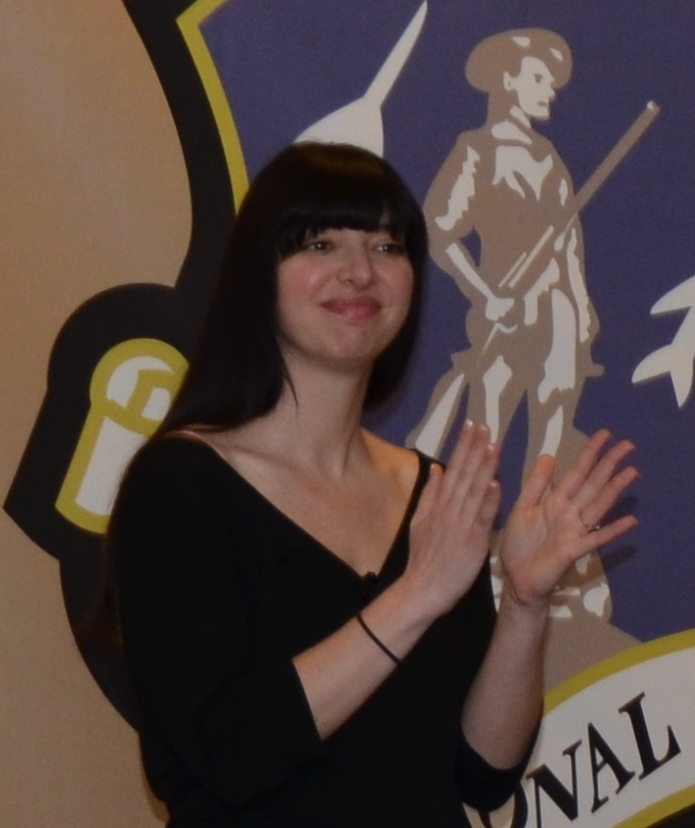
Lindsey Pearlman

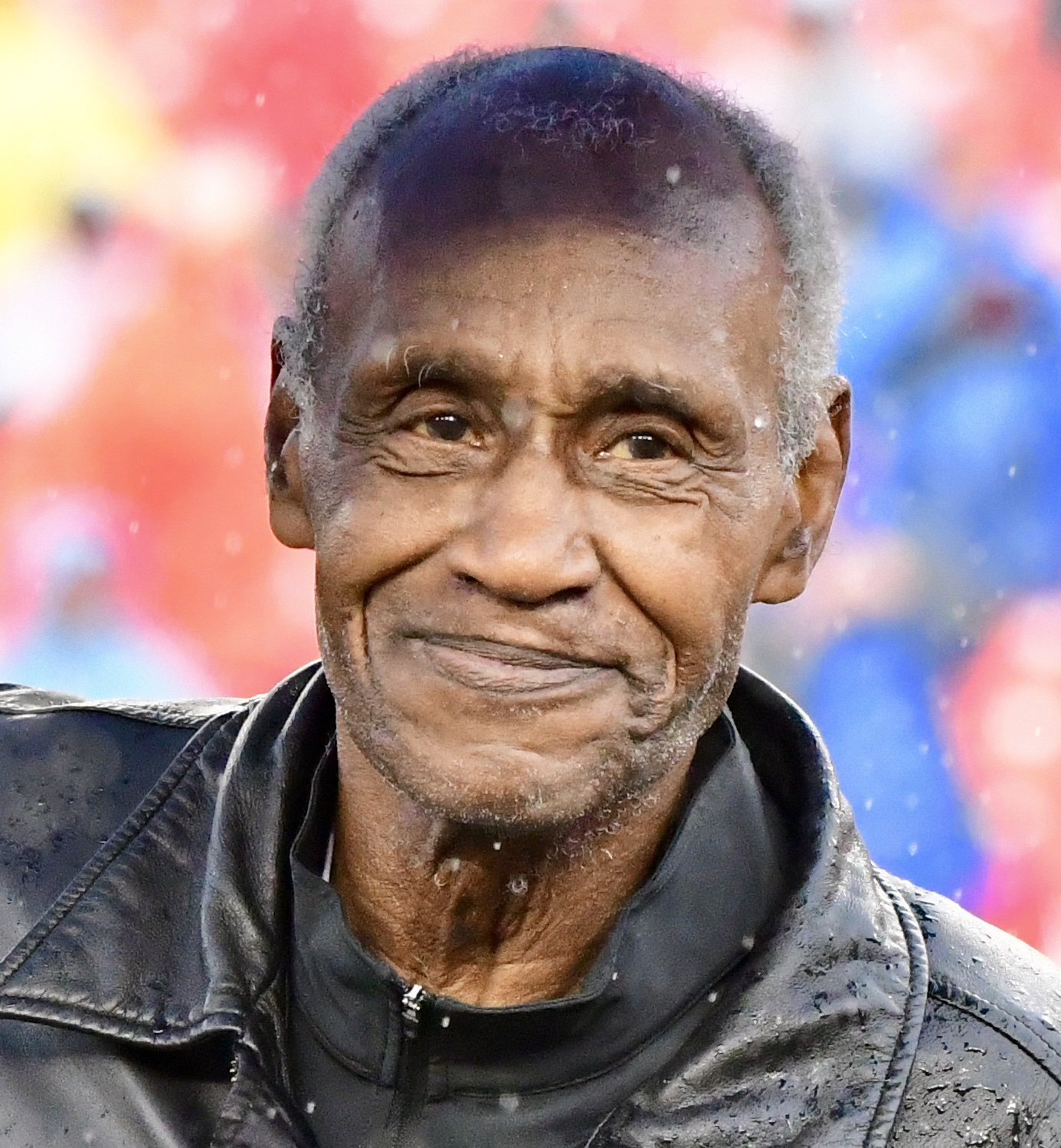
Charley Taylor

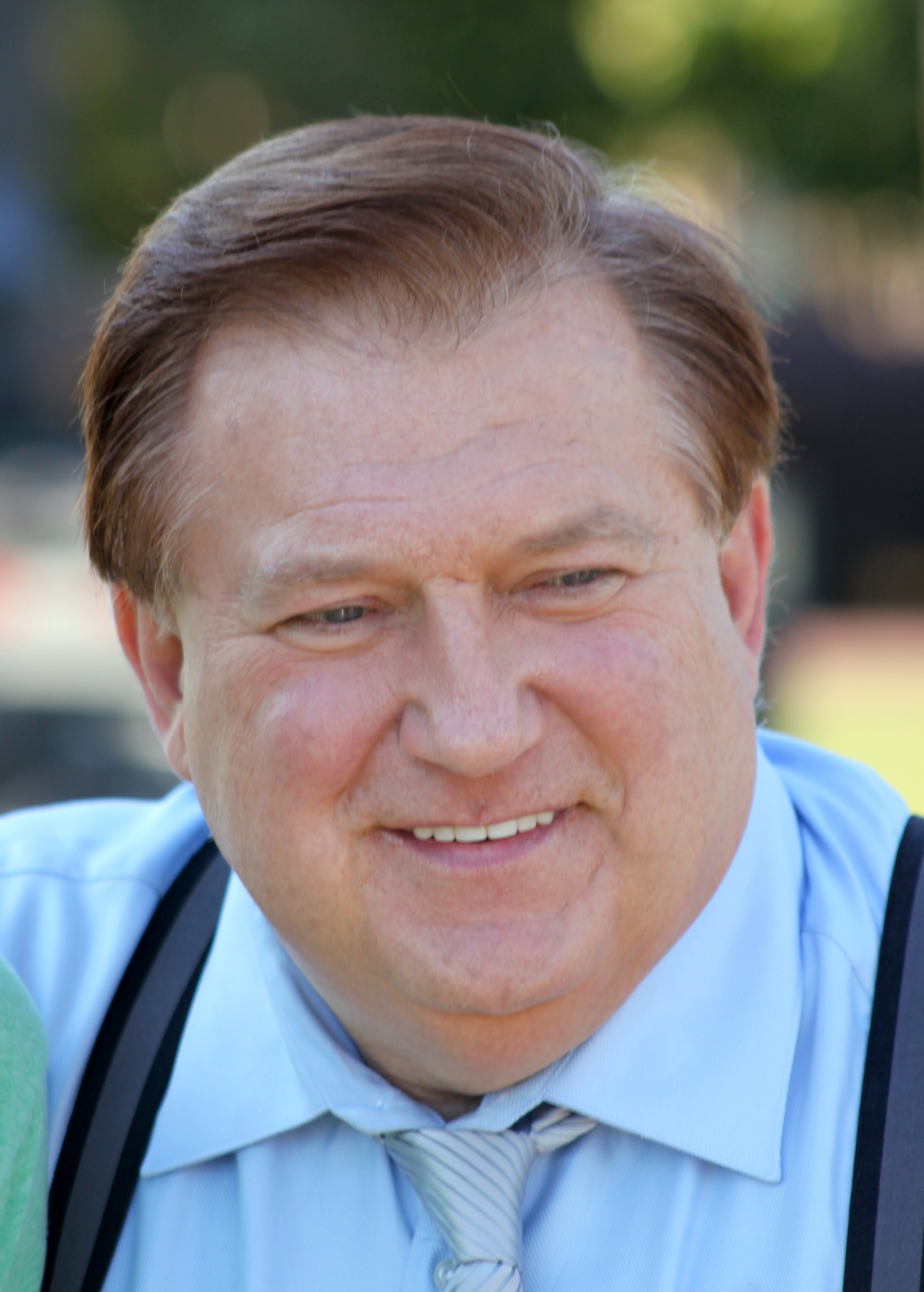
Bob Beckel

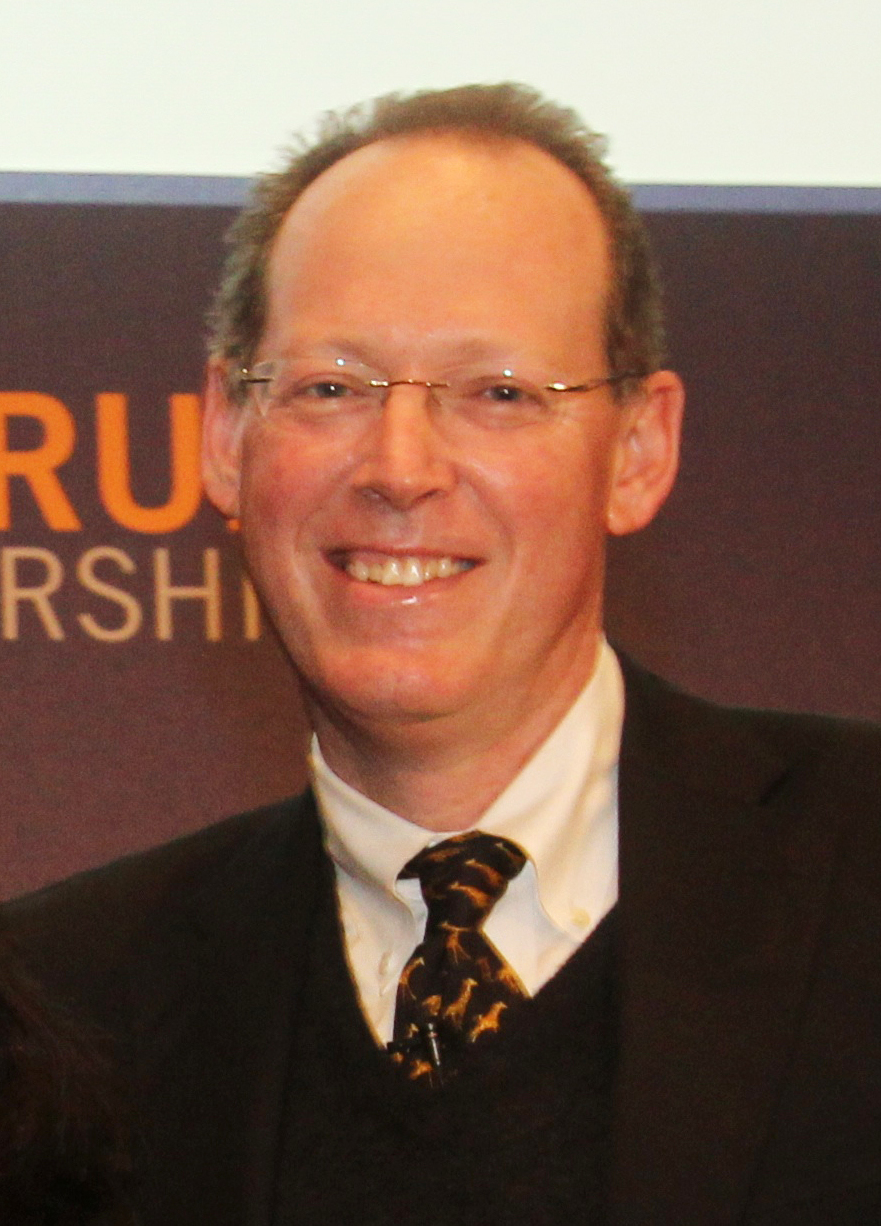
Paul Farmer

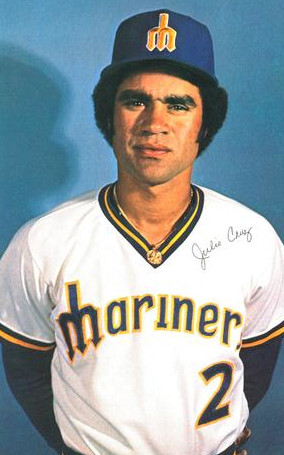
Julio Cruz

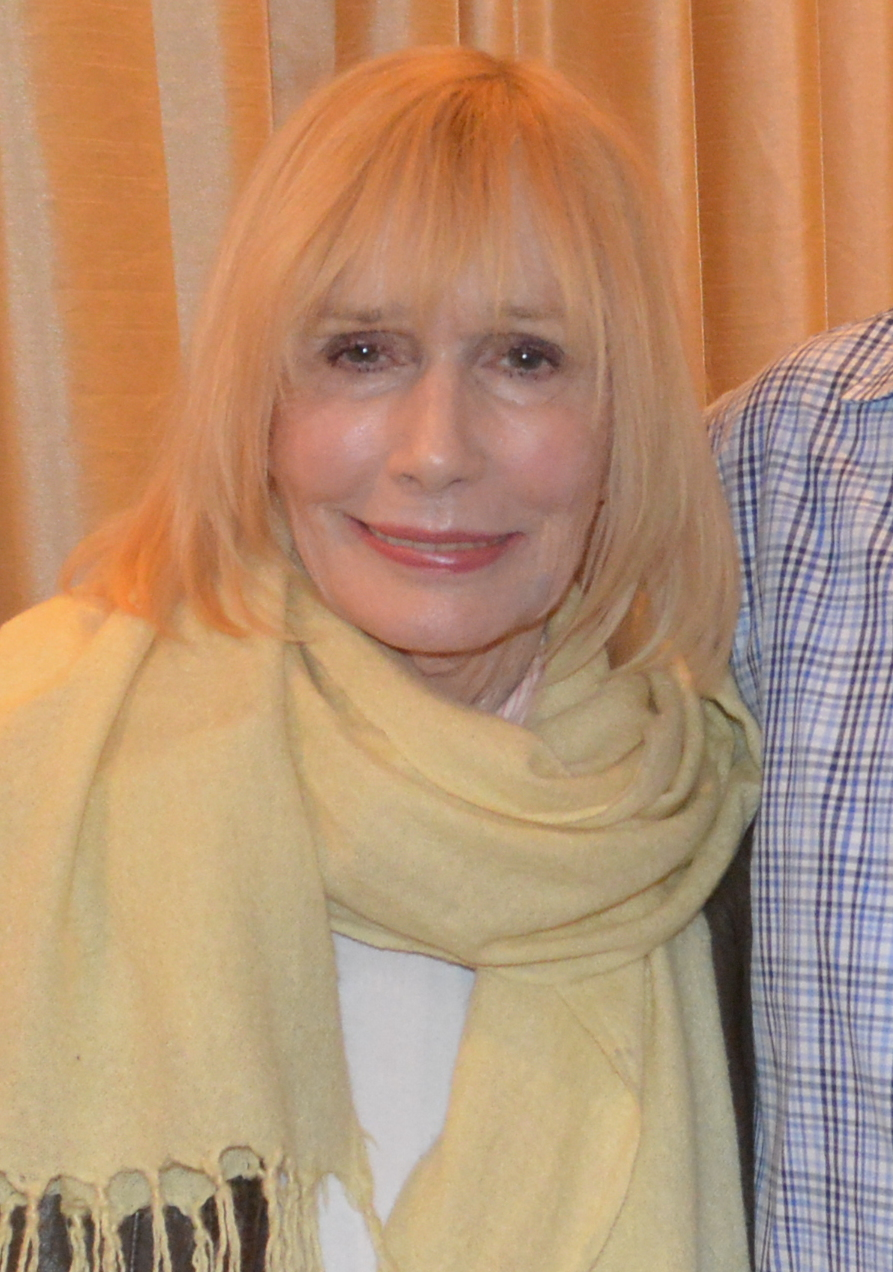
Sally Kellerman

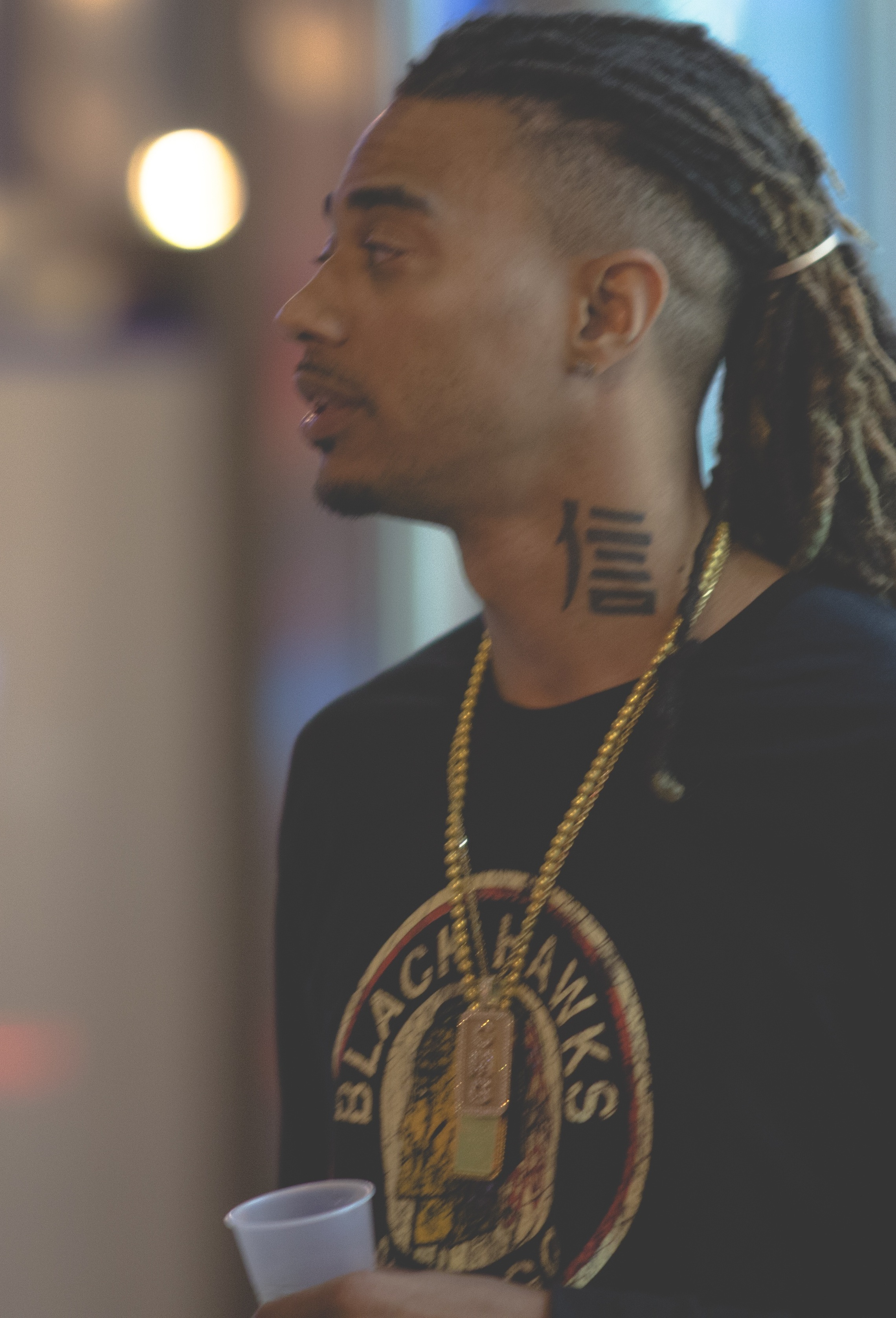
Snootie Wild

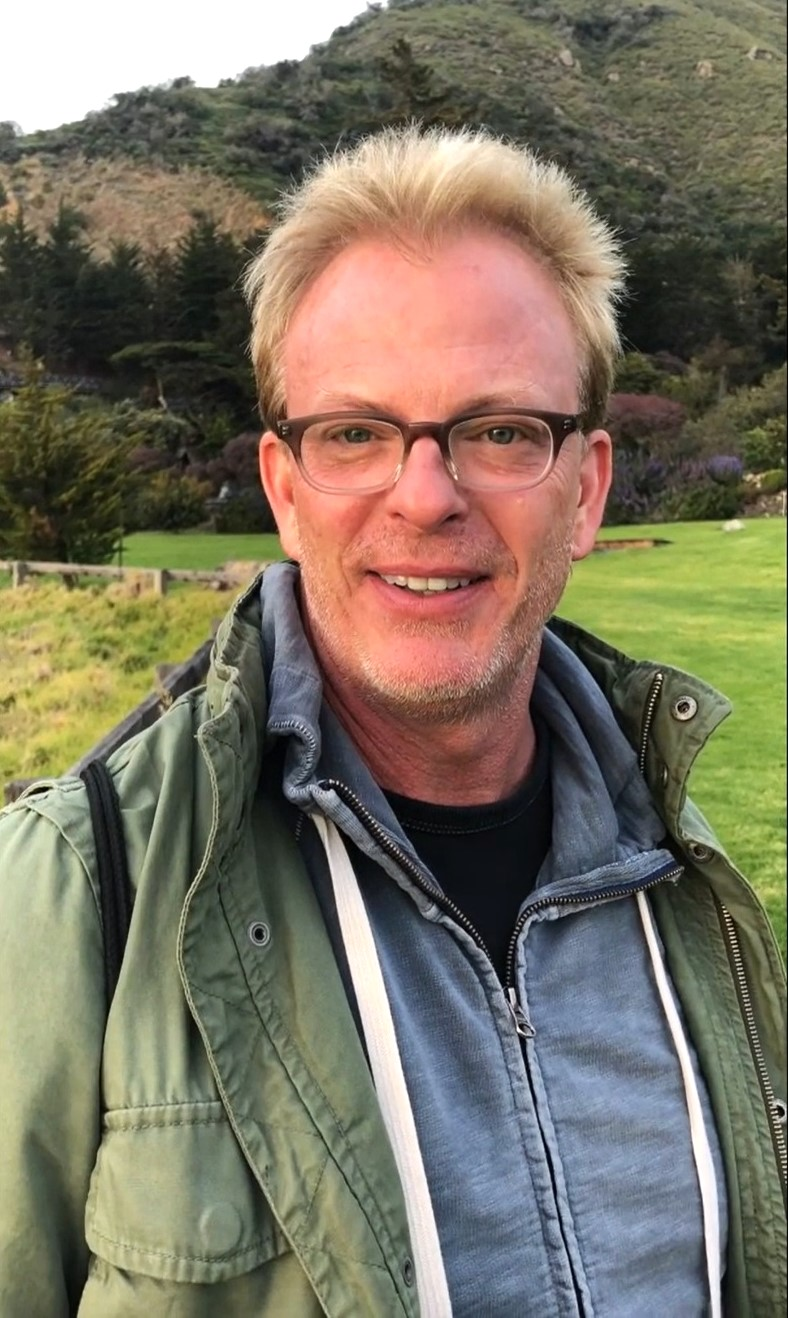
Kirk Baily

- February 1
  - Brian Augustyn, 67, comic book editor and writer (The Flash, Gotham by Gaslight, Imperial Guard) (b. 1954)
  - Bud Clark, 90, politician, mayor of Portland, Oregon (1985–1992) (b. 1931)
  - Paul Danahy, 93, politician and judge, member of the Florida House of Representatives (1967–1974) (b. 1928)
  - Robin Herman, 70, writer and journalist (The New York Times) (b. 1951)
  - Leslie Parnas, 90, cellist (b. 1931)
  - Harriet S. Shapiro, 93, lawyer (b. 1928)
  - Larry Warner, 76, politician, member of the Texas House of Representatives (1987–1991) (b. 1945)
  - Jon Zazula, 69, record label executive and founder of Megaforce Records (b. 1952)
- February 2
  - Robert Blalack, 73, Panamanian-born visual effects artist (Star Wars, RoboCop, The Day After), Oscar winner (1978) (b. 1948)
  - Frank Bradford, 80, politician, member of the Georgia House of Representatives (1997–1999) (b. 1941)
  - Joe Diorio, 85, jazz guitarist (b. 1936)
  - Arthur Feuerstein, 86, chess grandmaster (b. 1935)
  - Bill Fitch, 89, Hall of Fame basketball coach (Cleveland Cavaliers, Boston Celtics, Houston Rockets), NBA champion (1981) (b. 1932)
  - Ed Foreman, 88, politician, member of the U.S. House of Representatives (1963–1965, 1969–1971) (b. 1933)
  - Willie Leacox, 74, drummer (America) (b. 1947)
  - Ralph Presley, 91, politician, member of the Georgia House of Representatives (1992–1993) (b. 1930)
  - Gloria Rojas, 82, television journalist (Eyewitness News, Like It Is) (b. 1939)
  - Paul Willen, 93, architect (b. 1928)
- February 3
  - Mickey Bass, 78, bassist, composer, arranger, and music educator (b. 1943)
  - Herbert Benson, 86, medical doctor and cardiologist (b. 1935)
  - Manuel Bromberg, 104, artist, Guggenheim Fellow, World War II veteran, and professor emeritus of Art, at the State University of New York at New Paltz (b. 1917)
  - Harry Carmean, 99, artist (b. 1922)
  - Lani Forbes, 34, author (b. 1987)
  - Douglas Goldhamer, 76, rabbi, founder of the Hebrew Seminary (b. 1945)
  - Anthony J. Mercorella, 94, politician, member of the New York State Assembly (1966–1972) and New York City Council (1973–1975) (b. 1927)
  - Martin B. Moore, 84, politician, member of the Alaska House of Representatives (1971–1972) (b. 1937)
  - Mike Moore, 80, baseball executive, president of the National Association of Professional Baseball Leagues (1991–2007) (b. 1941)
  - John Sanders, 76, baseball player (Kansas City Athletics) and coach (Nebraska Cornhuskers) (b. 1945)
- February 4
  - Nancy Berg, 90, model and actress, (b. 1931)
  - Ashley Bryan, 98, children's author and illustrator (Freedom Over Me) (b. 1923)
  - Leland Christensen, 62, politician, member of the Wyoming Senate (2011–2019) (b. 1959)
  - Avern Cohn, 97, jurist, judge of the U.S. District Court for Eastern Michigan (since 1979) (b. 1924)
  - Jason Epstein, 93, editor and publisher (b. 1928)
  - Kyle Mullen, 24, football player (Yale) and SEAL candidate (b. 1997–1998)
  - Paul Overgaard, 91, politician, member of the Minnesota House of Representatives (1963–1969) and Senate (1971–1973) (b. 1930)
  - Robert Owens, 75, politician, member of the Massachusetts House of Representatives (1973–1975) (b. 1946)
  - Julie Saul, 67, art gallerist (b. 1954)
- February 5
  - Santonio Beard, 41, football player (Alabama Crimson Tide) (b. 1980)
  - Kenneth H. Brown, 85, playwright and novelist (b. 1936)
  - Oscar Chaplin III, 41, Olympic weightlifter (b. 1980)
  - David Fuller, 80, politician, member of the Montana Senate (1983–1987) (b. 1941)
  - Todd Gitlin, 79, sociologist and author (b. 1943)
  - Raymond A. Jordan, 78, politician, member of the Massachusetts House of Representatives (1975–1994) (b. 1943)
  - Anne R. Kenney, 72, archivist (b. 1950)
  - Ananda Prasad, 94, Indian-born biochemist (b. 1928)
  - Tom Prince, 52, professional bodybuilder (b. 1969)
- February 6
  - Haven J. Barlow, 100, politician, member of the Utah House of Representatives (1952–1955) and senate (1955–1994) (b. 1922)
  - Sigal G. Barsade, 56, Israeli-born business theorist and researcher (b. 1965)
  - Jerome Chazen, 94, businessman and philanthropist (b. 1927)
  - George Crumb, 92, composer (Ancient Voices of Children, Black Angels, Makrokosmos), Pulitzer Prize (1968) and Grammy winner (2001) (b. 1929)
  - Charles B. Deane Jr., 84, politician, member of the North Carolina Senate (b. 1937)
  - Syl Johnson, 85, blues singer (b. 1936)
  - Eleanor Owen, 101, journalist and mental health professional (b. 1921)
  - Frank Pesce, 75, actor (Midnight Run, Beverly Hills Cop II, Maniac Cop), complications from dementia (b. 1946)
  - John Vinocur, 81, journalist and editor (The New York Times, International Herald Tribune) (b. 1940)
- February 7
  - William H. Folwell, 97, Episcopal prelate, bishop of Central Florida (1970–1989) (b. 1924)
  - Dan Lacey, 61, painter (b. 1960)
  - Robert Mulcahy, 89, college athletics administrator (Rutgers University) (b. 1932)
  - Douglas Trumbull, 79, special effects supervisor (2001: A Space Odyssey, Blade Runner) and film director (Silent Running) (b. 1942)
- February 8
  - Mark H. Collier, religious scholar and academic administrator, president of Baldwin–Wallace College (1999–2006) (c. 1942)
  - George Spiro Dibie, 90, television cinematographer (Night Court, Growing Pains) (b. 1931)
  - Bill Lienhard, 92, basketball player, Olympic champion (1952) (b. 1930)
  - Azita Raji, 60, Iranian-born diplomat, banker, and philanthropist, ambassador to Sweden (2016–2017) (b. 1961) (death announced on this date)
  - David Rudman, 78, Russian-American sambo wrestler (b. 1943)
  - Gerald Williams, 55, baseball player (New York Yankees, Atlanta Braves, Tampa Bay Devil Rays, Milwaukee Brewers, Florida Marlins, New York Mets) (b. 1966)
- February 9
  - Rudy Abbott, 81, baseball coach (Jacksonville State Gamecocks) (b. 1940)
  - Jim Angle, 75, journalist and television reporter for Fox News (b. 1946)
  - Olivia Cajero Bedford, 83, politician, member of the Arizona House of Representatives (2003–2011) and Senate (2011–2019) (b. 1938)
  - Betty Davis, 77, funk and soul singer (b. 1944)
  - Candi Devine, 63, professional wrestler (AWA) (b. 1959)
  - Johnny Ellis, 61, politician, member of the Alaska House of Representatives (1987–1993) and Senate (1993–2017) (b. 1960)
  - Jeremy Giambi, 47, baseball player (Kansas City Royals, Oakland Athletics, Philadelphia Phillies, Boston Red Sox) (b. 1974)
  - Javier Gonzales, 55, politician, mayor of Santa Fe (2014–2018) (b. 1946)
- February 10
  - Herb Bergson, 65, politician mayor of Duluth (2004–2008) (b. 1956)
  - Dale Doig, 86, politician, mayor of Fresno, California (1985–1989) (b. 1935)
  - Bruce Duffy, 70, author (b. 1951)
  - Duvall Hecht, 91, Olympic rower and publisher (b. 1930)
  - Waverly Person, 95, seismologist (b. 1926)
  - Craig Stowers, 67, jurist, associate justice (2009–2020) and chief justice (2015–2018) of the Alaska Supreme Court (b. 1954)
  - John Wesley, 93, painter (b. 1928)
- February 12
  - William G. Batchelder, 79, politician, member (1969–1998, 2007–2014) and speaker (2011–2014) of the Ohio House of Representatives (b. 1942)
  - Frank Beckmann, 72, German-born radio host (WJR) and sportscaster (Michigan Sports Network) (b. 1949)
  - Valerie Boyd, 58, writer and academic (b. 1963)
  - Alexander Brody, 89, Hungarian-American businessman, author, and marketing executive (b. 1933)
  - Bob DeMeo, 66, jazz drummer (b. 1955)
  - Howard Grimes, 80, drummer (Hi Rhythm Section) (b. 1941)
  - Robert M. Hayes, 95, professor emeritus and dean of the Graduate School of Library and Information Science (b. 1926)
  - Carmen Herrera, 106, Cuban-born artist (b. 1915)
  - Calvin Jones, 58, baseball player (Seattle Mariners) (b. 1963)
  - William Kraft, 98, composer and conductor (b. 1923)
  - Ivan Reitman, 75, Czechoslovak-born Canadian film director and producer (Ghostbusters, Meatballs, Kindergarten Cop), founder and owner of The Montecito Picture Company (b. 1946)
  - Aurelio de la Vega, 96, Cuban-American composer and educator (b. 1925)
- February 13
  - King Louie Bankston, 49, rock musician (The Exploding Hearts) (b. 1972)
  - John Keston, 97, British-born stage actor and runner (b. 1924)
- February 14
  - Harold V. Camp, 86, politician, member of the Connecticut House of Representatives (1968–1974) (b. 1935)
  - Alan J. Greiman, 90, politician and jurist, member of the Illinois House of Representatives (1972–1987) (b. 1931)
  - Mickie Henson, 59, professional wrestling referee (WCW, WWE) (b. 1962)
  - Sandy Nelson, 83, drummer ("Teen Beat", "Let There Be Drums") (b. 1938)
  - Robert E. Rose, 82, justice and politician, lieutenant governor of Nevada (1975–1979) (b. 1939)
  - Alfred Sole, 78, film director (Alice, Sweet Alice, Pandemonium) and production designer (Veronica Mars) (b. 1943)
- February 15
  - Bill Dando, 89, football player and coach (b. 1932)
  - P. J. O'Rourke, 74, humorist (National Lampoon), journalist, and author (Parliament of Whores, Give War a Chance) (b. 1947)
  - Bill Robinson, 96, automobile designer (Chrysler) (b. 1925)
  - Woodrow Stanley, 71, politician, mayor of Flint, Michigan (1991–2002), member of the Michigan House of Representatives (2009–2014) (b. 1950)
- February 16
  - R. Wayne Baughman, 81, Olympic wrestler (1964, 1968, 1972) (b. 1941)
  - Walter Dellinger, 80, lawyer and academic, acting solicitor general (1996–1997) (b. 1941)
  - Gail Halvorsen, 101, pilot (Operation Little Vittles) (b. 1920)
  - Declan O'Brien, 56, film and television writer and director (Sharktopus, Wrong Turn 4: Bloody Beginnings, Joy Ride 3: Roadkill) (b. 1965)
- February 17
  - Jack Bendat, 96, American-born Australian businessman and owner of the Perth Wildcats (b. 1925)
  - David Brenner, 59, film editor (Born on the Fourth of July, Man of Steel, Independence Day), Oscar winner (1990) (b. 1962)
  - Pasquale DeBaise, 95, businessman and politician, member of the Connecticut House of Representatives (1967–1973) (b. 1926)
  - Jim Hagedorn, 59, politician, member of the U.S. House of Representatives (since 2019) (b. 1962)
  - Roddie Haley, 57, sprinter (b. 1964)
  - Charlie Milstead, 84, football player (Houston Oilers) (b. 1937)
  - Gilbert Postelle, 35, convicted murderer (b. 1986)
  - Martin Tolchin, 93, journalist (The New York Times) and author, co-founder of The Hill and Politico (b. 1928)
  - David Tyson, 62, R&B singer (The Manhattans) (b. 1959)
  - Clarence Williams, 47, football player (Florida State Seminoles, Buffalo Bills) (b. 1975)
- February 18
  - Brad Johnson, 62, actor (Always, Soldier of Fortune, Inc.) and model (Marlboro Man) (b. 1959)
  - Leo Fong, 93, Chinese-American actor (Enforcer from Death Row, The Last Reunion), film director (Fight to Win), and martial artist (b. 1928)
  - Lindsey Pearlman, 43, actress (General Hospital, Chicago Justice) (b. 1978)
  - Tom Veitch, 80, comic book writer (The Light and Darkness War, Animal Man, Star Wars) and novelist (b. 1941)
- February 19
  - David Boggs, 71, electrical and radio engineer and co-inventor of Ethernet (b. 1950)
  - David Bradley, 69, politician, member of the Arizona Senate (2013–2021) and House of Representatives (2003–2011) (b. 1952)
  - Bert Coan, 81, football player (b. 1940)
  - Roy W. Gould, 94, electrical engineer and physicist who specialized in plasma physics (b. 1927)
  - Dan Graham, 79, artist (b. 1942)
  - Adlene Harrison, 98, politician, mayor of Dallas (1976) (b. 1923)
  - Maggy Hurchalla, 81, environmental activist (b. 1940)
  - Nightbirde, 31, singer-songwriter (b. 1990)
  - Charley Taylor, 80, Hall of Fame football player (Washington Redskins) and coach (b. 1941)
- February 20
  - Bob Beckel, 73, political analyst and pundit (Fox News, CNN, USA Today) (b. 1948)
  - Leo Bersani, 90, literary theorist (b. 1931)
  - Merle Kodo Boyd, 77, Zen Buddhist nun (b. 1944)
  - Sam Henry, 65, drummer (Wipers) (b. 1956)
  - Joni James, 91, singer ("Why Don't You Believe Me?") (b. 1930)
  - Henry Tippie, 95, businessman (b. 1926)
  - DeWain Valentine, 86, minimalist sculptor (b. 1935)
- February 21
  - Ernie Andrews, 94, jazz singer (b. 1927)
  - Paul Farmer, 62, medical anthropologist (b. 1959)
  - Shad Thyrion, 24, murder victim (b. 1997)
- February 22
  - The Amazing Johnathan, 63, magician and stand-up comedian (b. 1958)
  - Julio Cruz, 67, baseball player (Seattle Mariners, Chicago White Sox) (b. 1954)
  - Mark Lanegan, 57, musician (Screaming Trees, The Gutter Twins, Queens of the Stone Age) and singer-songwriter ("Nearly Lost You") (b. 1964)
  - Judith Pipher, 81, Canadian-born astrophysicist, director of the Mees Observatory (1979–1994) (b. 1940)
- February 23
  - Sheila Benson, 91, journalist and film critic (Los Angeles Times, Pacific Sun) (b. 1930)
  - Don Grist, 83, politician and jurist, member of the Mississippi House of Representatives (1976–1990) (b. 1938)
  - Edmund Keeley, 94, Syrian-born novelist and poet (b. 1928)
  - George Kinley, 84, politician, member of the Iowa House of Representatives (1971–1973) and Senate (1973–1992) (b. 1937)
  - Kenneth Ozmon, 90, American-born Canadian academic administrator, president of Saint Mary's University (1979–2000) (b. 1931)
- February 24
  - Ken Burrough, 73, football player (Houston Oilers, New Orleans Saints) (b. 1948)
  - Sally Kellerman, 84, actress (M*A*S*H, Back to School, Brewster McCloud) (b. 1937)
  - Gary North, 80, Christian social theorist and economist (b. 1942)
  - Lionel James, 59, football player (San Diego Chargers) (b. 1962)
  - Dick Versace, 81, basketball coach (Indiana Pacers) (b. 1940)
- February 25
  - Farrah Forke, 54, actress (Wings, Lois & Clark: The New Adventures of Superman) (b. 1968)
- February 26
  - Ralph Ahn, 95, actor (Lawnmower Man 2: Beyond Cyberspace, Amityville: A New Generation, New Girl) (b. 1926)
  - Paul Cantor, 76, literary critic (b. 1945)
  - Barrie R. Cassileth, 85, researcher of complementary and alternative medicine (b. 1938)
  - Snootie Wild, 36, rapper ("Yayo", "Made Me") (b. 1985)
  - Donald Walter Trautman, 85, Roman Catholic prelate, auxiliary bishop of Buffalo (1985–1990) and bishop of Erie (1990–2011) (b. 1936)
- February 27
  - Richard C. Blum, 86, investor (b. 1935)
  - Ned Eisenberg, 65, actor (b. 1957)
  - Kenneth B. Ellerbe, 61, fire chief (DC FEMS) (2011–2014) (b. 1960)
  - Dick Guindon, 86, cartoonist (b. 1935)
  - Ronald Roskens, 89, academic, chancellor of University of Nebraska Omaha (1972–1977) and president of the University of Nebraska system (1977–1989) (b. 1932)
  - Nick Zedd, 63, filmmaker (Geek Maggot Bingo), author, and painter (b. 1958)
- February 28
  - Kirk Baily, 59, actor (Salute Your Shorts, Bumblebee, Trigun) (b. 1963)
  - Ike Delock, 92, baseball player (b. 1929)
  - Mike Fair, politician and businessman, member of the Oklahoma House of Representatives (1979–1986) and the Oklahoma Senate (1988–2004) (b. 1942)
  - Radhika Khanna, 47, Indian-born fashion designer, entrepreneur, and author (b. 1974)

== March ==
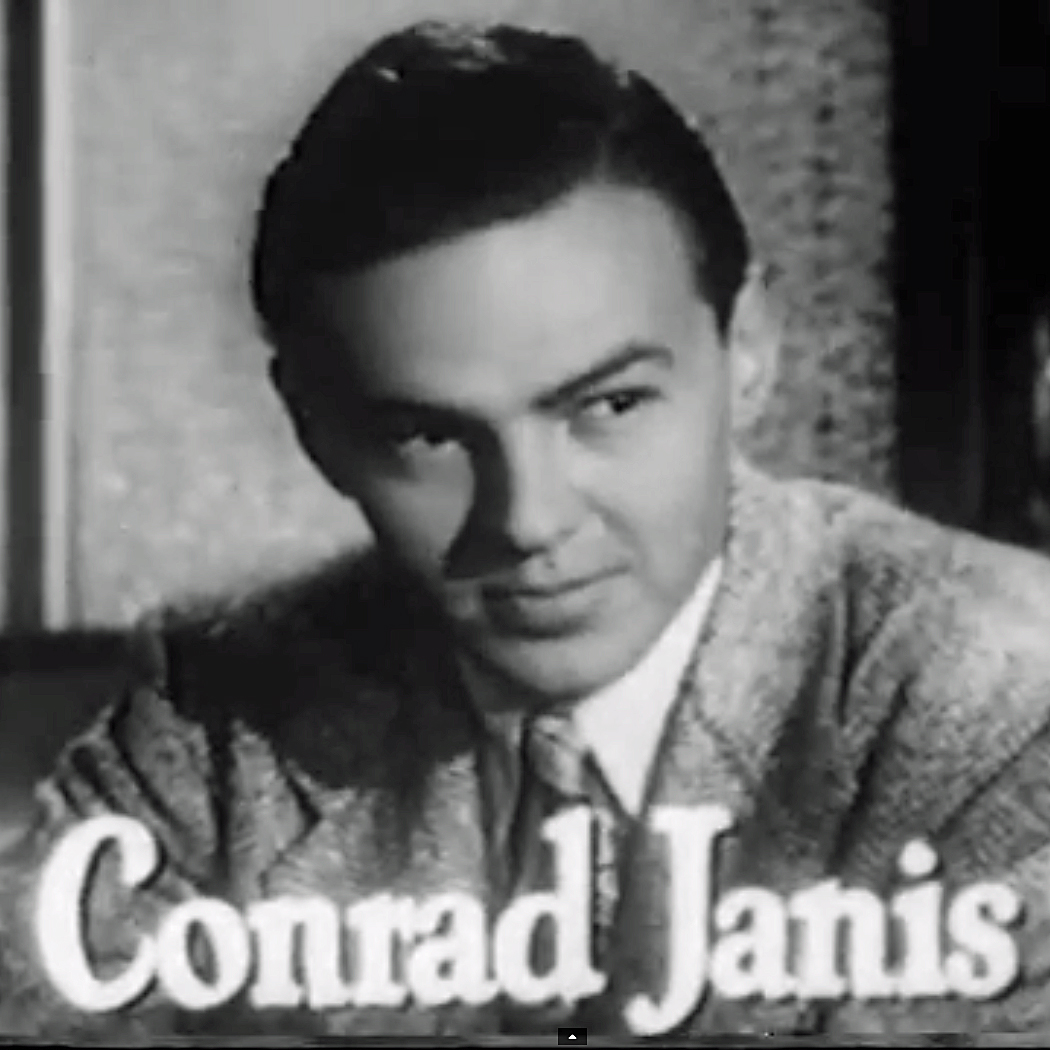
Conrad Janis

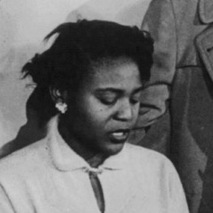
Autherine Lucy

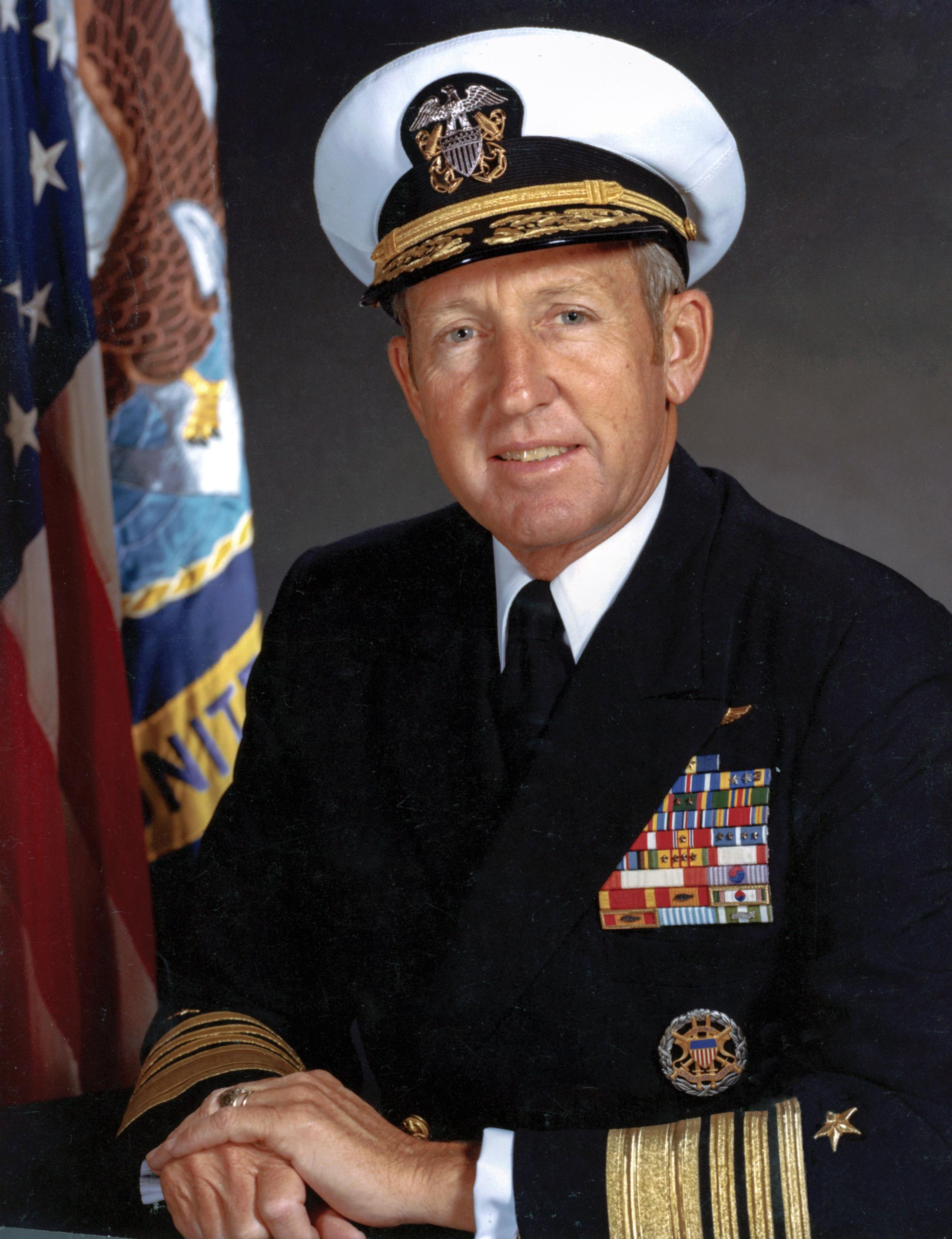
Thomas B. Hayward

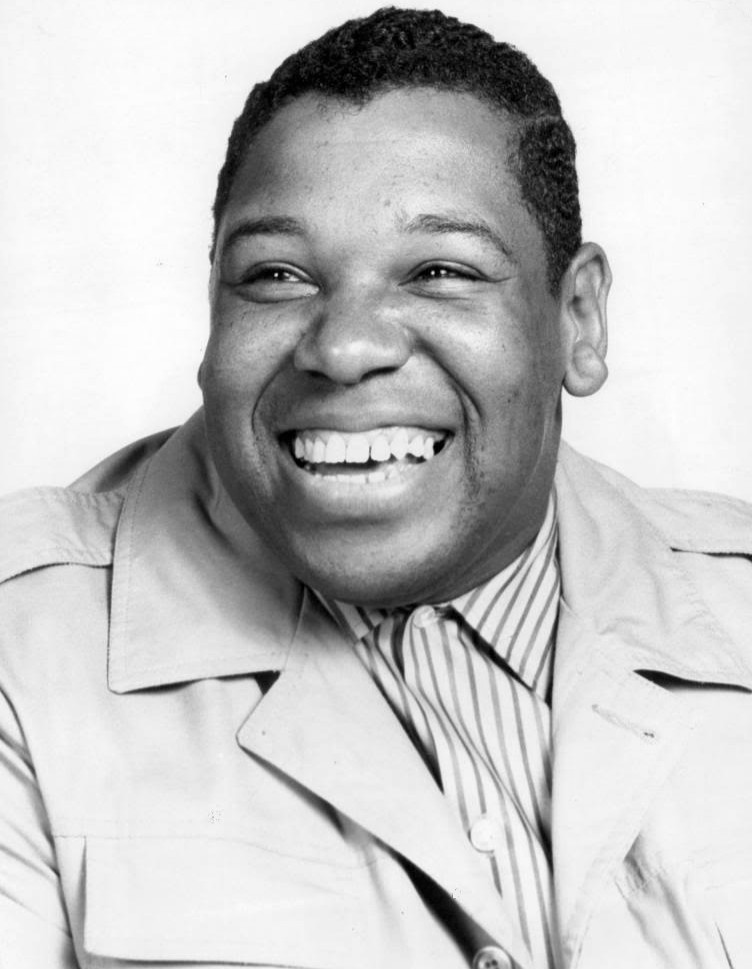
Johnny Brown

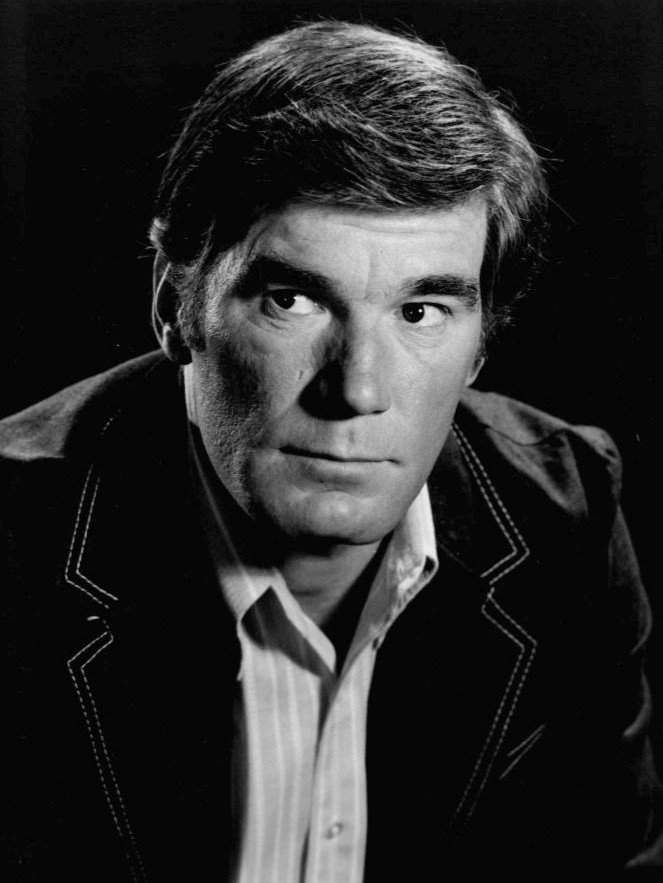
Mitchell Ryan

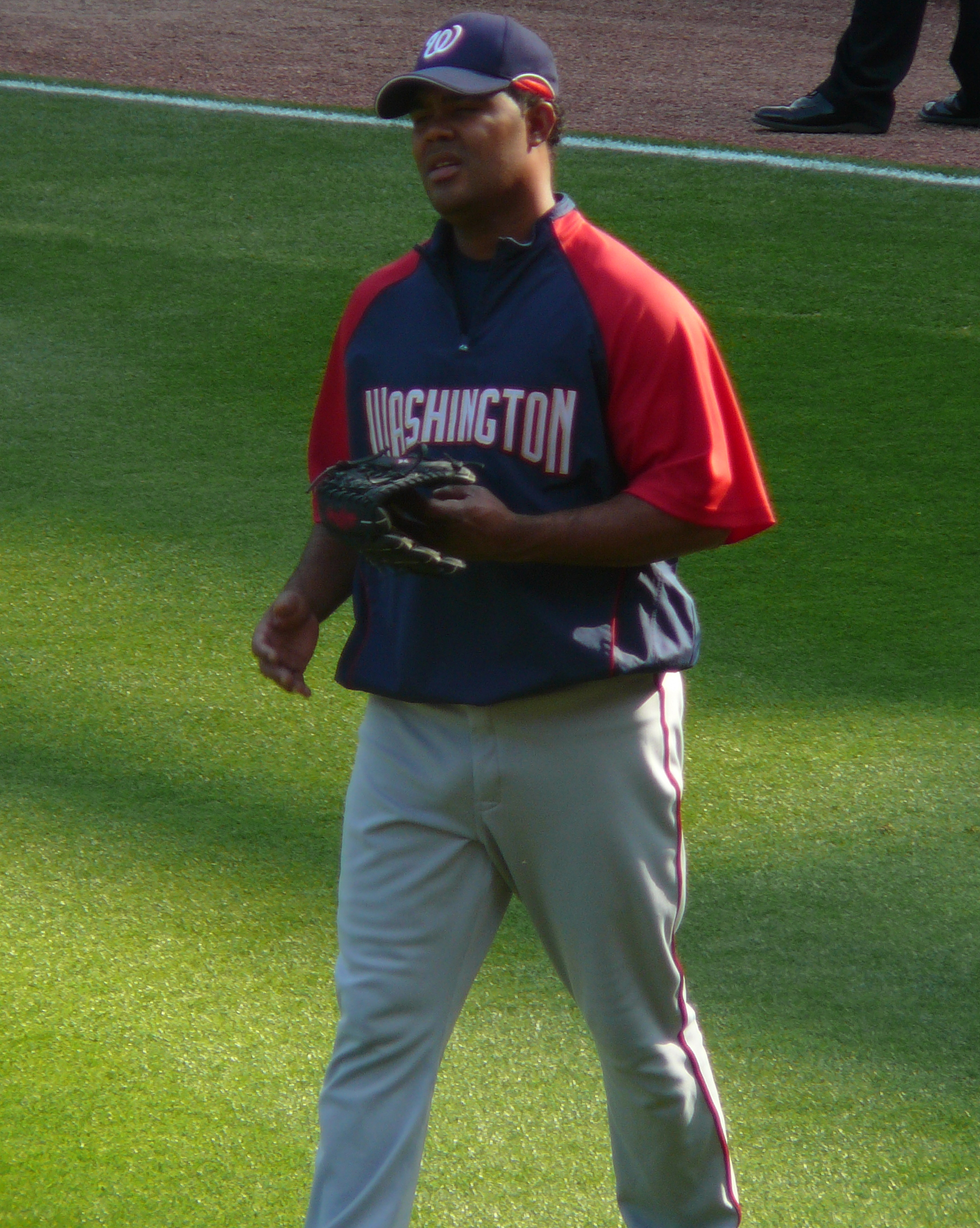
Odalis Pérez

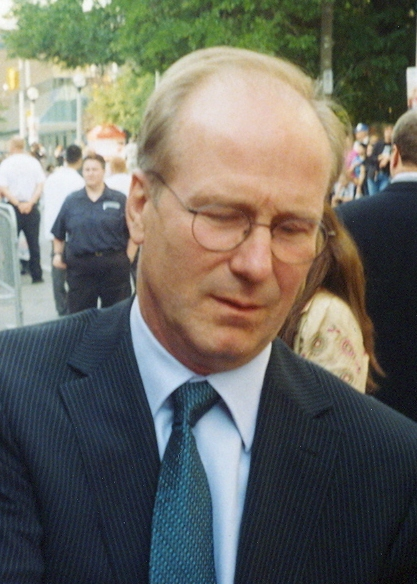
William Hurt

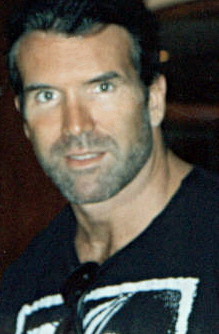
Scott Hall

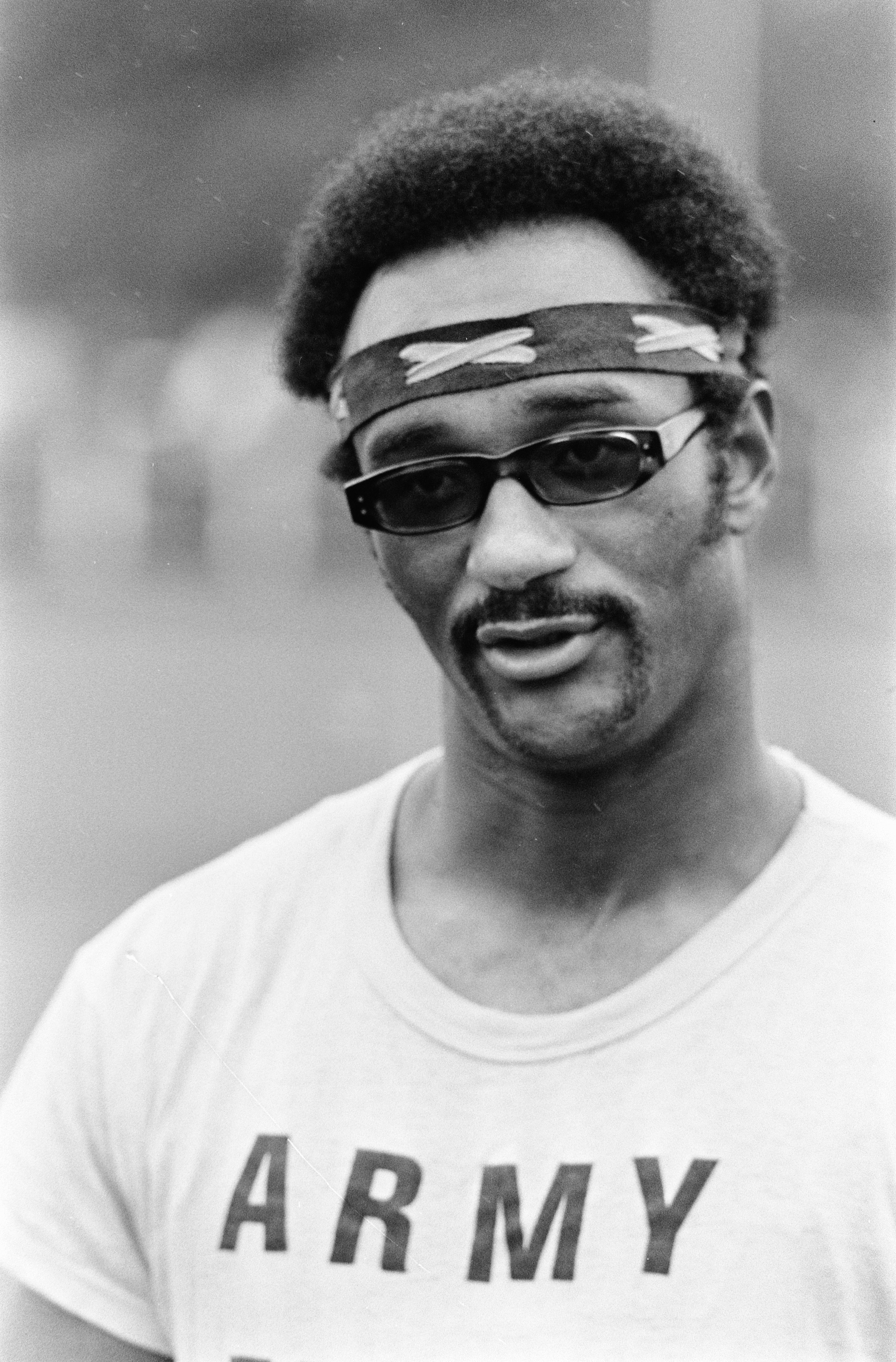
Charles Greene

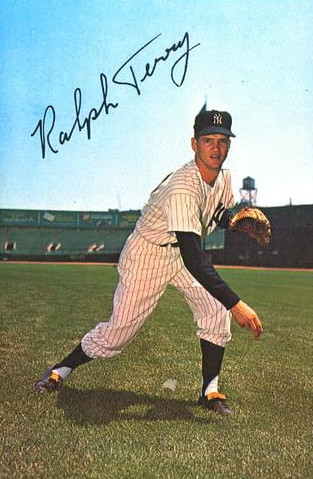
Ralph Terry

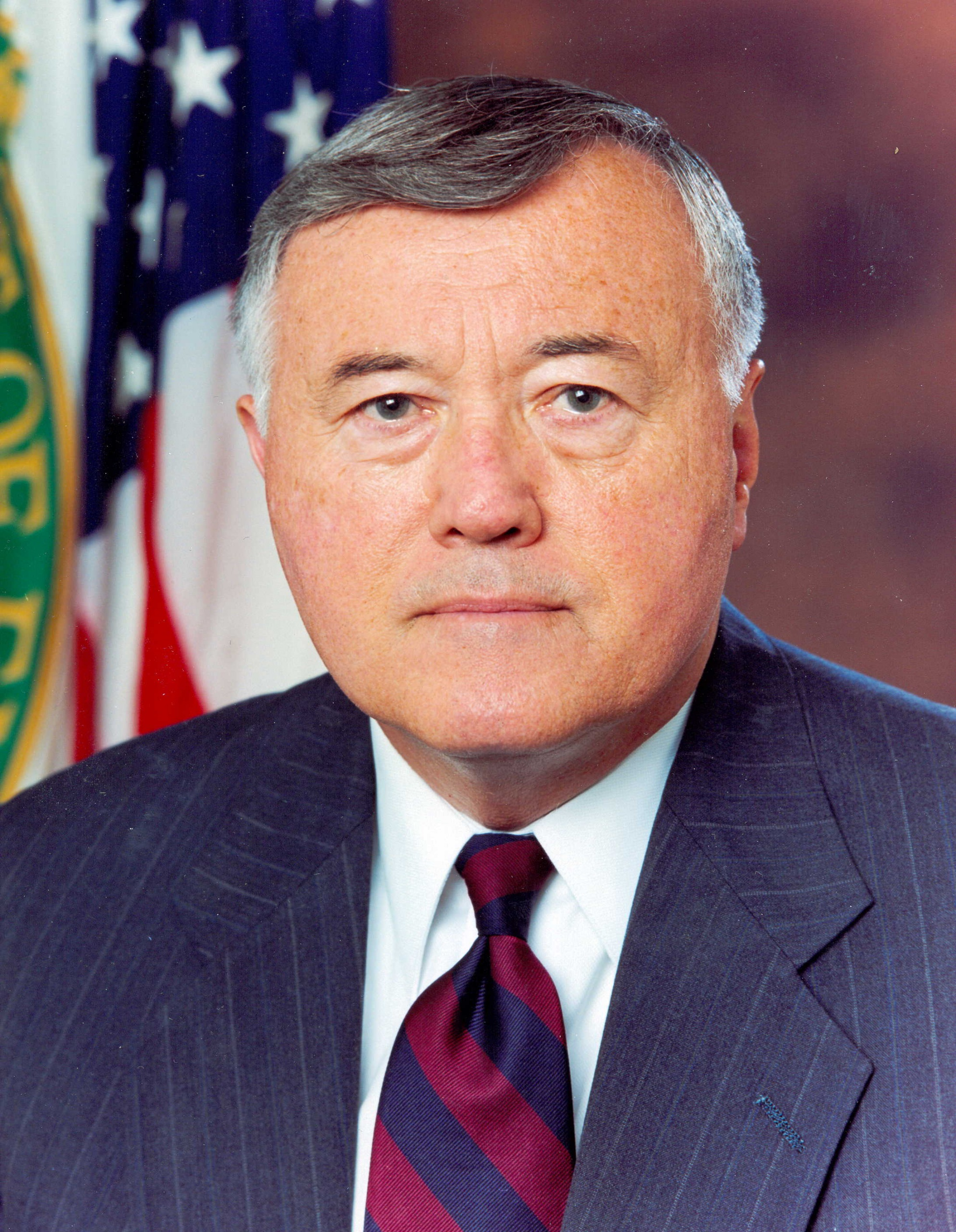
Eugene E. Habiger

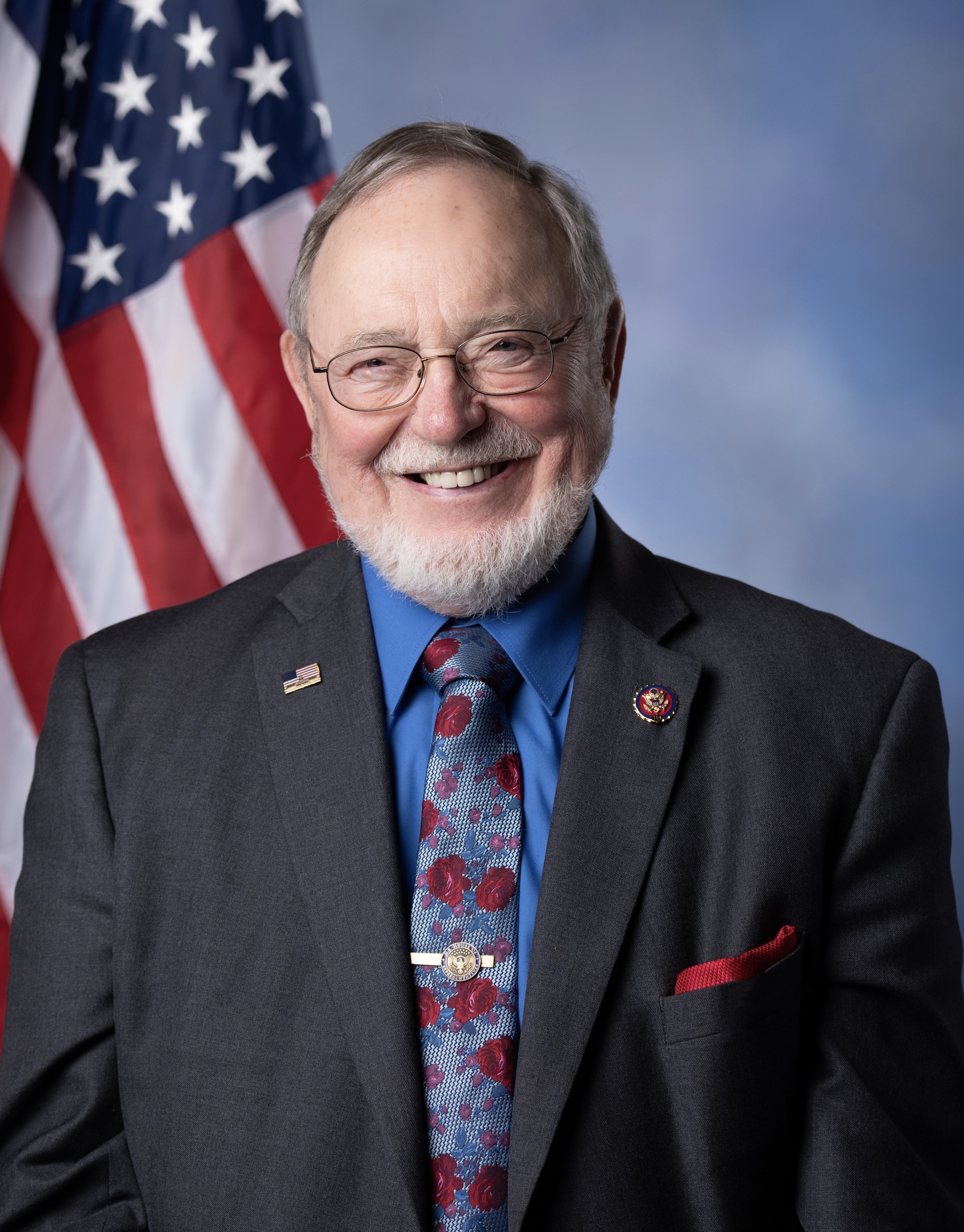
Don Young

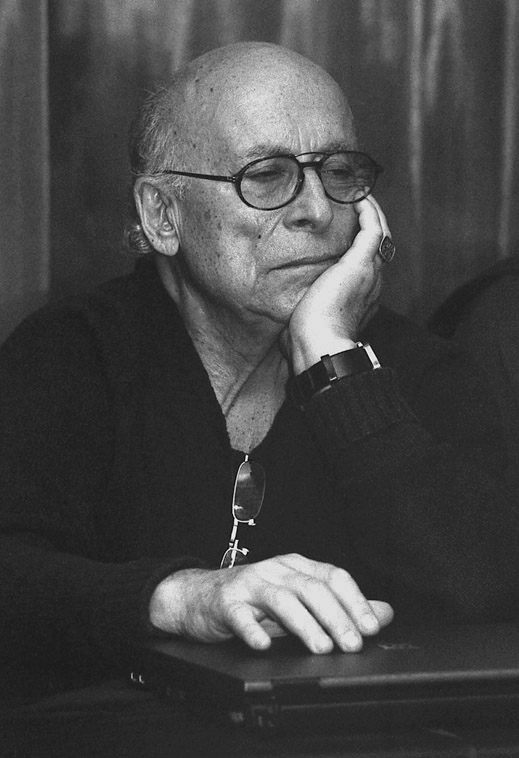
Yuz Aleshkovsky

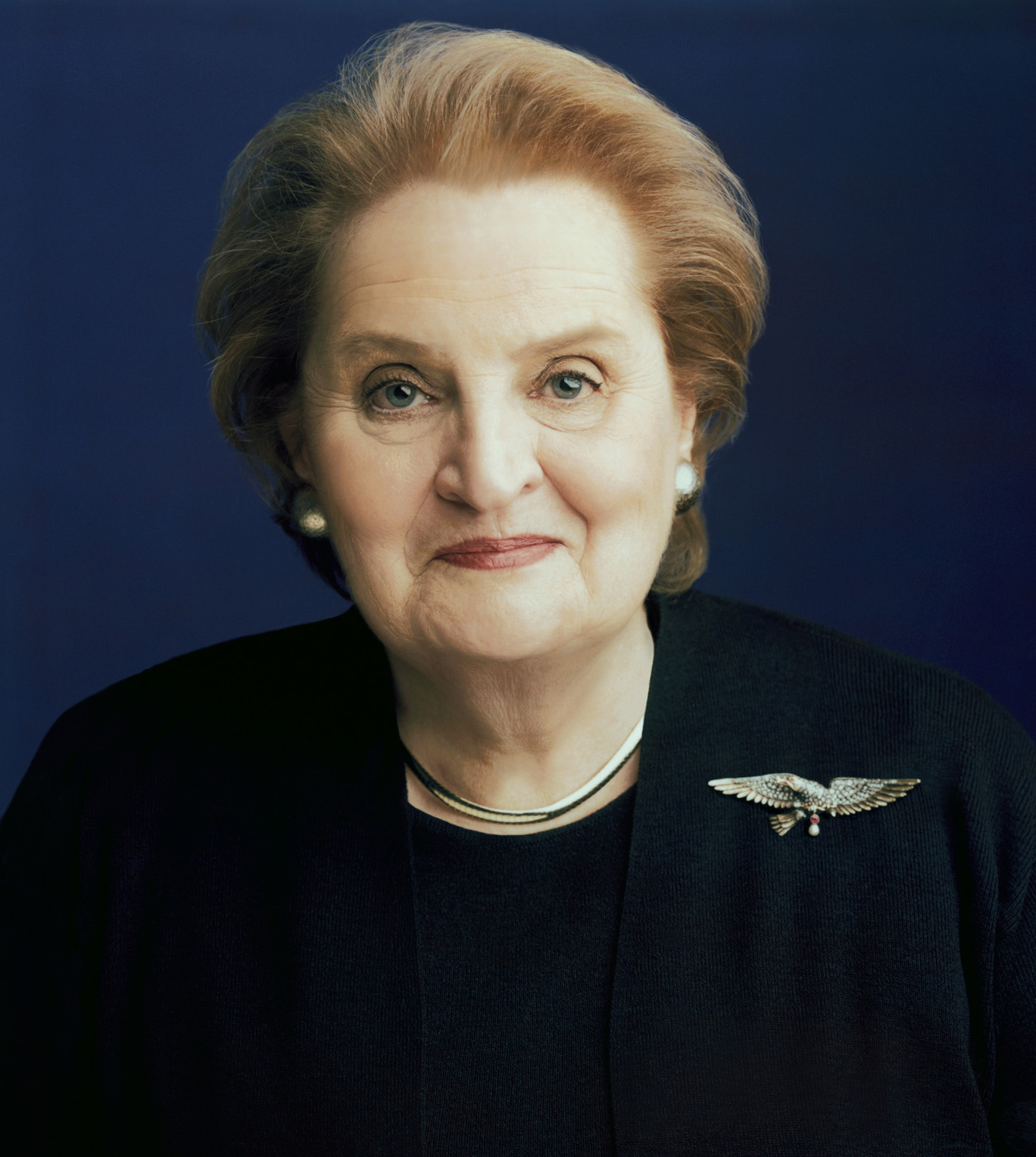
Madeleine Albright

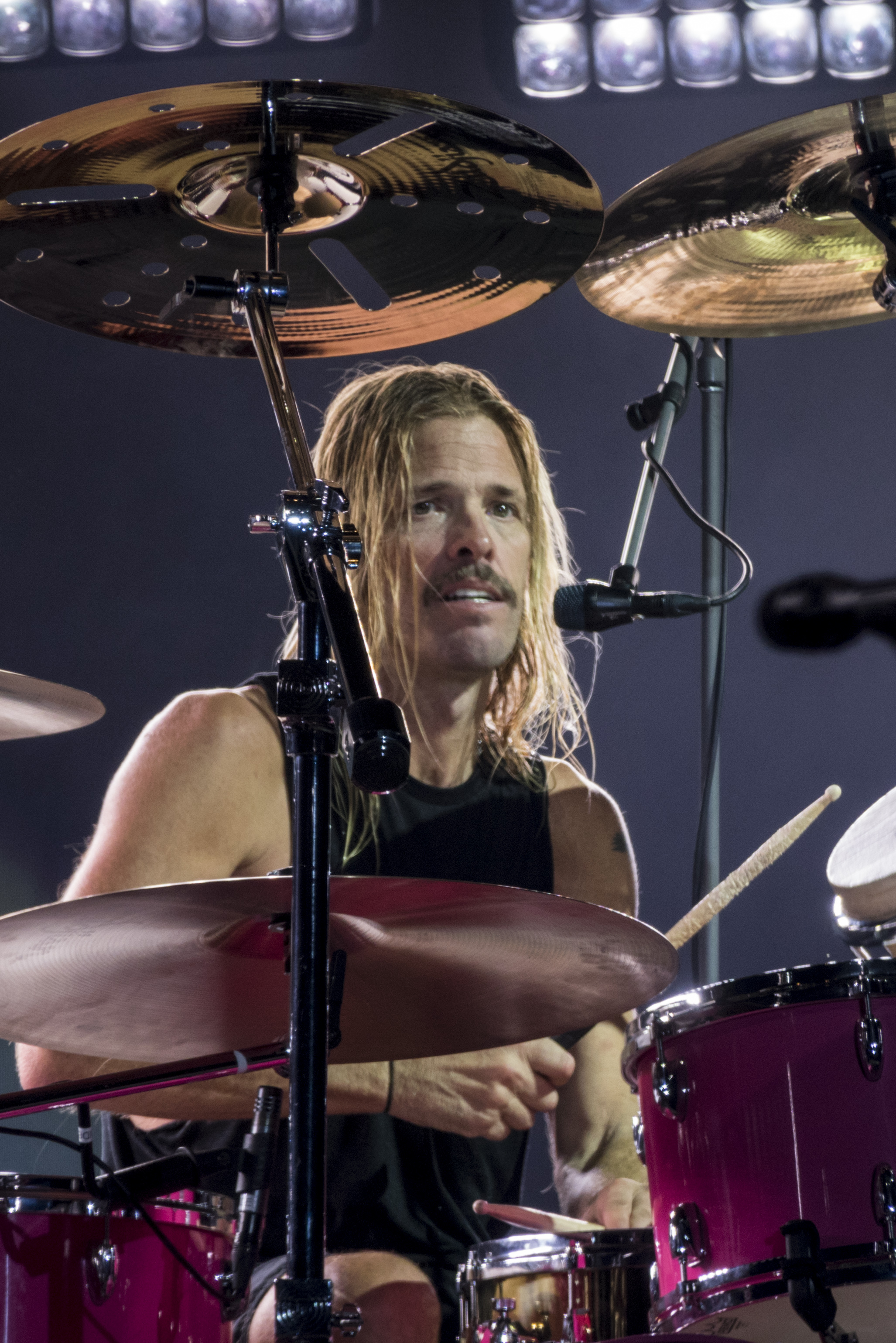
Taylor Hawkins

- March 1
  - George DeLeone, 73, football coach (Southern Connecticut Owls) (b. 1948)
  - Jim Denomie, 67, Ojibwe painter (b. 1954)
  - Conrad Janis, 94, musician and actor (Mork & Mindy, Margie, That Hagen Girl) (b. 1927)
  - Herbert Kelman, 94, social psychologist (b. 1927)
  - Warner Mack, 86, country singer-songwriter ("Is It Wrong (For Loving You)", "The Bridge Washed Out") (b. 1935)
  - Katie Meyer, 22, soccer player (Stanford Cardinal), NCAA champion (2019), (b. 2000)
- March 2
  - Johnny Brown, 84, actor (Good Times, Rowan & Martin's Laugh-In, The Plastic Man Comedy/Adventure Show) and singer (b. 1937)
  - Kenneth Duberstein, 77, lobbyist, White House chief of staff (1988–1989) (b. 1944)
  - Roger Graef, 85, American-born British documentary filmmaker (b. 1936)
  - Alan Ladd Jr., 84, film producer (Braveheart, Gone Baby Gone) and studio executive (20th Century Fox), Oscar winner (1996) (b. 1937)
  - Autherine Lucy, 92, civil rights activist, first African-American student to attend the University of Alabama (b. 1929)
  - Katie Meyer, 22, soccer player (Stanford Cardinal), NCAA champion (2019) (b. 1999)
  - Shane Olivea, 40, football player (San Diego Chargers) (b. 1981)
  - Robert John Rose, 92, Roman Catholic prelate, bishop of Gaylord (1981–1989) and Grand Rapids (1989–2003) (b. 1930)
- March 3
  - Yuan-Shih Chow, 97, Chinese-American probabilist (b. 1924)
  - Tim Considine, 81, actor (My Three Sons, The Mickey Mouse Club, Patton) (b. 1940)
  - Andrea Danyluk, 59, computer scientist (b. 1963)
  - Thomas B. Hayward, 97, Navy admiral, chief of naval operations (1978–1982) (b. 1924)
  - Walter Mears, 87, journalist (Associated Press), Pulitzer Prize winner (1977) (b. 1935)
  - Denroy Morgan, 76, Jamaican-born reggae musician (b. 1945)
- March 4
  - Terry Cooney, 88, baseball umpire (MLB) (b. 1933)
  - Joel Gerber, 81, judge (b. 1940)
  - E. William Henry, 92, lawyer and FCC chairman (1963–1966) (b. 1929)
  - Jimbeau Hinson, 70, country music singer-songwriter (b. 1951)
  - Elsa Klensch, 92, Australian-born journalist and television presenter (Style with Elsa Klensch) (b. 1930)
  - Peter Marcuse, 93, German-American lawyer and urban planner (b. 1928)
  - Mitchell Ryan, 88, actor (Dark Shadows, Dharma & Greg, Lethal Weapon) (b. 1933)
- March 5
  - Jeff Howell, 60, rock bassist (Foghat, Outlaws) (b. 1961)
  - Adrienne L. Kaeppler, 86, anthropologist and author (b. 1935)
  - Roy Winston, 81, football player (Minnesota Vikings) (b. 1940)
- March 6
  - Mike Cross, 57, guitarist (Sponge) (b. 1964–1965)
  - Frank Fleming, 68, politician, member of the Montana House of Representatives (since 2018) (b. 1953)
- March 7
  - Renny Cushing, 69, politician, four-time member of the New Hampshire House of Representatives (b. 1952)
  - John F. Dunlap, 99, politician, member of the California State Assembly (1967–1974) and senate (1974–1978) (b. 1922)
  - Donna Scheeder, 74, librarian, president of IFLA (2015–2017) (b. 1947)
- March 8
  - Nelson W. Aldrich Jr., 86, author (b. 1935)
  - David Bennett Sr., 57, patient, first person to undergo a genetically modified heart xenotransplantation (b. 1964)
  - Joseph R. Bowen, 71, politician, member of the Kentucky Senate (2011–2019), (b. 1950) (death announced on this date)
  - Margaret Farrow, 87, politician, lieutenant governor of Wisconsin (2001–2003) (b. 1934)
  - Grandpa Elliott, 77, musician, (b. 1944)
  - Johnny Grier, 74, football official (NFL) and first black referee (b. 1947)
  - Leo Marx, 102, historian (b. 1919)
  - Ron Miles, 58, jazz musician (b. 1963)
  - Gyo Obata, 99, architect (b. 1923)
  - Jim Richards, 75, football player (New York Jets) (b. 1946)
  - Sargur Srihari, 72, Indian-American scientist (b. 1949)
  - Ron Stander, 77, boxer, (b. 1944)
  - Yuriko, 102, dancer and choreographer (b. 1920)
- March 9
  - Aijaz Ahmad, 81, Indian-born Marxist philosopher (b. 1940)
  - John Korty, 85, film director (The Autobiography of Miss Jane Pittman, Who Are the DeBolts? And Where Did They Get Nineteen Kids?) and animator (b. 1936)
  - Jimmy Lydon, 98, actor (Twice Blessed, Life with Father, The First Hundred Years) (b. 1923)
  - Donald Pinkel, 95, pediatrician, director of St. Jude Children's Research Hospital (1962–1973) (b. 1926)
  - Richard Podolor, 86, musician (The Pets) and record producer (Steppenwolf, Three Dog Night) (b. 1936)
  - Louis Weil, 86, Episcopal priest and liturgical scholar (b. 1935)
  - David Wheeler, 72, politician, member of the Alabama House of Representatives (since 2018) (b. 1949)
- March 10
  - Robert Cardenas, 102, Mexican-born air force brigadier general (b. 1920)
  - Emilio Delgado, 81, actor (Sesame Street, I Will Fight No More Forever, A Case of You) (b. 1940)
  - Mario Gigante, 98, mobster (Genovese crime family) (b. 1923)
  - Bobbie Nelson, 91, pianist and singer (b. 1931)
  - Odalis Pérez, 44, Dominican-born baseball player (Atlanta Braves, Los Angeles Dodgers, Kansas City Royals) (b. 1977)
- March 11
  - Brad Martin, 48, country singer ("Before I Knew Better") (b. 1973)
  - Timmy Thomas, 77, R&B singer-songwriter ("Why Can't We Live Together") and musician (b. 1944)
  - Cora Faith Walker, 37, politician, member of the Missouri House of Representatives (2017–2019) (b. 1984)
- March 12
  - Barry Bailey, 73, rock guitarist (Atlanta Rhythm Section) (b. 1948)
  - Traci Braxton, 50, R&B singer (The Braxtons) and television personality (Braxton Family Values) (b. 1971)
  - Robert Vincent O'Neil, 91, screenwriter, film director (Wonder Women, Angel, Avenging Angel) and producer (b. 1930)
  - Jessica Williams, 73, jazz pianist and composer (b. 1948)
- March 13
  - Maureen Howard, 91, novelist, memoirist, and editor (b. 1930)
  - William Hurt, 71, actor (Kiss of the Spider Woman, Broadcast News, The Incredible Hulk), Oscar winner (1986) (b. 1950)
  - Sam Massell, 94, businessman and politician, mayor of Atlanta (1970–1974) (b. 1927)
  - Bernard Nussbaum, 84, attorney and former White House counsel (b. 1937)
  - Brent Renaud, 50, photojournalist, writer (The New York Times), and filmmaker (Warrior Champions: From Baghdad to Beijing) (b. 1971)
- March 14
  - Michael Cudahy, 97, entrepreneur and philanthropist (b. 1924)
  - Jack R. Gannon, 85, author and deaf culture historian (b. 1936)
  - Charles Greene, 76, sprinter, Olympic champion (1968), and retired U.S. Army officer (b. 1945)
  - Scott Hall, 63, professional wrestler (b. 1958)
  - Eileen Mackevich, 82, historian (b. 1939)
  - Michael F. Price, 70, value investor and philanthropist (b. 1951)
  - Pervis Spann, 89, broadcaster, music promoter and radio personality (WVON) (b. 1932)
  - Steve Wilhite, 74, computer scientist (b. 1948)
- March 15
  - Arnold W. Braswell, 96, Air Force lieutenant general and veteran of the Korean War and the Vietnam War (b. 1925)
  - Lauro Cavazos, 95, politician, secretary of education (1988–1990) (b. 1927)
  - Dennis González, 67, jazz trumpeter (b. 1954)
  - Marrio Grier, 50, football player (New England Patriots) (b. 1971)
  - Barbara Maier Gustern, 87, vocal coach (b. 1935)
  - John T. "Til" Hazel, 91, real estate developer (b. 1930)
  - Randy J. Holland, 75, judge, member of the Delaware Supreme Court (1986–2017) (b. 1947)
  - Marilyn Miglin, 83, Czechoslovak-born entrepreneur, inventor and television host (Home Shopping Network) (b. 1938)
  - Eugene Parker, 94, solar physicist (Parker Solar Probe) (b. 1927)
- March 16
  - Merri Dee, 85, journalist (WGN-TV) (b. 1936)
  - Vic Fazio, 79, politician, chair of the House Democratic Caucus (1995–1999), member of the U.S. House of Representatives (1979–1999) (b. 1942)
  - Barbara Morrison, 72, jazz singer (b. 1949)
  - Ralph Terry, 86, baseball player (New York Yankees, Kansas City Athletics, New York Mets). World Series champion (1961, 1962) (b. 1936)
- March 17
  - Emmett C. Burns Jr., 81, politician, member of the Maryland House of Delegates (1995–2015) (b. 1940)
  - Dru C. Gladney, 65, anthropologist (b. 1956)
  - Mish Michaels, 53, Indian-born meteorologist (WHDH, The Weather Channel) (b. 1968) (death announced on this date)
- March 18
  - John Clayton, 67, Hall of Fame sportswriter and reporter (ESPN) (b. 1954)
  - Eugene E. Habiger, 82, USAF four-star general, Commander in Chief for the United States Strategic Command (USCINCSTRAT) (1996–1998), and Director of Security and Emergency Operations, U.S. Department of Energy (1999–2001) (b. 1939)
  - Younes Nazarian, 91, Iranian-American investor and philanthropist (b. 1931)
  - Bobby Weinstein, 82, songwriter ("Goin' Out of My Head", "It's Gonna Take a Miracle ", "I'm on the Outside (Looking In)") (b. 1939) (death announced on this date)
  - Don Young, 88, politician, member of the U.S. House of Representatives (since 1973), Alaska Senate (1971–1973), and House of Representatives (1967–1971), 45th Dean of the House (December 5, 2017 – March 18, 2022) (b. 1933)
- March 19
  - Linda Garrou, 79, politician, member of the North Carolina Senate (1999–2013) (b. 1943)
  - Pat Goss, 80, mechanic and television presenter (MotorWeek) (b. 1942–1943)
- March 20
  - Marina Goldovskaya, 80, Russian-American documentary film director, academic, and cinematographer (b. 1941)
  - Brent Petrus, 46, football player (New York Dragons) (b. 1975)
  - John V. Roach, 83, microcomputer pioneer, led development of the TRS-80 (b. 1938)
  - Tom Young, 89, basketball coach (Rutgers Scarlet Knights, Catholic University Cardinals, Old Dominion Monarchs) (b. 1932)
- March 21
  - Yuz Aleshkovsky, 92, Russian-American writer, poet, and singer-songwriter (b. 1929)
  - Harold Curry, 89, politician, member of the New Jersey General Assembly (1964–1968) (b. 1932)
  - Sara Suleri Goodyear, 68, Pakistani-born writer (b. 1953)
  - Kip Hawley, 68, businessman and government official, administrator of the Transportation Security Administration (2005–2009) (b. 1953)
  - Lee Koppelman, 94, urban planner (b. 1927)
  - Verne Long, 96, politician, member of the Minnesota House of Representatives (1963–1974) (b. 1925)
  - LaShun Pace, 60, gospel singer (b. 1962)
- March 22
  - Robert D. Cess, 89, atmospheric scientist (b. 1933)
  - Grindstone, 29, racehorse, winner of the 1996 Kentucky Derby (b. 1993)
  - Elnardo Webster, 74, basketball player (UG Gorizia, New York Nets, CB Cajabilbao) (b. 1948)
- March 23
  - Madeleine Albright, 84, Czech-born politician, U.S. Secretary of State (1997–2001), U.S. Ambassador to the United Nations (1993–1997), first female Secretary of State (b. 1937)
  - Charles G. Boyd, 83, Air Force general (b. 1938)
  - Kaneaster Hodges Jr., 83, politician, senator (1977–1979) (b. 1938)
  - Edward Johnson III, 91, businessman (Fidelity Investments) (b. 1930)
- March 24
  - Harold Akin, 77, football player (San Diego Chargers) (b. 1945)
  - Kirk Baptiste, 59, Olympic sprinter and silver medalist (1984) (b. 1962)
  - Louie Simmons, 74, powerlifter and strength coach (b. 1945)
  - Gil Stein, 94, lawyer, president of the National Hockey League (1992–1993) (b. 1928)
- March 25
  - Dirck Halstead, 85, photojournalist (b. 1936)
  - Taylor Hawkins, 50, Hall of Fame musician and drummer (Foo Fighters, Taylor Hawkins and the Coattail Riders, The Birds of Satan) (b. 1972)
  - Kathryn Hays, 88, actress (As the World Turns) (b. 1933)
  - Keith Martin, 55, R&B singer (b. 1966)
  - Kenny McFadden, 61, American-born New Zealand basketball player and coach (Wellington Saints) (b. 1960–1961)
- March 26
  - Jeff Carson, 58, country singer ("Not on Your Love", "The Car", "Holdin' Onto Somethin'") (b. 1963)
  - Keaton Pierce, 31, singer and frontman for Too Close to Touch (b. 1990)
  - Joe Williams, 88, college basketball coach (Florida State Seminoles, Furman Paladins, Jacksonville Dolphins) (b. 1935/1936)
- March 27
  - Joan Joyce, 81, Hall of Fame softball player (Raybestos Brakettes), coach (Florida Atlantic Owls) and golfer (LPGA Tour) (b. 1940)
  - Rocky King, 61–62, professional wrestler and referee (WCW) (b. 1960)
  - Martin Pope, 103, physical chemist (b. 1918)
  - James Vaupel, 76, scientist (b. 1945)
- March 28
  - Marvin J. Chomsky, 92, television director (Roots, The Wild Wild West, Star Trek) (b. 1929)
  - Lee Kelly, 89, sculptor (b. 1932)
- March 29
  - Paul Herman, 76, actor (The Sopranos) (b. 1946)
  - Nancy Milford, 84, biographer (b. 1938)
  - Ted Mooney, 70, author and journalist (Art in America) (b. 1951–1952)
- March 30
  - Martin Hochertz, 53, football player (Washington Redskins, Miami Dolphins) (b. 1968)
  - Bill Sylvester, 93, football player (Butler Bulldogs) (b. 1928)
- March 31
  - Shirley Burkovich, 89, baseball player (Chicago Colleens, Springfield Sallies, Rockford Peaches) (b. 1933)
  - Joanne G. Emmons, 88, politician, member of the Michigan House of Representatives (1987–1990) and Senate (1991–2002) (b. 1934)
  - Richard Howard, 92, poet (b. 1929)
  - Joseph Kalichstein, 76, classical pianist (b. 1946)

== April ==
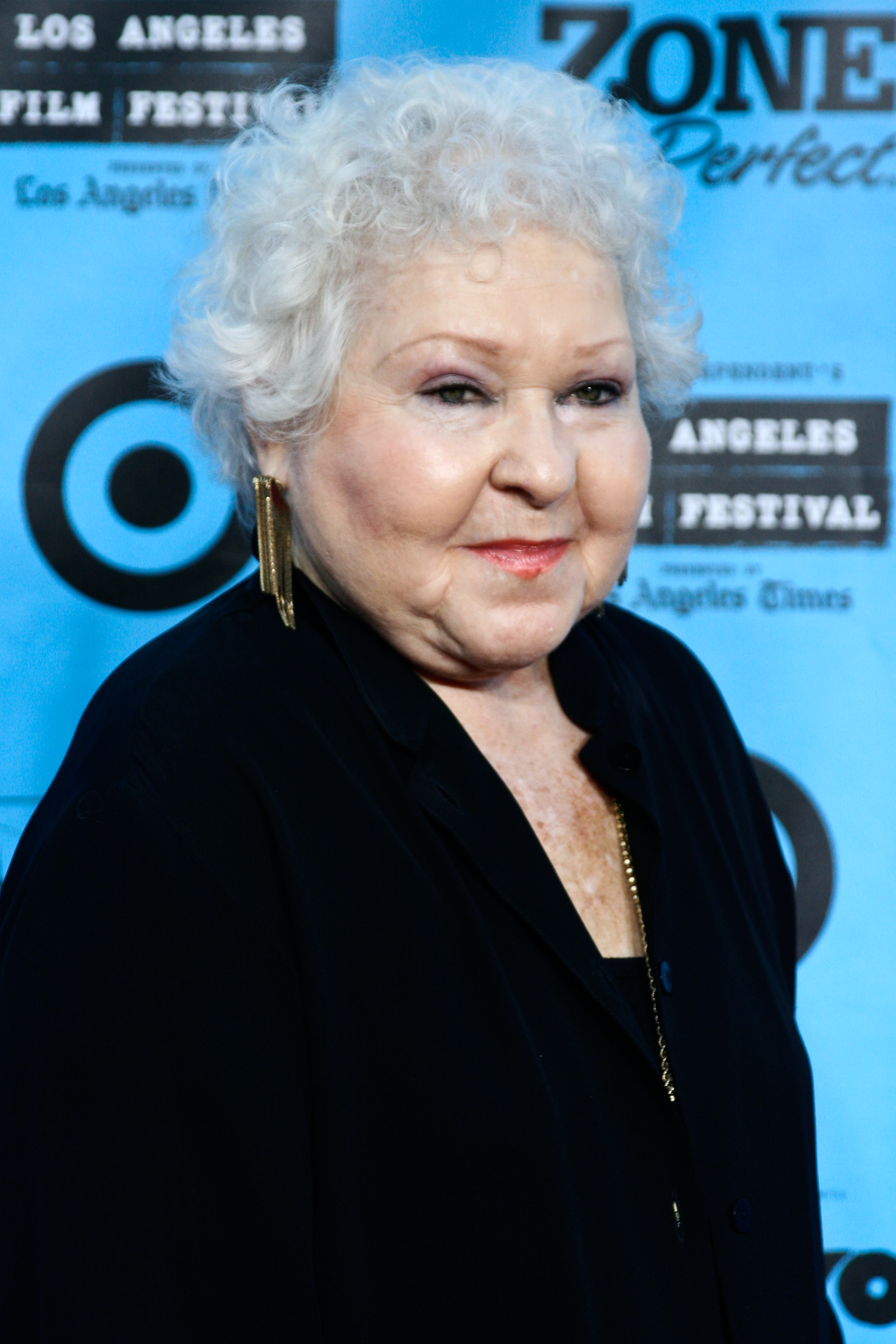
Estelle Harris

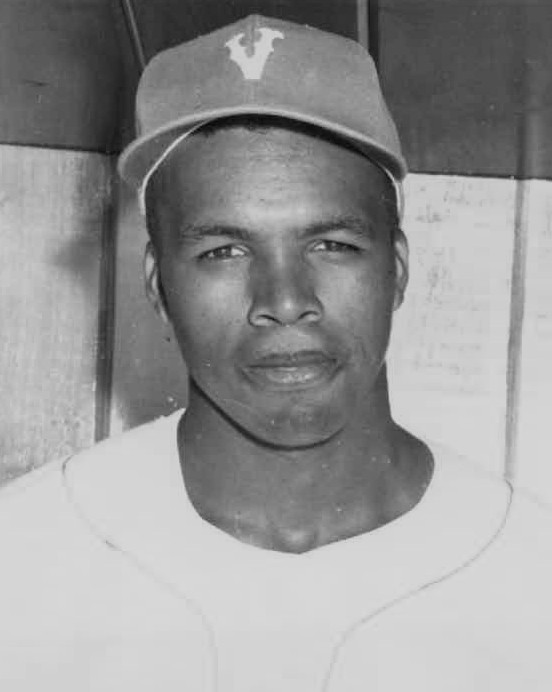
Tommy Davis

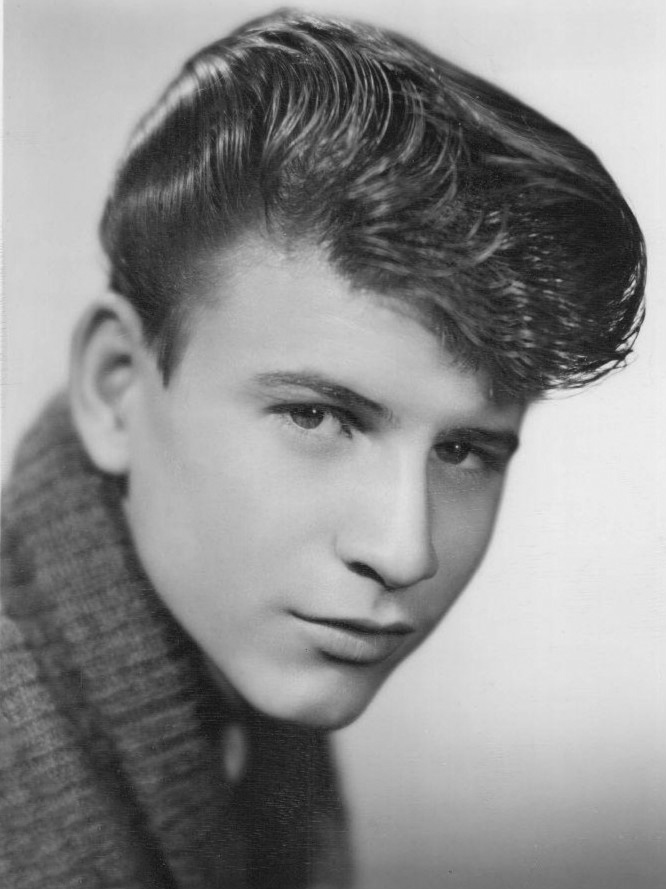
Bobby Rydell

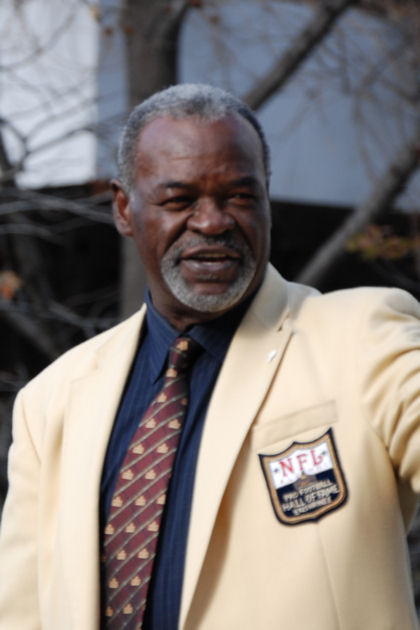
Rayfield Wright

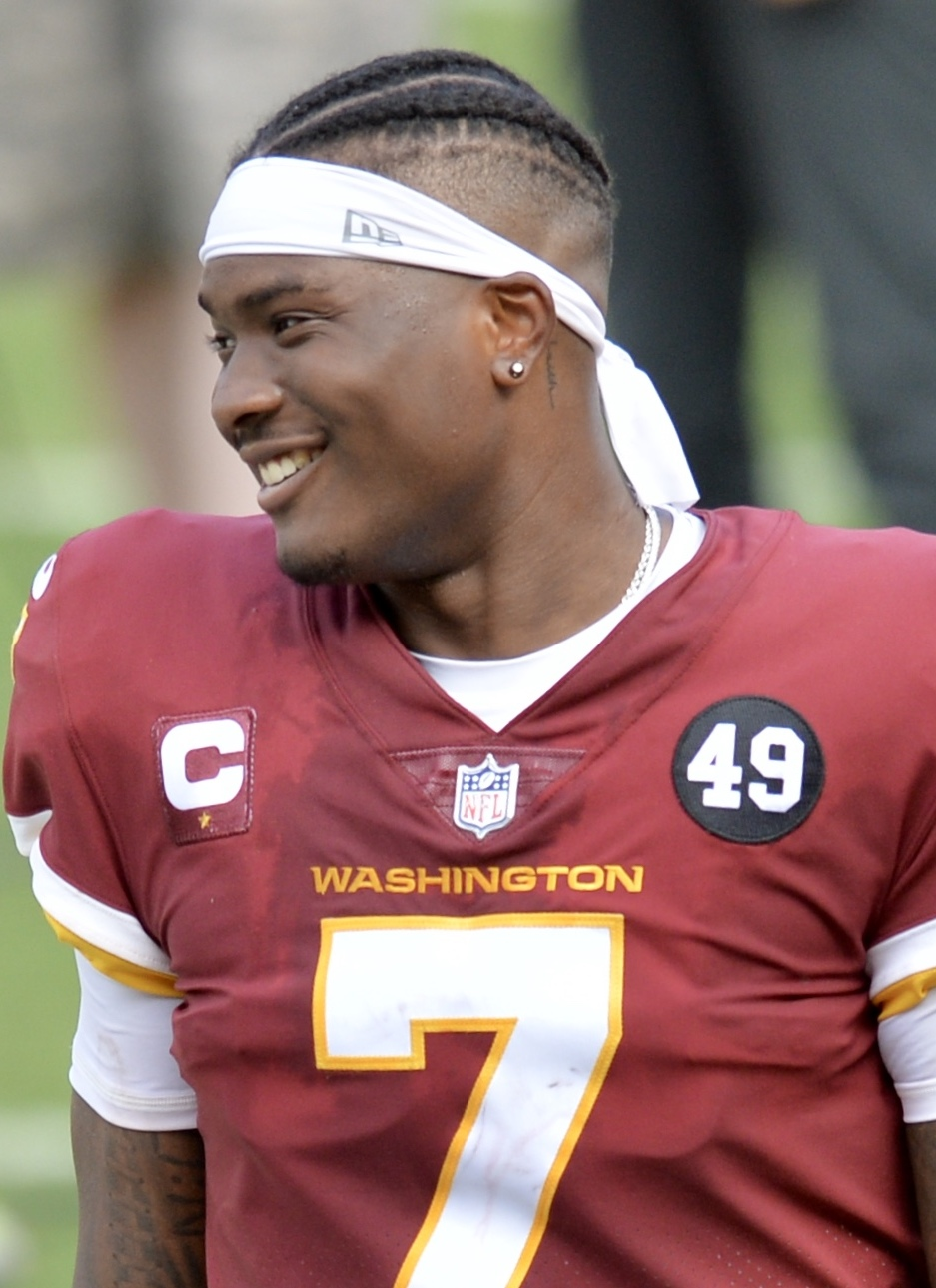
Dwayne Haskins

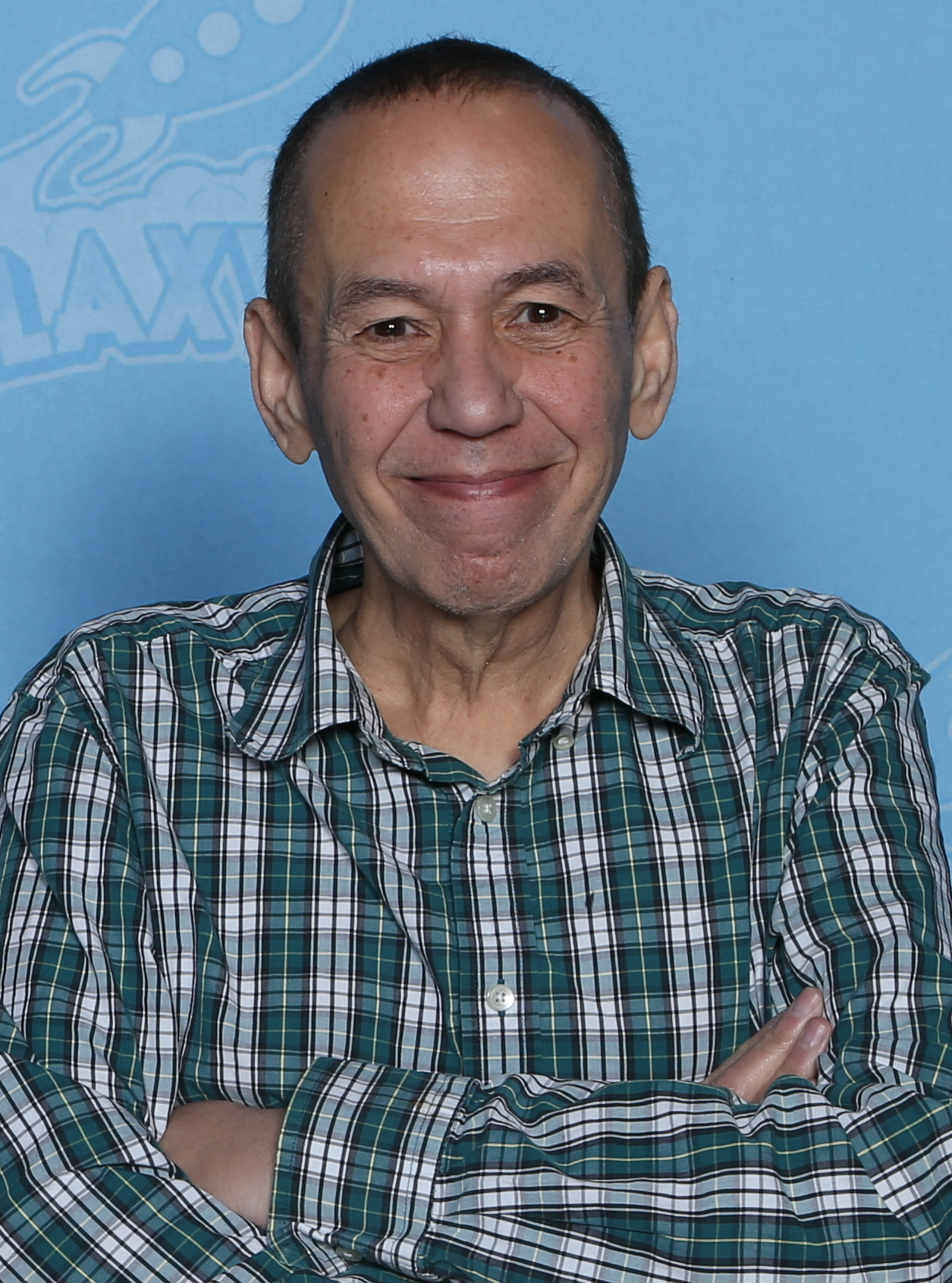
Gilbert Gottfried

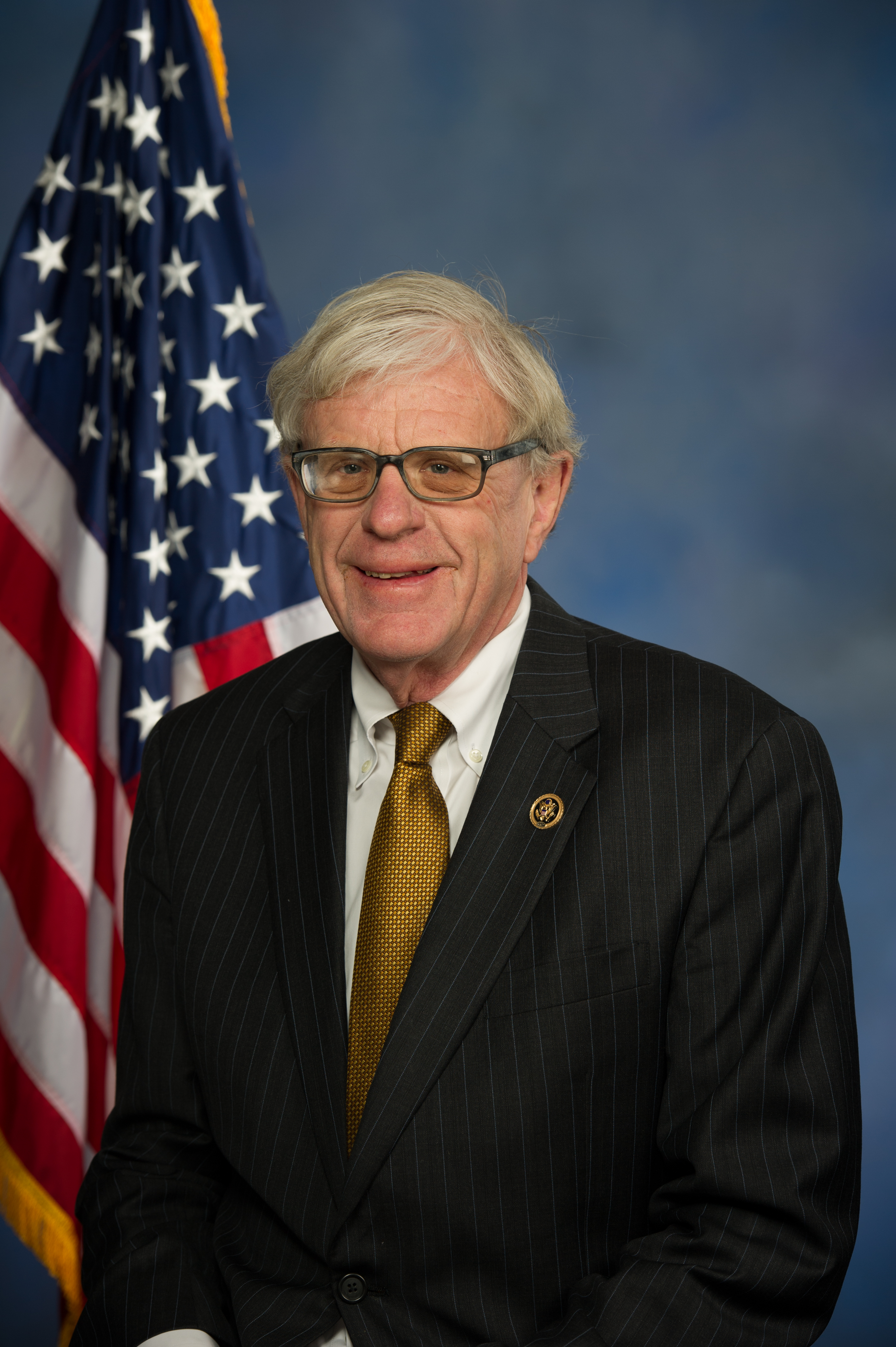
Brad Ashford

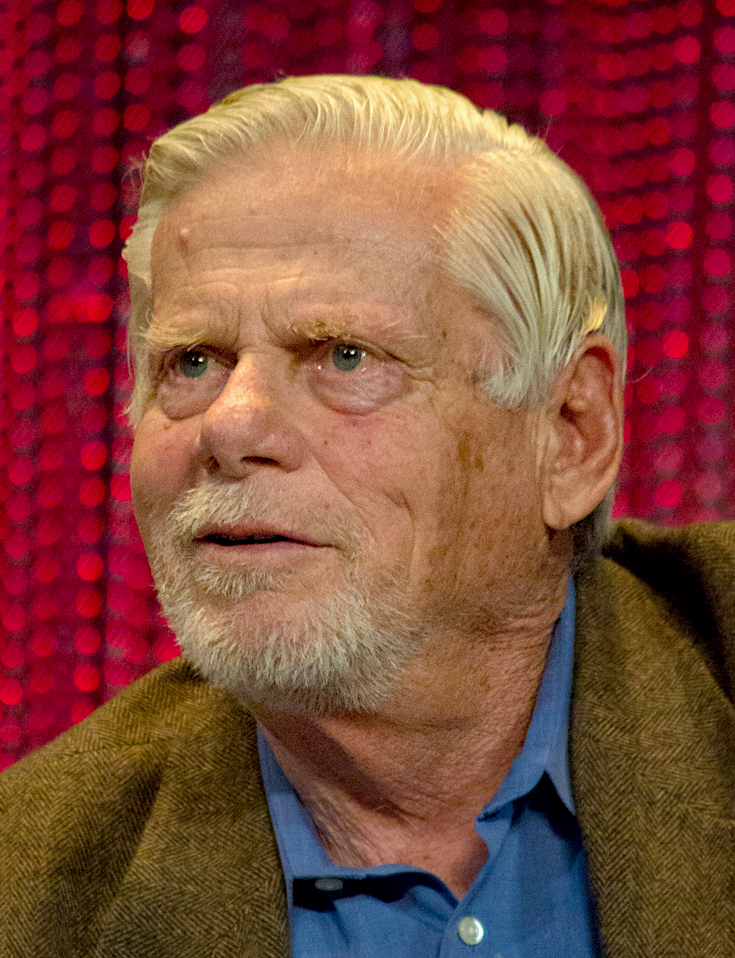
Robert Morse

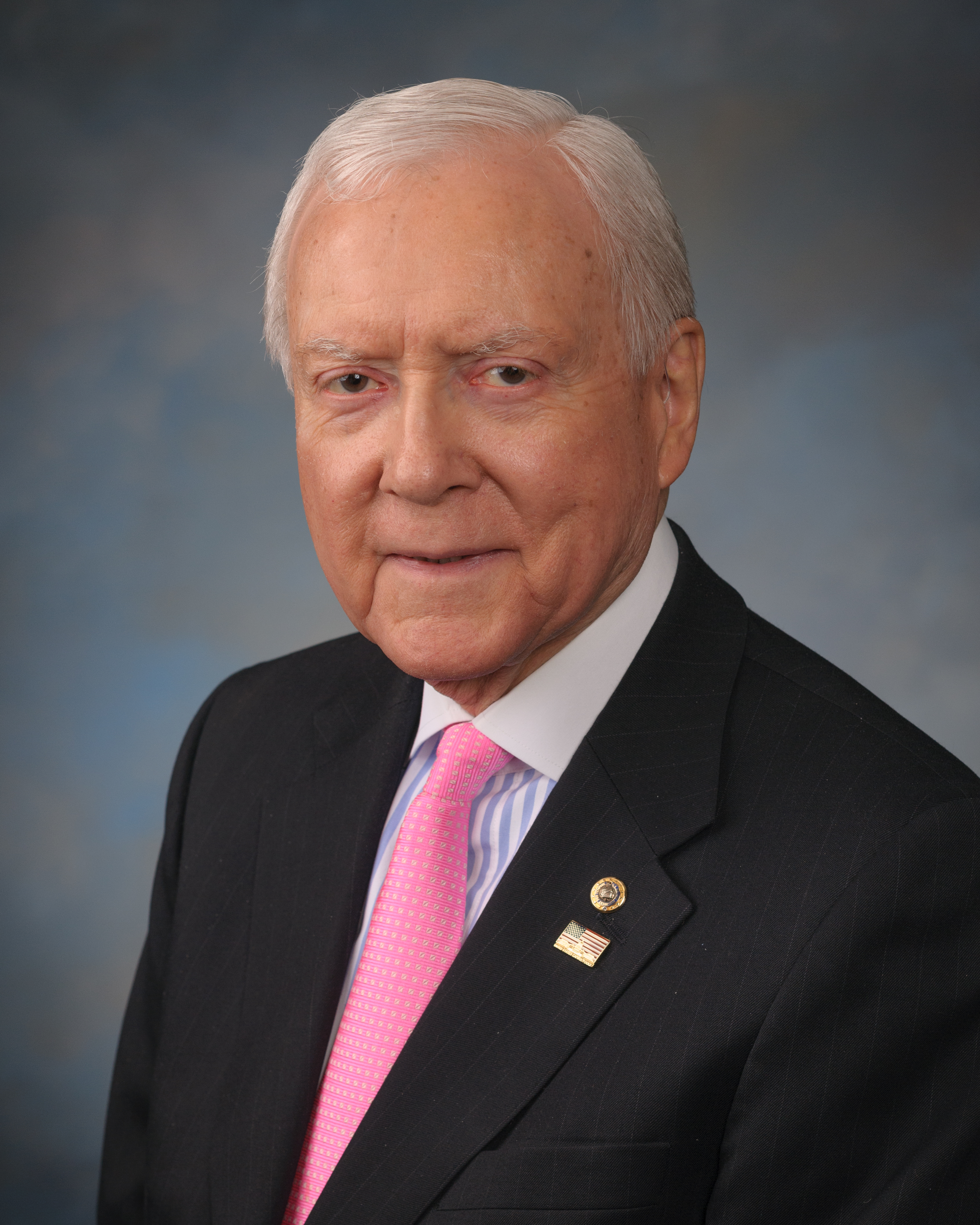
Orrin Hatch

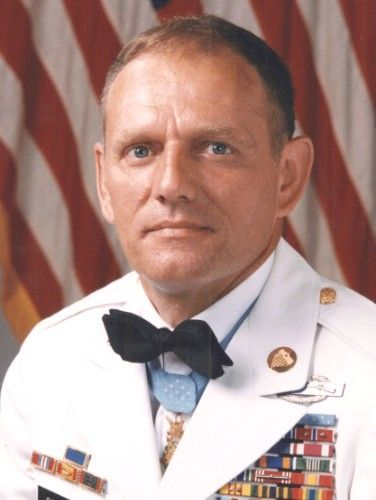
Kenneth E. Stumpf

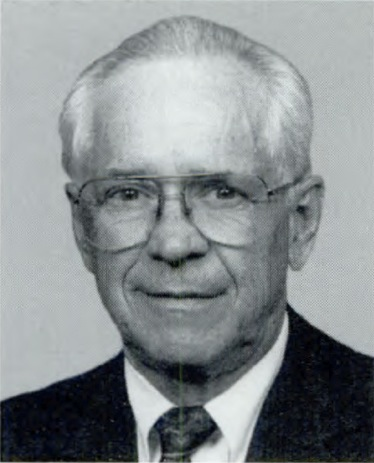
J. Roy Rowland

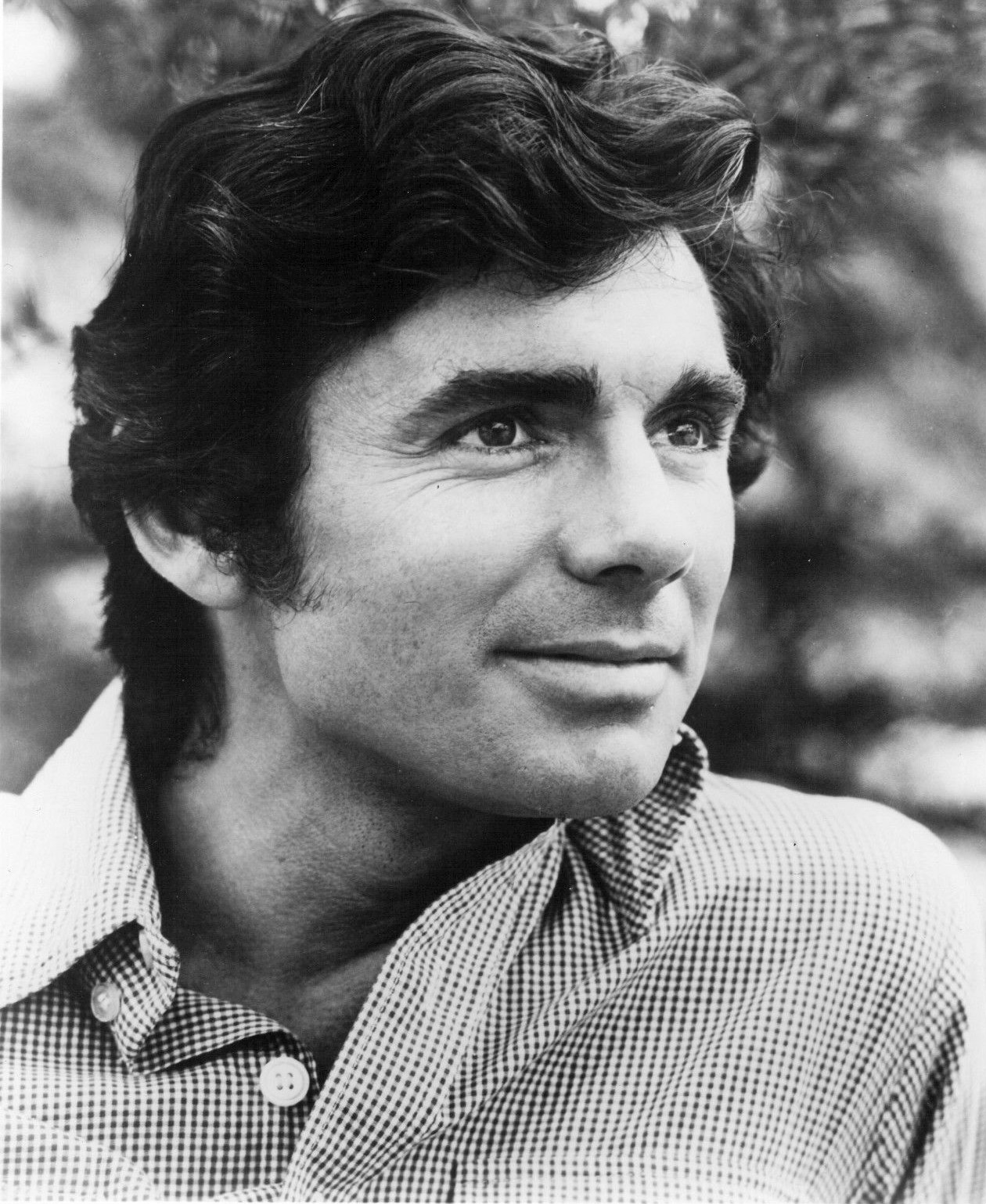
David Birney

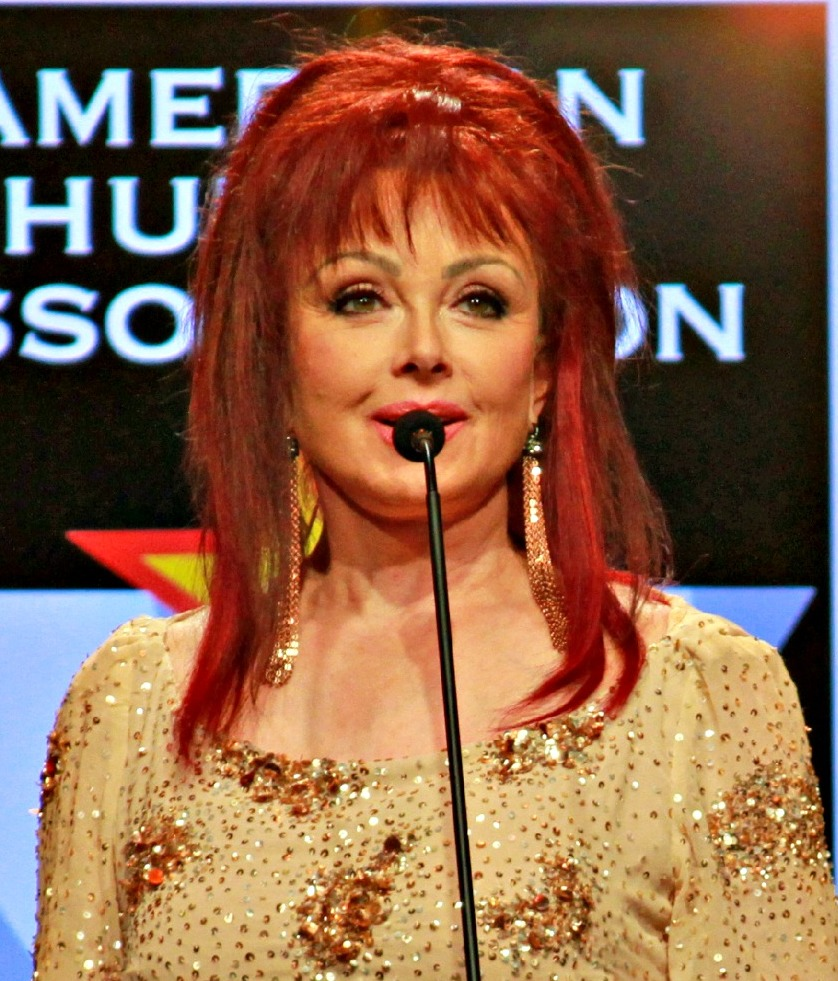
Naomi Judd

- April 1
  - C. W. McCall, 93, country singer ("Convoy") and politician, mayor of Ouray, Colorado (1986–1992) (b. 1928)
  - Eleanor Munro, 94, art critic, historian and writer (b. 1928)
  - Jerrold B. Tunnell, 71, mathematician (b. 1950)
  - Roland White, 83, bluegrass musician (b. 1938)
  - Eleanor Whittemore, 95, politician, member of the New Hampshire House of Representatives (1983–1985) (b. 1926)
- April 2
  - Estelle Harris, 93 actress (Seinfeld, Toy Story) (b. 1928)
  - Joseph A. Diclerico Jr., 81, jurist, judge (since 1992) and chief judge (1992–1997) for the U.S. District Court for New Hampshire (b. 1941)
  - Gerald Schreck, 83, sailor, Olympic champion (1968) (b. 1939)
- April 3
  - Tommy Davis, 83, baseball player (Los Angeles Dodgers, Baltimore Orioles, Oakland Athletics) and coach, World Series champion (1963) (b. 1939)
  - William S. Horne, 85, politician, member of the Maryland House of Delegates (1973–1989) (b. 1936)
  - Bruce Johnson, 71, news anchor and reporter (WUSA) (b. 1950)
  - Gerda Weissmann Klein, 97, Polish-born writer and human rights activist (b. 1924)
  - David G. Mason, 79, politician, member of the Kentucky House of Representatives (1974–1977) (b. 1942–1943)
  - Donn B. Murphy, 91, theatre and speech teacher (Georgetown University) and theatrical advisor (b. 1930)
  - Stan Parrish, 75, football coach (Tampa Bay Buccaneers, Ball State Cardinals, Michigan Wolverines) (b. 1946)
  - Gene Shue, 90, basketball player (Fort Wayne/Detroit Pistons, New York Knicks) and coach (Baltimore/Washington Bullets) (b. 1931)
- April 4
  - Donald Baechler, 65, painter and sculptor (b. 1956)
  - Eric Boehlert, 57, media critic and writer (Salon, Rolling Stone, Billboard) (b. 1965)
  - Madeline Cain, 72, politician, member of the Ohio House of Representatives (1989–1995) and mayor of Lakewood, Ohio (1996–2003) (b. 1949)
  - Kathy Lamkin, 74, actress (No Country for Old Men, The Texas Chainsaw Massacre, The Astronaut Farmer) (b. 1947)
  - Joe Messina, 93, Hall of Fame guitarist (The Funk Brothers) (b. 1928)
  - James Reilly, 77, politician, member of the Illinois House of Representatives (1977–1983) (b. 1945)
  - Vernon Scoville, 68, politician, member of the Missouri House of Representatives (1983–1991) (b. 1953)
  - Herb Turetzky, 76, basketball official scorer (Brooklyn Nets) (b. 1945)
  - Jerry Uelsmann, 87, photographer (b. 1934)
- April 5
  - Sidney Altman, 82, Canadian-born molecular biologist, Nobel Prize laureate (1989) (b. 1939)
  - John Ellis, 73, baseball player (New York Yankees, Cleveland Indians, Texas Rangers) (b. 1948)
  - Nehemiah Persoff, 102, actor (Some Like It Hot, An American Tail, Yentl) (b. 1919)
  - Lee Rose, 85, college basketball coach (Charlotte 49ers, Purdue Boilermakers, South Florida Bulls) (b. 1936)
  - Bobby Rydell, 79, singer ("Wild One", "Wildwood Days") and actor (Bye Bye Birdie) (b. 1942)
  - Paul Siebel, 84, singer-songwriter (b. 1937)
  - Doug Sutherland, 73, football player (Minnesota Vikings, Seattle Seahawks) (b. 1948)
- April 6
  - Rae Allen, 95, actress (And Miss Reardon Drinks a Little, A League of Their Own, Stargate), Tony winner (1971) (b. 1926)
  - Mark Conover, 61, Olympic runner (b. 1960)
- April 7
  - Eileen Grant McGeoghegan, 68, politician, member of the Missouri House of Representatives (1983–1991) (b. 1953)
  - Michael Neidorff, 79, business executive, CEO of Centene Corporation (since 1996) (b. 1943)
  - Arliss Sturgulewski, 94, politician, member of the Alaska Senate (1979–1993) (b. 1927)
  - Rayfield Wright, 76, Hall of Fame football player (Dallas Cowboys), Super Bowl champion (1971, 1977) (b. 1945)
- April 8
  - Edwin Kantar, 89, bridge player (b. 1932)
  - Alexander Vovin, 61, Russian-born linguist, philologist, and Japanologist (b. 1961)
- April 9
  - Jim Bronstad, 85, baseball player (Washington Senators, New York Yankees) (b. 1936)
  - Ann Hutchinson Guest, 103, dance notator (b. 1918)
  - Dwayne Haskins, 24, football player (Pittsburgh Steelers, Washington Football Team) (b. 1997)
  - Dick Swatland, 76, football player (Houston Oilers, Bridgeport Jets) (b. 1945)
- April 10
  - Gary Barrett, 82, ecologist (b. 1942)
  - Gary Brown, 52, football player (Houston Oilers, New York Giants, San Diego Chargers) and coach (b. 1969)
  - John Drew, 67, basketball player (Atlanta Hawks, Utah Jazz) (b. 1954)
  - Katherine Rogers, 67, politician, member of the New Hampshire House of Representatives (2012–2022) (b. 1955).
- April 11
  - Wayne Cooper, 65, basketball player (Portland Trail Blazers, Denver Nuggets, Golden State Warriors) (b. 1956)
  - Joe Horlen, 84, baseball player (Chicago White Sox, Oakland Athletics), World Series champion (1972) (b. 1937)
  - Charnett Moffett, 54, jazz bassist (b. 1967)
  - Chip Myrtle, 76, football player (Denver Broncos) (b. 1945)
- April 12
  - Gilbert Gottfried, 67, actor (Aladdin, Beverly Hills Cop II, Cyberchase) and comedian (b. 1955)
  - Cedric McMillan, 44, bodybuilder (b. 1977)
  - Charles P. Roland, 104, historian (b. 1918)
  - Shirley Spork, 94, golfer and co-founder of the LPGA Tour (b. 1927)
- April 13
  - Tim Feerick, 33, rock bassist (Dance Gavin Dance) (b. 1988–1989)
  - Laura Harris Hales, 54, writer, historian, and podcaster (b. 1967)
  - Alvin Walker, 67, football player (Ottawa Rough Riders, Montreal Alouettes) (b. 1954)
- April 14
  - Dennis Byars, 81, politician, member of the Nebraska Legislature (1988–1995, 1999–2007) (b. 1940)
  - Rio Hackford, 52, actor (Treme, Jonah Hex, The Mandalorian) (b. 1970)
  - Pat Newman, 81, tennis coach (b. 1941)
- April 15
  - Bob Chinn, 99, restaurateur (b. 1923)
  - Andy Coen, 57, college football coach (Lehigh Mountain Hawks) (b. 1964)
  - Earl Devaney, 74, police officer, inspector-general of the interior department (1999–2011) (b. 1947)
  - Ed Jasper, 49, football player (Atlanta Falcons, Philadelphia Eagles, Oakland Raiders) (b. 1973)
  - Art Rupe, 104, Hall of Fame music executive and record producer (Specialty Records) (b. 1917)
  - Liz Sheridan, 93, actress (Seinfeld, ALF, Play the Game) (b. 1929)
- April 16
  - John Dougherty, 89, Roman Catholic prelate, auxiliary bishop of Scranton (1995–2009) (b. 1932)
  - Jon Wefald, 84, academic administrator, president of Kansas State University (1986–2009) (b. 1937)
  - Zippy Chippy, 30, thoroughbred racehorse (b. 1991)
- April 17
  - Ursula Bellugi, 91, German-born cognitive neuroscientist (b. 1931)
  - Roderick "Pooh" Clark, 49, R&B singer (Hi-Five) (b. 1972–1973)
  - DJ Kay Slay, 55, disc jockey and record executive (b. 1966)
  - Midnight Bourbon, 4, thoroughbred racehorse (b. 2018)
  - Hollis Resnik, 67, singer and actress (Backdraft) (b. 1955)
  - Rick Turner, 78, luthier (b. 1943)
- April 18
  - Nicholas Angelich, 51, classical pianist (b. 1970)
  - Bill Gatton, 89, entrepreneur and philanthropist (b. 1932)
  - Sid Mark, 88, radio presenter (b. 1933)
- April 19
  - Brad Ashford, 72, politician, member of the U.S. House of Representatives (2015–2017) (b. 1949)
  - Garland Boyette, 82, football player (Houston Oilers, St. Louis Cardinals, Montreal Alouettes) (b. 1940)
  - Umang Gupta, 72, Indian-born entrepreneur (b. 1949)
- April 20
  - Philip Beidler, 77, writer (b. 1944)
  - Barbara French, 95, politician, member of the New Hampshire House of Representatives (b. 1926)
  - Guitar Shorty, 87, blues musician (b. 1934)
  - Ralph Kiser, 56, reality television personality (Survivor) (b. 1965–1966)
  - Robert Morse, 90, actor (How to Succeed in Business Without Really Trying, Where Were You When the Lights Went Out?, Mad Men), Tony winner (1962, 1990) (b. 1934)
- April 21
  - Carl Wayne Buntion, 78, convicted murderer (b. 1944)
  - John DiStaso, 68, journalist (New Hampshire Union Leader, WMUR-TV) (b. 1953/1954)
  - Daryle Lamonica, 80, football player (Oakland Raiders, Buffalo Bills, Southern California Sun) (b. 1941)
  - Cynthia Plaster Caster, 74, visual artist (b. 1947)
- April 22
  - Dennis J. Gallagher, 82, politician, member of the Colorado House of Representatives (1970–1974), Senate (1974–1994), and Denver City Council (1995–2014) (b. 1939)
  - Ted Prappas, 66, racing driver (CART) (b. 1955)
  - Clayton Weishuhn, 62, football player (New England Patriots, Green Bay Packers), traffic collision (b. 1959)
- April 23
  - Justin Green, 76, cartoonist (Binky Brown Meets the Holy Virgin Mary) (b. 1945)
  - Enoch Kelly Haney, 81, politician, member of the Oklahoma House of Representatives (1980–1986) and Senate (1986–2002) (b. 1940)
  - Orrin Hatch, 88, politician, member of the U.S. Senate (1977–2019), Dean of the Senate (2013–2019) (b. 1934)
  - Johnnie Jones, 102, civil rights activist and politician, member of the Louisiana House of Representatives (1972–1976) (b. 1919)
  - Kenneth E. Stumpf, 77, US Army soldier and Medal of Honor recipient (b. 1944)
- April 24
  - James Bama, 95, artist and book cover illustrator (Doc Savage) (b. 1926)
  - McCrae Dowless, 66, political campaigner (b. 1956)
  - Richie Moran, 85, lacrosse player and coach (Cornell Big Red) (b. 1937)
  - John Stofa, 79, football player (Miami Dolphins) (b. 1942)
  - Ronald R. Van Stockum, 105, Marine Corps brigadier general (b. 1916)
- April 25
  - J. Roy Rowland, 96, politician, member of the U.S. House of Representatives (1983–1995) and Georgia House of Representatives (1976–1982) (b. 1926)
  - Andrew Woolfolk, 71, Hall of Fame saxophonist (Earth, Wind & Fire) (b. 1950)
- April 26
  - Luke Allen, 43, baseball player (Los Angeles Dodgers, Colorado Rockies) (b. 1978)
  - Daniel Dolan, 70, Catholic sedevacantist bishop (since 1993) (b. 1951)
  - Randy Rand, 62, hard rock bassist (Autograph) (b. 1959–1960)
- April 27
  - David Birney, 83, actor (St. Elsewhere, Bridget Loves Bernie, Oh, God! Book II) and stage director (b. 1939)
  - Bob Elkins, 89, actor (Coal Miner's Daughter, The Dream Catcher) (b. 1932)
  - Judy Henske, 85, folk singer ("High Flying Bird") (b. 1936)
  - Rich Pahls, 78, politician, member of the Nebraska Legislature (2005–2013, since 2021) and Omaha City Council (2013–2021) (b. 1943)
- April 28
  - Neal Adams, 80, comic book artist (Batman, Superman vs. Muhammad Ali, Green Lantern) (b. 1941)
  - Harold Livingston, 97, novelist and screenwriter (Star Trek: The Motion Picture, The Hell with Heroes) (b. 1924)
  - Steve McMillan, 80, politician, member of the Alabama House of Representatives (since 1980) (b. 1941)
- April 29
  - Joanna Barnes, 87, actress (Auntie Mame, Spartacus, The Parent Trap) and writer (b. 1934)
  - Georgia Benkart, 72–73, mathematician (b. 1949)
  - Allen Blairman, 81, jazz drummer (b. 1940)
- April 30
  - Allister Adel, 45, lawyer, county attorney of Maricopa County, Arizona (2019–2022) (b. 1976)
  - Frank J. Anderson, 83–84, police officer, sheriff of Marion County, Indiana (2003–2011) (b. 1938)
  - Ron Galella, 91, paparazzo (b. 1931)
  - Naomi Judd, 76, country singer (The Judds) (b. 1946)
  - Bob Krueger, 86, diplomat and politician, member of the U.S. House of Representatives (1975–1979) and Senate (1993), ambassador to Botswana (1996–1999) (b. 1935)
  - Gabe Serbian, 45, hardcore punk musician (The Locust, Dead Cross) (b. 1976)

== May ==
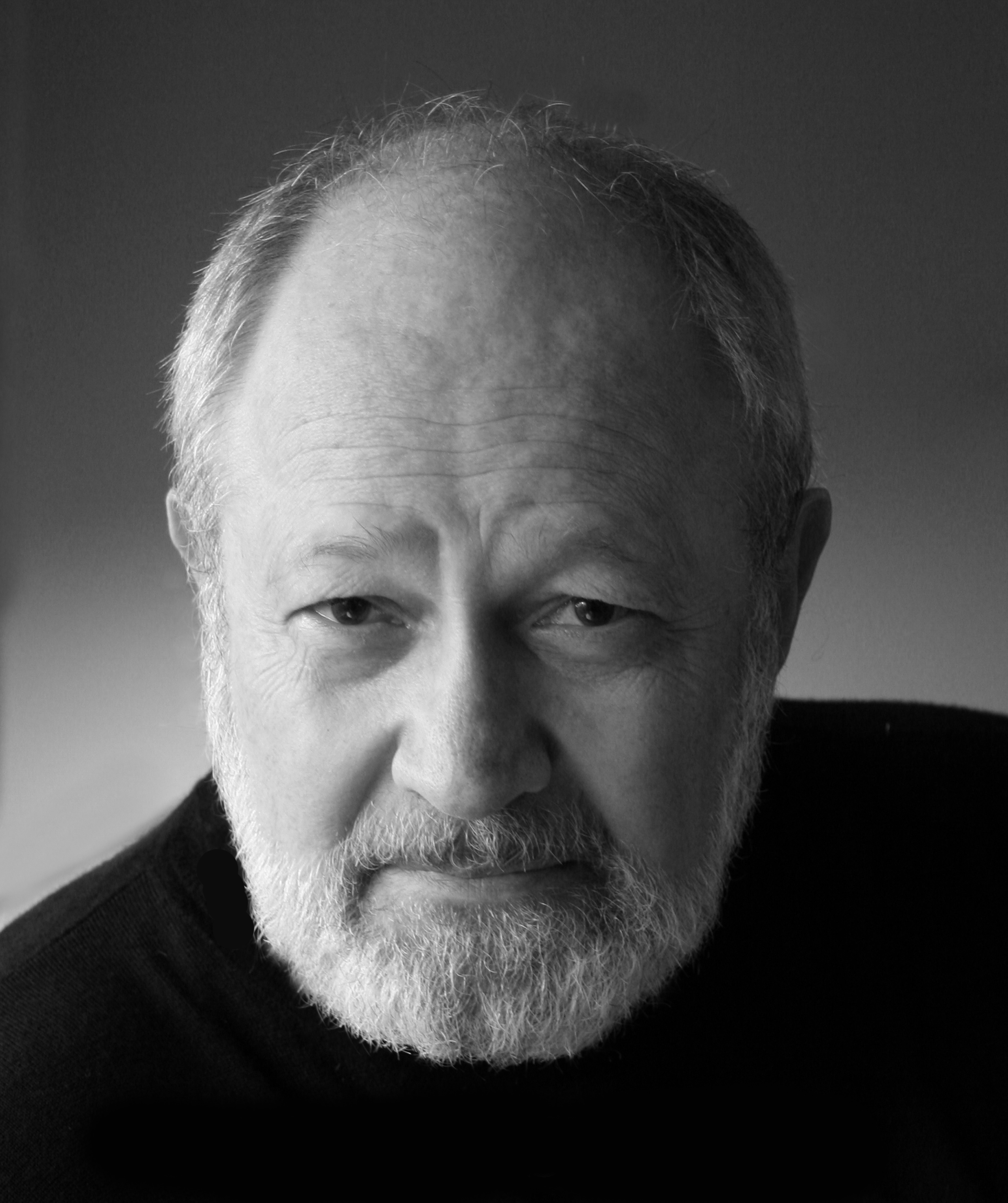
Charles Siebert

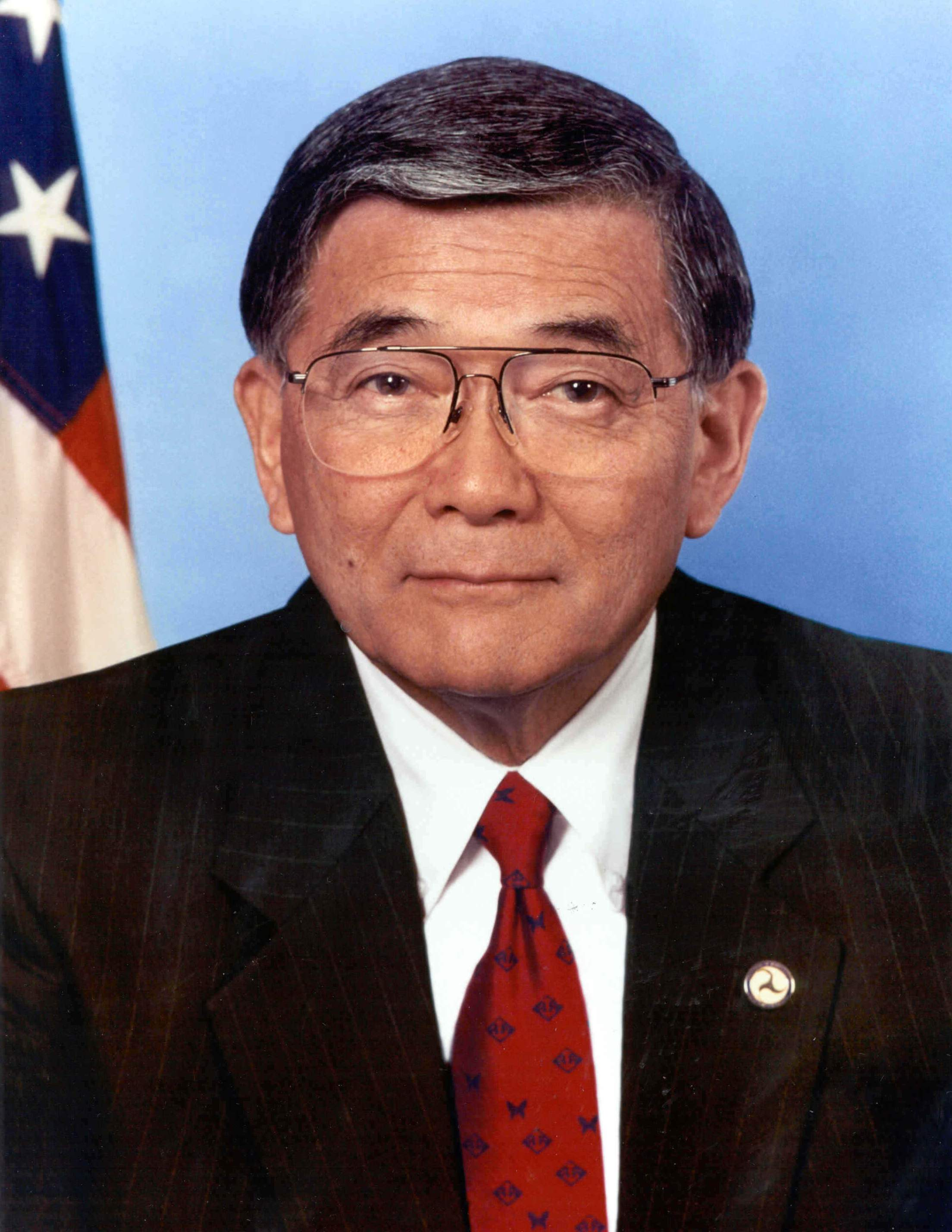
Norman Mineta

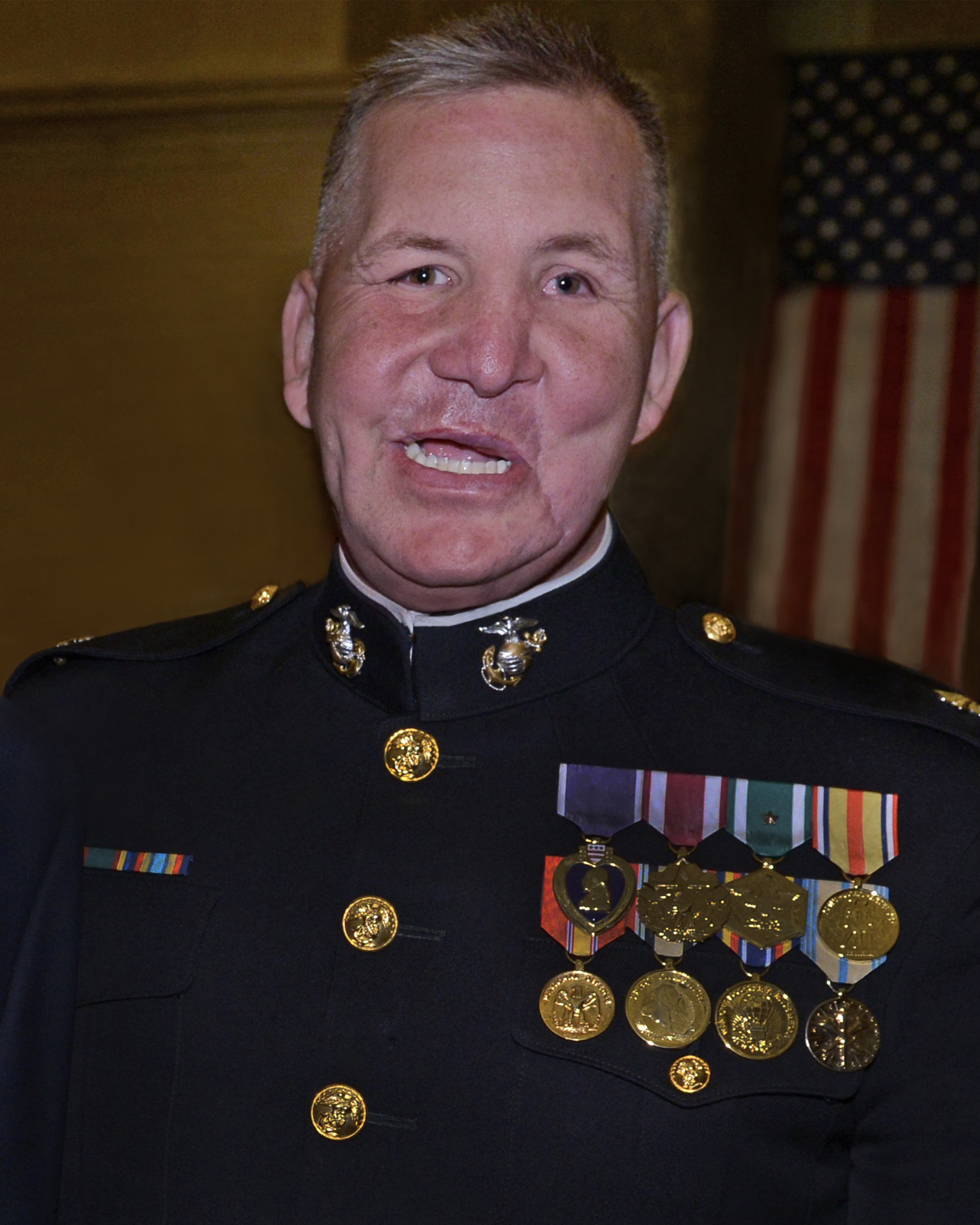
Justin Constantine

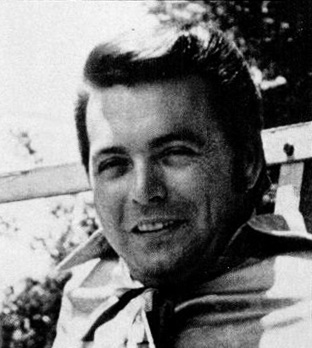
Mickey Gilley

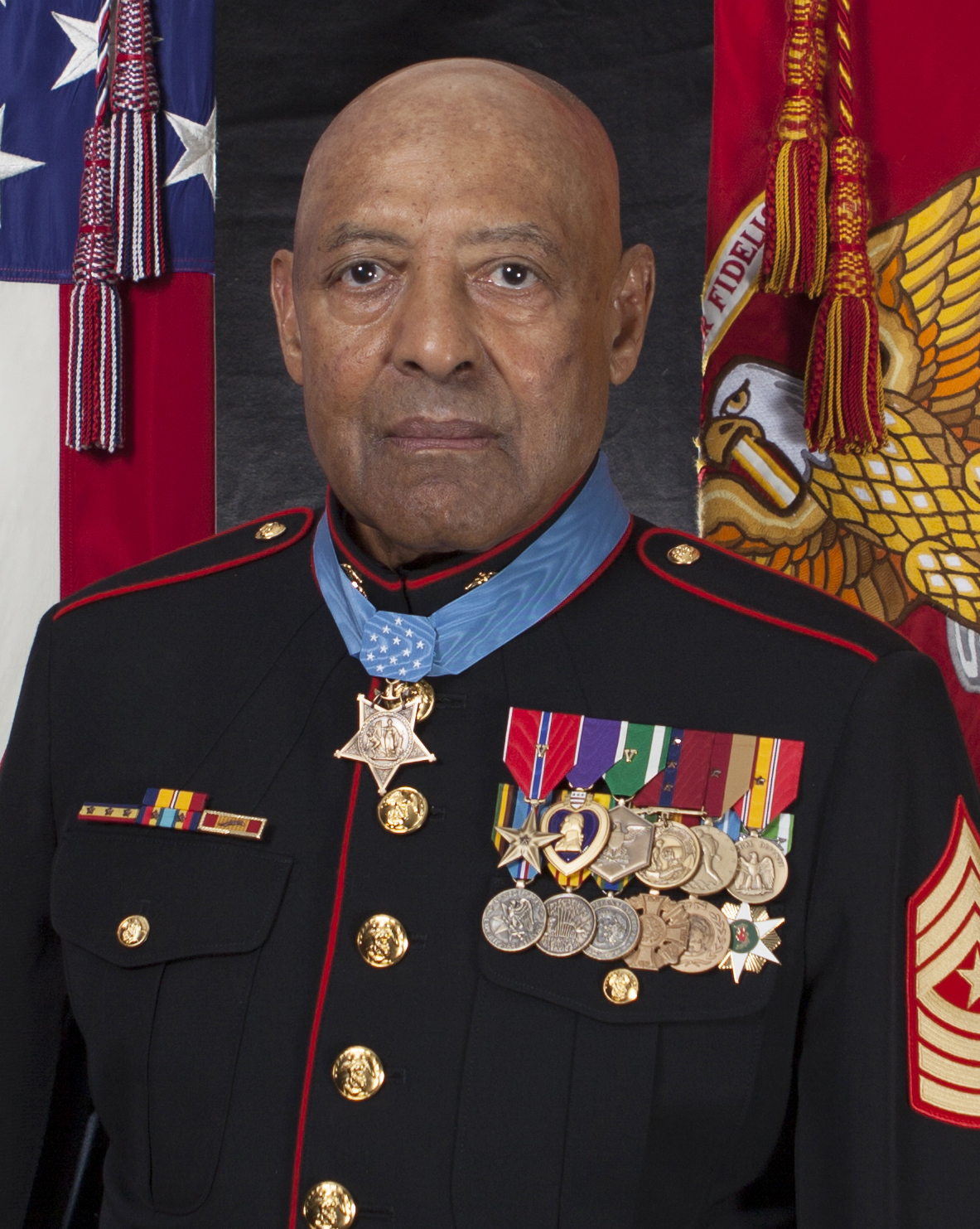
John L. Canley

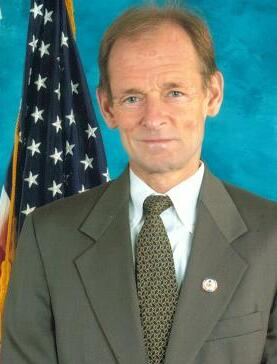
Tim Johnson

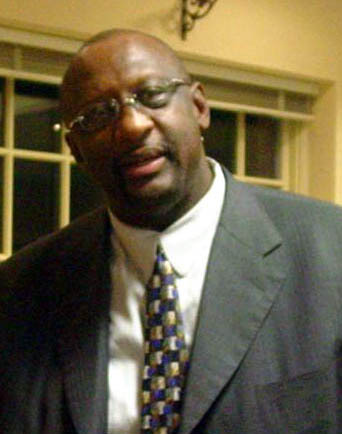
Bob Lanier

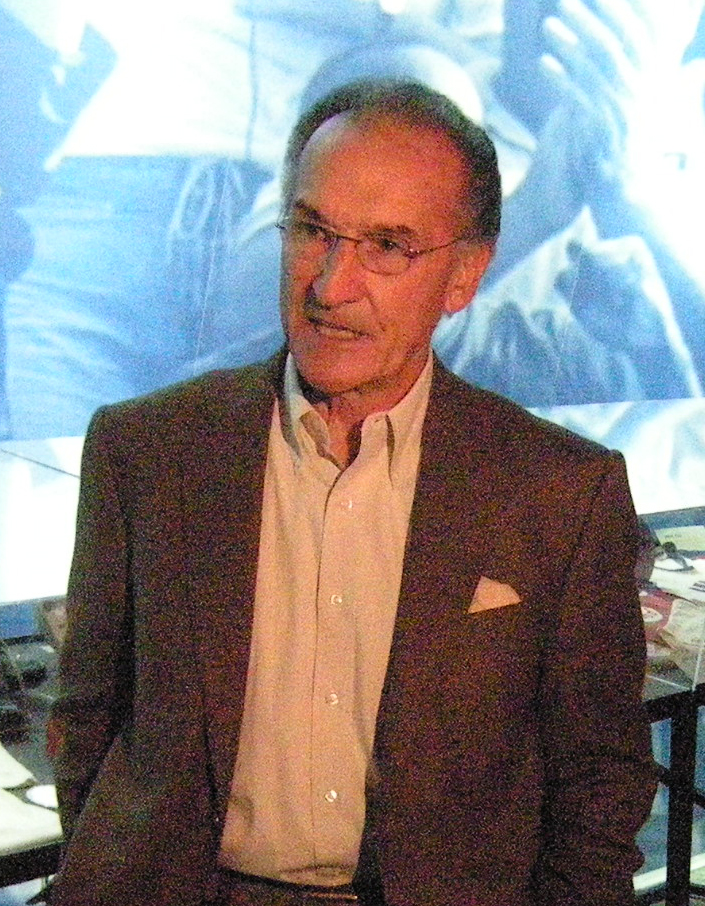
Gino Cappelletti

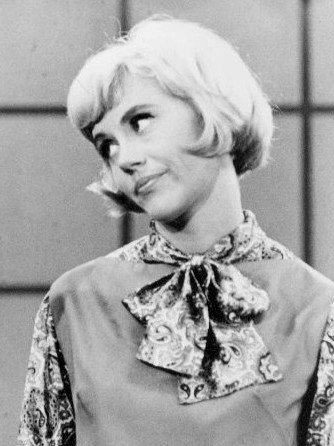
Maggie Peterson

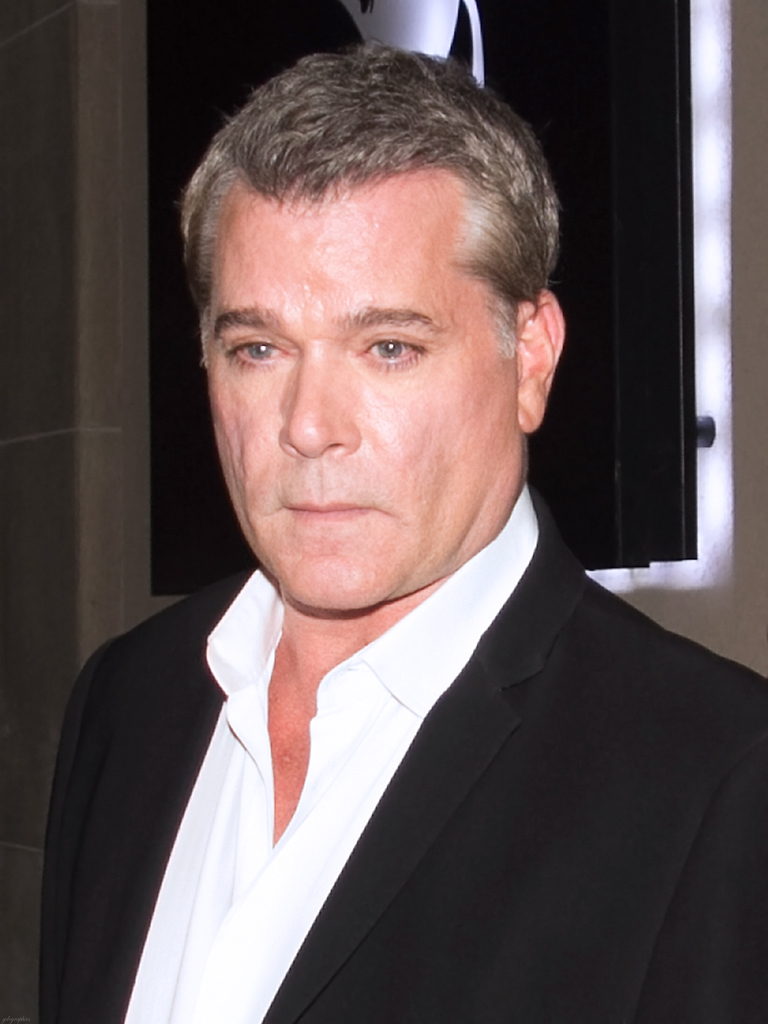
Ray Liotta

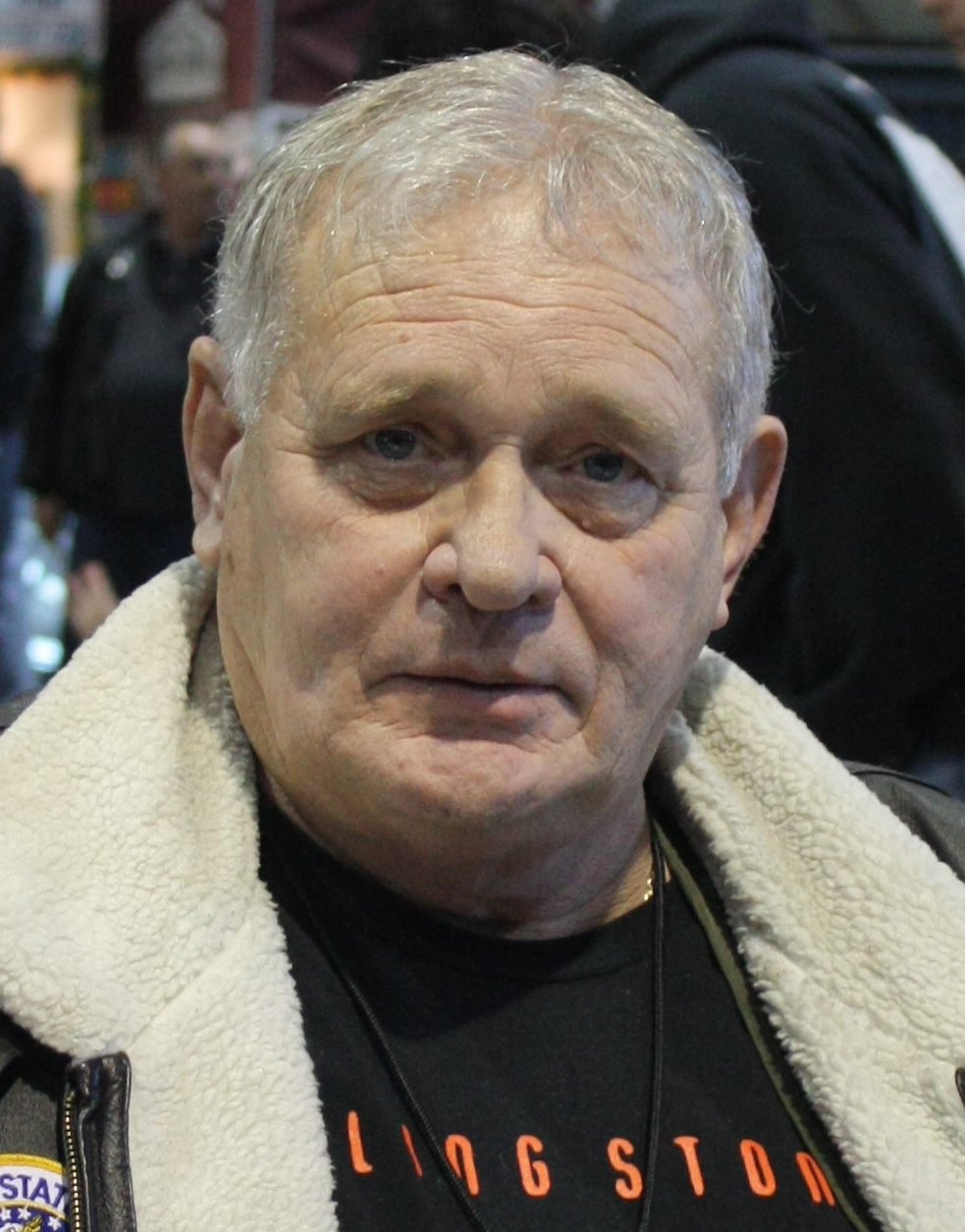
Bo Hopkins

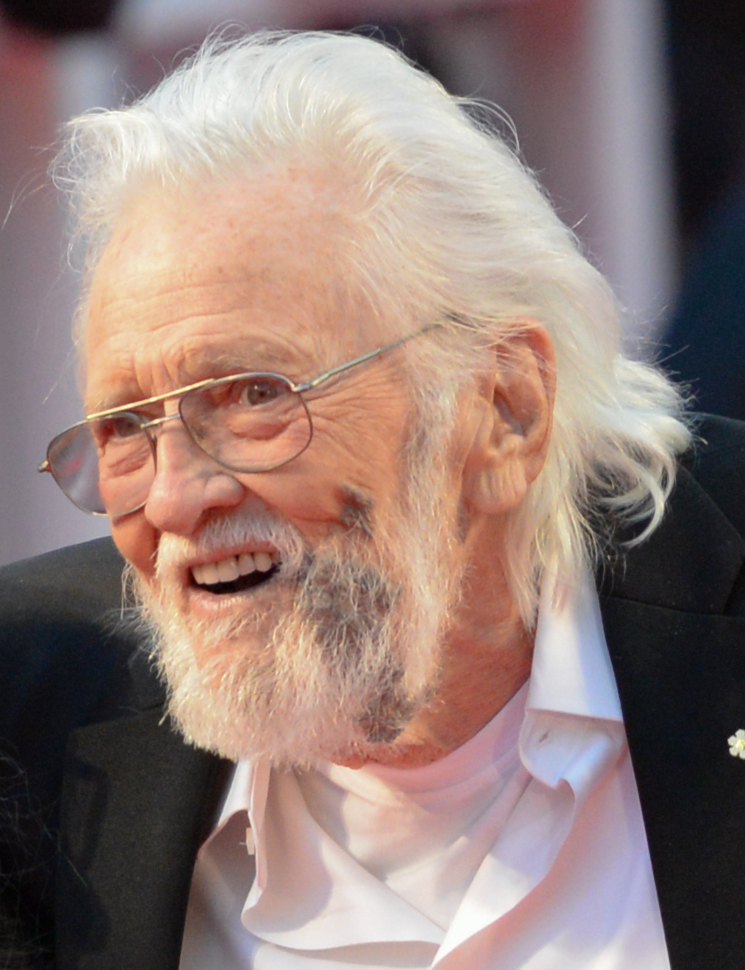
Ronnie Hawkins

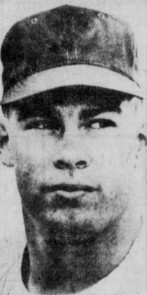
Costen Shockley

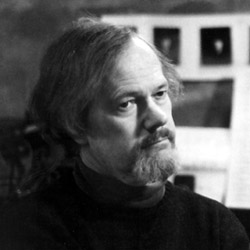
Ingram Marshall

- May 1
  - Millie Bailey, 104, World War II veteran (WAC) and civil servant (b. 1918)
  - Kathy Boudin, 78, political activist (Weather Underground) and convicted murderer (1981 Brink's robbery) (b. 1943)
  - Mike Liles, 76, politician, member of the Tennessee House of Representatives (1991–1995) (b. 1945)
  - Henry Coke Morgan Jr., 87, federal judge, Eastern District of Virginia (since 1992) (b. 1935)
  - Charles Siebert, 84, actor (Trapper John, M.D., ...And Justice for All, One Day at a Time) (b. 1938)
  - Sally Siegrist, 70, politician, member of the Indiana House of Representatives (2016–2018) (b. 1951)
  - Jerry verDorn, 72, actor (One Life to Live, Guiding Light) (b. 1949)
- May 2
  - Kailia Posey, 16, beauty pageant contestant and reality show contestant (Toddlers & Tiaras) (b. 2006)
  - Rob Stein, 78, political strategist (b. 1943)
- May 3
  - Carman L. Deck, 56, convicted murderer (b. 1965)
  - Andra Martin, 86, actress (Up Periscope, The Thing That Couldn't Die, Yellowstone Kelly) (b. 1935)
  - Norman Mineta, 90, politician, member of the U.S. House of Representatives (1975–1995), secretary of commerce (2000–2001) and transportation (2001–2006), mayor of San Jose (1971–1975) (b. 1931)
  - Tim Shaffer, 76, politician, member of the Pennsylvania State Senate (1981–1996) (b. 1945)
  - Bert Weaver, 90, golfer (b. 1932)
- May 4
  - Herschella Horton, 83, politician, member of the Arizona House of Representatives (1991–2001) (b. 1938)
  - Kenny Moore, 78, Olympic runner (1968, 1972) (b. 1943)
  - Howie Pyro, 61, punk bassist (D Generation) (b. 1960)
- May 5
  - Justin Constantine, Marine Corp lieutenant colonel
  - Du'Vonta Lampkin, 25, football player (Tennessee Titans, Massachusetts Pirates) (b. 1997)
  - Faye Marlowe, 95, actress (Hangover Square, Junior Miss, The Spider) (b. 1926)
  - Kevin Samuels, 57, YouTuber (b. 1965)
- May 6
  - Helen Kleberg Groves, 94, rancher (b. 1927)
  - Mike Hagerty, 67, actor (Friends, Somebody Somewhere) (b. 1954)
  - Jewell, 53, R&B singer (Death Row Records) (b. 1968)
  - Bill Laskey, 79, football player (Oakland Raiders, Baltimore Colts, Denver Broncos) (b. 1943)
  - Patricia A. McKillip, 74, author (The Forgotten Beasts of Eld, Harpist in the Wind, Ombria in Shadow) (b. 1948)
  - George Pérez, 67, comic book artist (The Avengers, Crisis on Infinite Earths, Teen Titans) and writer (b. 1954)
  - Mark Sweeney, 62, politician, member of the Montana Senate (since 2021) (b. 1959–1960)
- May 7
  - Suzi Gablik, 87, artist, author and art critic (b. 1934)
  - Mickey Gilley, 86, singer ("Room Full of Roses", "Don't the Girls All Get Prettier at Closing Time", "Stand by Me") (b. 1936)
  - Jack Kehler, 75, actor (The Big Lebowski, Men in Black II, Fever Pitch) (b. 1946)
  - Bruce MacVittie, 65, actor (Million Dollar Baby, The Sopranos, American Buffalo) (b. 1956)
  - Francis J. Meehan, 98, diplomat (b. 1924)
  - Elvin Papik, 95, college football coach (Doane) and administrator (b. 1926)
  - Bob Romanik, 72, radio host (b. 1949–1950)
- May 8
  - John R. Cherry III, 73, film director and screenwriter (Ernest Saves Christmas, Ernest Scared Stupid, Ernest Goes to Jail) (b. 1948)
  - Harry Dornbrand, 99, aerospace engineer (b. 1922)
  - Ray Scott, 88, angler, founder of the Bass Anglers Sportsman Society (b. 1933)
  - Fred Ward, 79, actor (Escape from Alcatraz, The Right Stuff, Tremors) (b. 1942)
- May 9
  - Robert Brom, 83, Roman Catholic prelate, bishop of Duluth (1983–1989) and San Diego (1990–2013) (b. 1938)
  - John L. Canley, 84, Marine Corp Gunnery Sergeant, Medal of Honor recipient (b. 1938)
  - Midge Decter, 94, non-fiction writer (b. 1927)
  - Tim Johnson, 75, politician, member of the U.S. House of Representatives (2001–2013) and the Illinois House of Representatives (1977–2001) (b. 1946)
  - John Leo, 86, journalist (The New York Times) (b. 1935)
  - Adreian Payne, 31, basketball player (Atlanta Hawks, Minnesota Timberwolves, Juventas Utina) (b. 1991)
- May 10
  - Walter Hirsch, 92, basketball player (Kentucky Wildcats) (b. 1929)
  - Bob Lanier, 73, Hall of Fame basketball player (Detroit Pistons, Milwaukee Bucks) and coach (Golden State Warriors) (b. 1948)
  - Karl Van Roy, 83, politician, member of the Wisconsin State Assembly (2003–2013) (b. 1938)
- May 11
  - Shireen Abu Akleh, 51, Palestinian-born journalist (Al Jazeera) (b. 1971)
  - Clarence Dixon, 66, convicted murderer (b. 1955)
  - Marilyn Fogel, 69, geo-ecologist (b. 1952)
  - Trevor Strnad, 41, musician (The Black Dahlia Murder) (b 1981)
  - Randy Weaver, 74, survivalist (Ruby Ridge) (b. 1948)
- May 12
  - Gino Cappelletti, 89, football player (Boston Patriots) (b. 1933)
  - Larry Holley, 76, college basketball coach (William Jewell Cardinals, Central Methodist Eagles, Northwest Missouri State Bearcats) (b. 1945)
  - Robert McFarlane, 84, lieutenant colonel and politician, national security advisor (1983–1985) (b. 1937)
- May 13
  - Bob Ciaffone, 81, poker player and author (b. 1940)
  - Lil Keed, 24, rapper (b. 1998)
  - Ben Roy Mottelson, 95, American-born Danish nuclear physicist, Nobel laureate (1975) (b. 1926)
  - Ed Rynders, 62, politician, member of the Georgia House of Representatives (2003–2019) (b. 1960)
  - Richard Wald, 92, television executive (NBC News, ABC News) and journalist (New York Herald Tribune) (b. 1930)
- May 14
  - Peter Nicholas, 80, businessman (Boston Scientific) (b. 1940–1941)
  - Arthur Shurlock, 84, Olympic gymnast (1964) (b. 1937)
  - Urvashi Vaid, 63, Indian-born LGBT activist (b. 1958)
  - David West, 57, baseball player (Minnesota Twins, Philadelphia Phillies, New York Mets) (b. 1964)
- May 15
  - Jim Ferlo, 70, politician, member of the Pennsylvania Senate (2003–2015) (b. 1951)
  - Knox Martin, 99, Colombian-born painter and sculptor (b. 1923)
  - Maggie Peterson, 81, actress (The Andy Griffith Show, The Bill Dana Show) and location manager (Casino) (b. 1941)
- May 16
  - John Aylward, 75, actor (ER, The West Wing, A Million Ways to Die in the West) (b. 1946)
  - William N. Dunn, 83, international relations scholar (b. 1938)
  - Hilarion, 74, Canadian-born First Hierarch of the ROCOR (b. 1948)
  - Sidney Kramer, 96, politician, member of the Maryland Senate (1978–1986) (b. 1925)
  - Epaminondas Stassinopoulos, 101, German-born astrophysicist, writer and World War II resistance member (b. 1921)
- May 17
  - Kristine Gebbie, 78, academic White House AIDS policy coordinator (1993–1994) (b. 1943)
  - Marnie Schulenburg, 37, actress (As the World Turns, One Life to Live, Tainted Dreams) (b. 1984)
- May 18
  - Larry Lacewell, 85, football player (Arkansas–Monticello Boll Weevils), coach (Arkansas State Indians) and scouting director (Dallas Cowboys) (b. 1937)
  - Bob Neuwirth, 82, singer-songwriter ("Mercedes Benz") (b. 1939)
- May 19
  - Sam Smith, 78, basketball player (Kentucky Colonels) (b. 1944)
  - Bernard Wright, 58, funk and jazz singer ("Who Do You Love") (b. 1963)
- May 20
  - Roger Angell, 101, sportswriter and author (Season Ticket: A Baseball Companion) (b. 1921)
  - Jeffrey Escoffier, 79, author and activist (b. 1942)
  - Glenn Hackney, 97, politician, member of the Alaska House of Representatives (1973–1977) and Senate (1977–1981) (b. 1924)
  - Calvin Magee, 59, football player (Tampa Bay Buccaneers) and coach (Arizona Wildcats, West Virginia Mountaineers) (b. 1963)
  - Domina Eberle Spencer, 101, mathematician (b. 1920)
  - Bruce Tabb, 95, American-born New Zealand accountancy academic (b. 1927)
- May 21
  - Colin Cantwell, 89–90, film concept artist (2001: A Space Odyssey, Star Wars, WarGames) (b. 1932)
  - Peter Koper, 75, German-born journalist, screenwriter (Headless Body in Topless Bar, Island of the Dead) and producer (b. 1947)
  - Rosemary Radford Ruether, 85, feminist theologian (b. 1936)
  - Emil Aloysius Wcela, 91, Roman Catholic prelate, auxiliary bishop of Rockville Centre (1988–2007) (b. 1931)
  - Gordie Windhorn, 88, baseball player (New York Yankees) (b. 1933)
- May 22
  - Hazel Henderson, 89, British-American futurist and economist (b. 1933)
  - Lee Lawson, 80, actress (Guiding Light, One Life to Live, Love of Life) (b. 1941)
  - John M. Merriman, 75, historian (b. 1946)
  - Peter Lamborn Wilson, 76–77, anarchist author and poet (Temporary Autonomous Zone) (b. 1945)
- May 23
  - Thom Bresh, 74, country guitarist and singer (b. 1948)
  - Kathleen Lavoie, 72, microbiologist and explorer (b. 1949)
  - Joe Pignatano, 92, baseball player (Los Angeles Dodgers, Kansas City Athletics) and coach (New York Mets), World Series champion (1959) (b. 1929)
- May 24
  - David Datuna, 48, Georgian-born American artist. (b. 1974)
  - Bob Miller, 86, baseball player (Detroit Tigers, Cincinnati Reds, New York Mets) (b. 1935)
  - John Thompson, 95, football executive (Minnesota Vikings, Seattle Seahawks) (b. 1927)
- May 25
  - Toby Berger, 81, information theorist (b. 1940)
  - Morton L. Janklow, 91, literary agent (b. 1930)
  - Jack Kaiser, 95, coach (Oneonta Red Sox, Roanoke Red Sox) and athletic administrator (St. John's Red Storm) (b. 1926)
  - Thomas Murphy, 96, broadcasting executive (ABC) (b. 1925)
  - Gary Nelson, 87, film director (Murder in Three Acts, The Pride of Jesse Hallam, Molly and Lawless John) (b. 1927)
  - Pinchas Stolper, 90, Orthodox rabbi (b. 1931)
- May 26
  - Richard D. Johnson, 87, accountant, Iowa State Auditor (1979–2003) (b. 1935)
  - Ray Liotta, 67, American actor (Goodfellas, Something Wild, Field of Dreams), Emmy winner (2005) (b. 1954)
  - Phillip Ritzenberg, 90, journalist (New York Daily News, The Jewish Week) (b. 1931)
  - George Shapiro, 91, American talent manager (Carl Reiner, Andy Kaufman) and television producer (Seinfeld) (b. 1931)
  - Bill Walker, 95, Australian-born composer and conductor (b. 1927)
  - Jan Zaprudnik, 95, Belarusian-American historian and publicist (b. 1926)
- May 27
  - Don Goldstein, 84, college basketball player (Louisville Cardinals), Pan American Games gold medalist (1959) (b. 1937)
  - Arlene Kotil, 88, baseball player (All-American Girls Professional Baseball League) (b. 1934)
  - Samella Lewis, 99, visual artist and art historian (b. 1923)
  - Twyla Ring, 84, politician, member of the Minnesota Senate (1999–2002) (b. 1937)
  - Fayez Sarofim, 93, Egyptian-American billionaire and sports team minority owner (Houston Texans) (b. 1929)
- May 28
  - Walter Abish, 90, Austrian-born author (Alphabetical Africa, How German Is It) (b. 1931)
  - Bo Hopkins, 84, actor (The Wild Bunch, American Graffiti, Midnight Express) (b. 1938)
- May 29
  - Ronnie Hawkins, 87, American-born Canadian rock and roll musician (b. 1935)
  - Joel Moses, 80, Israeli-American mathematician and computer scientist (b. 1941)
  - Sarah Ramsey, 83, thoroughbred horse breeder (b. 1939)
  - Alden Roche, 77, football player (Denver Broncos, Green Bay Packers, Seattle Seahawks) (b. 1945)
  - Kasia Al Thani, 45, American-born Qatari royal (b. 1976)
- May 30
  - Jeff Gladney, 25, football player (Minnesota Vikings, TCU Horned Frogs) (b. 1996)
  - William Lucas, 93, politician, sheriff (1969–1983) and executive (1983–1987) of Wayne County, Michigan (b. 1929)
  - Charles A. Rose, 91, politician, mayor of Chattanooga (1975–1983) (b. 1930)
  - Costen Shockley, 80, baseball player (Philadelphia Phillies, Los Angeles Angels) (b. 1942)
  - Sean Thackrey, 79, winemaker (b. 1942)
  - Paul Vance, 92, songwriter and record producer (b. 1929)
- May 31
  - Paul Brass, 85, political scientist and academic (b. 1936)
  - Bart Bryant, 59, golfer (b. 1962)
  - Marvin Josephson, 95, talent manager, founder of ICM Partners (b. 1927)
  - Ingram Marshall, 80, composer (b. 1942)
  - Kelly Joe Phelps, 62, blues musician (b. 1959)
  - Dave Smith, 71–72, sound engineer, founder of Sequential (b. 1950)

== June ==
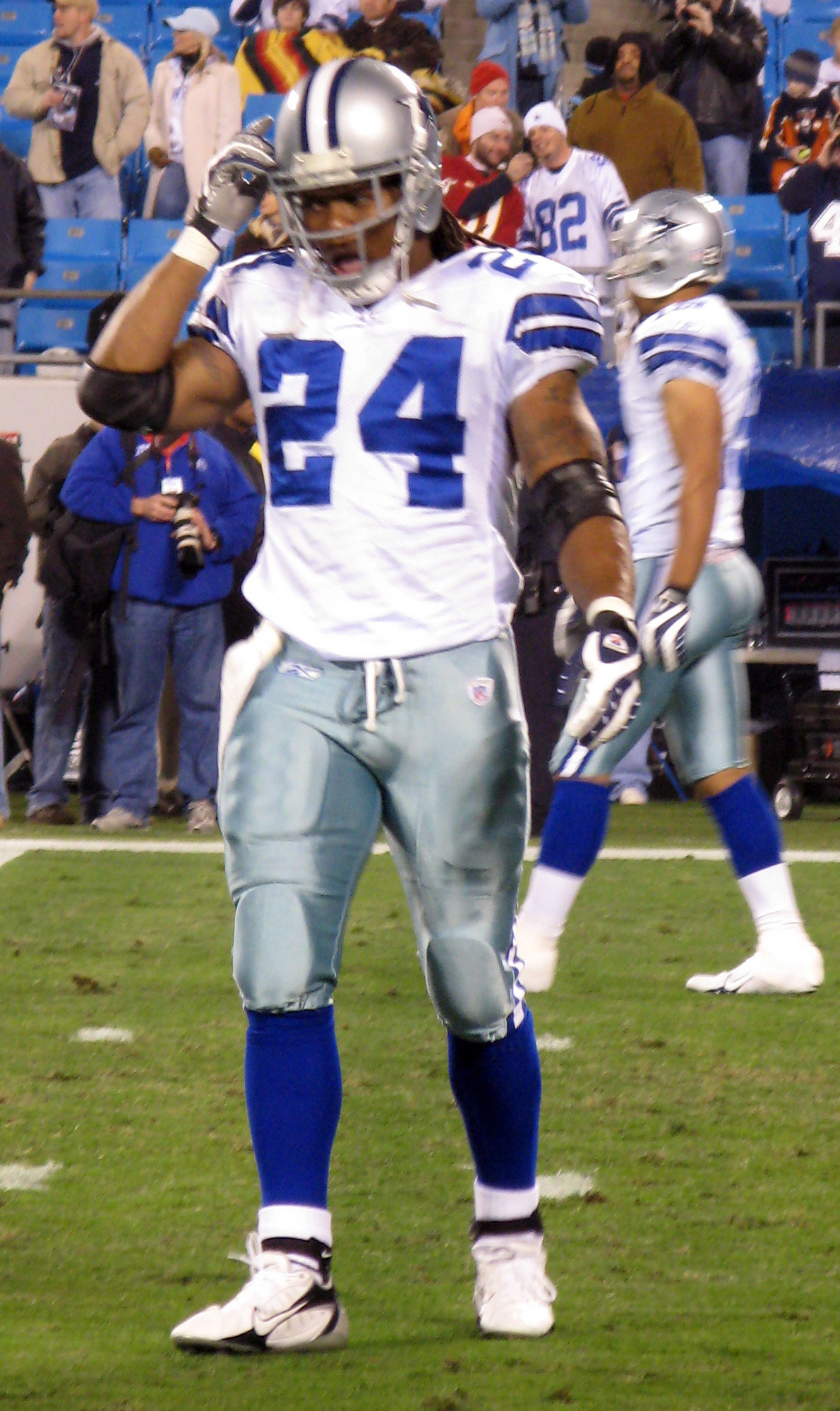
Marion Barber III

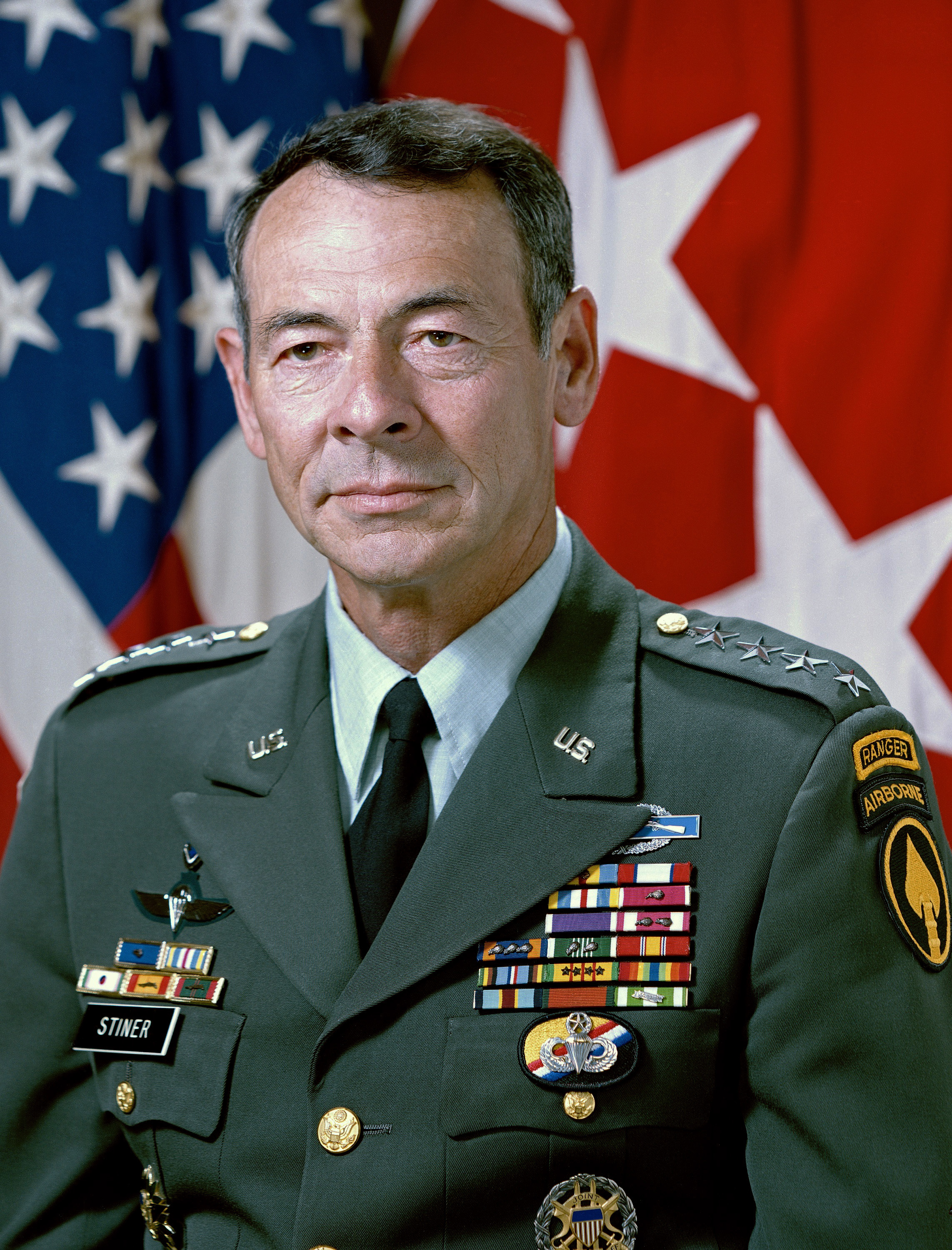
Carl Stiner

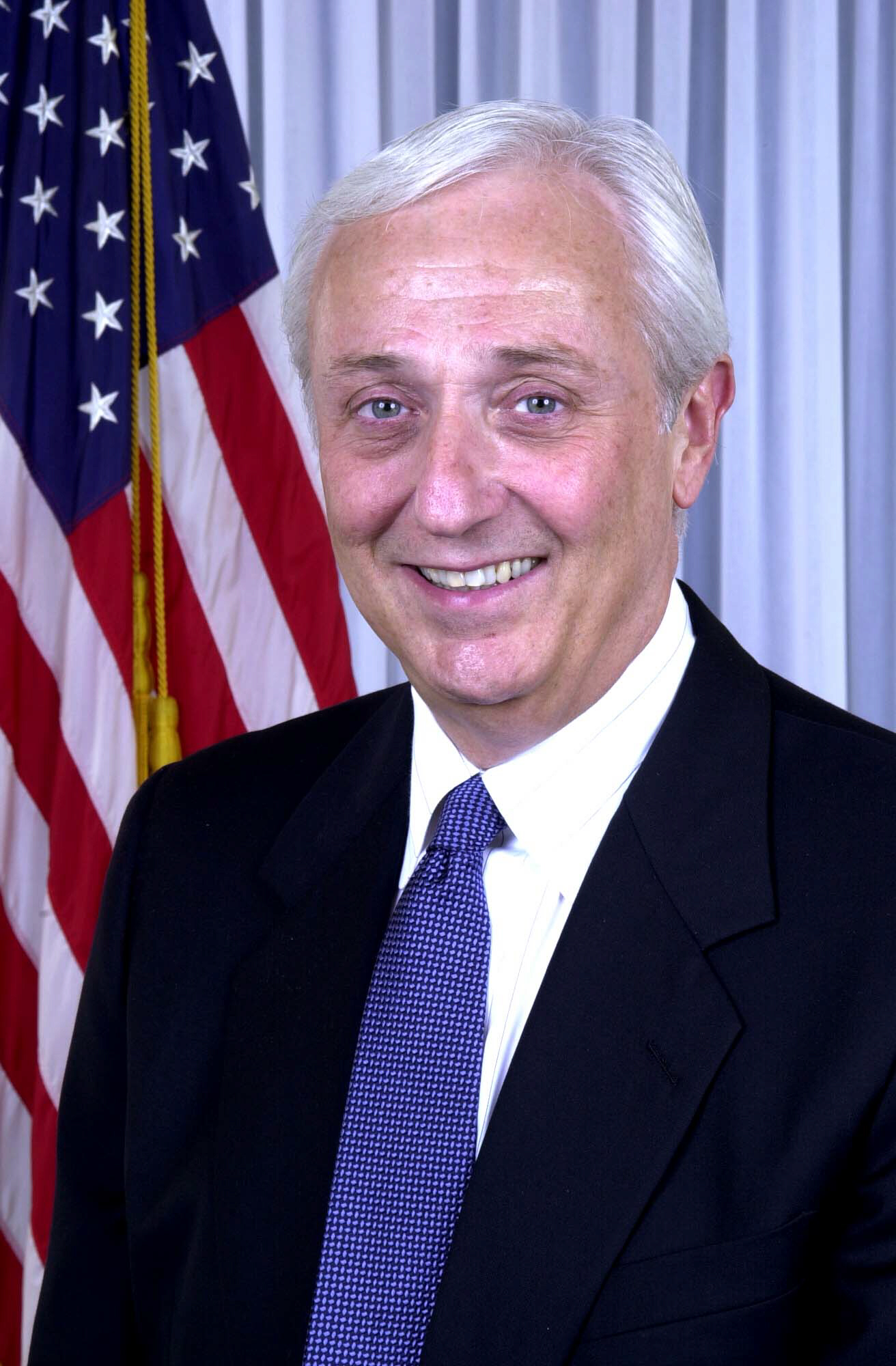
John Cooksey

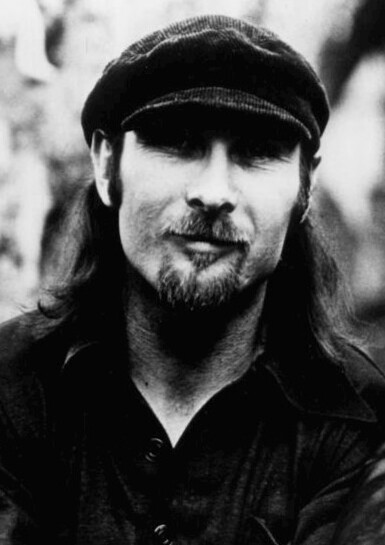
Jim Seals

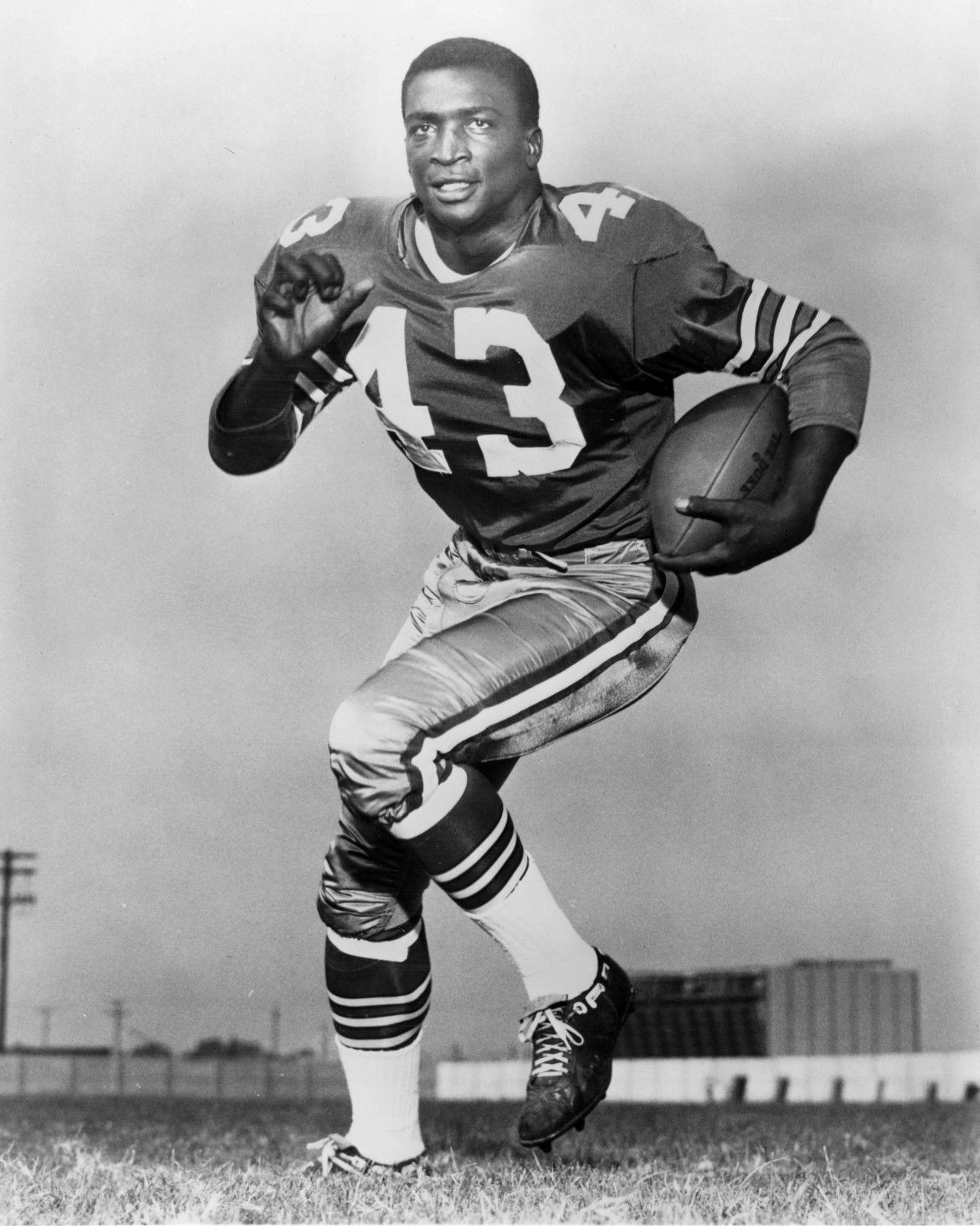
Don Perkins

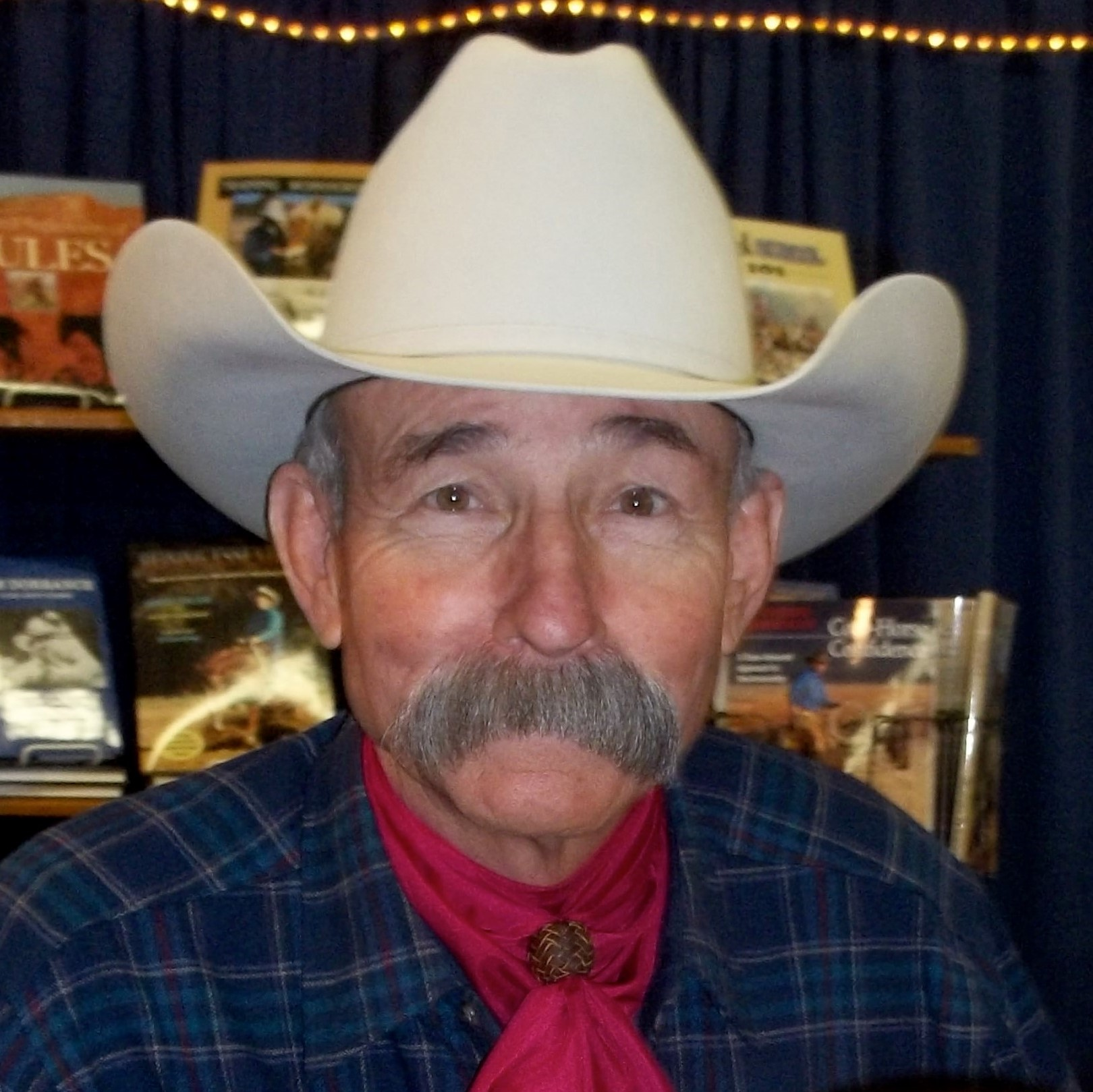
Baxter Black

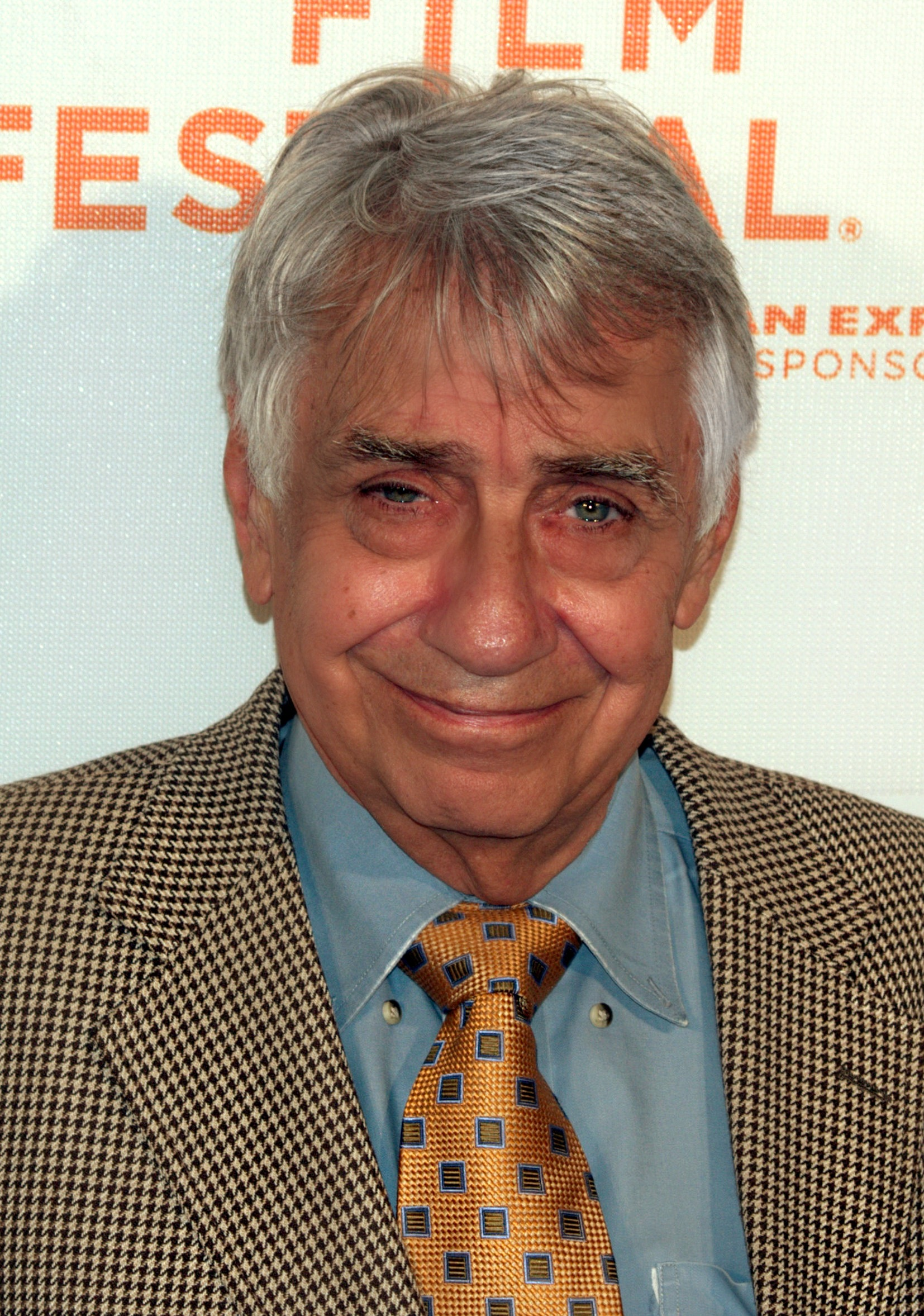
Philip Baker Hall

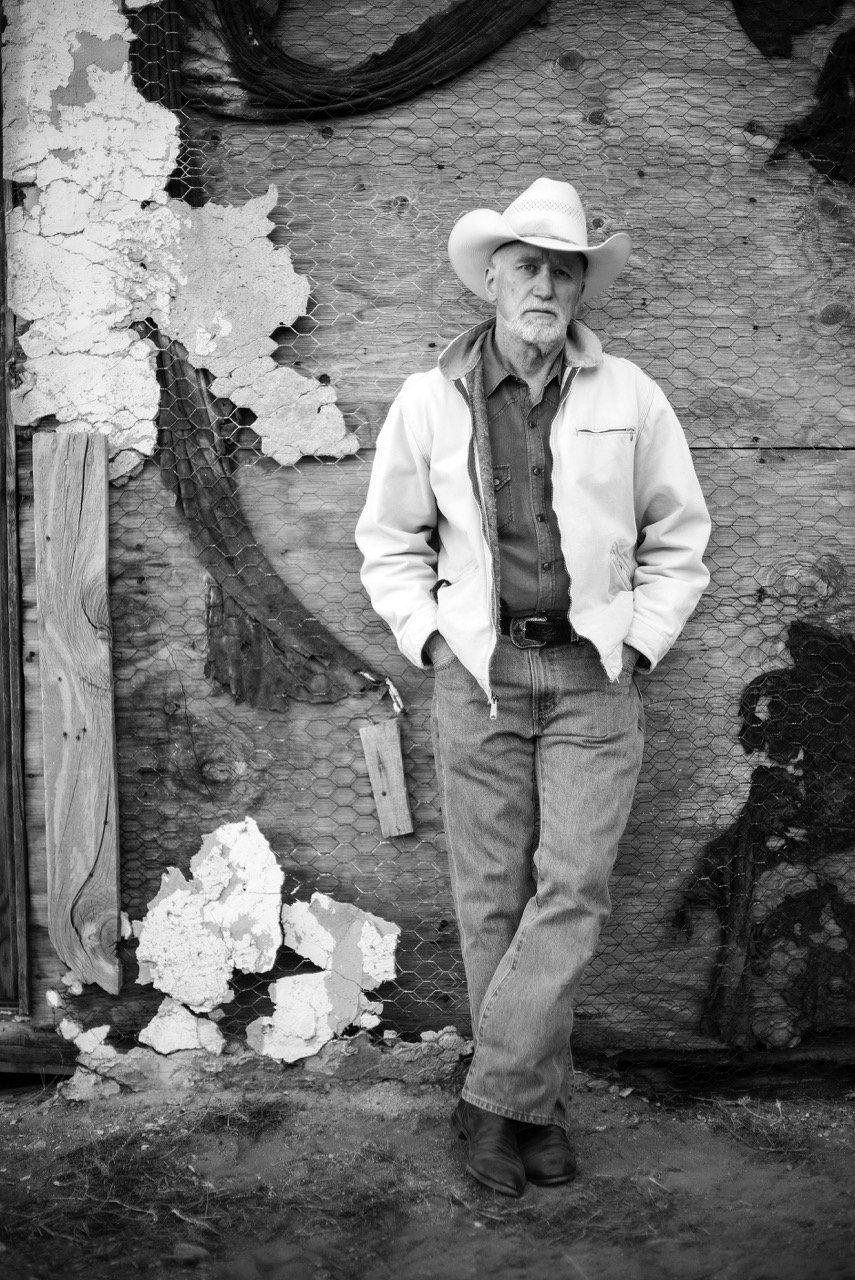
Kurt Markus

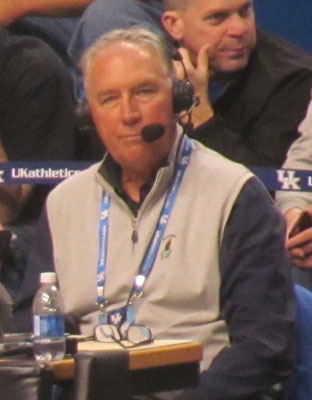
Mike Pratt

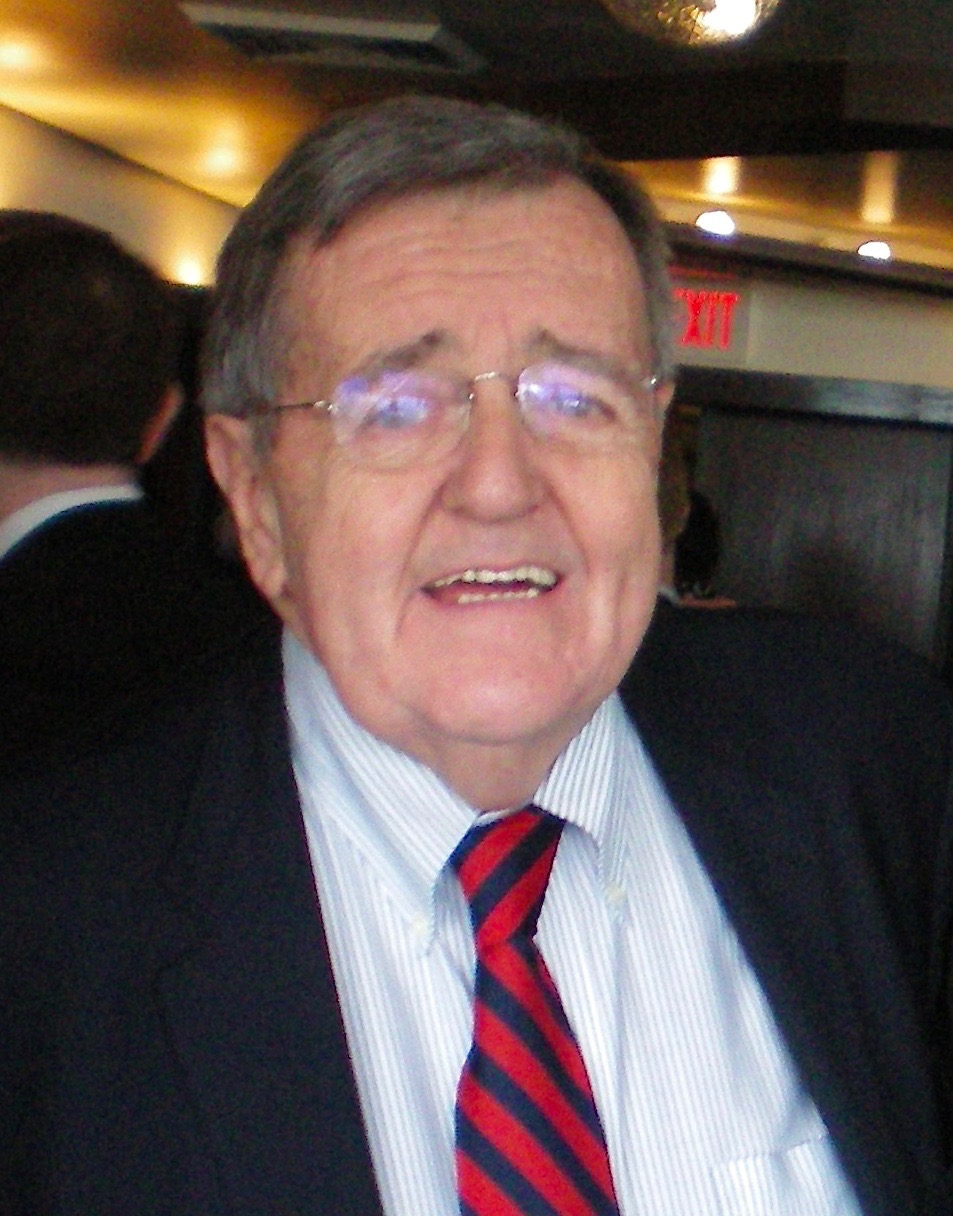
Mark Shields

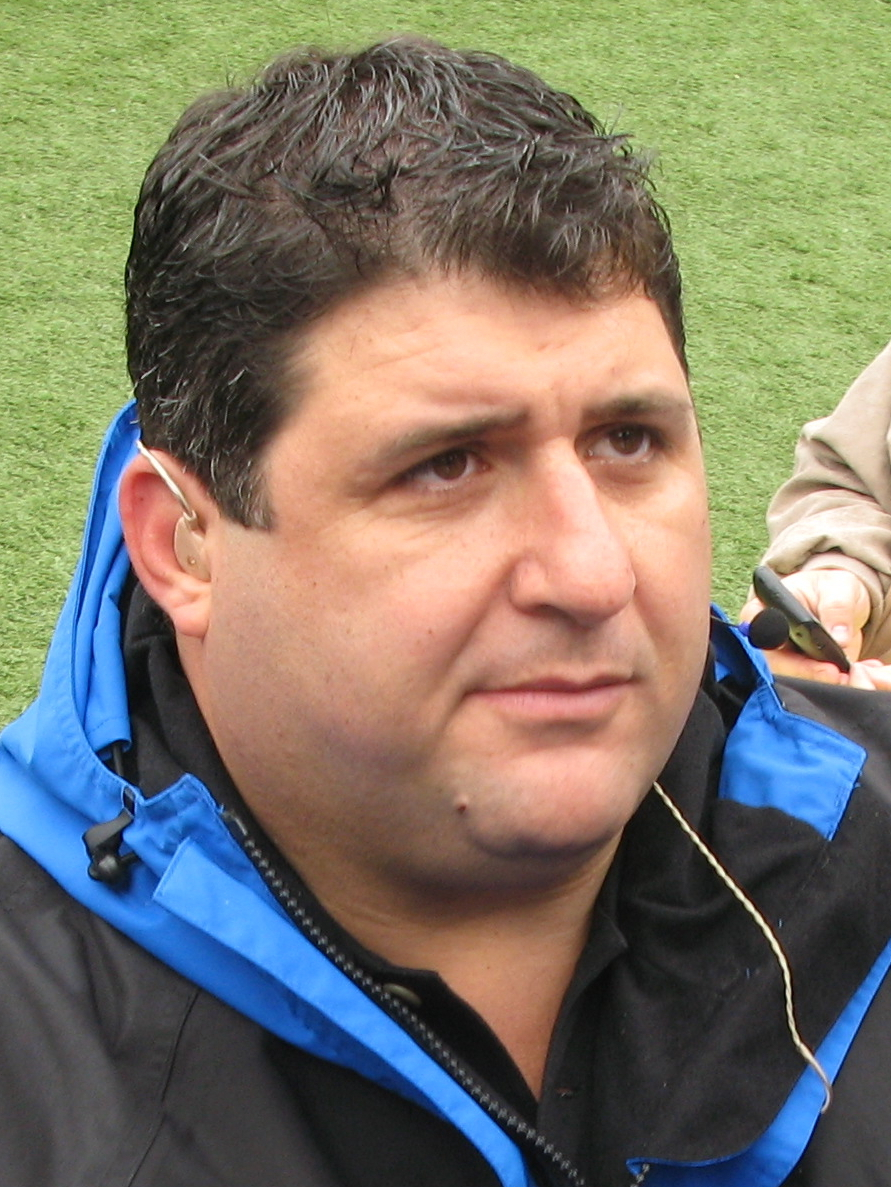
Tony Siragusa

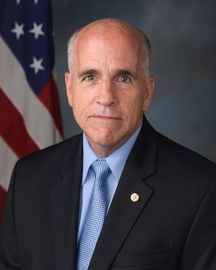
Michael C. Stenger

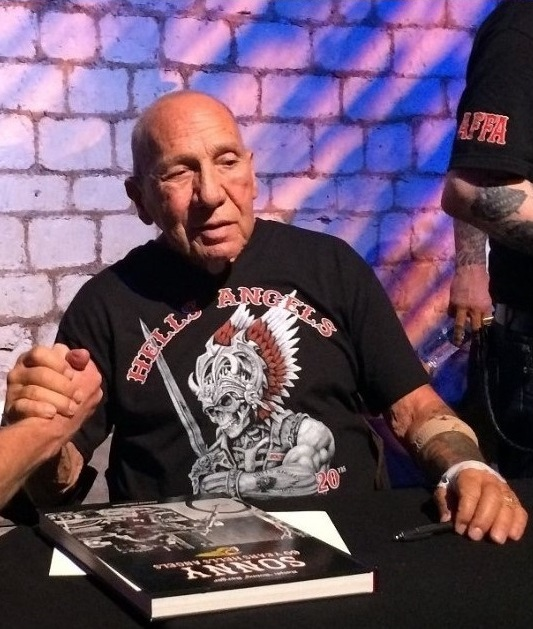
Sonny Barger

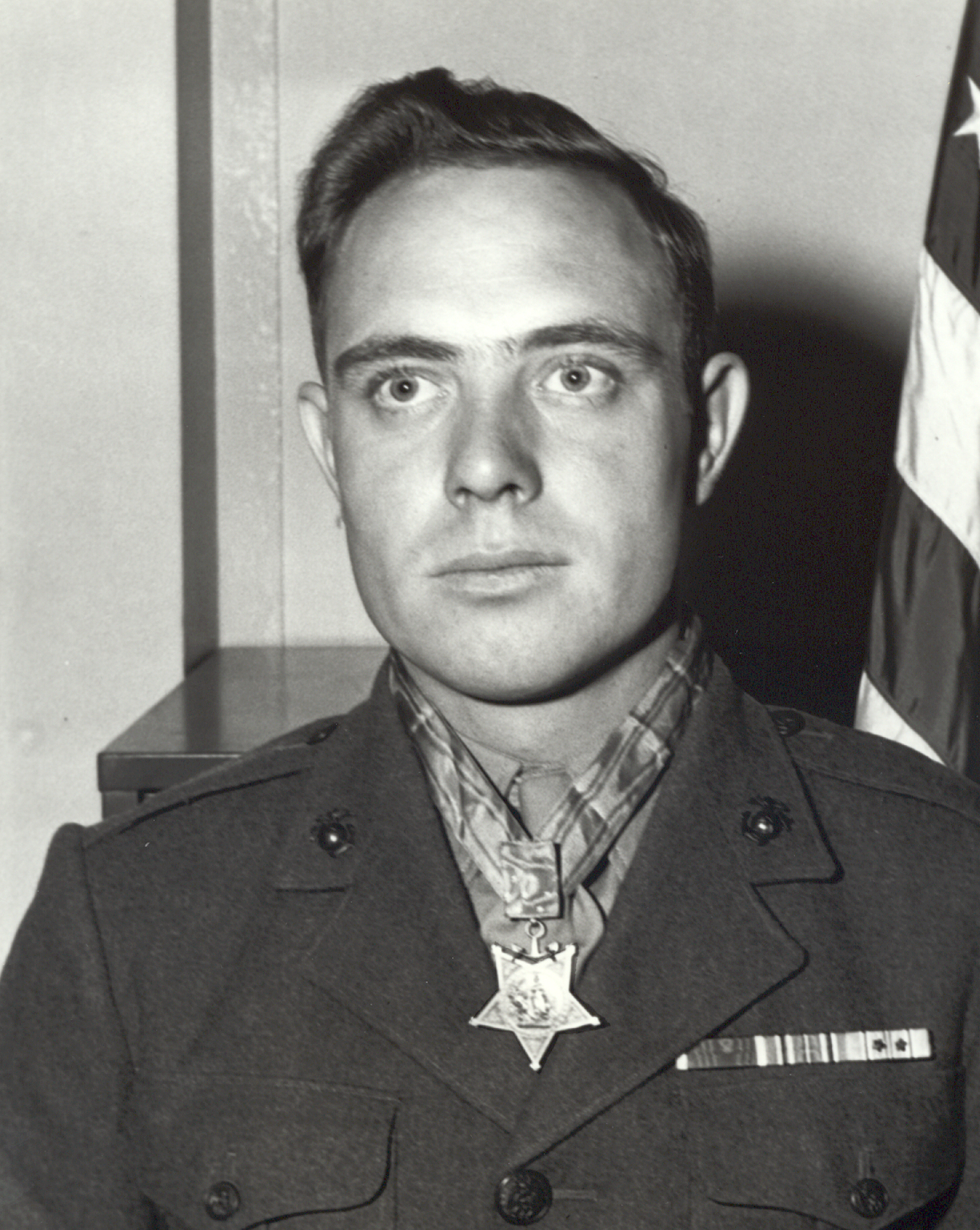
Hershel W. Williams

- June 1
  - Marion Barber III, 38, football player (Dallas Cowboys, Chicago Bears) (b. 1983)
  - Oris Buckner, 70, police detective and whistleblower (b. 1951)
  - Charles Kernaghan, 74, human rights, anti-corporation and worker's rights activist (b. 1948)
  - James M. Lewis, 78, politician, member of the Tennessee Senate (1986–1990) (b. 1943)
  - Frank Manumaleuga, 66, football player (Kansas City Chiefs) (b. 1956)
  - Deborah McCrary, 67, gospel singer (The McCrary Sisters) (b. 1954)
  - Mark Schaeffer, 73, baseball player (San Diego Padres) (b. 1948)
  - Shelby Scott, 86, television journalist (KIRO-TV, WBZ-TV) and union president (AFTRA) (b. 1936)
  - Barry Sussman, 87, newspaper editor (The Washington Post) (b. 1934)
  - Leroy Williams, 81, jazz drummer (b. 1941)
- June 2
  - Hal Bynum, 87, songwriter ("Lucille", "Chains", "Papa Was a Good Man") (b. 1934)
  - Paul Coppo, 83, Olympic ice hockey player (1964) (b. 1938)
  - Peter Daley, 71, politician, member of the Pennsylvania House of Representatives (1983–2016) (b. 1950)
  - Gonzalo Lopez, 46, mass murderer, shot by police (b. 1976)
  - Carl Stiner, 85, retired U.S. Army four-star general, commander of USSOCOM (1990–1993) (b. 1936)
- June 3
  - Robert L. Backman, 100, politician, member of the Utah House of Representatives (1971–1975) (b. 1922)
  - Ann Turner Cook, 95, author and model (Gerber Baby) (b. 1926)
  - Ken Kelly, 76, fantasy artist (Kiss, Rainbow, Manowar) (b. 1946)
  - Grachan Moncur III, 85, jazz trombonist (b. 1937)
  - John Porter, 87, politician, member of the Illinois House of Representatives (1973–1979) and U.S. House of Representatives (1980–2001) (b. 1935)
  - John Pier Roemer, 68, lawyer and judge, murdered (b. 1953)
- June 4
  - John Cooksey, 80, ophthalmologist and politician, member of the U.S. House of Representatives (1997–2003) (b. 1941)
  - Sherry Huber, 84, environmentalist and politician, member of the Maine House of Representatives (1976–1982) (b. 1938)
  - Beryl J. Levine, 86, Canadian-born judge, justice on the North Dakota Supreme Court (1985–1996) (b. 1935)
  - Nate Miller, 34, basketball player (Ironi Nahariya, Ironi Ramat Gan, Incheon ET Land Elephants) (b. 1987)
  - Robert Stewart, 55, football player (Charlotte Rage, New Jersey Red Dogs, Carolina Cobras) (b. 1967)
  - Veryl Switzer, 89, football player (Green Bay Packers, Calgary Stampeders, Montreal Alouettes) (b. 1932)
  - Alec John Such, 70, bassist and founding member of Bon Jovi (b. 1952)
- June 5
  - Edwin M. Leidel Jr., 83, Episcopal prelate, bishop of Eastern Michigan (1996–2006) (b. 1938)
  - Donald Pelletier, 90, Roman Catholic prelate, bishop of Morondava (1999–2010) (b. 1931)
  - Trouble, 34, rapper (b. 1987)
- June 6
  - Brother Jed, 79, evangelist (b. 1943)
  - A. L. Mestel, 95, pediatric surgeon and visual artist (b. 1926)
  - Edward C. Oliver, 92, politician, member of the Minnesota Senate (1993–2002) (b. 1930)
  - Jim Seals, 80, musician (Seals and Crofts, The Champs) and songwriter ("Summer Breeze") (b. 1941)
  - William J. Sullivan, 83, judge, member (1999–2009) and chief justice (2001–2006) of the Connecticut Supreme Court (b. 1939)
- June 7
  - Robert Alexander, 64, football player (Los Angeles Rams) (b. 1958)
  - Isaac Berger, 85, weightlifter, Olympic champion (1956) (b. 1936)
  - Frank Cipriani, 81, baseball player (Kansas City Athletics) (b. 1941)
  - Trudy Haynes, 95, television journalist; first African American TV weather reporter (WXYZ-TV), and TV news reporter (KYW-TV) (b. 1926)
  - Robert M. Utley, 92, author and historian (b. 1929)
- June 8
  - Rocky Freitas, 76, football player (Detroit Lions, Tampa Bay Buccaneers) (b. 1945)
  - Dale W. Jorgenson, 89, economist (b. 1933)
  - Ranan Lurie, 90, Egyptian-born Israeli-American political cartoonist and journalist (b. 1932)
  - George Thompson, 74, basketball player (Milwaukee Bucks) (b. 1947)
- June 9
  - Julee Cruise, 65, singer ("Falling", "If I Survive"), musician and actress (Twin Peaks) (b. 1956)
  - James C. Hayes, 76, politician, mayor of Fairbanks, Alaska (1992–2001), first African-American mayor in Alaska (b. 1946)
  - Billy Kametz, 35, voice actor (JoJo's Bizarre Adventure, Pokémon, Attack on Titan) (b. 1987)
  - Maxine Kline, 92, baseball player (Fort Wayne Daisies) (b. 1929)
  - Don Perkins, 84, football player (Dallas Cowboys) (b. 1938)
  - Shauneille Perry, 92, stage director and playwright (b. 1929)
  - Donald Pippin, 95, theatre musical director, Tony winner (1963) (b. 1926)
  - Thurman D. Rodgers, 87, military information and communications officer, oversaw installation of MSE for military (b. 1934)
  - Gordon M. Shepherd, 88, neuroscientist (b. 1933)
  - Ronni Solbert, 96, artist, photographer and illustrator (The Pushcart War) (b. 1925)
- June 10
  - Baxter Black, 77, cowboy poet and veterinarian (b. 1945)
  - Stuart Carlson, 66, editorial cartoonist (Milwaukee Journal Sentinel) (b. 1955)
  - Harry Gesner, 97, architect (b. 1925)
  - Sharon Oster, 73, economist and former dean of Yale School of Management (b. 1948)
  - Pravin Varaiya, 82, electrical engineer and academician (University of California, Berkeley) (b. 1940)
- June 11
  - Duncan Hannah, 69, visual artist (b. 1952)
  - George Weyerhaeuser Sr., 95, businessman and kidnap victim (b. 1925–1926)
- June 12
  - Gabe Baltazar, 92, jazz alto saxophonist and woodwind doubler (b. 1929)
  - Edward T. Begay, 87, politician, speaker of the Navajo Nation Council (1999–2003) (b. 1934)
  - Robert O. Fisch, 97, Hungarian-born pediatrician, artist, and author (b. 1925)
  - Jeffery Gifford, 75, politician, member of the Maine House of Representatives (since 2006) (b. 1946)
  - Philip Baker Hall, 90, actor (Magnolia, Zodiac, Rush Hour) (b. 1931)
  - Jim Ryan, 76, politician, attorney general of Illinois (1995–2003) (b. 1946)
  - Buster Welch, 94, cutting horse trainer (b. 1928)
- June 13
  - Melody Currey, 71, politician, member of the Connecticut House of Representatives (1993–2006) (b. 1950)
  - Kurt Markus, 75, photographer (b. 1947)
- June 14
  - Gene Kenney, 94, soccer coach (Michigan State Spartans) (b. 1928)
  - Everett Peck, 71, animator (Duckman, Squirrel Boy, The Critic) (b. 1950)
  - Simon Perchik, 98, poet (b. 1923)
  - Joel Whitburn, 82, author and music historian (b. 1939)
- June 15
  - Maureen Arthur, 88, actress (How to Succeed in Business Without Really Trying, The Love God?, A Man Called Dagger) (b. 1934)
  - Jay Hopler, 51, poet (b. 1970)
  - Peter Scott-Morgan, 64, English-born engineer (b. 1958)
- June 16
  - Don Allen, 84, amateur golfer (b. 1937/1938)
  - John Sears Casey, 91, politician, member of the Alabama House of Representatives (1959–1967) (b. 1930)
  - Michael Stephen Kanne, 83, jurist, judge on the U.S. Court of Appeals for the Seventh Circuit (since 1987) (b. 1938)
  - Mike Pratt, 73, basketball player (Kentucky Colonels), coach (Charlotte 49ers), and sportscaster (Kentucky Wildcats) (b. 1948)
  - Tim Sale, 66, comic book artist (Batman: The Long Halloween, Batman: Dark Victory, Superman for All Seasons) (b. 1956)
  - Tyler Sanders, 18, actor (Just Add Magic) (b. 2003/2004)
- June 17
  - Michel David-Weill, 89, investment banker, chairman of Lazard (1977–2001) (b. 1932)
  - Ray Greene, 83, college football player and coach (Jacksonville Sharks, North Carolina Central, Alabama A&M) (b. 1938)
  - Dave Hebner, 73, professional wrestling referee (WWF) (b. 1949)
  - Hugh McElhenny, 93, Hall of Fame football player (San Francisco 49ers, Minnesota Vikings, New York Giants, and Detroit Lions) (b. 1928)
  - Wilson Stone, 69, politician, member of the Kentucky House of Representatives (2009–2021) (b. 1952)
  - Lynn Wright, 69, politician, member of the Mississippi House of Representatives (since 2020) (b. 1952)
- June 18
  - Lennie Rosenbluth, 89, basketball player (Philadelphia Warriors) (b. 1933)
  - Mark Shields, 85, political commentator (PBS NewsHour, Capital Gang, Inside Washington) (b. 1937)
  - Dave Wickersham, 86, baseball player (Kansas City Athletics, Detroit Tigers, Pittsburgh Pirates, Kansas City Royals) (b. 1935)
- June 19
  - Clela Rorex, 78, civil servant (b. 1943)
  - Jim Schwall, 79, blues musician (Siegel–Schwall Band) (b. 1942)
  - Stephen Sinatra, 75, cardiologist and author (b. 1946)
  - Brett Tuggle, 70, keyboardist (Fleetwood Mac, David Lee Roth) and songwriter ("Just Like Paradise") (b. 1951)
  - Bob Turner, 87, politician, member of the Texas House of Representatives (1991–2003) (b. 1934)
  - Tim White, 68, professional wrestling referee (WWE) (b. 1954)
- June 20
  - James M. Bardeen, 83, physicist (b. 1939)
  - Dennis Cahill, 68, guitarist (The Gloaming) (b. 1954)
  - James Drees, 91, politician, member of the Iowa House of Representatives (1995–2001) (b. 1930)
  - Paul M. Ellwood Jr., 95, pediatrician (b. 1926)
  - Joe Staton, 74, baseball player (Detroit Tigers) (b. 1948)
  - Caleb Swanigan, 25, basketball player (Purdue Boilermakers, Portland Trail Blazers, Sacramento Kings) (b. 1997)
- June 21
  - Harvey Dinnerstein, 94, figurative artist (b. 1928)
  - Jaylon Ferguson, 26, football player (Baltimore Ravens, Louisiana Tech Bulldogs) (b. 1995)
  - Duncan Henderson, 72, film producer (American Gigolo, Master and Commander: The Far Side of the World, Space Jam: A New Legacy) (b. 1950)
  - Artie Kane, 93, pianist, film score composer (Eyes of Laura Mars, Night of the Juggler, Wrong Is Right) and conductor (b. 1929)
  - Brig Owens, 79, football player (Dallas Cowboys, Washington Redskins) (b. 1943)
  - James Rado, 90, actor (Lions Love), playwright and composer (Hair), Grammy winner (1969) (b. 1932)
- June 22
  - Patrick Adams, 72, record producer, music arranger, and musician (The Universal Robot Band, Musique) (b. 1950)
  - L. Patrick Devlin, 83, lecturer and author (b. 1939)
  - Alexander Jefferson, 100, USAF officer (Tuskegee Airmen) (b. 1921)
  - Robert A. Katz, 79, film (Gettysburg, Selena) and television (Introducing Dorothy Dandridge) producer and businessman (b. 1943)
  - Willie Morrow, 82, businessman and inventor (afro pick) (b. 1939)
  - Tony Siragusa, 55, football player (Indianapolis Colts, Baltimore Ravens), sportscaster (Fox) and TV host (Man Caves) (b. 1967)
  - Bruton Smith, 95, Hall of Fame motorsports promoter (Speedway Motorsports) (b. 1927)
  - Bernie Stolar, 75, video game industry executive, president of Mattel (1999–2005) (b. 1946)
- June 23
  - Bernard Belle, 57, musician, music producer and songwriter ("Remember the Time") (b. 1964)
  - Peter Molnar, 78, geophysicist (b. 1943)
  - Tommy Morgan, 89, harmonica player (b. 1932)
  - John F. Stack, 71, political scientist (b. 1950)
- June 24
  - Edward Abramoski, 88, athletic trainer (Buffalo Bills) (b. 1933)
  - Suzanne Deuchler, 92, politician, member of the Illinois House of Representatives (1981–1999) (b. 1929)
- June 25
  - Sam Gilliam, 88, painter (b. 1933)
  - Bill Woolsey, 87, Olympic swimmer and champion (1952) (b.1934)
- June 26
  - Bruce R. Katz, 75, entrepreneur (Rockport) (b. 1947)
  - Margaret Keane, 94, artist (b. 1927)
  - Mary Mara, 61, actress (Nash Bridges, ER, Law & Order) (b. 1960)
- June 27
  - Marlin Briscoe, 76, football player (Buffalo Bills, Detroit Lions, Miami Dolphins, San Diego Chargers, Denver Broncos, New England Patriots) (b. 1945)
  - Michael C. Stenger, 71, law enforcement officer, Sergeant at Arms of the United States Senate (2018–2021) (b. 1950)
  - Joe Turkel, 94, actor (The Shining, Blade Runner, Paths of Glory) (b. 1927)
- June 28
  - Dennis Egan, 75, broadcaster (KINY) and politician, member of the Alaska Senate (2009–2019) and mayor of Juneau (1995–2000) (b. 1947)
  - Mike Schuler, 81, basketball coach (Portland Trail Blazers, Los Angeles Clippers) (b. 1940)
  - John Visentin, 59, business executive, CEO of Xerox (since 2018) (b. 1962–1963)
- June 29
  - Bill Allen, 85, businessman, CEO of VECO Corporation (b. 1937)
  - Sonny Barger, 83, biker, author and actor (Sons of Anarchy), co-founder of the Hells Angels (b. 1938)
  - David Weiss Halivni, 94, Israeli-born rabbi (b. 1927)
  - Peter B. Lowry, 81, folklorist, musicologist, and record label owner (Trix Records) (b. 1941)
  - Anthony M. Villane, 92, politician, member of the New Jersey General Assembly (1976–1988) (b. 1929)
  - Hershel W. Williams, 98, Marine Corps warrant officer, Medal of Honor recipient (1945) (b. 1923)
- June 30
  - Muriel Phillips, 101, World War II veteran and writer (b. 1921)
  - Bill Squires, 89, track and field coach (Greater Boston Track Club) (b. 1932)
  - Technoblade, 23, YouTuber and streamer (b. 1999) (death announced on this date)
  - Vladimir Zelenko, 49, Ukrainian-born American physician (b. 1973)
