= Deaths in April 2022 =

The following is a list of notable deaths in April 2022.

Entries for each day are listed alphabetically by surname. A typical entry lists information in the following sequence:

- Name, age, country of citizenship at birth, subsequent country of citizenship (if applicable), reason for notability, cause of death (if known), and reference.

== April 2022 ==
=== 1 ===
- Andrei Babitsky, 57, Russian journalist (RFE/RL), cardiac arrest.
- Delfina Entrecanales, 94, Spanish arts philanthropist.
- Alberto Estella, 81, Spanish politician, deputy (1977–1982).
- Ryszard Frąckiewicz, 90, Polish diplomat, ambassador to Australia (1978–1983) and Japan (1986–1991).
- Everett Gendler, 93, American rabbi.
- Richard Cyril Hughes, 89, Welsh historian and author.
- Addagatla Chinna Innayya, 84, Indian Roman Catholic prelate, bishop of Nalgonda (1989–1993) and Srikakulam (1993–2018).
- Petre Ivănescu, 85, Romanian handball player (Dinamo București, national team) and coach (TUSEM Essen).
- Maks Levin, 40, Ukrainian photojournalist (Reuters, BBC), shot. (body discovered on this date)
- Jolanta Lothe, 79, Polish actress (Hunting Flies, The Cruise, The Deluge).
- C. W. McCall, 93, American country singer ("Convoy", "'Round the World with the Rubber Duck", "Roses for Mama") and politician, mayor of Ouray, Colorado (1986–1992), lung cancer.
- Mario Mettbach, 69, German politician, second mayor of Hamburg (2003–2004) and Hamburg MP (2001–2004). (death announced on this date)
- Munesuke Mita, 84, Japanese sociologist, sepsis.
- Eleanor Munro, 94, American art critic, art historian, and writer.
- Red Óg Murphy, 21, Irish footballer (DCU GAA, North Melbourne).
- Meena Parande, 91, Indian table tennis player.
- Nina Pereverzeva, 93, Russian politician, member of the CCCP (1982–1990).
- Daphne Pirie, 90, Australian athlete and sports administrator.
- Yuriy Ruf, 41, Ukrainian poet and writer.
- Neil Stevens, 74, Canadian Hall of Fame sportswriter (The Canadian Press), cancer.
- Jack Trickey, 87, Australian Olympic cyclist (1956).
- Jirō Tsuji, 94, Japanese chemist, lymphoma.
- Dejo Tunfulu, 49, Nigerian comedian, actor, and writer.
- Jerrold B. Tunnell, 71, American mathematician (Tunnell's theorem), traffic collision.
- Roland White, 83, American bluegrass guitarist, complications of a heart attack.
- Eleanor Whittemore, 95, American politician, member of the New Hampshire House of Representatives (1983–1985).
- Gerhard J. Woeginger, 57, Austrian mathematician.
- Aleksandra Yakovleva, 64, Russian actress (Air Crew, Charodei, A Man from the Boulevard des Capucines), breast cancer.
- Zou Yan, 106, Chinese military officer.

=== 2 ===
- Vance Amory, 72, Nevisian politician and cricketer (Leeward Islands, Combined Islands), premier of Nevis (1992–2006, 2013–2017).
- Sergio Chejfec, 65, Argentine writer.
- Joseph A. DiClerico Jr., 81, American jurist, judge (since 1992) and chief judge (1992–1997) for the U.S. District Court for New Hampshire.
- Paulo França, 70, Brazilian politician, Santa Catarina MLA (2011–2015), cancer.
- Oswaldo Frossasco, 69, Argentine Olympic cyclist (1976).
- George S. Gaadt, 80, American artist.
- Sir Robin Gray, 90, New Zealand politician, MP (1978–1996), speaker of the House of Representatives (1990–1993).
- Estelle Harris, 93, American actress (Seinfeld, Toy Story, The Suite Life of Zack & Cody).
- Rex Harris, 82, British academic.
- Victor Hettigoda, 84, Sri Lankan businessman.
- Javier Imbroda, 61, Spanish basketball coach and politician, member of the Andalusian parliament (since 2018) and regional minister of education and sports (since 2019), prostate cancer.
- Mantas Kvedaravičius, 45, Lithuanian film director, shot.
- Silvio Longobucco, 70, Italian footballer (Ternana, Juventus, Cagliari).
- Mirjana Majurec, 69, Croatian actress (The Rat Savior, King's Endgame, Below the Line).
- Mıgırdiç Margosyan, 83, Turkish writer.
- Sidney Marsh, 82, Australian Olympic wrestler.
- Henrich Mayorov, 85, Russian-Ukrainian choreographer and ballet dancer.
- Snežana Nikšić, 78, Serbian actress (Siberian Lady Macbeth, The Tiger, Bolji život).
- Clyde Rimple, 84, Trinidadian Olympic cyclist.
- Leonel Sánchez, 85, Chilean football player (Universidad de Chile, Colo-Colo, national team) and manager, pulmonary fibrosis.
- Gerald Schreck, 83, American sailor, Olympic champion (1968).

=== 3 ===
- Ave Alavainu, 79, Estonian poet and writer.
- Yamina Bachir, 68, Algerian film director (Rachida) and screenwriter (Sandstorm).
- Noeline Brokenshire, 96, New Zealand cricketer (Canterbury), field hockey player (national team) and British Empire Games sprinter (1950).
- June Brown, 95, English actress (EastEnders, The Duchess of Duke Street, Bean) and writer.
- Gerald Coates, 77, English evangelist.
- Christopher Coover, 72, American antique books appraiser, pneumonia complicated by Parkinson's disease.
- Tommy Davis, 83, American baseball player (Los Angeles Dodgers, Baltimore Orioles, Oakland Athletics) and coach, World Series champion (1963).
- Archie Eversole, 37, German-born American rapper, shot.
- Lygia Fagundes Telles, 98, Brazilian writer, member of the Brazilian Academy of Letters.
- Heikki Hedman, 81, Finnish tennis player.
- William S. Horne, 85, American politician, member of the Maryland House of Delegates (1973–1989).
- Jin Di, 89, Chinese actress (The Wedding Maidens), television director and screenwriter.
- Bruce Johnson, 71, American news anchor and reporter (WUSA), heart attack.
- Werner Klatt, 73, German rower, Olympic champion (1976).
- Gerda Weissmann Klein, 97, Polish-American writer and human rights activist.
- David G. Mason, 79, American politician, member of the Kentucky House of Representatives (1974–1977).
- Michael Meier, 93, German Roman Catholic prelate, coadjutor archbishop (1984–1987) and archbishop (1987–2006) of Mount Hagen.
- Donn B. Murphy, 91, American theatre and speech teacher (Georgetown University) and theatrical advisor.
- Einar Østby, 86, Norwegian cross-country skier, Olympic silver medallist (1960).
- Stan Parrish, 75, American football coach (Tampa Bay Buccaneers, Ball State Cardinals, Michigan Wolverines), cancer.
- Frances Porter, 96, New Zealand writer and historian.
- Pamela Rooke, 66, British model and actress, bile duct cancer.
- Betty Rowland, 106, American burlesque dancer.
- Desmond Seward, 86, British historian.
- Gene Shue, 90, American basketball player (Fort Wayne/Detroit Pistons, New York Knicks) and coach (Baltimore/Washington Bullets), melanoma.
- Willie Tasby, 89, American baseball player (Baltimore Orioles, Washington Senators, Cleveland Indians).
- Kainakary Thankaraj, 75, Indian actor (Amen, Ee.Ma.Yau., Home).
- Nobuyoshi Tsubota, 89, Japanese baseball glove designer.
- James Webster, 96, Australian politician, senator (1964–1980), minister for science (1975–1979).
- Andrzej Wiśniewski, 66, Polish football coach (Wisła Płock, Palestine, Polonia Warsaw), heart attack.

=== 4 ===
- Julie Amato, 78, American actress (The Ghost Dance), intraparenchymal hemorrhage.
- Bob Babich, 74, American football player (Cleveland Browns, San Diego Chargers).
- Donald Baechler, 65, American painter and sculptor, heart attack.
- Richard Bird, 79, English computer scientist.
- Eric Boehlert, 57, American media critic and writer (Salon, Rolling Stone, Billboard), hit by train.
- Madeline Cain, 72, American politician, member of the Ohio House of Representatives (1989–1995) and mayor of Lakewood, Ohio (1996–2003).
- José Geraldo da Cruz, 80, Brazilian Roman Catholic prelate, bishop of Juazeiro (2003–2016).
- Karine Danielyan, 74, Armenian politician, minister of nature and environment protection (1991–1994).
- Margo Feiden, 77, American art gallery owner, complications from a fall.
- Maya Govind, 82, Indian lyricist, heart attack.
- Julian J. Hook, 80, American politician, member of the Minnesota House of Representatives (1971–1974).
- Little Karim, 71, Pakistani mountaineer, liver cancer.
- Friedrich-Wilhelm Kiel, 87, German politician, member of the Landtag of Baden-Württemberg (1992–2001), mayor of Ettlingen (1966–1970) and Fellbach (1976–2000).
- Kathy Lamkin, 74, American actress (No Country for Old Men, The Texas Chainsaw Massacre, The Astronaut Farmer).
- Li Suwen, 88, Chinese politician, vice chairperson of the Standing Committee of the NPC (1975–1978).
- John McNally, 89, Irish boxer, Olympic silver medallist (1952).
- Joe Messina, 93, American Hall of Fame guitarist (The Funk Brothers).
- Norio Niikawa, 79, Japanese physician and medical geneticist, discoverer of Kabuki syndrome.
- Boris Powell, 57, American boxer, amyotrophic lateral sclerosis.
- Raziel, 49, Mexican professional wrestler (CMLL).
- Jim Reilly, 77, American politician, member of the Illinois House of Representatives (1977–1983).
- Vernon Scoville, 68, American politician, member of the Missouri House of Representatives (1983–1991).
- Django Sissoko, 74, Malian civil servant, acting prime minister (2012–2013) and minister of justice (1984–1988).
- Petar Skansi, 78, Croatian basketball player (Jugoplastika, Yugoslavia national team) and coach (Benetton Treviso), Olympic silver medalist (1968).
- Branislav Šoškić, 99, Montenegrin politician, president of the Socialist Republic of Montenegro (1985–1986).
- Herb Turetzky, 76, American basketball official scorer (Brooklyn Nets), primary lateral sclerosis.
- Jerry Uelsmann, 87, American photographer.
- Gordon Watters, 93, American ice hockey player (Minnesota Golden Gophers) and pediatric neurologist.
- Joseph P. Wyatt Jr., 80, American politician, member of the U.S. House of Representatives (1979–1981) and the Texas House of Representatives (1971–1979).
- Juan Zanassi, 75, Argentine Olympic rower (1964).
- Andrzej Zygmunt, 76, Polish footballer (national team).

=== 5 ===
- Sidney Altman, 82, Canadian-American molecular biologist, Nobel Prize laureate (1989).
- Harry Billinge, 96, British World War II veteran and fundraiser.
- Boris Brott, 78, Canadian conductor, traffic collision.
- Joaquim Carvalho, 84, Portuguese footballer (Sporting CP, Atlético, national team).
- John Cumberland, 74, American baseball player (New York Yankees, San Francisco Giants, St. Louis Cardinals).
- John Ellis, 73, American baseball player (New York Yankees, Cleveland Indians, Texas Rangers), cancer.
- Helen Fletcher, 90, English tennis player.
- Graciela Giannettasio, 71, Argentine politician, deputy (2007–2015) and minister of education (2002–2003).
- Roberta Kalechofsky, 90, American writer and rights activist.
- David Keyte, 67–68, English businessman and football club chairman, liver cancer.
- David Kilgour, 81, Canadian politician, MP (1979–2006), lung disease.
- Stanisław Kowalski, 111, Polish masters athlete, nation's oldest living man (since 2018).
- Joan LeQuia, 87, American baseball player (Grand Rapids Chicks).
- Windsor Major, 94, Welsh rugby union player.
- Josef Panáček, 84, Czech sport shooter, Olympic champion (1976).
- Nehemiah Persoff, 102, American actor (Some Like It Hot, An American Tail, Yentl), heart failure.
- Edward Rayner, 89, English footballer (Northwich Victoria, Stoke City, Macclesfield Town).
- Lee Rose, 85, American basketball coach (Charlotte 49ers, Purdue Boilermakers, South Florida Bulls) and athletic administrator.
- Bobby Rydell, 79, American singer ("Wild One", "Wildwood Days") and actor (Bye Bye Birdie), pneumonia.
- Bill Sadler, 90, Canadian racecar and aircraft designer.
- Yoshikazu Shirakawa, 87, Japanese photographer, stroke.
- Paul Siebel, 84, American singer-songwriter.
- Yefrem Sokolov, 95, Belarusian politician, first secretary of the Communist Party (1987–1990).
- Doug Sutherland, 73, American football player (Minnesota Vikings, Seattle Seahawks).
- Bjarni Tryggvason, 76, Icelandic-born Canadian astronaut (STS-85).
- Eelco Visser, 55, Dutch computer scientist.
- Jimmy Wang Yu, 79, Taiwanese actor (Golden Swallow, One-Armed Swordsman, The Chinese Boxer).
- Leslie Young, 72, Chinese-born New Zealand economist.

=== 6 ===
- Rae Allen, 95, American actress (And Miss Reardon Drinks A Little, A League of Their Own, The Sopranos), Tony winner (1971).
- William Roger Callahan, 90, Canadian journalist and politician.
- Dolores Álvarez Campillo, 61, Spanish politician, member of the General Junta of the Principality of Asturias (2015–2019), cancer.
- Drew Christiansen, 77, American Jesuit priest.
- Mark Conover, 61, American Olympic runner (1988), cancer.
- John Creighton, 85, New Zealand rugby union player (Canterbury, national team).
- Reinhilde Decleir, 73, Belgian actress (Doctor Vlimmen, Whitey, Love Belongs to Everyone), euthanasia.
- Ana Derșidan-Ene-Pascu, 77, Romanian fencer, Olympic bronze medallist (1968, 1972).
- Joe Dickson, 82, Canadian politician.
- Karol Divín, 86, Hungarian-born Slovak figure skater, Olympic silver medallist (1960).
- Nergüin Enkhbat, 60, Mongolian Olympic boxer.
- Helen Golden, 81, Dutch singer.
- Melvin Hulse, 74, Belizean politician, colon cancer.
- Jill Knight, 98, British politician, MP (1966–1997), member of the House of Lords (1997–2016).
- Nicole Maestracci, 71, French lawyer, member of the Constitutional Council (2013–2022).
- Emiliano Mascetti, 79, Italian football player (Hellas Verona, Como, Torino) and manager.
- David McKee, 87, British writer and illustrator (Mr Benn, Elmer the Patchwork Elephant, Not Now, Bernard).
- Georg Neuber, 96, German Olympic fencer (1960).
- Karl Neuse, 91, German Olympic water polo player (1956).
- Helen Oppenheimer, 95, British theologian and academic.
- John van de Rest, 82, Dutch film director and screenwriter.
- Régis Rey, 92, French Olympic ski jumper.
- Domingo Romera, 85, Spanish politician and captain, senator (1984–1986), MEP (1986–1994).
- Camilla Salvago Raggi, 98, Italian poet and novelist.
- Horst Schröder, 84, German politician, MP (1972–1984).
- Annie Servais-Thysen, 88, Belgian politician, member of the Walloon parliament (1995–2004).
- Abraham Sie, 22, Ivorian basketball player (ABC Fighters, DUC Dakar, national team).
- Tom Smith, 50, Scottish rugby union player (Northampton Saints, national team, British & Irish Lions), colorectal cancer.
- Tadao Takahashi, 71, Brazilian Hall of Fame computer scientist, heart attack.
- Mikhail Vasenkov, 79, Russian spy (Illegals Program).
- Wen Hsia, 93, Taiwanese singer and actor, organ failure.
- Yu Guocong, 99, Chinese engineer, member of the Chinese Academy of Sciences.
- Vladimir Zhirinovsky, 75, Russian politician, MP (since 1993), COVID-19.
- Gerd Zimmermann, 72, German footballer (Fortuna Düsseldorf, Houston Hurricane, Calgary Boomers).

=== 7 ===
- Garibaldi Alves, 98, Brazilian politician, senator (2011–2014) and Rio Grande do Norte MLA (1957–1969).
- Christopher Ball, 85, British composer.
- Carlos Barrera Sánchez, 71, Spanish politician, síndic d'Aran (1995–2007, 2015–2019).
- Shamsha Berkimbayeva, 79, Kazakh academic and politician, minister of education and science (2002–2003).
- John Chester, 86, British Olympic rower.
- Dušan Čkrebić, 94, Serbian politician, prime minister (1974–1978) and president (1984–1986).
- Elias Davidsson, 81, Icelandic composer and conspiracy theorist.
- Ludwik Dorn, 67, Polish politician, MP (1997–2015), deputy prime minister and minister of interior and administration (2005–2007).
- Mercè Durfort i Coll, 78, Spanish biologist and professor, member of Institute for Catalan Studies (since 1989).
- Miguel Ángel Estrella, 81, Argentine pianist, ambassador to UNESCO (2003–2015) and member of the Russell Tribunal.
- Bernard Fisher, 88, English footballer (Hull City, Bradford City).
- Fujiko Fujio, 88, Japanese manga artist (Ninja Hattori-kun, The Monster Kid, The Laughing Salesman).
- Mary Green, 78, British Olympic sprinter (1968).
- John Jobling, 84, Australian politician, New South Wales MLC (1984–2003).
- Dorothy Johnson, 85, American model and actress (Life Begins at 17, The Flying Fontaines, Bernardine).
- Robert Kharshiing, 63, Indian politician, MP (2002–2008).
- Kim Yong-Bock, 83–84, South Korean theologian, colorectal cancer.
- Ramatu Aliu Mahama, 70, Ghanaian educationist, Second Lady of Ghana (2001–2009)
- Pedro Marchetta, 79, Argentine football player (Racing Club, Santiago Morning) and coach (Belgrano).
- Hellmuth Matiasek, 90, Austrian theatre director, theatre manager (Theater am Gärtnerplatz), and drama school president (Bayerische Theaterakademie August Everding).
- Eileen Grant McGeoghegan, 68, American politician, member of the Missouri House of Representatives (1983–1991)
- Isato Nakagawa, 75, Japanese guitarist, chronic kidney disease.
- BM Nazrul Islam, 75, Bangladeshi politician, MP (1999–2001).
- Michael Neidorff, 79, American business executive, CEO of Centene Corporation (since 1996).
- Birgit Nordin, 88, Swedish opera singer.
- Elvis Nyathi, 43, Zimbabwean refugee, beaten and burned.
- Emmanuel Portacio, 52, Filipino lawn bowler.
- Jürgen Reents, 72, German journalist and politician, deputy (1983–1985).
- Hiro Sachiya, 85, Japanese religious scholar, liver cancer.
- Carlos Salazar, 90, Filipino actor.
- Man Sasaki, 95, Japanese politician, councillor (1976–1998).
- Arliss Sturgulewski, 94, American politician, member of the Alaska Senate (1979–1993).
- Hana Truncová, 97, Czech political prisoner.
- Ken West, 64, Australian music promoter, founder of Big Day Out.
- Rayfield Wright, 76, American Hall of Fame football player (Dallas Cowboys), Super Bowl champion (VI, XII).

=== 8 ===
- Psalm Adjeteyfio, 55, Ghanaian actor (A Stab in the Dark), complications from heart failure.
- Emily Akuffo, 88, Ghanaian teacher, first lady (1978–1979).
- Hannah Arterian, 72, American legal administrator and academic.
- Carl Boles, 87, American baseball player (San Francisco Giants).
- Chai-Sik Chung, 91, South Korean-born American social ethicist and sociologist.
- Massimo Cristaldi, 66, Italian film producer (Our Italian Husband, Sicilian Ghost Story).
- Henri Depireux, 78, Belgian football player (Standard Liège, national team) and manager (Bellinzona).
- Allan Donaldson, 92, Canadian writer and academic.
- Stelio Fenzo, 89, Italian cartoonist.
- E. Peter Geiduschek, 93, Austrian-born American molecular biologist.
- Bob Gray, 98, English footballer (Gateshead).
- Betty Grundberg, 84, American politician.
- Edwin Kantar, 89, American bridge player, world champion (1977, 1979).
- Barak Lufan, 35, Israeli sprint kayaker and Paralympic coach, shot.
- Minori Matsushima, 81, Japanese actress, voice actress, and narrator (Candy Candy, Dororo, Mazinger Z), pancreatic cancer.
- Osinachi Nwachukwu, 42, Nigerian gospel singer, blood clot.
- Chibuzor Nwakanma, 57, Nigerian footballer (Mohun Bagan AC, SC East Bengal, Mohammedan SC), cardiac arrest.
- Brian O'Rouke, 72–73, Irish composer and singer.
- Peng Ming-min, 98, Taiwanese independence activist.
- Liza Picard, 94, English lawyer and historian.
- Ismail Rama, 86, Albanian Olympic sport shooter.
- Hudarni Rani, 71, Indonesian politician, senator (since 2014) and governor of Bangka Belitung Islands (2002–2007).
- Mimi Reinhardt, 107, Austrian secretary (Oskar Schindler).
- József Salim, 54, Hungarian Olympic taekwondo practitioner (1992, 2000).
- John Shy, 91, American military historian.
- George H. Smith, 73, American author.
- Nagai Sriram, 41, Indian Carnatic violinist.
- Carlos Tiny, 71, São Toméan politician, Foreign Minister (2008–2010).
- José Vilariño, 60, Argentine politician, deputy (1995–1999, 2003–2015), cardiac arrest.
- Alexander Vovin, 61, Russian-American Japanologist.

=== 9 ===
- Stephen Athipozhiyil, 77, Indian Roman Catholic prelate, coadjutor bishop (2000–2001) and bishop (2001–2019) of Alleppey.
- Chris Bailey, 65, Kenyan-born Australian musician (The Saints) and songwriter ("(I'm) Stranded", "Just Like Fire Would").
- Mannava Balayya, 92, Indian actor (Chivaraku Migiledi, Irugu Porugu, Bobbili Yuddham), writer and film producer.
- Moby Benedict, 91, American baseball player and coach (Michigan Wolverines).
- Tom Bleick, 79, American football player (Baltimore Colts, Atlanta Falcons).
- Uwe Bohm, 60, German actor (Moritz, Dear Moritz, Yasemin, Herzlich willkommen).
- Brian Booth, 97, Australian cricketer (Tasmania).
- Jim Bronstad, 85, American baseball player (Washington Senators, New York Yankees).
- Riccardo Dalisi, 90, Italian architect and designer.
- Ihor Dashko, 44, Ukrainian military officer, suicide by explosion.
- Michael Degen, 90, German-Israeli actor (Supermarket, Beyond Good and Evil, Dr. M).
- Michel Delebarre, 75, French politician, mayor of Dunkirk (1989–2014) and senator (2011–2017).
- Lellos Demetriades, 89, Cypriot politician, mayor of Nicosia Municipality (1971–2001) and deputy (1960–1970).
- Inga Freidenfelds, 86, Latvian-born Australian Olympic basketball player (1956).
- Chiara Frugoni, 82, Italian historian.
- Trevor Harrop, 94, Canadian-born British Olympic swimmer (1948).
- Dwayne Haskins, 24, American football player (Washington Redskins/Football Team, Pittsburgh Steelers), traffic collision.
- Henk Hermsen, 84, Dutch Olympic water polo player.
- Jack Higgins, 92, British author (The Eagle Has Landed, Thunder Point, Angel of Death).
- Ann Hutchinson Guest, 103, American dance notator.
- Myra Larcombe, 94, New Zealand swimming coach.
- John McCourtney, 78, Scottish Olympic wrestler.
- Pat Newman, 82, American tennis coach.
- Lawrence Poitras, 91, Canadian jurist, chief justice of the Superior Court of Quebec (1992–1996).
- George Siscoe, 84, American physicist.
- Dick Swatland, 76, American football player (Houston Oilers, Bridgeport Jets).
- Allan Trusler, 88, Australian footballer (Footscray).
- Brian Winston, 80, British journalist.
- Jeremy Young, 87, British actor (Doctor Who, Coronation Street, Crooks and Coronets).

=== 10 ===
- John Arguelles, 94, American jurist, associate justice of the Supreme Court of California (1987–1989).
- Gary Barrett, 82, American ecologist.
- Philippe Boesmans, 85, Belgian composer.
- Desmond Brathwaite, Saint Lucian politician, MP (1987–1997).
- Gary Brown, 52, American football player (Houston Oilers, New York Giants, San Diego Chargers) and coach, cancer.
- Jon Herwig Carlsen, 84, Norwegian sports commentator (NRK).
- John Drew, 67, American basketball player (Atlanta Hawks, Utah Jazz), bone cancer.
- Francis Geng, 90, French politician, deputy (1978–1993).
- Eya Guezguez, 17, Tunisian Olympic sailor (2020), drowned.
- Joe Horlen, 84, American baseball player (Chicago White Sox, Oakland Athletics), World Series champion (1972).
- M. C. Josephine, 74, Indian politician, chairperson of the Kerala Women's Commission (2017–2021), heart attack.
- Kalindi, 28, Brazilian footballer (Penafiel, Nacional).
- Hazem Nuseibeh, 99, Jordanian politician, minister of foreign affairs (1962–1965).
- Estela Rodríguez, 54, Cuban judoka, Olympic silver medallist (1992, 1996), cardiac arrest.
- Katherine Rogers, 67, American politician, member of the New Hampshire House of Representatives (2012–2022), cancer.
- Jos Schreurs, 87, Dutch Roman Catholic priest and politician, senator (1980–1981).
- Alexander Shkurko, 84, Russian historian, president of the State Historical Museum (1992–2010).
- Shiv Kumar Subramaniam, Indian actor (Mukti Bandhan) and screenwriter (Parinda, Hazaaron Khwaishein Aisi).
- Wang Senhao, 89, Chinese engineer and politician, governor of Shanxi (1983–1992).
- Desai Williams, 62, Canadian sprinter, Olympic bronze medalist (1984), heart attack.

=== 11 ===
- Len Allen, 90, British Olympic wrestler.
- Oleksandr Bakumenko, 62, Ukrainian politician, people's deputy (2014–2019).
- John D. Bransford, 78, American psychologist and educational theorist, lewy body dementia.
- Gary Bullock, 80, American actor (Twin Peaks: Fire Walk with Me, RoboCop 2, Species).
- Garrett Burnett, 46, Canadian ice hockey player (Mighty Ducks of Anaheim).
- Calvi, 83, French cartoonist, caricaturist and illustrator.
- Wayne Cooper, 65, American basketball player (Portland Trail Blazers, Denver Nuggets, Golden State Warriors), complications from kidney disease.
- Ihor Dybchenko, 61, Ukrainian footballer (Shakhtar Donetsk, Shakhtar Horlivka, Pivdenstal Yenakiieve).
- Mohammad Feyz Sarabi, 93, Iranian Islamic cleric and politician, member of the Assembly of Experts (since 2006).
- Gábor Görgey, 92, Hungarian writer and poet, minister of culture (2002–2003).
- Delores Ann Richburg Greene, 86, American educator.
- Eduardo Guardia, 56, Brazilian economist and politician, minister of finance (2018–2019).
- Mohammad Hussain, 45, Pakistani cricketer (national team).
- Hans Junkermann, 87, German racing cyclist.
- James Jupp, 89, British-Australian political scientist and author.
- Bill Ludwig, 87, Australian trade unionist.
- Joseph Makoju, 73, Nigerian engineer.
- Charnett Moffett, 54, American jazz bassist, heart attack.
- René Mornex, 94, French endocrinologist and academic.
- Chip Myrtle, 76, American football player (Denver Broncos).
- Timothy R. Parsons, 89, Canadian oceanographer.
- Claude Véga, 91, French impersonator, humorist and actor.

=== 12 ===
- Rogerio Azcárraga, 94, Mexican businessman.
- Simon de la Bretèche, 39, French pilot, plane crash.
- Sonny Caldinez, 89, Trinidadian actor (Doctor Who, The Fifth Element, Raiders of the Lost Ark).
- Sir Gordon Downey, 93, British public servant, parliamentary commissioner for standards (1995–1998).
- Olga Fiorini, 95, Italian businesswoman and educator.
- Gilbert Gottfried, 67, American comedian, television personality (Hollywood Squares), and actor (Aladdin, Cyberchase), ventricular tachycardia.
- Zvonimir Janko, 89, Croatian mathematician (Janko groups).
- Giorgos Katiforis, 87, Greek lawyer and academic, MEP (1994–2004).
- Larysa Khorolets, 73, Ukrainian actress, minister of culture (1991–1992).
- Susan Kilham, 79, American aquatic ecologist.
- Charles McCormick, 75, American musician (Bloodstone).
- Cedric McMillan, 44, American bodybuilder, heart attack.
- Doris Honig Merritt, 98, American physician.
- M. P. Govindan Nair, 94, Indian politician, Kerala MLA (1960–1964).
- Ray Rissmiller, 79, American football player (Philadelphia Eagles, New Orleans Saints, Buffalo Bills).
- Charles P. Roland, 104, American historian.
- Shirley Spork, 94, American professional golfer, co-founder of the LPGA.
- Traian Stănescu, 82, Romanian actor (Răscoala, Trandafirul galben, The Silver Mask).
- Billy Steuart, 85, South African Olympic swimmer.
- Henry S. Valk, 93, American physicist.
- Baptiste Vignes, 36, French pilot, plane crash.
- Irina Vorobieva, 63, Russian Olympic figure skater (1976).
- Sergei Yashin, 60, Russian ice hockey player (Dynamo Moscow, EHC Dynamo Berlin, HC Davos), Olympic champion (1988).
- Arne Zwaig, 75, Norwegian chess player.

=== 13 ===
- Letizia Battaglia, 87, Italian photographer.
- Michel Bouquet, 96, French actor (The Unfaithful Wife, The Bride Wore Black, Toto the Hero).
- Jorge Carreño Luengas, 92–93, Colombian judge, president of the Supreme Court (1990–1991).
- Johanna Ekström, 51, Swedish author and artist, cancer.
- Wolfgang Fahrian, 80, German footballer (Hertha BSC, Fortuna Köln, West Germany national team).
- Alex Gilady, 79, Israeli sports journalist and Olympic official, cancer.
- Francesco Glorioso, 79, Italian Olympic rower (1964).
- Josef Göppel, 71, German politician, MP (2002–2017).
- Laura Harris Hales, 54, American writer, historian, and podcaster, pancreatic cancer.
- Hua Wenyi, 81, Chinese Kunqu performer.
- Jimmy Leonard, 94, Irish politician, senator (1981–1982) and three-term TD.
- Maurice Lévy, 99, French physicist and teacher, president of the CNES (1973–1976).
- Lillian M. Lowery, 67–68, American school superintendent.
- David Luteijn, 78, Dutch politician, senator (1983–1995).
- Tom McCarthy, 61, Canadian ice hockey player (Minnesota North Stars, Boston Bruins) and coach, complications from heart surgery.
- Bill Nation, 96, American politician, member of the Wyoming House of Representatives (1965–1967) and mayor of Cheyenne, Wyoming (1962–1966, 1973–1977).
- Bob Neuenschwander, 73, American politician, member of the Minnesota House of Representatives (1983–1990).
- Gloria Parker, 100, American musician and bandleader.
- Freddy Rincón, 55, Colombian footballer (Corinthians, Real Madrid, national team), head injuries from traffic collision.
- Thomas Rosenlöcher, 74, German writer and poet.
- Vincent Ryan, 83, Australian Catholic priest and convicted sex offender.
- Colin Semper, 84, English Anglican priest.
- Dennis Stewart, 75, American basketball player (Michigan Wolverines, Baltimore Bullets, The Floridians).
- Jorge Trías, 73, Spanish lawyer, politician and whistleblower (Bárcenas affair), deputy (1996–2000), complications from COVID-19.
- Skip Walker, 67, American football player (Ottawa Rough Riders, Montreal Alouettes), cancer.
- Wang Yumei, 87, Chinese actress (Wreaths at the Foot of the Mountain, The Wooden Man's Bride, Justice Bao).

=== 14 ===
- Roberto Bendini, 76, Argentine military officer, chief of the general staff of the Army (2003–2008), pancreatic cancer.
- Alex Brenninkmeijer, 70, Dutch lawyer and academic, national ombudsman (2005–2014), member of the European Court of Auditors (since 2014).
- William Burgess, 91, Canadian Olympic sailor.
- Dennis Byars, 81, American politician, member of the Nebraska Legislature (1988–1995, 1999–2007).
- Irving Davidson, 92, Australian footballer (St Kilda).
- Gurbax Singh Frank, 86, Indian translator.
- Rio Hackford, 51, American actor (Treme, Jonah Hex, The Mandalorian), uveal melanoma.
- Chic Henry, 75, Australian car show organizer (Summernats), cancer.
- Ed Jasper, 49, American football player (Atlanta Falcons, Philadelphia Eagles, Oakland Raiders).
- Orlando Julius, 79, Nigerian saxophonist, singer and bandleader.
- Ilkka Kanerva, 74, Finnish politician, MP (since 1975), minister of labour (1991–1995), and deputy prime minister (1991).
- Cecily Littleton, 95, British crystallographer and horticulturalist, cardiac and respiratory arrest.
- Mak Ho Wai, 76, Hong Kong actor (The Romancing Star II, Faithfully Yours, The Banquet).
- Jack Newton, 72, Australian golfer.
- Kōji Omi, 89, Japanese politician, minister of finance (2006–2007).
- Joseph Pathalil, 85, Indian Roman Catholic prelate, bishop of Udaipur (1984–2012).
- Clay Reynolds, 72, American writer and literary critic, pancreatic cancer.
- Edward Morgan Rowell, 90, American diplomat, bullous pemphigoid.
- Manju Singh, 73, Indian television producer, heart attack.
- Con Sullivan, 93, English footballer (Bristol City, Arsenal).
- Trygve Thue, 71, Norwegian guitarist.

=== 15 ===
- Elizabeth Harris Aitken, 85, Welsh socialite.
- David G. Barber, 61, Canadian environmental scientist and academic.
- Mike Bossy, 65, Canadian Hall of Fame ice hockey player (New York Islanders), four-time Stanley Cup champion, lung cancer.
- Tony Brown, 86, Australian rugby league player (Newtown, Penrith, national team).
- Baidyanath Chakrabarty, 94, Indian gynaecologist and reproductive medicine researcher.
- Bob Chinn, 99, American restaurateur.
- Andy Coen, 57, American college football coach (Lehigh Mountain Hawks).
- Newton Cruz, 97, Brazilian military officer.
- Earl Devaney, 74, American law enforcement officer, inspector-general of the interior department (1999–2011).
- Bilquis Edhi, 74, Pakistani nurse and humanitarian, heart failure.
- Helle Fastrup, 70, Danish actress (Temporary Release), cancer.
- Lois Feinblatt, 100, American sex therapist
- Jean-Paul Fitoussi, 79, French economist.
- John S. Fossey, 44, British chemist.
- Bernhard Germeshausen, 70, German bobsledder, Olympic champion (1976, 1980).
- Bob Harrison, 80, American football player (Kent State) and coach (Atlanta Falcons, Pittsburgh Steelers).
- Severo Hernández, 81, Colombian Olympic cyclist (1968).
- Carlos López Riaño, 81, Spanish jurist and politician, deputy (1982–1996).
- Eunice Muñoz, 93, Portuguese actress (A Morgadinha dos Canaviais, Hard Times).
- Michael O'Kennedy, 86, Irish politician, minister for foreign affairs (1977–1979) and finance (1979–1980), TD (1965–2002).
- Henry Plumb, Baron Plumb, 97, British politician, member (1979–1999) and president (1987–1989) of the European Parliament, member of the House of Lords (1987–2017).
- Vlasta Pospíšilová, 87, Czech animator and director.
- Art Rupe, 104, American Hall of Fame music executive and record producer (Specialty Records).
- Liz Sheridan, 93, American actress (Seinfeld, ALF, Play the Game).
- Peter J. Swales, 73, Welsh historian of psychoanalysis.
- Kantoku Teruya, 76, Japanese politician, MP (1995–2001, 2003–2021), stomach cancer.

=== 16 ===
- Lembit Arro, 92, Estonian judge and politician, MP (1992–1999).
- J. N. Bhatt, 76, Indian jurist, justice of the Gujarat High Court (1990–2005) and chief justice of Patna High Court (2005–2007).
- Bill Bourne, 68, Canadian fiddler, guitarist (Tri-Continental) and songwriter, bladder cancer.
- James G. Crouse, 76, American politician.
- John Dougherty, 89, American Roman Catholic prelate, auxiliary bishop of Scranton (1995–2009).
- Elenore Freedman, 96, American educator, co-founder of The Derryfield School.
- Rosario Ibarra, 95, Mexican social activist and politician, senator (2006–2012).
- Rhoda Kadalie, 68, South African social activist, lung cancer.
- David Leeson, 64, American photojournalist.
- Mio Murao, 69, Japanese manga artist and writer.
- Mariano Ortiz, 77, Puerto Rican Olympic basketball player (1968, 1972, 1976).
- Nawal Kishore Rai, 62, Indian politician, MP (1991–1997, 1999–2004).
- Jon A. Reynolds, 84, American military officer.
- Wendy Rieger, 65, American news anchor (WRC-TV), glioblastoma.
- Gloria Sevilla, 90, Filipino actress (Bida si Mister, Bida si Misis, Once Upon a Time in Manila, Boy Golden: Shoot to Kill).
- Boyet Sison, 58, Filipino sportscaster, cardiac arrest.
- Joachim Streich, 71, German football player (Hansa Rostock, 1. FC Magdeburg, East Germany national team) and manager, Olympic bronze medalist (1972).
- Rosella Thorne, 91, Canadian Olympic sprinter (1952).
- Sir Ray Tindle, 95, British entrepreneur, founder of Tindle.
- Jon Wefald, 84, American academic administrator, president of Kansas State University (1986–2009), heart attack.
- Arthur Winther, 85, Australian Olympic diver (1956).
- Zippy Chippy, 30, American thoroughbred racehorse.

=== 17 ===
- Mireya Baltra, 90, Chilean journalist and politician, deputy (1969–1973) and minister of labor (1972).
- Eduardo Barbeiro, 90, Portuguese Olympic swimmer (1952).
- Ursula Bellugi, 91, German-born American cognitive neuroscientist.
- DJ Kay Slay, 55, American disc jockey and record executive, COVID-19.
- Gary Goodner, 72, Puerto Rican Olympic swimmer.
- Rada Granovskaya, 92, Russian psychologist.
- Jimmy Harris, 88, English footballer (Everton, Birmingham City, Oldham Athletic).
- Jim Hartz, 82, American journalist and television presenter (Today), COPD.
- Omer Kaleshi, 90, Macedonian painter.
- Prafulla Kar, 83, Indian musician, singer, and lyricist, cardiac arrest.
- William Kimbel, 68, American paleoanthropologist, cancer.
- Radu Lupu, 76, Romanian pianist.
- Kevin Meates, 92, New Zealand rugby union player (Canterbury, national team).
- Midnight Bourbon, 4, American thoroughbred racehorse, gastrointestinal disease.
- James Olson, 91, American actor (The Andromeda Strain, Commando, Rachel, Rachel).
- Gilles Remiche, 43, Belgian film director and actor (The Benefit of the Doubt, Working Girls, Madly in Life), cancer.
- Hollis Resnik, 67, American singer and actress (Backdraft), heart failure.
- N. Sankar, 76, Indian industrialist (Sanmar Group).
- Catherine Spaak, 77, Belgian-Italian actress (Kiss the Other Sheik, Il Sorpasso, Adultery Italian Style) and singer.
- Re Styles, 72, American singer (The Tubes).
- Ann Ter-Pogossian, 90, American painter.
- Rick Turner, 78, American luthier and guitarist (Autosalvage), heart failure and stroke.

=== 18 ===
- Lidiya Alfeyeva, 76, Russian long jumper, Olympic bronze medalist (1976).
- Noel Alford, 89, Australian footballer (North Melbourne).
- Nicholas Angelich, 51, American classical pianist, lung disease.
- Kenneth M. Baird, 99, Canadian physicist, metrologist and inventor.
- Piergiorgio Bellocchio, 90, Italian literary critic and writer.
- Sir Harrison Birtwistle, 87, English composer (The Triumph of Time, The Mask of Orpheus, The Minotaur).
- Wilfred Cass, 97, German-born British entrepreneur and arts philanthropist.
- Henry Delisle, 83, French academic and politician, deputy (1981–1986).
- Jerry Doucette, 70, Canadian rock singer, songwriter and guitarist, cancer.
- Valerio Evangelisti, 69, Italian novelist (Il castello di Eymerich).
- Graham Fyfe, 70, Scottish footballer (Rangers, Hibernian, Dumbarton).
- Bill Gatton, 89, American entrepreneur and philanthropist.
- Michel Goma, 90, French fashion designer, director of Balenciaga (1987–1992).
- Barbara Hall, 99, British crossword compiler and advice columnist.
- Leonid Heifetz, 87, Russian stage director and drama teacher.
- Andrzej Korzyński, 82, Polish composer (Man of Marble, The Birch Wood, Possession).
- Sid Mark, 88, American radio presenter.
- Janez Matičič, 95, Slovenian composer and pianist.
- Jean Meyer, 97, French historian.
- Seppo Nikkari, 74, Finnish Olympic runner (1972).
- Hermann Nitsch, 83, Austrian artist (Viennese Actionism).
- Pedro Pinto Rubianes, 91, Ecuadorian politician, vice president (2000–2003), minister of finance (1982–1984), MP (1998–2000).
- Rein Ratas, 83, Estonian politician, MP (2007–2011, 2015–2018).
- Shirō Sasaki, 83, Japanese anime and music producer, lung cancer.
- Piero Scesa, 83, Italian footballer (Novara, Torino, Mantova).
- Norm Suddon, 78, Scottish rugby union player (national team).
- Bridget Tan, 73, Singaporean migrant workers' rights advocate, founder of the Humanitarian Organization for Migration Economics.
- Thein Tun, 85, Burmese beverage executive and banker, founder of Tun Foundation Bank.
- Vyacheslav Trubnikov, 77, Russian intelligence officer, director of the Foreign Intelligence Service (1996–2000).
- Roger Undy, 83, British industrial relations scholar and academic.

=== 19 ===
- Ibrahim Aoudou, 66, Cameroonian Olympic footballer.
- Brad Ashford, 72, American politician, member of the U.S. House of Representatives (2015–2017), brain cancer.
- Garland Boyette, 82, American football player (Houston Oilers, St. Louis Cardinals, Montreal Alouettes).
- Robin Chan, 90, Hong Kong businessman.
- Paddy Flanagan, 92, Irish Gaelic footballer (St Loman's, Westmeath) and hurler (Westmeath).
- Gloria Gervitz, 79, Mexican poet and translator.
- Mike Gregory, 65, English darts player.
- Umang Gupta, 72, Indian-American entrepreneur, bladder cancer.
- Ellen Hancock, 79, American technology executive (IBM, National Semiconductor Corporation, Apple Inc.).
- Steven Heighton, 60, Canadian author and poet, cancer.
- Gert Hekma, 70, Dutch anthropologist and sociologist.
- Rolando Hinojosa-Smith, 93, American novelist, essayist and poet.
- Mosharraf Hossain, 40, Bangladeshi cricketer (Dhaka Division, Khulna Tigers, national team), brain cancer.
- Iqbal Muhammad Ali Khan, 64, Pakistani politician, MNA (since 2002), complications from heart surgery.
- Bob Latz, 91, American politician, member of the Minnesota House of Representatives (1959–1962, 1963–1966).
- Carlos Lucas, 91, Chilean boxer, Olympic bronze medallist (1956).
- John McKay, 82, British-Canadian mathematician (McKay conjecture, McKay graph).
- Ardina Moore, 91, American Quapaw-Osage fashion designer.
- Pan Jiluan, 94, Chinese scientist, president of Nanchang University (1993–2002) and member of the Chinese Academy of Sciences.
- Sandra Pisani, 63, Australian field hockey player, Olympic champion (1988), cancer.
- Samiur Rahman, 68, Bangladeshi cricketer (national team), brain cancer.
- Dede Robertson, 94, American evangelical Christian activist.
- Henry Scott-Stokes, 83, British journalist (Financial Times, The Times, The New York Times).
- Norman Surplus, 59, Northern Irish adventurer, first person to circumnavigate the world in an autogyro, cancer.
- Kane Tanaka, 119, Japanese supercentenarian, world's oldest person (since 2018).
- Freeman Williams, 65, American basketball player (San Diego Clippers, Atlanta Hawks, Utah Jazz).

=== 20 ===
- Philip Beidler, 77, American writer.
- Hilda Bernard, 101, Argentine actress (Rebelde Way, Floricienta).
- Ivan Bidnyak, 36, Ukrainian sport shooter and soldier, shot.
- Ian Brooks, 93, New Zealand politician, MP (1970–1975).
- Gino Burrini, 87, Italian Olympic alpine skier (1956).
- Barbara French, 95, American politician, member of the New Hampshire House of Representatives.
- Alan Garen, 96, American geneticist.
- Olle Goop, 78, Swedish trotting driver and trainer.
- Guitar Shorty, 87, American blues guitarist.
- Antonín Kachlík, 99, Czech film director (Já, truchlivý bůh, Princ Bajaja) and screenwriter.
- Javier Lozano Barragán, 89, Mexican Roman Catholic cardinal, bishop of Zacatecas (1984–1997) and president of the Pastoral Care of Health Care Workers (1996–2009).
- Gavin Millar, 84, Scottish film director (Dreamchild, Danny, the Champion of the World, Complicity), critic and television presenter.
- Read Morgan, 91, American actor (The Deputy, Gunsmoke, Back to the Future).
- Robert Morse, 90, American actor (How to Succeed in Business Without Really Trying, Tru, Mad Men), Tony winner (1962, 1990).
- T. Rama Rao, 83, Indian film director (Navaratri, Jeevana Tarangalu, Yeh To Kamaal Ho Gaya).
- Vundela Malakonda Reddy, 89, Indian writer and poet.
- Erwina Ryś-Ferens, 67, Polish four-time Olympic speed skater.
- Helen Spivey, 94, American politician and environmentalist.
- Nikola Stipanicev, 85, Croatian Olympic rower.
- Enver Yulgushov, 83, Russian football player (Zenit Leningrad) and manager (Rostselmash Rostov-on-Don, Torpedo Taganrog).

=== 21 ===
- Moslem Bahadori, 95, Iranian pathologist.
- Elspeth Barker, 81, British novelist and journalist, complications from a stroke.
- Carl Wayne Buntion, 78, American convicted murderer, execution by lethal injection.
- Jan Ceulemans, 96, Belgian Olympic basketball player.
- Eric Chappell, 88, English screenwriter (The Squirrels, Rising Damp, Home to Roost).
- Clive Collins, 80, British cartoonist and illustrator.
- Ralph DeLoach, 65, American football player (New York Jets).
- Volodymyr Denshchykov, 69, Ukrainian actor and artist.
- John DiStaso, 68, American journalist (New Hampshire Union Leader, WMUR-TV).
- David Friedland, 84, American politician and criminal, member of the New Jersey General Assembly (1966–1974) and Senate (1978–1980).
- Ali Hamsa, 66, Malaysian civil servant, chief secretary to the government (2012–2018).
- Renate Holm, 90, German-Austrian actress (The Count of Luxemburg) and operatic soprano (Vienna State Opera).
- Sir Geoffrey Howlett, 92, British army general, commander-in-chief of the Allied Forces Northern Europe (1986–1989).
- Huang Shuqin, 82, Chinese film director (A Soul Haunted by Painting, Sinful Debt).
- Aydın İlter, 91, Turkish military officer, general commander of the Gendarmerie (1993–1995).
- Mwai Kibaki, 90, Kenyan politician, president (2002–2013), vice president (1978–1988) and MP (1974–2013).
- Daryle Lamonica, 80, American football player (Oakland Raiders, Buffalo Bills, Southern California Sun).
- Iván Markó, 75, Hungarian dancer and choreographer.
- Frank Otway, 99, American basketball player (Chicago American Gears).
- Jacques Perrin, 80, French actor (Z, Black and White in Color, The Sleeping Car Murders) and filmmaker.
- Cynthia Plaster Caster, 74, American visual artist, cerebrovascular disease.
- John Rutherford, 92, Australian cricketer (Western Australia, national team).
- J. D. Rymbai, 87, Indian politician, chief minister of Meghalaya (2006–2007) and Meghalaya MLA (1983–1988, 1993–2008).
- J.W. Stoker, 94, American rodeo trick rider and stuntman (Bronco Billy).
- James R. Taylor, 93, Canadian academic.
- Kazumi Watanabe, 86, Japanese Olympic long-distance runner (1960, 1964).
- Adam Windsor, 41, English professional wrestler.
- Ronald J. Zlatoper, 80, American naval officer, U.S. Pacific Fleet commander (1994–1996).

=== 22 ===
- Lamidi Adeyemi III, 83, Nigerian traditional ruler, Alaafin of Oyo (since 1970).
- Marshall Arisman, 83, American illustrator, painter, and educator.
- Silvano Ciampi, 90, Italian racing cyclist.
- Dennis J. Gallagher, 82, American politician, member of the Colorado House of Representatives (1970–1974) and Senate (1974–1994).
- Walter Gwenigale, 87, Liberian politician, minister of health and social welfare (2006–2015).
- Guy Lafleur, 70, Canadian Hall of Fame ice hockey player (Montreal Canadiens, Quebec Nordiques, New York Rangers), five-time Stanley Cup champion, lung cancer.
- Marcus Leatherdale, 69, Canadian photographer.
- Curt Merz, 84, American football player (Dallas Texans/Kansas City Chiefs, Ottawa Rough Riders).
- Ted Prappas, 66, American racing driver (CART), colon cancer.
- Jan Rot, 64, Dutch singer, composer, and translator, colon cancer.
- Michelle Suárez Bértora, 39, Uruguayan politician and trans activist, senator (2014–2017).
- Pedrie Wannenburg, 41, South African rugby union player (Ulster, Oyonnax, national team), traffic collision.
- Clayton Weishuhn, 62, American football player (New England Patriots, Green Bay Packers), traffic collision.
- Håkan Winberg, 90, Swedish politician, MP (1971–1982) and minister for justice (1979–1981).
- Viktor Zvyahintsev, 71, Ukrainian footballer (Shakhtar Donetsk), Olympic bronze medallist (1976).

=== 23 ===
- Arno, 72, Belgian singer (TC Matic) and actor (Camping Cosmos), pancreatic cancer.
- Carmelo Borobia, 82, Spanish Roman Catholic prelate, bishop of Tarazona (1996–2004), auxiliary bishop of Toledo (2004–2010) and Zaragoza (1990–1996).
- Nse Ekpenyong, 58, Nigerian politician, member of the House of Representatives (since 2015).
- Justin Green, 76, American cartoonist (Binky Brown Meets the Holy Virgin Mary).
- Enoch Kelly Haney, 81, American sculptor, painter, and politician, member of the Oklahoma House of Representatives (1980–1986) and Senate (1986–2002), chief of the Seminole Nation of Oklahoma (2005–2009).
- Orrin Hatch, 88, American politician, senator (1977–2019) and president pro tempore of the U.S. Senate (2015–2019), complications from a stroke.
- Fuad El-Hibri, 64, German-American businessman and philanthropist, founder of Emergent BioSolutions.
- Philip J. Hilts, 74, American journalist and author, complications from liver disease.
- Johnnie Jones, 102, American soldier, civil rights lawyer and politician, member of the Louisiana House of Representatives (1972–1976).
- Milenko Kovačević, 58, Serbian footballer (Mačva Šabac, Rad, Apollon Athens).
- Sheldon Krimsky, 80, American bioethicist.
- Li Sanli, 86, Chinese engineer, member of the Chinese Academy of Engineering.
- Adrian Long, 81, Northern Irish civil engineer.
- Mike Sommer, 87, American football player (Washington Redskins, Baltimore Colts, Oakland Raiders).
- John Paul, 71, Indian screenwriter (Yathra, Sandhya Mayangum Neram, Kattathe Kilikkoodu), kidney disease.
- R. William Riggs, 83, American jurist, associate judge of the Oregon Supreme Court (1998–2006), complications from heart disease.
- Barbara Sansoni, 94, Sri Lankan artist, designer and writer (Barefoot).
- John Stofa, 79, American football player (Miami Dolphins, Cincinnati Bengals).
- Kenneth E. Stumpf, 77, American soldier, Medal of Honor recipient.
- Sheila Vaughan, 80, English amateur golfer.
- Dawie de Villiers, 81, South African rugby union player (Western Province, Boland Cavaliers, national team), cancer.
- Robert J. Warren, 88, American scientist and inventor.

=== 24 ===
- James Bama, 95, American artist and book cover illustrator (Doc Savage).
- Yvonne Blenkinsop, 83, English fishing safety campaigner.
- Frances Cherry, 84, New Zealand novelist.
- McCrae Dowless, 66, American political campaigner and convicted fraudster, lung cancer.
- Freddy Hall, 37, Bermudian footballer (Telford United, Limerick, national team), traffic collision.
- Chris Haughey, 96, American baseball player (Brooklyn Dodgers).
- Dimpal Kumari Jha, 42, Nepalese politician, MP (2013–2017) and Madhesh Province MPA (since 2018), colon cancer.
- Denis Kiwanuka Lote, 84, Ugandan Roman Catholic prelate, bishop of Kotido (1991–2007) and archbishop of Tororo (2007–2014).
- Kaushalya Madushani, 26, Sri Lankan hurdler, suicide by hanging.
- Sir Laurence Martin, 93, British academic.
- Josep Massot, 80, Spanish Roman Catholic monk, historian, and philologist.
- Kathy Mills, 86, Australian indigenous community leader and artist.
- Binapani Mohanty, 85, Indian novelist.
- Richie Moran, 85, American Hall of Fame lacrosse player and coach (Cornell Big Red).
- Willi Resetarits, 73, Austrian singer, comedian, and human rights activist, fall.
- K. Sankaranarayanan, 89, Indian politician, governor of Nagaland (2007–2008), Jharkhand (2009–2010) and Maharashtra (2010–2014), complications from a stroke.
- Ronald R. Van Stockum, 105, British-born American military officer.
- Rajesh Verma, 40, Indian cricketer (Mumbai), cardiac arrest.
- M. Vijayan, 80, Indian structural biologist, president of the National Science Academy (2007–2010).
- Collin Williams, 60, Zimbabwean cricketer (Matabeleland).
- Quency Williams, 61, American football player (Calgary Stampeders, Winnipeg Blue Bombers), heart attack.
- Francis Wilson, 82, South African economist.
- Andrew Woolfolk, 71, American Hall of Fame saxophonist (Earth, Wind & Fire).

=== 25 ===
- Hannes Adomeit, 79, German political scientist.
- Robert Archambeau, 89, Canadian ceramic artist and potter.
- Thomas Broadwater, 87, American politician.
- Edward J. Bronson, 91, American political scientist.
- Marc G. Caron, 75, Canadian-born American biologist.
- Mohammad-Ali Eslami Nodooshan, 97, Iranian literary critic, translator and poet.
- Alabo Graham-Douglas, 82, Nigerian politician, minister of aviation (1990–1992), labour (1999–2000) and culture (2000–2001).
- Bente Hansen, 82, Danish writer and women's rights activist.
- Susan Jacks, 73, Canadian singer-songwriter (The Poppy Family) and record producer, kidney disease.
- Kostas Karapatis, 94, Greek football player (Olympiacos, national team) and manager (Doxa Drama).
- Marguerite Kleven, 91, American politician.
- Bob LaRose, 76, Canadian football player (Winnipeg Blue Bombers) and coach (Western Mustangs), heart attack.
- Ursula Lehr, 91, German gerontologist and politician, minister of family affairs (1989–1991) and MP (1990–1994).
- Hossein Mollaghasemi, 89, Iranian Olympic wrestler (1960, 1964).
- Morton Mower, 89, American cardiologist, cancer.
- Salvatore Pica, 83, Italian art collector, COVID-19.
- Mike Preaseau, 86, American college basketball player (San Francisco Dons).
- Rha Woong-bae, 87, South Korean politician, minister of finance (1982) and deputy prime minister (1988).
- J. Roy Rowland, 96, American politician, member of the U.S. House of Representatives (1983–1995) and Georgia House of Representatives (1976–1982).
- Jimmy Thomas, 83, American soul singer (Kings of Rhythm), respiratory failure.
- Henny Vrienten, 73, Dutch singer-songwriter and composer (Doe Maar).
- Geraldine Weiss, 96, American investor.
- Corey Wittenberg, 60, American-born Australian tennis player.
- Shane Yellowbird, 42, Canadian country singer.

=== 26 ===
- Peter Ackerman, 75, American businessman, founder of Americans Elect and the International Center on Nonviolent Conflict.
- Luke Allen, 43, American baseball player (Los Angeles Dodgers, Colorado Rockies).
- Richard Beaumont, 60, British actor (Scrooge).
- Inge Bernstein, 91, Austrian-born English judge.
- Eileen Bransten, 79, American judge.
- Elvera Britto, 81, Indian field hockey player (national team).
- Jack Cakebread, 92, American winemaker, founder of Cakebread Cellars.
- Julie Daraîche, 83, Canadian singer.
- Ann Davies, 87, English actress (Doctor Who, Peter's Friends, The Sculptress).
- Anne-Marie Demortière, 84, French Olympic gymnast (1960).
- Daniel Dolan, 70, American Catholic sedevacantist bishop (since 1993).
- George D. Gould, 94, American financier and banker, under secretary of the Treasury (1985–1988).
- İsmail Ogan, 89, Turkish wrestler, Olympic champion (1964), multiple organ failure.
- Klaus Schulze, 74, German electronic musician (Tangerine Dream, Ash Ra Tempel, The Cosmic Jokers) and composer.
- Peter Vickery, 72, Australian lawyer, judge of the Supreme Court of Victoria (2008–2018), cancer.

=== 27 ===
- Carlos Amigo Vallejo, 87, Spanish Roman Catholic cardinal, archbishop of Seville (1982–2009) and Tanger (1973–1982), heart failure.
- LeRoy Armstrong, 85, Canadian politician, New Brunswick MLA (1995–1999, 2003–2006).
- David Birney, 83, American actor (St. Elsewhere, Bridget Loves Bernie, Oh, God! Book II) and stage director, complications from Alzheimer's disease.
- Shahzada Mohiuddin, 83, Pakistani politician, MNA (1985–1988) and minister of excise and taxation (1990).
- Nagaenthran K. Dharmalingam, 33, Malaysian drug trafficker, execution by hanging.
- Bob Elkins, 89, American actor (Coal Miner's Daughter, The Dream Catcher).
- Carlos García Cambón, 73, Argentine footballer (Chacarita Juniors, Boca Juniors, Unión de Santa Fe), complications from ruptured abdominal aneurysm.
- John Gwitira, 72, Zimbabwean political activist, chairman of the National Liberation War Veterans Association (1989–1997).
- Judy Henske, 85, American folk singer ("High Flying Bird").
- Jossara Jinaro, 48, Brazilian-American actress (Judging Amy, East Los High).
- Nikolai Leonov, 93, Russian KGB officer and politician, deputy (2003–2007).
- Adam Lepa, 83, Polish Roman Catholic prelate and theologian, auxiliary bishop of Łódź (1988–2014).
- Liao Guoxun, 59, Chinese politician, delegate to the NPC (2008–2013, since 2017) and mayor of Tianjin (since 2020).
- Kristian Lundberg, 56, Swedish author.
- Maria L. Marcus, 88, Austrian-born American lawyer.
- Jack Morris, 90, American football player (Los Angeles Rams, Pittsburgh Steelers, Minnesota Vikings).
- Shirley Nelson, 96, American author.
- Rich Pahls, 78, American politician, member of the Nebraska Legislature (2005–2013, since 2021) and Omaha City Council (2013–2021), complications from cancer.
- Bernard Pons, 95, French politician, four-time deputy, minister of transport (1995–1997), and Paris councillor (1983–2008).
- Gene Santoro, 71, American music journalist, esophageal cancer.
- Bryan Saunders, 69, Canadian Olympic sprinter (1976, 1984).
- Victor Serrano, 78, French rugby league player (Saint-Gaudens Bears, national team).
- Kenneth Tsang, 86, Hong Kong actor (A Better Tomorrow, The Killer, Once a Thief).
- David Walden, 79, American computer scientist (IMP, ARPANET), lymphoma.
- Desmond Zwar, 90, Australian author.

=== 28 ===
- Neal Adams, 80, American comic book artist (Batman, Superman vs. Muhammad Ali, Green Lantern), complications from sepsis.
- John Bosley, 74, Canadian politician, MP (1979–1993) and speaker of the House of Commons (1984–1986), heart failure.
- Tanya Brady, 49, British rower, equestrian accident.
- Peter Brandt, 90, British Olympic rower (1952).
- Tom Cunningham, 91, Irish hurler.
- Juan Diego, 79, Spanish actor (The Dumbfounded King, Go Away from Me, Los hombres de Paco).
- Jean-Claude Fruteau, 74, French politician, deputy (2007–2017), MEP (1999–2007), and mayor of Saint-Benoît, Réunion (since 2008).
- Salim Ghouse, 70, Indian actor (Subah, Bharat Ek Khoj, Wagle Ki Duniya).
- Ronald K. Hambleton, 78, American academic and psychometrician.
- Vira Hyrych, 54, Ukrainian journalist and radio producer (Radio Free Europe/Radio Liberty), missile strike.
- Harold James, 79, American politician, member of the Pennsylvania House of Representatives (1989–2008, 2012–2013).
- Harold Livingston, 97, American novelist and screenwriter (Star Trek: The Motion Picture, The Hell with Heroes).
- M. A. Mannan, 72, Bangladeshi politician, MP (1991–1995) and mayor of Gazipur (1991–1996, 2013–2018).
- Hugh McDevitt, 91, American immunologist.
- Steve McMillan, 80, American politician, member of the Alabama House of Representatives (since 1980), brain cancer.
- Dan Mofokeng, 62, South African politician and businessman, Member of the Gauteng Executive Council for Housing (1994–1999).
- Susan Nussbaum, 68, American actress and disability rights activist, complications from pneumonia.
- George Papach, 97, American football player (Pittsburgh Steelers).
- Ian Pool, 85, New Zealand demographer.
- Charles T. Prewitt, 89, American mineralogist and solid state chemist.
- Fernando Sáenz Lacalle, 89, Spanish Roman Catholic prelate, archbishop of San Salvador (1995–2008).
- Zoran Sretenović, 57, Serbian basketball player (Crvena zvezda, Jugoplastika) and coach (Železničar Inđija), European champion (1991, 1995), heart attack.
- Mendes Thame, 75, Brazilian politician, deputy (1987–1993, 1999–2019) and mayor of Piracicaba (1993–1997).
- Larry Woiwode, 80, American writer.

=== 29 ===
- Erich Barnes, 86, American football player (Chicago Bears, New York Giants, Cleveland Browns).
- Joanna Barnes, 87, American actress (Auntie Mame, Tarzan, the Ape Man, The Parent Trap) and writer.
- Georgia Benkart, 74, American mathematician, lung cancer.
- Allen Blairman, 81, American jazz drummer.
- Maria Antònia Canals, 91, Spanish mathematician and pedagogist.
- Choijinzhab, 91, Chinese linguist.
- John Cooke, 77–78, Irish judge.
- David A. Evans, 81, American chemist.
- Walter S. Felton Jr., 77, American judge.
- Robert Goolrick, 73, American writer, complications from COVID-19.
- Clive Griffiths, 67, Welsh footballer (Kansas City Comets, Chicago Sting, Tranmere Rovers).
- Tengku Ahmad Rithauddeen Ismail, 94, Malaysian politician, MP (1969–1990), minister of defence (1987–1990) and foreign affairs (1975–1981, 1984–1986), stroke.
- Roberto Lecaros, 77, Chilean jazz musician and composer.
- Andrew G. McBride, 61, American attorney.
- Peter Moore, 78, American shoe designer (Nike, Inc.).
- Donald Peck, 92, American flutist.
- Roland Robertson, 83, English sociologist.
- Walter Rossi, 74, Italian-Canadian guitarist (Influence, Luke & The Apostles), lung cancer.
- Tarsame Singh Saini, 54, British singer.
- Ivan Snehota, 75–76, Italian organizational theorist. (death announced on this date)
- Nader Talebzadeh, 68, Iranian film director (The Messiah), heart failure.
- George Yanok, 83, American television writer and producer (Hee Haw, Welcome Back, Kotter, The Stockard Channing Show), Emmy winner (1974, 1976), lung cancer.

=== 30 ===
- Allister Adel, 45, American lawyer, county attorney of Maricopa County, Arizona (2019–2022).
- Ricardo Alarcón, 84, Cuban politician, minister of foreign affairs (1992–1993) and president of the National Assembly of People's Power (1993–2013).
- Frank J. Anderson, 83–84, American police officer, sheriff of Marion County, Indiana (2003–2011).
- Lee Brayton, 88, American racing driver and engine builder.
- Neil Campbell, 45, English footballer (Doncaster Rovers, Scarborough, Barrow).
- DJ Delete, 30, Australian DJ and music producer, overdose.
- Ray Fenwick, 75, English guitarist (The Spencer Davis Group, Ian Gillan Band).
- Ron Galella, 91, American paparazzo, heart failure.
- Marthe Gautier, 96, French physician.
- Khun Htun Oo, 78, Burmese political activist.
- Naomi Judd, 76, American Hall of Fame country singer (The Judds) and songwriter ("Change of Heart", "Love Can Build a Bridge"), suicide by gunshot.
- Waqar Ahmad Khan, 54, Pakistani politician, MPA (since 2018), cardiac arrest.
- Bob Krueger, 86, American diplomat and politician, member of the U.S. House of Representatives (1975–1979) and Senate (1993), ambassador to Botswana (1996–1999).
- Abul Maal Abdul Muhith, 88, Bangladeshi economist and politician, minister of finance (2009–2019) and MP (2009–2018).
- Lyubov Panchenko, 84, Ukrainian visual artist and fashion designer, starvation.
- Mino Raiola, 54, Italian football agent (Pavel Nedvěd, Paul Pogba, Zlatan Ibrahimović).
- Max Riebl, 30, Australian countertenor, cancer.
- Gabe Serbian, 44, American hardcore punk drummer and guitarist (The Locust, Dead Cross).
- Haruo Shimada, 81, Japanese magician.
- Ülo Tulik, 64, Estonian agronomist and politician, governor of Võru County (2005–2010).
