= Jin Di =

Jin Di may refer to:

- Jin Di (translator) (1921–2008), Chinese translator
- Jin Di (actress) (1933–2022), Chinese actress, director and screenwriter
- Jin Di (sport shooter) (born 1978), Chinese sport shooter
