= Paulo França =

Brazilian politician (1952–2022)

Member of the Legislative Assembly of Santa Catarina
- In office 2011–2015

Personal details
- Born: 28 February 1952; Curitiba, Brazil
- Died: 2 April 2022 (aged 70); Blumenau, Brazil
- Political party: PMDB

Paulo França (28 February 1952 – 2 April 2022) was a Brazilian politician. A member of the Brazilian Democratic Movement, he served in the Legislative Assembly of Santa Catarina from 2011 to 2015. He died of cancer in Blumenau on 2 April 2022 at the age of 70.
