= Vernon Scoville =

American politician (1953–2022)

Vernon E. Scoville III (August 17, 1953 – April 4, 2022) was an American politician and judge.

== Life ==
Scoville was born in Kansas City, Missouri, and graduated from Ruskin High School in Kansas City, in 1971. He served in the United States Army during the Vietnam War. Scoville received his Juris Doctor degree from University of Missouri–Kansas City School of Law. Scoville was elected to the Missouri House of Representatives in 1982, and served until October 1991, when he resigned to become an associate judge for the Missouri Circuit Court of Jackson County. He stepped down as a judge in 2013. He died at his home in Blue Springs, Missouri.
