= Ihor Dashko =

Ukrainian border guard (1977–2022)

Ihor Tarasovych Dashko (Ukrainian: Ігор Тарасович Дашко; born 18 June 1977, Sambir, Ukrainian SSR – died 9 April 2022, Mariupol, Ukraine) was a Ukrainian military officer, a lieutenant colonel border guard of the State Border Service of Ukraine and a participant of the Russo-Ukrainian war.

He was awarded the Hero of Ukraine posthumously on April 17, 2022.

== Biography ==
Ihor Dashko was born on June 18, 1977, in Sambir, in the Ukrainian SSR.

He studied at the Secondary School No. 1 named after Taras Shevchenko, in Sambir, from which he graduated in 1994.

After graduating from the Academy of the State Border Service of Ukraine in 1999, he started working in the city of Mariupol, in the Department of the State Border Service of Ukraine.

From the summer of 2012 to January 2022, he served in the Western Regional Department of the State Security Service.

A month before the Russian invasion of Ukraine, he again moved to the city of Mariupol.

=== Death ===
On April 9, 2022, he blew himself up at a radio station in Mariupol so that it would not reach by the Russian invaders.

His last words on the radio were "Glory to Ukraine!".

== Awards ==
- The title of «Hero of Ukraine» with the award of the «Golden Star» order (April 17, 2022, posthumously) — for personal courage and heroism, shown in the defense of state sovereignty and territorial integrity of Ukraine, selfless service to the Ukrainian people.

== Sources ==
- Kovalenko, S. The heroic feat of border guard Dashka will be written in golden letters in the history of the Ukrainian people and the defense of Mariupol // ArmyInform. — 2022. — April 20.

== Links ==
- Героїчний подвиг прикордонника буде вписаний золотими літерами в історію українського народу on YouTube // Державна прикордонна служба України. — 2022. — 18 квітня.
- https://www.youtube.com/watch?v=BY3dflo9dpE
- (VIDEO) Heroic feat of border guard will be written in golden letters in the history of Ukrainian people and defense of Mariupol. State Border Guard Service of Ukraine
- https://www.youtube.com/watch?v=UGgwS5A-57I
- https://www.youtube.com/watch?v=SUtz0VY-XRw
