= Haruo Shimada =

Japanese magician (1940–2022)

- Born: Haruo Shimada; December 19, 1940; Tokyo, Japan
- Died: April 30, 2022 (aged 81); Los Angeles, California, United States
- Occupation: Magician
- Years active: 1957–2022
- Spouse(s): Deanna Perkins (m. 1965; div. 1997) Keiley Walters (m. 1998)
- Children: 2, including Luna (Lisa) Shimada

Haruo Shimada (December 19, 1940 – April 30, 2022) was a Japanese magician known for his elegant and classical performance style. Throughout his career, he performed silently, using his expressive eyes and precise movements to captivate audiences worldwide. He was particularly renowned for his innovative parasol and dove acts.

== Early life ==
Haruo Shimada was born on December 19, 1940, in Tokyo, Japan. His interest in magic began at the age of 15 when he discovered a Tenyo Magic counter at a local department store in Tokyo. Due to crowded schools in post-war Tokyo, Shimada attended classes at night, which allowed him to work during the day demonstrating magic tricks at various Tenyo Magic Corners in Mitsukoshi department stores throughout Tokyo.

Under the guidance of Tenyo, Shimada developed his foundational skills in close-up magic. His early training was significantly influenced by three major Japanese magical traditions: Tenyo, Tenkō, and Tenkai. In 1957, the Grand Master of Japanese magic, Tenkai Ishida, returned to Japan after spending 30 years in America, and Shimada began taking lessons from him, further refining his sleight of hand techniques.

== Career ==
=== Early career in Japan ===
Shimada made his professional debut at the age of 17 with a Billiard Ball Routine. His talent was quickly recognized, and he was invited to perform a command performance for Emperor Hirohito of Japan in 1960, alongside his mentor Tenkō Hikita.

A pivotal moment in Shimada's career came when he was 19 years old and saw the American magician Channing Pollock in the 1959 film "European Nights." Inspired by Pollock's elegant dove act and charismatic stage presence, Shimada began developing his own dove magic. Working independently from Pollock's methods, he created several innovative techniques, including his bare hand production of a dove on a cane, a dove appearing on a fan of cards, and the splitting of a dove in two. He debuted this act in 1961.

=== International career ===
In 1965, Shimada left Japan to tour Mexico and Australia. While in Australia, he met Deanna Perkins, who would become both his stage assistant and his first wife. They married in October 1965 and formed a highly respected performing team. Together, they toured twenty countries over three years.

During their time in Mexico, Shimada began developing his parasol act, drawing inspiration from his Japanese heritage to create what would become one of his signature performances.

=== American success ===
Shimada and Deanna moved to the United States in 1970, where he premiered his oriental-style Parasol Act. His American debut came in 1971 at Milt Larsen's "It's Magic!" show in Los Angeles. Channing Pollock, who had been Shimada's early inspiration, saw his performance and approached him about becoming his personal manager, providing valuable guidance throughout Shimada's career.

Following his appearance in "It's Magic!", Shimada became a regular performer at the Magic Castle in Hollywood, where he developed the somewhat mysterious and intense "samurai style" that became synonymous with his stage persona. Bill Larsen, co-founder of the Magic Castle, was particularly impressed by Shimada's dove act, describing it as "the greatest dove act I have ever seen."

Shimada's talent quickly gained national recognition, and later in 1971, he made the first of four appearances on "The Tonight Show with Johnny Carson." He also appeared on "The Dick Cavett Show," "The Merv Griffin Show," and with Bill Cosby, establishing himself as a major figure in American entertainment.

In 1975, Shimada enhanced his parasol act by adding a spectacular finale: a 60-foot fire-breathing dragon transposition. In this dramatic sequence, after producing a multitude of colorful parasols, he would battle gigantic dragons in a mythical tale set against a kabuki theater backdrop.

=== Las Vegas and international stardom ===
Shimada's career reached new heights in the early 1980s when he was contracted to be the featured specialty act in Liberace's spectacular Las Vegas show at the Hilton in 1981-1982. He performed in numerous prestigious venues in Las Vegas, including the Flamingo, the Hilton, and the Stardust, where he replaced Siegfried & Roy in the "Lido de Paris" show.

In 1988, Shimada began a five-year run as the star of the "Splash" show at the Riviera Hotel in Las Vegas. He made history as the first Japanese entertainer to star in a Las Vegas production show for an extended multiple-year contract.

Throughout his career, Shimada performed on the most prestigious stages globally, including the London Palladium and the Olympia in Paris. Four television specials in Japan were filmed around him in 1989, further cementing his international star status.

=== Later career ===
In 1993, exhausted from his lengthy Vegas contracts, Shimada decided to return to his roots in Japan. Leaving his family in Las Vegas, he returned to Tokyo to mentor several young performers in the techniques he had created. In 1998, Shimada returned to America, performing his Parasol/Dragon and Dove Acts with his new wife, Keiley. He continued to delight audiences across the United States and Europe with his immaculate performances.

== Personal life ==
Shimada married Deanna Perkins in October 1965 after meeting her in Australia. Their daughter Lisa (who later became known professionally as Luna Shimada) was born in 1966, and their son Jason was born in 1979. Later in life, Shimada married his second wife, Keiley.

Throughout his career, Shimada never spoke on stage, presenting a dramatic silent act. He created a unique performance style that captivated audiences worldwide.

== Death and legacy ==
Haruo Shimada died on April 30, 2022, at the age of 81. He is survived by his wife Keiley Shimada, daughter Luna Shimada, son Jason Shimada, and grandchildren Tara, Adam, and Ione Shimada Losander.

Shimada's legacy in the magic world is profound. He was a pioneer of stage manipulation and parasol magic who changed the art form forever. His daughter, Luna Shimada, continues the family tradition with her own successful career in magic.

== Awards and recognition ==
Throughout his career, Shimada received numerous awards and recognitions, including:

- Academy of Magical Arts (AMA) Visiting Magician of the Year (1972)
- AMA Magician of the Year (1973, 1974, 1976)
- Tenkai Prize (1975)
- AMA Performing Fellowship (1989)

== Publications ==
- Shimada Haruo no Bon (The Book of Haruo Shimada) (1977)
