= Elenore Freedman =

American educator (1926–2022)

- Born: January 15, 1926
- Died: April 16, 2022 (aged 96)

Academic background
- Education: Radcliffe College

Elenore S. Freedman (January 15, 1926 - April 16, 2022) was an American educator. She was called the "dean" of educational reform and advocacy in New Hampshire, is a former New Hampshire education executive and was a co-founder of The Derryfield School in Manchester, New Hampshire. In 1990, Freedman received the Granite State Award for Outstanding Public Service from the University of New Hampshire, and she was included in Notables in NH as one of 422 people who "helped shape the character of the state."

== Early life ==
Born in 1926 to Benjamin and Dora (Markovitz) Finklestein, Freedman graduated from Brockton High School (Massachusetts) in 1943 and Radcliffe College (B.A.) in 1947. She married Peter S. Freedman in 1947.

== Career ==
=== Early volunteer work ===
Living in Marion, Massachusetts, she co-founded (as a volunteer) the local chapter of the League of Women Voters, and was elected its first president.

=== NH Council for Better Schools (1957 - 1969) ===
Moving to Bedford, New Hampshire, she became Executive Director of the New Hampshire Council for Better Schools in 1957. During this time, she:

- Published The Upper Quarter (a study by Margaret Ronzone Cusick) in 1959, a three-year study of the top 25 per cent of New Hampshire high school graduates. The study, a subject of subsequent conferences, showed that nearly half of the top quarter of all high school seniors in New Hampshire didn't attend college, and over 15 percent of this group did not even graduate from high school. The survey further showed that while there were almost twice as many girls as boys in the top quarter, more than two thirds of those boys went to college while less than half of the girls did.
- Was appointed by New Hampshire Governor John W. King in 1965 to a delegation representing New Hampshire at the 1966 Governors' Conference to draft an inter-state compact on education sponsored by the Study of American States and led by Terry Sanford, former governor of North Carolina. The resulting recommendations, published in 1966, included the development of "a master plan for school district reorganization", a minimum teacher's salary, expansion of vocational training, and a compulsory kindergarten program for all public school pupils. The recommendations were promoted by King in addresses, discussed on NH television, and endorsed by the NH Schools Boards Association (which Freedman would later lead) as well as the New Hampshire Education Association (representing 6,000 state teachers).
- Represented the group, lobbying on behalf of issues important to New Hampshire education.

=== NH School Boards Association (1970 - 1974) ===
In 1970, Freedman became program coordinator, publications director and administrative assistant for the Center for Educational Field Services (a joint office of the N.H. School Boards Association and the University of New Hampshire). While there, she coordinated an annual education conference (co-sponsored by the four state Associations of School Boards and which featured keynote speakers such as Ralph Nader), and lobbied on behalf of issues impacting education.

=== NH Association of School Principals (1974 – 1988) ===
In 1974, Freedman was appointed Executive Director of the newly formed NH Association of School Principals, which merged the two former Associations of Elementary and Secondary School Principals. The association ran state-wide conferences and workshops for New Hampshire school principals, sometimes as joint conferences with the NH School Boards Association. These conferences provided training as well as a forum to discuss some of the most pressing educational issues at that time. As director, Freedman also lobbied in Concord and in the media on behalf of New Hampshire education-related legislation.

=== Association for Effective Schools / School Improvement Program (1988 – 1991) ===
In 1988, Freedman was chosen to be director of the newly formed NH School Improvement Program, directed by the NH Alliance for Effective Schools.

This program was offered to New Hampshire schools as a collaborative venture by 19 educational, business and governmental organizations, including the New Hampshire legislature, the N.H. Charitable Fund, the Federation of Teachers, the N.H. Leadership in Educational Administration Development (LEAD) Center, the Business and Industry Association, the University System of New Hampshire, and local school districts.

Freedman retired from the program in 1991 but it continued through its two-year term. At its 1993 Governor and Executive Council meeting, the contract was awarded to a private consulting firm, primarily citing its "...method for evaluating schools." SIP was, however, given a "continued voice and role" in the program. Two years later, the program was eliminated from the NH budget.

== The Derryfield School ==
Along with her husband Peter, Elenore Freedman was a founder of the Derryfield School in Manchester, New Hampshire, a private, independent, non-sectarian, college preparatory day school, serving families in southern New Hampshire. Elenore Freedman had known R. Philip Hugny from the NH Council for Better Schools, and he was recruited as the first headmaster of Derryfield.

The school opened in September 1965 with 108 students and 11 faculty members. Classes were initially held in space rented from the Manchester Institute of Arts and Science and the nearby Boys Club. The school then bought 10 acres (4.0 ha) of land on River Road and moved to newly built facilities on this land in 1967.

As of 2019, Derryfield had grown to serve nearly 400 students from grades 6-12 with a student/faculty ration of 8/1 and an average class size of 15. The school campus has grown to 84 acres (34 ha).

== Awards and citations ==
- Freedman was included in Notables in NH, a book published by the New Hampshire Historical Society, as one of 422 people who "helped shape the character of the state."
- In 1990, she was awarded the Granite State Award for Outstanding Public Service from the University of New Hampshire, in recognition of her substantial contributions to the quality of education in New Hampshire during the last 40 years.
