= Dejo Tunfulu =

Nigerian actor (1972–2022)

- Born: Kunle Makinde Adetokunbo; May 31, 1972; Abeokuta, near Lagos, Nigeria
- Died: April 1, 2022 (aged 49)
- Citizenship: Nigerian
- Education: Nigeria school of printing
- Occupations: Actor, comedian
- Years active: 1987–2022
- Known for: Apere Ijongbon, Yemi my Lover, Ejide, Ito, Hally the Drummer, Jide Jendo

Kunle Adetokunbo (31 May 1972 – 1 April 2022) was a Nigerian actor popularly known as Dejo Tunfulu//.

== Background ==
Adetokunbo was born in Idumota, near Lagos, Ogun State, and hailed from Ikija Abeokuta. He attended Ansar-Ud-Deen primary school in Lagos and went further to obtain a certificate in printing from Modern Way Nigeria School of Printing.

His career started in 1987 in a television series titled ‘Apere Ijongbon.’ He got his nickname ‘Dejo Tunfulu’ by acting as a stammerer in comic roles. Another source says he began his acting career in the television program 'Theatre Omode' and became known by the name Dejo in the movie 'Aje ni Iya mi,' in which he played the role of Dejo.

== Filmography ==
- Apere Ijongbon (1987)
- Yemi, my Lover (1993)
- Ejide (2007)
- Ito (2008)
- Hally The Drummer (2016)
- Jide Jendo (2020)
