= Bob Gray (footballer, born 1923) =

English footballer (1923–2022)

Personal information
- Full name: Robert Gray
- Date of birth: 14 December 1923
- Place of birth: Newcastle upon Tyne, England
- Date of death: 8 April 2022 (aged 98)
- Position: Goalkeeper

Youth career
- Whitehall Juniors
- Newcastle United

Senior career*
Years	Team	Apps	(Gls)
1944–1959	Gateshead	432	(0)
	Ashington	?	(?)
	North Shields	?	(?)
- * Club domestic league appearances and goals

Robert Gray (14 December 1923 – 8 April 2022) was an English footballer who played as a goalkeeper. Gray started his career with Whitehall Juniors and Newcastle United before joining Gateshead in 1944. He made 432 league appearances and 28 appearances in the FA Cup for Gateshead (as well as 57 appearances in the wartime league) before spells at non-league Ashington and North Shields. Gray died on 8 April 2022, at the age of 98.

== Sources ==
- "allfootballers.com".
- "Post War English & Scottish Football League A–Z Player's Transfer Database".
