= Li Sanli =

Chinese computer scientist (1935–2022)

- 李三立
- Born: 24 August 1935; Shanghai, China
- Died: 23 April 2022 (aged 86); Beijing, China
- Education: Tsinghua University; Soviet Academy of Sciences
- Scientific career
- Fields: Computer
- Workplaces: Tsinghua University; Shanghai University

Li Sanli (Chinese: 李三立; pinyin: Lǐ Sānlì; 24 August 1935 – 23 April 2022) was a Chinese computer scientist and also an academician of the Chinese Academy of Engineering (CAE), professor of Tsinghua University, dean and professor of School of Computer Engineering and Science in Shanghai University.

== Biography ==
Li was born into a highly educated family in Shanghai, on 24 August 1935. His name "Sanli" (三立) comes from Zuo Zhuan (左传) and means "three Immortalities of speech, morality and meritorious service". In 1951, he entered Tsinghua University, majoring in the Radio Electronics Department. After graduation, he stayed at the university and worked at there. He began graduate work at Soviet Academy of Sciences in 1956 and earned his vice-doctorate under the advisement of C. A. Lebedev in 1960.

He returned to China in 1960 and continued to teach at Tsinghua University. In 1961, he became leader of the Operation Control Group of Tsinghua University for developing electronic tube computer 911. In 1972, he was responsible for developing a 724 computer system with small and medium-sized integrated circuits as the main components. In 1988, he concurrently served as dean of the School of Computer Engineering and Science, Shanghai University. In 2000, he was responsible for the successful development of the cluster system "Ziqiang 2000" with 220 processors in Shanghai University. In August 2003, he developed a "Shenchao 21C" supercomputer with 256 CPUs and a peak speed of 1.5 trillion times for Shenzhen University. In 2004, his research team cooperated with Hewlett-Packard to complete a supercomputer "Shangda Ziqiang 3000" with a total of 352 CPUs and a peak speed of more than 2 trillion times in Shanghai University.

On 23 April 2022, he died of an illness in Beijing, at the age of 86.

== Contributions ==
Li was one of China's pioneers in computer science and engineering. He has won many domestic awards for research in the fields of computer architecture and organization. The achievement of "cluster- based high performance computer Ziqian2000," which was organized by Li at Shanghai University, won the First Grade Award from the government of Shanghai in 2001. In addition, the president of Hong Kong Polytechnic University offered him the university's Outstanding Scholar Award in 1995.

Li has published 12 books and more than 100 papers in key journals and at international conferences. Of these, his book "RISC-Single and Multiple Issuing Architecture" won the Special Grade Award for Excellent Academic Books conferred by State Education Commission.

Li was also a deputy director of the Information Technology Consultant Committee of Shanghai Municipal Government and executive director of the Chinese Computer Federation. He was the chief scientist on the High Performance Computing project of the State Climbing Program from 1995 to 2000 and has served as co-chairperson in Computer Disciplines of the Academic Degree Committee of the China State Council. He was elected vice-president and president of the IEEE Mainland Section separately in 1993/1994 and 1995/1996. He was also elected seven times to serve on the board of directors of EUROMICRO, a well-known European computer association, from 1984 to 1997.

== Honours and awards ==
- 1995 Member of the Chinese Academy of Engineering (CAE)
