= Delores Ann Richburg Greene =

American educator

- Delores Richburg (later Greene), from the 1953 yearbook of Peabody High School
- Born: January 29, 1936; Petersburg, Virginia, U.S.
- Died: April 11, 2022 (age 86)
- Occupations: College administrator, educator

Delores Ann Richburg Greene (January 29, 1936 – April 11, 2022) was an American educator based in Virginia. She was a dean of two colleges of education, at Virginia Union University and at Virginia State University.

== Early life and education ==
Richburg was born in Petersburg, Virginia, the daughter of Robert Richburg and Mildred Mercille Wynn Richburg. She graduated from Peabody High School in 1953. She earned a bachelor's degree in music education and a master's degree in elementary education at Virginia State University, with a 1965 master's thesis on the SRA Reading Laboratory. She completed an Ed.D. at the University of Virginia in 1977, with a doctoral dissertation on curriculum plans.

== Career ==
Greene taught music in Virginia schools early in her career. She was assistant superintendent for elementary education in Richmond Public Schools. After she retired from schoolwork in 1993, she was Dean of Interdisciplinary Studies in the College of Education at Virginia Union University. In 2004, she became dean of Professional Education in the College of Education at her alma mater, Virginia State University. She retired a second time in 2014.

Greene was a member of Delta Sigma Theta and Pi Lambda Theta. She served on the boards of the Virginia Center for Educational Leadership and the Richmond Children's Museum, among other advisory positions, and co-founded the African American Critical Issues Network. She was named YWCA Woman of the Year in Education in 2000, and was honored by the United Negro College Fund, Kappa Delta Pi, and the Martha Mason Hill Memorial Foundation.

== Personal life ==
Delores Richburg married fellow educator Robert Taylor Greene in 1960. They had a son, Robert Jr., and a daughter, Michele. Her husband died in 1996, and Greene died in 2022, at the age of 86.
