= Henry S. Valk =

American physicist (1929–2022)

Henry Snowden Valk
- Born: January 26, 1929
- Died: April 12, 2022 (aged 93)
- Education: George Washington University (B.S., M.S.), Washington University in St. Louis (Ph.D.)
- Known for: Quantum Mechanics; academic leadership at Georgia Tech
- Notable work: Quantum Mechanics (1986), co-authored with M. Alonso
- Scientific career
- Fields: Physics, Mathematics
- Workplaces: Georgia Institute of Technology, University of Nebraska

Henry Snowden Valk (January 26, 1929 – April 12, 2022) was an American physicist and academic. He was Professor Emeritus of Physics at the Georgia Institute of Technology. Valk attended George Washington University where he received his B.S. in physics in 1953 and M.S. in mathematics in 1954. He then earned his Ph.D. at Washington University in St. Louis in 1957. Before joining the faculty at the Georgia Institute of Technology, Valk was a professor of physics at the University of Nebraska.

While at Georgia Tech, Valk became Dean of the College of Science and Liberal Studies, which has since split into the College of Sciences, the College of Computing, and the Ivan Allen College of Liberal Arts.

Valk died on April 12, 2022, at the age of 93.

== Books ==
H. Valk, and M. Alonso, "Quantum Mechanics" Krieger Publishing Company, Melbourne 1986
