= Zou Yan (general) =

Chinese soldier (1915–2022)

- 邹衍

Deputy Political Commissar of Shenyang Military Region
- In office August 1969 – December 1980
- Political Commissar: Pan Fusheng; Mao Yuanxin; Wang Huiqiu; Gan Weihan; Liao Hansheng

Personal details
- Born: 5 November 1915 Xingguo County, Jiangxi, China
- Died: 1 April 2022 (aged 106) Shenyang, Liaoning, China
- Party: Chinese Communist Party
- Education: Central Party School of the Chinese Communist Party

Military service
- Allegiance: People's Republic of China
- Branch/service: Red Army; Eighth Route Army; People's Liberation Army Ground Force
- Years of service: 1930–1988
- Rank: Major General
- Battles/wars: Chinese Civil War
- Awards: 1 August Medal (3rd Class); Order of Independence and Freedom (2nd Class); Order of Liberation (1st Class)

Chinese name
- Simplified Chinese: 邹衍
- Traditional Chinese: 鄒衍
Transcriptions
Standard Mandarin
- Hanyu Pinyin: Zōu Yǎn

Zou Yan
- Simplified Chinese: 邹衍桃
- Traditional Chinese: 鄒衍桃
Transcriptions
Standard Mandarin
- Hanyu Pinyin: Zōu Yǎntáo

Zou Yan (Chinese: 邹衍; 5 November 1915 – 1 April 2022) was a Chinese military general and politician. He was a founding major general (shaojiang) of the People's Liberation Army (PLA). He was a representative of the 9th, 11th, 12th, 13th National Congress of the Chinese Communist Party, and a member of the 12th Central Commission for Discipline Inspection.

== Biography ==
Zou was born into a family of farming background in Xingguo County, Jiangxi, in 1915.

He enlisted in the Red Army in 1930, and joined the Chinese Communist Party (CCP) in 1935. During the Long March, he was communication foreman of the General Political Department. After graduating from the Central Party School of the Chinese Communist Party, he worked in the Shaanxi-Gansu-Ningxia Border Region and was rated as a model worker in 1942 due to his outstanding achievements in mass production movement. During the Chinese Civil War, he successively served as a political commissar in the Shanxi-Chahar-Hebei Military Region, Mudanjiang Military District, Northeast Field Army, and Fourth Field Army.

After establishment of the Communist State in 1951, he was assigned to the Northeast Public Security Force as deputy political commissar, capturing the CIA spies Donnay and Fecteau. He attained the rank of major general (shaojiang) in 1955. In August 1969, he rose to become deputy political commissar of Shenyang Military Region, and served until December 1980. He retired in 1988.

On 2 April 2022, Yan died in Shenyang, Liaoning, at the age of 106.
