= David G. Mason =

American politician (1942–2022)

David Gray Mason (August 30, 1942 – April 3, 2022) was an American politician.

Mason was born in New Castle, Kentucky. He lived in Shelbyville, Kentucky, and went to the University of Kentucky College of Law. He was elected to the Kentucky House of Representatives in 1973, and served until November 1977, when he resigned to become county attorney for Henry County.
