= Pan Jiluan =

Chinese scientist (1927–2022)

- 潘际銮

President of Nanchang University
- In office 1993–2002
- Preceded by: New title
- Succeeded by: Zhou Wenbin

Personal details
- Born: 24 December 1927 Ruichang County, Jiangxi, China
- Died: 19 April 2022 (aged 94) Beijing, China
- Party: Chinese Communist Party
- Spouse: Li Shiyu
- Education: National Southwestern Associated University; Tsinghua University; Harbin Institute of Technology
- Scientific career
- Fields: Welding
- Workplaces: Nanchang University

Chinese name
- Simplified Chinese: 潘际銮
- Traditional Chinese: 潘際鑾
Transcriptions
Standard Mandarin
- Hanyu Pinyin: Pān Jìluán

Pan Jiluan (24 December 1927 – 19 April 2022) was a Chinese scientist who served as president of Nanchang University, and an academician of the Chinese Academy of Sciences. He was a representative of the 11th and 15th National Congress of the Chinese Communist Party.

== Biography ==
Pan was born in Ruichang County (now Ruichang), Jiangxi, on 24 December 1927. He primarily studied at Binxing School (滨兴小学) in Jiujiang County and secondary studied at Yunnan Provincial High School. In 1937, the Second Sino-Japanese War broke out, in order to avoid the massacre of the Imperial Japanese Army, their family fled from their home in Jiujiang County to Kunming, Yunnan. In August 1944, he was accepted by National Southwestern Associated University, majoring in the Mechanical Department.

In July 1946, the National Southwestern Associated University was abolished, and he transferred to the Department of Machinery of Tsinghua University to continue his study. After university in August 1948, he stayed and taught at the university. He joined the Chinese Communist Party (CCP) in October 1948. In August 1950, he began graduate work at Harbin Institute of Technology and earned his master's degree in 1953 under the advisement of Soviet scientist Prokhorov. After graduating, he taught at the institute.

In August 1955, he moved back to Tsinghua University, where he was promoted to full professor in 1978 and to director of the Department of Machinery in 1991. He was a visiting scholar at E.O. Paton Electric Welding Institute in 1959, a visiting professor at RWTH Aachen University and the Technical University of Hannover in 1978, and a visiting professor at the Ohio State University in 1986. In April 1993, he was promoted to become president of Nanchang University, and held that office until 2002.

On 19 April 2022, he died of an illness in Beijing, at the age of 94.

== Personal life ==
Pan met Li Shiyu (李世豫) in Beijing in 1950 and they married in 1955.

== Honours and awards ==
- 1980 Member of the Chinese Academy of Sciences (CAS)
- 2000 Science and Technology Progress Award of the Ho Leung Ho Lee Foundation
- 2008 State Science and Technology Progress Award (Second Class)

Educational offices
New title	President of Nanchang University; 1993–2002	Succeeded by Zhou Wenbin (周文斌)
