= Philip J. Hilts =

American journalist (1947–2022)

Philip James Hilts (10 May 1947 – April 23, 2022) was an American journalist and author. He worked for The New York Times and The Washington Post.

Hilts was born on May 10, 1947, in Chicago, Illinois. Edward, his father, was a writer. Katherine (Bonn) Hilts, his mother, worked at Sears.

He died on April 23, 2022, in Lebanon, New Hampshire, due to liver disease complications.

== Books ==
- Smokescreen: The Truth Behind the Tobacco Industry Cover-Up (Addison-Wesley, 1996)
- Rx for Survival: Why We Must Rise to the Global Health Challenge (2005)
- Protecting America’s Health: The FDA, Business, and One Hundred Years of Regulation (2003)
- Scientific Temperaments: Three Lives in Contemporary Science (1982)
