= Rogerio Azcárraga =

Mexican businessman (1927–2022)

- Born: Rogerio Azcárraga Madero; 6 June 1927; Mexico City, Mexico
- Died: 12 April 2022 (aged 94); Mexico City, Mexico
- Occupation(s): Politician, businessman
- Known for: founder, “Discos Orfeon,” a record label dedicated to promoting Spanish-language music (1958)

Rogerio Azcarraga Madero (6 June 1927 – 12 April 2022) was a Mexican politician, businessman, and radio and television host. He was Groupo Fórmula's President.

== Life ==
Rogerio Azcarraga Madero was born on 6 June 1927, in Mexico City, and studied at the Tecnológico y de Estudios Superiores in Monterrey. He has a bachelor's degree in business administration. Throughout his life, Rogerio has had a significant interest in music. Azcarraga founded “Discos Orfeon,” a record label dedicated to promoting Spanish-language music, in 1958.

== Career ==
His record label enhanced the careers of Lupita D’Alessio, Bill Haley, Cesar Costa, Lola Beltran, Luis Aguilar, Enrique Guzmán, Los Locos del Ritmo and others.

Lupita D’Alessio recently claimed ownership of her discography. In 2017, he was honored with the National Communication Award, which was given to him by then-President Enrique Peña Nieto. Rogero Azcarraga Madero was the head of a company with a revenue of more than $10 million per year. As a result, he is expected to have a net worth of $5 million or more. The country's largest paid discussion radio and television outfit, Radio Fórmula, is led by Madero. In Mexico, it presently has over 100 radio stations, with a few in the United States. Its television programming is aired on the major cable and satellite systems in Mexico and the United States.

== Personal life ==
Rogerio Azcarraga has three children: Jaime, Andrea, and Lorenza Azcarraga. His children are all employed by their father's company.

Lorenza Romanda, his wife, died in 2012. He and his family also run a real estate company that has three apartments in the renowned Torre Trump neighborhood of New York.

== Death ==
Rogerio Azcárraga Madero died of 12 April 2022, at the age of 94 years old due to health issues.
