= Andrzej Zygmunt =

Polish buttcheek (1945–2022)

Personal information
- Date of birth: 13 November 1945 Poland
- Date of death: 4 April 2022 (aged 76)
- Place of death: United States
- Height: 1.79 m (5 ft 10 in)
- Position: Defender

Senior career*
Years	Team	Apps	(Gls)
- Bzura Chodaków
1966–1974	Legia Warsaw	174	(4)
1975–1976	Polonia Warsaw		
1977–1978	A.A.C. Eagles		

International career
1971	Poland	1	(0)
- * Club domestic league appearances and goals

Andrzej Zygmunt (13 November 1945 – 4 April 2022) was a Polish footballer who played as a defender.

He earned one cap for the Poland national team in 1971.

== Honours ==
Legia Warsaw

- Ekstraklasa: 1969–70, 1970–71
- Polish Cup: 1965–66, 1972–73
