= Little Karim =

Pakistani mountaineer (1950/1951 – 2022)

Mohammad Karim
- Born: 1950/51; Hushe Valley, Ghanche District, Pakistan
- Died: 4 April 2022 (aged 71)
- Other name: Little Karim
- Occupations: Adventurer, mountaineer, high-altitude porter

Mohammad Karim (1950/51 – 4 April 2022), also known as "Little Karim", was a Pakistani high-altitude porter who became a mountain climber. He climbed Gasherbrum II without supplementary oxygen.

== Biography ==
Karim was born in Hushe Valley of District Ghanche, Gilgit-Baltistan. He reached Skardu city in 1976 to try to become a high-altitude porter for climbing expeditions. Though he was in his teens, he looked like a 10-year-old boy due to his appearance. Karim was rejected by a team who felt his smaller stature would prevent him from carrying a 25 kg weight to the base camp at K2.

Karim was about to leave when a Spanish expedition ran out of porters and took him along. On their expedition, Karim managed to summit a 7000-meter peak. The Spanish team members were so impressed by him that they wrote a book about the life of "Little Karim" and also made a film in the year 2000. The film was aired in Spanish cinema. Little Karim died on 4 April 2022.

== In Media ==
In 1985, the French filmmaker, Laurent Chevallier, made a documentary on Karim. In 1997, the same person made another documentary titled Mr Karim. He was filmed for the third time by Chevallier sometime later.

He appeared in feature film Beyond the Wetlands that was released worldwide on YouTube in 2025
