= Vundela Malakonda Reddy =

Indian poet (1932–2022)

Vundela Malakonda Reddy (23 August 1932 – 20 April 2022) was an engineer who is better known as a Telugu poet and great writer. He is also the founder of Chaitanya Bharathi Institute of Technology, Gandipet, Hyderabad. Reddy was born on 23 August 1932 in Inimerla, Prakasam district of Andhra Pradesh. He died on 20 April 2022 in Hyderabad, Telangana.

== Career ==
Education:

Allur, Nellore, Madras (Chennai), Edinburgh, Great Britain

Qualifications:

B.E. (Civil Engineering), M.Sc.(Structural Engineering), Ph.D. (Structural Engineering)

Service:

- Civil Engineer, P.W.D., Andhra Pradesh (1955–57)
- Lecturer, Osmania Engg. College, Hyd. (1957–61)
- Professor, Head of Civil Engg., Regional Engg. College (NIT), Warangal (1961–1979)
- Founder Principal & Secretary, Chaitanya Bharathi Institute of Technology, Gandipet, Hyderabad (1979–1990)
- Chairman, Chaitanya Bharathi Educational Society (2000–2003)
- Executive Secretary, Mediciti Institute of Medical Sciences, Ghanpur, Medchal Mandal R.R. Dt., A.P. (since 2002)
- Member, Executive Council, J.N.T. University, Hyderabad (since 1996)

== Poetry (Telugu) ==
- Netaji (1946)
- Vivekanandudu (1953)
- Kanthi Chakralu (1959)
- Mogali Rekulu (1981)
- Odesela Rallu (1986)
- Vilapinche Uttaram (1992)
- Satyam Sivam Sundaram (1996)

== Poetry (English) ==
- Gloating Grass (1988) presented at 10th World Congress of Poets at Bangkok
- Special Number (1992) International Poets Academy, Madras

== Awards ==
- Balasaraswathi - 1951
- Kavikireeti - 1986
- Mikhale Madhusudan Award - 1990
- Dasaradhi Award - 1990
- Creative Writing Award of Telugu University - 1991
- R.C.C. Design Competition Award by Indian Concrete Journal, Bombay - 1954
- Best Technical Paper Award of Institution of Engineers, A.P. -1972
- Entrepreneurship in Technical Education by ATA USA Award -1998
- American Biographical Institute Directory of distinguished Leadership Member-1998
- Fellow of A.P. Science Academy - 2003
- Indira Gandhi National Award - 2003
- Excellence in Science and Technology Award by ATA USA - 2004
