= Yu Guocong =

Chinese scientist (1922–2022)

- 余国琮
- Born: 18 November 1922; Taishan County, Guangdong, China
- Died: 6 April 2022 (aged 99); Tianjin, China
- Education: National Southwestern Associated University; University of Michigan; University of Pittsburgh
- Scientific career
- Fields: Chemical separation science and engineering
- Workplaces: Tianjin University

Chinese name
- Simplified Chinese: 余国琮
- Traditional Chinese: 余國琮
Transcriptions
Standard Mandarin
- Hanyu Pinyin: Yú Guócóng

Yu Guocong (18 November 1922 – 6 April 2022) was a Chinese scientist who was a professor at Tianjin University, and an academician of the Chinese Academy of Sciences. He was a member of the China Association for Promoting Democracy. He was a member of the 6th National Committee of the Chinese People's Political Consultative Conference and a member of the Standing Committee of the 7th and 8th Chinese People's Political Consultative Conference.

== Biography ==
Yu was born in Taishan County, Guangdong, on 18 November 1922. In 1937, the Imperial Japanese Army invaded Guangdong, his two old brothers were bombed during the war, one died and the other was seriously injured. His family fled to British Hong Kong due to the aggression of Empire of Japan. In 1939, he entered National Southwestern Associated University, majoring in the Department of Chemical Engineering. After graduating in 1943, he became an assistant engineer at the Central Industrial Experiment Institute of the Ministry of Economy. In 1944, Yu pursued advanced studies in the United States, first earning Master of Science degree from the University of Michigan in 1945 and then Ph.D. from the University of Pittsburgh in 1947. After graduation, he stayed and taught at the University of Pittsburgh.

In August 1950, Yu returned to China in the name of visiting relatives in British Hong Kong. At the invitation of Mao Yisheng, then president of North Jiaotong University, Yu became a professor and head of the newly founded Department of Chemical Engineering, Tangshan Institute of Technology (now Southwest Jiaotong University). In the summer of 1952, the Department of Chemical Engineering was incorporated into Tianjin University, and Yu was transferred to Tianjin University as a professor of the Department of Chemical Engineering. In 1983, the Institute of Chemical Engineering was established, and Yu served as the founding director. In 1985, he founded the Chemical Separation Technology and New Filler Development Center and set up a filler factory, thus forming a pattern of research, development and production. In 1991, the State Planning Commission invested in the establishment of the Distillation Laboratory of the Joint State Key Laboratory of Chemical Engineering in Tianjin University, with Yu as the director.

On 6 April 2022, he died of an illness in Tianjin, at the age of 99.

== Honours and awards ==
- 1991 Member of the Chinese Academy of Sciences (CAS)
- 1998 Science and Technology Progress Award of the Ho Leung Ho Lee Foundation
