= Windsor Major =

Rugby player (1927–2022)

- Full name: Windsor Cynwyd Major
- Born: 15 June 1927 Llangynwyd, Maesteg, Wales
- Died: 5 April 2022 (aged 94)

Rugby union career
- Position: Wing
International career
Years	Team	Apps	(Points)
1949–50	Wales	2	(0)

Windsor Cynwyd Major (15 June 1927 – 5 April 2022) was a Welsh international rugby union player.

Born in the ancient village of Llangynwyd, two miles south of the town of Maesteg in Glamorgan, Major attended Maesteg Comprehensive School and was still a teenager when he debuted for Maesteg RFC, playing initially in the same side as his father.

Major was a strong wing three-quarter and gained two Wales caps. He made his debut in Wales' final fixture of the 1949 Five Nations, a loss to France in Paris. His other appearance came in a 12–0 win over Scotland during their 1950 Five Nations campaign, which culminated in them claiming the grand slam for the fourth time. He was a member of the invincible Maesteg team that went unbeaten throughout the 1949–50 season.

== See also ==
- List of Wales national rugby union players
