= Salvatore Pica =

Italian art and design entrepreneur (1939–2022)

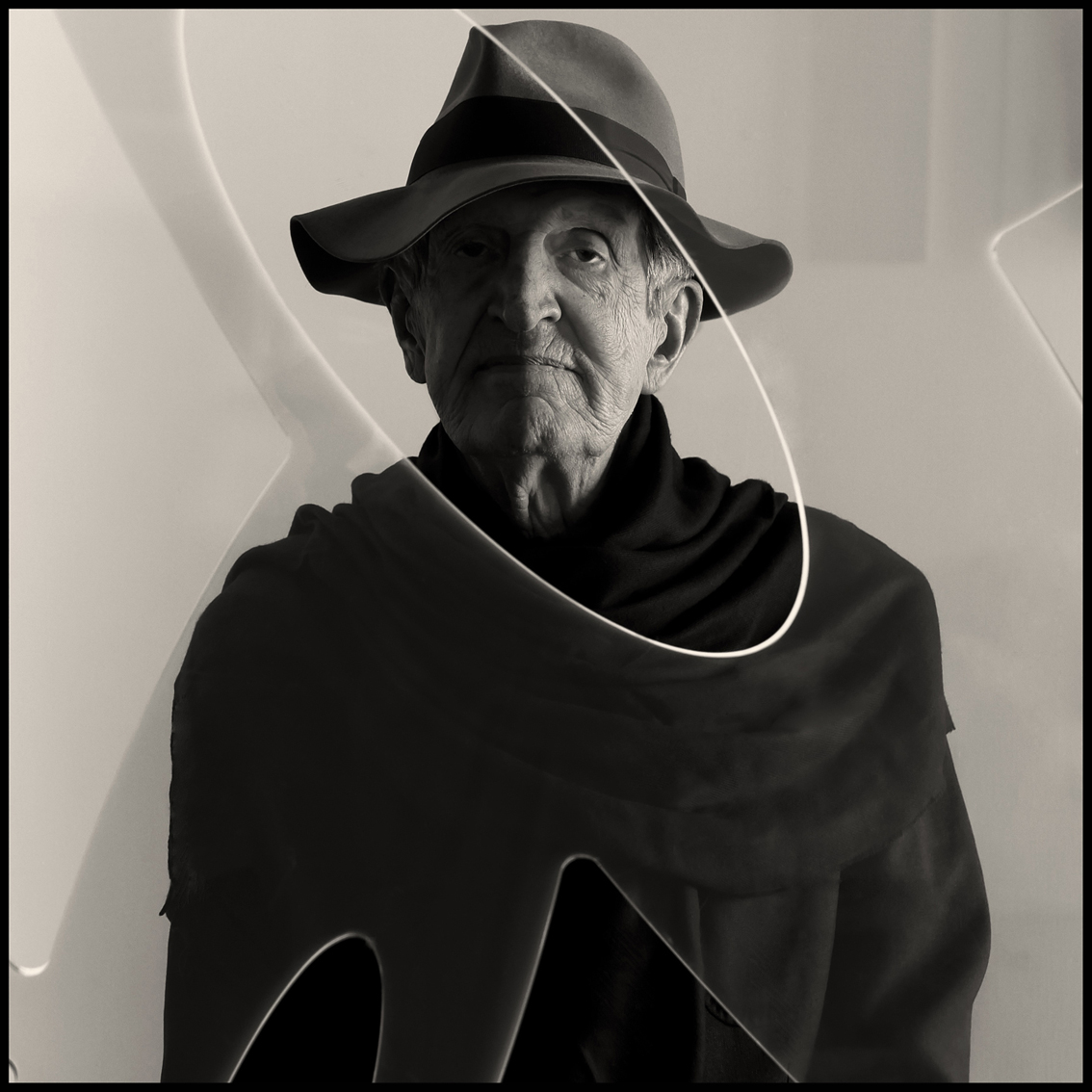
- Salvatore Pica in 2019, photographed by Augusto De Luca
- Born: 7 January 1939; Naples, Italy
- Died: 25 April 2022 (aged 83); Naples, Italy
- Occupations: Entrepreneur, cultural operator, writer
- Writing career
- Pen name: Pick&Paik

Salvatore Pica (7 January 1939 – 25 April 2022) was an Italian art and design entrepreneur. He was one of the first to promote design and contemporary art culture in post-war southern Italy.

== Ellisse center for design ==
In 1968, the Centro Ellisse opened in Naples, a city with many antiquarian furniture shops and restorers. Pica proposed selling modern Italian-designed products from manufacturers like Driade, Alessi and Kartell, and displaying them in a house-like setting. Following this innovative showroom style, the shop changed to sell artworks by contemporary Neapolitan artists and ones from his friend Lucio Amelio's Modern Art Agency.

== Work as cultural operator ==
'Centro Ellisse' was a sponsoring partner of Naples' Academy of Fine Art, producing competitions and exhibitions for art students. Ellisse published books on design, art, theatre, and anthropology under the editorial project "Quaderni Ellisse". Its authors included Giulio Baffi, Stefano De Stefano, and photographers including Fabio Donato.

At the Pica Gallery, Pica worked as curator and gallerist, supporting young artists amongst whom were Lino Fiorito, Gennaro Castellano, Adriana De Manes, Matteo Attruia, and Pierre-Yves Le Duc. He also helped re-discover artists he had promoted in the past including Renato Barisani and Sergio Fermariello.

Together with Lucio Rufolo, Pica was the formal founder of "Accademia della catastrofe", a situationist movement which involved Neapolitan writers.

Pica wrote about anthropology in an autobiographical and ethnographical style. He wrote about metropolitan anthropology, women, and Neapolitans in books published by houses including Dante & Descartes and Colonnese.

Pica died in Naples on 25 April 2022, after contracting COVID-19.

== Bibliography ==
- La notte è dura ma non ci fa paura (1990, Colonnese)
- La donna napoletana (1991, Colonnese)
- Il Maschio Napoletano (1996, Dante & Descartes)
- Tipi da baretto (1997, Dante & Descartes)
- Vissi d'Arte: Quarant’anni sui marciapiedi dell’arte 1968–2008 (2008, Profeta/Imprint)
- La Rabbia Esaudita (2012, Enzo Albano)
- I napoletani (2014, Enzo Albano)
