= Rex Harris =

British academic in materials science (1939–2022)

(Ivor) Rex Harris (27 July 1939 – 2 April 2022) FREng FIMMM FInstP was a British academic.

== Biography ==
=== Early years and education ===
Rex Harris was educated at Larkfield Grammar School in Chepstow. He graduated from the University of Birmingham with the degrees of BSc, PhD, and DSc.

=== Career ===
Harris was an ICI research fellow, then lecturer, and then senior lecturer at Birmingham University between 1964 and 1987. Harris was a Professor of Materials Science at Birmingham University from 1988. He was head of the school of metallurgy and materials at Birmingham University from 1996 to 2001, in addition to being acting head from 1989 to 1990.

Harris was President of the Magnetics Panel of the Institute of Physics in 1999, and President of the Birmingham Metallurgical Association in 1992. Harris was chairman of the UK Magnetics Club from 1988 to 1990. He was chairman of the European Material Research Society in 1988. Harris was chairman of the Magnetism and Magnetic Materials Initiative of SERC from 1992 to 1994. Harris was chair of the 13th International Workshop on Rare Earth Magnets and their Application in 1994, and of the 8th International Symposium on Magnetic Anisotropy and Coercivity in Rare-earth Metal Alloys in 1994.

=== Recognition ===
Harris was appointed a foreign member of the National Academy of Sciences of Ukraine in 2000. He was appointed to a Marie Curie individual fellowship in 2000. He became a Fellow of the Royal Academy of Engineering in 1994. He was appointed a Fellow of the Institute of Physics in 2003. He was made a Fellow of the Institute of Materials, Minerals and Mining in 1992. He was appointed a Member of the Institute of Electrical and Electronics Engineers in 1992.
