= Edward J. Bronson =

American political scientist (1930–2022)

Edward Jerome Bronson (May 10, 1930 – April 25, 2022) was an American political scientist. He was a professor of political science at California State University, Chico from 1969 to 2003. He was a leading researcher into the impartiality of juries. His analysis of the pretrial publicity of Timothy McVeigh and Terry Nichols was used in the decision to move their trials from Oklahoma to Colorado.
