= M. P. Govindan Nair =

Indian politician (1928–2022)

M.P. Govindan Nair
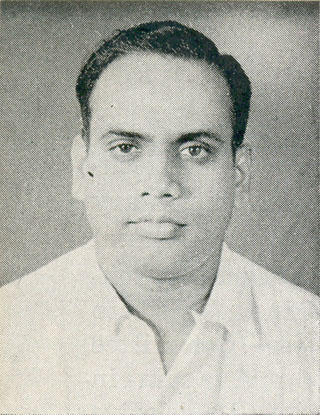
- Nair in 1960

Minister of Health of Kerala
- In office 9 October 1962 – 10 September 1964
- Preceded by: V. K. Velappan
- Succeeded by: B. Wellington

Member of the Kerala Legislative Assembly
- In office 9 February 1960 – 10 September 1964
- Preceded by: Kottayam Bhasi
- Succeeded by: M. K. George
- Constituency: Kottayam

Personal details
- Born: April 1928
- Died: 13 April 2022 (aged 94)
- Party: INC

M.P. Govindan Nair (April 1928 – 12 April 2022) was an Indian politician. A member of the Indian National Congress, he served in the Kerala Legislative Assembly from 1960 to 1964. He died on 12 April 2022, at the age of 94.
