= Frank Otway =

American basketball player (1923–2022)

Personal information
- Born: March 1, 1923 British West Indies
- Died: April 21, 2022 (aged 99) Orange City, Florida, U.S.
- Listed height: 6 ft 4 in (1.93 m)
- Listed weight: 205 lb (93 kg)

Career information
- College: Rider (1949–1951)
- NBA draft: 1951: undrafted
- Position: Forward

Career history
- 1944: Chicago American Gears
- 1946–1947: Bergen-Newark

Frank Hamilton Otway (March 1, 1923 – April 21, 2022) was an American professional basketball player. He played for the Chicago American Gears in the National Basketball League for one game during the 1944–45 season.

Otway was in the Marine Corps and got stationed in Chicago, Illinois. At the time, he was attending the University of Chicago and saw an ad in the newspaper for open tryout for the Chicago American Gears; he tried and out and made the team. He was only able to play in one game before his commanding officer discovered it and forced Otway to quit. When World War II ended, Otway continued his education at Rider University in New Jersey, where he also played on the basketball team.

Otway died in Orange City, Florida on April 21, 2022, at the age of 99.
