= Rada Granovskaya =

Russian psychologist (1929–2022)

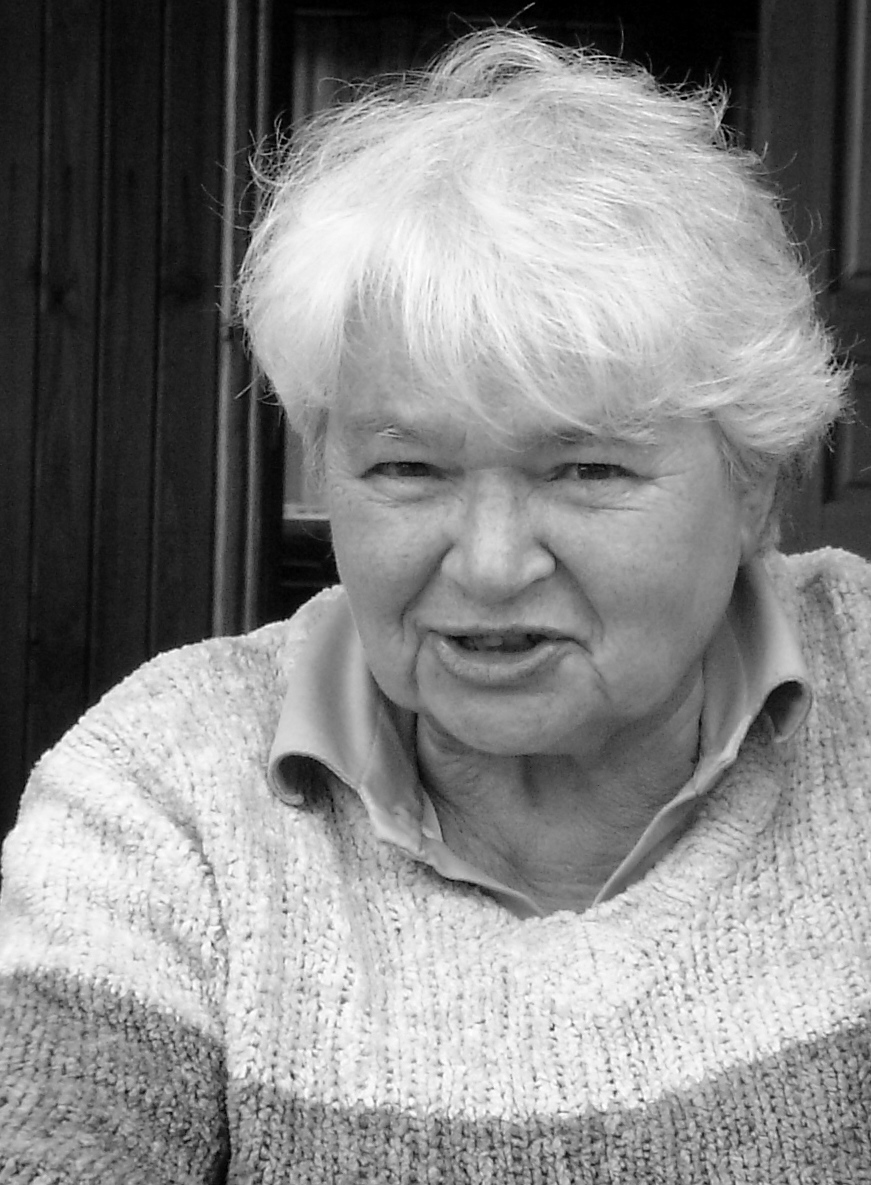

Rada Mikhailovna Granovskaya (Russian: Рада Михайловна Грановская; 13 August 1929 – 17 April 2022) was a well-known psychologist, professor of the Saint Petersburg State University; academician of the Baltic Academy of Pedagogical Sciences and the International Academy of Acmeology. Her basic works are on practical psychology and psychological protection. She is an author of conceptual model of interaction of thinking of the person with system of the subconscious and realized psychological barriers, and also mechanisms and ways of their overcoming.

== Bibliography ==
- Elements of practical psychology. — L.: Publishing house LGU, 1984. — SPb.: Svet, 1997. — L.: Publishing house LGU, 1988. — SPb.: Svetas, 2000. — SPb.: Rech, 2003. — SPb.: Rech, 2007
- Psychology of faith. — SPb.: Rech, 2004
- Psychology in examples. — SPb.: Rech, 2002. — SPb.: Rech, 2007
- Creativity and the conflict in a mirror of psychology. — SPb.: Rech, 2006
- Psychological protection. — SPb.: Rech, 2007
