= J.W. Stoker =

American trick rider, roper (1927–2022)

- Born: September 30, 1927; Colorado Springs, Colorado, U.S.
- Died: April 21, 2022 (aged 94); Weatherford, Texas, U.S.
- Occupations: Trick rider, trick roper

J.W. Stoker (September 30, 1927 – April 21, 2022) was an American trick rider and trick roper.

== Life and career ==
Stoker was born in Colorado Springs, Colorado.

Stoker began his career in 1939. He was a stunt rider for Roy Rogers. He also performed as a double for actor Sam Bottoms in the film Bronco Billy.

Stoker died on April 21, 2022, in Weatherford, Texas, at the age of 94.

== Honors ==
- 1999 Rodeo Hall of Fame of the National Cowboy & Western Heritage Museum
- 2007 Texas Cowboy Hall of Fame
- 2011 ProRodeo Hall of Fame
- 2015 Texas Rodeo Cowboy Hall of Fame
