= Meena Parande =

Indian table tennis player (1930–2022)

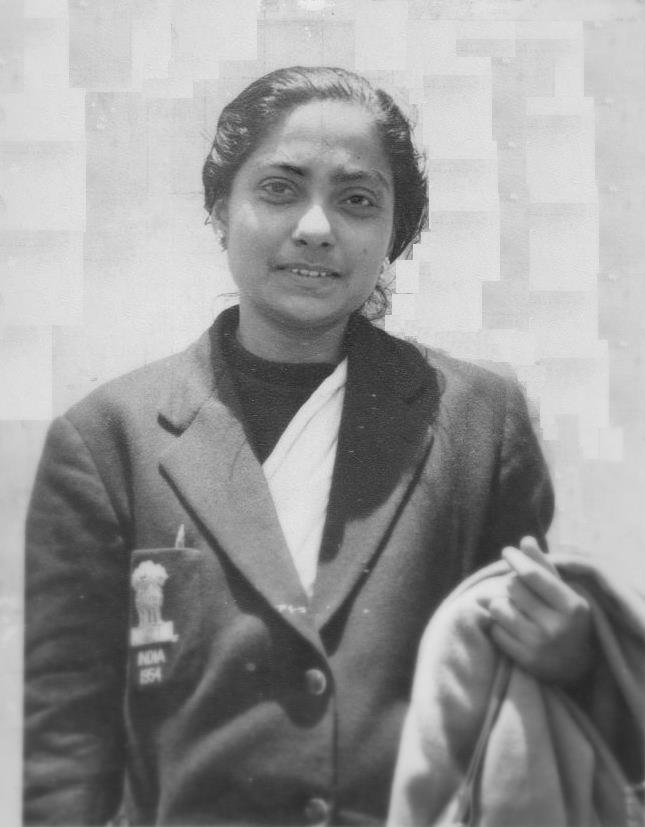
- Meena Parande in the 1950s

Personal information
- Full name: Meena Parande
- Nationality: India
- Born: 12 December 1930
- Died: 1 January 2022 (aged 91)

Sport
- Sport: Table tennis
Medal record
Women's table tennis
Representing India
Asian Championships
Silver medal – second place	1954 Singapore	Mixed Doubles

Meena Parande (12 December 1930 – 1 April 2022) was an Indian table tennis player who represented her country internationally and was ranked number 3 in Asia in the 1950s.

Meena Parande was born on 12 December 1930. Her father was a barrister and sports enthusiast D. K. Parande. Meena Parande was encouraged to learn to play table tennis by her grandmother, and began her competitive career in 1951. She played for Maharashtra State from 1953 to 1958 and then for the Indian Railways from 1959 to 1965.

== National and international career ==
Parande won her first national championship in 1954 at Baroda, beating the more experienced Syeeda Sultana. She then won it again in 1956 at Saharanpur, in 1957 at Ahmedabad, and finally the Triple Crown of Table Tennis in 1959 at Calcutta.

Parande represented India on a tour of England in 1954 and Japan in 1956. These tours made her the first Maharashtrian woman to have represented India in world championship table tennis.

She also represented India in the Asian championships at Singapore in 1954, Bangkok in 1955, Vietnam in 1961, and Bombay (now Mumbai) in 1963. She was ranked number 3 in Asia in 1954. She toured Sri Lanka and Pakistan three times and won the local tournaments there. She received training from Mr. Chandorkar of Nagpur.

== Coaching career ==
While playing table tennis she coached many boys and girls in Pune, including: Dr. Charudatta Apte, Ajay Shidhaye, Ajay Tulpule, Prakash Tulpule, Rajiv Bodas, S.K. Bayas, Makaranda Godbole, Shrikant Kale, Suhas Kulkerni, Nandini Kulkerni, Neela Kulkerni, Sunanda Kane, and Ranjana Vaidya.

After retiring from the Indian Railways team, Parande trained many players for table tennis from 1965 to 1985. Her students included Dr. Charudatta Apte, Rajeev Bodas, Suhas Kulkarni, and Ajeya Sidhaye.

== Other interests ==
Following her retirement from table tennis, Parande took great interest in studying "Yoga". She visited many "Yoga-Ashrams" in India, such as Munger in Bihar, Yogniketan in Hrishikesh, Arvind ashram in Pondicherry, Vivekananda Kendra in Kanyakumari, and Raman Mahershi's Ashram. She attended Vipashana shibirs (camp) in Igatpuri for six months.

Parande resided in the Ashirvad apartments in Pune until her death in 2022.
