= José Vilariño =

Argentine engineer and politician (1961–2022)

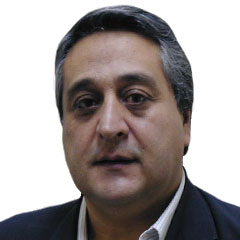
- Vilariño in 2011

Member of the Argentine Chamber of Deputies
- In office 10 December 2007 – 9 December 2015
- Constituency: Salta Province
- In office 24 November 2003 – 23 November 2007
- Constituency: Capital Department
- In office 24 November 1995 – 23 November 1999
- Constituency: Capital Department

Personal details
- Born: José Antonio Vilariño; 19 May 1961 San Ramón de la Nueva Orán, Argentina
- Died: 8 April 2022 (aged 60) Buenos Aires, Argentina
- Party: Victory Party
- Education: National University of Salta
- Occupation: Engineer

José Antonio Vilariño (19 May 1961 – 8 April 2022) was an Argentine engineer and politician. A member of the Victory Party, he served in the Argentine Chamber of Deputies from 1995 to 1999 and again from 2003 to 2015. He died of cardiac arrest in Buenos Aires on 8 April 2022 at the age of 60.
