= William Burgess (sailor) =

Canadian sailor (1930–2022)

William George Burgess (26 October 1930 – 14 April 2022) was a Canadian yacht racer who competed in the 1960 Summer Olympics. He was born in Vancouver, British Columbia. Burgess died in Vancouver on 14 April 2022, at the age of 91.
