= Olga Fiorini =

Italian businesswoman and educator (1927–2022)

Esterina Olga Fiorini
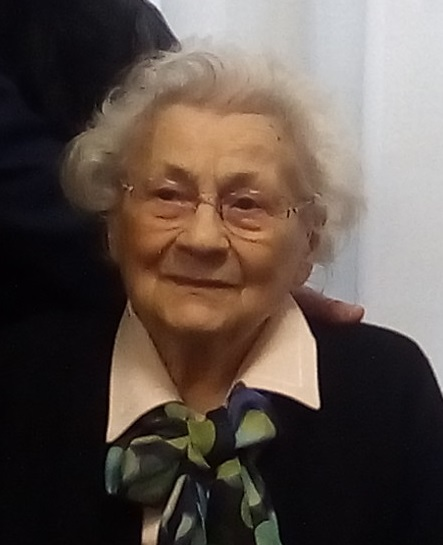
- Born: Esterina Olga Fiorini; 13 January 1927; Sorgà, Italy
- Died: 12 April 2022 (aged 95); Busto Arsizio, Italy
- Occupations: Businesswoman, educator

Esterina Olga Fiorini (13 January 1927 – 12 April 2022) was an Italian businesswoman and educator who founded the eponymous professional school in Busto Arsizio, Varese.

== Biography ==
He graduated from the University of Bologna and, after working in Switzerland and Germany where he honed his creative and technical skills, he started a tailoring business in Busto Arsizio, in the province of Varese, a city with a rich tradition in the Textile industry. Alongside her business activities, she also taught the art of tailoring to young women in Busto Arsizio.

Her professional courses were officially recognized in 1956, when they were still reserved for girls only, but soon became a fully-fledged school for fashion and clothing professionals under the name of the “Olga Fiorini” Professional Institute for Industry, Crafts, and Services. The building housing the Olga Fiorini and Marco Pantani high schools was inaugurated in 1988 by fashion designer Ottavio Missoni.

Today, it is one of the few companies operating in the fashion sector in the Varese area and, after expanding into other areas of upper secondary education, it issues European-recognized certificates. In 1999, both Olympic swimming champion Nicolò Martinenghi and Matteo Gabbia, Italian soccer champion with AC Milan, graduated from his sports-oriented scientific high school dedicated to the memory of Marco Pantani.

In 2000, she received the Rosa Camuna award, given by the Lombardy women who have made a commitment to education, work, culture, civil and social engagement, and creativity[2]. In 2009, on the recommendation of the Prime Minister, she was awarded the title of Order of Merit of the Italian Republic.

In 2015, on the occasion of the 150th anniversary of the municipality's elevation to city status, the City of Busto Arsizio established the “Olga Fiorini” Award, presented annually to individuals who, in the course of their professional, voluntary, and collaborative activities, have shown significant commitment and attention to the training, instruction, and education of younger generations.

Olga Fiorini died at the age of 95. The school system she founded (which has 20 facilities throughout Lombardy, over 3,500 students, and approximately 800 employees) is now run by her grandson Mauro Ghisellini, Commander of the Order of Merit of the Italian Republic, assisted by his sister Cinzia Ghisellini.

In October 2022, ACOF leaders published the official book Volere è potere (Where There's a Will, There's a Way), written by Marco Linari and published by Macchione Editore, which traces all the stages of Olga Fiorini's life and the school complex named after her.

In 2022, Blitos Edizioni published a book written by Olga Fiorini herself and Elena Cartotto, entitled Olga Fiorini, la sarta di Dio. Conversazioni a margine della vita (Olga Fiorini, God's seamstress. Conversations on the margins of life). On July 13, 2023, the book was presented on RAI during the PlayBooks program, in the episode entitled “Periferie e margini” (Suburbs and margins).

== Honors ==
Rosa Camuna – 2000
Ufficiale Ordine al Merito della Repubblica Italiana – 2 June 2009
