= Hana Truncová =

Czech political prisoner (1924–2022)

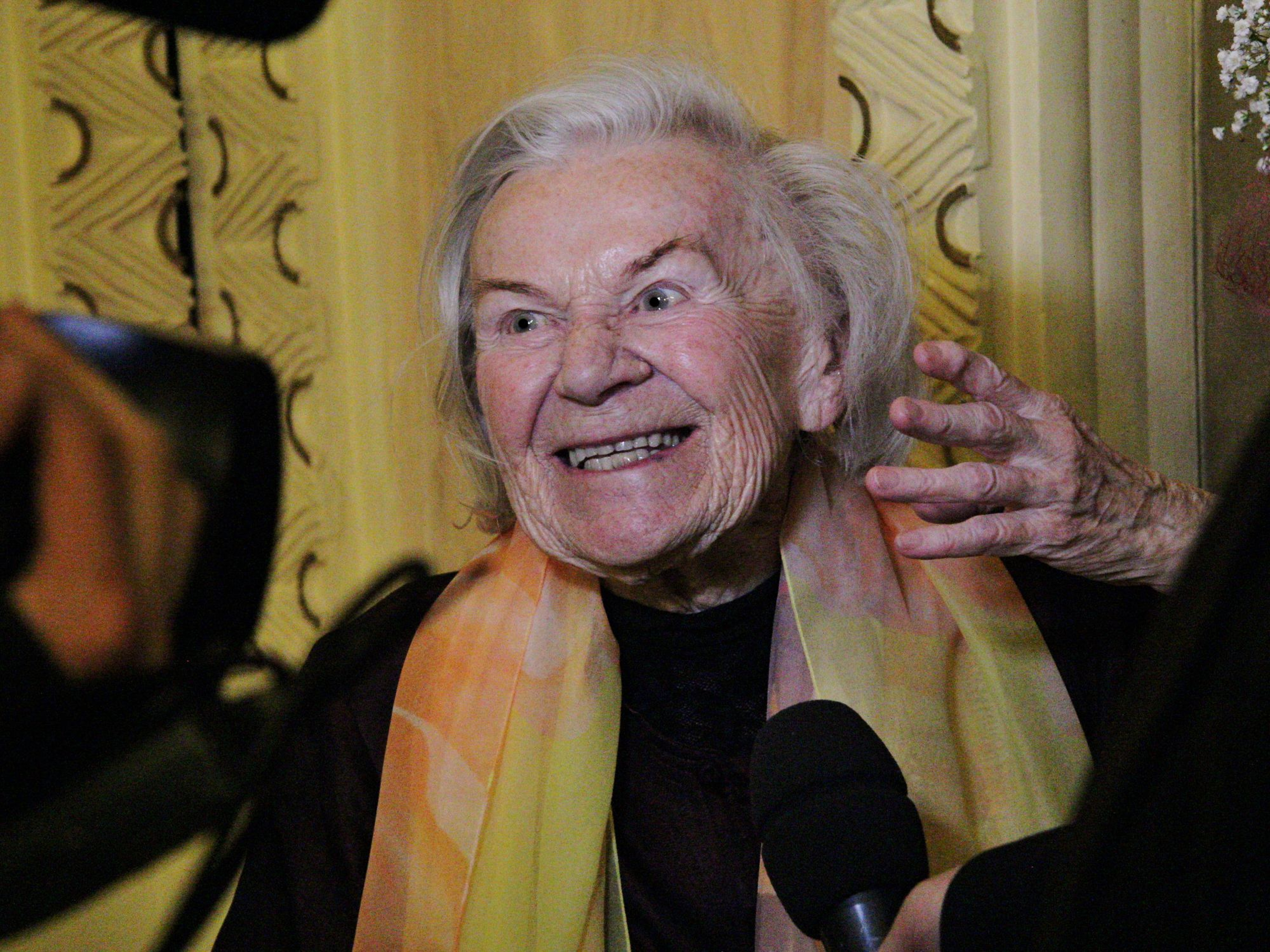
Hana Truncová.jpg

Hana Truncová (23 August 1924, Teplice – 7 April 2022, Skuteč) was a political prisoner of Czech-German descent.

== Biography ==
Born in Czechoslovakia, she was the oldest member of the editorial board of the Krušnohorské noviny (Erzgebirgs-Zeitung) and a witness to their historical editorial office, which worked in Teplice-Šanov until 1943 under the guidance of professor Dr. Gustav Müller.
