= Helen Oppenheimer =

British theologian and academic (1926–2022)

Helen Oppenheimer (née Lucas-Tooth; 30 December 1926 – 6 April 2022) was a British theologian and academic.

== Life and career ==
Helen Lucas-Tooth was born in Belgravia, London on 30 December 1926, to Laetitia, who served with the Women's Voluntary Services during World War II, and Hugh Lucas-Tooth, a Conservative MP and War Office employee.

She was educated at Cheltenham Ladies' College before earning a scholarship to Lady Margaret Hall Oxford University, where she studied philosophy, politics, and economics, graduating with first-class honors. At Oxford, she met Sir Michael Oppenheimer, a baronet from a South African mining family, whom she married in 1947. They had three daughters.

After a brief period in South Africa, the family returned to Oxford in the early 1950s during the rise of apartheid. From 1964 to 1969, Helen was a lecturer at Oxford and Cuddesdon Theological College. The family lived in North Oxford for a time, where the Oppenheimers hosted dinner gatherings that facilitated academic discussion. In 1969, they relocated to Jersey, where both focused on writing and culinary activities.

In 1979, Helen gave the University Sermon at Oxford and in 1993 she received an honorary Lambeth Doctor of Divinity.

In her later years, Helen reflected on aging and continued her academic work. Following Michael's death in 2020, she maintained involvement with her family, local church, and literary projects. Her book Profitable Wonders examines themes related to faith, the human condition, and mortality.

Oppenheimer died at her home in Grouville, Jersey, on 6 April 2022, aged 95.
