= Doris Honig Merritt =

American physician (1923–2022)

- Born: Doris Honig; July 16, 1923; Manhattan, NY
- Died: April 12, 2022 (aged 98); Indiana
- Education: Hunter College; George Washington University School of Medicine
- Occupation: Pediatrician Professor Assistant Dean Acting Dean
- Spouse: A. Donald Merritt
- Children: 2

Doris M. Honig Merritt (July 16, 1923 – April 12, 2022) was an American physician and the first woman to serve on a board for the National Library of Medicine. Her contributions included serving as the first women on both the National Library of Medicine and the Assistant Dean of Medical research at Indiana University School of Medicine. Her inspiration to become a doctor came after serving in the Navy during World War II when she had to begin searching for a long-term profession.

== Education ==
Doris Merritt attended Hunter College of the University of the City of New York in 1944, where she studied English literature, graduating Cum Laude and as part of the Phi Beta Kappa honor society. She went on to medical school at The George Washington University School of Medicine in 1952, after completing pre-medical course from 1946 to 1948 in order to be eligible to apply.

== Medical and administrative career ==
After graduating from Medical school in 1952, she went on to complete a residency in Pediatrics at Duke University. She later became assistant resident in pediatrics at Duke University from 1954 to 1955. She finished up with her fellowship in pediatrics at Duke University from 1955 to 1956. In 1961 Dr. Merritt became a professor of pediatrics at Indiana University School of Medicine. After moving with her husband, she was named the director of Medical research grants and contracts at Indiana University School of medicine in 1961. Following that, in 1962 she became the first woman to be named Assistant Dean of Research at Indiana University School of Medicine and served in that position from 1962 to 1978 where she discovered her passion for administrative work in Fesler Hall, where her office was located. In her time at the university, she helped raise an estimated $105 million for construction and research. After relocating back to Maryland with her husband in 1978, she was appointed the Special Assistant to the director of the National Institutes of Health for research training and research resources. In the same year, she became the first woman to chair the National Library of Medicine Board of Regents. In 1986, she was appointed the first acting director of the National Center for Nursing Research of the National Institutes of Health. Her husband died during this period of time shortly after her appointment. Merritt was appointed the Associate Dean of the Indiana University School of Medicine in 1988. In 1995, she unexpectedly was appointed the dean of Purdue School of Engineering and technology at IUPUI, making her the first woman to occupy this position. She took on her final position at the University as Acting Associate Vice president for research and graduate studies after retiring from her last position.

== Later life and death ==
In 1998, Merritt retired from the university as the Acting Associate Vice president for research and graduate studies. Her legacy continues due to her many contributions, with three awards at Indiana University Purdue University Indianapolis in her name; including the Doris H. Merritt, MD, Lectureship in Women's Health presented by Indiana University School of Medicine.

In 2019 Merritt recorded an oral history interview currently held in the IUPUI eArchives.

Merritt died on April 12, 2022, at the age of 98.
