= Alexander Shkurko =

Russian historian and politician (1937–2022)

Alexander Shkurko L.d'H.O

President of the State Historical Museum
- In office 1992–2010
- Preceded by: Konstantin Levykin
- Succeeded by: Aleksey Levykin

First Deputy Minister of Culture of the Russian SFSR
- In office 1981–1992

Personal details
- Born: Alexander Ivanovich Shkurko; 4 November 1937 Kharkov, Ukrainian SSR, Soviet Union
- Died: 10 April 2022 (aged 84) Moscow, Russia
- Party: CPSU
- Education: Moscow State University
- Occupation: Historian

Alexander Ivanovich Shkurko (Russian: Алекса́ндр Ива́нович Шкурко́; 4 November 1937 – 10 April 2022) was a Russian historian and politician. He served as president of the State Historical Museum from 1992 to 2010. He died in Moscow on 10 April 2022, at 84.
