= Friedrich-Wilhelm Kiel =

German politician (1934–2022)

Member of the Landtag of Baden-Württemberg
- In office 1992–2001

Mayor of Ettlingen
- In office 1966–1970

Mayor of Pforzheim
- In office 1970–1976

Lord mayor of Fellbach
- In office 1976–2000

Personal details
- Born: 17 May 1934 Berlin-Charlottenburg, Branderburg, Prussia, Germany
- Died: 4 April 2022 (aged 87)
- Party: FDP
- Education: Karlsruhe Institute of Technology
- Profession: Teacher

Friedrich-Wilhelm Kiel (17 May 1934 – 4 April 2022) was a German politician and member of the FDP.

Kiel studied physics, mathematics, and sport at the Karlsruhe Institute of Technology and became a member of the FDP in 1964 whilst teaching at a gymnasium in Ettlingen, where he later became mayor (1966–1970). In 1970, Kiel became mayor of Pforzheim, until 1976, when he was elected to become mayor of Fellbach, a position he held until 2000.

From 1992 until 2001, Kiel was also a member of the Landtag of Baden-Württemberg. For his services to the state, minister-president Erwin Teufel awarded him the Order of Merit of Baden-Württemberg on 5 May 2001. Kiel was made an honorary citizen of Fellbach and the Hungarian city Pécs, whilst the University of Pécs appointed him an honorary senator of their educational establishment.
