= Eleanor Whittemore =

American politician (1926–2022)

Eleanor H. Whittemore (December 27, 1926 – April 1, 2022) was an American politician.

Whittemore was born in Hollis, New Hampshire, and worked with the Brookdale Fruit Farm. She received her associate degree in accounting from Daniel Webster College. Whittemore served one term in the New Hampshire House of Representatives from 1983 until 1985 and was a Republican.
