= René Mornex =

French doctor and academic (1927–2022)

- Born: 12 August 1927; Lyon, France
- Died: 11 April 2022 (aged 94); Lyon, France
- Education: Collège-lycée Ampère; University of Lyon
- Occupations: Doctor; Professor

René Mornex (12 August 1927 – 11 April 2022) was a French doctor and academic. He is honorary dean of the Faculty of Medicine of University of Lyon and pioneer of endocrinology, more particularly of neuroendocrinology.
