= Piero Scesa =

Italian footballer (1939–2022)

Personal information
- Date of birth: 28 February 1939
- Place of birth: Domodossola, Italy
- Date of death: 18 April 2022 (aged 83)
- Place of death: Villadossola, Italy

Senior career*
Years	Team	Apps	(Gls)
1957–1959	Novara		
1959–1964	Torino		
1964–1970	Mantova		
- * Club domestic league appearances and goals

Piero Scesa (28 February 1939 – 18 April 2022) was an Italian professional footballer who played as a full back for Novara, Torino and Mantova.
