= DJ Delete =

Australian disc jockey (1987–2022)

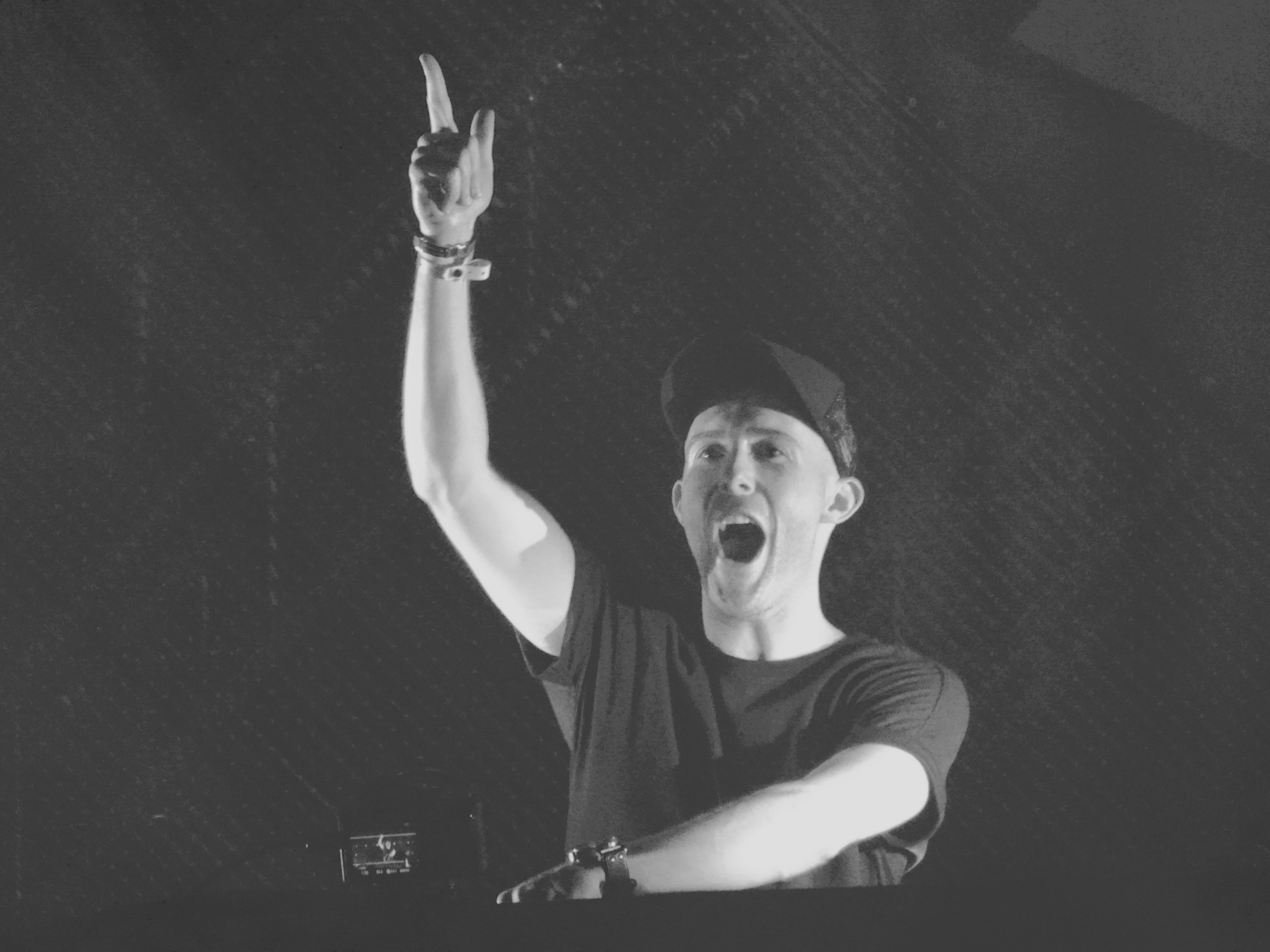
- Delete during the 2017 edition of Defqon.1

Background information
- Born: Ryan Christopher Biggs; 1991 or 1992
- Died: 30 April 2022 Waalwijk, Netherlands
- Genres: Hardcore; Hardstyle
- Occupations: Record producer; DJ
- Website: deletedj.com

Ryan Christopher Biggs (died 30 April 2022), known as DJ Delete, was an Australian disc jockey. He died in the Netherlands, aged 30.

== Discography ==
=== Album ===
- Minimal Techno · 2009
- Pure Spoonage · 2010
- Malfunction EP · 2010
- Formula EP · 2011
- Sanctum · 2013
- DJ Networx, Volume 60 · 2014
- Louder Than a Bomb · 2016
- Hard Bass 2017 · 2017
- Point of No Return · 2017
- 2018 EP · 2018
- Alpha Omega · 2018
- Strive for Domination · 2019

== Death ==
Biggs was found dead in 2022 at his home in Waalwijk, Netherlands. He was 30 years old, and no cause of death was given.
