= Ronald K. Hambleton =

Ronald Kenneth Hambleton (June 27, 1943 – April 28, 2022) was an American academic and psychometrician. He is known for his contributions to item response theory, score reporting, standard setting, and other topics in the field of psychometrics and educational measurement.

Hambleton was born in Hamilton, Ontario, Canada in 1943. He received a B.A. from the University of Waterloo in 1966 and a Ph.D. from the University of Toronto in 1969. He joined the University of Massachusetts, Amherst, as an assistant professor in 1969. He founded the Research, Educational Measurement, and Psychometrics (REMP) Program at the university. The university held a conference in his honor in 2012 and published the book "Educational Measurement From Foundations to Future" based on presentations at the conference. Hambleton retired from University of Massachusetts, Amherst as a Professor Emeritus in 2019.

Hambleton won the Award for Career contributions from the American Educational Research Association, the American Psychological Association, the Association of Test Publishers, the International Test Commission, and the National Council on Measurement in Education. He served as the president of National Council on Measurement in Education. He was a member of the National Academy of Education and a fellow of APA.

Hambleton published over 300 journal articles and books. Some of the books that he has authored or edited are "Item Response Theory: Principles and Applications" published in 1985, "Fundamentals of Item Response Theory" published in 1991, "Advances in Educational and Psychological Testing: Theory and Applications" published in 1991, "Handbook of Modern Item Response Theory" published in 1997, and "Adapting Educational and Psychological Tests for Cross-Cultural Assessment" published in 2005.
