= Jin Di (actress) =

Chinese actress (1933–2022)

- 金迪
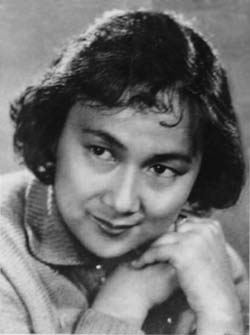
- Born: 金慧琴; 25 February 1933; Shanghai, China
- Died: 3 April 2022 (aged 89); Beijing, China
- Occupation: Actress

Jin Huiqin (Chinese: 金慧琴; 25 February 1933 – 3 April 2022), known by her stage name Jin Di (Chinese: 金迪), was a Chinese film actress, television director and screenwriter.

== Biography ==
In 1950, Jin joined the Northeast Anshan City Art Troupe as a dancer. In 1952, she entered the performance department of the Northeast Luxun Academy of Literature and Art and from next year has been an actress of the Northeast People's Art Theater. Since 1958, she started her film career. In 1985, she moved to the fishing village in Shenzhen and two years after - transferred to Shenzhen Satellite TV as a director, filming TV dramas and musicals. In 2019, Jin left Shenzhen and went to Beijing.

Jin Di has been awarded a number of times.

== Personal life ==
Di's husband, Cui Yifeng, was a photographer, who dubbed Gorky in the Soviet film Gorky Trilogy.

== Death ==
Di died of illness in Beijing on 3 April 2022, at the age of 89.

== Selected filmography ==
- Blooming Flowers and Full Moon (花好月圆) (1958) as Yuan Xiao-Jun
- Youth in Our Village (我們村里的年輕人) (1959) as Kong Shu-Zhen
- Beam with Smiles (笑逐顏開) (1959) as Luo Yu-Hua
- Youth in Our Village 2 (我們村里的年輕人（續集）) (1963) as Kong Shu-Zhen
- My Ten Classmates (我的十个同学) (1979)
- A Love-Forsaken Corner (被爱情遗忘的角落) (1981)
- Wild Geese Flying To North (大雁北飞) (1982)
- The Wedding Maidens (出嫁女) (1990) as Xin Liang
- My Wonderful Roommate (我的奇妙室友) (2021) as 6800
