= China Publishers' Yearbook =

- Genre: Media yearbook and directory
- Publisher: Commercial Press; China Publishers' Yearbook Press
- Publication date: 1980–present
- Publication place: China
- ISBN: 978-0-9793693-1-5

The China Publishers' Yearbook (traditional Chinese: 中國出版年鑑; simplified Chinese: 中国出版年鉴), also translated into English as China Publishing Yearbook or China Publications Yearbook, is a large-scale information tool that reflects the basic situation of editing, publishing and distribution of books and newspapers in the People's Republic of China.

The content of China Publishers' Yearbook mainly records and reflects the new situation, achievements and information on the publication of books, newspapers and periodicals in China during the previous year.

Inaugurated in 1980, based in Beijing, China Publishers' Yearbook was initially edited by the Publishers Association of China (中国出版工作者协会) and published by the Commercial Press, and later by the China Publishers' Yearbook Press.
