= Zhonghua Book Company =

Chinese-language humanities publisher

- Simplified Chinese: 中华书局有限公司
- Traditional Chinese: 中華書局有限公司
Transcriptions
Standard Mandarin
- Hanyu Pinyin: Zhōnghuá Shūjú Yoǔxìangōngsī
- Wade–Giles: Chung1-hua2 Shu1-chü2 Yu3-hsien4-kung1-ssu1

Chung Hwa Book Co., Ltd.
- Simplified Chinese: 上海中华书局有限公司
- Traditional Chinese: 上海中華書局有限公司
Transcriptions
Standard Mandarin
- Hanyu Pinyin: Shànghǎi Zhōnghuá Shūjú Yǒuxiàngōngsī
- Wade–Giles: Shang4-hai3 Chung1-hua2 Shu1-chü2 Yu3-hsien4-kung1-ssu1

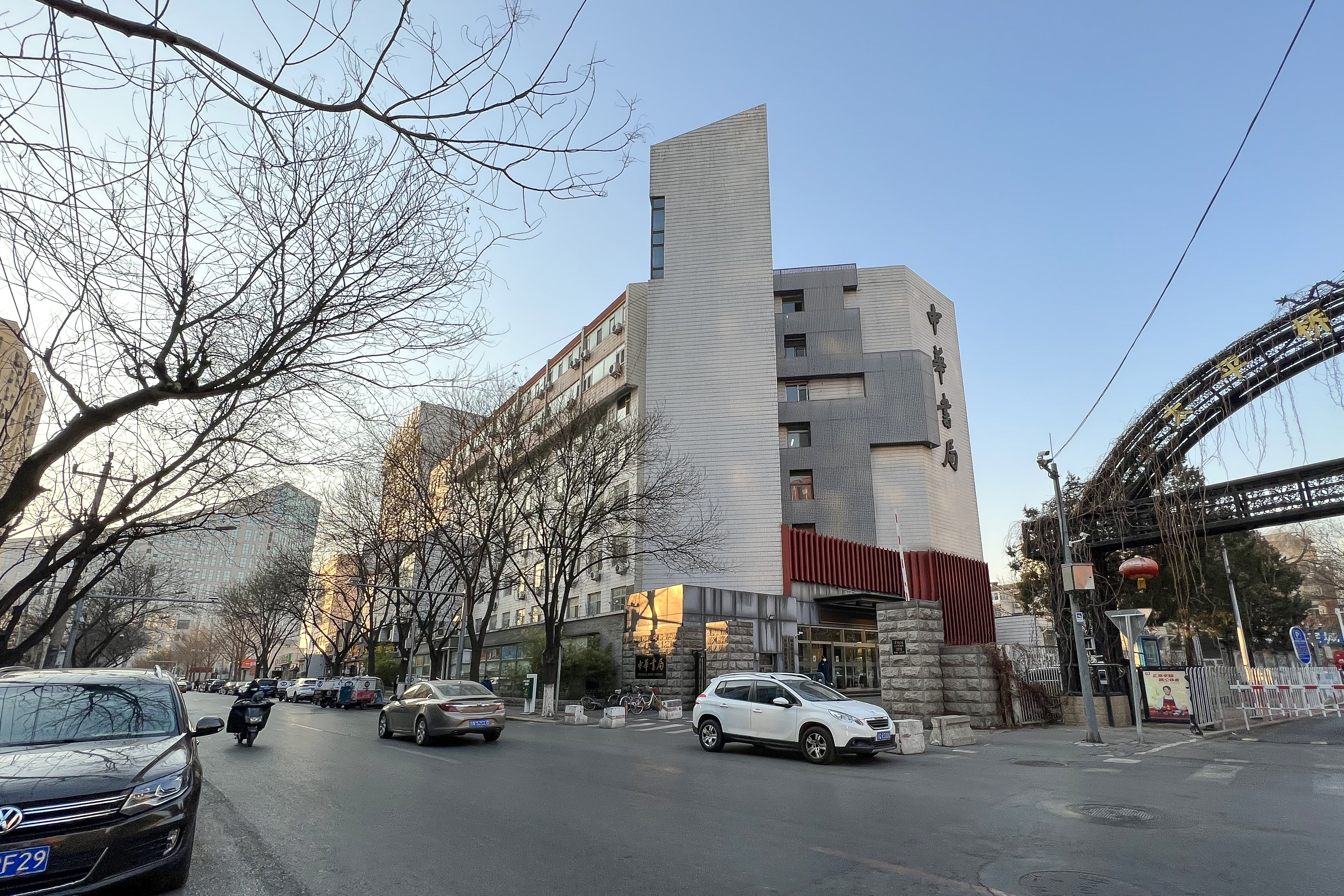
Headquarters in Beijing in 2023

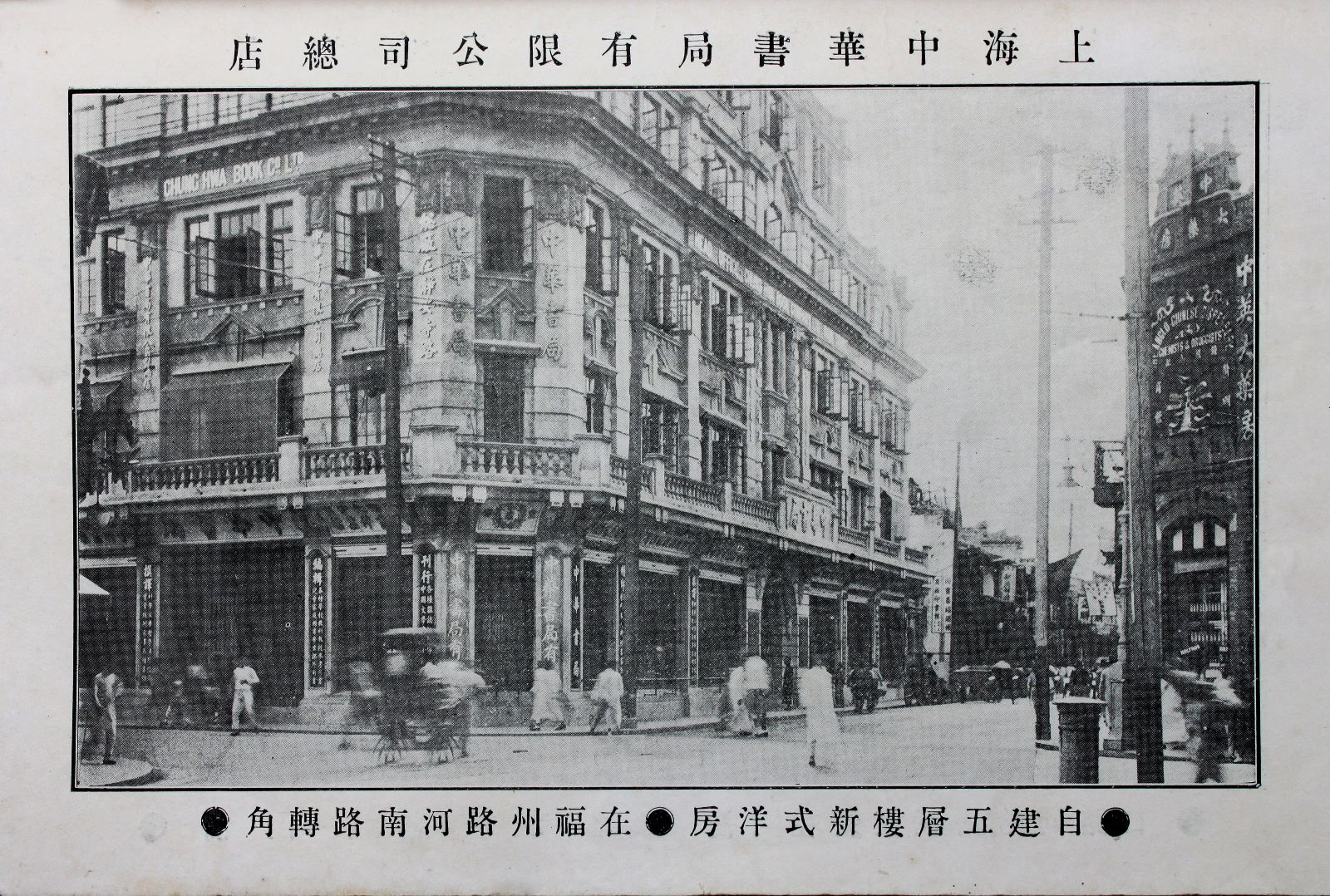
The headquarters of Zhonghua Book Company in Fuzhou Road, Shanghai, China in 1916

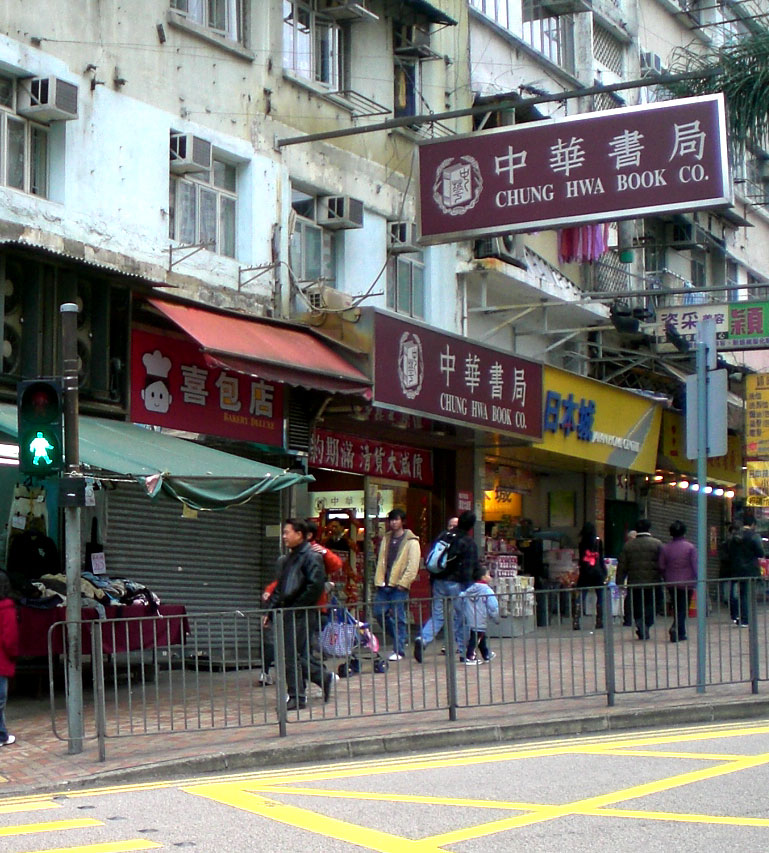
Chung Hwa store in Kwun Tong District, Hong Kong (closed)

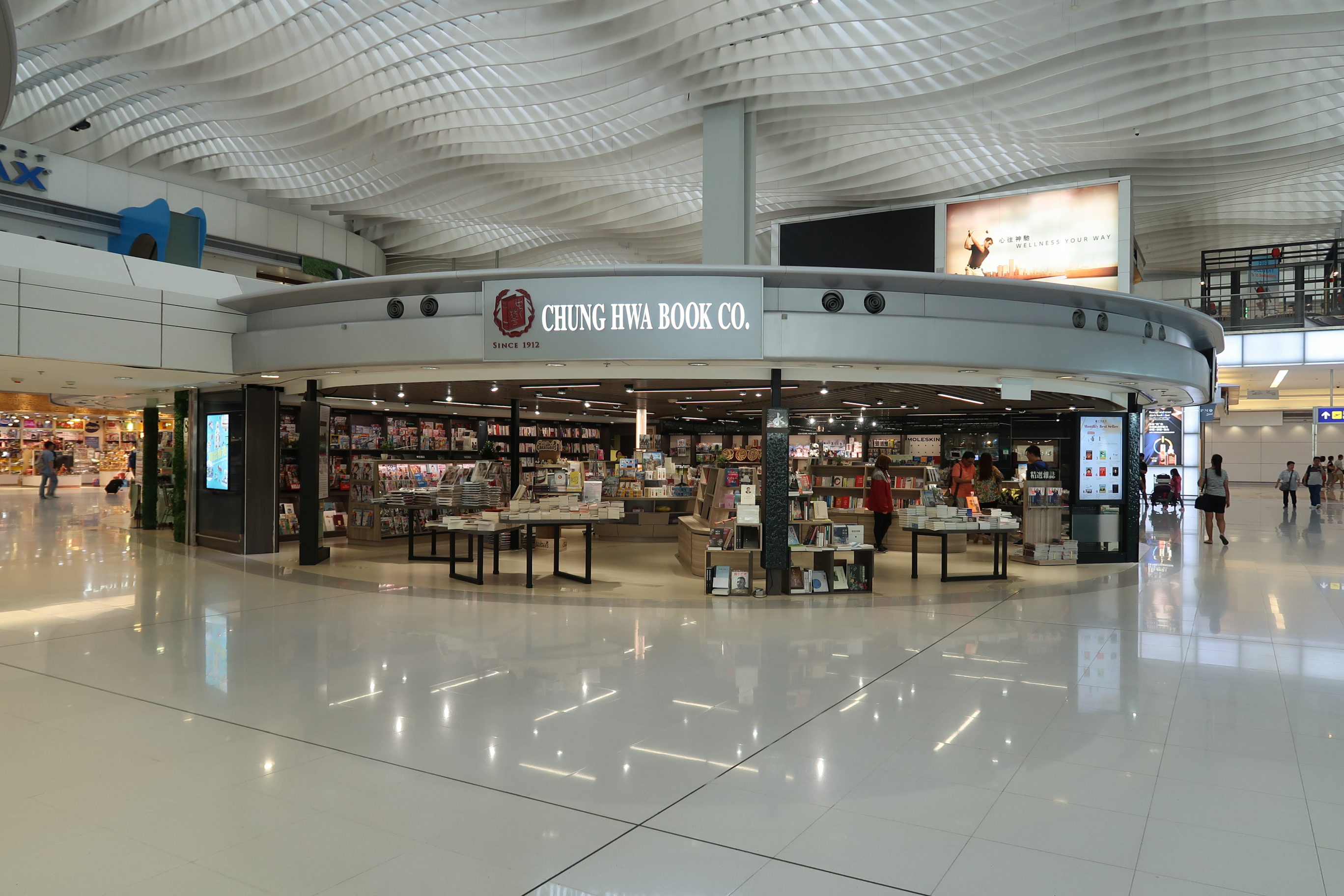
Chung Hwa Book store in Hong Kong International Airport

Zhonghua Book Company (simplified Chinese: 中华书局有限公司; traditional Chinese: 中華書局有限公司; pinyin: Zhōnghuá Shūjú Yoǔxìan Gōngsī), formerly spelled Chunghwa or Chung-hua Shu-chü, and sometimes translated as Zhonghua Publishing House, are Chinese publishing houses that focuses on the humanities, especially classical Chinese works. Currently it has split into a few separate companies. The main headquarters is in Beijing, while Chung Hwa Book Company (Hong Kong) is headquartered in Hong Kong. The Taiwan branch is headquartered in Taipei.

== History ==
The company was founded in Shanghai on 1 January 1912 as the Chung Hwa Book Co., Ltd. (上海中華書局有限公司) by Lufei Kui, a former manager of the Commercial Press, another Shanghai-based publisher that had been established in 1897. From the year of its foundation to the birth of the People's Republic of China in 1949, it published about 5,700 titles, excluding reprints.

The Chung Hwa Book Co., Ltd. was one of the companies that printed banknotes for the Central Bank of China from 1931 to 1949.

Zhonghua's punctuated editions of the Twenty-Four Histories have become standard. The publishing project, which started in 1959 on a suggestion by Mao Zedong, was completed in 1977. A revised edition of the entire set integrating the most recent scholarship on the Histories is being prepared.

On December 19, 2011, The China Publishing and Media Holdings Company (中国出版传媒股份有限公司) was founded to become the parent company of the Zhonghua Book Company.

== Subsidiaries ==
- Shanghai Zhonghua Printing Co., Ltd. (上海中华印刷有限公司): Originally established in 1912 as Chung Hwa Book Co., Shanghai (中華書局印刷所). In 1966, it was renamed to Zhonghua Printing Factory (上海中华印刷厂). In 1988, it was changed into a limited liability company according to the Company Law of the People's Republic of China in 1998. In 2008, Shanghai Zhonghua Printing Co., Ltd. was moved to Qingpu Industrial Park.

=== Former subsidiaries ===
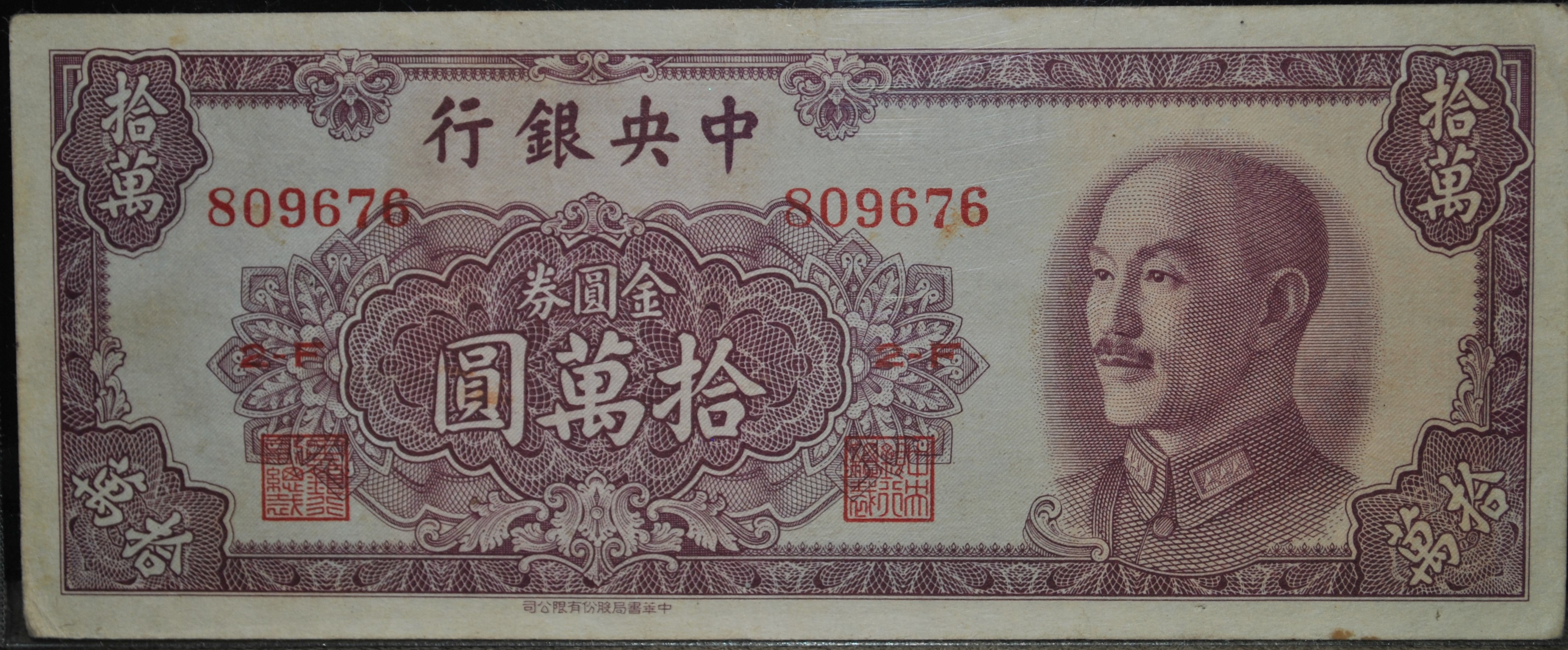
- Central Bank of China 100,000 Gold Yuan 1949 printed by Chung Hwa Book Co., Ltd.
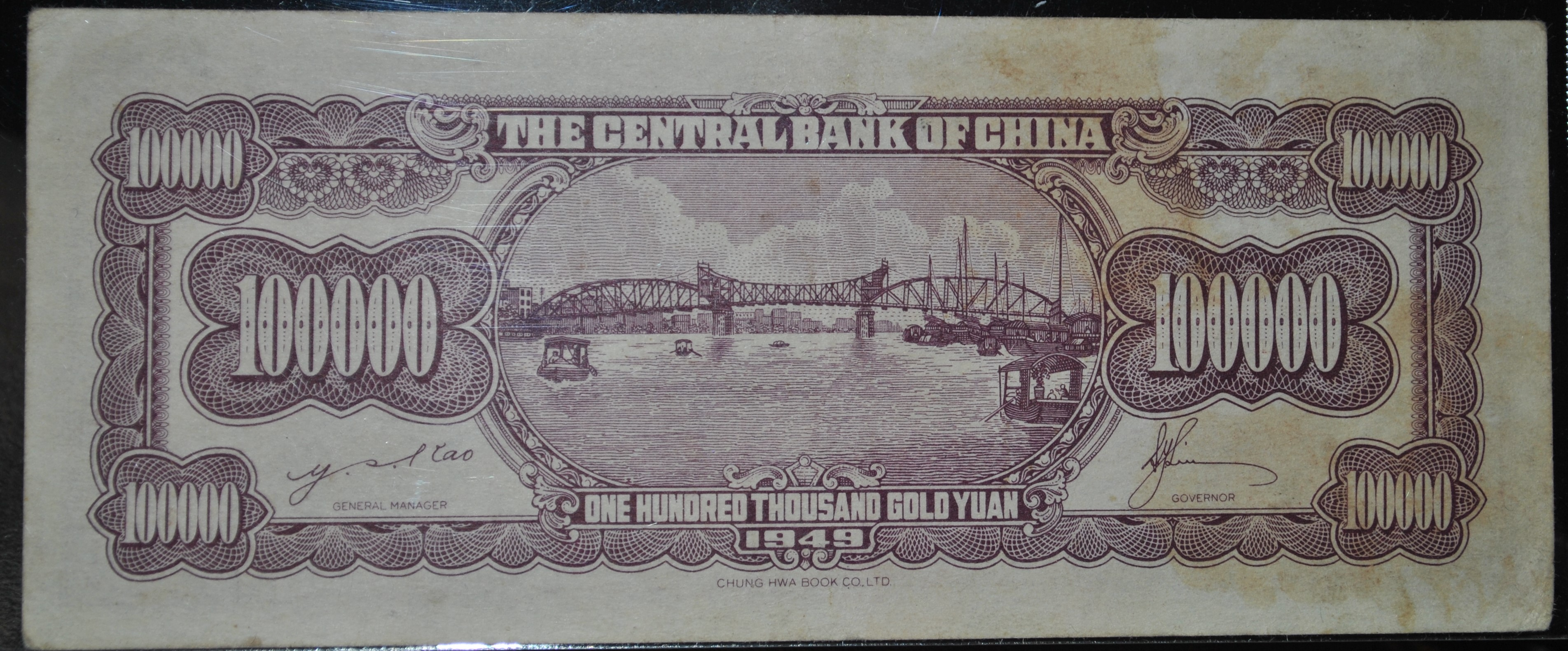
  Reverse with Chung Hwa Book Co., Ltd. at bottom centre
  Chung Hwa Book Company, Limited (台灣中華書局股份有限公司): Originally established in 1945 in Taipei, Taiwan. In August 1949, the Chung Hwa Book's Shanghai headquarter was relocated to Taipei. Chung Hwa Book Company, Limited (中華書局股份有限公司) was registered in Hong Kong in 1949-01-20. The Taiwan headquarters was officially separated from the Chung Hwa Book operations in PRC in 1950-10-08. The Taiwanese company was later registered in 1951 in Taiwan, and renamed to Chung Hwa Book Company, Limited (台灣中華書局股份有限公司) in 1952-09-19. The Hong Kong registration was renewed in 1984-08-31 under the old registered names, but with location set to People's Republic of China.
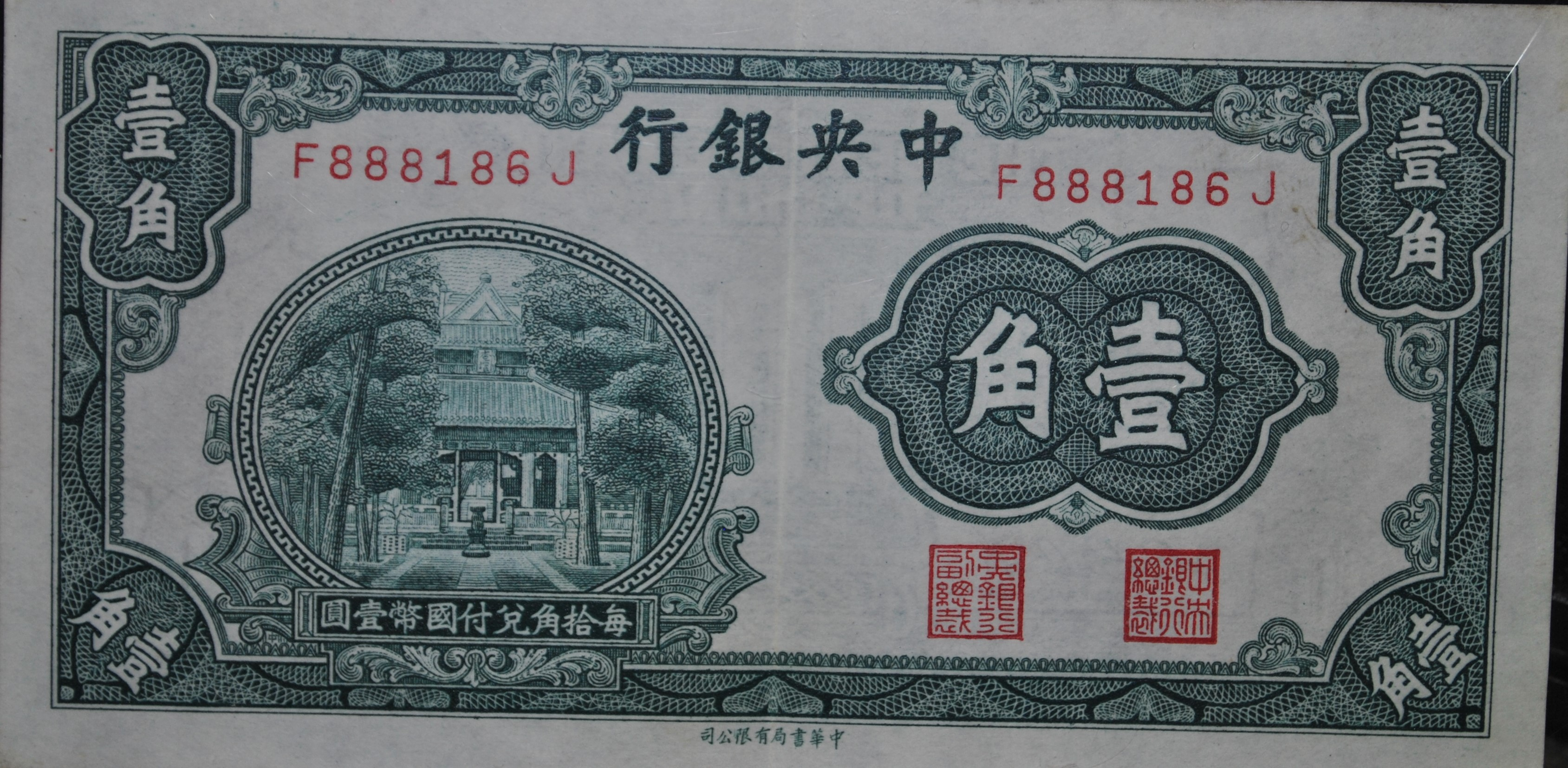
- Central Bank of China 1931 (no date) 10 cents
  Chung Hwa Book Company (Hong Kong) Limited (中華書局(香港)有限公司): Originally established in 1927 in Queen's Road Central, Hong Kong. In 1988, it was renamed to Chung Hwa Book Company (Hong Kong) Limited (中華書局(香港)有限公司) and re-registered as a subsidiary of Sino United Publishing (Holdings) Limited (香港聯合出版（集團）有限公司), with incorporation on 1988-06-16.

- Enjoy Time (慢讀時光): A branch of Chung Hwa Book Co. (H.K.) Ltd., located in Hong Kong Central Library.
- Manga Shop (動漫世界): A branch of Chung Hwa Book Co. (H.K.) Ltd. specializing in Japanese comic books and a dealer of the Japanese chain Animate, located in Mong Kok. Established in 2012, the name was changed to Manga Shop when a prior Animate shop had opened in Hong Kong over a decade ago.

- Chung Hwa Book Company (Singapore) Pte Limited (中華書局(新加坡)有限公司): Originally established in 1923, it was incorporated on 27 October 1989 as a limited private company. As of 2016, it is a subsidiary of Sino United Publishing (Holdings) Limited.
- Shanghai Lexicographical Publishing House (上海辞书出版社): Founded in August 1958 as Ci Hai Editing Institute (中华书局辞海编辑所) under the Beijing company. In January 1978, it was renamed to the current name. As of 2016, it is owned by Shanghai Century Publishing(Group) Co., Ltd.

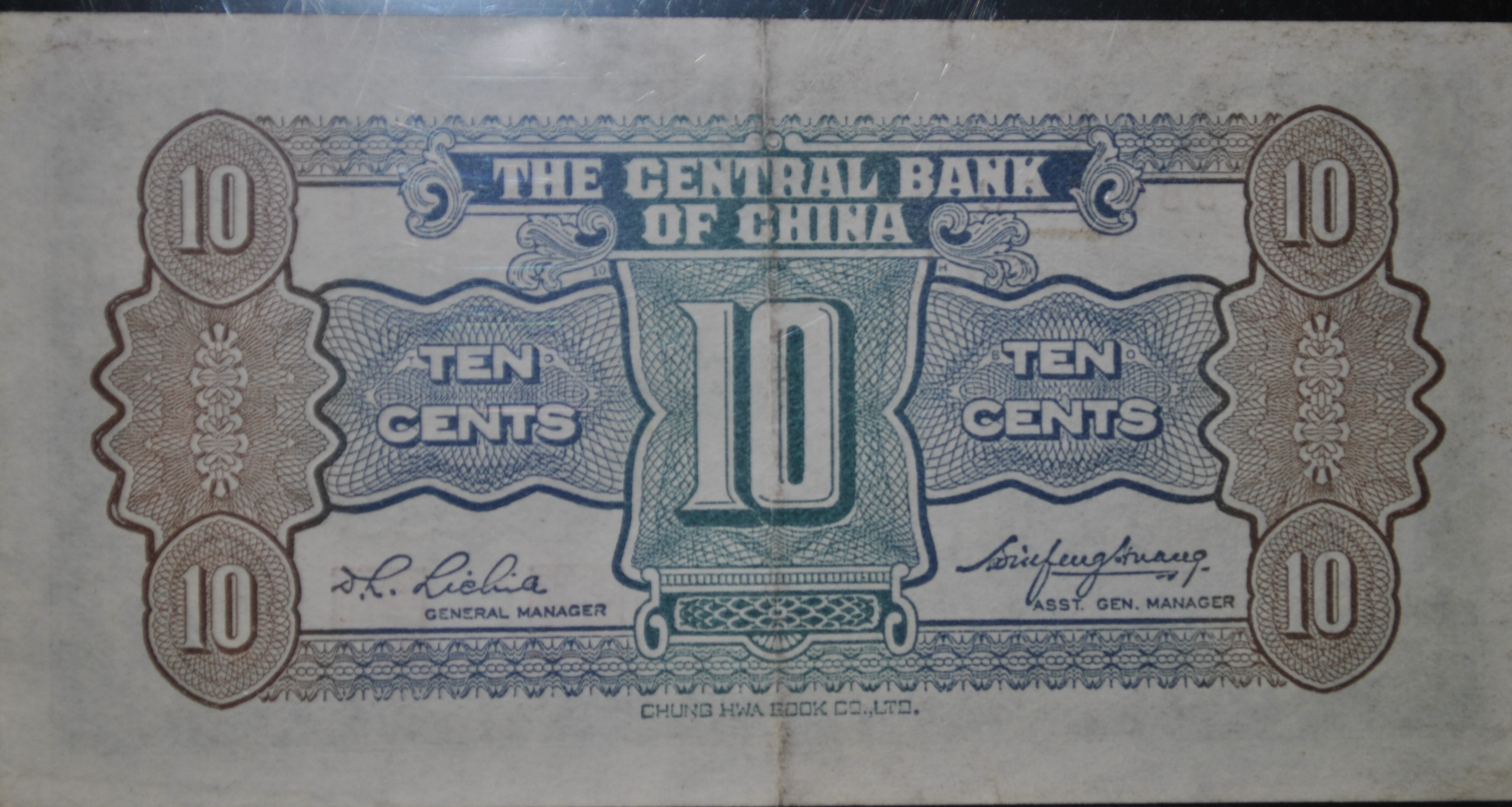
- Reverse with Chung Hwa Book Co., Ltd.
  ? (中华书局图书馆): Originally established in 1916 within the Zheng An road factory. In 1925, it was renamed to its current name (中华书局图书馆). In 1935, it was moved into the 4th floor of the newly built Macau factory. Between April and June 1978, it was moved to the Ci Hai Editing Institute building at Shanxi North Road, which was later owned by Shanghai Lexicographical Publishing House.

- ? (中華書局香港印刷廠): Originally established in 1933 in Pak Tai Street, To Kwa Wan, Kowloon as a printer for CHBC's Hong Kong branch. In 1980, it was merged with ? (商務印書館香港印刷廠) and ? (大千印刷公司) into C & C Joint Printing Co., (H.K.) Ltd. (中華商務聯合印刷（香港）有限公司).

== Representative publications ==
- Zizhi Tongjian (1956)
- Guwen Guanzhi (1959)
- Twenty-Four Histories (1959–1977)
- The Analects of Confucius, Annotated and Translated (by Yang Bojun, 1980)
- Records of the Grand Historian (1982)
- The Classic of Poetry, Annotated and Analyzed (by Cheng Junying 程俊英 and Jiang Jianyuan 蔣見元, 1991)
- Wang Li Character Dictionary of Ancient Chinese (2000)

== Book series ==
- Er tong wen xue cong shu, gu shi [= Children's literature story series]
- Er tong wen xue cong shu, xiao shuo [= Children's literature fiction series]
- Er tong yi shu cong shu [= Children's art series]
- Xinzhì zhonghua xiushen jiaokeshu [= New Chung Hwa Ethical Readers; Newly Compiled Chinese Moral Education Textbooks] (1913- )
- Shanghai shi zheng fu she hui ju lao gong tong ji kan wu [= Shanghai labor statistics series]
- Shi jie shao nian wen xue ming zhu [= World youth literature series]
- Student's English Library
- Sulian er tong wen xue cong kan [= Russian children's literature series]
- Wu cai xin tu hua gu shi cong kan [= Five-color picture story books series] (1951-)
- Xiao peng you wen ku [= Literary treasure for little friends (also referred to as: Children's library)]
- Xue sheng cong shu [= Student's series]
- Ying wen xue sheng cong shu [=Ying Wen student series]
