= An Anecdotal History of the Revolution =

Book By Feng Ziyou

- Author: Feng Ziyou
- Language: Traditional Chinese
- Publication date: 1936
- Publication place: Republic of China

An Anecdotal History of the Revolution or Unofficial History of the Revolution (Chinese: 革命逸史), also translated as Historical Records beyond the History of the 1911 Revolution, Unofficial History of the 1911 Revolution, is a book written by Feng Ziyou based on the China Daily and his own many years of notes, correspondence, and other materials.

Feng found that most of the history books published in China at that time were superficial and uninformative, and most Chinese people had forgotten almost all about the Xinhai Revolution and liked to slander these revolutionary predecessors. Feng was very dissatisfied with this status quo, and he thought that this was the key to the survival of the Republic of China, thus, in 1936, he began to write the Unofficial History of the Revolution, which was not fully completed until 1948.

An Anecdotal History of the Revolution was first published in 1936, but the volumes were not all published at one time. The first volume was published by the Shanghai Commercial Press in 1939, the second in 1943, the third in 1945, the fourth in 1946, and the fifth in 1947. Due to changes in the political situation, the sixth was published in 1981.
