= Robert K. Yin =

American social scientist

Yin Kuo-zuir
- Traditional Chinese: 應國瑞
- Simplified Chinese: 应国瑞
Transcriptions
Standard Mandarin
- Hanyu Pinyin: Yīng Guóruì

Robert Kuo-zuir Yin (March 31,1941 – April 24, 2026) was an American social scientist and president of COSMOS Corporation, known for his work on case study research as well as on qualitative research. Over the years, his work on case study research has been frequently cited. Google Scholar listed it as the second most cited methodological work, qualitative or quantitative, over a 20-year period

== Life and work ==
Yin was born and grew up in New York City as the son of Yin Huo-Chin (应和春; Yīng Héchūn) and How Loo Yuin (夏璐; Xià Lù). His maternal grandfather is Xia Ruifang, one of the founders of Commercial Press.

Yin obtained his BA in history, magna cum laude, from Harvard College in 1962, and successfully pursued his graduate studies at Massachusetts Institute of Technology, where he obtained his PhD in brain and cognitive sciences in 1970.

While at graduate school, Yin published his first articles on face recognition, in the field of experimental psychology and neuroscience. Later, his research interests shifted to the use of case study research and qualitative research in public policy and related topics. An exemplary example of a case study, relying on both qualitative and quantitative methods, covered organizational innovations in public services.

More broadly, Yin's text on case study research received the McGuffey Longevity Award in 2019, as a text that had been published for over 30 years and that was still in print. During these years, the text has been translated into eight languages: Chinese, Japanese, Korean, Swedish, Romanian, Italian, Polish, and Portuguese.

In 1980, Yin founded COSMOS Corporation. He developed COSMOS as a research corporation for "applied research and evaluation, technical support, and management assistance aimed at improving public policy, private enterprise, and collaborative ventures." The firm has completed research studies for such sponsors as: The MacArthur Foundation, the Mott Foundation, The Ford Foundation, the National Science Foundation, the US Dept. of Education, the US Dept. of Health and Human Services, the National Institute of Mental Health, and the National Institute of Justice.

Yin has also been affiliated with the University of Copenhagen, the RAND Corporation, the United Nations Development Programme, and the School for International Service at American University. More recently, he has worked with faculty and students at the School of Education at Southern New Hampshire University, as well as the Division of Special Education and disAbility Research at George Mason University. He has collaborated regularly on evaluation projects with The World Bank.

Yin was married to Karen A. Kaufman-Yin; they were parents to three children. He passed away at the age of 85 in North Bethesda, MD.

== Selected publications ==
- Yin, Robert K. Case study research: Design and methods. Sage publications, 1984; 1989; 1994; 2003; 2009; 2014.
- Yin, Robert K. Case study research and applications: Design and methods. Sage publications, 2018
- Yin, Robert K. Qualitative research from start to finish. Guilford Press, 2010; 2016.
- Yin, Robert K. Applications of case study research. Sage, 2011.

Articles, a selection

- Yin, Robert K. "Looking at upside-down faces." Journal of experimental psychology 81.1 (1969): 141-145.
- Yin, Robert K. "Face recognition by brain-injured patients: a dissociable ability?." Neuropsychologia 8.4 (1970): 395-402.
- Yin, Robert K. "The case study crisis: Some answers." Administrative science quarterly (1981): 58-65.
- Yin, Robert K. "The case study as a serious research strategy." Science communication 3.1 (1981): 97-114.
