= Xia Ruifang =

Chinese publisher

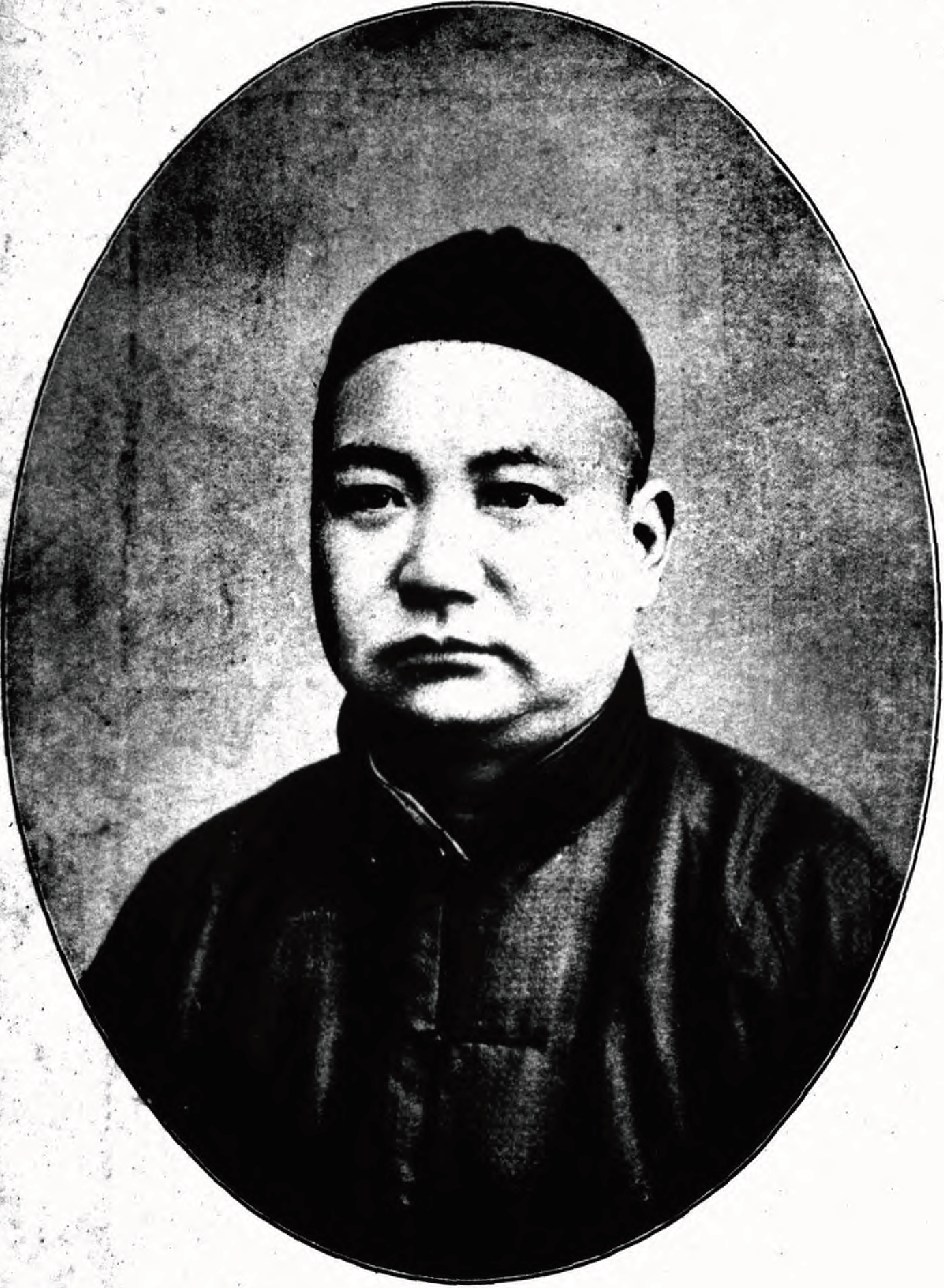
- Born: 1871; Qingpu District, Shanghai, China
- Died: 10 January 1914 (aged 42–43); Huangpu, Shanghai
- Occupations: Author, editor, publisher

Chinese name
- Chinese: 夏瑞芳
Transcriptions
Standard Mandarin
- Hanyu Pinyin: Xià Ruìfāng

Xia Ruifang (Chinese: 夏瑞芳; pinyin: Xià Ruìfāng; 1871 – 10 January 1914), courtesy name Cuifang (Chinese: 粹芳; pinyin: Cuìfāng), was a Chinese publisher. Known as "China's first publisher", he co-founded the Commercial Press in 1897 and oversaw its operations until his assassination in 1914.

== Early life ==
Xia Ruifang was born in 1871 in Qingpu District near Shanghai. His mother was a baomu (part-nurse, part-maid) who worked for the family of John Marshall Willoughby Farnham. At age 11, Xia and his mother moved to Shanghai and attended the Presbyterian Qingxin Hall school, which Farnham was the director of. At Qingxin, Xia learnt printing and interned at the American Presbyterian Mission Press. Graduating in 1889, he found employment as a typesetter at the Chinese-language Wenhui bao and subsequently the English-language North China Herald.

== Career ==
Unhappy with his treatment at the Herald, Xia decided to found his own publishing firm with the help of Qingxin schoolmates Bao Xianen, Bao Xianchang, and Gao Fengchi. Their first project, a Chinese translation of an English textbook, sold some three thousand copies. Spurred by the success of their maiden venture, the four partners quickly invested in printing presses from Japan and established their headquarters at a three-room shop near Jiangxi Lane; the Baos' sisters christened the start-up Shangwu yinshu guan or The Commercial Press. In 1898, the company acquired the Japanese printshop Xiuwen yinshuaju and relocated to larger premises, this time a twelve-room building along Shunqing Lane in Beijing Road. Xia was credited with being the "brains" of the group who secured funding while the Baos did the actual printing; Gao continued working for the American Presbyterian Mission Press. In 1902, a fire destroyed most of the equipment that the Press had inherited from Xiuwen, although the company was still able to publish five new volumes of its English-Chinese textbook.

As the company was short on manpower, Xia had to juggle many roles, including editor, manager, proofreader, and accountant; he even personally went down to the firm's paper supplier in Pudong to collect paper. With a monthly salary of twenty-four yuan, Xia had to sell insurance for a side income. Following a series of botched translation projects, Xia was faced with a cash flow problem; he was advised by his writer friend Bao Tianxiao to establish a proper editorial office and invite new partners to better manage the business. In 1901, Xia managed to convince the Hanlin scholar Zhang Yuanji to invest in his company; Sheng in turn recruited a partner and the company, now renamed to Shangwu yinshu guan gufen youxian gongsi or Commercial Press, Limited, saw its capital rise from 3,750 to 50,000 yuan.

Now able to publish his own books, Xia moved to a retail space in Henan Road and purchased a building on Fujian North Road that he converted into a workshop. The Commercial Press' first editorial office was established in Tangjia Lane and staffed by some four or five persons personally recommended by Zhang, with the philosopher Cai Yuanpei serving as supervising editor. Seeing it as a chance to improve the country's educational system, Cai handpicked educators from Nanyang Public Institute (now Shanghai Jiao Tong University), including Jiang Weiqiao and Wu Danchu to edit textbooks on a diverse list of topics including Chinese literature, history, and geography. With the introduction of Zhang Yuanji and associates, there were now two camps in the company: the "Church Band" led by the Bao brothers and comprising Ningbo Presbyterians, and the "Scholars' School" led by Zhang and comprising intellectuals from Fujian, Jiangsu, and Zhejiang. Xia identified with the former group but ensured that there would be no conflict between the two.

However, in 1902, the company's textbook projects came to a standstill after Cai Yuanpei fled to Qingdao to avoid prosecution for sedition; Zhang took over as supervising editor a year later and enacted sweeping changes that allowed the firm to fend off competitors like Kkinkodo, Wenming, and Nanyang. The textbook collection envisaged by Cai finally came to fruition in 1904 after a series of major overhauls and a record-breaking few hundred thousand copies were sold in a few months, thus establishing the Commercial Press as the unrivalled leader in then Chinese publication industry. They would continue to "utterly dominate" the textbook market in China, which had previously been largely untapped, until around 1911.

== Personal life and death ==
Xia was a practising Chinese Christian who married one of the sisters of his Commercial Press co-founders, the Bao brothers. On 10 January 1914, at approximately 17:00 local time, Xia was stabbed to death in front of the company's Henan Road location, at age 43. He was reportedly killed for voicing his dissatisfaction with the military actions of Chen Qimei. Yet it was also speculated that Xia's competitors may have sanctioned his assassination, as just four days before he had attempted to acquire rival firm Kinkodo which had invested in the Commercial Press. A third theory, promulgated by a San Diego news article about Xia's American descendants, conjectures that Xia was killed by Chinese jingoist for his Chinese translations of the Bible. Xia was replaced by Gao Fengchi as general manager and Zhang Yuanji as manager.

Xia Ruifang is now regarded as "China's first publisher" who founded the country's first "modern publishing company". His grandson is Robert K. Yin.
