= Chung Hwa Book Company (Hong Kong) =

Bookstore chain in Hong Kong

Chung Hwa Book Company (Hong Kong) Limited
- Type: Private limited company
- Industry: Publishing and distribution
- Founded: June 16, 1988
- Headquarters: Room B, 1/F, North Point Industrial Building, 499 King's Road, North Point, Hong Kong
- Owner: Sino United Publishing
- Website: www.chunghwabook.com.hk

Chung Hwa Book Company (Chinese: 中華書局) is a Hong Kong publishing house and bookstore chain. Founded in 1927, the company has been operating in Hong Kong for over ninety years, dedicated to "promoting Chinese culture and building modern civilization". And it used to print currency notes.

== History ==
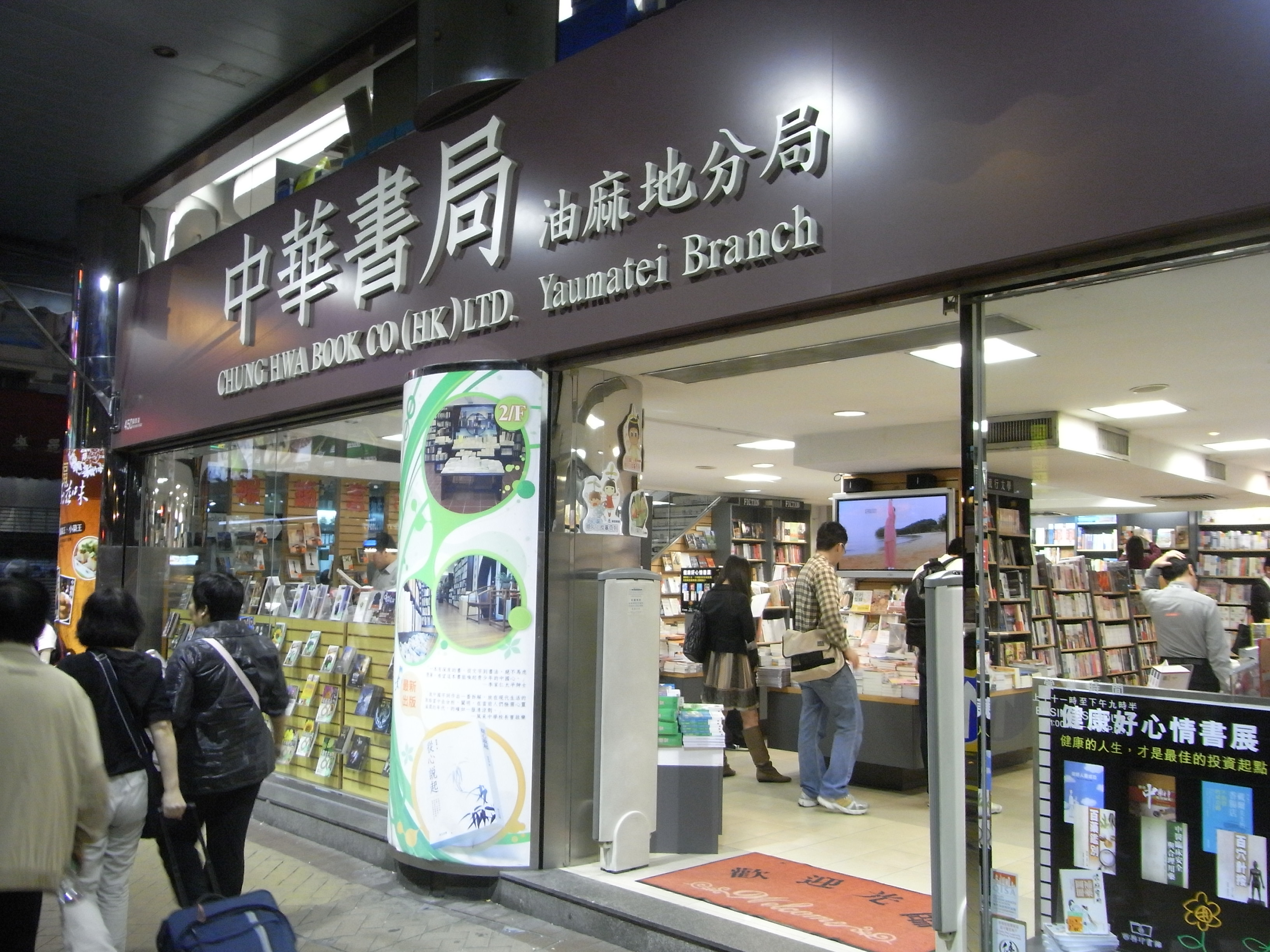
Yau Ma Tei Branch

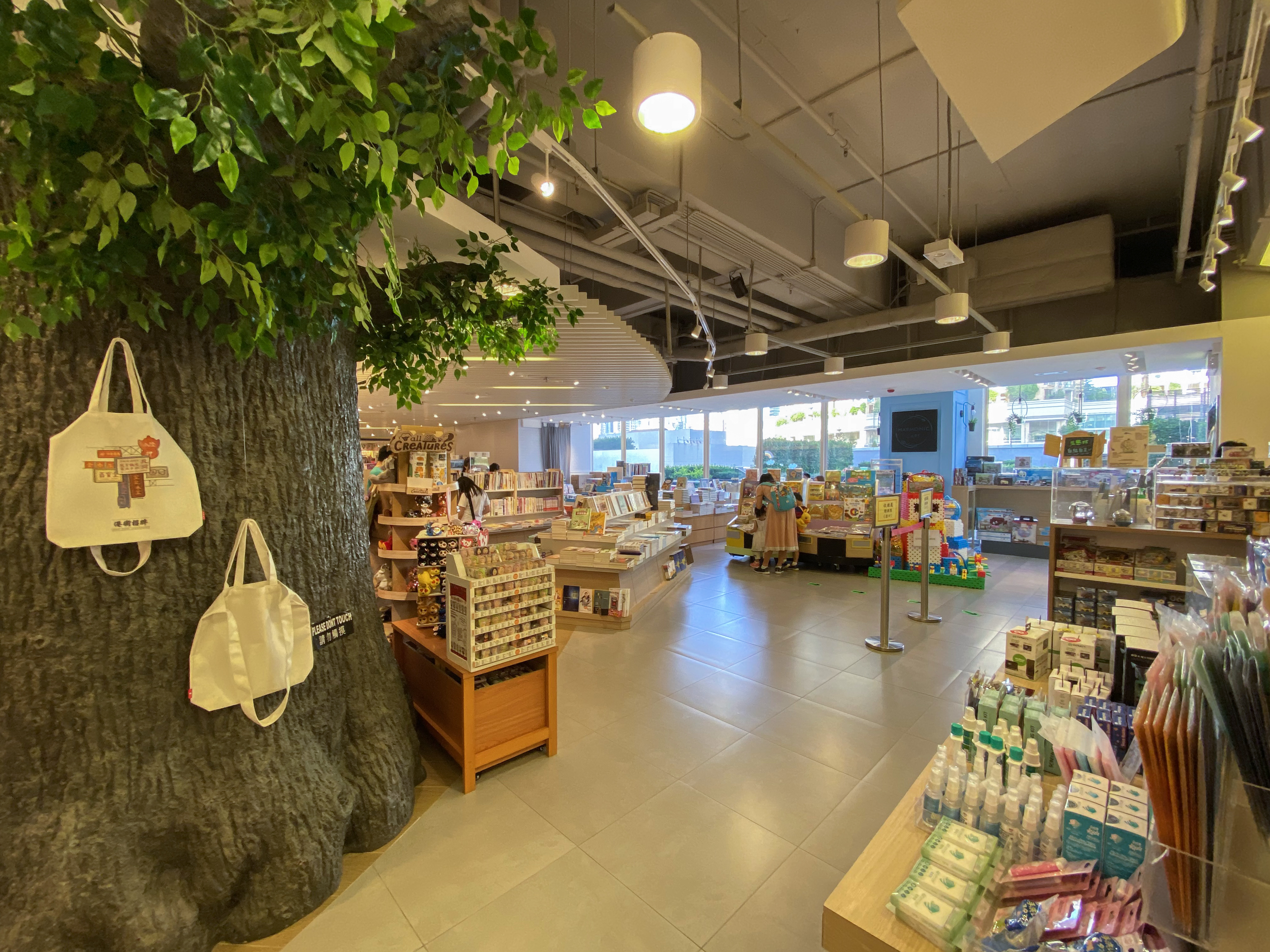
Branch located in Tsuen Wan Plaza

In 1912, the Chung Hwa Book Company was founded in Shanghai.

In 1927, the Hong Kong branch was established.

During the Japanese occupation of Hong Kong (from 25 December 1941 to 15 August 1945) in the World War Two, the company used to print currency notes of HK$50 and HK$100.

From the 1950s to 1970s, Hong Kong Chung Hwa released around 850 types of books, more than one-third of which were about Chinese civilization.

In 1979, the Chung Hwa Book Company opened a flagship store in Yau Ma Tei, Kowloon.

In 1988, the Hong Kong branch of the Chung Hwa Book Company was reorganized and registered as "Chung Hwa Book Company (Hong Kong) Limited", and became a member of the Sino United Publishing.

In 1991, the Chung Hwa Book Company's Tsuen Wan Plaza branch opened.

In 2001, the Chung Hwa Book Company's "Slow Reading Time" concept store opened.

In 2012, the Manga Shop was established in Mong Kok. It was a branch of Chung Hwa Book Co. (H.K.) Ltd. specializing in Japanese comic books and a dealer of the Japanese chain Animate.

In 2016, the Chung Hwa Book Company replaced the closed Yip Yi Tong and opened 5 branches at the Hong Kong International Airport.

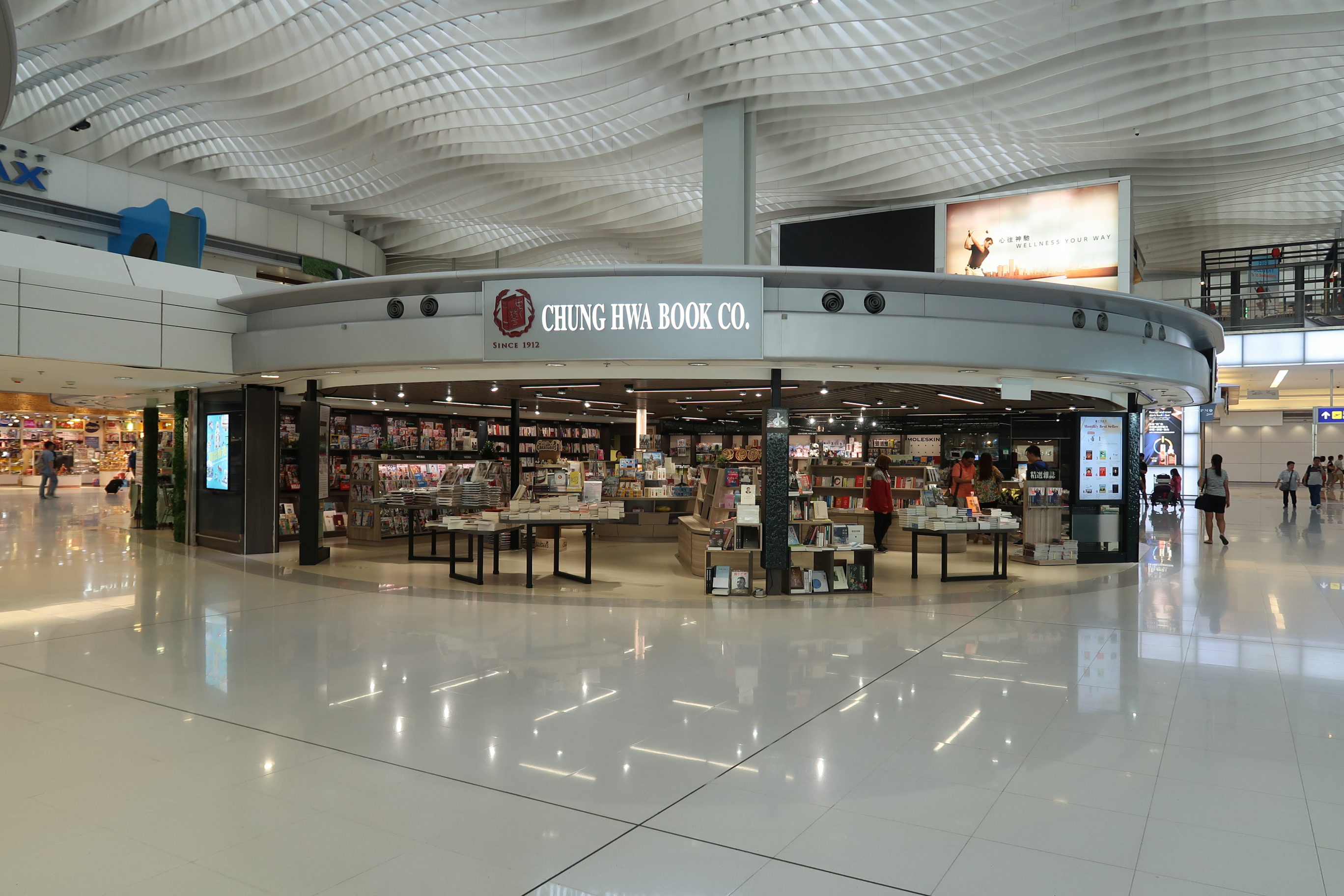
Airport Branch Office at Terminal 2 of Hong Kong International Airport

== Operations ==
Chung Hwa Book Company (Hong Kong) has developed into a comprehensive cultural publishing organization that operates multiple businesses such as publishing, retail, and direct sales. There are stores in Causeway Bay Central Library, Yau Ma Tei and other areas. Its sub-brands include Feifan Publishing, Kaiming Bookstore, Animation World, Slow Reading Time, etc.

Chung Hwa provides publications on Chinese history and culture, classical works of literature and philosophy, essays on contemporary China, children's readings and dictionaries, and books on popular culture and self-improvement. Among them, the seventh edition of the "New Chinese Dictionary" won the Japanese Good Design Award in 2018.

== Prizes won ==
Chung Hwa has won numerous local and international book prizes including:

- Hong Kong Book Prize,
- Hong Kong Publishing Biennial Awards,
- Taipei International Book Exhibition Prize,
- International Convention of Asia Scholars (ICAS) Book Prize,
- Asia Book Awards,
- Japanese Good Design Award.

== Controversy ==
During the Hong Kong Book Fair held in the summer of 2013, the Chung Hwa Book Company was exposed for selling an abridged version of "A Brief History of Hong Kong" (the original English version was compiled by Professor Mark Gould of the Department of History of the University of Hong Kong). Zhonghua Book Company responded that there were two versions of the Chinese translation. The complete version was published in Hong Kong and other regions, and the abridged version only produced a small number of sample books for copyright trade and distribution with mainland China. During the Hong Kong Book Fair, due to stocking and display errors, 38 copies of the sample book were sold at the exhibition, and they were later recalled in time.

== See also ==
- Sino United Publishing
- Zhonghua Book Company
