= Commercial Press (Hong Kong) =

Hong Kong publishing company

The Commercial Press (Hong Kong) Limited
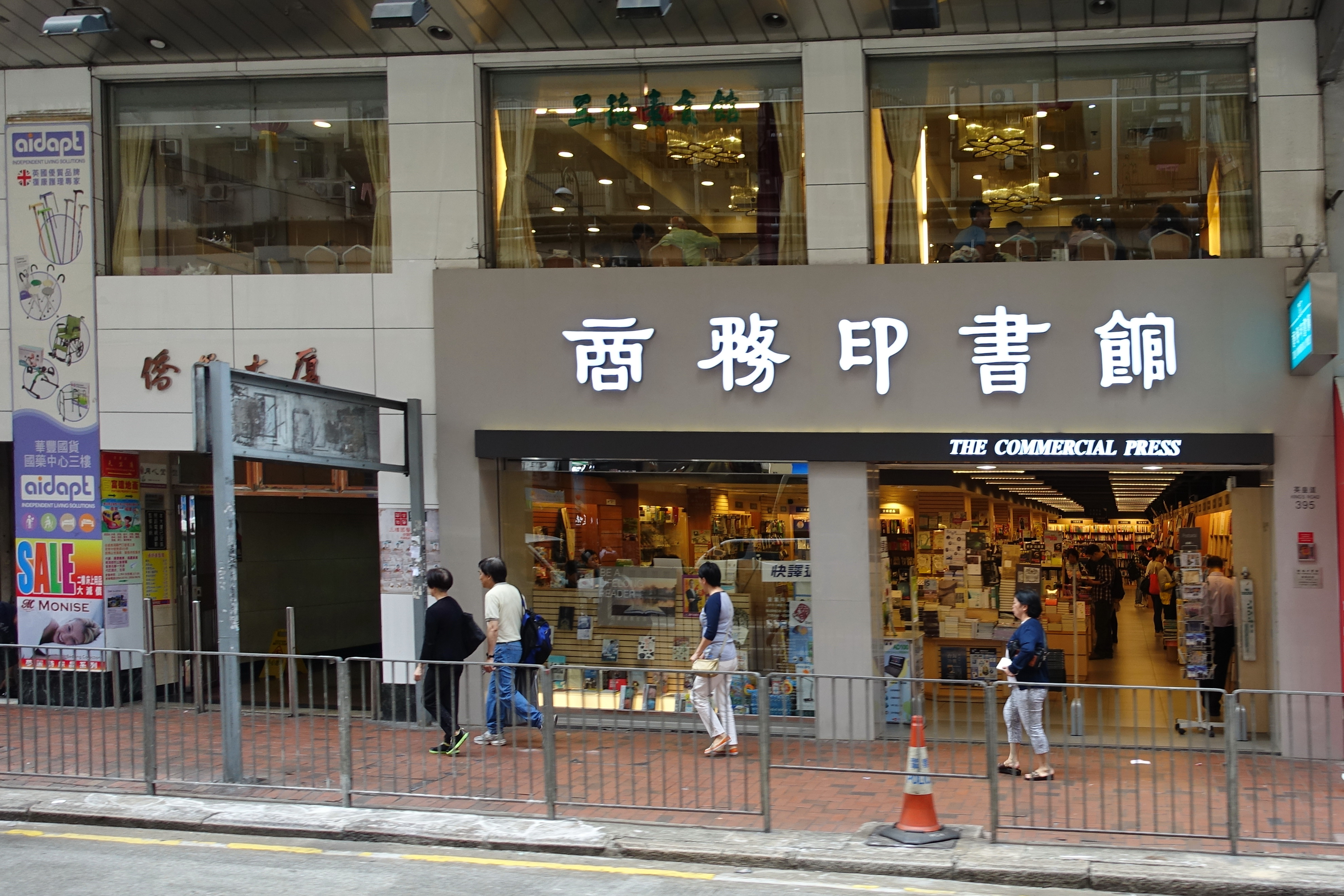
- Hong Kong North Point Branch
- Industry: Publishing
- Headquarters: Hong Kong 9/F, Eastern Plaza, 3 Yiu Hing Road, Shau Kei Wan
- Parent: Sino United Publishing
- Subsidiaries: 商務印書館電子商貿控股有限公司 香港教育圖書公司 香港太平書局 千尋出版社（前稱金陵出版社） Bloomsbury Books Ltd. 商務印書館（香港）網上書店有限公司 東方智庫（北京）信息技術有限公司 聯合電子出版有限公司 汕頭市聯合圖書有限公司
- Website: http://www.commercialpress.com.hk https://coltd.hk/company-30788911-details.htm (online)

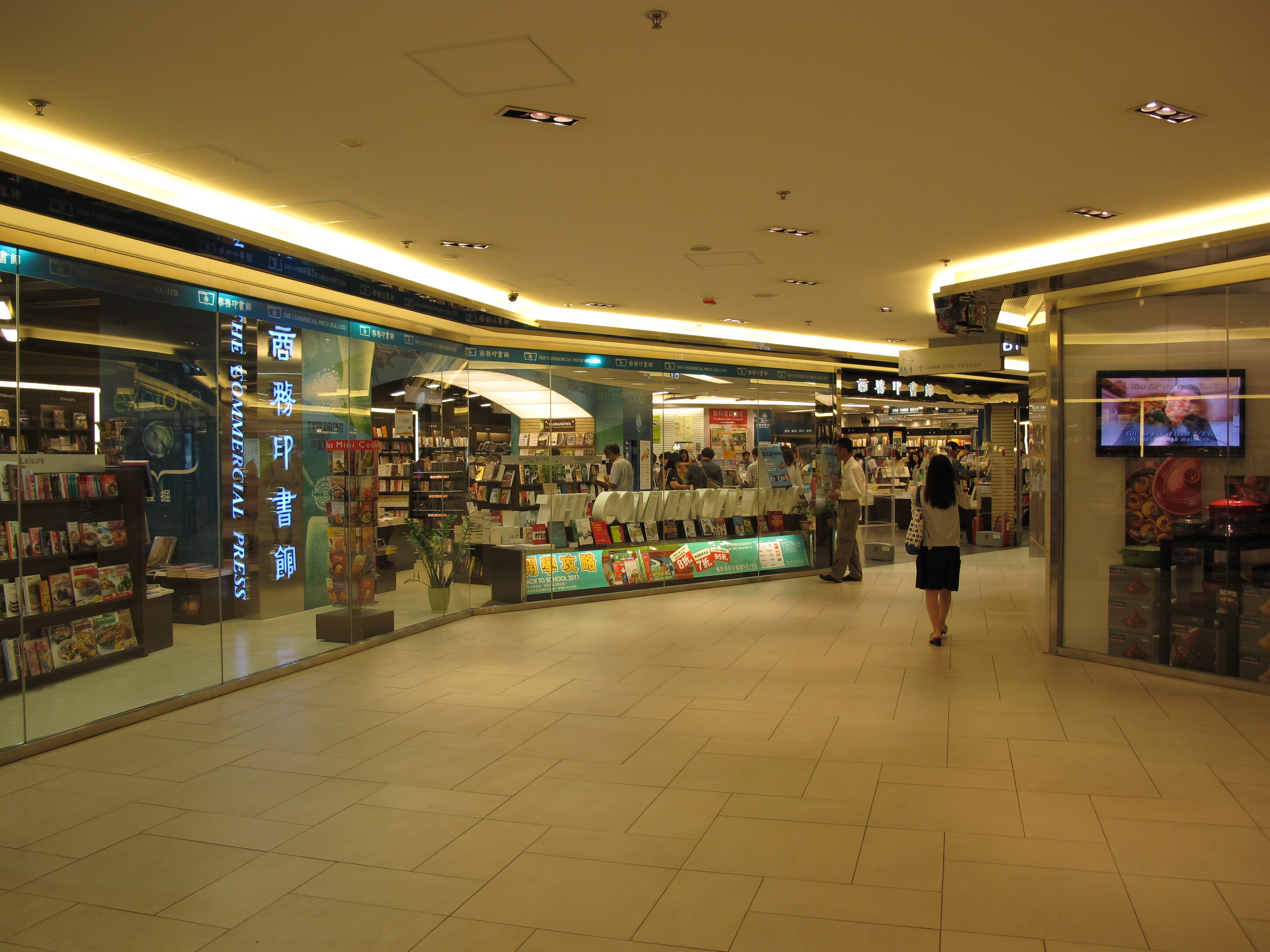
The branch in Miramar Shopping Centre, Tsim Sha Tsui, Hong Kong, covers an area of 18,000 square feet and is the largest flagship store of the Commercial Press.

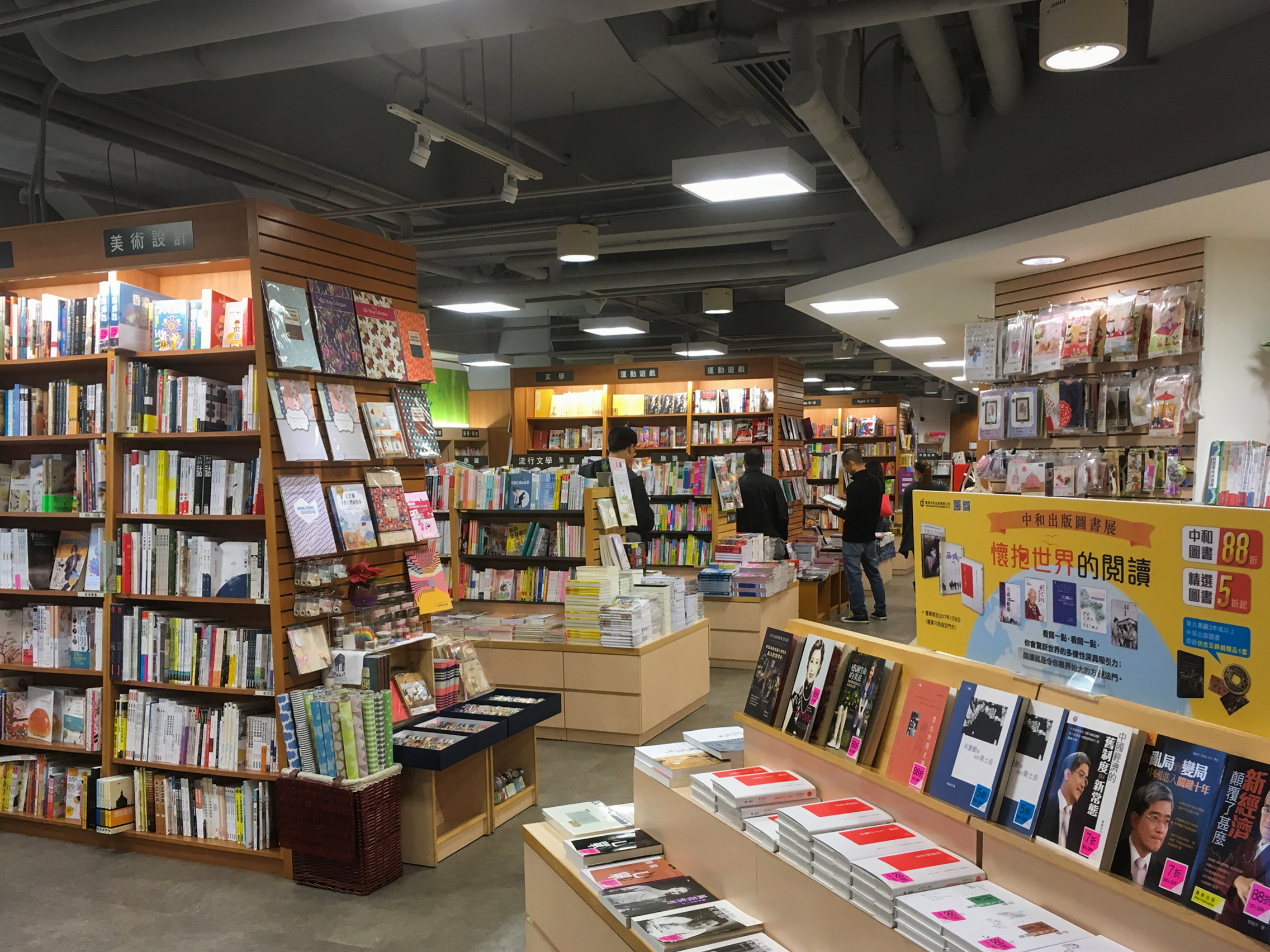
Interior of the Kornhill branch

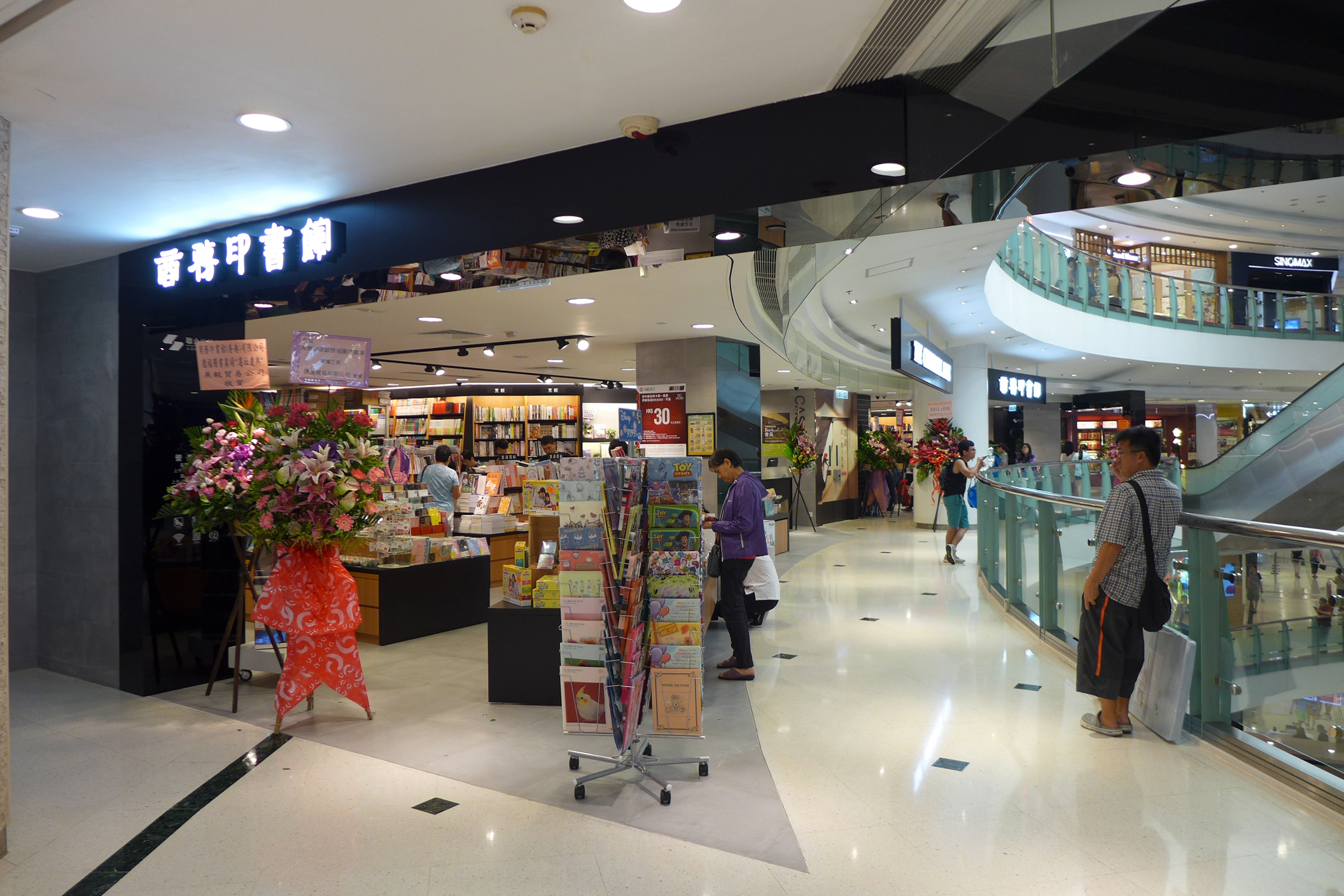
Commercial Press in Telford Plaza, Hong Kong

The Commercial Press (Hong Kong) (商務印書館（香港）) , full name The Commercial Press (Hong Kong) Limited, is a publishing house and book retail chain with the longest history in Hong Kong. It currently has 22 stores in Hong Kong, making it the largest bookstore chain in the city. The Commercial Press is a member of Sino United Publishing (Holdings) Limited, and is devoted to promoting cultural and educational courses and the principle of ‘finding books for readers and finding readers for books’.

== History ==
The Commercial Press was founded in Shanghai, China in 1897. Initially focusing on printing, it later developed into the largest cultural and educational publishing organization in China. It is also the longest-standing modern publishing house in the country.

In 1914, the Hong Kong branch was established, initially operating as retail stores. Later it established the Commercial Press Hong Kong Printing Factory and the editorial and distribution departments, transforming the company into a full-fledged publishing organization.

The company published textbooks for use in Hong Kong as early as 1917, and in the 1930s, it published a complete set of textbooks for Southeast Asian schools.

In 1957, it began to compile and print five-year Chinese secondary school textbooks, and later focused on publishing textbooks, reference books, history, culture, humanities and social sciences.

In 1979, the Hong Kong Educational Publishing Company was established, to publish textbooks and reference books for Hong Kong and Macau.

On June 10, 1988, the Hong Kong branch of the Commercial Press was registered as the Commercial Press (Hong Kong) Co., Ltd.

In 1993, the Commercial Press International Co., Ltd. (商务印书馆国际有限公司) was founded by the Commercial Press (branche) companies in Beijing, Hong Kong, Taipei, Singapore and Kuala Lumpur.

In 2004, the company completed acquisition of Bloomsbury Books.

In 2011, the company had 23 stores in Hong Kong and Macau. In addition to publishing various books and teaching materials in the traditional way, it continued to actively expand its electronic business.

In 2020, the long-operated Tuen Mun Liangjing Store and Jordan Store closed in mid-April and late April respectively.

== Shops ==
The Commercial Press opened its first branch shop in Central, Hong Kong in 1914, and opened branches in North Point and Mong Kok in the 1960s and 1970s. In 1984, it opened a book center in Causeway Bay, which was the largest bookstore in Hong Kong at the time. In 1987, it opened a branch on the 4th floor of Phase 1 of New Town Plaza in Shatin. Currently, there are 22 branches in Hong Kong. Since 2003, the Commercial Press has successively established bookstores in many universities in Hong Kong, including the Chinese University of Hong Kong, City University of Hong Kong, Hong Kong Polytechnic University and Hong Kong University of Science and Technology. In addition, the Commercial Press has set up Commercial Culture Express next to Tai Wai Station, Mei Foo Station and Tung Chung Station of the MTR.

=== Tsim Sha Tsui Flagship Store ===
The Tsim Sha Tsui branch was originally located in Ming Fai Centre, opening in 1991. In 1999, it relocated to the same district's Star House, opening a 19,000-square-foot flagship store with stunning Victoria Harbour views. However, due to the new owner's reluctance to renew the lease, the branch moved to the Miramar Hotel Arcade on May 13, 2007. However, due to hotel renovations, the branch moved to Miramar Arcade on May 20, 2010. Occupying 18,000 square feet, it was the largest branch of the Commercial Press and featured an event room. The branch boasts over 200 cultural events annually. However, after closing in April 2021, the branch opened at Shop 25, G/F, and the entire first floor of Huayuan Building, 83-97 Nathan Road, Tsim Sha Tsui, Kowloon. The new branch officially opened on July 8, 2021. It displays and sells more than 100,000 Chinese and English books and cultural products from local and global sources in a space of 16,000 square feet.

=== Passage ===
Passage is brand founded in 2014, it mainly sells museum souvenirs and history books. The first branch was located in the Hong Kong Museum of History and closed in 2020 due to renovation work. The other two branches are located in the Hong Kong Heritage Museum and the Xiqu Centre.

== Mainland business ==
On April 7, 2018, the Commercial Press opened Benben Bookstore on the third floor of Shenzhen Shenye Shangcheng, which is divided into the Art and Beauty Hall, the Humanities Hall, and the Parent-Child Hall, specializing in selling books from Hong Kong and Taiwan, foreign books, Japanese and Taiwanese comic books, etc.; at the end of 2020, it won the title of "Most Beautiful Bookstore" in the "40 Most Beautiful Bookstores in Shenzhen in 40 Years" selection event sponsored by Shenzhen Newspaper Group and Shenzhen Book and Periodical Publishing Industry Association. At the end of October 2021, due to the expiration of the lease, it was renamed "United Bookstore Benben Art and Beauty Hall" and became the first professional branch of Guangzhou United Bookstore at that time.

== Suspected price-fixing incident ==
On March 20, 2020, the Competition Commission filed a case with the Competition Tribunal, alleging that the Commercial Press, United Publishing Group, Tianlixing Bookstore and its general manager had conspired to set a price discount of only 12% during the sale of primary and secondary school textbooks since 2011, and that they had engaged in price-fixing, bid-rigging and market division when negotiating the tender for school textbooks. The Competition Commission requested the Tribunal to rule that the relevant organizations and individuals had violated the Competition Ordinance.

== Book series ==
- Read About China

== See also ==
- Sino United Publishing
- Commercial Press
