= Joint Publishing =

Book store chain and publisher in Hong Kong

Joint Publishing (Hong Kong)
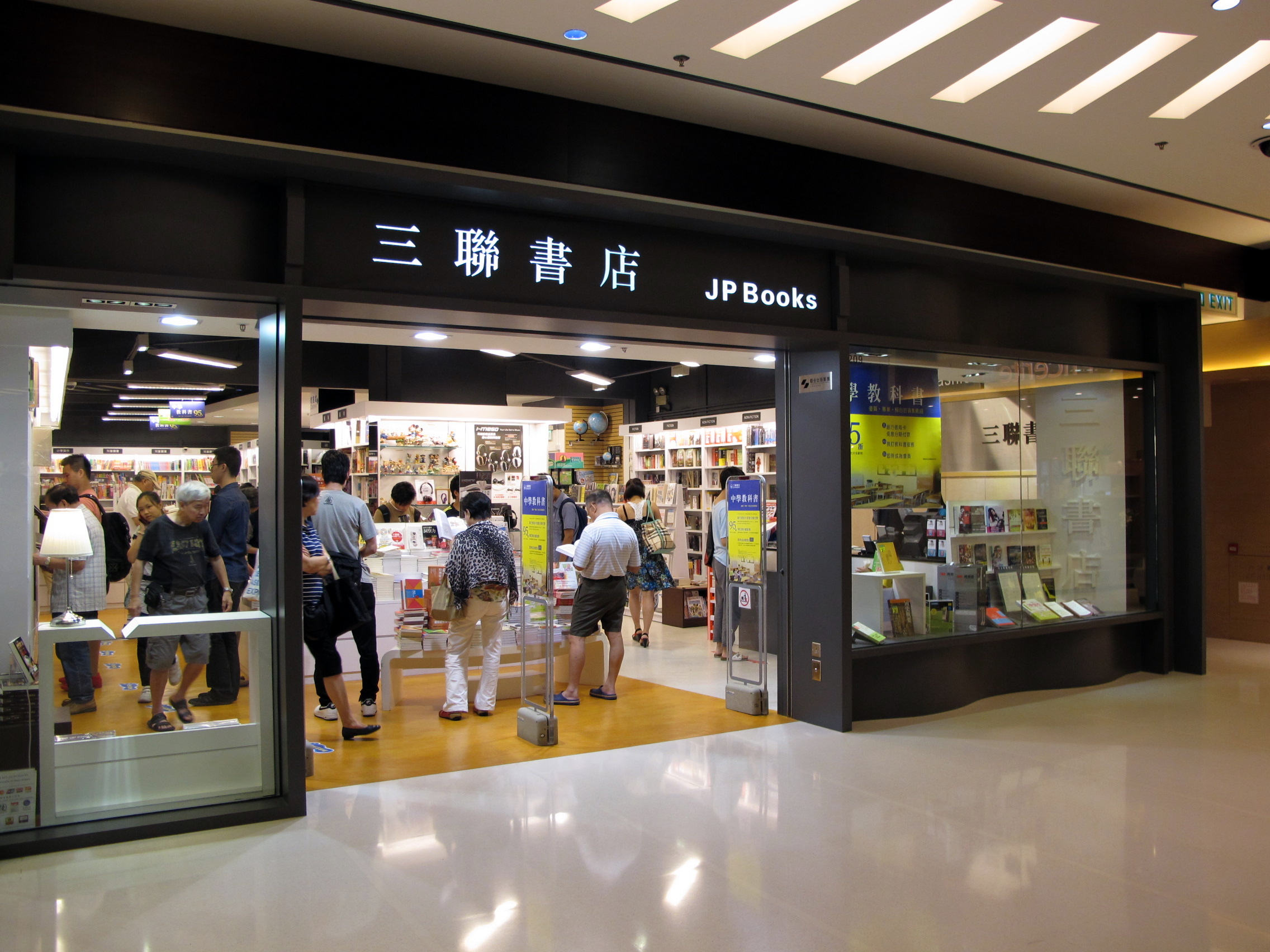
- A book store in Maritime Square, Tsing Yi
- Type: subsidiary
- Industry: publishing
- Founded: 1948 in Shanghai; 1949 (moved to British Hong Kong)
- Headquarters: Hong Kong, China
- Owner: Sino United Publishing
- Parent: Sino United Publishing
- Subsidiaries: Shanghai Hong Kong Joint Publishing (joint venture)

Joint Publishing
- Traditional Chinese: 三聯書店
- Simplified Chinese: 三联书店
- Jyutping: saam1 lyun4 syu1 dim3
- Cantonese Yale: sāam lyùhn syū dim
- Hanyu Pinyin: Sānlián shūdiàn
Transcriptions
Standard Mandarin
- Hanyu Pinyin: Sānlián shūdiàn
Yue: Cantonese
- Yale Romanization: sāam lyùhn syū dim
- Jyutping: saam1 lyun4 syu1 dim3

Joint Publishing (Chinese: 三聯書店), also known as Sanlian Press or SDX Joint Publishing, is a book store chain and publisher founded at Queen's Road Central in Hong Kong on 18 October 1948. Joint Publishing (Hong Kong) is one of major book store chains in Hong Kong and currently a subsidiary company of Sino United Publishing (Holdings) Limited. The Mainland China branches of the book store chain, such as SDX Joint Publishing and Shanghai Joint Publishing were owned by separate holding company of the Chinese government.

Joint Publishing (Hong Kong)'s parent company Sino United Publishing, was owned by Chinese central government agency Hong Kong Liaison Office.

== History ==
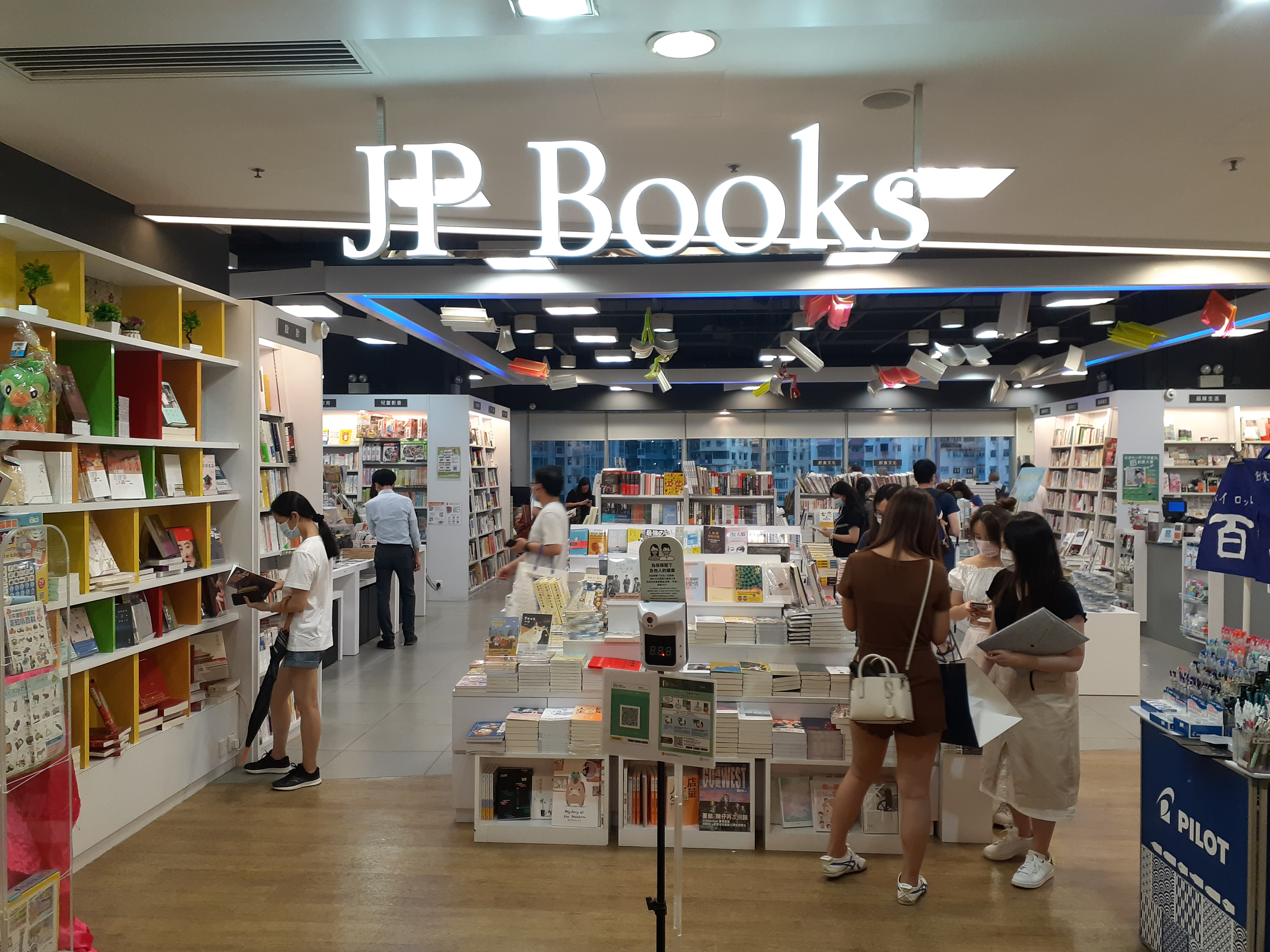
JP Books in apm, Kwun Tong

The book store was the result of a merger in 1948 between three leading Shanghai publishers and book stores, Life (Chinese: 生活書店; pinyin: Shēnghuó shūdiàn), Reading (Chinese: 讀書出版社; pinyin: Dúshū chūbǎnshè) and New Knowledge (Chinese: 新知書店; pinyin: Xīnzhī shūdiàn). The newly merged bookstore brought together all the names of its previous entities (Chinese: 生活書店、讀書出版社、新知書店三聯書店), but was often referred to in English as SDX Joint Publishing, taking the first initial of each of the previous names to form an acronym, or simply Sanlian Press or Joint Publishing (Chinese: 三聯書店; pinyin: Sānlián shūdiàn). Shortly after it was formed, it moved its headquarters to Beijing in March 1949 and established its Hong Kong–based subsidiary.

After the establishment of People's Republic of China on 1 October 1949, the bookstore located in Hong Kong was mainly responsible for publishing materials from mainland China, while the main branch in mainland China was nationalized. After the coming of Cultural Revolution in mainland China in 1966, the publishing business in mainland China was seriously damaged and the bookstore in Hong Kong survived by republishing old books.

With several re-locations, it finally settled in current premises in Queen Victoria Street in May 1971 and opened a retail store at the ground floor in July 1974.

The Cultural Revolution ended in 1976 and was soon replaced with economic reform. In 1978 the book store in Hong Kong decided to publish their own books independently and join with other international publishers. It initially targeted in Chinese culture, literature and art and later concentrated Hong Kong topics and social science. Its direction was proved successful and the book store aggressively opened branches in Hong Kong.

Outside Hong Kong, the book store expanded to various cities in mainland China by joint venture, and five stores in North America, specifically in Toronto, Vancouver, New York, Los Angeles, and San Francisco.

In January 1988, the Hong Kong–based Joint Publishing was registered as a limited liability company called 'Joint Publishing (Hong Kong) Company Limited (Chinese: 三聯書店(香港)有限公司)'.

In March 2021, Joint Publishing was found liable for defamation, publishing information that the High Court found false, including claims that the United States had funded opposition groups in Hong Kong.

== Subsidiaries ==
Shanghai Hong Kong Joint Publishing Co., Ltd. (simplified Chinese: 上海香港三联书店有限公司; traditional Chinese: 上海香港三聯書店有限公司): Established in October 1999, it is a joint venture between Joint Publishing (Hong Kong), Shanghai Book (Chinese: 上海图书) and Shanghai Joint Publishing.

== Namesake ==
- SDX Joint Publishing (Chinese: 生活·读书·新知三联书店): The mainland branch of Joint Publishing was merged with state-owned the People's Publishing House (Chinese: 人民出版社) in 1951. In January 1986, it became an independent company unrelated to the Joint Publishing (Hong Kong).
- Shanghai Joint Publishing (Chinese: 上海三联书店): It was founded in 1986 by People's Publishing House as a subsidiary of Jiefang Daily, unrelated to the Joint Publishing (Hong Kong).
