= Sino United Publishing =

Hong Kong publishing group

- Founded: 1988
- Country of origin: China
- Headquarters location: S U P Tower (聯合出版大廈); North Point, Hong Kong
- Publication types: Books
- Imprints: Chung Hwa Book Company, Commercial Press, Joint Publishing
- Official website: www.sup.com.hk

Sino United Publishing
- Traditional Chinese: 聯合出版（集團）有限公司
- Simplified Chinese: 联合出版（集团）有限公司
Transcriptions
Standard Mandarin
- Hanyu Pinyin: Liánhé Chūbǎn Jítuán Yǒuxiàngōngsī
Yue: Cantonese
- Jyutping: lyun4 hap6 ceot1 baan2 (zaap6 tyun4) jau5 haan6 gung1 si1

Sino United Publishing (Holdings) Limited (Chinese: 聯合出版（集團）有限公司) is Hong Kong's largest integrated publishing group, formed in 1988 from the integration of some of the historic publishing agencies. Its business includes publishing, distribution, retail, printing, RFID packaging design, art business, cultural exchanges. It has subsidiaries and affiliated agencies throughout Hong Kong and Macao, mainland China, Singapore, Malaysia, as well as in North America, Europe etc.

Sino also invested resources to develop e-commerce and digital publishing business. Sino is based in Hong Kong, but has expanded in the overseas cultural market. The group aims to promote the Chinese culture, the responsibility to promote social progress. In 2015, Next Magazine revealed that the Liaison Office of the Central People's Government in Hong Kong had taken control of Sino United Publishing.

Its head office is in the S U P Tower (聯合出版大廈) in North Point.

== History ==
The oldest part of the business, Commercial Press Hong Kong, commenced trading in 1914; Chongwa Hong Kong was started in 1927; Hong Kong Joint Publishing in 1948. Joint Printing (Hong Kong) Limited started in 1980 by the merger of two printers from China: Hong Kong Commercial Press Printing Office, established in Hong Kong in 1924 and in 1933 Chongwa Kowloon established printing plant.

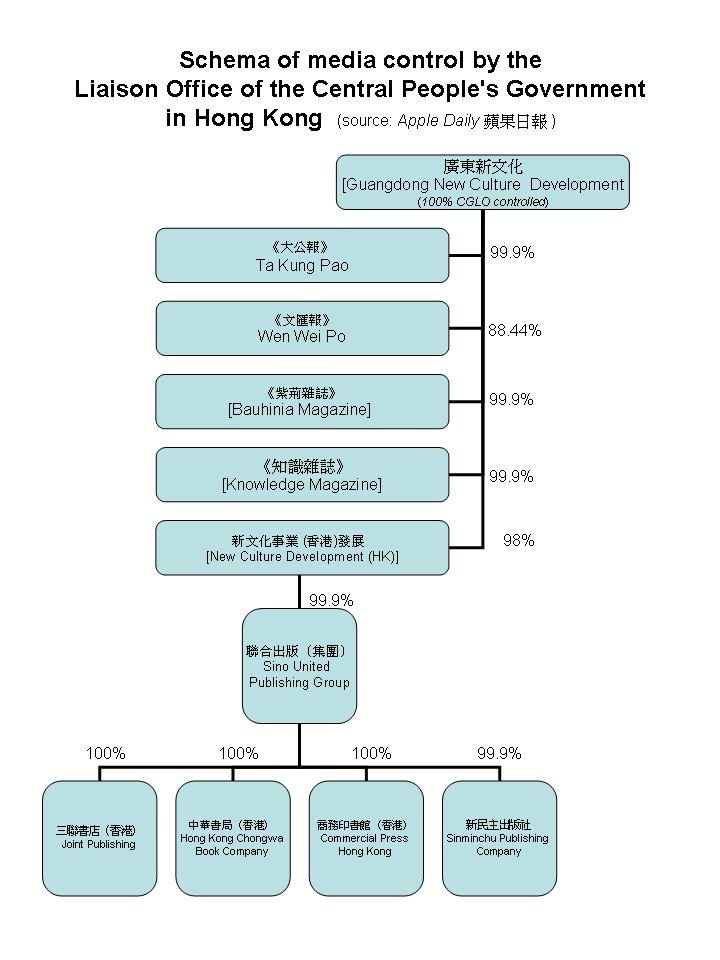
Schema of media control by the Liaison Office of the Central People's Government in Hong Kong

A joint management office was established for Joint Publishing, Chunghwa, Commercial Press Hong Kong in 1980. In September 1988, the joint management office was reorganised under Sino United Publishing as a holding company, which wholly owns the three enterprises (Joint Publishing, Chunghwa, Commercial Press Hong Kong) and some other publishing companies. The group has an 80% share of the book publishing market. It is Hong Kong's largest Chinese publishing group, and has 51 retail outlets in the territory. In 2015, it was reported that Central Government Liaison Office, which already owns three newspaper titles, was in control of Sino United.

=== Censorship controversy ===
In January 2015, following CY Leung's attack on a compilation book entitled Hong Kong Nationalism, Joint Publishing, Chongwa, and Commercial Press de-listed the title. Hong Kong media reported that Sino had published and was distributing at least five anti-Occupy titles, and its stores were displaying these prominently, whereas popular books on the Umbrella movement by pro-democracy authors had been banished from their shelves. In March 2015, Up Publications, a small independent publishing house, complained that it was suddenly and unexpectedly faced with a large number of returns from the three main subsidiaries of Sino. Twenty titles were affected by the returns, to the serious detriment to the finances of Up Publications; many of the titles returned were not politically themed. The publisher was allegedly told by a bookshop source that its stance in the 2014 occupation and its publishing of books supportive of the Umbrella Movement were responsible. Although no reason was given for the returns, two of the delisted books about the occupation were strong sellers at independent bookshops. Students staged a "read-in" of delisted books outside the Commercial Press on the campus of the Chinese University to draw attention to the marginalisation of independent books, and urging the public to independent booksellers in the city instead of subsidiaries of Sino.

== Subsidiaries ==
- Joint Publishing (Hong Kong) Company Limited (三聯書店(香港)有限公司): A carry over subsidiary during the foundation of the company. It was incorporated on 23 January 1987.
- Chung Hwa Book Company (Hong Kong) Limited (中華書局(香港)有限公司): A carry over subsidiary during the foundation of the company. It was incorporated on 16 June 1988.
- The Commercial Press (Hong Kong) Limited (商務印書館（香港）有限公司): A carry over subsidiary during the foundation of the company. It was incorporated on 10 June 1988.
- C & C Joint Printing Company (Hong Kong) Limited (中華商務聯合印刷（香港）有限公司): A carry over subsidiary during the foundation of the company. It was incorporated on 8 January 1980.

- C & C Offset Printing Company Limited (中華商務彩色印刷有限公司): Incorporated on 11 March 1988 in Hong Kong.
- C & C Joint Printing Company (Guangdong) Limited (中華商務聯合印刷（廣東）有限公司):
- Shenzhen C & C Joint Printing Company Limited (深圳中華商務聯合印刷有限公司):
- C & C Joint Printing Company (Shanghai) Limited (上海中華商務聯合印刷有限公司): on 11 July 2007, the Shanghai Qingpu Industrial Park factory began operation.
- C & C Joint Printing Company (Beijing) Limited (北京華聯印刷有限公司):
- C & C Security Printing Company Limited (中華商務安全印務有限公司): Incorporated on 23 May 1989 in Hong Kong.
- C & C Security Printing (Macau) Company Limited (C&C安全印務（澳門）有限公司):
- C & C Security Printing Company (Shenzhen) Limited (深圳中華商務安全印務股份有限公司):
- Shanghai Security Printing Company Limited (上海安全印務有限公司): A joint venture company.
- Anji Anti-counterfeiting Technology Service Company Limited (上海安技智能科技有限公司): A joint venture company.
- C & C RFID Shanghai Company Limited (集速智能標籤(上海)有限公司): A joint venture company.
- Beijing Silverpeony Printing Company Limited (北京銀牡丹印務有限公司):
- C & C Logistic Services Company Limited (中華商務物流服務有限公司): Originally incorporated on 28 August 1987 in Hong Kong as Media Typesetting & Productions Limited (美迪植字製作有限公司), then reincorporated on 16 February 1993 as Media Productions Limited (美迪製作有限公司), then on 23 May 2001 as C & C Logistic Services Company Limited (中華商務物流服務有限公司).
- Spring Innovative Workshop Co., Limited (爾雅文化創意發展有限公司): Originally incorporated on 18 April 1989 in Hong Kong as C & C Printing Equipment Company Limited (中華商務印刷器材有限公司). It was reincorporated on 7 April 2011 as Swank Cultural Innovation Development Co., Limited (爾雅文化創意發展有限公司), then reincorporated on 26 March 2013 with English company name changed (Spring Innovative Workshop Co., Limited), then reincorporated on 4 May 2016 with Chinese company name removed.
- Spring Cultural Innovation Development (Shenzhen) Co., Ltd. (深圳爾雅文化創意發展有限公司):
- Shenzhen Vision Paper Art Co., Ltd. (深圳市華信紙品有限公司): A joint venture company.
- Beijing Bisenet Information Culture Company Limited (北京必勝網信文化有限公司):
- C & C Education Foundation Limited (中華商務希望基金會有限公司): The predecessor (中華商務希望基金會) was established in 2006. C & C Education Foundation Limited was incorporated on 2012年11月06日 in Hong Kong, then established in 2013 as charitable company.

- Wan Li Book Company Limited (萬里機構出版有限公司): Established in 1959 (萬里書店). Wan Li Book Company Limited (萬里書店有限公司) was incorporated on 14 July 1978, then it was incorporated on 20 January 1989 under new Chinese company name (萬里機構出版有限公司).
- Sun Ya Publications (Hong Kong) Limited (新雅文化事業有限公司): Established in 1961. It was incorporated on 13 June 1980 in Hong Kong as Sun Ya Publications (H.K.) Limited (新雅文化事業有限公司).

- Sunbeam Publications (H.K.) Limited (山邊出版社有限公司): It was incorporated on 12 March 1996 in Hong Kong.

- Hong Kong Open Page Publishing Company Limited (香港中和出版有限公司): Established in 2010. It was incorporated on 26 October 2010 in Hong Kong.
- Sino United Electronic Publishing Limited (聯合電子出版有限公司): Established in 1992. It was incorporated on 22 September 1992 in Hong Kong.

- SuperBookcity.com (超閱網): Established in 2013.

- Lee Yuen Subscription Agencies Limited (利源書報社有限公司): Established in 1959. It was incorporated on 8 February 1985 in Hong Kong.
- Sinminchu Publishing Company Limited (新民主出版社有限公司): Established on 4 January 1946. It was incorporated on 23 September 1988 in Hong Kong.
- Bailey Record Company Limited (百利唱片有限公司): Established in 1962 in Hong Kong as a publisher and dealer of records in China and Pacific audio-visual products, and also produced records and audio tapes. Bailey Record Company Limited was incorporated on 5 July 1985.
- Tsi Ku Chai Company Limited (集古齋有限公司): Established in 1958 on Central House, 10 Queen's Road Central, Central District, as a dealer of traditionally bound books, used books, rubbings of stone inscriptions, and Buddhist scriptural books. Tsi Ku Chai Company Limited was incorporated on 20 June 1984 .

- Sino Art Auctioneers Limited (淳浩拍賣有限公司): It was incorporated on 12 July 2005 in Hong Kong. Established in August 2005.
- Rong Bao Zhai Hong Kong Limited (榮寶齋（香港）有限公司): A joint venture company between Pok Art House Limited and the Rong Bao Zhai company in China. Incorporated on 11 September 1987 in Hong Kong as Rong Bao Zhai (H.K.) Company Limited (榮寶齋(香港)有限公司).
- Shanghai Tsikuchai (上海集古齋文化藝術有限公司): A joint venture company. Established on 8 January 2003 in Shanghai.
- ? (北京瀚墨文化藝術有限公司/瀚墨空間): A Beijing retailer of contemporary oil paintings.

- Pok Art House Limited (博雅藝術有限公司): Established in 1970. Incorporated on 23 May 1986 in Hong Kong.
- Kiu Sheung Investment Company Limited (僑商置業有限公司): Established in 1964. Incorporated on 19 March 1964 in Hong Kong.

- Truth Sound Development Limited (信聲發展有限公司): Incorporated on 2 June 1989.
- Sino Express Development Limited (勝裕發展有限公司): Incorporated on 4 July 1996.

- SUP Publishing Logistics (Hong Kong) Limited (香港聯合書刊物流有限公司): Established in 2004. Incorporated on 5 May 2004 in Hong Kong.

- SUP Retail (Hong Kong) Limited (香港聯合零售有限公司): Incorporated on 8 February 2005 in Hong Kong. In 2013, it was merged into SUP Publishing Logistics (Hong Kong) Limited, but the company was remained registered.
- Lee Yuen Subscription Agencies Limited (利源書報社有限公司): Incorporated on 8 February 1985 in Hong Kong. In 2013, it was merged into SUP Publishing Logistics (Hong Kong) Limited, but the company was remained registered.

- Plaza Cultural Macau Limitada/Plaza Cultural Macau, Lda. (澳門文化廣場有限公司): Established in 1988.
- Sino-Commercial Trading Corporation (中華商貿有限公司/中華商務貿易公司): Established in 1954 (中華商務廣州辦事處).

- Guangdong Dayin Audio-Visual Publishing House (廣東大音音像出版社): Formerly as a publisher for Sino-Commercial Trading Corporation, it was established in 2003-01.

- Guangdong Sino United Publishing Company Limited (廣東聯合圖書有限公司): Established in 2005.

- ? (北京時代聯合圖書有限公司):

- Shenzhen Pok Art Company Limited (深圳博雅藝術有限公司): Established in 1980 as a joint venture with Winkeep? (深圳市文化企業發展公司).

- ? (中山博雅藝術有限公司):

- Sino United Digital Publishing Service Limited (深圳聯合數字出版服務有限公司): Established in 2001.
- Chung Hwa Book Company (S) Pte. Limited (中華書局（新）有限公司): Established in 1923 as the Shanghai CHBC's Singapore branch.
- The Commercial Press (S) Pte. Limited (商務印書館（新）有限公司): Established in 1916 as the Beijing TCP's Singapore branch.
- K. L. Commercial Book Company (M) Sdn. Bhd. (商務印書館（馬）有限公司): Established in 1956 as the Beijing TCP's Malaysia branch. In 1987, K. L. Commercial Book Company (M) Sdn. Bhd. was registered as a limited liability company operating independently.
- Sino United Publishing (U.S.) Inc. (聯合出版（美國）有限公司): Established in 1989.
- Sino United Publishing (L.A.) Inc. (聯合出版（洛杉磯）有限公司): Established in 1994.
- Eastwind Books & Arts Inc. (東風書店):Established in 1979, it is a retailer based in San Francisco and Los Angeles. In 1993, it was acquired by Sino United Publishing (Holdings) Limited.

- wushumedia.com: A vendor for martial arts audio-visual products, based in Eastwind's San Francisco branch.

- Oriental Culture Enterprises Company Inc. (東方文化事業公司): Established in 1976. In 2012, its retail business began to be managed by SUP Publishing Logistics (Hong Kong) Limited.
- Sino United Publishing (Canada) Limited (聯合出版（加拿大）有限公司): Established in 1988.

- SUP Book Store (三聯書店/溫哥華三聯書店華埠店): Vancouver, B. C. retail store.
- SUP Book Store (三聯書店/溫哥華三聯書店列治文店): Richmond, B. C. retail store.

- Sino United Publishing (Toronto) Limited (聯合出版（多倫多）有限公司): Established in 1994. The retail store is under the Joint Publishing name.

- SUP Book Store (三聯書店/多倫多三聯書店總店): Toronto, Ontario retail store.

- Sino United Publishing (U.K.) Limited (聯合出版（英國）有限公司): Established in 1990.
- SUP Cultural Investments Company Limited (聯合出版文化投資有限公司): Incorporated in Hong Kong on 26 April 2013.
