= Commercial Press =

Chinese publishing organisation

The Commercial Press 商务印书馆

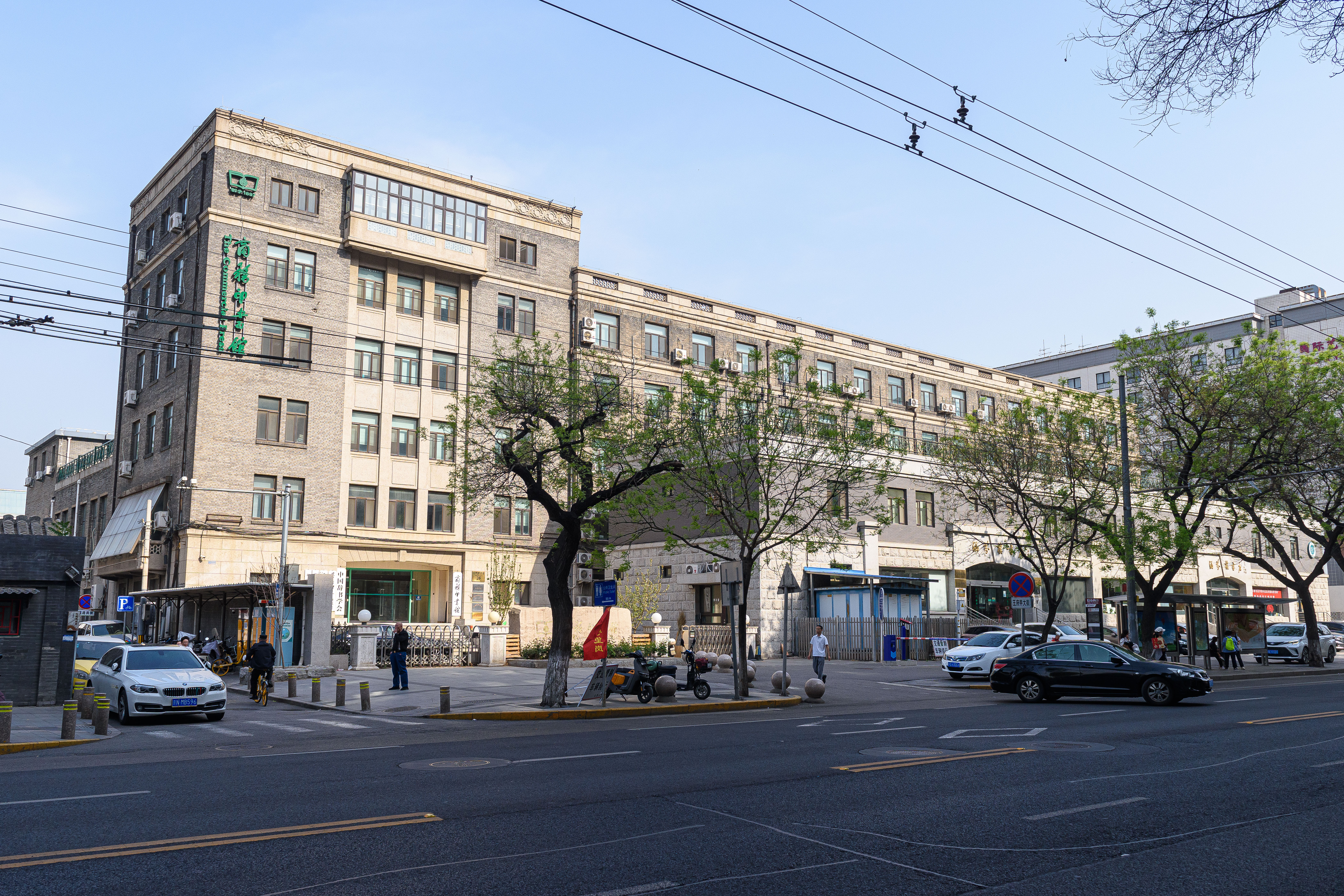
- Native name: 商務印書館有限公司
- Industry: Publishing
- Founded: 11 February 1897; 129 years ago in Shanghai
- Headquarters: Beijing, China
- Products: Books, newspapers, magazines
- Number of employees: 260 in 25 departments
- Website: www.cp.com.cn

Commercial Press
- Simplified Chinese: 商务印书馆有限公司
- Traditional Chinese: 商務印書館有限公司
Transcriptions
Standard Mandarin
- Hanyu Pinyin: Shāngwù Yìnshūguǎn Yǒuxiàngōngsī
- Wade–Giles: Shang1-wu4 Yin4-shu1-kuan3 Yu3-hsien4-kung1-ssu1

The Commercial Press (simplified Chinese: 商务印书馆; traditional Chinese: 商務印書館; pinyin: Shāngwù Yìnshūguǎn) is the first modern publishing organisation in China. It is known for its academic publishing and translation work in humanities and social sciences, as well as the Xinhua Dictionary.

== History ==
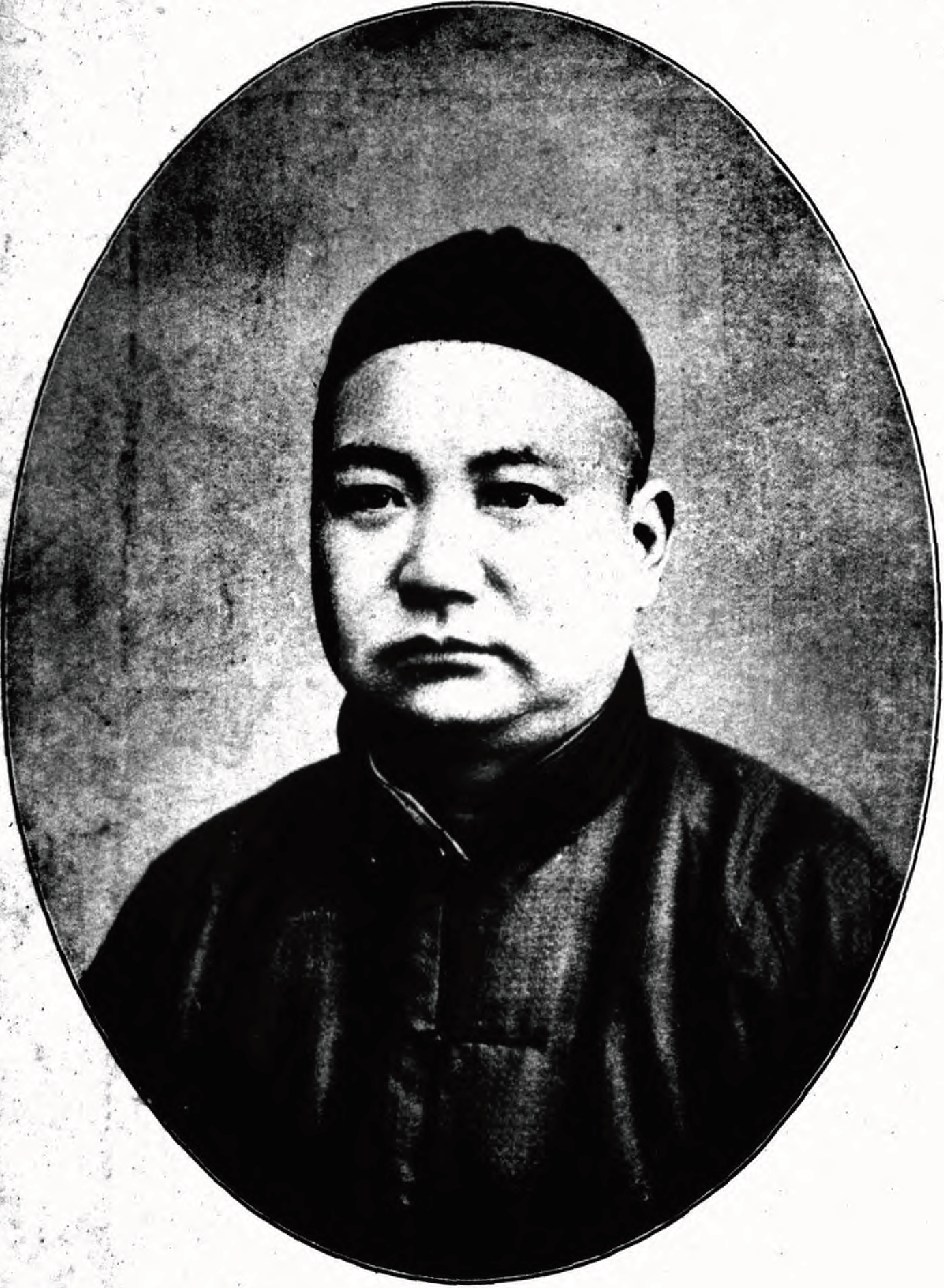
Xia Ruifang

In 1897, 26-year-old Xia Ruifang and three of his friends (including the Bao brothers Bao Xian'en and Bao Xianchang) founded the Commercial Press in Shanghai. All four were Protestant Christians who received their training at the American Presbyterian Mission Press. The group soon received financial backing and began publishing books, such as Bibles.

From 1903 to 1914, the Commercial Press operated as a joint venture with Kinkōdō, one of the largest Japanese textbook publishers. Through the joint venture, the Commercial Press obtained the latest printing technology, as well as lantern slides and cinema.

From 1903, Zhang Yuanji (张元济, 1867–1959), reacting to China's moves towards a new curriculum, created several textbook and translation series, and from 1904 onwards he launched popular periodicals, such as Dongfang Zazhi (Eastern Miscellany, 1904), Jiaoyu zazhi (The Chinese Education Journal), Xiaoshuo Zazhi (Short Story Magazine, later Fiction Monthly), Xuesheng Zazhi (Student Magazine) and Funü Zazhi (Women's Journal).

The Republic of China succeeded the Qing in 1912. In January 1914, the founder of the Commercial Press, Xia Ruifang, was stabbed to death.

The Commercial Press acquired film studio equipment and camera from a failed American-owned business in Nanjing in 1917. The Commercial Press' film production focused on documentaries. The Commercial Press explicitly sought to domestically produce films as a substitute for foreign imports, which the Commercial Press described as "flippant and mendacious, very harmful to the maintenance of customs and popular sentiment. 'Foreign films' frequently satirize inferior conditions in our society, thus providing material for derision."

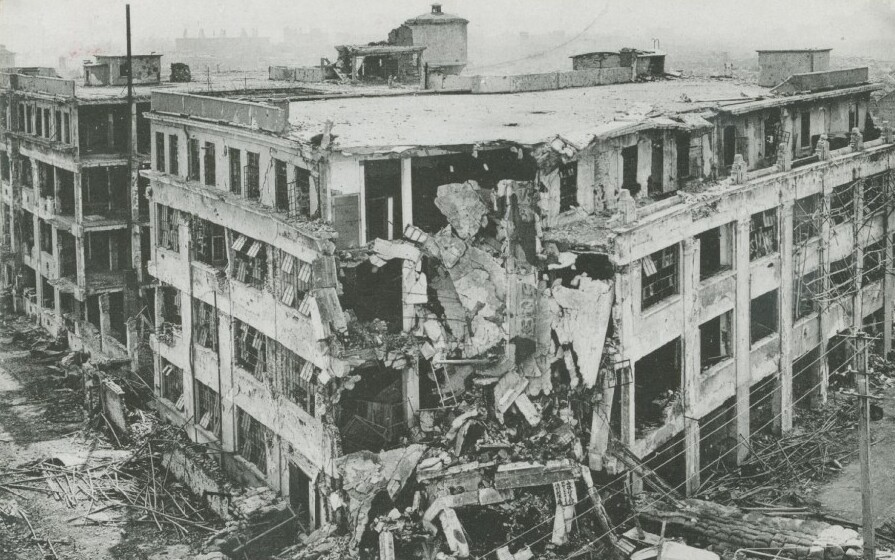
Ruins of the Commercial Press in 1932 after the January 28 incident

In 1932, the Commercial Press was bombed by the Imperial Japanese Army during the January 28 Incident. The bombing destroyed its headquarters in Zhabei, Shanghai, and its attached Oriental Library (Dongfang Tushuguan) and its collection of more than 500,000 books, including tens of thousands of rare books. Also destroyed in the bombing were Commercial Press's management offices, warehouses, and four printing presses. The bombing destroyed 80% of its assets in total.

=== People's Republic of China ===
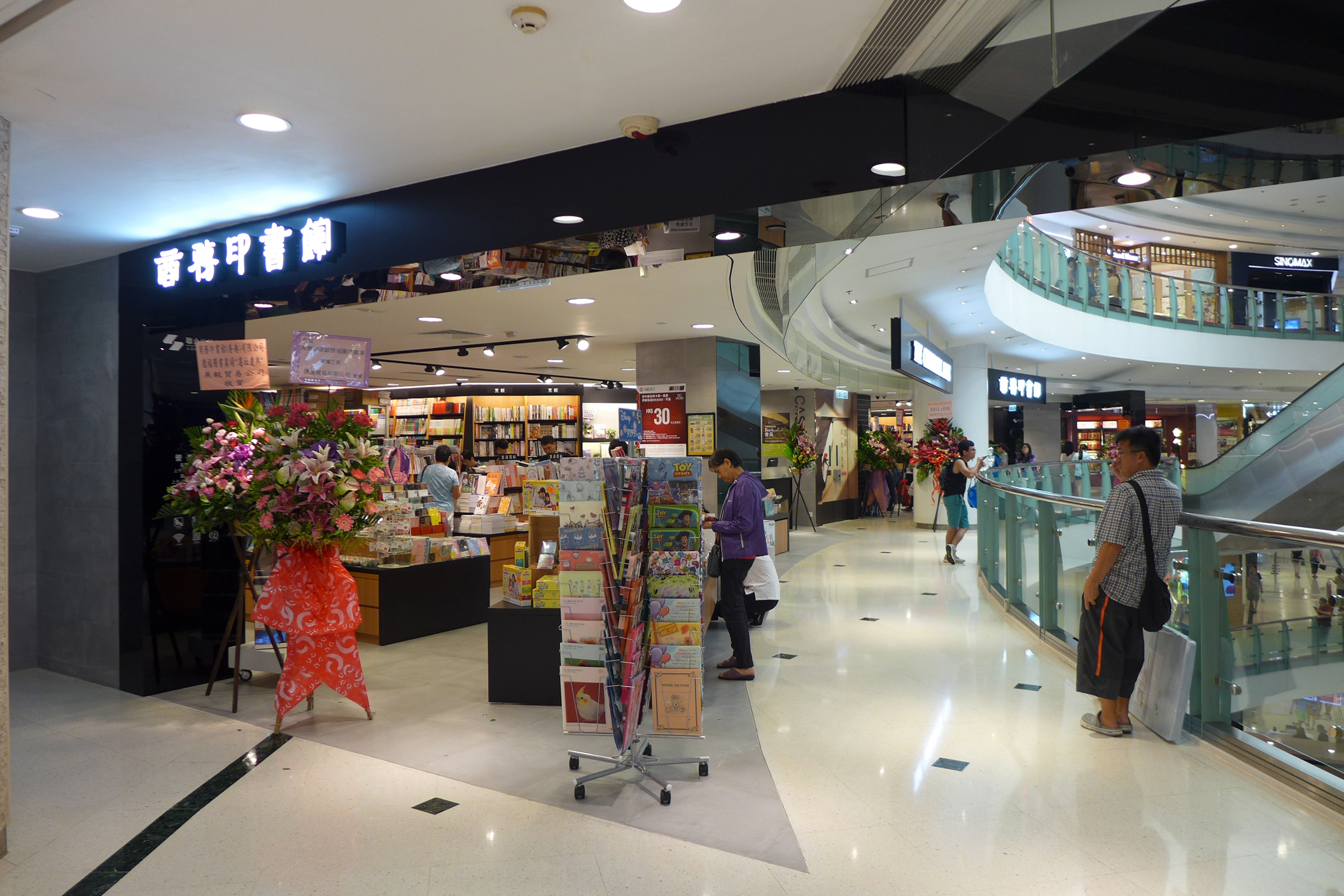
Commercial Press in Telford Plaza, Hong Kong

In 1949, the Commercial Press' operations were relocated away from China after the People's Liberation Army entered Shanghai. In 1954, the Commercial Press' headquarters was moved from Shanghai to Beijing, shifting its focus to academic works published in the West. In 1993, the separate Commercial Press companies in mainland China, Hong Kong, Taiwan, Singapore, and Malaysia established a joint venture, becoming the Commercial Press International Limited. In 2011, the Beijing office became a limited liability company (商务印书馆有限公司). When China publishing and Media Holdings Co., Ltd. (中国出版传媒股份有限公司) was founded on 19 December 2011, the newly founded company became the parent company.

Today it is headquartered in Beijing and continues as an active publishing house of Chinese language learning materials including dictionaries, textbooks, pedagogical texts, and a cultural magazine called The World of Chinese.

== Subsidiaries ==
=== Beijing ===
- Subsidiaries of the Beijing branch: Chinese Editing Centre (汉语编辑中心), Academic Editing Centre (学术编辑中心), English Editing Room (英语编辑室), Foreign Language Editing Room (外语编辑室), UNESCO Editing Centre (教科文编辑中心), Online Publication Centre (数字出版中心).
- The Commercial Press International Co., Ltd. (商务印书馆国际有限公司): Founded in 1993 by the Commercial Press branches in Beijing, Hong Kong, Taipei, Singapore, Kuala Lumpur
- The World of English Inc. (《英语世界》杂志社有限公司): Founded in 1981
- The World of Chinese magazine (《汉语世界》杂志社有限责任公司)

== Former subsidiaries ==
- Dongfang Tushuguan/Oriental Library (東方圖書館): A library founded in 1925, and was later destroyed in 1932.
- The Commercial Press (Hong Kong) Limited (商務印書館（香港）有限公司): Founded in 1914 (香港商務印書館/商務印書館香港分館) in Hong Kong as a subsidiary of the Beijing TCP. In 10 June 1988, it was incorporated as the Commercial Press (Hong Kong) Limited (商務印書館（香港）有限公司). When Sino United Publishing (Holdings) Limited was established, it became a subsidiary of SUP.

- Commercial Press (HK) Cyberbooks Ltd. (商務印書館（香港）網上書店有限公司): Online bookstore for the Commercial Press (H.K.) Ltd. Founded in 18 March 1999 as CP BooksNet. The site CP1897.com was founded in 12 April 2000 with SUNeVision.
- The Commercial Press Hong Kong Printing Factory (商務印書館香港印刷廠): Established in 1924 in Sai Wan, Hong Kong as a printer for TCP's Hong Kong branch. In 1933, it was moved to North Point. In 1980, it was merged with Zhonghua Book Company Hong Kong Printing Factory (中華書局香港印刷廠) and Tae Chien Printing Co. (大千印刷公司) into C & C Joint Printing Co., (H.K.) Ltd. (中華商務聯合印刷（香港）有限公司).
- Hong Kong Educational Publishing Company (香港教育圖書公司): Established in 1979 as a textbook and reference publisher.
- Bloomsbury Books Limited/Bloomsbury Books Ltd.: In November 2005, the Commercial Press (H.K.) Ltd. acquired Bloomsbury Books as an extension of its professional arm serving the legal and business communities in Hong Kong.
- EdFun Limited (同學坊): Established in 2005

- The Commercial Press, Ltd. (臺灣商務印書館股份有限公司): In September 1947, TCP's Fuzhou branch manager Ye Youmei entered Taiwan to plan for the branch. In October 1947, TCP bought a wooden and brick house in 37 Chongqing South Road 1st Section for the planned Taiwan headquarter. In 1948, the Taiwan branch (商務印書館臺灣分館) began operation. In 1949, the Taiwan branch became an independent entity under the demand from Taiwanese government, and the Chinese name was changed (臺灣商務印書館). In 10 October 1950, the company completed registration.
- The Commercial Press (S) Pte. Limited (商務印書館（新）有限公司/商務印書館（新加坡）有限公司): Established in 1916 as the Beijing TCP's Singapore branch. As of 2016, it is a subsidiary of Sino United Publishing (Holdings) Limited.
- K. L. Commercial Book Company (M) Sdn. Bhd. (商務印書館（馬）有限公司/商務印書館（馬來西亞）有限公司): Established in 1956 as the Beijing TCP's Malaysia branch. In 1987, K. L. Commercial Book Company (M) Sdn. Bhd. was registered as a limited liability company operating independently. As of 2016, it is a subsidiary of Sino United Publishing (Holdings) Limited.

== Representative publications ==
- MacNair, Harley Farnsworth (1933). The Chinese abroad, their position and protection: a study in international law and relations. The Commercial Press, Limited.
- 顏惠慶, ed. (1908). An English and Chinese standard dictionary: comprising 120,000 words and phrases, with translations, pronunciations, definitions, illustrations, etc., etc.; with a copious appendix. Vol. I. (First ed.). The Commercial Press, Ltd.

== Book series ==
- China Export Commodity Series
- Commercial Press New English Readers
- Da xue cong shu (Studies of scholars)
- Foreign Trade Association of China Monographs
- Gongheguo jiaoke shu xin guowen (National Readers for the New Republic)
- Liliput Series (1927)
- The Scenic China Series (1919)
- War Scenes of the Chinese Revolution
- Xue Bu shending Chudeng xiaoxue yong Zui xin Guowen jiaokeshu 學部審定 初等小學用 最新 國文教科書 [= Chinese national readers for primary schools; approved by the Board of Education of China]

== See also ==
- Commercial Press (Hong Kong)
- Commercial Press (Taiwan)
- Publishing industry in China
