= The Ladies' Journal =

Chinese women's magazine (1915–1931)

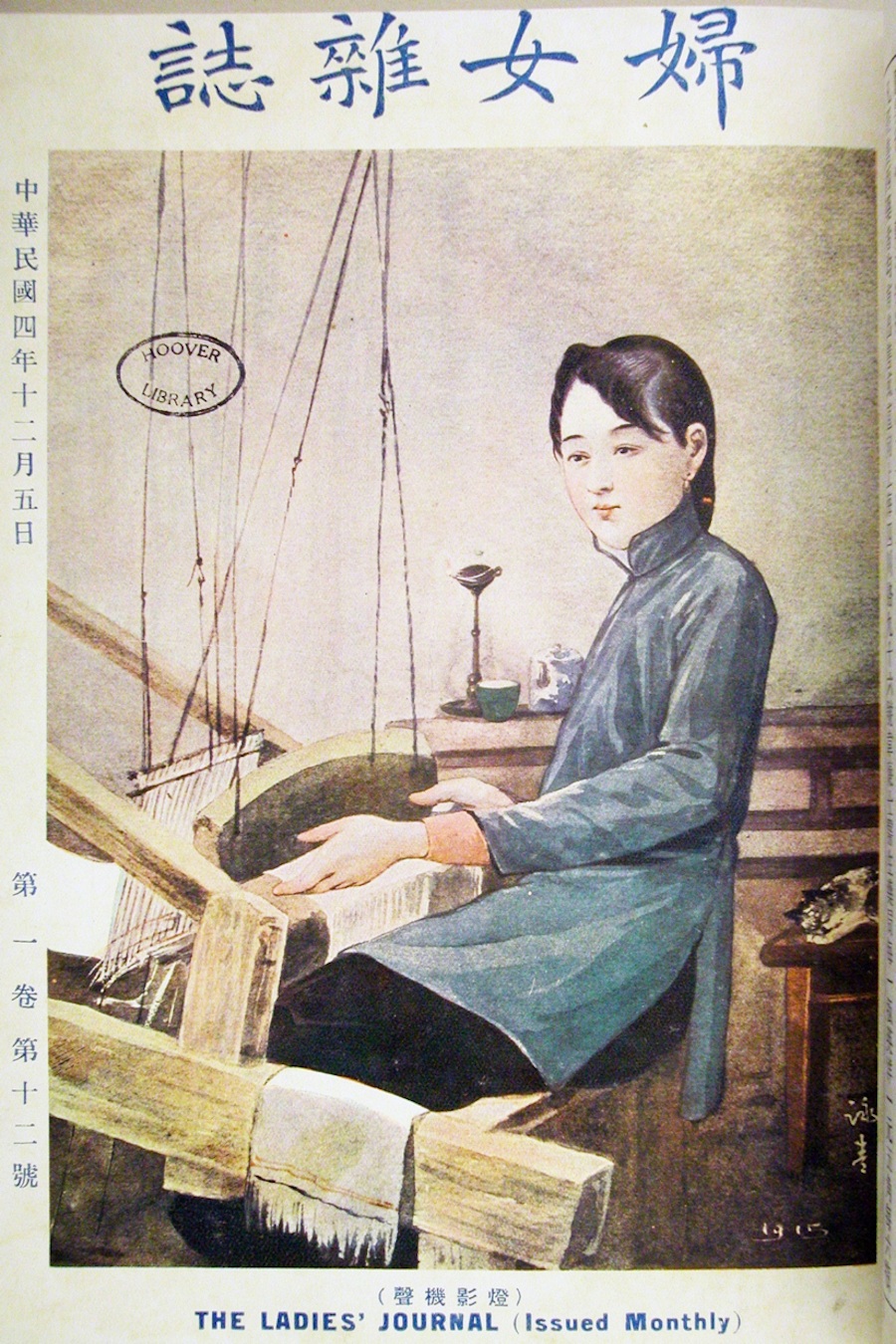
- Cover of the December 1915 issue
- Native name: 婦女雜誌; Fùnǚ zázhì
- Categories: Women's magazine
- Frequency: Monthly
- Circulation: 10,000 (1921)
- Publisher: Commercial Press
- First issue: January 1915
- Final issue: December 1931
- Country: China
- Based in: Shanghai
- Language: Literary Chinese (1915–1920); Vernacular Chinese; (1919–1931)
- OCLC: 474968117

The Ladies' Journal (Chinese: 婦女雜誌; pinyin: Fùnǚ zázhì) was a Chinese monthly women's magazine published from 1915 to 1931. Produced by the Shanghai-based Commercial Press, the largest publishing house in Republican China, the journal was the longest-lasting and widest-circulating women's magazine during the period, seeing a circulation of around 10,000 copies by 1921. The magazine began publication under the editorship of Wang Yunzhang, who also edited the Fiction Monthly. Described by later commentators as conservative in its early years, The Ladies' Journal included coverage of domestic issues, women's education, and serialized short stories, mainly of the "Mandarin duck and butterfly" genre of Chinese romantic fiction. Initially written in Classical Chinese, it began publishing short stories in written vernacular Chinese in 1917 and had fully transitioned to vernacular by 1920.

Accompanying criticisms for its conservative stances and a cultural shift towards feminism among New Culture journals following the May Fourth Movement in 1919, The Ladies' Journal took a turn towards coverage of social issues and translations of foreign literature, especially after Zhang Xichen became editor-in-chief in 1921. Although Zhang had no prior experience or interest writing about women's issues, he became a dedicated liberal feminist and recruited like-minded contributors to the journal, including his assistant editor Zhou Jianren. As a follower of Swedish feminist Ellen Key, Zhang promoted a more open attitude to sexuality and love marriage over arranged marriages. A 1925 special issue on the "new sexual morality" attracted significant backlash. This, alongside political disagreements with the Commercial Press, led to Zhang and Zhou's removal as editors. Zhang established a competitor journal entitled The New Woman, while The Ladies' Journal returned to a more conservative stance and a focus on domestic topics. Already struggling financially due to decreased advertiser investment during the Great Depression, the journal was canceled after the press's headquarters were destroyed in a month-long battle between Chinese and Japanese forces.

== History ==
The Chinese publishing industry expanded greatly over the 1890s and 1900s, spurred on by the introduction of Western printing technology and the creation of joint-stock companies. As the Chinese state ended its reliance on scholar-officials following the 1898 Hundred Days' Reform and the 1911 Republican Revolution, many intellectuals turned to the publishing industry. Tabloids and magazines (often carrying serialized short stories) were the most lucrative fields. Although many different women's periodicals were founded in China during this period (around 44 between 1898 and 1911), none lasted for more than a few years, most ceasing publication within a year. The self-financed nature of these early publications led to their editors accumulating debt and needing to cancel their magazines. They were informally distributed through peddlers or small bookstores, often resulting in difficulties in collecting the proceeds. Many saw circulations of only hundreds or a few thousand copies. Early journals tended to focus on feminist issues, advocating for gender equality, women's education, and the abolition of foot binding. In the early 1910s, around thirty new women's periodicals were founded. Press restrictions by Yuan Shikai's regime slowed the rate of new establishments from 1912 to 1916, but two hundred more women's periodicals emerged over the following two decades.

=== 1915–1920 ===
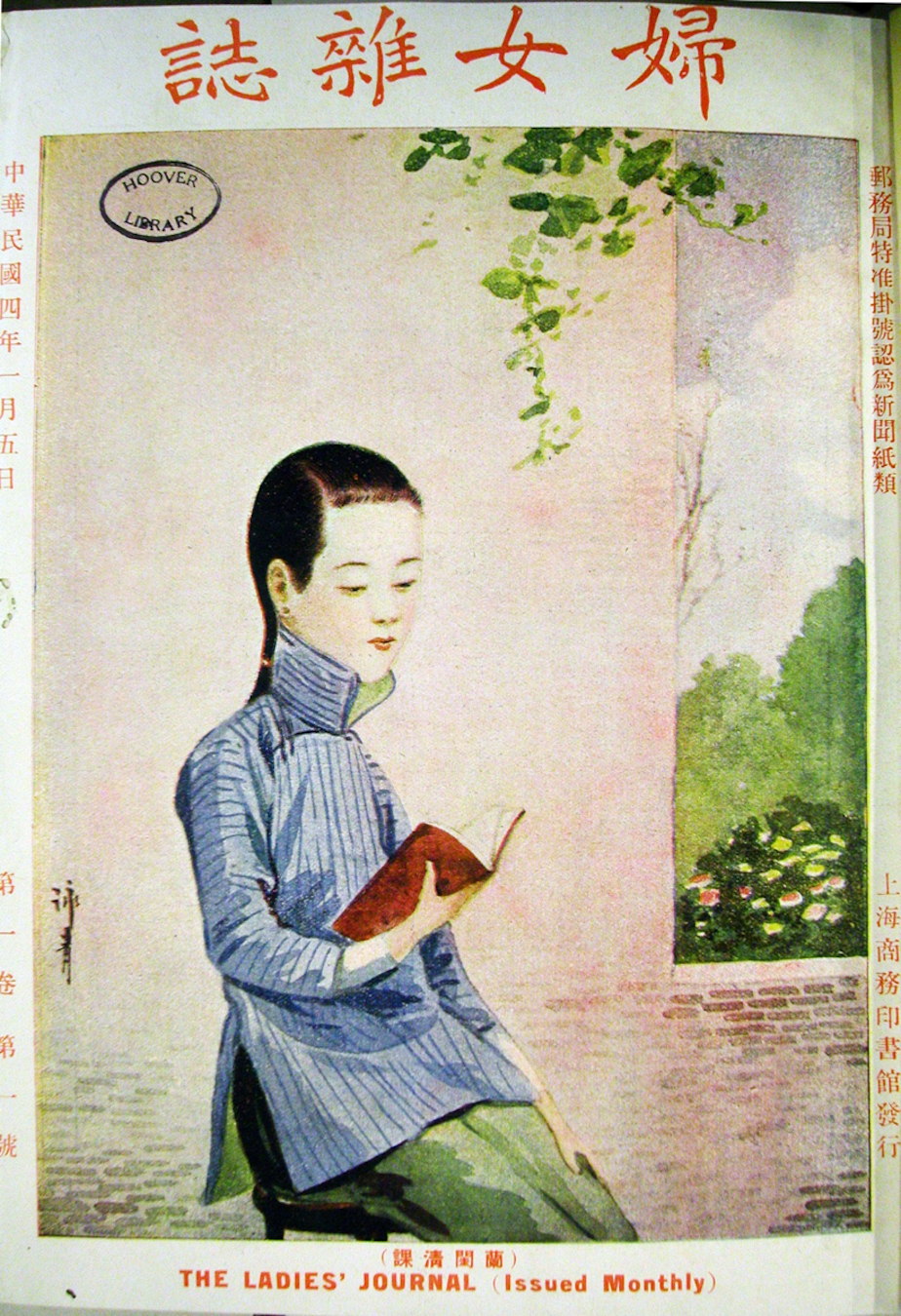
The cover of The Ladies' Journal's inaugural issue, January 1915

The Commercial Press entered into magazine publishing with the Diplomatic News (外交報; Wàijiāo bào) in 1902. They began the Eastern Miscellany (東方雜誌; Dōngfāng zázhì) in 1904 and the Chinese Educational Review (教育雜誌; Jiàoyù zázhì) in 1909, both of which saw commercial success. Throughout much of the early 20th century, they were the largest publishing house in China. Between 1902 and 1937, they published 76 periodicals, of which 16 ran for more than ten years. They began publishing a monthly women's magazine in January 1915, with the Chinese name Funü Zashi (婦女雜誌) and the English alternate title The Ladies' Journal. It initially saw a circulation of around 3,000 copies. Unlike previous women's magazines, it was distributed across the country thanks to the Commercial Press's established infrastructure. Based in Shanghai, the magazine was available in twenty-eight cities in China, as well as Hong Kong, Macau, and Singapore.

The magazine was aimed at urban women; it was necessarily also aimed at the middle- and upper-classes, as literacy was seen as a marker of class status during its period of publication. Much of its readership was likely male, attracted to the journal by its short stories and a desire to learn more about modern women. Similar journals such as the Women's Eastern Times (婦女時報; Fùnǚ shíbào) purportedly had as much as 90% of their readership consisting of men. One December 1915 announcement in The Ladies' Journal stated that "those who like science and the arts can buy our magazine; this journal is not only for women, but if women read it, we would appreciate it." One of its initial competitors was Woman's World (女子世界; Nǚzǐ shìjiè), a Shanghai magazine edited by Chen Diexian (陈蝶仙), which was first published in December 1914. The Ladies' Journal was more commercially successful, and Woman's World was forced to close in 1915 after just seven issues.

Wang Yunzhang (王蕴章) served as the journal's first editor-in-chief. He also served as the editor for another Commercial Press periodical, Fiction Monthly (小說月報; Xiǎoshuō yuèbào). During The Ladies' Journal's second volume in 1916, the female educator Hu Binxia (胡彬夏, also known as Zhu-Hu Binxia) officially served as its editor-in-chief, although Wang continued to exercise editorial control over the magazine. Hu wrote for the magazine, but likely did not edit it. Historians such as Chiang Yung-chen and Jacqueline Nivard have theorized that Hu's appointment may have been an attempt to draw more publicity to the journal due to her academic history, having been educated in both Japan and the United States. Hu stepped down in 1917, and Wang resumed full duties.

Wang became only an ostensible editor-in-chief in 1920, when the Commercial Press hired the writer Shen Yanbing (better known as Mao Dun) as the de facto editor of the magazine. Shen thought poorly of Wang, criticizing him for being a member of the "Saturday School" of low-brow popular fiction. Already unpopular with many of the other contributors to the journal, Wang left the Commercial Press in November 1920. Shen was offered the editorship of both The Ladies' Journal and Fiction Monthly; unwilling to manage both journals, he chose to take over editor duties at Fiction Monthly only.

=== 1921–1925 ===
In the aftermath of the May Fourth Movement (a cultural and political movement begun in 1919), many other women's magazines (alongside women's columns in newspapers) were established, although The Ladies' Journal had a longer duration of publication and a wider circulation than any of its competitors. Zhang Xichen (章锡琛), formerly a staff member of the Eastern Miscellany, took over as editor-in-chief of The Ladies' Journal in January 1921. Zhang later wrote that the Commercial Press cared little about the content of The Ladies' Journal, valuing it solely for profit, and that they were unable to find anyone else to take over after Shen's departure. Zhang was given largely unrestricted control over the journal, despite having no previous writing experience in women's issues nor interest in the topic.

Soon after becoming the editor, Zhang lowered the cost of the magazine from three to two jiao. Alongside a shift towards a more explicitly feminist perspective, this significantly increased readership, and circulation soon tripled to 10,000 per issue. This was extremely high for a women's journal in China, although it was quite small in comparison to similar magazines in Japan and the United States. There were likely several times more readers than the number of copies sold, as copies were often passed among many readers. The American sinologist Roswell S. Britton wrote in 1933 that individual magazine issues were passed between an estimated ten to twenty readers.

Despite the growth, the journal continued to receive the vast majority of its submissions from men, prompting Zhang to write editorials proclaiming that The Ladies' Journal was a "discursive space for women with lofty ideals" and calling on women to take an increased role in the call for their emancipation. In January 1922, Zhang took on the activist Zhou Jianren as the assistant editor of the journal.

The Commercial Press's head editor Wang Yun-wu took Zhang and Zhou off the editorial team following public criticism of a January 1925 special issue on sexual morality and a dispute over Zhang's participation in the May Thirtieth Movement. Their last issue was in August 1925. In response to crackdowns and censorship by the Beiyang government, the Commercial Press had begun to avoid publishing progressive literature, lessening their tolerance for Zhang's radicalism. Zhang was moved to another Commercial Press journal, Natural World (自然界; Zìránjiè), before leaving the Commercial Press entirely later that year. After leaving the magazine, Zhang and many of his close colleagues followed him to his new publishing house, Kaiming Press, and worked on a new feminist journal named The New Woman (新女性; Xīn nǚxìng). The New Woman was a direct competitor of The Ladies' Journal until the former ceased publication in 1929, and Kaiming became one of the five largest publishing houses in China.

=== 1926–1931 ===
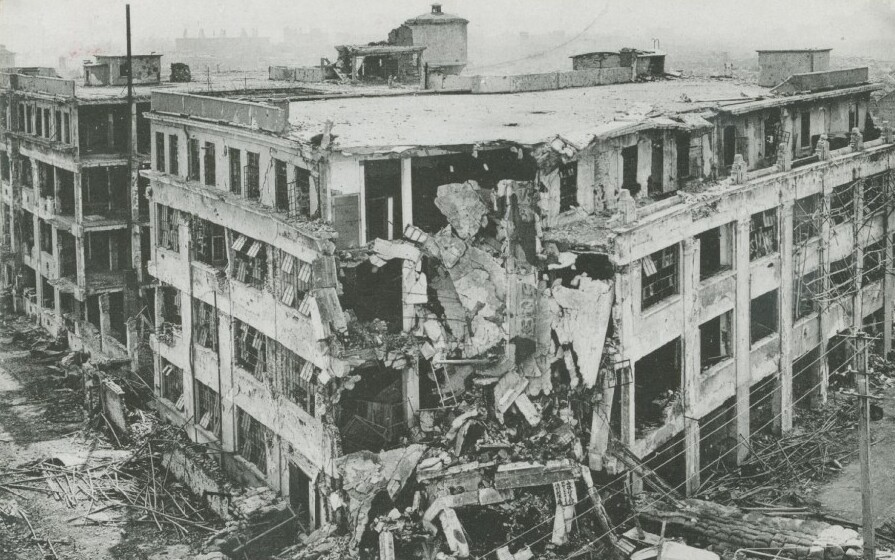
Ruins of the Commercial Press headquarters after the January 28 incident

Wang appointed a long-time employee of the press, Du Jiutian (杜就田), to serve as editor of The Ladies' Journal from September 1925 to June 1930. He was viewed as incompetent by some editors. The scholar Jin Jungwon characterized him as a "headache" for the press but unable to be fired, as he was the cousin of Du Yaquan, a prominent Commercial Press science editor. His uneventful tenure saw the magazine return to a more traditional stance. Seeking to revitalize the magazine and possibly facing financial problems (similar to those that led to the demise of The New Woman), the writer and activist Ye Shengtao (previously a Fiction Monthly editor) took over in mid-1930.

Ye left only nine months later, when he was replaced by Yang Runyu (楊潤餘), a female writer who had previously studied abroad in France and wrote columns on French literature for the magazine. Some sources claim that Yang was only a nominal director, and that the former assistant editor Jin Zhonghua served as the de facto editor-in-chief. The journal remained popular in its later years despite the changes in editorial staff. Surveys in 1925 and 1930 found that The Ladies' Journal remained one of the most popular magazines among the Chinese public. An analysis of reader letters from a health advice column in the magazine suggests an increasing female readership during the mid-1920s, the proportion of letters from women rising from 20% in 1925 to around 50% after 1928.

The journal's last issue was in December 1931. Beginning on 28 January 1932, Shanghai was the center of a month-long battle between Chinese and Japanese forces. Shortly after fighting broke out, the Commercial Press headquarters were destroyed, their printing works bombed and magazine offices burned to the ground; the Commercial Press leadership presumed the attack was an attempt to halt the production of their anti-Japanese publications. Already facing financial difficulties due to decreased advertising revenue in the wake of the Great Depression, the Commercial Press canceled The Ladies' Journal, although the Eastern Miscellany soon returned to publication. The Ladies' Journal had a total of 17 volumes and 204 issues over its publication.

== Content ==
=== Initial period ===
Later scholars such as Jacqueline Nivard and Wang Zheng have characterized The Ladies' Journal as taking a conservative stance during its first four-to-six years of publication, under the editorship of Wang Yunzhang. Significant debate and division on the role of women existed within the journal from an early stage. Many early contributors—alongside Wang himself—were writers of the "Mandarin duck and butterfly" genre of romantic fiction, sometimes criticized as melodramatic and beholden to traditionalist social values. Serialized short stories associated with this genre frequently ran in the journal, boosting its popularity among younger women. Such stories often featured Western protagonists, and commonly Americans.

Women's education was a major focus throughout the magazine's publication. It also sought to showcase ideal role models for women, showcasing women in a variety of careers and activities through articles and photos, as well as providing biographies of famous women. Articles on Western technology and medicine, mainly translated from Japanese sources, were very common, as were more general advice on topics such as housekeeping, bookkeeping, medical care, and gardening. Some coverage was of more technical subjects, such as aquaculture, beekeeping, papermaking, and wild mushroom identification. Food writing included coverage of nutrition and a mix of both Western and traditional Chinese recipes. Many non-fiction articles credited to editor Wang Yunzhang were translations from the Japanese magazine Fujin Sekai and the American Ladies' Home Journal.

A regular column entitled "literary scene" (文苑; wényuàn) published poetry. Initially, this was limited to that written by historical women; in the third issue, men's works about female poets began to be published, and by the second year, it began to consist mostly of works about women by men. Initially this section also included essays written by women, but these were later spun off into an "exposition" (論說; lùnshuō) column. A fiction column (小說; xiǎoshuō) published serialized tanci (a form of verse fiction), most of which were written by the popular writer Cheng Zhanlu (程瞻廬). The first fiction work signed by a woman that was published in the journal was a serialized story entitled Lingering Music in the Capital City (玉京餘韻; Yùjīng yúyùn), which was published across five issues in the second volume (1916). It was signed under the name "Hua Qianlin" (華潛麟); although it is not certain that it was written by a woman, as male authors during the period sometimes wrote under women's names. More fiction submitted by women began to appear in the following issues. Other recurring columns in the journal included entertainment, reports, miscellaneous subjects, and a supplement.

From the third volume (1917) onward, some stories in the journal were written in vernacular Chinese as opposed to the literary Classical Chinese, following the New Culture Movement (an intellectual movement against the perceived shortcomings of traditional Chinese society) and its promotion of vernacular literature. In 1919 and 1920, the journal shifted entirely to vernacular Chinese. It was announced to be the official language of the journal in January 1920. Articles also became much longer from late 1919 onward, and began to cover social issues and theoretical topics.

=== May Fourth era ===
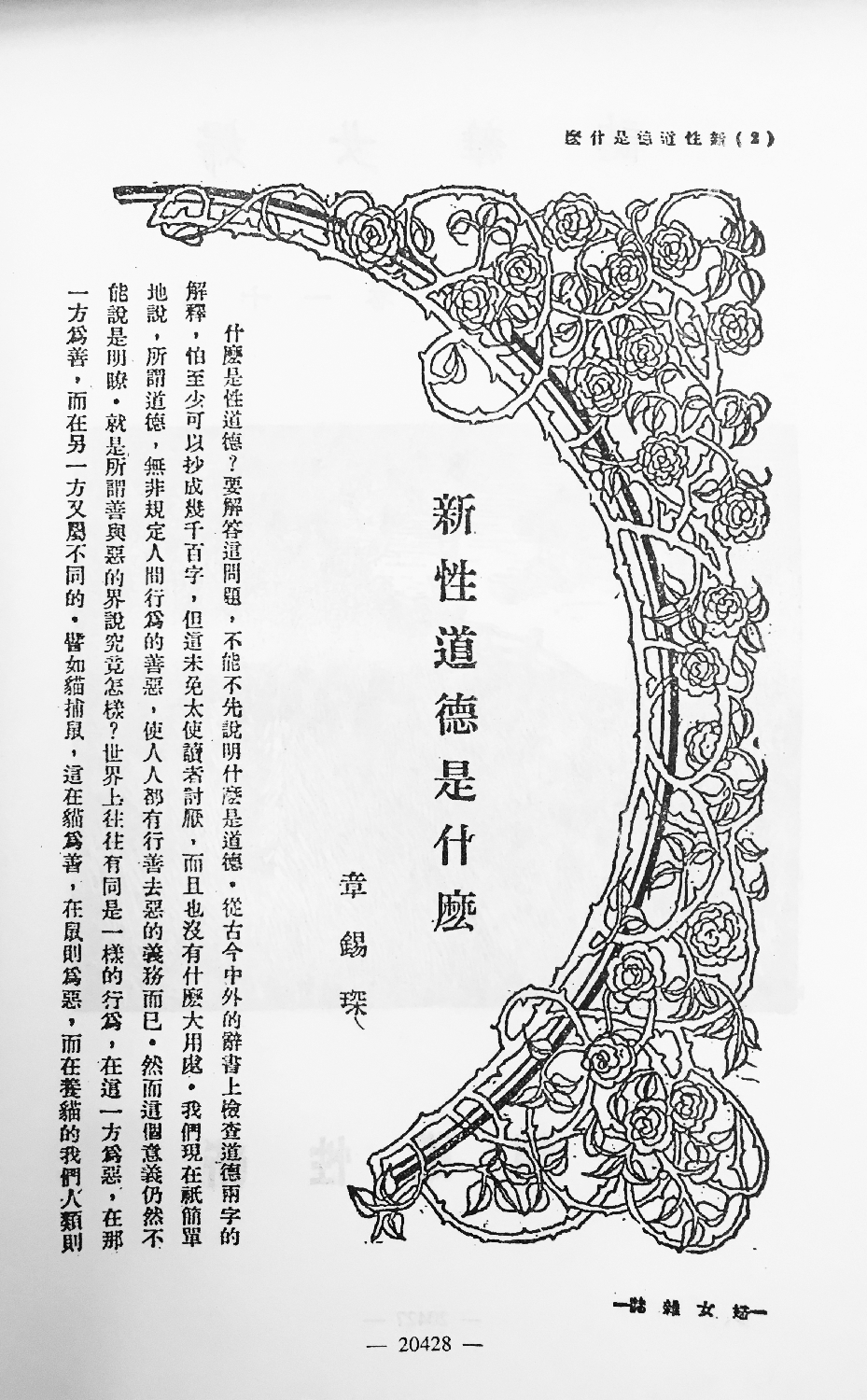
The cover of the controversial January 1925 special issue on the "new sexual morality"

In the wake of the May Fourth Movement, feminist writings became more common in New Culture periodicals. The Commercial Press had adopted a conservative stance during the 1910s, but by the end of the decade this had grown unpopular, with sales declining across many of its publications in 1918 and 1919. In May 1919, the scholar and May Fourth Movement activist Luo Jialun published a critique of the Commercial Press magazines in the New Culture journal New Tide (新潮; Xīncháo), writing that The Ladies' Journal "talks of women as if they were slaves of men; [the journal] is a real crime against mankind". Several major Commercial Press periodicals, including The Ladies' Journal, underwent reforms of leadership and structure in 1919. Shen Yanbing, who became the de facto editor of the paper in 1920, published some of the first articles in the journal advocating for women's liberation. These included an introductory essay on Western feminist movements in the August 1920 issue.

The Ladies' Journal began to more explicitly focus on social issues, especially feminism, once Zhang Xichen became the editor-in-chief in 1921. A liberal and feminist, Zhang recruited like-minded authors—mainly, although not exclusively men—from the Chinese Literary Association (文學研究會; Wénxué yánjiūhuì) and the Woman Question Research Association (婦女問題研究會; Fùnǚ wèntí yánjiūhuì), the latter of which he founded in 1922. Inspired by the writings of the Swedish feminist Ellen Key, he championed the principles of love marriage (as opposed to arranged marriage), free divorce, motherhood, and a new sexual morality. Zhang and other Chinese followers of Key proposed that romantic love should be the sole reason for marriage. Dubbing his ideas "love morality" (戀愛道德; liàn'ài dàodé), Zhang saw premarital, extramarital, and polyamorous sex as permissible if they were mediated by feelings of romantic love. Zhang and his co-contributors opposed singlehood as an option for women. In response to an essay by Jiang Fengzi (among the journal's most prolific female contributors during the early 1920s) advocating it, Zhang labeled the increase in singlehood "a sick phenomenon in a civilized society".

The journal became the primary feminist magazine in China during Zhang's editorship. It moved away from coverage of domestic matters, with translations of foreign works restricted to social, political, and theoretical topics. Several feminist writers had their work translated and featured in the journal. Many of these were Japanese feminists, such as Yosano Akiko; others were Western feminists, almost invariably those who had been previously translated in the Japanese feminist journal Seitō. Translated writings by eugenicists and birth control advocates such as Havelock Ellis, Francis Galton, Marie Stopes, and Margaret Sanger were also included. A correspondence column allowed readers to participate in social discussions. In 1921, the journal introduced a column titled "reader writings" (讀者文藝; dúzhě wényì), resulting in an increase in female contributors of poetry and fiction to the magazine. Three years later, a literature column was introduced to showcase new-style fiction and drama. Zhang canceled the correspondence column in 1924, citing a lack of reader interest, and increased the number of editorials.

Beginning in 1922, Zhang began to run special issues dedicated to particular topics. These included issues focused on prostitution, feminism, choosing a spouse, and 'domestic revolution' among other topics. In a January 1925 special issue on "The New Sexual Morality" (新性道德; xīnxìng dàodé), Zhang and Zhou (alongside two guest writers, Shen Yanbing and his brother Shen Zemin) argued that morality should be based around doing what one wishes as long as it does not harm others, and extended this framework to sexual relations. Zhang argued that the focus on monogamous marriages and the nuclear family was restrictive, and advocated instead for free love. Two months later, the Peking University professor Chen Daqi attacked their articles as conservative, arguing that their position on polyamory would be in effect a return to traditional polygamy. The Commercial Press was unwilling to let the two editors write a response, although Zhang rebuked Chen's criticisms in editorials in Contemporary Review (現代評論; Xiàndài pínglùn) and Wilderness (莽原; Mǎngyuán). Zhang was pulled from his position as editor-in-chief several months later.

=== Later years ===
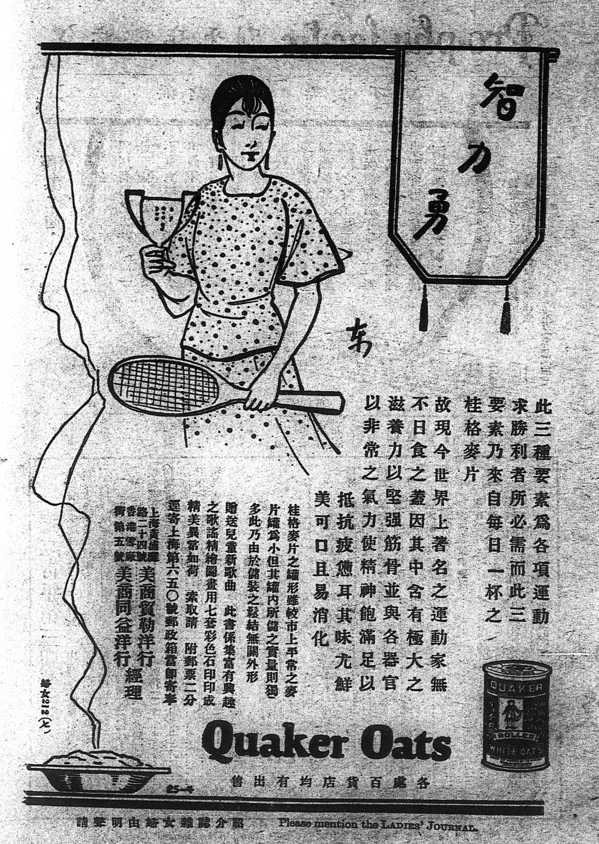
An advertisement for Quaker Oats in the magazine, 1926

After Zhang's departure, the magazine returned to a more conservative stance, emphasizing motherhood. Discussions of social issues were removed, as were most translations of foreign literature. Instead, the journal focused on stories sent in by readers, which became the majority of the content featured in the magazine. Special issues on art were published in 1926 and 1929. These included coverage of a variety of art forms (ranging from seal carving and traditional painting to photography), profiles on notable female artists, and advocacy for women to get involved in careers in art fields. The 1929 issue, dedicated to the First National Art Exhibition in Shanghai, featured extensive coverage of the female painter Pan Yuliang.

Ye Shengtao revived the magazine's advice and correspondence columns in 1931, again allowing for dialogue between readers and editors in the magazine. During the journal's final years, it took more left-wing stances, possibly due to the growing influence of the Chinese Communist Party and the creation of a leftist writer's league in Shanghai in 1930. Coverage of Western literature and thought was reintroduced, and Chinese intellectuals such as Feng Zikai and Qian Juntao (钱君匋) supplied essays on Western art and culture. Other intellectuals, such as Tao Xisheng (陶希圣) and Chen Wangdao, wrote articles advocating for the empowerment of women. A special issue on women's writing, the only one in the periodical's history, was published in 1931. This issue was mainly focused on Western women writers (such as the Brontë sisters and Agnes Smedley), with little mention of contemporary Chinese women authors. The journal's final issue in December 1931, produced shortly before the Japanese bombing of the Commercial Press headquarters, included two lengthy articles warning women of the threat the Empire of Japan posed to them, and called on them to stay informed.

== Covers ==
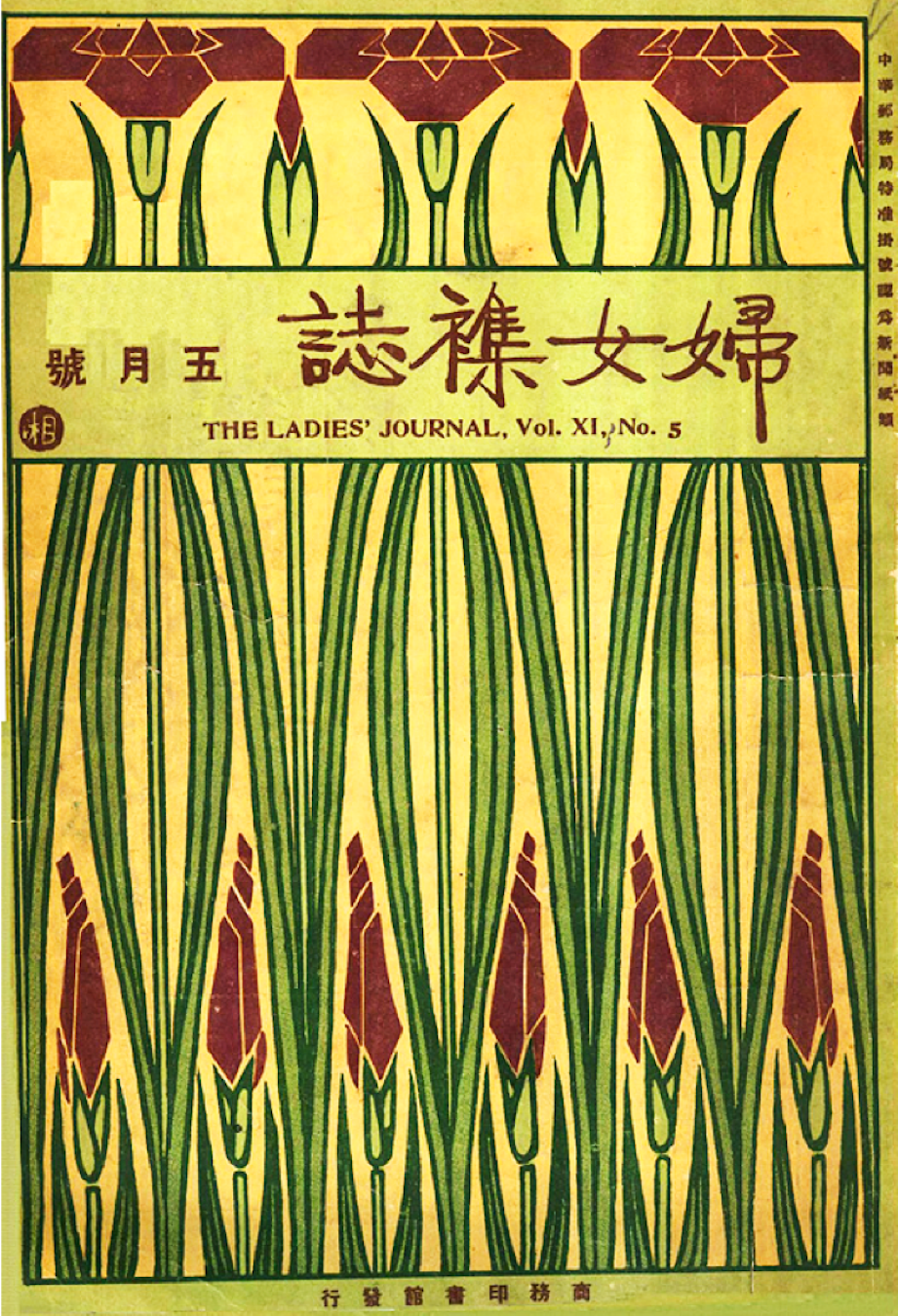
Cover of the May 1925 issue, showing an Art Deco floral motif

Xu Yonqing (徐詠青), previously the illustrator for the Women's Eastern Times, was the first illustrator for The Ladies' Journal, producing covers featuring ordinary women in domestic settings. Xu left Commercial Press to join the Shanghai Art Academy in 1915, and the female painter and calligrapher Jin Zhang took over for the second volume in 1916. She produced covers featuring full-color bird-and-flower paintings surrounded by botanical motifs. This format largely continued the following year, although the covers switched to black-and-white with a greater focus on narrative paintings. In 1918 and 1919, the covers switched to traditional Chinese landscape paintings, discarding European design embellishments, although they returned to bird-and-flower paintings in 1920.

When Zhang Xichen and Zhou Jianren took over editorship of the journal in 1921, the cover changed to a fixed design which included a floral motif and the silhouette of a peacock framed by the moon. Over the following years, the cover design began to emphasize the text, sometimes forgoing an illustration entirely in favor of an abstract pattern or a plain color. For the 1924 volume, all covers bore a painting by Zhou's cousin Li Licheng (酈荔丞) of a pair of birds perching on a flowering branch. The following year, the covers began using Art Deco botanical designs. Under Du Jiantai's editorship in the late 1920s, The Ladies' Journal commissioned commercial artists for issue covers. In an issue dedicated to the 1929 First National Art Exhibition, the journal used a preexisting Art Deco piece by the male painter Jiang Zhaohe. For the issues in 1930, seeking a unified visual identity for the journal, the Commercial Press hired Qian Juntao to illustrate the journal. The cover returned to a consistent design, using an Art Deco botanical design by Qian. He left following Ye's departure in early 1931, and a younger modernist designer named Zhang Lingtao (張令濤) took over as illustrator for the rest of the journal's final year.
