= Zhang Xichen =

Chinese editor and publisher (1889–1969)

- Zhang, c. 1950s
- Born: September 24, 1889; Mashan, Shaoxing, Zhejiang, Qing China
- Died: June 5, 1969 (aged 79); Beijing, People's Republic of China
- Resting place: Babaoshan Revolutionary Cemetery
- Occupations: Educator; editor; publisher
- Employer(s): Commercial Press, Kaiming Press
- Spouse: Wu Ouzhang (m. 1906; died 1968)

Chinese name
- Traditional Chinese: 章錫琛
- Simplified Chinese: 章锡琛
Transcriptions
Standard Mandarin
- Hanyu Pinyin: Zhāng Xīchēn
- Wade–Giles: Chang^{1} Hsi^{1}-chʻên^{1}
- IPA: [ʈʂáŋ ɕíʈʂʰə́n]

Zhang Xichen (Chinese: 章锡琛; pinyin: Zhāng Xīchēn; 24 September 1889 – 5 June 1969) was a Chinese editor who founded the publishing firm Kaiming Press. Born to a family of poor merchants near Shaoxing, he received traditional tutoring, failed to pass the civil service exams, and was forced to drop out of a private school in order to enter an arranged marriage when he was 17. He established a rudimentary primary school for his hometown, enrolling in a normal school after an inspector refused to certify him. He grew close to the school's principal, who found him employment at the Shanghai publisher Commercial Press in 1912.

Initially serving as an assistant editor for The Eastern Miscellany, he was appointed as the editor-in-chief of the women's magazine The Ladies' Journal in 1921. Despite lacking prior interest, he became deeply invested in women's issues, pushing the journal towards a feminist perspective and founding a study group to promote gender equality. The magazine was successful under his tenure, but he caused scandal after a 1925 special issue on the "new sexual morality", in which he advocated for free love and criticized monogamous marriages and the nuclear family as restrictive. He was removed from editorship and later fired by the Commercial Press after establishing a competitor magazine titled The New Women with a group of his colleagues.

New Women and his academic society began to serve as a de facto publishing firm, and on the urging of his friends, he incorporated it as Kaiming Press in 1926. Initially focused on gender and sexuality materials, the press saw success in the school textbook market and incorporated as a joint-stock company in 1929. Chosen to head the publication and circulation divisions, he founded the journal The Juvenile Student in 1930. He was one of a few Kaiming employees who stayed in Shanghai after the headquarters's destruction during the 1937 Battle of Shanghai, and continued to serve as a manager until 1949, when he was removed after a corporate dispute. He became the deputy editor-in-chief of the Zhonghua Book Company in 1955. He came under political criticism as a rightist during the Anti-Rightist Campaign and the Cultural Revolution, but was posthumously rehabilitated.

== Early life and education ==
On 24 August 1889, Zhang Xichen was born the eldest son of a family of poor merchants in the small market town of Mashan near Shaoxing, in Zhejiang, China. His father was named Zhang Yuanyong (章元庸) and owned a construction materials supply store. Xichen was betrothed to his future wife when he was four years old. As a child, he attended traditional private schools, interrupted by a two-year bout of malaria when he was twelve. He twice entered and failed the county-level civil service examinations. In 1905, after the examinations were abolished, he enrolled in a three-month Japanese class at a language school in Shaoxing. Following this, he failed the entrance exam to the county's modernized school, and enrolled instead at a private secondary school in 1906. After around half a year, when he was 17, he was forced to drop out after his father called him back home to enter the arranged marriage with his betrothed, Wu Ouzhang (吳耦莊).

Around a year after he returned to live with his parents, they enlisted him as a schoolteacher for local children, including his younger brothers. The town had no school, so he established a rudimentary elementary school in a vacant house, naming it Yude Primary School (育德學堂; Yùdé xuétáng). He served as vice-principal of the school, enlisting a teenage friend to serve as its principal (and only other teacher). Other townsfolk were impressed with the school, and enrollment reached over a hundred students. However, a county inspector refused to certify Yude, and Zhang enrolled in a teacher's training program at the Shanhui Normal School in 1909. There, he grew close to the school's principal, Du Haisheng (杜海生). Yude closed the following year, as Zhang was required to train at other schools over the year following his graduation. Under Du's recommendation, Zhang was hired at the Shaoxing Women's Normal School in 1911, where he served as the de facto principal. Zhang disliked this position, and sought employment elsewhere.

== Commercial Press and The Ladies' Journal ==
Du recommended Zhang to his nephew Du Yaquan, a scholar and editor for the Shanghai-based publishing firm Commercial Press. Du Yaquan hired Zhang in 1912 as his assistant editor for The Eastern Miscellany, the company's most popular magazine. As an editor for the journal, he was tasked with translating essays from Japanese journals and compiling a "Chronology of Major Events" at the back of each issue.

In 1919, in the wake of the May Fourth Movement, several Commercial Press periodicals fell under intellectual criticism, and underwent reforms of leadership structure. Among these was The Ladies' Journal, a woman's magazine founded in 1915 which was primarily focused on domestic topics. The scholar and May Fourth leader Luo Jialun denounced it in the journal New Tide (新潮; Xīncháo) as a "crime against mankind" for its conservative and anti-feminist stances. The Ladies' Journal was among the press's least popular magazines, and Zhang later accused the Commercial Press of maintaining it only for profit, not caring for its editorial direction. Shen Yanbing (better known as Mao Dun) took over editorship of the periodical in May 1919. After the former editor-in-chief Wang Yunzhang left the company November 1920, Shen was additionally offered the editorship of the literary magazine Fiction Monthly (小說月報; Xiǎoshuō yuèbào); unwilling to manage both publications, he chose to move to Fiction Monthly. With no one else to serve as editor for The Ladies' Journal, the new Eastern Miscellany head editor Qian Zhixiu recommended that Zhang be appointed to the role. Zhang had no prior experience or interest in women's issues, and initially was hesitant to take the position; however, he accepted the offer after Qian promised to assist in editing.

Taking over the journal in January 1921, Zhang chose the scholar and contributor Zhou Jianren as his assistant editor. Soon after becoming the editor, Zhang lowered the cost of the magazine from three to two jiao. Alongside a shift towards a more explicitly feminist perspective, this significantly increased readership, and circulation soon tripled to 10,000 per issue. He also moved the coverage away from domestic matters, in favor of translations of foreign works on social, political, and theoretical topics.

In August 1922, Zhang, Zhou, Shen, and 14 other contributors to The Ladies' Journal founded the "Women's Questions Research Association" (婦女問題研究會; Fùnǚ wèntí yánjiūhuì), one of many such May Fourth era scholarly societies. Seeing women as enslaved by traditional Confucian gender roles and inspired by feminist movements in Europe, the society aimed to study and promote gender equality. Zhang ran into political tensions with the Commercial Press leadership, including the company's president Wang Yunwu, who was particularly angered by his decision for his Research Association to join an anti-imperialist alliance of academic societies after the May Thirtieth Incident.

Gravitating towards a liberal and feminist perspective for the journal, Zhang recruited like-minded authors—mainly, although not exclusively men. Inspired by the writings of the Swedish feminist Ellen Key, he championed the principles of love marriage (as opposed to arranged marriage), free divorce, motherhood, and a new sexual morality. Zhang and other Chinese followers of Key proposed that romantic love should be the sole reason for marriage. Dubbing his ideas "love morality" (戀愛道德; liàn'ài dàodé), he saw premarital, extramarital, and polyamorous sex as permissible if they were mediated by feelings of romantic love. The journal became the primary feminist magazine in China during Zhang's editorship.

=== "New Sexual Morality" controversy ===
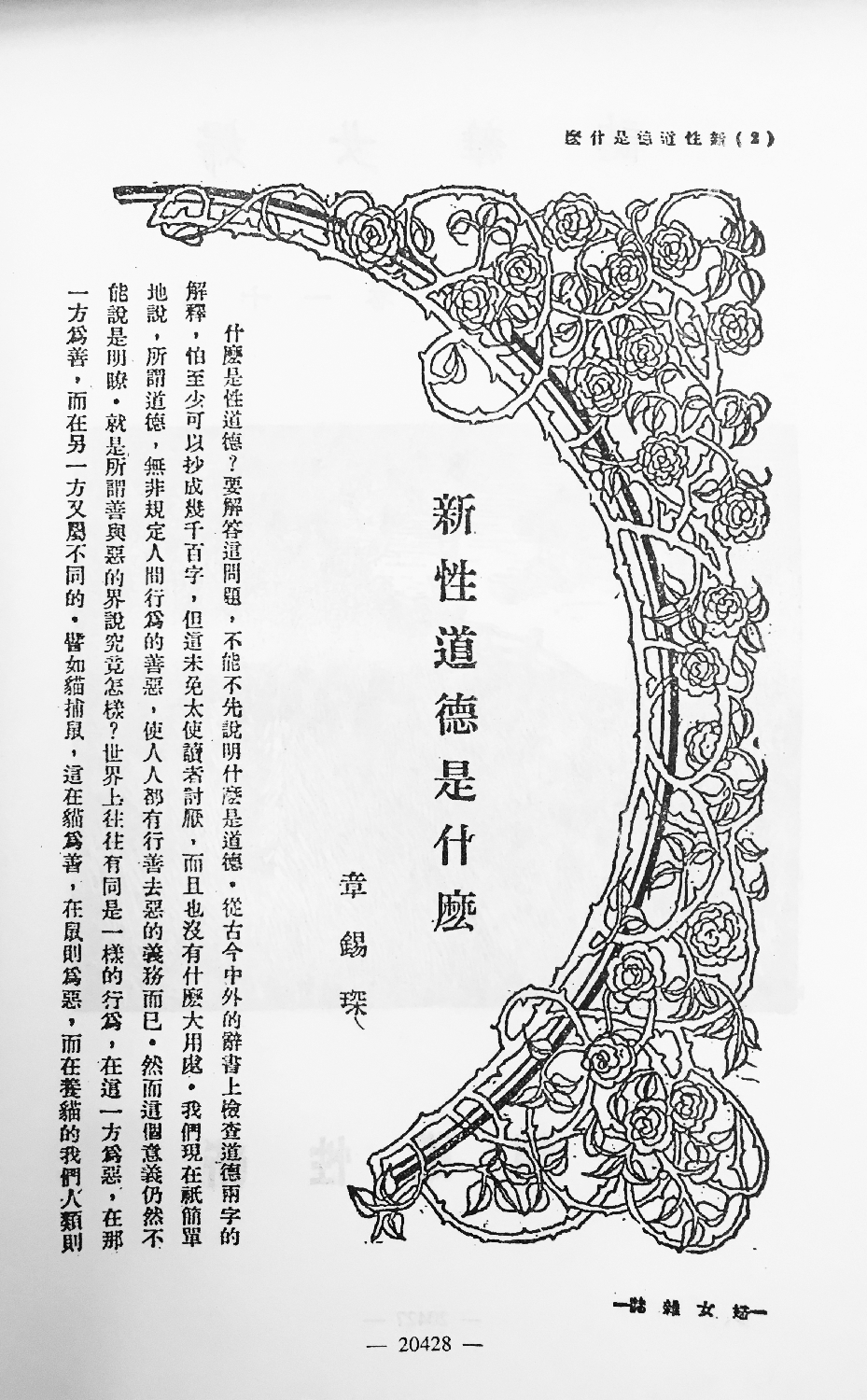
The cover of the controversial January 1925 special issue on the "new sexual morality"

Beginning in 1922, Zhang began to run special issues dedicated to particular topics. A January 1925 special issue on "The New Sexual Morality" (新性道德; xīnxìng dàodé) departed from the conventional liberal feminist perspective and explored moral relativism. Zhang and Zhou (alongside two guest writers, Shen Yanbing and his brother Shen Zemin) argued that morality should be based around doing what one wishes as long as it does not harm others, and extended this framework to sexual relations. Zhang argued that the focus on monogamous marriages and the nuclear family was restrictive, and advocated instead for free love. Two months later, the Peking University professor Chen Daqi attacked their articles as socially regressive, arguing that their position on polyamory would be in effect a return to traditional polygamy. The Commercial Press was unwilling to let the two editors write a response, although Zhang rebuked Chen's criticisms in editorials in the Contemporary Review (現代評論; Xiàndài pínglùn). A Woman's Weekly (妇女周刊; Fùnǚ zhōukān) article in June summarized the conflict, stating that Chen was arguing from the perspective of the current marriage system, while Zhang and Zhou's analysis reimagined it from a future utopian perspective.

Zhang and Zhou's responses were also submitted to the magazine Wilderness (莽原; Mǎngyuán), edited by Zhou's brother Lu Xun. Lu had published Chen's criticisms the day prior, but did not respond to Zhang and Zhou's requests until they sent him a second letter a month later. Initially hesitant to publish them, Lu only published their unabridged responses after seeing their abridged version in the Contemporary Review. As the scandal grew, further criticism of Zhang emerged from both the political left and right; communists dubbed his outlook a "petite bourgeoisie mentality", while conservatives attacked his formulation of free love as "something even more radical than communism". Zhang was removed from his post as editor of The Ladies' Journal in August 1925 and reassigned to the Commercial Press's Chinese Language Division, while the journal returned to its more conservative and domestic roots.

== New Women ==
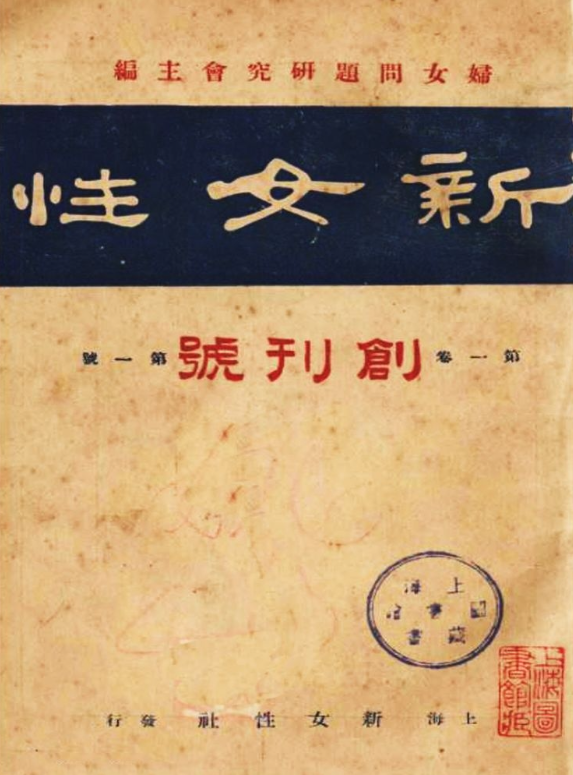
Cover of the inaugural issue of New Women, January 1926

Commercial Press staff such as Eastern Miscellany editor Hu Yuzhi and Fiction Monthly editor Zheng Zhenduo, alongside the members of the Women's Questions Research Association, were angered by Zhang's removal from editorship and the change in coverage by The Ladies' Journal. Hu reportedly proposed that Zhang establish a new women's magazine alongside Zhou. A group of around 40–50 friends and supporters coalesced into a committee to launch the new magazine, dubbed New Women (新女性; Xīn nǚxìng). Each of these supporters donated five yuan to pay for the printing and distribution expenses, while interested contributors volunteered to write for the journal without pay.

As Zhang sought to continue working at the Commercial Press while launching the rival periodical, Wu Juenong agreed to serve as its nominal editor-in-chief. The journal was managed from Wu's one-room apartment. Initially planned for January 1926, they were able to complete and finish the first issue of New Women in mid-December 1925. Around this time, a strike action broke out at the Commercial Press, and rumors circulated that Zhang had organized the strike. Du Yaquan knew that Zhang was associated with a new journal competing with the Commercial Press, and had him fired. Zhang considered returning to teaching in rural Shaoxing, but was pressured by his colleagues to stay in Shanghai to manage the new periodical. He later wrote "all my friends insisted that someone had to be in charge of it. And in their mind, that someone was me." An acquaintance gave Zhang a part-time job at the Shengzhou Girls' School so that he could have a basic income.

The Women's Questions Research Association began to function as a de facto publisher after Zhang left the Commercial Press. After his colleagues offered him their manuscripts to publish as part of a book series titled after the association, Zhang contracted with a printing company to produce the books, and with the Guanghua Press (光華書局; Guānghuá shūjú) to distribute them. New Women became a success for the fledgling firm, seeing an initial circulation of around 3,000 copies, which rose to 10,000 by the end of 1926, giving Zhang the income needed to quit his teaching job.

New Women increasingly focused on sexuality topics during the latter portion of 1926, with discussions of sexual reform, sexual education, and human biology frequently included. The accompanying book series also included frequent discussions of sexuality; seven out of the first nine books in the series focused on the topic. Zhang edited three of the association's books in 1926: Collected Debates on New Sexual Morality, On the Question of Women, and a translated document entitled Sexual Knowledge which he published under the pen name Feng Ke. Collected Debates on New Sexuality Morality featured the arguments of both sides of the debate between The Ladies' Journal's editors and Chen Daqi. Although resentful towards Chen for costing him his job at the Commercial Press, he praised him as a worthy opponent in advertisements for the book, writing "Chen, Zhang, and Zhou, were all great spokespersons of the media [...] Ink flies and words dance—indeed, a great spectacle for the eye."

Also in 1926, the scholar Zhang Jingsheng released a controversial sexology text titled Sex Histories, regarded by many intellectuals as pornographic. The rampant popularity of the book upset Zhang Xichen, as it prompted it to be compared with New Women. Many readers came to Kaiming interested in purchasing the book, which it did not stock. Zhang Xichen released a public statement about the book in early 1927, writing "for those of our readers who love [pornographic] materials, please do not trouble yourself to send requests to us—we do not feel obligated to respond."

Following this announcement, Zhang wrote an editorial in the March 1927 edition of New Women, where he expressed his shock that readers confused his publications with Sex Histories. He began to write less for the magazine after mid-1926, likely due to his increased work in the publishing industry. New Women broadened its coverage and lessened its emphasis on sexual liberation while incorporating other forms of political radicalism, especially anarchism. Zhang announced that the magazine would be discontinued in 1929, declaring "If we lean to the left, in this country where the [Kuomintang] Party hold hegemony over everything, we run the risk of being branded as 'red' and thus getting our heads chopped off [...] Since neither turning toward the left or the right suits us, we finally decided to fold the magazine." In addition to these political tensions, it also likely faced a decline in retaining contributors and readers.

== Kaiming Press ==
Zhang's colleagues in the Women's Questions Research Association had resented their lack of artistic autonomy under the Commercial Press, leading to brief attempts to collaborate with other publishing firms or found their own over the early 1920s. Calls for a new press were revived following Zhang's split from the Commercial Press. His colleague Sun Fuyuan chose the name Kaiming Press (开明书店; Kāimíng shūdiàn), a neologism intended to evoke the European Enlightenment. He received many offers of investment by his colleagues to start the press, although many of them were not able to later provide the promised funding. Zhang financed much of the early expenses for the operation using his severance pay from the Commercial Press. Afterwards, he borrowed money from his brother Zhang Xishan (章錫珊) to stay solvent, later hiring him as the company's accountant; the influence of the Zhang brothers led to the nickname "Brother's Press" (兄弟書店; Xiōngdì shūdiàn) for the first few years of its existence. A manifesto announcing the new press was published on 1 August 1926.

=== Company expansion ===
The Kaiming Press began as an informal bookstore, ran out of a rented house accessed through a Shanghai alleyway and lacking a clear division of labor between writers. It was one of several boutique avant-garde "New Publishing" (新書業; Xīn shūyè) firms founded in Shanghai during the mid-1920s, alongside the Guanghua Press, Beixin Press, and the Crescent Moon Society's Crescent Moon Press (新月書店; Xīnyuè shūdiàn). Many of their early writers and contributors had not written any books previously, but were able to find publication through the press. It was responsible for popularizing many influential authors during the period, including Ba Jin, Ding Ling, and Mao Dun. Kaiming diversified their publications in the years following their founding, moving away from the gender and sexuality focus of the Women's Questions Research Association series.

School textbooks were the most lucrative field of the publishing industry in early 20th century China. However, they typically required very large initial print runs, and entry into the industry required competition with each of the three dominant publishing firms: the Commercial Press, the Zhonghua Book Company, and the World Book Company. Seeking to create a low-cost alternative to the textbooks, he introduced the Kaiming huoye wenxuan (開明活頁文選, abbreviated KHW) in 1927–1928, a series of single-sheet readings for primary and middle schools. Available both as individual sheets or in bound volumes, they were very popular among educators. Zhang purportedly came up with the idea for the sheets after hearing a writer complain about the difficulty of reading mimeographed course materials.

In 1927, Zhang accepted Lin Yutang's offer to compile a three-volume English textbook series in exchange for an advance payment of 300 yuan; upon Zhang Xishan's objections, Zhang Xichen offered to take responsibility for any consequences. The artist Feng Zikai was commissioned to illustrate the series. The Kaiming English Reader, the first in the series, became the most widely used English textbook in China during the 1930s and 1940s, displacing the Commercial Press's Model English Reader. Building off of the firm's early success, Zhang reorganized Kaiming into a joint-stock company in 1929, collecting a capital investment exceeding 50,000 yuan and allowing them to spin off a printing factory as a subsidiary. Du Haisheng was elected to manage Kaiming, while Zhang was appointed to head the publication and circulation divisions.

Seeking a periodical with a broader reader-base than the press's previous journals, Zhang began a monthly magazine aimed at middle school students in January 1930. Entitled The Juvenile Student (中学生; Zhōngxuéshēng; 'Middle School Student'), the periodical included information on art and science alongside guidance intended to help adolescents navigate life. Unlike his previous work with The New Woman, The Juvenile Student featured a much greater emphasis on building relationships with readers through reader submissions and responses. Zhang published a short autobiography titled "From Merchant to Merchant" (Chinese: 從商人到商人; pinyin: Cóng shāngrén dào shāngrén) in its January 1931 issue.

=== Wartime and postwar ===
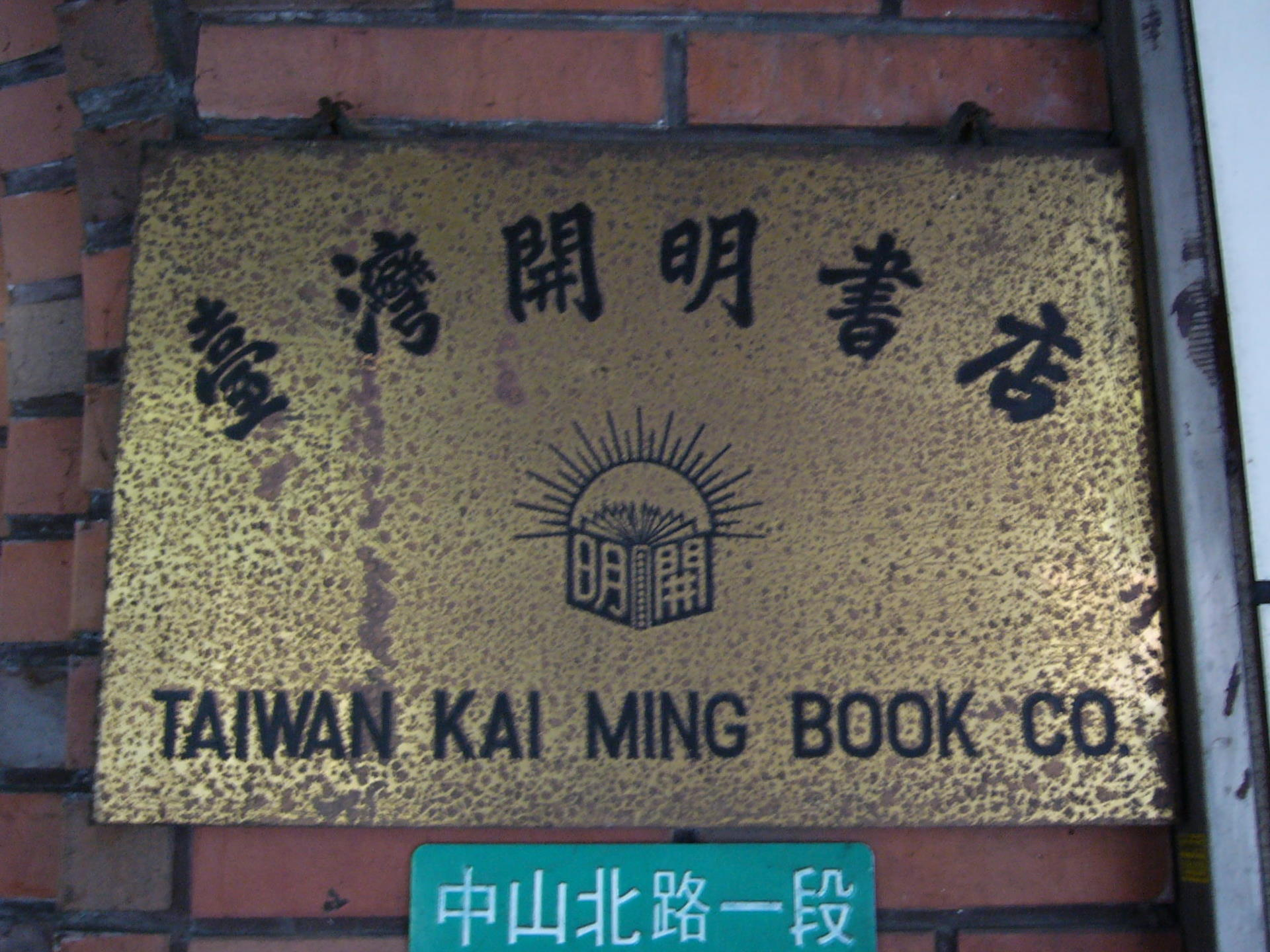
Nameplate and logo of the former Kaiming Taiwan branch, 2010

The Kaiming headquarters were destroyed during the Battle of Shanghai in 1937, following the outbreak of the Second Sino-Japanese War. Together with writer Ye Shengtao, Zhang attempted to restart the press's editorial department inland at Hankou (now part of Wuhan), but the printing equipment was looted by Japanese soldiers during transport. The company was able to reestablish The Juvenile Student in Guilin in May 1939. Zhang was one of a few Kaiming employees who stayed in Shanghai under Japanese occupation. In 1943, he was arrested and held at a Japanese military police station for ten days. Following the end of the war in 1945, the company headquarters returned to Shanghai in February 1946.

Zhang visited Taiwan in 1946, on the invitation of his friend Fan Shoukang, who served as the provincial education director following the island's liberation from Japanese rule the previous year. There, Zhang took over Japanese printing factories and established a Taiwan branch of the company. In 1947, he published a second biographical essay, titled "A Most Ordinary Man".

== Later life and death ==
Even though I shamelessly used my pen to fill my rice bowl for years, I can claim knowledge in neither classical learning nor new learning. Now I have ended up being thoroughly a merchant. How fortunate I am that many writers and scholars mistakenly give me their confidence, taking me as a friend rather than a petty person of commerce.

— Zheng Xichen, A Most Ordinary Man, 1947

Zhang served in a managerial role at Kaiming until the late 1940s, when he entered a conflict with fellow manager and former salt merchant Fan Xiren, who advocated an expansionary policy for the company. The board demanded his resignation in 1949, and he moved with his family to Beijing. He took up a post as the deputy editor-in-chief of the Guji chubanshe ('Classics Press') in 1954, and became the deputy editor-in-chief of the Zhonghua Book Company the following year, although he was demoted after losing political favor during the Anti-Rightist Campaign in 1957.

Zhang attempted to retire in the early 1960s due to a worsening eye disease, but was denied for several years. He was allowed to retire in August 1965. Accused of being a rightist, he was repeatedly harassed during the Cultural Revolution. His house was searched and ransacked by authorities, purportedly leaving only his bed and clothing. His wife died in 1968, and later the same year his eldest son Zhang Shimin died after being beaten and forced out of a hospital by the Cultural Revolution rebels. On 5 June 1969, Zhang Xichen died at a Beijing hospital, suffering from gastrointestinal pain after eating shellfish. He was rehabilitated by the Zhonghua Book Company in 1988, who stated that he was wrongfully proclaimed a rightist. That October, the company held a ceremony to inter his ashes at the Babaoshan Revolutionary Cemetery in Beijing.
