= The Eastern Miscellany =

Chinese newspaper (1904–1952)

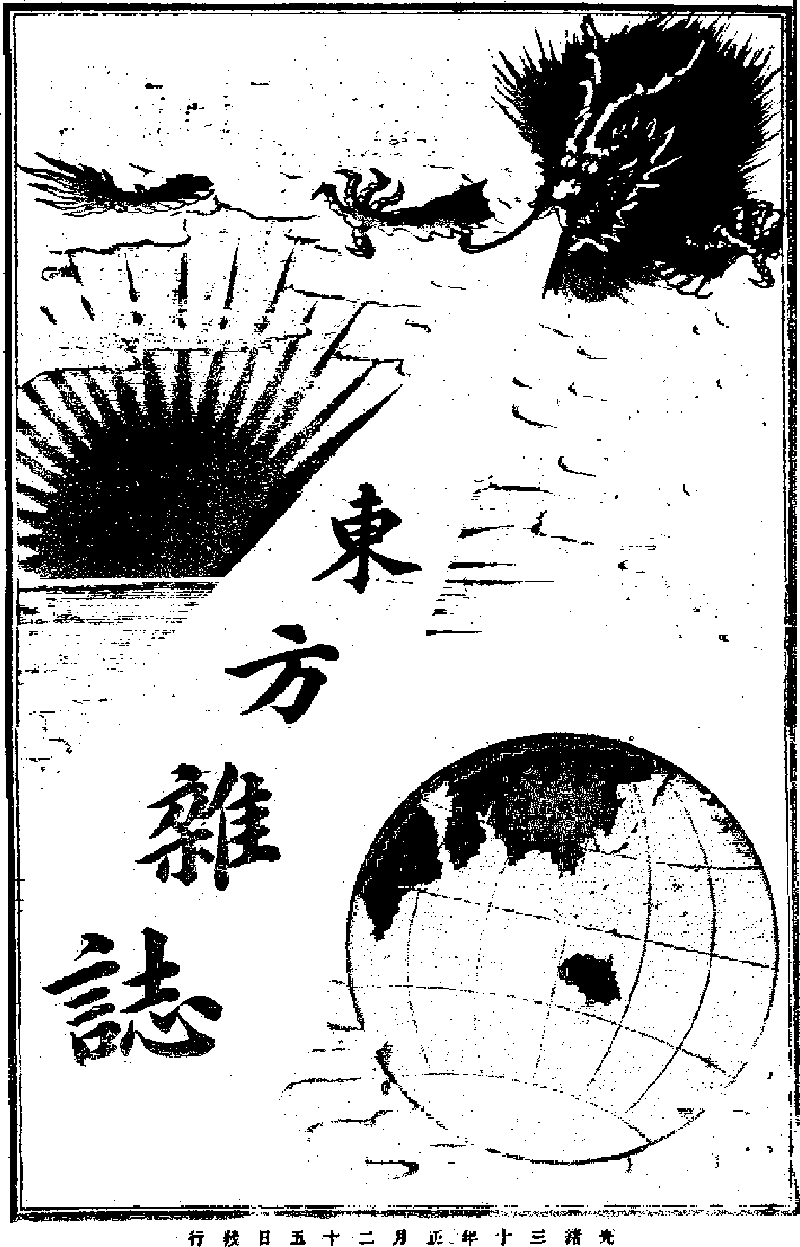
- Cover of Issue 1, 1904
- Native name: 東方雜誌; Dōngfāng zázhì
- Categories: General interest
- Frequency: Monthly (1904–1920); Bimonthly (1920–1948)
- Circulation: 15,000 (1910); 45,000 (1931)
- Publisher: Commercial Press
- First issue: 1904
- Final issue: Mainland: 1948; Taiwan: 1952
- Country: China
- Based in: Shanghai
- Language: Chinese

The Eastern Miscellany (Chinese: 東方雜誌; pinyin: Dōngfāng zázhì) was a Chinese magazine published by the Commercial Press in Shanghai from 1904 to 1948, with a brief revival in Taiwan from 1948 to 1952. One of the press's first periodicals, it grew to have the largest circulation of any Chinese magazine by 1910. It was initially a monthly magazine with content restricted to news reporting with only limited commentary. In May 1911, founding editor Zhang Yuanji handed over editorship to Du Yaquan, who prioritized commentary on political, scientific, and cultural matters, and introduced advertisements, stories, and poetry. Zhang removed Du in 1919 and replaced him with a committee of three editors. Shortly after this, the journal switched to publication twice monthly.

== Publication history ==
In 1897, the Commercial Press was founded in Shanghai by four printers with experience in the Chinese missionary press. They hired editors with public education backgrounds and grew to prominence as a publisher of school textbooks in the first decade of the 1900s, becoming the most prominent publishing house in Shanghai, which itself had emerged as the center of the Chinese publishing industry. The press entered the periodical industry by taking over printing of the Waijiao bao (外交报; 'Diplomatic News') in 1903, which had been co-founded by the educator Cai Yuanpei and Commercial Press chief editor Zhang Yuanji the year prior alongside various other writers. Zhang became one of the most prominent leaders of the company during its first decades.

In late 1903, Commercial Press co-founder Xia Ruifang proposed the creation of a journal similar to the British Review of Reviews or the Japanese Taiyō. Initially named East Asia Journal (東亞雜誌; Dōngyà zázhì), it was renamed The Eastern Miscellany (東方雜誌; Dōngfāng zázhì) to avoid confusion with a similarly-named journal operated by the German consulate in Shanghai.

Beginning publication in January 1904 under Zhang's editorship, it initially focused on reporting news and relaying official announcements, with only limited anonymous commentary. The amount of commentary increased after 1908, but continued to be mainly anonymous. By 1910, it had reached a circulation of 15,000, the widest circulation of any Chinese magazine; however, this was likely only a small portion of its total readership, as copies were often shared among families or friends, read for a small fee at street libraries, or resold. In May 1911, the science educator Du Yaquan took over editorship of the journal and introduced a variety of changes; commentary of political, scientific, and cultural topics was prioritized over strict reporting. Commercial advertisements were added to the journal, as were serialized stories and poetry.

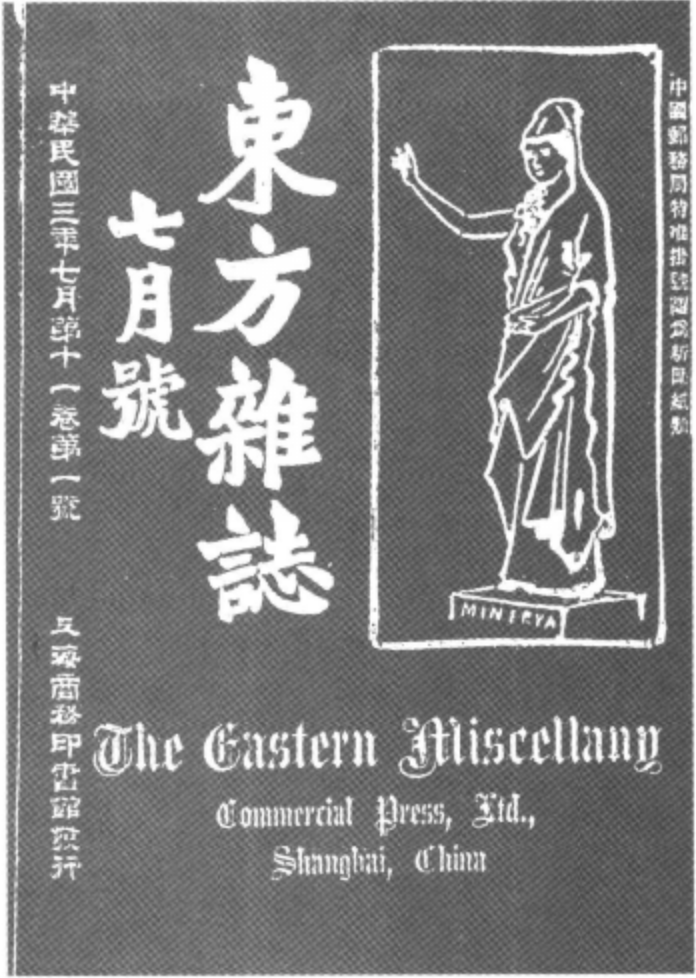
Cover scan of Volume 11, Issue 1 (1914)

Growth for the periodical industry was steady during the early 1910s. Its competitor, the Zhonghua Book Company (which had split from the more conservative Commercial Press during the 1911 Revolution) launched a group of periodicals to compete with the Commercial Press in 1915. Yuan Shikai led a crackdown on the press during his brief attempt to restore the monarchy, leading to a severe downturn in the press market and the end of Zhonghua's competitor journals in 1916–1917. The Eastern Miscellany survived, although poor advertisement revenue continued up through 1919.

Various major Commercial Press periodicals underwent reforms of leadership and structure in 1919, including the Jiaoyu zazhi (教育雜質; 'Education Review') and The Ladies' Journal. Although Zhang, the press's chief editor, was personally more conservative than the moderate Du, he was receptive to complaints from staff writers that Du "really does lean too far toward the old ways". Staff complained that he had rejected a number of promising manuscripts in October 1919. Zhang transferred Du away from the journal and returned him to the press's science section in late October. He chose the staff writer Tao Xingcun as lead editor for The Eastern Miscellany. There appears to have been some conflict between Zhang and Du over the magazine following this, and the latter was demoted and given a pay cut. Although Tao was the ostensible chief editor, The Eastern Miscellany was in practice overseen by a committee consisting of Tao, Qian Zhixiu, and Hu Yuzhi following Du's dismissal. In 1920, the journal began to be published twice a month.

On 30 May 1925, the Shanghai Municipal Police fired on a group of Chinese protestors in the Shanghai International Settlement, sparking the May Thirtieth Movement and a press blackout imposed by the British-dominated Shanghai Municipal Council. The Commercial Press refused to cooperate with the blackout, and published a special edition of The Eastern Miscellany covering the massacre, resulting in a legal battle with the council. Following the 1927 Shanghai massacre, a Kuomintang crackdown on left-wing elements of the party and the Communist Party, various Commercial Press employees were killed, arrested, or forced to flee. Among those arrested were Hu Yuzhi.

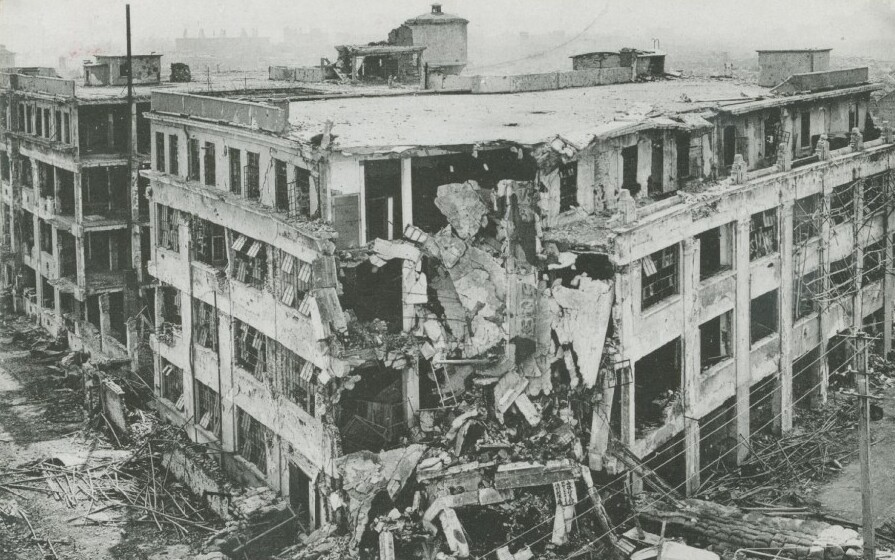
Ruins of the Commercial Press headquarters after the January 28 incident

By 1931, The Eastern Miscellany had reached a circulation of 45,000. The Commercial Press headquarters were destroyed during the 1932 January 28 incident, a month-long battle between Chinese and Japanese forces in Shanghai. Their printing works were bombed and the magazine offices burned to the ground, halting the production of their periodicals. Although other Commercial Press journals were forced to discontinue in the aftermath, the Eastern Miscellany soon returned to publication. It ceased publication on the mainland during the Chinese Civil War in 1948, but was revived the same year in the Nationalist-controlled Taiwan. There it continued publication before ending in 1952.

== Content ==
During the early years of its publication, The Eastern Miscellany was highly supportive of the late Qing reforms and advocated for the creation of a constitutional monarchy along the lines of Japan.
