= Wang Shixiang =

- Born: May 25, 1914; Beijing, China
- Died: November 28, 2009 (aged 95)
- Occupations: Researcher; Collector

Wang Shixiang (May 25, 1914 in Beijing – November 28, 2009) was a Chinese researcher of traditional Chinese culture, leading art collector, poet, and Chinese character calligrapher.

== Life ==
Wang was born into a wealthy Beijing family with ancestral roots in Fuzhou, who were at the Qing dynasty court for three generations. His father was a diplomat. The rich family background contributed to Wang's talent and sensitivity towards classic Chinese culture. From puberty to about age 25, Wang led the life of a dandy. He did not go to school; he loved playing cricket as well as breeding and training pigeons and eagles. His life changed dramatically at the age of 25, when his mother Jin Zhang (artist) died. He dropped the reveler's life and devoted himself to study and writing.

His art collection was an inspiration for craftsmen and scientists worldwide. During the Cultural Revolution (1966–1976), his collection was seized by the Chinese authorities, though after the revolution the collection was returned to him. In 2003 it became part of the Chinese national heritage.

Throughout his life, he remained an avid fan of pigeons. English works, such as Beijing Pigeon Whistles written in 1999, exuded this passion. When he won the Prince Claus Award in 2003 in Beijing, pigeons were released as a gesture to the winner.

=== Career ===
Wang began his career after the Second Sino-Japanese War (1937–1945). During this time, he worked at the Palace Museum in the Forbidden City in Beijing and later became a member of the prestigious Central Research Institute of Culture & History.

During the Cultural Revolution, like most Chinese intellectuals, he was sent down to the countryside; there he cared for pigs and oxen.

Later, he became a researcher for the State Administration of Cultural Heritage. During the 1980s, he made regular contributions to the newspaper China Daily. Through other channels, he published much about the investigation he conducted, as is found in the dozens of books he left behind. His publications are in some cases the only available information on specific topics.

== Work ==
Wang was internationally known for his extensive study of a wide range of cultural relics, artifacts, and manifestations, including: furniture, Chinese lacquer art, bamboo carvings, pigeon whistles, a large number of traditional crafts and music. His knowledge ranged from trivial matters to esoteric, from Chinese manuscripts and objects to intangible cultural affairs.

Altogether, he published over forty books. The book Classic Chinese Furniture: Ming and Early Qing Dynasties is considered his most influential work; the first book about Chinese classical furniture written by a Chinese author. It is a meticulous, precise work that includes all of the studies he made of Chinese classical furniture in over forty years of research, including much consultation with many cabinet-makers. It is dedicated to the paleographer Chen Mengjia, who was his good friend, and a fellow collector of Chinese classical furniture.

=== Bibliography (English Selection) ===
- 1989: Bamboo Carving of China, Wan-go Weng, ISBN 978-0-295-96793-6
- 1990: Connoisseurship of Chinese Furniture: Ming and Early Qing Dynasties, Shih-Hsiang Wang, ISBN 978-962-04-0819-9
- 1991: Classic Chinese Furniture: Ming and Early Qing Dynasties, ISBN 978-1-878529-02-2
- 1993: The Charms of the Gourd, Shixiang Wang, ISBN 978-962-577-004-8
- 1995: Masterpieces from the Museum of Classical Furnitures, Shih-Hsiang Wang & Curtis Evarts, ISBN 978-1-883662-02-8
- 1998: Classical and Vernacular Chinese Furniture in the Living Environment, Kai-Yin Lo, ISBN 978-1-878529-47-3
- 1999: Beijing Pigeon Whistles, Shixiang Wang, ISBN 978-7-5382-5636-9
- 2000: Beyond the Screen: Chinese Furniture of the 16th and 17th, Craig Clunas & Malcolm Rogers, ISBN 978-0-87846-434-0
- 2000: RulesCraft Qing Dynasty, Part 1 (ISBN 7534723965) and 2 (ISBN 7534723973)

== Awards ==
In 1985, Wang won an award from the Chinese Ministry of Culture where he was described as one of the most distinguished individuals in the fields of culture, tradition and history, and museum studies.

As well as his 1985 award, Wang received the 2003 Prince Claus Award in recognition for his meticulous research into popular culture and decorative arts of the People's Republic of China. With his knowledge of traditions and skills, he contributed to the recovery from the dislocation caused by the Cultural Revolution by preserving and transferring the Chinese cultural heritage to current and future generations. Usually, the main prizes of the Prince Claus Prize are awarded in the Netherlands. In 2003, with Wang at 89 years of age, the awards were organized by the embassy in Beijing.

== Literature ==
- Chen Zhou (2002) Biography Wang Shixiang, ISBN 7-5010-1322-5
