= Jin Zhang (artist) =

Chinese painter and calligrapher

- 金章
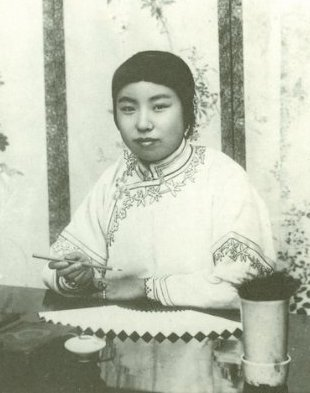
- Jin Zhang in her Nanxun studio, 1906.
- Born: 1884; Nanxun, China
- Died: 1939 (aged 54–55); Beijing, China
- Education: McTyeire School
- Known for: Bird-and-flower painting Chinese calligraphy Silk painting
- Children: Wang Shixiang

Jin Zhang (Chinese: 金章; pinyin: Jǐn Zhāng) (1884–1939) was a painter, calligrapher, and art instructor active during China's Republican era. Her name is occasionally listed as Jin Taotao (金陶陶),, her art name, though Jin Zhang is how she is most commonly known in the historical record.

== Biography ==
Jin Zhang was born in 1884 in the town of Nanxun in China to a prominent silk merchant family. Her grandfather founded a successful silk business that her father, Jin Dao, was able to expand internationally. His openness to foreign ideas led to his children growing up alongside popular Western inventions like microscopy, phonography, and the camera. Jin Zhang had several brothers and sisters, one of whom became Republican cultural leader Jin Cheng (1878–1926). One of her younger brothers, Jin Shaoji, co-founded the Peking Laboratory of Natural History in 1925 with American Amadeus William Grabau.

=== Education ===
As they came from what was considered a wealthy family, Jin Zhang and her siblings were privately tutored throughout their childhoods in subjects like calligraphy, painting, and the Confucian classics. In a move that was highly unusual for the time, Jin Zhang's parents insisted that all of their children receive high quality educations both domestically and internationally. Public education for girls was not sanctioned in the region until 1907 when Jin Zhang was twenty-three, so she likely would not have received an education without her parents' unique interference.

Zhang attended the McTyeire High School for Girls, established by the American Southern Methodist Episcopal Mission in Shanghai, from 1898 until 1902. After leaving public education she was sent with her three brothers to study in London for several years between 1902 and 1905. She did not enroll in an educational institution, opting instead to be tutored by a private English family. Though she had three sisters – Jin Lan, Jin Ce, and Jin Jian – Jin Zhang was the only daughter ever sent to study abroad, a possible reflection of her father's belief in her talent. Due to the wide range of education she received, Jin Zhang was fluent in both English and French in addition to her native Chinese.

=== Adulthood ===
As a reflection of both her artistic talent and the respect she had earned from her family, Jin Zhang was asked to create the calligraphy for her grandfather's epitaph. Such an honor was traditionally restricted to male relatives or friends of the deceased.

Jin Zhang married Wang Jizeng (1882–1955) in 1909 when she was twenty-five. She and her husband briefly lived in Paris, France for several years in the early 1910s, where he worked in education. The pair hosted her brother Jin Cheng on his 1910–1911 diplomatic trip to Paris on behalf of China. The couple had at least two children: a son named Wang Shirong who was born in 1912 but died prior to 1920, and a son named Wang Shixiang who was born on 25 May 1914. Inspired by his parents, Shixiang would eventually become a well known researcher and art collector. In 1999, he authored a 116-page book on his mother's life and artistic career titled Jin Zhang: The Joy of Goldfish.

=== Death ===
Jin Zhang died suddenly in 1939, at the age of 54. Her death was especially difficult for her son Wang Shixiang, who completely changed the course of his life as a result of the loss of his mother. While he had not attended school from puberty to the age of twenty-five, he suddenly devoted his life to art and study in 1939 and eventually became a respected authored of numerous books on subjects like Chinese furniture and pigeon whistles.

== Boston port entry incident ==
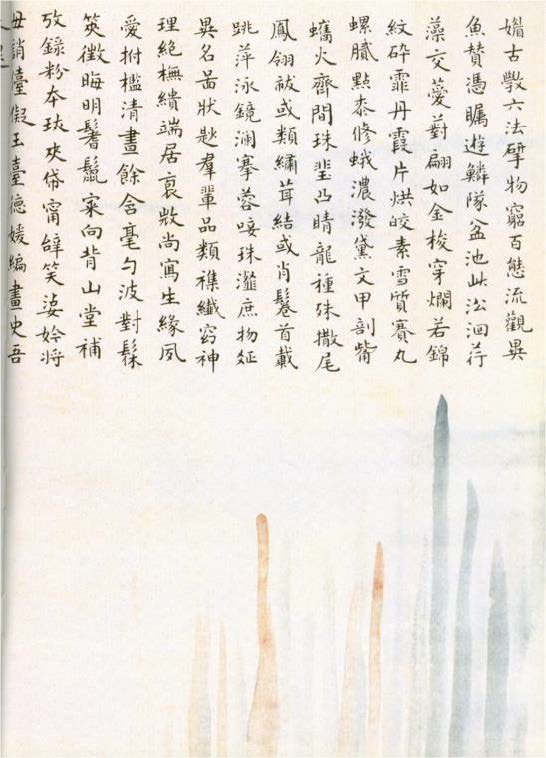
One hundred images of goldfish colophon, Chinese calligraphy, 1909.

Jin Zhang and her three brothers returned to China in 1905 after receiving their educations in London, traveling first class aboard the ocean liner RMS Ivernia. The first nine days of the trip from Liverpool to Boston were uneventful and the siblings made friends with many of the other passengers. They planned on meeting several of their school friends in Boston to visit Niagara Falls before making the rest of the journey to China. However, when the ship arrived in Boston, the quartet was barred from entry into the United States even though they possessed all required passports and were even able to present a prepared letter of introduction written by then-United States ambassador to the United Kingdom Joseph Hodges Choate. The incident and the United States Government's response was recorded in a 1906 publication titled Compilation from the records of the Bureau of Immigration of facts concerning the encorcement of the Chinese-exclusion laws. The Bureau of Immigration placed all of the blame for the incident of the Jin siblings, claiming they had failed to acquire an obscure certificate needed for entry.

Even though the Chinese Exclusion Act of 1882 was intended to only prevent the immigration and travel of Chinese laborers and intentionally excluded students and travelers from restrictions, individual immigration officials were ultimately given the power to decide who did and did not enter the United States. The officials in Boston not only initially denied the Jin siblings entry, but they also deliberately humiliated them much to the anger of their friends and fellow passengers. Jin Zhang was singled out for ridicule by officials who blamed the attention on her, for "wearing her native costume." The siblings were eventually permitted to enter the country once they each sat for three official photographs and paid a US$500 bond, the 2020 equivalent of more than US$58,000.

=== Media ===
Jin Zhang and her brothers soon joined a growing number of Chinese individuals mobilizing against the United States' Chinese Exclusion Act. They used the press to their advantage, giving dozens of interviews to both English and Chinese newspapers. The siblings did not disagree entirely with the original legislation, and instead used their position as elites to separate themselves from laborers. This sentiment was echoed in many of their interviews, for example:

"It is rather exasperating to us to be detained there after all the other passengers have gone ashore...I can understand why the United States may desire to keep out Chinese labor from the country, but I do not see why it would discriminate against tourists and those who come merely in transit. In many cities in China the middle classes of Chinamen are boycotting American goods, buying English or European products instead, because of the manner in which they are treated in this country."

— Jin Cheng, The Boston Globe, June 2, 1906

The incident was reported on by English newspapers published across the United States like the Boston Herald, the Lowell Sun, The Sun (New York City), the San Francisco Chronicle, the Chicago Daily Tribune, the Indiana Evening Gazette, and The Washington Post. The latter of which included a plea by the article's author to end the mistreatment of Chinese individuals, declaring "We are not, as a nation, so lost to all sense of decency that we do not feel ashamed when Chinese gentlemen are gratuitously insulted by out immigration officials." In China, the incident was shared on posters, postcards, and pamphlets, including one titled Tonga shounue ji (A Record of Abuses Suffered by Our Compatriots). Many Chinese newspapers also reported on what happened to Jin Zhang and her brothers, including Shen bao and The North-China Herald.

=== Resolution ===
Facing public pressure, President Theodore Roosevelt publicly denounced the treatment of the Jin siblings in June 1905 and called for immigration officials to relax their "harshness," and avoid "all unnecessary inconvenience and annoyance" in dealing with those who were exempt from the restrictions. He also called for the end of requiring exempted Chinese travelers to provide photographs, something the Jins had firmly protested against. The immigration officials involved with the incident were fired, as Roosevelt said that they "had exhibited regrettable acts of discrimination" following the "barbarous practices" of the Bureau of Immigration.

On 24 June 1905, the United States Department of Commerce and Labor announced new regulations for Chinese citizens transiting through the country. When asked, the inspector general of the department conceded that the case of the Jin siblings was responsible for the changes. The new regulation was written as follows: "No Chinese person who shall satisfy the officer in charge that he belongs to one of the exempt classes (although not supplied with the certificate provided for by section 6 of the act of July 5, 1884) or, if not of an exempt class, that he is not a laborer shall be required to comply with [regulations] to submit photographs of themselves, and to be measured according to the Bertillon system of identification."

== Career ==
Jin Zhang returned to several themes repeatedly throughout the four decades of her career: fish, birds, flowers, and other plant life. She was especially skilled at painting aquatic plants and goldfish, two of her favorite subjects. Her paintings blended traditional Chinese painting styles and techniques with the realism and detail of Western art that she was exposed to as a child. Additionally, she became a highly respected art instructor while working with several of Beijing's art societies.

=== Painting ===
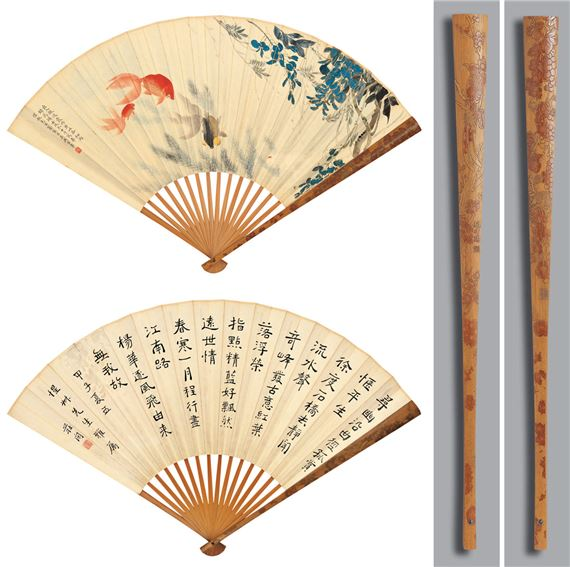
Goldfish, ink and color on paper, 1922.

Jin began her artistic career painting traditional hand fans when she was a teenager. The earliest surviving example of her painted fans is dated 1903, completed when she was nineteen. Her fans often featured hand drawn calligraphy alongside delicate, colorful paintings of flowers, fish, birds, and insects. Her illustrations became progressively more detailed and intricate as she continued to paint fans for several more decades.

Jin Zhang began painting on silk soon after she started painting on paper hand fans. For four decades, she painted dozens of large hanging scrolls with botanical scenes, landscapes, underwater illustrations, and flying birds. Many of her paintings were accompanied by her hand drawn calligraphy of calendars or popular songs and poems. She was especially noted for her traditional bird-and-flower paintings, known as huaniaohua.

=== Publications ===
As did many of her contemporaries, Jin Zhang arranged for several of her painting to grace the covers of magazines and publications. Her work was most commonly featured on the covers of women's magazines and of publications from organizations she was involved with, like the Chinese Painting Research Society and the Lake Society. One of her bird-and-flower paintings was featured on the cover of volume 2, issue 8 of The Ladies' Journal, published in August 1916.

In 1918, Jin Zhang and one of China's first female doctors, Ida Kahn, were each invited to submit an article on the state of womanhood in China to the English-language newspaper Peking Leader (Beijing daobao). The newspaper operated for a short time in Beijing between 1918 and 1919 with the tagline "a morning daily advocating liberal opinions in China." Zhang's article was part of a larger collection of articles on the state of affairs in China on a variety of fronts in 1918, and the collection was translated and published in several Chinese language publications. Jin Zhang used her article to discuss women's education, philanthropy, and livelihoods, in addition to more specific topics like traditional foot-binding. She also offered her thoughts on how continue to improve conditions for women and girls, while insisting that such progress needn't be too hasty. While encouraging progress for women, she stressed the prioritization of femininity, obedience, and motherhood.

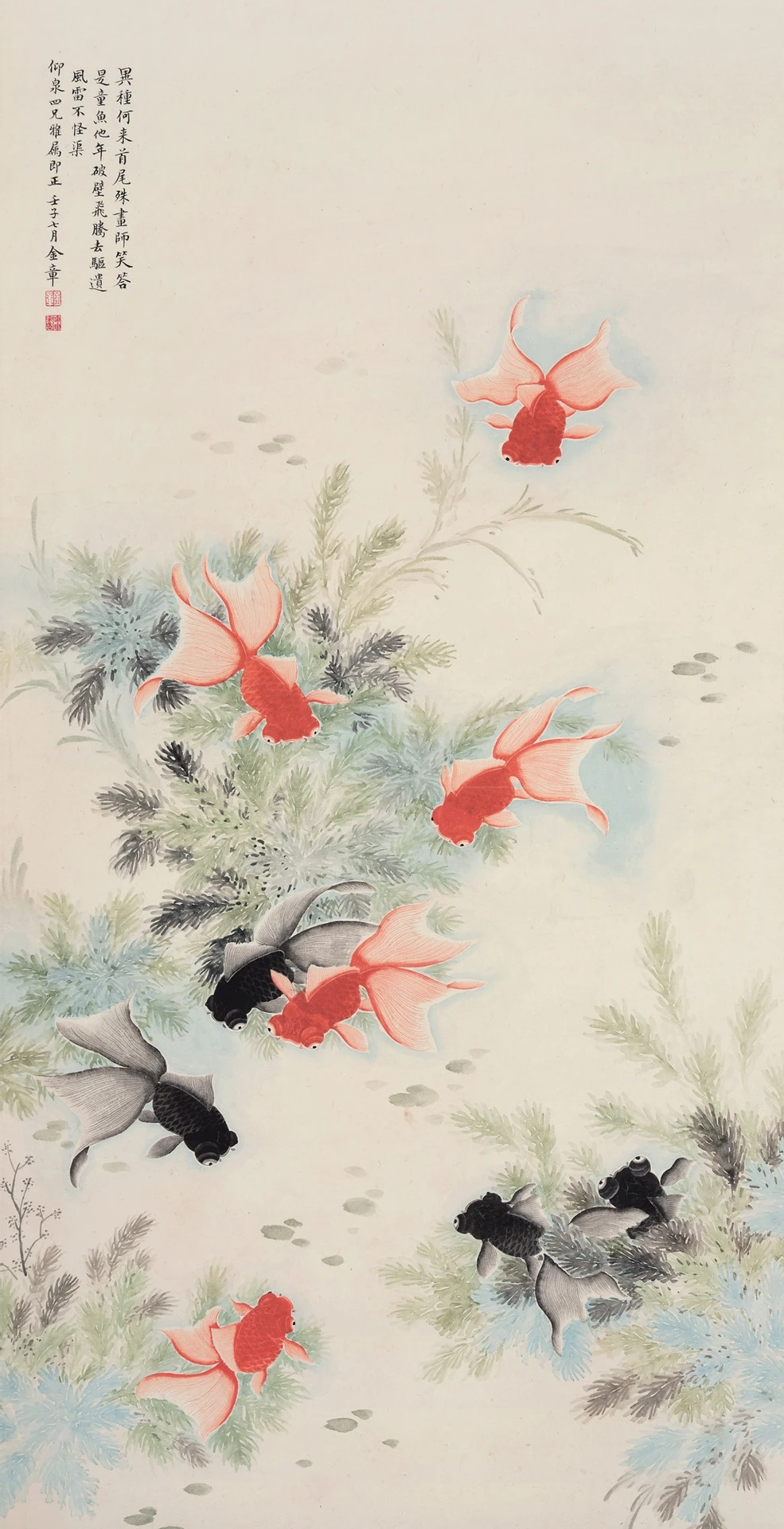
Fishes, ink and color on silk, 1912.

Jin Zhang published a four volume manual on the art of painting fish titled Haoliang zhileji in 1922, and it was reprinted over sixty years later in 1986. It was only intended to be a student's manual, but it is now the only known comprehensive treatise on the Chinese tradition of painting fish. She also published a volume of illustrations of cicadas accompanied by poetry written by Hou Rucheng in 1934. The book featured commentary from over dozen individuals including Zhu Ziqing, Shen Yinmo, Liu Yazi, Yu Pingbo, and Xu Shiying.

=== Organizations ===
Jin Zhang was very active in China's art societies and cohorts, and consequently became friends with many other artists who were active at the time. The organizations she was heavily involved in focused on activities like exhibitions, publishing, research, philanthropy, education, and women's rights. Zhang was especially close to artist Wu Shujuan, despite being both from a different social class and nearly three decades younger than her. The pair were part of a group of artists active in the late Qing and Republican periods known as nüshi shuhuajia, or "female scholar-painters," who revitalized traditional styles of Chinese painting and calligraphy with more modern ideas.

The Chinese Painting Research Society (CPRS) was established during a meeting of more than thirty artists held at the Shidazi temple in Beijing on 30 May 1920. The CPRS' stated purpose was to carry out "careful research on ancient methods and make broad acquisitions of new knowledge." The group met five to seven times a month to study and attempt to replicate the work of a particular master of traditional Chinese art, and Jin Zhang served as one of the group's first instructors. She was one of several professional artists who were responsible for giving weekly lectures and instruction to students, in addition to researching and selecting the art for every meeting. The CPRS was eventually endorsed by then President Xu Shichang, so the group held significant influence in Beijing's art world.

=== Exhibitions ===
- International Exhibition of Art, Rome, 1911.
- Exposition Internationale de Liege, Belgium, 1930.
  - Awarded an individual silver medal.
- Sino-Japanese Exhibition, Beijing, Shanghai, and Tokyo, 1921–1931.

== Gallery ==
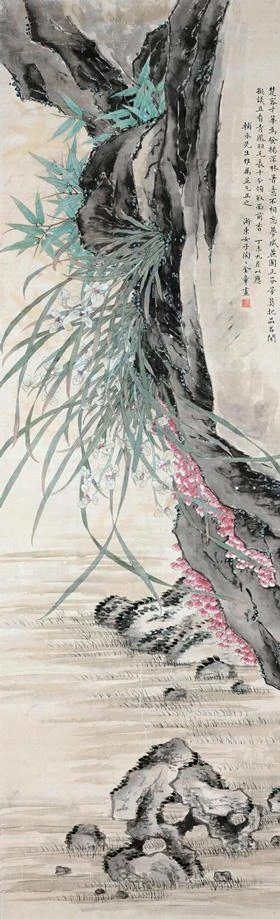
Orchid by the Rock, ink and color on paper, 1907.

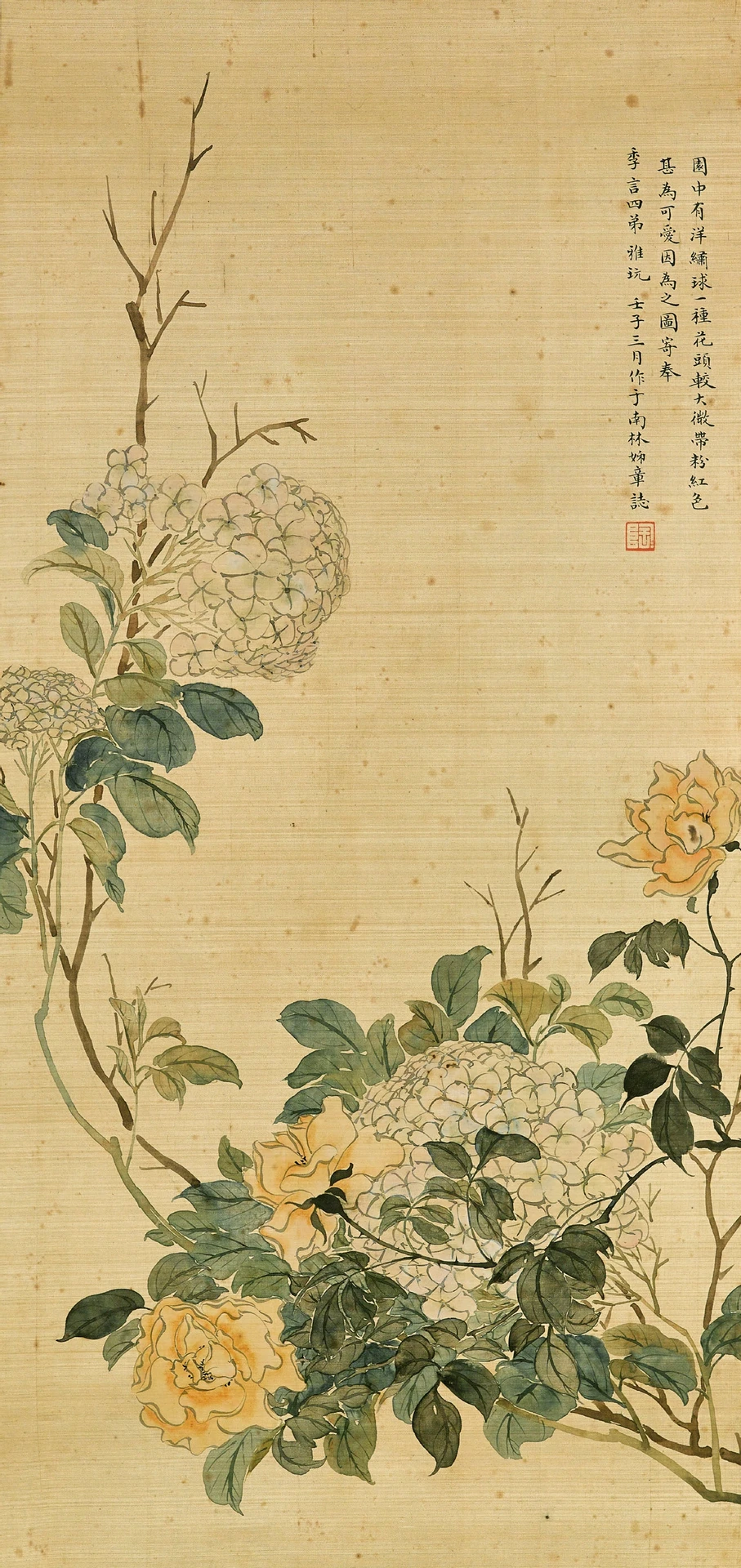
Roses and Hydrangea, ink and color on silk scroll, 1912.

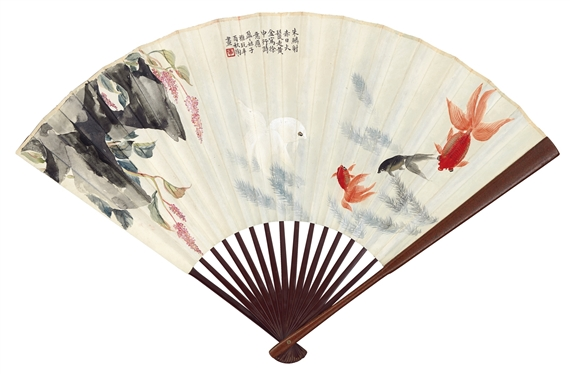
Goldfishes in the Pond, ink and color on paper, 1921.

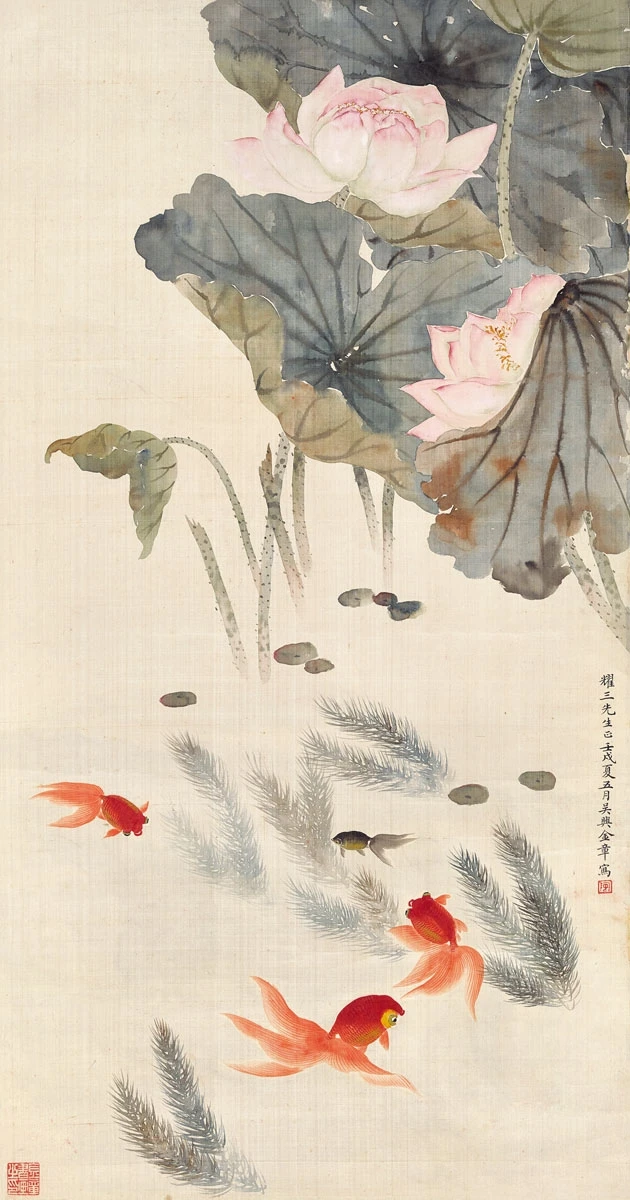
Goldfish in Lotus Pond, ink and color on silk, 1922.

== Collections ==
Artwork by Jin Zhang is held by numerous private collectors as it regularly appears at art auctions in London, New York City, and Hong Kong. As of 2022, her most expensive artwork to appear at auction was an untitled hand fan that sold in Hong Kong for the equivalent of more than US$40,000 in 2010. Her work is also held in the collections of museums and public institutions all over the world, including the following:

- Goldfish and Lotus, ink and color on paper, c. 1920, Palace Museum, Beijing, China.
- Flowers and Fishes, ink and color on silk, c. 1920, Metropolitan Museum of Art, New York City, United States.
- Kingfisher and Lotus, ink and color on silk, c. 1920, Metropolitan Museum of Art, New York City, United States.
- Haoliang zhileji, painting manual, 1922, The Spencer Art Reference Library at Nelson-Atkins Museum of Art, Kansas City, United States.
- 金章: 金魚百影 (Jin Zhang: The Joy of Goldfish), illustrated biography, 1999, Smithsonian Libraries and Archives, Washington, D.C., United States.
- National Library of Australia, Canberra, Australia.
