= Jiaoyu zazhi =

Chinese education magazine (1909–1948)

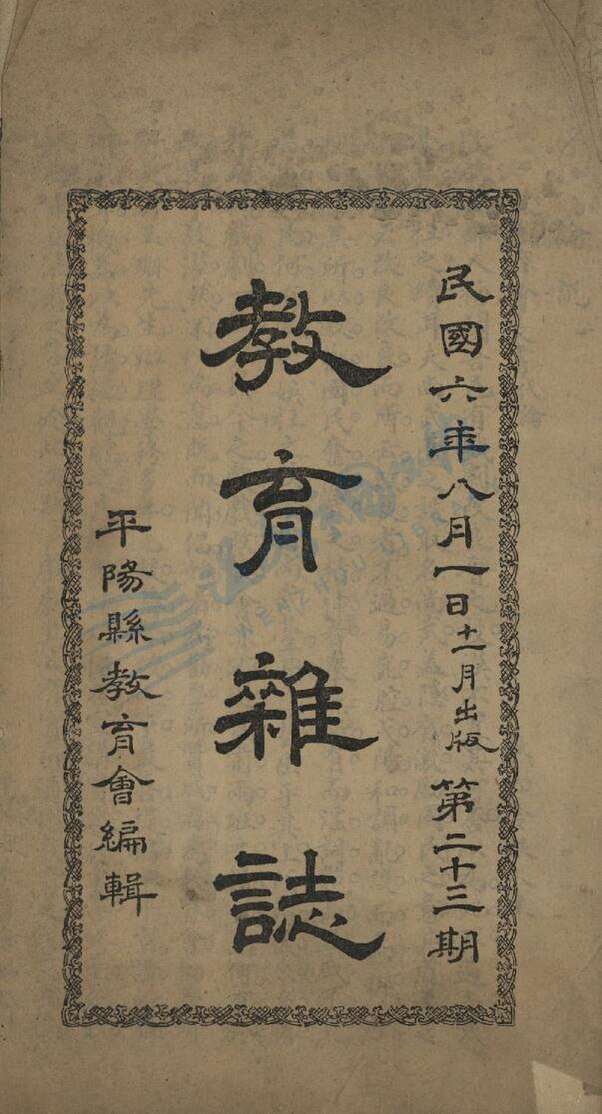
- Cover of the journal's 23rd issue, 1911
- Categories: Education
- Frequency: Monthly
- Publisher: Commercial Press
- Founder: Lufei Kui
- First issue: February 1909
- Final issue: December 1948
- Country: China
- Language: Chinese
- OCLC: 57133890

Jiaoyu zazhi (Chinese: 教育雜誌; pinyin: Jiàoyù zázhì; lit. 'Education Magazine'), also known as the Chinese Educational Review, was a monthly education magazine published by the Commercial Press from 1909 to 1948, with interruptions in 1932–1934 and 1942–1947.

== History ==
The Commercial Press, one of China's preeminent publishers of the early 20th century, began producing magazines soon after its founding in Shanghai in 1897. It took over publication of its first magazine, Diplomatic News (外交報; Wàijiāo bào), in 1902. Two years later, it founded The Eastern Miscellany (東方雜誌; Dōngfāng zázhì), which became the most widely circulated magazine in China by the end of the decade.

The first issue of the monthly education magazine Jiaoyu zazhi was published on 15 February 1909; due to a leap month in the traditional Chinese lunar calendar, it published 13 issues in its initial 1909 volume. The linguist and educator Lufei Kui served as its first editor-in-chief, and was likely the one to initially propose that the press publish an education magazine. Most of its issues ranged from 50,000 to 60,000 words in length, although some special issues exceeded 200,000 words. The magazine's circulation peaked at around 50,000 copies per issue, although print runs of bound volumes could exceed 200,000 copies. The Commercial Press' distribution network allowed for the magazine to circulate across China, as well as Hong Kong and Singapore.

In January 1932, the Commercial Press headquarters were destroyed by Japanese bombing in the January 28 incident. This halted the production of the Commercial Press' periodicals, including Jiaoyu zazhi. It resumed publication in September 1934. It was again suspended in December 1941, but returned to publication from July 1947 to December 1948.

== Legacy ==
Jiaoyu zazhi was the longest-lasting educational magazine in China during the early 20th century, publishing 385 issues over 33 yearly volumes. Due to this, it is also the largest Chinese education magazine by word count, exceeding 35 million words over its full run. Most other education periodicals were short-lived, running for only a few years, although Jiaoyu zazhi's competitor Chung-hwa Educational Review (中華教育界; 'Chinese Education Circle') ran for 28 years.

== Notes ==
=== Works cited ===
- Andrews, Julia F. (2018). "Persuading with Pictures: Cover Art and The Ladies' Journal (1915–1931)". In Hockx, Michel; Judge, Joan; Mittler, Barbara (eds.). Women and the Periodical Press in China's Long Twentieth Century: A Space of Their Own?. Cambridge University Press. pp. 21–56. doi:10.1017/9781108304085. ISBN 9781108304085.
- Reed, Christopher A. (2004). Gutenberg in Shanghai: Chinese Print Capitalism, 1876–1937. University of British Columbia Press. ISBN 9780774810418.
- Wang, Youliang (2012). 《教育杂志》与近代教育考论 ['Education Magazine': A Study of Modern Education] (in Chinese). China Minzu University Press. ISBN 9787566002501.
