= Du Yaquan =

Qing dynasty scholar and translator

- Born: Du Weisun; September 14, 1873; Cangtang Township, Shanyin County, Shaoxing Prefecture, Zhejiang, Qing dynasty
- Died: December 6, 1933 (aged 60); Shaoxing County, Zhejiang Province, Republic of China
- Occupation: Scholar

Du Yaquan (in Chinese: 杜亚泉, 1873 - December 6, 1933), originally named Weisun (炜孙), courtesy name Qiufan (秋帆), pseudonym Yaquan (亚泉), also signed as Cangfu (伧父) was an encyclopedic scholar and a pioneer in advocating and disseminating science in early 20th-century China, translating a large number of Western and Japanese scientific works and literature into Chinese. In his later years, he participated in the compilation of numerous textbooks. He was from Cangtang Township, Shanyin County, Shaoxing Prefecture, Zhejiang (now part of Changtang Town, Shangyu City). During the May Fourth Movement and the New Culture Movement, he was a leading figure of the Oriental Culture School, advocating for the reconciliation of Eastern and Western cultures, promoting pluralistic, moderate, and gradual enlightenment ideals, and engaging in heated literary debates with Chen Duxiu and others who criticized Confucianism and traditional Chinese morality.

== Biography ==
=== Early life ===
As a young boy, Du studied diligently on his own and, at the age of 16 in the 15th year of the Guangxu era (1889), passed the imperial examination to become a xiucai (licentiate). After the First Sino-Japanese War in 1894, he abandoned the imperial examination system and turned to studying natural sciences, attending Chongwen Academy. He independently studied subjects such as mathematics, physics, chemistry, botany, zoology, and mineralogy. In 1898, at the invitation of Cai Yuanpei, he became a mathematics teacher at Shaoxing Chinese-Western School. In 1900, he moved to Shanghai and changed his name to Yaquan. He explained: "Yaquan is an abbreviation for argon and line; argon is the most inert element in the air, and a line in geometry is a form without surface or substance. I chose this name to signify that I am an unassuming and inconspicuous person." Subsequently, he used this name to found a private science and technology institution, the Yaquan Academy, and launched the semi-monthly Yaquan Magazine, which primarily published articles on mathematics, physics, and chemistry, with a particular emphasis on chemistry. The magazine was the first in China to introduce Mendeleev's periodic trends and frequently reported new achievements in chemistry by scientists worldwide, providing Chinese names for several chemical elements, some of which are still in use today. It played a significant role in the dissemination and development of chemical science in China. Yaquan Magazine is widely recognized by the scientific community as the earliest modern science magazine in China. However, it ceased publication due to insufficient funding. In 1902, he established the General Academic Office and the General Academic Journal, which, in addition to natural science sections, included social science sections such as philosophy, law, history, and literature. He also edited the innovative textbook Introduction to Literature, one of China's earliest Chinese language textbooks. This book disregarded Qing dynasty regulations, breaking away from the traditional "Three Hundred Thousand" (Three Character Classic, Hundred Family Surnames, Thousand Character Classic) and Four Books and Five Classics, introducing a method that followed linguistic patterns to guide learning progressively from concrete to abstract, making education more practical. It abandoned classical Confucian education, setting modern education on the right path. In 1903, he returned to Shaoxing and co-founded Yuejun Public School. The General Academic Office later faced financial difficulties. In the autumn of 1904, at the invitation of Xia Ruifang and Zhang Yuanji, he joined the Compilation Department of Commercial Press as head of the Science Department, where he worked for 28 years, compiling or overseeing the compilation of hundreds of science textbooks for primary and secondary schools and scientific works.

=== Shift in Thought ===
In his early years, Du was immersed in Western natural sciences and enamored with Western culture. However, after World War I, he was shocked by reality, leading to a significant shift in his thinking. He realized that blind worship of the West was unwise and began to reassess China's traditional culture, advocating for the use of Chinese traditional culture to complement the shortcomings of Western culture. In 1911, he began serving concurrently as editor-in-chief of The Eastern Magazine. Over the next nine years until the end of 1919, using the pseudonyms "Cangfu" and "Gaolao," he wrote approximately 300 essays, commentaries, and translations covering topics such as philosophy, politics, economics, law, diplomacy, culture, ethics, and education. These contributions made the magazine a significant publication in the early Republic of China. His articles were grounded in reality, offering sharp criticism and practical suggestions that were farsighted. For example, in the article "The New Life of China," he wrote:

All civilized nations today rely on the middle class as the center of power, and China in the future will not be an exception. This is something we deeply believe in.

His political commentaries often provided unique insights, inspiring readers. However, his thinking was relatively conservative, with a deep attachment to outdated moral concepts, and he proposed some rigid ideas. For instance, he believed that the introduction of Western theories had destroyed China's "national civilization" and standards of right and wrong, leading to "the loss of national affairs, spiritual bankruptcy, and confusion of the human heart." He was deeply opposed to the ideas of individual independence, human rights equality, academic independence, and freedom of thought promoted by New Youth magazine, even attacking the promotion of new culture as importing "scarlet fever and syphilis" and describing Western "isms and doctrines" as "hoping for the devil to lead us to paradise. Devil, devil, may you perish quickly!". (Note: Original quote: “主义主张，是犹望魔鬼之接引以人天堂。魔鬼乎，魔鬼乎，汝其速灭！”) His intense resentment is evident.

Writing in 1917 in Dongfang zazhi (Eastern Miscellany), Du contended that World War I had revealed existential problems in the Western countries which symbolized the end of old civilizations and the creation of new ones. Du believed that after the war, the peoples and societies of the world would begin an era of reform and change.

=== New Culture Movement ===
During the New Culture Movement, Du belonged to the Oriental Culture School, defending Chinese traditional culture. He adhered to rational conservatism, advocating for a balanced and harmonious integration of Chinese and Western cultures. He engaged in a cultural debate, known as the East-West Culture Debate, with the New Culture School, represented by Chen Duxiu, which advocated for complete Westernization and the total rejection of Chinese traditional culture. This was a major debate between The Eastern Miscellany and New Youth. He criticized the radical tendencies of Westernization and anti-traditionalism, arguing that Eastern and Western cultures each had distinct characteristics, differing in form rather than degree, and proposed a pluralistic view of culture. In articles such as "Dynamic Civilization and Static Civilization" and "The Reconciliation of Eastern and Western Civilizations Post-War," he suggested adopting an approach of "reconciling East and West" and "compromising between old and new," using Chinese traditional culture to integrate and harmonize Western culture. His most representative statement was:

Western fragmented civilization is like scattered coins on the ground, and our country's inherent civilization is the rope that strings them together.

This emphasized the central role of tradition in the integration of modern civilization. Chen Duxiu linked this "integration" issue to restoration, questioning in New Youth the error of treating the "inherent civilization" of the monarchical era as an unshakable "national foundation" and viewing "loyalty to the monarch, patriarchal ethics, and moral codes" as immutable doctrines while rejecting modern "Western civilization." He also defended utilitarianism, exposing the hypocrisy of feudal ethics in opposing it. Several debates followed, ending when Du fell silent. In reality, the Commercial Press authorities, concerned that clashing with the mainstream anti-traditional thought would harm the press's reputation, advised Du to stop responding and decided to replace him as editor-in-chief of The Eastern Miscellany. Du was forced to resign from the editorship at the end of 1919, concluding the debate. Both sides were, in fact, striving to find ways to save the nation and its people, albeit representing different factions.

=== Later years ===
In 1932, the Commercial Press and his residence were destroyed in the "January 28 Incident." He temporarily left Shanghai to return to his hometown, where, over the course of more than a year, he completed his final work, the 700,000-characters Elementary Natural Science Dictionary. While compiling it, he also gave biweekly lectures voluntarily at Jishan High School (later renamed Shaoxing Second High School). In the autumn of 1933, he contracted pleurisy. Having no savings, he could not afford treatment as his condition worsened. Even in illness, he continued to reflect on his career and the issues he cared about deeply. One night, overwhelmed by excessive thinking, he could not sleep, and the next day his condition deteriorated rapidly, leading to his death on December 6. Du Yaquan had typically donated all his earnings from writing, beyond simple living expenses, to educational and public welfare causes, leaving him destitute with no inheritance. He was buried in a borrowed coffin. Six months before his death, he had said, "Devoting oneself entirely is a common thing; even plants and animals do so, let alone humans," a true reflection of his life.

== Influence ==
Du Yaquan was an encyclopedic enlightenment scholar in modern China. Yaquan Magazine introduced modern global political, economic, and cultural academic trends to the public. During his tenure at the Commercial Press, works such as the Latest Science Textbook and the Latest Arithmetic Textbook were among China's earliest science textbooks. He edited the Botany Dictionary, Zoology Dictionary, and Elementary Natural Science Dictionary, all of which were pioneering in China. To promote the development of Chinese science, in addition to publishing various science textbooks, Du also emphasized the manufacture of scientific experimental instruments and equipment. At his initiative, the Commercial Press established a specimen and instrument training class to cultivate talents capable of producing instruments, specimens, and models, and he personally taught in the class. Additionally, he encouraged and funded his younger relatives to open factories for producing instruments and stationery. For example, he supported his cousin Zhou Rongxian in opening the China Instrument Factory in Shanghai (now under the Ministry of Geology as the Shanghai Geological Instrument Factory) and his cousin Du Chunfan in opening the "Natural Ink Factory" in Shanghai for ink production.

In 1996, Changtang High School in Du Yaquan's hometown, Changtang Town, Shangyu City, was officially renamed Du Yaquan High School.

== Works ==
Due to his extensive engagement in various fields of knowledge, Du Yaquan's writings are numerous and cannot be fully listed. The most famous are the Great Dictionary of Zoology (Note: Original title: 动物学大辞典 (Dòngwùxué Dà Cídiǎn)) and the Great Dictionary of Botany, (Note: Original title: 植物学大辞典 (Zhíwùxué Dà Cídiǎn)) considered monumental works in Chinese science, credited with introducing binomial nomenclature in biological taxonomy to China for the first time.

- Great Dictionary of Botany

China's first influential specialized dictionary, compiled by a team of thirteen with Du as editor-in-chief. Begun in 1907, it took 12 years to publish and was reissued in 1934. It includes 8,980 Chinese plant name terms, 5,880 Western scientific name terms, 4,170 Japanese kana-annotated plant names, and 1,002 plant illustrations, totaling over 3 million words. Cai Yuanpei wrote in the preface: "Among the scientific dictionaries recently published in our country, none surpasses this in detail and comprehensiveness." The then head of the biology department at Soochow University in Suzhou, commented: "With the creation of this book, we now have a reliable basis for Chinese and Western plant names, serving as a guide."

- Zoology Dictionary

Compiled by a team of five with Du as editor-in-chief. Begun in 1917, it took 6 years to publish, reaching its fourth edition in 1927. The book, over 2.5 million words, includes terms with annotations in English, German, Latin, and Japanese, richly illustrated with images, and features an animal distribution map, an overview of the animal kingdom, and indices in Western languages, Japanese kana, and four-corner code.

- Chemical Technology Treasure

First published in March 1917, it reached its ninth edition by December 1929. It covers over 30 categories and more than 1,000 chemical processes, from household uses to industrial manufacturing, including alloys, gold plating, metallurgy, glass, enamel, artificial gems, ceramic coloring, matches, paints, inks, bleaching, preservation, soaps, poisons, and antidotes, with detailed explanations. It aimed to provide technical reference materials for domestic manufacturers.

- Elementary Natural Science Dictionary

Contains over 2,000 entries across 23 categories, including astronomy, meteorology, physics, chemistry, mineralogy, medicine, botany, zoology, chemical engineering, architecture, agriculture, and food.

- Comparative Table of Chinese and Foreign Weights, Measures, and Currencies
- Secondary School Botany Textbook
- Latest Secondary School Mineralogy Textbook
- Philosophy of Living (translated)
- Experimental Botany Textbook (translated)
- New Chemistry Textbook
- Republic Textbook: Botany
- Republic Textbook: New Science Teaching Methods
- Republic Textbook: Physiology
- Republic Textbook: Zoology
- Botany
- New Science Textbook
- Newly Compiled Botany Textbook
- Mineralogy Lecture Notes
- New Physics Textbook
- Secondary School Textbook: Organic Chemistry
- Lower Plant Taxonomy
- General History: With Music and Game Scores
- Annotations on the Regulations of Provincial Consultative Assemblies
- Elementary Natural Science Teaching Methods
- Republic Textbook: Mineralogy
- New Curriculum Junior High School Textbook: Natural Science
- New Curriculum Natural Science Textbook
- Newly Compiled Natural Science Textbook
- Higher Plant Taxonomy
- Food and Hygiene (translated)
- Secondary School Physiology Textbook
- Preliminary Lecture Notes on Natural History
