= The Red Detachment of Women (1970 film) =

- Directed by: Pan Wenzhan (潘文展); Fu Jie (傅杰)
- Starring: Xue Jinghua
- Cinematography: Li Wenhua (李文化)
- Music by: Liu Shida (刘士达)
- Production company: Beijing Film Studio
- Release date: 1970
- Running time: 105 minutes
- Country: China
- Language: Mandarin

The Red Detachment of Women (Chinese: 红色娘子军; pinyin: Hóngsè Niángzǐjūn) is a 1970 Chinese filmed performance of the Chinese ballet of the same name (originally produced in 1964) – which itself was an adaptation of director Xie Jin's original 1961 film. The style is called 'yangbanxi' (revolutionary model dramas). It is one of eight approved revolutionary model dramas made during the Cultural Revolution. The film was screened at the 32nd Venice International Film Festival, marking the first time a Chinese film was presented at Venice. A Beijing Opera version was filmed by the August First Film Studio in 1972.

== Plot ==
In the 1930s, on Hainan Island, the heroine, Wu Qinghua, escapes from Nan Batian, an evil landlord, and becomes the leader of a women's militia, under the guidance of Hong Changqing, a Communist Party secretary.

== Cast ==
- Xue Jinghua as Wu Qinghua
- Liu Qingtang as Hong Changqing
- Song Chen as Company Commander
- Li Xinying as Xiao Pang, the Messenger
- Li Chengxiang as Nan Batian, the Tyrant
- Wan Qiwu as Ou Guangsi, Nan Batian's lackey

== Production ==
The China Ballet Troupe standardized the script in May 1970 for the ballet based on the 1961 film, described as a "revolutionary dance-drama". This script was itself adapted for film a few months later, and sought to act as "part of the broader drive toward popularizing the model works and expanding their role as everyday guides for political morality."

== Release ==
The film was screened at the 32nd Venice International Film Festival, with the request for entry from Peking immediately accepted. This news upset a group of left-wing Italian filmmakers who had protested the government's appointment of Gian Luigi Rondi, critic for the Christian Democratic Rome daily Il Tempo, as the director.

== Reception ==
In 1972, Jean de Baroncelli wrote an article for Le Monde regarding the simultaneous release of three Chinese films: Building the Nanjing Yangtze River Bridge, Tunnel Warfare, and The Red Detachment of Women. He wrote that these films were created for a Chinese audience and could not be critiqued in the same way as conventional films: "Born not of an aesthetic, but of a new ethic, they strictly adhere to Mao Zedong’s directive that revolutionary art must 'help the masses move history forward.'" He considered these films interesting—not from an artistic standpoint, but for the insight they provide into the China in which they were produced.

de Baroncelli found both the ballet and the film to be technically well-executed, though he described the final result as highly "academic." He characterized the music as sounding as if it had been "composed by a mediocre student of Shostakovich during the 'Zhdanovist' era."

=== Legacy ===
In 1974, Jean Yanne directed a satirical film, Les Chinois à Paris ("The Chinese in Paris"). It includes a sequence featuring a "proletarian opera" titled Carmeng, which serves as a caricature of The Red Detachment of Women.

== World Events ==
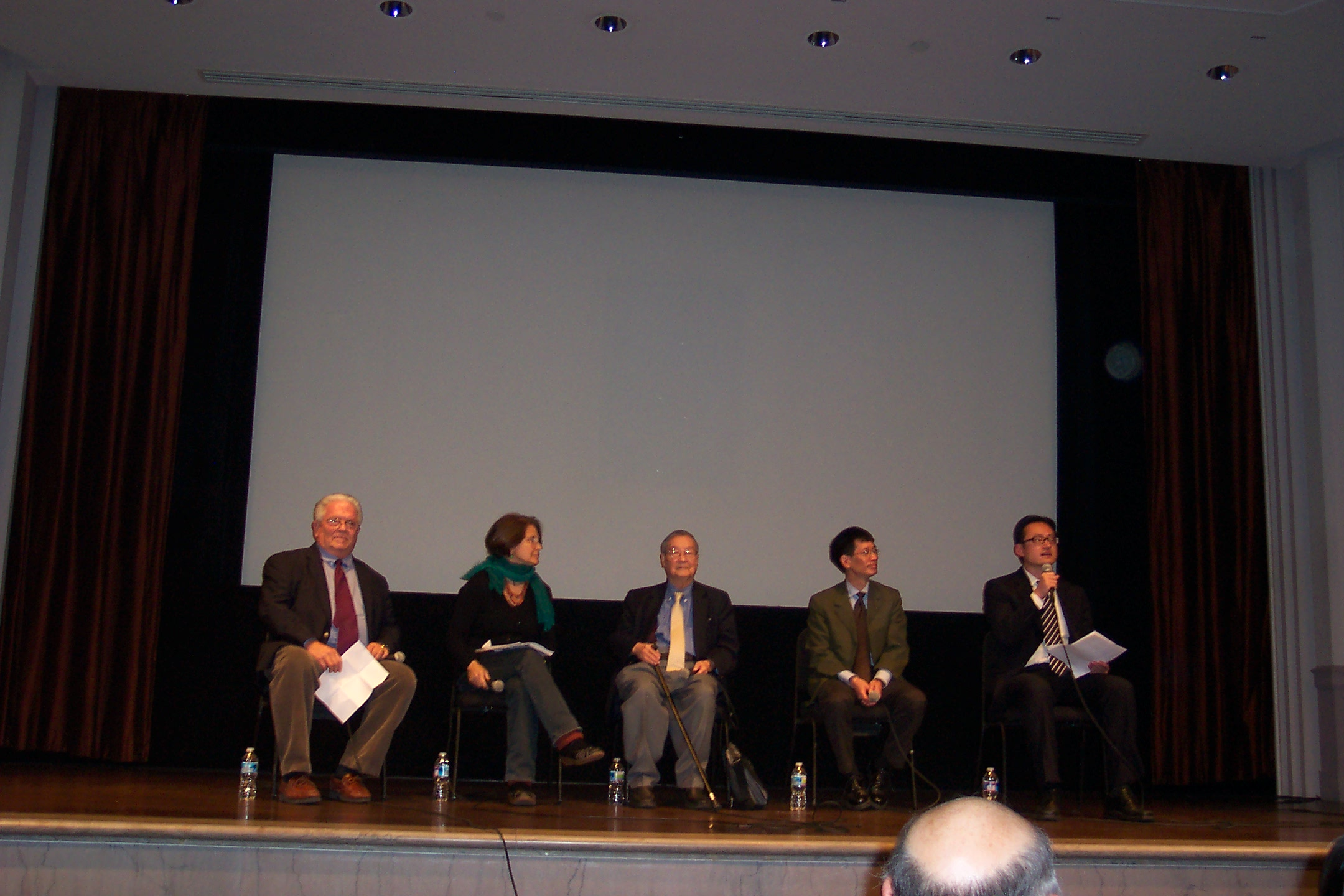
Panel discussion on The Red Detachment of Women on 11 November 2012 at Freer Gallery; (left to right) Chas W. Freeman, Dr. Carma Hinton, Dr. Chi Wang, Dr. Michael Chang, and moderator.

On 11 November 2012, in Washington, D.C., a panel discussion with Ambassador Chas W. Freeman, Chi Wang, Carma Hinton, and Michael Chang discussed the effect this film had on the Cultural Revolution and on Chinese film.

== Sources ==
- China Movie Material Institute, ed. (1981). 中国艺术影片编目 (1949-1979) [China Art Film Catalog (1949-1979)] (in Chinese). Beijing: Culture and Arts Press.
