= Red Detachment of Women =

Red Detachment of Women may refer to:

- The Red Detachment of Women (1961 film), a film directed by Xie Jin, based on a novel and well-known Chinese revolutionary themes
- Red Detachment of Women (ballet), a Chinese ballet (based on the 1961 film) which premiered in 1964
- The Red Detachment of Women (1970 film), a filmed performance of the ballet
