= Bai Shuxiang =

Chinese ballet dancer

- Born: 1939 (age 86–87); Leiyang, Hunan, China
- Education: Beijing Dance School
- Occupation: Ballerina
- Years active: 1958-1980s
- Organization: National Ballet of China (originally Central Ballet Ensemble)
- Known for: Early pioneer of Chinese ballet
- Notable work: Swan Lake; Red Detachment of Women

Bai Shuxiang (Chinese: 白淑湘; pinyin: Bái Shūxiāng; born 1939) is a Chinese dancer and former prima ballerina, known for her role in the early development of professional ballet in China. After training at the Beijing Dance School as a teenager, Bai was appointed principal dancer of the newly formed Central Ballet Ensemble in 1958, becoming the first Chinese dancer to perform the role of Swan Queen in Swan Lake.

In 1964, Bai danced the lead role in Red Detachment of Women, premiering a new "revolutionary model" of contemporary Chinese ballet, and proceeded to dance in a number of other Chinese productions. During the Cultural Revolution, her career came to an abrupt halt when she was publicly denounced by a former dance partner and sentenced to several years of hard labour. Despite this, Bai returned to the stage in the late 1970s; she found new success dancing her old roles, and eventually became associate director of the Central Ballet.

== Early life ==
Bai Shuxiang was born in 1939 in Leiyang, Hunan Province. As a young teenager, she won a prize for her performance as part of a local children's theatre troupe, and in 1954 she began training in ballet at the Beijing Dance School. Bai was one of the earliest Chinese dancers to study ballet formally.

== Career ==
In 1958, Bai was made principal dancer of the newly formed Central Ballet Ensemble and was cast as Odette and Odile in Swan Lake, becoming the first Chinese dancer to perform the role of Swan Queen. After the performance, her artistic director and choreographer Pyotr Gusev told Bai, "You are an artist now." She subsequently danced roles in Giselle (Myrtha), The Fountain of Bakhchisarai (Zarema), and The Hunchback of Notre Dame (Gudule).

On October 1, 1964, the Central Ballet premiered Red Detachment of Women, with Bai in the lead role opposite Liu Qingtang. Based on an opera of the same name, the performance was the first Chinese ballet with a "revolutionary model", mixing Chinese and Western artistic styles to express a contemporary political message. Bai went on to dance the lead in other Chinese ballets such as Hymn to Yimeng, Azalea Mountain, and Recalling Beloved Premier Zhou.

During the Cultural Revolution, Bai was publicly denounced by her former dance partner Liu and subsequently sentenced to complete eight years of hard labour for "being out of political step." From 1966 to 1973, Bai worked on a "labour reform camp" tending to farm animals in Changping county. Returning to the Central Ballet afterwards, Bai again danced the lead roles in Swan Lake, Giselle and Les Sylphides, and was met with popular reception from audiences. In 1980 she danced at the Philippines International Ballet Festival, where her group received first prize for ensemble performance. She travelled throughout several Asian countries and the United States, and later participated in a study tour in France. By 1986, Bai had become associate director of the Central Ballet.

Bai received the award of First Grade Dancer of the Nation. She has been Director of the Chinese Dancers' Association and executive director of the Minorities Foundation. During the 1980s, she was a member of the Chinese People's Political Consultative Conference.
