= 1st Hundred Flowers Awards =

Chinese film awards ceremony in 1962

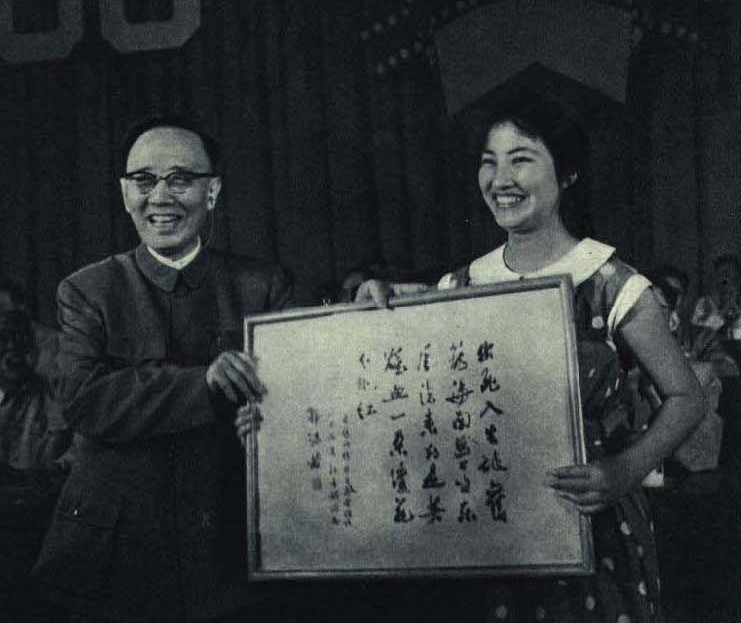
In 1962, Guo Moruo presented an award to the best actress Zhu Xijuan at the first Hundred Flowers Chinese Movie Awards.

The 1st Popular Film Hundred Flowers Award is a mass award given by the Chinese Film Workers' Association (the predecessor of the Chinese Filmmakers' Association) in recognition of the outstanding films produced in mainland China during the 1960-1961 period. It was voted by the readers of Popular Film, with a total of more than 110,000 ballots, and the awarding ceremony was held on May 22, 1962, in the CPPCC National Committee Auditorium (Chinese: 全国政协礼堂) in Beijing, China. It was hosted by Tian Fang, then vice chairman of the China Film Workers' Association, and awarded by Guo Moruo, chairman of the China Federation of Literary and Artistic Associations, with inscriptions for the winners by Chen Yi, Guo Moruo, Mao Dun, Lao She and others.

== Awards ==
=== Best Film ===
Winner	Winning film	Nominees
N/A	The Red Detachment of Women	N/A

=== Best Director ===
Winner	Winning film	Nominees
Xie Jin	The Red Detachment of Women	N/A

=== Best Screenplay ===
Winner	Winning film	Nominees
Xia Yan; Shui Hua	A Revolutionary Family	N/A

=== Best Actor ===
Winner	Winning film	Nominees
Cui Wei	Keep Red Flage Flying	N/A

=== Best Actress ===
Winner	Winning film	Nominees
Zhu Xijuan	The Red Detachment of Women	N/A

=== Best Supporting Actor ===
Winner	Winning film	Nominees
Chen Qiang	The Red Detachment of Women	N/A

=== Best Animation ===
Winning film	Nominees
Baby Tadpoles Look for Their Mother	N/A

=== Best Chinese Opera Film ===
Winning film	Nominees
Hero Yang	N/A
