= 32nd Venice International Film Festival =

Italian film festival in 1971

- Location: Venice, Italy
- Founded: 1932
- Festival date: 25 August – 6 September 1971
- Website: Website

Venice Film Festival chronology
- 33rd 31st

The 32nd annual Venice International Film Festival was held from 25 August to 6 September 1971.

There was no jury because from 1969 to 1979 the festival was not competitive. John Ford, Marcel Carné and Ingmar Bergman were awarded with the Career Golden Lion.

== Official Selections ==
The following films were selected to be screened:

=== Main selection ===
| English title | Original title | Director(s) | Production country |
|---|---|---|---|
| Anna | | Jörn Donner | Finland |
| The Arp Statue | | Alan Sekers | United Kingdom |
| The Beginning | Начало | Gleb Panfilov | Soviet Union |
| Beware of a Holy Whore | Warnung vor einer heiligen Nutte | Rainer Werner Fassbinder | West Germany |
| The Big Mess | Der große Verhau | Alexander Kluge | RFA |
| The Cow | گاو | Dariush Mehrjui | Iran |
| Dead Aim | Arde baby, arde | José Bolaños | Mexico |
| Dear Irene | Kære Irene | Christian Braad Thomsen | Denmark |
| The Devils | | Ken Russell | United Kingdom |
| Early Morning | Le petit matin | Jean-Gabriel Albicocco | France |
| Fortune and Men's Eyes | | Harvey Hart | United States, Canada |
| The Guest | L'ospite | Liliana Cavani | Italy |
| Horizon | Horizont | Pál Gábor | Hungary |
| In the Summertime | Durante l'estate | Ermanno Olmi | Italy |
| The Last Movie | | Dennis Hopper | United States |
| Lenz | | George Moorse | West Germany |
| Liberxina 90 | | Carlos Durán | Spain |
| Love Is as Beautiful as Love | Liebe, so schön wie Liebe | Klaus Lemke | West Germany |
| M comme Mathieu | | Jean-François Adam | France |
| The Nightcomers | | Michael Winner | United Kingdom |
| La piazza vuota | | Beppe Recchia | Italy |
| Il potere | | Augusto Tretti | Italy |
| Pratidwandi | | Satyajit Ray | India |
| The Role of My Family in the Revolution | Uloga moje porodice u svjetskoj revoluciji | Bahrudin Čengić | Yugoslavia |
| Smic Smac Smoc | | Claude Lelouch | France |
| Sunday Bloody Sunday | | John Schlesinger | United Kingdom |
| The Third Part of the Night | Trzecia czesc nocy | Andrzej Zulawski | Poland |
| The Tricky Game of Love | Hry lásky sálivé | Jiří Krejčík | Czechoslovakia |
| La vacanza | | Tinto Brass | Italy |
| Vagabond Humor | L'humeur vagabonde | Édouard Luntz | France |
| Who Is Harry Kellerman and Why Is He Saying Those Terrible Things About Me? | | Ulu Grosbard | United States |
| Y que patatín, y que patatán | | Mario Sábato | Argentina |
| You Can't Hold Back Spring | On n'arrête pas le printemps | René Gilson | France |

=== Informativa ===
| English title | Original title | Director(s) | Production country |
|---|---|---|---|
| Dodes'ka-den | どですかでん | Akira Kurosawa | Japan |
| The Red Detachment of Women | 红色娘子军 | Xue Jinghua | China |
| Spring | Le Printemps | Marcel Hanoun | France |
| Uski Roti | | Mani Kaul | India |

=== Special screenings ===
| English title | Original title | Director(s) | Production country |
Tribute to Dylan Thomas
| Under Milk Wood | | Andrew Sinclair | United Kingdom |
Tribute to Ingmar Bergman
| The Touch | Beröringen | Ingmar Bergman | Sweden, United States |
Tribute to John Ford
| Directed by John Ford | | Peter Bogdanovich | United States |
Tribute to Marcel Carné
| Law Breakers | Les assassins de l'ordre | Marcel Carné | France, Italy |

== Official Awards ==
=== Career Golden Lion ===
- John Ford
- Marcel Carné
- Ingmar Bergman

== Independent Awards ==
=== FIPRESCI Prize ===
- The Cow by Dariush Mehrjui

=== Pasinetti Award ===
- Best Foreign Film: The Devils by Ken Russell
- Best Italian Film: La vacanza by Tinto Brass

=== CIDALC Award ===
- The Last Movie by Dennis Hopper

=== Golden Rudder ===
- The Guest by Liliana Cavani
