= Bridge (1949 film) =

- Traditional Chinese: 橋
- Simplified Chinese: 桥
- Hanyu Pinyin: Qiáo
- Directed by: Wang Bin
- Written by: Yu Min
- Starring: Chen Qiang; Wang Jiayi
- Production company: Northeast Film Studio
- Release date: 1949
- Country: China
- Language: Mandarin

Bridge (simplified Chinese: 桥; traditional Chinese: 橋; pinyin: Qiáo) (also known as The Bridge) is a 1949 Chinese war film made shortly after the Chinese Communist Revolution; as such, it is considered the first feature film completed after the founding of the People's Republic of China. As a film, Bridge set many of the themes that would dominate the Socialist cinema of post-1949 China, including the glorification of the worker and the conversion of the intellectual to Communism.

== Plot ==
During the Chinese Civil War, a railroad factory is commissioned by the People's Liberation Army to repair a bridge. Led by a skeptical engineer who does not believe the bridge can be completed in time, the factory workers lack enthusiasm and morale. The project is galvanized, however, by the work of Liang Ruisheng (Wang Jiayi), who inspires his fellow workers to complete the project for the war effort. In the process, even the engineer is converted.
