= Huang Zhun (composer) =

Chinese composer (1926–2024)

- Huang Zhun, c. 1950
- Traditional Chinese: 黃準
- Simplified Chinese: 黄准
Transcriptions
Standard Mandarin
- Hanyu Pinyin: Huáng Zhǔn

Huang Zhun (25 June 1926 – 3 December 2024) was a Chinese composer known for film scores.

== Life and career ==
Huang Zhun was born in Huangyan, Zhejiang. She studied in the drama department of Lu Xun Academy of Fine Arts, graduating in 1944, and studied composition with Xian Xinghai. She performed as a mezzo-soprano from 1941 to 1942. She worked in the Dalian Art Work Group in 1946. Later, she worked in Northeast Film Studio and Beijing Film Studio, and then in 1949 took a position as a composer and later as a music director for Shanghai Film Studio where she worked until 1987. She has composed many films such as Long Live Youth and Red Detachment of Women.

Her first film composition was produced in 1947 by the Northeast Film Studio for the first feature film in the Liberated Areas, "Leaving him to fight Lao Jiang". She also completed the theme song "The Army Loves the People, The People Love the Army" in 1948. This song became very popular in the northeast region of China. After that, she moved to work in Beijing Film Studio and Shanghai Film Studio as a composer, where she later wrote the musical score for dozens of films, such as Family and Woman Basketball Player No. 5. In particular, she composed the score for the film Red Detachment of Women. This work had a very big influence at the time. After this, her composition of the theme song "The Fishing Kittens" won the National Children's Song Award. She composed more than two hundred songs throughout her life, one of them, "The Teacher", won the first prize of the 2nd National Children's Song Award. Another, "Years Gone By", won the National Youth Favorite Song's third prize.

Huang died on 3 December 2024, at the age of 98.

== Honors and awards ==
- 20th Century Masterpiece of Chinese Music 1989 for Red Detachment of Women theme song
- 50th Anniversary of Chinese TV and Film Music Prize, 1999
- The theme song "The Fishing Kittens" won the National Children's Song Award.

== Works ==
Huang Zhun composed over 40 film scores, including:

- Old Man and Nymph, 1956
- Red Detachment of Women, 1960
- Two Sisters on Stage, 1964
- Special Task, 1978
- Meeting Ceremony, 1980
- Strange Marriage, 1981
- Horsekeeper, 1982
- Wrangler, 1982
- Little Goldfish, 1982
- The Last Choice, 1983
- Deal Under the Noose, 1985
- Gourmet, 1985

She published books including:

- Selected Songs of Huang Zhun
- Life and Melodies
- Music and My Life
