= In the Summertime (film) =

1971 drama film

- Directed by: Ermanno Olmi
- Screenplay by: Ermanno Olmi; Fortunato Pasqualino
- Produced by: Gaspare Palumbo
- Starring: Renato Paracchi; Rosanna Callegari
- Cinematography: Ermanno Olmi
- Edited by: Ermanno Olmi; Maria Enrica Siena
- Music by: Bruno Lauzi
- Release date: 1971
- Language: Italian

In the Summertime (Italian: Durante l'estate) is a 1971 Italian romantic drama film co-written and directed by Ermanno Olmi. It premiered in competition at the 32nd edition of the Venice Film Festival.

== Cast ==
- Renato Paracchi as The Heraldist
- Rosanna Callegari as The Princess
- Mario Barillà
- Gabriele Fontanesi
- Mario Cazzaniga
- Carlo Pozzi

== Production ==
The film was produced by RAI, with Palumbo Film serving as co-producer. It was mainly shot in Milan. The cast mostly consisted on non-professional actors.

== Release ==
The film had its premiere at the 32nd Venice International Film Festival, in the main competition section.

== Reception ==
Morando Morandini described the film as "an overly explicit parable", and wrote: "Here, [...] realism is not [effectively] blended with the fabulous; it feels as though Olmi focused too much on the message [of the film] and not enough with how to give it shape". Similarly, Leo Pastelli from La Stampa referred to it as "so tasteful in its framing, [but] not very secure in its tone, which combines, without fusing them, the realistic or even the veristic (with its relative slowness) with the fabulous". A contemporary Variety review noted: "In The Summertime, even as a minor Olmi work, again reflects the film author's unmistakeable leaning toward tenderness and sensitivity in searching for positive qualities of man's condition in a world prone to cynicism and destructive violence".
