= M comme Mathieu =

1971 drama film

- Directed by: Jean-François Adam
- Screenplay by: Jean-François Adam
- Produced by: Bob Zagury
- Starring: Sami Frey; Brigitte Fossey
- Cinematography: Pierre Lhomme
- Edited by: Éric Pluet
- Music by: Antoine Duhamel
- Release date: 1971
- Language: French

M comme Mathieu ('M as in Mathieu') is a 1971 French romantic drama film written and directed by Jean-François Adam, in his directorial debut. It premiered at the 32nd edition of the Venice Film Festival. It was released in French cinemas in April 1973.

== Cast ==
- Sami Frey as Mathieu
- Brigitte Fossey as Jeanne / Murielle
- Roland Dubillard as the neighbour
- Bulle Ogier as the student
- Laurent Douieb as the child
