= Chen Qiang (actor) =

Chinese actor

- 陈强
- Born: Chen Qingsan (陈庆三); 1918; Xujiahe Township, Ningjin County, Zhili, China
- Died: 26 June 2012 (aged 93–94); Beijing, China
- Education: Lu Xun Academy of Arts
- Occupations: Actor, comedian
- Years active: 1950–2001
- Notable work: The Red Detachment of Women; The White Haired Girl; Devils on the Doorstep
- Political party: Chinese Communist Party
- Children: 3, including Chen Peisi

Chinese name
- Traditional Chinese: 陳強
- Simplified Chinese: 陈强
Transcriptions
Standard Mandarin
- Hanyu Pinyin: Chén Qiáng

Chen Qingsan
- Traditional Chinese: 陳慶三
- Simplified Chinese: 陈庆三
Transcriptions
Standard Mandarin
- Hanyu Pinyin: Chén Qìngsān

Chen Qiang (Chinese: 陈强; 1918 – 26 June 2012) was a Chinese film and stage actor and comedian best known for his performances as villains/antagonists in The Red Detachment of Women, The White Haired Girl and Devils on the Doorstep. Chen began his career as an actor in 1947 and has played more than 40 different characters since then.

His second son, Chen Peisi, is also a well-known actor and comedian.

== Biography ==
Chen was born Chen Qingsan (陈庆三; 陳慶三) to a poor family in Xujiahe Township of Ningjin County, in Hebei province. When he was a child, he relocated to Taiyuan, Shanxi with his parents. In 1936, he attended Taiyuan Youth Theatre and Xinsheng Theatre; both were progressive groups organized by the Chinese Communist Party. In 1938, he went to Yan'an to study acting at Lu Xun Academy of Arts. After graduating in 1939 he joined the Song and Dance Troupe of Shanxi-Chahaer-Hebei Border Region.

Chen joined the Chinese Communist Party in 1942, and made his comedy debut in The Second Uncle.

In 1945, he was cast as Huang Shiren, the despotic landlord, in the ballet play The White Haired Girl. His performance was so convincing, that an emotionally invested soldier in the audience almost shot him with a rifle in anger.

In 1947, he was an actor in Dongbei Film Studio, that same year, he participated in Leave Him to Fight Jiang.

In 1949, after the founding of the Communist State, he appeared as Lao Houtou, an old worker in The Bridge, which is the first feature film in the People's Republic. He also played as Yang Mingqing in The White Warrior.

He was transferred to Beijing Film Studio in 1953. At the same year, he appeared in the film Marriage.

In 1958 he starred in two films, He Beauty in the Picture and No Mystery Three Years Ago. And he had a supporting role in the film A Visit to Relatives.

In 1961, he starred as Nan Batian in Xie Jin's film The Red Detachment of Women, which earned him a Best Supporting Actor Award at the 1st Hundred Flowers Awards and a Best Actor Award at the 3rd Asian - African Film Festival, in Indonesia, 1964.

In 1982, Chen Qiang co-starred with his son Chen Peisi in Sunset Street.

In 1986, he played the lead role as Laokui in the comedy film Father and Son.

In 1995, he won the Best Supporting Actor Award at the 13th Golden Eagle Awards for his performance in When Something Amazing Happens.

On September 13, 2008, Chen won the Lifetime Achievement Award at the 29th Hundred Flowers Awards.

Chen played One-stroke Liu in Devils on the Doorstep, the would-be executioner and legendary swordsman, who in fact is merely a crazy old man.

On June 26, 2012, Chen died of apoplexy at Anzhen Hospital, in Beijing.

== Personal life ==
Chen had two sons, Chen Buda (陈布达) and Chen Peisi, and a daughter, Chen Lida (陈丽达).

== Filmography ==
Year	Title	Chinese title	Role	Notes
1948	Leave Him to Fight Jiang	留下他打老蒋	An old farmer	
1949	The White Warrior	白衣战士	Yang Mingqing	
1949	The Bridge	桥	Hou Zhanxi	
1950	The White Haired Girl	白毛女	Huang Shiren	
1953	Marriage	结婚	Tian Gaohong	
1954	A Resolution	一件提案	Si Laogang	
1958	No Mystery Three Years Ago	三年早知道	Zhao Mantun	
1958	Stories of Young Pioneers	红领巾的故事	Zhang Laogong	
1958	He Beauty in the Picture	画中人	The emperor	
1958	A Visit to Relatives	探亲记	Lao Qiantou	
1959	Trial Trip	试航	Wang Wanshui	
1959	Searching Evidences In Shipyard	船厂追踪	Laoqin	
1960	Spring Blossoms	春暖花开	Guiying's grandfather	
1960	Cloud Seeding	耕云播雨	Xiao Kuan	
1961	The Red Detachment of Women	红色娘子军	Nan Batian	
1962	Strange Adventure Of A Magician	魔术师的奇遇	Lu Huanqi	
1965	Driving Test	路考	Laoliang	
1975	Hai Xia	海霞	Wang Fa	
1976	The Bright Pearls at Sea	海上明珠	Big Guo	
1978	The Great River Flows On	大河奔流	Hai Qing	
1979	What A Family	瞧这一家子	Laohu	
1982	The Sea is Calling	大海在呼唤	Chen Hongye	
1982	Princess Peacocks	孔雀公主	The emperor	
1983	Sunset Street	夕照街	Lao Suntou	
1984	Getting Rich in Their Own Way	生财有道	Big Li	
1986	Father and Son	父与子	Laokui	
1987	Erzi Runs an Inn	二子开店	Laokui	
1987		招财童子	The shopkeeper Ma	
1987	Bits and Pieces	点点滴滴	Grandfather Yu	
1988	Innocent Killer	无罪杀手	Fang Er'tou	
1988	The Silly Manager	傻冒经理	Laokui	
1990	Father, Son and the Old Car	父子老爷车	Laokui	
1990	Eyes of the People	九千六百万双眼睛		
1991	A Gentleman's Revenge	君子复仇	Chen's father	
1992	Father and Son Open A Bar	爷儿俩开歌厅	Laokui	
1994	When Something Amazing Happens	飞来横福	Chen Yinsuo	
1994	The Long March	金沙水拍		
1995	Her Majesty Is Fine	太后吉祥	His Royal Highness	
1997		京都神探	He's father	
1999	A Beautiful Sunset of Life	九九艳阳天	Lao Suntou	
2001	Devils on the Doorstep	鬼子来了	One-stroke Liu	

== Awards ==
Year	Work	Award	Result	Notes
1951	The White Haired Girl	6th Karlovy Vary International Film Festival – Special Recognition Award	Won	
1962	The Red Detachment of Women	Hundred Flowers Award for Best Supporting Actor	Won	
1964	The Red Detachment of Women	3rd Asian - African Film Festival – Best Actor Award	Won	
1995	When Something Amazing Happens	13th Golden Eagle Awards – Best Supporting Actor Award	Won	
2008		29th Hundred Flowers Awards – Lifetime Achievement Award	Won	
