= Chas W. Freeman Jr. =

American retired diplomat and writer

Chas Freeman
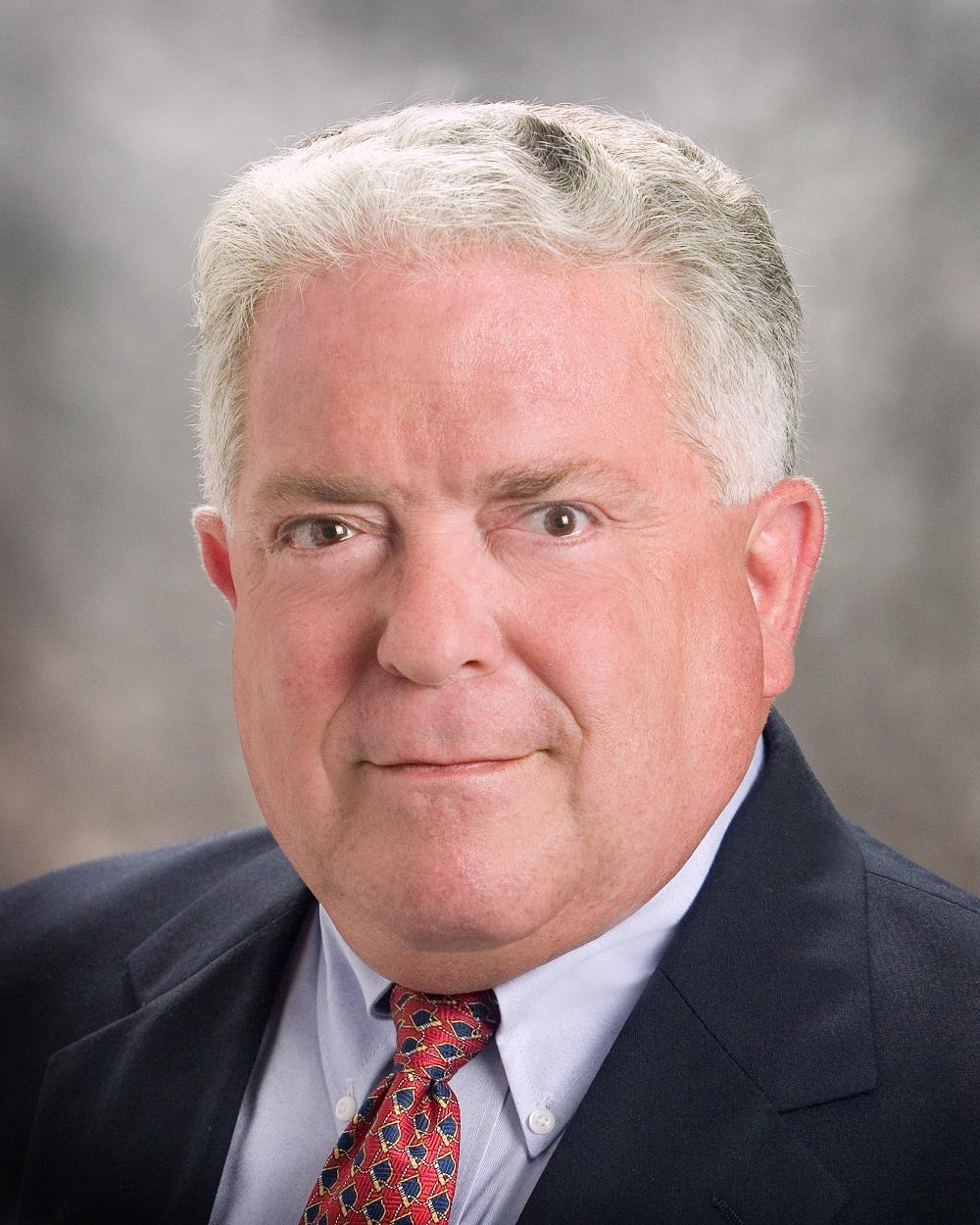

Assistant Secretary of Defense for International Security Affairs
- In office July 6, 1993 – September 14, 1994*
- President: Bill Clinton
- Preceded by: James R. Lilley
- Succeeded by: Joseph Nye

United States Ambassador to Saudi Arabia
- In office January 14, 1990 – August 13, 1992
- President: George H. W. Bush
- Preceded by: Walter L. Cutler
- Succeeded by: David Welch (acting)

Personal details
- Born: March 2, 1943 (age 83) Washington, D.C., U.S.
- Education: Yale University (BA); Harvard University (JD)
- *Titled as Assistant Secretary of Defense for Regional Security Affairs from July 6, 1993 – April 11, 1994.

Charles W. Freeman Jr. (Chinese: 傅立民, born March 2, 1943) is a retired American diplomat and writer. He served in the United States Foreign Service, the State and Defense Departments in many different capacities over the course of thirty years. He was the main interpreter for Richard Nixon during his 1972 China visit and served as the U.S. Ambassador to Saudi Arabia from 1989 to 1992, where he dealt with the Gulf War.

He is a past president of the Middle East Policy Council, co-chair of the U.S. China Policy Foundation and a Lifetime Director of the Atlantic Council. In February 2009, it was reported that Freeman was then-Director of National Intelligence Dennis C. Blair's choice to chair the National Intelligence Council in the Obama administration. After several weeks of criticisms, he withdrew his name from consideration.

== Early life and education ==
Freeman was born in Washington, D.C., on March 2, 1943, to Charles Wellman Freeman and Carla Elizabeth Park. His mother died when he was nine years old. His father, an MIT graduate from Rhode Island who served in the United States Navy during World War II, "declined to join the family business" in Rhode Island and started his own business, with the help of a G.I. loan. As a child Freeman lived in Nassau, The Bahamas, where his father's business was located, and attended the St. Andrew's School. He returned to the United States at age 13 to attend Milton Academy, a private boarding school in Massachusetts.

Freeman matriculated at Yale University in 1960 with a full scholarship and graduated early, magna cum laude, in 1963. He studied at the National Autonomous University of Mexico "for a while, when I was supposed to be at Yale." After graduating from Yale he entered Harvard Law School, but he left during his second year to pursue a career in the United States Foreign Service. He learned to speak Mandarin Chinese beginning in 1969. He finished his JD degree at Harvard in 1975.

== Career ==
=== Government ===
Freeman joined the United States Foreign Service in 1965, working first in India and Taiwan before being assigned to the State Department's China desk. As an officer on the China desk, he was assigned as the principal American interpreter during U.S. President Richard Nixon's 1972 visit to China. He later became the State Department Deputy Director for Republic of China (ROC, commonly known as Taiwan) affairs. The State Department sent Freeman back to Harvard Law School during this time, where he completed his JD The legal research he did there eventually became "the intellectual basis for the Taiwan Relations Act."

After various positions within the State Department he was given overseas assignments as chargé d'affaires and deputy chief of mission at the Embassy in Beijing, China, and then Embassy in Bangkok, Thailand. In 1986, he was appointed as principal deputy assistant secretary of state for African affairs in 1986, a position in which he played a key role in the negotiation of Cuban troop withdrawal from Angola and the independence of Namibia. He became United States Ambassador to Saudi Arabia in November 1989, serving before and after Operation Desert Storm, until August 1992. The Washington Report on Middle East Affairs described his career as "remarkably varied."

From 1992 to 1993 he was a Distinguished Fellow at the Institute for National Strategic Studies. From 1993 to 1994 he was the Assistant Secretary of Defense for International Security Affairs. From 1994 to 1995 he was a Distinguished Fellow at the United States Institute of Peace.

=== Private sector ===
In 1995 he became Chairman of the Board of Projects International, Inc., a Washington, D.C.-based business development company that arranges international joint ventures. From 2004 to 2008 he served on China National Offshore Oil Corporation's advisory board, which convened annually to advise the corporate board on the implications of various global developments (Freeman was neither consulted nor involved in the company's dealings with Iran or its attempt to buy U.S. oil company Unocal). He served as a member of the board of several other corporate and non-profit advisory boards, including diplomatic institutes. He was the editor of the Encyclopædia Britannica's entry on "Diplomacy".

In his thirty-year diplomatic career, Freeman received two Distinguished Public Service Awards, three Presidential Meritorious Service Awards, two Distinguished Honor Awards, the CIA Medallion, a Defense Meritorious Service Award, and four Superior Honor Awards. He speaks fluent Chinese, French, Spanish, and Arabic and has a working knowledge of several other languages.

In 1997, Freeman succeeded George McGovern to become the president of the Middle East Policy Council (MEPC), formerly known as the American Arab Affairs Council, which "strives to ensure that a full range of U.S. interests and views are considered by policy makers."

In 2006 MEPC was the first American outlet to publish Chicago Professor John Mearsheimer and Harvard Professor Stephen Walt's working paper called The Israel Lobby and U.S. Foreign Policy. According to a Wall Street Journal opinion piece, Freeman endorsed the paper's thesis, and he said of MEPC's stance that "No one else in the United States has dared to publish this article, given the political penalties that the Lobby imposes on those who criticize it."

Freeman has written two books on statecraft. Arts of Power: Statecraft and Diplomacy was published by the U.S. Institute of Peace in 1997. The Diplomat's Dictionary has gone through several revisions, the most recent of which, also published by USIP, came out in 2010. He is also the author of three books on U.S. foreign policy in the Middle East and in China. America's Misadventures in the Middle East, published by Just World Books in 2010, focused on Bush's invasion of Iraq, America's failure to lead in the same way it did in the postwar years, and Saudi Arabia. Interesting Times: China, America, and the Shifting Balance of Prestige, published in 2013, is Freeman's analysis of China-U.S. relations between 1969 and 2012 and his predictions about its future. America's Continuing Misadventures in the Middle East, which continues Freeman's analysis of the evolving disorder in the region, came out in 2016.

== National Intelligence Council appointment controversy ==
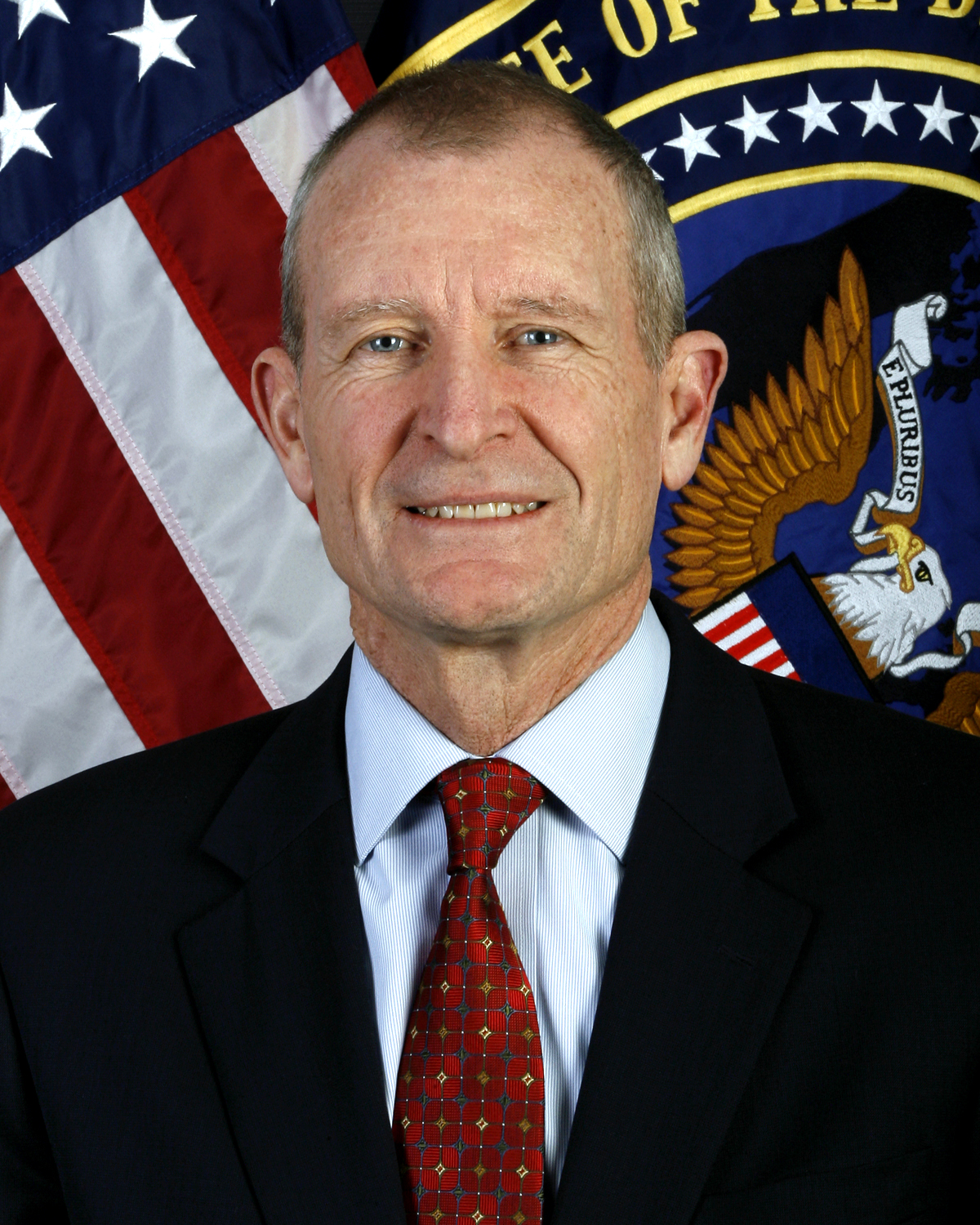
Dennis Blair named Freeman as chair of the National Intelligence Council

On February 19, 2009, Laura Rozen reported in Foreign Policy that according to unidentified "sources," Freeman would become chair of the National Intelligence Council. The council culls intelligence from many U.S. agencies and compiles them into National Intelligence Estimates; Rozen described it as "the intelligence community's primary big-think shop and the lead body in producing national intelligence estimates." Within hours, Steve J. Rosen, a former top official at the American Israel Public Affairs Committee (AIPAC), published a scathing criticism of the reported (but unconfirmed) appointment, which he wrongly described as being to a senior position in the CIA. Rosen described Freeman as "a strident critic of Israel, and a textbook case of the old-line Arabism that afflicted American diplomacy at the time the state of Israel was born" and accused him of maintaining "an extremely close relationship" with the Saudi foreign ministry.

On February 26, 2009, the Director of National Intelligence (DNI) Dennis C. Blair named Freeman as chair of the National Intelligence Council. Blair cited Freeman's "diverse background in defense, diplomacy and intelligence."

The earlier reports of the nomination had already mobilized a wide campaign against it, prodded along throughout by Steven J. Rosen, who published 19 blog posts on the topic over two weeks. In a late March article in the London Review of Books, John Mearsheimer cited articles by a number of influential pro-Israeli writers that had appeared between February 19 and 26. On February 25, the Zionist Organization of America publicly called for rescinding "the reported appointment." Representative Steve Israel wrote to the Inspector General of the Office of the DNI calling for an investigation of Freeman's "relationship with the Saudi government" given his "prejudicial public statements" against Israel.

All seven Republican members of the Senate Select Committee on Intelligence signed a letter raising "concerns about Mr. Freeman's lack of experience and uncertainty about his objectivity". Eighty-seven Chinese dissidents wrote a letter to President Obama asking him to reconsider the appointment. House Speaker Nancy Pelosi, who was said to be "incensed" by Freeman's seemingly justifying view of the Tiananmen Square massacre, reportedly urged President Obama against the selection. Freeman responded that his Tiananmen Square remarks were taken out of context since they had represented "his assessment of how Chinese leaders had seen things."

Robert Dreyfuss wrote that "Though Blair strongly defended Freeman, the two men got no support from an anxious White House, which took (politely put) a hands-off approach. Seeing the writing on the wall—all over the wall, in fact—Freeman came to the conclusion that, even if he could withstand the storm, his ability to do the job had, in effect, already been torpedoed."

On March 10, Freeman bowed out. A fuller account of this whole affair was published by James M. Wall in The Link.

Freeman issued a statement on his reasons for withdrawal, stating, "I do not believe the National Intelligence Council could function effectively while its chair was under constant attack by unscrupulous people with a passionate attachment to the views of a political faction in a foreign country," and he identified the country as Israel. He wrote that the "outrageous agitation" following the leak of his pending appointment initially to Politico would raise questions about whether the Obama administration would be able to make independent decisions "about the Middle East and related issues." He cited especially interference by Israel supporters, writing:

The libels on me and their easily traceable email trails show conclusively that there is a powerful lobby determined to prevent any view other than its own from being aired. The tactics of the Israel lobby plumb the depths of dishonour and indecency and include character assassination, selective misquotation, the wilful distortion of the record, the fabrication of falsehoods, and an utter disregard for the truth. ... The aim of this lobby is control of the policy process through the exercise of a veto over the appointment of people who dispute the wisdom of its views, the substitution of political correctness for analysis, and the exclusion of any and all options for decision by Americans and our government other than those that it favors.

After his withdrawal Freeman gave an interview to Robert Dreyfuss in The Nation saying he regretted he did not identify his attackers as "right-wing Likud in Israel and its fanatic supporters here"—what he called the "(Avigdor) Lieberman lobby." He also said that President Obama may have been able to deflect the attacks from Democrats if he had stepped in sooner, but acknowledged that he and the National Intelligence Council still "would have been subjected to a slanderous attack", making the job near impossible. He said that these attacks were meant to dissuade other critics of Israel from accepting government positions, but he had received messages from a number of Jews who also disagreed with Israel's policies.

In an interview with Fareed Zakaria on CNN he repeated many of the same points, adding a defense of past comments about the September 11 attacks, saying that the United States' past actions had "catalyzed—perhaps not caused, but catalyzed—a radicalization of Arab and Muslim politics that facilitates the activities of terrorists with global reach." He stated he was "deeply insulted" by those charging antisemitism and that he had a "great respect for Judaism and its adherents". He also said Saudi Arabia has "definitely been successfully vilified in our politics", despite efforts by the current Saudi king to reform his country and promote peace with Israel. He ended by expressing optimism about President Obama saying he has a "strategic mind" and that what America needs is a "strategic review of the policies that have brought us to this sorry pass in which we now find ourselves—not just in the Middle East, but in many other places, as well." Freeman was also interviewed by Riz Khan.

In an interview quoted in the New York Times, Freeman said "Israel is driving itself toward a cliff, and it is irresponsible not to question Israeli policy and to decide what is best for the American people." In the same article Mark Mazzetti and Helene Cooper echoed Freeman's accusations: "The lobbying campaign against Mr. Freeman included telephone calls to the White House from prominent lawmakers, including Senator Charles E. Schumer, the New York Democrat. It appears to have been kicked off three weeks ago in a blog post by Steve J. Rosen, a former top official of the American Israel Public Affairs Committee, a pro-Israel lobbying group." While some members of Congress denied that the Israel lobby played a significant role, The Forward said "Many of the lawmakers demanding an investigation into Freeman's qualifications for the intelligence post are known as strong supporters of Israel".

On March 11, the Washington Post printed an anonymous editorial describing Freeman and those with similar opinions as "conspiracy theorists" issuing "crackpot tirades." The same day, the Post also published a column by David Broder stating that the Obama administration had "just suffered an embarrassing defeat at the hands of the lobbyists [that] the president vowed to keep in their place, and their friends on Capitol Hill." The same edition of the Washington Post carried a front-page article detailing various Jewish organizations' lobbying efforts to derail Freeman's appointment.

== Views on foreign policy issues ==
Associated Press has characterized Freeman as "outspoken" on issues including Israel, Iraq, and the war on terror.

=== September 11 attacks ===
Freeman commented at a Washington Institute for Near East Policy meeting in 2002 that,

And what of America's lack of introspection about September 11? Instead of asking what might have caused the attack, or questioning the propriety of the national response to it, there is an ugly mood of chauvinism. Before Americans call on others to examine themselves, we should examine ourselves. In October 2005, Freeman said: "On the question of U.S. strikes on targets in Iran or elsewhere, I simply want to register what I think is an obvious point; namely that what 9/11 showed is that if we bomb people, they bomb back."

Commenting in Abu Dhabi on the death of Osama Bin Laden in 2011, Freeman remarked that:

By any standard of righteousness, Osama bin Laden deserved to die. His life dishonored Islam. His death in Abbottabad dishonored no one but himself. He was condemned by his own actions, which violated the moral principles of every religion. He personally incarnated the exception to the rule against the killing of human beings that is recounted in the Holy Qur'an. It recalls (5:32) that God: "decreed for the Children of Israel that to kill any person who has not committed murder or horrendous crimes is like murdering all of humankind."

Osama was that very murderer who directed the commission of horrendous crimes. He leaves behind him many monuments to the evil in his heart. He does not deserve them, but these monuments are both numerous and large. It will take a long time to pull them down, but this must now be done.

Osama expected to die by violence, as he did. Sadly, he probably died a satisfied man. In addition to alienating Muslims and the West from each other, as was his aim, he achieved so many other transformations of the order he sought to overthrow. Everyone who walks shoeless through a metal detector in an airport pays grudging tribute to him. His legacies include hatred and suspicion that have erected barriers to travel to and within the West and that impede the sort of dialogue you in this gathering are about to begin. He catalyzed two wars. He bears responsibility for the death of thousands in the West and hundreds of thousands in this region. The unfunded financial burden of the conflicts he ignited has come close to bankrupting the United States. Indirectly, it is upending the international monetary system. It has produced recession in the West. Osama will have been pleased.

The mass murders Osama contrived inflamed passions that spurred American political leaders to set aside the constraints of the United States constitution and laws. There has been serious erosion in American civil liberties amidst popular disdain for the rule of law both at home and abroad. This is what paved the way for the horrors of Abu Ghraib, "extraordinary rendition," and "enhanced interrogation techniques"—otherwise known as "cruel and unusual punishment," "kidnapping," and "torture."

=== Iraq War ===
In 2004, Freeman was among 27 retired diplomats and military commanders who publicly said the administration of President George W. Bush did not understand the world and was unable to handle "in either style or substance" the responsibilities of global leadership. On June 16, 2004 the Diplomats and Military Commanders for Change issued a statement against the Iraq War.

=== Israel ===
In a 2005 speech to a conference of The National Council on U.S.-Arab Relations Freeman stated,

As long as the United States continues unconditionally to provide the subsidies and political protection that make the Israeli occupation and the high-handed and self-defeating policies it engenders possible, there is little, if any, reason to hope that anything resembling the former peace process can be resurrected. Israeli occupation and settlement of Arab lands is inherently violent.

He explained that he had spoken out because he believed

US-Arab relations matter greatly to my country and because, unlike many in Washington, I do not believe in diplomacy-free foreign policy and have a healthy regard for what is now derided as "reality-based analysis."

In a 2006 speech to the annual US-Arab Policymakers Conference, Freeman said that Americans allowing Israel to "call the shots in the Middle East" had "revealed how frightened Israelis now are of their Arab neighbors" and that the results of the "experiment" were that "left to its own devices, the Israeli establishment will make decisions that harm Israelis, threaten all associated with them, and enrage those who are not."

In a 2007 speech to the Pacific Council on International Policy Freeman said that "Al Qaeda has played us with the finesse of a matador exhausting a great bull by guiding it into unproductive lunges." He cited the 2003 invasion of Iraq which "transformed an intervention in Afghanistan most Muslims had supported into what looks to them like a wider war against Islam." He held that the United States had "embraced Israel's enemies as our own" and that Arabs had "responded by equating Americans with Israelis as their enemies". Charging the United States now backed Israel's "efforts to pacify its captive and increasingly ghettoized Arab populations" and to "seize ever more Arab land for its colonists."

In numerous places in his 2010 book America's Misadventures in the Middle East, Freeman gives evidence of his support for the wellbeing of the State of Israel. For example, on p. 121, at a point that republishes views he first expressed in October 2009, he writes, "A just and durable peace in the Holy Land that secures the State of Israel should be an end in itself for the United States."

Ambassador Freeman argued that the "United States essentially has disqualified itself as a mediator" of the Israel/Palestine peace process at the New America Foundation on January 26, 2011. He argued that the United States cannot "play the role of mediator because of the political hammerlock that the right-wing in Israel through its supporters [in the US] exercises in our politics." Freeman then went on to argue that United States vetoes of UN Resolutions condemning Israeli settlements in Occupied Territory undermine the role of international law.

In remarks to the Palestine Center on May 4, 2011, Freeman stated that

The cruelties of Israelis to their Arab captives and neighbors, especially in the ongoing siege of Gaza and repeated attacks on the people of Lebanon, have cost the Jewish state much of the global sympathy that the Holocaust previously conferred on it. The racist tyranny of Jewish settlers over West Bank Arabs and the progressive emergence of a version of apartheid in Israel itself are deeply troubling to a growing number of people abroad. ... Ironically, Israel–conceived as a refuge and guarantee against European anti-Semitism–has become the sole conceivable stimulus to its revival and globalization. ... Israel is vigorously engaged in the collective punishment and systematic ethnic cleansing of its captive Arab populations. It rails against terrorism while carrying out policies explicitly described as intended to terrorize the peoples of the territories it is attacking or into which it is illegally expanding.

On September 12, 2024, Freeman appeared for an interview in the Youtube video channel SaltCubeAnalytics titled "The dirty secrets of US-Israel relations: with US Ambassador Chas Freeman" in which "Freeman offers a candid and unfiltered analysis of the Middle East conflict and its far-reaching consequences," and in particular "the heavy toll of America's unconditional support for Israel to the influence of AIPAC on US politics."

=== Saudi Arabia ===
In 1991, as ambassador to Saudi Arabia, Freeman gave an interview listing the ways Saudi Arabia has been helpful to the United States. It contributed $13.5 billion to the 1991 Gulf War effort and provided fuel, water, accommodations, and transport for U.S. forces on Saudi soil. Immediately after the war, it rapidly increased its oil production, which prevented the U.S. recession "from becoming far worse." He also stated Saudi Arabia continued to insist for oil to be in dollars "in part out of friendship with the United States." He warned that with the "emergence of other currencies and with strains in the relationship," Saudi Arabians might begin to question why they should do so.

In September 2002, Freeman remarked in London:

The September 11 suicide attacks on the United States by extremist Muslim terrorists, most of them Saudi nationals, led fairly rapidly to U.S. solidarity—first on the emotional level and then as a matter of policy—with Israel as a fellow victim of suicide bombings by Muslim extremists. It also provided an opportunity for an onslaught of criticism of Saudi Arabia in the American media, often by commentators whose imaginations far outran their knowledge of the Kingdom. Their attacks featured the elements of Saudi culture and society most objectionable to liberal democratic ideology—the peculiar intolerance of Saudi Islam, the alleged anti-Jewish and anti-Christian bias of the educational system, and the subordinate status of women—to paint a portrait of the Kingdom as an enemy, rather than a friend. The Christian right joined with the Zionist left to identify Saudi religious particularism with both terrorism and anti-Americanism.

=== China ===
In a 2007 article on the implications of the People's Republic of China's (PRC) success or failure in integrating its people and economy, Freeman wrote, "Almost every ideological faction and interest group in our country now asserts its own vision of the People's Republic. Some do so out of fascination, others out of dread." Noting what he considered to be "differing moral judgments" in religious freedom and population control, he said, "we must not only understand why each side feels as it does, but what it is and isn't actually doing and what the real — as opposed to the imagined — consequences of what it is doing are likely to be."

==== Support for government crackdown in Tiananmen Square ====
In an email leaked to the press, Freeman described the conclusions of a Chinese government review of factors, which, it said, made its 1989 crackdown on democracy protesters in Tiananmen Square unavoidable. In 2009, it was reported that U.S. House speaker Nancy Pelosi considered Freeman's views "indefensible" and complained directly to President Barack Obama about the nomination of Freeman to the National Intelligence Council. In the email Freeman wrote:

I find the dominant view in China about this very plausible, i.e. that the truly unforgivable mistake of the Chinese authorities was the failure to intervene on a timely basis to nip the demonstrations in the bud, rather than—as would have been both wise and efficacious—to intervene with force when all other measures had failed to restore domestic tranquility to Beijing and other major urban centers in China. In this optic, the Politburo's response to the mob scene at "Tian'anmen" stands as a monument to overly cautious behavior on the part of the leadership, not as an example of rash action.

For myself, I side on this—if not on numerous other issues—with Gen. Douglas MacArthur. I do not believe it is acceptable for any country to allow the heart of its national capital to be occupied by dissidents intent on disrupting the normal functions of government, however appealing to foreigners their propaganda may be.

=== Taiwan ===
In February 2022, The Economist quoted Chas Freeman as saying that the U.S. frittered away opportunities created in 1972 for a peaceful accommodation between Taiwan (ROC) and the PRC. He urged the U.S. to push Taiwan to negotiate a settlement, to avoid a war, while conceding that Chinese rulers would roll back some democratic freedoms in Taiwan.

== Writings ==
- America's Continuing Misadventures in the Middle East, at Just World Books
- Interesting Times: China, America, and the Shifting Balance of Prestige, at Just World Books
- America's Misadventures in the Middle East, at Just World Books
- Arts of Power: Statecraft and Diplomacy, at US Institute of Peace bookstore
- The Diplomat's Dictionary, at US Institute of Peace bookstore
- Cooking Western in China

Diplomatic posts
Preceded by Walter L. Cutler	United States Ambassador to Saudi Arabia; 1990–1992	Succeeded by David Welch; Acting
