= The Red Detachment of Women (1961 film) =

- Theatrical release poster
- Directed by: Xie Jin
- Written by: Liang Xin (b. 1926)
- Produced by: Ding Li
- Starring: Zhu Xijuan; Wang Xingang; Xiang Mei; Jin Naihua; Chen Qiang; Niu Ben
- Cinematography: Shen Xilin
- Edited by: Wei Chunbao
- Music by: Huang Zhun
- Production company: Shanghai Film Studio
- Release date: January 30, 1961 (China)
- Running time: 110 minutes
- Country: China
- Language: Mandarin Chinese

The Red Detachment of Women (Chinese: 红色娘子军; pinyin: Hóngsè Niángzi Jūn) is a 1961 Chinese war film by Xie Jin based on a script by Liang Xin. It is set in the 1930s and involves two peasant women who go into warfare. The cast includes Zhu Xijuan, Wang Xingang, Xiang Mei, Jin Naihua, Chen Qiang, and Niu Ben.

The Red Detachment of Women became famous after winning the PRC's best script, best director, and best actress awards in November 1961. The film characters of Qiong Hua, Hong Changqing, and Nan Batian became quite well-known and, following the success of the Red Detachment of Women ballet in 1964, by the end of 1966 was elevated to one of the eight "revolutionary model theatrical works" (geming yangbanxi, or yangbanxi for short), which formed the official canon. A film of the ballet was released in 1970.

== Plot ==
In September 1930, the Chinese Communist Party (CCP) set up a division in Hainan Island, which contained a company of female soldiers called the Red Detachment of Women. The CCP representative, Hong Changqing disguises as an oversea businessman to come across Nan Batian. He claims that he is back from abroad with large fortunes. Attempting to expand his armed forces with Changqing's help, Nan Batian holds a feast for Changqing. During Changqing's visit to Batian, he takes notice of a maidservant of Batian who suffers from Batian's torture. He makes a simple excuse to take that maidservant with him in order to free her from the oppression. At the time of their parting, Changqing knows her name is Wu Qionghua and she intends to be a soldier to fight against the feudal landlord. Guiding by Hong Changqing, Qionghua makes her way to the encampment with another young woman, Fu Honglian, who refuses her life as a widow. They are welcomed by the Red Detachment of Women because of their poor backgrounds.

In a following reconnaissance mission, Qionghua occasionally sees Nan Batian and she fires at him despite the military discipline. Batian is wounded while Qionghua's mission is failed. The company commander trained her in serious criticism and Hong Changqing reminds her of her position as a revolutionary fighter. Afterward in another mission, Hong Changqing and Wu Qionghua disguise as a businessman and his maidservant the same as before to enter Nan Batian's fort as spies. In the battle of Batian's fort, the Red Army successfully occupies the fort with help from inside and captures Nan Batian alive. However, the crafty Nan Batian escapes through a tunnel. In the following peasant movements, Qionghua takes an active part and she applies to join the Chinese Communist Party.

The escaping Nan Batian reports the situation to the government and the KMT assigns a brigade to attack the Red Army in Hainan Island. The Red Army retreats to the mountains. In a battle to cover the retreat, Hong Changqing is wounded and he is captured alive. He refuses to surrender and accepts his death bravely. Having witnessed Changqing's death, Qionghua returns to the encampment and becomes the successive CCP representative. She organizes an operation to destroy Nan Batian's forces after the KMT brigade leaves Hainan Island. They successfully occupy Batian's fort again and sentence the death of Nan Batian. Under Wu Qionghua's leadership, the Red Detachment of Women is marching to a bright future.

== Filmmakers ==
=== Director ===
==== Xie Jin （谢晋）（1923.11.21-2008.10.18） ====
Evaluation:“Xie Jin is the national soul of Chinese films. He pays attention to the destiny of the nation. His films represent the changes of different times, which can let the audience see the real living conditions of people at that time and the significance of the times. His artistic pursuit of developing synchronously with the times and seeking new changes is admirable. Always keep pace with the times, is the biggest characteristic of Xie Jin. In his works, there is a strong sense of social responsibility and patriotic national consciousness, and with the combination of film narrative methods close to the public, reached the peak of political and ethical melodrama, and shaped a series of successful female images.”(By Shuqin Huang, Quan Yuan, Hong yin)

=== Writer ===
==== Liang Xin (梁信) （1926.3.2－2017.1.28） ====
Evaluation: Liang Xin's film literary creation can be divided into two periods. His early plays reflect several important historical periods of the people's revolutionary war. The later works have various themes and extensive contents, he combines history with people, and shows the essential characteristics of the times through the emotional actions of characters in various historical periods. Like other writers, Liang Xin defended and advocated the nationalization of film. His creation process is a careful, careful and earnest process of exploring the road of film nationalization. He attaches great importance to the expression of national consciousness and national spirit, and is not limited to the description of love. In his plays, he describes the behavior of the characters and pays attention to the nationalization.

=== Main Charactors ===
==== Wu Qionghua ====
Actress: Zhu Xijuan

Wu Qionghua is a maidservant belongs to a feudal landlord, Nan Batian. She is a tenacious, pungent, brave youth whose father was skinned by Nan Batian. She has been lived in hatred to the landlord for a long time and never yields even in water prison after being whipped. With Hong Changqing's help, she is able to join the Red Detachment of Women, where she grows from an ordinary soldier to a proletarian pioneer fighter.

Evaluation of Xijuan Zhu: After a lot of hard work, Zhu Xijuan finally completed the transformation from a "student" to a "detachment of women". In the film, Zhu uses her " burning eyes" and strong body language to make the rebellious and resolute personality of Wu Qionghua's perfectly. "At that time, all the other actors in the film were already famous, but I was still a nobody," Zhu recalled. Movies at that time were full of dramatic performances. I had no idea what I wanted to do. All I knew was that I had to fulfill the tasks assigned by the Party and play my role well. When take play, director Xie always charge us not to see lens, do not care about whether beautiful or not, but just follow the plots and play your part well.” (By Yu Xin)

==== Hong Changqing ====
Actor: Wang Xingang

Hong Changqing is the young Party representative of the women detachment. He is a firm, strong character who is loyal and enthusiastic towards the Communist Party. Because of the hardship his father suffered, Changqing struggled in the society at a young age and gained much experience, which made him mature. In the conversation with Wu Qionghua, he uses his self-experience to persuade her and helps her grow.

==== Nan Batian ====
Actor: Chen Qiang

Nan Batian is one of the largest feudal landlords in Hainan Island. He is a cruel, fierce, crafty, and arbitrary character who believes himself of great talent. He has relationships with both government and local bandits. He also recruits militias and sets up checkpoints in the area he controls. Nan Batian is the archenemy of the Hainan Red Army.

==== Fu Honglian ====
Actress: Xiang Mei

Fu Honglian is also an honest, kind young woman who suffers feudal oppression. She was sold as a child bride at the age of 10. Her husband had already died, and she has been accompanied a "wooden husband" for ten years. Such mental torture pushes her to join the red army when Wu Qionghua comes to her house on a rainy night. They join the Red Detachment of Women together and fight side by side in the following battles.

==== Majordomo ====
Actor: Yang Mengchang

The majordomo of Nan Batian is a scholar image with a poker face. He is very careful and suspicious. He always does his best to fulfill his master's will. He also gives Nan Batian many ideas when Batian is dealing with tricky problems. When his advice is obstinately rejected by Nan Batian, he sighs for not having a wise master.

=== Staff ===
Camera Operator	Shen Xilin
Sound Designer	Gong Zhengming
Art Director	Zhang Hanchen
Editor	Wei Chunbao
Executive Line Producers	Ding Li
Assistant to Director	Wang Jie
Original Music	Huang Zhun
Military Consultant	Ma Baishan
Pyrotechnic Supervisor	Chen Yonggeng
Make-up Artists	Wang Tiebin

== Songs ==
=== Song of the Red Detachment of Women ===
Song of the Red Detachment of Women Timecode in the film: 0:40-2:18 and 1:50:10-1:50:45

=== Red Flags Fly on Mt Wuzhi ===
Red Flags Fly on Mt Wuzhi Timecode in the film: 36:23-38:10

== Wu Qionghua’s Historical Archetype ==
The archetype of Wu Qionghua in the movie is not a single character, but an artistic image shaped by synthesizing the experiences and character traits of a number of real historical figures. The movie integrates the real deeds of Feng Zengmin. Her and Wu Qionghua's life trajectories highly overlap: born in poverty, oppressed by the landlord, grew up to be the leader of the Maiden Scouts after joining the revolution, and captured the bullies alive. In addition, the movie takes the name of Pang Qionghua. As the first commander of the “Women's Army Special Services Company”, Wu Qionghua's name is obviously borrowed from her. In addition, the movie also synthesizes the experiences of other unnamed female fighters. The screenwriter, Liang Xin, mentions that Wu Qionghua's portrayal also incorporates the experiences of several oppressed women he met in the Northeast, such as a maid who escaped the landlord's mistreatment several times and a female warrior who survived being buried alive. These characters provide a realistic basis for Wu Qionghua's rebellious character and motivation for revenge.

== Production History ==
There was a strong desire to produce works of dance and film within the years before and after the 1961 film, with a particular interest in these artistic practices as performed by women. The film was then developed to promote the Chinese Communist Party (CCP), its ideology and the strength of women during the Chinese Civil War. There was a particular interest in film during and after the cultural revolution due to its popularity as a medium. The CCP used the arts, including dance and film, to promote these ideas around socialism both at home and around the world

By the mid-1960s, the individual authors associated with The Red Detachment of Women began to lose prominence, replaced by a new model of collective authorship aligned with Cultural Revolution ideals. This shift emphasized mass participation, though it coincided with increasing involvement from state figures like Jiang Qing. The ballet’s development became politically charged, with multiple parties—including Prime Minister Zhou Enlai, the Beijing Ballet School, and the China Peking Opera Academy—contributing to its formation. While Jiang Qing has sometimes been credited with the work’s creation, research suggests her influence became significant only later in the process.

The Peking opera version of The Red Detachment of Women, despite being scripted and filmed in 1972, never gained the same recognition as the ballet. Although both versions originated between late 1963 and early 1964, the opera’s development was less publicized and more fraught. Its libretto underwent many revisions, several of which were rejected by Jiang Qing. Although it was staged in 1964 as part of a major opera festival, the production was largely forgotten—possibly due to the later political persecution of its key playwrights, A Jia and Tian Han. In contrast, the ballet quickly gained national prominence. Its use of a Western dance form made it stand out, as only two of the eight official model works—The Red Detachment of Women and The White-Haired Girl—were ballets. It also received strong support and promotion from Jiang Qing. When both the ballet and opera were adapted for film, the ballet was produced by the Beijing Film Studio with seasoned filmmakers, while the opera was filmed by the less experienced August First Film Studio.

Early official accounts of the ballet’s creation emphasized the collective nature of the production and the challenge of adapting existing material—including a feature film and local Hainan opera—into ballet. The creative team conducted field research in Hainan in 1964, drawing on local performers and traditions. The resulting ballet blended Chinese stage practices with Soviet ballet techniques, reflecting Mao Zedong’s directive to integrate foreign methods in service of Chinese ideology. Elements of Peking opera, folk music, and regional cultures were incorporated, and two songs from the original film—“The Army and People Are One” and “The Song of the Red Women’s Company”—were adapted into the score.

From its debut on National Day in October 1964, the ballet continued to evolve, even after it was officially recognized as a model work in 1966–67. Variations in choreography, character portrayal, and staging occurred throughout its performance history. For example, a dramatic move in which Qionghua rolled onto her back to retrieve a dagger was later altered—viewed as too submissive—so that she instead remained standing and kicked the weapon from the antagonist’s hand.

== Influences and Propaganda ==
=== Cultural Revolution ===
The Cultural Revolution (1966–76) was a period in Chinese history initiated by Mao Zedong with the stated purpose of combatting bureaucratism within the Party, ending a right-ward drift in society, and preventing the Chinese Revolution from ossifying; many critics have pointed out the upheaval it created. The government endeavored to reshape society through arts and culture, keeping ideological acceptable works and banning ones that contradicted the revolutionary line. Later, all traditional and Western-influenced plays are banned as well. Yet this period also witnesses the creation of “革命样板戏 (revolutionary opera)”, The Red Detachment of Women is one of the few that survived during the revolution period.

However, the real history is very different from the story on the screen. As a combat unit, the Red Detachment of Women lasted only 500 days before it was broken up by Kuomintang troops. Some of them died on the battlefield and a few were captured. Most of the rest returned to civilian life, hidden from view. It wasn't until many years later when their stories were discovered by accident, and they became the main characters in novel, movies, and stage plays. However, what happened to them after they put down their guns and the long life after that is rarely mentioned. During the ill-fated Cultural Revolution, the ballet version of “The Red Detachment of Women" became one of the many ballets used to entertain foreign guests, was designated as a Revolutionary opera, and was remade into a film, showing all over the country. In the contemporary academia, there are scholars challenged the view that model operas were merely propaganda tools. For example, Barbara Mittler argued that works like The Red Detachment of Women also worked as influential cultural productions that molded collective memory and aesthetic practices during the Cultural Revolution. These are two very different images: On stage, they are the heroes of the revolution; in reality, they are the objects of the revolution.

The reality is that some of the soldiers fell into a low ebb in the political movements after 1949 because of the experience of being captured by the Kuomintang or being married to "politically incorrect" people. Writers and artists who created the Red Detachment of Women series of works of art also faced repercussions to varying degrees. Bai Shuxiang (白淑湘), the first actress to play Wu Qionghua in the ballet Red Detachment of Women, was labeled as “destructive Revolutionary opera" and "counter-revolutionary” and was once sent to a Labor camp. The screenwriter, director, and former head of the National Ballet of China, Li Chengxiang (李承祥), was dismissed as a "capitalist roader" and locked up in a cowshed until the capitalist needed him to play the villain "Nanba Tian"(南霸天). The archetype and the artistic image, two groups that are far apart from each other, suddenly became class enemies. They are the shadow of the on-stage glorious Red Detachment of Women, where the light of history turns dark.

=== Feminism ===
Unlike Western feminism, Chinese socialist feminism was mobilized by the country's leader and the Chinese Communist Party gave authority and power to works of art that allows them to influence the public. One of the main goals of China's revolutionary journey was to focus on the liberation of women. Under the Party's mandate, women were emancipated from tradition and it is so important since this indicates a huge revolutionary change that women are as capable as men. “The Red Detachment of Women” was created base on the archetype of the all-female battalion and the film strongly promoted the theme that women can also serve as soldiers and do revolutions. Mao's slogan that "women hold up half the sky" became one of the most impactful expressions of gender equality in socialist China. Scholars have described Mao-era gender policy as a form of state feminism, indicating that women's participation in labor and revolutionary politics was actively encouraged by the state. Heroines under Mao's communist theatre challenged the traditional stereotyped women. Theses female characters fought for women's liberation and gender equalitarianism. Just like Qiong Hua, she fought for her unfortunate life and against feudal patriarchy.

Unlike the ballet version of The Red Detachment of Women, the 1961 film places greater emphasis on the connection between sexual repression of women and class oppression through its narration of Honglian's difficult life and the "wood-made dummy" in her bed, which symbolizes her dead husband.

However, in recent years some feminist scholars criticized what he called feminism politics. Revolutionary artistic production seems to embrace the female population, it also erased femininity. The communist artwork heroine all have a common characteristic which is women act like a man. Therefore, Mao's heroines are concluded as having the characteristics of “gender erasure”, and scholars consider this seems to be built on the stereotype of a pre-existing gender pattern assigned to women.

=== Propaganda (revolutionary classics) ===
From the 1900s when cinema entered the market, it started to play an important role in the Chinese Communist Party's media strategy. Film like Operation Red Sea successfully merged patriotic narratives with a Hollywood type of story. This attracted numerous audiences and enhanced people's national assertiveness. From early years of the establishment of the People's Republic of China to present, the Chinese Communist Party oversees the film industry through the Propaganda Department of the Chinese Communist Party which controls the film industry.

Mao and his wife Jiang employed literature and art as propagandistic tools to influence the general public. The Red Detachment of Women (the ballet) had an unambiguously intent on propaganda, and its production skill was undeniable. In the ballet, villains were dark and showed up in dim color while the heroes were pure and they appeared with a bright and vivid atmosphere. This sharp color comparison created a strong visual contrast to the audience for ideological education. Later, the government started a moving cinema to bring the film to the villages. Through watching various revolutionary based communist movies, people enjoyed the entertainment, and at the same time they carried out a subtle influence.

"Red classics" is a unique type of literary works in China, which mainly refers to literary works created by relying on the theme of revolutionary realism. The Red Detachment of Women is a famous red classic, which shows the revolutionary spirit, gender consciousness and liberation concept in China's revolutionary struggle. The red thought to be conveyed in the film can be summarized as "communism is true, the party is the leader", relying on the collective strength of the proletariat to achieve real communism, and in this process, it is inseparable from the guidance, leadership and even sacrifice of a number of successive Communist Party members. The Red Detachment of Women is a classic work in the history of Chinese film. The legendary story, the classic female image and the great revolutionary spirit of the Red Detachment of Women are an immortal light in the revolutionary history and film history of the People's Republic of China.

== Visual Language and Cinematography ==
The Red Detachment of Women uses a strong visual style to express revolutionary ideas and class struggle. Scholar Cui Weiping points out that the film’s lighting contrasts, such as between scenes of oppression and freedom, help the audience clearly see the difference between the old and new social orders. The repetition of visual elements like red flags, marching soldiers, and symmetrical group scenes creates a sense of discipline and collective power. These images aren’t just for looks; they carry political meaning and support the film’s overall message.

== Legacy and Political Influence ==
Besides being well-known in China, The Red Detachment of Women was also used as a cultural symbol in other countries. Scholar Lydia H. Liu explains that during the 1970s, both the movie and its ballet version were shown in international festivals to represent China’s revolutionary values. These performances helped the country present a powerful image of women’s liberation and unity under socialism. These performances helped the country showcase a strong image of women’s liberation and solidarity within the socialist system. This ideology not only championed new gender roles for women, but also regarded women as subservient to the goals of a strictly structured Communist social order. It was a true reflection of the features typical of the Maoist gender politics. The film became one way for the Chinese government to promote its political ideas to audiences outside of China.

== Behind the Scenes ==
=== Shooting Background ===
In 1958, Liang Xin, a professional creator of the Central South Military Area Command, went to Hainan Island to experience life. In the Memorial Hall of Revolutionary Heroes, Liang Xin was inspired by the pictures of the Red Detachment of Women, and he decided to write a script about them. Liang xin stayed in the hotel for whole 4 days and finished the script<琼岛英雄花>Liang then sent the script to film studios and magazines all over the country, but to his disappointment, he did not receive any reply. Two years later, when Liang Xin began to forget the script, he suddenly received a letter from the Shanghai Film Studio, Xie Jin said in the letter that he was moved by the script and decided to make a movie of it. He asked Liang Xin to come to Shanghai for a meeting. For Xie Jin's letter, Liang Xin was excited. He immediately went to Shanghai to discuss the script with Xie Jin, and soon came up with a new script for the film after revision. Xie decided to rename the film "The Red Detachment of Women" because he thought the name <琼岛英雄花>was a bit cultural. Later, he was chosen by the director of Shanghai Tianma Film Studio, Xie Jin, and was renamed "The Red Detachment of Women". The film was eventually made by Shanghai Tianma Film Studio.

=== Shooting Preparation ===
After making the decision to shoot, Xie Jin went to Hainan alone, spent half a year to select the shooting place for The Red Detachment of Women. In the summer of 1959, Xie Jin led Zhu Xijuan and other lead actors to come to Hainan for experiences in order to allow the actors to adapt to the roles as soon as possible. In addition to organizing them to read novels and memoirs that reflect the revolutionary struggle of the Red Army era, Xie Jin also asked every actor who played the female army to wear leggings, perform military exercises, and practice military actions to make these actions become their lifestyle habits.

=== Actor Selection ===
When the shooting of "the Red Detachment of women" was about to start in 1961, the choice of the heroine "Qionghua" was still uncertain. In the play, Liang Xin describes a prominent feature of "Qionghua" which is "hot big eyes". As a result, to find that pair of "hot big eyes" has become Xie Jin's primary task. However, how many pairs of eyes have seen it, but the big eyes lingering in Xie Jin's mind for a long time have not appeared. One day, when Xie Jin was passing a classroom in Shanghai drama academy, he heard a young man and woman quarreling. I saw a girl student with eyes wide open. She was very excited to say something to a boy. A pair of hot big eyes, a face unforgiving appearance. With some anger and excitement, Xie Jin was moved by these eyes. Isn't this the "Qionghua" he has been looking for? Xie Jin learned that her name is Zhu Xijuan. He asked Liang Xin to come and have a look. Liang Xin was stunned at that time. Although the role of "Qionghua" is the combination of several revolutionaries, Zhu Xijuan seems to have similarities with each of them. Zhu Xijuan thus entered the Red Detachment of women crew.

=== The Deleted Romance ===
There was a love scene between Hong Changqing and Wu Qionghua in the script. In one episode, after the wedding ceremony of Hong Lian and Gui, Hong Lian, as the elder sister, encourages Wu Qionghua to talk with Hong Changqing. Wu Qionghua came to Hong Chang qing with a serious expression and said loudly, " I want to talk to you." The two then walked to the green hillside, pairs of lovers from time to time by their side, the song floating at the party faded and faded. Wu Qionghua took out a bag of betel nut and gave it to Hong Changqing, but Hong Changqing didn't pick it up. He said, "In our hometown, you can't pick up girls' things." Wu Qionghua is anxious. For this love scene, Xie Jin was originally ready to move on the screen. However, some comrades in the film crew raised different opinions, fearing that the film would have trouble censoring because of the love scenes in the film at that time. After consideration, Xie Jin felt that this concern was not unreasonable, and then the script was changed accordingly, showing that Wu Qionghua and Hong Changqing had become comrades from lovers. Still, there are glimpses of their love in the film. In that particular era, is also a different kind of amorous feelings.

=== Historical Site ===
To commemorate the 90th anniversary of the founding of the Party and the 80th anniversary of the founding of the Red Detachment of Women, the Red Detachment of Women inaugural meeting site in the old village committee of Yangjiang Town, Qionghai City, Hainan Province officially started reconstruction.

== Reception ==
In the late 1960s, Chinese Communist Party anthologies praised The Red Detachment of Women for its innovative combination of movement styles and its strong emotional effect on audiences. Commentators highlighted the ballet’s choreography, noting that its physical poses conveyed a "passionate proletarian spirit of resistance" and powerfully expressed the characters' inner lives. Art critic Hong Leping contrasted the work with Western ballets, which he viewed as in decline, and claimed that only under Mao Zedong's revolutionary leadership could the traditional form of dance drama be revitalized.

The 2005 documentary Yang Ban Xi: The Eight Model Works, directed by Yuen Yanting, features interviews with performers—musicians, composers, actors, and dancers—who toured with the model works across China during the 1960s and early 1970s. The interviewees recalled the widespread fame of these productions, noting how deeply they were embedded in popular culture. They also remembered how some rural audiences traveled long distances to attend performances and film screenings.

Recent scholarship has also examined the film's representation of gender. Scholars argue that while the film portrays women as revolutionary heroes and promotes female participation in political struggle, it also frames women's liberation primarily through collective socialist ideology rather than individual autonomy.

In the late 1990s and early 2000s, cultural scholar Barbara Mittler conducted interviews with people from various backgrounds about propaganda arts. Many respondents were reluctant to speak negatively about the model works, instead recalling the enjoyment they brought. Mittler observed that interviewees often sang or reenacted excerpts from the works, typically without irony or contempt. She argued that propaganda pieces like The Red Detachment of Women helped democratize formerly elite artistic genres, making them more appealing, entertaining, and culturally relevant to the general public.

== Awards ==
- 1st Hundred Flowers Awards
  - The film won the best picture, best director, best actress and best supporting actor of 1st Hundred Flowers Award in 1962. The film also won the ten best films of Chinese Film Century Award in 1995 along with films like The Goddess and Street Angels, demonstrating its continued recognition as a landmark work in Chinese film history.
- 3rd African, Asian and Latin American Film Festival
  - The film won the best actor and Wanlong prize in 3rd African and Asian Film Festival in 1964.

== Adaptations ==
=== Ballet ===
The story was turned into a ballet and later a Beijing opera during the Cultural Revolution. While it first drew Western attention for its gun-toting ballerinas, it is best known internationally for being performed for U.S. President Richard Nixon during his February 1972 trip to China. The ballet was immortalized on film in 1970 and is now considered a foundational work of Chinese indigenous ballet.

Scholar T. Craveiro notes that this film adaptation exemplifies the plural modality and media transposition strategies of cultural production in Maoist period, where multiple artistic forms like cinema and ballet were combined and reinterpreted to serve political and internationalize the national art in order to spread revolutionary ideas worldwide.

=== TV series ===
In 2006, at a time when the TV play had become the most influential genre in China's flourishing TV industry, and the revival of the Red Classics was in full swing, The Red Detachment of Women was remade as a 21-episode TV series as a collaborative production of Hainan Radio and TV, Beijing TV, Beijing TV Arts Centre, and the Eastern Magic Dragon Film Company under the direction of Yuan Jun.
