= Xue Jinghua =

Chinese ballerina (born 1945)

- 薛菁华
- Born: 7 October 1945 (age 79); Wuxi, Jiangsu, China
- Occupation(s): Ballet dancer (active until 1990); Chairperson and instructor at the Jinghua Dance and Arts Centre
- Known for: Red Detachment of Women

Xue Jinghua (Chinese: 薛菁华; pinyin: Xuē Jīnghuá; born October 7, 1946) is a Chinese ballerina who was cast in the now internationally well-known Red Detachment of Women of the National Ballet of China as Wu Qinghua, the heroine of the ballet for which she became a prima ballerina.

== Early life ==
Xue was born in Wuxi to a family of intellectuals. Her mother encouraged her to pursue the arts, particularly dance. When the Beijing Dance Academy invited a ballet instructor from the Soviet Union to teach in 1956, Xue's mother took her to Beijing to audition. Although Xue had never danced ballet before, she passed three exams and was enrolled in the programme.

== Dance career ==
=== National Ballet of China ===
Xue joined the National Ballet of China in 1963. She was relatively unknown as a ballerina prior to being cast in Red Detachment of Women. It has been reported that Jiang Qing saw Xue perform and exclaimed that she reminded her of herself at that age, advising the troupe to give the dancer a role. Xue was first cast as the company commander, then as the lead Wu Qinghua (Chinese: 吴清华). Alternatively, it has also been suggested that Zhou Enlai saw her perform as the company commander and recommended Xue be cast as the lead.

The film version of the ballet was released in 1971 in China, five years into the Cultural Revolution. Xue starred opposite Liu Qingtang, who was cast as Hong Changqing. As one of the Eight model plays, the film was shown across the country in every cinema, every factory, and every village in the following several years until 1976 when the Cultural Revolution officially ended. As a consequence of the film, Xue achieved nationwide fame. The role was quite demanding, as over half the film (42.25 minutes) featured Xue onstage, either performing solos, duets or ensemble pieces.

When Richard Nixon, the 37th President of the United States, visited China in 1972, he was entertained with a stage production of Red Detachment of Women, and Xue Jinghua performed as Wu Qinghua in the ballet.

Xue left the National Ballet in 1990.

=== Teaching ===
Xue taught dance at the Huaxia Art Center, Shenzhen from 1993 to 2015.

== Television ==
Xue appeared as a judge on the 2002 programme CCTV Dance Competition.
