= Zhu Xijuan =

Chinese film actress (born 1938)

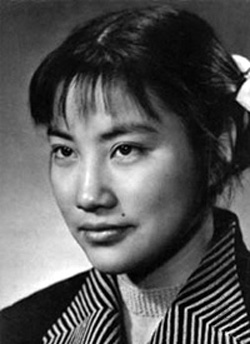
- Zhu Xijuan in 1962
- Born: 17 January 1938 (age 88); Ganzhou, Jiangxi, China
- Occupation: Actress
- Years active: 1960 – present
- Awards: Hundred Flowers Awards – Best Actress; 1962 The Red Detachment of Women

Chinese name
- Traditional Chinese: 祝希娟
- Simplified Chinese: 祝希娟
Transcriptions
Yue: Cantonese
- Jyutping: juk1 hei1 gyun1

Zhu Xijuan is a Chinese film actress. In 1960, Zhang graduated from Shanghai Drama Academy. After the audition of The Red Detachment of Women, she selected as the leading role, which directed by Chinese master Xie Jin. For this breakthrough performance, Zhu won Hundred Flowers Award for Best Actress. In 1962, Zhu listed in the "Ministry of Culture in recognition of the twenty-two stars" (新中国22大明星).

== Filmography ==
| Year | Title | Role | Notes |
|---|---|---|---|
| 1961 | The Red Detachment of Women | Wu Qionghua | Hundred Flowers Award for Best Actress |
| 1964 | Love of Green Mountain | Shan Que | |
| 1979 | Ah! Cradle | | |
| 1989 | The Last Aristocrats | Zhang's Mother | |
