= Li Chengxiang =

Chinese choreographer (1931–2018)

Li Chengxiang (Chinese: 李承祥; 1 October 1931 – 14 December 2018) was a Chinese ballet dancer, choreographer and educator. He was best known as one of the choreographers of Red Detachment of Women, one of the most influential ballets of China. He served as Director of the National Ballet of China and received the Lifetime Achievement Award by the China Dancers Association.

== Biography ==
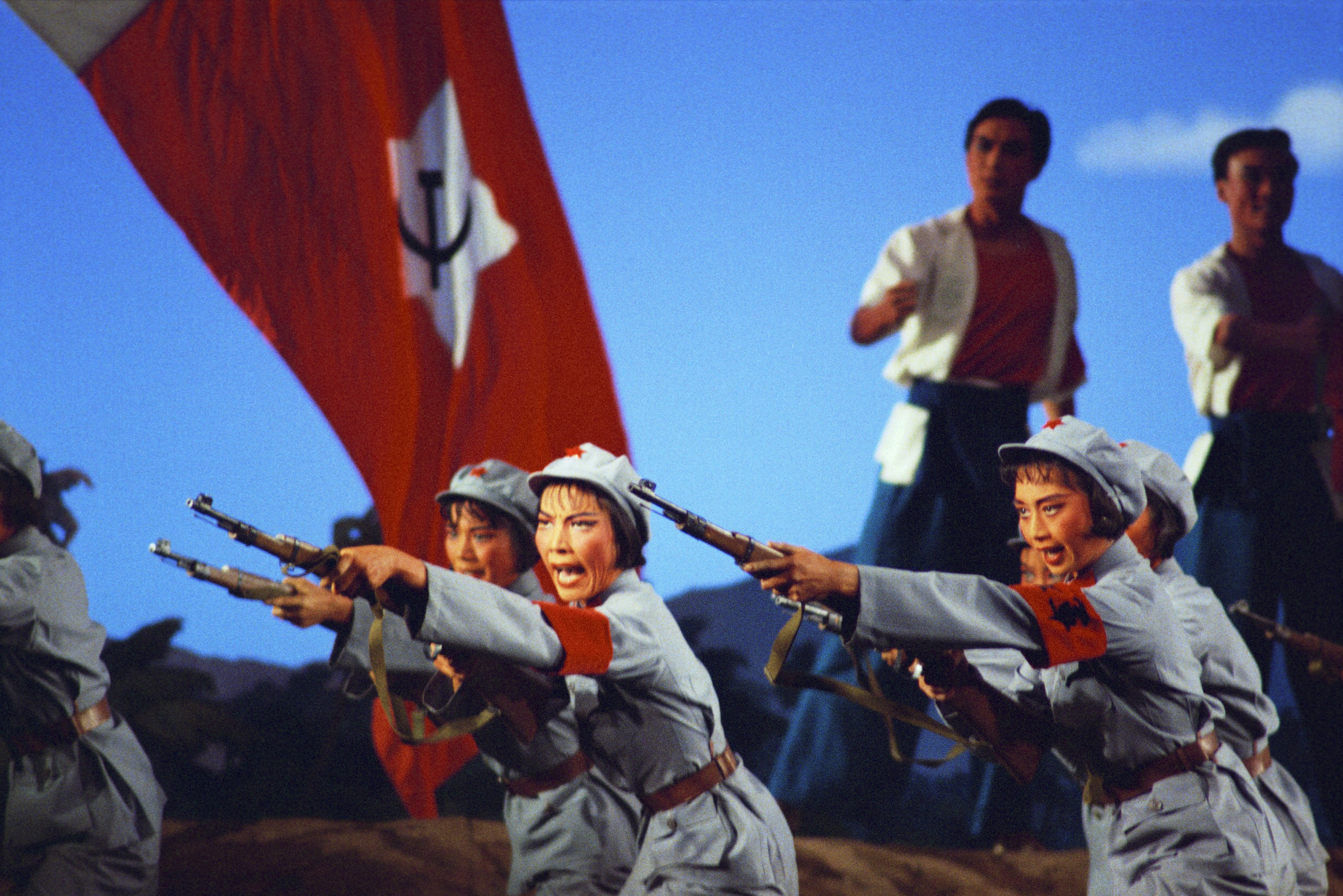
A scene from The Red Detachment of Women: soldiers of the Women's Detachment performing rifle drill in Act II, from the 1972 National Ballet of China production.

Li was born 1 October 1931 in Harbin, Heilongjiang province in Japanese-occupied Northeast China. He joined the Chinese Communist Party in March 1961.

Together with Jiang Zuhui (蒋祖慧) and Wang Xixian (王希贤), Li choreographed the ballet Red Detachment of Women, based on the popular 1961 film of the same name. It became one of the most influential ballets of China, now considered a "red classic". He also choreographed the ballet Mermaid.

He created or co-created the ballets Ode to Yimeng, Lin Daiyu, Yang Guifei, The Silk Road, Goddess of Luo, The Cowherd and the Weaver Girl, among others. He also performed in many ballets including Swan Lake, Giselle, Notre Dame de Paris, as well as Red Detachment of Women.

He served as Director of the National Ballet of China and trained many dancers. He received the Lifetime Achievement Award by the China Dancers Association. He was a delegate to the 4th National People's Congress.

Li died on 14 December 2018 at the Beijing Friendship Hospital, aged 87.
