= U.S.–China Policy Foundation =

Think tank based in Washington, D.C.

- Abbreviation: USCPF
- Formation: 1995
- Type: Non-governmental organization, think tank
- Tax ID no.: 52-1978307
- Headquarters: Washington, D.C., United States
- Revenue: $187,430 (2015)
- Expenses: $196,203 (2015)
- Website: www.uscpf.org

The U.S.–China Policy Foundation (USCPF) is a non-governmental organization in the United States that works to improve China–United States relations. The group believes that specific misunderstandings and misperceptions within both countries inhibit cooperation, and it seeks to discuss those. The group states that it does not advocate foreign policy decisions and does not try to influence government decisions.

== Activities and history ==
The late ambassadors of the United States John H. Holdridge and Arthur W. Hummel Jr. founded the group with Chi Wang in 1995. Throughout the 1990s and onwards, it assisted American businesses trying to work with the Chinese.
