= Red Detachment of Women (ballet) =

Chinese ballet

- Simplified Chinese: 红色娘子军
- Traditional Chinese: 紅色娘子軍
Transcriptions
Standard Mandarin
- Hanyu Pinyin: Hóngsè niángzǐ jūn
- Wade–Giles: Hung^{2}-se^{4} niang^{2}-tzu^{3} chün^{1}
- IPA: [xʊ̌ŋ.sɤ̂ njǎŋ.tsɨ̀ tɕýn]
Yue: Cantonese
- Jyutping: Hung^{4}-sik^{1} noeng^{4}-zi^{2} gwan^{1}

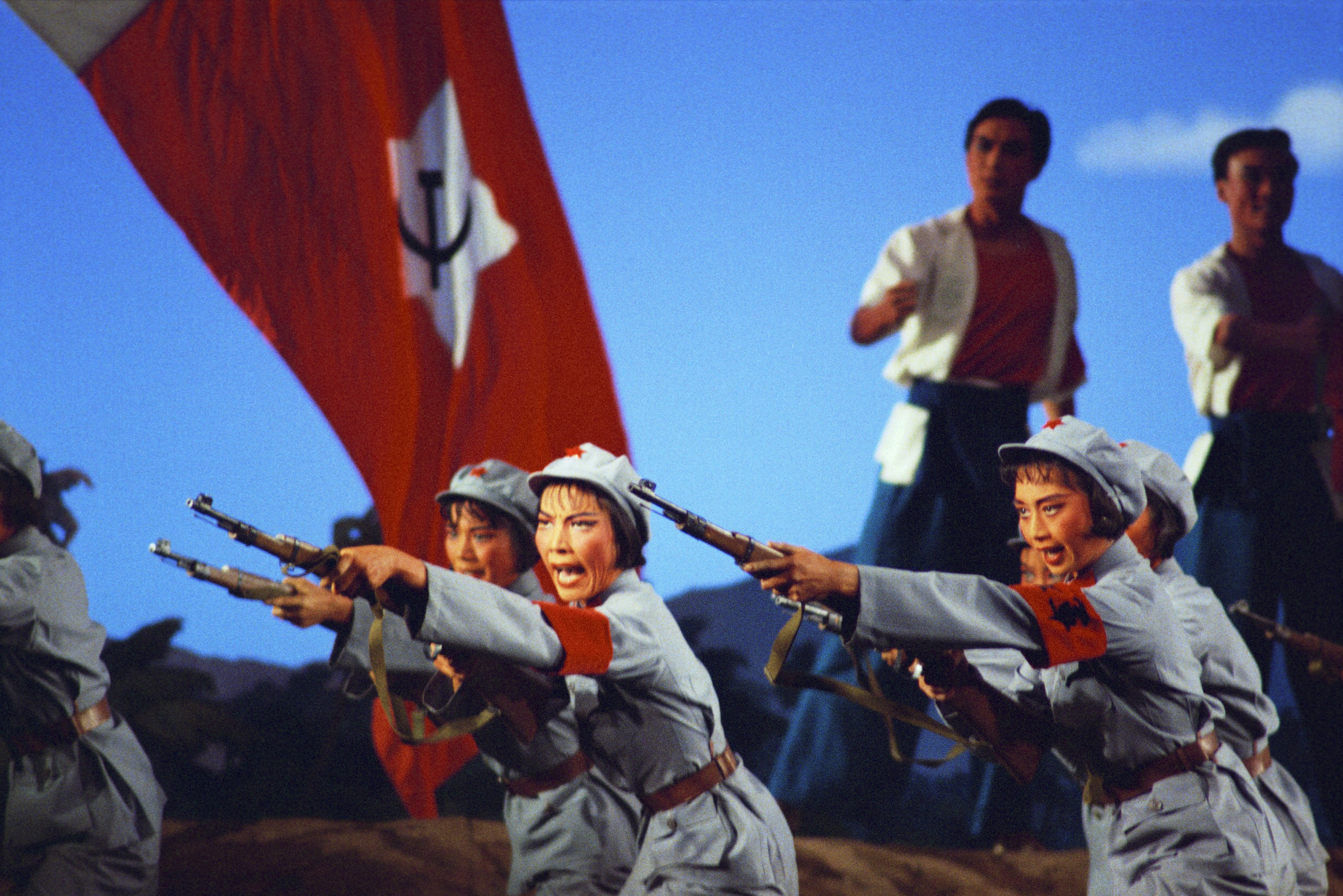
The Red Detachment of Women. Soldiers of the Women's Detachment performing rifle drill in Act II, from the 1972 National Ballet of China production.

The Red Detachment of Women (Chinese: 红色娘子军; pinyin: Hóngsè niángzǐ jūn) is a Chinese ballet which premiered in 1964 and was made one of the Eight Model Operas which dominated the national stage during the Cultural Revolution.

== Background and development ==
Adapted from the earlier 1961 film of the same title under the personal direction of Zhou Enlai, which in turn adapted from the novel by Liang Xin, it depicts the liberation of a peasant girl in Hainan Island and her rise in the Chinese Communist Party. The novel was based on the true stories of the 100+ member strong all-female Special Company of the 2nd Independent Division of Chinese Red Army, first formed in May 1931. As the communist base in Hainan was destroyed by the nationalists, most of the members of the female detachment survived, partially because they were women and easier to hide among the local populace who were sympathetic to their cause. After the communist victory in China, the representatives of the surviving members were taken to Beijing and personally inspected and praised by Mao Zedong. In 2014, Lu Yexiang, the last member of red detachment of women, died in Qionghai, Hainan.

The ballet was later adapted to a Beijing opera in 1964, and as with the ballet itself, both stage and film versions were produced. The 1970 film version of the ballet made Xue Jinghua (as Wu Qinghua) and Liu Qingtang (as Hong Changqing) superstars along with a dozen other artists who were cast as protagonists in other model plays of the time. It is one of the so-called eight model plays in China during the Cultural Revolution (1966–1976). With The White Haired Girl, it is regarded as a revolutionary Chinese ballet, and its music is familiar to almost every Chinese person who grew up during that time. It was made into a film in 1972 again, and is now part of the permanent repertoire of the National Ballet of China. It remains a favorite of music and ballet lovers nearly 50 years after the Cultural Revolution in China. It is often performed for International Women's Day.

It was collaboratively created by: with music by Du Mingxin, Wu Zuqiang, Wang Yanqiao, Shi Wanchun and Dai Hongwei, and choreography by Li Chengxiang, Jiang Zuhui and Wang Xixian. Many numbers were based on the folk songs of Hainan Island, a place that, with its coconut trees rustling in tropical wind, evokes much romantic ethos. Though there are unmistakable elements of Chinese music, the music of this ballet was performed with basically a Western symphony orchestra.

On 25 December 2015 Chinese Choreographer Wen Hui, the German Director and Dramaturge Kai Tuchmann, and the author Zhuang Jiayun premiered their work RED at the Power Station of Art in Shanghai. RED is a reinterpretation of The Red Detachment of Women and it analyses this model opera/ballet as a politico-cultural symbol that became part of the collective consciousness during the Cultural Revolution. Since its premiere in China, RED is touring around Asia and Europe.

== Synopsis ==
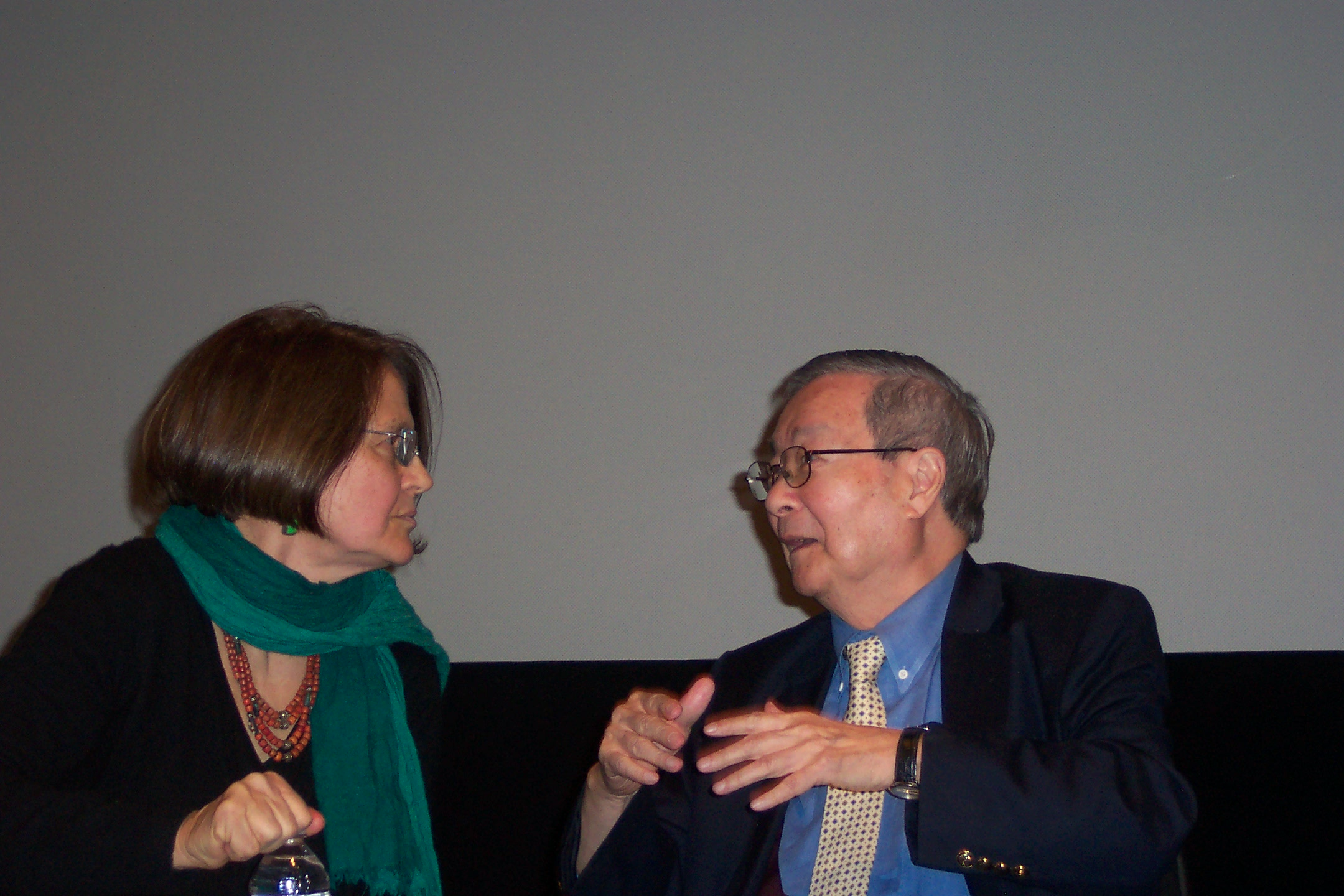
Panel discussion on the Red Detachment of Women on 11 November 2012 at Freer Gallery with Dr. Carma Hinton (left), Dr. Chi Wang (right)

Place: Yelinzhai ("Stronghold of the coconut woods"), Hainan Island, China
Time: The Ten-Year Civil War (1927-1937)

Main Characters:

- Hong Changqing (洪常青), Commissar of the Red Detachment of Women, disguised as a merchant
- Wu Qinghua (吳清華) - daughter of a peasant and servant girl of NanBatian, later a soldier, and finally the Commissar
- Lian Zhang (连长), literally the Company Commander
- Xiao Pang (小庞)," Little Pang the Messenger
- NanBatian (南霸天) - lit "the Tyrant of the South", a despotic landlord
- Ou Guangsi (Lao Si) (老四) - NanBatian's Lackey

=== Prologue ===
In his dungeon, Nanbatian, the despotic landlord, has imprisoned his tenants who are unable to pay their exorbitant rents. Wu Qinghua, daughter of a poor peasant, is chained to a column. Lao Si comes with the order of Nanbatian to sell Wu. Lao Si releases Wu from the chain. While Lao Si is in an unguarded moment, Wu kicks him, and he loses his balance and falls. Wu manages to escape while two other inmates hold Lao Si to the ground.

Major numbers:

- Pas de deux of two inmates

=== Act I ===
Immediately after the prologue. Night has fallen in the coconut forest and Wu Qinghua is desperately running away from Lao Si and his lackeys. She is soon recaptured. Nanbatian and his entourage arrive. The Tyrant whips Wu until she loses consciousness. A thunderstorm approaches, so Nanbatian and his followers leave and Wu is left for dead.

Hong Changqing, the Commissar, and Xiao Pang, the Messenger, who are on a reconnaissance mission in disguise, pass by. They save Wu and point her the way to the camp of the Red Army.

Major numbers:

- Dance of Lao Si and his lackeys
- Wu Qinghua's Solo No. 1
- Wu Qinghua's fight with Lao Si
- Wu Qinghua's fight with Nanbatian
- Group dance of slaves
- Wu Qinghua's Solo No. 2
- Pas de trois of Hong Changqing, Wu Qinghua and Xiao Pang

=== Act II ===
In the camp of the Red Army beside the Wanquan River, a newly formed Detachment of Women is being trained. Wu Qinghua arrives to meet Hong Changqing and Xiao Pang, who introduce her to others. In a solo dance, Wu tells the Red Army soldiers the enormity of Nanbatian's crimes. She then ceremoniously receives a rifle and is accepted as a member of the Women's Detachment. With determination, they plan to liberate the peasants and slave girls under the oppression of Nanbatian.

Major numbers:

- Group dance of the Detachment members
- Rifle drill of the Detachment members
- Hong Changqing's bayonet dance
- Group bayonet dance of the Detachment members
- A young women soldier's solo
- Five-inch dagger dance of the Red Guards
- Group dance of all
- Wu Qinghua's solo

=== Act III ===
In the luxurious manor of Nanbatian, an extravagant birthday celebration for the Tyrant is going on in the garden before his house. Mountains of gifts are brought in; visitors are arriving, Li girls are driven in with whips at their backs to dance for the guests.

Hong Changqing, disguised as a wealthy merchant from Southeast Asia, arrives on the scene, calm and dignified, to congratulate Nanbatian on his birthday. Meanwhile, the members of the Women's Detachment have secretly gathered around the manor of the Tyrant. It has been agreed that Hong is to fire his gun at midnight as signal for the Detachment to break in to wipe out the Tyrant and his gang in one fell swoop.

At night, all people recede into the houses. Nanbatian comes out to see some of his guests off. Overcome by deep personal hatred, Wu Qinghua shoots Nanbatian, prematurely issuing the battle signal. Nanbatian is merely wounded and escapes from a secret tunnel with a few of his lackeys.

Nanbatian's prisons are opened, and the prisoners are liberated. Hong leads them in opening the granary of the Tyrant and distributing the grain.

Wu is reprimanded for her blunder, and her gun is removed from her.

Major numbers:

- Group dance of slaves
- Li Girls' dance
- Broadsword dance of Nanbatian's lackeys
- Xiao Pang's solo
- Pas de deux of Wu Qinghua and her comrade-in-arm
- Opening the granary and distributing grain

=== Act IV ===
Back in the camp of the Red Army. Hong Changqing, the Commissar, is giving a lecture to the soldiers in the early morning. Wu Qinghua comes to grips with her mistake. Hong and the Company Commander are pleased to see Wu's progress. The Company Commander returns the gun to her, and together they practice marksmanship and grenade throwing.

The local people visit the Red Army and present them with doulis and lichees.

Suddenly, the sound of cannons is heard and Xiao Pang, the Messenger, arrives on horseback with the information that Nanbatian has assembled a large number of troops, and they are on their way to attack the base of the Red Army. The members of the Detachment immediately bid goodbye to their dear ones and set out to the battle field.

Major numbers:

- Hong Changqing's solo
- Group dance of the soldiers
- Wu Qinghua's solo
- Pas de deux of Wu Qinghua and Company Commander No. 1
- Dance of five female soldiers and the head cook
- Douli Dance
- Pas de deux of Wu Qinghua and Company Commander No. 2
- Dance of Hong Changqing and male soldiers
- Group dance of all

=== Act V ===
On the battlefield at a mountain pass. In order to annihilate the enemy's effective power, the main force of the Red Army strategically shifts to the rear of the enemy, and the Company Commander leads most of the members of the Detachment in moving away with the main force. Hong Changqing and a small group of Red Army soldiers and Red Guards form a covering force to divert the enemy. After a series of fierce fights, the goal is achieved.

As they prepare to withdraw, the enemy starts yet another attack. Hong gives his portfolio to Wu Qinghua and orders her and other members to retreat while he and only two other soldiers stay behind to fend off the enemy.

Hong's two comrades-in-arms are killed and he himself is captured.

Major numbers:

- Dance of Wu Qinghua and other soldiers
- Wu Qinghua's fight with an enemy
- Fight between two soldiers and two enemies
- Red flag dance
- Dance of Hong Changqing and two comrades-in-arm
- Dance of Hong Changqing and two enemies

=== Entr'acte ===
The main force of the Red Army is pressing forward with the momentum of an avalanche. Their group dance.

A memorable moment in the entr'acte is the precisely synchronized grand jete of the Red Army soldiers crossing the stage in a seemingly endless line, suggesting they are as fast as an arrow flying in the air.

Major numbers:

- Group dance of the Red Army soldiers
- Sequence of synchronized grand jeté

=== Act VI ===
In the lair of the Tyrant, Nanbatian and his lackeys are panic-stricken knowing that their end is approaching. The Tyrant runs out all his means to force Hong Changqing to surrender, but the Commissar vehemently denounces the enemy. Nanbatian threatens Hong with death, but the hero remains steadfast. At the end, Hong is burnt in a horrid fire under the giant banyan tree amidst a chorus of the Internationale, and he dies a martyr's death.

The main force of the Red Army has won their battle with the enemy. They storm the hideout of the Tyrant and kill him and his lackeys.

The Red Army emancipates Nanbatian's prisoners and Yelinzhai is liberated.

Wu Qinghua and the Company Commander look everywhere for Hong and find the truth. They all kneel in front of the place where Hong has died to pay their respects to the hero.

The Red Army Battalion Commander announces that Wu will succeed Hong as the Commissar of the Women's Detachment. Wu takes over Hong's portfolio, and she and her comrades-in-arm will continue their revolutionary cause.

Major numbers:

- Dance of Nanbatian and Lao Si
- Hong Changqing's solo
- Hong Changqing dying a martyr's death
- Red Army's assault on Nanbatian's lair
- Celebration of liberation
- Pas de deux of Wu Qinghua and Company Commander
- Mourning the martyr
- Group dance and the tableau vivant at the end

== In literature ==
The revolutionary ballet is a motif around which develops Jiang Yun's novella, The Red Detachment of Women. From Jiang Yun's story, the French author Maël Renouard borrows the name of a fictional character, Tang Meiyu, in his Peking Opera Reform.

== In popular culture ==
Images of dancers performing The Red Detachment of Women appear as a theme in the work of visual artists Hung Liu, who grew up in Changchun China but settled in Oakland California. The French film Chinese in Paris has a six minute long "play-within-a-play", that hybridizes the ballet The Red Detachment of Women with the French opera Carmen, calling the production "Carmeng". The second act of the opera Nixon in China by American composer John Adams takes place in part at a performance of The Red Detachment of Women.

== Other influence ==
The Red Detachment of Women Memorial Park in Qionghai was developed in 1998. The park includes revolutionary-themed sculpture, a museum, coconut groves, and live performances.

== Images ==
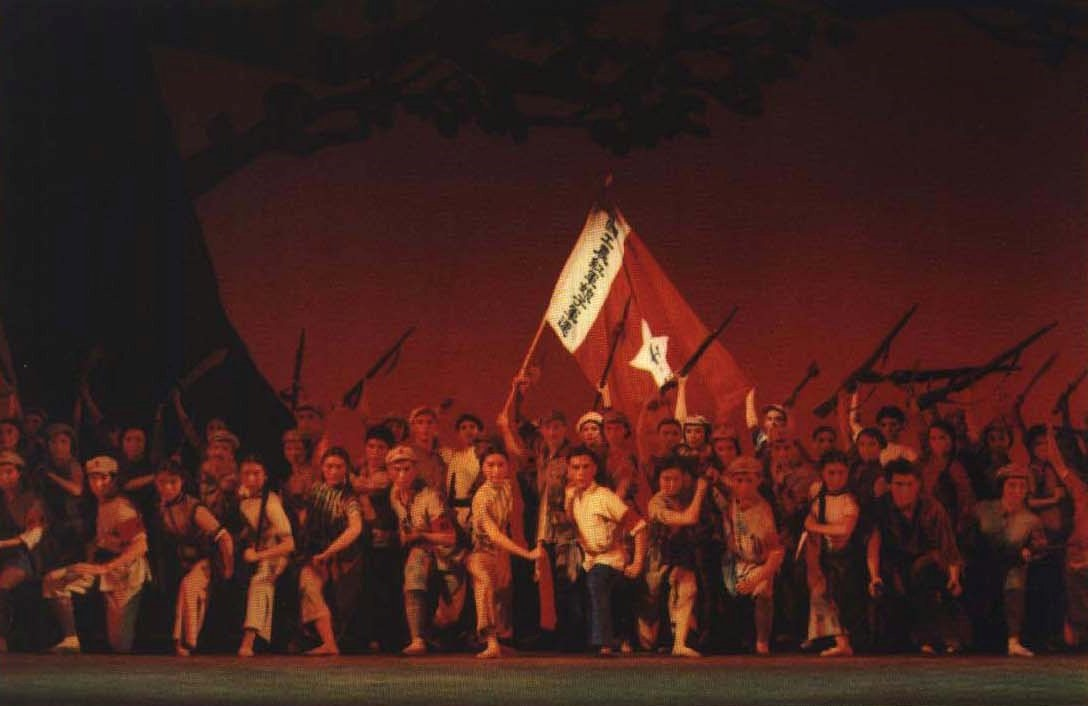
1965

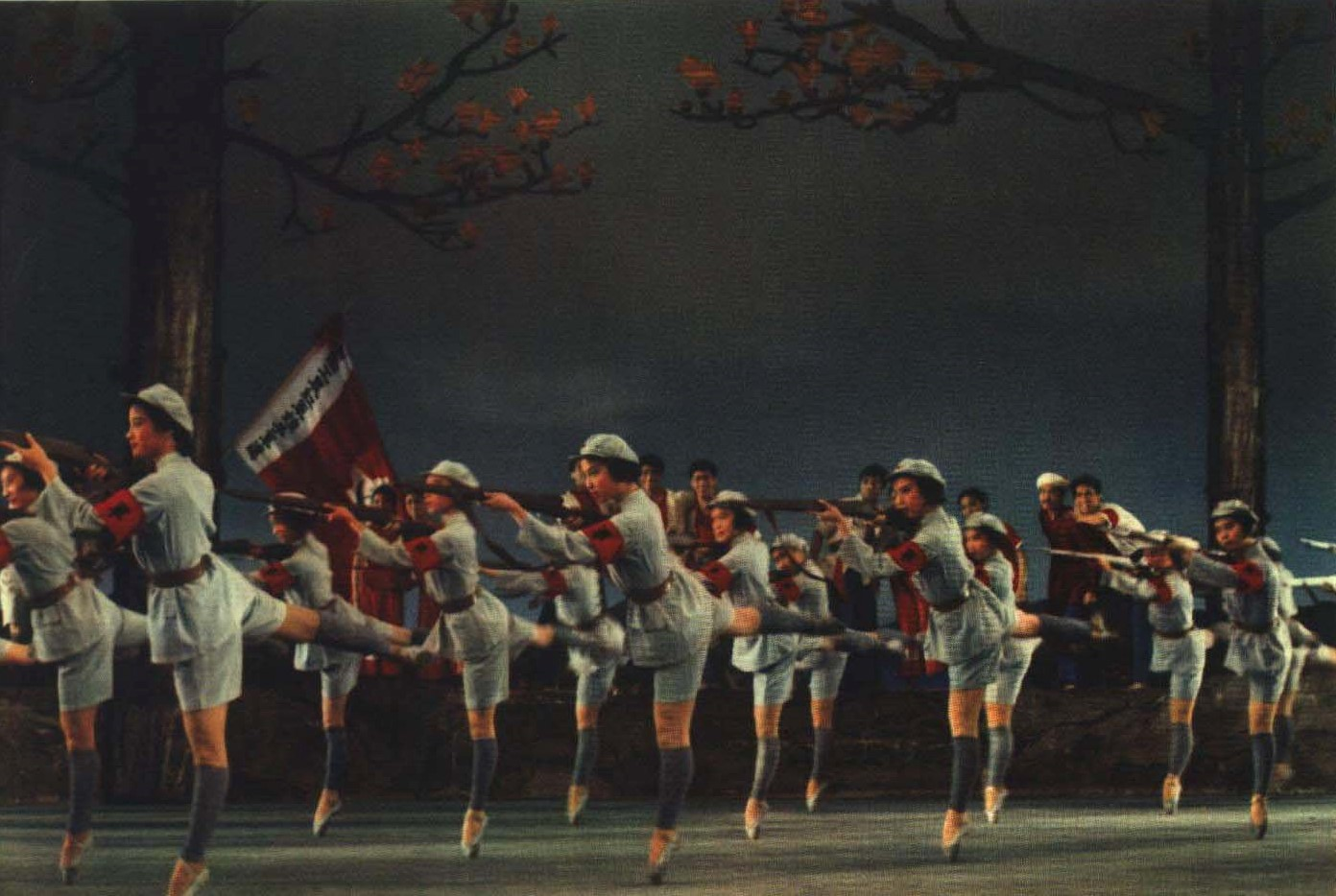
1965

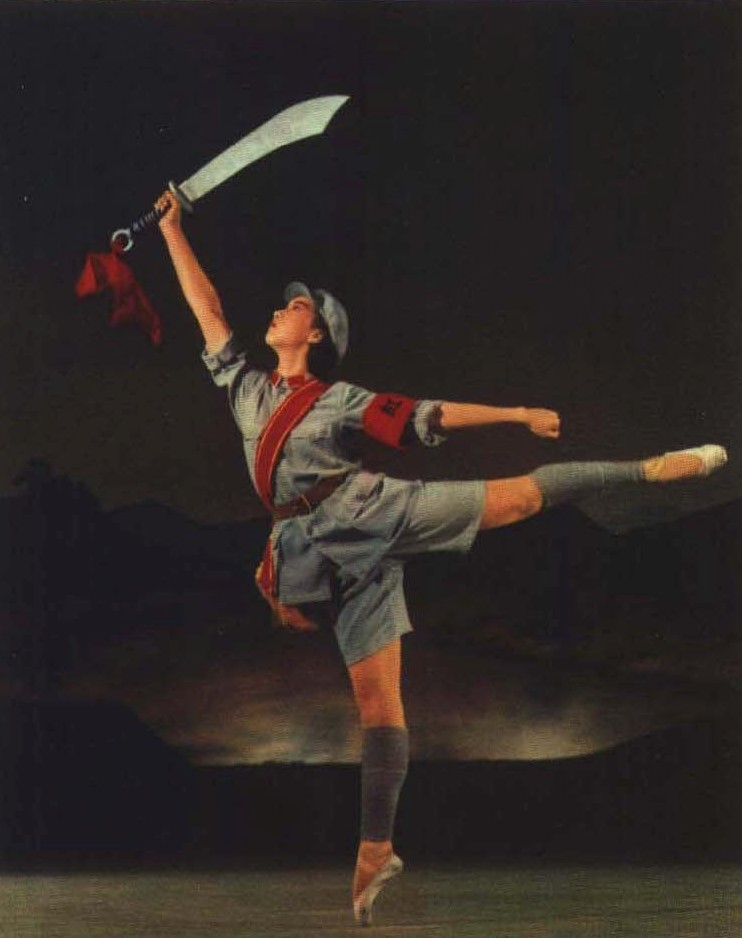
1965

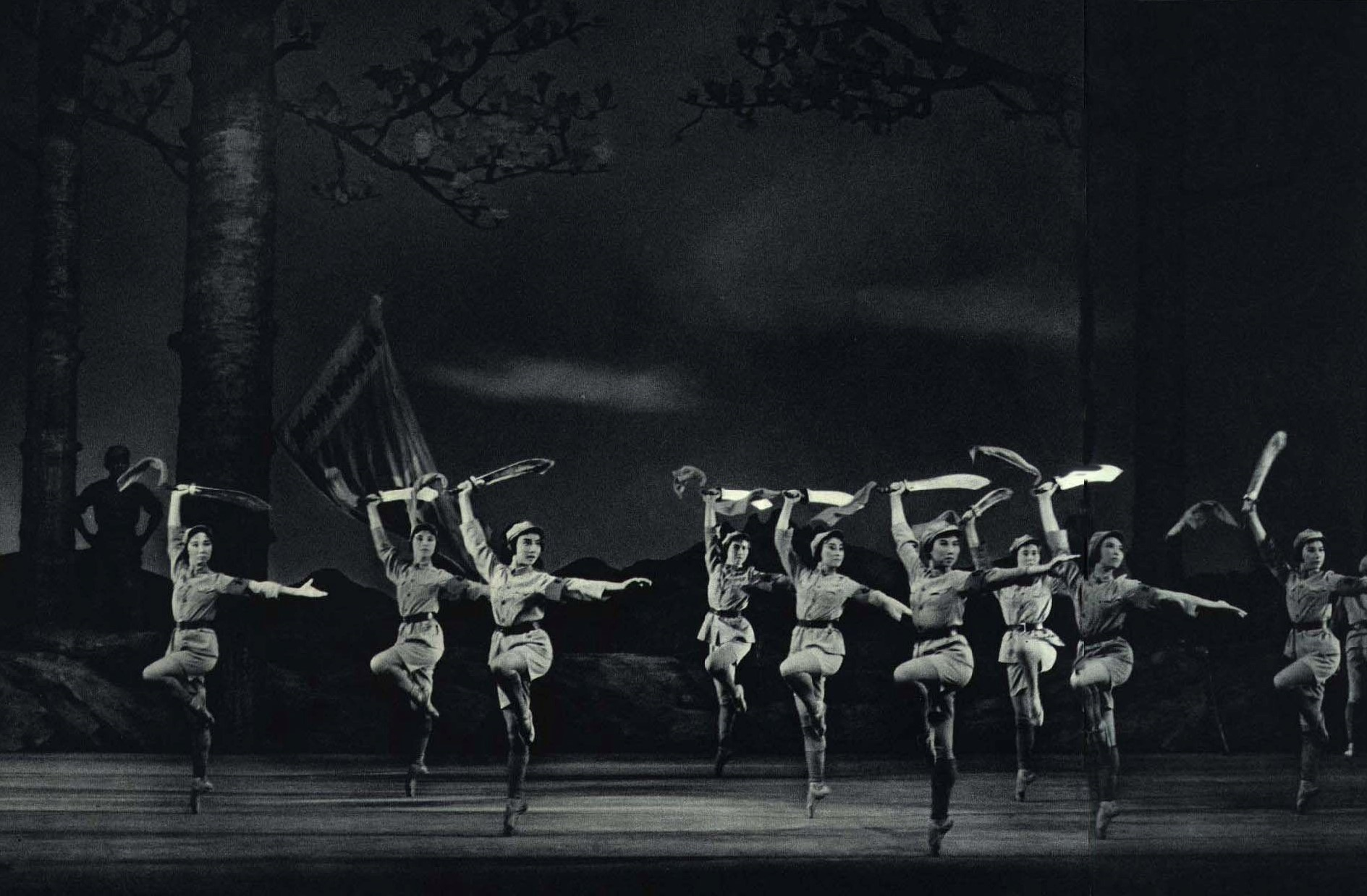
1967

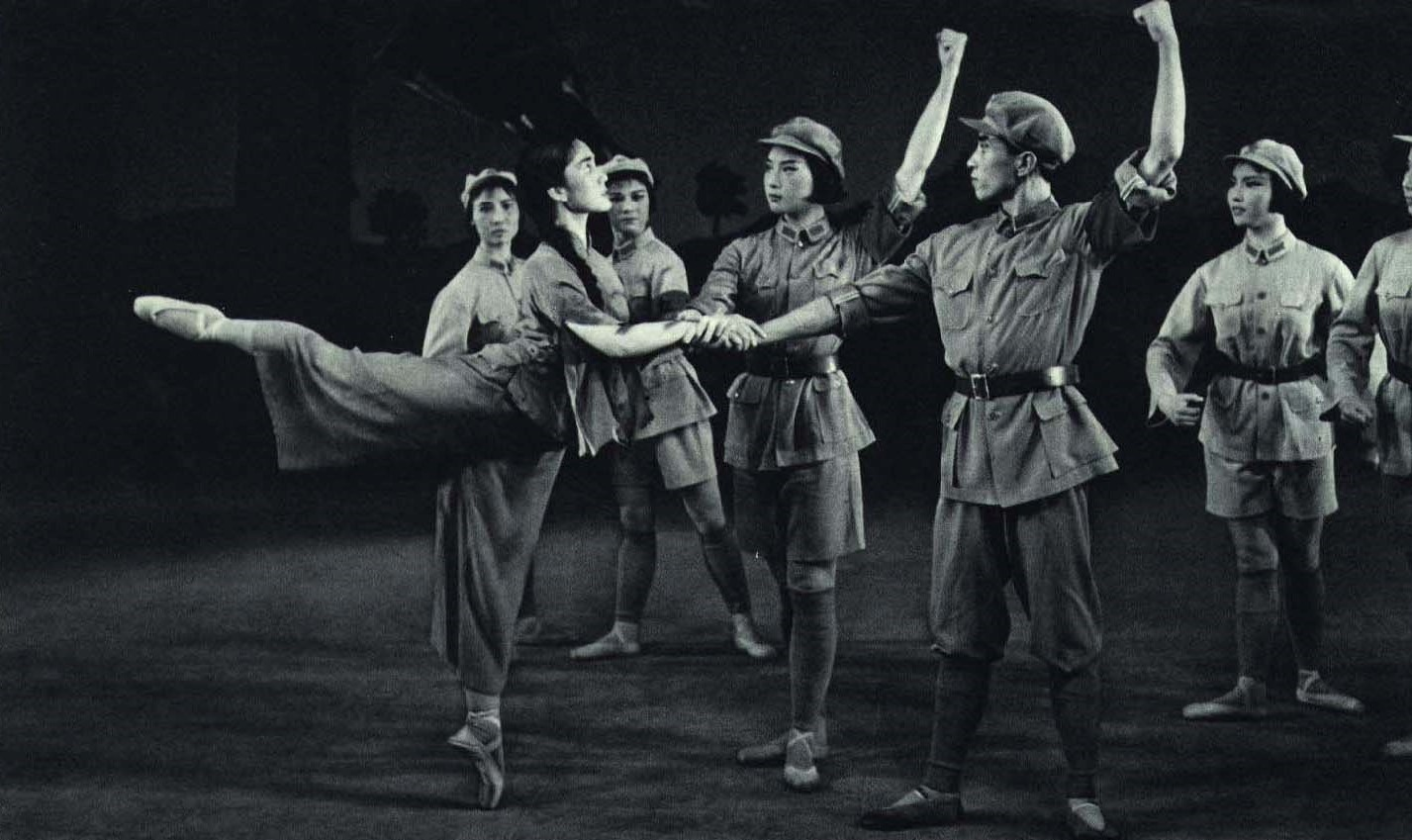
1967

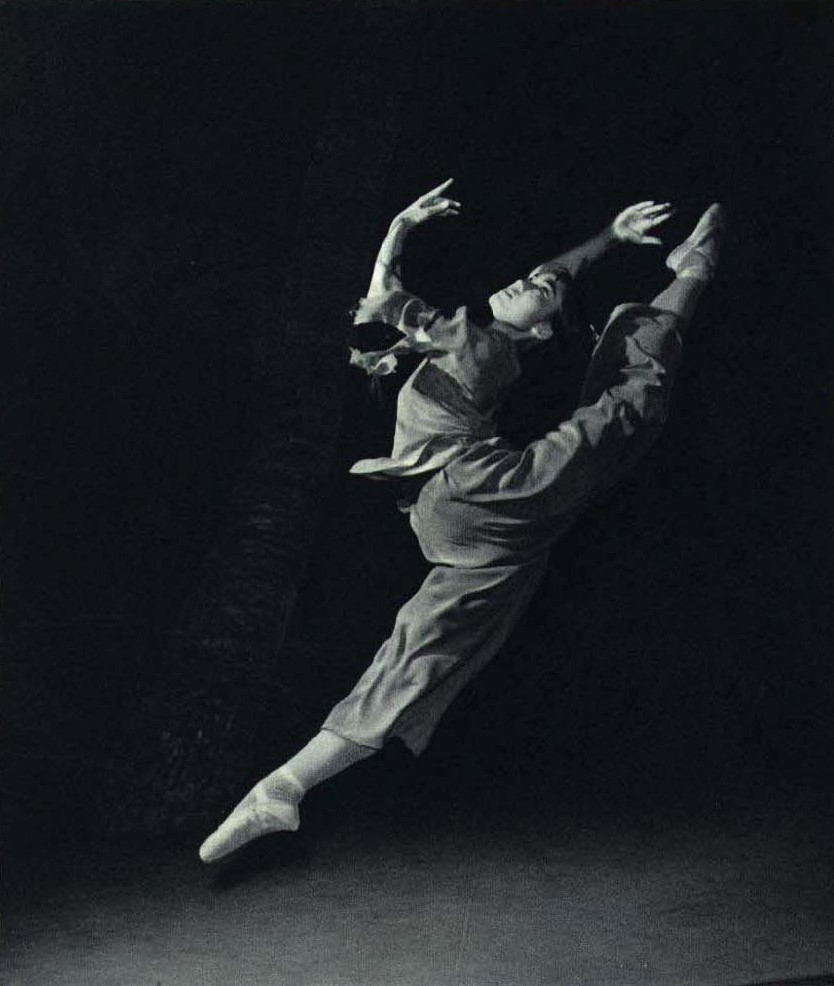
1967

== See also ==
- List of ballets by title
- Nixon in China opera
