= Chi Wang =

Chinese-American academic (1930–2024)

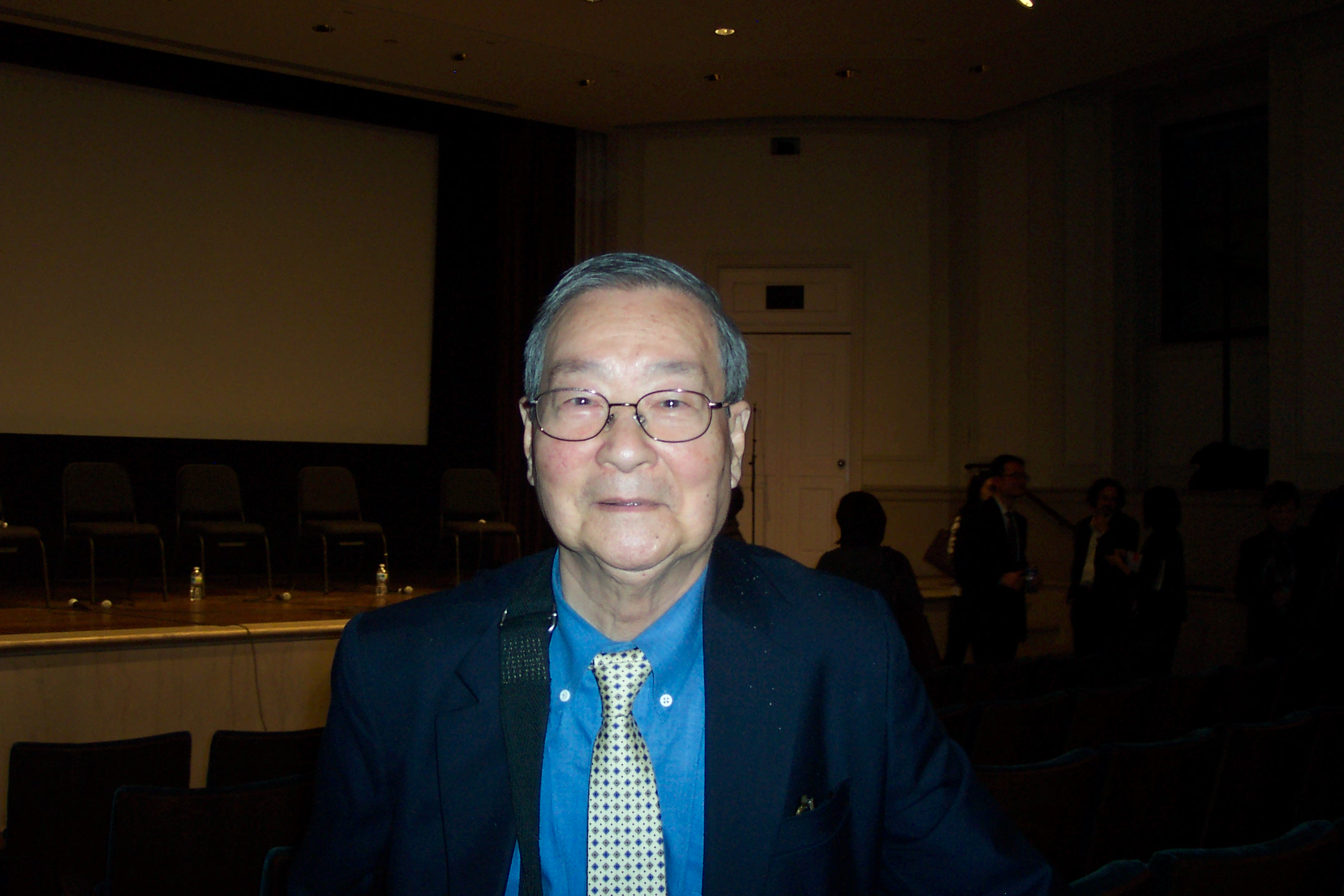
- Panel member at Freer Gallery on 11 November 2012
- Born: 1930
- Died: June 28, 2024 (aged 94); Woodburn, Virginia, U.S.
- Education: University of Maryland Georgetown University, PhD
- Occupations: Founder and Co-chair of the U.S.-China Policy Foundation
- Spouse: Ernestine Wang
- Children: 1

Chinese name
- Chinese: 王冀
Transcriptions
Standard Mandarin
- Hanyu Pinyin: Wáng Jì
- Wade–Giles: Wang Chi
- Website: www.uscpf.org

Chi Wang (1930 – June 28, 2024) was a Chinese-American professor of U.S.-China relations and modern China at Georgetown University, where he contributed to the establishment of Georgetown's PhD program in Asian History and was co-chair of the U.S.-China Policy Foundation. Established in 1995, the foundation supports various activities through its Committee for U.S. Libraries and Museum Exchange. At Georgetown, Wang also contributed to the establishment of Georgetown's PhD program in Asian History. Wang was the head of the Chinese Section at Library of Congress and worked in the field of librarianship for forty-eight years before retiring from LC in October 2004.

== Background ==
Wang was born in 1930. His father, Wang Shuchang was a general of the Northeastern Army. As a child, Wang lived in Peking. Following the onset of the Second Sino-Japanese War, he moved with his family across Henan, Hebei, Hong Kong and Shanghai. He returned to Peking after the attack on Pearl Harbor.

In 1949, Wang left China to study in the United States, where he received high school, college, and graduate education. He obtained a Bachelor's degree in agriculture from the University of Maryland, and his PhD at Georgetown University in 1969.

Wang died after a long illness in Woodburn, Virginia, on June 28, 2024, at the age of 94.

== Career ==
Wang began his career at the Library of Congress in 1956 to work on a microfilm project. In 1958, he became a cataloguer in the newly established Far Eastern Languages Section where he was asked to head up an innovative project to use a photocomposing machine that the Library just purchased from Japan to produce catalog cards with CJK (Chinese, Japanese and Korean) scripts, which put the practice of hand-copying CJK characters to cards to an end: quite a technological breakthrough at the time.

Shortly after his appointment in the Far Eastern Languages Section, the LC received funding from the National Science Foundation to strengthen its Asian collections in science and technology. Wang was recruited by the Science and Technology Division to supervise its Asian Science Unit. In that position, he helped the Library to develop a core collection of science and technology in Chinese, Japanese, and Korean languages. Wang's collection has since become one of the most comprehensive collections of such material outside of Asia, consisting of over one million volumes.

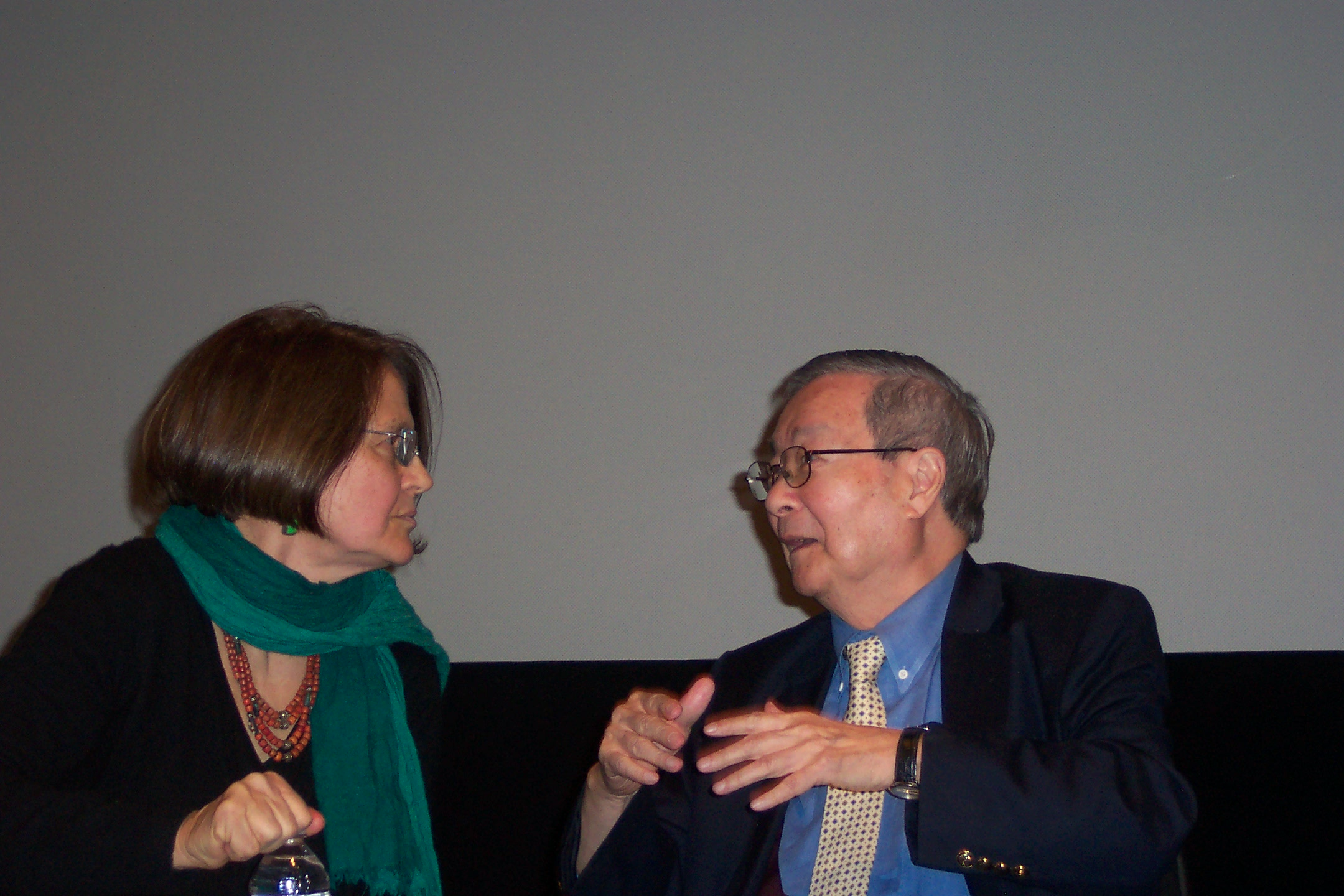
Panel discussion on The Red Detachment of Women on 11 November 2012 at Freer Gallery with Carma Hinton (left), Chi Wang (right)

Wang also compiled three bibliographies in the 1960s: 1) Chinese Scientific and Technical Serial Publications in the Collections of the Library of Congress, 2) Mainland China Organizations of Higher Learning in Science and Technology and their Publication: a Selected Guide, and 3) Nuclear Science in Mainland China.

In 1967, Wang moved to the Orientalia Division (later changed to the Asian Division) and served as Assistant Head of the Chinese and Korean Section. While purchasing publications directly from China was not possible at the time, he worked with the section Head K.T. Wu, a Chinese studies scholar/librarian, to strengthen contacts with vendors and exchange partners in Hong Kong and Taiwan to develop the library's collection on modern China. In 1969, after seven years of attending evening classes, he earned his doctoral degree in East Asian History from Georgetown University with minors in American Diplomacy and Soviet Foreign Policy. After receiving his doctorate, Wang began his part-time teaching career at Georgetown University. He taught courses and advised graduate students in International Relations and Chinese History and Diplomacy.

In 1971, Wang was invited to serve as Librarian at the Chinese University of Hong Kong. Granted two years' leave from LC, he led the CUHK Library in building a new library system at the new campus in Shatin. He introduced the use of Library of Congress classification schemes and AACR2 in Hong Kong.

In 1972, he represented the U.S government in negotiations to reestablish cultural ties with China. This trip led to a publication exchange between the Library of Congress and the National Library of Beijing.

In 1975 when Wu retired, Wang became the Head of the Chinese and Korean Section at the Library of Congress. During his tenure as the Assistant Head and Head of the Chinese and Korean Section, the Library of Congress's Chinese collection was greatly expanded. In the late 1960s, it possessed about 350,000 volumes of Chinese materials. In 2004, this number grew to nearly one million volumes.

Wang chaired the Council on East Asian Libraries (CEAL) Chinese Materials Committee from 1989 to 1995, and served on the ALA International Relations Roundtable.

Shortly after President Richard Nixon's visit to Beijing in 1972, he was invited by the Chinese government to travel to Beijing to establish the publication exchange between the Library of Congress and the National Library of Peking, followed by signing of a formal exchange agreement in 1979.

In 1979 he helped in arranging the first American librarians' delegation to visit China, headed by William J. Welsh, Deputy Librarian of Congress. From the 1980s through 2001, Wang led six American delegations of East Asian librarians from U.S. and Canada to visit China. He also helped in establishing a librarian exchange program between the Library of Congress and Chinese libraries in 1982 with the support from the Council on Library Resources. In 1992, the National Library of Peking (now National Library of China), presented Wang with an award for his contributions in promoting international exchanges. Later he was named an advisor of the National Library of China.

From February 25 to March 20 of 2013, several dozen Chinese scrolls owned by Wang were displayed at the George Mason University Art Gallery.
