= National Ballet of China =

National ballet company of China

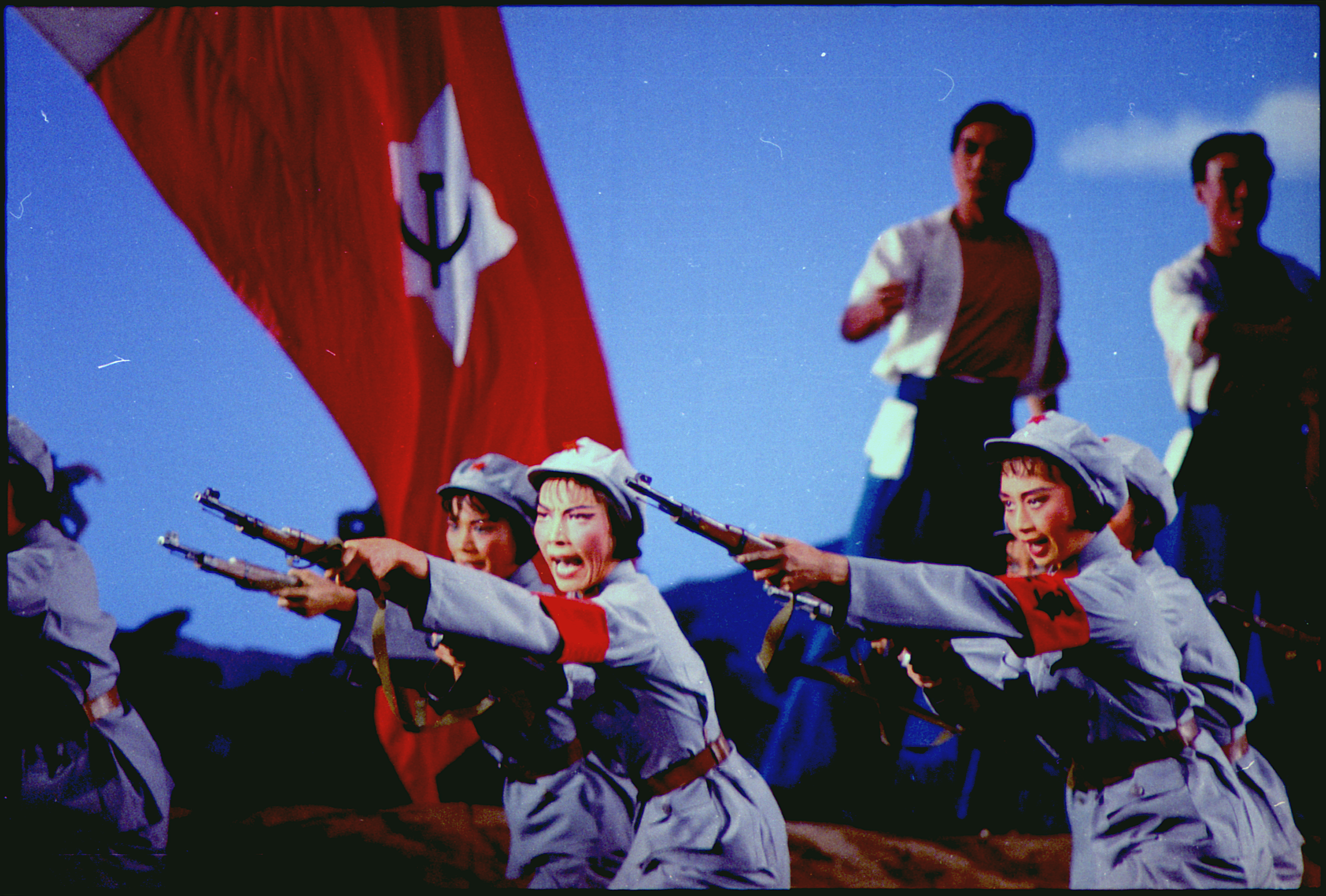
Performance of The Red Detachment of Women during Nixon's visit to China in 1972

The National Ballet of China (NBC), known in China as the Central Ballet Troupe, is the national ballet company of the People's Republic of China. It was founded on 31 December 1959.

The ballet company works from the Tianqiao Theater, which was specifically built for NBC in 1959 renovated in 2001. This theatre is one of a handful of such theatres in China that specialize in ballet and opera performances.

== History ==
In 1954, the first ballet school in China, Beijing Dance School, was established, and in the following years ballets such as Swan Lake and Romeo and Juliet were performed. Later in 1959 the National Ballet of China was founded as the Experimental Ballet Company of the Beijing Dance School. Two persons made their mark on both the school and the company - Dai Ailian who was the principal of the school and one of the ballet company directors, and Pyotr Gusev who instituted the Russian training system that formed the technical foundation for the company.

During the Cultural Revolution, the company came under the control of Madame Mao and Dai Ailian was sidelined. In this period, Revolutionary Model dramas came to the fore, and the repertory of the company was eventually reduced to two sanctioned ballets - The Red Detachment of Women and The White Haired Girl. After the fall of the Gang of Four in 1976, Ailian returned as director until 1980 and then continued as artistic adviser. The ballet company began to reform and change direction with classical Western ballet repertoire resurrected, and it also broadened its range to include more modern ballets from around the world. In 1994, Zhao Ruheng (赵汝蘅), who had been a company dancer since 1959, took over as its artistic director. In 2009, Feng Ying was appointed artistic director of the company.

== The Company ==
The current director is Feng Ying (冯英), with Wang Quanxing (王全兴) as deputy, and Wang Caijun (王才军) the répétiteur. The company has its own orchestra, which is directed and conducted by Zhang Yi (张艺). Former directors include choreographer Li Chengxiang.

The company employs over 70 dancers. Many NBC dancers have won gold, silver and bronze medals at various international ballet competitions.

=== Principal dancers (2018–2019) ===
- Zhang Jian (张剑)
- Wang Qimin (王启敏)
- Ma Xiaodong (马晓东）

== Repertoire ==
NBC has toured internationally and produced and performed many Chinese and Western ballets. According to its current director Feng Ying, there are three components in the repertoire of the company: Chinese ballets, 19th century Western classic, and 20th century ballet. They have also collaborated on contemporary dance pieces. Their repertoire includes:

=== Chinese works ===
- Red Detachment of Women
- Raise the Red Lantern
- Song of the Yimeng Mountain
- Ambush from Ten Sides
- Yellow River
- Liang Zhu
- The New Year Sacrifice
- The Wedding Chamber
- The Peony Pavilion

=== Western works ===
- Swan Lake
- Giselle
- Coppélia
- Don Quixote
- Le Corsaire
- The Rite of Spring
- La Fille Mal Gardée
- The Sleeping Beauty
- Pas de Quatre
