= Liu Qingtang =

Chinese ballet dancer

Liu Qingtang (Chinese: 刘庆棠; pinyin: Líu Qìngtáng; 1932 – May 2, 2010) was a Chinese ballet dancer who became famous for playing the role of Hong Changqing in the ballet Red Detachment of Women, one of the eight model plays during the Cultural Revolution. He was elevated to Vice Minister of Culture in 1975.

Liu was born in Gai County, Liaoning Province in 1932. He joined the art troupe of the People's Liberation Army in late 1940s, and after the foundation of the People's Republic of China in 1949, he studied ethnic dances and ballet in Beijing and the Soviet Union.

In 1958, Liu became well known in the ballet circuit in China for his rendition of the prince Ziegfried in Swan Lake.

In 1964, Liu was cast as Hong Changqing in Red Detachment of Women. This was a task of more politics than of art, as this work was under the auspices and supervision of Jiang Qing, wife of Mao Zedong. The film version of the ballet was released in 1971, and Liu became a household name.

His prominent quality as a ballet dancer and his political savvy enabled him to make leaps and bounds in his political career as well. In February, 1976, Liu was nominated by Jiang Qing and Zhang Chunqiao for the vice minister of the Ministry of Culture.

In the early part of the 21st century, Liu Qingtang returned to Beijing and opened a ballet school there. He died in 2010.
