= List of Chinese films of the 1970s =

This is a list of films produced in mainland China ordered by year of release in the 1970s. For an alphabetical listing of Chinese films see Category:Chinese films

== 1970 ==
Title	Chinese Title	Director	Actors	Genre	Notability
The Red Detachment of Women	红色娘子军	Pan Wenzhan, Fu Jie	Liu Qingtan, Xue Jinghua, Song Chen	Musical/Ballet	Produced by the Beijing Film Studio
Red Flag Canal	红旗渠	Hao Yusheng		Documentary	See Red Flag Canal
The Red Lantern	红灯记	Cheng Yin	Hao Liang, Gao Yuqian, Liu Changyu	Beijing Opera	Produced by August First Film Studio
Taking Tiger Mountain by Strategy	智取威虎山	Xie Tieli	Chen Jinbo, Tong Xiangling	Beijing Opera	A television production was also made the same year

== 1971 ==
Title	Chinese Title	Director	Actors	Genre	Notability
Shajiabang	沙家浜	Wu Zhaodi	Tan Yuanshou, Hong Xuefei, Wan Yiying	Musical	Produced by the Changchun Film Studio

== 1972 ==
Title	Chinese Title	Director	Actors	Genre	Notability
After School	放学以后	Yan Dingxian		Animation	
Ode to the Dragon River	龙江颂	Xie Tieli	Li Bingshu, Zhou Yunmin, Ma Míngqun, Sun Meihua	Beijing Opera	Film is set in 1963
On the Docks	海港	Xie Tieli, Xie Jin	Li Lifang, Zhao Wenkui, Zhu Wenhu, Guo Zhongqin, Zhou Zhuoran	Beijing Opera	Filmed version of On the Docks
Raid on the White Tiger Regiment	奇袭白虎团	Su Li, Wang Yan	Song Yuqing, Xie Tongxi, Xing Yumin	Beijing Opera	Film is set during the Korean War
The Red Detachment of Women	红色娘子军	Cheng Yin	Feng Zhixiao, Du Jinfang, Qu Suying	Beijing Opera	Produced by the August First Film Studio
White Haired Girl	白毛女	Sang Hu	Mao Huifang, Shi Zhongqin, Ling Guiming	Ballet	

== 1973 ==
Title	Chinese Title	Director	Actors	Genre	Notability
East China Sea Sentinel	东海小哨兵	Hu Xionghua		Animation	Produced by Shanghai Animation Film Studio
Little 8th Route Army	小八路	Lei You		Animation	Produced by Shanghai Animation Film Studio
Little Bugler	小号手	Wang Shuchen, Yan Dingxian		Animation	Produced by Shanghai Animation Film Studio
On the Docks	海港	Xie Tieli, Xie Jin	Li Lifang, Zhao Wenkui, Zhu Wenhu, Guo Zhongqin, Zhou Zhuoran	Beijing Opera	Second filmed version of On the Docks with same director and actors
Sunny Days	艳阳天	Lin Nong	Zhang Lianwen, Guo Zhenqing, Ma Jingwu	Drama	Alternate title: Bright Sunny Skies. From Hao Ran short story of the same name.
Tremendous Flood	战洪图	Su Li, Yuan Naichen	Lu Su, Cun Li, Cai Songling	Drama	

== 1974 ==
Title	Chinese Title	Director	Actors	Genre	Notability
The Fiery Years	火红的年代	Fu Chaowu, Sun Yongping, Yu Zhongying	Yu Yang, Zheng Danian, Wen Xiying	Drama	
Sparkling Red Star	闪闪的红星	Li Jun, Li Ang	Zhu Xinyun, Gao Baocheng, Liu Jiang, Liu Jizhong	Propaganda/Drama	
Start an Undertaking	创业	Yu Yanfu	Zhang Lianwen, Li Rentang, Chen Ying	Drama	Alternate title: The Pioneers

== 1975 ==
Title	Chinese Title	Director	Actors	Genre	Notability
A Yong	阿勇	Sun Jing, Yan Xueshu	Liang Baoqing, Zhang Shikun, Li Qing	Drama	
Before the Storm	雷雨之前	Li Wenhu	Wang Li, Wang Baokun, Li Shixi, Zhao Yijun, Shi Cunyu	Drama	Alternate title: Before the Thunderstorm
Breaking with Old Ideas	決裂	Li Wenhua	Guo Zhenqing, Wang Suya, Wenxi Ying, Ge Cunzhuang	Drama	
The Golden Road (Part One)	金光大道 (上集)	Lin Nong, Sun Yu	Zhang Guomin, Wang Fuli, Pu Ke	Drama	From Hao Ran short story of the same name
Spring Seedlings	春苗	Xie Jin, Liang Tinduo, Yan Bili	Li Xiuming, Gao Baocheng, Da Shichang	Drama	
Youth in Wartime	烽火少年	Dong Kena	Qiu Yingsan, Ma Jingwu, Wang Jingchun	Drama	

== 1976 ==
Title	Chinese Title	Director	Actors	Genre	Notability
Mountains in Impulse	沸腾的群山	Chen Fangqian, Gan Xuewei, Li Wei	Zhang Lianwen, Shi Baoguang, Xu Zhangyou	War	

== 1977 ==
Title	Chinese Title	Director	Actors	Genre	Notability
Ao Jinma	奥金玛	Liu Baode, Zhang Qicang	Zhaxilamu, Deqingzhuoma, Tie Duoji	Drama	
Defense in the Sky	蓝天防线	Wang Weiyi	Zhu Shimao, Xia Zongyou, Ning Xiaozhou, Lin Shujin	Action/Thriller	
Fire over the Yan River	延河战火	Lu Jianhua	Li Junhai, Lü Jieren, Han Tao	War	
Fishing Island in a Fury	渔岛怒潮	Zhang Jingren	Da Qi, Liu Jizhong, Li Hui	War	
Three Black Triangles	黑三角	Chen Fangqian, Liu Chunlin	Liu Jia, Ling Yuan, Lei Ming, Zhang Ping	Action/Spy	Literally Black Triangle
Trace of a Bear	熊迹	Zhao Xinshui	Shi Weijian, Li Moran, Deng Shutian, Gu Lan	Mystery	Alternate title: Bear Tracks
Youth	青春	Xie Jin	Joan Chen, Yu Ping, Wang Xiyan	Drama	

== 1978 ==
Title	Chinese Title	Director	Actors	Genre	Notability
The Blue Bay	蓝色的海湾	Ai Shui, Yan Xuezhe	Xin Jing, Cao Jingyang, Wang Yixiang	Drama	
Desert Camel	沙漠驼铃	Liu Qiong	Jiao Huang, Wang Hui, Liang Boluo, Chen Hongmei	Thriller	Literal title: Desert Camel Bell
Dinglong Town	丁龙镇	Wei Rong	Li Zhaoming, Guan Zhangzhu	Thriller	
Eventful Years	峥嵘岁月	Jing Mukui, Wang Feng	Zhang Hui, Gu Yongfei, Ling Yuan, Li Yan	Drama	
The Fight in Leopard Valley	豹子湾战斗	Jiang Shusheng, Wang Jiayi	Li Chengbin, Liu Guifen, Yang Xiuzhang	War	
A Liaison Woman	女交通员	Qin Fusheng	Lu Guilan, Yin Da, Zhang Na, Liu Hongkun	War	
The Man Who Lost His Memory	失去记忆的人	Huang Zuolin, Yan Bili	Wu Xiqian, Zhao Jiayan, Ma Guanying, Lin Lan	Drama	
A Rigorous Course	严峻的历程	Su Li, Zhang Jianyou	Guo Zhenqing, Tiancheng Ren, Sun Guolu	Drama	
The Shark Hunters	斗鲨	Tao Jin	Zhang Guomin, Zhang Liang, Shi Jin	Thriller	"Shark" refers to the code name of a KMT spy chief
Spark in a Mountain Village	山寨火种	Liu Zhongming	Zhao Yamin, Fang Huo, Li Wenwei	War	
Spring Comes Early on the Southern Border	南疆春早	Guo Jun, Xiao Lang	Zhang Liwei, Xu Xiaoyuan, Cui Hua, Wang Limin	Drama	
Uproot Eagle-Grave	平鹰坟	Fu Chaowu, Gao Zheng	Zhang Fa, Deng Xiaoling, Qiao Qi	Drama	

== 1979 ==
Title	Chinese Title	Director	Actors	Genre	Notability
After the Blue Flash	蓝光闪过之后	Fu Chaowu, Gao Zheng	Zhao Lian, He Shuohua	Drama	Film is set against the backdrop of the July 1976 Tangshan earthquake. "Blue" in the title refers to a blue dress. Winner of Best Art Design at the 1980 Hundred Flowers Awards.
Ah, Cradle	奥！摇篮	Xie Jin	Zhu Xijuan, Zhang Yongshou	Drama	
Aolei Yilan	奥雷·一兰	Tang Xiaodan	Zhang Yuhong, Zhong Xinghuo	Drama	Film is set in the time leading up to the 17th century Sino-Russian border conflicts.
Battle of Jinan City	济南战役	Zhu Wenshun	Guo Zhenqing, Yuan Yaodong	War	Film is about the Battle of Jinan.
Call of the Front	归心似箭	Li Jun	Siqin Gaowa, Zhao Erkang	War/Romance	Also known as Anxious to Return. Film is set in WWII.
Cherries	樱-サクラ	Han Xiaolei, Zhan Xiangchi	Cheng Xiaoying, Jiang Yunhui, Li Lin, Ouyang Yuqiu	Drama	
The Dawn	曙光	Tian Ran	Wang Tianpeng, Da Shichang	War	Film is set in early 1930 during the Chinese Civil War
Flying to the Future	飞向未来	Lu Xiaoya, Miao Ling	Qu Jia, Hu Rong	Family	
From Slave to General	从奴隶到将军	Wang Yan	Yang Zaibao, Wu Xiqian, Zhang Jinling	Drama	Literally From Slave to General
Hearts for the Motherland	海外赤子	Ou Fan, Xing Jitian	Joan Chen, Qin Yi	Drama	
Li Siguang	李四光	Ling Zifeng	Sun Daolin, Yu Ping, Wang tiecheng	Biographical	Based on Li Siguang
Little Flower	小花	Huang Jianzhong	Joan Chen, Liu Xiaoqing, Tang Guoqiang	Drama	Co-winner of Best Picture, winner of Best Actress (Joan Chen), Best Cinematography, and Best Music at the 1980 Hundred Flowers Awards.
Prince Nezha's Triumph Against Dragon King	哪吒闹海	Yan Ding Xian, Wang Shuchen		Animated/Family	Co-winner Best Art Picture at the 1980 Hundred Flowers Awards.
Reverberations of Life	生活的颤音	Wu Tianming, Teng Wenji	Shi Zhongqi, Leng Mei, Xiang Ying	Drama	Alternate title: The Thrill of Life
Troubled Laughter	苦恼人的笑	Deng Yimin, Yang Yanjin	Li Zhiyu, Pan Hong	Drama	Screened at the 1981 Cannes Film Festival
Young Swallow	乳燕飞	Sun Jing, Yao Shoukang	Chen Zurong, Cui Hua	Drama	
What a Family	瞧这一家子	Wang Haowei	Chen Peisi, Liu Xiaoqing	Drama	Winner Best Supporting Actor (Liu Xiaoqing) at the 1980 Hundred Flowers Awards.

== Mainland Chinese film production totals ==
Year	Total Films
1970	5
1971	2
1972	6
1973	5
1974	17
1975	25
1976	95
1977	22
1978	39
1979	59

== See also ==
- Cinema of China
- Best 100 Chinese Motion Pictures as chosen by the 24th Hong Kong Film Awards

== Sources ==
- 中国影片大典 Encyclopaedia of Chinese Films. 1949.10-1976, 故事片·戏曲片. (2001). Zhong guo ying pian da dian: 1949.10-1976. Beijing: 中国电影出版社 China Movie Publishing House. ISBN 7-106-01508-3
- 中国影片大典 Encyclopaedia of Chinese Films. 1977-1994, 故事片·戏曲片. (1995). Zhong guo ying pian da dian: 1977-1994. Beijing: 中国电影出版社 China Movie Publishing House. ISBN 7-106-01095-2
- 中国艺术影片编目 China Art Film Catalog (1949-1979). (1981) Zhongguo Yi Shu Ying Pian Bian Mu (1949-1979). Beijing: 文化艺术出版社 Culture and Arts Press.
