= Tiger Mountain =

Tiger Mountain may refer to:

== Places ==
- Tiger Mountain (Washington), United States
- Tiger Mountain, a summit of Rabun County, Georgia, U.S.
- Hushan Great Wall, or Tiger Mountain, Liaoning, China
- Tygerberg Nature Reserve, Bellville, Western Cape, South Africa
- Tuxedo Ridge Ski Center, on a ridge known locally as Tiger Mountain, New York, U.S.
- Tiger Mountain, Uşak, Turkey

== Fictional place ==
- Tiger Mountain, a fictional mountain in Qu Bo's novel Tracks in the Snowy Forest, adapted into
  - Taking Tiger Mountain by Strategy, Peking opera
  - Taking Tiger Mountain by Strategy (film), 1970
  - The Taking of Tiger Mountain, 2014 film

== Other uses ==
- Several trophies called Tiger Mountain of the Ham Polo Club, London
- "Tiger Mountain", a track on the 2009 album Life on Earth by Tiny Vipers

== See also ==
- Tiger (disambiguation)
- Tiger Hill (disambiguation)
- Taking Tiger Mountain by Strategy (disambiguation)
- Mount Longhu, Dragon Tiger Mountain, Jiangxi, China
