= Sonada =

- Census Town
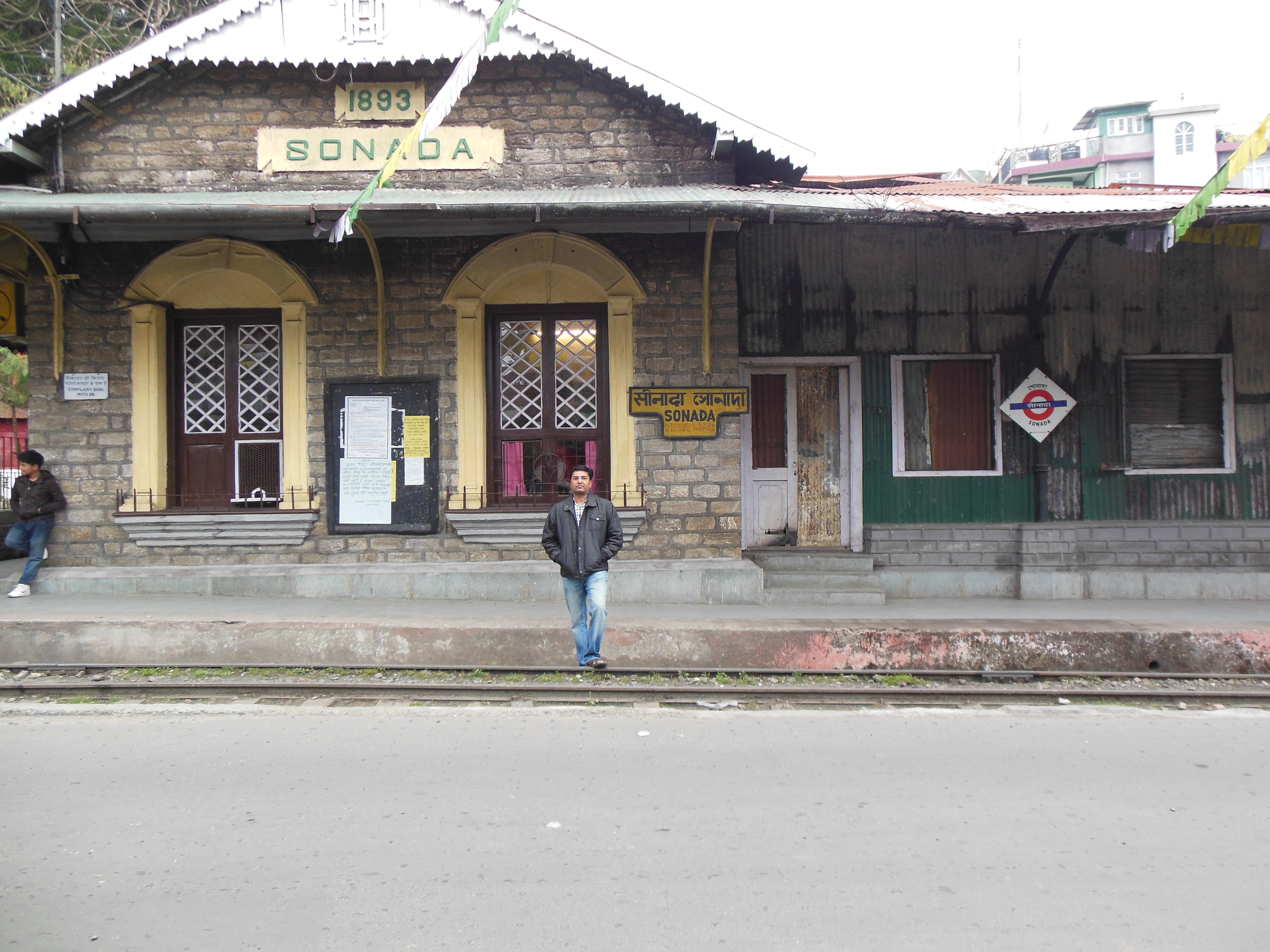
- Sonada railway station

- Location in West Bengal, India
- Coordinates: 26.961997°N 88.268367°E
- Country: India
- State: West Bengal
- District: Darjeeling

Population (2001)
  - Total: 11,635

Languages
  - Official: Hindi, Nepali, English
- Time zone: UTC+5:30 (IST)
- Lok Sabha constituency: Darjeeling
- Vidhan Sabha constituency: Kurseong

Sonada is a census town in the Jorebunglow Sukhiapokhri CD block in the Darjeeling Sadar subdivision of the Darjeeling District in West Bengal, India.

== Geography ==
Places and tea estates in the southern portion of Darjeeling Sadar subdivision (including Jorebunglow Sukhiapokhri CD block), and Mirik Subdivision in Darjeeling district
CT: census town, R: rural/ urban centre, NP: national park/ wildlife sanctuary, TE: tea estate
Abbreviations used in names – TG for Tea Garden (town/village), TE for Tea Estate
Owing to space constraints in the small map, the actual locations in a larger map may vary slightly

=== Area overview ===
The map alongside shows a part of the southern portion of the Darjeeling Himalayan hill region in the Darjeeling district. In the Darjeeling Sadar subdivision 61.00% of the total population lives in the rural areas and 39.00% of the population lives in the urban areas. In the Mirik subdivision 80.11% of the total population lives in the rural areas and 19.89% lives in the urban areas. There are 78 tea gardens/ estates (the figure varies slightly according to different sources), in the district, producing and largely exporting Darjeeling tea. It engages a large proportion of the population directly/ indirectly. Some tea gardens were identified in the 2011 census as census towns or villages. Such places are marked in the map as CT (census town) or R (rural/ urban centre). Specific tea estate pages are marked TE.

Note: The map alongside presents some of the notable locations in the subdivision. All places marked in the map are linked in the larger full screen map.

=== Location ===
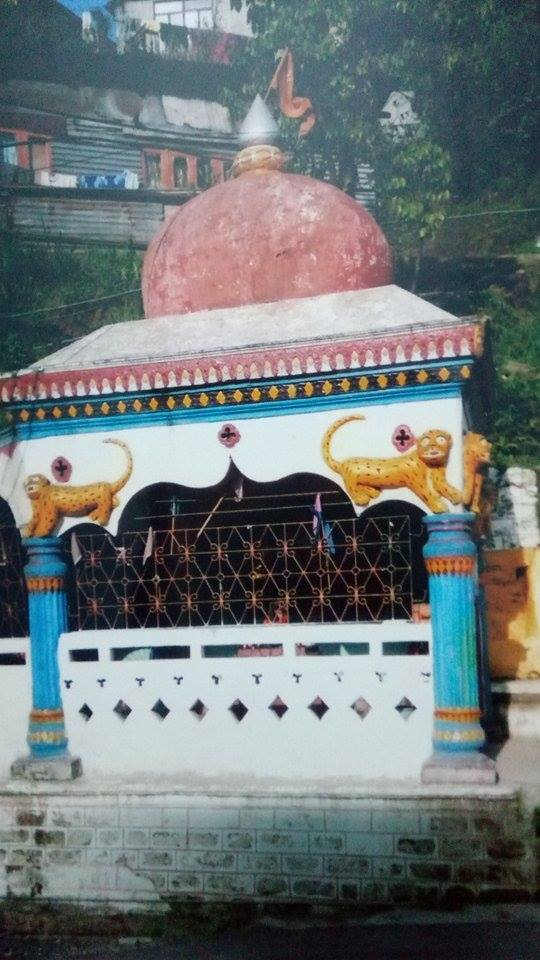
Hill Temple of Sonada, Darjeeling

Sonada is located at 26.961997°N 88.268367°E.

It is 17 km from Darjeeling town and 16 km from Kurseong. Mirik is 23 km away, Ghoom 8 km, Mangpu 8 km and Takdah 11 km. It lies on National Highway 55 connecting Darjeeling with Siliguri. Sonada Monastery, Tiger Hill, Chatakpur, Goreto Nalichour, Intek Ceder's and Senchal Lake are some places of interest near Sonada. The Darjeeling Himalayan Railway (Toy Train) passes through this town and there is a DHR railway station here.

There are several tea estates located in Sonada Valley: Oaks, Rungmook, Ceder's, Milling, Moondakotee, Ringtong, Balasun, Margaret's Hope, and Kalej Valley. Trout are found in the Balason River, a site used for fishing. Chatakpur Eco Village, located 6 km uphill from the town, attracts tourists as a vantage point for viewing the sunrise.

== Demographics ==
According to the 2011 Census of India, Sonada Khasmahal had a total population of 11.635 of which 5,793 (50%) were males and 5,842 (50%) were females. There were 861 persons in the age range of 0 to 6 years. The total number of literate people in Sonada Khasmahal was 9,482 (81.50% of the population over 6 years).

== Infrastructure ==
According to the District Census Handbook 2011, Darjiling, Sonada Khasmahal covered an area of 5.8073 km^{2}. Among the civic amenities, it had 3 km of roads, the protected water supply involved overhead tank, spring and tap water from untreated sources. It had 2,075 domestic electric connections. Among the medical facilities, it had 1 dispensary/ health centre, 1 veterinary hospital and 4 medicine shops. Among the educational facilities it had were 11 primary schools, 4 middle schools, 4 secondary schools, 2 senior secondary schools, 1 degree college. It had 5 shorthand, typewriting and vocational training institutes, 5 non-formal education centres (Sarva Siksha Abhiyan) and 1 special school for the disabled. Among the social, recreational and cultural facilities it had 1 orphanage home. It had the offices of 2 non-agricultural credit centres.

== Education ==
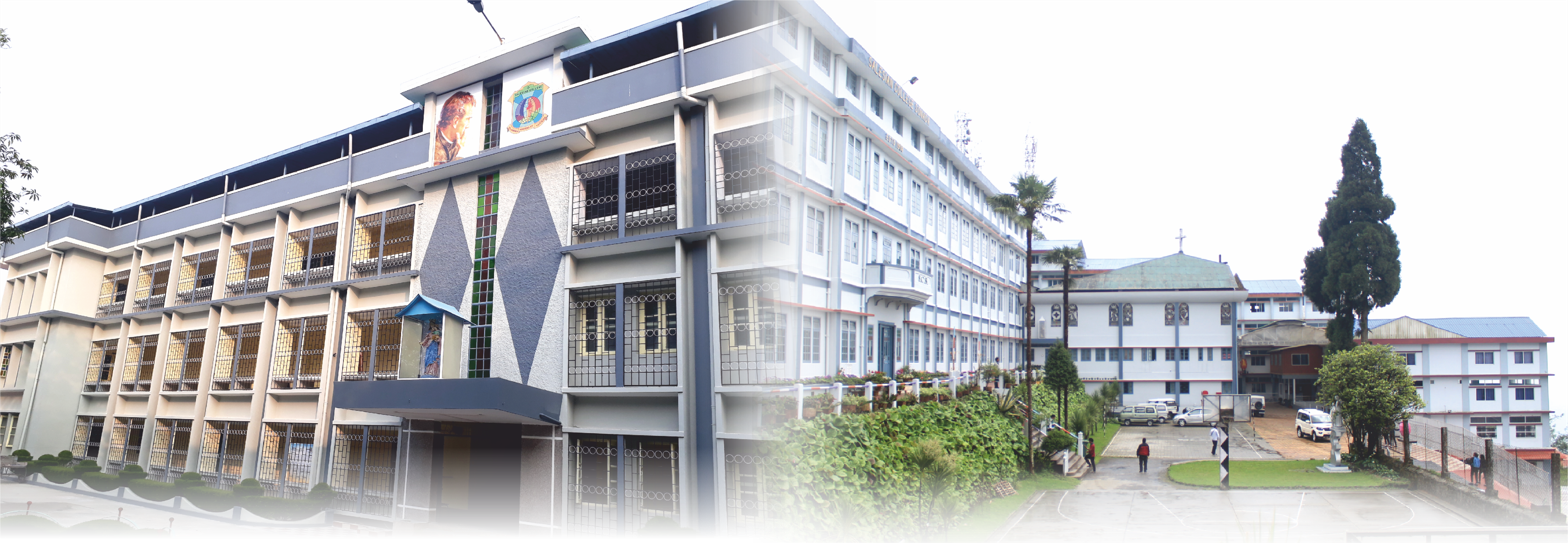
Salesian College

Salesian College was established at Sonada in 1933. Affiliated with the University of North Bengal it offers honours courses in English, education, history, geography, mass communication & journalism, political science, psychology, sociology, accountancy, finance, management, computer science and mathematics, and general courses in arts, science and commerce.

Sonada Degree College was established at Sonada in 1985. Affiliated with the University of North Bengal it offers honours courses in Nepali, English, history, political science and a general course in arts.
