= Tiger Hill =

Tiger Hill may refer to:

- Tiger Hill, Suzhou, People's Republic of China
- Tiger Hill, Suffolk, a wood in England
- Tiger Hill, Darjeeling, Uttarakhand, India
- Tiger Hill (Kargil), near the Kargil region of Ladakh, India
  - Battle of Tiger Hill, battle at the mountain during the 1999 Kargil War between India and Pakistan
- Tiger Hill (horse), Thoroughbred racehorse
- Tiger Hill (ship), a vessel involved in Aliyah Bet, an illegal immigration of Jews to Palestine in 1939

== See also ==
- Tiger Mountain (disambiguation)
