= Taking Tiger Mountain (disambiguation) =

Taking Tiger Mountain by Strategy is a Communist Chinese Revolutionary opera.

Taking Tiger Mountain or Taking Tiger Mountain by Strategy may also refer to:

== Films ==
- Taking Tiger Mountain by Strategy (film), a 1970 Chinese film based on the opera
- Taking Tiger Mountain (film), a 1983 American film starring Bill Paxton
- The Taking of Tiger Mountain, a 2014 Chinese film directed by Tsui Hark

== Other uses ==
- Taking Tiger Mountain (By Strategy), a 1974 solo album by musician Brian Eno
