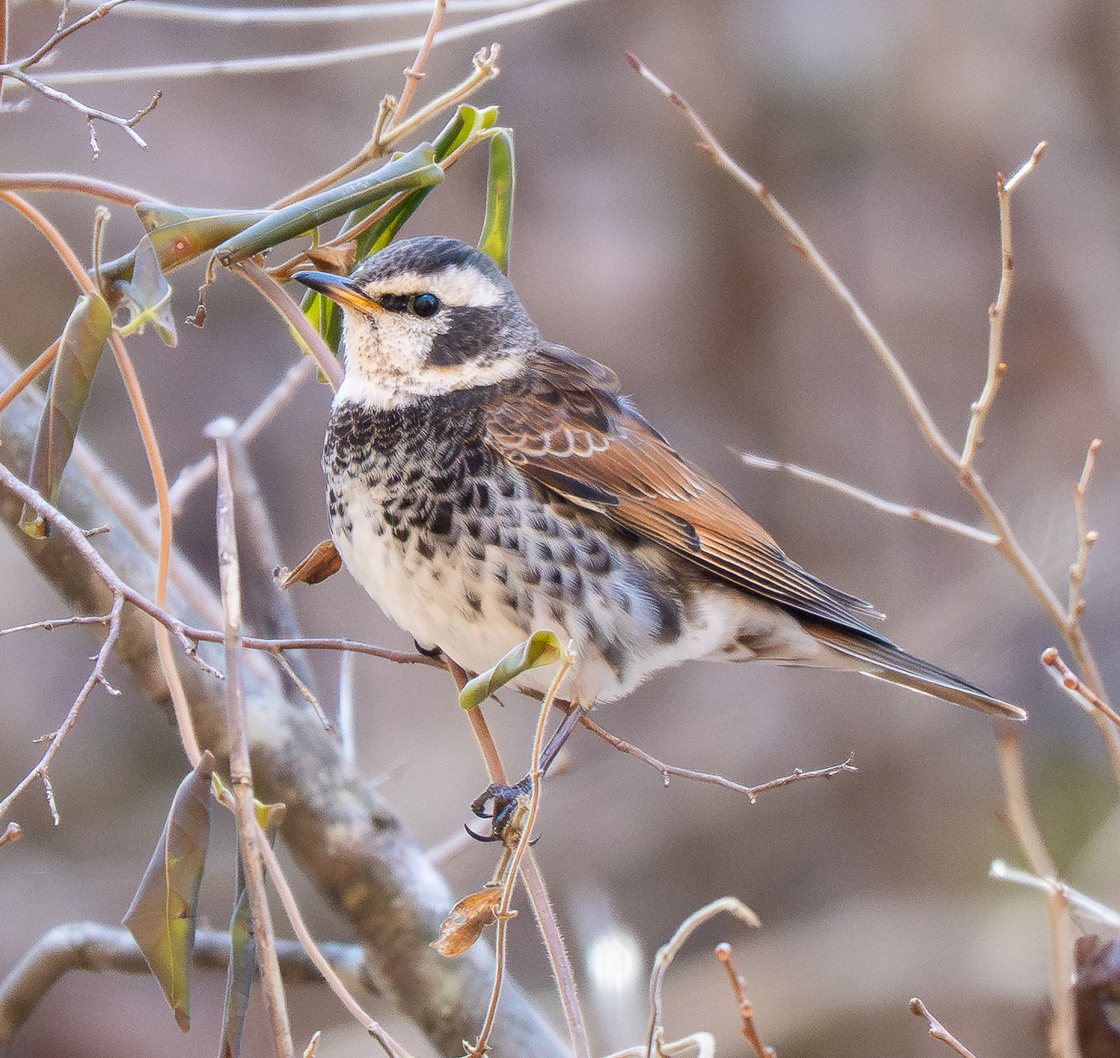
- In Japan

Conservation status
- Least Concern (IUCN 3.1)

Scientific classification
- Kingdom: Animalia
- Phylum: Chordata
- Class: Aves
- Order: Passeriformes
- Family: Turdidae
- Genus: Turdus
- Species: T. eunomus

Binomial name
- Turdus eunomus Temminck, 1831

= Dusky thrush =

Species of bird

The dusky thrush (Turdus eunomus) is a member of the thrush family which breeds eastwards from central Siberia to Kamchatka wintering in Korea, Japan, South China and Myanmar. It is closely related to the more southerly breeding Naumann's thrush T. naumanni; the two have often been regarded as conspecific. The scientific name comes from Latin Turdus, "thrush" and Ancient Greek eunomos, "orderly".

This species breeds in open woodland areas, but unlike Naumann's thrush, the dusky thrush is more tolerant of mountainous and tundra-edge habitats. This species is strongly migratory, wintering south to southeast Asia, principally in China and neighbouring countries. It is a rare vagrant to western Europe. In December 2016 a sighting of one in the Derbyshire in the United Kingdom brought hundreds of birdwatchers to see it.

It nests in trees, laying 3-5 eggs in an untidy but neatly lined nest. Migrating birds and wintering birds often form small flocks. It is omnivorous, eating a wide range of insects, especially mosquitoes, earthworms and berries.

This is a medium-sized but stocky thrush, reminiscent in structure of a small fieldfare. The underwing is reddish brown, and there is a pale supercilium.

Dusky thrush has a dark brown back and rump; the face, breast, and flank spots rump are black and the belly and undertail are white. Naumann's thrush in comparison has a paler brown back and head; the face, breast, flank spots and rump are reddish, and the belly and undertail are white.

The female is fairly similar to the male, but immatures have a weaker patterning.

The male dusky thrush has a simple fluted or whistling song, similar to the redwing. There are suggestions that the songs of dusky and Naumann's thrush differ.

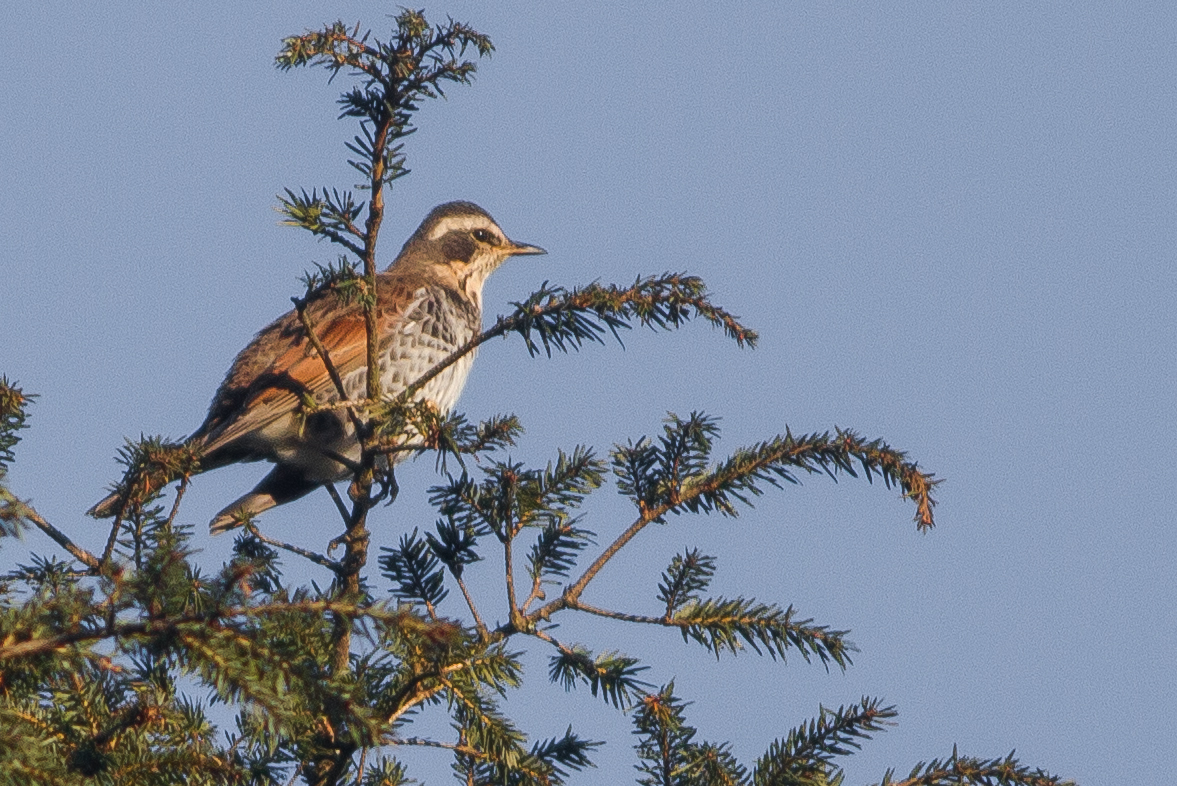
From Senchal Wildlife Sanctuary, Darjeeling, India

A dusky thrush in Japan
