= Xiao Wenyan =

Xiao Wenyan (1922–2013) was a Chinese Huai opera artist.

== Biography ==
=== Childhood ===
Born in 1922 in Jiangsu province, Xiao moved to Shanghai with her parents when she was 4 years old. She was nicknamed “Little Bundle of Joy” as a child. Soon after she came to Shanghai she was sold to the Zhang family. She went to study in the school for 2 and one-half years. The headmaster of the school gave her the official name of Zhang Shiqing, which means someone hardworking and very cultured. Joy was sold again when she was 10 years old because her adoptive parents both died from illness. This time Joy was sold to Liu family which owned a theater and rickshaw company in Shanghai. The Liu's believed that Joy was a jinx which brought bad luck to people. So Joy was given away to the Jing family who were one of the most powerful criminal families in Shanghai, and Joy had to serve Madame Jing. She was polite and hardworking, so finally Madame Jing wanted to keep her officially as a servant forever. This time the Liu's felt a bit of regret because it would mean they had to give away the hard-working girl. On the other hand, they also felt frightened that Joy would bring bad luck to Madame Jing, and it would bring them tremendous trouble. So they found an excuse to bring Joy back.

=== Stage career ===
At the Liu's theater Joy started to learn how to act. Everyday when she finished her chores in the theater, she went to the backstage to see how opera actors did rehearsal. Some actors knew of her miserable life so they felt sorry for her. They were kind enough to teach her a bit because of her respectful manners. Joy learned different kinds of local operas, martial arts and acrobatics. One of the masters performing at the theater Ming Le gave her the stage name 'Xiao Wenyan'.

In those years she became familiar with several genres of opera, and she was able to see Peking Opera, Kun Opera, Huai Opera, and Hui Opera. She took the opportunity of play operas along with famous Peking Opera artists such as Li Hui Fang at the theater Ming Le. In 1938 she started performing the work The Story of Two Butterflies at the theater. Her skills were increasing and she gained the confidence to develop her own style, which she named “free style melody ”. She was involved in reforming acting styles. This revolutionary style brought her success and promptly her fame spread throughout Shanghai and the neighboring provinces.

During 1946 she continued performing in several theaters and participated in the third edition of the Shanghai Theater Festival with the play The River of Reed Flowers. Here she obtained a very positive review from writers such as Tian Han and Hong Sheng. In October 1947 she acted voluntarily for an event organized by Song Qingling, the wife of Sun Yat-sen and later she performed at the theater Tianchan to celebrate the 82nd birthday of Sun Yat-sen.

In 1952 she was invited to participate in the National Competition for Study the Opera in Beijing. She performed in a special session for the Chairman Mao, President Liu Shaoqi and Prime Minister Zhou Enlai. In a national competition she won the First Prize and several other prizes. 1953 she joined an artist group and went to North Korea to greet and perform for the Chinese troops for 57 days.

She had the lead roles in two films, Rendezvous at Blue-Bridge (Lan Qiao hui) filmed in 1954, and (Nü Shen) Female Trial was filmed in 1960.

In 1964 she played a leading role in a Chinese modern Huai opera: One morning in the Docks. Afterwards it was adapted to a Peking model opera: On the Docks.

=== Later years ===
When in 1966 the Cultural Revolution began, she was accused of being anti-party, anti-socialism, etc. and was sent to work in a cowshed. When after three years was freed, she performed in a modern play, and again was accused of being a follower of the “black line”, so she was sent to a re-education camp.

In 1989 she was awarded the Gold Medal in the National Record given in Beijing. In 2006 she was invited to be celebrated and commemorated at the centenary of the Huai Opera in Shanghai.

She died after suffering a cerebral hemorrhage on September 19, 2013 in Shanghai.
