= Chatakpur =

Village in West Bengal, India

- Village
- Location in West Bengal, India
- Coordinates: 26.9671°N 88.3112°E
- Country: India
- State: West Bengal
- District: Darjeeling
- Elevation: 2,404 m (7,887 ft)
- Time zone: UTC+5:30 (IST)

Chatakpur is a village within the Senchal Wildlife Sanctuary, located in Darjeeling district, West Bengal, India. It sits at an elevation of 2,404 m (7,887 ft). One of the highest villages in the district, Chatakpur sits at a distance of about 25 km (15.5 mi) from Darjeeling and 7 km (4.3 mi) from Sonada, a census town in the Jorebunglow Sukhiapokhri CD block. Sparsely populated, Chatakpur is variously described as an eco-friendly village and an ecovillage, given the residents' reliance on the homestay industry and terrace farming. In 2017, India's first hill station cycle trail was opened in Darjeeling. The trail begins near Jorebungalow and concludes at Chatakpur. There is also a watchtower in the village.
