= Haigang =

Haigang (Chinese: 海港; lit. 'Seaport') may refer to:

- Haigang District, a district of Qinhuangdao, Hebei, China
  - Haigang Town, in Haigang District
- On the Docks, a Chinese revolutionary opera created during the Cultural Revolution

== See also ==
- Harbour City (Hong Kong), a shopping centre with this Chinese name in Tsim Sha Tsui, Kowloon, Hong Kong
- Harbour Centre Development, a Hong Kong company with this Chinese name
