= The Golden Road =

The Golden Road may refer to:

- The Golden Road, a pricing game on The Price Is Right
- The Golden Road, a 1954 Australian radio serial
- The Golden Road (1965–1973), a CD box set by the Grateful Dead named after a song, "The Golden Road (To Unlimited Devotion)"
- The Golden Road Music and Art Festival, an annual Grateful Dead festival in Louisville, KY.
- The Golden Road (Montgomery novel), a novel by Lucy Maud Montgomery
- The Golden Road, a 1972 novel by Hao Ran
- The Golden Road: How Ancient India Transformed the World, a 2024 book by William Dalrymple
- The Golden Road, an ancient track running along the ridge of the Preseli Hills in Pembrokeshire, Wales

== See also ==
- Golden road (disambiguation)
