= Salesian College, Darjeeling =

Salesian College (Autonomous)
- Salesian College Sonada & Siliguri
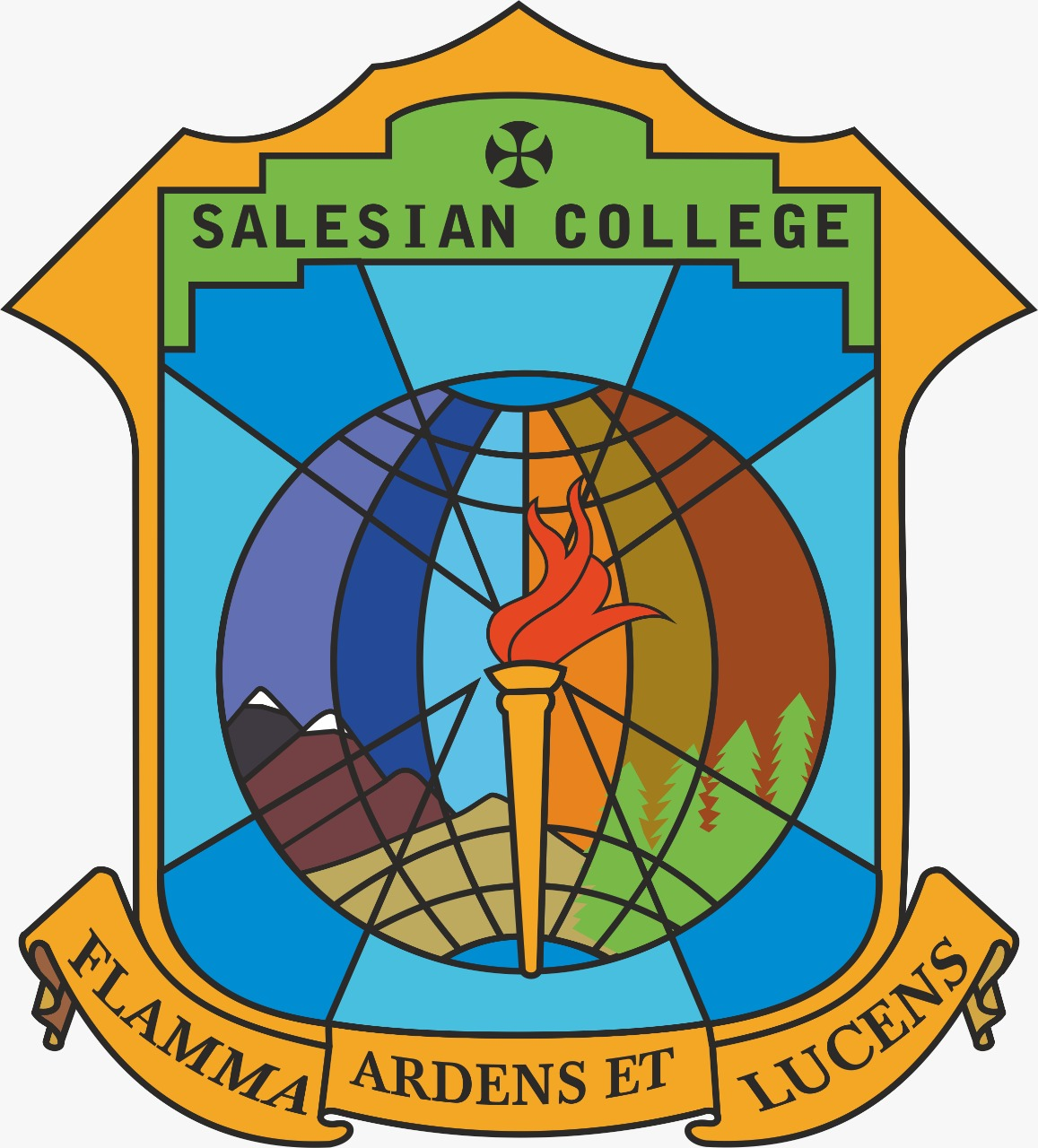
- Motto: Flamma ardens et lucens
- Motto in English: a flame that enlightens and enlivens
- Type: Private College offering Post Graduate and Under graduate programmes
- Established: 1933; 93 years ago
- Affiliations: University of North Bengal
- President: (Dr.) Nirmol Gomes
- Principal: Fr. (Prof.) George Thadathil
- Students: 1800+
- Location: Sonada and Siliguri, West Bengal, 734004, India; 26.7470377°N 88.4448553°E
- Campus: Urban
- Language: English
- Website: salesiancollege.ac.in
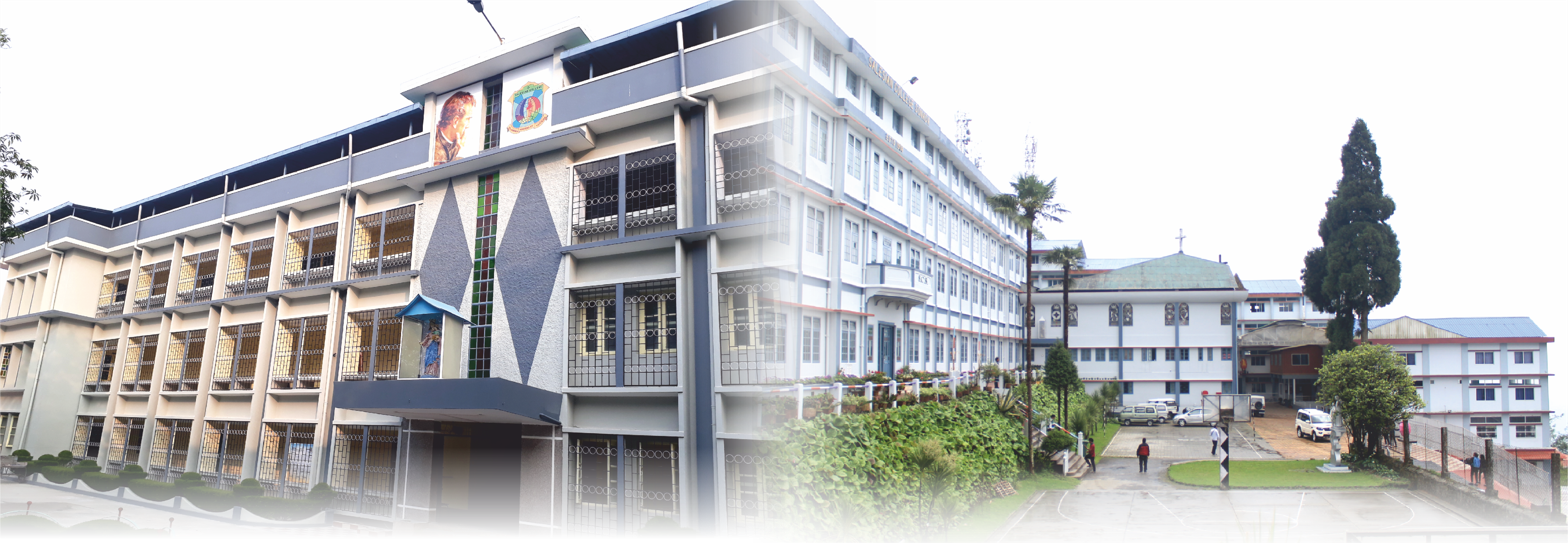

Salesian College (Autonomous), Sonada & Siliguri (SCS & SCSC) is a Government recognized, minority educational institution of the Catholic Church, run by Salesians of Don Bosco (SDB), Kolkata Province where over 1800 students do their Arts/Humanities, Commerce, Science and Professional Courses (Under Graduate & Post Graduate) under the North Bengal University (NBU).

SC was established in Shillong in 1933, before being shifted to Sonada, in 1938. It comes under section 2 (f) and 12 (B) of University Grants Commission (UGC) Act of 1956. In 1935, SC received affiliation to the Calcutta University for I.A., and in 1948 for BA Course in English, History and Latin followed by Economics in 1950. In 1962 its affiliation was transferred from Calcutta University as one of the founding colleges of NBU. It was in 1970 and 1979 that SC received affiliation for BA Honours Course in English and History respectively followed by the introduction of Education and Philosophy as B.A subjects. In 2006 it received affiliation for Education Honours course. The College opened a Computer Skills Department in 2002, offering the DIT and ADIT courses of C-DAC, Pune, and the Computer Application Certificate Course of NBU in 2004.

SCSC, Siliguri Campus was inaugurated on 9 July 2009. The Siliguri Campus offers BA /B.Com / B.Sc / BBA / BCA / BSW Honours & General courses with Career Oriented Programme (COP) courses in Travel & Tourism Management, Computer Application, Music, Sports Management and Communicative English. SC is also recognized as an IGNOU Study Centre (from May 2005 in SCS and 2010 in SCSC) offering courses in BA, B.Com., CIC, CLP, M A, M.Com., BSW & BCA. SC was accredited by NAAC on 16 September 2004, with an Institutional score between 60-70%, receiving the Grade C++.

On 26 February 2010, Salesian College was conferred the status of a ‘College with Potential for Excellence’ (CPE) by the University Grants Commission and now is in its Second cycle from 1 April 2014. In March 2012, in its Second Cycle, the College was re-accredited by NAAC with ‘A’ grade. The college has retained its ‘A’ Grade in the Third Cycle starting from May 2019, the first College to receive such grade under the University of North Bengal. The college has started MA in English from 2016–17 and MA in Education and Psychology from 2019. From the academic session 2019-2020 Salesian College Siliguri campus has initiated Bachelor of Social Work (BSW) and Bachelor Vocational Studies in Retail and Tourism Management.

Salesian Publications, Salesian Research Centre and Salesian Translation Centre offer opportunities for capacity building for aspiring teaching and research personnel of the region. Salesian College Extension Activities Centre has trained and placed over 600 youth of the region in collaboration with Ministry of Rural Development and Don Bosco Tech, New Delhi. The College also caters to 28 villages of surrounding region as part of its extension activity. Salesian College invites young people and their parents to partner in nurturing an ideal society.

Salesian College Sonada (SCS) is also the first college under University of North Bengal and entire northeast India to operate a Community Radio. Other neighbouring Community Radio stations are run by universities in Kolkata (Jadavpur University) and Guwahati (KK Handique Open University and Gauhati University). The SCS web radio was launched on 28 October 2016 as a Diwali gift to Nepali people all over the world. With due permission for Wireless Operation, the official broadcast of Radio SALESIAN 90.8 FM was held on 8 December 2016.Radio SALESIAN 90.8 FM broadcast can be heard live in parts of Darjeeling and Siliguri as well as Kurseong, Mirik, Salugara, Sonada, Sukna, Pashupati (Nepal), Sukiapukuri, Balsun Valley and several other places.

== Programmes Offered ==
	Under Graduate Programmes (UG)	Post Graduate Programmes (PG)
Arts and Humanities	English, Geography, Economics, History, Philosophy, Education Mass Communication and Journalism, Political Science, Psychology, Sociology, Social Work (BSW) and BA programme with Physical Education	English , Education, Psychology
Sciences	Economics, Physics, Mathematics, Statistics(GE), Computer Science and Bachelors of Computer Applications (BCA)	
Commerce & Management Studies	Commerce - B Com Honours, B Com Programme, Bachelors of Business Administration (BBA) and Bachelors of Vocation (BVoc) in Tourism and Retail Management.	
Career Oriented Programmes	Certificate, Diploma & Adv. Diploma in Travel & Tourism, Computer Applications, Communicative English, Sports Management & Music.	

== Publications ==
1. JOURNALS -
  - Salesian bi-annual Journal of Humanities and Social Sciences (ISSN 0976-1861)
2. BOOKS -
  - Salesian College – A History that Speaks Today
  - Triumph of Failure: John Henry Newman
  - Krist
  - The Teesta on the Run
  - Brahmarshi Sree Narayan Guru
  - The Clash
  - Being a Priest in India: A Manifesto
  - Don Bosco The Translator and many more.
3. MAGAZINES -
  - Sparkle
  - SCSpeaks
  - ESSENCE
  - ELEMENTS
4. NEWSLETTERS -
  - The Salesian Times
  - Evolve
  - Alumnews

== Gallery ==
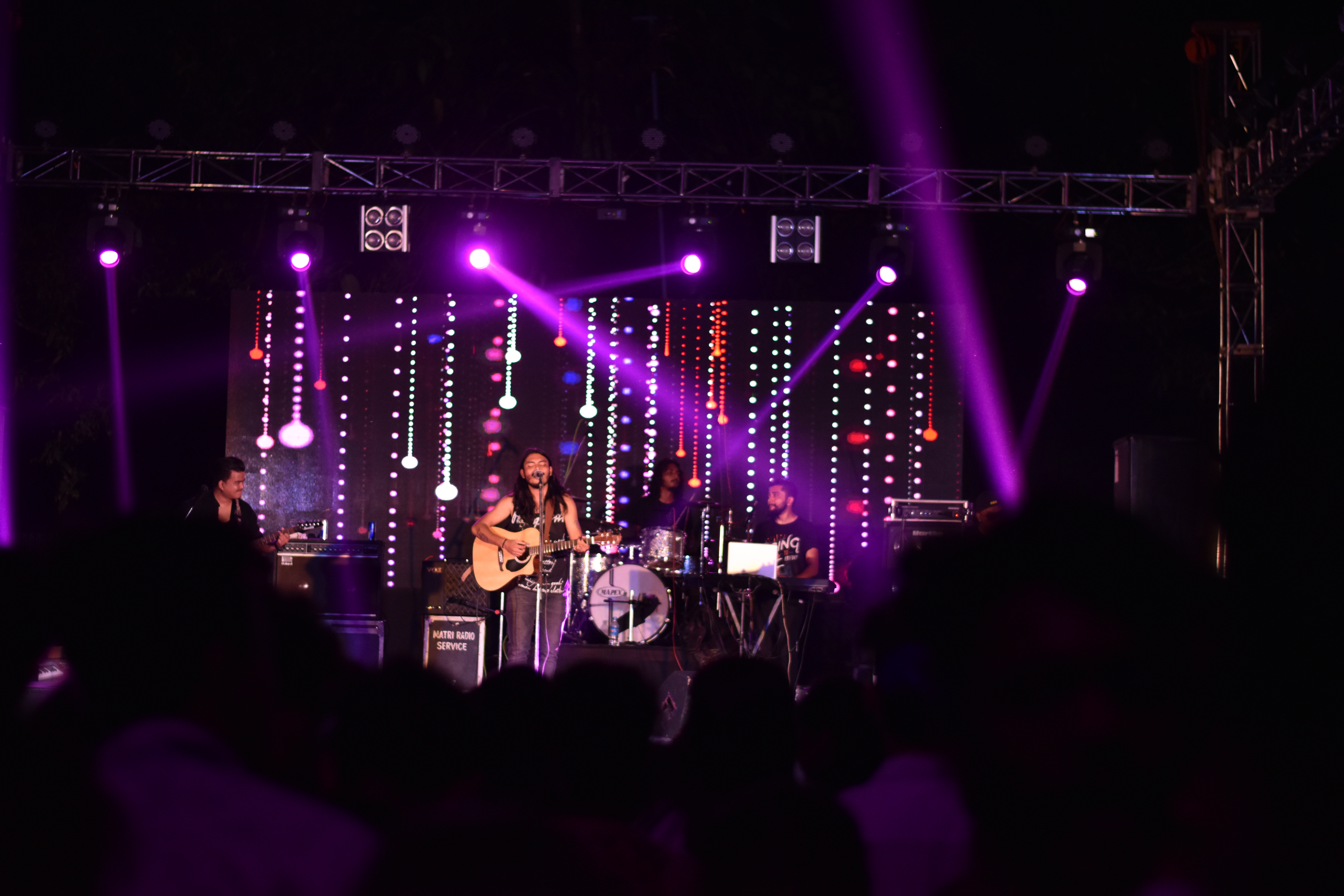

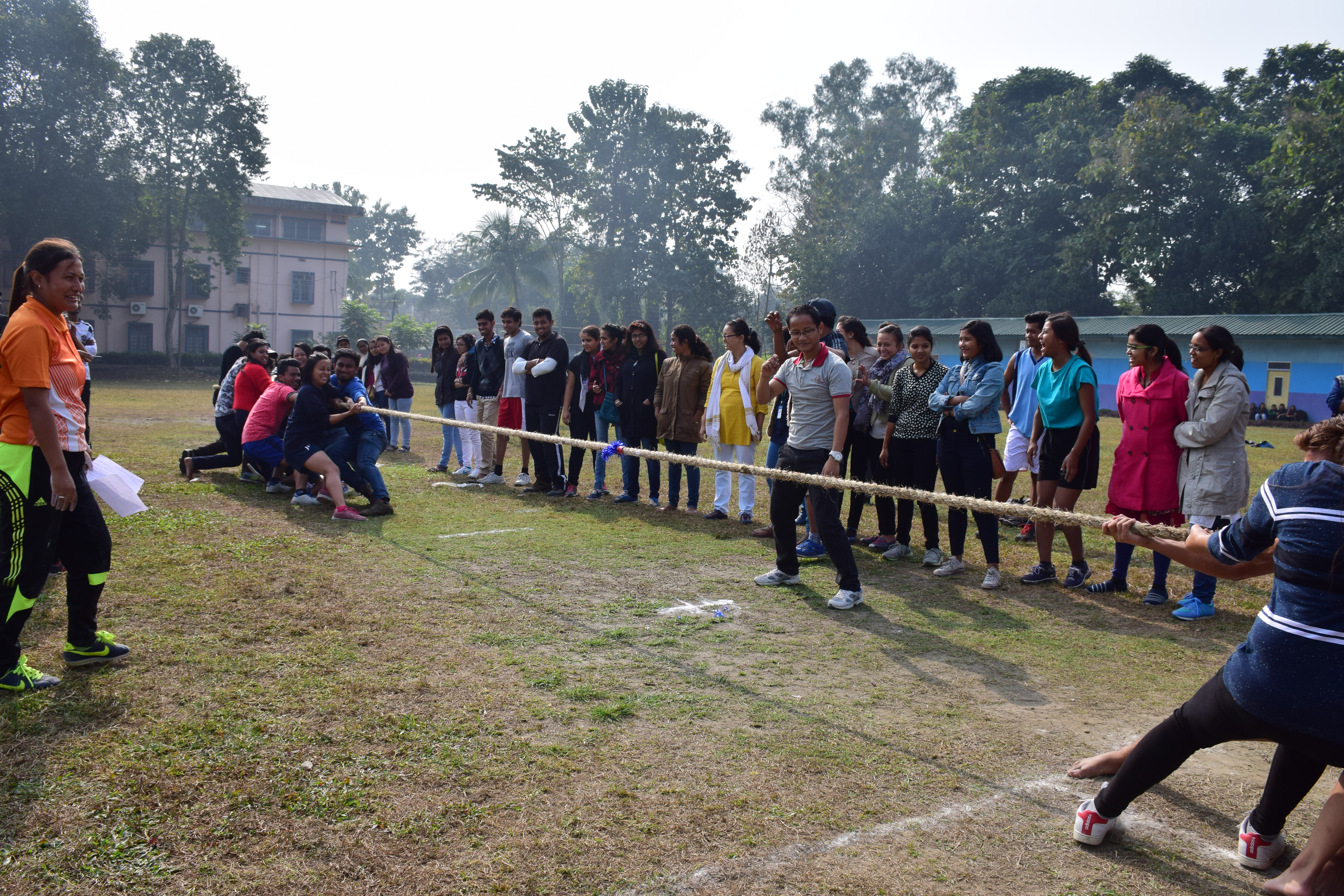

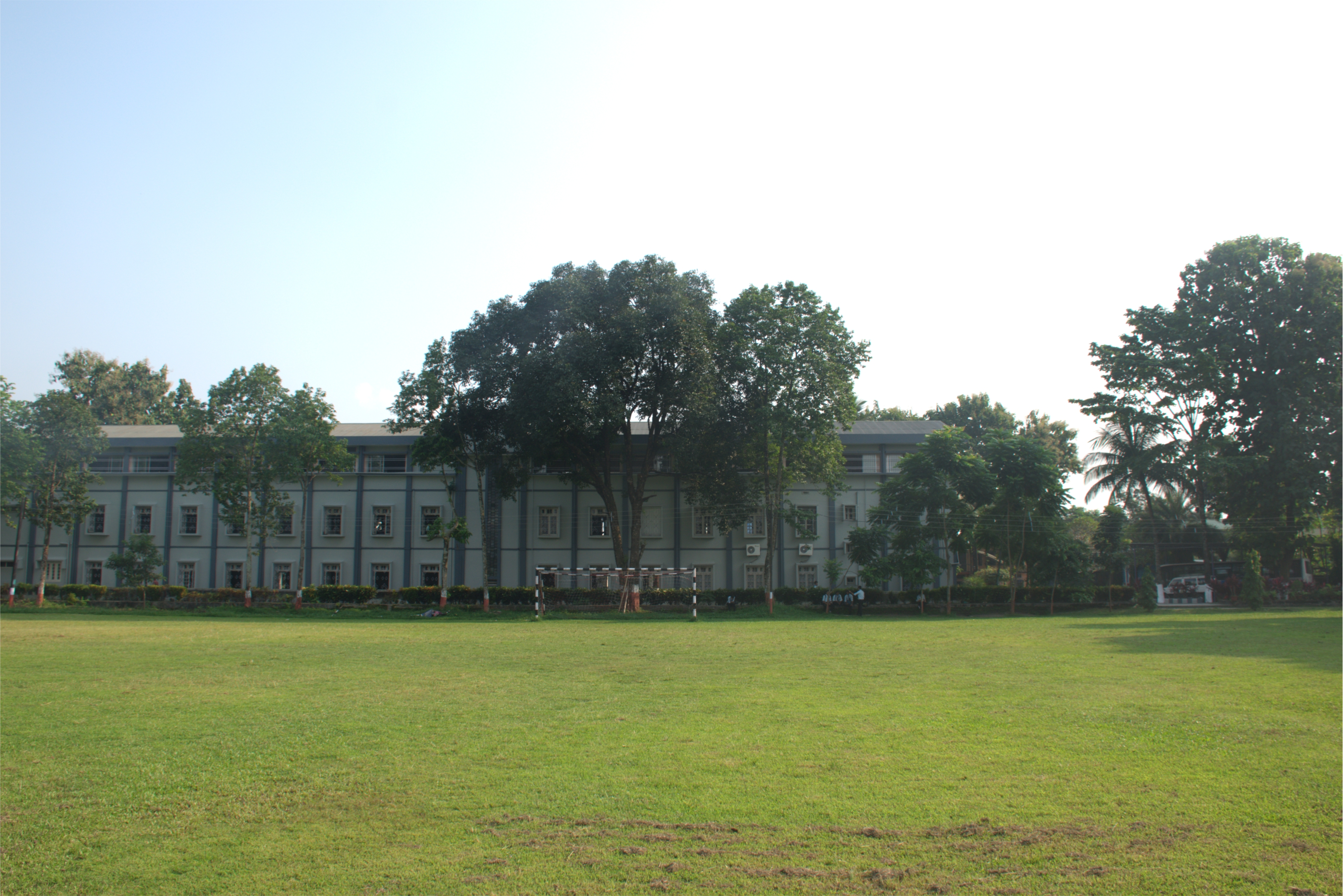

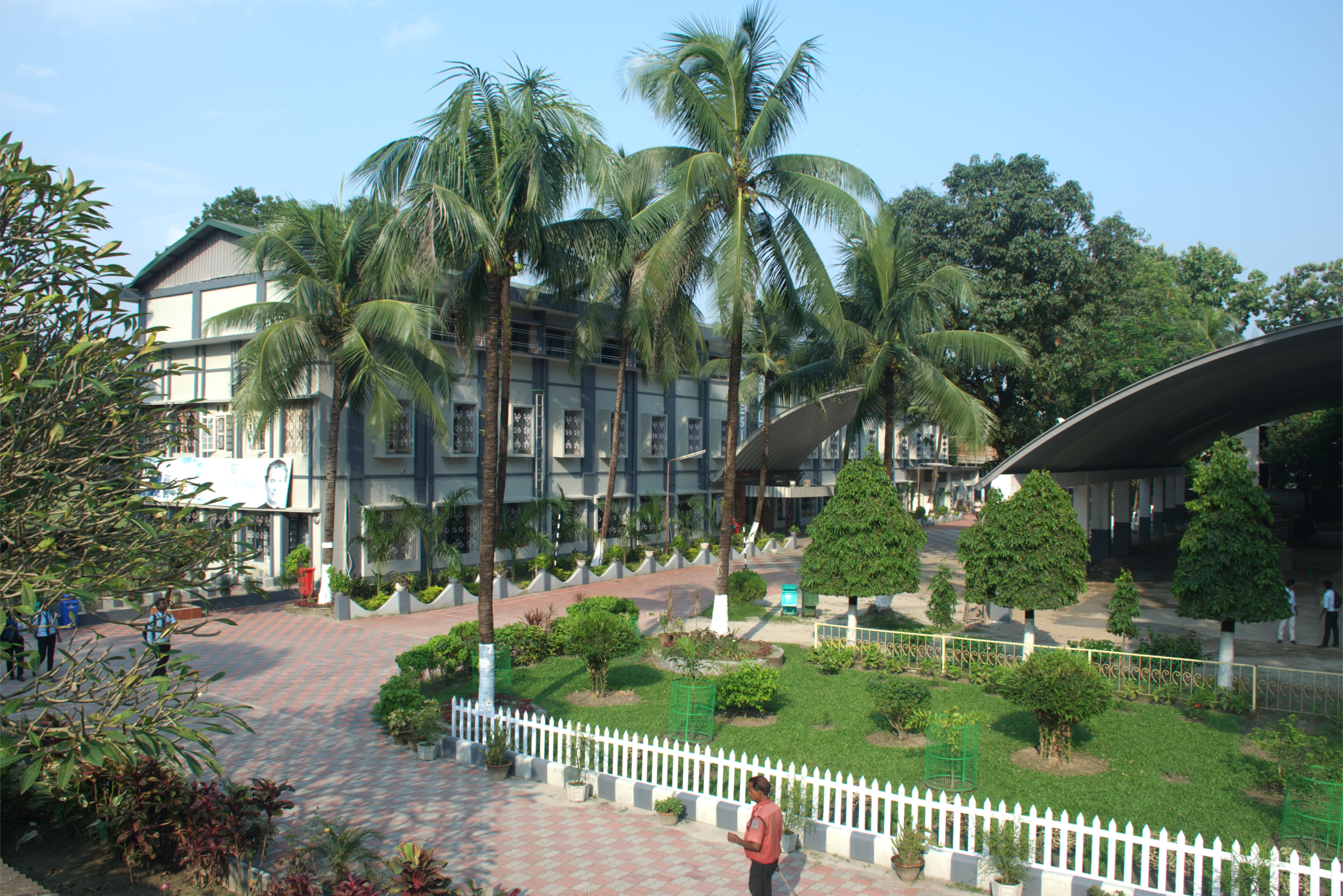

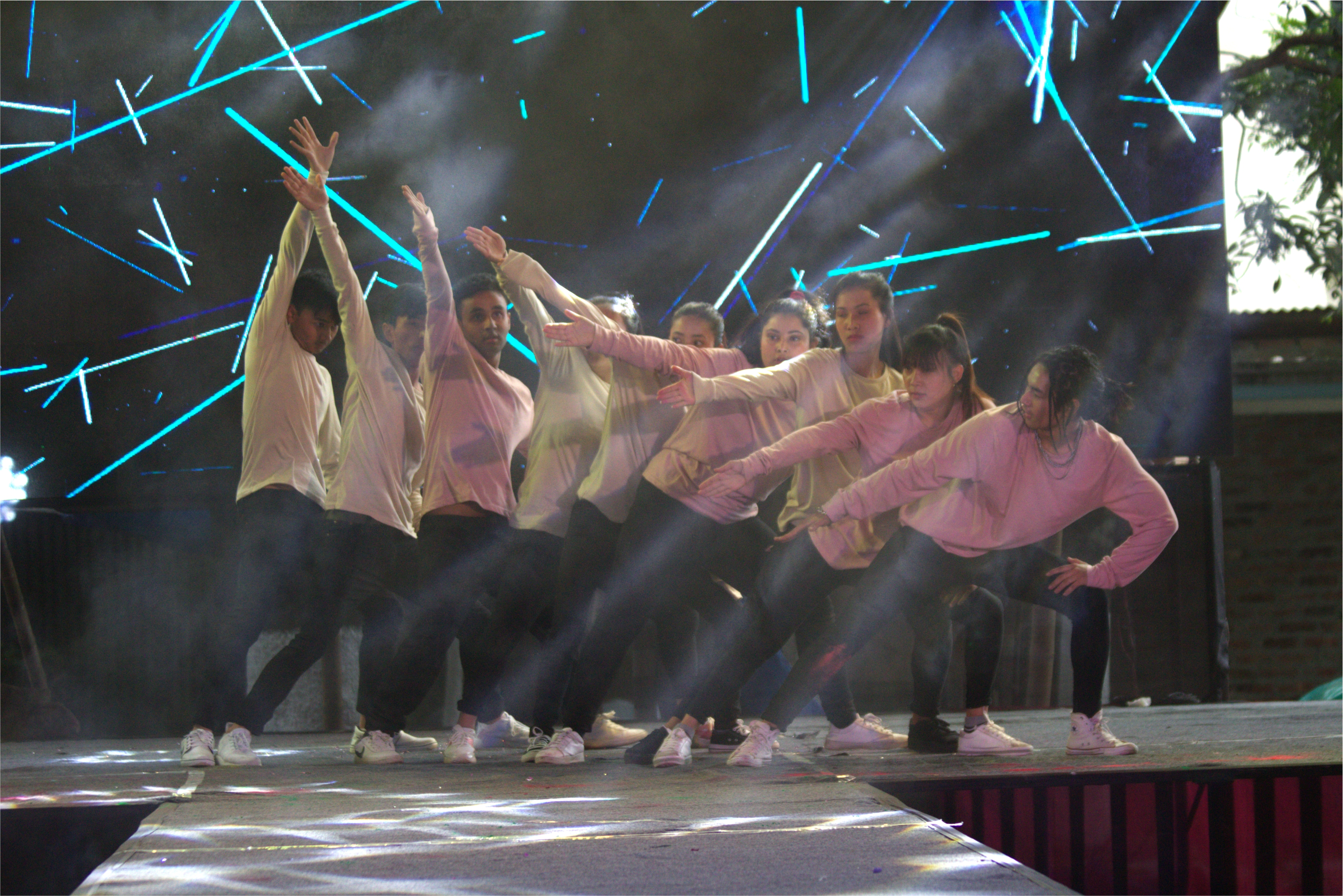

== Accreditation ==
The college is recognised by the National Assessment and Accreditation Council (NAAC) & University Grants Commission (UGC).

== See also ==
- List of institutions of higher education in West Bengal
- Education in India
- Education in West Bengal
