= Zhang Lianwen =

Chinese actor (1945–2019)

Zhang Lianwen (Chinese: 张连文; February 1945 – 4 January 2019) was a Chinese actor, known for his starring roles in Sunny Days, The Pioneers, and Eighteen Years in Enemy Camp. He was named a distinguished artist by the State Council of China.

== Biography ==
Zhang was born in February 1945 in Changchun, Jilin, China. He entered Beijing Art College in 1960 and studied acting.

In 1973, he made his acting debut in the film Sunny Days directed by Lin Nong, playing the role of Xiao Changchun. His performance impressed the renowned director Xie Tieli, who recommended him to audit for the film The Pioneers (创业, 1974). He was selected to play the lead role Zhou Tingshan, based on the model petroleum worker, "Iron Man" Wang Jinxi. This was his most famous role, making him an "idol" of the era. To shoot a scene in which Zhou jumps into the mud, Zhang was soaked in mud for three days, and contracted a severe skin disease.

Zhang later starred in the films Wedding, Xu Mao and His Daughters, and the TV series Eighteen Years in Enemy Camp. He was named a distinguished artist by the State Council of China and awarded a special pension.

In late 2014, Zhang was severely injured in a car accident and was hospitalized for a month. His health steadily deteriorated and he died on 4 January 2019, at the age of 73.
