= Huai opera =

Regional form of Chinese opera

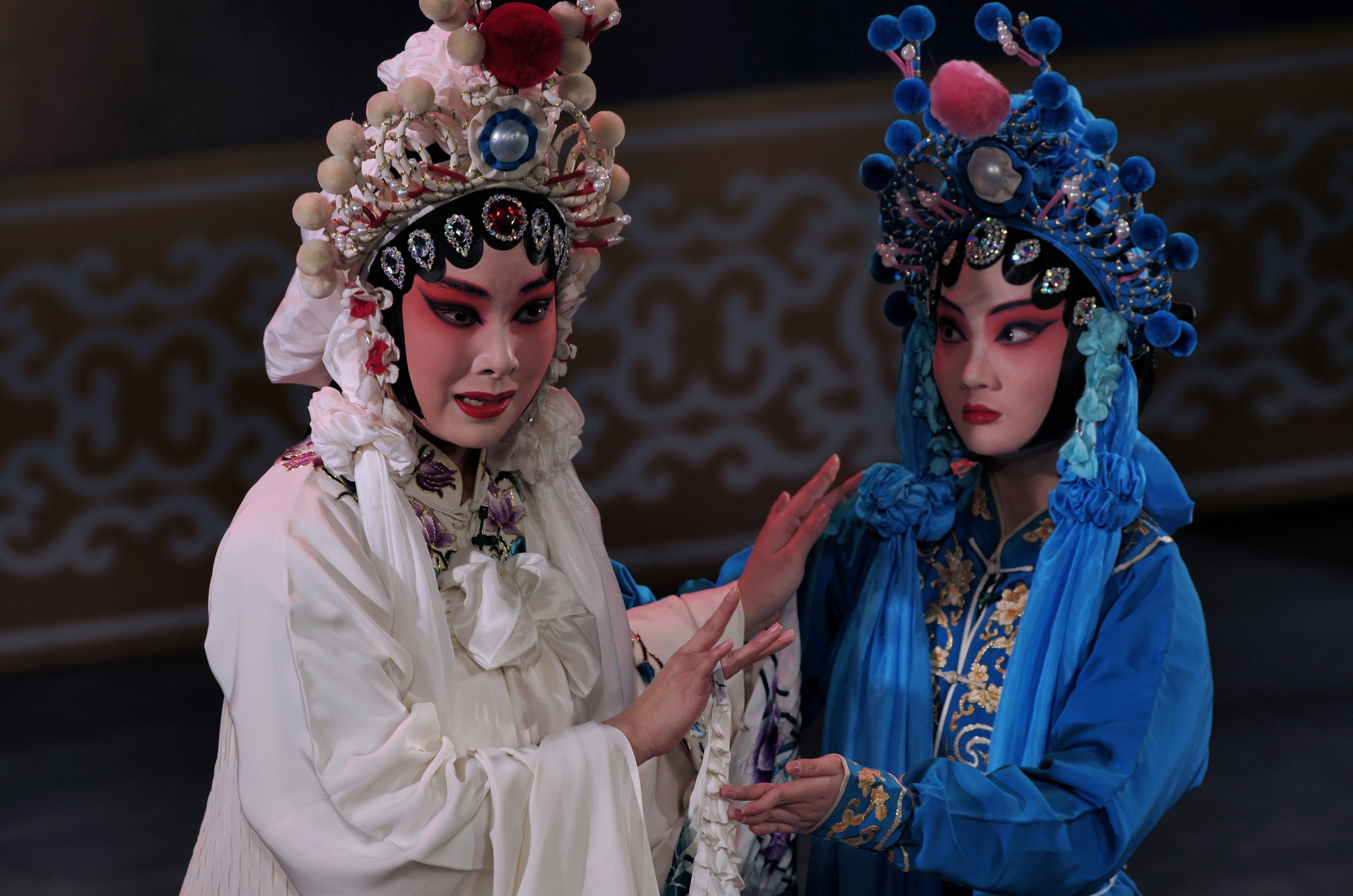
Shanghai-based Huai opera actresses performing Legend of the White Snake in 2015.

Huai opera (Chinese: 淮剧; pinyin: Huáijù), also known as Jianghuai opera (Chinese: 江淮戏; pinyin: Jiānghuáixì), is a regional form of Chinese opera that originated in the 19th century in Yancheng, Jianhu County, and Huai'an in northeastern Jiangsu Province. In 2008 it was listed as a national-level intangible cultural heritage. It is most often performed in Shanghai and Jiangsu. There are three major variants with respect to mode and dialect, one from eastern Jiangsu, one from western Jiangsu, and the one in Shanghai which incorporated new tunes.

== Famous performers ==
- Xiao Wenyan
