= Legend of Sealed Book =

The Legend of Sealed Book
- Directed by: Wang Shuchen; Qian Yunda
- Written by: Bao Lei; Gu Hanchang; Wang Shuchen
- Produced by: Xiong Nanqing
- Cinematography: Jin Zhicheng; Wang Shirong
- Edited by: Li Kaiji
- Music by: Wu Yingju
- Production company: Shanghai Animation Film Studio
- Release date: 1 January 1983
- Running time: 89 minutes
- Country: China
- Language: Mandarin

The Legend of Sealed Book (Chinese: 天书奇谭; pinyin: Tian Shu Qi Tan) is a Chinese animated feature film produced by Shanghai Animation Film Studio. It is also referred to as Book Which Came from the Sky, Tales about the Heavenly Book and Secrets of the Heavenly Book.

== Background ==
The film was produced with rigorous dubbing, fluid combination of music and vivid animations. The story is based on the classic literary work Ping Yao Zhuan (平妖傳, "The Suppression of the Demons") authored by Feng Menglong. It was first conceived by the BBC and offered to the Shanghai Animation Film Studio, however, the Chinese team was not satisfied with the script and extensively rewrote it. By a certain point, the BBC had already left the project due to financial concerns.

== Story ==
Grandpa Yuan(Yuangong)'s duty is to guard the heavenly book, which he has done for three thousand years. One day he opens the shrine and exposes the holy book to the human world. He also carves the contents of the book on the stone wall of the Cloudy Cave in the mountains. He is then punished by the Jade Emperor to guard the book for life and the cave for breaking heaven's law and betraying the holy secret to humankind.

One day three huli jing spirits climb up to the cave and transform into humans. They steal a stone egg from the shrine and leave the cave once they realize Grandpa Yuan is returning. However they begin to fight over the egg and lose it, until it turns out in a monk's well. The monks are bewildered by this egg, which glows and cries like a human baby. However, the fox spirits bury it and place a boulder on its hiding place.

An old lady later on knocks away the boulder, which lets the stone egg emerge. A human baby hatches from the egg. After the old woman feeds the baby, he suddenly grows to the size of a child and speaks, and then leaves. The child tries to reach Cloudy Cave, however Yuangong, who names him Dansheng, or "Eggborn", explains that Dansheng can only reach Cloudy Cave when Yuangong goes to report to Heaven. Yuangong commands Dansheng to write down everything that is on the walls of the cave and to leave immediately when Yuangong comes back. This task is accomplished. Yuangong commands Dansheng to learn all the spells written down in his copy of the book, and once he has control over his powers to condemn evil and uphold virtue, to do good things for people, and to never let bad people have the holy book.

Dansheng first begins to practice flight, however he falls into a land afflicted by drought and locusts. The huli jing spirits are there as well, swindling people out of their goods in order to "drive away" the locusts. Dansheng reveals to the people that they were fooled and summons a flock of birds to eat the locusts, and rainclouds to alleviate the drought. The huli jing spirits see the holy book and steal it, using the magic within to continue to make life difficult for the people. The climax is at the Imperial Palace, where the huli jing spirits and Dansheng fight each other using their magic and wits and try to claim ownership of the book, until Yuangong appears and destroys the Cloudy Dream Mountain, crushing the fox spirits underneath it. He then burns the holy book but not before he had Dansheng memorizes the book's contents by heart, ensuring Heaven's magic will always aid Mankind in times of great need. Yuangong is then arrested and brought back to Heaven to face punishment for his negligence, with a grieving Dansheng left behind, begging him not to go.

== DVD & Blu-ray ==
The movie was republished on two disc DVDs. The first disk contains the movie, the second contain other work from the director Wang Shuchen.

In March 2025, Diskino published the 4K remastered version of the movie on a single UHD Blu-ray disc, including extra behind the scenes of remastering, trailer and Channel 4 documentary Frame by Frame: The Shanghai Animation Studio.

== See also ==
- List of animated feature-length films
