= Golden road =

Golden road may refer to:

- Golden Road (album), by Keith Urban
- Golden Road, a part of the Topkapı Palace
- Golden Road (黄金道路, Ōgon-dōro), from Erimo to Hiroo, in Japan
- Golden Ring Road, Maryland Route 588
- Golden road, a fictional element in The Wizard of Mars
- Golden Road, a pricing game on The Price Is Right
- Golden Road (Maine), a 97-mile long private road into the Maine north woods
- A fantasy novel trilogy by Larry Niven and Jerry Pournelle; part of the world of the novel The Magic Goes Away
- Golden Road Brewing, a brand of Anheuser-Busch InBev

== See also ==
- The Golden Road (disambiguation)
- Gold Road
