= Senchal Lake =

- Location within West Bengal
- Location: Darjeeling
- Coordinates: 26.9938°N 88.2652°E
- Type: Reservoir
- Basin countries: India
- Surface elevation: 8,160 ft (2,490 m)

Senchal lake, located 10 km to the south-east of Darjeeling, is the main reservoir of potable water for the town of Darjeeling, India. The water body is actually a twin lake: North Senchal lake, built in 1910 and South Senchal lake, built in 1932. The lake is located at an altitude of 8,160 ft (2,487 m) atop a hill. The hill also has one of the highest golf courses in the world. Senchal is a favourite picnic spot. A tourist lodge at Senchal provides accommodation to tourists. This lake is a part of the Senchal Wildlife Sanctuary.

== See also ==
- Senchal Lake on Wikimapia
