= Wang Shuchen =

Wang Shuchen (Chinese: 王树忱; pinyin: Wáng Shùchén, 1931–1991) was a Chinese film director and screenwriter, best known for directing the films Nezha Conquers the Dragon King and Legend of Sealed Book.

== Biography ==
Much of what is known about Wang Shuchen's personal life comes from the writings of his son, Wang Yiqian.

Wang Shuchen was born in Dandong, Liaoning Province, in 1931. He was of Hui nationality. He had two elder brothers, both who were taken by the Japanese occupiers of Manchuria, and never seen again. In 1948, Wang began to study at Northeastern University and at the Lu Xun Academy of Fine Arts. In 1950 he moved to Shanghai to begin work at the Shanghai Animation Film Studio. It is known that Wang Shuchen was greatly respected by his peers: the animator Dai Tielang said that Wang had "an imposing spirit and force". He died of cancer in 1991.

In 1959, Wang had already been working on Nezha Conquers the Dragon King, intending it to be a collaboration with Soviet animators. The project fell through, and Nezha was shelved until 1978, when Yan Dingxian and A Da joined the directorial team.

Nezha, of which Wang was both director and screenwriter, was a great success. It was screened out of competition in Cannes.

== Selected filmography ==
- Crossing the Monkey Mountain (1957)
- The Little Trumpeter (1973)
- Nezha Conquers the Dragon King (1979) (co-director)
- Legend of Sealed Book (1983) (co-director and screenwriter)
- Feeling from Mountain and Water (1988) (screenwriter)
