= Tiger Hill, Darjeeling =

Mountain in India with views of the Himalayas

Tiger Hill
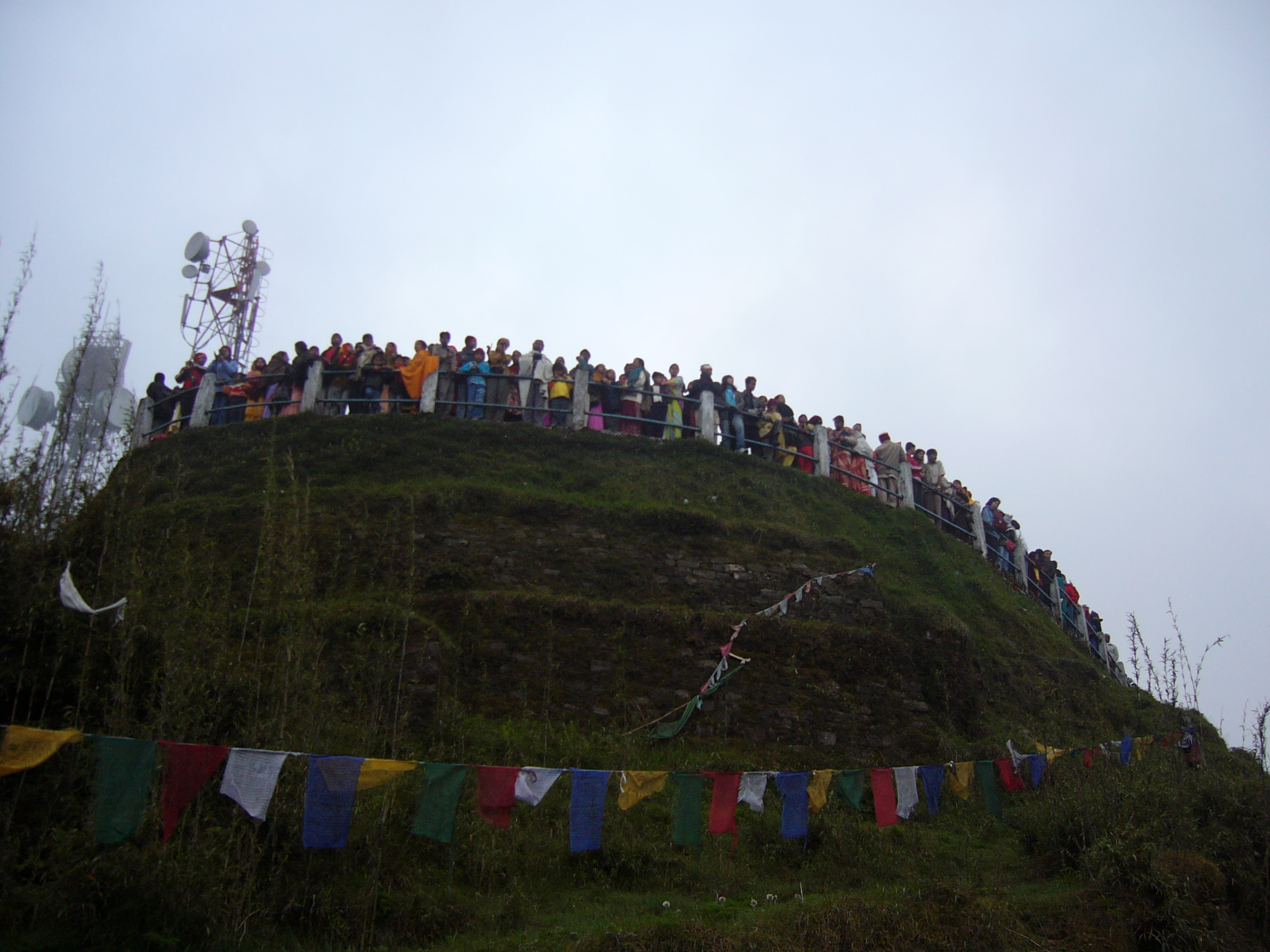
- View of the summit of Tiger Hill.

Highest point
- Elevation: 2,590 m (8,500 ft)
- Coordinates: 26.99484°N 88.28542°E

Geography
- Location within West Bengal Location within India
- Places and tea estates in the north-western portion of Darjeeling Sadar subdivision (including Darjeeling Pulbazar CD block) in Darjeeling district. Key: C: census town, R: rural/ urban centre, N: neighbourhood, H: hill centre, P: national park/ wildlife sanctuary, T: tourist attraction Abbreviations used in names – G for Tea Garden (town/village), E for Tea Estate; Mouse over shows names of tea estates. Owing to space constraints in the small map, the locations in the larger map on click through may vary slightly.
- Location: Darjeeling district, West Bengal, India
- Parent range: Darjeeling Himalayan hill region

Tiger Hill (2,590 metres (8,500 ft)) is a mountain located in Darjeeling, in the Indian State of West Bengal. It has a panoramic view of Mount Everest and Mount Kanchenjunga together.

== Geography ==
It is 11 kilometres (6.8 miles) from the town of Darjeeling and can be reached either by jeep or by foot through Chowrasta, Alubari or Jorebangla and then climbing up the incline to the summit.

== Views ==
At sunrise, the peaks of Kanchenjunga (8,598 metres (28,209 ft)) are illuminated before the sun is seen at lower elevations. From Tiger Hill, Mount Everest (8,848 metres (29,029 ft)), Makalu (8,481 metres (27,825 ft)) and Lhotse (8,516 metres (27,940 ft)) are just visible. Kanchenjunga looks higher than Mt. Everest, as it is several miles closer than Everest. The distance in a straight line from Tiger Hill to Everest is 107 miles (172 km).

On a clear day, Kurseong is visible to the south and in the distance, along with Teesta River, Mahananda River, Balason River and Mechi River meandering down to the south. Chumal Rhi mountain of Tibet, 84 miles (135 km) away, is visible over the Chola range.

Senchal Wildlife Sanctuary is close to Tiger Hill.

== See also ==
- Chowrasta Darjeeling
- Mahakal Temple Darjeeling

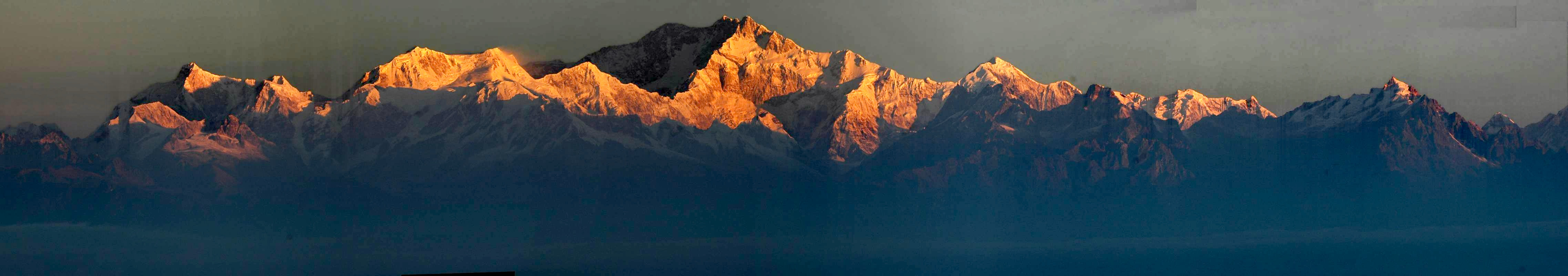
Panorama of the Kangchenjunga massif from Darjeeling's Tiger Hill

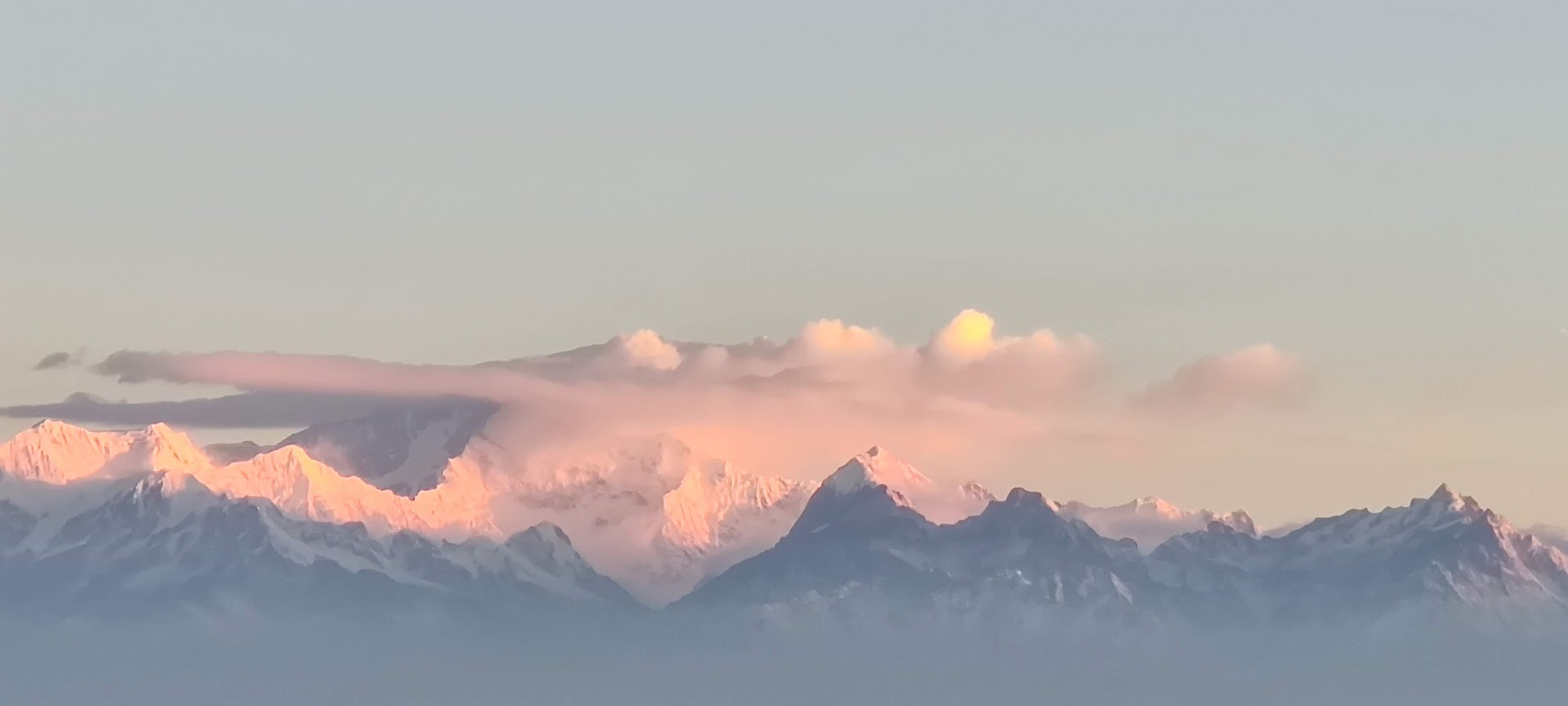
View of mountains from Tiger Hill, just before the sun is visible.
