= Hao Liang =

Contemporary Chinese artist (born 1983)

Hao Liang (born 1983, Chinese: 郝量; pinyin: Hǎo Liàng) is a contemporary Chinese artist based in Beijing.

== Early life and education ==
Born in 1983 in Chengdu, Sichuan in China, Hao studied Fine Arts in Chinese Painting Department at Sichuan Fine Arts Institute, Chongqing, China, where he received his bachelor's degree and master's degree in 2006 and 2009 respectively. He was awarded Luo Zhongli Scholarship as the first recipient in the Chinese painting genre in 2009.

Hao started to visit art museums at an early age given that he was born in Chengdu, a city with rich cultural history. Growing up in a film family – his grandfather was a movie director, and his father was a producer. Under the influence of his godmother's father, who was a collector of Chinese art and a student of Zhang Daqian. Hao was exposed to art, film, and literature at a young age. Upon graduation from the Sichuan Fine Arts Institute, he initially considered becoming a teacher. However, the encouragement from artist Xu Lei has prompted him to pursue a career as a full-time artist.

== Artistic career ==
Since the debut of Hao's artistic career in 2009, he has been included in various group exhibitions around the world, from Chongqing, Shanghai, Beijing, Shenzhen, to Seoul. His first solo exhibition was held at My Humble House Art Gallery, Taipei, in 2011.

Hao's first solo show in mainland China was in 2014, titled Secluded and Infinite Places: Hao Liang Solo Exhibition, organized by the Hive Centre for Contemporary Art in Beijing. In the same year, Vitamin Creative Space brought Hao's works to the Foire Internationale d'Art Contemporain (FIAC) in Paris. His paintings, Passage from Xian to Ghost, was on view at the art fair. This work later entered the permanent collection of Centre Pompidou.

In 2016, Hao's large-scale painting, Eight Views of Xiaoxiang was featured in a solo show at the Ullens Centre for Contemporary Art, Beijing. He deliberately depicted traditional sceneries in a distinct way that offers a multifaceted perspective to viewers. In 2017, Eight Views of Xiaoxiang was featured in the central exhibition of the 57th Venice Biennale – where he was one of the youngest participants. His work was also included in the group exhibition, Stream and Mountains without End: Landscape Traditions of China at the Metropolitan Museum of Art, New York.

In 2017, Gagosian announced the representation of Hao Liang. He is one of the three Chinese artists that the gallery represents. In 2018, Gagosian organized his first solo exhibition in the United States, titled Portraits and Wonders. In his show, the Stream and Mountains without End is a 37-foot-long silk scroll artwork with a mix of figuration and abstraction. The work marked his increasing emphasis on symbols and metaphorical elements. He transformed mountains and trees into geometrical forms under the influence and inspiration from the Cubist compositions of Pablo Picasso, Wassily Kandinsky's abstraction, and the style of landscapes by the Ming dynasty artist and scholar Dong Qichang.

In 2019, he created an installation, Circular Pond, which combined elements of painting, rubbings, documents, collotype prints, and antique jade. The work was exhibited at the Aurora Museum, Shanghai.

In 2021, his work was included in The Dream of the Museum, the inaugural exhibition at M+, Hong Kong, which is one of the works in the M+'s permanent collection. The 10th Asia Pacific Triennial of Contemporary Art (APT10), Queensland Art Gallery and Gallery of Modern Art, Brisbane, Australia also featured his works in the same year.

== Artistic approach ==
Working with traditional Chinese ink painting's (guohua) medium and techniques, Hao's globalist, cross-generational perspective is at the core of his artistic expression.

His ink paintings on silk feature landscapes and portraits. Chinese artists such as Fan Kuan, Dong Qichang, Ding Yunpeng and an anonymous artist who created Hundred Flowers Scroll in the Song dynasty; Western artists including Roger van der Weyden, Georges Seurat, Wassily Kandinsky, they all served as inspiration for Hao.

Through his extensive research and reading practice, Hao works to combine the techniques, themes, motifs, and traditions of Chinese paintings with a touch of contemporary spin. In addition, he explores and incorporates themes around films, literature, and philosophy in his work, hoping to challenge the foundation and boundaries of ancient ways of painting.

Moreover, Hao's works evolved around the perspectives of temporality. Traditional Chinese artists tend to portray time ambitiously and eternally, whereas Hao sees time as the present moment in his works. Creating artwork is a process of exercising his technical skills and utilizing his art history knowledge. At the same time, it is also a way to reflect on lived experience.

== Public collections ==
Hao's works have been collected among various art institutions worldwide, including the Metropolitan Museum of Art, New York; the British Museum, London; Centre Georges Pompidou, Paris; Bonnefantenmuseum, Maastricht; Kadist Art Foundation, San Francisco and Paris; M+, Hong Kong; Asia Society, Hong Kong; Gallery of Modern Art, Brisbane, Australia; and the Art Gallery of New South Wales, Sydney, Australia.
