= Taking Tiger Mountain by Strategy (film) =

- Traditional Chinese: 智取威虎山
- Simplified Chinese: 智取威虎山
- Hanyu Pinyin: zhì qǔ wēihǔ shān
- Directed by: Xie Tieli
- Starring: Shen Jinbo; Tong Jiling
- Production company: Beijing Film Studio
- Release date: 1970
- Running time: 129 minutes
- Country: China
- Language: Mandarin

Taking Tiger Mountain by Strategy (Chinese: 智取威虎山; pinyin: Zhìqǔ Wēihǔ Shān) is a Chinese film from 1970, during the height of the Cultural Revolution. The film was directed by Xie Tieli and was based on a contemporary Beijing opera, one of the eight model plays allowed during the Cultural Revolution. The story is based on the novel Lin hai xue yuan (林海雪原), and tells the story of an incident in 1946, during the Chinese Civil War.

Taking Tiger Mountain by Strategy has been identified as one of the most watched films of all time. Official Chinese government statistics claimed a total audience of 7.3 billion through the end of 1974, meaning every citizen of China had seen the film at least seven times. The large audience can be attributed to the fact that few films were produced during the Cultural Revolution, and almost all earlier films were banned; nevertheless, the average village held ten film showings per year, and failure to attend could have been seen as a sign of political deviation. Hence, Chinese citizens would have been expected to see the film multiple times during the Cultural Revolution era.
