= Raid on the White Tiger Regiment =

Chinese revolutionary Opera in the Cultural Revolution

- Traditional Chinese: 奇襲白虎團
- Simplified Chinese: 奇袭白虎团
Transcriptions
Standard Mandarin
- Hanyu Pinyin: Qíxí Báihǔtuán
- Wade–Giles: Ch'i^{2}-hsi^{2} Pai^{2}-hu^{3}-t'uan^{2}

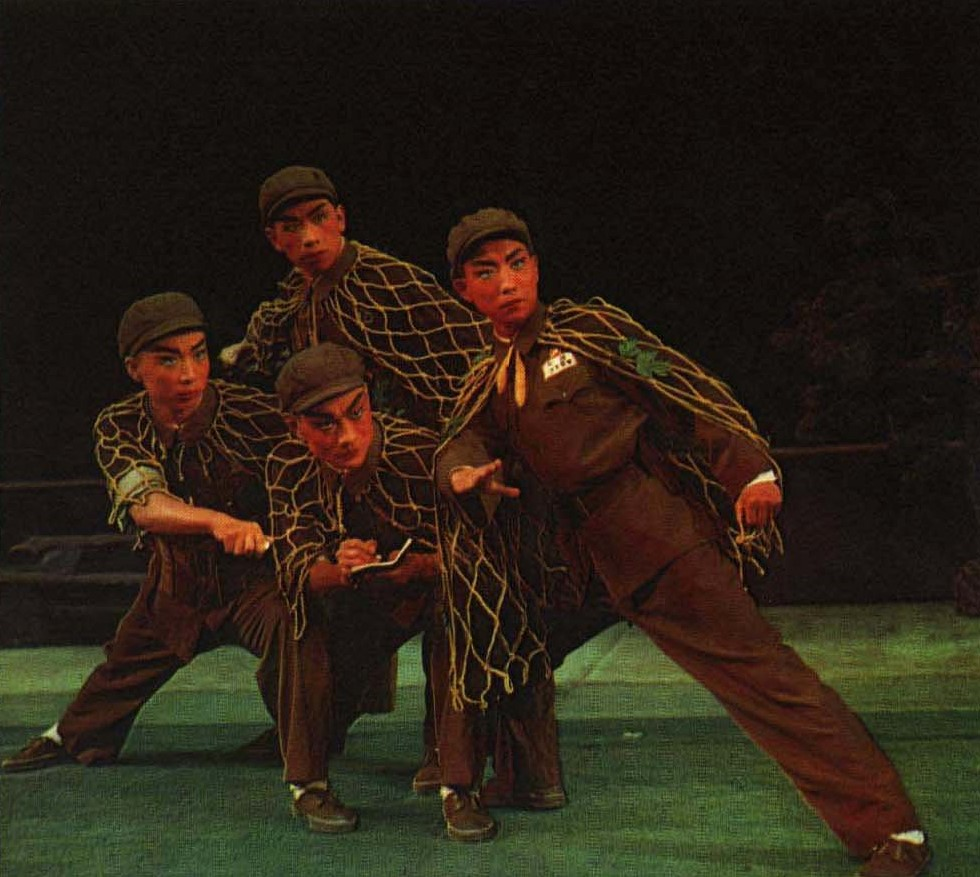
Image from a 1967 performance of Raid on the White Tiger Regiment

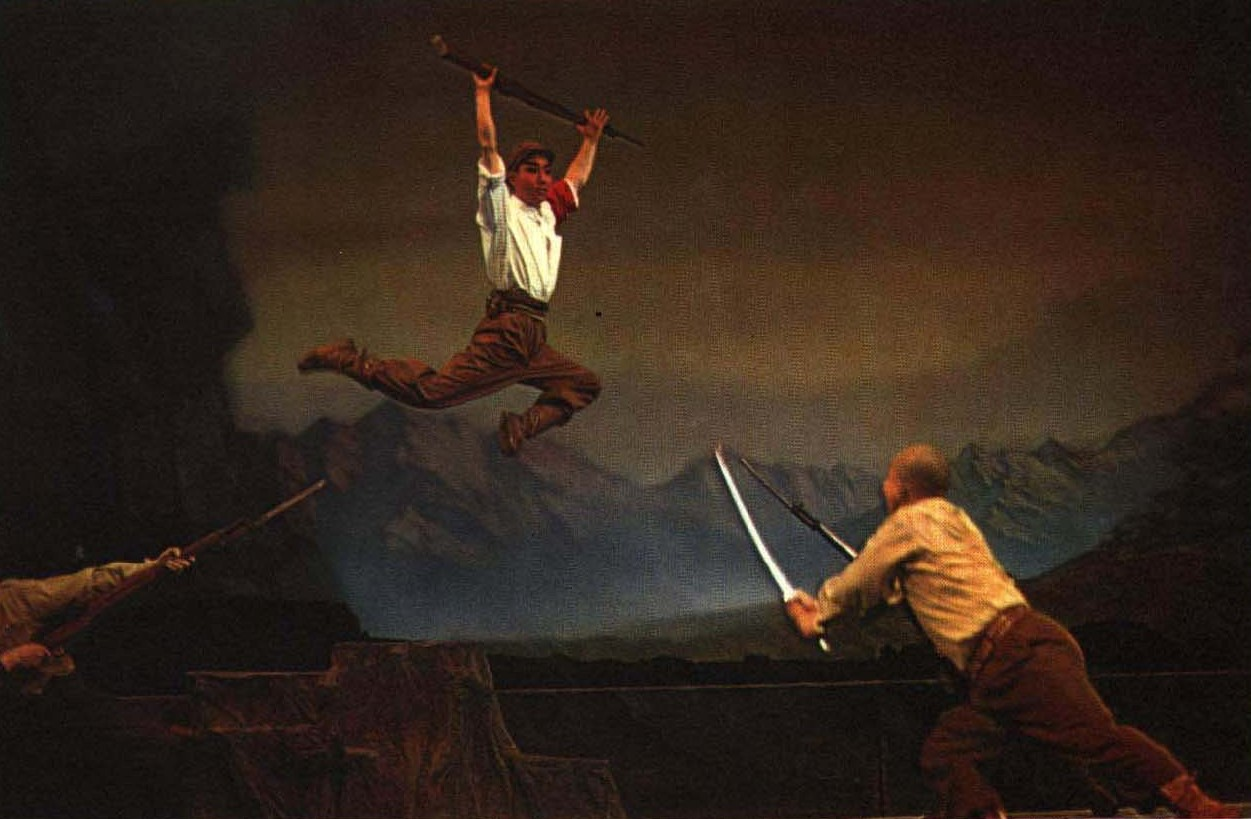
Image from a China Pictorial article on the opera

Raid on the White Tiger Regiment (Chinese: 奇袭白虎团) is a Chinese revolutionary opera and one of the eight "model plays" permitted during the Cultural Revolution. Set during the Korean War, it depicts a victory of the Chinese and North Korean forces over South Korean and American forces.

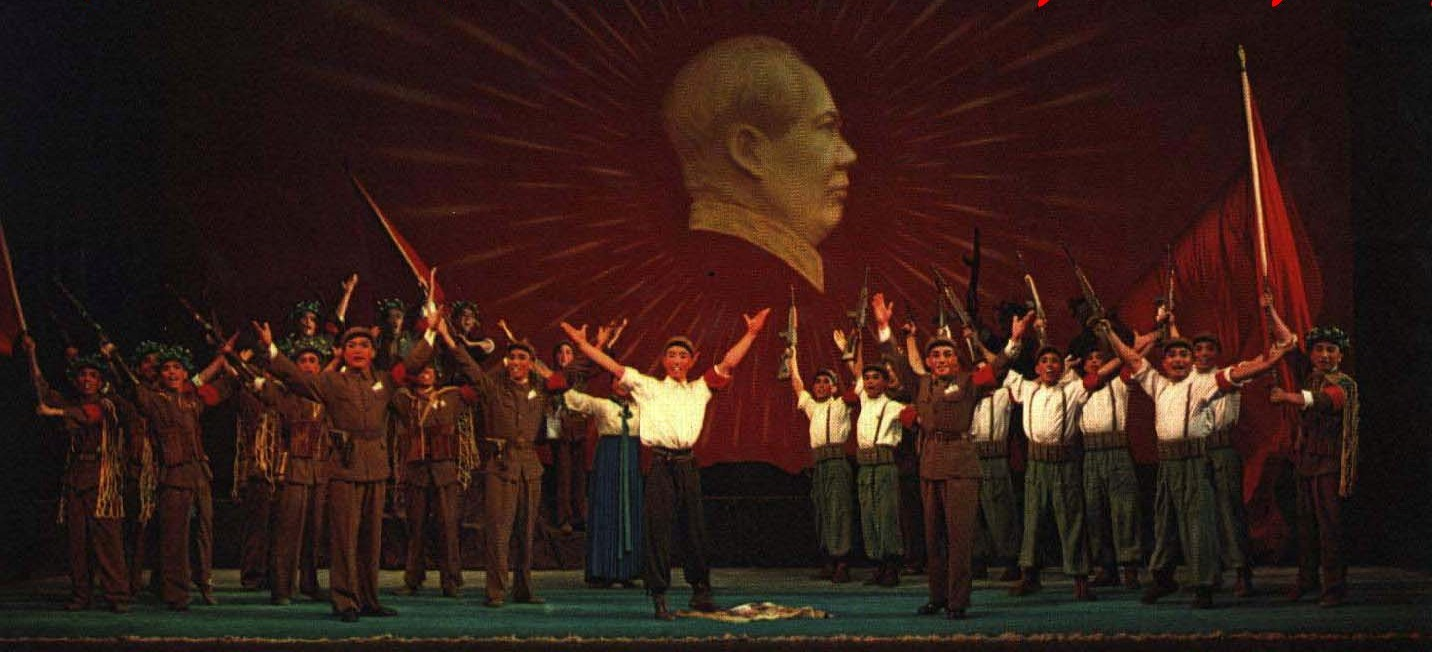
Image from a performance

== Production ==
Music for Raid on the White Tiger Regiment was composed and arranged by Gong Guotai (born 1946), incorporating some aspects of Korean folk music; the script was collaboratively written in 1957 by four members of Shandong Provincial Peking Opera Troupe, and was first performed by members of the People's Volunteer Army. It received its first major staging in 1964 at a national Peking opera festival; it was revised under Mao Zedong's instructions in 1965–66. The Cambridge History of China noted that continuous revision of the model operas tended to remove any "shades of grey" from the moral depictions of the heroes and villains, and to remove any trace of "bourgeois" behaviour from the heroes.

== Synopsis ==
July 1953: during the Korean War, Yang Yucai leads a People's Volunteer Army raid against the White Tiger Regiment of the South Korean Capital Mechanized Infantry Division, who are planning to sabotage peace talks by invading the North. With the help of a Korean girl, Sister Choi, the Chinese troops destroy Tiger Regiment HQ and set the conditions for a successful counterattack, in cooperation with the Korean People's Army.

== Performance ==
Deng Xiaoping refused to watch Raid on the White Tiger Regiment in 1964, instead insisting on a performance of Sisters Exchange Bridegrooms; this was perceived as a slight on the Gang of Four.

In 1972, it was made into a film by the Changchun Film Studio.
