= Revolutionary opera =

Genre of Chinese opera

- Traditional Chinese: 樣板戲
- Simplified Chinese: 样板戏
- Literal meaning: model operas
Transcriptions
Standard Mandarin
- Hanyu Pinyin: yàngbǎnxì
- Wade–Giles: yang^{4} pan^{3} hsi^{4}
- IPA: [jâŋpànɕî]

In mainland China, revolutionary operas or model operas (Chinese: 样板戏; pinyin: yàngbǎnxì) were a series of shows planned and engineered during the Cultural Revolution (1966–1976) by Jiang Qing, the wife of Chairman Mao Zedong. They were considered revolutionary and modern in terms of thematic and musical features when compared with traditional Chinese operas. Many of them were adapted to film.

Originally, eight revolutionary operas (Chinese: 八个样板戏; pinyin: Ba Ge Yangban Xi) were produced, eighteen by the end of the period. Instead of the "emperors, kings, generals, chancellors, maidens, and beauties" of the traditional Peking opera, which was banned as "feudalistic and bourgeois", they told stories from China's recent revolutionary struggles against foreign and class enemies. They glorified the People's Liberation Army and the bravery of the common people, and showed Mao Zedong and his thought as playing the central role in the victory of communism in China. Although they originated as operas, they soon appeared on LPs, in comic books (lianhuanhua), on posters, postcards, and stamps; on plates, teapots, wash basins, cigarette packages, vases, and calendars. They were performed or played from loudspeakers in schools, factories, and fields by special performing troupes. The eight model operas dominated the stage in all parts of the country during these years, leading to the joke "Eight operas for Eight hundred million people".

== Origin ==
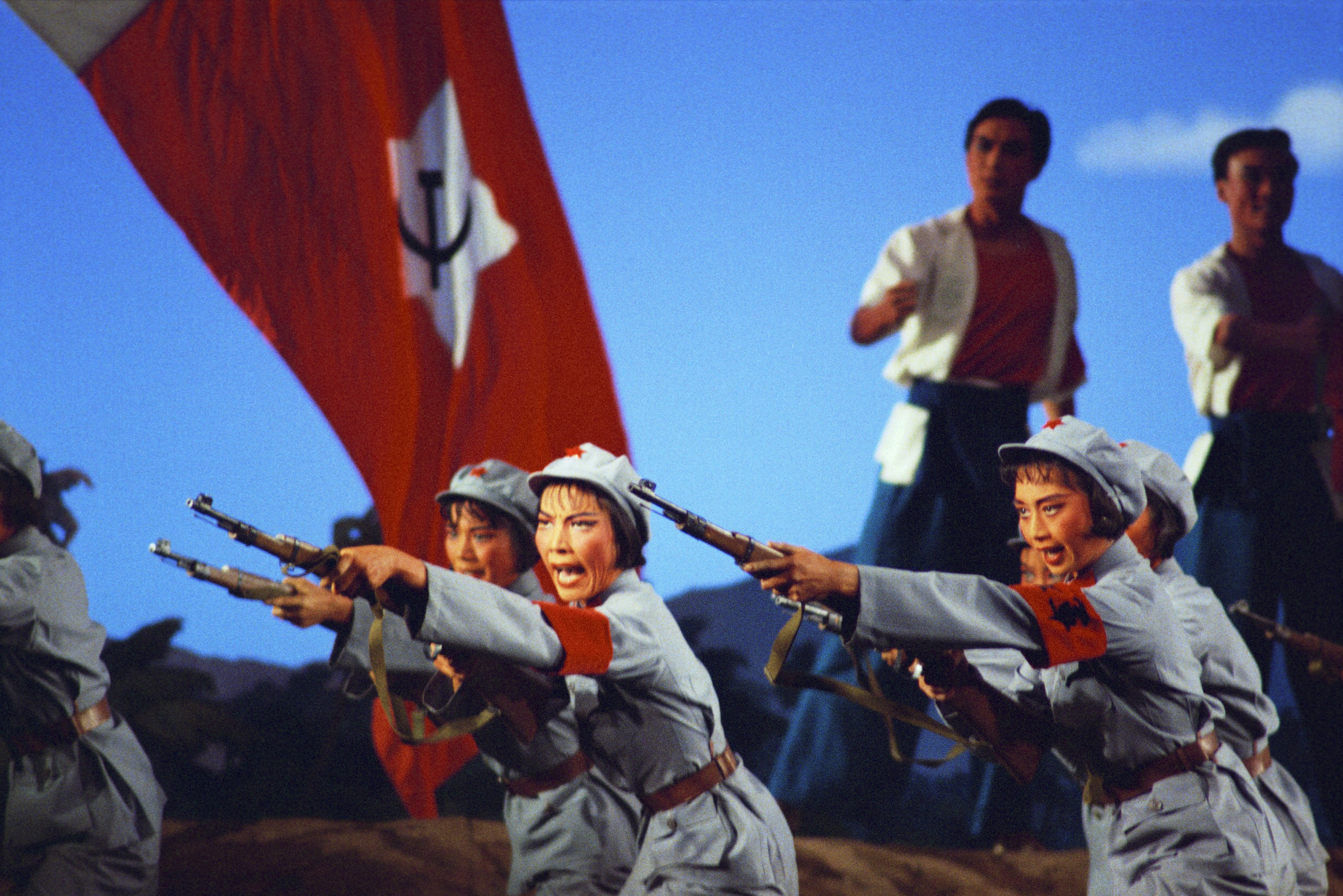
The Red Detachment of Women

Precursors of revolutionary opera existed during the Republican era, when Nationalist officials and rural reformers such as the Mass Education Movement pushed for various opera reform initiatives that sought to use theatre performances to inculcate their desired objectives of abolishing certain traditional customs and strengthening national identity. Nationalist officials also coerced local village leaders to replace religious festivals with reform opera through police involvement. The Communists only began to use opera as a method of mass mobilization in the late 1940s when they began land reform programs in areas under their control.

Jiang Qing was the chief advocate and engineer of the transformation from traditional operas to revolutionary ones, and chose the Peking opera as her "laboratory experimentation" for accomplishing this radical change in theater art. The traditional Peking opera was revolutionized in both form and content. Eight model plays were produced in the first three years of the Cultural Revolution. They consisted of five modern operas (The Legend of the Red Lantern, Shajiabang, Taking Tiger Mountain by Strategy, Raid on the White Tiger Regiment, and On the Docks), two ballets (Red Detachment of Women and The White-Haired Girl), and one symphony (also Shajiabang, which is more precisely a cantata).

The official versions of the operas were all Peking operas and were produced by either the China Peking Opera House or the Shanghai Peking Opera House, although many of them were subsequently adapted to local provincial types of operas. The ballets were produced by either the National Ballet of China or the Shanghai Ballet Company. Shajiabang was musically expanded to a symphony with a full Western orchestra, a format similar to the ninth symphony of Beethoven, with an overture and 8 movements. The Legend of the Red Lantern was also adapted to a piano-accompanied cantata by the pianist Yin Chengzong, which was basically a cycle of arias excerpted from the opera.

After 1969 several other model operas were produced, including Azalea Mountain, Battle in the Plains, and Bay of Panshi, following the original model in content and form. However it was the original eight plays that were most commonly performed. Toward the end of the Cultural Revolution, the ballet Red Detachment of Women was adapted to a Peking opera, while the Peking opera The Azalea Mountain was adapted to a ballet. These did not have a chance to become as popular as their earlier versions, and the ballet version of The Azalea Mountain was never officially released.

== National implementation ==
Model operas were performed on stages, broadcast on the radio, made into films, and sung by millions. They were the only form of mass theatrical entertainment in China at the time. Unlike European opera, which was essentially entertainment for the elite, revolutionary opera had become a popular political art. Many ordinary Chinese citizens were familiar with the arias in these model operas and would sing them at home or on the streets. Mobile film units brought cinematic recordings of the operas into the countryside and played an important role in popularizing and standardizing the art form. The revolutionary operas were regarded as some of the newborn socialist things (shehuizhuyi xinsheng shiwu) arising during the Cultural Revolution.

During the Cultural Revolution, one way China promoted its policy of state feminism was through revolutionary opera. Most of the eight model dramas in this period featured women as their main characters. The narratives of these women protagonists begin with them oppressed by misogyny, class position, and imperialism before liberating themselves through the discovery of their own internal strength and the Communist Party. Villains in the revolutionary operas were consistently male.

The new revolutionary theatrical forms were praised as "shining victories" of the Cultural Revolution and Mao Zedong Thought. An article published in the Red Flag journal under a pen name stated, "The glorious achievement of revolutionary operas marked a revolution in art by the proletariat. It is the major component of our country's proletarian cultural revolution. ... In the series of revolutionary model operas nurtured by beloved Comrade Jiang Qing, the image of proletarian heroes is established; the stage that has been controlled by landlords and representatives of the bourgeoisie for the past thousand years is now gone. The real master of history has entered the field of art and started a new era in the history of art".

The major characters of the yangbanxi demonstrated the behaviors which government officials were supposed to demonstrate: accepting hardship first and enjoyment later, focusing on the livelihood of the masses, denouncing oppressive behavior, and using persuasion to deal with difficult people. Thus they both provided a standard of conduct for officials and expressed a standard for ordinary people to hold them to.

The operas are often taken by their critics as paradigmatic of the proletarian-dominated art of the Cultural Revolution, and have been condemned by some as an aesthetic and cultural aberration. Author Huo Wang, a citizen in China at the time, wrote in 1998 in reference to the Cultural Revolution era: "Model operas are the only art form left in the whole of China. You cannot escape from listening to them. You hear them every time you turn on the radio. You hear them from loudspeakers every time you go outside".

In her book Red Azalea, Anchee Min describes her experiences with revolutionary operas. She became a fan initially because there were not many other forms of diversion. "Entertainment was a 'dirty bourgeois word'", but the revolutionary operas were supposed to be something else, "a proletarian statement". To love or not to love the operas was a serious political question, Min writes, and "meant to be or not to be a revolutionary". For a decade the same eight operas were taught on radio and in school, and were promoted by neighborhood organizations. Min recalls:

I listened to the operas when I ate, walked and slept. I grew up with the operas. They became my cells. I decorated the porch with posters of my favorite opera heroines. I sang the operas wherever I went. My mother heard me singing in my dreams; she said that I was preserved by the operas. It was true. I could not go on a day without listening to the operas. I pasted my ear close to the radio, figuring out the singer's breaths. I imitated her. The aria was called "I won't quit the battle until all the beasts are killed". It was sung by Iron Plum a teenage character in an opera called The Red Lantern. I would not stop singing the aria until my vocal cords hurt. I went on pushing my voice to its highest pitch. I was able to recite all the librettos ...

An official yangbanxi popularization campaign began in 1970. The release of filmed versions of yangbanxi prompted the re-organization and expansion of China's film exhibition network.

The promotion of yangbanxi through official channels also surged in 1974 in connection with the Criticize Lin, Criticize Confucius campaign.

=== Foreign exchanges ===
The yangbanxi were a staple of cultural exchanges in the years leading to China-United States rapprochement. American tourist groups in China during the early 1970s typically included at least one of The White Haired Girl or the Red Detachment of Women in their itineraries. Richard Nixon and Henry Kissinger viewed The Red Detachment of Women.

== List of revolutionary model plays ==
=== The eight model plays ===
- The Legend of the Red Lantern (红灯记), Peking opera
- Shajiabang (沙家浜, formerly romanised as Shachiapang), Peking opera
- Taking Tiger Mountain by Strategy (智取威虎山), Peking opera
- Raid on the White Tiger Regiment (奇袭白虎团), Peking opera
- On the Docks (海港, also known as The Harbor), Peking opera
- Red Detachment of Women (红色娘子军), ballet
- The White Haired Girl (白毛女), ballet

=== Later model plays ===
- The Azalea Mountain (杜鹃山), Peking opera
- Song of the Dragon River (龙江颂), Peking opera
- The Warfare on the Plain (平原作战), Peking opera
- Panshiwan (磐石湾), Peking opera
- Red Detachment of Women the Peking opera
- Interrogating the Chair (审椅子), Peking opera
- Ode to the Yimeng Mountains (沂蒙颂), ballet
- The Brother and Sister on the Prairie (草原儿女), ballet

== After the Cultural Revolution ==
Although these works bear unmistakable political overtones of the time when they were created, they nonetheless had significant artistic values, and for this reason, some of the works remain popular decades after the Cultural Revolution. As academic Kazushi Minami observes, many people, especially rural people, cherished the yangbanxi and still do today. Some of the eight model revolutionary operas have been sent on tours around the world without much of its original political content. According to Liu Kang from Duke University:

During a 1996 North American tour, the China Central Ballet repeatedly performed The Red Detachment of Women as its grand finale, which caused postmodern audiences in Los Angeles and New York to marvel at the opera's innovative multipositionality and hybridity, in which revolutionary ideologies, exotic nativist music and dances of the Li ethnic minority on Hainan Island, and high European styles and modalities coalesce in a neo-Wagnerian Gesamtkunstwerk.

The three most popular Peking operas are The Legend of the Red Lantern, Shajiabang, and Taking Tiger Mountain by Strategy. And the ballet that still shows a considerable vitality today is Red Detachment of Women, the one that was presented to Richard Nixon, President of the United States, who visited China in 1972, seven years before the normalization of the Sino-US relationship. This performance was reenacted in a slightly surreal form in John Adams's opera Nixon in China (1985–87).

The eight model plays were the subject of the 2005 documentary film Yangbanxi, The Eight Model Works. The film Farewell My Concubine (1993), set in a Peking Opera company, shows the tension and debates within the group when the revolutionary opera replaced the old.

== See also ==
- Propaganda in China
- List of campaigns of the Chinese Communist Party

== Bibliography ==
=== Sources ===
- Clark, Paul (2008). The Chinese Cultural Revolution: A History. Cambridge; New York: Cambridge University Press. ISBN 978-0-521-87515-8.. Explores the culture produced including the eight "model operas".
- Coderre, Laurence (2021). Newborn Socialist Things : Materiality in Maoist China. Durham: Duke University Press. p. 30. ISBN 978-1-4780-2161-2. OCLC 1250021710.
- Snow, Lois Wheeler (1972). China on Stage: An American Actress in the People's Republic. New York: Random House. ISBN 0394468740.. A sympathetic eyewitness account. Includes texts of several plays, and a glossary of Chinese theater and dance terms.
