= Tuxedo Ridge Ski Center =

Ski area in New York, US

Coordinates: 41°14′46″N 74°13′38″W

- Interactive map of Tuxedo Ridge Ski Center
- Location: 581 Rt. 17A; Tuxedo, New York, US
- Nearest city: Tuxedo Park, New York
- Top elevation: 1,200 ft (370 m)
- Base elevation: 800 ft (240 m)
- Trails: 7
- Longest run: Tiger Pass
- Lift system: 4 chairs: 4 Doubles
- Snowfall: 40 inches
- Website: Tuxedo Ridge Ski Center

Tuxedo Ridge Ski Center was a ski area located in Tuxedo, New York, which offered lift serviced skiing and riding on 7 trails. The center originally opened in 1962 as Sterling Forest Ski Area. It operated under this name for several decades and gained popularity due to its proximity to New York City. After not opening for several seasons due to low snowfall and declining visits, the mountain reopened under new management in January 2007 after being purchased by Novenogan Development who changed the name to Tuxedo Ridge. Tuxedo Ridge was later owned and operated by James Mezzetti. Tuxedo Ridge did not open up for the 2015/2016 season.

== The mountain ==
Tuxedo Ridge featured 100 skiable acres on 7 trails located on a mountain known locally as Tiger mountain. The mountain is a part of the Sterling Forest State Park. The trails included a "bunny slope" with teaching area, numerous intermediate runs, a NASTAR racing course and a terrain park. The mountain also had a lift serviced tubing center and was lighted for night skiing.

Tuxedo Ridge LLC also offered paintball, concerts, and event space during the off-season. The mountain is adjacent to the site of the New York Renaissance Faire, which occurs on weekends during August and September and is still in operation. In June the mountain hosts the New York Spartan Sprint, a component event of the Reebok Spartan Race.

== Closing ==
Tuxedo Ridge did not open up for the 2015/2016 season, and there is no opening date for the 2016/2017 season. This was prompted by legal issues with the property after the site was sought after by Genting Americas, hoping to rejuvenate the site and build a casino nearby. It is likely this was a result of the State Gaming Commission denying the request for a casino license for the site.
