= Qu Bo (writer) =

Chinese novelist

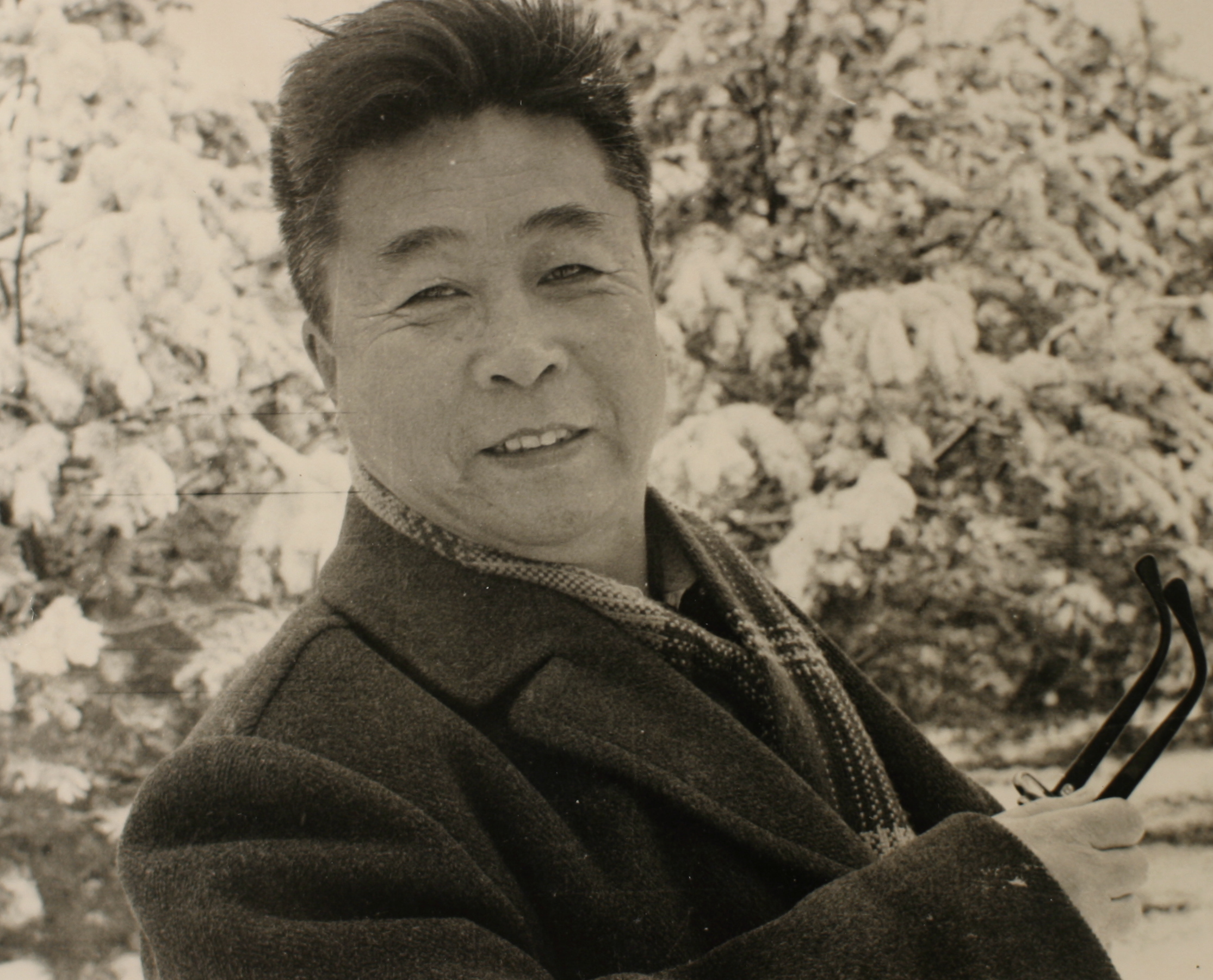
- Qu Bo at Purple Bamboo Park
- Born: Qu Qingtao (曲清涛); 1923; Longkou, Shandong, Republic of China
- Died: 2002 (aged 78–79); Beijing, People's Republic of China
- Spouse: Liu Bo (刘波) (1924-2024)
- Children: Miao Miao Qu （曲淼淼） (daughter); Jing Jing Qu （曲晶晶） (son); Lei Lei Qu (son); Cui Cui Qu（曲毳毳） (daughter)

Qu Bo (Chinese: 曲波; pinyin: Qū Bō; birth name Qu Qingtao 曲清涛; 22 February 1923 – 27 June 2002), also romanized as Chu Po, was a Chinese novelist whose works were inspired by his experiences as a soldier during the Chinese Civil War. He is best known for his debut novel, Tracks in the Snowy Forest (《林海雪原》, 1957), one of the most influential works of twentieth-century Chinese popular literature. The novel has been translated into numerous languages and adapted into films, television series, Peking opera, ballet, and musicals, including the internationally known film The Taking of Tiger Mountain.

== Biography ==
Born in Zaolinzhuang Village (枣林庄; Zǎolín Zhuāng), Huang County (now Longkou), at the north-east coast of Shandong province, Qu Bo's early education was through a private school where he started to gain his sound knowledge of Chinese classical literature and succinct language skills. His father, Qu Chunyang (曲春阳; Qǔ Chūnyáng) and mother, Qu Liushi (曲刘氏; Qǔ Liúshì) owned a small business of cotton dyeing.

In 1938, at the age of 15, he left home and fought in the war against the Japanese invasion (Second Sino-Japanese War). His name was changed from his childhood name Qu Qingtao (曲清涛; Qǔ Qīngtāo) into Qu Bo by the officials of the Eighth Route Army. Qu Bo had further education at the Counter-Japanese Military and Political University in Shandong and became a journalist of an army newspaper, The Progress. The army turned into the People's Liberation Army after the Japanese surrendered, and Qu Bo continued to battle in the Chinese Civil War in the northeast of China, protecting the regional civilians from robbery and killings by the regional bandits and brigands. In the army, he served as a young literacy teacher, a political commissar and finally a colonel. In 1946 he married Liu Bo (刘波; Liú Bō) who was a head nurse of a hospital at the same army regional headquarters.

During the communist regime after 1949, Qu Bo worked in the railway industry and the Ministry of Machinery until his retirement, and lived in Beijing for the rest of his life.

Qu Bo was an active member of the China Writers'Association, and was recognised as a Chinese contemporary writer in the history of Chinese Literature. He had, however, never stopped his full-time industrial management jobs and only wrote books and articles during his spare time. He visited Russia, Pakistan and England as an author as well as industrial director. His novels were made into films, Beijing Opera musicals and TV shows.

== Published works ==
=== Novels ===
- Tracks in the Snowy Forest (《林海雪原》)(1957), People's Literature Publishing House 人民文学出版社. A tale of a small group of selected soldiers who went into the snowy mountains searching and fighting dangerous hidden bandits and brigands.

1,560,000 copies of (《林海雪原》) were printed during 1957–1964 in three editions. The book was translated into English, Russian, Japanese, Korean, Vietnamese, Mongolian, Norwegian and Arabic. A film adaptation of the novel was made in 1960. A later film adaptation titled The Taking of Tiger Mountain was released December 23, 2014.

- Roar of the Mountains and the Seas (《山呼海啸》) (1977), China Youth Press 中国青年出版社. An adventure story and romance set in Shandong Province during the Second Sino-Japanese War. The writing was completed before the Cultural Revolution and the publication was delayed for more than 10 years.
- Qiao Longbiao (《桥隆飚》) (1979), People's Literature Press 人民文学出版社. A tale of a patriotic hero who was later enlisted into the communist forces during the war against Japanese. The book was completed before the Cultural Revolution, but again the publication was delayed for more than 10 years.
- Stele of Rong E (《戎萼碑》) (1977), Shandong People's Publishing House 山东人民出版社. A story reflecting the importance of Chinese women in the war against Japanese.
- Complete Works of Qu Bo (《曲波全集》) (2013), People's Literature Publishing House or Ren min wen xue chu ban she 人民文学出版社. ISBN 9787020090013.

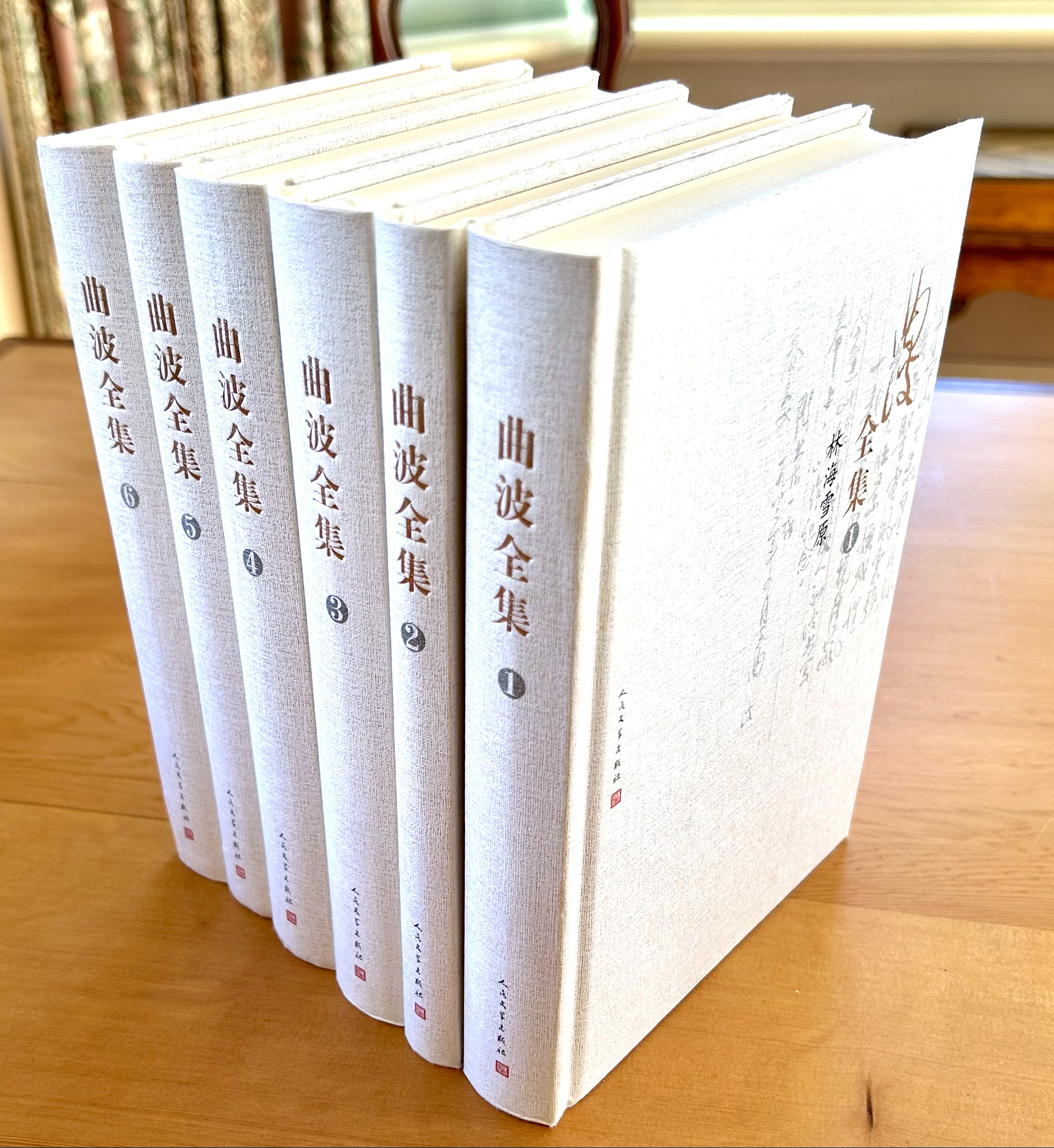

=== Short stories ===
Mostly about daily life in an industrial frontier, e.g. (《热处理》) (1959), (《争吵》) (1960).

=== Prose ===
Mostly travel writings and features (《散观平武》) (1962) (《澳洲遥祭洛兄》) (1994).
