= Hao Ran =

Chinese writer

Hao Ran (Chinese: 浩然; 1932 – February 20, 2008) was the pen name of Liang Jinguang (梁金广), a modern Chinese writer. His work Sunny Days was praised by Jiang Qing. In 1977, he joined the Revolutionary Committee of Beijing. His autobiography was published in 2000.

== Works ==
- 《金光大道》.The Golden Road 1972
