= On the Docks =

Chinese revolutionary Opera in the Cultural Revolution

On the Docks (Chinese: 海港; pinyin: hǎi gǎng) is a Chinese revolutionary opera and one of the eight model plays available during the Cultural Revolution. it was the first revolutionary opera with a story about working peasants eagerly accepting the responsibility of militant struggle. The creation of the drama was inspired by Mao Zedong's publication Talks at the Yan'an Forum on Literature and Art, whose agenda was the development of social entertainment for workers, peasants, and soldiers. His wife Jiang Qing played a significant role in devising both the words and the music, which at times led to a power struggle with Liu Shaoqi over the opera's ideological message. The director Xie Jin staged the original production in the early 1960s and also filmed the story in 1972. A different film of the same play was released in 1973.

== Synopsis ==
The story of On the Docks originates on the Huangpu River in Shanghai where workers are preparing rice shipments to Africa. It is the summer of 1963 and the loading process is overseen by Party Branch Secretary and hero Fang Hai Chen who ensures the boat leaves on time so it arrives for sowing season. The villain, an undercover saboteur from the counter-revolutionaries, works as a dispatcher who manages to hide a weather forecast predicting an impending typhoon. He schemes to switch the rice with similar looking glass fiber to ruin the revolution's reputation and leave 2000 loads of wheat unprotected for the coming storm to destroy. The plot is defeated when Chen finds glass fiber mixed with rice and her corresponding investigation reveals the dastardly plan. Workers toil through the night and the shipments leave safely on time.

== Purpose ==
The moral of the opera is to reinforce the class struggle between peasant workers and the greedy bourgeois who have profited from the hardships of laborers during the Cultural Revolution. In addition, the tale instills the values of political responsibility, revolutionary heroism, international philanthropy, and selfless service to the Chinese and international communities. The idea of shipping abundant rice and grain to Africa also reflects the message of a successful and wealthy China to its audience during this era.
