= Senchal Wildlife Sanctuary =

Wildlife sanctuary in West Bengal, India

- IUCN category IV (habitat/species management area)
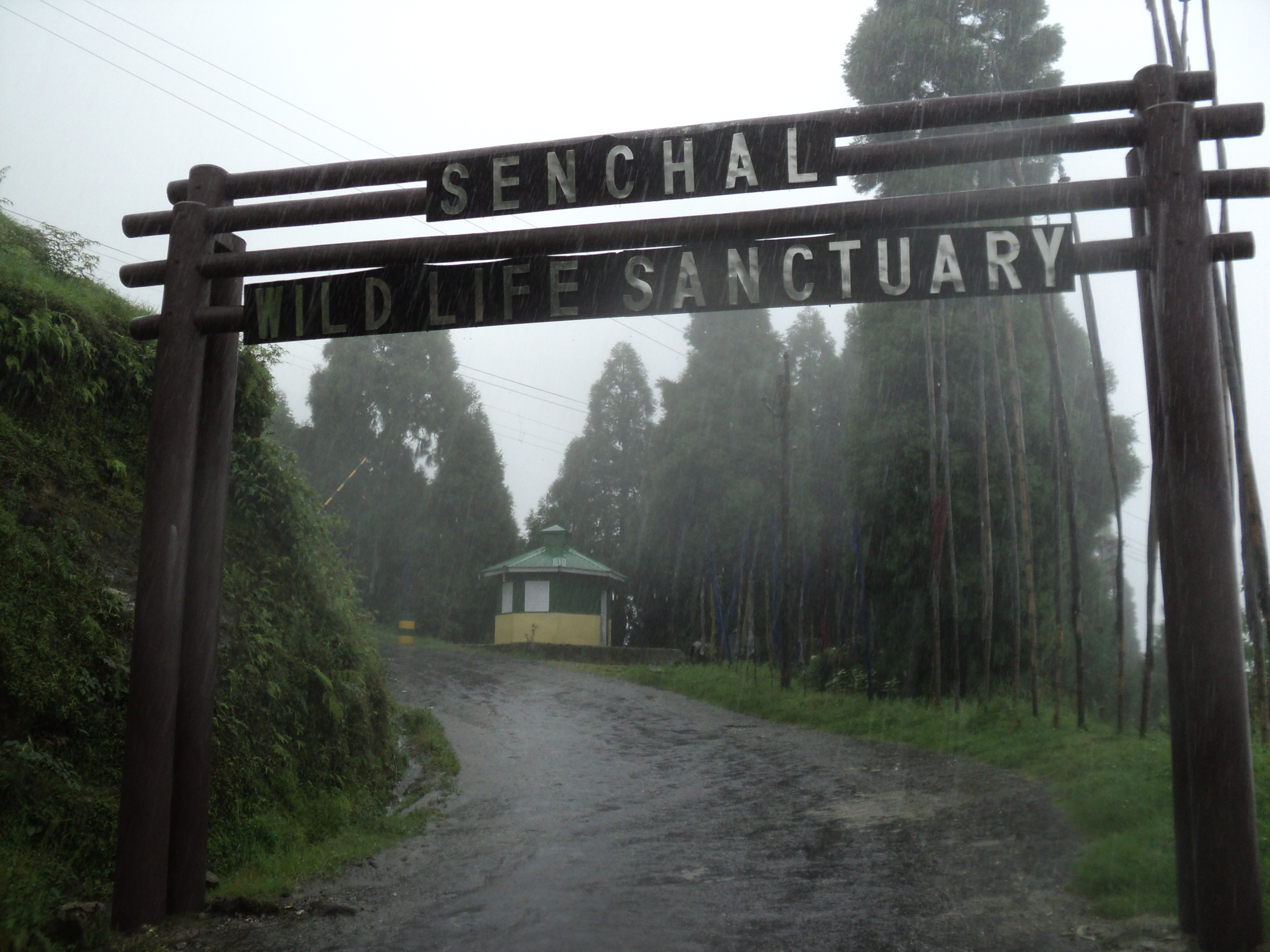
- Entrance to the Senchal Wildlife Sanctuary, Darjeeling

- Location within West Bengal Location within India
- Interactive map of Senchal Wildlife Sanctuary
- Location: Darjeeling District, West Bengal, India
- Coordinates: 26°59′38″N 88°15′55″E
- Area: 38.6 km^{2} (14.9 sq mi)
- Established: 1915; 111 years ago

Senchal Wildlife Sanctuary was set up in 1915 in the Darjeeling District of West Bengal, India.

== History ==
Senchal Wildlife Sanctuary was established in 1915.

== Geography ==
Senchal Wildlife Sanctuary covers an area of 38.6 km^{2} (14.9 sq mi). The elevation ranges from 1,500 to 2,600 m (4,900 to 8,500 ft).

== Ecology ==
Senchal Wildlife Sanctuary consists of natural and human-made forests. Oak is the most represented, followed by Kapasi, Katus, Kawla, Champ.

In 2022, a Satyr tragopan was sighted.

== Tourism ==
Darjeeling's first cycle-only trail was opened in the park in January 2017.
