= Xie Tieli =

Chinese film director

- Born: 27 December 1925; Huaiyin, Jiangsu, China
- Died: 19 June 2015 (aged 89); Beijing, China
- Occupation(s): director, writer
- Years active: 1959–2015
- Awards: Golden Rooster Awards – Best Director; 1990 A Dream of Red Mansions; Lifetime Achievement Award; 2005

Chinese name
- Traditional Chinese: 謝鐵驪
- Simplified Chinese: 谢铁骊
Transcriptions

Xie Tieli (27 December 1925 – 19 June 2015) was a Chinese director. In 2011, China Film Directors Guild Award awarded him the Lifetime Achievement Award.

== Selected filmography ==
Year	Title	Notes
1959	Nameless Island 无名岛	
1961	The Storm 暴风骤雨	
1963	Early Spring in February 早春二月	
1964	Never Forget The Lesson 永远不要忘记	
1970	The Taking of Tiger Mountain 智取威虎山	
1978	The Great River Flows On 大河奔流	
1980	The Stars Are Bright Tonight 今夜星光灿烂	Nominated - Golden Rooster Award for Best Director
1981	Zhi Yin 知音	
1988	A Dream of Red Mansions 红楼梦	Golden Rooster Award for Best Director
