= Roxane Witke =

American historian of China

Roxane Heater Witke (born 1938) is an American author and a historian of China. She is best known for her biography Comrade Chiang Ch’ing (1977), based on a week-long, sixty-hour interview with Jiang Qing in the summer of 1972. The interview was believed to have inspired The Red Empress (红都女皇), a purportedly risqué biography of Jiang published in Hong Kong in 1973 that threatened her political standing. Following the fall of the Gang of Four, Witke's interview was cited among the Chinese Communist Party’s charges against Jiang for leaking state secrets in pursuit of fame.

== Early life and education ==
Witke was born to Mr. and Mrs. William E. Heater of Los Altos, California. She received her bachelor's degree from Stanford University and a master's degree from the University of Chicago. She later earned a PhD degree in history from the University of California, Berkeley in 1970 with the thesis Transformations of Attitudes Towards Women During the May Fourth Era of Modern China, and was a Junior Fellow and Assistant Specialist of the Center for Chinese Studies when she was there.

== Career ==
After graduation, she became a professor of history at the State University of New York–Binghamton and a research associate of the East Asian Institute at Columbia University.

Motivated by her research on modern Chinese history and women’s issues, Witke sought to visit China to gain firsthand understanding of the country and to meet its female leaders. Through contacts with China’s delegation to the United Nations in New York, she obtained an invitation from the Chinese People’s Association for Friendship with Foreign Countries (CPAFFC). In the summer of 1972, she traveled to China in her personal capacity, with all expenses covered by the CPAFFC.

While in China, Witke submitted to her hosts a list of interviewees she hoped to meet, which included Jiang Qing, then a member of the Political Bureau of the Chinese Communist Party. After interviewing several historians, doctors, and artists, she was received by senior women’s leaders Deng Yingchao and Kang Keqing. The CPAFFC later reported her request to meet Jiang to Premier Zhou Enlai, who approved it, writing to Jiang: “If you are feeling well these days, you may meet this person for about one hour. If you do not wish to, you may decline.”

Jiang agreed to meet Witke, remarking that “a politician cannot have a secure position at home without the support of international opinion.” According to multiple sources, including Zhang Ying, the main translator during the meeting who later published a memoir chronicling the meeting, Yang Yinlu, Jiang's secretary, and other CCP official documents, Jiang advised Witke should be her biographer, hoping to replicate what Edgar Snow had done in helping establish Mao Zedong’s international reputation in the early twentieth century. However, in 2010 the historian Ding Kaiwen contacted Witke to verify the detail. Witke stated that Jiang had never asked her to write a biography, and Ding concluded that the claim likely originated from the Chinese government’s smear campaign against Jiang after the Gang of Four's fall to exaggerate her ambition.

After Witke returned to the United States, Jiang instructed aides to transcribe and edit their recorded conversations. Zhou Enlai, Zhang Chunqiao, and Yao Wenyuan reviewed parts of the draft; Zhou read and amended the first section. Zhou later convened several meetings with officials from the Ministry of Foreign Affairs and the CPAFFC to discuss whether to deliver the edited manuscript to Witke and, with Mao Zedong’s instructions, all recordings and transcripts were sealed. Through diplomatic channels, China’s ambassador to the United Nations, Huang Hua, and his wife, He Liliang, pressured Witke not to publish the biography, reneging on their earlier promise to provide the transcripts and translations of their meeting and instead offering to purchase the copyright. Witke declined and began her own research for publication. In June 1973, Witke went to Paris to meet Jiang’s former husband Tang Na for her biography, but he refused to cooperate on the project.

Witke’s interview was believed to have inspired The Red Empress (红都女皇), a purported biography of Jiang published in Hong Kong in 1973—or the rumor of it, as the very existence of the book remains disputed. The Red Empress was said to be disrespectful to Mao and filled with “vulgar” depictions of Jiang’s past as an actress in Shanghai, which in turn fueled a rumor campaign that threatened her political standing, likely as part of a broader power struggle. At the time, The Red Empress was commonly believed to be the Chinese version of Witke’s biography, which, in fact, had yet to be published.

According to Witke’s own surmise, in his struggle against Jiang, Zhou Enlai deliberately took advantage of Jiang’s love of publicity by arranging for Witke to interview her, assigning his confidante Zhang Ying as the translator. Zhou then allegedly instructed Zhang to use the recordings as the basis for The Red Empress, which was said to have been published anonymously in Hong Kong. Zhou, Witke speculated, presented the book to Mao as evidence of Jiang’s misconduct, enraging him and contributing to the rift between Mao and Jiang.

Zhang dismissed the conspiracy theory, recalling that by late 1973, while in Canada, she had already “heard that a book had come out in Hong Kong, apparently written by a Chinese, praising Jiang Qing and saying she wanted to become empress.” Upon returning to China in late 1974, she attempted to investigate the rumor and found that parts of the book indeed matched the content of Jiang's recorded conversations with Witke. Around the same time, transcripts of Jiang’s remarks on Dream of the Red Chamber—a novel banned during the Cultural Revolution but admired by Jiang during her interview with Witke—were also circulating, suggesting that confidential interview materials held by the Foreign Ministry had already leaked.

Comrade Chiang Ch’ing was published in 1977 by Little, Brown and Company in the United States. The book was later translated into French, German, Spanish, Italian, Japanese, and other languages. An unauthorized Chinese edition appeared in Hong Kong in 2006 under the title The Red Empress (红都女皇), appropriating the title and notoriety of the rumored risqué 1970s biography.

By the time Witke’s book was released, Jiang had fallen along with the Gang of Four. Among the Communist Part's official charges against her was that she “defied Premier Zhou’s instructions and secretly held seven meetings with Witke totaling sixty hours, during which she distorted history, glorified herself, slandered Mao Zedong, attacked Zhou Enlai and other leaders, and leaked classified state and military information in collaboration with foreign powers in pursuit of personal ambition.”

Jiang committed suicide in Beijing on 14 May 1991. Later that year, Witke published a long article, “The Last Days of Madame Mao,” in the December 1991 issue of Vanity Fair.

She served as a director of the Japanese Art Society of America around 2013.

== Personal life ==
In 1965, while studying at the University of California, Berkeley, Witke was a student of literary scholar Tsi-an Hsia (夏济安), brother of C.T. Hsia. According to historian Tong Tekong, Hsia developed romantic feelings for her, but she declined his advances, leading him to suffer a cerebral hemorrhage and died a few days later.

Witke married Frederick A. Siegler in 1960, and Andrew J. Nathan in 1979. Both marriages ended in divorce. Then, her partner for many years was another China history scholar Charlton M. Lewis III until his death in 2023.

== Publications ==
=== Books ===
- Witke, Roxane Heater (1970 [c. 1971]). Transformations of Attitudes Towards Women During the May Fourth Era of Modern China. [Berkeley : s.n.]. v, 80 leaves. — Doctoral thesis, University of California, Berkeley. Includes bibliographies. Reproduced as microfilm (Ann Arbor, Mich.: University Microfilms, 1975).
- Comrade Chiang Ch'ing (Little, Brown & Co., 1977, ISBN ISBN 0-316-94900-0; ISBN ISBN 978-0-316-94900-2), 549 pp. Illustrated with photographs. First edition. Author: Roxane Witke. — Biography of Jiang, the wife of Mao Zedong.
- Wolf, Margery; Witke, Roxane; and Martin, Emily (1975). Women in Chinese Society. Stanford University Press. 315 pp. ISBN ISBN 0-8047-0874-6; ISBN 978-0-8047-0874-6. — A scholarly collection of essays on the changing roles, status, and lives of Chinese women in the twentieth century, covering both mainland China and Taiwan.

=== Articles and chapters ===
- Witke, Roxane (July 1967). "Mao Tse-tung, Women and Suicide in the May Fourth Era". The China Quarterly. 31: 128–147. doi:10.1017/S0305741000028733.
- Witke, Roxane (March 21, 1977). "Special Section: Comrade Chiang Ch'ing Tells Her Story". Time. Vol. 109, no. 12. — A profile and extended interview with Jiang (Madame Mao), recounting her early life, personal reflections, and self-presentation during the late Cultural Revolution period.
- Witke, Roxane (December 1991). "The Last Days of Madame Mao". Vanity Fair.
