= Shajiabang (opera) =

Opera first produced during the Cultural Revolution (1958)

- Chinese: 沙家浜
Transcriptions
Standard Mandarin
- Hanyu Pinyin: Shājiābāng
- Wade–Giles: Sha^{1}-chia^{1}-pang^{1}
- IPA: [ʂá.tɕjá.páŋ]

Sparks amid the Reeds
- Traditional Chinese: 蘆蕩火種
- Simplified Chinese: 芦荡火种
Transcriptions
Standard Mandarin
- Hanyu Pinyin: Lúdàng Huǒzhòng

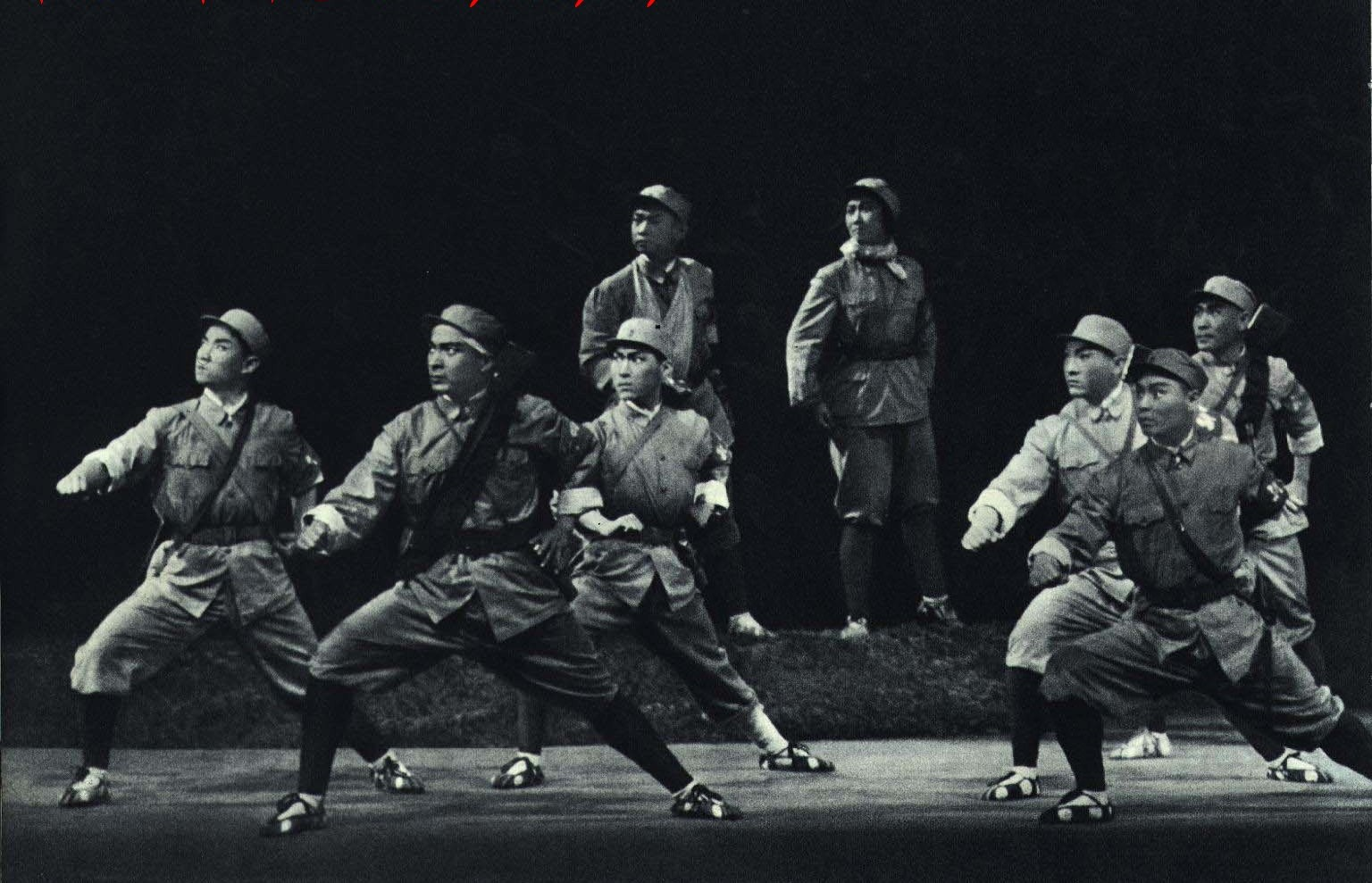
Image from a 1967 performance of Shajiapang

Shajiabang (Chinese: 沙家浜, also Shachiapang), first produced under the title Sparks Amid the Reeds, is a Chinese revolutionary opera and one of the "model plays" endorsed by Jiang Qing during the Cultural Revolution.

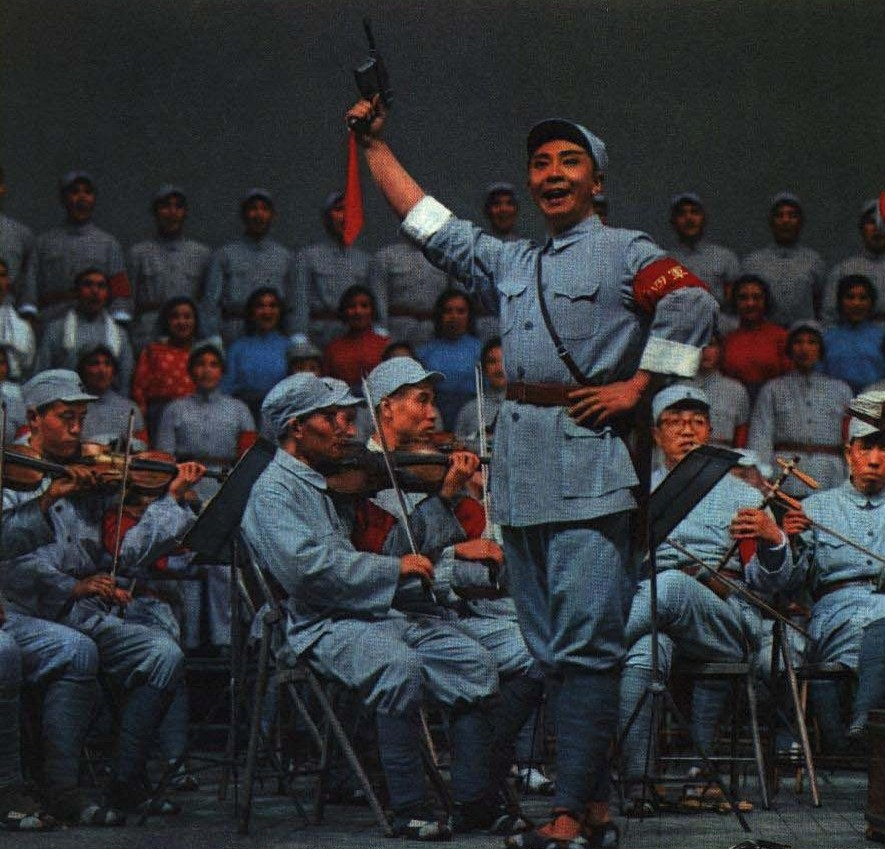
Red Army commissar Guo Jianguang gestures with a Mauser C96; orchestra behind him.

== Production ==
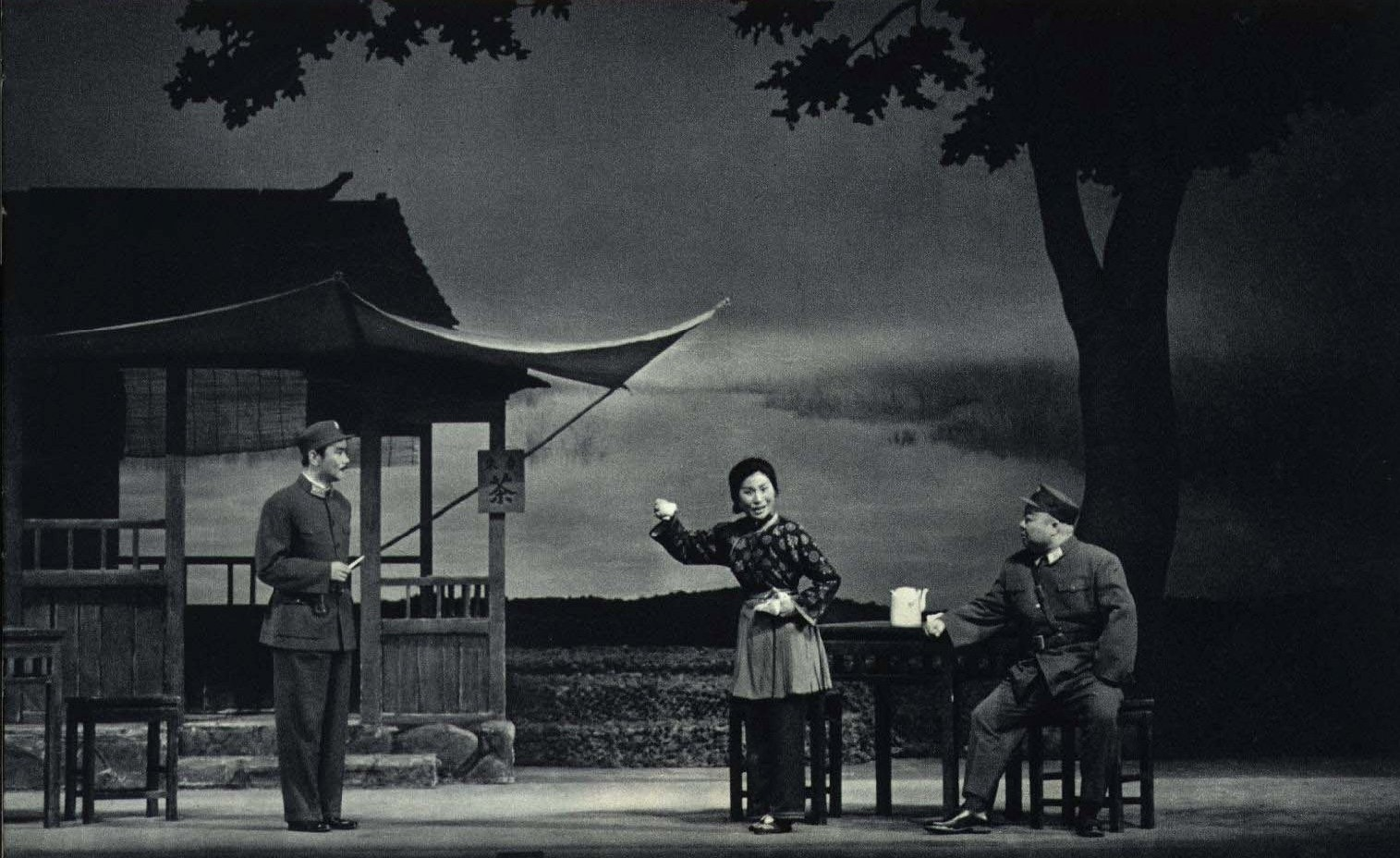
Image from China Pictorial (1967): Sister Aqing hosts two collaborationist officers at her teahouse.

It was first produced as a Shanghai opera entitled Sparks amid the Reeds (芦荡火种) or Emerald Water and Red Flags in 1958 by the Hu Opera Troupe. In October 1963, the First Peking Opera Company adapted it as a Peking opera. Mao Zedong saw it in 1964 and asked that the title be changed, as sparks would not set wet reeds alight, so it was named after its setting, the town of Shajiabang ("sands family creek"). Jiang Qing (Mao's wife, a leading figure in the Cultural Revolution), insisted that the role of the Red Army political commissar be expanded. The dance routines were also revised, the opera not reaching its final form until 1970. Wang Zengqi also contributed to it.

== Synopsis ==
Set during the Second Sino-Japanese War ("War of Resistance", early 1940s) in Japanese-ruled territory west of Shanghai. Shajiabang is a town by Yangcheng Lake. Sister Aqing runs a teahouse visited by officers of a Chinese collaborationist group; unbeknownst to them, she is a member of the Chinese Communist Party, and is helping wounded soldiers of the New Fourth Army who are hiding in the marshes.

== Legacy ==
Shajiabang was made into a film in 1971 by the Changchun Film Studio, and the score has also been performed as a "revolutionary symphony."

An exhibition hall of Shajiabang's revolutionary history was opened in 1988, and expanded in 2006.

A television re-make of Shajiabang aired for 30 episodes beginning in 2006.
