= With you in charge, I'm at ease =

Phrase written by Mao Zedong

A poster featuring Mao Zedong, Hua Guofeng, and the phrase "With you in charge, I'm at ease" in Chinese characters

"With you in charge, I'm at ease" (simplified Chinese: 你办事，我放心; traditional Chinese: 你辦事，我放心) is a phrase reportedly written by Chairman Mao Zedong of the Chinese Communist Party (CCP) on a note before his death. The statement provided a significant basis of legitimacy for Hua Guofeng to succeed as the top leader. Its authenticity has been widely debated, and the phrase played a central role in the political struggles that followed Mao's death.

== The notes ==
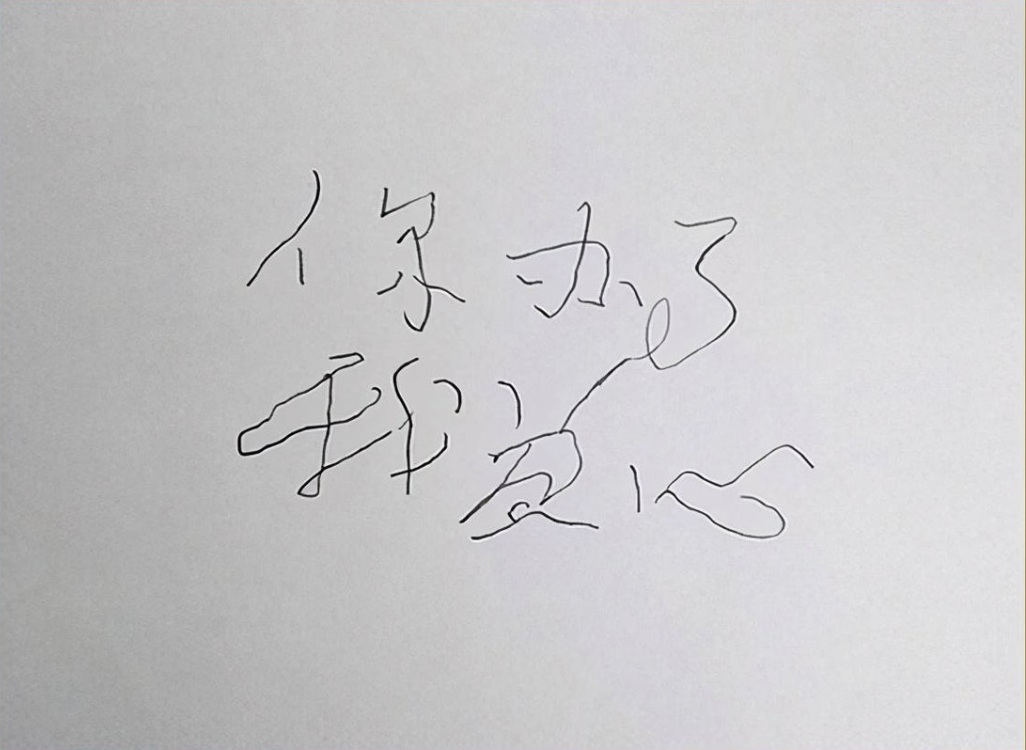
The note, which reads "With you in charge, I'm at ease", supposedly by Mao Zedong on 30 April 1976

On 30 April 1976, Mao Zedong met with New Zealand Prime Minister Robert Muldoon during his visit to China. Hua Guofeng, then the First Vice Chairman of the CCP and Premier of China, accompanied Mao during the meeting. Following Muldoon's departure, Mao discussed domestic matters with Hua; due to Mao's declining health and difficulty speaking, he often communicated through writing. There, Mao wrote three notes to Hua:

1. "Act in line with the past principle." (Note: Chinese: 照过去方针办)
2. "Take your time, don't be anxious." (Note: Chinese: 慢慢来，不要招急)
3. "With you in charge, I'm at ease." (Note: Chinese: 你办事，我放心)

Zhang Hanzhi recounted that Hua Guofeng shared Mao Zedong's notes with Qiao Guanhua, the Chinese foreign minister and Zhang's husband. When Qiao inquired about the meaning of Mao's statement, "With you in charge, I'm at ease," Hua interpreted it as Mao's directive to intervene in the ongoing criticism of Deng Xiaoping in Sichuan and Guizhou. Hua further explained that Mao had entrusted him with this responsibility to intensify the critique. Subsequently, Qiao conveyed the contents of the notes to Zhang. Zhang expressed concern about the possibility of the notes being misinterpreted or manipulated in the future. However, Qiao dismissed this apprehension, asserting that Hua's integrity and moral character would likely prevent any distortion of their original meaning.

== Impact ==
=== Succession of leadership ===
These notes, especially the third, were later cited as evidence of Mao's endorsement of Hua as his successor. On 9 September, Mao Zedong passed away. Intense political struggles erupted within the CCP. On 6 October, Hua Guofeng and his allies arrested Jiang Qing, Zhang Chunqiao, Yao Wenyuan and their allies within an hour. The Politburo announced that Hua would be the new party and military chief. On 24 October, grand celebrations were held across China to commemorate Hua Guofeng's succession and the defeat of the Gang of Four. At a mass rally in Beijing, Hua ascended Tiananmen for the first time as the nation's supreme leader, receiving cheers from the crowd chanting, "At ease, at ease, at ease..." During the rally, Wu De, then Director of the Beijing Revolutionary Committee, declared in his speech, "Our great leader Chairman Mao personally wrote to Comrade Hua Guofeng, 'With you in charge, I'm at ease,' expressing Chairman Mao's boundless trust in Comrade Hua." This announcement was seen as a formal endorsement of Hua's succession and legitimisation of his leadership.

=== Personality cult ===
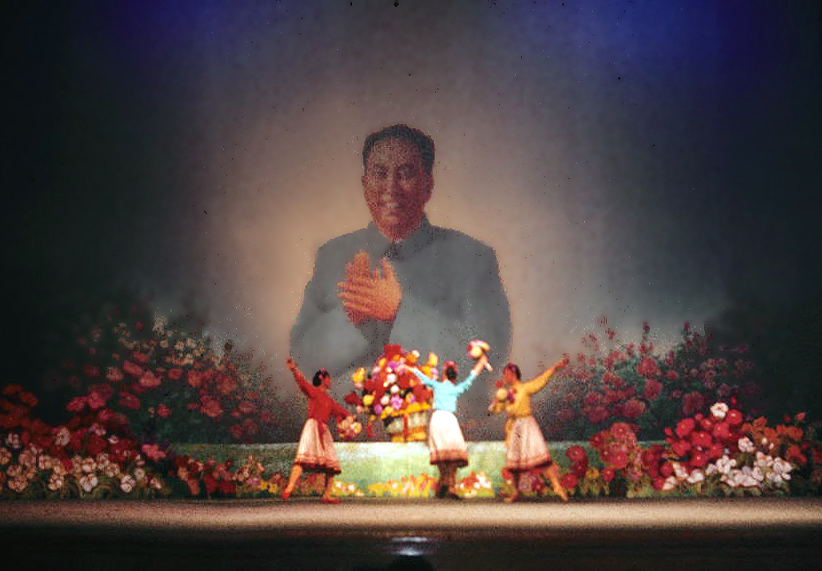
Performance of ballet "With flowers to Chairman Hua"

Local governments across China sent telegrams expressing "full support" for Hua Guofeng. On 29 October, Jiefang Daily published Comrade Hua Guofeng Is the Undisputed Leader of Our Party, an editorial widely reprinted in newspapers across the country and the subject of study groups organized nationwide. The official rhetoric unified around the phrase: "Chairman Mao had boundless trust in Chairman Hua, and the people of the entire nation wholeheartedly support Chairman Hua." Hua was credited with having "the courage of a proletarian revolutionary" in decisively crushing the Gang of Four, and was lauded for announcing the establishment of the Chairman Mao Memorial Hall, the publication of the fifth volume of the Selected Works of Mao Zedong, and the preparation for the publication of The Collected Works of Mao Zedong. He was hailed as "Mao Zedong's good student and successor," "the brilliant leader of our Party and people," and "the wise commander of our army."

During the first year of Hua's leadership, almost every newspaper headline featured Mao Zedong's phrase "With you in charge, I'm at ease" in bold type. People across the country expressed their support for Hua in various forms, including the famous poem Chairman Mao Is at Ease, We Are at Ease, written by "Hu Gong," and the well-known oil painting With You in Charge, I'm at Ease by renowned artist Li Yansheng. The painting, which depicts Mao and Hua having an intimate conversation on sofa chairs, was printed in the tens of millions in 1977, and many households displayed it.

== Controversy ==
The authenticity of this statement has been widely questioned. When Hua Guofeng succeeded Mao, it was noted that Qiao Guanhua had mentioned that Hua only produced two other notes during a Politburo meeting, leading to doubts. Qiao was later accused of "resisting Chairman Mao's final instructions, opposing Hua Guofeng as Mao's successor, and colluding with the 'Gang of Four' to usurp power," and was isolated and investigated in his later years. Zhang Chunqiao has since claimed that the statement never existed. Meanwhile, Mao's wife Jiang Qing, when she was tried on 3 December 1980, acknowledged the statement's existence but claimed the full version was "你办事，我放心; 有问题，找江青" ("With you in charge, I'm at ease; if there's a problem, ask Jiang Qing.")

Additionally, according to Mao's secretary Zhang Yufeng, in early May 1976, Hua Guofeng reported to Mao that he was "feeling overwhelmed" as disagreements during Politburo meetings made it difficult to reach a consensus, and even a decision on importing 50,000 tons of sugar was delayed for a month. Mao allegedly advised him, "Take your time, don't be anxious." This remark was recorded by Wang Dongxing. After the fall of the Gang of Four, Wang sought to "verify" the matter with Zhang Yufeng, urging her to recall this as a political test, and presented a note supposedly written by Mao for confirmation. However, Zhang later confirmed in her recollections that, after 10 April 1976, Mao had not written anything by hand.
