= Jiang Qing =

Fourth wife of Mao Zedong (1914–1991)

Jiang Qing Chiang Ching
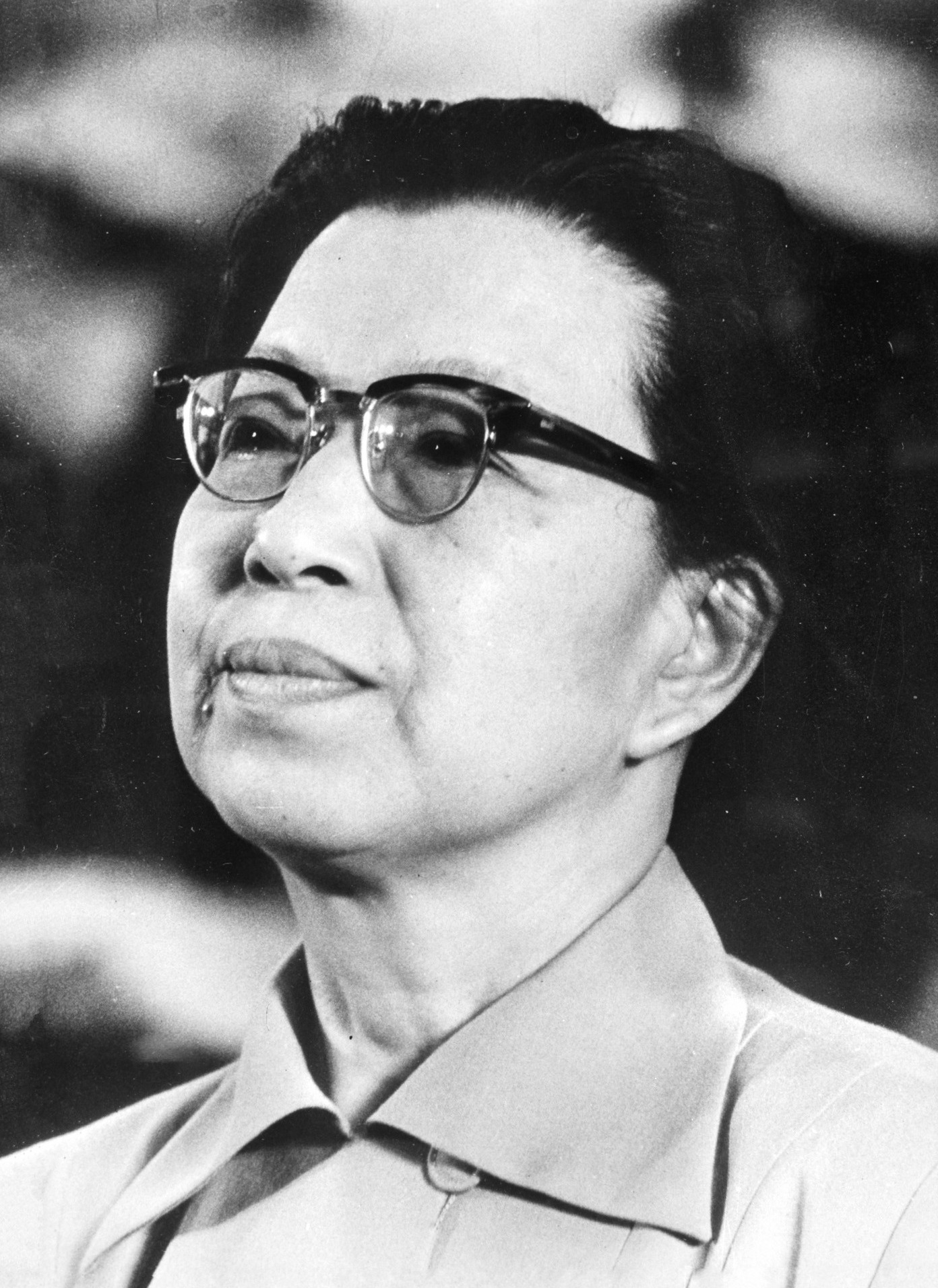
- Jiang in 1976

First Deputy Chair of the Cultural Revolution Group
- In office 28 May 1966 – 24 April 1969
- Leader: Chen Boda
- Preceded by: Group established
- Succeeded by: Group abolished

First Lady of China
- In office 1 October 1949 – 9 September 1976
- Leader: Mao Zedong
- Succeeded by: Han Zhijun

Spouse of the Chairman of China
- In office 27 September 1954 – 27 April 1959
- President: Mao Zedong
- Succeeded by: Wang Guangmei

Personal details
- Born: Li Shumeng or Li Jinhai; March 1914 Zhucheng, Shandong, China
- Died: 14 May 1991 (aged 77) Beijing, China
- Cause of death: Suicide by hanging
- Party: Chinese Communist Party (expelled 21 July 1977)
- Spouses: Pei Minglun (m. 1931; div. 1931) Tang Na (m. 1936; div. 1937) Mao Zedong (m. 1938; died 1976)
- Children: Li Na
- Relatives: Mao family (by marriage)
- Criminal penalty: Death sentence with reprieve, later commuted to life imprisonment
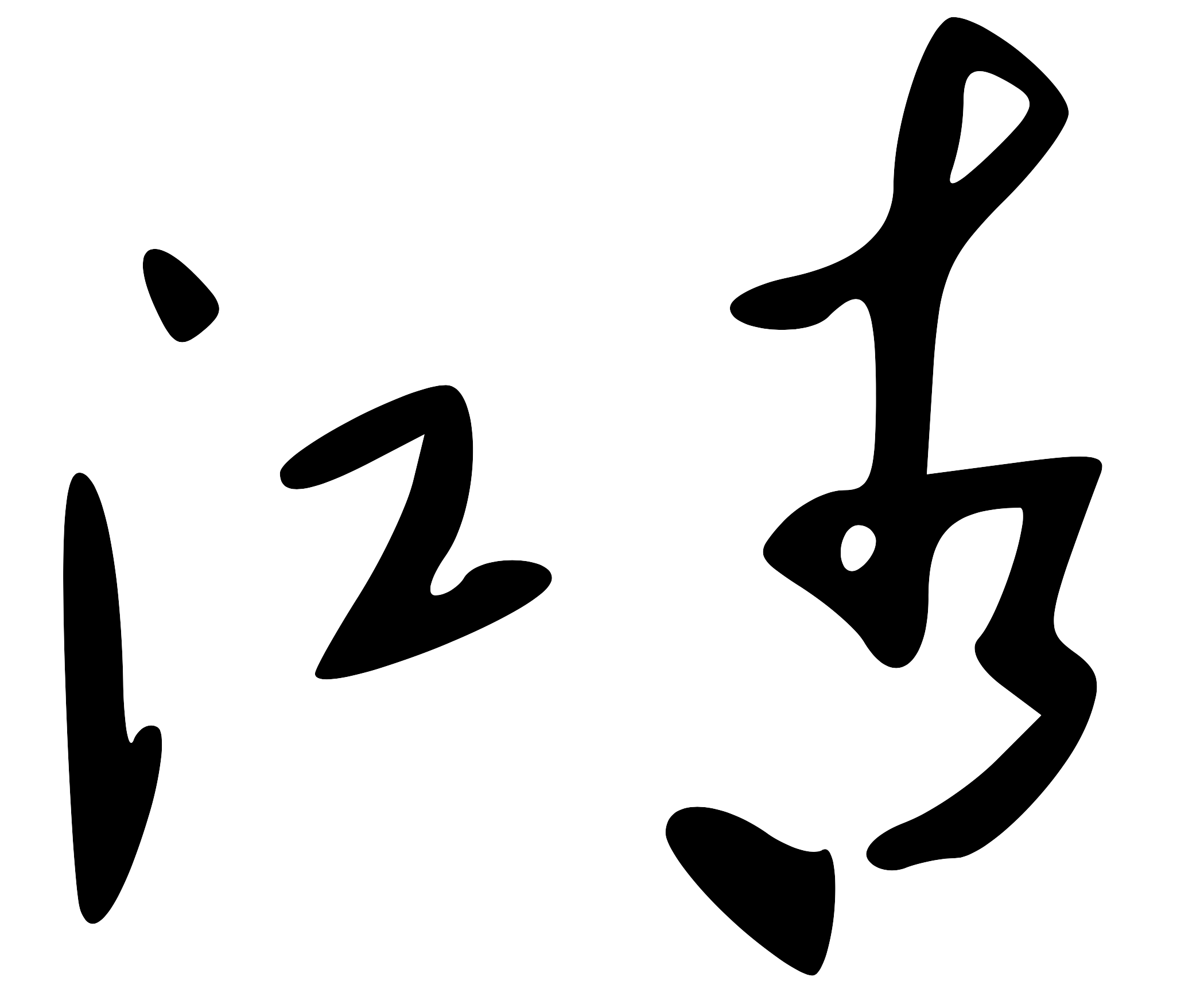
- Signature

Chinese name
- Chinese: 江青
Transcriptions
Standard Mandarin
- Hanyu Pinyin: Jiāng Qīng
- Wade–Giles: Chiang^{1} Ch'ing^{1}
- IPA: [tɕjáŋ tɕʰíŋ]

Jiang Qing (Note: Chinese: 江青; pinyin: Jiāng Qīng; Wade–Giles: Chiang¹ Ch'ing¹) (Note: Jiang Qing is her most commonly used name, but she had various names in her life as well as Madam Mao. Please read Names section for details.) (March 1914 – 14 May 1991; also spelled as Chiang Ch'ing) was a Chinese revolutionary, actress, and political figure. The fourth wife of Mao Zedong, she played a major role in the Cultural Revolution and led the Gang of Four.

Born to an abusive father and a mother who worked as a domestic servant and sometimes a prostitute, Jiang joined the Chinese Communist Party (CCP) in 1933. She pursued an acting career in Shanghai before going to Yan'an, where she married Mao in 1938. After the founding of the People's Republic of China in 1949, despite maintaining a low profile throughout the 1950s, she wielded considerable influence over the arts while engaging in party power struggles beginning in the early 1960s, orchestrating campaigns against the film The Life of Wu Xun and the Peking opera Hai Rui Dismissed from Office, and promoting revolutionary operas.

Jiang reached the height of her power in the late 1960s, having consolidated and led the radical Gang of Four. A Politburo member at the Ninth and Tenth Central Committees and de facto leader of the Cultural Revolution Group, she was arrested following Mao's death and expelled from the party. Blamed for the upheavals of the Cultural Revolution, she was sentenced to death with a two-year reprieve in a televised trial, before her sentence was commuted to life imprisonment. She committed suicide in May 1991.

== Names ==
=== Chinese names ===
Jiang was known by various names throughout her life, as well as Madam Mao. Before her birth, her father named the baby Li Jinnan, (Note: simplified Chinese: 李进男; traditional Chinese: 李進男; pinyin: Lǐ Jìnnán; Wade–Giles: li³ chin⁴ nan²) where Jinnan means the "coming boy." When she was born, her father changed the name to Li Jinhai, (Note: simplified Chinese: 李进孩; traditional Chinese: 李進孩; pinyin: Lǐ Jìnhái; Wade–Giles: li³ chin⁴ hai²) meaning the "coming child." Therefore, Jiang also called herself Li Jin. (Note: simplified Chinese: 李进; traditional Chinese: 李進; pinyin: Lǐ Jìn; Wade–Giles: li³ chin⁴) Several other sources indicate her birth name Li Shumeng, (Note: Chinese: 李淑蒙; pinyin: Lǐ Shúméng; Wade–Giles: li³ shu² mêng²) which means "pure and simple."

She adopted the name Li Yunhe (Note: simplified Chinese: 李云鹤; traditional Chinese: 李雲鶴; pinyin: Lǐ Yúnhè; Wade–Giles: li³ yün² hê⁴) during primary school. She told her biographer Roxane Witke that she liked the name because "Yunhe," meaning "crane in the cloud," sounded beautiful. In July 1933, during her first visit to Shanghai, she assumed the name Li He (Note: simplified Chinese: 李鹤; traditional Chinese: 李鶴; pinyin: Lǐ Hè; Wade–Giles: li³ hê⁴) and worked as a teacher for local workers. On her second visit to Shanghai in June 1934, she used the alias Zhang Shuzhen. (Note: simplified Chinese: 张淑贞; traditional Chinese: 張淑貞; pinyin: Zhāng Shúzhēn; Wade–Giles: chang shu² chên) Later, when detained by the Nationalist government in October 1934, she identified herself as Li Yungu. (Note: simplified Chinese: 李云古; traditional Chinese: 李雲古; pinyin: Lǐ Yúngǔ; Wade–Giles: li³ yün² ku³)

In 1935, when she entered the entertainment industry, she took on the stage name Lan Ping, (Note: simplified Chinese: 蓝苹; traditional Chinese: 藍蘋; pinyin: Lán Píng; Wade–Giles: lan² ping²) which means "blue apple". Although the name had no particular meaning, its bluntness made it unique. However, Jiang did not favour this name due to its association with her scandals in Shanghai. She became known as Jiang upon arriving in Yan'an, where Jiang means river and Qing means azure or "better than blue".

In 1991, when she was hospitalised in Beijing, she used the name Li Runqing. (Note: simplified Chinese: 李润青; traditional Chinese: 李潤青; pinyin: Lǐ Rùnqīng; Wade–Giles: li³ jun⁴ ch'ing) When she died in Beijing, her body was labelled with the pseudonym Li Zi. (Note: Chinese: 李梓; pinyin: Lǐ Zǐ; Wade–Giles: li³ tzu³) In March 2002, she was buried in Beijing by her school name Li Yunhe.

=== English names ===
In English, many contemporary articles used the Wade–Giles romanisation system to spell Chinese names. For this reason, some sources – especially older ones – spell her name "Chiang Ch'ing", while newer sources use Pinyin and spell her name "Jiang Qing". She was also known as Madame Mao. In accordance with Chinese customs in which women retain their maiden names after marriage, her surname remained unchanged in Chinese.

== Early life ==
Jiang was born in Zhucheng, Shandong, in March 1914. She deliberately kept her exact birth date private to avoid receiving any gifts. Her father was Li Dewen, (Note: Chinese: 李德文; pinyin: Lǐ Déwén; Wade–Giles: li³ tê² wên²) a carpenter, and her mother, whose name is unknown, was Li's subsidiary wife, or concubine. Her father had his own carpentry and cabinet making workshop. Her parents were married after her father initially found his first wife unable to conceive.

As a child, Jiang was deeply traumatised by the domestic violence inflicted by her father, who verbally and physically abused her mother almost every day. One Lantern Festival, after her father broke her mother's finger during an attack, her mother fled with Jiang under the cover of darkness. Her mother found work as a domestic servant that often blurred the lines with prostitution, and her husband separated from her.

Jiang eventually moved with her mother to her grandparents' home in Jinan. However, they soon returned to Zhucheng, as her mother continued to seek inheritance rights, or financial support, from her husband's family, which proved extremely difficult. During this period, Jiang attended two primary schools with disruptions, where she was often mocked for wearing outdated, boyish clothing from her brothers. She became silent and not easy to open up.

Her mother, having fallen ill, eventually abandoned hope of obtaining further financial support from her husband. After selling some of her belongings, she purchased a train ticket, and together with Jiang, boarded a train from Jiaoxian to Jinan. There, Jiang was welcomed by her grandparents and resumed her primary education. In 1926–1927, her mother took her further north to Tianjin to stay with her half-sister. During this time, Jiang worked as a housekeeper in the household. She proposed taking a job rolling cigarettes, but the family disapproved. Later they returned to Jinan, where her mother died in 1928.

== Entertainment career ==
=== Jinan ===
At 14, Jiang, now an orphan, joined a local underground theatre troupe, seeking independence. Her striking looks drew attention, but she remained sensitive about her poor upbringing. Alarmed by her undisclosed departure, her grandparents paid the troupe's boss to bring her back. She enrolled in the Experimental Arts Academy, which became less picky about the social class of new entrants due to the May Fourth Movement. Despite her strong Shandong accent initially hindering her performances, she excelled during her year of training, in some traditional opera roles. When the academy closed in 1930, Jiang, though only half-trained, was chosen to join theatrical companies in Beijing. She returned to Jinan in May 1931 and married Pei Minglun, (Note: simplified Chinese: 裴明伦; traditional Chinese: 裴明倫; pinyin: Péi Mínglún; Wade–Giles: p'ei² ming² lun²; According to the Revised Mandarin Chinese Dictionary by the Taiwanese Ministry of Education, the surname is pronounced Péi. However, Hong Kong's Multi-function Chinese Character Database notes an additional pronunciation as Féi. Terrill 1999 (pp. 29–31) adopts the translation Fei.) the wealthy son of a businessman, and soon divorced.

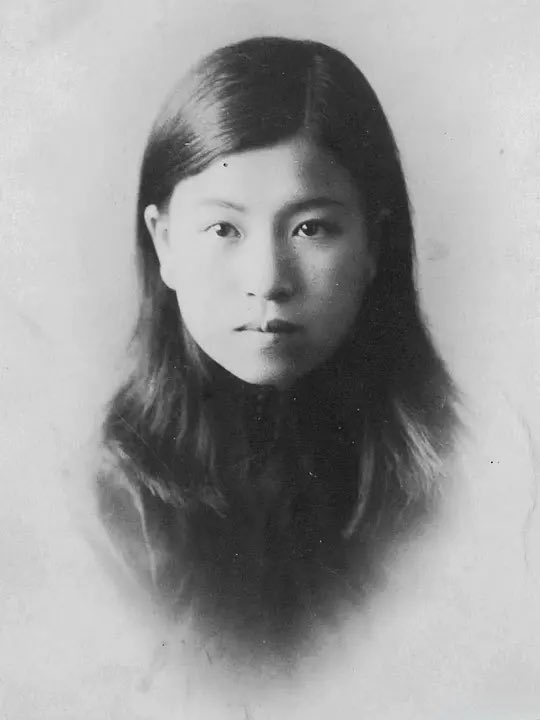
Jiang in Qingdao in 1931

=== Qingdao ===
Following her divorce, Jiang reached out to Zhao Taimou, the former director of the Arts Academy and dean of Qingdao University. (Note: Some sources claim that Jiang Qing went to Shandong University while Zhao Taimou was its president, but this is not entirely true. Jiang Qing arrived at the Qingdao University in 1931, when Yang Zhensheng was the president. In early 1932, Yang resigned. The university was renamed Shandong University and Zhao was appointed president.) With the assistance of Zhao's wife, Yu Shan, Jiang secured a position as a clerk in the university library. Yu Shan later introduced Jiang to her brother, Yu Qiwei, an upper-class youth who had embraced the Communist cause and was connected to underground Communist organisations as well as literary and performing arts circles.

The Mukden Incident in September ignited her patriotism, leading her to develop a dislike for the Kuomintang and its supporters. By the end of 1932, Jiang and Yu Qiwei fell in love and began living together, enabling Jiang to gain entry into the Communist Cultural Front. She became a member of the Seaside Drama Society, performing in plays such as Lay Down Your Whip, harnessing the influence of theatre to resist Japanese aggression. In February 1933, she officially joined the CCP.

The Communist activities at Qingdao University, which was later renamed Shandong University, attracted significant attention from the Kuomintang's secret police, who arrested Yu Qiwei in July, forcing Jiang to leave Qingdao.

=== Shanghai ===
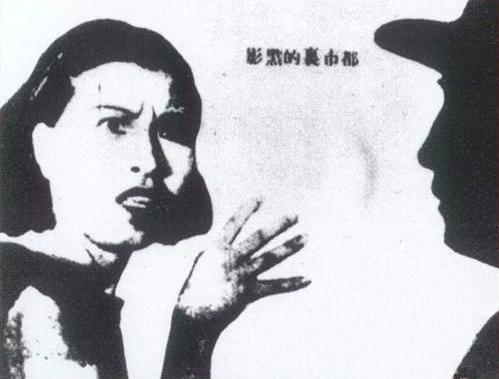
Jiang in a 1935 film poster

After the arrest of Yu Qiwei, Yu Shan arranged for Jiang to move to Shanghai. With a recommendation from Tian Han's younger brother, Tian Luan, she enrolled as a visiting student at the Great China University in Shanghai. In July, with endorsements from Tian Han and his associates, Jiang became a teacher at the Chengeng Workers' School, an institution organised by Tao Xingzhi. During this time, Yu Qiwei was released and visited her in Shanghai. In October, Jiang re-joined the Chinese Communist Youth League, became a member of the League of Left-Wing Educators, and resumed her career as a drama actress.

She performed in the Shanghai Work Study Troupe. Jiang was among the cast of a production of Roar, China! which British authorities banned from being performed in Shanghai's International Settlement.

In September 1934, Jiang was arrested and jailed for her political activities in Shanghai. During her arrest in Shanghai, Jiang was interrogated by a Zhongtong agent named Zhao Yaoshan. Jiang had once revealed to Zhao that Tan Xiaoqing was a CCP member, leading to Tan's arrest. She was released three months later, in December. She then traveled to Beijing where she reunited with Yu Qiwei, who had just been released following his prison sentence, and the two began living together again.

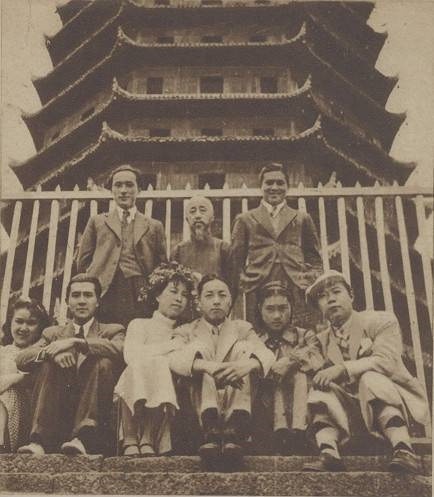
Collective wedding in Hangzhou (Jiang is the third woman from the left)

She returned to Shanghai in March 1935, and entered Diantong Film Company. She became famous when featuring in Ibsen's play A Doll's House as Nora. She later became an actress in Goddess of Freedom and Scenes of City Life, during which she fell in love with Tang Na, her colleague at Diantong. The two began living together in September 1935. Jiang nevertheless left him for Tianjin to meet Yu Qiwei, telling Tang that her late mother "had fallen ill in Jinan." When Tang discovered the truth, he attempted suicide in Jinan but later reconciled with Jiang and returned with her to Shanghai in July 1935. Later they were married in a collective wedding ceremony at Liuhe Pagoda in Hangzhou in April 1936.

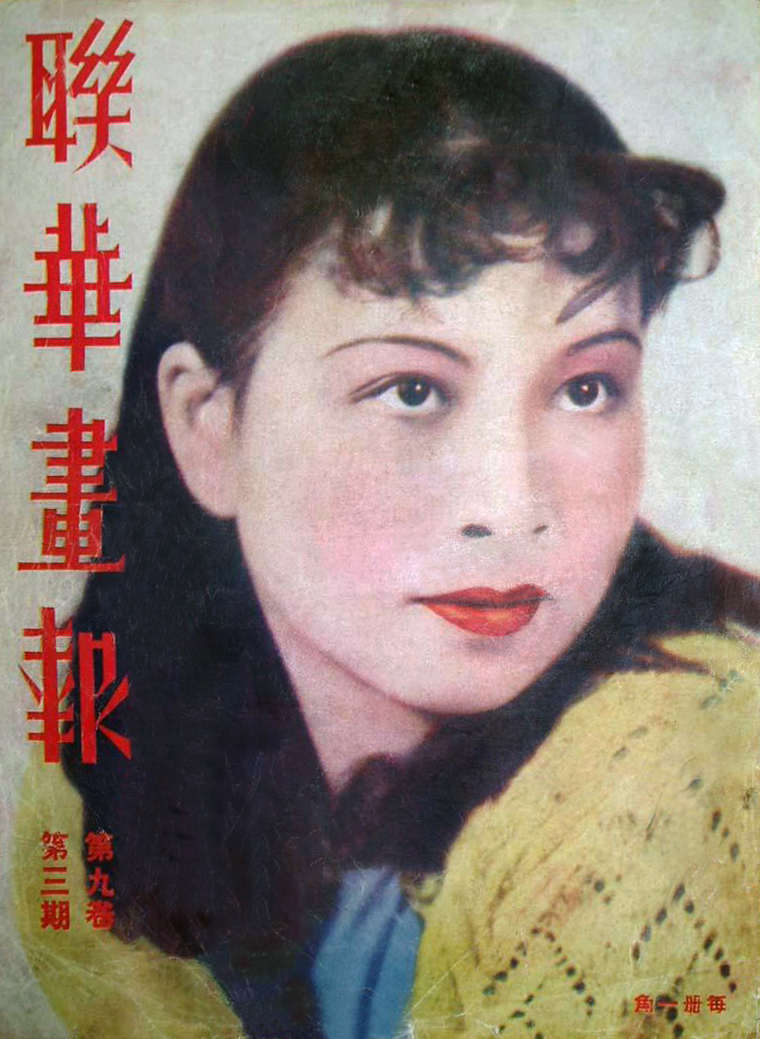
Jiang on the cover of a film magazine

In Shanghai, Jiang joined Lianhua Film Company, where she acted in Blood on Wolf Mountain and Lianhua Symphony. During this period, she began an affair with film director Zhang Min, appeared in his production The Storm. She also became an actress in Wang Laowu. However, during the second performance of The Storm in May 1937, Tang attempted suicide again. Following this incident, Jiang divorced Tang and started living with Zhang Min, but the relationship cost her career as she was dismissed by Lianhua Film Company.

Jiang's widely publicised affair with Tang Na tarnished her reputation, making it difficult for her to continue her acting career in Shanghai. Like many youths of her time, she was drawn to the progressive ideals associated with Yan'an. The Marco Polo Bridge Incident in July 1937, which marked the start of Japan's full-scale invasion of China, further galvanised young activists to advocate for a united front. Yan'an, promoted through Communist propaganda, emerged as a symbol of democracy, freedom, and hope. She left Shanghai for Yan'an in July, after which the Japanese invasion in Shanghai started on 13 August.

Selected films featuring Jiang in the 1930s
Year	English title	Original title	Role	Notes
1935	Goddess of Freedom	自由神	Yu Yueying	
1935	Scenes of City Life	都市风光	Wang Junsheng's girlfriend	
1936	Blood on Wolf Mountain	狼山喋血记	Liu Sansao	
1937	Lianhua Symphony	联华交响曲	Rickshaw puller's wife	Segment 1: "Twenty Cents"
1938	Wang Laowu	王老五	Young Girl Li	Filmed in 1937. Leading actress

== Early political activities ==
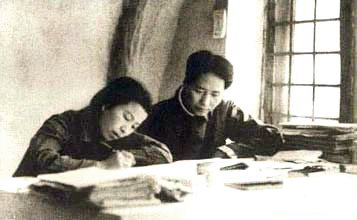
Mao and Jiang writing together in Yan'an, 1938

=== Yan'an ===
==== Drama teacher ====
Jiang went first to Xi'an, then to Yan'an. In November, she enrolled in the Counter-Japanese Military and Political University for study. The Lu Xun Academy of Arts was newly founded in Yan'an on 10 April 1938, and Jiang became a drama department instructor, teaching and performing in college plays and operas. The conditions in Yan'an were harsh, but Jiang was able to make it there and persist. Jiang was striking in appearance and had several talents; she could sing opera, write well, and her calligraphy was particularly impressive, especially in regular script. On one hand, she was relatively quiet and reserved—she didn't enjoy shooting, but liked playing poker, knitting, and was skilled at creating various patterns. She was also adept at tailoring and made her own clothes beautifully. On the other hand, she had a lively and bold side—Jiang enjoyed horseback riding, especially taming wild horses; the more ferocious the horse, the more she liked to ride it. This combination of traits allowed her to excel as both a homemaker and adapt to the tough, military lifestyle, earning the admiration of revolutionary leaders.

==== Secret marriage ====
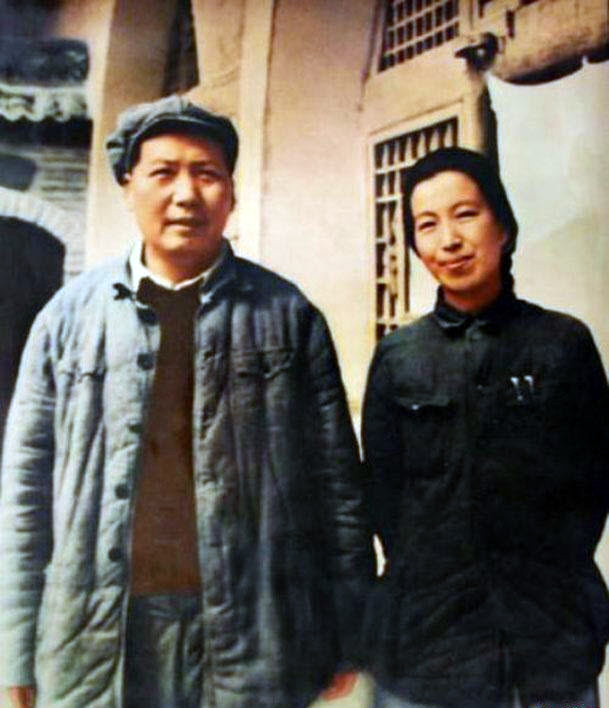
Mao and Jiang in 1946

In the autumn of 1937, He Zizhen, the wife of Mao, left Yan'an. When news of Jiang's romance with Mao broke, it sparked significant opposition. The most vocal critic was Zhang Wentian, who believed that He Zizhen, as an outstanding CCP member, having endured the Long March and sustained multiple injuries, deserved respect. However, some felt that Mao's personal matters, including his choice of a wife, were his own business, and others should not interfere. Among those who supported Mao, the most vocal was Kang Sheng.

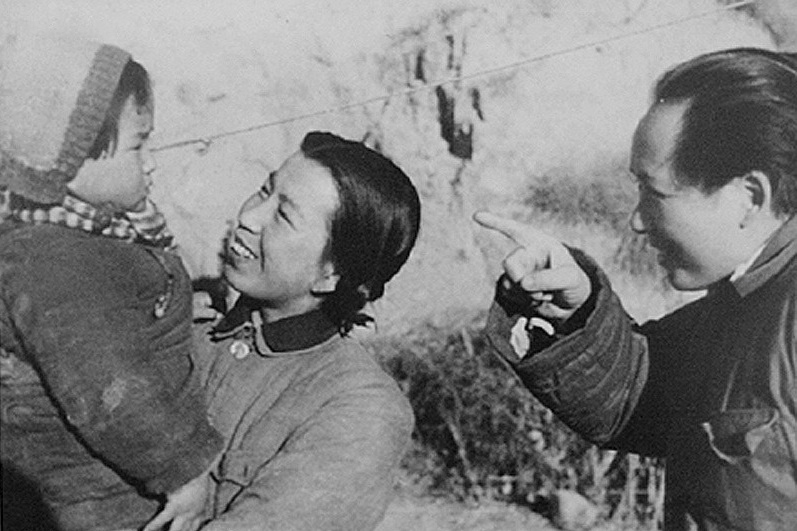
Li Na, Jiang and Mao in Yan'an in 1943

Figures like Zhou Enlai and Liu Shaoqi, however, were more cautious in their support of Jiang. They sent telegrams to the Communist leadership in Shanghai, requesting them to clarify Jiang's conduct in Shanghai, where she was suspected of being a "secret agent" of the Kuomintang. Yang Fan, a party leader in Shanghai, secretly wrote to Yan'an arguing that Jiang was unsuitable for marriage to Mao.

Nevertheless, on 28 November 1938, Jiang married Mao with the eventual approval of the Politburo, but with three restrictions as follows: (Note: Various accounts suggest that her role came with certain restrictions, although the specifics varied across sources. When the Kuomintang forces captured Yan'an, they reportedly seized a diary belonging to Wang Ruofei, which detailed the so-called "Three Conditions" imposed on Jiang. Although the original manuscript has not been publicly verified, the version released in Taiwan is considered among the most credible, and used in this article.)

1. Since Mao and He Zizhen had not formally dissolved their marriage, Jiang was prohibited from publicly assuming the title of Mao's wife.
2. Jiang was tasked solely with caring for Mao's daily life and health, and no one else could make similar requests to the Party Central Committee.
3. Jiang was restricted to managing Mao's private affairs. She was barred from holding any Party positions for 20 years and was prohibited from interfering in Party personnel matters or participating in political activities.

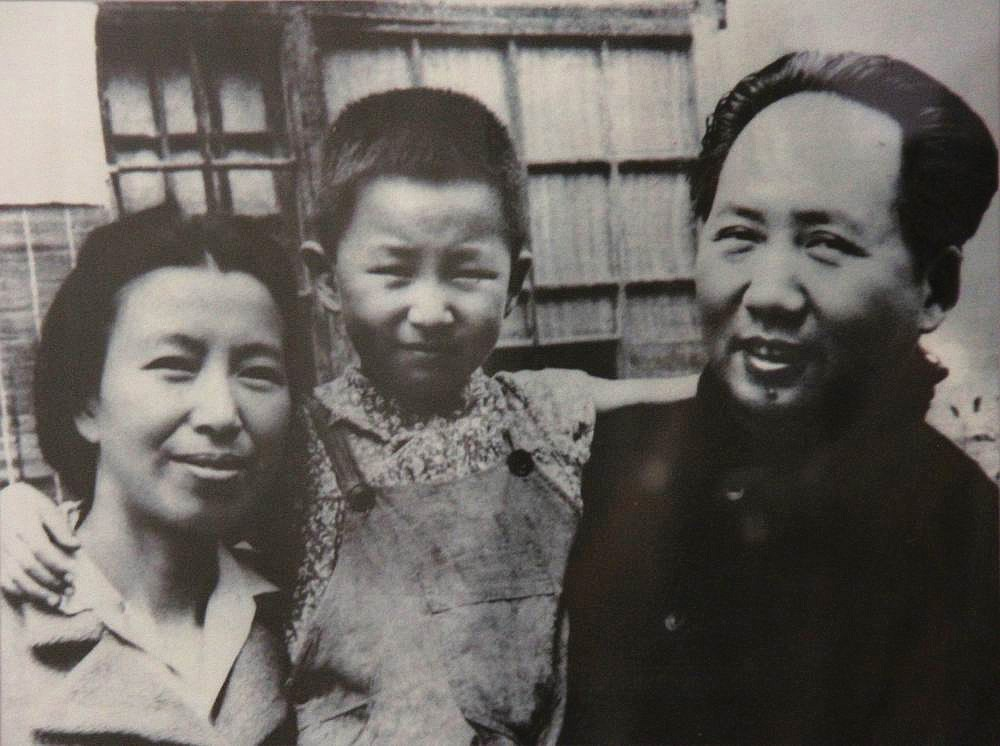
Jiang, Mao and their daughter Li Na

In the early years of their marriage, Mao and Jiang shared a harmonious life. Jiang primarily took on the role of a homemaker, attending to Mao's daily needs. In 1940, she gave birth to their daughter, Li Na. After Li Na's birth, Jiang largely withdrew from the public eye.

=== Beijing and Moscow ===
Sex is engaging in the first rounds; what sustains interest in the long run is power.

— Jiang Qing

==== First Lady ====
After the founding of the People's Republic of China in 1949, Jiang became the nation's first lady. However, her role was concealed from the general public in China and beyond before the 1960s. Jiang also left a generally favourable impression on those who interacted with her. In 1949, after Soong Ching-ling, the widow of Sun Yat-sen, attended the founding ceremony in Beijing and returned to Shanghai, Mao sent Jiang to see her off at the train station. It is said that Soong later remarked that Jiang was "polite and likeable." In 1956, Soong hosted Indonesian President Sukarno at a banquet in Shanghai, where Jiang and Liu Shaoqi’s wife, Wang Guangmei, were also present. Soong reportedly praised Jiang for her refined manners and tasteful attire. During their conversation, Jiang even asked Soong to encourage Mao to wear a suit and tie, noting that Sun Yat-sen often did so and suggesting that foreigners found the simplicity of Chinese officials' clothing too monotonous.

==== Film bureaucracy ====
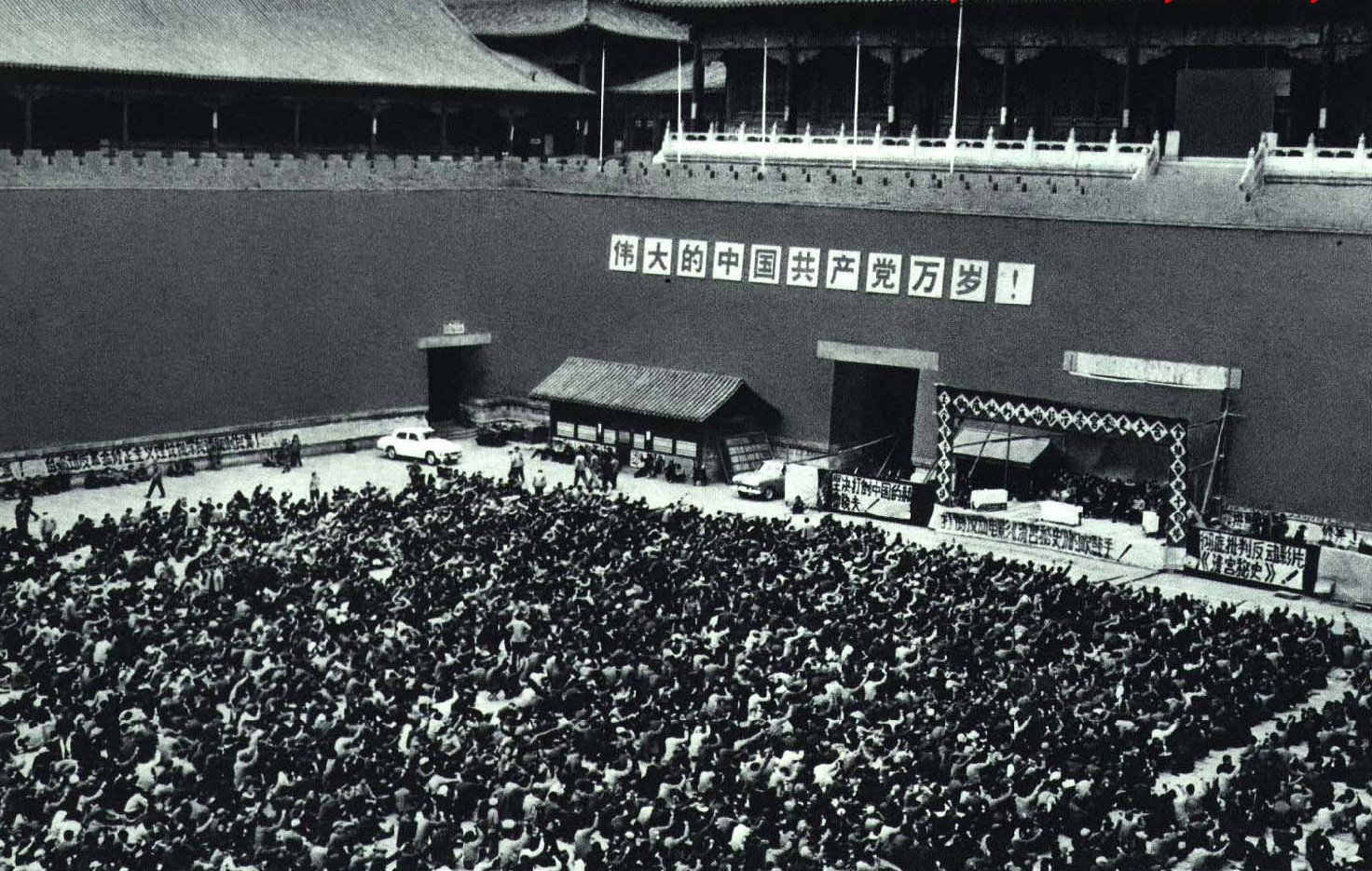
A demonstration against Sorrows of the Forbidden City at the Meridian Gate of the Forbidden City in 1967

Jiang served as the deputy director of the Film Guidance Committee, overseeing the evaluation of film projects from 1949 to 1951. In 1951, Jiang was given a minor position of Film Bureau Chief. After her appointment, Jiang engaged in three attempts in establishing the standard for socialist art. Jiang's first attempt was her advice to ban the 1950 Hong Kong movie Sorrows of the Forbidden City, of which Jiang believed to be unpatriotic. Her opinion was not taken seriously by the communist leadership due to the minor political influence of her office and the movie was distributed in major cities like Beijing and Shanghai. Mao intervened to support her.

Later that year, Jiang critiqued and objected to the distribution of the movie The Life of Wu Xun for glorifying the wealthy landed class while dismissing the peasantry. Again, Jiang's opinion was dismissed. Mao had to intervene to support her again.

Jiang's third attempt involved the role of literary criticism in the development of socialist art. She asked the editor of People's Daily to republish the new literary interpretation of the classic novel Dream of Red Mansions by two young scholars at Shandong University. The editor refused Jiang's request on the grounds that the party newspaper was not a forum for free debate. Again, Mao spoke up on Jiang's behalf.

==== Medical treatment ====
Jiang was in poor health for much of the 1950s, leading her to step back from her official duties. As a result, she had to move back and forth between Beijing and Moscow. In 1949, she was diagnosed with cervical cancer and underwent four rounds of treatment in the Soviet Union. In March 1949, she travelled to Moscow and Yalta, returning in the autumn. She visited Moscow again in 1952, staying until the autumn of 1953. Due to severe pain in her liver, while the Chinese doctors were unable to fulfil their duties due to the Three-Antis Movement, the Soviet doctors explored her liver through surgery. Her life in the Soviet Union was rather reclusive, with only Russian doctors, nurses, bodyguards, and all reading materials only from the Chinese diplomatic mission. In 1956, she made another trip to the Soviet Union for treatment and returned in 1957.

During this period, as a foreign dignitary, she gained access to a wide range of films banned in the Soviet Union, including many Hollywood productions. This exposure allowed her to stay informed about Western art trends, which later influenced her transformation of the Peking Opera. In 1957, Jiang recovered from cervical cancer, though she believed she was still unwell, contrary to her doctors’ assessment of her good health. Therefore, they recommended that she engage in therapeutic activities such as watching films, listening to music, and attending theatre and concerts.

==== Cover-up ====
During the Campaign to Suppress Counterrevolutionaries, Zhao Yaoshan, the Zhongtong agent who interrogated Jiang during her arrest in the 1930s, was executed. In January 1953, Yang Fan, who had secretly written to Yan'an about Jiang's experiences in Shanghai, was imprisoned. Pan Hannian, the Communist intelligence chief who defended Yang, was also jailed.

In December, Mao travelled to Hangzhou with Jiang. After his departure on 14 March, Jiang received an anonymous letter from Shanghai later that month, which mentioned Jiang's scandals and betrayal in Shanghai. Initially disturbed and then angered, she sought out Zhejiang provincial party chief Tan Qilong, asserting her revolutionary commitment and requesting an investigation. Despite extensive police efforts, the sender's identity remained unknown.

In 1958, while Mao attended a meeting in Nanning, he met Yu Qiwei, (Note: He was known as Huang Jing at the time and had married the journalist Fan Jin in Yan'an. Yu Qiwei and Jiang Qing had lived together but they did not have any certificate or wedding ceremony. Their relationship could be deemed as a "modern marriage", or a form of cohabitation as per Chinese-language literature.) who used to have a romantic relationship with Jiang. After Mao fiercely criticised the lack of support from Yu and his supervisor Zhou Enlai during the Great Leap Forward, Yu experienced severe mental and physical distress. Upon arriving at Guangzhou Airport, he kowtowed before Li Fuchun, pleading to be "spared." Li then escorted him to a military hospital. There, Yu attempted suicide by jumping out of a window, resulting in a broken leg. Yu died a few months later, and Mao sent a wreath in his name alone as a gesture of condolence.

In 1961, Zhu Ming, the widow of Lin Boqu, wrote to the Party Central Committee regarding her late husband. Her handwriting matched that of the anonymous letter. Zhu later admitted to writing the letter and committed suicide.

== Cultural Revolution ==
=== Prelude ===
Before 1962, the Chinese media never mentioned who Mao's wife was in its international propaganda. People close to Mao claimed that after the 1950s, Jiang was rarely seen by his side, and their emotional relationship had essentially ended, leaving her feeling frustrated for a time. However, as the 1960s progressed, Mao became increasingly distrustful of the surrounding leaders and his judgment of the domestic political situation grew more severe. Jiang capitalised on this shift, becoming more outspoken, which led Mao to view her as "politically sensitive" and start to trust her. As a result, her power grew steadily.

After Jiang's return to China from the Soviet Union in 1962, she frequently attended local opera performances. In 1963, Jiang enlisted A Jia to help modernise Beijing Opera with revolutionary socialist themes. She later instructed the Beijing Municipal Opera Company to create Shajiabang, depicting the struggle between the Kuomintang and Communists during the Second Sino-Japanese War, and tasked the Shanghai Beijing Opera Company with producing Taking Tiger Mountain by Strategy. In her first public speech in June 1964 at a Peking Opera convention, Jiang criticised regional opera troupes for glorifying emperors, generals, scholars, and other ox-demons and snake-spirits.

Jiang's efforts to reform Peking Opera gained approval from the Communist leadership, especially during the 1964 Modern Beijing Opera Trial Performance Convention. She also formed a productive collaboration with Yu Huiyong, to push the yangbanxi (model drama) projects. Their shared vision focused on creating operas that reflected modern Chinese society and the lives of the working class, starting with On the Docks, which portrayed Communist-ruled Shanghai. Jiang's political influence helped ensure the success of these projects, which aimed to create revolutionary art that represented the reality of contemporary life.

=== Cultural reforms ===
Poster showing Jiang promoting the fine arts during the Cultural Revolution while holding Mao's Little Red Book. The slogan reads: "The invincible thoughts of Mao illuminate the stages of revolutionary art!"

From 1962 onwards, Jiang began appearing publicly as Mao's wife and later gave frequent speeches in the cultural and propaganda sectors, criticizing and condemning various figures. By late 1965, as Jiang's influence grew, she rallied close allies such as Zhang Chunqiao and Yao Wenyuan. She organised a campaign to criticise the play Hai Rui Dismissed from Office, which marked the beginning of the Cultural Revolution.

In February 1966, Jiang hosted a forum with PLA officers, the Military Arts & Literature Work Conference, which she planned in conjunction with Lin Biao. Jiang organized the forum in direct emulation of the Yan'an Forum. The group studied writings by Mao, watched films and plays, and met with the cast and crew of an in-progress film production. The forum concluded that a "black line" of bourgeois thought dominated the arts since the PRC's founding. According to this interpretation, the history of socialist culture was a class struggle between reactionary and proletarian lines, and a large majority of writers failed to resist bourgeois ideological influence. The group contended that cultural workers should be totally reorganised. A summary of Jiang's analysis at the forum was later distributed widely during the Cultural Revolution and became a significant document.

Over April through June 1966, Jiang presided over the All-Army Artistic Creation Conference in Beijing. Conference attendees evaluated a total of 80 domestic and foreign films. Jiang approved of 7 as consistent with Mao Thought and criticised the other films. Backed by her husband, she was appointed deputy director of the Central Cultural Revolution Group (CCRG) in 1966 and emerged as a serious political figure in the summer of that year.

==== Revolutionary operas ====
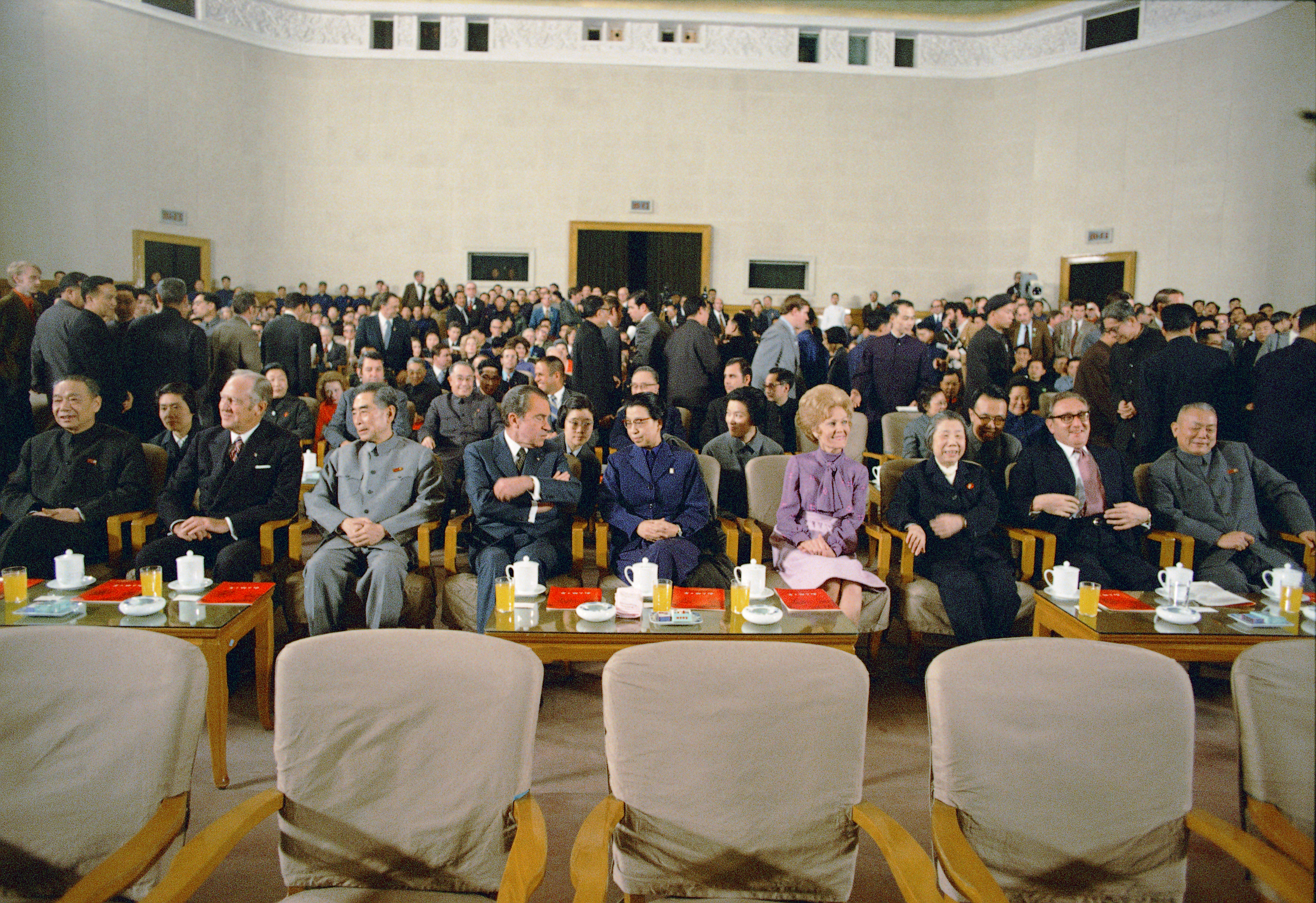
Jiang (in the centre) watching The Red Detachment of Women with President and Mrs Nixon and others

In 1967 Jiang declared eight works of performance art to be the new models for proletarian literature and art. These "model operas", or "revolutionary operas", were designed to glorify Mao, The People's Liberation Army, and the revolutionary struggles. The ballets White-Haired Girl, Red Detachment of Women, and Shajiabang were included in the list of eight, and were closely associated with Jiang, because of their inclusion of elements from Chinese and Western opera, dance, and music.

The Red Guards condemned Yu Huiyong to be a "bad element" for propagating feudalism through his utilisation of traditional Chinese music in operas. Yu was also tagged as "a democrat hiding under the banner of the Communist Party" due to his frequent absences in party meetings. In 1966, Yu was subsequently sent to a Cow Shed, a small room where the "bad elements" were confined. In October 1966, Yu was released after Jiang requested a meeting with Yu to stage the production of two operas in Beijing. Jiang seated Yu next to her, as a display of Yu's importance in the making of yangbanxi, during the showing of Taking Tiger Mountain by Strategy.

During Richard Nixon's famous visit to China in February 1972, he watched Red Detachment of Women, and was impressed by the opera. He famously asked Jiang who the writer, director, and composer were, to which she replied it was "created by the masses."

==== Fashion designs ====
External image
- Jiang Qing's Robe

In 1974, Jiang directed the Ministry of Culture to design a new dress for Chinese women, inspired by elements of women's clothing from the Song dynasty. The dress was called the Jiang Dress. The dress featured a symmetrical V-neckline, differing slightly from the traditional Y-shaped neckline of Hanfu. Mockingly dubbed the "Nun's Robe," Jiang intended for female cadres to lead the way in wearing it, with the eventual goal of making it a nationwide standard.

=== Political activism ===
During this period, Mao galvanised students and young workers as his paramilitary organisation the Red Guards to attack what he termed as revisionists in the party. Mao argued that the revolution was in danger and that they must do all they could to stop the emergence of a privileged class in China. He argued this is what had happened in the Soviet Union under Khrushchev and Brezhnev. With time, Jiang began playing an increasingly active political role in the movement. She took part in most important Party and government activities. Jiang took advantage of the Cultural Revolution to wreak vengeance on her personal enemies, including people who had slighted her during her acting career in the 1930s. Alongside Zhang Chunqiao, Yao Wenyuan, and Wang Hongwen, Jiang would form a group informally dubbed by Mao as the "Gang of Four." She became a prominent member of the Central Cultural Revolution Group and a major player in Chinese politics from 1966 to 1976.

==== 1966–1969 ====
From 1962, Chairman Liu Shaoqi and his wife Wang Guangmei frequently appeared at diplomatic events, earning Wang the title of "First Lady," which made Jiang jealous. Before Wang's overseas trips, Jiang advised her not to wear jewellery, claiming it looked better. However, upon seeing Wang on television wearing a necklace, Jiang criticised her for displaying "bourgeois style" in a talk with Red Guards.

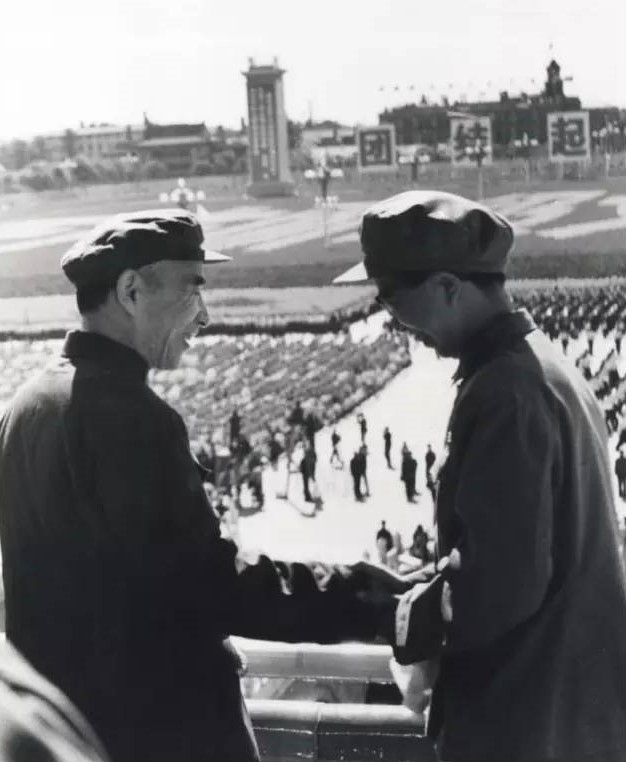
Lin Biao with Jiang at Tiananmen in 1966

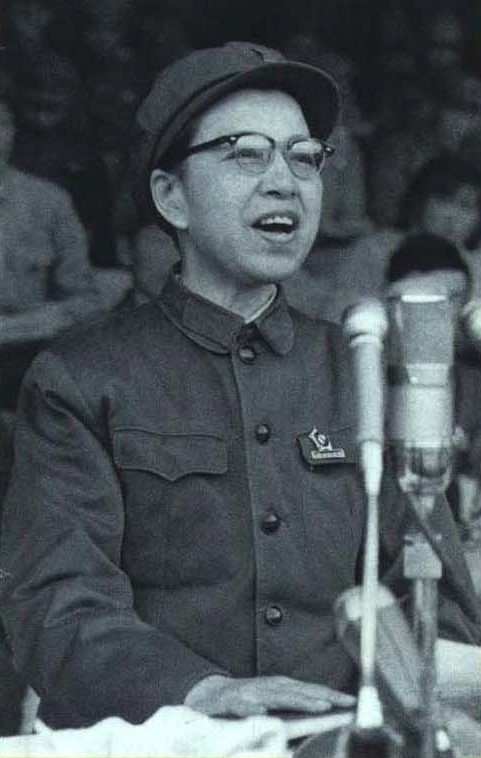
Jiang during the Cultural Revolution

On 13 December 1966, Liu Shaoqi voluntarily offered to resign from his positions as President. He proposed moving with his wife and children to Yan'an or his hometown in Hunan to take up farming, hoping to bring the Cultural Revolution to an early conclusion and minimise the damage to the country. On 18 December, Zhang Chunqiao, deputy head of the Central Cultural Revolution Group, summoned Kuai Dafu, a leader of the Red Guards at Tsinghua University, and instructed him to launch a campaign to overthrow Liu Shaoqi. On 25 December, Kuai Dafu led thousands of demonstrators in Tiananmen Square, where they publicly chanted the slogan "Down with Liu Shaoqi."

The Central Cultural Revolution Group was initially a small body under the Standing Committee of the Politburo. With the backing of Jiang, Zhang Chunqiao and Yao Wenyuan initiated a coup in Shanghai in January 1967, consolidating power and gaining support from revolutionary factions like that of Wang Hongwen's. On 6 January 1967, Red Guards at Tsinghua University, with Jiang's backing, lured Wang Guangmei to the campus under the pretext of her daughter being in a car accident. Once there, Wang was detained and prosecuted.

Following the Red Guards' disruption of party structures in January 1967, this group replaced the Secretariat and became the central command for the party. Jiang's role as the "First Deputy Head" of the group grew significantly, elevating her political power. Chen Boda, the nominal leader of the group, was repeatedly humiliated by Jiang during this period. Fearing her power, he endured her mistreatment in silence. In one notable incident, after a middle school student scaled his wall, Chen's wife, Zhu Yuren, reported the event, sparking a "footprint incident" that enraged Jiang, who considered the reporting as an overreaction. She demanded Chen move out of Zhongnanhai, and this further strained his relationship with her. Seizing the opportunity, Lin Biao and his wife, Ye Qun, aligned with Chen, who quietly defected to their faction.

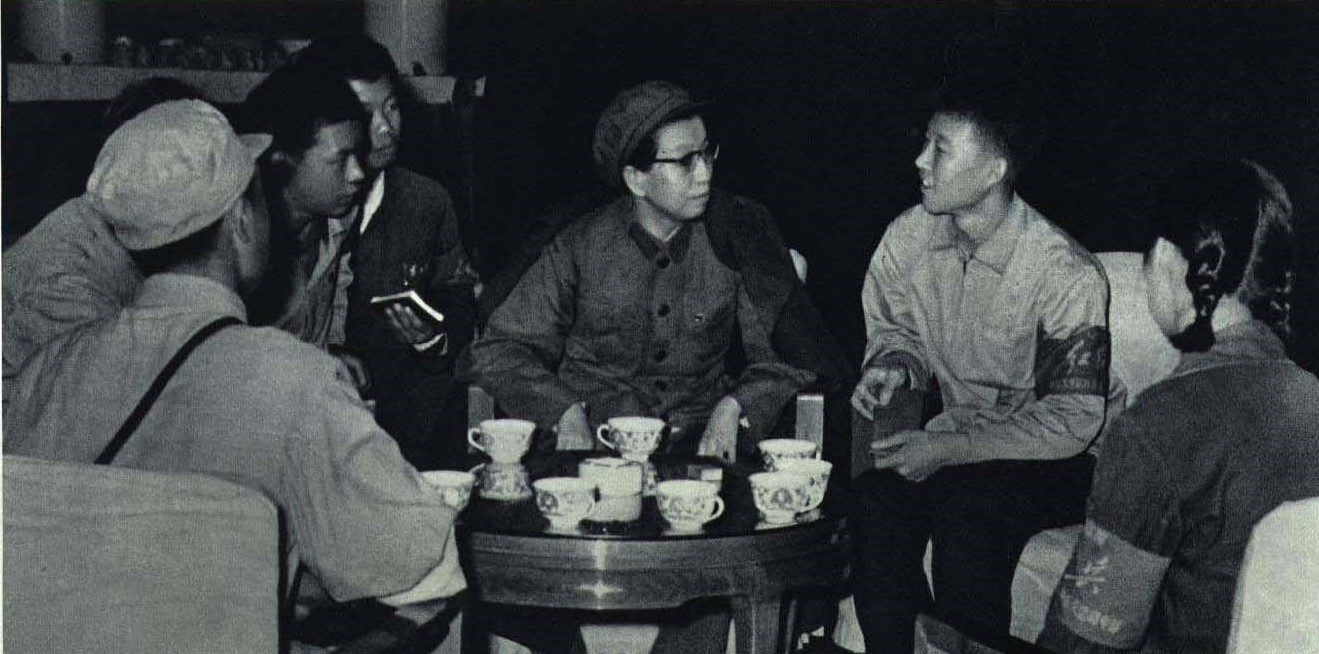
Jiang met Red Guards in 1967

On 18 July 1967, a public struggle session against Liu Shaoqi was held in Zhongnanhai. On 5 August, the Central Cultural Revolution Group approved three separate struggle sessions targeting Liu Shaoqi and Wang Guangmei, Deng Xiaoping and Zhuo Lin, and Tao Zhu and Zeng Zhi. From that point, Liu Shaoqi was completely stripped of his personal freedom. On 16 September 1968, under Jiang's leadership, a special investigation team compiled three volumes of so-called evidence against Liu, largely extracted through torture and coercion. After being imprisoned in Zhongnanhai for over two years, Liu Shaoqi was transferred to Kaifeng, Henan Province, on 17 October 1969, where he subsequently died.

Meanwhile, Jiang's stature continued to rise, though she was still not a member of the Central Committee during the 11th Plenary Session of the 8th Central Committee. At the 9th National Congress of the Chinese Communist Party in April 1969, Jiang was admitted to the Politburo after Mao shifted his stance, likely to balance the power of the Lin Biao faction. Mao also approved the entry of Lin Biao's wife, Ye Qun, into the Politburo, further consolidating their influence.

==== 1969–1971 ====
At the 9th National Congress of the Communist Party, Jiang condemned quotation songs, which had been promoted since September 1966 as mnemonic devices for the study of Quotations from Chairman Mao. Jiang had come to view the popular tunes as akin to yellow music.

Jiang's rivalry with, and personal dislike of, Zhou Enlai led Jiang to hurt Zhou where he was most vulnerable. In 1968, Jiang had Zhou's adopted son (Sun Yang) and daughter (Sun Weishi) tortured and murdered by Red Guards. Sun Yang was murdered in the basement of Renmin University. After Sun Weishi died following seven months of torture in a secret prison (at Jiang's direction), Jiang made sure that Sun's body was cremated and disposed of so that no autopsy could be performed and Sun's family could not have her ashes. In 1968, Jiang forced Zhou to sign an arrest warrant for his own brother. In 1973 and 1974, Jiang directed the "Criticise Lin, Criticise Confucius" campaign against premier Zhou because Zhou was viewed as one of Jiang's primary political opponents. In 1975, Jiang initiated a campaign named "Criticizing Song Jiang, Evaluating the Water Margin", which encouraged the use of Zhou as an example of a political loser. After Zhou Enlai died in 1976, Jiang initiated the "Five No's" campaign in order to discourage and prohibit any public mourning for Zhou. When traditional landscape and bird-and-flower paintings re-emerged in the early 1970s, Jiang criticised these traditional forms as "black paintings", which in fact targeted Zhou Enlai.

==== 1971–1973 ====
Jiang first collaborated with then second-in-charge Lin Biao, but after Lin Biao's death in 1971, she turned against him publicly in the Criticise Lin, Criticise Confucius Campaign. After the September 13 Incident in 1971, Jiang saw the collapse of the Lin Biao faction and, with Mao's declining health, she became eager to seize the highest power in the country. In 1972, Jiang enlisted American scholar Roxane Witke to write her autobiography. After 1972, Mao's health deteriorated. Though Mao was largely cut off from the outside world due to his illness, Zhu De sent Mao a letter informing him about Jiang's biography. This revelation deeply angered Mao, who, in a fit of rage, even expressed his desire to expel Jiang from the Politburo and sever their political ties. By 1973, although unreported due to it being a personal matter, Mao and his wife Jiang had separated.

==== 1973–1976 ====
On 10 March 1973, Deng Xiaoping was reinstated as Vice Premier, serving as Zhou Enlai's deputy. During the 10th National Congress of the CCP, Deng remained a member of the Central Committee but he did not gain a seat on the Politburo. On 10 April 1974, Deng led the Chinese delegation to the United Nations General Assembly. Although Jiang strongly opposed Deng's appointment, Mao cautioned her in a letter to cease opposing his decision.

In 1974, Jiang visited the Twentieth Army as part of her effort to propagate the Criticize Lin, Criticize Confucius campaign. Jiang's visit lacked approval from the Politburo Standing Committee or the Central Military Commission and was viewed as a violation of non-fraternization policies. As of 2025, the incident is still cited as a prominent warning against violating civil-military organizational boundaries.

After Zhou Enlai was hospitalised, Wang Hongwen managed the Politburo, Deng Xiaoping oversaw the State Council, and Ye Jianying led the Central Military Commission. On 4 October 1974, Mao proposed appointing Deng as First Vice Premier. Sensing that Deng might replace Zhou Enlai at the upcoming Fourth National People's Congress, Jiang attempted to block Deng from taking charge of the State Council and the Party's central operations.

On 12 December, Mao reaffirmed his support for Deng by proposing his appointment as a member of both the Military Commission and the Politburo—a suggestion that gained majority approval from Politburo members. On 23 December, despite his ill health, Zhou Enlai flew to Changsha to meet Mao and seek his endorsement of Deng Xiaoping, with Wang Hongwen also in attendance. Mao agreed and, while pointing at Wang, remarked that Deng's "politics is better than his." Mao spoke English for the word "politics." Wang was embarrassed as he did not understand.

== Downfall ==
=== Protests ===
By the mid-1970s, Jiang spearheaded the campaign against Deng Xiaoping. Yet, the Chinese public became intensely discontented at politics and chose to blame Jiang, a more accessible and easier target than Mao.

In January 1976, official news announced the death of Zhou Enlai. Zhou was highly respected in Chinese society, second only to Mao in influence. However, no official commemorative activities were organised following his death. On 5 March and 25 March, Wenhui Daily published two reports criticising Deng Xiaoping, indirectly accusing Zhou Enlai of being the "biggest capitalist roader" who had supported and protected Deng. Starting on 21 March, students at Nanjing University began questioning and condemning Wenhui Daily and the criticisms of Zhou in Shanghai. On 29 March, the students escalated their protests by writing large slogans on trains departing from Nanjing, spreading their message nationwide. On 30 March, members of the All-China Federation of Trade Unions, including Cao Zhijie, posted signed wall posters in Beijing. These posters transformed the veiled political dissent into open protest, marking the beginning of the Tiananmen protests in Beijing.

Many Chinese instinctively believe that it was Jiang who ordered the removal of the wreaths dedicated to Zhou Enlai from Tiananmen Square. In response, slogans appeared, such as "Down with the Empress Dowager, down with Indira Gandhi." Another individual placed a wreath in honour of Mao's revered second wife, Yang Kaihui, who had been executed by Chiang Kai-shek in 1930. Jiang was often referred to obliquely as "that woman" or "three drops of water," a reference to part of the Chinese character for her name. The protests eventually evolved into a riot, with cars ignited by angry protesters and militia intervention.

=== Coup d'état ===
On 5 September 1976, Jiang was informed of the critical illness of Mao and soon returned to Beijing. On the evening of 8 September, she drove to Xinhua News Agency trying to find supporters, and returned to Zhongnanhai late in night, where high-rank Chinese officials and Mao's family members were present. Jiang could not fall asleep. She needed to confront two other factions within the party, Hua Guofeng, who had already received a note from Mao saying, "With you in charge, I am at ease", and Deng Xiaoping, who was being attacked by Jiang. She approached Hua secretly, proposing to expel Deng in the Politburo meeting before Mao's death, but she did not succeed.

Mao died on 9 September. The funeral services were hosted by Wang Hongwen, with a million people assembled at Tiananmen Square to mourn his death. Jiang sent a large wreath of chrysanthemums and greenery, as his student and comrade, rather than his widow. Hua was the designated successor of Mao and soon became the party chief and became embroiled in a power struggle with the Gang of Four. Jiang went to Baoding to rally the 38th Army, preparing to replace Hua as a party chief. In response, both Ye Jianying, one of Deng's allies, and Hua mobilised their military forces in Beijing and Guangzhou. Xu Shiyou warned a north expedition from Guangzhou, if Jiang had not been arrested in Beijing. In 4–5 October, Hua continued to negotiate with Jiang's allies on the personnel arrangement and agreed to continue the talk the following day.

On 6 October, Zhang Chunqiao and Wang Hongwen were arrested when they arrived at Zhongnanhai. Jiang and Yao Wenyuan were arrested at their homes. Hua, supported by the military and state security, had Jiang and the rest of the Gang arrested and removed from their party positions. According to Zhang Yaoci, who carried out the arrest, Jiang did not say much when she was arrested. It was reported that one of her servants spat at her as she was being taken away under a flurry of blows by onlookers and police.

In May 1975, Mao once criticised the Gang of Four for leaning too heavily on empiricism. However, he downplayed the severity of their issue, stating that it was not a significant problem but needed to be addressed. Mao remarked,

If it cannot be resolved in the first half of the year, then address it in the second half; if it cannot be resolved this year, then next year; and if not next year, then the year after. (Note: Chinese: 我看问题不大，不要小题大作，但有问题要讲明白，上半年解决不了，下半年解决；今年解决不了，明年解决；明年解决不了，后年解决。)

The remark served as a justification for Hua Guofeng to arrest the Gang of Four.

=== Televised trial ===
Jiang at her trial in 1980

Hua was later outmaneuvered and replaced by Deng Xiaoping, who proceeded with prosecuting Jiang. At the time of her arrest, the country lacked the proper institutions for a legal trial. As a result, she and the other members of the Gang of Four were held in a state of limbo for the first six months of their capture. Following prompt legal modernisation, an indictment was brought forward, formally titled "Indictment of the Special Procuratorate under the Supreme People's Procuratorate of the People’s Republic of China." The indictment contained 48 separate counts.

In November 1980, the government announced that Jiang and nine others would stand trial. She was tried with the other three members of the Gang of Four and six associates. She was accused of persecuting artists during the Cultural Revolution, and authorising the burgling of the homes of writers and performers in Shanghai to destroy material related to Jiang's early career that could harm her reputation. Xinhua News Agency reported that Jiang initially sought to recruit her own lawyers but rejected those recommended by the special team after interviews. Meanwhile, five of the ten defendants agreed to be represented by government-appointed lawyers who would act as their defence counsel.

External videos
- Trial of Jiang Qing I (footage edited by TVB, Cantonese and Mandarin)
- Trial of Jiang Qing II (footage edited by TVB, Cantonese and Mandarin)
- Jiang Qing sentenced to death (footage edited by CTS, Mandarin)

Jiang was defiant in the court. She argued to the special prosecution teams that Mao should also be held accountable for her actions. Whenever a witness took the stand, there was a chance the court proceedings would devolve into a shouting match. She did not deny the accusations, and insisted that she had been protecting Mao and following his instructions. Jiang remarked:

I was Chairman Mao's dog. I bit whomever he asked me to bite. (Note: Chinese: 我是毛主席的一条狗，毛主席叫我咬谁我就咬谁。)

Her defence strategy was marked by attempts to transcend the court room and appeal to history and the logic of revolution. Jiang sought to challenge Hua Guofeng's authority within the Party, with a significant yet unverifiable claim,

[A]bout that night Mao Zedong wrote the words, "With you in charge, I'm at ease" for Hua Guofeng. [...] That was not all Chairman Mao wrote to Hua. He wrote six more characters: "If you have questions, ask Jiang Qing." (Note: Chinese: 那天晚上毛主席给华国锋写“你办事，我放心”的话，这不是毛主席给华国锋写的全部内容，至少还写了六个字：“有问题，找江青”。)

The court announced its verdict after six weeks of testimony and debate and four weeks of deliberations. In early 1981, she was convicted and sentenced to death with a two-year reprieve. She was assigned the highest level of criminal liability among the defendants as a "ringleader" of a counterrevolutionary group. Wu Xiuquan recounted in his memoir that the court room erupted into applause as the verdict was read and Jiang was dragged out of the court room by two female guards while shouting revolutionary slogans.

== Death and burial ==
=== Internment and illness ===
Following her arrest, Jiang was held at Qincheng Prison, where she occupied herself with activities such as reading newspapers, listening to radio broadcasts, watching television, knitting, studying books, and writing. Her daughter, Li Na, visited her fortnightly. Jiang was reportedly treated well during her sentence. The sentence was commuted to life imprisonment in 1983. The Supreme People's Court determined that both Jiang and her chief associate, Zhang, had demonstrated "sufficient repentance" during their two-year reprieve, leading to their death sentences being commuted. However, senior Chinese officials stated that Jiang had not shown genuine remorse and remained as defiant as the day she was removed from a crowded courtroom, shouting, "Long Live the Revolution." In 1984, Jiang was granted medical parole, but multiple official Chinese sources and media reports subsequently suggested she never left Qincheng.

According to Ross Terrill's biography of Jiang, in December 1988, on the occasion of Mao's 95th birth anniversary, Jiang requested approval to hold a family gathering, but her petition was denied. Distressed, she attempted suicide by ingesting 50 sleeping pills she had secretly saved. The attempt failed. Jiang believed that Deng Xiaoping should be held responsible for the Tiananmen Square protests, as he tolerated Western ideologies. She also condemned the subsequent massacre that followed the protests, emphasising that Mao had never ordered the army to massacre crowds. According to Terrill's biography, Jiang returned to prison in 1989 when parole ended. While in custody, Jiang was diagnosed with throat cancer, and doctors advised surgery. She refused, asserting that losing her voice was unacceptable. In November 1989, the CCP Central Committee approved another medical parole for Jiang. When discussing her accommodation, she insisted on either returning to Mao’s former residence in Zhongnanhai or going back to Building 17 of the Diaoyutai State Guesthouse, her primary stronghold during the Cultural Revolution. When both requests were rejected, she turned to the officials from the General Office of the Central Committee and made a slit-throat gesture with the side of her right hand, signaling she would have to commit suicide again. Eventually, after the General Office arranged a two-story villa at Jiuxianqiao and assigned a nurse to care for her, she acquiesced and began receiving treatment.

Terrill's account of Jiang's last days was largely refuted by He Diankui, who served as director of the supervision department at Qincheng Prison during Jiang's time there. According to He, Jiang never left Qincheng until her death, nor did she attempt suicide in 1988 or move to Jiuxianqiao in 1989. Instead, following her medical parole in 1984, she was assigned to a separate courtyard building within Qincheng that had formerly served as a laundry facility for war criminals. The courtyard, renovated after the war criminals were released, was partitioned into three rooms for her use: the easternmost room served as a recreation room with a television, the middle room housed staff on duty, and the westernmost room was her bedroom, which had an attached bathroom. The wall between her bedroom and the duty room was made entirely of glass above a height of one meter, allowing her activities to be observed at all times. A team of four monitored her around the clock..

=== Suicide ===
According to Ross Terrill's biography of Jiang, on 15 March 1991, Jiang was transferred to the Beijing Police Hospital from her residence at Jiuxianqiao due to a high fever. By 18 March, her fever had subsided. She was then moved to a ward within the hospital compound, which included a bedroom, bathroom, and living room. On 10 May 1991, she tore apart her memoir manuscript in front of others and expressed a wish to return to her home. Two days later, on 12 May, her daughter and son-in-law came to visit her in the hospital after learning about her condition, but Jiang declined to meet them. On 14 May 1991, Jiang died by suicide. At 3:30 a.m., a nurse entered her room and found her hanging above the bathtub, having died. However, He Diankui, former director of the supervision department at Qincheng who claimed Jiang never left the prison despite her parole, refuted Terrill's biography by claiming that Jiang died in prison from taking sleeping pills.

Multiple accounts aligning with the version that Jiang spent her final days in prison claim that on 13 May 1991, the 25th anniversary of her appointment to the Cultural Revolution Group, she wrote "a day worthy of commemoration in history" on the front page of a People's Daily newspaper.

According to Japan's Shūkan Bunshun, the magazine obtained Jiang's 20-page suicide note, which was largely a tirade against the current leadership of the CCP. The unverified note read:

Today the revolution has been stolen by the revisionist clique of Deng Xiaoping, Peng Zhen, and Yang Shangkun. Chairman Mao exterminated Liu (Liu Shaoqi), but not Deng, and so unending evils have been unleashed on the Chinese people and nation. Chairman, your student and fighter is coming to see you! (Note: Chinese: 现在被邓小平、彭真、杨尚昆一伙反革命修正主义吞并了领导权。主席除刘未除邓，后患无穷，国祸民殃。主席，你的学生和战友来见你了！)

The afternoon of Jiang's death, Li Na, the daughter of Jiang, went to the hospital to sign the death certificate and agreed that no funeral or memorial service would be held. On 18 May, Jiang's remains were cremated. Neither Li Na nor any of Jiang's other relatives attended the cremation. Jiang's ashes were entrusted to Li Na, who kept them at her home. On 3 June, Time magazine broke the news, reporting that Jiang was "believed to have hanged herself at the suburban Beijing villa where she had been under virtual house arrest..." The following day, the Chinese government confirmed her death via a Xinhua News Agency dispatch, stating that Jiang, "a principal culprit in the Lin Biao and Jiang Qing counter-revolutionary cliques, committed suicide at her residence in Beijing in the early morning of 14 May 1991 while on medical parole."

=== Burial ===
While imprisoned, Jiang expressed in her will a desire to be buried in her hometown of Zhucheng, Shandong. In 1996, Yan Changgui, Jiang's former secretary, visited Zhucheng, where the city's Party Secretary asked him to convey to Li Na that Jiang could be buried there, pending her consent. However, after the 16th National Congress of the CCP, Jiang Zemin suggested to Li Na that Zhucheng might not be a secure burial site. Instead, Li Na inquired about the possibility of burial in Beijing, which Jiang Zemin approved. Li Na arranged the burial at her own expense. In March 2002, Jiang's ashes were interred at the Futian Cemetery in Beijing's Western Hills scenic area. The tombstone reads: "The Grave of Mother Li Yunhe, 1914–1991, respectfully erected by her daughter, son-in-law, and grandson."

== Legacy ==
=== Public image ===
Jiang was never a widely admired figure throughout her life. Her marriage to Mao in the 1930s scandalised many of the more puritanical comrades in Yan'an. During the Cultural Revolution, she did little to win the favour of other Chinese leaders.

Jiang is often viewed as a figure of naked ambition, with many perceiving her as a typical power-hungry wife of an emperor, seeking to secure power for herself through questionable means. Her public image is largely shaped by her self-serving narrative, which portrays her as a central figure in the turbulent and cutthroat environment of Chinese leadership. She is seen as embodying the ruthless, unpredictable, and dangerous nature of life at the top. Her long-standing vendetta against former cultural-political rivals from her acting days in Shanghai has fueled her reputation for vindictiveness. Though she framed her conflicts with these men as ideological battles, it is widely believed that personal grudges and animosities were the true driving forces behind her actions.

According to Roxane Witke, Jiang's early life was marked by poverty, hunger, and violence, and later, as a woman in a male-dominated world, she faced numerous challenges. These experiences shaped her defensive and aggressive personality, fostering an opportunism that persisted even when she no longer needed to assert herself. Jiang's televised trials and her defiance in court have softened hatred towards her among the younger generations, who became sceptical of China's Communist system.

==== Official historiography ====
还有精生白骨，自比则天武后，铁帚扫而光。

— 郭沫若《水调歌头·粉碎四人帮》(1976)
Translation:

And the White-Boned Demon, self-styled as Wu Zetian, was swept away by the iron broom.

— Crackdown on the Gang of Four, Guo Moruo (1976)

After Jiang's arrest in 1976, the Chinese government launched a massive propaganda campaign to vilify her and the other members of the so-called Gang of Four. Orchestrated under the authoritarian political culture of Mao's successor Hua Guofeng, this campaign aimed to discredit Jiang and her associates entirely. In the years leading to her trial in 1980, millions of posters and cartoons depicted the Gang of Four as class enemies and spies. Jiang herself became the primary target of ridicule, portrayed as an empress scheming to succeed Mao and as a prostitute, with references to her past as a Shanghai actress used to question her moral integrity. The propaganda also criticised her interest in Western pastimes, such as photography and poker, portraying them as evidence of her lack of communist values. Ultimately, she was branded the "white-boned demon," a gendered caricature symbolising destruction and chaos.

The 1980 Gang of Four trial solidified Jiang's image as a manipulative and villainous figure. The indictment held the Gang responsible for the violence of the Cultural Revolution, accusing Jiang of using political purges for personal vendettas and fostering large-scale chaos. Widely broadcast both within and outside China, the trial reinforced a clear dichotomy: Jiang as a symbol of the past's chaos, and Deng Xiaoping's administration as the harbinger of order and progress. This narrative was consistent with the CCP's Resolution on History, which sought to redefine Mao's legacy. While Mao was criticised for "errors," he was not held directly accountable for the excesses of the Cultural Revolution. Instead, full blame was shifted to Jiang and the Gang of Four, allowing Mao Thought to remain ideologically valid under Deng's reforms.

==== Comparisons ====
The 2013 trial of Bo Xilai was regarded as the most dramatic courtroom event in China since Jiang's trial in 1980. Bo's wife, Gu Kailai, was frequently likened to Jiang due to the nature of her crimes. In 2024, Yomiuri Shimbun reported on Peng Liyuan's influence over key personnel decisions within the CCP. The report highlighted her backing of Dong Jun's appointment as Minister of Defence and Li Ganjie's selection as head of the CCP Organisation Department. Dong and Li were both from Shandong, where Peng was born. The report drew parallels between Bo Xilai's leadership in his later years and Mao's, likening Peng to Jiang.

=== Memorials ===
Jiang's grave remained undisclosed to the public until early 2009. Each year during the Tomb-Sweeping Festival, flower baskets are placed at Jiang's tomb. In 2015, leftist activists attempting to pay their respects faced resistance from dozens of security guards, with several taken to Pingguoyuan Police Station for interrogation. Frustrated Maoist supporters questioned why publicly honouring Chiang Kai-shek was permitted while commemorating Jiang was not, asking if the Republic of China had somehow reclaimed the mainland. Since 2018, such commemorations have proceeded without police interference. On 14 May 2021, leftist activists held a panel discussion on "the Role of Li Jin in the History of the Party", which Li Na reportedly attended. Since 2021, as large numbers of visitors continued to honour Jiang, international media noted that authorities allowed leftist groups to commemorate her while prohibiting public mourning for Zhao Ziyang. Following this, the authorities banned public mourning for her at her gravesite, with surveillance cameras and security guards constantly monitoring the situation.

=== Peking Opera ===
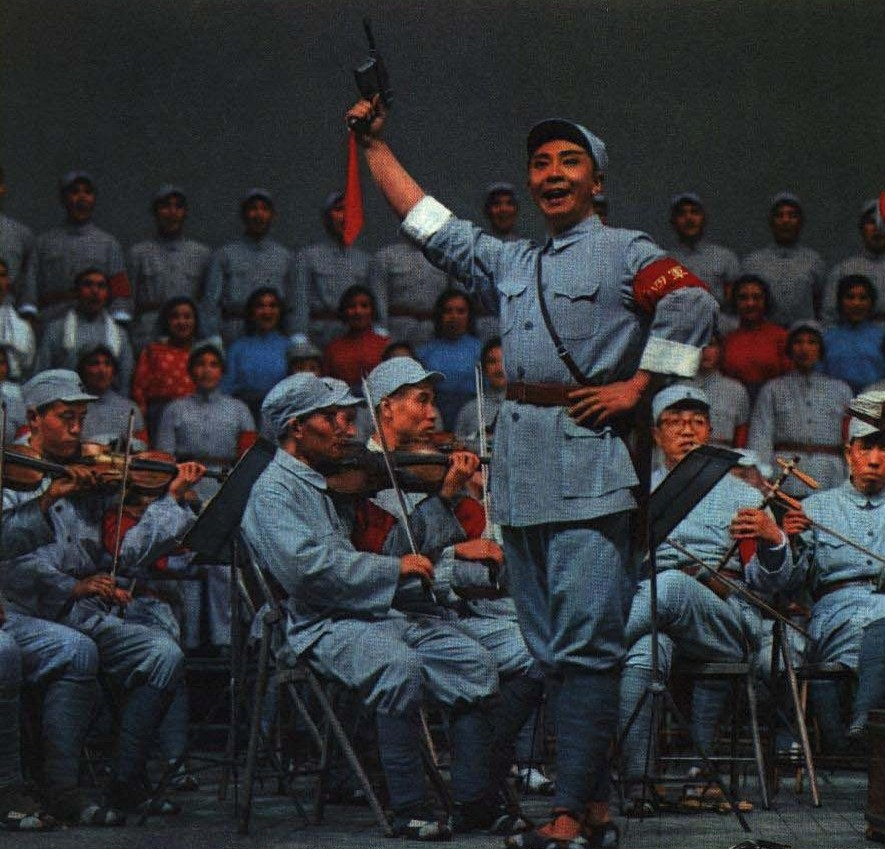
Symphony in the Peking Opera Shajiabang in 1967

During the production of yangbanxi, Jiang had shown keen intuition, due to her experience as an actress, in showing the shape yangbanxi should take. However, Jiang's directions on opera reforms were often vague. Yu, acting as the pawn of Jiang, was able to manifest Jiang's orders into technical details that can be followed by the performers. Despite Yu's growing influence, he was never able to defy Jiang's orders, as he could only influence her thinking.

Jiang identified the weakness of Beijing opera as the lack of well organised music, which according to Jiang, "builds the image of the characters." This conception was influenced by Yu's writing on the functional conception of music. Yu focused on reforming the language of music. This was due to Yu's belief that for yangbanxi to become successful in educating the masses on the structure and benefits of the new socialist state, the language of the music must be understandable to the common person. He first recommended that the lyrics be written in Mandarin, which was in line with the Chinese government policy that mandated the use of Mandarin as the language of instruction in schools nationwide. Yu also advocated that "the melody should be composed in such a way that it also shadowed the syllabic tonal patterns", which "should sound natural to the ear as well as being easily understandable to the listener."

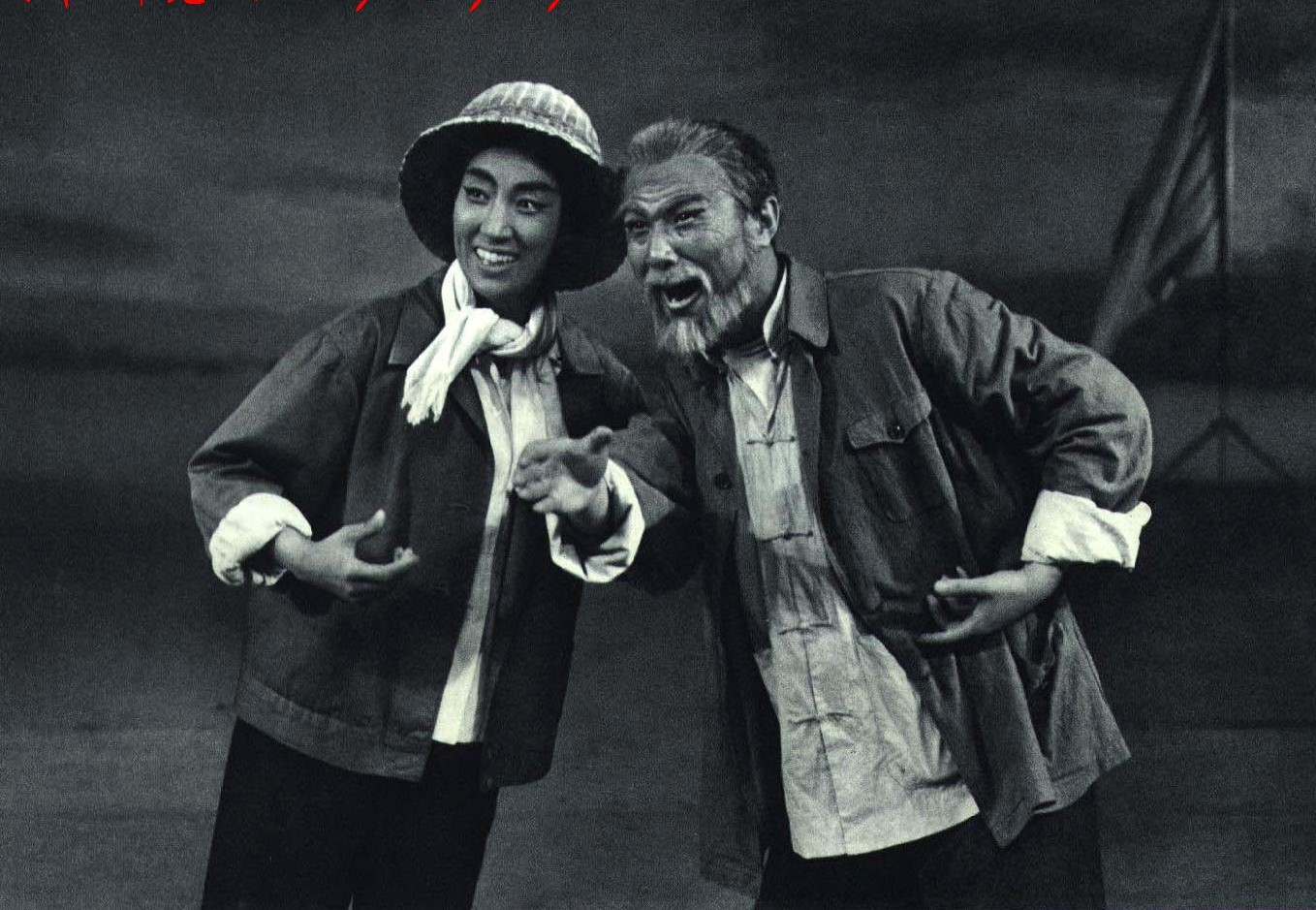
On the Docks in 1967

According to Jiang's theory of the "three prominences," the model revolutionary works were to foreground the principal hero over other heroic characters and positive characters over other characters. Jiang criticised spy thrillers (which were known as counterespionage films) for making the antagonists seem too intriguing. Jiang was known to be blunt in directing the yangbanxi, but Yu was able to serve as the mediator between Jiang and the performers. Since Jiang could not communicate her vision clearly, performers often take her criticisms as personal insults. Du Mingxin, one of Jiang's composers, recalled Jiang dismissed his music in the ballet The Red Detachment of Women (Hong Se Niang Zi Jun) as "erotic ballad that used to be performed in the 1930s Shanghai nightclubs". Du was then criticised for trying to destroy the yangbanxi project by hiding bourgeois music in a revolutionary ballet. Du felt humiliated by this remark. It was until Yu asked the group to submit another composition that Du regained his motivation and composed the now famous Wanquan Heshui (On Wanquan River). According to Du, this incident revealed Yu's artistic integrity, personal courage, and the ability to gain Jiang's acknowledgement on his decisions.

== Personal life ==
=== Family ===
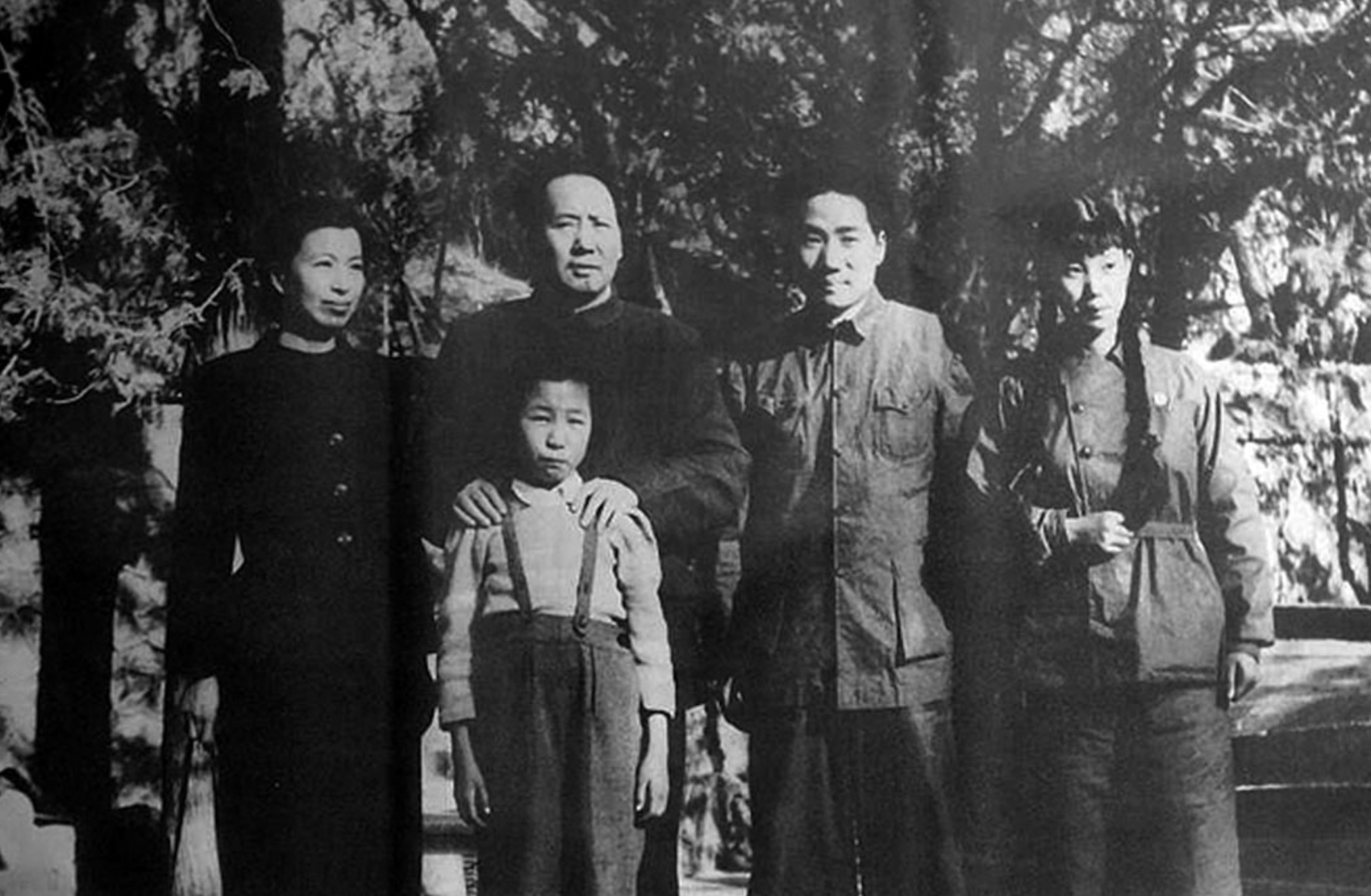
Jiang, Mao, Mao Anying, Liu Siqi and Li Na in 1949

In Mao's later years, he frequently refused to meet Jiang. The two lived apart—Mao resided in Zhongnanhai, while Jiang stayed at the Diaoyutai State Guesthouse—and rarely saw each other. Mao often criticised Jiang and noted in his written comments that "Jiang Qing does not represent me; she represents herself." He once confided to Wang Hairong and Tang Wensheng that Jiang aspired to become the Party Chair. During his interactions with Jiang, Mao advised her to improve her relationships with colleagues who held differing opinions, rather than her small group. He also expressed frustration that she did not study the works of Marx, Lenin, or his own writings. Mao voiced concerns about Jiang's future after his death, fearing that she might face troubles.

She had a daughter with Mao, which was Li Na. Li Na visited her frequently at Qincheng Prison, but they often quarrelled with each other over the husband of Li Na, Wang Jingqing, who once served the Central Security Regiment.

=== Hobbies ===
Jiang's hobbies included photography, playing cards, and holding screenings of classic Hollywood films, especially those featuring Greta Garbo, one of her favorite actresses, even as they were banned for the average Chinese citizen as a symbol of bourgeois decadence. Jiang was able to imitate Mao's handwriting. Her calligraphy was so similar to Mao's that some of her works were even displayed as Mao's manuscripts

Since 1961, Jiang, under the pen names Li Yunhe and Li Jin, had multiple landscape photographs selected for four consecutive National Photography Exhibitions. She became one of the photographers with the most works featured in each exhibition. In terms of lighting techniques, Jiang favoured backlighting and side-backlighting. Her visual style, which emphasised grandeur and completeness, had a significant influence on the photography community in mainland China.

== In popular culture ==
=== Fiction ===
- Jiang and Her Husbands, a 1990 Chinese historical play written by Sha Yexin
- Becoming Madame Mao, a 2000 historical novel by Anchee Min

=== Opera ===
- Nixon in China, a 1987 opera by John Adams - the role of Jiang is sung by a coloratura soprano.

=== Film and television ===
Year	Region	Name	Actress
1976	Taiwan	Fragrant Flower Versus Noxious Grass (Note: The movie version is known as Fragrant Flower Versus Noxious Grass (Chinese: 香花与毒草; pinyin: xiānghuā yǔ dúcǎo), a phrase derived from Mao Zedong’s remarks during the Hundred Flowers Campaign. The TV version is known as the Cold Waves (Chinese: 寒流; pinyin: hánliú). According to the producers, the title draws on a metaphor likening the Chinese Communist Party to cold waves sweeping across China.)	Yao Hsiao-Chang
1993	China	China has a Mao	Zhang An'an
2009	China	The Founding of a Republic	Zhang Erdan
2009	China	The Liberation	Yan Xuejing
2009	Australia	Mao's Last Dance	Yue Xiuqing
2013	China	Mao	Sun Jia

== See also ==
- Cultural Revolution
- Gang of Four

== Notes ==
=== Translation notes ===
Honorary titles
New title	Spouse of the paramount leader of the People's Republic of China; 1949–1976	Han Zhijun
New title also see Spouses of the Presidents of the Republic of China	Spouse of the President of the People's Republic of China; 1954–1959	Succeeded by Wang Guangmei
