= Andrew J. Nathan =

American sinologist (born 1943)

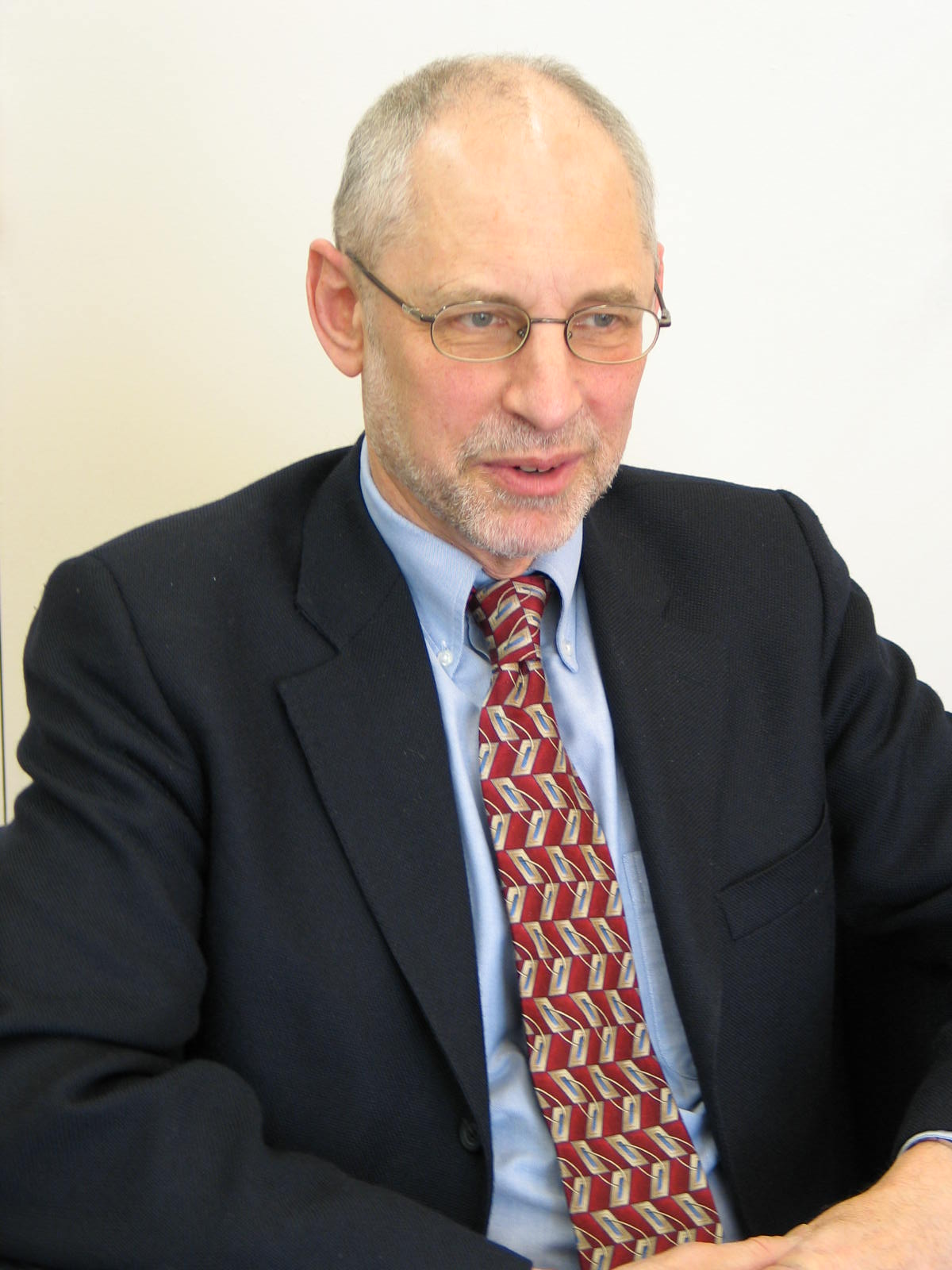
- Born: Andrew James Nathan; April 3, 1943 (age 83); New York City, U.S.
- Education: Harvard University (BA, MA, PhD)
- Occupations: Scholar, writer, professor
- Awards: Berlin Prize (2013)

Chinese name
- Chinese: 黎安友
Transcriptions
Standard Mandarin
- Hanyu Pinyin: Lí Ānyǒu
- Wade–Giles: Li^{2} An^{1}-yu^{3}

Andrew James Nathan (Chinese: 黎安友; pinyin: Lí Ānyǒu; born 3 April 1943) is an American political scientist and sinologist. He is Class of 1919 Professor of Political Science at Columbia University. He specializes in Chinese politics, foreign policy, human rights, and political culture. He has taught at Columbia University since 1971, and currently serves as the chair of the steering committee for the Center for the Study of Human Rights. His previous appointments include as the chair of the Department of Political Science (2003–2006), and chair of the Weatherhead East Asian Institute (1991–1995).

Nathan also serves as an advisor or board member with Freedom House, Human Rights in China, the National Endowment for Democracy and Human Rights Watch Asia and is a member of the editorial boards of the Journal of Democracy, China Quarterly, and the Journal of Contemporary China, among others. He is a participant of the Task Force on U.S.-China Policy convened by Asia Society's Center on US-China Relations.

He was awarded a 2013 Berlin Prize Fellowship at the American Academy in Berlin.

== Life and career ==
Nathan was born in New York City to Paul and Dorothy Nathan. He has a brother, Carl F. Nathan, and a sister, Janet. Nathan attended Harvard University, where he earned a B.A. in history, summa cum laude, in 1963; an M.A. in East Asian studies in 1965; and a Ph.D. in political science in 1971.

Nathan taught at the University of Michigan from 1970 to 1971 before joining Columbia University in 1971, where he has served as Class of 1919 Professor of Political Science. At Columbia, he has held leadership roles including chair of the Department of Political Science (2003–2006), chair of the executive committee of the Faculty of Arts and Sciences (2002–2003), and director of the Weatherhead East Asian Institute (1991–1995). He also chairs the steering committee of the Center for the Study of Human Rights and the Morningside Institutional Review Board (IRB).

Outside academia, Nathan has been involved in human rights and policy advisory roles. He is a member and former chair of the board of Human Rights in China, a former chair of the Advisory Committee of Human Rights Watch, Asia (1995–2000), and a former member of the board of the National Endowment for Democracy. He serves on editorial boards for journals such as the Journal of Contemporary China, China Information, and the Journal of Democracy. Nathan is the regular Asia book reviewer for Foreign Affairs magazine, where he has contributed numerous reviews since 2023. His research has been supported by foundations including the John Simon Guggenheim Memorial Foundation, the National Endowment for the Humanities, the Henry Luce Foundation, the National Science Foundation, the Chiang Ching-kuo Foundation, and the Smith Richardson Foundation.

Nathan's teaching and research interests include Chinese politics and foreign policy, the comparative study of political participation and political culture in Asia, and human rights. He frequently provides interviews and commentary on China-related topics for media outlets. In December 2025, he appeared on the Taiwanese foreign affairs program 下班國際線 by The Storm Media, discussing U.S.-China relations, Taiwan's security, and deterrence strategies.

In 1978, Nathan married historian Roxane Witke. The marriage ended in divorce. He is married to Joanne R. Bauer, co-founder of Rights CoLab and an adjunct professor of international affairs at Columbia University.

== Books ==
- A History of the China International Famine Relief Commission. Cambridge, Massachusetts: East Asian Research Center, Harvard University; Harvard East Asian Monographs, 1965.
- Modern China, 1840-1972: An Introduction to Sources and Research Aids. University of Michigan Center for Chinese Studies (Ann Arbor, MI), 1973.
- Peking Politics, 1918–1923: Factionalism and the Failure of Constitutionalism. Berkeley: University of California Press, Studies on China, 1976.
  - Reprinted: Ann Arbor, Mich.: Center for Chinese Studies, University of Michigan, 1998. ISBN 0520027841.
- Chinese Democracy. (New York: Knopf, 1985). ISBN 039451386X.
- with David G. Johnson and Evelyn Sakakida Rawski, ed., Popular Culture in Late Imperial China. Berkeley: University of California Press, Studies on China, 1985. ISBN 0520051203.
- Human Rights in Contemporary China (1986).
- China's Crisis (1990).
- with Robert Ross, The Great Wall and the Empty Fortress: China's Search for Security (1997).
- China's Transition (1997).
- with Perry Link, The Tiananmen Papers (2001).
- Negotiating Culture and Human Rights: Beyond Universalism and Relativism (2001).
- with Bruce Gilley, China's New Rulers: The Secret Files (2002, second edition 2003).
- Constructing Human Rights in the Age of Globalization (2003).
- How East Asians View Democracy (2008).
- with Robert Ross, The Great Wall and the Empty Fortress, second edition (2009).
- with Andrew Scobell. China's Search for Security. New York: Columbia University Press, 2012. ISBN 0231140509.
