= Tang Na =

Chinese author (1914–1988)

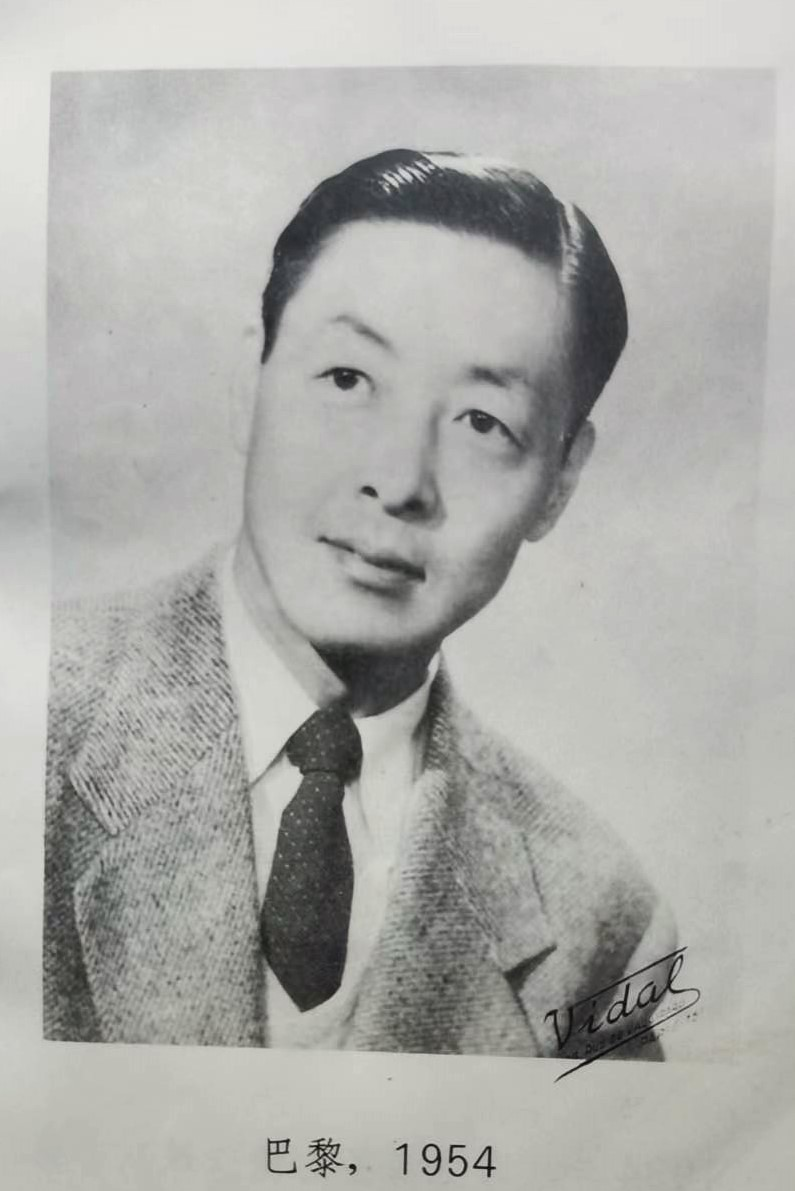
- Portrait of Tang Na in Paris, 1954
- Born: May 7, 1914; Suzhou, Jiangsu, China
- Died: August 23, 1988 (aged 74); Paris, France
- Education: St. John's University, Shanghai
- Spouse: Jiang Qing (m. 1936–1937) Anna Tcheng (m. 1952–1988)

Tang Na
- Traditional Chinese: 唐納
- Simplified Chinese: 唐纳
Transcriptions
Standard Mandarin
- Hanyu Pinyin: Táng Nà

Ma Jiliang
- Traditional Chinese: 馬繼良 馬驥良 馬季良
- Simplified Chinese: 马继良 马骥良 马季良
Transcriptions
Standard Mandarin
- Hanyu Pinyin: Mǎ Jìliáng

Ma Jizong
- Traditional Chinese: 馬繼宗
- Simplified Chinese: 马继宗
Transcriptions
Standard Mandarin
- Hanyu Pinyin: Mǎ Jìzōng

Ma Shaozhang
- Traditional Chinese: 馬紹章
- Simplified Chinese: 马绍章
Transcriptions
Standard Mandarin
- Hanyu Pinyin: Mǎ Shàozhāng

Tang Na (7 May 1914 – 23 August 1988), with birth name as Ma Jizong (馬繼宗), later changed to Ma Jiliang（or Ma Ki-Leung 馬季良）, and most wellknown pen name as Tang Na (唐納), was a Chinese film critic, actor, journalist, playwright and translator. He was ex-husband of Lan Ping in 1936-1937.

== Biography ==
=== Early Life ===
Born in Suzhou to an eminent family of intellectuals, he attended private Suzhou Shude Junior Middle School and Suzhou High School in 1929, under the name Ma Jizong. Following the Mukden Incident in September 1931, the students from Suzhou High School organized many protest activities.Ma Jizong was one of the student activists giving street speeches and fundraising for General Ma Zhanshan. He participated in leftist stage performances, and joining the Suzhou Social Science Study Group, an affiliate organization of the Communist Youth League of China. In early 1932, Suzhou High School suspended classes due to the turmoil of war and did not officially resume until late April; meanwhile the Communist underground network in Suzhou was dismantled in March 1932, the young left-wing Ma Jizong left hometown and moved to Shanghai. In summer 1932, he was admitted to St. John's University, Shanghai, where he went by the name Ma Jiliang (or Ma Ki-Leung).

=== Enter Shanghai Film and Theater Circle ===
Since 1933, he used various pen names, notably Tang Na and Luo Ping (羅平), to write film reviews and critics for the newspapers Shen Bao and Chen Bao. In autumn 1934 he quit university and joined Shanghai YiHua Film Company（藝華影業有限公司, working as a screenwriter. He wrote the lyrics for the songs "Self-Defense Song" and "Saiwai Cunnu ", both composed by Nie Er, for the soundtrack of the National Defense-themed film Flee (逃亡 1934), on which Tang also worked as assistant director. In 1935 he joined Denton Film Company and acted in the film Scenes of City Life (都市風光 1935), as well as working as the editor of the company's semi monthly magazine Denton Gazette (電通半月畫報).

=== Relationship with Lan Ping ===
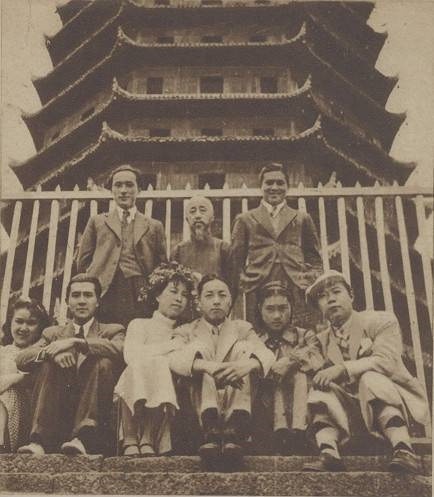
Group wedding on 26 April 1936 in Liuhe Pagoda, Hangzhou, China. Tang Na was seated 4th from left and his bride Lan Ping was to his right. The other newlyweds were Ye Luxi (葉露茜) and Zhao Dan (to Lan Ping's right), as well as Du Xiaojuan (杜小鵑) and actor Gu Eryi (顧而已). Top row included Zheng Junli, Shen Junru, and actor Li Qing (李清).

In Spring 1935, Lan Ping played the main character in Henrik Ibsen's play A Doll's Houseand gained recognition for her performance in Shanghai theater circle， and Tang Na also learnt about her name. Later Lan Ping joined Denton Film Company, acting in film "Spirit of Freedom" (1935) and Scenes of City Life (1935). Tang Na and Lan Ping got to know each other during the film shooting of Scenes of City Life , and soon became lovers and co-lived. (Note: There have not been found any evidence from Republic of China's newspaper archive in the 1930s, that Tang Na ever wrote any article about Lan Ping's first theater hit role "Nora" in Shanghai in early 1935. Yet some people, such as Jiang Qing's biography writer Ye Yonglie 葉永烈 claimed so.) On April 26, 1936, Tang and Lan married in a group ceremony in Hangzhou alongside other celebrity couples, including Zhao Dan and Ye Luxi. The marriage generated significant public interest, with Shen Junru officiating the wedding and Zheng Junli presiding. Later in the same month, when the Shanghai edition of Tai Kung Pao was founded, Tang became an editor for its weekly supplement of film and drama.。On May 5th 1936, the three film couples held a reception in Shanghai Ba Xian Qiao Y.M.C.A. Building.

However, Tang Na and Lan Ping's marriage unraveled soon. In late May, Lan left Shanghai for Jinan to visit her mother, promising to return by June 10. When she failed to come back, she sent a letter falsely claiming that she had died of meningitis. Suspicious, Tang took a train to Jinan, seen off by his friends Zhao Dan and Zheng Junli. However, Lan's family refused to divulge her whereabouts, only stating that she was not in Jinan. Disheartened, Tang attempted suicide in a Jinan hotel by ingesting red phosphorus match heads, but was saved by hotel staff in time. Later, when Lan's sister visited Tang in the hospital, she revealed that Lan had gone to Tianjin to reunite with her ex-husband, Yu Qiwei. This revelation led Tang to write a long letter to Zheng Junli, allegedly exposing Lan's deception and infidelity. This letter would later implicate Zheng during the Cultural Revolution, as he was unable to produce it when Lan, by that time Madame Mao, wanted it destroyed to avoid political consequences.

Lan Ping returned to Shanghai with Tang Na, and both put more emphasis on their work. In august 1936 Tang Na was hired as chief editor for Ta Kung Pao Shanghai edtion's film and theater magazine. In late 1936, Tang Na joined Mingxing Film Company, worked together with Ouyang Yuqian, Yao ke and Lo Duen as script writer. He wrote the shooting script for film "Unchanged Heart in Life and Death"(生死同心 1936）, and promoted the film across various media. Meanwhile Lan Ping joined United Photoplay Service, acting in film Blood on Wolf Mountain(1936), Lianhua Symphony(1937) and "Wang Lao Wu" (王老五 1937).

The relationship between Tang Na and Lan Ping was unstable. In early 1937 Lan moved on with a romantic relationship with theater director Zhang Min（章泯）, who had just left his wife and children to be with her. In end of May 1937, Tang Na was reported to get drunk on the beach of Wu Song Kou, which later was rumored as his second suicidal attempt. In June 1937 Lan Ping published an article titled "Why Tang Na and I Broke Up," claiming she had left Tang for her own physical and mental well-being. After the breakout of Marco Polo Bridge incident, Lan left Shanghai for Yan'an, where she changed her name to Jiang Qing, and after a few whirlwind relationships with other men, married her fourth husband Mao Zedong in 1938.

=== Tang Na during Wartime ===
After breakout of Battle of Shanghai, Tang Na went to the defense front lines along the southeastern coast, and wrote war reports for Shanghai Ta Kung Pao with pen name Luo Ping, and several reports were later collected in Fan Changjiang edited Review of Eastern Front Line (《瞻回東戰場》 1938). Following the fall of Shanghai in end of 1937, Tang relocated to Wuhan. While in Wu Han, he continued to work as journalist for Ta Kung Pao, and due to his English capability, he was interviewing foreign visitors such as British authorW. H. Auden and Christopher Isherwood, who supported China's self defense.

Beside journalist work, he continued working with China's film and theater circle. In early 1938 he joined "China National Film Industry's Anti-Enemy Association"(中華全國電影界抗敵協會), and was the chief editor for the association's magazine "Anti-Japanese War Film"(《抗戰電影》). In May 1938, with the supported by Ta Kung Pao chief editor Zhang Jiluan (張季鸞), Tang Na organized "Ta Kung Theatrical Troupe"(大公劇團）, with which he published theater work "Long Live China" (中國萬歲 1938). The play debut in Wu Han in June 1938, and soon became a major national defense themed work during the wartime.

After the fall of Wuhan in October 1938, Tang Na was recommended by chief editor Zhang Jiluan to work for the Press office of British Embassy, and later became the Chinese assistant for British ambassador Archibald Clark Kerr, and traveled between Shanghai, Chungking and Hongkong. During his diplomatic work time, he used name "Ma Yaohua" (馬耀華). In this period, he helped Shanghai newspaper Wenhui Bao to defeat the buyout attempt by the puppet government led by Wang Jingwei, and delivered important information regards the relation between Britain and Japan to the underground resistant group “Nan Jian She" (南尖社) led by his St.John University mate David Kung Ling-kan. After the Hong kong authority seized the activity of Nan Jian She, Tang Na worked shortly for Sheng Shengyi (盛升頤，son of Sheng Xuanhuai) as trading manager in Yun Nan.

In the end of 1939, Tang Na went back to Shanghai with his new girlfriend actress Chen lu (陳璐). Under the pen name Jiang Qi (蔣旂), he published several theater plays, including Chen Yuanyuan(陳圓圓 1940) and The Road to Life(生路 1940) in the "solitary island" period of Shanghai. He also translated American author Pearl S. Buck short stories collection "Today and Forever: Stories of China" (1941, Chinese version 《永生》published in 1941) , and Chinese writer Lin Yutang English essays collection "With Love and Irony" (1940, Chinese version 《諷頌集》 published in 1941). As Soviet–Japanese Neutrality Pact signed in April 1941 altered the safety conditions in Shanghai International Settlement, Tang Na started to work for magazine "Time"(《時代》雜志) and radio station "Voice of Soviet" (上海"蘇聯呼聲"電臺, with radio call sign XRVN) supported by Soviet since August 1941.

In early 1942, actress friend Ying Yincommitted suicide after failure of rescuing her militant boyfriend Ping Zuren. Tang Na's name was among the contact list after Ying Yin found in danger in the hotel room. After she passed away, Tang Na was helping with her funeral and burial ceremony. He later wrote two articles in 1943 and 1944 to honor Ying Yin as someone dedicated her life to China's film and theater work, and also as a heroine the self defense war.

In early summer 1943, Tang Na left Shanghai, passing through An Hui county Tun Xi (屯溪) controlled by China's national Army and went to Chungking. During his stay in Tun Xi, he published a one-act play "Reunion"(《重逢》1943) in Central Daily News (中央日報Anhui edition). In Chungking, Tang Na worked for British Embassy's press office, and continued working in theater and film circle. He had new girlfriend actress Kang Jian (康健) for a short period of time.

=== Post Wartime ===
After China winning the war in August 1945, Nationalist Party and Chinese Communist Party started negotiations in Chungking. Tang Na was invited by General Zhang Zhizhong to the welcome dinner for Mao Zedong. Mao was surprised to see Tang Na, and briefly greeted him and said "Peace is Precious"(和為貴).

In late 1945, Tang Na was back to Shanghai, and invited by David Kung Lin-kan to be the chief editor of "The China Times" (上海《時事新報》). During this period, he changed name to Ma Jiliang (馬季良), and met his later wife, young journalist Anna Tcheng（陳潤瓊）, daughter of diplomat Tcheng Loh (陳籙). Due to the different opinions towards the tension between KMT and CCP, Tang Na and many of his left-leaning colleagues quit from The China Times in summer 1946, and later he joined Wenhui Bao as chief editor.

=== Oversea Life ===
In Spring 1948, Anna went to New York to work for UNESCO. In September 1948, Tang Na worked briefly as Wen Wei Po Hong Kong edition chief editor. He went to New York and united with Anna in December 1948. During stay in the USA, he worked as advisor for several Chinese newspapers in both New York and San Francisco. In 1950, he published a one-act play "Before Back to Motherland" (回國之前).

In 1951, Anna went to Taiwan for her mother's funeral, and later Tang Na and Anna moved to Paris. In December 1952, they got married. In Paris, Tang Na used the name Ma Shao-Zhang (馬紹章), and the couple partnered with friends to open Chinese restaurants, and the couple has one daughter Ariane (馬憶華). After the cultural revolution ended in 1976, Tang Na visited China three times in the end of 1978, in 1979 and in 1985 respectively. Tang Na's first China visited in December 1978 was kept secret, during which he was received by General Ye Jianying. The public wasn't aware of the trip until newspaper Nanfang Daily published an article regards General Ye's contribution to China's Reform and opening up, with a General Ye meeting with Tang Na's photo attached.

In August 1988, Tang Na passed away in Paris due to lung cancer. In August 1989, a memorial ceremony for him held in Shanghai, with actress Qin Yi as the host. In 1993, Anna published Tang Na's article collection (馬季良（唐納）文集, 華東師範大學出版社，1993). In 2013, Anna passed away in Paris, and the couple buried in Paris together.
