= Sound of Colors =

Sound of Colors may refer to:

- Sound of Colors (book), a 2001 Taiwanese picture book by Jimmy Liao
- Sound of Colors (film), a 2003 film loosely based on Liao's book
- Sound of Colors (TV series), a 2006 TV series loosely based on Liao's book
