= 17th Seoul International Drama Awards =

Award ceremony in 2022

- Sponsored by: Idolchamp; SBA
- Date: September 17–22, 2022
- Location: KBS Hall, Yeouido, Seoul
- Country: South Korea
- Presented by: Seoul Drama Awards Organizing Committee; Korean Broadcasters Association
- Most nominations: Help; The Last Goodbye to Mama

Television/radio coverage
- Network: KBS

The 17th Seoul International Drama Awards (Korean: 제17회 서울 드라마 어워즈) was held on September 17–22, 2022 in Seoul. Organized by the Seoul Drama Awards Organizing Committee and the Korean Broadcasters Association, the event was supported by the Ministry of Culture, Sports and Tourism, the Seoul Metropolitan Government, and major networks including KBS, MBC, SBS, EBS, and CBS, with sponsorship from Idol Champ and SBA. This edition featured 225 entries from 39 countries competing for awards.

== Event ==
Events
Event	Venue	Dates	MC	Notes
Drama OST Concert	KBS	September 17, 2022	Shin Dong-yup	Broadcast as Episode of Immortal Song
Drama Talk Concert	Korean Film Archive	September 21, 2022	Jang Sun-young	Talkshow with Producer Kim Yun-jin of Our Beloved Summer
Red Carpet	KBS Hall, Yeouido	September 22, 2022	MC Bae and Jang Sun-young	
Award Ceremony	KBS Hall, Yeouido	September 22, 2022	Joo Sang-wook and Jung Eun-ji	
Reception	Fairmont Ambassador	September 22, 2022	MC Bae and Jang Sun-young	

== Winners and nominees ==
The nominations for the 20th Annual Seoul International Drama Awards were announced on August 2, 2022. Winners are listed first and denoted in bold.

=== International Competition ===
==== Program ====
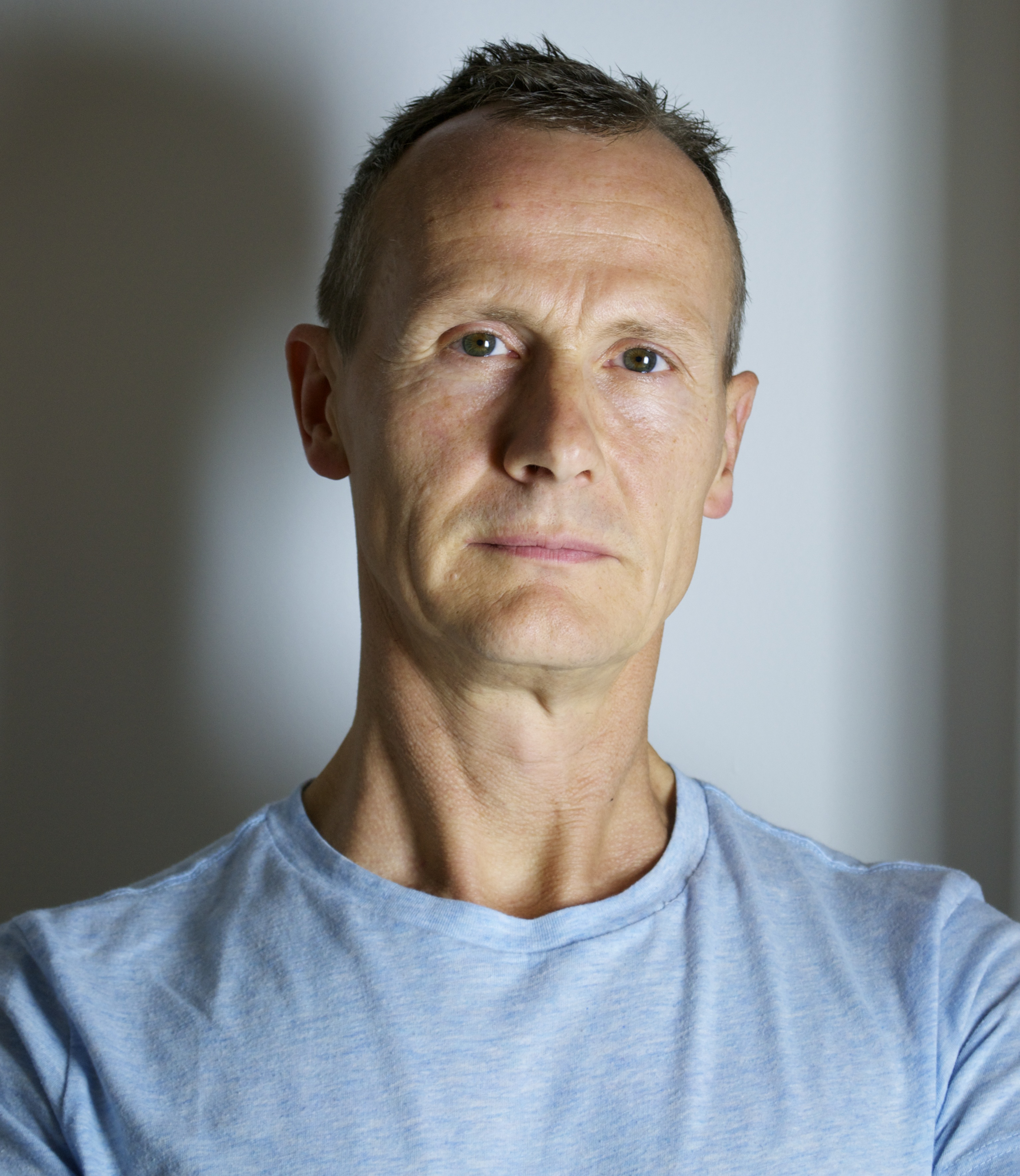
Marc Munden, director of Help

Program
**Grand Prize (Daesang)**: **Help** (All3 Media Intl., U.K.)
**Best TV Movie**: **Nobody's Child** (Newen Connect, France); **Take Me Home** (ZDF Studios GmbH, Germany); (S)he (Newen Connect, France); My Daughter (KBS, South Korea); The World Stands Still (ZDF Studios GmbH, Germany); Emma Bovary (Newen Connect, France); The Winemaker (Beta Film, Germany)	**Best Mini-Series**: **Last Summers of the Raspberries** (Three Oranges, Canada); **Anne** (ITV Studios, Hong Kong); Breaking Point (Beta Film, Germany); Sisi (Beta Film, Germany); Hotel Portofino (Beta Film, U.K.); Jeyran (HA International, Iran); Station Eleven (Paramount, U.S.A.); Thistle (ATRESMEDIA TELEVISIÓN, Spain)
**Best Series**: **Hidden Truth** (MF YAPIM, Turkey); **Destan** (ATV, Turkey); Luoyang (iQIYI, China); The Last Goodbye to Mama (YOUKU, China); Be Reborn (YOUKU, China); The Ideal City (iQIYI, China); Left Right (iQIYI, China); Aziz (INTER MEDYA, Turkey)	**Jury Special Prize**: **The World Stands Still** (ZDF Studio GMBH, Germany)

==== Individual ====
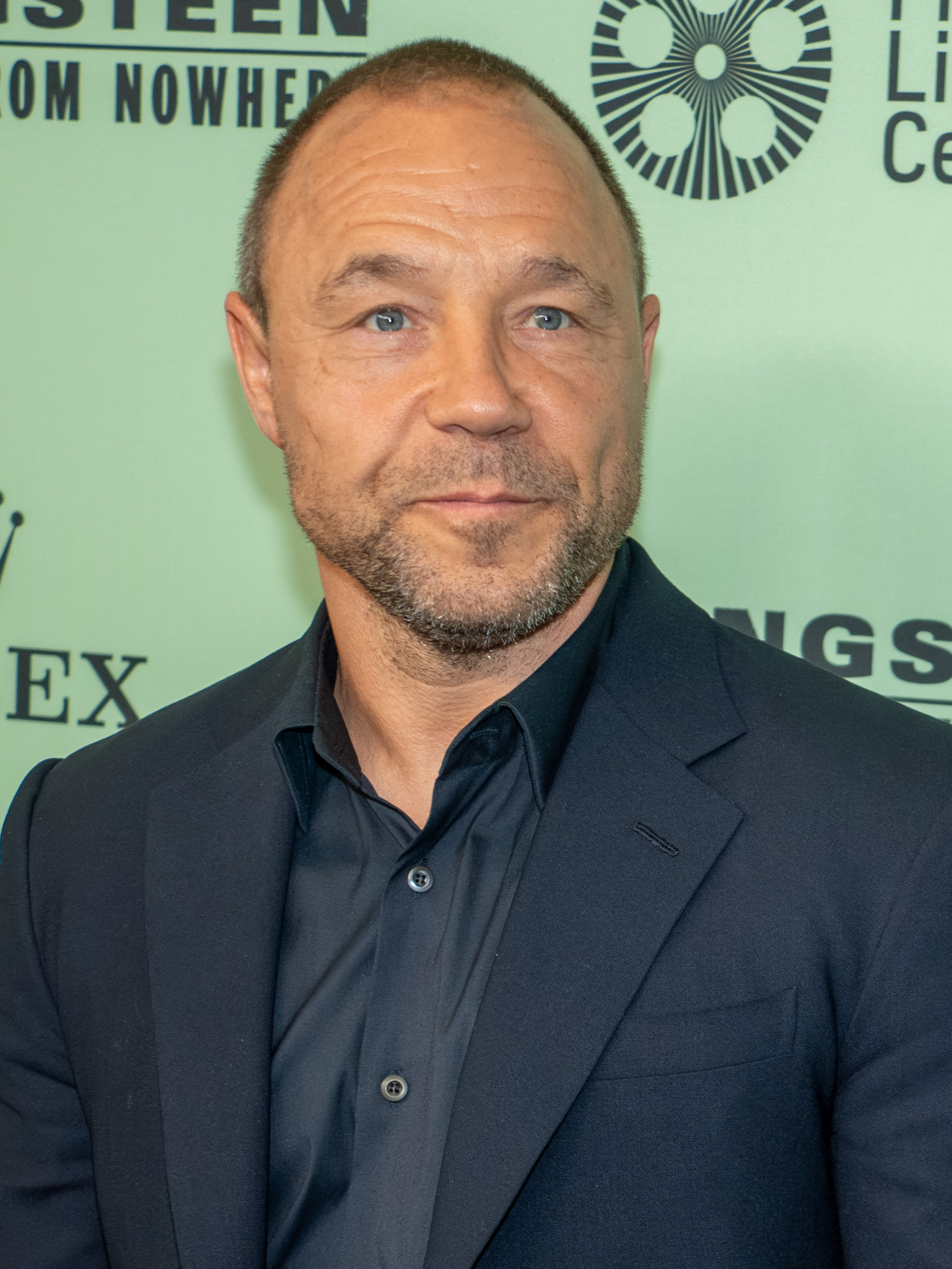
Stephen Graham

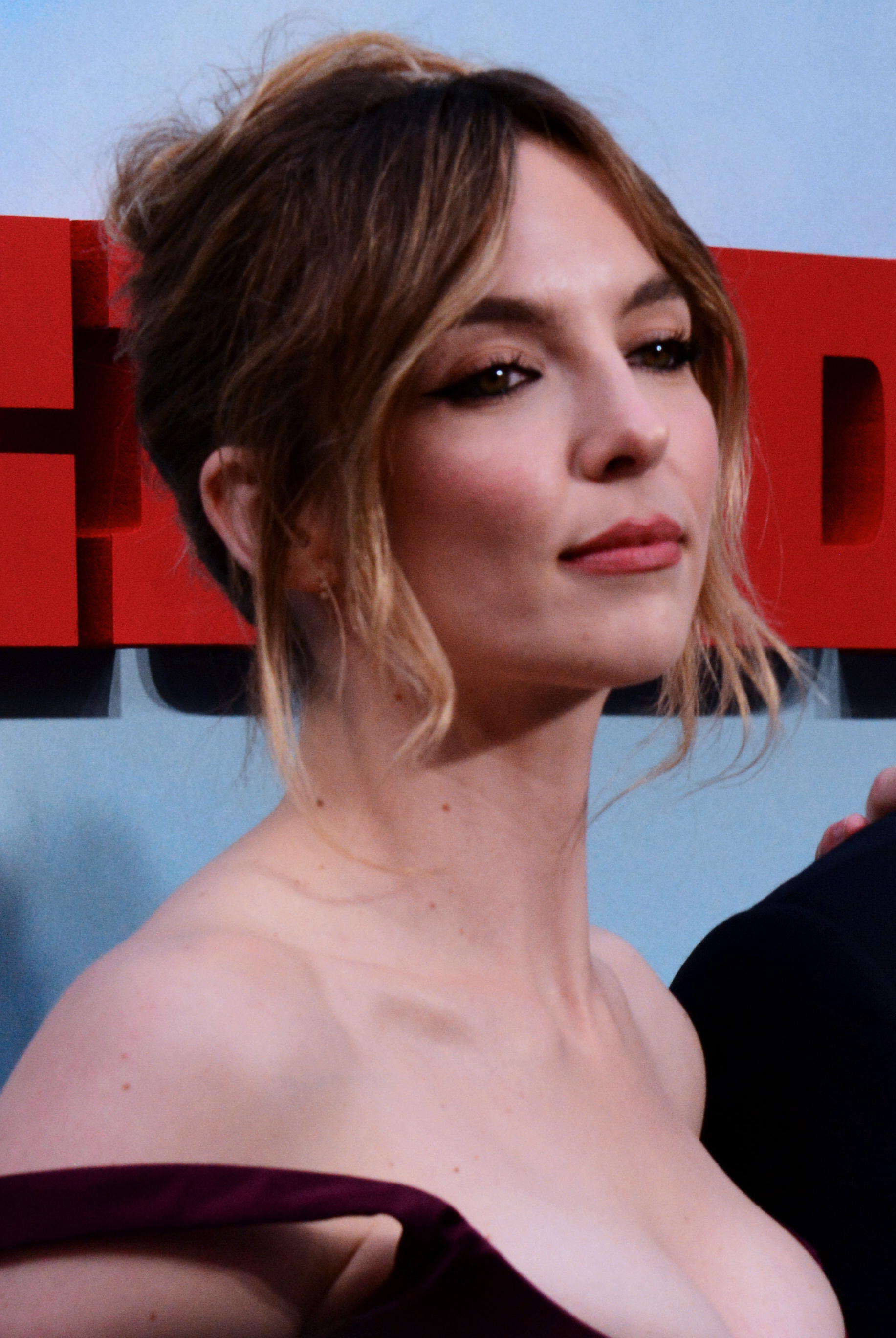
Jodie Comer

Individual
**Best Actor**: **Stephen Graham** (Help - U.K.); Sebastian Koch Your Honour; Kim Nam-gil Through The Darkness; Tobias Moretti The Winemaker; Fang Yin The Last Goodbye to Mama; Murat Yıldırım Aziz	**Best Actress**: **Jodie Comer** (Help - U.K.); Ebru Şahin Destan; Jeon So-min My Daughter; Dong Jie The Last Goodbye to Mama; Burcu Biricik Camdaki Kız; Ana Rujas Thistle; Sandrine Bisson Last Summers of the Raspberries (Le temps des framboises)
**Best Director**: Akim Isker (Nobody's Child (L'enfant de personne - France); Choi Sang-yeol My Daughter (Studio S, South Korea); Sven Bohse Sisi (Beta Film, Germany); Hiro Murai, Jeremy Podeswa Station Eleven (Paramount, U.S.A.); Nadim Güç Chrysalis S2 (MF YAPIM, INTER MEDYA, Turkey); Ben Fong Kids’ Lives Matter (Television Broadcasts, Hong Kong); Natalie Carter, Eve De Castro Emma Bovary (Newen Connect, France)	**Best Writer**: **Han Hee-jung** (The King's Affection - South Korea); Agnes Pluch Breaking Point (Beta Film, Germany); Ugras Gunes Hidden Truth (INTER MEDYA, Turkey); Eda Tezcan Aziz (atv, Turkey); Tobias Moretti The Winemaker (Beta Film, Germany); Stephen Graham Help (All3 Media Intl., U.K.); Sebastian Koch Your Honor (SquareOne Productions, Austria); Dominique Garnier, Zoé Galeron Nobody's Child (Newen Connect, France); Fang Yin The Last Goodbye to Mama (Newen Connect, China)

=== International Invitation: Asian Stars Prize ===
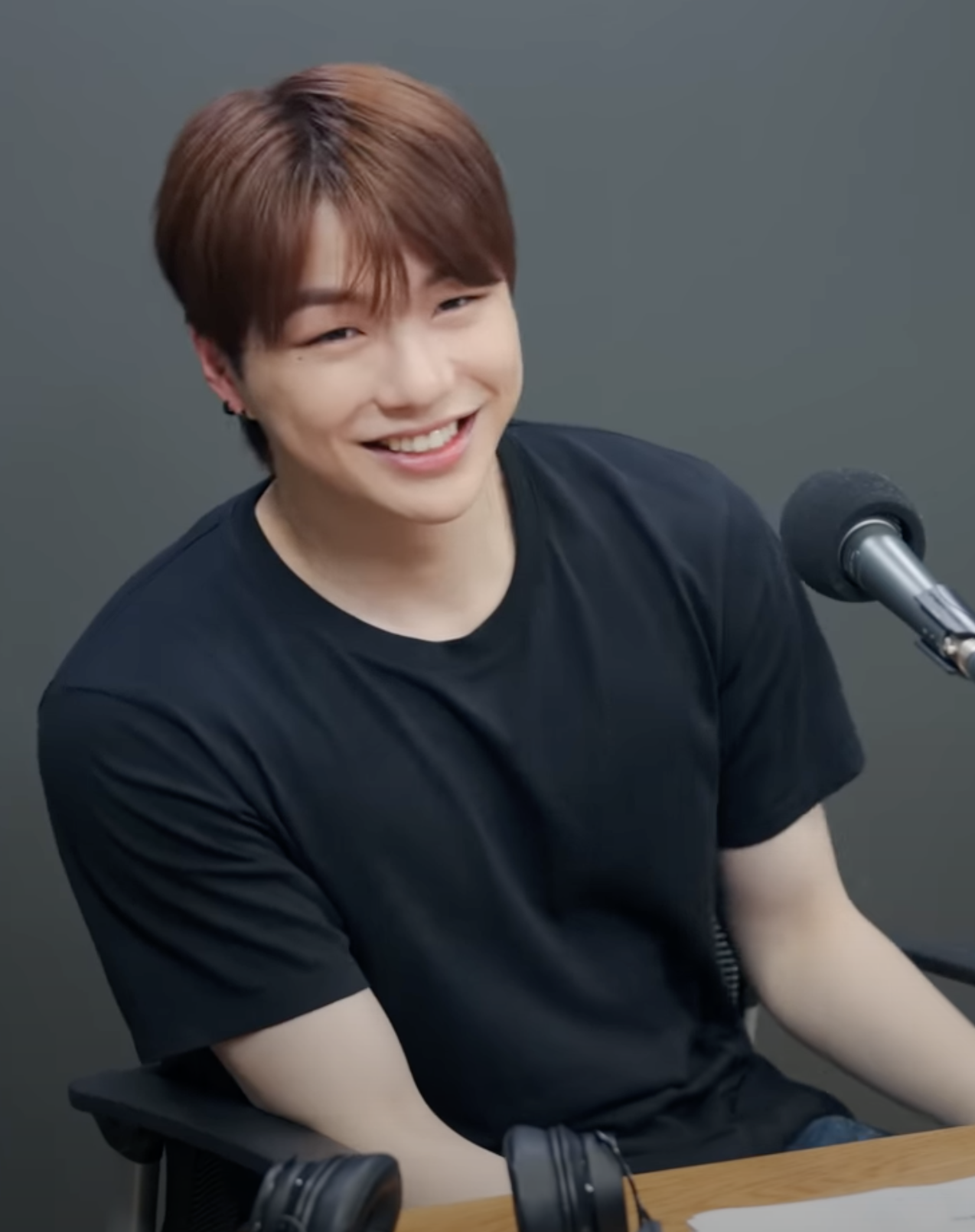
Kang Daniel

Outstanding Asian Star
**South Korea**: Kang Daniel Rookie Cops (Disney+, South Korea)	**China**: Wallace Chung Because of You (Youku, China)
**Japan**: Yusei Yagi My Beautiful Man (Mainichi, Japan)	**Taiwan**: Alice Ko Rainless Love in a Godless Land (Three Phoenixes Production, Taiwan)
**Philippines**: Belle Mariano (Philippines)	**Thailand**: Krit Amnuaydechkorn (Thailand)

=== K-Drama Competition ===
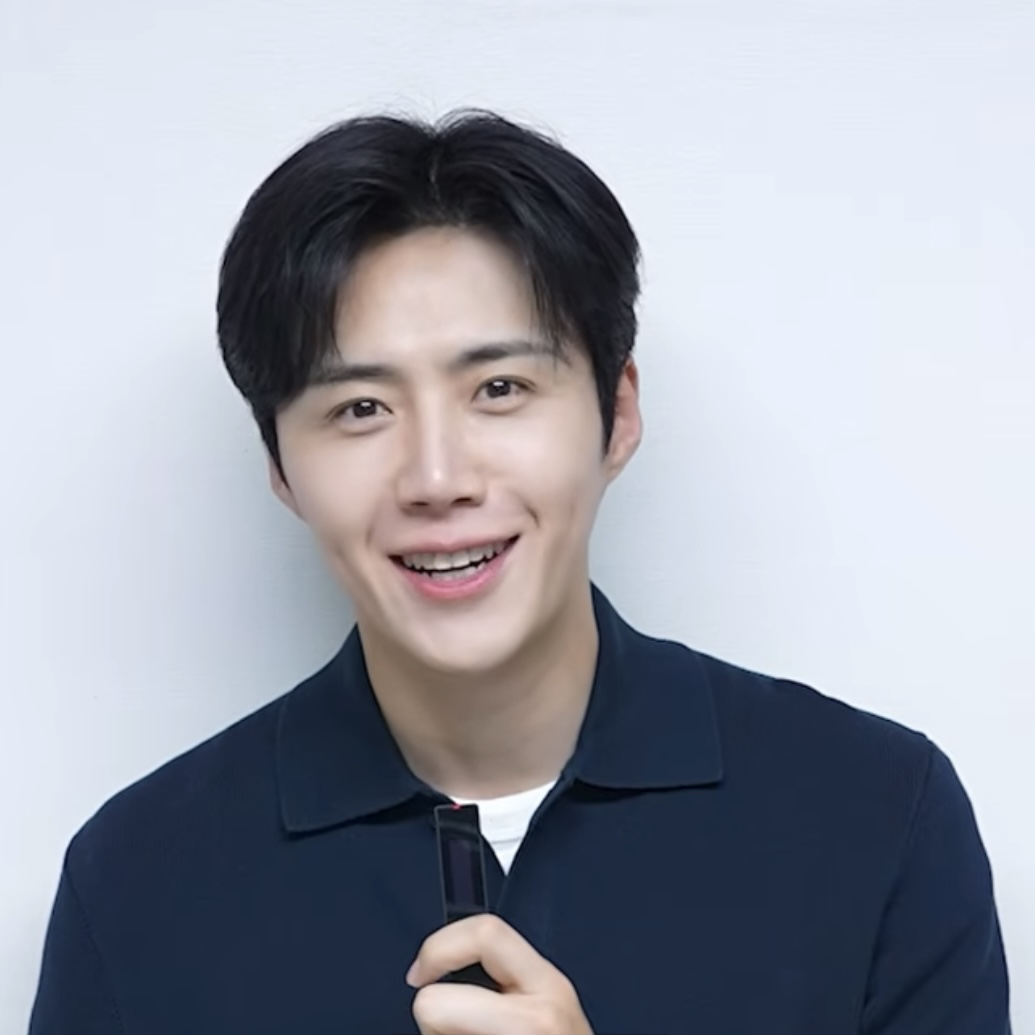
Kim Seon-ho

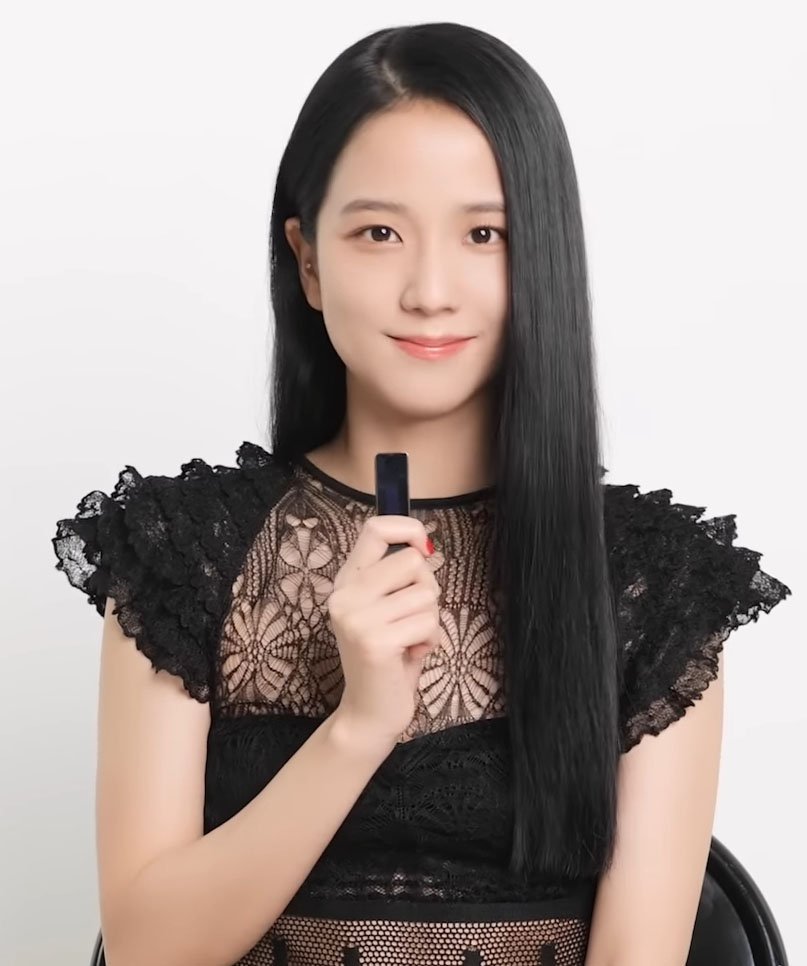
Jisoo

K-Drama Competition Category
**Outstanding Korean Drama**: The Red Sleeve (MBC TV); All of Us Are Dead (Netflix Korea)
**Outstanding Korean Actor (Note: For this edition the winner was determined by voting through Idolchamp)**: Kim Seon-ho Hometown Cha-Cha-Cha (tvN and Studio Dragon)	**Outstanding Korean Actress**: Jisoo Snowdrop (Disney+ Korea)
**Outstanding Korean Drama O.S.T**: Lim Young-woong – "Love Always Runs Away" Young Lady and Gentleman (KBS2 TV)
**Seoul Business Agency Prize (Note: Special award from sponsor)**: Our Beloved Summer (SBS TV)
