= Rex How =

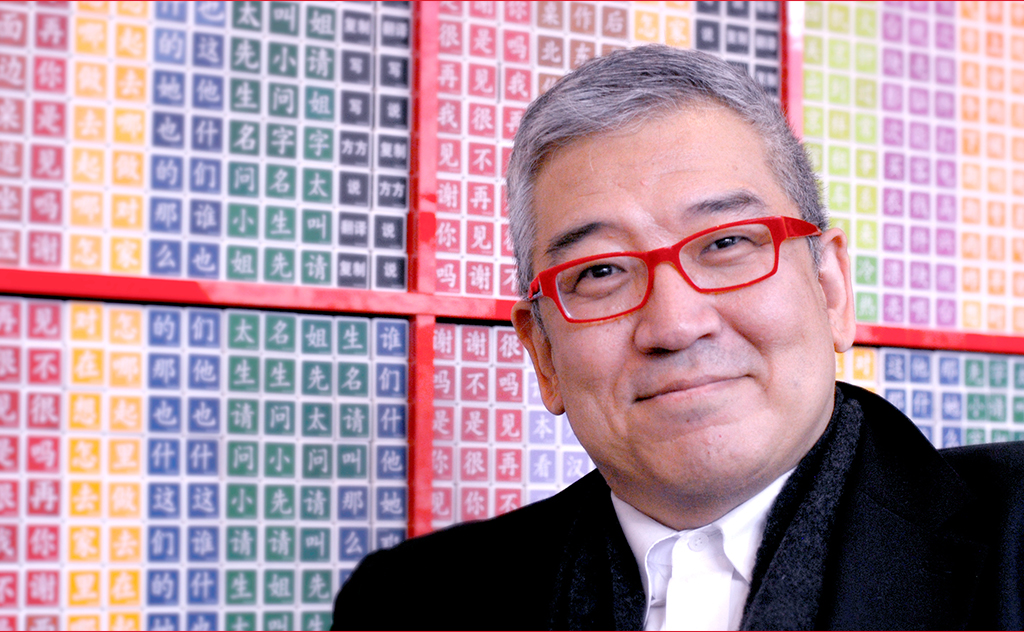
- Born: March 30, 1956 (age 70); Pusan, South Korea
- Education: National Taiwan University (BBA)
- Occupations: Founder and Chairman; ChineseCUBES (2010 – present); Founder and Chairman; Locus Publishing (1996 – present); Founder; Net and Books (2001 – present); National Policy Advisor to the President of the Republic of China (2009–2013)
- Website: rexhow.com

Rex How
- Traditional Chinese: 郝明義
- Simplified Chinese: 郝明义
Transcriptions

Rex How (Chinese: 郝明義, born on March 30, 1956, pen name Ma-Li 馬利) is a Taiwan and Chinese publisher. He is the founder and Chairman of ChineseCUBES, Locus Publishing, and Net and Books.

== Early life and education ==
How was born in Busan Metropolitan City (or Pusan), South Korea in 1956. He attended the Busan Overseas Chinese Elementary, Middle and High School. In 1974, he studied at the National Taiwan University, where he later completed his Bachelor of Business Administration (B.B.A.) degree in International Trade in 1978.

== Career ==
After graduation Rex entered the publishing industry. He started working as a freelance editor, editor, and then the editorial director at Long Bridge Publishing. Later, he became the chief editor of 2001 Magazine, as well as the chief editor of “Productivity Magazine”. In 1988, he joined China Times Media Group (now Want Want China Times Group), where he worked as the President of China Times Publishing Company until 1996. During the eight-year tenure, he oversaw the publication of many bestsellers: The Master series was the first to introduce authors Milan Kundera, Haruki Murakami, and Italo Calvino to Taiwan. Emotional Intelligence, part of the Next series, reached a record high of 700,000 copies sold, and the Brain Turner series reached six million copies sold. The company's Red Novels and Blue Novels series also included best sellers. In addition, he initiated a "picture reading" phenomenon in 1994, by introducing the fully illustrated, pocket-sized encyclopedia Découvertes Gallimard into Taiwan.

In 1989, Rex advocated for and organized the first Taiwan Pavilion exhibit and delegation for the Frankfurt Book Fair. In 1996, as the organizer of the 1996 Taipei International Book Fair (TIBE), he increased the exhibition's scale from the previous year, and established the foundation for future development. Also in 1989, he founded the Sunday Comics. Using the pen name of Ma-Li as the comic playwright, he collaborated with comic artist Chen Uen for the comic, Abi Sword. In 2008, he started publishing the serial novel Abi Sword prelude on his personal website. In addition, during his tenure at China Times Publishing Company, Rex introduced many Japanese comic titles, which included the Complete Manga Works of Tezuka Osamu.

How left China Times Publishing Company in 1996 and founded Locus Publishing Company while also taking on the position of President and Editor-in-Chief at The Commercial Press (Taiwan), Ltd. Publications by Locus Publishing Company included Le Scaphandre et le Papillion and Tuesdays With Morrie, which sold 200,000 and 60,000 copies respectively.

Starting in 2000, Locus published picture books, A Garden In My Heart, Sound of Colors, and The Moments by illustrator writer Jimmy Liao. Later in 2001, Rex founded the website “Net and Books”.

On December 8, 2003, Rex wrote and published an open letter on China Times addressed to Taiwan's publishing industry and the Government Information Office to raise awareness of the importance of Taipei International Book Exhibition. The next year, Taipei Book Fair Foundation (TBFF) was founded and he was appointed the President of the foundation. Rex organized the TIBE from 2005 to 2007.

In 2009, Rex was appointed as a National Policy Advisor to the President of Republic of China, Taiwan. After four years of advising on art, cultural, and social issues, he resigned in 2013.

== ChineseCUBES ==
In 2010, Rex designed a new digital and tactile Chinese language learning system called ChineseCUBES, and founded the company ChineseCUBES. The system uses augmented reality and physical cubes, combined with a holistic approach to learning Chinese. The learning system has won awards in design, education, and technology.

== New York Chinese Character Festival ==
October 2013 Rex founded and co-organized the first Chinese Character Festival in New York with New York University Steinhardt School of Culture, Education, and Human Development. The festival consisted of a month-long of cultural activities, performances, and online contests to give people the opportunity to explore Chinese Characters and Culture.

== Awards and honors ==
In 1996, Rex was named Publisher of the Year 1996 by Kingstone Bookstore. In 2004, China Book Business Report named him among the Most Important Chinese Publishers for the Past Decade (1994–2004). In 2006, he was named Man of the Year by the Book Reviews of China Times Daily, and once again Publisher of the Year by the Kingstone Bookstore.

In 2014, Rex was presented with the Golden Tripod Special Contribution Award for his publishing work in Taiwan.

== See also ==
- 郝明義
- 星期漫畫 Sunday Comics
- High漫畫月刊 High Comics Monthly
- 台北書展基金會 TBFF
- Jmimy Liao
