= Peng Cheng (serial killer) =

Chinese serial killer and dog breeder (1962–1995)

- 鹏程
- Born: 1962; Yinchuan, Ningxia, China
- Died: 25 September 1995 (aged 32–33); Yinchuan, Ningxia, China
- Cause of death: Execution by shooting
- Convictions: Murder x6 Theft
- Penalty: Death

Details
- Victims: 6
- Span of crimes: 1988–1995
- Country: China
- State: Ningxia
- Date apprehended: 1995

Peng Cheng (Chinese: 鹏程; pinyin: Péng Chéng; 1962 – 25 September 1995) was a Chinese serial killer and dog breeder who killed six people in Yinchuan from 1988 to 1995, occasionally with the help of three accomplices. He is best remembered for the fact that he fed some of his victims' remains to his dogs, one of which was featured in the 1993 film An Old Man And His Dog (Chinese: 老人与狗; pinyin: Lǎorényǔgǒu), directed by renowned Chinese director Xie Jin, in which Peng himself was also cast as a body double to lead actor Xie Tian.

Peng and his main accomplice, Shao Xiaodan, would later be jointly convicted of the crimes, for which they were both sentenced to death and executed.

== Early life ==
Peng was born in 1962 in Yinchuan to a family of cadres originating from Jingbian County, Shaanxi. Due to his father's position, he grew up in a relatively privileged background and was well cared for by both of his parents. However, Peng himself proved to be a problematic child, as he was expelled from junior high school for beating a teacher who had scolded him for bullying other children. Through his father's contacts, however, he was given a job at the Lin Ke Forestry Institute, where he proved to be unpopular among his colleagues due to his rude demeanour and overspending. Due to his dissatisfaction with his salary, Peng would eventually start stealing various items from his workplace.

In 1982, he was arrested for stealing a TV and sentenced to two years imprisonment, since his father refused to bail him out despite having the money to do so. After his release in 1988, he was allowed to return to work, but due to his parents' demands, he was forced to marry a college student who was a year older than him in May of that year. This was done ostensibly so his new wife could possibly change his behaviour, but due to the nature of her work, she was rarely at home, allowing Peng to do whatever he wanted most of the time.

In mid-August, he went on a three-day trip to Lanzhou, and while riding the train back home, he noticed 24-year-old Ms. Hu, a native of Shizuishan who was visiting some relatives in Yinchuan. He engaged her in conversation. After arriving at their destination, he gave her his phone number and left. Eventually, the pair started dating, with him taking advantage of the fact that his wife was away from home most of the time. However, as their relationship deepened, he began to plan her demise.

== Crimes ==
=== First murder ===
After spending the night with Hu at his house, Peng began to worry that his wife might return home soon and thus urged his mistress to leave. She was still sleepy and overall unconcerned about the problem, preferring to do her makeup instead, with Peng's complaints just angering her. At some point, he noticed a pipe wrench placed behind the door, and while Hu was not looking, he picked it up and hit her on the head, killing her instantly. In order to get rid of the body, he removed the clothes and then placed the body in the bathtub, where he dismembered it with a machete and then buried the remains in the backyard, and burned the clothes.

=== Formation of gang ===
Following Hu's murder, Peng developed an interest in dog breeding, buying a large fence around his and later his neighbour's yards, which served as an impromptu dog farm where he kept between 20 and 30 different wolfdogs. However, due to the expensive nature of this hobby and the low wage he earned at his job at the forestry institute, he came to the conclusion that the quickest way to make money was to organize a small gang and start robbing various establishments.

The first person he recruited was his cousin, Shao Xiaodan, who had coincidentally been hired as a temporary worker at the Lin Ke Forestry Institute. When approached with the offer, he immediately accepted, and the two men now planned on how to acquire firearms. Eventually, he learned that on 18 October 1990, a subsidiary of the institute had bought a batch of products he believed to be weaponry, so he and Shao snuck inside one of the warehouses and searched through a few of the boxes before locating one that stored several shotguns. They took eight of the shotguns and brought them back to Peng's house, where they sawed off the barrels and stocks of two of the weapons to make them easier to carry, while the remaining six were hidden on the roof of a shed. In order to practice his aim, Peng would shoot at chickens and ducks in the courtyard, whose corpses he would later use as food for his dogs. As he did this often, his neighbours had grown used to it, which would aid him in some of the later murders.

For the next few months, Peng and Shao stole small items around the institute, mostly consisting of food, furniture, plants, and occasionally money, all of which amounted to around 10,000 yuan. Eventually, he started searching for more accomplices. In December 1990, he found a potential candidate in his younger friend, Yu Dawei, an employee of the Yinchuan Great Wall Trading Company who complained that his manager, Mr. Li, was withholding a big payment of money. Utilizing this, he promised Dawei that he would help him and would collect the debt from Mr. Li. After Dawei left, he started planning a way for him and his accomplices to acquire a car.

=== Murder of Mr. Yang ===
On 22 December 1990, he and Shao took their shotguns and went to the train station, where they planned to select a driver who would drive them to Mr. Li's offices, then kill the driver and steal his vehicle. In the end, they found their target in a man named Yang, who drove a white minivan. Peng approached him and asked whether he could drive them to a casino in Yongning County, to which he agreed. Yang then drove them to a kiln farm, where Peng asked him to stop, ostensibly to go to the toilet, but Yang said it would be better to stop at a public toilet further along the road. At that moment, Peng winked at Shao, indicating that he should shoot him, but owing to his nervousness, he missed the shot and instead hit one of the car doors, knocking it wide open.

To their benefit, Yang thought that the noise came from a flat tire and stopped to check it, finding a small bullet hole in the door instead. At that moment, Peng shouted that somebody was shooting at them, making the frightened man jump back right into the car and drive away at full speed. Eventually, at Peng's request, Yang drove them back to the former's house, where he was invited to have some tea. On his suggestion, Yang entered first, giving an opportunity for Shao to take out his shotgun and shoot him in the back of the head, killing him on the spot. They then dragged the body to one of the room's corners, wrapped it up in a canvas, and drove to Dawei's house to pick him up, but as he was not home at the time, they drove back to his house.

Once they returned, the two men took off their victim's clothes and then dismembered his body with machetes, some parts of which Peng fed to his dogs. The remaining parts were put in a sack, which they planned to bury in an isolated area in Xishawo, but as the pair grew afraid that somebody would find the remains, they abandoned this idea. Instead, Peng and Shao dug a hole in the backyard and buried the remains there, leaving only the clothes and Yang's head, which Peng disposed of in the institute's boiler room. And since the minivan had been damaged, the pair decided it would be best to get rid of it, with both of them driving to a parking lot in Yinchuan, where they abandoned it and left.

=== Murder of Mr. Zhang ===
For about half a month after the murder, he and Shao laid low to avoid any possible inquiries from the police. On 8 January 1991, Dawei visited Peng to ask him if he was ready with the payments, to which, after treating his guest to dinner, he said that they would go to Mr. Li and ask for the money. After finishing their meals, he called Shao, and the three travelled to the Nanmen bus station. There, the trio entered the beige FSO Polonez taxi of a man named Zhang, who immediately started driving them to the Yinchuan nursery farm. After approaching the area and confirming that there was nobody around, Peng asked him to pull over.

Unbeknownst to Zhang, Shao had been aiming at his head, but the sudden brake made him lose balance and miss his shot, punching a hole through the car's windshield. This frightened Zhang, who quickly got out of the car and started running away, shouting that they were attempting to kill him. Panicked that they were going to get caught, the trio got out of the car and started chasing him, with Peng firing several shots in Zhang's direction, making him slow down and allowing his pursuers to catch up with him. Zhang then knelt and begged for them to spare him, only for Peng to sneer at him and hand over his gun to Dawei, instructing him to kill the man so they would not leave any witnesses. Dawei instead handed the gun back to him, with he then shooting Zhang in the head.

Afterwards, he took out a knife and said to Dawei that he needed to help dismember the body, which he refused, claiming he could not stomach it. Instead, the trio stuffed the corpse into the trunk of the taxi and then set course for Mr. Li's trading company. On the way Dawei, realizing that Peng would likely kill Mr. Li if they found him, said to his accomplices that it was way too early and he might not be there. Because of this Peng and Shao drove back to the former's house, where they let him off with the warning not to tell anyone about what had happened. He and Shao then drove to Xishawo and buried Zhang's body in the sand, but on the way back, Peng thought it would be better to just feed the remains to his dogs. And so, they turned around and returned to the burial site, where they unearthed the corpse and took it to Peng's house and threw some of the remains to the dogs, while the rest were buried in the backyard. Since the corpses were beginning to pile up, Peng put a layer of concrete over the locations where he buried the remains.

After disposing of the remains, Shao asked him what they should do with the car, to which the latter replied that it would be better to get rid of it since it was damaged. The pair subsequently drove the taxi to the Dongfeng Bath House, where they abandoned it at the parking lot and left. As time passed, Dawei started gradually distancing himself from Peng until he eventually broke off contact with him altogether. This did not concern him, however, as he believed Dawei would be too intimidated to inform the police of their actions and let him off without any issues.

=== Murder of Ms. Liu ===
Sometime circa the winter of 1991, Peng was dancing at the Tongfuju Ballroom when he noticed a young woman, who was also dancing. Her name was Ms. Liu, a cotton factory worker in her early 20s. Peng approached her. They agreed to meet up the next evening at the ballroom. On the following night, the pair met up again and spent the night together.

After this, Peng took her out for dinner before proposing that they go to his house, to which Liu agreed. For an indeterminate amount of time later, the pair began an affair. Liu then revealed that her family was actually helping her find a partner whom she could marry, but as they had no money, she searched for somebody who appeared rich so he could pay some of the wedding costs, amounting to about 3,000 yuan. Peng asked for ten days to gather the money. Liu accepted his proposal.

When the agreed day came, Peng invited Liu to his house. After spending the night together, they got up in the early morning, and while she was putting on her makeup on the table, Peng grabbed one of his shotguns and shot her in the head. He then stripped Liu of her clothing, tied a rope around her neck, and dragged her body to the neighbour's yard, where he left it to be devoured by his dogs. After checking on it three days later, he found nothing except the head, some leftover bones, and the rope. Shortly afterwards, Peng threw the head into the boiler room, buried the bones in the backyard, and burned the clothes.

=== An Old Man And His Dog and murder of Mrs. Yu ===
In March 1993, Chinese film director Xie Jin and his film crew settled on Zhenbei Fort in Ningxia as the filming location for his newest film, An Old Man and His Dog. However, he struggled with finding a dog suitable for the project, and so, the film crew published an ad in the local newspapers and on the TV that they were searching for any puppies that could fit the role. While many people applied for the offer, Xie proved to be demanding and frequently rejected the applicants, until he eventually came across Peng and one of his dogs, which he immediately approved. On his instructions, Peng was allowed to stay on set and help his dog perform in some of the scenes, with the payoff that he was cast as a body double for the main actor, Xie Tian, being filmed in some of the scenes in which the protagonist rides on horseback.

After the film's release, it proved to be a commercial success in China and won several awards, leading to further interest being drawn to Peng as a dog breeder. As a result, many customers came to his farm to either observe or buy some of his dogs: one of these people was a woman named Mrs. Yu, a married woman who was seven years older than Peng and had been part of the film crew for An Old Man And His Dog. The two soon started an affair. At some point, Peng gave her a spare key and told her she could visit him any time she wanted, so long as his wife was not at home.

In April 1994, Yu called Peng to ask if she could visit him the next day. As they had not seen each other for a long time, since Yu's father had died and she had to return to attend his funeral in her native Hebei, Peng accepted her offer. On the next day, the pair met up, dined at a high-end restaurant, and then went to a karaoke hall, before eventually returning to Peng's house. After having sex, Yu suddenly revealed to him that she was pregnant and the child was likely his. She was unaware that Peng did not want to have children with anyone else besides his wife, and upon being informed of this, he immediately started making plans to get rid of her.

On the following morning, while Yu was putting on makeup, Peng got one of his shotguns and shot her in the back, leaving her to bleed out on the floor while looking at him. Unlike his previous victims, he did not dismember her remains and instead buried her whole body in his backyard. He burned some joss paper on top of the grave as a last send-off.

=== Final murder ===
Approximately a month after Yu's murder, Peng was unexpectedly visited by a man wearing glasses and riding a bicycle. While he was initially confused about who the man was, he introduced himself as an old classmate from junior high school, Ma Wei. According to Ma, he had heard from friends that Peng was in the dog breeding business, and since he had recently bought ten Tibetan Mastiffs which he did not really know how to train, he came to him for advice. Peng agreed, and after Ma left, he realized that this specific breed of dog was sold for a lot of money. He called Shao and informed him of the new money opportunity, with the latter agreeing to help him out.

On the next day, Shao visited Peng and the pair began waiting for their target, but when Ma arrived, they were shocked to realize that he was a police officer. While both men contemplated luring him into the house and killing him right there, Peng indicated that it was a bad idea and let Ma live. After this incident, he helped several additional people in the dog breeding business. This caught the attention of two former classmates, Zhang Ming and Mr. Wang, who were the manager and deputy manager of a trading company situated in Yinchuan. At first, Zhang approached him under the pretence of helping him raise some dogs, but later on, he let Peng into a business opportunity relating to buying cashmere wool for 1.5 million yuan. Peng agreed but Zhang asked to be given some time to gather the money, to which Peng agreed.

Another person who approached Peng because of his business was another old classmate, Li Sanwei, an employee at the local nitrogen fertilizer factory. The two eventually became close friends, and after listening to Li complain about his low wage for some time, Peng asked him if he was willing to be recruited for a quick money-making scheme. Li then said that as long as it would make money, he was willing to do anything, and immediately agreed. Zhang soon informed him that he had managed to gather the 1.5 million yuan and that the money was at his house. He offered Zhang to visit him one day so they could make the deal.

On 7 January 1995, Peng invited Li and Zhang to his house to have dinner. After eating, he prepared strong tea laced with sleeping pills and gave it to Zhang, who soon faded into unconsciousness. As an initiation ritual, he gave a shotgun to Li and told him to kill Zhang, but Li refused and returned the shotgun. Peng then shot Zhang in the head, killing him instantly. The pair then dragged his body to the backyard and buried it hastily, before they travelled to his house to get the money. To Peng's surprise, however, he only found a few hundred yuan. Believing that Zhang had likely hidden it somewhere, he thought of asking his wife, but as asking directly would make it seem suspicious, he thought up a plan to extract information from her.

== Investigation and flight ==
On the following evening, Peng went to a payphone and called Zhang's house. When his wife answered, he pretended to be an anonymous business partner and explained the situation, but Zhang's wife said that she knew nothing of the money and told him to ask her husband. After finishing the call, Mrs. Zhang became worried and called Mr. Wang to ask him where her husband was. Wang said that he had not seen him for the past two days and that when he called him on his telephone, he was surprised to hear that it was not Zhang, but Peng who answered, claiming that he had been given the phone by Zhang himself.

After hearing this, Mrs. Zhang felt that she had heard the name Peng before, realizing that it was her husband's old classmate, who was also likely the same person who had called her on the phone. She pondered on the situation for the next few days, before eventually contacting the police to file a missing person report. After describing the strange circumstances that had occurred, the authorities immediately started investigating Peng. Upon learning that Peng was also the last person to have seen Zhang alive, he was summoned to the police station on 16 January for questioning. Peng explained in a calm and collected manner that Zhang had gone to Yunnan to sell drugs with his relatives, who were operating out of Lanzhou, and that he had borrowed 3,000 yuan and the telephone from him.

Peng's claims were investigated, and while police confirmed that Zhang did have a relative living in Lanzhou, the relative chuckled and said that he would never engage in such a thing. When he was questioned as to Zhang's whereabouts, he said that he did not know, as he had not visited Lanzhou for quite some time. While they had caught him in a lie, authorities did not have enough evidence to charge Peng with anything at this time, which was further complicated when he suddenly became uncooperative and went on a hunger strike.

Two days later, police officers took Peng back to his house to check for clues. Since he was not considered a suspect at this time, he was not handcuffed and was allowed to roam freely under supervision. When they arrived at the house, he informed them that he had to go and lock up his dogs, which the officers permitted. Upon entering the yard, Peng jumped on top of the kennel and onto the roof, before jumping down and fleeing the area. This act was seen by the officers, but as they were unfamiliar with the property's layout and were blocked off by the dogs, they were unable to catch him.

Nonetheless, authorities continued to investigate the house, finding numerous incriminating items inside. Among them was a large number of shotguns which, upon checking the serial numbers, were found to be the shipment of weaponry that had disappeared from the forestry institute five years ago. Upon closer inspection, they also found bloodstains on the roof, door, and on a lampshade, which were immediately sent back for identification. The subsequent results showed that it was human blood, and shortly after, an excavation team was sent to the house to dig up the backyard. Upon doing so, the police uncovered several bundles of human remains, all belonging to different people.

=== Fugitive ===
After unearthing the remains, the authorities put out an arrest warrant for Peng, whilst at the same time investigating whether he had any possible accomplices. Soon after, people close to Peng informed officers he was almost inseparable from his cousin, Shao Xiaodan, who by that time had fled to Shenzhen, where he hid with some relatives. With cooperation from local police, Shao was quickly arrested and extradited to Ningxia on 29 January. Under police interrogation, Shao quickly confessed involvement in the murders of two taxi drivers and the stealing of the guns, additionally implicating Yu Dawei, who was subsequently arrested days later.

In the meantime, he travelled westward along the Yingu Highway, attempting to avoid any police roadblocks in his way. He eventually came across a school for students with disabilities, which was currently empty due to the winter vacation. For the following ten days, he hid in a heating ditch inside the school, surviving by eating food from the canteen and drinking tap water. Afterwards, using some of the money he kept on his person, he bought an old hat and cotton-padded jacket from a farmer and continued walking along the Yingu Highway, where he saw a wanted poster on a telephone pole that displayed his face. He then flagged down a passing farmer riding a bicycle, claiming that he was from Lanzhou and had just been cheated out of a large sum of money, but was unable to return home due to his weak legs. The farmer gave him a ride to the nearest bus station, where he got on a bus bound for Otog Front Banner in Inner Mongolia.

He eventually found himself in Otuokeqianqi, where he checked into a local motel under the name "Bai Baoshan", which was coincidentally the name of an unrelated serial killer who would be arrested a year later. No known connection has been established between the two men, and this is thought to be a coincidence. He soon moved to Uxin Banner, where he eventually found a small restaurant operated by Mr. Xu and his son. He repeated the previous lie he had told to the farmer, with Mr. Xu allowing him to stay the night, instructing him that he had to leave the day after, as he wanted to visit his family for the Chinese New Year.

After wandering the bus station, he eventually befriended the watchman, Lao Zhengtou. After hearing his made-up story, Lao introduced him to a local witch doctor, who took him in as an apprentice for the next two months. In addition to assisting the witch doctor, he also worked in the local coal mine and did odd jobs.

On 10 March, he burgled the local police station in search of a weapon, but only found a pistol magazine and several ID cards. After finding a picture that looked similar to him, he burned the remaining ID cards and fled. On 19 and 20 March, he broke into two government offices but again found only a few bullets and magazines. Eventually, an oilfield excavation team from Ningxia came to Otuokeqianqi to do some excavation work and fearing that they would recognize him, he fled Inner Mongolia for Jingbian County in Shaanxi, on the pretence that he wanted to "drink water and eat food from his hometown."

After spending two days in Jingbian County, he returned to Yinchuan by car. Since he could not go back to his house, he thought of returning to the school but abandoned the idea after finding that the heating ditch had been turned off. After staying for another two days, he drove to Pingliang, where he checked into a hotel using one of the stolen identities and stayed there for another ten days. Eventually, he decided to travel to the Weiyang District in Xi'an, where he attempted to find his nephew, who had recently opened a sand manufacturing factory.

== Arrest and trial ==
After eventually finding his way to his nephew's factory, he went to the offices and introduced himself to the man present there. The man turned out to be a distant relative whom he did not know personally, and who informed him that the nephew was currently away on business and he should wait for him to come back. While he was treated to a cup of tea and some cigarettes, the relative suddenly realized that the man he had seen on the wanted poster a few days ago was actually him. After contemplating whether he should turn him in or not, he told a security guard to inform the police while he kept him distracted.

When members of the local police station were informed of the situation, six officers were dispatched immediately to the factory to arrest the fugitive. Upon arriving, they dressed up in plain clothes, pretended to be customers, and entered the offices. When they saw that he was not paying attention, two of the officers pushed him to the ground and immediately arrested him.

At the subsequent trial, Peng, Shao, and Dawei were all charged with first-degree murder. During the proceedings, he confessed to his crimes and bragged that they would never find all the body parts since he had fed them to his dogs. Before a verdict could be reached, several interviews were conducted with him, during which he expressed no remorse for his crimes and said that his victims, especially the women, deserved to be killed for interfering with his family matters. When asked by a reporter if he was terrified of the remains buried in his backyard, he replied, "I don't believe in ghosts and gods!"

== Execution and aftermath ==
On 27 September 1995, both Peng and Shao were sentenced to death, while Dawei was given a suspended death sentence, with all three defendants being deprived of their political rights for life. Immediately after the pronunciation of the sentence, Peng and Shao were brought to the execution grounds in Yinchuan, where they were summarily shot.

In the aftermath of the executions, all of his dogs, including the one which starred in An Old Man And His Dog, were forcefully put down. Due to the notoriety surrounding the film, it was banned for more than two decades before the ban was rescinded sometime during the 2010s.

== See also ==
- List of serial killers in China
