= The Moon Bus =

Art installation in Taipei, Taiwan

- 月亮公車
- Artist: Jimmy Liao
- Year: 2014
- Type: Installation art
- Location: Xinyi, Taipei, Taiwan

The Moon Bus (Chinese: 月亮公車), also known as Jimmy's Moon Bus, is an installation art in Xinyi District, Taipei, Taiwan. It was based on Taiwanese illustrator Jimmy Liao’s 1999 storybook When the Moon Forgot. From the outside, it looks like a normal bus, but head inside there are characters and scenes from Liao's children's books.
