= Cheng Peng =

Cheng Peng may refer to:

- Peng Cheng, Chinese pair skater
- Cheng Peng (serial killer), Chinese serial killer
