= Qiu Jin (film) =

1983 Chinese biographical film

- Film poster
- Traditional Chinese: 秋瑾
- Simplified Chinese: 秋瑾
- Hanyu Pinyin: Qiū Jǐn
- Directed by: Xie Jin
- Written by: Huang Zongjiang; Xie Jin
- Based on: Xia Yan; Ke Ling
- Starring: Li Xiuming; Li Zhiyu; Chen Xiguang
- Cinematography: Xu Qi; Zhang Yongzheng
- Edited by: Chen Weiku
- Music by: Ge Yan
- Production company: Shanghai Film Studio
- Distributed by: Shanghai Film Studio
- Release date: 1983
- Running time: 136 minutes
- Country: China
- Language: Mandarin

Qiu Jin (Chinese: 秋瑾), also known as Qiu Jin: A Revolutionary, is a 1983 Chinese biographical film co-written and directed by Xie Jin, starring Li Xiuming as the revolutionary Qiu Jin. The film also features Li Zhiyu, Chen Xiguang, Yu Shizhi, Wang Fuli, Huang Meiying, Cong Shan, Zhang Kezhong, Wu Wenlun, and Shi Weijian in supporting performances. The film based on the real life of Qiu Jin, focusing on her efforts in the 1900s to overthrow the corruption Qing Empire. The film was released in 1983 in China.

In 1984, the film won two Golden Rooster Awards including Best Supporting Actor and Best Props.

== Cast ==
- Li Xiuming as Qiu Jin
- Li Zhiyu as Xu Xilin
- Chen Xiguang as Chen Tianhua
- Yu Shizhi as Gui Fu
- Wang Fuli as Wu Zhiying
- Huang Meiying as Xu Jichen
- Cong Shan as Xiu Rong
- Zhang Kezhong as Wang Jinfa
- Wu Wenlun as Hu Daonan
- Shi Weijian as Sun Yat-sen

== Release ==
The film was released in 1983 in China.

== Accolades ==
Date	Award	Category	Recipient(s) and nominee(s)	Result	Notes
1984	4th Golden Rooster Awards	Best Supporting Actor	Yu Shizhi	Won	
1984	4th Golden Rooster Awards	Best Props	Xu Guoliang	Won	
