= Sound of Colors (TV series) =

- Poster for promotion
- Also known as
- Traditional Chinese: 地下鐵
- Simplified Chinese: 地下铁
- Hanyu Pinyin: Dì Xià Tiě
- Genre: Romance, Drama
- Directed by: Zhang Min
- Starring: Ruby Lin; Wallace Huo; Hao Lei
- Opening theme: Yong Xin Ting by Van Fan
- Ending theme: Zai Ni Yan Li by Rebecca Hsu
- Country of origin: China; Republic of China (Taiwan)
- Original language: Mandarin
- No. of episodes: 23

Production
- Executive producer: Zhou De Hua
- Production location: Nanjing
- Running time: approximately 45 minutes

Original release
- Network: CTS
- Release: May 9, 2006 – June 23, 2008

Sound of Colors is a Chinese and Taiwanese romance television series, based on the comic book of the same name by famous Taiwanese illustrator Jimmy Liao. It first broadcast on June 10, 2006 in Taiwan, followed by subsequent broadcasts in other Asian countries. A film version starring Tony Leung and Miriam Yeung was made in 2003, but the TV drama and the film have completely different storylines. While the television series is adapted from Liao's illustrations, the content of the TV version of "Sound of Colors" varies, as the plot is thicker.

== Plot summary ==
A flourishing metropolis, the crowd bustling about, each one conjecturing a beautiful wish to wait for his or her fate. A beautiful story can take place anywhere, perhaps it's in the mall, perhaps it's in the cafe, or perhaps, it's in the subway.....

=== First meet ===
A beautiful blind DJ with a beautiful heart, Jingjing is taking the subway to the radio station and Yun Xiang, who is having problems at work, also happens to take this train home. The both of them have been on the same train several times, it's as if they have been played by destiny, never met each other. But on this day, the cold-blooded Yun Xiang actually witness someone snatching Jingjing's handbag, while supporting Jingjing, who had fallen, he becomes attracted by this refreshing blind girl unbound by conventions. He runs after the thief and gets Jingjing's handbag back to her, and also gives his hand-painted umbrella to Jingjing to be a temporary substitute for the blind stick, which had landed on the subway rails. Jingjing is very grateful, agreeing to meet again. Meet again, the hibernating seed watered by the spring dew, will cultivate into a bright, fresh flower. Will they meet again? It is unknown to Jingjing, it's also unknown to Yun Xiang, after all life is full of unknowns.

=== Past memories ===
When Jingjing was little, she lost her parents and eyesight due to a traffic accident. Since childhood she faces all aspects of life optimistically. But this kind girl also has to encounter injustice. In fact Jingjing had a chance to restore her sight, because Yun Xiang's mother intended to donate her corneas to Jingjing before she died. But young Yun Xiang would not let anyone touch his mother, and threatens to bang his head on the wall if they do. Jingjing couldn't let that happen, and gave up on this matter in the end. Since Yun Xiang was younger, he was under the mistaken notion that his father Lu Mingkai had an affair with his assistant Wang You and indirectly caused his mother's death, he hated his father, gave up the good life and grew up in an orphanage.

=== Reunion ===
The appearance of well-known DJ Tan Li Na. In order to accommodate Tan Li Na, Jingjing's program was moved to 10 o'clock at night. One cannot imagine how this decision will create difficulties to a blind person's way of life, but she accepts it. There was even more inconvenience for Jingjing when she arrived at the radio station. Her advertisement executive older sister Mingming is very worried about her, not consenting on Jingjing going to work alone. However, she is busy with work and cannot do several things at once. Jingjing's boss Cheng Gao volunteers to take Jingjing to and from the radio station. But the ever so strong Jingjing persists that she wants to take care of herself. Mingming cannot stop her, and actually saw through that Cheng Gao likes Jingjing. Mingming vigorously works at getting them together, but it's impossible for Jingjing to have any feelings for her caring and talented boss because she wants to wait for the guy who let her borrowed his umbrella.

Yun Xiang's life appears to be more chaotic. At work he clashes with his boss because of differences in opinions and in life he is at a loss on how to face his father. His friends from the orphanage Xiao Chen and Xin Hua provide him with much encouragement and love. However, Yun Xiang is a person whose innermost feelings are sealed up, so no matter how hard his friends try, they cannot open him up. Fortunately, Yun Xiang is moved by Jingjing's evening program, allowing his chaotic moods to finally calm down. After all the twists and turns, Jingjing finally gets an opportunity to personally return the umbrella to Yun Xiang. At their second meeting, the feelings between them is more intense and the seed of love is rapidly growing.

=== Obstacle to love ===
When Yun Xiang takes Jingjing home, he meets a very familiar looking Mingming, unable to restrain himself in recalling past events. Not too long after, he discovers that the girl who gave up the chance to see again because of him is Jingjing. Yun Xiang regrets his past stubbornness. After taking this painful experience to heart, he calls the hotline number as "Xiao Lu" and under chance circumstances tells Jingjing of his regrets, and makes a sincere apology. Jingjing is greatly touched by this one phone call of apology. Jingjing's program is on fire, because everybody is searching for "Xiao Lu." Jingjing's heart is similarly on fire, because "Xiao Lu" only wants to be by Jingjing's side. Yun Xiang bravely tells Jingjing he loves her. Jingjing is moved by it and she tacitly consented. However, just when their relationship takes off, they are put to tough tests: Mingming objects to Jingjing being with Yun Xiang; because of jealousy towards Jingjing, Tan Li Na always launching attacks, and pretends to be "Xiao Lu" to hurt Jingjing; Xiao Chen, who loves Yun Xiang, wants to break them up; Mingkai is worried about his son's happiness, doing bad things but with good intentions, but this not only increase the misunderstanding between father and son, it also puts tremendous pressure on Jingjing. All these factors sadden Jingjing and she wants to leave Yun Xiang. However, the obstinate Yun Xiang is unwilling to give up. Yun Xiang works very hard to save his relationship.

== Main cast ==
- Ruby Lin as Fu Jing Jing (傅晶晶)
- Wallace Huo as Lu Yun Xiang (陸雲翔)
- Hao Lei as Fu Ming Ming (傅明明)
- Huang Meng as Fan Yang (范陽)
- Sun Xing as Cheng Gao (程高)
- Li Li Chun as Lu Mingkai (陸銘凱)
- Liu He Nan as Tan Li Na (譚麗娜)
- Lu Yang as Yang Xin Hua (楊新華)
- Chen Luo Qian as Xiao Chen (曉晨)
- Zhou Xiao Li as Wang You (汪佑)

== Production ==
- Filming began in July, 2005 and ended in September, 2005.
- Filming locations are Hangzhou and Nanjing
- Production company : Tianjin Television, Hangzhou Hua Xin Film and Television production company, Shanghai Jessie & Jones Production Co., Ltd., and etKing Media Technology Ltd
- They cost nearly 20000 US dollars per episode, almost the price to make one episode of an average TV drama.

== Differences with the movie ==
Though both of movie and TV series based on same book, there are many difference between them

Television series	Movie
Main casts : Ruby Lin, Wallace Huo	Main casts : Tony Leung, Miriam Yeung
in the TV version Wallace Huo plays a comic book artist(illustrator). Yun Xiang's character is the goal is to reflect some of Jimmy's real life situations	In the movie version Tony Leung plays a smart-aleck matchmaker at a matchmaking company
Yun Xiang is a person full of sadness. But he's always using mischievous smiles to conceal his unsettling innermost feelings. He doesn't go blind later on	

== International broadcasts ==
Country	TV Network	Series Premiere	Alternate title
China		March 2006	地下鐵 (Di Xia Tie)
Vietnam	VTV3	7 September 2006	Âm Thanh Của Sắc Màu
Taiwan	CTS	10 May 2006	地下鐵 - Sound of Colors
United States	KTSF	29 August 2006	Sound of Colors
Hong Kong	TVB	21 June 2006	地下鐵 (Di Xia Tie)
Japan	BS-N	6 April 2007	地下鉄の恋
Philippines	QTV	15 May 2007	Sound of Colors
Singapore	Mediacorp Channel U	March 2008	地下鐵 Sound of Colors
