= Maniniwei =

Malaysian Chinese picture book artist, writer and poet

- 林婉文
- Pronunciation: ˈwɑːnˈwɛnˈlɪn
- Born: Wǎn-wún Lin; 1980 (age 45–46); Muar, Johor, Malaysia
- Education: National Taiwan Normal University; National Taiwan University of Arts

Wǎn-wún Lin (Chinese: 林婉文; born 1980), who writes under the pen name Maniniwei, is a Malaysian writer, painter, and illustrator currently living in Taiwan. She grew up in Malaysia, studied at the Fine Arts Department of National Taiwan Normal University in 1999, and married after graduation. Inspired by her unpleasant experiences, Maniniwei began her career as a writer at the age of 30. Her books center around themes including marriage, parenthood, and family. She composes prose, poems, and picture books. Her works are mostly about herself, describing hatred and abjection in a dark, sharp style. Her first award-winning book Dahulu Parang Sekarang Besi: Pantun Melayu won the Book of the Year from OpenBook and the 35th Golden Tripod Award in the literature category in 2021.

== Early life ==
Maniniwei was born in 1980, in Muar (or Bandar Maharani), Johor, Malaysia. At the age of 19, she decided to pursue her education abroad in Taiwan. She graduated from the Fine Arts Department of the National Taiwan Normal University and later from the Fine Arts Institute of the National Taiwan University of Arts.

After graduation, Maniniwei took on the role of an art administrator in a gallery, where she engaged in copywriting and press releases. In 2009, at the age of 30, she transitioned away from formal employment and began exploring various roles, including aiding her alma mater in organizing art festivals. Despite facing challenges in her marriage, these experiences served as inspiration for her creative endeavors.

== Works ==
Maniniwei's first book, Shine with Your Impurities (2013) is a collection of Chinese prose, mainly about sorrow and difficulties a foreign spouse encountered in a traditional Taiwanese family. Maniniwei has published other prose collections since 2013, like I Wasn't Born To Be a Mother (2015), No Avenue (2018), and I Recalled Taipei After Many Years (2022).

She released picture books as an illustrator. In 2016, she published the Oblique Household Trilogy, which included three picture books: The Sea Hotel, The Cat With Old Man’s Face, and After. A sequel trilogy, Oblique Household Trilogy 2019, was published in 2019. In addition, she also published other picture books like The Velveteen Rabbit (2017), The Poet's Inn (2018), My Sister’s Empty House (2022) and Princess of Mount Ledang (2022). She also released bilingual (Malay and Chinese) picture books like Mat Jenin (馬惹尼, 2018) and Anjing Makan Angin (吃風集, 2018), and the illustrated handbook 100 Malay Ghosts (2021). In 2017, she published her first poem collection, We'll Talk Tomorrow.

== Writing style ==
Her writings center on the struggle between a mother's duty and her marriage. Hatred is the reason why she writes; she exploits her migration, family, and marriage situations as writing materials, portraying the difficulty of living in a foreign land as a foreign spouse. From prose and picture books to poems, her theme never detaches from "writing herself." In her picture book series Oblique Household Trilogy, the family images in her works often reflect a realistic and unidealized perspective of real life.

== Achievements ==
Maniniwei has won awards since 2020. Her book Dahulu Parang Sekarang Besi: Pantun Melayu won the Book of the Year from OpenBook, and the 35th Golden Tripod Award in the literature category in 2021. Around the same year, the Taoyuan Chung Chao-cheng Literary Award also awarded the first prize to Maniniwei for her Country Girl (山河少女). In 2021, Maniniwei won Kaohsiung Municipal Takao Literature Award in the category of Chinese prose for When I Fall Asleep (我睡覺的時候).

=== Selected awards ===
| Year | Award | Category | Works | Result | ref |
|---|---|---|---|---|---|
| 2013 | China Times OpenBook Award | Literature Category | Shine on Your Impurities | Nominated | |
| 2020 | OpenBook Award | Book of the Year | Dahulu Parang Sekarang Besi: Pantun Melayu | Won | |
| 2021 | 35th Golden Tripod Awards | Literature Category | | Won | |
| 2021 | Taoyuan Chung Chao-cheng Literary Award | Prose | Country Girl(山河少女) | Won | |
| 2021 | Kaohsiung Municipal Takau Literature Award | Prose | When I fall asleep(我睡覺的時候) | Won | |
| 2021 | 24th Taipei Literature Award | Writing Grant | Useless Hometown(故鄉無用) | Won | |
