= Sky Lovers =

Sky Lovers may mean:

- Sky Lovers (TV series), 2002 Chinese TV series
- Sky Lovers (film), 2002 Chinese film, unrelated to the TV series
