= Li Xiuming =

Chinese actress

- Born: 9 December 1954 (age 70); Tianjin, China
- Occupation: Actress
- Years active: 1973–1993
- Awards: Golden Rooster Awards – Best Actress; 1982 Xu Mao and His Daughters Hundred Flowers Awards – Best Actress; 1982 Xu Mao and His Daughters

Chinese name
- Traditional Chinese: 李秀明
- Simplified Chinese: 李秀明
Transcriptions
Yue: Cantonese
- Jyutping: lei5 sau3 ming4

Li Xiuming is a mainland Chinese film actress. She won both of Golden Rooster Award and Hundred Flowers Award for Best Actress, for Xu Mao and His Daughters. Her most remembered role are "Chunmiao" in Xie Jin's Chunmiao and "Princess Peacock". In 1993, she retired from Beijing Studio.

== Filmography ==
- Chunmiao (1975)
- Billows (1978)
- The Great River Flows On (1978)
- A Sweet Life (1979)
- The Stars are Bright Tonight (1981)
- Xu Mao and His Daughters (1981)
- Princess Peacock (1982)
- Your Smiles (1986)
- The Dream of Red Mansions, Part 1, 2, 6 (1988–1989)
