= Dong Xi (writer) =

Dong Xi (2026)

Dong Xi (simplified Chinese: 东西; traditional Chinese: 東西; pinyin: Dōng Xī; born 1966) is the pen name of Tian Dailin (simplified Chinese: 田代琳; traditional Chinese: 田代琳; pinyin: Tián Dàilín). He was born in Tian'e County in Guangxi. Dong Xi is a writer of novels, short stories, and screenplays. Six of his works have been adapted for movie and television. He is a member of China Writers Association and the All China Youth Federation and vice-chairman of Guangxi Federation of Literature and Art. He splits his time between a post at the Guangxi University for Nationalities and Beijing.

== Early life and first publications ==
Dong Xi was born in Guli in northwest Guangxi. His family suffered during the Cultural Revolution due to their formerly privileged status. Following the beginning of the reform and opening up, Dong Xi was able to join the Chinese department of Hechi Normal College (now known as Hechi University), a small college in northwestern Guangxi on the southern end of the Yunnan–Guizhou Plateau. It was at school that Dong Xi began submitting work to literary journals and magazines, including Tibet Literature, West China Literature, and Guangxi Literature. In the fall of 1992, Dong Xi broke into major literary magazines, publishing short fiction and two novellas in Harvest, Flower City and Chinese Writer.

== Success as a writer and adapting work for the screen ==
Dong Xi's short fiction and novellas are often grouped together with other work from writers that emerged in urban China in the 1980s. He eventually moved to Beijing and began working with screenwriters, as well as adapting his own work for TV and film. His most notable adaptation for film is the 2002 film, Sky Lovers, based on his novel, Life Without Language (the same novella was adapted for a 20-episode TV series by Guangxi Mandile Film and Culture Co. Ltd.). The adaptation won a Best Artistic Contribution at the 15th Tokyo International Film Festival. My Sister's Dictionary (2005) was adapted from Dong Xi's A Resounding Slap in the Face (1998).

== Notable works ==
- Life Without Language (Nanjing: Jiangsu Literature and Art Publishing House, 1995). Adapted for the 2002 film, Sky Lovers. Won the Lu Xun Literary Prize's National Excellent Novella Award in 1995. Translated as "Life Without Language" by Dylan Levi King in Chinese Literature Today (Volume 7, 2018).
- A Resounding Slap in the Face (Changchun: Changchun Publishing House, 1998). Currently untranslated. Adapted for TV as Slap! and for film as My Sister's Dictionary (2005).
- Record of Regret (Beijing: People's Literature Publishing House, 2005). Translated as Record of Regret by Dylan Levi King for University of Oklahoma Press (2018).
- Fate Rewritten (Shanghai: Shanghai Literature and Art Publishing House, 2015). Translated as Fate Rewritten by John Balcom for Sinoist Books (2024).
- Ripples in the Lake (Beijing: People's Literature Publishing House, 2021). Won the Mao Dun Literature Prize in 2023. Translated as Ripples in the Lake by James Trapp for Sinoist Books (2026).
