= Chunmiao =

1975 film

- Film poster
- Traditional Chinese: 春苗
- Directed by: Xie Jin; Yan Bili; Liang Tingduo
- Starring: Li Xiuming; Feng Qi; Da Shichang; Liu Zinong; Gao Baocheng
- Cinematography: Lu Junfu
- Production company: Shanghai Film Studio
- Release date: 1975
- Running time: 112 minutes
- Country: China
- Language: Mandarin

Chunmiao (Chinese: 春苗) is a 1975 Chinese film directed by Xie Jin, Yan Bili and Liang Tingduo, starring Li Xiuming as the titular village girl who became a barefoot doctor through political struggle. Like all films released in the Cultural Revolution, it is a propaganda film, in this case promoting the Criticize Lin, Criticize Confucius movement.

The ultra-leftist political message aside, the film is considered well-made artistically. It was shot in the countryside near Shaoxing, Zhejiang. It was Xie Jin's only film during the Cultural Revolution (1966–1976).

== Cast ==
- Li Xiuming as Chunmiao
- Feng Qi as Qian Jiren
- Da Shichang as Fang Ming
- Liu Zinong as Li Aqiang
- Gao Baocheng as Uncle Shuichang
- Li Lingjun as Auntie Ah Fang
- Bai Mu as Du Wenjie
- Zhang Yu as Lianlian
