= Jingjiang =

Jingjiang 靖江市 Tsingkiang
- County-level city
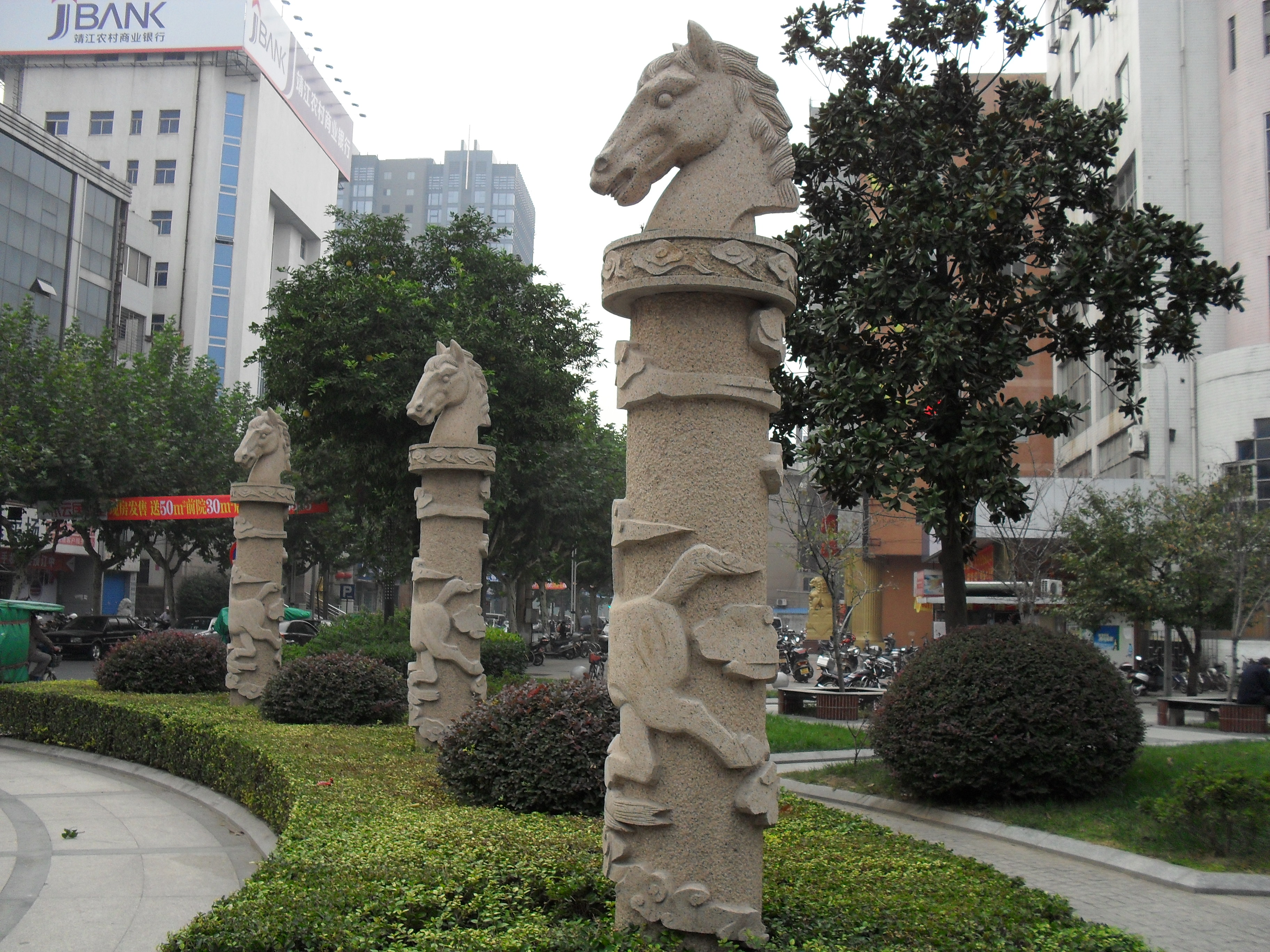
- Stone pillar sculptures in Jingjiang

- Location in Jiangsu Jingjiang (Eastern China) Jingjiang (China)
- Coordinates: 32°00′32″N 120°15′47″E
- Country: People's Republic of China
- Province: Jiangsu
- Prefecture-level city: Taizhou

Area
  - County-level city: 665 km^{2} (257 sq mi)

Population (2020 census)
  - County-level city: 663,408
  - Density: 998/km^{2} (2,580/sq mi)
  - Urban: 453,970
  - Rural: 209,438
- Time zone: UTC+8 (China Standard)
- Postal code: 214500

Jingjiang (Chinese: 靖江; pinyin: Jìngjiāng) is a county-level city under the administration of Taizhou, Jiangsu province, China. It is located on the northern (left) bank of the Yangtze River, and is the southernmost part of Taizhou City, bordering Nantong to the northeast, Suzhou to the southeast, Wuxi to the south, Changzhou to the southwest, and Zhenjiang to the west. The area of Jingjiang is 655.6 square kilometres and the population was 663,408 at the 2020 census.

== History ==
The modern terrain of Jingjiang originated as a sandbank in the Yangtze River known as Matuosha. After the shoal was extended, it was separated from Jiangyin county to form a new county in 1471. After being looted by Wokou several times, it was designated Jingjiang, meaning "pacifying the Yangtze River".

The county was administered by the prefecture-level city of Yangzhou until 1993, when it was converted to a county-level city. It was then transferred to Taizhou in 1996.

== Geography ==
The Yangtze previously split into northern and southern distributaries at Jingjiang, but the city merged into the north bank after the 1610s, as the northern distributary was filled in by continued deposition.

== Climate ==
Climate data for Jingjiang, elevation 10 m (33 ft), (1991–2020 normals, extremes 1981–present)
Month	Jan	Feb	Mar	Apr	May	Jun	Jul	Aug	Sep	Oct	Nov	Dec	Year
Record high °C (°F)	20.6 (69.1)	25.8 (78.4)	33.1 (91.6)	34.3 (93.7)	35.1 (95.2)	38.0 (100.4)	39.1 (102.4)	40.6 (105.1)	37.1 (98.8)	33.2 (91.8)	28.1 (82.6)	22.2 (72.0)	40.6 (105.1)
Mean daily maximum °C (°F)	7.5 (45.5)	9.9 (49.8)	14.6 (58.3)	20.8 (69.4)	26.1 (79.0)	28.9 (84.0)	32.6 (90.7)	32.1 (89.8)	28.0 (82.4)	22.9 (73.2)	16.9 (62.4)	10.2 (50.4)	20.9 (69.6)
Daily mean °C (°F)	3.7 (38.7)	5.7 (42.3)	10.0 (50.0)	15.9 (60.6)	21.3 (70.3)	24.8 (76.6)	28.7 (83.7)	28.2 (82.8)	24.0 (75.2)	18.6 (65.5)	12.6 (54.7)	6.1 (43.0)	16.6 (62.0)
Mean daily minimum °C (°F)	0.9 (33.6)	2.6 (36.7)	6.4 (43.5)	11.8 (53.2)	17.2 (63.0)	21.6 (70.9)	25.5 (77.9)	25.2 (77.4)	20.8 (69.4)	15.0 (59.0)	9.1 (48.4)	3.0 (37.4)	13.3 (55.9)
Record low °C (°F)	−9.2 (15.4)	−8.8 (16.2)	−5.5 (22.1)	0.3 (32.5)	6.0 (42.8)	11.9 (53.4)	17.9 (64.2)	17.8 (64.0)	9.4 (48.9)	0.8 (33.4)	−4.8 (23.4)	−11.2 (11.8)	−11.2 (11.8)
Average precipitation mm (inches)	57.2 (2.25)	54.6 (2.15)	76.2 (3.00)	74.4 (2.93)	94.7 (3.73)	196.9 (7.75)	200.0 (7.87)	178.9 (7.04)	88.6 (3.49)	59.8 (2.35)	54.5 (2.15)	37.4 (1.47)	1,173.2 (46.18)
Average precipitation days (≥ 0.1 mm)	9.6	9.2	10.7	9.9	10.7	11.9	12.8	12.7	8.5	7.3	8.6	7.7	119.6
Average snowy days	3.2	2.5	0.8	0.1	0	0	0	0	0	0	0.2	1.0	7.8
Average relative humidity (%)	73	72	70	68	70	76	78	79	77	73	73	71	73
Mean monthly sunshine hours	134.1	134.3	161.6	186.1	199.8	161.1	207.5	214.6	186.0	181.8	154.3	151.5	2,072.7
Percentage possible sunshine	42	43	43	48	47	38	48	53	51	52	49	49	47
Source: China Meteorological Administration all-time extreme temperature all-time January high

== Transportation ==
The city is part of the Yangtze River Delta region and has one river crossing. The Jiangyin Suspension Bridge, which carries the G2 Beijing–Shanghai Expressway to Jiangyin, is one of the longest suspension bridges in the world. The G40 Shanghai–Xi'an Expressway to Nanjing and Shanghai also passes through the city.

== Economy ==
Traditionally, the city has been noted for its core manufacturing industries in electronics, auto parts, biochemicals, textiles and machinery. Emerging industries include shipbuilding and logistics (transport).

Seven major local shipyards, including one of China's largest private shipyards New Century Shipyard and its subsidiary New Time Shipyard; New Yangtze Shipyard, which went public in Singapore in 2007 and it was the first ever China's private shipyard listed on overseas stock exchange.

== Administrative divisions ==
Jingjiang city consists of 1 subdistrict and 8 towns:

1 subdistrict

- Jingcheng (靖城街道) - is upgraded from town.

8 towns

- Xinqiao (新桥镇)
- Dongxing (东兴镇)
- Xieqiao (斜桥镇)
- Xilai (西来镇)
- Jishi (季市镇)
- Gushan (孤山镇)
- Shengci (生祠镇)
- Maqiao (马桥镇)

Former town

- Binjiang (滨江新城)

In addition the city has a provincial level economic development zone (Jingjiang Economic Development Zone).

== School and Education ==
Middle School:

- Jiangsu Jingjiang Senior Middle School
- Jiangsu Jingjiang Xieqiao Middle School
- Jiangjiang No.1 Middle School
- Jingjiang Bingjiang School
- Jingjiang Foreign Language School

== Food ==
The city is noted for its pork jerky and slices, along with steamed soup dumplings filled with crab juices.

== Notable people ==
- Gao Jin
- Henry Liu
- Tao Siju
- Song Zude
- Younan Xia
