= Younan Xia =

Chinese-American nanomedicine researcher

- Xia in 2026
- Born: October 16, 1965 (age 61); Jingjiang, Jiangsu, China
- Education: University of Science and Technology of China (BS); University of Pennsylvania (MS); Harvard University (PhD)
- Awards: Elected member, National Academy of Medicine (2026) Elected member, National Academy of Engineering (2026) Elected member, National Academy of Inventors (2025) ACS Linus Pauling Medal (2024)
- Scientific career
- Fields: Chemistry, Biomedical Engineering, Materials Science, Nanotechnology
- Workplaces: Johns Hopkins University
- Doctoral advisor: George M. Whitesides
- Website: www.nanocages.com

Younan Xia (Chinese: 夏幼南; born on the 16th of October, 1965) is a Chinese-American chemist, materials scientist, and bioengineer. He is the Bloomberg Distinguished Professor of Nanoscience and Nanotechnology, with joint appointments in the departments of Materials Science and Engineering and Biomedical Engineering at Johns Hopkins University.

== Early life and education ==
Xia was born in Jingjiang, Jiangsu, China, in 1965. He received his B.S degree in chemical physics from the University of Science and Technology of China (USTC) in 1987. He then pursued graduate studies at the Fujian Institute of Research on the Structure of Matter until the end of 1990.

In 1991, he moved to the United States and received an M.S. degree in inorganic chemistry from the University of Pennsylvania with Alan G. MacDiarmid in 1993. He received his PhD degree in physical chemistry from Harvard University with George M. Whitesides in 1996.

== Research ==
The current research of Xia and his group centers on the development of new chemistry, physics, and technological applications of nano-structured materials – a class of materials which feature sizes less than 100 nm. His research includes the chemistry and physics of nanomaterial synthesis, the application of nanomaterials to biomedical research, and developing nanomaterials for energy- and environment-related applications.

Xia co-invented soft lithography while he was a PhD student with George M. Whitesides at Harvard University. As an independent researcher, he and his group have made original and important contributions to the following areas: colloidal crystals and their photonic applications, colloidal assembly, one-dimensional nanostructures, electrospinning and alignment of nanofibers, electrospun nanofibers as scaffolds for tissue engineering, shape-controlled synthesis of colloidal nanocrystals and their applications in plasmonics, spectroscopy, heterogeneous catalysis, and electrocatalysis, invention of silver nanostructures with many different morphologies such as nanowires and nanocubes, and invention of gold nanocages and exploration of their biomedical applications.

== Involvement with academic journals ==
- Xia was an associate editor of Nano Letters for 17 years (2002–2019) and is on its advisory board.
- He is the Editor-in-Chief (inaugural) of Materials and Interfaces (2024–).
- Xia has served or is serving on the Advisory Boards of WIRES Nanomedicine and Nanotechnology (2025–), Information & Functional Materials (2024–), Green Carbon (2023–), Carbon Future (2023–), Precision Chemistry (2023–), National Science Review (2023–2027),
- Advanced Healthcare Materials (Executive Advisory Board, 2022–), BMEMat (2022–), Accounts of Materials Research (2021–), ChemCatChem (2021–),
- Advanced Healthcare Materials (2011–2022)
- Chairman of the International advisory board), Nano Letters (2020–), Chemical Reviews (2019–), BME Frontiers (2019–), Research (2018–2021), ACS Applied Nano Materials (2018–2020), Small Methods (2017–), ChemNanoMat (2015–),
- Chemical Physics Letters (2014-), Chinese Journal of Chemistry (2014–), Chemistry: A European Journal (2014–2021), Cancer Nanotechnology (2014–2017), Particle & Particle Systems Characterization (2013–),
- Angewandte Chemie International Edition (2011–2020), Chemistry: An Asian Journal (2010–), Accounts of Chemical Research (2010–2016), Journal of Biomedical Optics (2010–2014), Science of Advanced Materials (2009–2015),
- Nano Research (2008–), Nano Today (2006–), Langmuir (2005–2010, 2013–2015), Chemistry of Materials (2005–2007),
- International Journal of Nanotechnology (2003–), and Advanced Functional Materials (2001–),
- World Scientific Series in Nanoscience and Nanotechnology (2009–, World Scientific Publishers), Dekker Encyclopedia of Nanoscience and Nanotechnology (2001, Marcel Dekker Inc.).
- He has also served as a Guest Editor of special issues for Chemical Reviews, Advanced Healthcare Materials, Advanced Materials, Advanced Functional Materials, MRS Bulletin, and Accounts of Chemical Research.

== Awards ==
Xia has received a number of prestigious awards:

- Elected member, National Academy of Medicine (2026).
- Elected member, National Academy of Engineering (2026),
- Elected member, National Academy of Inventors (2025),
- ACS Linus Pauling Medal (2024),
- ACS Award for Creative Invention (2023),
- MRS Medal (2017),
- ACS Fellow (2014),
- Nano Today Award (2013),
- MRS Fred Kavli Distinguished Lectureship in Nanoscience (2013),
- ACS National Award in the Chemistry of Materials (2013),
- AIMBE Fellow (2011),
- MRS Fellow (2009 ),
- NIH Director's Pioneer Award (2006),
- ACS Leo Hendrik Baekeland Award (2005),
- Camille Dreyfus Teacher Scholar (2002),
- David and Lucile Packard Fellowship in Science and Engineering (2000),
- Alfred P. Sloan Research Fellow (2000),
- NSF Early Career Development Award (1999),
- ACS Victor K. LaMer Award (1999),
- NSF Faculty Early Career Development Award (1999),
- Camille and Henry Dreyfus New Faculty Award (1997),

Xia was named by Times Higher Education one of the Top 10 chemists (#5) in the world from 1999 to 2009 based on the number of citations per paper. He was also ranked one of the Top 100 material scientists (#4) and top 100 chemists (#35) in the world from 2000 to 2010 based on the number of citations per paper. He was named one of the world's most influential scientific minds in 2015 in the fields of Chemistry and Materials Science, Best Scientists in the field of Materials Science (ranked #6 in the world and #5 in the United States of America) and Materials Science Leader Award for 2023, ScholarGPS #2 Ranking in Biomedical Engineering among all academic scholars in the United States (2024). Highly Ranked Scholar— Lifetime— in the Field of Engineering and Computer Science (2025).
