= Xie Tian =

Chinese actor and director (1914–2003)

- 谢添
- Xie in 1962
- Born: Xie Hongkun; June 18, 1914; Tianjin, China
- Died: December 13, 2003 (aged 89); Beijing, China
- Occupations: Actor; Director

Xie Tian (Chinese: 谢添; pinyin: Xiè Tiān; 18 June 1914 – 13 December 2003), born Xie Hongkun (Chinese: 谢洪坤; pinyin: Xiè Hóngkūn), was a Chinese actor and director. He is best known for portraying Mr. Lin in The Lin Family Shop and directing The Teahouse, based on the play of the same name by Lao She. In 1980, Xie won the Hundred Flowers Award for Best Director for his film, A Sweet Life.

== Early life ==
Born on 18 June 1914, Xie used to perform in stage plays at his hometown. In 1935, he moved to Shanghai and joined left-wing drama troupe, Society of Shanghai Amateur Actors, and appeared in several productions from Star Motion Picture Company such as The Qingming Festival, Lucky Money, and Street Angel (uncredited).

== Career ==
After the Second Sino-Japanese War, Xie joined Shanghai Film Actors' Drama Troupe. In 1940, he had a lead role in He Mengfu's patriotic film Snow Storm over the Taihang Mountains. In the late 1940s, he worked for Central Motion Picture Company, appearing in films such as The Holy City, Pursuit, and Fragrance Fills up the Courtyard.

In 1949, Xie joined Beijing Film Studio and appeared in films as the villain in New Heroes and Heroines, Professor Song in March of the Democratic Youth, and title character Mr. Lin in The Lin Family Shop which was well received.

From 1955 to 1957, Xie studied film directing at Beijing Film Academy. In 1959, Xie directed his first two films, Life of a Swimmer and A World of Joy. In the following years, Xie would direct many more films such as Red Guards of Lake Hong, A Happy Plus, and Three Little Red Flowers. In 1979, Xie directed A Sweet Life, which won him the Hundred Flowers Award for Best Director in 1980.

After the Cultural Revolution, Xie resumed his career in the 1980s, directing films more centered on recent historical events such as Red Heart and Sweet Business. In 1981, Xie's film The Seventh Grade Sesame Official won the Best Opera Film Award at the 4th Hundred Flowers Awards.

In 1982, Xie directed a film adaptation of Lao She's play Teahouse titled The Teahouse, which was well-received and won the Special Award at the 3rd Golden Rooster Awards. He directed his last film, Tears of a Courtesan, in 1988. Xie still continued acting, appearing in films such as Xie Jin's An Old Man and His Dog and Huang Jianzhong's Hongniang.

== Death ==
Xie died on December 13, 2003, at Jishuitan Hospital from heart failure. He was cremated and his ashes were scattered in the Bohai Sea.
