= Woman Basketball Player No. 5 =

1957 Chinese film directed by Xie Jin

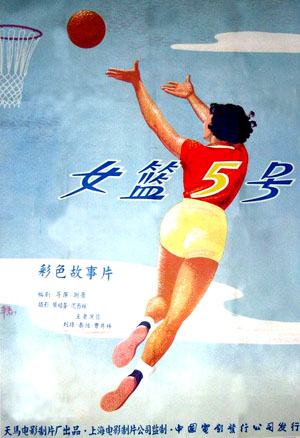
- Film poster
- Traditional Chinese: 女籃5號
- Simplified Chinese: 女篮5号
- Hanyu Pinyin: Nǚ lán wǔ hào
- Directed by: Xie Jin
- Written by: Xie Jin
- Starring: Qin Yi
- Cinematography: Shen Xilin; Huang Shaofen
- Music by: Zhun Huang
- Production company: Tianma Film Studio
- Release date: 1957
- Running time: 86 minutes
- Language: Mandarin

Woman Basketball Player No. 5 (simplified Chinese: 女篮5号; traditional Chinese: 女籃5號; pinyin: Nǚlán Wǔ Hào) is a 1957 Chinese film presented by Tianma Film Studio and directed by Xie Jin, starring Qin Yi, Liu Qiong, Cao Qiwei and Wang Qi. It is the first colored sports movie filmed after the formation of the People's Republic of China. Yang Jie (杨洁), who was No. 5 in China women's national basketball team, was the prototype of the film.

== Plot ==
Before the establishment of the People's Republic of China, Lin Jie, the daughter of the boss of the East China Basketball Team in Shanghai, falls in love with the team's leading player, Tian Zhenhua. During a game against foreign marine soldiers, the boss accepts a bribe and orders the team to lose. Because of his patriotism, however, Tian leads the team to victory. As a result, the boss hires thugs to beat Tian, and also forces his daughter to marry a rich man.

18 years later, Tian is now the coach of Shanghai Woman Basketball Team. Xiao Jie, Lin's daughter, is a girl with basketball talent who is also prejudiced against a sporting career. Tian educates and helps her patiently. Xiao Jie is injured in a game and hospitalized. Tian and Lin reunite by chance when both visit Xiao Jie, and reignite their love. Xiao Jie is later selected for the national team to participate in international games.
