= An Old Man and His Dog =

- Film poster
- 老人与狗
- Directed by: Xie Jin
- Written by: Li Zhun; Zhang Xianliang
- Based on: 邢老汉和狗的故事 (trans. The Story of Old Man Xing and the Dog) by Zhang Xianliang
- Produced by: Zhigu Cheng
- Starring: Siqin Gaowa; Xie Tian
- Edited by: Wei Chunbao
- Music by: Wang Yongji
- Release date: 7 October 1993 (China)
- Running time: 90 minutes
- Country: China
- Language: Mandarin

An Old Man and His Dog (Chinese: 老人与狗; pinyin: lǎorényǔgǒu) is a 1993 Chinese drama film directed by Xie Jin which stars Xie Tian, Baocheng Gao, Jin Meng, Siqin Gaowa, and Feng Enhe. It is based on the novel of the same name by Zhang Xianliang. Set in the 1970s, the story revolves around Xing Laohan (Xie), and his relationship with a young lady (Siqin).

The film gained notoriety for featuring serial killer and dog breeder Peng Cheng in the film as a body double for Xie, along with including Peng's dogs, which he fed his victim's remains to. The film was banned for two decades after its release upon the discovery of Peng's crimes, although the ban was rescinded sometime in the 2010s.

== Plot ==
In the 1970s, in the countryside in Northwestern China, Xing Laohan (Xie Tian) is a bachelor who lives alone with only his dog for company. A woman (Siqin Gaowa) arrives one day, begging Xing for food. Her hometown had just been destroyed following a natural disaster, and the townspeople there were starving. Xing allows her to stay and provides her with food. During her time there, Xing feels happy to have company again. However, the woman is worried about her family back home, especially because she left without their permission. She eventually gets word that her family's conditions there have only worsened, and she leaves to head back to her hometown as she worries over them, especially over her fourteen-year-old daughter. Xing is distraught following her departure and, as she leaves, his village puts out a notice ordering all dogs to be killed for food. He loses both his dog and the woman by the time winter arrives. One winter morning, his neighbours check up on him and find him dead in his house.

== Cast ==
- Xie Tian as Xing Laohan
- Siqin Gaowa as Kuang Yuqing/Nunu
- Baocheng Gao as Wei Laohan
- Feng Enhe as Director Wei Tiangui
- Jin Meng as Ma Shanpo

== Controversy ==
In March 1993, during filming, Xie Jin struggled with finding a dog suitable for An Old Man And His Dog so he unknowingly approved Peng Cheng, a serial killer, and one of his dogs. He allowed Peng to stay on set and help his dog perform in some of the scenes, with the payoff that he was cast as the body double for the main actor, Xie Tian, being filmed in some of the scenes in which the protagonist rides on horseback. Later when it was discovered that Peng was a serial killer, the film was banned for two decades after its release, but the ban was rescinded sometime during the 2010s.
