= Song Zude =

- Born: August 24, 1968 (age 57); Jingjiang, Jiangsu, China
- Occupations: manager, actor

Chinese name
- Simplified Chinese: 宋祖德
Transcriptions
Standard Mandarin
- Hanyu Pinyin: Sòng Zǔdé

Song Zude (Chinese: 宋祖德; pinyin: Sòng Zǔdé; born August 24, 1968), known as "the King of Media Hype", is a famous person in the entertainment circle of mainland China. From 2002 to 2008, his accusations and allegations toward different celebrities have been responded by national attention.

Song was born in Jingjiang, Jiangsu in 1968. He graduated from Shanghai Jiao Tong University in 1989.

Song, renowned as one of the most controversial people in China, could always attract nationwide attention after he publicizes his accusations toward different people.

In January 2005, after he announced he was willing to buy the chest hair of Fei Xiang, a singer in Asia, in order to donate for the relief effort of 2004 Indian Ocean earthquake, people from both Indonesia and China accused him of disrespect. In October, 2008, after he accused the late Xie Jin, a well-known and respected film maker in China who died earlier that month, of having a dissolute life, most of the major medias in mainland China, as well as government-controlled agencies, accused him harshly. He is now known by a great number of people in mainland China.
