= Feng Enhe =

Chinese actor (born 1948)

- 冯恩鹤
- Born: April 1, 1948 (age 77); Wafangdian, Dalian, China
- Other names: Feng En-he
- Occupation: Actor

Feng Enhe (Chinese: 冯恩鹤; born 1 April 1948) is a Chinese actor. He is best known for his role as Wu Jingzhong in Lurk (2009), Xu Wenzheng in The Identity of Father (2016), and Na Zhenghong in The Legendary Tavern (2019). In 2009, he was nominated for the Magnolia Award for Best Actor in a Television Series for Lurk.

== Early life and career ==
Feng was born in Wafangdian, Dalian, China in 1948. After graduating from high school, Feng decided to catch up with the mountains and the countryside and he decided to become a middle school teacher in rural Liaoning.

In 1969, Feng was enlisted in the army and was assigned to the submarine detachment of the East China Sea Fleet. He is good at playing the trumpet, playing basketball, and swimming, so he became a fleet propaganda member and he would often go to the island to perform for the officers and soldiers.

In 1971, Beijing's Haizheng Repertory Troupe selected some actors in the system and Feng was favoured by the repertory group for his good image and versatility. In this way, he became a professional actor for the Haizheng Repertory Company.

In 1978, Feng was transferred to work at Eight Film Studios. Not long after arriving, Feng was introduced to Ji Ying, who he later went on a blind date with. They later got married and had one son.

== Filmography ==
=== Film ===
Year	Title	Role	Notes
1979	Moonlight on Second Spring 二泉映月	A Gen	
1981	Liberation of Shijiazhuang 石家庄解放	Youcai Pang	
1983	Xu Mao and his Daughters 徐茂和他的女儿们	Jin Dong-shui	as En-he Feng
1983	Ward 16 十六号病房	Chen Zhongnan	
1991	Ancient Tomb 古墓荒斋		
1992	Decisive Engagement: The Liaoxi-Shenyang Campaign 大决战之辽沈战役	Duan Suquan	
1993	An Old Man and His Dog 老人与狗	Wei Tiangui	
1994	The Cradle with Wheels 带轱辘的摇篮	Che Dui Zhang	as En-he Feng
2002	Sky Lovers 天上的恋人	Jia Kuan's father	
2011	The Warring States 战国	Emperor of Wei	
2011	The Space Dream 飞天		
2016	I Am Not Madame Bovary 我不是潘金莲	retired Chief Justice	

==== Television ====
Year	Title	Role	Notes
2006	Winter Jasmine 迎春花	Cao Zhengde	
2009–2010	Lurk 潜伏	Wu Jingzhong	as En-he feng Won – China Television Director Committee Award Nominated – Magnolia Award for Best Performance by an Actor in a Television Series
2014	Homeland 远翔	Yue Zhichun	
2014	Super Partner 沈佺期并		TV Mini series
2015	Underground 2: Islands Continent	Gu Xianzhang	
2016	The Identity of Father 父亲的身份	Xu Wenzheng	
2017	Lonely Battle 股占	Li Shi Jie	
2017	Game of Hunting 猎场	Yan Binghe	52 episodes
2019	The Legendary Tavern 老酒館	Na Zhenghong	44 episodes
2020	Happiness Will Knock 幸福还会来敲门		
2023	Anti-Corruption Storm 风雨送春归	Yin Guomin	
