= When the Moon Forgot =

1999 picture book by Jimmy Liao

- Author: Jimmy Liao
- Original title: 月亮忘記了
- Illustrator: Jimmy Liao
- Language: Chinese
- Genre: Children's literature
- Publication date: 1999
- Publication place: Taiwan
- English publication date: 2009
- ISBN: 978-7-80138-802-5

When the Moon Forgot (originally published in Taiwan as 月亮忘記了 [The Moon Forgets]) is a children's book originally written in Chinese by Jimmy Liao in 1999. It was later translated into English in 2009 and published by Little, Brown and Company.

== Plot ==
The Moon Forgets tells the story of what happens when the Moon falls from the sky, and is adopted by a little boy, while toy moons are produced. The boy and the Moon become close friends with each other, but the toy moons are discarded and nothing goes right, because the world misses its moon. The tides, weather, and astronauts are all affected by the loss of the Moon. The boy helps the Moon to find its way back to its place in the sky, even if it means that they part.

== Reception ==
Publishers Weekly found "A congruent message doesn't fully materialize, but readers should be entranced by Liao's (The Blue Stone ) fanciful, surreal illustrations." Terry Hong of Book Dragon said "As usual, Liao's wistful illustrations are perfect."

== Installation art ==
The Moon Bus is an installation art in Xinyi District, Taipei, Taiwan which was based on the book. From the outside, it looks like a normal bus, but inside are characters and scenes from Liao's children's books.
