= Hundred Flowers Award for Best Director =

Chinese film award

- Simplified Chinese: 大众电影百花奖最佳导演
- Traditional Chinese: 大眾電影百花獎最佳導演
Transcriptions
Standard Mandarin
- Hanyu Pinyin: Dàzhòng Diànyǐng Bǎihuājiǎng Zuìjiā Dǎoyǎn

The Hundred Flowers Award for Best Director was first awarded by the China Film Association in 1962. During 1981-2004, there were no awards presented in the Best Director category.

== Records ==
Items	Name	Statistics	Notes
Most win	Feng Xiaogang	3 wins	
Oldest winner	Xie Tian	Age 66	for A Sweet Life
Youngest winner	Zhao Wei	Age 38	for So Young
First female director win	Wang Ping	1 win	1963, for Locust Tree Village
First Hong Kong director nominee	Stephen Chow; Stanley Tong	Year 2006	for Kung Fu Hustle for The Myth
First Taiwan director nominee	Chen Kuo-fu	Year 2010	for The Message
Won Golden Rooster Award for Best Director for the same picture	Feng Xiaogang	Year 2008	for The Assembly
Won Golden Rooster Award for Best Directorial Debut for the same picture	Zhao Wei	Year 2014	for So Young

== 2010s ==
Year	Number	Director	Film
2018	34th	Dante Lam	Operation Red Sea
2018	34th	Dante Lam	Operation Mekong
2018	34th	Derek Tsang	Soul Mate
2018	34th	Wu Jing	Wolf Warrior 2
2018	34th	Chen Sicheng	Detective Chinatown 2
2016	33rd	Wuershan	Mojin: The Lost Legend
2016	33rd	Guan Hu	Mr. Six
2016	33rd	Peter Chan	Dearest
2016	33rd	Wu Jing	Wolf Warriors
2016	33rd	Raman Hui	Monster Hunt
2014	32nd	Zhao Wei 赵薇	So Young\致我们终将逝去的青春
2014	32nd	Wong Kar-wai 王家卫	The Grandmaster\一代宗师
2014	32nd	Xue Xiaolu 薛晓璐	Finding Mr. Right\北京遇上西雅图
2014	32nd	Chen Li 陈力	Four Days and Nights of Zhou Enlai\周恩来的四个昼夜
2014	32nd	Peter Chan 陈可辛	American Dreams in China\中国合伙人
2012	31st	Feng Xiaogang 冯小刚	Aftershock\唐山大地震
2012	31st	Teng Huatao 滕华涛	Love Is Not Blind\失恋33天
2012	31st	Zhang Li 张黎	1911\辛亥革命
2012	31st	Tsui Hark 徐克	The Flying Swords of Dragon Gate\龙门飞甲
2012	31st	Han Sanping 韩三平; Huang Jianxin 黄建新	The Founding of a Party\建党伟业
2010	30th	Feng Xiaogang 冯小刚	If You Are the One\非诚勿扰
2010	30th	Han Sanping 韩三平; Huang Jianxin 黄建新	The Founding of a Republic\建国大业
2010	30th	Gao Qunshu 高群书; Chen Kuo-fu 陈国富	The Message\风声
2010	30th	Teddy Chan 陈德森	Bodyguards and Assassins\十月围城
2010	30th	Wang Jia 王珈; Shen Dong 沈东	Jing tian dong di\惊天动地

== 2000s ==
Year	Number	Director	Film
2008	29th	Feng Xiaogang 冯小刚	The Assembly\集结号
2008	29th	Stephen Chow 周星驰	CJ 7\长江七号
2008	29th	Ning Hao 宁浩	Crazy Stone\疯狂的石头
2008	29th	Yin Li 尹力	The Knot\云水谣
2008	29th	Gao Qunshu 高群书	Tokyo Trial \东京审判
2006	28th	Yin Li 尹力	Zhang Side\张思德
2006	28th	Stephen Chow 周星驰	Kung Fu Hustle\功夫
2006	28th	Zhang Yimou 张艺谋	House of Flying Daggers\十面埋伏
2006	28th	Feng Xiaogang 冯小刚	A World Without Thieves\天下无贼
2006	28th	Stanley Tong 唐季礼	The Myth\神话

== 1980s ==
Year	Number	Director	Film
1980	3rd	Xie Tian 谢添	A Sweet Life\甜蜜的事业

== 1960s ==
Year	Number	Director	Film
1963	2nd	Wang Ping 王苹	Locust Tree Village\槐树庄
1962	1st	Xie Jin 谢晋	The Red Detachment of Women\红色娘子军
