= Beautiful Solitude =

- Author: Jimmy Liao
- Original title: 又寂寞又美好
- Illustrator: Jimmy Liao
- Language: Chinese
- Genre: Children's literature
- Publication date: 2003
- Publication place: Taiwan
- ISBN: 978-9867600295

Beautiful Solitude (Chinese: 又寂寞又美好, which literally means "Lonely and Wonderful,") is a picture book, authored and illustrated by Jimmy Liao, completed in 2003.

The book was created when Jimmy Liao was diagnosed with leukemia. That time was marked by feelings of gloom, and during his cancer treatment, he lived alone: both enjoying and enduring the accompanying loneliness. At that time, Jimmy used pictures as an outlet and a source for hope. Throughout the picture book, Jimmy uses dark colors and a monotone drawing style to help demonstrate his feelings of solitude and wonder. The language in the book is simple, but touching.
