= Golden Tripod =

Literature award in Taiwan

The Golden Tripod Award (Chinese: 金鼎獎) is the highest honor in Taiwan’s publishing industry. It was launched in 1976, and was sponsored by the Government Information Office until 2012, when the Ministry of Culture began awarding the prize. The award ceremony was first televised in 1982.

== 41st Awards (2017) ==
A total of 1178 entries were submitted for 19 awards. There were 29 winners and 29 excellent publication recommendation awards.

Special contribution award: Guo Zhongxin 郭重興 (Head of the Reading Republic Publishing Group 讀書共和國出版集團社長)

== 40th Awards (2016) ==
A total of 1189 magazines, books and digital publications were submitted for 21 awards. There were 28 winners and 31 excellent publication recommendation awards.

Special contribution award: Howard Chen (Founder of the Taiwan Association for Independent Bookshop Culture)

== 39th Awards (2015) ==
A total of 1403 titles were submitted for 22 awards.

Special contribution award: Ho Cheng-kuang (for advancing art education in Taiwan over the last 40 years, including the art periodical Artist Magazine)

Best Literature Book

- Quiet Solitude, by novelist Huang Li-chun and photographer Quo Ying-sheng.

Best Non-fiction

- Wansei Returning Home, by Mika Tanaka
- At My Family Table, by Lucille Han

== 38th Awards (2014) ==
A total of 1791 books, magazines and digital publications submitted for 22 awards. New awards were introduced: for book editing, design, illustration, excellent publication recommendations.

Special Contribution Award: Rex How (founder of Locus Publishing Co)

Book Publication of the Year: Voices Refusing to Be Forgotten: An Oral History on the Environmental Record of Radio Corporation of America in Taiwan (published by Flaneur Culture Lab and CommonWealth Parenting by CommonWealth Group.

Best Education and Learning Magazine: CommonWealth Parenting

== 6th Awards (1982) ==
Prizes were awarded in fourteen categories across books, journalism, magazines, and phonographs.

Book category

Book award:

- Three Hundred Years of Taiwan (ed. Huang Tien-ching)
- The Music Student’s Encyclopaedia (ed. Hsu Chang-hui)
- A Treasury of Chinese Classics (ed. Kao Shang-ching)

Magazine category
Editor’s award:

- Sun Hsiao-ying of Young Lion
- Kuo Ming-yen and Wu Hwei-kuo of Popular Science
- Liu Hsu-hwa of Crown

Art design award

- Huang Nan-hui – Tomorrow’s World Magazine
