= Sky Lovers (film) =

- Directed by: Jiang Qinmin
- Written by: Xi Dong (novel)
- Starring: Liu Ye; Dong Jie; Feng Enhe; Tao Hong
- Cinematography: Dan Shao
- Release date: 2002
- Running time: 93 min.
- Country: China
- Languages: Mandarin; Shanghainese

Sky Lovers (simplified Chinese: 天上的恋人; traditional Chinese: 天上的戀人) is a 2002 film based on the novel "Life Without Language" by Xi Dong which won the first Lu Xun Literature Award. It was directed by Jiang Qinmin.

== Cast ==
- Liu Ye- Jia Kuan, an incredibly deaf villager who also suggests an air of being slightly mentally challenged
- Dong Jie- Yu Chen, a mute girl
- Feng Enhe (冯恩鹤) - Jia Kuan's father
- Tao Hong- Zhu Ling

== Plot ==
The story is based in a remote village in the mountainous area of Guangxi. The story begins after the takeover of the Communists with Jia Kuan's father (Feng Enhe) accidentally triggering his gun, thus blinding himself permanently. The village boys see a stranger, Yu Chen (Dong Jie), and they believe she is the one who caused his injury, so they raise an alarm and pursue her. She runs through the fields of barley, and finds herself face to face with Jia Kuan (Liu Ye). Jia Kuan's demeanor is friendly and he smiles at her. The village boys catch up and start yelling to Jia Kuan that this girl harmed his father. Yu Chen cannot defend herself, as she is a mute. Luckily Jia Kuan doesn't believe them, so they all go to Jia Kuan's house to confirm it with Jia Kuan's father, who inevitably confirms that he had hurt himself by accident.

From this incident, Yu Chen begins to live with Jia Kuan and his father. She cooks for them, and takes on a small maternal role in their family. Because Jia Kuan's father is blind and Yu Chen is mute, she communicates to him by writing words onto Jia Kuan's father's hand. It is by these small interactions that Jia Kuan's father discovers that Yu Chen was in the area because she was looking for her brother, as her parents had died.

From here the story carries on without further exploring Yu Chen's background. Jia Kuan is in love with Zhu Ling, the village beauty, and in his childish manner aims to gain her love, however Zhu Ling is not interested in Jia Kuan. Instead she carries on an affair with the only educated man living in the district.

== Awards ==
Best Artistic Contribution Award at the 15th Tokyo International Film Festival
