= Sound of Colors (book) =

Book by Jimmy Liao

- Author: Jimmy Liao
- Original title: 地下鐵
- Translator: Sarah L. Thomson (2006)
- Language: Chinese
- Genre: children's picture book
- Published: 2001, Locus Publishing
- Publication place: Taiwan

Sound of Colors
- Traditional Chinese: 地下鐵
- Simplified Chinese: 地下铁
- Literal meaning: Underground Railway
Transcriptions
Standard Mandarin
- Hanyu Pinyin: Dì Xià Tiě

Sound of Colors is a 2001 Taiwanese children's picture book written and illustrated by Jimmy Liao. The Chinese title means "subway", and the book follows a blind girl's imaginations as she rides the city's rapid transit. The book was translated to English by Sarah L. Thomson and published in 2006 as The Sound of Colors.

== Reception ==
Publishers Weekly wrote the book "offers a meditation on blindness that will stay with readers long after they have closed the paper-over-board book".

== Translations ==
English
The Sound of Colors: A Journey of the Imagination. Translated by Sarah L. Thomson. Little, Brown and Company. 2006.
Japanese
Chikatetsu (地下鉄). Translated by Noriko Housako. Shogakukan. 2002.
Korean
Jihacheol (지하철). Translated by Baek Eun-young. Samtoh Publishing. 2004.
Thai
Nai čhai klai kūa sāitā (ในใจ...ไกลกว่าสายตา). Translated by Prathumphō̜n Tangkunthawat. Nanmee Books. 2004.
Spanish
El sonido de los colores. Translated by Jordi Ainaud i Escudero. Barbara Fiore Editora. 2008.
French
Le son des couleurs. Translated by Stéphane Levêque. Bayard Jeunesse. 2009.
Italian
La voce dei colori. Translated by Silvia Torchio. Edizioni Gruppo Abele. 2011.
Polish
Dźwięki kolorów. Translated by Katarzyna Sarek. Officyna. 2012.
Dutch
De klank van kleuren: een reis van de verbeelding. Translated by Elske Kampen. Eduforce. 2013.
Vietnamese
Âm thanh của sắc màu. Translated by Nguyễn Lệ Chi. Kim Đồng Publishing House. 2014.
Swedish
Färgernas ljud. Translated by Anna Gustafsson Chen. Bokförlaget Mirando. 2016.

== Adaptations ==
- Sound of Colors, a 2003 film directed by Joe Ma, starring Miriam Yeung, Tony Leung Chiu-wai, Dong Jie and Chang Chen
- Sound of Colors, a 2006 TV series directed by Zhang Min, starring Ruby Lin, Wallace Huo, Hao Lei and Huang Meng
