= The Last Goodbye to Mama =

- Promotional poster
- Chinese: 您好！母亲大人
- Hanyu Pinyin: Nín hǎo! Mǔqīn dàrén
- Genre: Family, Drama
- Based on: On the Cloud: 99 Things with My Mom by Bu Liangsheng (Ding Xiaojun)
- Written by: Gong Xue
- Directed by: Cao Dun; Jing Chong
- Starring: Dong Jie; Yin Fang; Lu Fangsheng; Wang Churan
- Country of origin: China
- Original language: Mandarin
- No. of episodes: 30

Production
- Executive producer: Zhang A Tong
- Production companies: Youku Information Technology (Beijing) Co., Ltd. Shandong Magic Eye Film Co., Ltd.

Original release
- Network: Youku; Tencent Video; IQIYI
- Release: October 13 – November 10, 2021

The Last Goodbye to Mama (Chinese: 您好！母亲大人) is a 2021 Chinese drama streaming television series directed by Cao Dun and Jing Chong, and starring Dong Jie, Yin Fang, Lu Fangsheng and Wang Churan. The story revolves around a mother and her son in the little town of Subei, spanning thirty years. It was aired on Youku, IQIYI and Tencent Video from October 13 to November 10, 2021.

== Plot ==
Ding Xiaojun (Yin Fang), who has lived with his mother Ding Biyun (Dong Jie) in a small city in the north of Jiangsu since childhood, was accepted into a university in Shanghai at the age of 18. Warning about failure to graduate. Ding Xiaojun hid from his mother until he had an accident and met Yu Ya. At the same time, with the encouragement of his mother, Ding Xiaojun encouraged his spirit and graduated excellently. Ding Xiaojun became a Shanghai drifter, but was tricked into going to Japan to experience "the vagrant life" for several months. He realizes that his mother's life is not easy, and returns to China after reconciling with her mother by crossing the ocean. On New Year's Eve 2010, Ding Xiaojun received a job offer from a Beijing company, and his long-planned trip to Shanghai will also come to fruition. He arranged for Yu Ya and his mother to meet in Shanghai, hoping to take this opportunity to say goodbye to the old days and welcome the new to his vibrant youth. Draw a complete landing. But on this day, the two most important women will leave him, especially his mother Ding Biyun, who was diagnosed with tumor and bone metastasis. Since then, Ding Xiaojun gave up wandering and broke up with Yu Ya, and returned to his mother.....

== Cast ==
=== Main ===
- Dong Jie as Ding Biyun
- Yin Fang as Ding Xiaojun
  - Gu Wenze as Ding Xiaojun (young)

=== Supporting ===
- Lu Fangsheng as Hai Zhong
- Zhao Wei as Fu Qiang
- Cai Lu as Ding Jianhua
- Chen Yuwen as Yin Yi
- Jiang Xueming as Xu Tian
- Wang Churan as Yu Ya
- Qu Shanshan as Ding Bixia
- Gong Lei as Pang Hu's father
- Zhang Yao as Cui Shanshan
- Du Shuangyu
- Zeng Qi as Fang Fang
- Ran Xu as Qin Keran
- Gong Zhengye as Wu Hua

== Reception ==
The Last Goodbye to Mama received mainly positive reviews. Douban gave the drama 8.1 out of 10.

Luo Jianhui, former director of the National Radio and Television Administration and vice president of the China Netcasting Services Association (CNSA), stated: "The Last Goodbye to Mama is an "enjoyable" TV series, which has created a glorious image of Chinese women with traditional virtues" Dong Jie's performance also received a lot of praise for playing an emotional mother while she and Yin Fang (the actor who played Ding Biyun's son - Ding Xiaojun) had only 6 years apart. The series was also commended for its parallel storytelling that intertwines past and present, as scenes narrate the dual life of the 1980s and life in the society of the 1990s.

== Broadcast ==
Region	Network	Dates	Notes
China (local)	Youku; Tencent Video; IQIYI	13 October 2021 - 10 November 2021 (Every Wednesday, Thursday, Friday)	Original
Vietnam	TV360	13 October 2021 - 10 November 2021	With Vietnamese subtitle
Selected countries in the Americas, Europe, Middle East, South Asia	Viki	Starting from October 14, 2021	With various subtitles
