= Sound of Colors (film) =

2003 Hong Kong film by Joe Ma

- Theatrical release poster
- Directed by: Joe Ma
- Screenplay by: Joe Ma; Cheung Pui Wah; Sunny Chan
- Based on: Sound of Colors by Jimmy Liao
- Produced by: Wong Kar-wai; Jacky Pang Yee-Wah
- Starring: Tony Leung; Miriam Yeung
- Cinematography: Chienn Hsiang; Ko Chiu-lam
- Edited by: Angie Lam
- Music by: Lincoln Lo
- Production company: Jet Tone Films Production
- Release date: December 20, 2003
- Running time: 97 minutes
- Country: Hong Kong
- Language: Cantonese
- Box office: HK$14.2 million

Sound of Colors (Chinese: 地下鐵) is a 2003 Hong Kong romantic comedy film directed by Joe Ma and starring Tony Leung and Miriam Yeung. It is an adaptation of the Taiwanese children's picture book of the same name by Jimmy Liao.

== Premise ==
The film tells a story about friendship and love. There are no villains among the characters, only Ho Yuk-ming, the founder of a dating agency, has a complicated personality. He is overly proud and lies often, but he is still essentially a good person.

== Cast ==
- Tony Leung Chiu-wai as Ho Yuk-ming, the untrustworthy owner of a dating agency who inextricably goes blind
- Miriam Yeung as Cheung Hoi-Yeuk, a kind blind woman who visits a dating agency in search for love
- Chang Chen as Zhong Cheng, an advertising company sales representative in Taipei whose love letter gets sent to an incorrect address
- Dong Jie as Dong Lie, a Shanghainese businesswoman who receives the love letter
- Wing Fan, angel who sets up Zhong Cheng and Dong Lie
- Gwei Lun-Mei (cameo)

== Reception ==
Yen Sun-lun for the Taipei Times wrote, "Unfortunately, the film has turned out to be a colourful and beautiful picture that looks like an extended version of a music video. It may be creative in creating characters and plot for the originally thinly-plotted illustration book and the performances are on the whole OK, but the result is less than the sum of its parts." Ken Eisner for Variety wrote, "Tale of overlapping love stories, “Sound of Colors” finally lacks the complexity or zip to make it shine as brightly as it otherwise could." Chan Ka-ming for the Hong Kong Film Critics Society said, "Granted there is some Joe Ma humour, but the tumbling pursuit is nothing but the channeling of Wong Kar-wai."

== Analysis ==
賓尼 for the Hong Kong Film Critics Society wrote that the film's happy ending differs from other films of the period, whose cynical themes act as a reflection of Hong Kong's anxieties of the post 1997 Hong Kong Handover. The author noted the parallels of the two romances as a larger examination of gender dynamics in Hong Kong and Cross-Strait relations. Specifically, the author noted Ho's sudden blindness as a loss of confidence by men in Hong Kong following recent economic turmoil. This is contrasted with Cheung's confidence as a blind person as a reflection of the rising social standing of women in Hong Kong. Alternatively, Zhong Cheng and Dong Lie's successful romance as lovers from different countries is wishful thinking of improved relations between China and Taiwan.

== Awards and nominations ==
Year	Award	Category	Nominee	Result	Ref.
2003	Golden Bauhinia Awards	Best Actress	Miriam Yeung	Nominated	
2004	Hundred Flowers Awards	Best Picture	Sound of Colors	Nominated	
2004	Hundred Flowers Awards	Best Actress	Dong Jie	Nominated	
2004	Chinese Film Media Awards	Best Actor	Tony Leung Chiu-wai	Nominated	

== See also ==
- Turn Left, Turn Right — 2003 Hong Kong romance film also adapted from a Jimmy Liao book
