= Dong Jie =

Chinese actress and dancer

- Born: 19 April 1980 (age 46); Dalian, Liaoning, China
- Other name: Angel Dong
- Education: People's Liberation Army Academy of Art
- Occupations: Actress; dancer
- Years active: 2000–present
- Agent(s): Tibet Mulight Media Co., Ltd.
- Spouse: Pan Yueming (m. 2008; div. 2012)
- Children: 1

Chinese name
- Traditional Chinese: 董潔
- Simplified Chinese: 董洁
Transcriptions
Standard Mandarin
- Hanyu Pinyin: Dǒng Jié

Dong Jie (Chinese: 董洁, born 19 April 1980) is a Chinese actress and dancer. Dong made her debut in Zhang Yimou's Happy Times (2000). Her other notable works include Sky Lovers (2002), The Story of a Noble Family (2003), Endless Love (2004), 2046 (2004) and Dragon Tiger Gate (2006).

== Personal life ==
In 2008, Dong married actor Pan Yueming and gave birth to a son a year later. They divorced in 2012.

== Filmography ==
=== Film ===
Year	English title	Chinese title	Role	Notes
2000	Happy Times	幸福时光	Wu Ying	
2002	Sky Lovers	天上的恋人	Cai Yuzhen	
2003	Sound of Colors	地下铁	Dong Ling	
2004	Last Love, First Love	最后的爱，最初的爱	Fang Lin	
2004	2046		Wang Jiewen	
2005	Youthful Interpretation	青春演绎	Shen Xi'er	
2006	Dragon Tiger Gate	龙虎门	Ma Xiaoling	
2006	Love of Tangbula Grasslands	唐布拉之恋	Lin Xiao	
2008	How Yukong Moved the Mountains	愚公移山	Wang Youdeng (young)	
2011	The Founding of a Party	建党伟业	Soong Ching-ling	
2011	The Seal of Love	秋之白华	Yang Zhihua	
2016	Three Weddings	爸爸的3次婚礼	Qian Xiaojing	
2021	Assassin in Red	刺杀小说家		Cameo
2026	Zoom In, Zoom Out	发现之旅	Director	Critics’ Week section

=== Television series ===
Year	English title	Chinese title	Role	Notes
2002	White Collar Condominium	白领公寓	Ren Fei'er	
2002	Triple Door	三重门	Susan	
2003	The Story of a Noble Family	金粉世家	Leng Qingqiu	
2003	Flying Daggers	飞刀，又见飞刀	Fang Keke	
2004	Endless Love	天若有情	Zhan Yan	
2004	Early Spring	早春二月	Tao Lan	
2005	Endless Love 2	天若有情2	Zhan Yan	
2006	Hong Yi Fang	红衣坊	Kawakami Yoko	
2007	Butterfly Lovers	梁山伯與祝英台	Zhu Yingtai	
2008	Torn Between Two Lovers	還君明珠	Jin Mingzhu	
2008	Legend of the Fist: Chen Zhen	精武陈真	Fang Zhixin	
2010	You Are My Brother	你是我的兄弟	Hua Leilei	
2010	Tracking Nights Phantom	萍踪侠影	Yun Lie	
2011	Please Forgive Me	请你原谅我	Mei Guo	
2014	Allure Snow	倾城雪	Jiang Jiayuan	
2014	Ten Years of Love	相爱十年	Han Ling	
2015	Tiger Mom	虎妈猫爸	Tang Lin	
2017	Love in Nanjing	南京爱情	Lin Yuhui	
2017	White Deer Plain	白鹿原	Zhang Zijun	Cameo
2018	Secret of the Three Kingdoms	三国机密	Tang Ying	
2018	Ruyi's Royal Love in the Palace	如懿傳	Fuca·Langhua	
2018	The Family	幸福一家人	Fang Tianxin	
2019	One Dream One Home	澳门人家	Liang Shu	
2020	With You	在一起	Meng Jie	
2021	Medal of the Republic	功勋	Deng Zhe	
2021	The Last Goodbye to Mama	您好！母亲大人	Ding Biyun	
2021	Sword, Snow, Stride	雪中悍刀行	Wu Su	
2022	Mom Wow	加油！妈妈	He Xiaohan	
2023	Echo	回响	Bei Zhen	
2023	Thin Ice	薄冰	Gu Manli	
2023	Imperfect Victim	不完美受害人	Li Yi	
2024	The Legend of Shen Li	与凤行	Yun Niang	
2024	Shooting Stars	群星闪耀时	Ji Mengqiu (Mrs. Ji) / Tao Lanxin	
2024	In Between	半熟男女	Zeng Cheng	
2024	Blossoms in Dream	花开如梦	Xian/Zhi	
TBA	The Knot	云水谣	Wang Biyun	
TBA	Love is Leaving	安娜的爱人	Zheng Huizhu	
TBA	Beautiful Era	美好的时代		

== Awards and nominations ==
Year	Award	Category	Nominated work	Result	Ref.
2001	7th Huabiao Awards	Outstanding New Actress	Happy Times	Won	
2001	24th Hundred Flowers Awards	Best Actress	Happy Times	Nominated	
2002	47th Valladolid International Film Festival	Best Actress	Happy Times	Won	
2002	2nd Chinese Film Media Awards	Best Actress	Happy Times	Nominated	
2004	27th Hundred Flowers Awards	Best Actress	Sound of Colors	Nominated	
2015	8th China TV Drama Awards	Best Supporting Actress	Tiger Mom	Won	
2016	22nd Shanghai Television Festival	Best Supporting Actress	Tiger Mom	Nominated	
2018	11th China TV Drama Awards	Best Actress	The Family	Nominated	
2018	11th China TV Drama Awards	Outstanding Leading Actress	The Family	Won	
2019	6th The Actors of China Award Ceremony	Best Actress (Sapphire Category)	The Family	Nominated	
2020	7th The Actors of China Award Ceremony	Best Actress (Sapphire)	—N/a	Nominated	
2023	14th Macau International Television Festival	Best Supporting Actress	Imperfect Victim	Nominated	
2024	7th Television Series of China Quality Ceremony	Quality Stylish Actor of the Year	Imperfect Victim	Won	
