= Xie Jin =

Chinese film director (1923–2008)

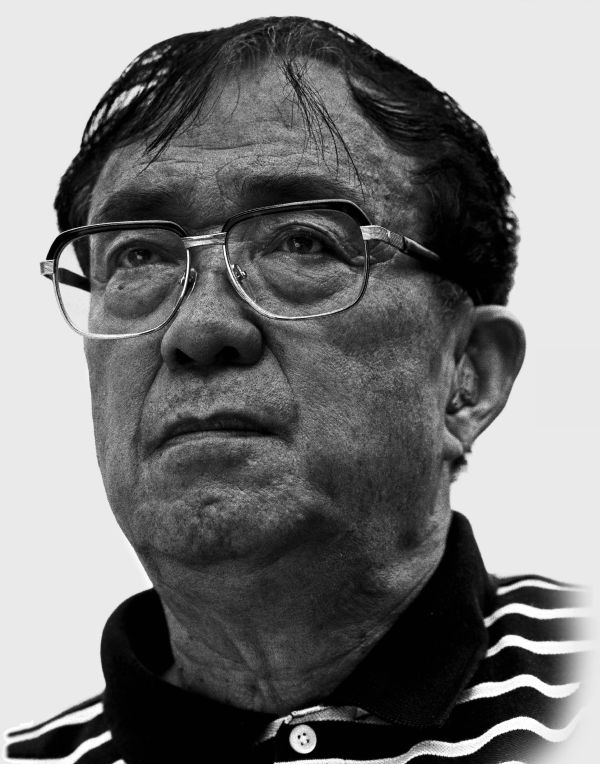
- Born: 21 November 1923; Shangyu, Zhejiang, China
- Died: 18 October 2008 (aged 84); Shangyu
- Occupation: Film director
- Awards: Karlovy Vary International Film Festival – Crystal Globe for Hibiscus Town (1988) Golden Rooster Awards – Best Director for Legend of Tianyun Mountain (1980); Best Picture for Legend of Tianyun Mountain (1980), Hibiscus Town (1987) & The Opium War (1997); Lifetime Achievement Award (2005) Hundred Flowers Awards – Best Director for The Red Detachment of Women (1962)

Chinese name
- Traditional Chinese: 謝晉
- Simplified Chinese: 谢晋
Transcriptions
Standard Mandarin
- Hanyu Pinyin: Xiè Jìn

Xie Jin (Chinese: 谢晋; 21 November 1923 – 18 October 2008) was a Chinese film director. He rose to prominence in 1957, directing the film Woman Basketball Player No. 5, and was considered one of the Third Generation directors of China. Most recently he was known for the direction of The Opium War (1997).

Xie was a popular director amongst the older generations of Chinese, with six of his films being voted Best Picture in the Hundred Flowers Awards. He was the only Chinese director to date to be a member of both the Academy of Motion Picture Arts and Sciences as well as the Directors Guild of America.

== Biography ==
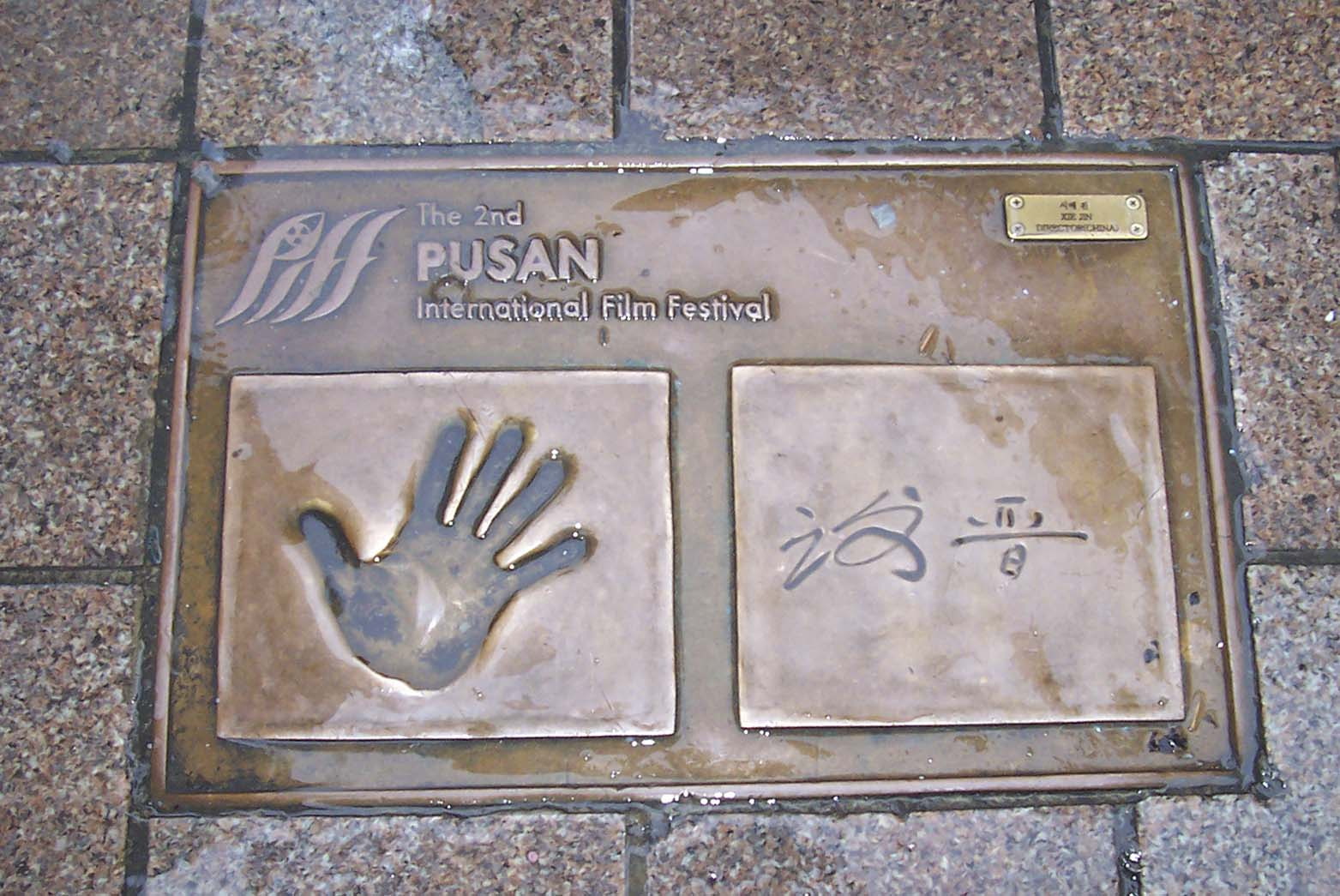
Xie Jin plaque in Busan.

Xie was born in Shangyu, Zhejiang Province. He spent his childhood in his hometown, and attended primary school for one year there. In the 1930s, he moved to Shanghai with his parents and continued his education. In 1938, he followed his father to Hong Kong and studied there for one year. When returning to Shanghai in 1939, Xie enrolled in Daxia Affiliated High School and Jishan High School. In leisure time, Xie took courses at Huaguang Drama School and Jinxing Film Training School. His teachers included Huang Zuolin and Wu Renzhi. Meanwhile, he participated students drama activities led by Yu Ling, and acted as Yue Yun in multi-stage play Yue Yun.

In 1941, Xie enrolled in the play department of Jiang'an National Drama School in Sichuan, and was educated by Cao Yu, Hong Shen, Jiao Juyin, Ma Yanxiang, Chen Liting, among other notable figures. In 1943, he voluntarily ceased his study and started working in China Youth Play Agency in Chongqing, and became stage manager, scenario writer and actor. In 1946, Xie reassumed his study at National Drama School in Nanjing, majoring in directing. In 1948, he entered Datong Film Corporation and became assistant director, and associate director.

After establishment of PRC, Xie enrolled in the research institute of politics of North China Revolutionary University. Later, he became an associate director and a director in Changjiang Film Studio and Shanghai Film Studio.

Xie directed more than 20 films in his career. His debut work, Woman Basketball Player No. 5, was the first color sports film in PRC, and won the silver prize in 6th International Youth Film Festival in 1957, and the Silver Hat Prize in Mexico International Film Week in 1958. He staged the original production of the Chinese revolutionary opera, On the Docks in the early 1960s and also filmed the story in 1972.

The Red Detachment of Women won the Best Picture and Best Directing of the 1st Hundred Flowers Awards, and it also won the Wanlong Prize of 3rd Asia-Africa Film Festival in 1964.

Two Stage Sisters was released in 1965 and in 1980 won the Sutherland Trophy at the 24th BFI London Film Festival. It also won prizes in Portugal and Manila international film festivals. However, it was attacked in his home country because it "advocated the reconciliation of social classes." Xie recalled in the 2002 interview that his parents committed suicide amid the political pressure — his mother jumping off a building and his father overdosing on sleeping pills — and he had to collect their bodies himself.

Jia Zhangke remarked it was still risky for Xie to make films about this traumatic period in the 1980s, which he did, when China had started to open up and implement economic reforms.

On 23 August 2008, Xie Jin's son died of cancer. Two months later, on the morning of 18 October 2008, Xie Jin's body was discovered in his hotel room in Shangyu. Hundreds of celebrities and thousands of other people attended his funeral. After he died, Song Zude, known as the King of Media Hype in mainland China, made a series of derogatory statements about Xie Jin. Millions of people stood against Song Zude in respect of the late Xie Jin.

== Filmography ==
Year	English Title	Chinese Title	Notes
1957	Woman Basketball Player No. 5	女篮五号	
1961	The Red Detachment of Women	红色娘子军	Hundred Flowers Award for Best Director
1962	Big Li, Little Li and Old Li	大李，小李和老李	
1965	Two Stage Sisters	舞台姐妹	Sutherland Trophy (British Film Institute)
1975	Chunmiao	春苗	
1977	Youth	青春	
1979	Cradle	啊！摇篮	
1980	Legend of Tianyun Mountain	天云山传奇	Golden Rooster Award for Best Director
1982	The Herdsman	牧马人	
1984	Qiu Jin	秋瑾	
1985	Wreaths at the Foot of the Mountain	高山下的花环	Nominated - Golden Rooster Award for Best Director
1986	Hibiscus Town	芙蓉镇	Crystal Globe (Karlovy Vary International Film Festival); Nominated - Golden Rooster Award for Best Director; Nominated - Golden Rooster Award for Best Writing
1989	The Last Aristocrats	最后的贵族	
1992	Bell of Purity Temple	清凉寺的钟声	
1993	An Old Man and His Dog	老人和狗	
1996	Penitentiary Angel	女儿谷	Also known as Behind the Wall of Shame
1997	The Opium War	鸦片战争	Nominated - Golden Rooster Award for Best Director
2001	Woman Soccer Player No. 9	女足九号	
