= Jimmy Liao =

Taiwanese writer and artist

Jimmy Liao 幾米
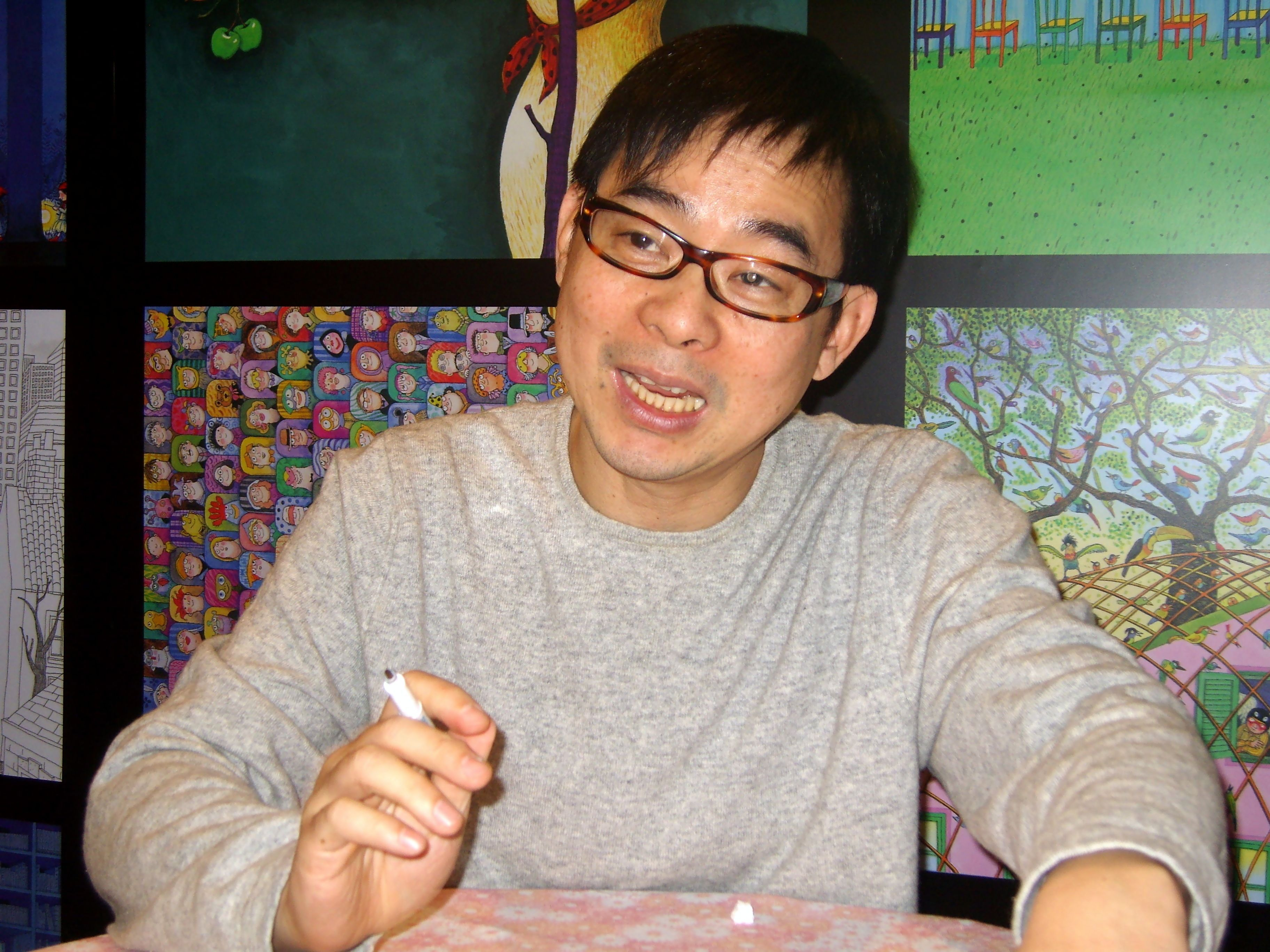
- Liao at the 2008 Taipei International Book Exhibition
- Born: Fubin Liao (廖福彬); 15 November 1958 (age 68) Yilan County, Taiwan
- Area: Writer
- Notable works: Turn Left, Turn Right; Sound of Colors; Starry Starry Night; The Floating Landscape
- Spouse: Peng Chienwen

Jimmy Liao (Chinese: 廖福彬; pinyin: Liào Fúbīn; pen name: 幾米, pinyin: Jǐmǐ; born 15 November 1958) is a Taiwanese illustrator as well as a picture book writer. His Chinese pen name (幾米) is phonetically derived from his English given name Jimmy.

== Biography ==
After graduating from Chinese Culture University in which he majored in art, Jimmy worked in an advertising company for twelve years, and then he worked as an illustrator for newspapers and magazines. Jimmy was a middle-aged man who had survived a battle with leukemia in 1995 and was determined to devote himself heart and soul to his art. In 1998 his picture books Secrets In The Forest (森林裡的秘密) and A Fish With A Smile (微笑的魚) were published in Taiwan. These two books earned him several book awards and were regarded as "The Best Children's Books" in several Taiwanese newspapers, such as The China Times, Min Sheng Bao, and United Daily News. His picture book A Chance of Sunshine or Turn Left, Turn Right (向左走, 向右走), which was published in 1999, was voted "One of the Ten Most Influential Books" by the Taiwanese bookstore chain, Kingstones. Jimmy's books have been translated into dozens of languages and sold around the world. His books have also been adapted for theater, movie, television, and animation. Many of his characters from his picture books have been applied to the making of dolls and pictures on other authorized products, notably leather purses. His pictures are characterized by their use of striking, bold colours and depict central figures that often appear small in the foreground, suggesting the viewpoint of a child in the wide, sometimes sinister, world, or to hint at loneliness. In June 2019, Jimmy Liao was the Guest of Honor of the Comicfestival in Munich, Germany.

== Publications ==
- Beautiful Solitude
- Sound of Colors, translated by Sarah L. Thomson (Little, Brown and Company, 2006).
- Starry Starry Night
- The Floating Landscape
- The Rainbow of Time, translated by Wang Xinlin and Andrea Lingenfelter (Balestier Press, 2015) ISBN 978-0-9932154-3-8
- Turn Left, Turn Right
- When the Moon Forgot, translated to English in 2009 and published by Little, Brown and Company.
