= Plum Blossom Award =

Chinese theatre award

The China Theatre Plum Blossom Award (simplified Chinese: 中国戏剧梅花奖; traditional Chinese: 中國戲劇梅花獎; pinyin: Zhōngguó Xìjù Méihuā Jiǎng), more commonly the Plum Blossom Award, is the highest theatrical award in China. It is awarded by the China Theatre Association.

Several Taiwanese have also won the award, such as Wei Hai-min.

== History ==
The Plum Blossom Award was founded in 1983 by Liu Housheng, Vice President of the China Theatre Association, and his colleagues.

In 1994, the China Theatre Association began awarding Second Plum Blossom Prizes to distinguished performers who had already won the prize once. In 2002, the Association began the policy of awarding the Plum Blossom Grand Prize to performers who had won the prize twice previously and continued to be active and innovative in the field. There have been four winners of that award to date: Shang Changrong in 2002, Song Guofeng and Mao Weitao in 2007, and Pei Yanling in 2009. The Plum Blossom Prize has been awarded every two years since 2005, as opposed to every year as it was previously. Due to the promulgation of the "Administration of Art, Journalism, and Publishing Awards" circular by the Ministry of Culture in 2005, the number of such awards was reduced, and the Plum Blossom Prize was combined with another prize. Beginning in 2009, the selection process for the Plum Blossom Prize was changed into a televised competition among fifty hopefuls.

== Controversy ==
In 1992, actress Song Dandan refused to accept the Plum Blossom Prize that she had been awarded because of what she called "the scandal of corruption and lies behind the selection process".

== Recipients ==
=== Western genres ===
- 1984 (1st)
  - Spoken theatre: Li Xuejian, Shang Lijuan, Liu Wenzhi, Feng Xianzhen, Jiang Baoying
- 1985 (2nd)
  - Spoken theatre: Zhou Ling, Su Jinbang, Li Bangyu, Liang Yan, Luo Lige
  - Opera: Ji Xiaoqin, Pang Xinhua
- 1986 (3rd)
  - Spoken theatre: Wang Ling, Ding Jiali, Zhang Jiazhao, Shan Zenghong
  - Opera: Peng Liyuan, Li Xiaohu
- 1987 (4th)
  - Spoken theatre: Lü Xiaohe, Wang Yu, Liang Guanhua, Zhang Guoli, Wen Yujuan
  - Opera: Yang Hongji
- 1988 (5th)
  - Spoken theatre: Xi Meijuan, Song Guofeng, Ye Mang, Han Tongsheng, Zhang Qiuge
  - Opera: Liu Weiwei
- 1989 (6th)
  - Spoken theatre: Liu Yuan, Wei Zi, Song Jie, Li Fang, Lu Zhiqi
  - Opera: Wan Shanhong, Guo Weimin
- 1990 (7th)
  - Spoken theatre: Jia Zhanhong, Zhang Zhizhong, Yang Qing, Wei Ji'an, Tan Zongyao
  - Opera: Zhang Jimin, Chen Su'e
- 1991 (8th)
  - Spoken theatre: Liu Xiaoming
- 1992 (9th)
  - Spoken theatre: Ning Cai, Li Qi, Yang Shutian, Wu Shanshan, Song Dandan, Zhong Hao, Xia Jun, Zhai Wanchen, Pu Cunxin
  - Opera: Jin Man, Gu Xin, Tang Dejun
- 1993 (10th)
  - Spoken theatre: Wang Liyun, Wang Xueqi, Wang Xiaomei, Liu Yan, Jia Lingzhen
  - Opera: Mi Dongfeng, Qin Lufeng
- 1994 (11th)
  - Spoken theatre: Zhu Yin, Zhou Hong, Ma Lu, Lu Liang
  - Opera: An Jinyu
- 1995 (12th)
  - Spoken theatre: Zhang Jiumei, Zhao Liang, Wang Lihua, Cai Jinping
  - Opera: Lei Yan
- 1996 (13th)
  - Spoken theatre: Yang Shuquan, Xu Fan, Xia Zhiqing, Yang Niansheng, Wang Yanbo
  - Opera: Han Yanwen
- 1997 (14th)
  - Spoken theatre: Yin Zhusheng, Tashi Dondrup, Liu Meihua, Wu Jing'an, Qi Lihua
  - Opera: Che Ying, Sun Liying, Yao Hong
  - Dance: Zhang Dandan
- 1998 (15th)
  - Spoken theatre: Zhang Teng, Ning Xiaozhi, Zhang Lijun, Zhang Yechuan, Zhang Jinyuan
  - Opera: Cheng Guilan, Li Caiqin
  - Dance: Liu Jing, Yang Xia, Jin Baolong, Shan Chong, Zhao Qing
- 1999 (16th)
  - Spoken theatre: Li Shanshan, Yang Chunrong, Li Jinghui, He Bing
  - Opera: Wang Jing
- 2000 (17th)
  - Spoken theatre: Song Guofeng (2nd win), Ding Jiali (2nd win), Ni Dahong, Wu Jun, Sun Honglei, Sun Haiying, Kang Aishi, Wang Yao, Zhang Zhizhong, Li Lan, Ma Xiaomao, Xiao Hong
  - Opera: Sun Yi, Li Haizhen, Chen Shumin
- 2001 (18th)
  - Spoken theatre: Liang Guanhua (2nd win), Wang Hong, Wu Yanlin, Yin Yanping, Wen Liqin, Wang Weiguo, Zhang Kaili, Leng Jiahua
- 2002 (19th)
  - Spoken theatre: Pu Cunxin (2nd win), Zhang Teng (2nd win), Chen Xiguang, Qiang Yin, Tian Shui, Xiao Xiong, Ding Xiaohan, Wang Yang, Gao Xia, Jia Yulan, Zhang Lu
  - Opera: Wang Hui
  - Musical: Zheng Qiang
- 2003 (20th)
  - Spoken theatre: Yang Lixin, Zhang Fengyi, Zhu Heng, Zeng Yongjun, Yao Jude
  - Opera: Liu Yanyan
- 2004 (21st)
  - Spoken theatre: He Bing (2nd win), Wang Xiaoying
  - Opera: Dai Yuqiang
- 2005 (22nd)
  - Spoken theatre: Feng Yuanzheng, Hao Ping, Wang Xiaoling, Hou Bingyu
  - Opera: Sun Jian, Liu Danli
  - Musical: Song Zuying
- 2007 (23rd)
  - Spoken theatre: Feng Xianzhen (2nd win), Sun Tao
  - Opera: Lü Jihong
- 2009 (24th)
  - Spoken theatre: Ai Ping, Liu Xiaocui
  - Opera: Zhang Lihui
- 2011 (25th)
  - Spoken theatre: Feng Ruili
- 2013 (26th)
  - Spoken theatre: Zhang Qiuge (2nd win), Yuan Quan, Zhang Yanqiu, Wang Ban
  - Opera: Chen Xiaoduo
- 2015 (27th)
  - Spoken theatre: Zhu Heng (2nd win), Hou Yansong, Guo Guangping, Tang Yan
  - Opera: Du Huan
- 2017 (28th)
  - Spoken theatre: Zhao Xu
- 2019 (29th)
  - Spoken theatre: Xin Baiqing
  - Opera: Lei Jia

=== Peking opera ===
Name	Award year	Gender	Troupe	Role type
Shang Changrong	1985, 1996, 2002	Male	Shaanxi Company; Shanghai Company	Jing
Zhu Shihui	1989, 2000	Male	Hubei Company	Chou
Huang Xiaoci	1990, 1999	Female	Jiangsu Company	Dan
Chen Lincang	1995, 1999	Male	Gansu Company	Jing
Meng Guanglu	1995, 2009	Male	Tianjin Youth	Jing
Wang Ping	1998, 2005	Male	Tianjin Company	Sheng
Liu Wei	2005, 2013	Female	Wuhan Company	Dan
Ye Shaolan	1984	Male	Beijing Military Region	Sheng
Liu Changyu	1984	Female	National Company	Dan
Li Weikang	1984	Female	National Company	Dan
Sun Yumin	1985	Female	Company of Beijing	Dan
Yang Shurui	1985	Female	Company of Beijing	Dan
Zhang Xuejin	1985	Male	Company of Beijing	Sheng
Chi Xiaoqiu	1985	Female	Fuxin Company	Dan
Wang Lijun	1986	Male	Tianjin Youth	Sheng
Yan Guixiang	1986	Female	Company of Beijing	Dan
Li Guang	1986	Male	National Company	Sheng
Lei Ying	1987	Female	Tianjin Youth	Dan
Wang Yulan	1987	Female	Liaoning Youth	Dan
Yang Zhifang	1988	Female	Songzi Company	Dan
Ma Yuzhang	1988	Male	Company of Beijing	Sheng
Song Danju	1988	Female	Company of Beijing	Dan
Zhao Baoxiu	1988	Female	Company of Beijing	Dan
Ma Shaoliang	1988	Male	Tianjin Company	Sheng
Ye Jinyuan	1989	Male	Company of Beijing	Sheng
Shen Jianjin	1989	Female	National Company	Dan
Yang Chunxia	1989	Female	National Company	Dan
Yu Kuizhi	1990	Male	National Company	Sheng
Xin Baoda	1990	Male	Beijing Military Region	Sheng
Yan Xingpeng	1990	Male	Shanghai Company	Sheng
Wang Shufang	1990	Female	Company of Beijing	Dan
Li Jingwen	1990	Female	Shenyang Company	Dan
Zhou Long	1990	Male	National Academy	Sheng
Zhang Youlin	1990	Male	Tianjin Company	Sheng
Yang Naipeng	1991	Male	Tianjin Company	Sheng
Xue Yaping	1991	Female	Shandong Company	Dan
Yang Chi	1991	Male	Dalian Company	Sheng
Wang Hai-bo	1991	Female	New Era Company	Jing
Deng Muwei	1992	Male	Tianjin Company	Jing
Xing Meizhu	1992	Female	Harbin Company	Dan
Li Jingwen	1993	Female	Tianjin Company	Dan
Chen Shufang	1993	Female	National Company	Dan
Hou Danmei	1993	Female	Guiyang Company	Dan
Guan Jinglan	1993	Female	Company of Beijing	Dan
Shi Min	1994	Female	Shanghai Company	Dan
Chen Shaoyun	1994	Male	Hunan Company	Sheng
Wang Rongrong	1994	Female	Company of Beijing	Dan
Qin Xueling	1994	Female	Company of Beijing	Dan
Li Ping	1995	Female	Dalian Company	Dan
Ju Xiaosu	1996	Female	Shandong Company	Dan
Li Shengsu	1996	Female	Shanxi Company	Dan
Wei Haimin	1996	Female	GuoGuang Company	Dan
Tang Yuancai	1997	Male	Shanghai Company	Jing
Zhang Yanling	1997	Female	Hebei Youth	Dan
Li Haiyan	1998	Female	National Company	Dan
Dong Cuina	1999	Female	Yantai Company	Dan
Zhao Xiujun	1999	Female	Tianjin Youth	Dan
Zhang Huoding	2000	Female	National Company	Dan
Liang Weiling	2000	Female	Hebei Company	Dan
Li Xuemei	2000	Female	Xuzhou Company	Dan
Zhang Ke	2000	Male	Tianjin Youth	Sheng
Li Hongtu	2001	Male	Company of Beijing	Sheng
Pei Yongjie	2001	Male	Jilin Company	Sheng
Dong Yuanyuan	2001	Female	Hong Kong Company	Dan
Zhao Yongwei	2001	Male	National Company	Sheng
Li Jie	2001	Female	Jiangsu Company	Dan
Geng Qiaoyun	2001	Female	National Company	Dan
Li Peihong	2001	Female	Tianjin Youth	Dan
Li Ding	2001	Male	Mudanjiang Company	Sheng
Song Changlin	2002	Male	Shandong Company	Jing
Zhang Jianguo	2002	Male	National Company	Sheng
Ai Jinmei	2002	Female	Jiangsu Company	Dan
Wang Guirong	2003	Female	Jinzhou Company	Dan
Zhang Huifang	2004	Female	Hubei Company	Dan
Shi Xiaoliang	2004	Male	Tianjin Youth	Chou
Yuan Huiqin	2004	Female	National Company	Dan
Chang Dong	2005	Male	Shenyang Company	Sheng
Du Zhenjie	2005	Male	Company of Beijing	Sheng
Zhang Huimin	2005	Female	Hebei Company	Dan
Yu Lan	2007	Female	Beijing Military Region	Dan
Zhang Junqiang	2007	Male	Chongqing Company	Sheng
Tian Lei	2009	Male	Fujian Company	Sheng
Ni Maocai	2009	Male	Jilin Company	Sheng
Wang Runjing	2009	Female	National Company	Dan
Liu Guijuan	2009	Female	Tianjin Youth	Dan
Ma Shaomin	2009	Female	Gansu Company	Dan
Wang Yan	2011	Female	Tianjin Company	Dan
An Ping	2011	Male	Shanghai Company	Jing
Bao Fei	2011	Male	Company of Beijing	Sheng
Wang Xiaochan	2011	Male	Hubei Company	Sheng
Zhao Yuhua	2011	Female	Shijiazhuang Company	Dan
Yan Wei	2011	Female	Tianjin Youth	Dan
Wang Peiyu	2011	Female	Shanghai Company	Sheng
Chang Qiuyue	2011	Female	Company of Beijing	Dan
Hu Chunhua	2011	Female	Yunnan Company	Dan
Li Qing	2011	Female	Jinan Company	Dan
Lü Yang	2013	Female	Tianjin Company	Dan
Jiang Yishan	2013	Female	Company of Beijing	Dan
Zhou Li	2013	Female	Chongqing Company	Dan
Liu Lu	2013	Female	Chengdu Company	Dan
Liu Jianjie	2013	Male	Shandong Company	Sheng
Sun Jingmei	2013	Female	Fujian Company	Dan
Fan Lexin	2013	Female	Nanjing Company	Dan
Zhang Xinyue	2015	Female	Company of Beijing	Dan
Ma Jia	2015	Female	Heilongjiang Company	Dan
Zhu Fu	2015	Male	Yunnan Company	Sheng
Wan Xiaohui	2015	Female	Hubei Company	Dan
Liu Jing	2015	Female	Ningxia Company	Dan
Jin Xiquan	2015	Male	Shanghai Company	Sheng
Zhang Jianfeng	2017	Male	Company of Beijing	Sheng
Zhang Huan	2019	Female	Heilongjiang Troupe	Dan
Fu Xiru	2019	Male	Shanghai Company	Sheng

=== Kunqu ===
Name	Award year	Gender	Troupe	Role type
Lin Weilin	1986, 2007	Male	Zhejiang Troupe	Sheng
Zhang Jingxian	1989, 2002	Female	Shanghai Troupe	Dan
Wang Fang	1995, 2005	Female	Suzhou Troupe	Dan
Zhang Jiqing	1984	Female	Jiangsu Company	Dan
Hong Xuefei	1985	Female	Northern Troupe	Dan
Hou Shaokui	1985	Male	Northern Troupe	Sheng
Wang Shiyu	1986	Male	Zhejiang Troupe	Sheng
Liang Guyin	1986	Female	Shanghai Troupe	Dan
Ji Zhenhua	1987	Male	Shanghai Troupe	Sheng
Hua Wenyi	1987	Female	Shanghai Troupe	Dan
Cai Zhenglan	1987	Male	Shanghai Troupe	Sheng
Zhang Jidie	1987	Male	Jiangsu Company	Chou
Yue Meiti	1987	Female	Shanghai Troupe	Sheng
Wang Zhiquan	1987	Female	Shanghai Troupe	Dan
Shi Xiaomei	1988	Female	Jiangsu Company	Sheng
Cai Yaoxi	1988	Female	Northern Troupe	Dan
Wang Fengmei	1988	Female	Zhejiang Troupe	Dan
Lin Jifan	1991	Male	Jiangsu Company	Chou
Hu Jinfang	1991	Female	Jiangsu Company	Dan
Huang Xiaowu	1992	Male	Jiangsu Company	Sheng
Zhang Zhihong	1995	Female	Zhejiang Troupe	Dan
Zhang Fuguang	1995	Male	Hunan Troupe	Sheng
Yang Fengyi	1995	Female	Northern Troupe	Dan
Liu Jing	1996	Female	Northern Troupe	Dan
Weng Guosheng	1997	Male	Zhejiang Troupe	Sheng
Wang Zhenyi	1999	Male	Northern Troupe	Sheng
Shi Hongmei	2000	Female	Northern Troupe	Dan
Fu Yiping	2002	Female	Hunan Troupe	Dan
Wei Chunrong	2004	Female	Northern Troupe	Dan
Ke Jun	2005	Male	Jiangsu Company	Sheng
Gu Haohao	2007	Female	Shanghai Troupe	Dan
Shen Fengying	2007	Female	Suzhou Troupe	Dan
Yu Jiulin	2007	Male	Suzhou Troupe	Sheng
Zhang Jun	2009	Male	Shanghai Troupe	Sheng
Kong Aiping	2009	Female	Jiangsu Company	Dan
Xing Jinsha	2009	Female	Hong Kong Academy	Dan
Li Hongliang	2011	Male	Jiangsu Company	Chou
Li An	2013	Male	Shanghai Troupe	Sheng
Lei Ling	2013	Female	Hunan Troupe	Dan
Liu Wei	2015	Female	Northern Troupe	Sheng
Wu Shuang	2015	Male	Shanghai Troupe	Jing
Zhou Xuefeng	2015	Male	Suzhou Troupe	Sheng
Shen Yili	2017	Female	Shanghai Troupe	Dan
Shan Wen	2019	Female	Jiangsu Company	Dan
Gu Weiying	2019	Female	Northern Troupe	Dan

=== Henan opera ===
Name	Award year	Gender	Troupe	Role type
Zhang Lan	1993, 2009	Female	Liaocheng Troupe	Dan
Li Shujian	1993, 2011	Male	Sanmenxia Troupe	Sheng
Wang Hongli	1995, 2003	Female	Henan Xiaohuanghou	Dan
Tang Yuying	1987	Female	Xiangyang Troupe	Dan
Wang Qingfen	1989	Female	Qingfen Troupe	Dan
Niu Shuxian	1990	Female	Handan Dongfeng	Dan
Hu Meiling	1990	Female	Zhengzhou Troupe	Dan
Hu Xiaofeng	1991	Female	Handan Dongfeng	Dan
Li Jinzhi	1991	Female	Shiyan Troupe	Dan
Li Xihua	1991	Female	Xiangyang Troupe	Dan
Gu Xiurong	1991	Female	Henan Troupe	Dan
Chen Shumin	1992	Female	Luoyang Troupe	Dan
Xiao Xiangyu	1993	Female	Taiyuan Troupe	Dan
Zhu Qiaoyun	1996	Female	Kaifeng Troupe	Dan
Zhou Hua	1996	Female	Lanzhou Troupe	Dan
Zhang Chunling	1998	Female	Shiyan Troupe	Dan
Zhu Guiqin	1999	Female	Shandong Qilu School	Dan
Yan Yongjiang	1999	Male	Pingdingshan Coal	Sheng
Jin Buhuan	2000	Male	Hebi Jinbuhuan	Chou
Miao Wenhua	2001	Female	Handan Dongfeng	Dan
Wang Quanzhen	2002	Female	Henan Troupe	Dan
Zhang Xiaodong	2002	Female	Suzhou Huaxia	Dan
Jia Wenlong	2003	Male	Puyang Troupe	Sheng
Li Xinhua	2003	Female	Jining Troupe	Dan
Yang Hongxia	2004	Female	Henan Troupe	Dan
Wang Hui	2007	Female	Wang Hui Studio	Dan
Liu Xiaoyan	2007	Female	Pingdingshan Troupe	Dan
Tian Min	2007	Female	Henan Troupe	Dan
Chen Xinqin	2009	Female	Shangqiu Troupe	Dan
Xu Junxia	2009	Female	Henan Troupe	Dan
Guo Yingli	2009	Female	Handan Dongfeng	Dan
Chu Shuzhen	2011	Female	Pingdingshan Troupe	Dan
Liu Wenhui	2013	Female	Jiyuan Troupe	Dan
Zhang Yanping	2015	Female	Zhengzhou Troupe	Dan
Zhang Peipei	2019	Female	Xinjiang Corps	Dan
Wu Suzhen	2019	Female	Henan Troupe	Dan

=== Yue opera ===
Name	Award year	Gender	Troupe	Role type
Mao Weitao	1985, 1994, 2007	Female	Zhejiang Xiaobaihua	Sheng
Wu Fenghua	1996, 2011	Female	Shaoxing Xiaobaihua	Sheng
Zhou Yunjuan	1993	Female	Zhejiang Troupe	Dan
Xie Qunying	1998	Female	Hangzhou Troupe	Dan
Tao Qi	1999	Female	Nanjing Troupe	Dan
Chen Huiling	1999	Female	Zhejiang Xiaobaihua	Dan
Dong Kedi	2000	Female	Zhejiang Xiaobaihua	Sheng
Qian Huili	2000	Female	Shanghai Troupe	Sheng
Shan Yangping	2000	Female	Shanghai Troupe	Dan
Meng Kejuan	2000	Female	Hangzhou Huanglong	Sheng
Zheng Manli	2001	Female	Wenzhou Troupe	Sheng
Shu Jinxia	2001	Female	Zhejiang Troupe	Dan
Zhang Ruihong	2002	Female	Shanghai Troupe	Sheng
Chen Xiaohong	2002	Female	Hangzhou Troupe	Dan
Zhao Haiying	2002	Female	Ningbo Xiaobaihua	Dan
Zhao Zhigang	2004	Male	Shanghai Troupe	Sheng
Huang Meiju	2004	Female	Shengzhou Troupe	Dan
Xiao Ya	2004	Female	Xiao Ya Studio	Sheng
Wang Hangjuan	2004	Female	Hangzhou Huanglong	Dan
Chen Fei	2005	Female	Shaoxing Xiaobaihua	Dan
Zhang Xiaojun	2005	Female	Ningbo Xiaobaihua	Sheng
Fang Yafen	2007	Female	Shanghai Troupe	Dan
Li Min	2007	Female	Fujian Fanghua	Dan
Wu Suying	2009	Female	Shaoxing Xiaobaihua	Dan
Chen Xueping	2009	Female	Hangzhou Troupe	Sheng
Xu Ming	2011	Female	Hangzhou Troupe	Sheng
Wang Zhiping	2011	Female	Shanghai Troupe	Dan
Hua Weiqiang	2011	Male	Zhejiang Troupe	Sheng
Wang Binmei	2013	Female	Zhejiang Troupe	Dan
Zheng Guofeng	2013	Female	Hangzhou Troupe	Sheng
Wang Jun'an	2015	Female	Fujian Fanghua	Sheng
Zhang Lin	2017	Female	Shaoxing Xiaobaihua	Sheng
Zhou Yujun	2017	Female	Hangzhou Troupe	Dan
Chen Liyu	2019	Female	Fujian Fanghua	Sheng
Cai Zhefei	2019	Female	Zhejiang Xiaobaihua	Sheng

=== Qinqiang ===
Name	Award year	Gender	Troupe	Role type
Li Dongqiao	1986, 2013	Male	Shaanxi Academy	Sheng
Li Mei	1996, 2011	Female	Shaanxi Academy	Dan
Liu Ping	2002, 2013	Female	Yinchuan Troupe	Dan
Dai Chunrong	1988	Female	Xi'an Yisushe	Dan
Dou Fengqin	1997	Female	Gansu Troupe	Dan
Hou Hongqin	2000	Female	Xi'an Youth	Dan
Sun Cundie	2001	Male	Shaanxi Academy	Chou
Tan Jianxun	2001	Male	Gansu Troupe	Sheng
Li Juan	2001	Female	Shaanxi Academy	Dan
Li Xiaofeng	2004	Male	Shaanxi Academy	Sheng
Qi Aiyun	2004	Female	Xi'an Wuyi	Dan
Ren Xiaolei	2007	Female	Shaanxi Academy	Dan
Wang Xincang	2007	Male	Shaanxi Academy	Sheng
Zhang Xiaoqin (张晓琴)	2007	Female	Qingtongxia Troupe	Sheng / Dan
Zhang Xiaoqin (张小琴)	2007	Female	Lanzhou Troupe	Dan
Zhang Bei	2009	Female	Shaanxi Academy	Dan
Li Xiaoxiong	2009	Male	Yinchuan Troupe	Sheng
Hui Minli	2009	Female	Xi'an Troupe	Dan
Qu Qiaozhe	2009	Female	Xining Troupe	Dan
Li Junmei	2011	Female	Shaanxi Academy	Dan
Hou Yan	2011	Female	Ningxia Troupe	Dan
Li Shufang	2011	Female	Xi'an Yisushe	Dan
Su Fengli	2013	Female	Gansu Troupe	Dan
Zhao Yangwu	2013	Male	Shaanxi Academy	Sheng
Qu Lianying	2013	Female	Ningxia Troupe	Sheng
Wei Xiaoli	2015	Female	Shaanxi Academy	Dan
Zhang Tao	2015	Male	Xi'an Troupe	Sheng
Wei Xiaobing	2017	Male	Ningxia Troupe	Jing
Yuan Yaya	2017	Female	Tianshui Academy	Dan
Li Xiaoqing	2019	Male	Shaanxi Academy	Sheng

=== Sichuan opera ===
Name	Award year	Gender	Troupe	Role type
Shen Tiemei	1989, 2000, 2011	Female	Chongqing Troupe	Dan
Liu Yun	1988, 1994	Female	Chengdu Academy	Dan
Chen Zhilin	1990, 2004	Male	Sichuan Troupe	Sheng
Tian Mansha	1992, 2003	Female	Sichuan School	Dan
Chen Qiaoru	1992, 2011	Female	Chengdu Academy	Dan
Xiao Ting	1984	Male	Chengdu Academy	Sheng
Gu Xiaoqin	1989	Female	Chengdu Academy	Dan
Ma Wenjin	1991	Female	Chongqing Troupe	Dan
Yu Haiyan	1994	Female	Mianyang Troupe	Dan
He Ling	1995	Female	Sichuan Troupe	Dan
Xiao Demei	1996	Male	Sichuan School	Sheng
Jiang Shumei	1998	Female	Mianyang Troupe	Dan
Liu Ping	2001	Female	Chengdu Academy	Dan
Li Sha	2002	Female	Sichuan Troupe	Dan
Sun Yongbo	2003	Male	Chengdu Academy	Sheng
Cui Guangli	2003	Female	Sichuan Troupe	Dan
Sun Puxie	2005	Male	Chengdu Academy	Jing
Huang Ronghua	2005	Female	Chongqing Troupe	Dan
Liu Yi	2007	Female	Sichuan Troupe	Dan
Wang Yumei	2011	Female	Chengdu Academy	Dan
Tan Jiqiong	2011	Female	Sanxia Troupe	Dan
Hu Yubin	2011	Male	Nanchong Troupe	Chou / Sheng
Wang Chao	2013	Male	Chengdu Academy	Sheng
Wu Xi	2015	Female	Chongqing Troupe	Dan
Yu Jia	2019	Female	Chengdu Academy	Dan

=== Ping opera ===
Name	Award year	Gender	Troupe	Role type
Feng Yuping	1988, 2000, 2013	Female	Shenyang Troupe	Dan
Liu Xiurong	1988, 2002	Female	Shijiazhuang Youth	Dan
Cui Lianrun	1992, 2001	Female	Tianjin Troupe	Dan
Zeng Zhaojuan	1999, 2009	Female	Tianjin Troupe	Dan
Gu Wenyue	1984	Female	China Troupe	Dan
Wang Manling	1984	Female	Changchun Troupe	Dan
Liu Ping	1985	Female	China Troupe	Dan
Ma Shuhua	1990	Female	Tianjin Troupe	Dan
Li Xiuyun	1990	Female	Tianjin Troupe	Dan
Li Weiquan	1992	Male	China Troupe	Jing / Sheng
Song Li	1992	Female	Shenyang Troupe	Dan
Ma Huimin	1993	Male	Heilongjiang Troupe	Sheng
Yuan Shumei	1997	Female	Shijiazhuang Troupe	Dan
Wang Xiangyang	2000	Female	Heilongjiang Troupe	Dan
Han Jianguang	2002	Male	China Troupe	Sheng
Liu Huixin	2003	Female	China Troupe	Dan
Xu Jinxian	2003	Female	Shijiazhuang Troupe	Dan
Zhao Lihua	2004	Male	Shijiazhuang Youth	Sheng
Zhao Bin	2005	Male	Tianjin Troupe	Sheng
Zhang Junling	2007	Female	Tangshan Troupe	Sheng
Luo Huiqin	2007	Female	Tangshan Troupe	Dan
Jia Shuceng	2007	Female	Changchun Shuangyang	Dan
Zhou Dan	2011	Female	Shenyang Troupe	Dan

=== Cantonese opera ===
Name	Award year	Gender	Troupe	Role type
Feng Gangyi	1989, 2002	Male	Shenzhen Troupe	Sheng
Ou Kaiming	1995, 2015	Male	Guangzhou Hongdou	Sheng
Ding Fan	1991	Male	Guangdong Troupe	Sheng
Chen Yunhong	1995	Female	Guangdong Troupe	Dan
Ni Huiying	1997	Female	Guangzhou Troupe	Dan
Liang Yao'an	1998	Male	Guangzhou Troupe	Sheng
Cao Xiuqin	1998	Female	Guangdong Troupe	Dan
Zhuo Peili	1998	Female	Shenzhen Troupe	Dan
Yao Zhiqiang	1999	Male	Zhuhai Troupe	Sheng
Wu Guohua	2000	Male	Guangdong Troupe	Sheng
Liang Shuqing	2001	Female	Guangzhou Troupe	Dan
Zeng Hui	2002	Female	Zhaoqing Troupe	Dan
Liang Sumei	2002	Female	Nanning Troupe	Dan
Lai Qiongxia	2003	Female	Zhuhai Troupe	Dan
Li Shuqin	2004	Female	Foshan Troupe	Dan
Jiang Wenduan	2011	Female	Guangdong Troupe	Dan
Li Junsheng	2011	Male	Guangzhou Troupe	Sheng
Cui Yumei	2013	Female	Guangzhou Troupe	Dan
Wu Feifan	2015	Female	Guangzhou Troupe	Dan
Mai Yuqing	2015	Female	Guangdong Troupe	Dan
Su Chunmei	2017	Female	Guangzhou Troupe	Dan
Zeng Xiaomin	2017	Female	Guangdong Troupe	Dan

=== Hebei bangzi ===
Name	Award year	Gender	Troupe	Role type
Pei Yanling	1986, 1996, 2009	Female	Hebei Troupe	Sheng
Liu Yuling	1984, 2003	Female	Beijing Youth	Dan
Xu Heying	1998, 2015	Female	Hebei Troupe	Dan
Zhang Huiyun	1986	Female	Hebei Troupe	Dan
Wang Fengzhi	1987	Female	Beijing Troupe	Dan
Li Er'e	1987	Female	Beijing Troupe	Dan
Lei Baochun	1989	Male	Shijiazhuang Troupe	Sheng
Peng Huiheng	1996	Female	Hebei Troupe	Dan
Peng Yanqin	2001	Female	Beijing Troupe	Dan
Liu Lisha	2002	Female	Shijiazhuang Troupe	Dan
Wang Hongling	2003	Female	Hebei Troupe	Dan
Chen Chun	2003	Female	Tianjin Troupe	Sheng
Li Yumei	2005	Female	Baoding Academy	Dan
Yang Liping	2007	Female	Tianjin Troupe	Dan
Wang Yinghui	2009	Male	Beijing Troupe	Sheng
Zhao Jing	2009	Female	Tianjin Troupe	Dan
Liu Fengling	2009	Male	Hebei Troupe	Sheng
Wu Guiyun	2011	Female	Hebei Troupe	Sheng
Qiu Ruide	2015	Male	Hebei Troupe	Sheng
Wang Shaohua	2017	Male	Hebei Troupe	Sheng

=== Shanxi opera ===
Name	Award year	Gender	Troupe	Role type
Shi Jiahua	1995, 2011	Female	Jinzhong Youth	Dan
Xie Tao	1997, 2009	Female	Taiyuan Experimental	Sheng
Tian Guilan	1987	Female	Shanxi Troupe	Dan
Gao Cuiying	1988	Female	Taiyuan Troupe	Dan
Wang Wanmei	1989	Female	Jinzhong Troupe	Dan
Guo Caiping	1989	Female	Taiyuan Experimental	Sheng
Li Guilian	1991	Female	Shanxi Troupe	Dan
Song Zhuanzhuan	1991	Female	Hohhot Troupe	Dan
Du Yumei	1992	Female	Datong Troupe	Dan
Cui Jianhua	1995	Female	Jinzhong Youth	Dan
Li Ping	1999	Female	Zhangjiakou Youth	Dan
Yang Hongli	2000	Female	Jinzhong Xiaomingqin	Sheng
Wu Lingyun	2000	Male	Taiyuan Liyuan	Sheng
Hu Chang'e	2001	Female	Taiyuan Experimental	Dan
Wang Zhenru	2003	Female	Jinzhong Youth	Sheng / Dan
Miao Jie	2007	Female	Shanxi Troupe	Dan
Liang Guixing	2007	Female	Lüliang Youth	Dan
He Xiaoju	2007	Female	Hohhot Troupe	Dan
Qu Jianhong	2011	Female	Hohhot Troupe	Sheng

=== Huangmei opera ===
Name	Award year	Gender	Troupe	Role type
Han Zaifen	2000, 2015	Female	Anqing Troupe	Dan
Ma Lan	1987	Female	Anhui Troupe	Dan
Huang Xinde	1992	Male	Anhui Troupe	Sheng
Yang Jun	1996	Female	Hubei Troupe	Dan
Wu Yaling	2002	Female	Anhui Troupe	Dan
Zhao Yuanyuan	2004	Female	Anqing Troupe	Dan
Li Wen	2004	Female	Anhui Troupe	Dan
Jiang Jianguo	2007	Male	Anhui Troupe	Sheng
Zhou Yuanyuan	2009	Female	Anhui Troupe	Dan
Zhang Hui	2009	Male	Hubei Troupe	Sheng
Wang Qin	2013	Female	Anqing Troupe	Dan
Sun Juan	2013	Female	Anhui Troupe	Dan
He Yun	2015	Female	Anhui Troupe	Dan
Cheng Cheng	2017	Female	Hubei Troupe	Dan

=== Pu opera ===
Name	Award year	Gender	Troupe	Role type
Ren Genxin	1984, 2001	Female	Linfen Troupe	Dan
Jing Xuebian	1995, 2013	Female	Yuncheng Troupe	Dan
Guo Zemin	1984	Male	Linfen Troupe	Sheng
Wu Junying	1988	Female	Yuncheng Troupe	Dan
Wang Yihua	1994	Male	Yuncheng Troupe	Sheng
Cui Caicai	1996	Female	Linfen Troupe	Dan
Ji Youfang	2004	Female	Yuncheng Troupe	Dan
Kong Xiangdong	2009	Male	Yanhu Troupe	Sheng
Jia Julan	2013	Female	Yuncheng Troupe	Dan

=== Other genres ===
- Flower-drum opera: Liu Zhaoqian (1992), Hu Xinzhong (1997), Li Chunhua (1998), Cai Jianting (2000), Zeng Ju (2007), Ye Hong (2017)
- Wuxi opera: Ni Tongfang (1993), Xiao Wang Binbin (1996), Zhou Dongliang (2002), Chen Yunxia (2002), Huang Jinghui (2009), Dong Hong (2013)
- Chu opera: Yu Shengle (1986), Liu Danli (1997), Peng Qinglian (2003), Xia Qingling (2011), Zhan Chunyao (2013)
- Han opera: Deng Min (1989), Hu Heyan (1991), Qiu Ling (1992), Peng Ling (2005), Wang Li (2015)
- Xiang opera: Zuo Dabin (1989), Wang Yongguang (1991), He Xiaohan (1993), Cao Rulong (1996), Wang Yangjuan (2000)
- Shangdang bangzi: Wu Guohua (1992), Zhang Aizhen (1992), Zhang Baoping (1999), Chen Suqin (2002), Du Jianping (2015)
- Min opera: Chen Naichun (1993), Chen Hongxiang (2005), Zhou Hong (2007), Chen Qiong (2011), Wu Zewen (2017)
- Huai opera: Liang Weiping (1994), Liang Guoying (1996), Wang Shulong (2003), Chen Cheng (2004), Chen Mingkuang (2015)
- Shanghai opera: Mao Shanyu (1985, 2013), Hua Wen (1987, 2015), Chen Yu (1992), Ma Lili (1994)
- Dian opera: Wang Yuzhen (1992), Zhou Weihua (1999), Feng Yongmei (2000), Chen Yaping (2013)
- Yan opera: Yang Zhongyi (1993), Cheng Fengying (1997), Jia Fentao (1998), Zhang Caiping (2003)
- Tea-picking opera: Zhang Manjun (1994), Long Hong (1994), Zhao Yiqing (1997), Yang Jun (2015)
- Hui opera: Li Longbin (1994), Dong Cheng (1998), Wang Danhong (2011), Wang Yushu (2017)
- Qu opera: Xu Di (1997), Zhang Shaorong (2000), Yang Shuaixue (2003), Fang Suzhen (2005)
- Long opera: Lei Tongxia (1999), Bian Xiao (2004), Tong Hongmei (2013), Dou Fengxia (2015)
- Lü opera: Gao Jing (2000), Liu Yufeng (2001), Jiao Li (2007), Lü Shu'e (2013)
- Wu opera: Chen Meilan (1989, 2007), Zhang Jianmin (1997), Yang Xiayun (2015)
- Meihu opera: Xu Aiying (1990), Yan Huifang (2007), Pan Guoliang (2009)
- Lantern opera: Yang Liqiong (1998), Li Danyu (2003), Shao Zhiqing (2007)
- Shao opera: Zhao Xiuzhi (1999), Yao Baiqing (2013), Shi Jiejing (2015)
- Teochew opera: Chen Xuexi (2001), Zhang Yihuang (2007), Lin Yanyun (2019)
- Yangzhou opera: Xu Xiufang (2002), Li Zhengcheng (2004), Gong Lili (2017)
- Qiong opera: Chen Suzhen (2007), Fu Chuanjie (2015), Lin Chuanmei (2019)
- Huajixi: Gu Xiang (1992, 1998, 2011), Zhang Keqin (1989)
- Wuyin opera: Huo Junping (1988, 2002), Lü Fengqin (2009)
- Longjiang opera: Bai Shuxian (1991, 1995), Li Xuefei (2011)
- Hakka opera: Li Xianhua (1994, 2001), Yang Xiuwei (1999)
- Gan opera: Tu Linghui (1987), Chen Li (1991)
- Gui opera: Su Guozhang (1991), Zhang Shuping (2002)
- Jiangsu bangzi: Zhang Hong (1992), Yan Ling (2001)
- Gaojia opera: Wu Jingjing (2004), Chen Juanjuan (2011)
- Liuqin opera: Wang Xiaohong (2005), Liu Lili (2015)
- Huaihai opera: Wei Jianing (2007), Xu Yaling (2011)
- Liyuan opera: Zeng Jingping (1989, 2007)
- Huanglong opera: Ma Zhongqin (1991)
- Xincheng opera: Liu Haibo (1993)
- Manhan opera: Zhang Fenglian (1993)
- Shangdang laozi: Guo Ming'e (1996)
- Wanwanqiang: Zhang Jianqin (1999)
- Puxian opera: Wang Shaoyuan (2000)
- Errentai: Wu Liping (2002)
- Lei opera: Lin Fen (2002)
- Bai opera: Yang Yikun (2002)
- Yong opera: Wang Jinwen (2003)
- Yuediao: Shen Xiaomei (2004)
- Liuzi opera: Chen Yuan (2005)
- Taiwanese opera: Su Yanrong (2009)
- Beilu bangzi: Zhan Lihua (2011)
- Qi opera: Xiao Xiaobo (2011)
- Pingdiao opera: Wang Hong (2013)
- Ou opera: Fang Rujiang (2013)
- Lhamo: Palden Wangchuk (2013)
- Zhuang opera: Ha Dan (2019)

== Gallery ==
Plum Blossom Award winners on stage
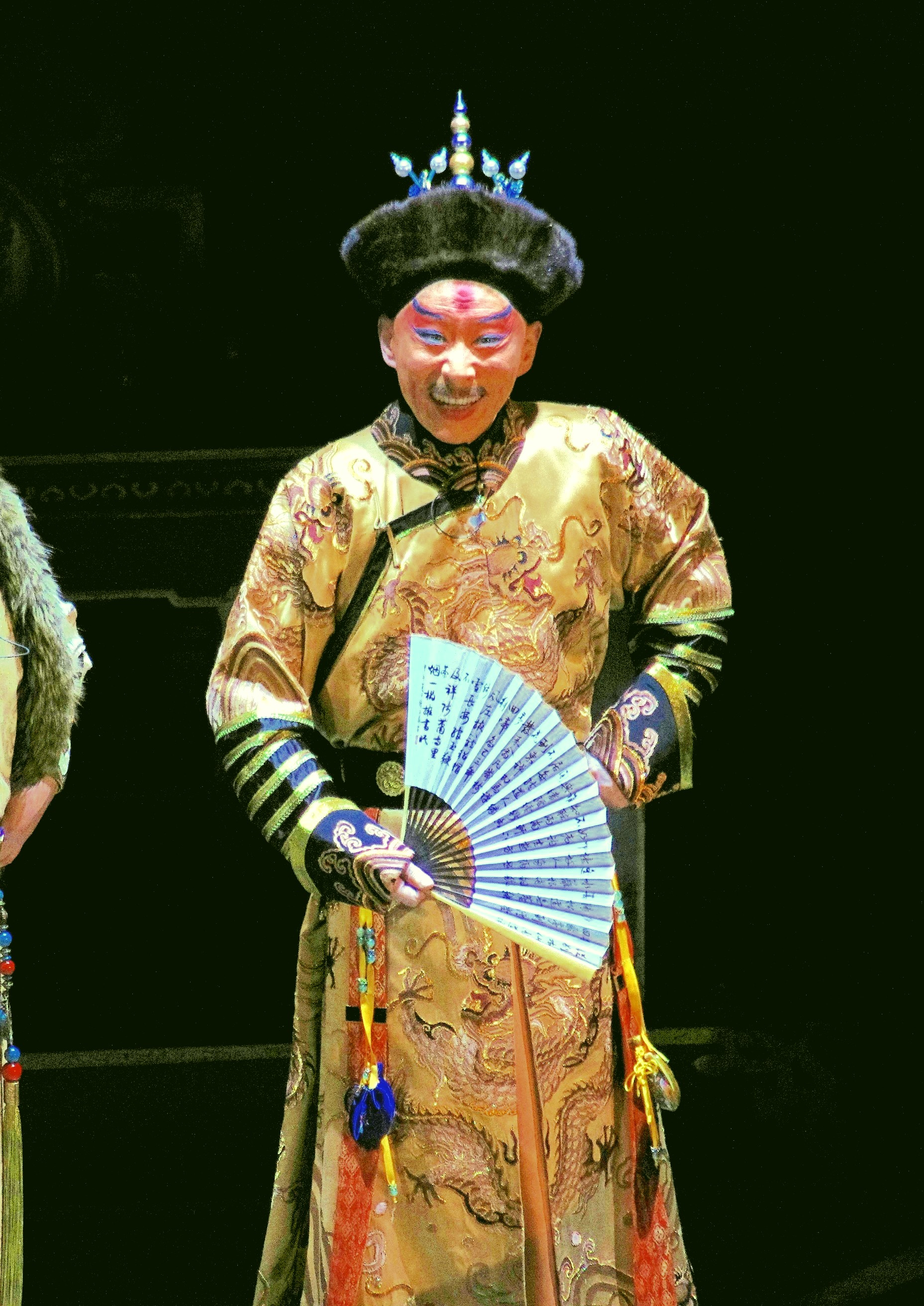
Wang Ping (Peking opera, two-time winner)

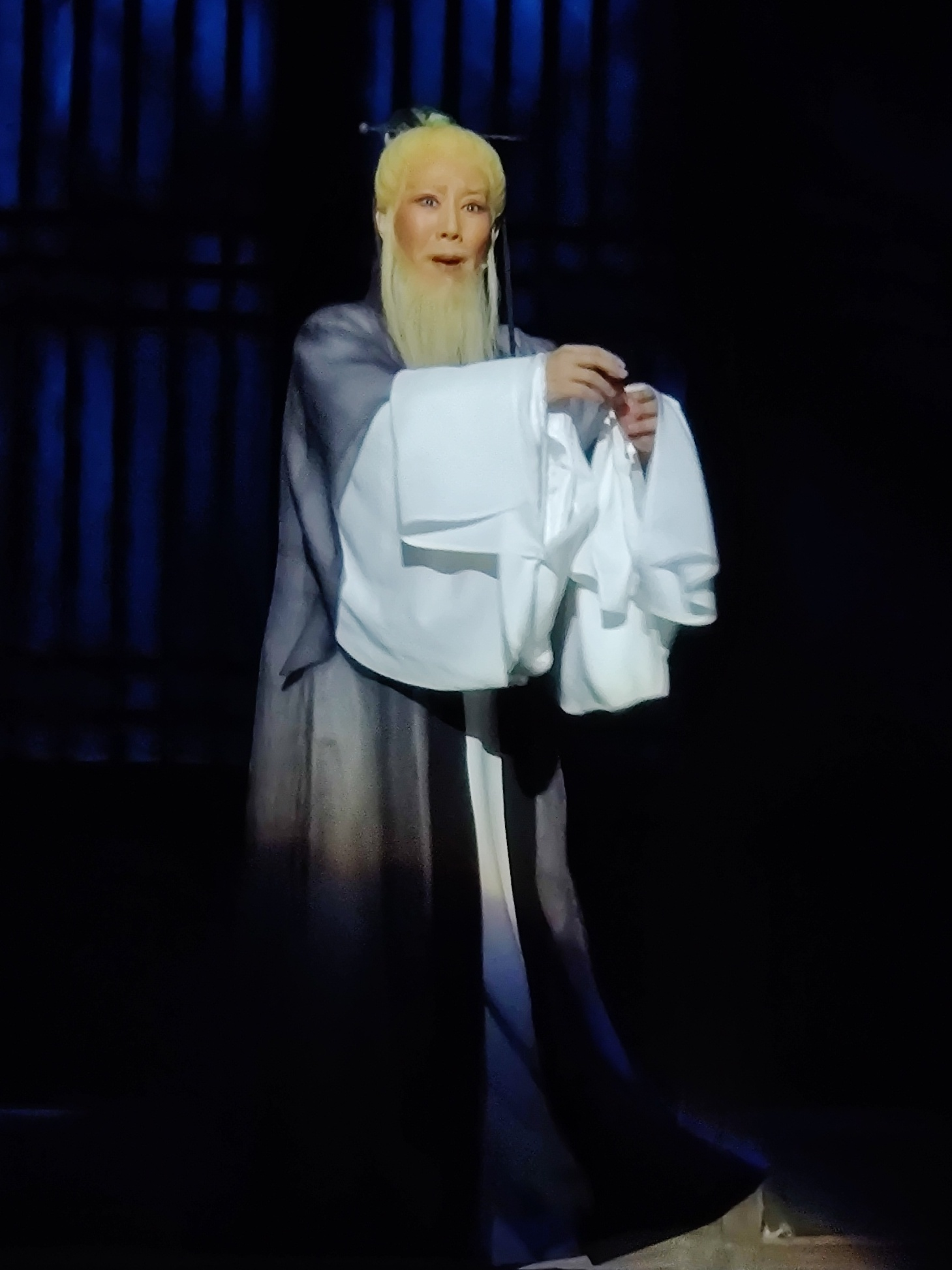
Xie Tao (Shanxi opera, two-time winner, male impersonator)

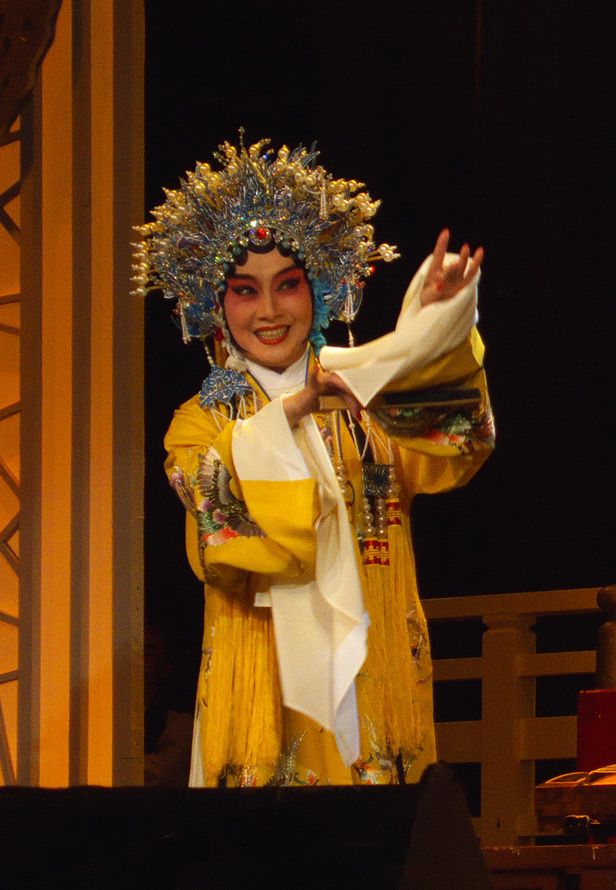
Zhang Jingxian (Kunqu, two-time winner)

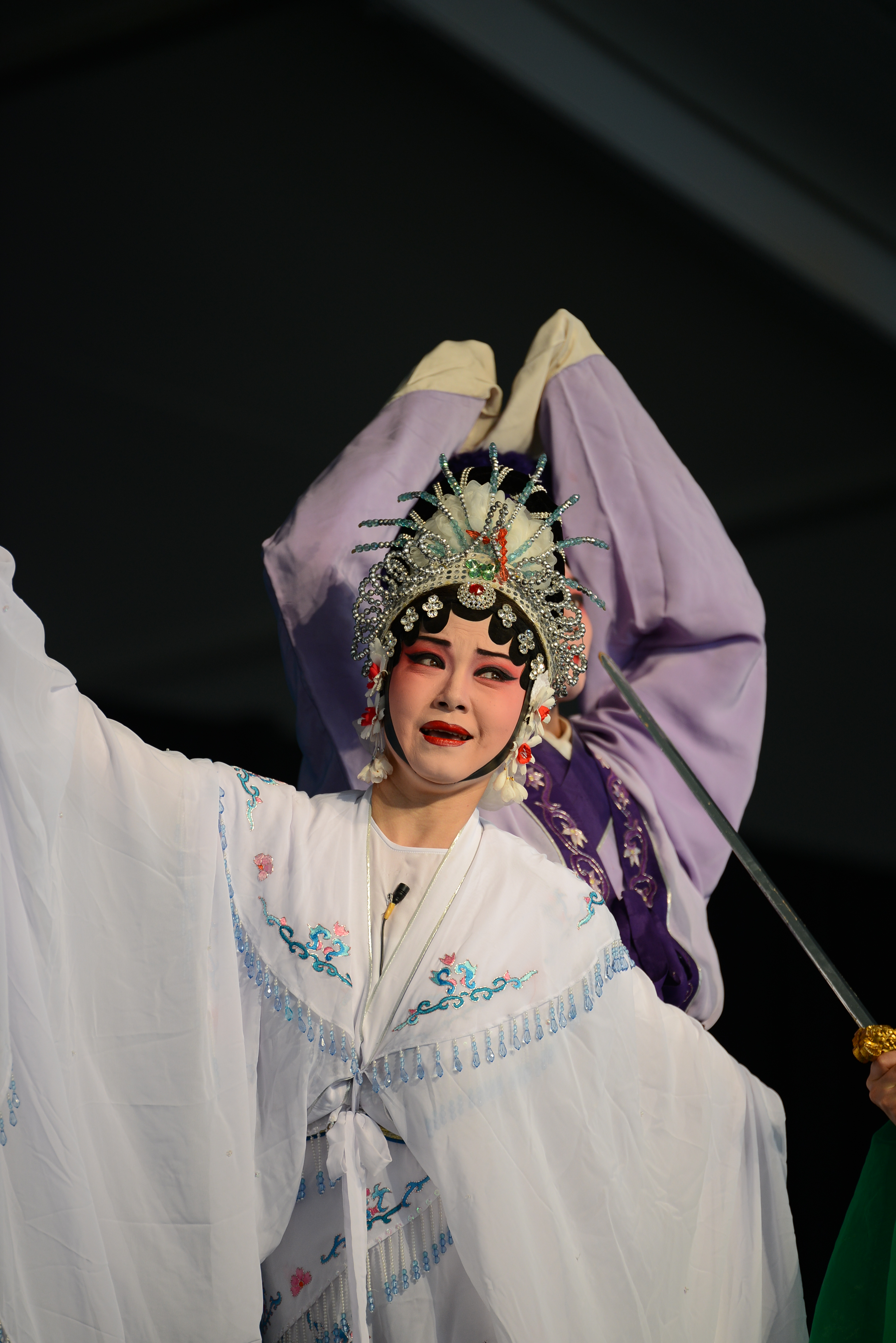
Chen Meilan (Wu opera, two-time winner)

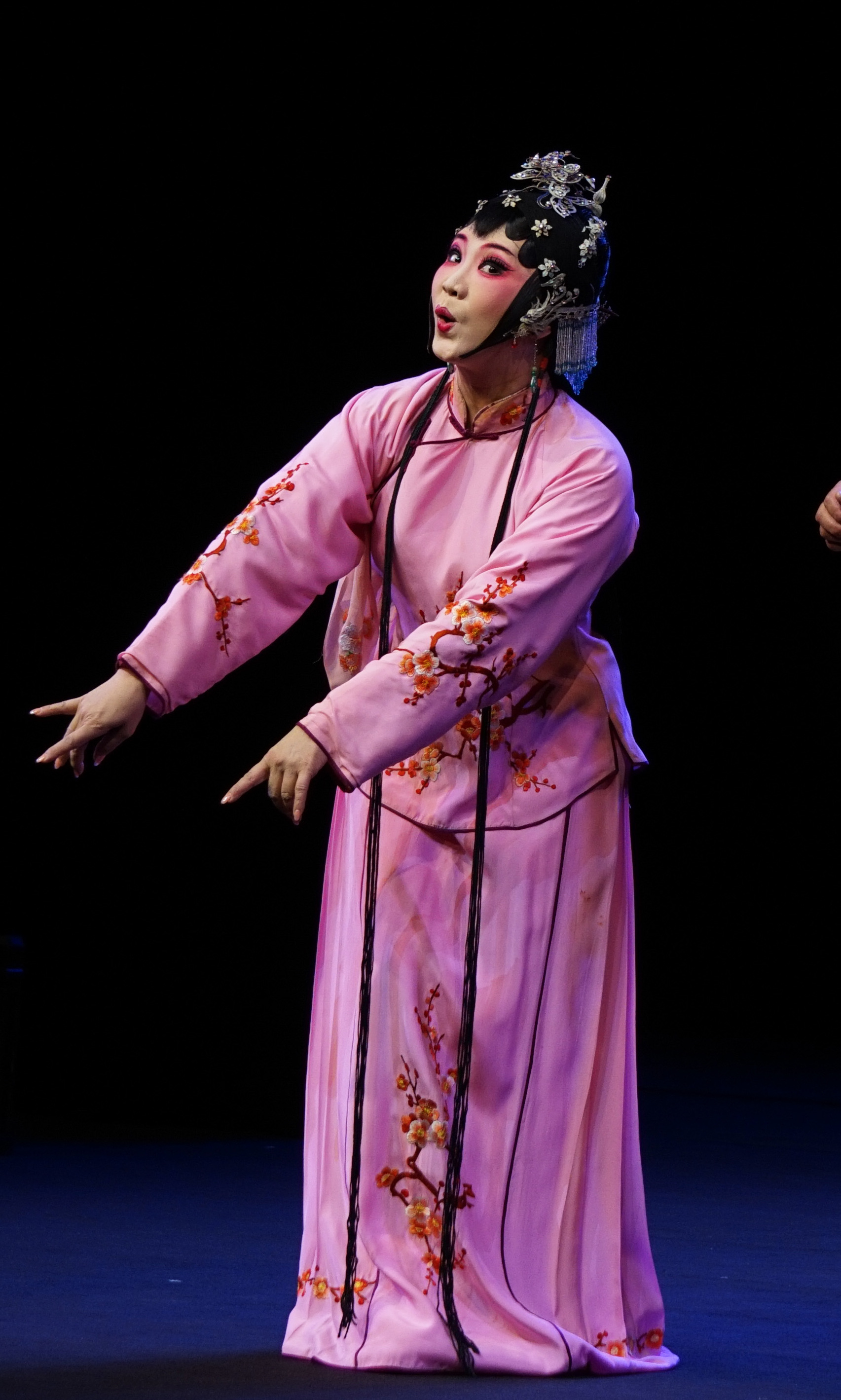
Zeng Jingping (Liyuan opera, two-time winner)

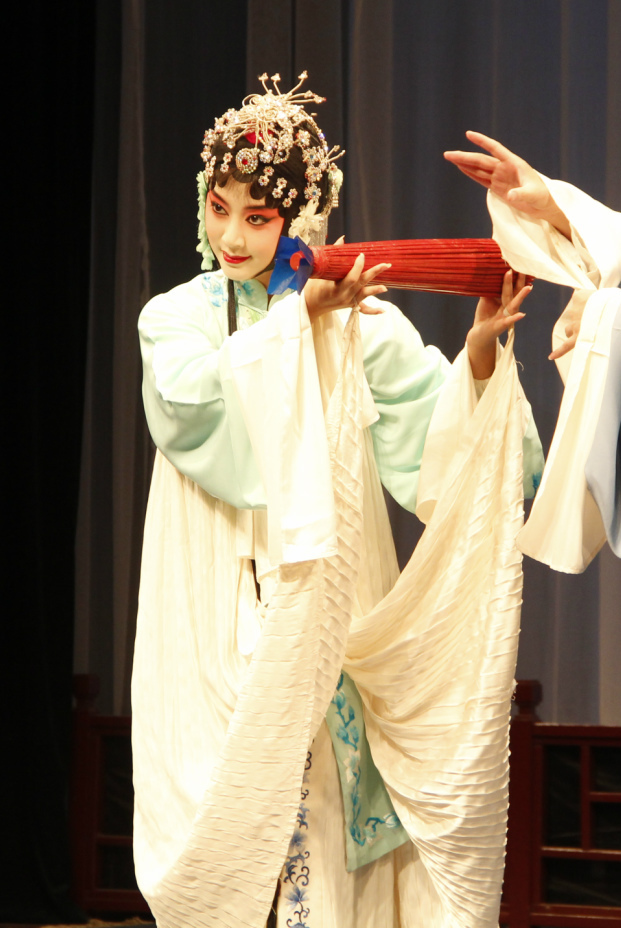
Shan Wen (Kunqu)

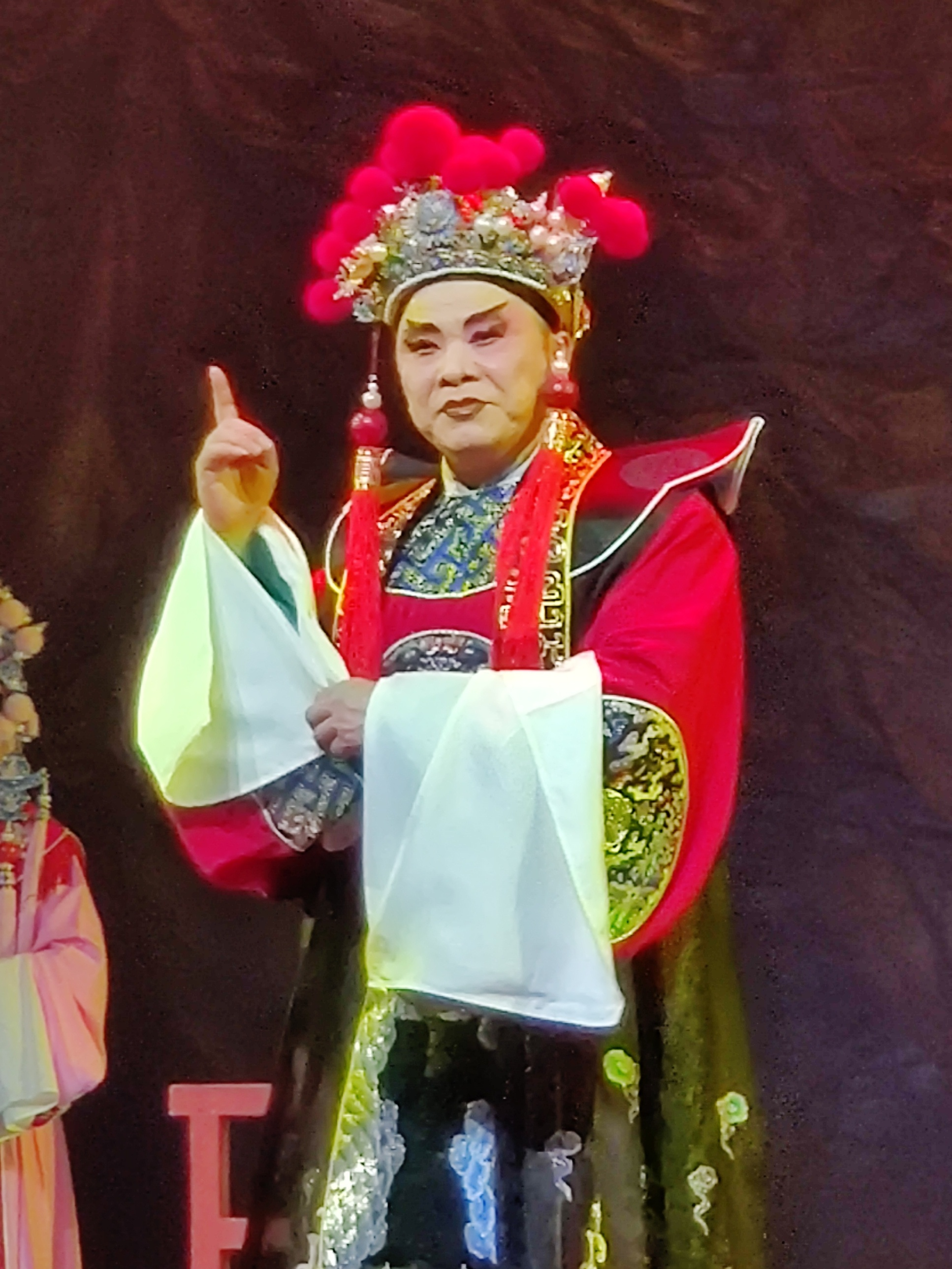
Yao Baiqing (Shao opera)

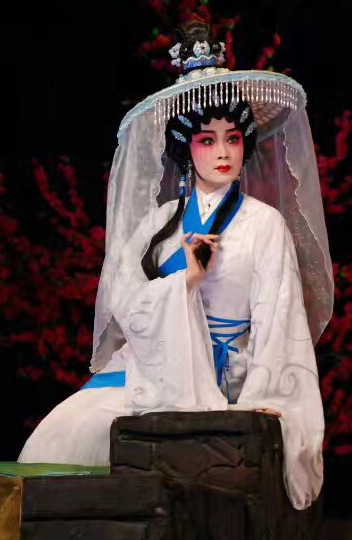
Jiang Wenduan (Cantonese opera)

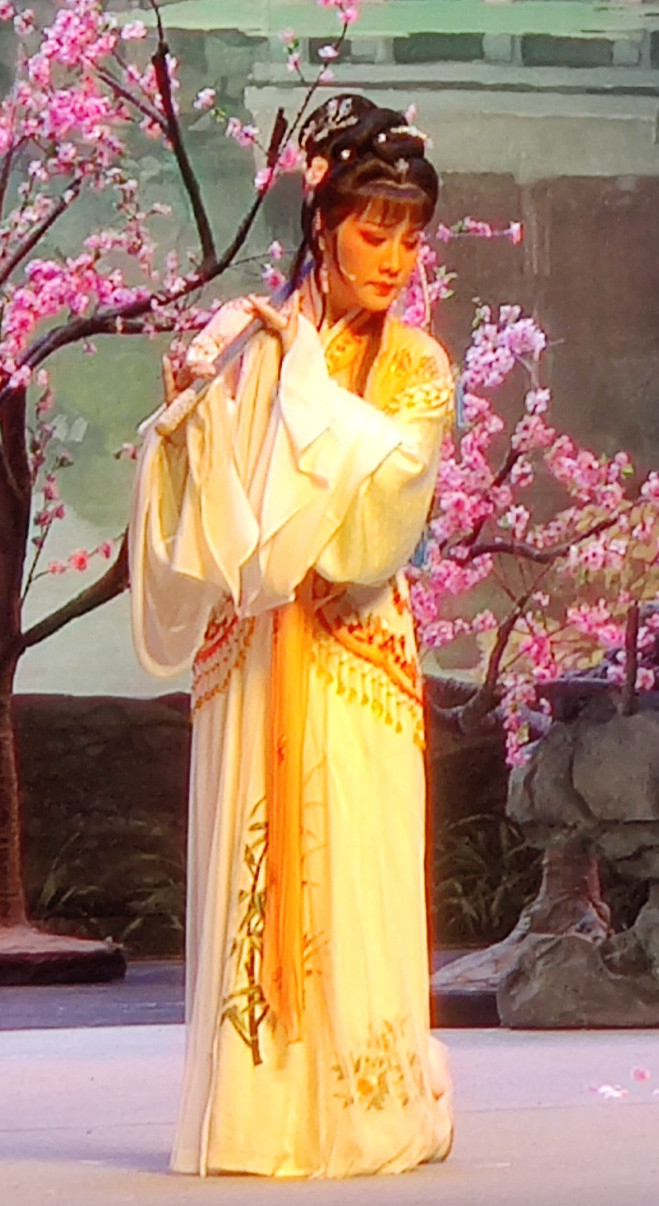
Fang Yafen (Yue opera)

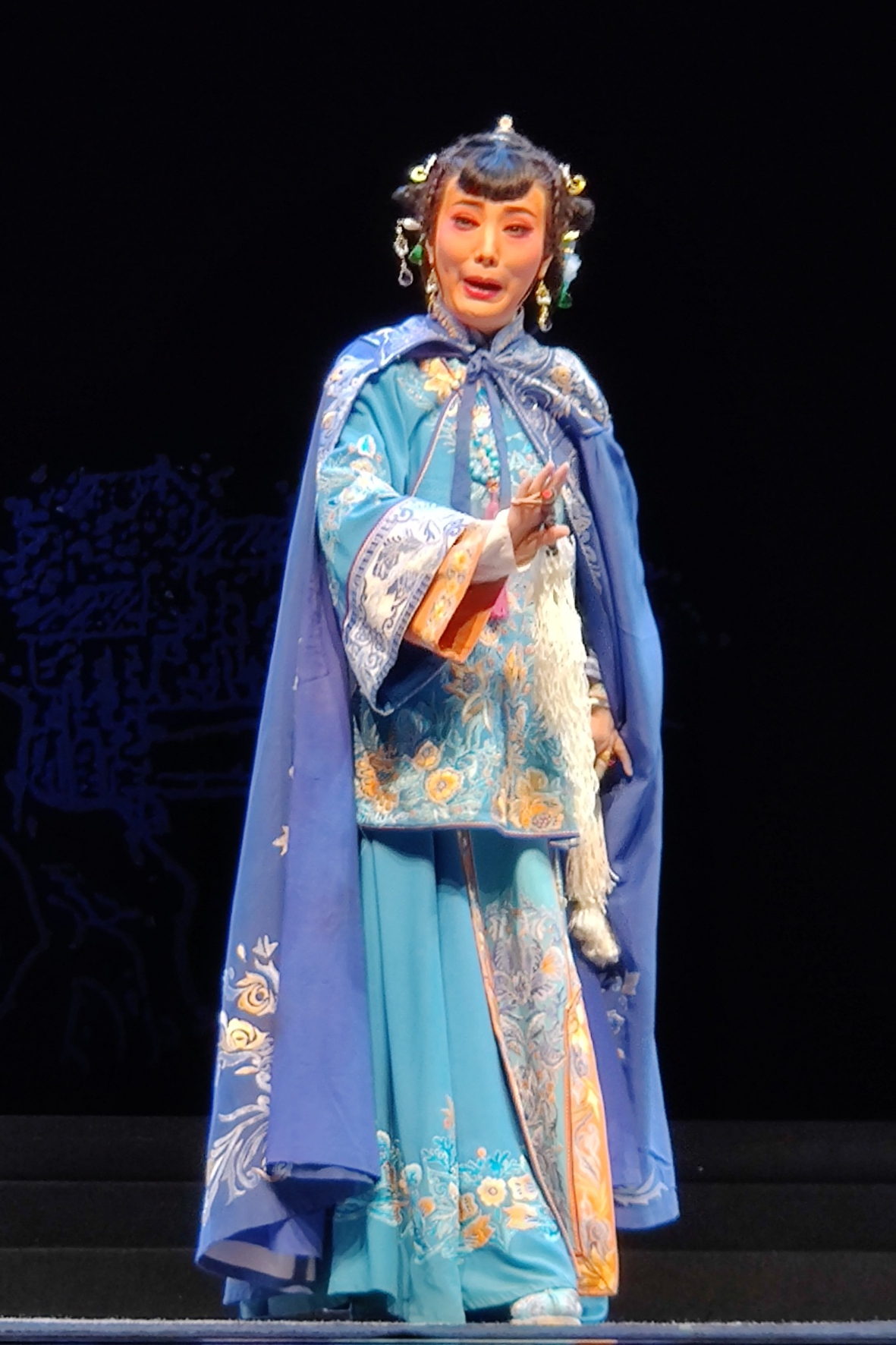
Qi Aiyun (Qinqiang)

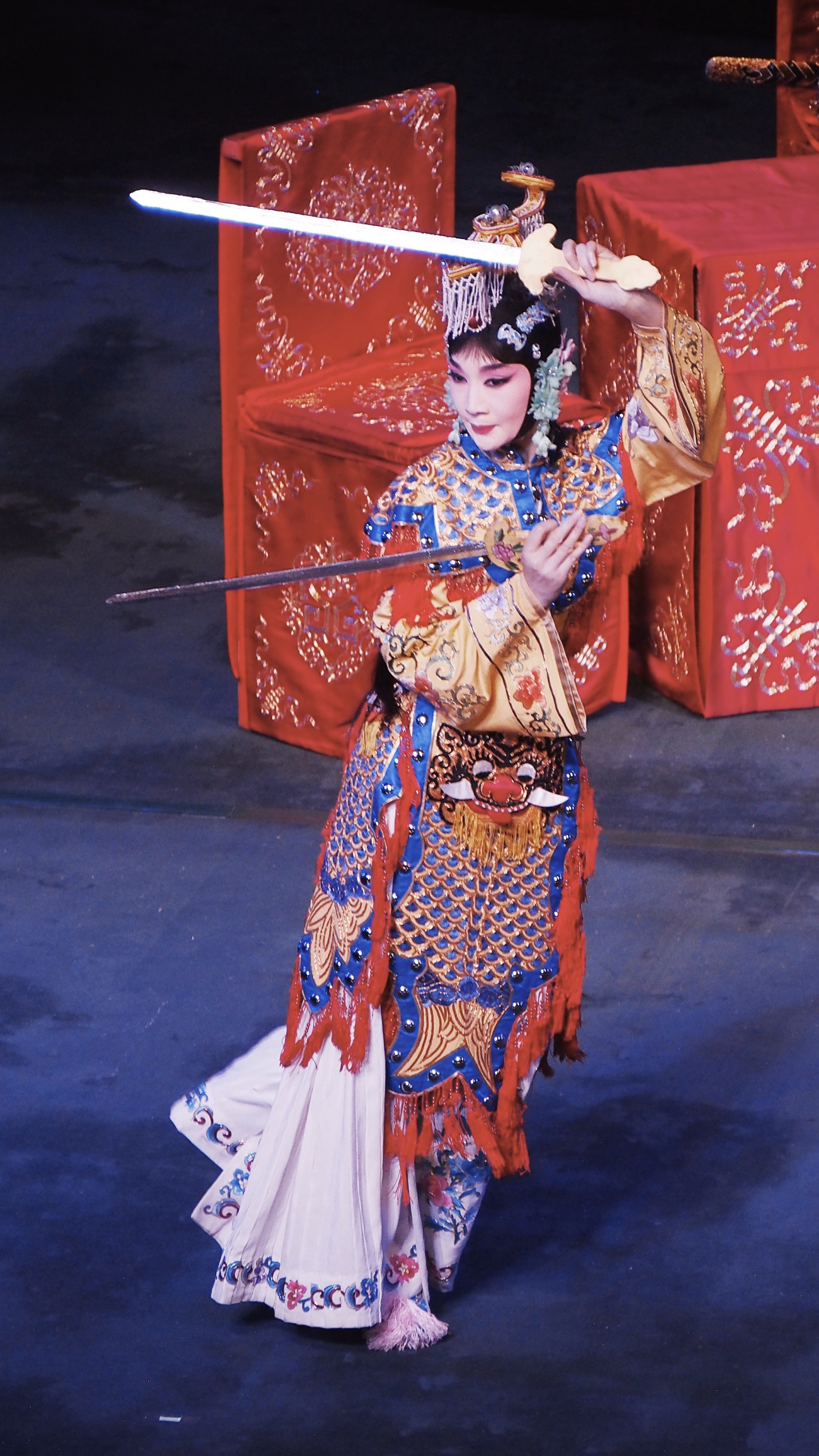
Li Yijie (a.k.a. Li Jie, Peking opera)

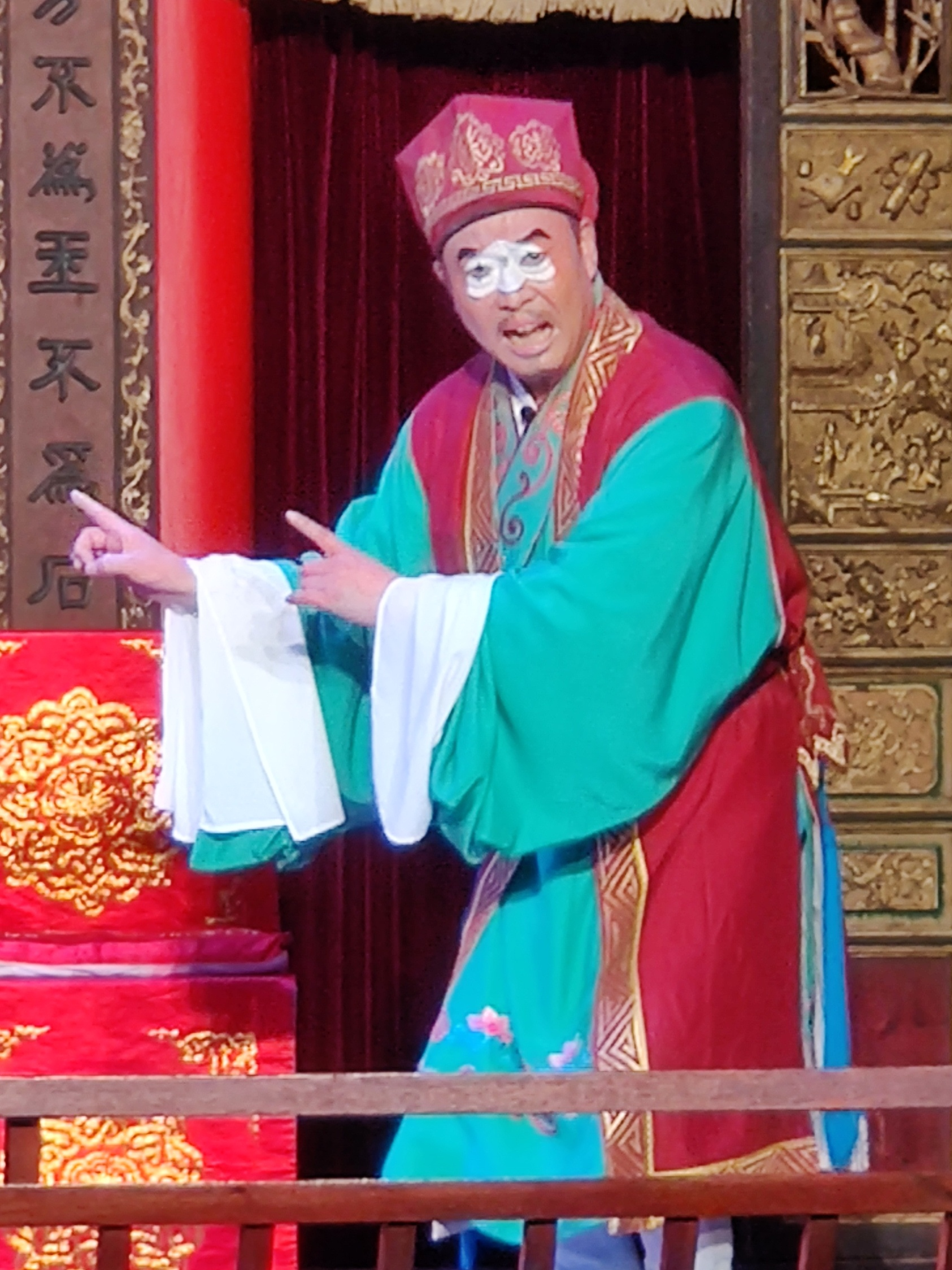
Wei Jianing (Huaihai opera)

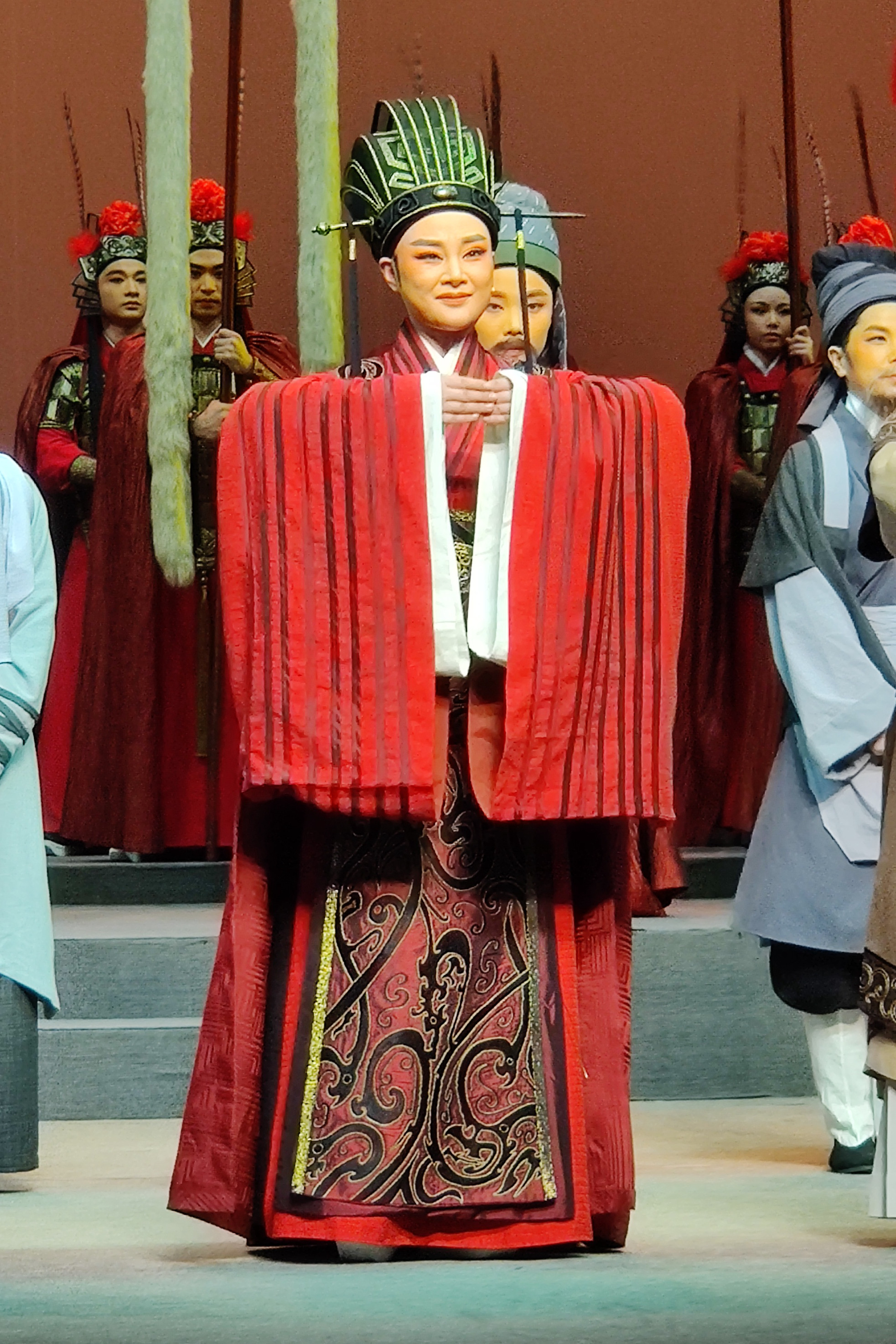
Zhang Lin (Yue opera, male impersonator)

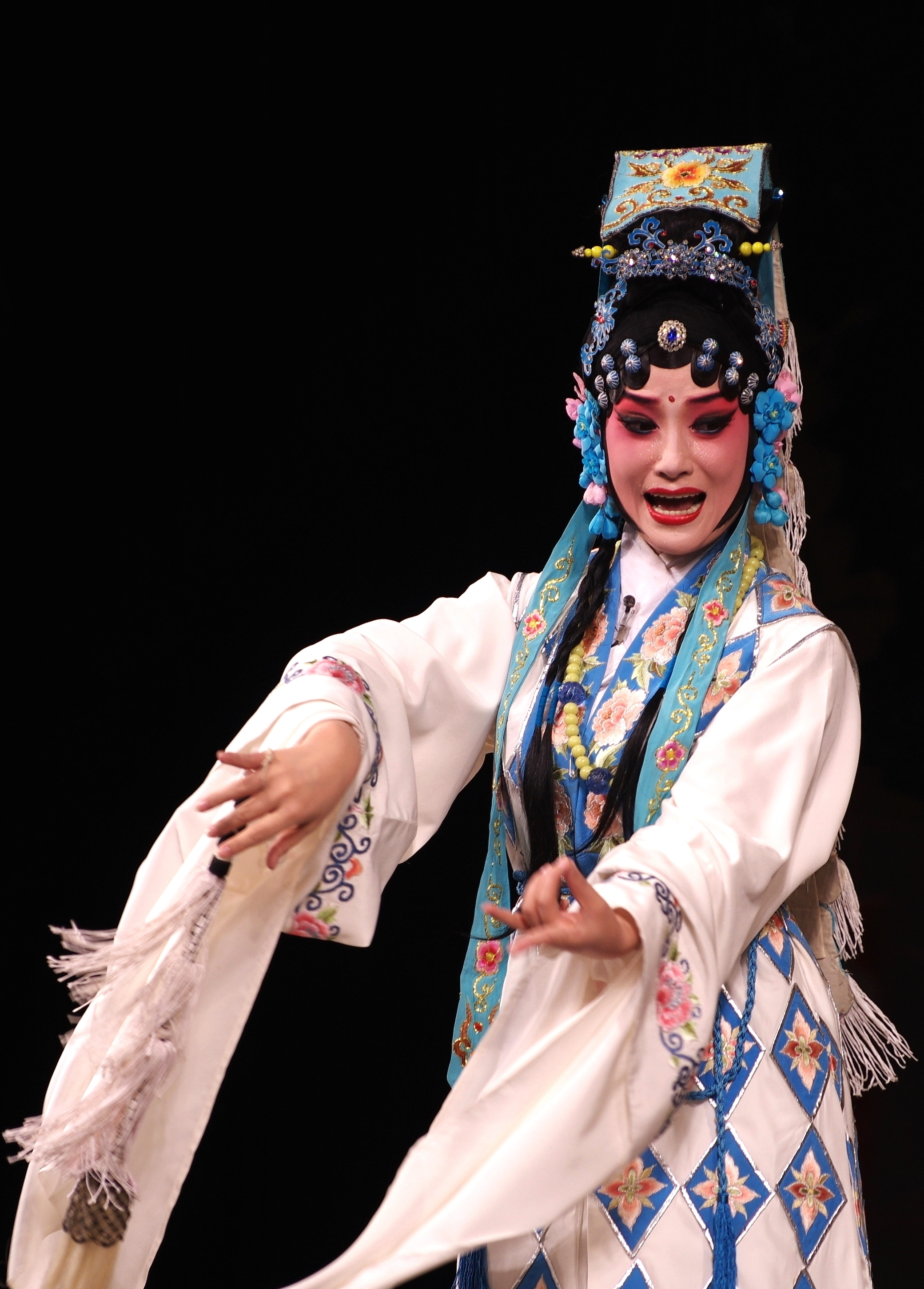
Wang Yumei (Sichuan opera)

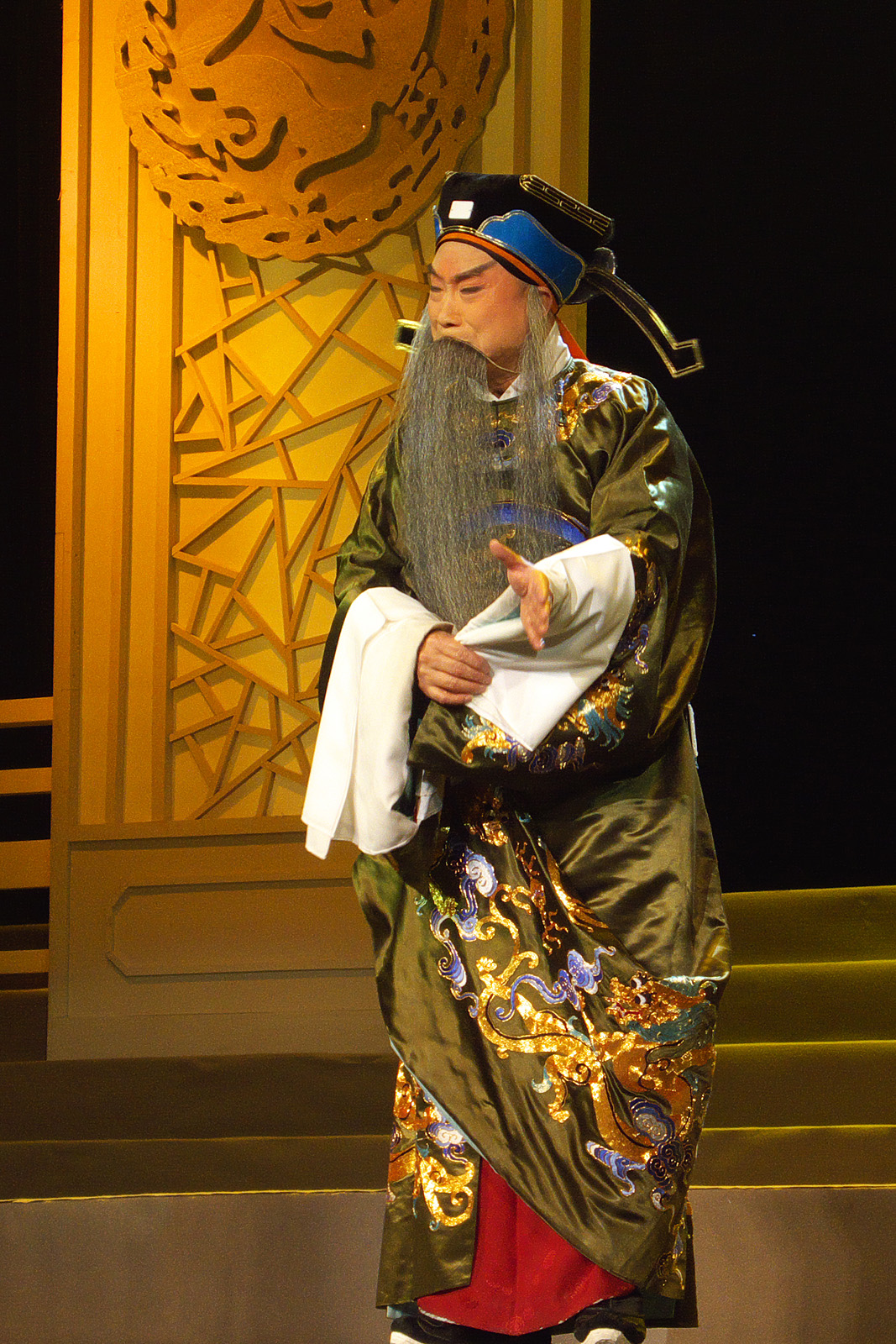
Chen Shaoyun (Peking opera)

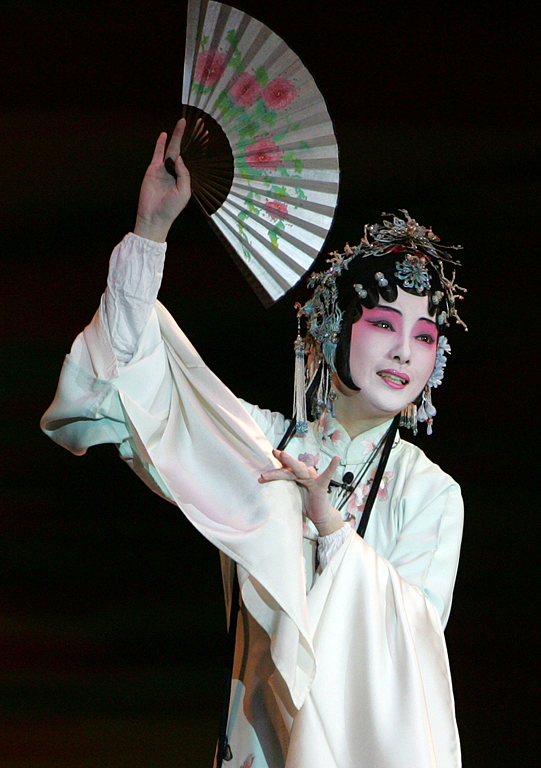
Shen Fengying (Kunqu)

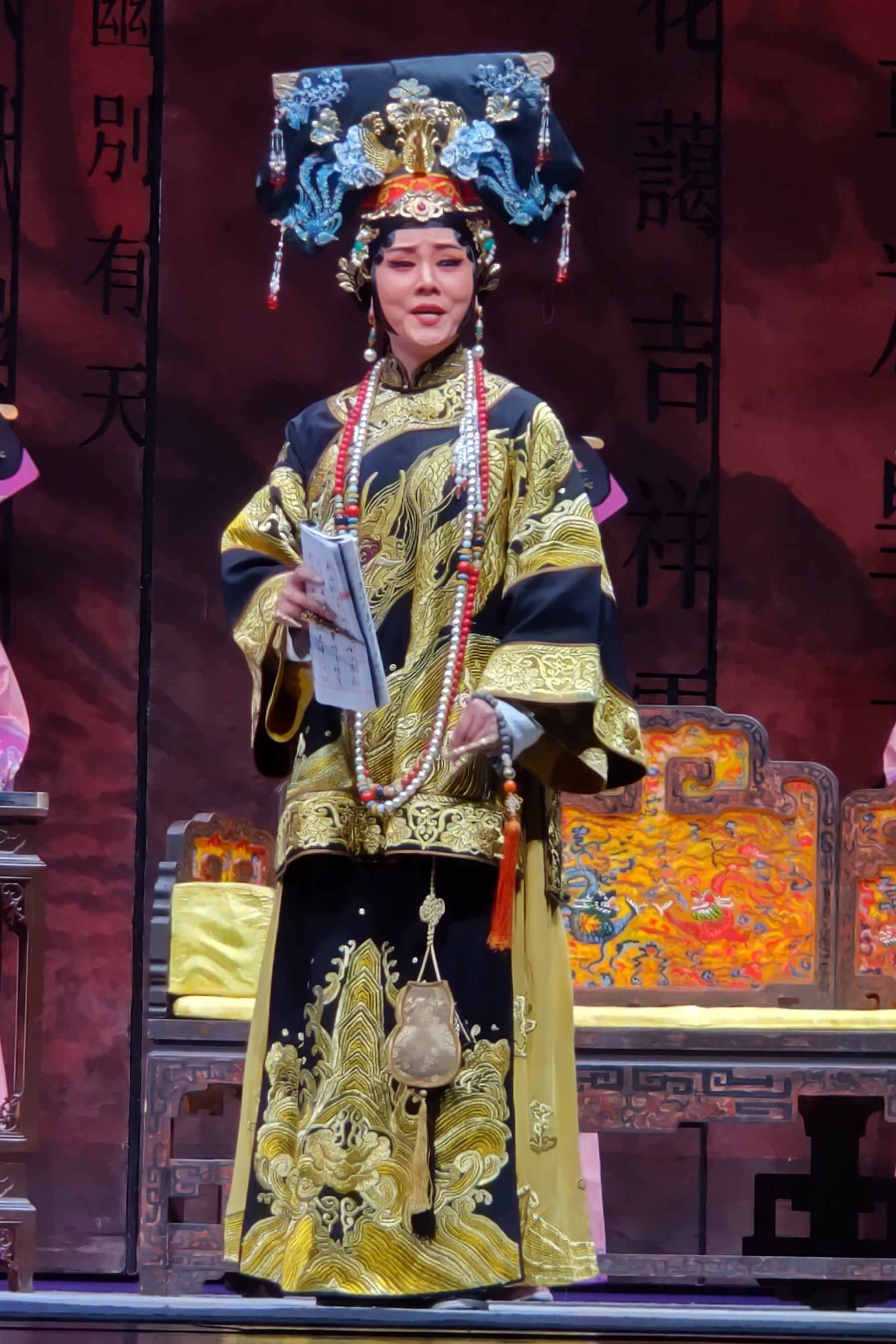
Hou Hongqin (Qinqiang)

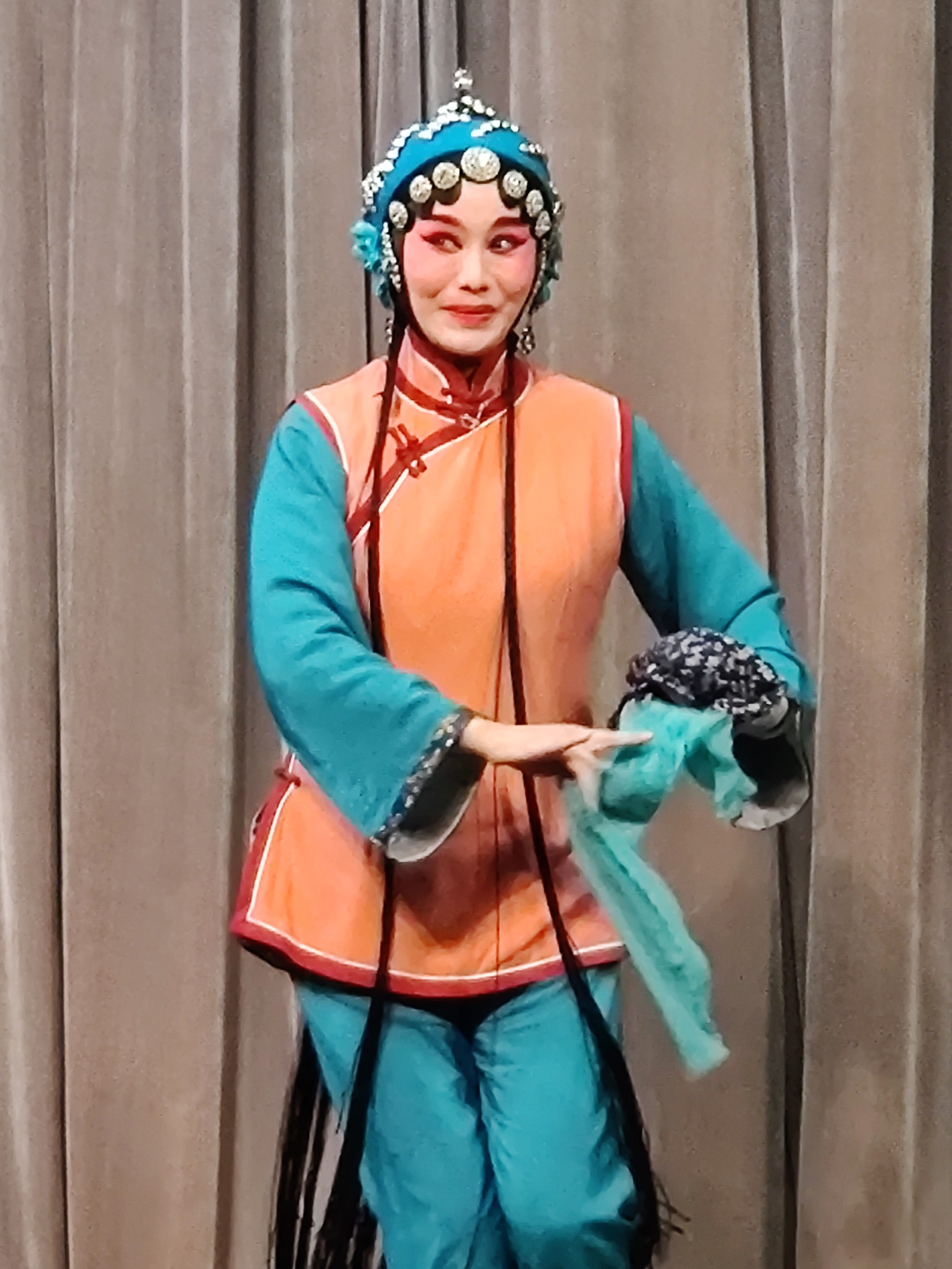
Xia Qingling (Chu opera)

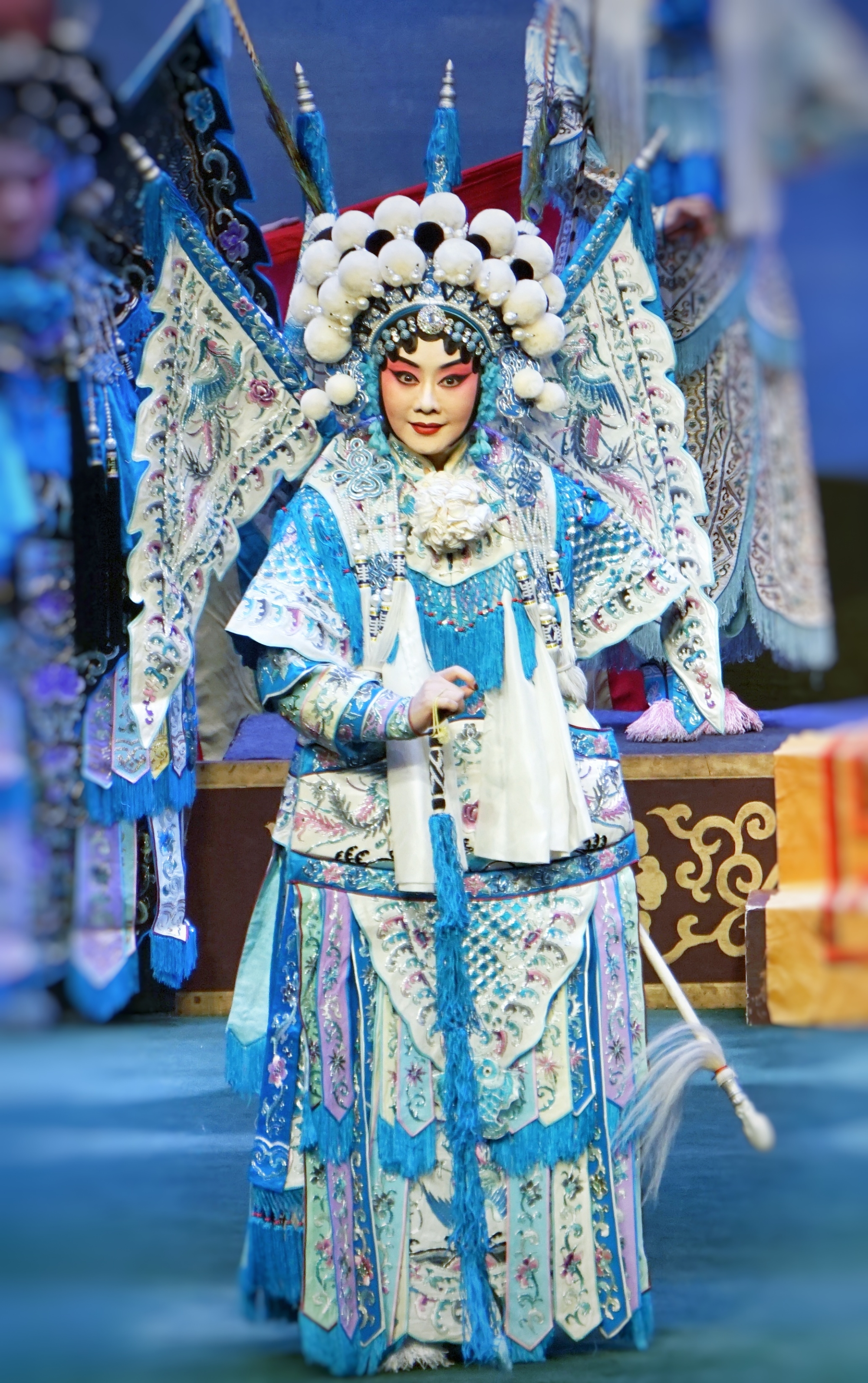
Li Shengsu (Peking opera)

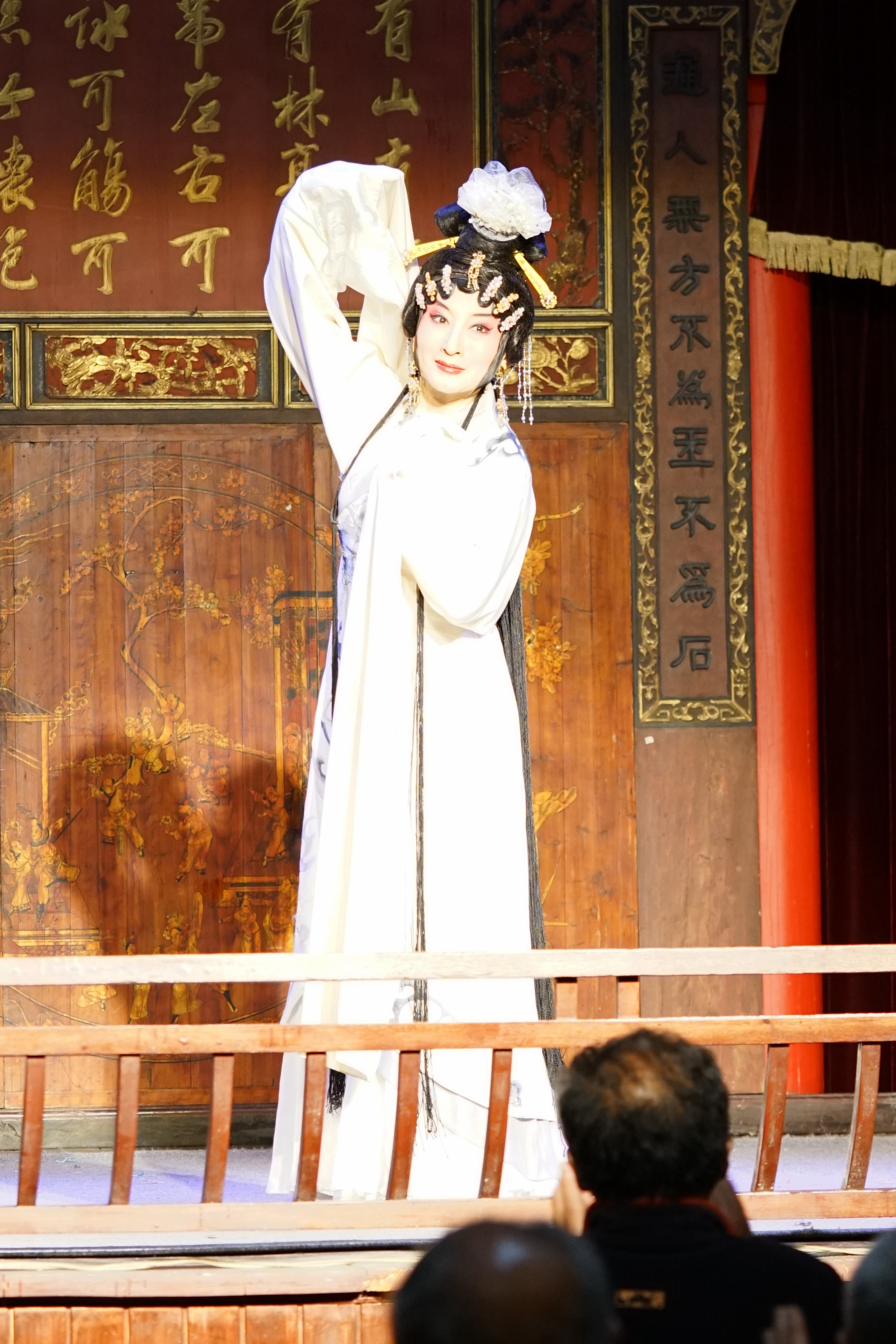
Chen Cheng (Huai opera)

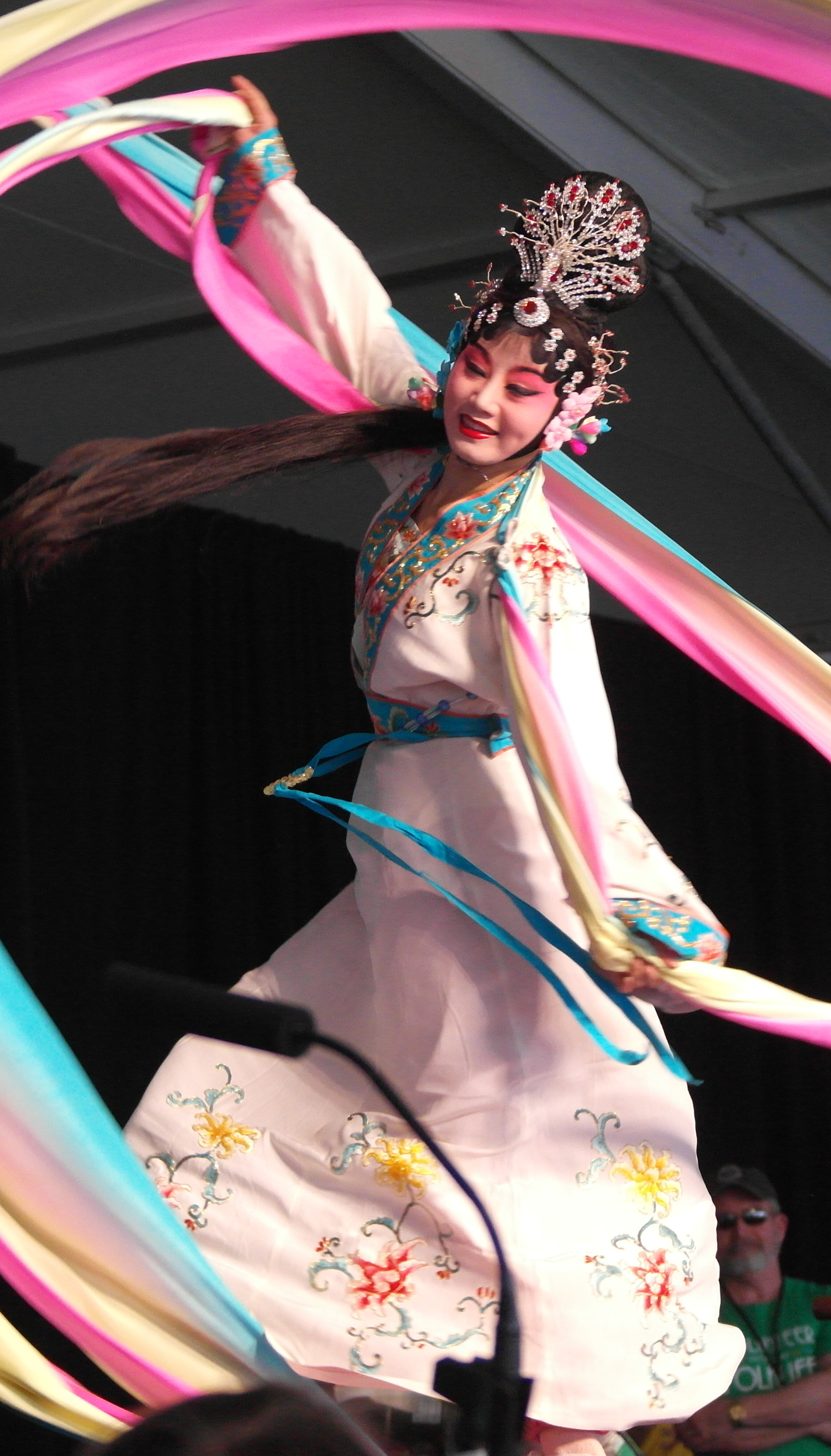
Yang Xiayun (Wu opera)

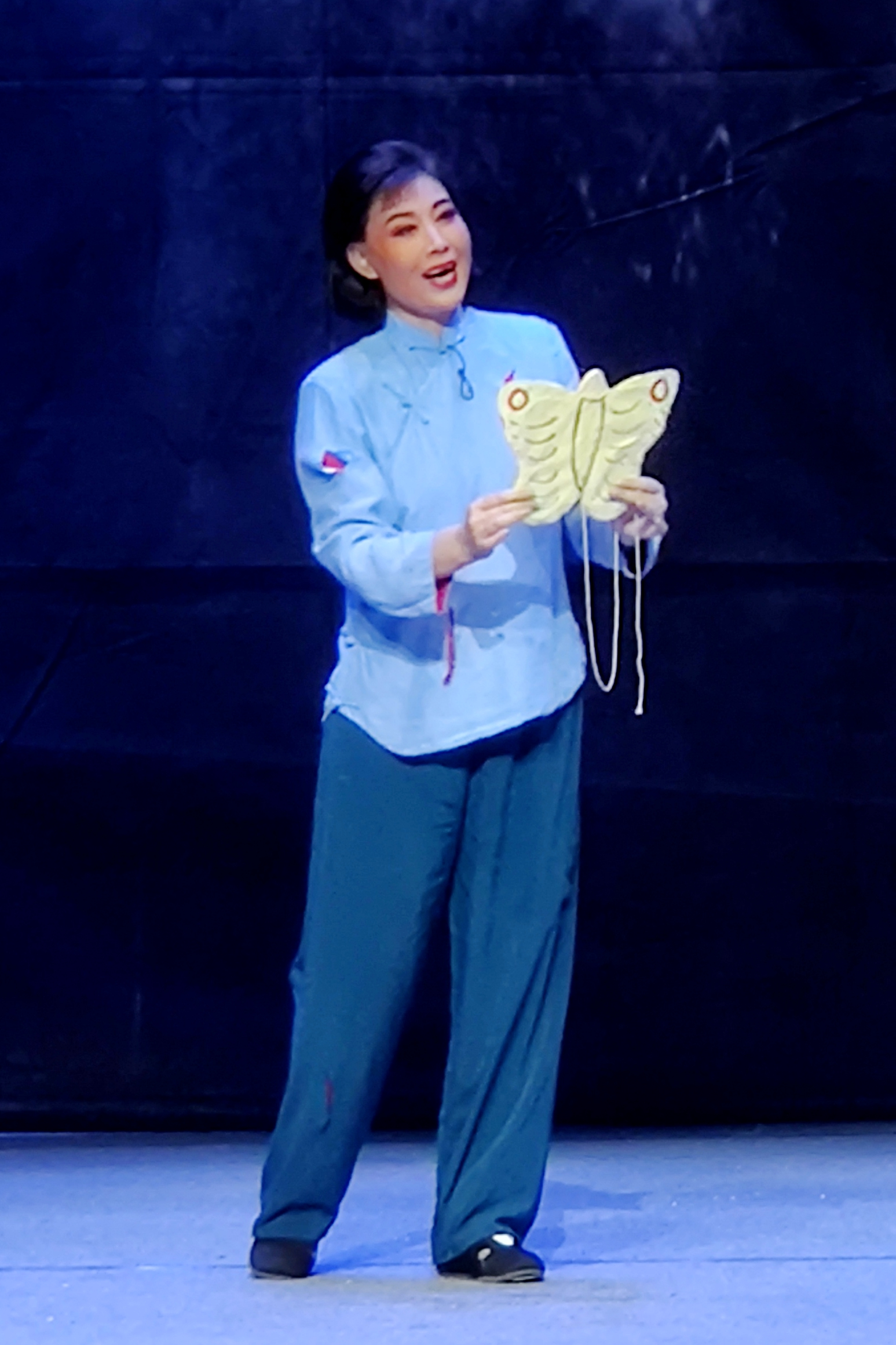
Fang Suzhen (Qu opera)

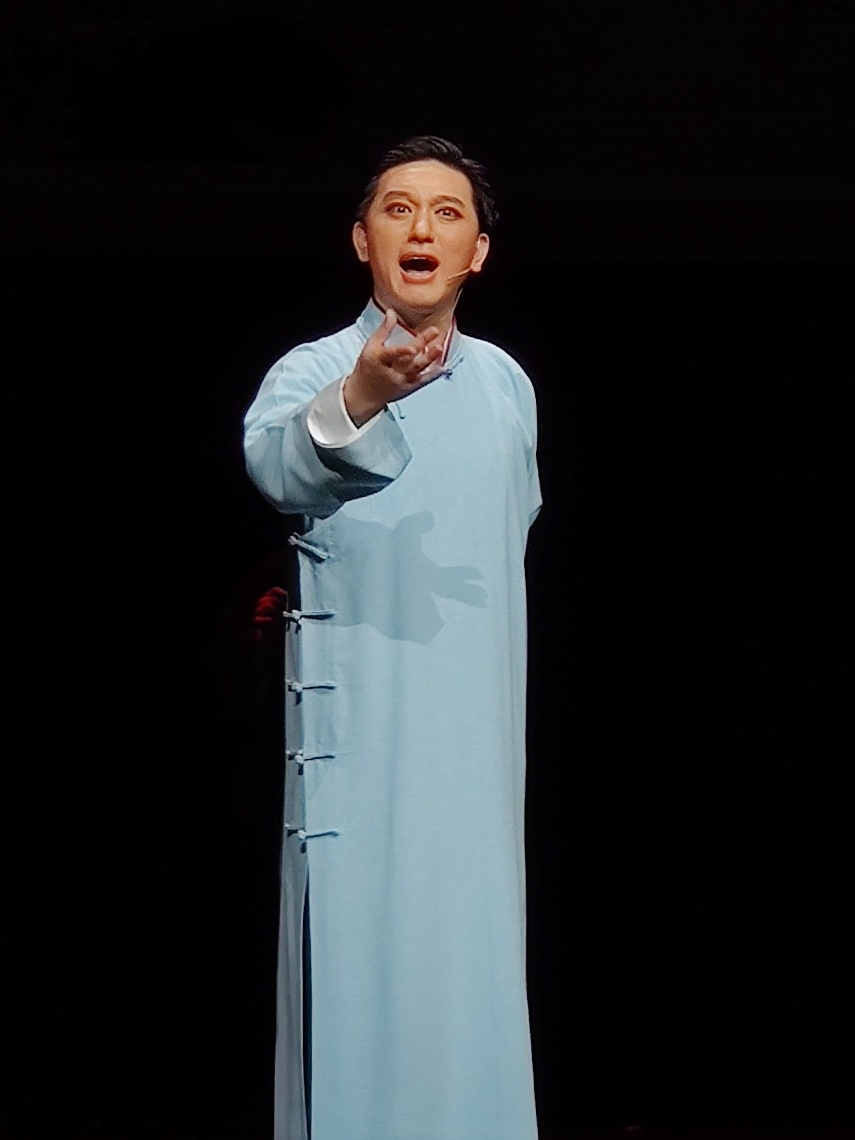
Fu Xiru (Peking opera)

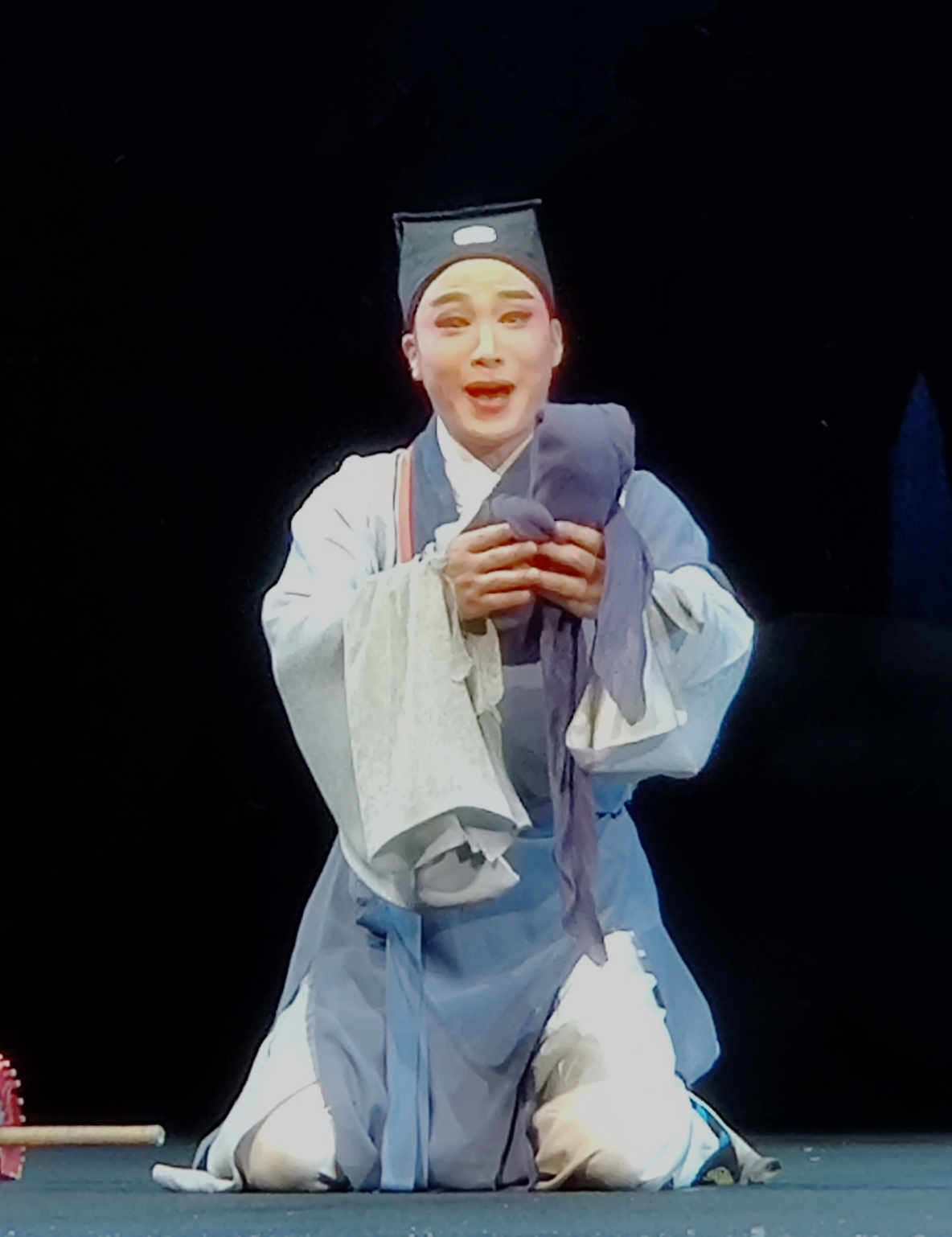
Zhou Dongliang (Wuxi opera)

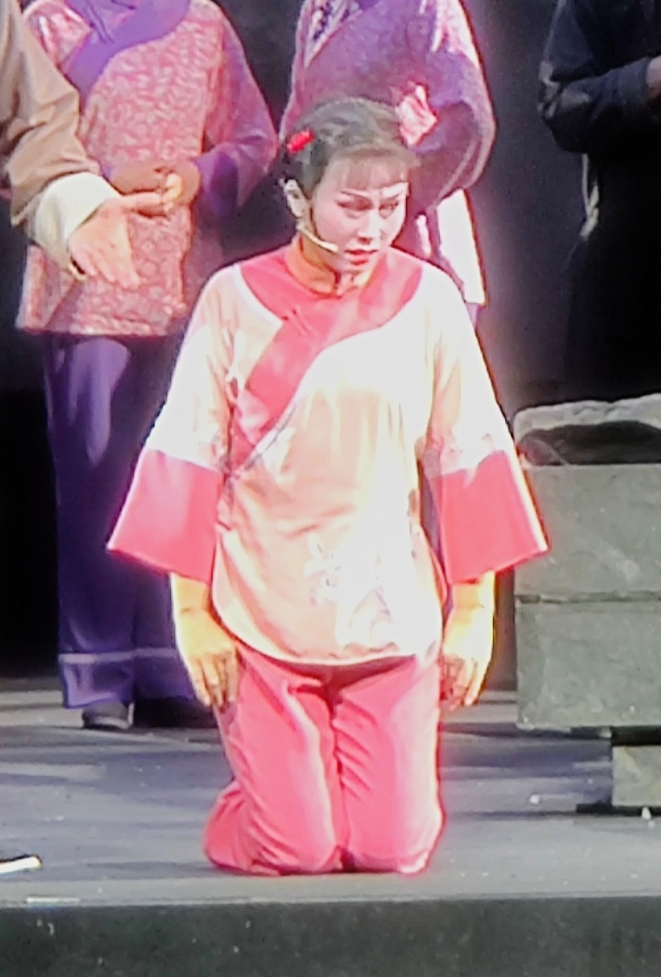
Huang Jinghui (Wuxi opera)

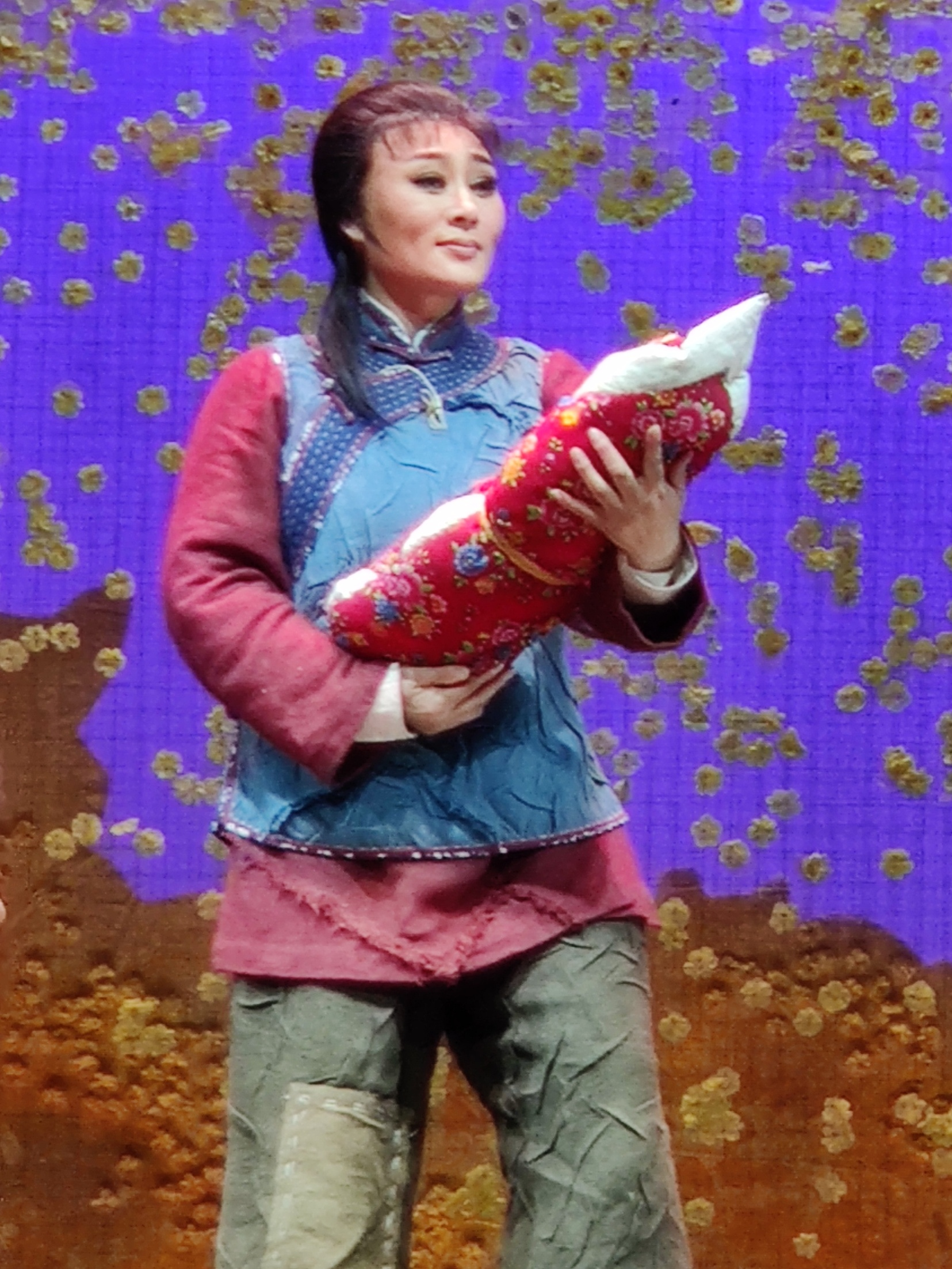
Chen Suqin (Shangdang bangzi)

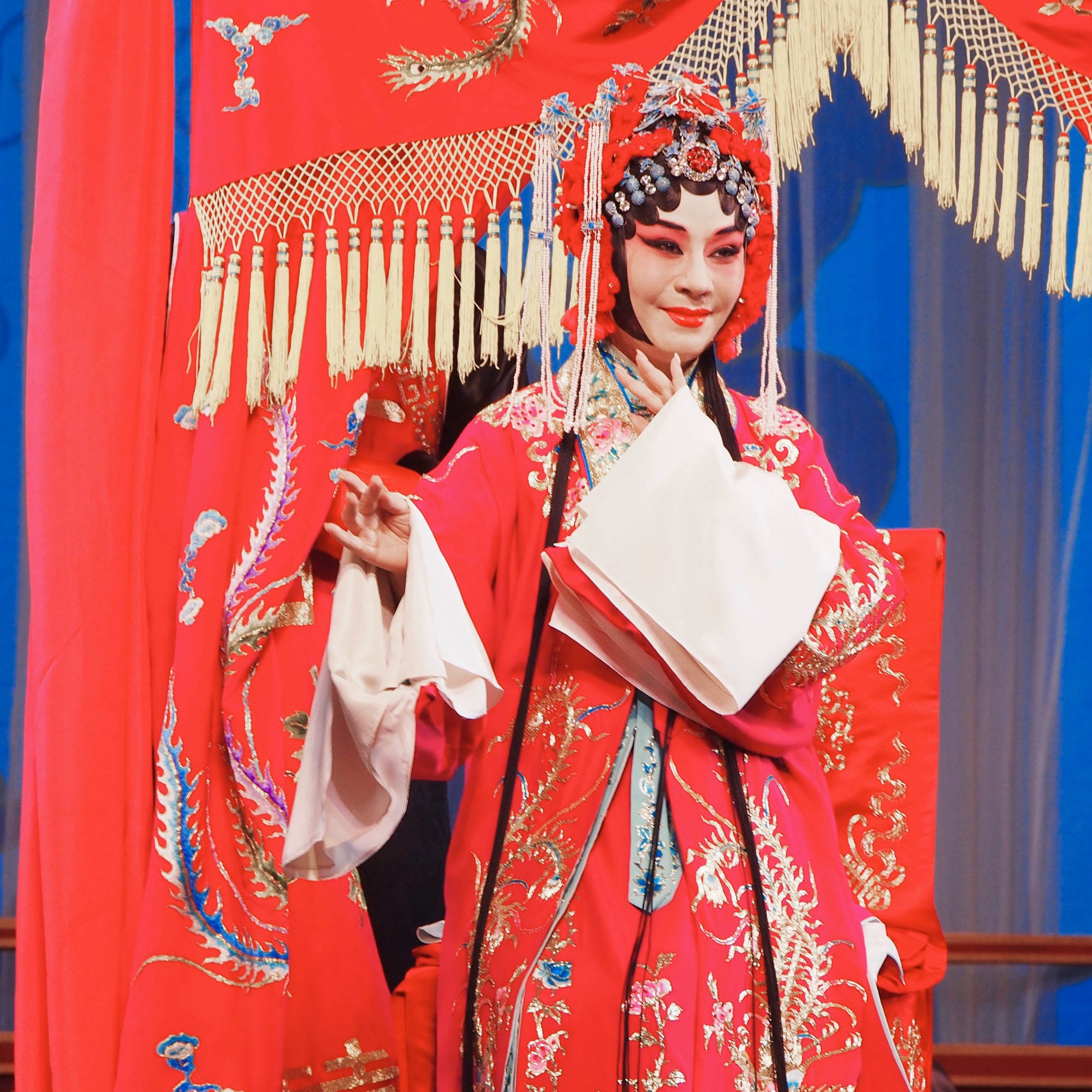
Chi Xiaoqiu (Peking opera)

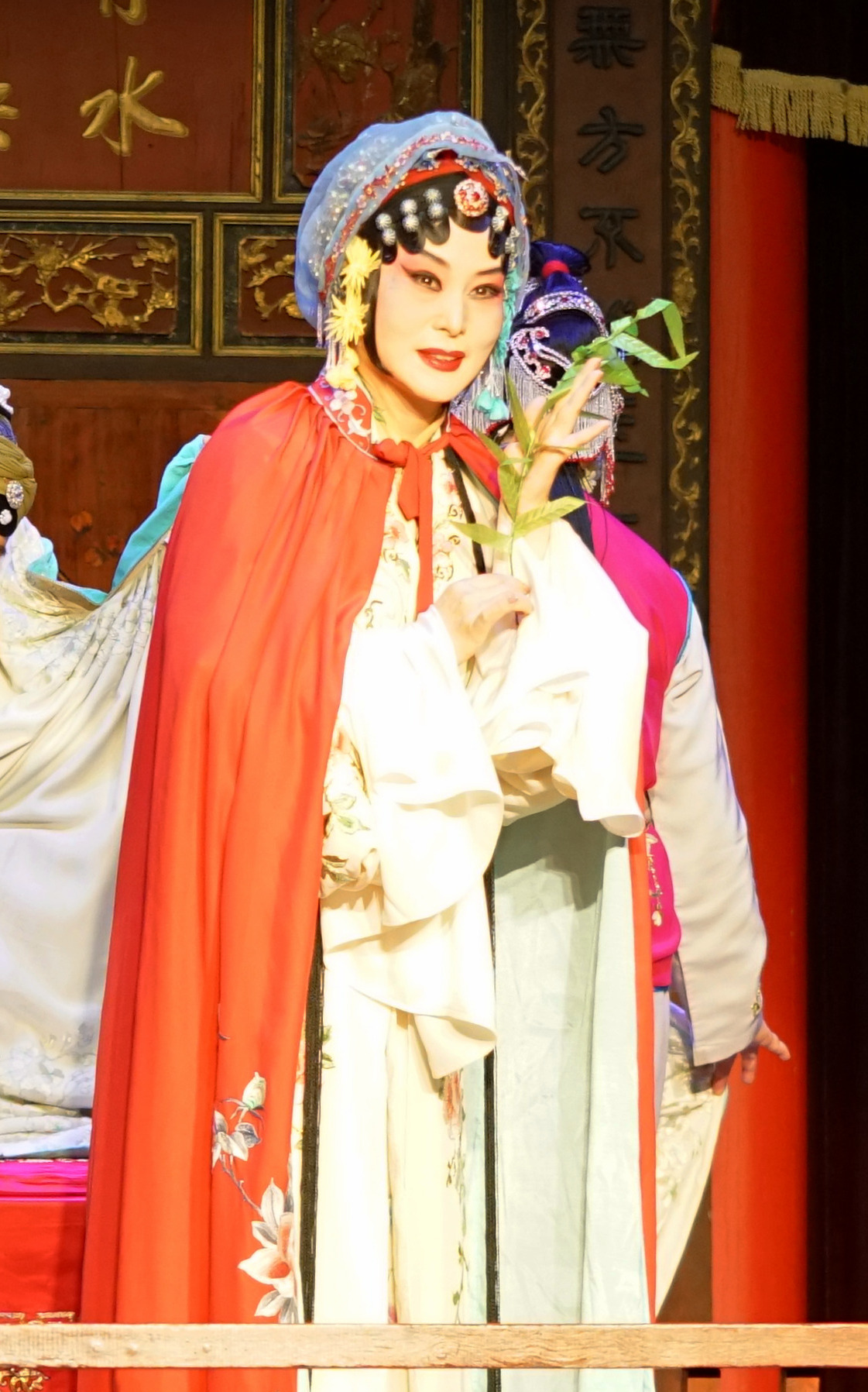
Kong Aiping (Kunqu)

Shi Jiejing (Shao opera)

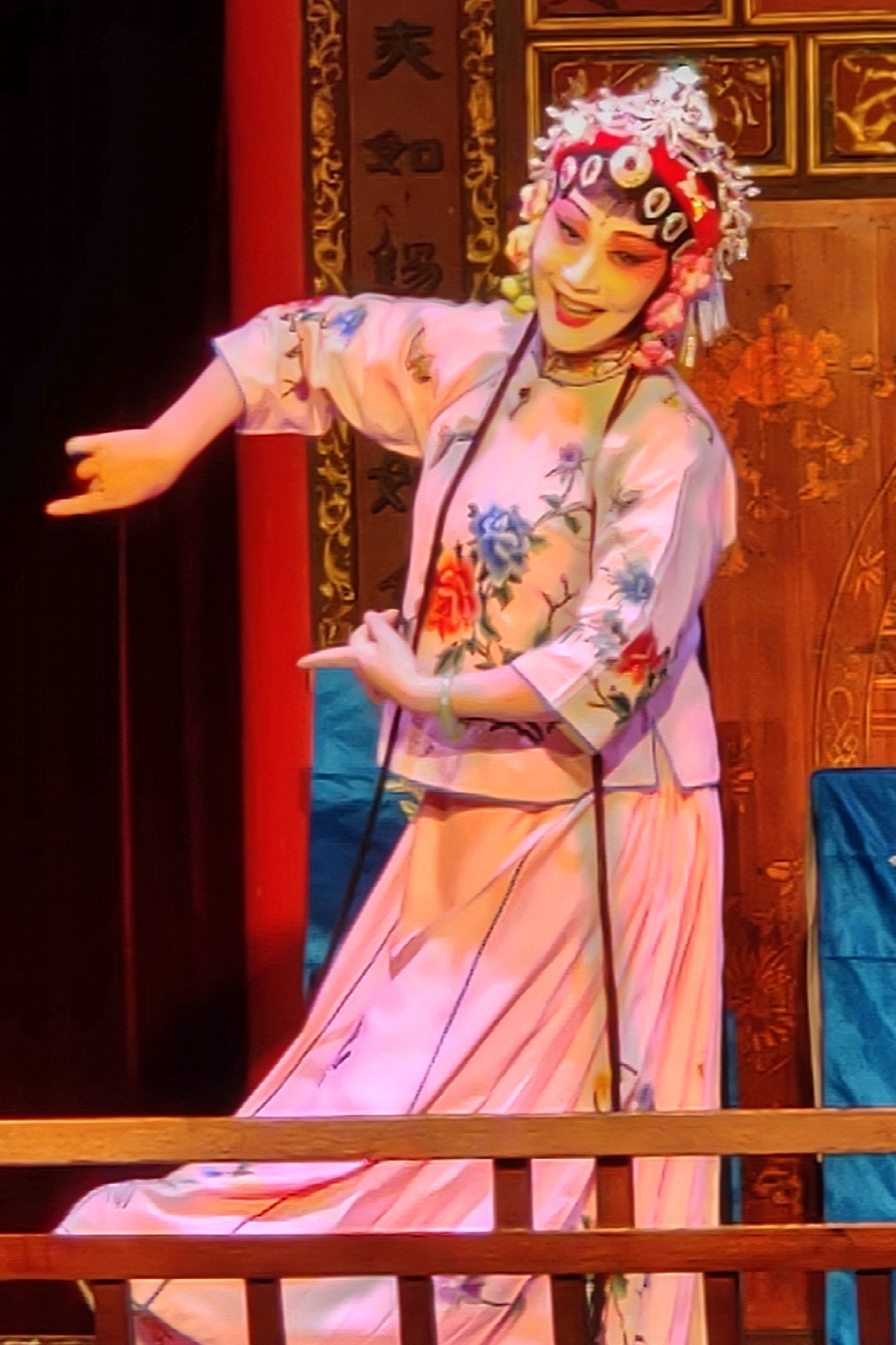
Xu Yaling (Huaihai opera)

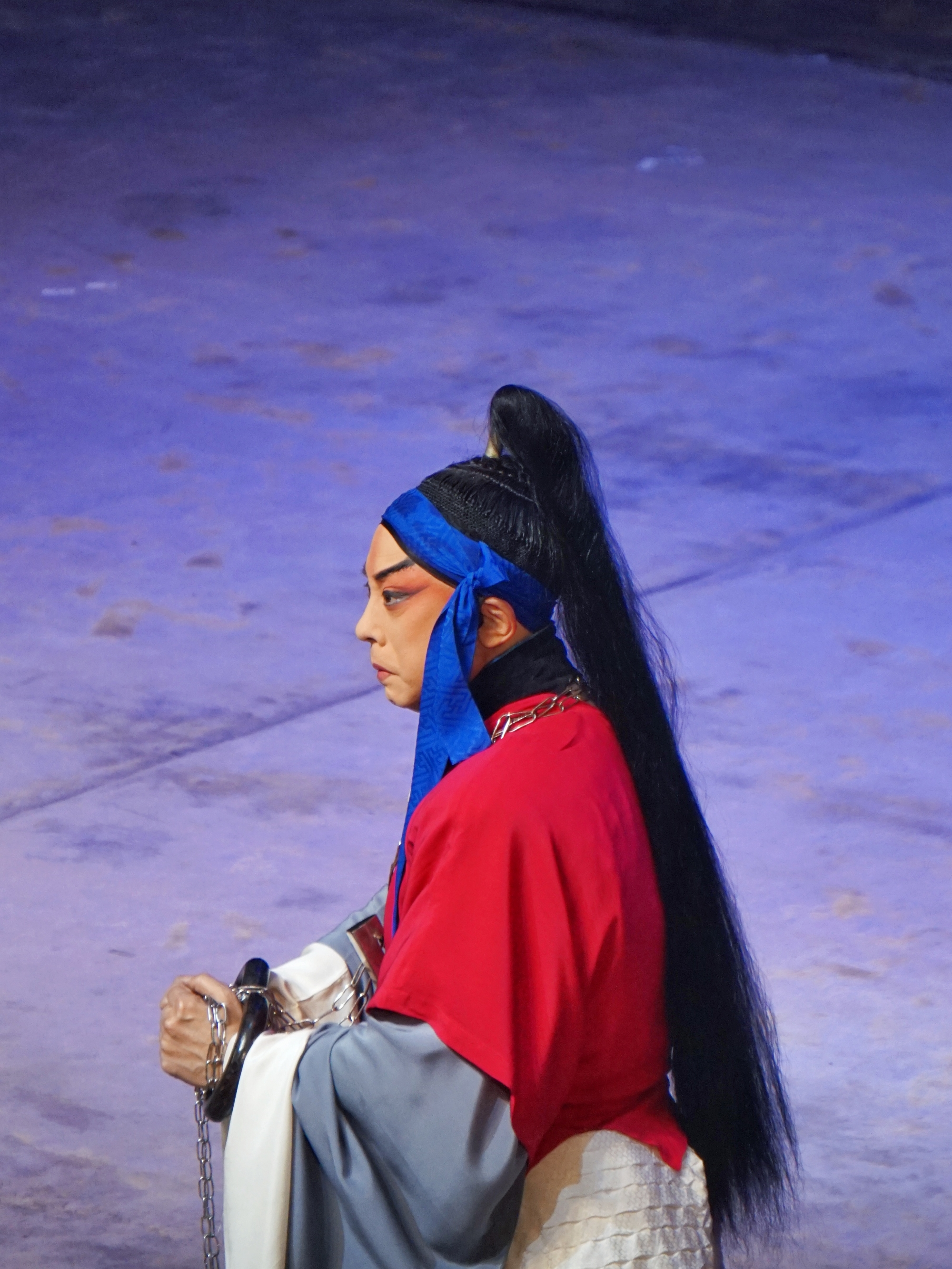
Yu Kuizhi (Peking opera)

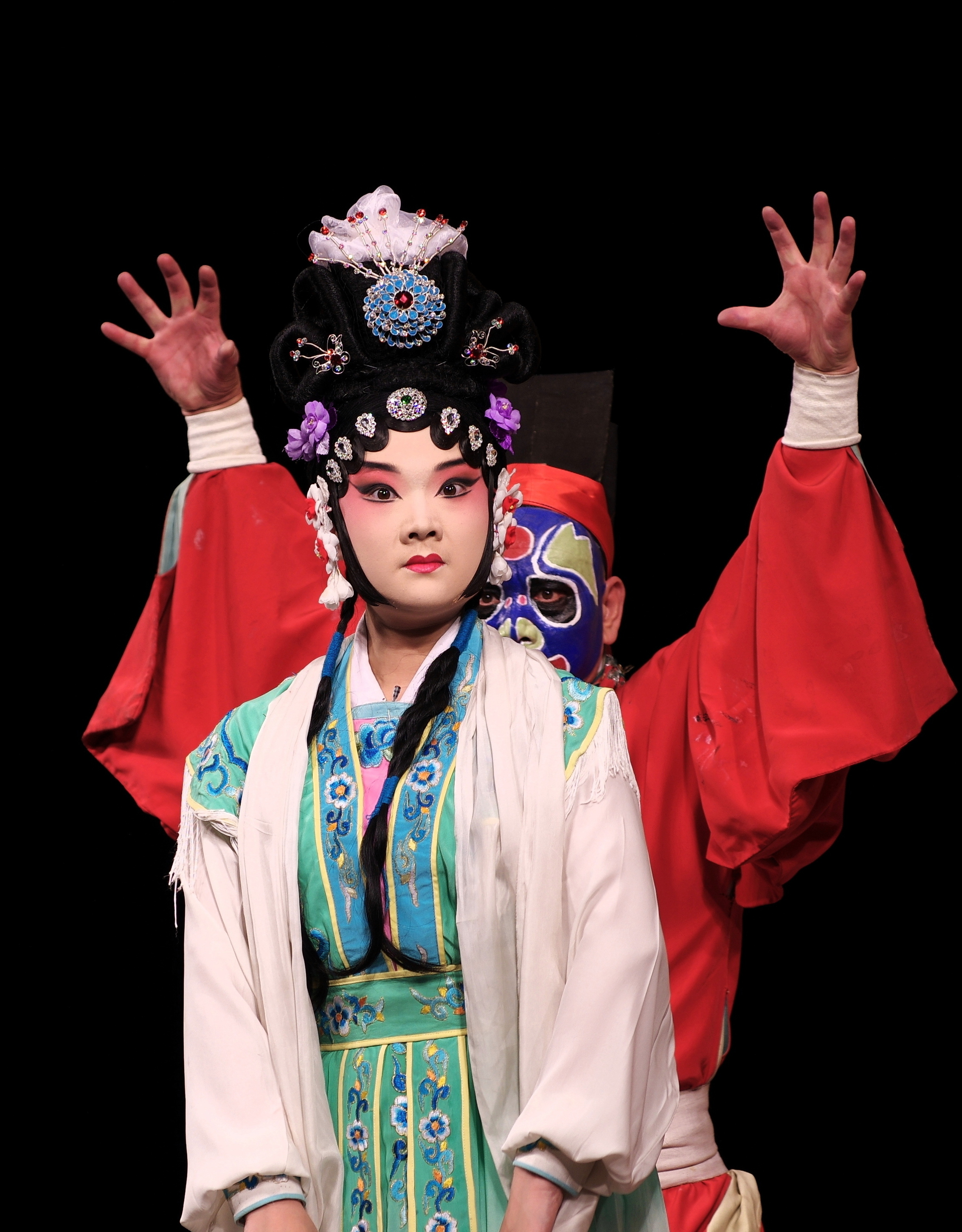
Yu Jia (Sichuan opera)

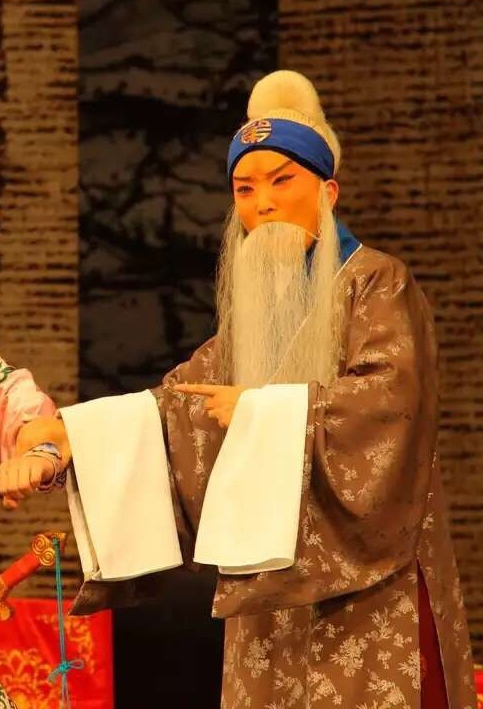
Wang Peiyu (Peking opera, male impersonator)

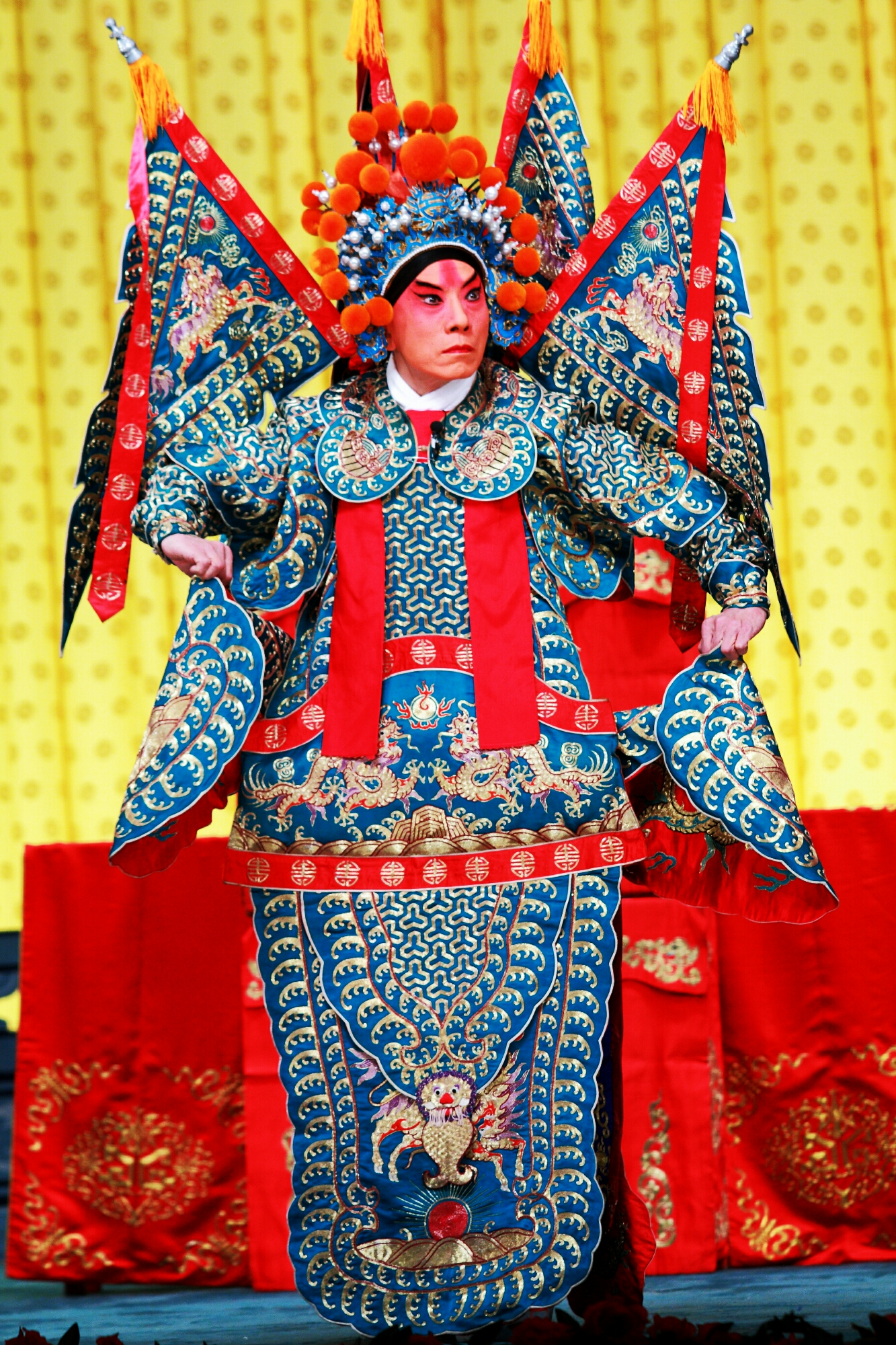
Zhang Youlin (Peking opera)

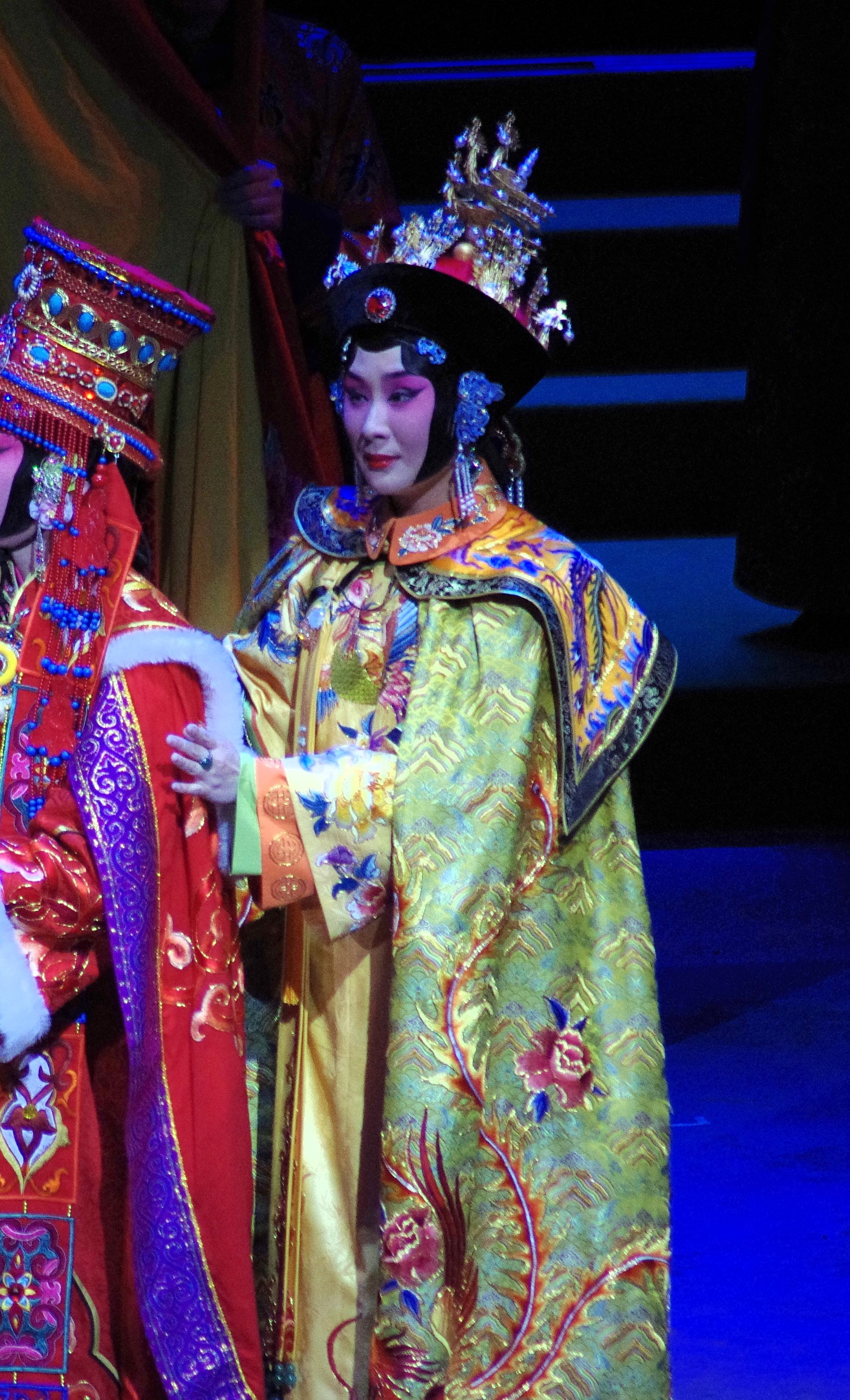
Lü Yang (Peking opera)
