= Zhejiang Yue Opera Troupe =

Background information
- Origin: Hangzhou, Zhejiang, China
- Genres: Yue opera
- Years active: 1949–present
- Website: www.zj-yjt.com

Chinese name
- Traditional Chinese: 浙江越劇團
- Simplified Chinese: 浙江越剧团
- Hanyu Pinyin: Zhèjiāng Yuèjù Tuán

The Zhejiang Yue Opera Troupe is a troupe in Hangzhou, China, founded in 1952 and dedicated to Yue opera. The Zhejiang Yue Opera Troupe is one of the most famous Yueju troupes.

== Repertoire ==
The list of Yueju works performed by Zhejiang Yue Opera Troupe include Kong Yiji (孔乙己), Liu Yuniang (柳玉娘), A Bird Account for Nine Deaths (一鸟九命), "Major Case in Qing dynasty" (乾嘉巨案), etc.

== Notable actors ==
The famous members of the troupe include: Yao Shuijuan, Zhou Yunjuan, Shu Jinxia, Wang Binmei, etc.
