= Magnolia Stage Award =

Chinese annual stage awards

The Shanghai Magnolia Stage Performance Awards (Chinese: 上海白玉兰戏剧表演艺术奖), commonly known as the Magnolia Stage Awards, are presented by Shanghai Media Group, Shanghai Theater Arts Journal Publisher, Shanghai Federation of Literary and Art Circles, Shanghai Performing Company, and Shanghai Cultural Development Foundation each year. The awards recognize excellence in dramas, dance, musicals, and Chinese operas performed in the city of Shanghai, China.

Launched in 1989, the Magnolia Stage Awards ceremony has evolved into a major theatrical event in China. For most Chinese opera performers, the Magnolia Stage Award is as much coveted as the Plum Blossom Prize.

A few international artists have also won the award, including Nonso Anozie, Brad Little, Sakata Tōjūrō IV, and Arturo Brachetti.

== Individual winners ==
=== Drama, musical, and dance ===
Year	Drama (including comedy)	Musical and dance
1989 (1st)	Lead role: Yu Luosheng, Yin Yanping (farce); Supporting: Zhang Xiaoming, Wei Zongwan	Musical: Wu Peiwen, Lei Yan; Ballet: Wang Qifeng
1990 (2nd)	Lead role: Xiu Jingshuang, Wei Ji'an, Xu Chengxian, Gu Yan; Supporting: Yin Zhusheng, Tao Zuijuan (farce)	Musical: Chen Haiyan, Qi Hui
1991 (3rd)	Lead role: Xi Meijuan, Ren Guangzhi, Lü Liang, Feng Guangquan, Wang Rugang (farce); Supporting: Lu Yingzi, Qian Cheng (farce), Qin Lei (farce), Hu Qingyun (farce)	Musical: Chen Haiyan
1992 (4th)	Lead role: Wu Shanshan, Pu Cunxin; Supporting role: Xu Xiaoqing, Fang Tao, Zhao Yi'ou	Musical: Dance: Zhang Yuzhao, Lu Jianping
1993 (5th)	Lead role: Zhu Yin, Yan Shuqin; Supporting: Liu Wanling, Bai Wenli, Hu Qingyun (farce)	Musical: Wei Song
1994 (6th)	Lead role: Xiao Huifang, Zhang Jiumei; Supporting: Ding Yuanhua	Musical: Sun Liying, Lian Longhai, Hu Naijun, Yue Caifu; Dance: Li Haixia
1995 (7th)	Lead role: Zhang Xianheng, Pan Weixing; Supporting: Cao Lei, Zhang Mingyu	Dance: Yang Xinhua
1996 (8th)	Lead role: Yin Zhusheng, Hong Bin, Feng Guoqing, Qin Lei (farce); Supporting: Lou Jicheng, Sheng Yaren	Musical: Qi Lan, Yan Shunkai, Yang Yuping
1997 (9th)	Lead role: Cheng Jianxun, Wang Zhiwen, Zhang Jinyuan, Leng Jiahua, Xu Lixia; Supporting: Han Weimin, Liu Jingfan	Musical: Cheng Guilan, Liao Changyong
1998 (10th)	Lead role: Xu Zheng	Musical: Yao Weimin; Dance: Liu Jing
1999 (11th)	Lead role: Lü Liang, Chen Guodian	Dance: Huang Doudou
2000 (12th)	Lead role: Song Guofeng, Tian Shui; Supporting: Wei Liping	Musical: Mi Dongfeng, Chen Shumin; Dance: Huang Doudou
2001 (13th)	Lead role: Ding Jiali, Zhang Qiuge; Supporting: Hao Ping	Musical: Weng Guosheng, Wan Shanhong, Shen Zhumin
2002 (14th)	Lead role: Song Yining, Qiang Yin; Supporting: Wei Chunguang, Gu Xiang (farce)	
2004 (15th)	Lead role: Yin Tao, Wang Xiaoling, Feng Xianzhen, Huang Mingmei, Nonso Anozie; Supporting: Fung Wai-hung, Lei Kesheng, Dong Xingshun, Zhu Yin, Wang Weiguo	Musical: Yang Xiaoyong
2006 (16th)	Lead role: Tony Leung Ka-fai, Wu Mian, Dong Huaiyu; Supporting: Tao Hong, Alice Lau Nga-lai, Xu Chengxian	Musical: Brad Little
2007 (17th)	Lead role: Hao Ping, Yu Dongjiang, Zhang Jinyuan, Zhang Yuchun, Yang Yi; Supporting: Zhang Dajing, Lou Jicheng, Lu Xi, Wang Yinan	Musical: Gao Manhua
2008 (18th)	Lead role: Xu Zheng, Calvin Li, Guo Donglin, He Bing; Supporting: Michael Hugo, Mark Henry Rowswell, Zhu Min	
2009 (19th)	Lead role: Zhen Yajing, Guo Jingfei, Ai Ping, Gong Renlong (farce); Supporting: Zhai Wanchen, Liu Jie, Zhou Yemang, Yao Qi'er (farce)	
2010 (20th)	Lead role: He Yu, Zhang Keqin (farce); Supporting: Shen Lei, Shao Yi	Musical: Zhang Lihui
2011 (21st)	Lead role: Li Jianyi; Supporting: Liu Xiaoliang, Yang Haoyu	Ballet: Ji Pingping
2012 (22nd)	Lead role: Chin Shih-chieh, Hong Tao, Tian Rui, Song Yining; Supporting: Guo Da	
2013 (23rd)	Lead role: Lou Jicheng, Gong Renlong (farce)	Musical: Tian Shui
2014 (24th)	Lead role: Zhu Yuanyuan, Hua Wen; Supporting: Chen Jiaoying	Ballet: Wu Husheng
2015 (25th)	Supporting: Xu Haili (farce)	Ballet: Zhu Yan
2016 (26th)	Lead role: Yao Jude, Zhang Lin; Supporting: Xu Jingwei	
2017 (27th)	Lead role: Ma Xiaoning, Chang Xiaochuan; Supporting: Zhu Jie	Ballet: Fan Xiaofeng
2018 (28th)	Lead role: Zhou Yemang, Qian Cheng (farce); Supporting: Zhang Qian	

=== Peking opera ===
Name	Award year	Gender	Birth	Hometown	Troupe	Role	School (master)
Shang Changrong	1989, 1991, 1999	Male	1940	Beijing	Shanghai Company	Jing	
Chen Shaoyun	1995, 2009	Male	1948	Huaihua, Hunan	Hunan Company	Sheng	Zhou Xinfang
Yan Xingpeng	1989	Male	1953	Shanghai	Shanghai Company	Sheng	Yan Jupeng
Fang Xiaoya	1989	Female	1947	Shanghai	Shanghai Company	Dan	
Bai Tao	1989	Male			Shanghai Company	Chou	
Li Shiyou	1990	Male	1963	Heilongjiang	Heilongjiang Company	Sheng	
Zhang Jianguo	1990	Male	1958	Jinzhou, Hebei	National Company	Sheng	Xi Xiaobo
Zhou Ping	1990	Female			Shanghai Company	Dan	
Li Shiji	1991	Female	1933	Shanghai	National Company	Dan	Cheng Yanqiu
He Shu	1991	Male			Shanghai Company	Sheng	
Ai Jinmei	1993	Female	1957	Changzhou, Jiangsu	Jiangsu Company	Dan	
Shi Yihong	1993	Female	1972	Shanghai	Shanghai Company	Dan	Mei Lanfang
Zhang Youlin	1994	Male	1955	Wen'an County, Hebei	Tianjin Company	Sheng	Zhang Shilin
Hu Xiaomao	1994	Male	1964	Xi'an, Shaanxi	Tianjin Company	Chou	
Zhu Shihui	1995	Male	1947	Jing County, Anhui	Hubei Company	Chou	
Zhu Fuxia	1995	Male	1936	Chongqing	Chongqing Company	Sheng	
Hu Xuan	1995	Female			Shanghai Company	Dan	Li Duokui
Li Jie	1996	Female	1972	Suining County, Jiangsu	Jiangsu Youth	Dan	Mei Lanfang
Tang Yuancai	1997	Male	1953	Suzhou, Jiangsu	Shanghai Company	Jing	Qiu Shengrong
Zhang Dafa	1997	Male			Shanghai Company	Jing	
Chen Lincang	1999	Male	1949	Lanzhou, Gansu	Gansu Company	Jing	
Guan Huai	1999	Male	1956	Wuhan, Hubei	Shanghai Company	Sheng	
Huang Xiaoci	1999	Female	1943	Beijing	Jiangsu Company	Dan	
Zhao Baoxiu	2000	Female	1948	Beijing	Company of Beijing	Dan	
Zhang Ke	2000	Male	1962	Tianjin	Tianjin Youth	Sheng	Yang Baosen
Yang Chi	2000	Male	1961	Dalian, Liaoning	Dalian Company	Sheng	Yuan Shihai
Ye Shaolan	2001	Male	1943	Taihu County, Anhui	Company of Beijing	Sheng	Ye Shenglan
Wang Peiyu	2001	Female	1978	Suzhou, Jiangsu	Shanghai Company	Sheng	Yu Shuyan
Li Baochun	2001	Male	1950	Beijing	Taipei Theatre	Sheng	Ma Lianliang
Dong Yuanyuan	2001	Female	1964	Tianjin	Hong Kong Company	Dan	Mei Lanfang
Hou Danmei	2001	Female	1964	Guiyang, Guizhou	Guiyang Company	Dan	Guan Sushuang
Zhang Yuefu	2001	Male		Tianjin	Heilongjiang Company	Sheng	Gao Qingkui
Wang Ping	2002	Male	1954	Tianjin	Tianjin Company	Sheng	
Wang Rongrong	2002	Female	1961	Anshan, Liaoning	Company of Beijing	Dan	Zhang Junqiu
Deng Mowei	2002	Male			Tianjin Company	Jing	
Sun Yumin	2004	Female	1940	Shanghai	Company of Beijing	Dan	Xun Huisheng
Yang Chunxia	2004	Female	1943	Shanghai	National Company	Dan	
Wei Haimin	2004	Female	1957	New Taipei, Taiwan	GuoGuang Company	Dan	Mei Lanfang
Liu Jia	2004	Female			Shanghai Company	Dan	
Wang Lijun	2006	Male	1957	Tianjin	Tianjin Youth	Sheng	
Liu Wei	2006	Female	1968	Wuhan, Hubei	Wuhan Company	Dan	
Chen Youling	2006	Female	1955	Wuhan, Hubei	Wuhan Company	Dan	
Jin Xiquan	2007	Male		Hebei	Shanghai Company	Sheng	Ye Shenglan
Lü Yang	2007	Female		Tianjin	Tianjin Company	Dan	Mei Lanfang
Li Peihong	2008	Female	1964	Tianjin	Tianjin Youth	Dan	Cheng Yanqiu
Yan Qinggu	2009	Male	1970	Shanghai	Shanghai Company	Chou	
An Ping	2009	Male	1968	Tianjin	Shanghai Company	Jing	Qiu Shengrong
Guo Ruiyue	2009	Female			Shanghai Company	Dan	Mei Lanfang
Ni Maocai	2010	Male	1965	Zhengding County, Hebei	Jilin Company	Sheng	Gao Qingkui
Zhao Yuhua	2010	Female	1966	Yiyang County, Henan	Shijiazhuang Company	Dan	
Jiang Yishan	2011	Female	1978	Shenyang, Liaoning	Company of Beijing	Dan	
Chang Qiuyue	2011	Female	1978	Beijing	Company of Beijing	Dan	
Tian Lei	2012	Male	1980	Huantai County, Shandong	Fujian Company	Sheng	Ma Lianliang
Ling Ke	2012	Male	1979	Changsha, Hunan	Tianjin Company	Sheng	Yu Shuyan
Wang Quan	2013	Male			Jilin Company	Chou	
Huang Qifeng	2014	Male		Tianjin	Tianjin Company	Sheng	
Cheng Lianqun	2015	Female		Chongqing	Chongqing Company	Dan	
Zhao Qun	2015	Female		Tianjin	Shanghai Academy	Dan	Zhang Junqiu
Xiong Mingxia	2015	Female	1976	Yichang, Hubei	Shanghai Company	Dan	Zhao Yanxia
Dou Xiaoxuan	2016	Female	1985	Tianjin	Company of Beijing	Dan	Mei Lanfang
Fu Xiru	2016	Male	1981		Shanghai Company	Sheng	
Shu Tong	2017	Male	1972	Beijing	National Academy	Jing	
Li Hong	2017	Female	1977		Tianjin Company	Dan	
Yang Yanan	2017	Female	1986	Baoding, Hebei	Shanghai Company	Dan	
Wang Yueling	2018	Female	1981	Jiamusi, Heilongjiang	Company of Beijing	Dan	
Feng Yun	2018	Female	1982	Shenyang, Liaoning	Shanghai Company	Dan	

=== Yue opera ===
Name	Award year	Gender	Birth	Hometown	Troupe	Role	School (master)
Qian Huili	1991, 1993, 2016	Female	1963	Zhuji, Zhejiang	Shanghai Troupe	Sheng (young)	Xu Yulan
Mao Weitao	1992, 1998	Female	1962	Tongxiang, Zhejiang	Zhejiang Xiaobaihua	Sheng (young)	Yin Guifang
Fang Yafen	1992, 2006	Female	1965	Ningbo, Zhejiang	Shanghai Troupe	Dan	Yuan Xuefen
Shi Jihua	1989	Male	1940	Shanghai	Shanghai Troupe	Sheng (young)	
Chen Lan	1990	Female	1957	Zhoushan, Zhejiang	Sheng County Troupe	Dan	Fu Quanxiang
Zhao Zhigang	1991	Male	1962	Shanghai	Shanghai Troupe	Sheng (young)	Yin Guifang
Han Tingting	1992	Female	1964	Shanghai	Hongkou Troupe	Sheng (young)	Fan Ruijuan
Zhang Ruihong	1993	Female	1963	Shaoxing, Zhejiang	Shanghai Troupe	Sheng (young)	Fan Ruijuan
Dong Kedi	1998	Female	1960	Xiangshan County, Zhejiang	Zhejiang Xiaobaihua	Sheng (old)	Zhang Guifeng
Yan Jia	1998	Female	1970	Jiaxing, Zhejiang	Zhejiang Xiaobaihua	Dan	Fu Quanxiang
Liu Jue	1998	Male	1940	Suzhou, Jiangsu	Shanghai Troupe	Sheng (young)	Xu Yulan
Wang Zhiping	2001	Female	1968	Zhoushan, Zhejiang	Shanghai Troupe	Dan	Wang Wenjuan
Tao Qi	2002	Female	1963	Suzhou, Jiangsu	Nanjing Troupe	Dan	Yuan Xuefen
Wu Fenghua	2004	Female	1970	Shaoxing, Zhejiang	Shaoxing Xiaobaihua	Sheng (young)	Fan Ruijuan
Zhou Yujun	2009	Female	1979	Pujiang County, Zhejiang	Hangzhou Troupe	Dan	Lü Ruiying
Chen Shi	2013	Female	1981		Zhao Studio	Dan	Fu Quanxiang
Wang Jun'an	2014	Female	1970	Shengzhou, Zhejiang	Fujian Fanghua	Sheng (young)	Yin Guifang
Yang Tingna	2014	Female	1977	Xinchang County, Zhejiang	Shanghai Troupe	Sheng (young)	Xu Yulan
Huang Hui	2015	Female	1965	Shanghai	Shanghai Troupe	Sheng (young)	Lu Jinhua
Li Xiaoxu	2016	Female	1987	Jiangsu	Nanjing Troupe	Sheng (young)	Bi Chunfang
Chen Fei	2017	Female	1969	Shaoxing, Zhejiang	Shaoxing Xiaobaihua	Dan	Fu Quanxiang
Cai Yan	2018	Female	1985		Shanghai Troupe	Sheng (old)	Zhang Guifeng

=== Other genres ===
- Ping opera: Liu Ping (1997), Zeng Zhaojuan (2004), Liu Xiurong (2007), Wang Ping (2018)
- Yang opera: Xu Xiufang (1994), Wang Lingfen (1995), Li Zhengcheng (2011), Gong Lili (2016)
- Wuju: Lou Qiaozhu (2009), Yang Xiayun (2013), Lou Sheng (2014), Zhu Yuanhao (2015)
- Longjiang opera: Bai Shuxian (1991), Li Ruigang (1991), Li Xuefei (2000)
- Pu opera: Ren Genxin (2002), Wang Qingli (2013), Kong Xiangdong (2013)
- Dian opera: Zhou Weihua (1998), Yang Mao (1998), Feng Yongmei (1999)
- Yong opera: Wang Jinwen (1995, 2002), Wo Xinkang (2011)
- Hui opera: Li Longbin (1991), Zhang Min (1992),
- Teochew opera: Fang Zhanrong (1995), Lin Bifang (2002)
- Jilin opera: Wang Guifen (1994), Ma Shijie (1994)
- Su opera: Wang Fang (2014), Zhang Tangbing (2014)
- Hebei bangzi: Wang Hongling (2017), Wang Yinghui (2017)
- Meihu opera: Xu Aiying (1991), Li Mei (2004)
- Liyuan opera: Zeng Jingping (1990), Gong Wanli (1999)
- Lüju: Gao Jing (1992)
- Qu opera: Mo Qi (1999)
- Tea-picking opera: Liu Xianghe (2001)
- Min opera: Chen Hongxiang (2004)
- Huaihai opera: Wu Ling (2011)
- Sixian opera: Zhang Baoying (2010)
- Qin opera: Bian Xiao (2012)
- Flower-drum opera: Li Junmei (2016)
- Ou opera: Cai Xiaoqiu (2018)
- Zhuang opera: Tang Hongyou (2018)
