= Han opera =

Han opera (simplified Chinese: 汉剧; traditional Chinese: 漢劇; pinyin: Hànjù) is a form of Chinese opera, previously known as "Chu tone" (楚調) or "Han tone" (漢調). It arose in the middle Qing dynasty period in Hubei, and later spread to Hunan, Shaanxi, and part of Sichuan. The music of Han opera incorporates the Xipi (西皮) and Erhuang (二黄) styles. There are ten roles in Han opera: Mo (末), Jing, Sheng, Dan, Chou, Wai (外), Xiao (小), Tie (貼), Fu (夫), and Za (雜).

== Sources ==
- chinaculture.org. "Han Opera". Hubei provincial government.
