= Birthday Celebration by Five Daughters =

Birthday Celebration by Five Daughters (五女拜壽) is a Chinese Yue opera play written by Gu Xidong (顾锡东) in 1982, set in the Ming dynasty before and after the fall of Yan Song. There is some similarity between the story and that of King Lear, although Gu Xidong never acknowledged any Shakespearean influence. The story emphasizes the importance of traditional Confucian values such as filial piety, which like traditional theatre had been attacked and suppressed during the Cultural Revolution (1966–1976).

In 1984, the stage production of the newly founded, female-only Zhejiang Xiaobaihua Yue Opera Troupe was made into a film directed by Lu Jianhua (陆建华) and Yu Zhongxiao (于中效). This film was a massive national hit, winning Best Opera Film (a brand new category) at the 5th Golden Rooster Awards, and catapulting the young Zhejiang Xiaobaihua actresses like He Ying (何英), He Saifei, Dong Kedi, Mao Weitao, Fang Xuewen (方雪雯) and Tao Huimin (then all aged 18–24) into the national spotlight. The idea that this film began China's "celebrity era" has even been forwarded.

From 1984 to 2004, Zhejiang Xiaobaihua alone performed the play close to 600 times, including some staged in Hong Kong (1983–84), Singapore (1986), Thailand (1992), and Taiwan (1993). When the stars of the 1984 film reunited in 2004 for a New Year's Eve performance in Hangzhou, CCTV-11 decided to air the performance live — the first Yue opera live broadcast in CCTV history. Xiaobaihua revived the play in 2018, and starred Chen Lijun and Li Yunxiao in lead roles.

The play has been transplanted into many other Chinese opera genres, including Yue opera, Huangmei opera, Cantonese opera, Qinqiang, Taiwanese opera, Wuju, Wuxi opera, and Teochew opera. In 2003, it was adapted into a TV series starring Ning Jing, Li Qian, and Fu Yiwei.
