= Wang Peiyu =

Chinese Peking opera singer-actress (born 1978)

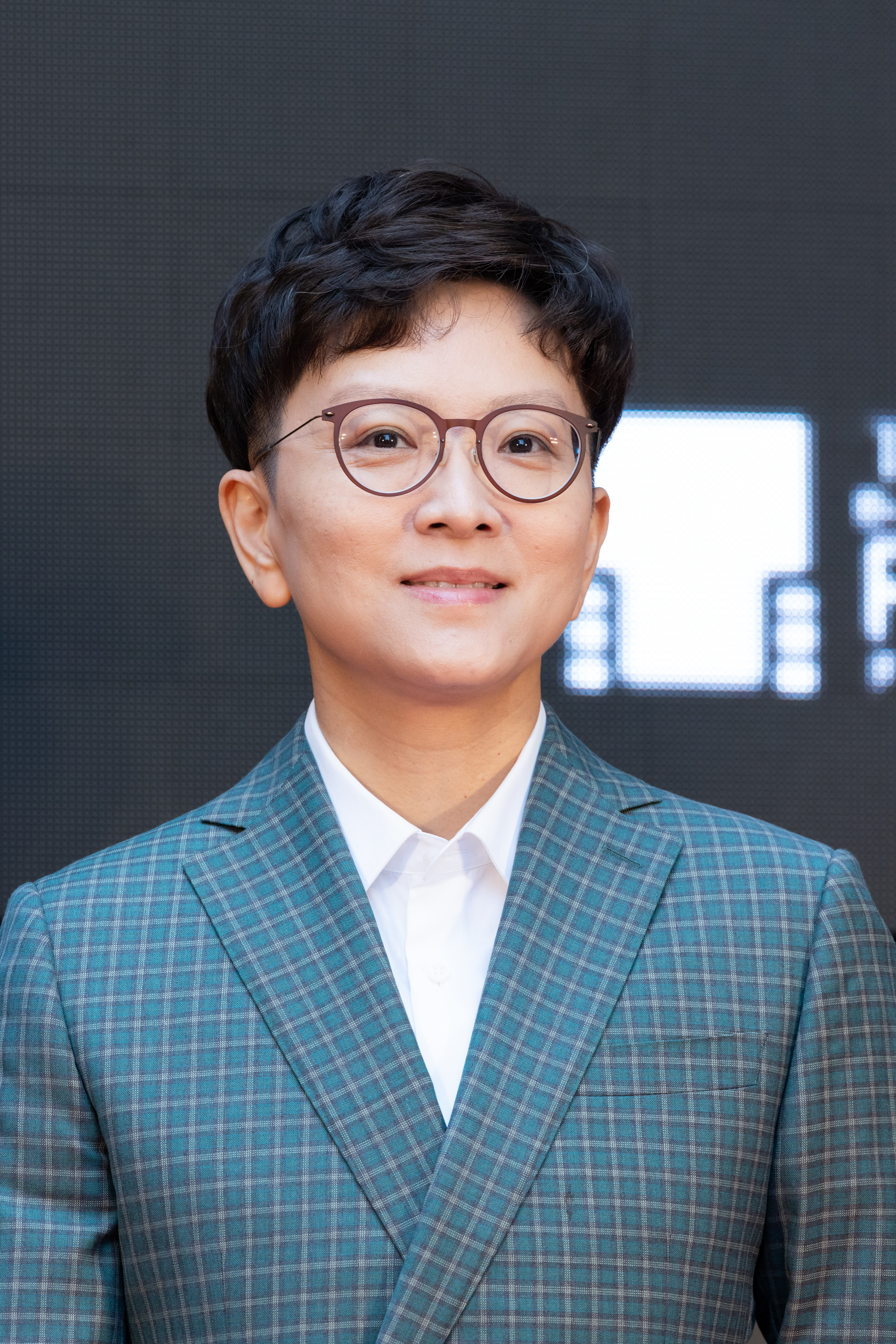
- Wang at the 37th Tokyo International Film Festival in 2024
- Born: March 4, 1978 (age 48); Suzhou, Jiangsu, China
- Education: Shanghai Normal University; National Academy of Chinese Theatre Arts
- Occupation: Peking opera performer
- Employer: Shanghai Jingju Theatre Company
- Known for: Old sheng roles
- Style: Yu (Yu Shuyan) school

Chinese name
- Chinese: 王珮瑜
Transcriptions
Standard Mandarin
- Hanyu Pinyin: Wáng Pèiyú

Wang Peiyu (born 4 March 1978) is a Chinese Peking opera singer-actress who plays old sheng (male) roles. A winner of the Plum Blossom Award and the Magnolia Stage Award, Wang Peiyu is also known for her innovative efforts to popularize Peking opera among young people. Helped by her androgynous looks and a strong social media presence, Wang has in recent years built a large fanbase, as demonstrated by her almost one and a half million fans on Sina Weibo.
