= Yang Yuelou =

- Traditional Chinese: 楊月樓
- Simplified Chinese: 杨月楼
Transcriptions
Standard Mandarin
- Hanyu Pinyin: Yáng Yuèlóu

Yang Yuelou (1844–17 July 1890) was a Qing dynasty Peking opera artist based in Beijing, who specialized in playing sheng roles, or men. He is probably best known today for his 1873 conviction in Shanghai, under judicial torture, of abducting the daughter of a wealthy comprador. This case drew widespread attention at the time, and much later was adapted to film and television.

His third son Yang Xiaolou was also a famous Peking opera performer.

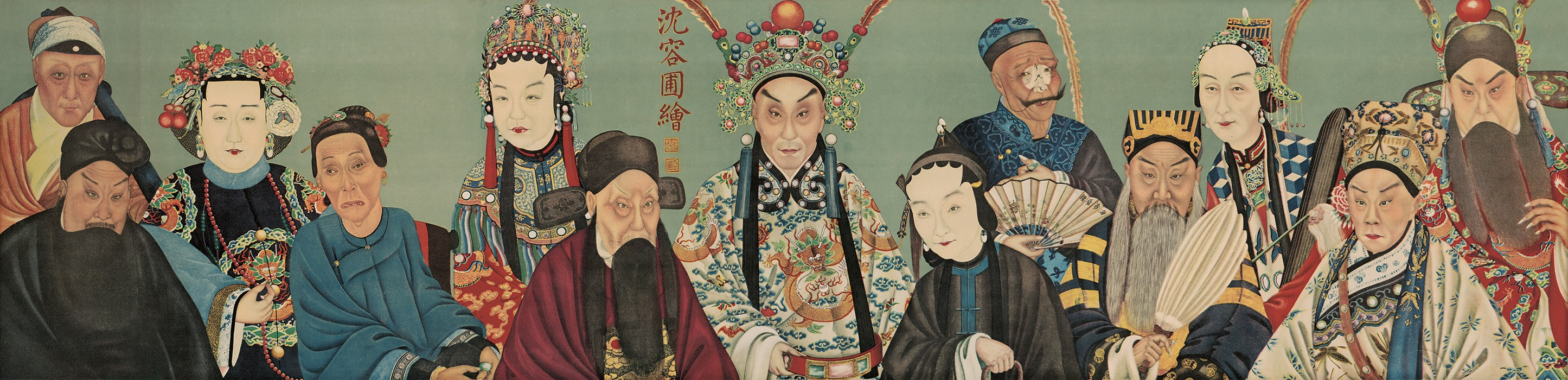
"Thirteen Masters of the Tongzhi and Guangxu Reigns" (同光十三絕), a late Qing dynasty painting by Shen Rongpu (沈容圃). Yang Yuelou is 1st from right, dressed in the role of Yang Yanhui.

== In popular culture ==
Several actors have starred as Yang Yuelou in dramatizations of his 1873 case: Henry Lo in the 1986 Hong Kong TV series Four Strange Cases of the Late Qing Dynasty (清末四大奇案), Xu Xiaojian in the 1996 Chinese TV series The Incredible Injustice to an Opera Actor (粉墨奇冤), and Mark Cheng in the 1999 Chinese martial arts film Tragedy On and Off the Stage (紅伶奇冤).
