= Lu Shengkui =

- Traditional Chinese: 盧勝奎
- Simplified Chinese: 卢胜奎
Transcriptions
Standard Mandarin
- Hanyu Pinyin: Lú Shèngkuí

Lu Shengkui (1822–1889) was a Qing dynasty Peking opera artist and dramatist based in Beijing who specialized in laosheng roles, or old gentlemen. Unlike most performers, he was from a literate family of officials and received a good early education. He only joined the theatre troupe after failing the imperial examination. In addition to performing, he wrote several plays for the Three Celebrations Company (三慶班), based on older story cycles.

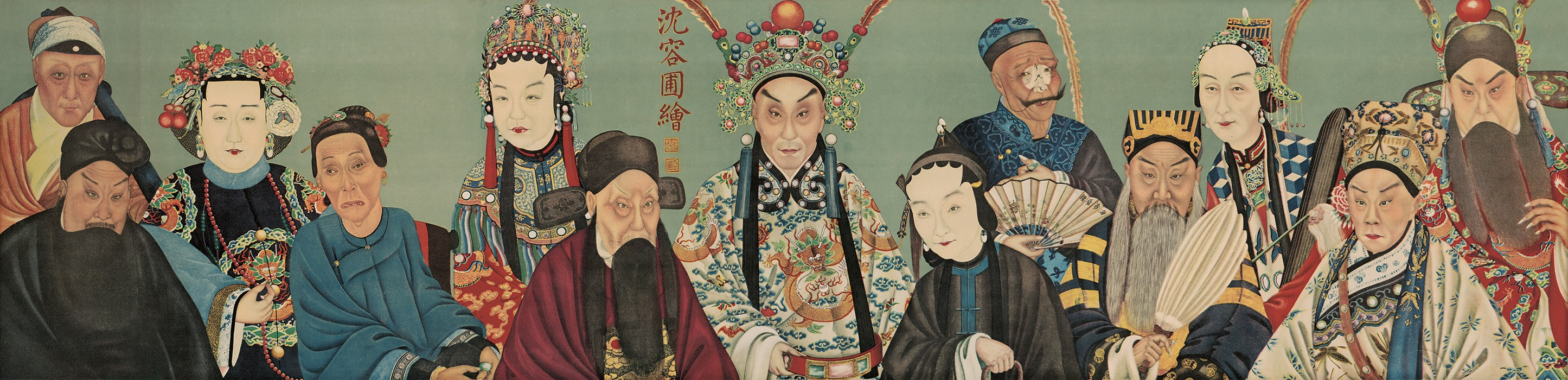
"Thirteen Masters of the Tongzhi and Guangxu Reigns" (同光十三絕), a late Qing dynasty painting by Shen Rongpu (沈容圃). Lu Shengkui is 4th from right, dressed in the role of Zhuge Liang.

== In popular culture ==
Peking opera actor Zhao Chungang (赵纯钢) played Lu Shengkui in the 1994 TV series Big Boss Cheng Changgeng (大老板程長庚).
