= Hou Shuaqiao =

Chinese acrobat and actor

Hou Shuaqiao (Chinese: 侯耍俏; pinyin: Hóu Shuǎqiào, fl. c. 1300–1320), also known as Qian Shuaqiao (Chinese: 欠耍俏; pinyin: Qiàn Shuǎqiào) or possibly Qian Shuaxiao (欠耍削), was a Chinese acrobat and actor who played fujing (副淨, "secondary jing" or "comic-cum-villain") roles in zaju performances. He was based in Khanbaliq (Dadu), the winter capital of the Yuan dynasty. He was best-known for his somersaults, a required skill for playing martial roles in traditional Chinese operas. His somersaults were the highest of all performers.

Hou Shuaqiao was the husband of two zaju performers, Sailianxiu (賽簾秀), and Zhu Jinxiu (朱錦秀). Because Sailianxiu was around two decades older than Zhu Jinxiu, Hou Shuaqiao probably married Zhu Jinxiu after Sailianxiu died.

== In fiction ==
Qian Shuaqiao appears (along with Sailianxiu and Zhu Jinxiu) in Tian Han's 1958 play about the playwright Guan Hanqing.
