= Qinqiang =

Type of Chinese opera

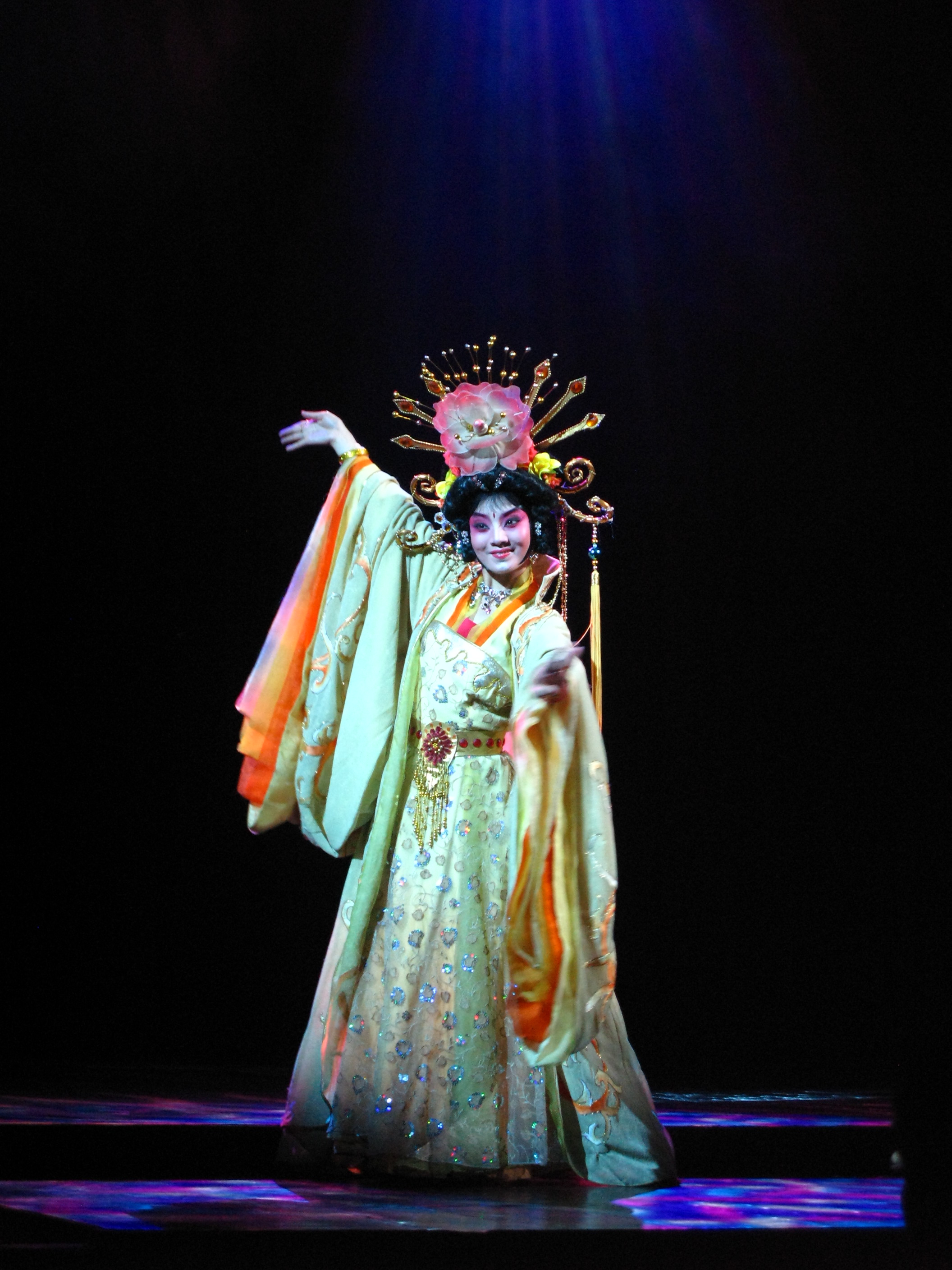

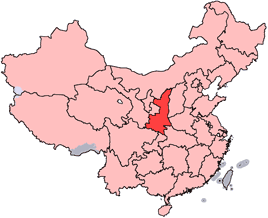
Map showing location of Shaanxi province in China

Qinqiang (Chinese: 秦腔; pinyin: Qín qiāng; lit. 'Qin's tune') is a genre of folk Chinese opera originated in Shaanxi Province of Qing China in 1807 and soon took over other genres to be the representative genre of the province. Historically, there were two separate genres both referring themselves as Qinqiang, the one with a longer history was later renamed as Handiao Erhuang (汉调二簧), while the newer genre is the topic of this article.

The genre features bangzi (wooden clapper) as its accompanying instruments, from which it derives its other names, Bangzi opera and luàntán (亂彈, literally "hit in chaos"). Bangzi tune is considered one of China's Four Great Characteristic Melodies. Qinqiang is the representative of the Bangzi opera and the most important origin of other Bangzi operas. It plays a key role in Chinese traditional culture as its birth and development process is the result of the development of Chinese local opera since ancient times.

== History ==
=== Terminology ===
Qinqiang originated in Shaanxi Province (abbreviated as Qín) of Qing China in 1807 and soon took over other genres to be the representative genre of the province.

Historically, there were two separate genres both referring themselves as Qinqiang, the one with a longer history was later renamed as Handiao Erhuang (汉调二簧). Earlier scholars lumped various genres in Shaanxi Province ("Qin"), including but not restricted to Handiao Erhuang, as Qinqiang; hence, mistakenly they traced such Qinqiang to Qin dynasty (221BC - 206 BC). The epitome of this misconception was Wang Shaoyou (王绍猷)'s infamous claim in 1949 that Qinqiang "formed in Qin dynasty, refined in Han dynasty, developed in Tang dynasty, completed by Yuan dynasty, reached maturity in Ming dynasty, spread across China in Qin dynasty". Wang's theory was soon debunked in the academia by 程砚秋 and 枣文寿, but the local government and newspaper continued to push the outdated theory.

Scholars state that Qinqiang reflects on the personalities and experiences of the working people, as it was impacted by the war and the influence of Western culture and art. It has been researched by people looking to study the historical and cultural connotations of the Qin dynasty and Tan Dun, the composer for the opera The First Emperor, researched Qinqiang for the opera, in order to learn more about "ancient Chinese vocal styles".

== Music style ==
Qinqiang has four forms of performance: singing, narration, dance, and martial arts. During performances the combination of singing and narrative is used to express other scenes and characters, such as general combat or soldiers attacking enemies on the stage. Supporters of Qiniang state that this creates a unique charm and atmosphere. Actors require a foundation of vocal music, as this is how the character of different humanities is expressed.

== Characters ==
There are 13 kinds of characters in Qinqiang including four kinds of "Sheng" (生, male) (老生、須生、小生、幼生), six kinds of "Dan" (旦, female) (老旦、正旦、小旦、花旦、武旦、媒旦), two kinds of "Jing" (淨, painted face male) (大淨、毛淨) and one kind of "Chou" (丑, Clown), also knowns as " 13 Tou Wangzi" (十三頭網子).

== Actors ==
- Wei Changsheng

== Artist ==
Yang Wenying, a famous artist after the founding of the People's Republic of China, and his achievements in the study of Qinqiang Opera art. Yang Wenying is a famous director and actor. He adapted many music works of Qinqiang art to promote the development of modern Qinqiang art in China, such as the modern Qinqiang opera “Red coral”, “Red Lantern”, “Ports” and so on.

== Musical work ==
In 1958, Zhao, Zhenxiao and Lu Rilong, professors of Xi'an Conservatory of Music, created the “Capriccio on a Qinqiang Theme”, which is inspired by Shaanxi Opera, in order to promote the development of national music. The “Capriccio on Qinqiang Theme” is a representative work of the Qingqiang style. This music work is written for Erhu, which is called Chinese violin.
