= Fu Yu (actor) =

Chinese zaju actor of Ming dynasty

Fu Yu (Chinese: 傅瑜; pinyin: Fù Yú) was a Chinese zaju actor of the Ming dynasty, who performed in Nanjing during the second half of the 16th century.

== Career ==
Fu Yu was a member of the Nanjing-based commercial troupe led by the actor Hao Kecheng (郝可成). When he was young, he was "exceedingly beautiful" and rose to fame by playing dan (women) roles. In his 20s, he switched to playing sheng (young male) roles, and after age 40, wai (older male) roles. He became a trainer of the troupe but did not quit the stage. When the theatre critic Pan Zhiheng saw him in his old age, he remarked on the veteran's "dignified" poise and "resounding" voice.

== Children ==
Fu Yu and his wife, née Chen (陳), had a boy named Fu Mao (傅卯) and a girl named Fu Shou (傅壽, courtesy name Lingxiu 靈修). Trained by their father, the siblings began performing as young teens to great acclaim. Fu Shou, who was skilled in both the northern tune (beiqu) of zaju and the southern tune of the young kunqu, was highly popular when she later became a courtesan-actress. Fu Mao possibly played dan roles initially before switching to sheng roles like his father.
