= Magnolia Award =

Magnolia Award may refer to:

- Shanghai Magnolia Award presented by the Shanghai government to foreigners
- Magnolia Television Award, presented during the Shanghai Television Festival
  - Magnolia Award for Best Actress in a Television Series
  - Magnolia Award for Best Actor in a Television Series
  - Magnolia Award for Best Television Series
  - Magnolia Award for Best Television Film or Miniseries
- Magnolia Stage Award or Shanghai Magnolia Stage Performance Award
