= Zhejiang Xiaobaihua Yue Opera Troupe =

Background information
- Also known as: Zhejiang Little Flowers Yue opera Troupe
- Origin: Hangzhou, Zhejiang, China
- Genres: Yue opera
- Years active: 1984–present
- Website: www.zjxbhyjt.com

Chinese name
- Traditional Chinese: 浙江小百花越劇團
- Simplified Chinese: 浙江小百花越剧团
- Literal meaning: Zhejiang Little Hundred-Flower Yue Opera Troupe
- Hanyu Pinyin: Zhèjiāng Xiǎo Bǎihuā Yuèjù Tuán

Zhejiang Xiaobaihua Yue Opera Troupe is a professional all-women Yue opera (i.e. Yue opera) troupe in Hangzhou, Zhejiang, China. Along with Zhejiang Yue Opera Troupe and Shanghai Yueju Troupe, it is one of China's most famous Yue opera troupes. It has toured the U.S., France, Netherlands, Belgium, Japan, South Korea, Singapore, Thailand, Hong Kong, Macao, Taiwan and other places.

Mao Weitao, the current director of the troupe, has tried innovative (and controversial) ways to revive interest in Yue opera, such as adding elements of pop music, modern dance and even musical into the art.

== History ==
=== 1980s: The Golden Age ===
The troupe was formed in 1983 as a special delegation to Hong Kong named the "Zhejiang Yue Opera Hong Kong Xiaobaihua Performance Troupe". Twenty-eight girls with an average age of 18 were chosen from among thousands of hopefuls in Zhejiang, who then studied under older artists — survivors of the Cultural Revolution (1966–1976, when Yue opera performers were viciously attacked for being "decadent artists"). After a year of intense training, the girls debuted in November 1983 in Sunbeam Theatre in front of an enthusiastic Hong Kong audience which included Yue-Kong Pao and Run Run Shaw. Their Hong Kong success led to the establishment of Zhejiang Xiaobaihua Yue Opera Troupe in 1984.

At its inception, Zhejiang Xiaobaihua Yue Opera Troupe focused on developing young stars. Some of the "founding" girls like He Ying (zh:何英), Fang Xuewen (zh:方雪雯), Dong Kedi (zh:董柯娣), He Saifei, and Mao Weitao — collectively known as the "Five Golden Flowers of Yue opera" — became celebrities (especially in the Wu-speaking areas) after the release of the 1984 film Five Daughters Offering Felicitations (五女拜壽), an adaption of the Chinese Yue opera Birthday Celebration by Five Daughters, which won Best Opera Film at the 5th Golden Rooster Awards. Their popularity can be seen from frequent invites to perform on CCTV New Year's Gala, the world's most watched television program:

- On the 1985 Gala, He Saifei and Mao Weitao performed a scene from the movie.
- On the 1988 Gala, He Ying, Fang Xuewen, Dong Kedi, Hong Ying (洪瑛) and Zhou Meijiao (周美姣) sang a short aria together.
- On the 1989 Gala, He Ying (dubbed the "Fairy of Yue opera" by fans) performed a duet with Huangmei opera singer Wu Qiong (吴琼).

Owing to their star power, the 1980s has been called the golden days of Yue opera.

=== 1990s: Decline and explorations ===
The Yue Opera saw a decline in popularity with China's reform and opening-up policy to bring in a lot of imported cultures and entertainment. With more audience shifting to mass entertainment products such as popular music and TV dramas, the market of Yue Opera was struggling for survival, resulting in a big laying out of performers.
