= Song Weiping =

Song Weiping 宋卫平
- Born: 1958 (age 67–68); Shaoxing, Zhejiang, China
- Education: Zhejiang University
- Occupations: Co-founder & President of Greentown China

Song Weiping (simplified Chinese: 宋卫平; traditional Chinese: 宋衛平) is a Chinese real estate tycoon and billionaire. He is the co-founder and president of Greentown China.

== Career ==
Song was born in Sheng County, Shaoxing, Zhejiang province in 1958. 1982, he graduated from the Department of History, Hangzhou University (current Zhejiang University). 1982-1987, he taught in a party school. 1987, he went to Zhuhai, Guangdong, and worked in a computer company as a secretary.

In 1994, Song returned to Hangzhou, he founded Greentown China, a real estate company, with his wife Xia Yibo (夏一波). China Greentown is a leading real estate company in Zhejiang, Shanghai and Beijing. He also founded the football club, Hangzhou Greentown F.C.

According to Hurun Report's 2013 China Rich List, Song and his wife were ranked No. 212 in China with a net worth of US$1.22 billion.
