= Mao Weitao =

Chinese Yue opera actress

Mao Weitao Máo Wēitāo
- Born: August 8, 1962 (age 63); Tongxiang, Zhejiang, China
- Genres: Yue opera
- Years active: 1983–present

Chinese name
- Traditional Chinese: 茅威濤
- Simplified Chinese: 茅威涛

Mao Weitao (born 8 August 1962) is a Chinese Yue opera actress-singer who usually portrays Sheng roles (i.e. male characters). A founding member of the acclaimed Zhejiang Xiaobaihua Yue Opera Troupe who also served as its president from 1999 to 2018, Mao Weitao is a household name among Yue opera listeners. For non-opera listeners, she is best known for her portrayal of Dongfang Bubai in the 2001 TV series Laughing in the Wind.

Mao Weitao is one of only 4 people who have won the Plum Blossom Grand Prize, given to those who continue to be active and innovative in theatre or opera after winning the Plum Blossom Prize twice. She is also the vice-chairperson of China Theatre Association. She was a member of the 7th, 8th, 9th, 10th, and 11th National People's Congress.

For years Mao Weitao has taken steps to "modernize" Yue opera. She has recently secured investment from billionaires Jack Ma and Song Weiping to realize some of her more ambitious plans regarding Yue opera.

== Career ==
From 1999 to 2018 she has been the president of Zhejiang Xiaobaihua Yue Opera Troupe, with which she debuted in 1984.

== Baiyue Cultural Creativity ==
In 2018, Mao Weitao quit her position in the Xiaobaihua Troupe to become chairwoman of Baiyue Cultural Creativity Co., which was registered in 2016 with the investment of Zhejiang billionaires Jack Ma and Song Weiping. The company seeks to provide services on theatre administration, play production, international collaboration, art education, theatre talent agency, as well as theatre investment, etc.

One of Baiyue's first projects was the construction of China Yue Theatre (中国越·剧场) in Hangzhou in 2018, whose state-of-art, butterfly-shaped complex was designed by C. Y. Lee.

== Opera roles ==
English title	Original title	Role	Notes
Dream of the Red Chamber	紅樓夢	Jia Baoyu	
He Wenxiu	何文秀	He Wenxiu	
Five Daughters Offering Felicitations	五女拜壽	Zou Shilong	made into a 1984 film
Tang Bohu Fails the Imperial Examination	唐伯虎落第	Tang Bohu	made into a 1988 film
Peacock Flies Southeast	孔雀東南飛	Jiao Zhongqing	
Butterfly Lovers	梁山伯與祝英台	Liang Shanbo	made into a 2013 film
Romance of the Western Chamber	西廂記	Zhang Junrui	made into a 2010 film
Rouge	胭脂	Wu Nandai	
The Peach Blossom Fan	桃花扇	Hou Fangyu	
Lu You and Tang Wan	陸游與唐婉	Lu You	made into a 1989 film
The Desert Prince	沙漠王子	Luolan	
Sorrows in the Han Palace	漢宮怨	Emperor Xuan of Han	
Cold Friendship	寒情	Jing Ke	
Kong Yiji	孔乙己	Kong Yiji	made into a 1998 TV series
The Tale of Ancient Book Collector	藏書之家	Fan Rong	
The Moon's Reflection on the Second Spring	二泉映月	Abing	
The Good Person of Jiangnan	江南好人	Shen Dai; Sui Da	
Coriolanus and Du Liniang	寇流蘭與杜麗娘	Coriolanus	
Chunhyangjeon	春香傳	Yi Monglong	
Li Qingzhao	李清照	Zhao Mingcheng	made into a 2010 TV series
