= Ho Yi =

Chinese actor, theatre director and playwright (born 1956)

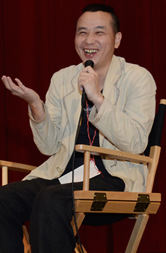
- Ho at the 2014 Awareness Film Festival
- Born: 1956 (age 69–70); Hong Kong
- Occupations: Actor; director; producer; playwright
- Years active: 1979–present
- Spouse: Vivian Chow
- Children: 1
- Relatives: Zhou Xinfang (father-in-law); Tsai Chin (sister-in-law); Adelle Lutz (sister-in-law); Tina Chow (sister-in-law); Michael Chow (brother-in-law); China Chow (niece)

Chinese name
- Traditional Chinese: 黃浩義
- Simplified Chinese: 黄浩义
Transcriptions
Standard Mandarin
- Hanyu Pinyin: Huáng Hào Yì
Yue: Cantonese
- Jyutping: Wong^{4} Hou^{6} Ji^{6}

Wong Ho-yi (Chinese: 黃浩義; Jyutping: Wong^{4} Hou^{6} Ji^{6}), credited in English-language productions as Ho Yi (浩義), is a Hong Kong actor, stage and film director, playwright, and theatre producer.

== Early years ==
Ho Yi was born educated in Hong Kong. His development as an actor/director coincided with the boom of the Hong Kong "City Hall Culture", a "renaissance" period of the former Urban Council, Hong Kong.

Ho Yi's professional acting career began when the Hong Kong Repertory Theatre (香港話劇團), a government subsidized company prepared itself to establish in 1977, Ho Yi became one of its earliest freelance actors. His first full-time acting job was with RTHK (香港電台) where he worked for three years.

== Career in Hong Kong ==
In 1983, Ho Yi founded Spotlight Productions (浩采製作) in Hong Kong and the Hong Kong Youth Theatre Company (香港青年劇團), mainly to do theatrical stage work. Between 1983 and 1997, with his two independent theatre companies, he wrote/translated, produced, directed and starred in a score of stage productions, including two musicals – of which his Pa Pa Can You Hear Me Sing (搭錯車) was with the collaboration of the late David Toguri (Rocky Horror Picture Show and Who Framed Roger Rabbit) as his choreographer. He also worked with the Hong Kong Philharmonic Orchestra in three seasons.

His signature play American Buffalo (勾心鬥角), first staged in 1986, became known as a theatrical milestone of Hong Kong as written up by "Film Bi-weekly" (電影雙周). Ho Yi's unique and original treatment in the delivery of the rich David Mamet dialogue in Cantonese (Cantonese is now officially recognised as a language) created a new form of acting style known as Wu Li Tou (無里頭) for the Hong Kong stage.

Ho Yi's career as a cross-genre actor, on both stage and screen, extended further afield in the early 1990s. As early as 1992, he produced, directed and acted in China. The following year he broke new grounds in Shanghai, by staging the American play Extremities (以牙還牙) in Mandarin.

He made his English-language acting debut in British television series Soldier, Soldier while still in Hong Kong, followed by a principal role in the film Victory (Wang) directed by Oscar-winner Mark Peploe (co-screenwriter of the Last Emperor), starring opposite Hollywood heavyweights Willem Dafoe and Sam Neill, in 1994.

Hong Kong Economic Journal's Hung Hg called him the "Hong Kong's father of the theatre".

== Filmmaking in Hong Kong ==
Ho Yi made his feature film directing debut with Thunderstorm (雷雨), for which he also wrote the screenplay and played the leading role, in 1995.

Red Passage ("紅色的迴廊")is Ho Yi's second narrative feature film as a director for which he wrote the screenplay in 2005. It took eight years before shooting began in July 2013. Red Passage is also produced by Ho Yi. It is based on his own story set in 1970/71 and filmed entirely in Hong Kong, in Cantonese. Red Passage had its world premiere at Palm Beach International Film Festival, on 6 April 2014. According to Tim Wassberg's review for Sirk TV of Inside Reel, the film "shows the intersection of both plot and emotion on a human scale [...] this movie from the perspective of the life of one who experienced it can be so compelling [...] It shows the conflict but also, within the character, his revelation."

On 13 September 2014, Red Passage was screened at the Awareness Film Festival in Los Angeles, where it won a Jury Award. On the same day, in the United States, Red Passage was also screened at the Reel Hope Film Festival in Indianapolis. On 24 October 2014, Red Passage premiered in Hong Kong, at the Hong Kong Asian Film Festival.

In May 2015, Red Passage was selected by the Garifuna International Film Festival. The film was awarded a "Best Foreign Language Film Award" as well as an appreciation certificate from the City of Los Angeles for "tremendous dedication to the preservation of indigenous culture bringing awareness through films" to Ho Yi personally.

== United Kingdom works ==
After arriving in the United Kingdom, Ho Yi has appeared opposite Brad Pitt in Spy Game (Prison Warden) and Pierce Brosnan in the Bond movie Die Another Day (Mr. Chang). While residing in the United Kingdom, he also appeared in the TV series Thief Takers and a feature film The Secret Laughter of Women with Colin Firth.

In May 2000, Ho Yi appeared, for an entire first run term, in a London's West End production of the Rodgers and Hammerstein musical The King & I, with Elaine Paige. British critic Sheridan Morley reviewed in The Spectator and the British Teletext describing Ho Yi as the "Male Star of the Night" for his opening night's performance of The Kralahome.

== Works in Shanghai, China ==
Upon arrival in Shanghai, he appeared in Chinese film Clay fear (陶器人形). For the stage, he directed An Inspector Calls (疑雲陣陣), A Doll's House ("玩偶之家" or "傀儡家庭"), Agent Penny and A Woman's Monologue of the Classics (經典戲劇女獨白) in Shanghai.

Ho Yi was Dean (Professor) of the Academy of Performing Arts of the Shanghai Institute of Film Arts (上海電影藝術學院之演藝學院) for its first year (2004/2005). In summer 2009, Ho Yi published his 32-episode television screenplay Zhou Xinfang (周信芳傳奇之"戲子佳人") in Hong Kong.

== Personal life ==
Ho Yi is married to Vivian Chow (daughter of Peking opera actor Zhou Xinfang), with whom he has one son, Dashiell Edmund Wong.

== Major acting credits ==
=== Theatre ===
Year	Stage play	Presenter/Producer	Production language
1980	As Mercutio in Romeo and Juliet	A Hong Kong Repertory Theatre production presented by the Urban Council, Hong Kong	Cantonese
	As Hu Si (胡四) in Sunrise (日出)	A Hong Kong Repertory Theatre production presented by the Urban Council, Hong Kong	Cantonese
1981	As Morton Kiil, the Badger in An Enemy of the People	A Hong Kong Repertory Theatre Production presented by the Urban Council, Hong Kong	Cantonese
	Guest appearance in Whose Life is it Anyway?	A Hong Kong Repertory Theatre production presented by the Urban Council, Hong Kong	Cantonese
1982	As Lucentio in Taming of the Shrew	A Hong Kong Repertory Theatre production presented by the Urban Council, Hong Kong	Cantonese
	Ensemble lead in Side Door	A Hong Kong Repertory Theatre production presented by the Urban Council, Hong Kong	Cantonese
	As Constantine Treplef in The Seagull	A Hong Kong Repertory Theatre production presented by the Urban Council, Hong Kong	Cantonese
	As the Narrator in Musical Fantasticks	A Seals Theatre production presented by the Tsuen Wan Town Hall	Cantonese
1983	As Edmund in King Lear	A Seals Theatre Company production presented by the Urban Council, Hong Kong	Cantonese
	As Eben in Desire Under the Elms	A Spotlight Productions production presented by the Hong Kong Arts Centre	Cantonese
1984	As Wu Song/Xi Men Qing (武松／西門慶) in Pan Jin Lian(潘金蓮)	A Spotlight Productions production presented by the Hong Kong Arts Centre	Cantonese
1985	Solo Recital in Hong Kong Philharmonic Orchestra – A Midsummer Night's Dream	A Hong Kong Philharmonic Orchestra production presented by the Tuen Mun Town Hall	Cantonese
1986	As Teach in American Buffalo	A Spotlight Productions production presented by the Hong Kong Arts Centre	Cantonese
	As Chen Xuan Ji (陳玄機) in Return of the Sword (還劍奇情錄)	A Hong Kong Youth Theatre Company production presented by the Tsuen Wan Town Hall	Cantonese
	As Teach in American Buffalo (Second Run)	A Spotlight Productions production presented by the Hong Kong Arts Centre	Cantonese
	As Antonio Salieri in Hong Kong Philharmonic Orchestra Salutes Amadeus	A Hong Kong Philharmonic Orchestra production presented by the Urban Council, Hong Kong	Cantonese
	As Teach in American Buffalo (Third Run)	A Spotlight Productions production presented by the Hong Kong Arts Centre	Cantonese
	As Joe in Extremities	A Spotlight Productions production presented by the Hong Kong Arts Centre	Cantonese
1987	As Joe in Extremities (Second Run)	A Spotlight Productions production presented by the Hong Kong Arts Centre	Cantonese
	As Teach in American Buffalo (Forth Run)	A Spotlight Productions production presented by the Hong Kong Arts Centre	Cantonese
	As Len in Saved	A Spotlight Productions production presented by the Hong Kong Arts Centre	Cantonese
	As Coriolanus in Coriolanus	A Spotlight Productions production presented by the Hong Kong Arts Centre	Cantonese
	As Nat in I'm Not Rappaport	A Spotlight Productions production presented by the Hong Kong Arts Centre	Cantonese
	As Teach in American Buffalo (Fifth Run)	A Spotlight Productions independent production	Cantonese
1988	As Joe in Extremities (Third Run)	A Spotlight Productions independent production	Cantonese
	As Nat in I'm Not Rappaport (Second Run)	A Spotlight Productions independent production	Cantonese
	As Teach in American Buffalo (Sixth Run)	A Spotlight Productions independent production	Cantonese
	As Cliff in the Woolgatherer	A Spotlight Productions independent production	Cantonese
1989	Guest appearance as one of the thugs in Saved	A Hong Kong Youth Theatre Production presented by the Urban Council, Hong Kong	Cantonese
	As Joe in Extremities (Fourth Run)	A Spotlight Productions independent production	Cantonese
	As Giuseppe Verdi in Hong Kong Philharmonic Orchestra – Opera Extravaganza	A Hong Kong Philharmonic Orchestra production presented by the Urban Council, Hong Kong	Cantonese
1990	As Teach in American Buffalo (Seventh Run)	A Spotlight Productions independent production	Cantonese
1991	As Teach in American Buffalo (Eighth Run)	A Spotlight Productions independent production	Cantonese
	As George in Same Time, Next Year	A Spotlight Productions independent production	Cantonese
	As Joe in Extremities (Fifth Run)	A Spotlight Productions independent production	Cantonese
	As Charlie Baker in the Foreigner	A Spotlight Productions production presented by the Urban Council, Hong Kong	Cantonese
1992	As the Vicomte de Valmont in Les Liaisons Dangereuses	A Spotlight Productions production presented by the Urban Council, Hong Kong	Cantonese
1993	As Charlie Baker in The Foreigner (Second Run)	A Spotlight Productions independent production	Cantonese
	As Teach in American Buffalo (Ninth Run)	A Spotlight Productions independent production	Cantonese
	As Teach in American Buffalo (Tenth Run)	A Spotlight Productions independent production	Cantonese
	As Roma in Glengarry Glen Ross	A Spotlight Productions production presented by the Urban Council, Hong Kong	Cantonese
1994	As Teach in American Buffalo (Eleventh Run)	A Spotlight Productions independent production	Cantonese
1995	As Roy in Waterloo Bridge	A Spotlight Productions production presented by the Urban Council, Hong Kong	Cantonese
2000–2001	As the Kralahome in the musical The King and I directed by Christopher Renshaw	at the London Palladium	English

=== Film ===
Year	Film	Producers/Distributors	Language
1985	As the Decorator (师傅仔) in My Name Ain’t Suzie (花街时代) directed by Angela Chan	A Hong Kong Shaw Brothers Studio production	Cantonese
1984	As Teacher Chen in Growing Up in Anger (青春怒潮) directed by Clifford Choi	A Hong Kong Independent film	Cantonese
1993	As Mr. Hong Kong in Mr. Hong Kong Lost in China (香港少爺) directed by Zhang Gang	A People's Republic of China independent film	Mandarin
1993	As the Union Leader (工會領袖) in Lord of East China Sea (上海皇帝) directed by Man-Kit Poon	A Hong Kong independent film	Cantonese
1994	As the Volleyball Coach (排球教練) in "Victory (青春火花)" directed by Andy Wing-Keung Chin	A Hong Kong independent film	Cantonese
1996	As Wang in Victory (1996 film) directed by Mark Peploe	Bob Weinstein and Harvey Weinstein, France, Germany, United Kingdom	English
1995	As Zhou Pu Yuan (周樸園) in Thunderstorm (雷雨) directed by Ho Yi	A Hong Kong independent film	Cantonese
1999	As Chen in the Secret Laughter of Women directed by Peter Schwabach	A HandMade Films and Paragon Entertainment production, United Kingdom, Canada	English
2001	As the Prison Warden in Spy Game directed by Tony Scott	Douglas Wick, Marc Abraham, Beacon Pictures, Universal Pictures	English
2002	As Mr. Chang in 007 – Die Another Day directed by Lee Tamahori	Michael G Wilson and Barbara Broccoli, Eon Productions, Metro-Goldwyn-Mayer, 20th Century Fox	English
2005	As the Mad Man in Clay Fear (陶器人形) directed by Zhang Jiabei	A Shanghai Film Studio production	Mandarin
2014	As Teacher Mo in Red Passage directed by Ho Yi	Ho Yi and Emmanuel Itier	Cantonese

=== Television ===
Year	Television	Television company/Network	Language
1982	As the First Person/Narrator (第一人稱敘述人) in the Friends episode of the Friends & Places (香港，香港之 "三人行" ) series	Radio Television Hong Kong	Cantonese
	As the Social Worker in Neon Bird (霓虹鳥) episode of the Profile (溫馨集) series	Radio Television Hong Kong	Cantonese
	As Emperor Xian Feng (咸豐皇帝) in The Young Dowager (少女慈禧) series	Asia Television, Hong Kong	Cantonese
1986	As Wan Xi Liang (萬喜良) in The Rise of the Great Wall (秦始皇) series	Asia Television Limited, Hong Kong	Cantonese
1992	As Kwong in Lifelines episode of series 2 of the Soldier Soldier series	Central Independent Television, United Kingdom	English
1997	As the Pattern Buyer in Fashion Victims episode of series 3 of the Thief Takers	Carlton Television, United Kingdom	English

== Awards ==
Year	Name of Award	Awarding Festival / Institution	Country / Territory
2014	Jury Award	Awareness Film Festival, Los Angeles	United States of America
2015	Best Foreign Language Award	Garifuna International Film Festival, Los Angeles	United States of America
2015	City of Los Angeles Appreciation Certificate	Garifuna International Film Festival, Los Angeles	United States of America
