= Zhang Junqiu =

Peking Opera actor

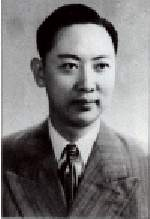
- Chinese: 张君秋
Transcriptions
Standard Mandarin
- Hanyu Pinyin: Zhāng Jūnqiū
- Wade–Giles: Chang Chün-ch’iu

Zhang Junqiu (Note: Zhāng Jūnqiū, 张君秋) (October 14, 1920 – May 27, 1997) was a singer of Peking Opera. He played a female, or dan role. His hometown was Dantu, Jiangsu, and he was born in Beijing. His vocal style is called "Zhang pai." It became popular in the 1970s and it is now the most widespread genre of Peking Opera. He was once one of the "four small famous dans." (Note: Sì xiǎo míng dàn, 四小名旦) He is far better remembered than the other three.

Zhang's family was poor. His mother was a star in the opera of Hubei Province. She encouraged him to study Peking Opera. When Zhang was 13, Li Lingfeng (Note: Lǐ Língfēng, 李凌枫) adopted him as an apprentice. Recognizing Zhang's talent, Li later sent him to Wang Yaoqing, an opera star and Li's teacher. Zhang first appeared on the stage in 1935. In 1937, Zhang became an apprentice of Mei Lanfang, the best-known Chinese opera star of the time.

In 1942, Zhang created his own troupe. In 1943, he met Wu Lizhen. (Note: Wú Lìzhēn, 吴励箴) Although Zhang was already married to Zhao Yurong, (Note: Zhào Yùróng, 赵玉蓉) the two fell in love at first sight. Even though Zhang was successful in his career, Wu's relatives looked down him as an actor. Wu herself acted resolutely, packed her bags, and moved from Shanghai to live with Zhang in Beijing.

== Rise to celebrity ==
With the Chinese Civil War raging, Zhang fled to Hong Kong in 1948. When the war was over, Mao Zedong's Communists ruled from Beijing and the KMT was exiled to Taiwan. Zhang returned to the mainland in 1950 to join the Wuhan Peking Opera Troupe.

His 1962 show with martial artist Gao Shenglin (Note: Gāo Shènglín, 高盛麟) was a sensation that played to packed audiences. The two performers were equally renowned and were both at the height of their powers. There was stormy applause after every performance and the curtain had to be called each time. In a state that discouraged celebrity, Zhang was a top celebrity.

== Cultural Revolution ==
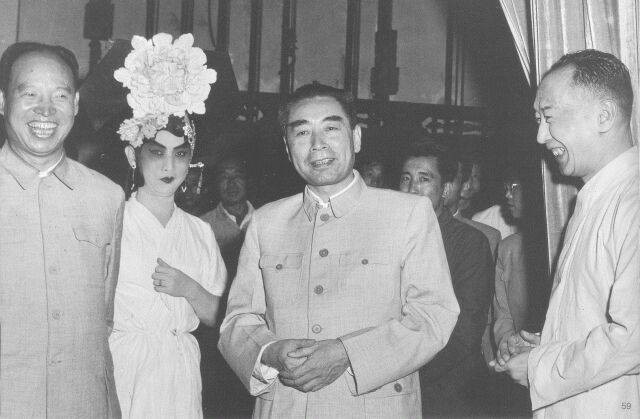
From left to right, Peng Zhen, Zhang Junqiu, and Zhou Enlai in 1956.

During the Cultural Revolution of 1966–1976, traditional forms of entertainment were banned. Jiang Qing, Mao's wife, denounced cross dressing. Premier Zhou Enlai told Zhang to stop performing female roles. Zhang promised Zhou to stop training boys to be female impersonators.

Men dressing as women for Peking Opera and women dressing as men for Yue Opera was a major feature of Chinese culture at this time. Mao is not known to have made any pronouncements on cross dressing. Jiang was concerned primarily with women dressing as men. So the ban on female impersonation is likely to have been Zhou's initiative. Zhou himself, known for his good looks, had played numerous female roles with the drama club of Nankai Middle School, his all-boys high school. Young female impersonators were often involved in abusive relationships, and Zhou may have been compensating for his own past, according to Bao Huai, a gender studies researcher.

On June 4, 1966, Zhang and Ma Lianlang (Note: Mǎ Liánliáng, 马连良) performed the modern opera More Every Year (Note: Nián nián yǒuyú,《年年有余》.) at a school in Beijing. The opera was broadcast on Central People's Radio. Zhang played a peasant woman. Just before the performance, Ma heard the news that Zhou Xinfang (Note: Zhōu Xìnfāng, 周信芳) had been denounced as a counterrevolutionary. Ma was concerned because he had starred in Hai Rui Dismissed from Office, a play denounced by the Maoists. During the performance, his anxiety was evident to the audience. Zhang did not perform again until February 8, 1979.

== Later life ==
Wu left Zhang in 1969. Zhao died soon afterward. In 1974, Zhang married Xie Hongwen, (Note: Xiè Hóngwén, 谢虹雯.) a student of opera star Mei Lanfang. She was ten years younger than Zhang.

In the mid-1980s, Zhang was teaching at the National Academy of Theatre Arts. He participated in a project of the Tianjin Chinese Cultural Promotion Council (Note: Tiānjiàn Zhōnghuá Wénhuà Cùjìnhuì, 天健中华文化促进会.) to have young actors dress as the old masters and lip synch to their recordings. Videos of 355 plays were created this way. Zhang also served an art adviser.

Zhang's children are Zhang Xuejin, (Note: Zhāng Xuéjīn, 张学津.) Zhang Xuehai, (Note: Zhāng Xuéhǎi, 张学海..) Zhang Xuehao, (Note: Zhāng Xuéhào, 张学浩.) and Zhang Xuemin. (Note: Zhāng Xuémǐn, 张学敏.) Most of them are successful Peking Opera performers.
