= Chen Lijun (actress) =

Chinese Yue opera actress

- 陈丽君
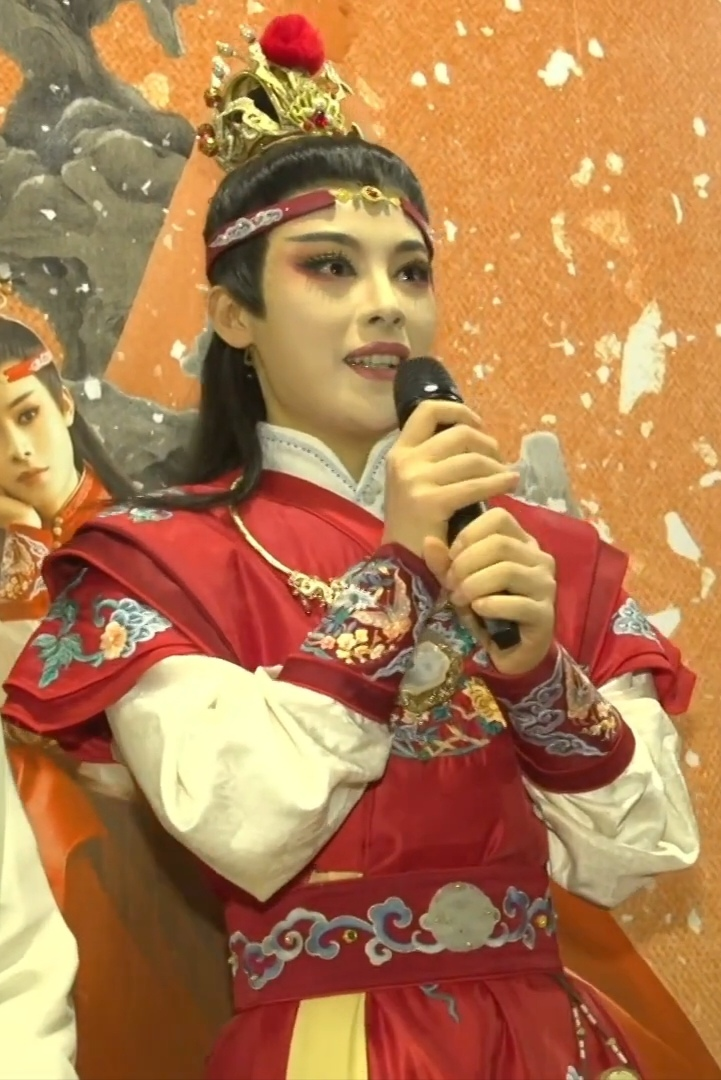
- Chen as Jia Baoyu, 2026
- Born: May 9, 1992 (age 34); Shengzhou, Zhejiang Province, China
- Education: Zhejiang Vocational Academy of Art; Shengzhou Yue Opera Art School
- Occupation: Yue Opera Actress
- Years active: 2018–present

Chinese name
- Traditional Chinese: 陳麗君
- Simplified Chinese: 陈丽君
Transcriptions
Standard Mandarin
- Hanyu Pinyin: Chén Lìjūn

Chen Lijun (Chinese: 陈丽君; born May 9, 1992) is a Chinese Yue opera actress specializing in the Xiaosheng role type.

== Biography ==
Chen Lijun was born on May 9, 1992 in Shengzhou, Zhejiang Province, and was exposed to Yue opera from a young age. She attended the Shengzhou Yue Opera Art School, specializing in the huadan (young female) role type. After graduation, she was admitted to the Xiaobaihua class in 2008, focusing on the Xiaosheng (young male) role type. She starred in a lead role in New Dragon Gate Inn from 2023 to 2024, an opera adapted from the wuxia film of the same name, and gained popularity for her participation in the fifth season of Sisters Who Make Waves.

== Acting credits ==
=== Yue opera performance ===
Year	Original title	English Title	Role	Notes/Ref.
2019	何文秀	He Wenxiu	He Wenxiu	
2020	五女拜寿	Birthday Celebration by Five Daughters	Zou Shilong	
2023-2024	新龙门客栈	New Dragon Gate Inn	Jia Ting	
2024	梁祝	The Butterfly Lovers	Liang Shanbo	
2024	天下客栈	The World Inn	Jiao Zhongqing	
2024	新龙门客栈之江湖一梦	New Dragon Gate Inn: A Dream of the Jianghu	Jia Ting	
2025	我的大观园	My Grand View Garden	Jia Baoyu	

=== Film ===
Year	Original name	English name	Role	Notes/Ref.
2023	汉文皇后	The Han Empress	Dou Guangping	
2024	新龙门客栈（舞台纪录电影·越剧）	New Dragon Gate Inn（Stage Documentary Film: Yue Opera）	Jia Ting	
2026	鏢人：風起大漠	Blades of the Guardians	Ayuya	

=== TV shows ===
Year	Original name	English name	Platform/Programme
2018	刚好遇见你	Just Met You	Hunan TV Spring Festival Gala
2024	游山恋	Mountain Romance	Dragon TV Spring Festival Gala
2024	梁祝	The Butterfly Lovers	CCTV Lantern Festival Gala (perform with Isabelle Huang)
2024	沧海一声笑	A Sound of Laughter in the Vast Sea	"I Want to Sing with You" (perform with Han Hong)
2024	天命	Destiny	Sisters Who Make Waves (season 5)
2024	凤求凰	Phoenix Seeking His Mate	Singing With Legends (season 6)
2024	一骑红尘	Ride Through the Mundane World	2024 Mid-Autumn Magic Show
2024	君是山	You the Mountain	2024 CMG Mid-Autumn Festival Gala（Duet with Dai quan)
2025	借伞(小品)	Borrow the Umbrella	CCTVSpringFestivalGala
2025	我的大观园(创意剧空间)	My Grand View Garden	2025 Chinese New Year Opera Gala
2025	我的大观园·谁是知心人	My Grand View Garden (part)	Zhejiang STV Official Channel
2025	大圣新章	Great Sage New Chapter	2025 Hunan TV Lantern Festival Gala
2025	花田错	Mistake in the Flower Fields	Mango TV Official Channel
2025	浮生一白	White Snake 3: Fu Sheng	Zhejiang STV Official Channel

=== Single ===
Date	Original name	English name	Notes/Ref.
23 July 2024	浮生一白	White Snake 3: Fu Sheng	White Snake 3 OST（Duet with Chen Haoyu)
13 September 2024	赴	To go	debut single
29 September 2024	挚爱	My True Love	Youth Tribute Song for the 75th Anniversary of the Founding of the People's Republic of China（Duet with Hu Xia
31 October 2024	传越	spreading the Yue	2024 Opening Ceremony of Shengzhou Village Yue Opera Competition
6 November 2024	望月	Gazing at the Moon	Performance Song for Moncler Fashion Show
24 December 2024	大梦歌	Song of the Grand Dream	The ending theme song of the TV series 'Along the River During the Qingming Festival".
26 January 2025	一梦浮生	Fleeting dream of life	Henan TV Spring Festival Gala".
23 July 2025	桂枝香·金陵怀古	N/A	The ending theme song of the movie "stage".
13 September 2025	同行	Together	The theme song of the Gala "The 2nd Golden Panda Awards".
28 September 2025	戏	Drama	2025 Greater Bay Area Film and Music Gala.

=== Others ===
Year/Date	Original name	English name	Notes/Ref.
10 October 2024	中法传统文化交流大使	Traditional Cultural Exchange Ambassador between China and France"	
22 December 2024	首届“电影中国”戏曲电影大展：最佳男主角	1st 'Cinema China' Chinese Opera Film Festival: Best Actor	
1 January 2025	2024年度女性新闻人物	2024 Female News Figure of the Year	
21 February 2025	2024有影响力的《中国妇女》时代人物	2024 Female News Figure of the Year	
28 April 2025	第十三届“浙江青年五四奖章”	Zhejiang Youth May Fourth Medal	
1 May 2025	2025年度中国青年五四奖章	2025 China Youth May Fourth Medal	
20 September 2025	第八届浙江国际青年电影周光影大使	Light and Shadow Ambassador of the 8th Zhejiang International Youth Film Week	
