= Zhao Yanxia =

Chinese opera singer (1928–2025)

Zhao Yanxia (Chinese: 赵燕侠; March 1, 1928 – March 19, 2025) was a Chinese opera singer, known for her performances with the National Peking Opera Company.

== Life and career ==
Zhao Yanxia was born in 1928 in Shenjiatai town, within the Chinese city of Linghai.

Under the direction of her father, Zhao Xiaolou, who was a famous actor, Zhao Yanxia began learning Beijing opera at age 8. Her grandfather and eight of her aunts were also Peking opera performers. She began training for her own opera career at age 7 or 8, in 1935, and began performing in lead roles around age 16.

In the 1950s, Zhao was targeted with criticism of her allegedly "erotic" performances. Then, alongside other actors, she was not allowed to perform from 1966 to 1977 due to China's Cultural Revolution. During that period, she spent five years working on a reform farm, planting wheat.

However, by the 1980s, she was back onstage and had become "China's leading female opera star," according to The New York Times. She performed in China and abroad with the first troupe of the National Peking Opera Company. In 1980, she led a three-month tour to 10 cities in the United States from late August to early November alongside director Zhang Menggeng.

In the early 1980s, Zhao took a pioneering role in reforming China's theatrical management system. In March 1981, she established a restructured opera troupe of 71 members from the original 170-member First Troupe of the Beijing Opera Theatre of Beijing. This new system, sometimes called a "production responsibility system," moved away from the fixed salary model where performers were paid regardless of how often they performed. Her reformed troupe gave 340 performances across China in a 16-month period, far more than was typical under the previous system. As an actress, she portrayed a wide variety of roles, some of which she originated.

Zhao retired from the stage in 1996. She died in Beijing on March 19, 2025, at the age of 97.
