= Greentown China =

Chinese property development company

Greentown China Holdings Limited 绿城中国控股有限公司
- Type: Public
- Traded as: SEHK: 3900
- Industry: Real estate
- Founded: 1995
- Founder: Mr. Song Weiping
- Headquarters: Hangzhou, Zhejiang, People's Republic of China
- Area served: People's Republic of China
- Key people: Chairman: Mr. Song Weiping
- Subsidiaries: Greentown Management Holdings Company Limited
- Website: www.chinagreentown.com

Greentown China Holdings Limited, headquartered in Hangzhou, Zhejiang, is one of the leading privately held residential property developers in China and the largest property developer in Zhejiang Province. It does not only focus on its home market of Hangzhou, but also has operations in Shanghai, Beijing, Changsha and other select cities.

It is a subsidiary of China Communications Construction Group (CCCG).

== History ==
Greentown China was founded in 1995 in Hangzhou. It was listed on the Hong Kong Stock Exchange in July 2006 with the IPO price of HK$8.22 per share.
