= Jingju Theater Company of Beijing =

Theater company based in Beijing, China

- Traditional Chinese: 北京京劇院
- Simplified Chinese: 北京京剧院
- Hanyu Pinyin: Běijīng Jīngjù Yuàn
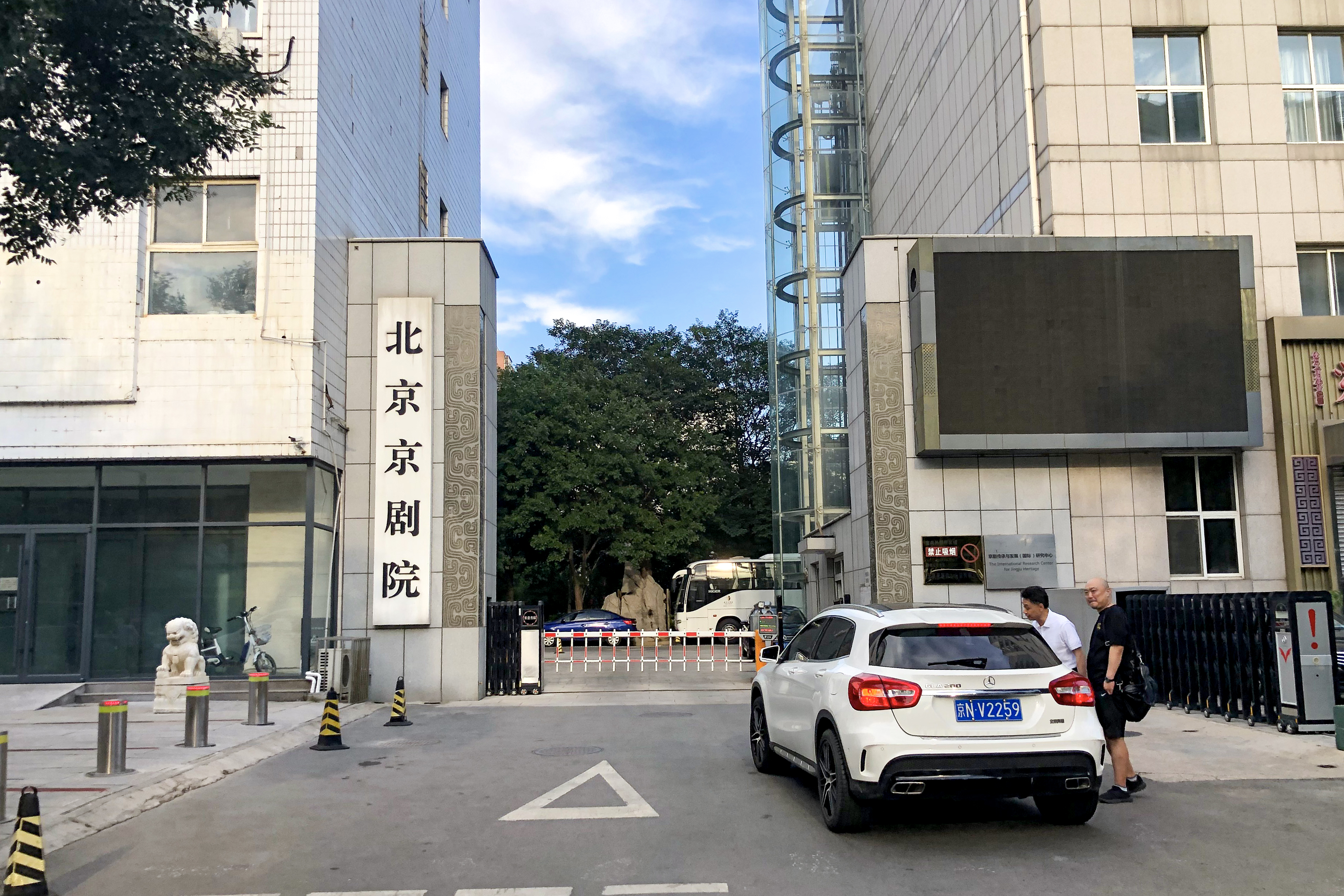
- Formation: 1979
- Type: Theatre group
- Purpose: Peking opera
- Location: Beijing, China
- Website: www.bjo.com.cn

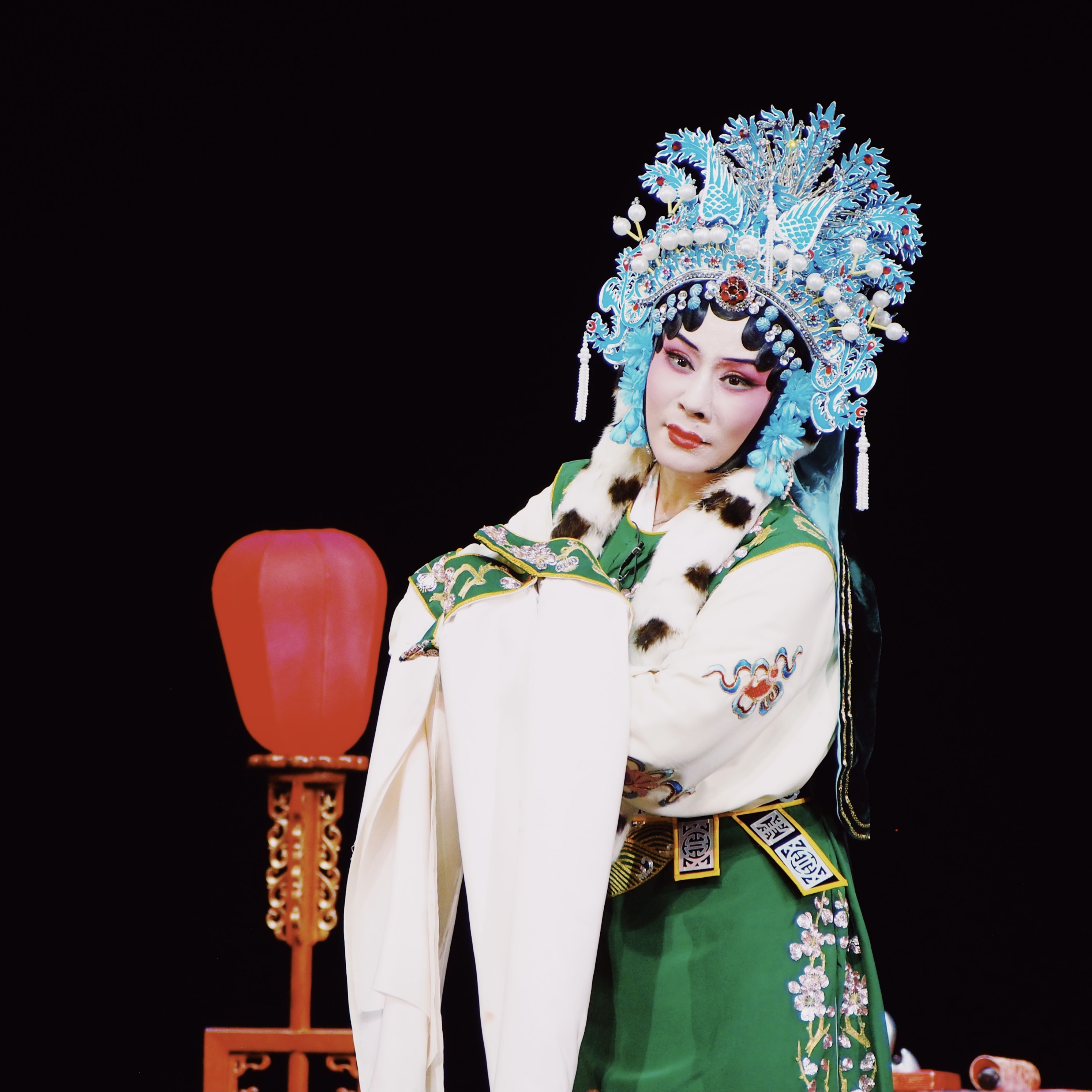
Chi Xiaoqiu, one of the company's stars, playing Cai Yan in 2019.

The Jingju Theater Company of Beijing, formerly known as the Peking Opera Theater Company of Beijing, also known as the Beijing Peking Opera Company, is a theater company based in Beijing, and the largest jingju (Peking opera) performing group in China. Its main venue is the Chang'an Grand Theater, and productions are often aired nationally on CCTV-11. Unestablished performers also hone their skills in smaller theaters.

In 2021, the company has 462 regular employees.

== History ==
The current company was founded in 1979, but its direct predecessor, the Peking Opera Theater Troupe of Beijing (simplified Chinese: 北京京剧团; traditional Chinese: 北京京劇團; pinyin: Běijīng Jīngjù Tuán), was founded in 1955. The troupe's staging of Hai Rui Dismissed from Office is often considered as a catalyst for the start of the Cultural Revolution.

The company's box-office gross per performance remained below ¥20,000 before 2010. After Li Enjie (李恩杰) took over, many market-oriented strategies have been implemented, such as contests, with the goal of cultivating more stars that appeal to the younger base. Shows staged in smaller theaters, such as those directed by the 1985-born Li Zhuoqun (李卓群), have also been successful among younger people. Revenues have been improving. In both 2017 and 2018, total gross revenue was reportedly close to ¥40 million. In early 2019, several shows grossed ¥200,000 per performance.

== External site ==
- Official website
