= Shanghai Jingju Theatre Company =

Theatre company in Shanghai, China

- Traditional Chinese: 上海京劇院
- Simplified Chinese: 上海京剧院
- Hanyu Pinyin: Shànghǎi Jīngjù Yuàn
- Formation: 1955
- Type: Theatre group
- Location: Shanghai, China
- Website: www.pekingopera.sh.cn

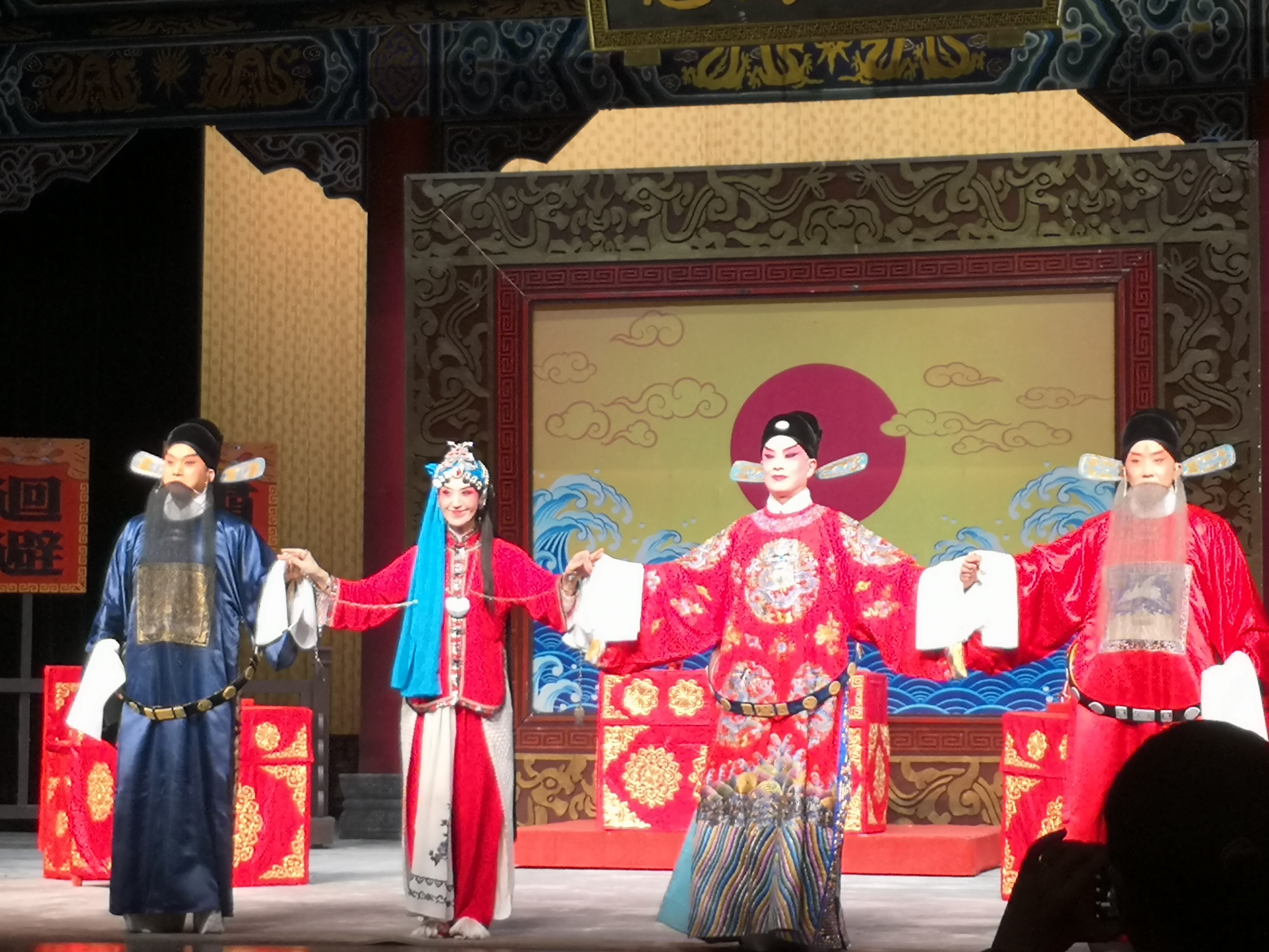
Yu Tang Chun starring Shi Yihong, Shanghai, 4 May 2019.

Shanghai Jingju Theatre Company is a theatre company based in Shanghai, China, which produces Jingju (i.e. Peking Opera). It was founded in 1955, with Zhou Xinfang its director. The Shanghai Beijing-Opera Theatre is at 168 Yueyang Road, Xuhui, Shanghai.

Although the Yue opera as performed at the Shanghai Yueju Yuan is geographically nearer to Shanghai, Peking Opera has long had a following in Shanghai, just as southern opera styles have a following in northern China.

Other famous jingju troupes include the China National Peking Opera Company in Beijing, the Beijing Jingju Yuan (北京京剧院), the Shanghai Youth Jing-Kun Troupe (上海青年京崑劇團), Shenyang Jingju Yuan (沈阳京剧院), Fujian Jingju Yuan (福建京劇院) and the Taipei New Theatre (臺北新劇團). Defunct troupes include the Chongya Company of 1916 (崇雅社) and the Sanqingban 1790-1890 (三庆班).
