= Shi Yihong =

- Born: Shi Min; June 7, 1972 (age 54); Shanghai, China
- Education: National Academy of Chinese Theatre Arts
- Occupation: Peking opera performer
- Years active: 1991–present
- Employer: Shanghai Jingju Theatre Company
- Known for: Dan roles
- Style: Mei (Mei Lanfang) school
- Spouse: Li Chengru (m. 2002–2007)

Chinese name
- Chinese: 史依弘
Transcriptions
Standard Mandarin
- Hanyu Pinyin: Shǐ Yīhóng

Shi Min
- Chinese: 史敏
Transcriptions
Standard Mandarin
- Hanyu Pinyin: Shǐ Mǐn

Shi Yihong (born 7 June 1972), known as Shi Min before 2002, is a Chinese Peking opera singer-actress who plays Dan roles. A Plum Blossom Prize winner, Shi Yihong is considered a Peking opera superstar who not only excels in both vocal and acrobatic roles, but is always experimenting and expanding her repertoire despite resistance from conservative elements. Shi Yihong is a member of the Shanghai Jingju Theatre Company, but she also established her own production company in 2016.

Some of Shi Yihong's best known roles include: Consort Yu (from The Hegemon-King Bids His Concubine Farewell), Yang Yuhuan, Mu Guiying, Kou Zhu, Li Qingzhao, Lady Mi, Esmeralda (from The Hunchback of Notre-Dame), Wang Zhaojun, Madame White Snake, Xiao Guiying (from The Qing Ding Pearl), Duchess Zhuang (from Zhang Yimou's You and Me), Du Liniang, and countless others. She has also acted in Kunqu productions. In 1999, Shi Yihong starred in Tan Dun's The Gate, an orchestral theatre which debuted in Tokyo, Japan.

In 2018, Yihong Theatre opened in Baoshan District, Shanghai. This is the first theatre in Shanghai named after an opera artist.

== Filmography ==
=== Peking opera films and TV series ===
Shi Yihong starred in some Peking opera films and TV series based on stage productions, such as Exchanging a Leopard Cat for a Prince (1998 TV series), Farewell My Concubine (2014 film), and Li Qingzhao (2017 film).

=== Non-opera films and TV series ===
Year	English title	Original title	Role	Notes
2003	The Vicissitudes of Life	人生幾度秋涼	Mudanhong	TV series
2007	Stage Sisters	舞台姐妹	Wen Xiuzhu	TV series
2016	Mr. No Problem	不成問題的問題	Shen Yuemei	Film

=== Reality shows ===
- 2008: Let's Shake It (舞林大会) on Dragon Television
