= Gansu Provincial Ensemble of the Peking Opera =

China Gansu Provincial Ensemble of the Peking Opera is an opera company which operates as an adjunct of the China National Peking Opera Company in the province of Gansu, China. The ensemble was founded in 1956, and since then they have won awards such as the Wenhua, presented by China’s Ministry of Culture for works such as The tragedy of the king. Other works in the repertoire includes The stagnant water in ripple, Face changing, Turandot, Jinlian Pan, Hua Ziliang, and Along the silk road.

The ensemble toured Mexico in 2011, performing at the Festival Internacional Vallesano de Arte y Cultura (Festival de las Almas) in Valle de Bravo and the Festival Internacional Cervantino in Guanajuato. For this tour, the ensemble presented a work called The Wild Swans based on a story by Hans Christian Andersen. This work was created in collaboration with the Cultural Association of Denmark in 2005, the 200th anniversary of the Andersen’s birth.
