= Zhou Xinfang =

Chinese opera actor, musician (1895–1975)

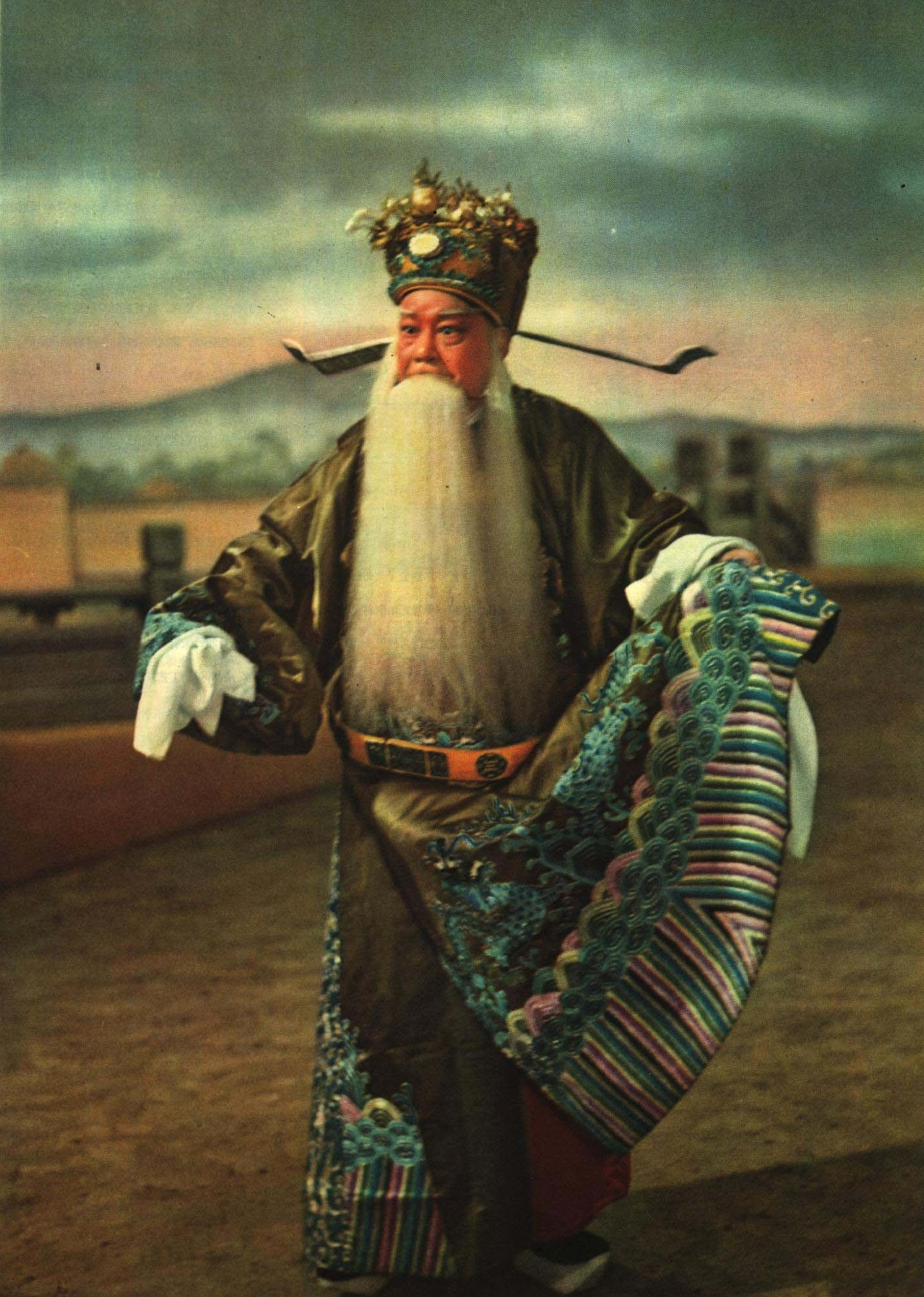
- Zhou Xinfang (1962)
- Born: 14 January 1895; Huai'an, Jiangsu, Qing Empire
- Died: 8 March 1975 (aged 80); Shanghai, China
- Other names: Qi Ling Tong, Age-Seven Boy, Qilin Boy
- Spouse: Lilian Qiu
- Children: 9, including Tsai Chin and Michael Chow
- Relatives: China Chow (granddaughter); Ho Yi (son-in-law)

Zhou Xinfang
- Chinese: 周信芳
Transcriptions
Standard Mandarin
- Hanyu Pinyin: Zhōu Xìnfāng
- Wade–Giles: Cho Hsin-fang

Qi-Ling Tong
- Traditional Chinese: 七齡童
- Simplified Chinese: 七龄童
- Literal meaning: Age-7 Boy
Transcriptions
Standard Mandarin
- Hanyu Pinyin: Qī-líng Tóng
- Wade–Giles: Ch`i-ling Tong

Qilin Tong
- Chinese: 麒麟童
- Literal meaning: Qilin Boy
Transcriptions
Standard Mandarin
- Hanyu Pinyin: Qílín Tóng
- Wade–Giles: Ch`i-lin T`ung

Zhou Xinfang (14 January 1895 – 8 March 1975), also known by his stage name Qilin Tong (meaning "Qilin Boy") was a Chinese actor and musician who was a Peking opera actor who specialized in its "old male" (老生, laosheng) roles. He is considered one of the greatest grand masters of Peking Opera of the 20th century and the best known and leading member of the Shanghai school of Peking opera. He was the first director of the Shanghai Peking Opera Company.

Over 650 Peking Operas performed by Zhou have been identified by the Zhou Xinfang Arts Research Centre in China by 2015, topping all actors in recorded Chinese performing arts history in terms of known number of repertoire titles. One of his operas, Hai Rui Submits His Memorial, was regarded as an attack on Chairman Mao Zedong, for which he was persecuted during the Cultural Revolution.

== Early life ==
Zhou, a native of Cixi, Ningbo, Zhejiang, was born on January 14, 1895, in Qingjiangpu, Jiangsu into a family with a tradition of opera performances. He started learning Peking Opera when he was six, and made his debut in a child role in Hangzhou at the age of seven, thus acquiring the stage name "Qi Ling Tong" or "Age-Seven Boy". When he was twelve, this stage name was changed to "Qilin Boy" as "age-seven" and qilin sound similar in Chinese.

== Career ==
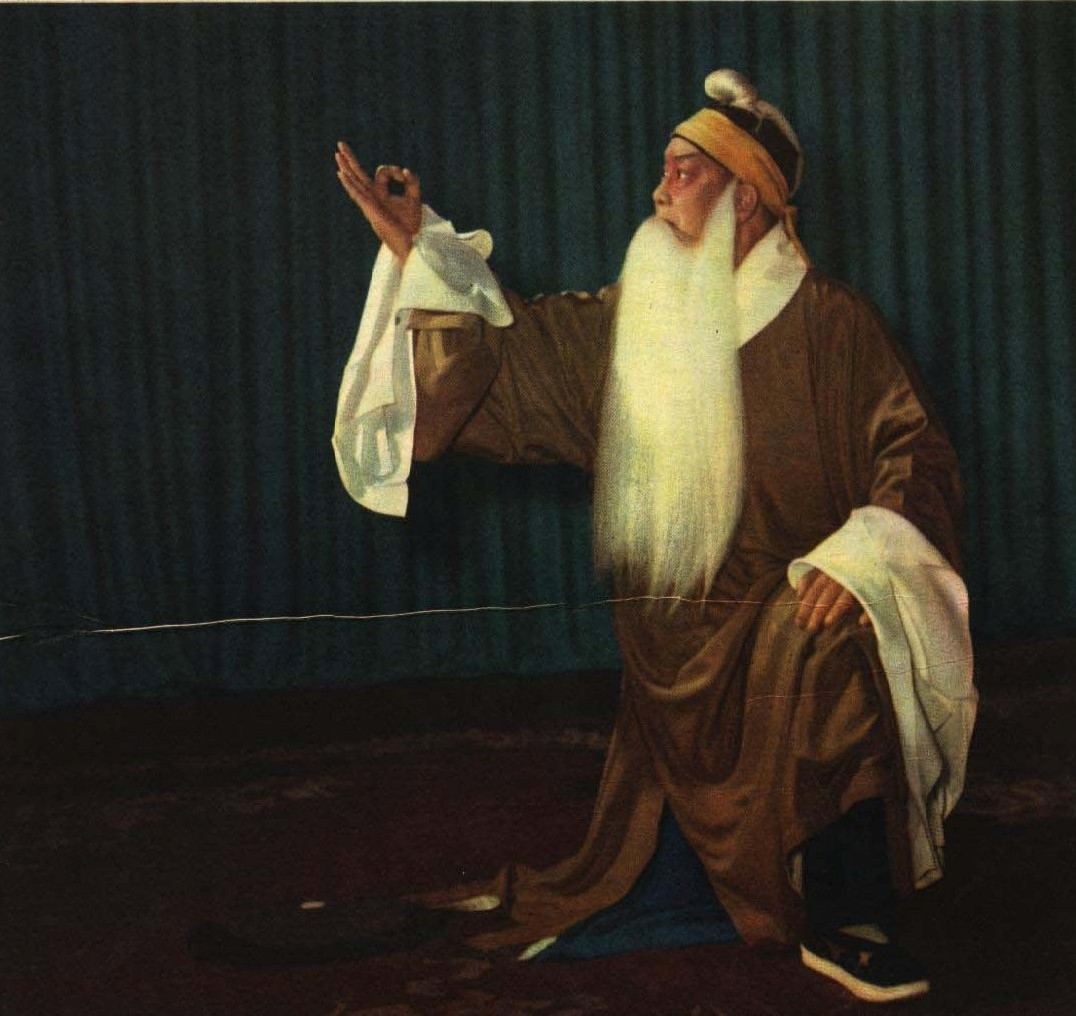
Zhou Xinfang as Song Shijie in Four Scholars in 1962.

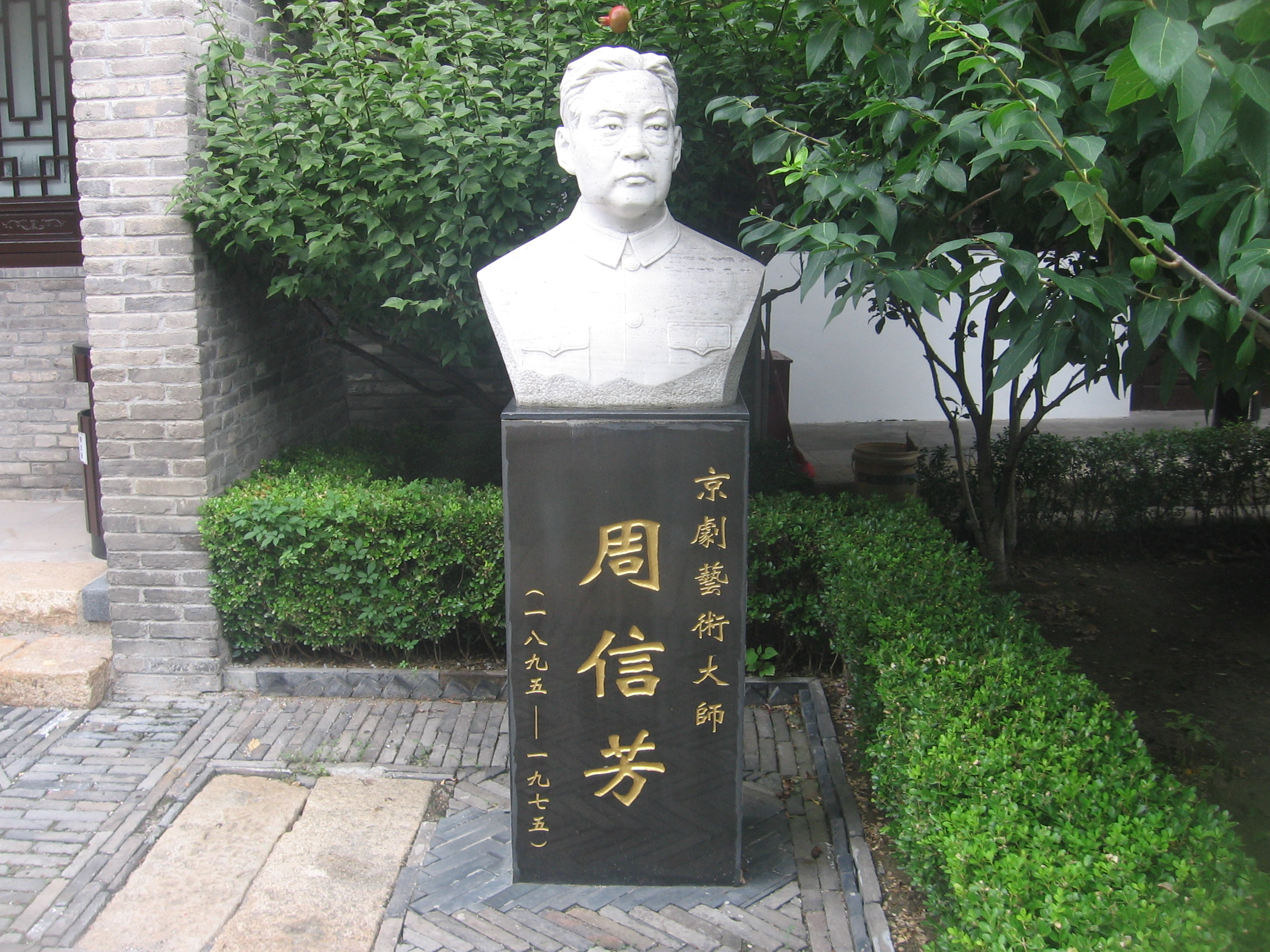
Statue of Zhou Xinfang in his birthplace Huai'an, Jiangsu, China.

Zhou started performing in Shanghai in 1906, and went to Beijing in 1908. He started performing major roles from the age of thirteen, and worked with notable opera singers such as Mei Lanfang and Tan Xinpei.

Zhou had a light husky singing voice and specialized in playing old male (laosheng) roles. He was often referred to as the "Southern Qi" (after his stage name Qilin Boy) in conjunction with "Northern Ma" (Ma Lianliang), another lao sheng performer. He developed his own unique vocal style, which came to be known as of the "Qi style" or "Qi school". He served as one of the mentors and guardians of the actress Li Yuru as she began her career.

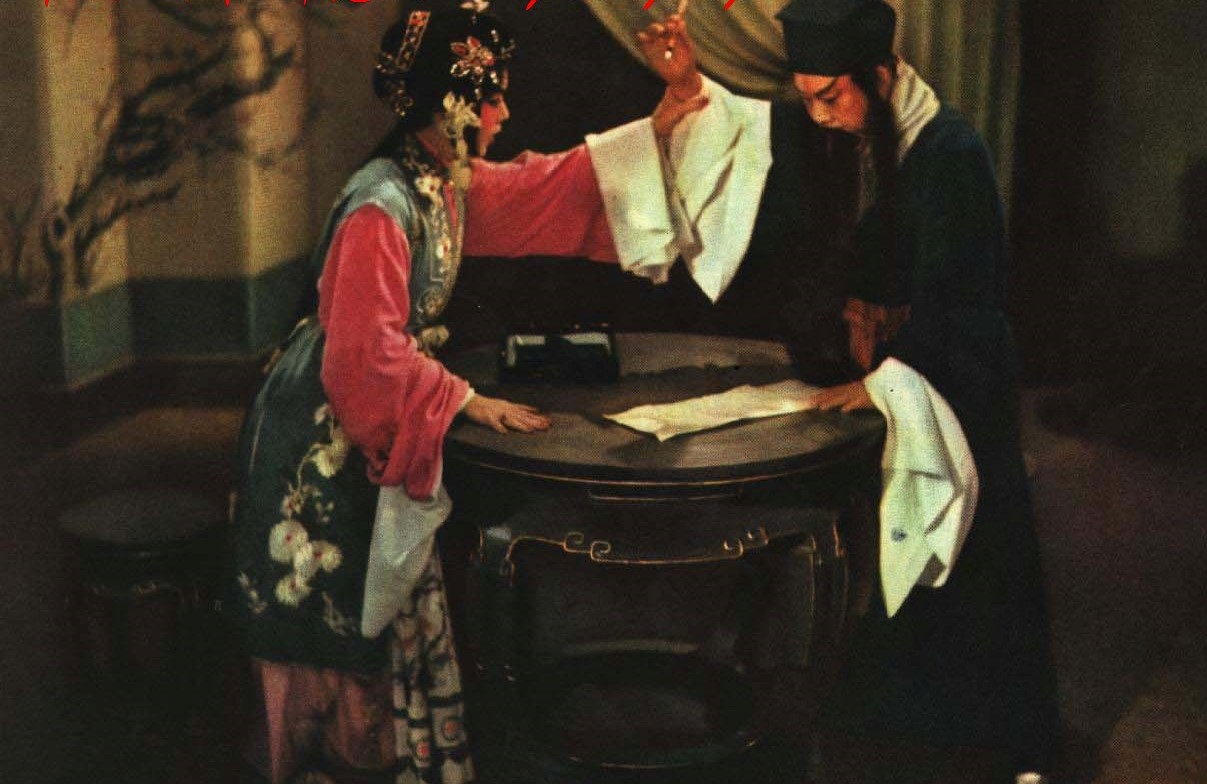
Zhou Xinfang performing in Black Dragon House in 1962.

Zhou revised many old operas, such as Xiao He Chases Han Xin in the Moonlight (蕭何月下追韓信), and wrote new plays. His famous performances include Black Dragon House (烏龍院), Xu Ce Scurries (徐策跑城), Four Scholars (四進士). He also starred in a few film adaptations of his operas, such as Song Shijie (宋士傑, adapted from Four Scholars) and Murder in the Oratory (斬經堂). According to the official "Zhou Xinfang Art Research Centre" in Shanghai, Zhou had performed over 650 titles of Peking Opera in his career. He made changes to traditional Peking Opera to suit the modern tastes of Shanghai audience, and this new style of Peking opera became known as the Shanghai School.

In the early years after the Communist takeover in 1949, Zhou was regarded favourably for having contributed directly to the revolutionisation of traditional opera. Zhou was appointed to a number of official positions, such as the Deputy Directorship of Chinese Opera Research Institute. In 1955, the Shanghai Peking Opera Company was founded and he became the director.

However, he would later come into conflict with part of the ruling clique. In 1964, Jiang Qing wanted the Shanghai Peking Opera troupe to rewrite and re-stage plays such as Taking Tiger Mountain by Strategy, plans which Zhou opposed but failed to stop.

== Hai Rui Submits His Memorial ==
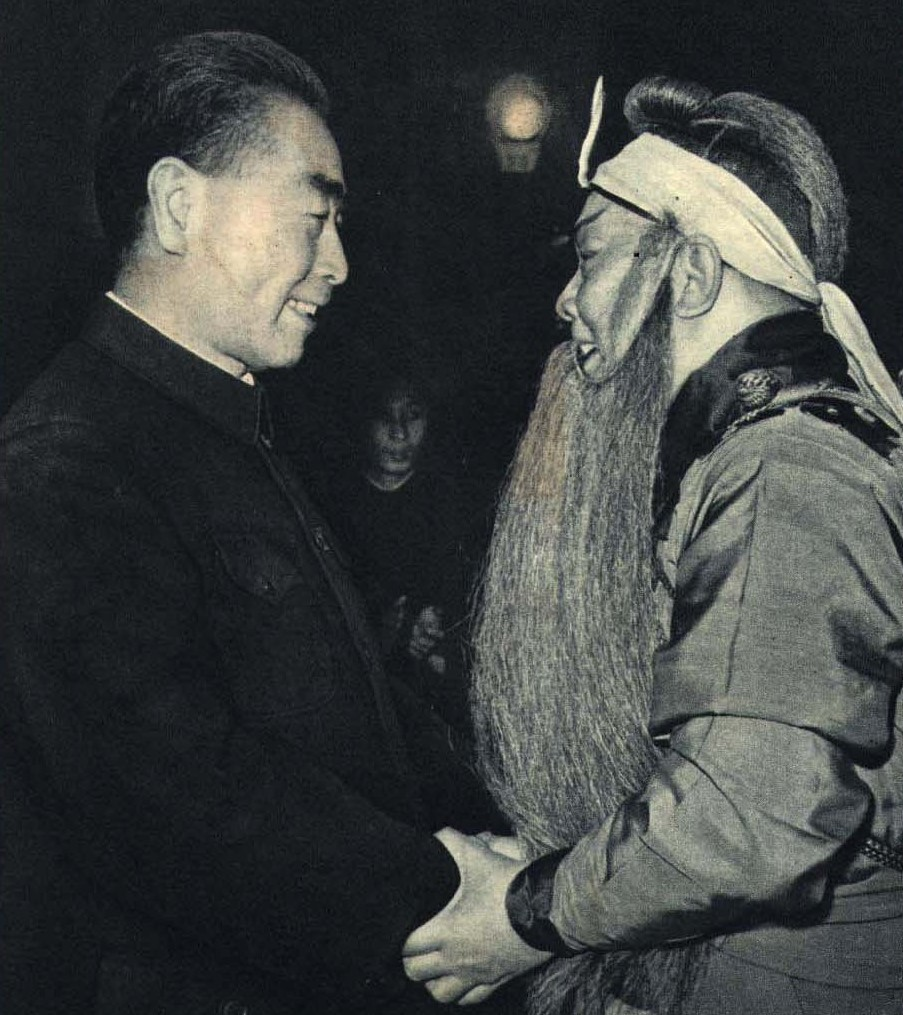
Zhou Xinfang and Zhou Enlai after a performance of The Qing Ding Pearl in 1962

Between 1958 and 1963, "new historical drama" became a prominent form of theatre in China, and such drama was often used for indirect critique of contemporary politics. In 1959, Zhou was asked to write a play for the 10th anniversary celebration in Shanghai of the founding of the People's Republic of China. The story would be about Hai Rui, a Ming Dynasty official noted for his integrity but was dismissed from office for criticizing the Jiajing Emperor. Zhou wrote the play Hai Rui Submits His Memorial (海瑞上疏, Hai Rui Shangshu) with Xu Siyan (许思言), and the play was performed by the Shanghai Peking Opera Troupe.

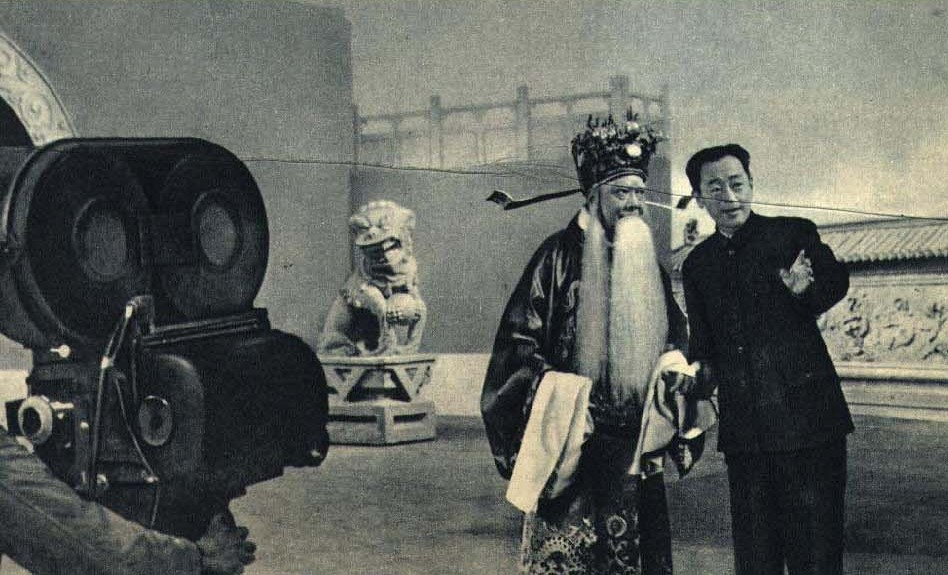
Zhou Xinfang and film director Ying Yunwei in 1962.

In Beijing, Wu Han also wrote another opera based on the same theme, Hai Rui Dismissed from Office. This opera was attacked by Yao Wenyuan in 1965, accusing the play of being a veiled criticism of Chairman Mao Zedong. The attack by Yao on Wu Han's work about Hai Rui is often considered the opening shot of the Cultural Revolution, and eventually led to the persecution and death of Wu Han.

Zhou was also criticized for attacking Chairman Mao in his portrayal of the Jiajing Emperor in his opera. Zhou however countered by saying that those who suggested any similarity of Jiajing Emperor to Mao were the real detractors of Mao. Zhou and his son were arrested and imprisoned during the Cultural Revolution, but he refused to recant. He was released from prison a year later but placed under house arrest until his death in 1975.

== Personal life ==
He was married to Fengjiao Liu in 1912, with whom he had three children. In 1928, he took Lilian Qiu (1905–1968) as his mistress, with whom he had six children, including three illegitimate children, Susan Cha, Cecilia Chung (Zhou Yi), and Tsai Chin. In the late 1930s, he divorced his wife and married Lilian Qiu, then bore another three children: William Chow, restaurateur Michael Chow, and Vivian Chow.

Zhou was the grandfather of actress China Chow. He was also father-in-law to actor/director Ho Yi, who is married to his youngest daughter, Vivian Chow.
