= CCTV-11 =

Chinese television channel

CCTV-11 戏曲
- Country: China

Programming
- Picture format: 1080i HDTV (downscaled to 576i for the SD feed

Ownership
- Owner: China Central Television

History
- Launched: 9 July 2001

Links
- Website: CCTV-11

Availability

Terrestrial
- Digital TV (DTMB): Digital channel number varies by area

Streaming media

CCTV-11 is the Chinese opera channel of the CCTV (China Central Television) Network in the People's Republic of China launched on July 9, 2001.

== Programming ==
- Film and Television Theater
- Local Opera
- Pear Garden Appreciation
- Studies with Me
- Famous Section Appreciation
- Play Park Hundred
- Theater in The Air
- Beijing Opera
