= Jing role =

Role type in Chinese opera

- Traditional Chinese: 淨
- Simplified Chinese: 净
- Literal meaning: Clean
Transcriptions
Standard Mandarin
- Hanyu Pinyin: Jìng
- Bopomofo: ㄐㄧㄥˋ
- Wade–Giles: Ching^{4}
- Tongyong Pinyin: Jìng
- IPA: [tɕîŋ]
Yue: Cantonese
- Yale Romanization: jihng
- Jyutping: zing6
- IPA: [tsɪŋ˨]

Hualian
- Traditional Chinese: 花臉
- Simplified Chinese: 花脸
- Literal meaning: Colorful (painted) Face
Transcriptions
Standard Mandarin
- Hanyu Pinyin: Huāliǎn
- Bopomofo: ㄏㄨㄚ ㄌㄧㄢˇ
- Wade–Giles: Hua^{1}-lien^{3}
- Tongyong Pinyin: Hua-liǎn
- IPA: [xwá.ljɛ̀n]
Yue: Cantonese
- Jyutping: faa1 lim5
- IPA: [fa˥ lim˩˧]

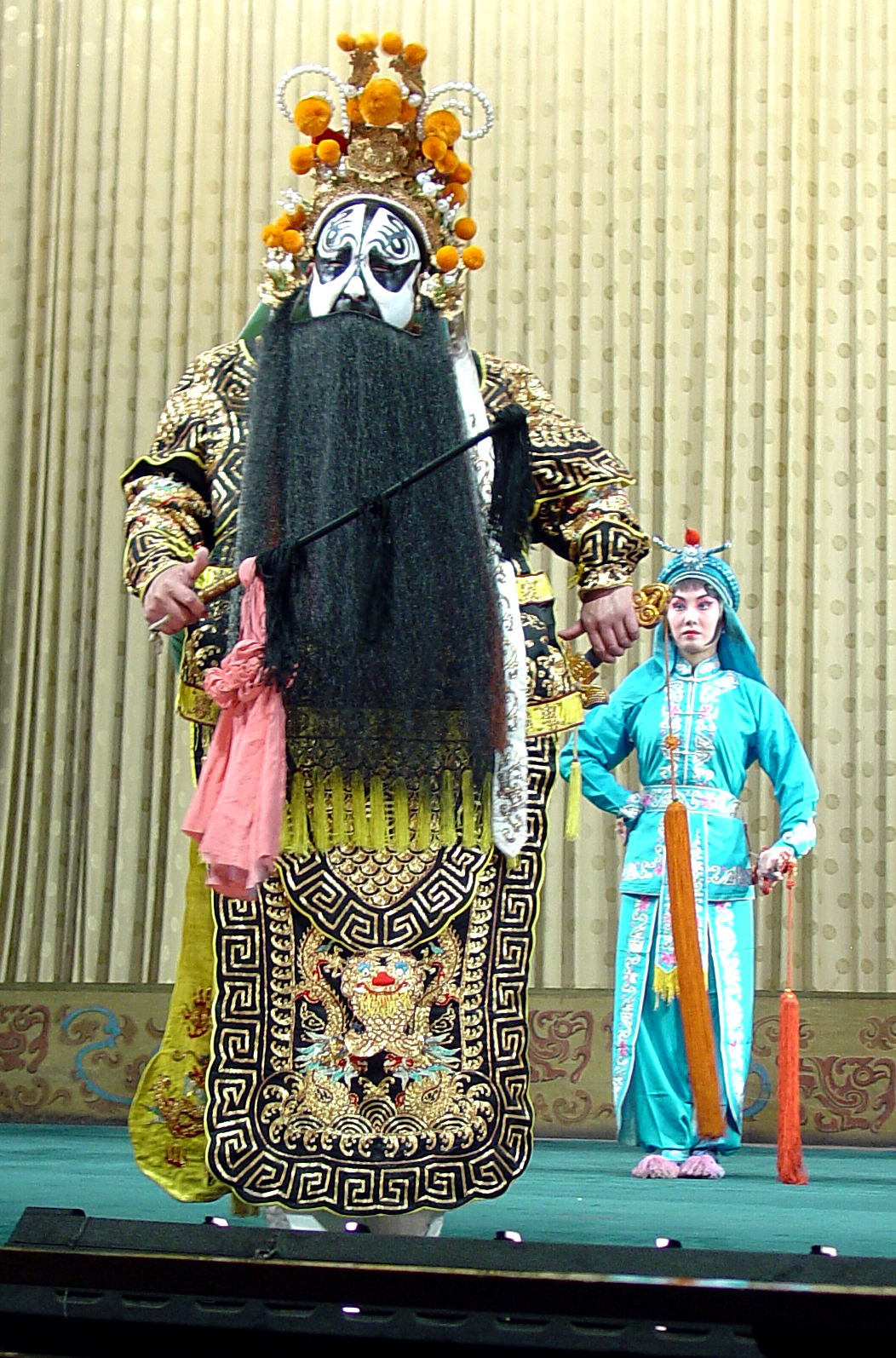
The hero Xiang Yu from the Peking opera The Hegemon-King Bids His Concubine Farewell is an example of a Jing character.

The Jing (simplified Chinese: 净; traditional Chinese: 淨) is a role type in Chinese opera for "rough" or "mighty" male characters. In many genres (such as Peking opera and Cantonese opera), this role requires heavy face painting. As a result, it is also known as Hualian ("Painted face"). However, not all characters with painted faces fall into this category, with Chou (clowns) being another major painted-face role type.

This type of role will entail a forceful character, so a Jing actor must have a strong voice and be able to exaggerate gestures. Depending on the repertoire of the particular troupe, he will play either primary or secondary roles. The colour and face design represents the identity and personality of the character.

== Face design ==
Face painting in Chinese theatre probably began with masks, and actors painted their faces as early as 9th-century Tang dynasty (618–907). During the Yuan dynasty (1271–1368) red and white facial designs were used in opera to distinguish good characters from bad ones. After the 14th century, facial patterns multiplied, and new colors have been introduced. Peking opera now boasts 15 basic facial patterns, but there are over 1000 specific variations. Each design is unique to a specific character. The patterns and coloring are thought to be derived from traditional Chinese color symbolism and divination on the lines of a person's face, which is said to reveal personality. Easily recognizable examples of coloring include:

- Red, denoting uprightness and loyalty (e.g. Guan Yu)
- White, representing evil or crafty characters (e.g. Cao Cao)
- Black, given to characters of soundness and integrity (e.g. Bao Zheng)

Later designs introduced other colors, such as:

- Purple, indicating steadfastness and integrity
- Yellow, showing impetuousness and boldness
- Blue, suggesting resolution and daring
- Green, meaning stubbornness and hotheadedness
- Gold and silver, used for supernatural beings

To emphasize a character's height and strength, the forehead is generally elongated, with the face design covering the entire face, from the crown to the chin and extending to both ears.

== Types ==
Three main types of Jing roles are often seen. These include tongchui, roles that heavily involve singing, jiazi, roles with less emphasis on singing and more on physical performance, and wujing, martial and acrobatic roles.
