= Shanghai Yue Opera House =

Theatre in Shanghai, China

Shanghai Yue Opera Group
- Traditional Chinese: 上海越劇院
- Simplified Chinese: 上海越剧院
- Hanyu Pinyin: Shànghǎi Yuèjù Yuàn
- Formation: 1955
- Type: Theatre group
- Purpose: Yue opera
- Location: Shanghai, China
- Website: www.yueju.net

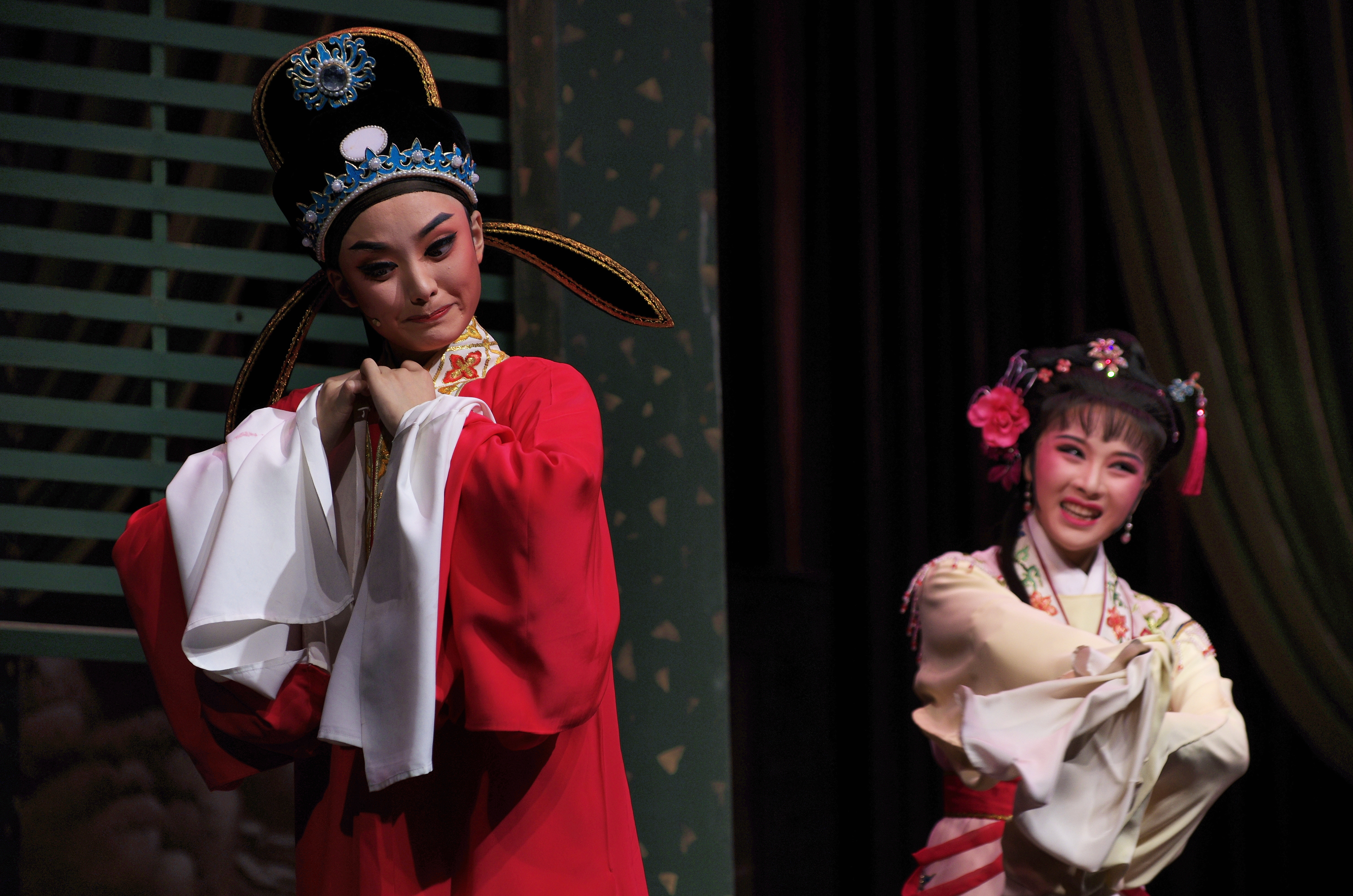
Actresses Wang Wanna (王婉娜) and Chen Xinyu (陈欣雨), then Shanghai Theatre Academy students, in 2016.

The Shanghai Yue Opera Group is a theatre in Shanghai, China, founded in 1950 and dedicated to Yue opera.

The Shanghai troupe is one of the more famous Yueju troupes (越剧剧团 Yueju jutuan).
