= Chou role =

Clown role in Chinese opera

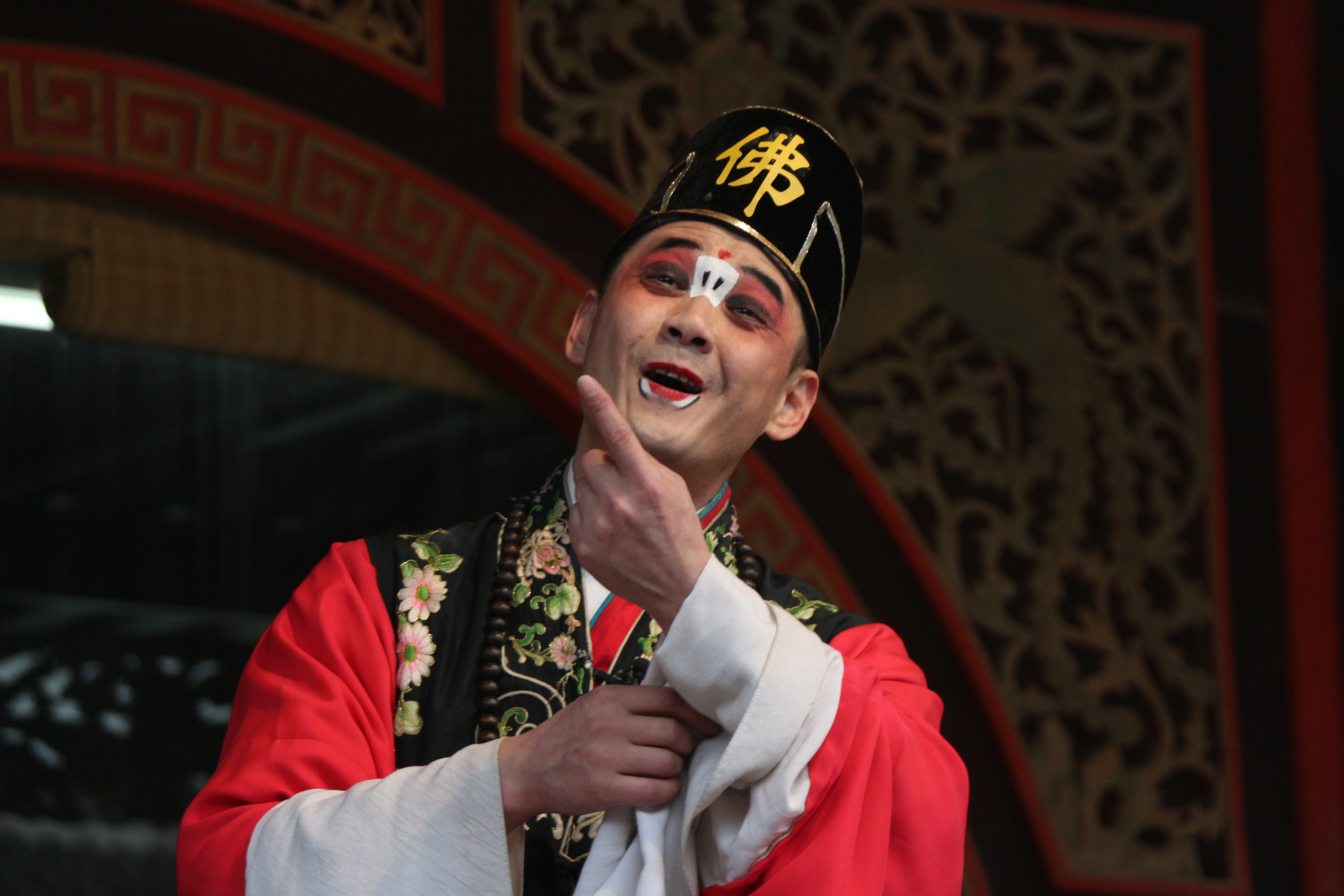
- A Chou role portrayed by a Kunqu actor.
- Chinese: 丑
- Literal meaning: clown
Transcriptions
Standard Mandarin
- Hanyu Pinyin: chǒu

Xiao Hualian
- Traditional Chinese: 小花臉
- Simplified Chinese: 小花脸
- Literal meaning: little painted face
Transcriptions
Standard Mandarin
- Hanyu Pinyin: Xiǎo Huāliǎn

The Chou is the clown role in Chinese opera. The Chou usually plays secondary roles in a troupe.

== Peking opera ==
Most studies of Peking opera classify the Chou as a minor role. Chou roles can be divided into Wen Chou (文丑), civilian roles such as merchants and jailers, and Wu Chou (武丑), minor military roles. The Wu Chou is one of the most demanding in Peking opera, because of its combination of comic acting, acrobatics, and a strong voice. Chou characters are generally amusing and likable, if a bit foolish. Their costumes range from simple for characters of lower status to elaborate, perhaps overly so, for high status characters. Chou characters wear special face paint, called xiaohualian, that differs from that of Jing characters. The defining characteristic of this type of face paint is a small patch of white chalk around the nose. This can represent either a mean and secretive nature or a quick wit. Originally, there were five roles in Beijing opera, but the last role "Mo" became a part of "Chou".

Beneath the whimsical persona of the Chou, a serious connection to the form of Peking opera exists. The Chou is the character most connected to the guban, the drums and clapper commonly used for musical accompaniment during performances. The Chou actor often uses the guban in solo performance, especially when performing Shu Ban, light-hearted verses spoken for comedic effect. The clown is also connected to the small gong and cymbals, percussion instruments that symbolize the lower classes and the raucous atmosphere inspired by the role. Although Chou characters do not sing frequently, their arias feature large amounts of improvisation. This is considered a license of the role, and the orchestra will accompany the Chou actor even as he bursts into an unscripted folk song. However, due to the standardization of Peking opera and political pressure from government authorities, Chou improvisation has lessened in recent years.

The Chou has a vocal timbre that is distinct from other characters, as the character will often speak in the common Beijing dialect, as opposed to the more formal dialects of other characters.
