= Sheng role =

Main male role in Chinese opera

Sheng
- Chinese: 生
- Literal meaning: "scholar"
Transcriptions
Standard Mandarin
- Hanyu Pinyin: shēng
- IPA: [ʂə́ŋ]

The sheng is a role type in Chinese opera for dignified and respectable male characters such as Confucian scholars, nobles, or heads of households. They may be portrayed by actors of either sex.

== Subtypes ==
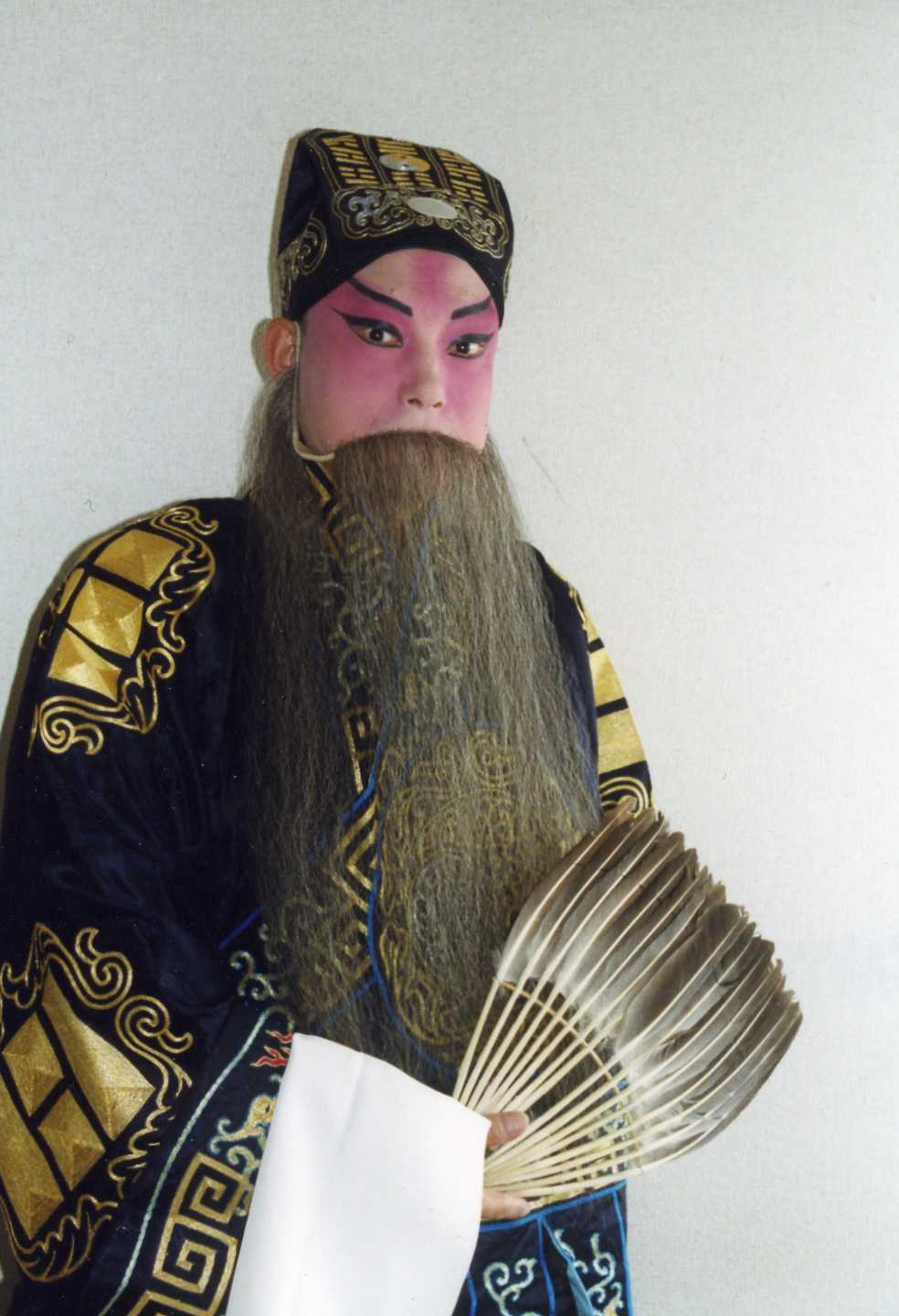
The strategist Zhuge Liang is an example of a laosheng character.

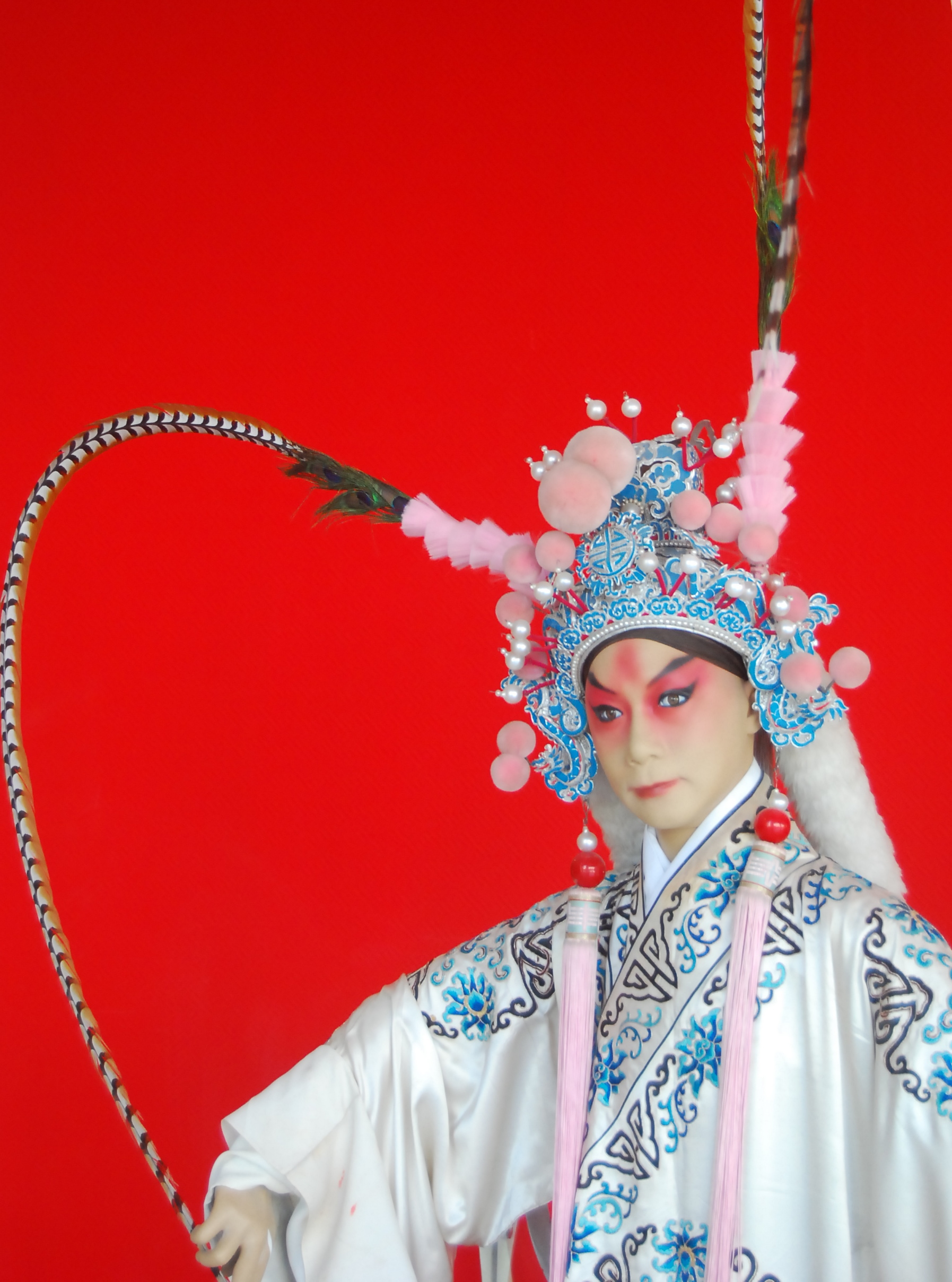
The young warrior Yang Wenguang is an example of a xiaosheng character. Attached to his helmet are two six-foot long pheasant feathers, known as lingzi, which indicate his military profession.

The sheng has numerous subtypes. The two major subdivisions are the laosheng (older gentlemen) and xiaosheng (younger gentlemen), with another important subtype being the wusheng (martial men). Peking opera troupes will always have a laosheng actor. A xiaosheng actor may be added to play roles fitting to his age. In addition to these main sheng, the troupe will also have a secondary laosheng.

=== Laosheng ===
The laosheng (Chinese: 老生; pinyin: lǎoshēng; lit. 'old sheng') is a dignified older role, usually distinguished by a long, thin, three-part beard. These characters have a gentle and cultivated disposition and typically wear long robes with water sleeves, high-soled boots, and fabric headdresses.

A subcategory is wulaosheng (Chinese: 武老生; pinyin: wǔlǎoshēng; lit. 'martial laosheng'), older generals who have combat skills. They wear armor and helmets instead of robes and fabric hats. Guan Yu, the Chinese god of sworn brotherhood, loyalty and righteousness, and Zhao Kuangyin, the first Song dynasty emperor, are the only two characters in the subcategory known as hongsheng (simplified Chinese: 红生; traditional Chinese: 紅生; pinyin: hóngshēng), a red-faced older male.

=== Xiaosheng ===
Young, beardless male characters are known as xiaosheng (Chinese: 小生; pinyin: xiǎoshēng; lit. 'young sheng'). They wear paler makeup than laosheng characters to show their youth. Xiaosheng characters are often involved with beautiful young women by virtue of the handsome and young image they project. Depending on the character's rank in society, the costume of the xiaosheng may be either elaborate or simple. In Peking opera, these characters sing in a high, shrill voice with occasional breaks to represent the voice changing period of adolescence.

The subcategories of xiaosheng are the wenxiaosheng (Chinese: 文小生; pinyin: wénxiǎoshēng; lit. 'civil xiaosheng') and the wuxiaosheng (Chinese: 武小生; pinyin: wǔxiǎoshēng; lit. 'martial xiaosheng'). The wuxiaosheng roles possess martial skills and are frequently young generals. Often, their filigree helmets are appended with two long pheasant feathers known as lingzi (Chinese: 翎子).

=== Wusheng ===
The wusheng (Chinese: 武生; pinyin: wǔshēng; lit. 'martial sheng') is a martial character for roles involving combat. They are highly trained in acrobatics, and have a natural voice when singing. In Peking opera, wusheng is further divided into two subcategories based on the character's costume:

- The changkao wusheng (simplified Chinese: 长靠武生; traditional Chinese: 長靠武生; pinyin: chángkào wǔshēng; lit. 'long-armor wusheng') are high-ranking warriors who wear armor (kao, 靠), helmets, and high-soled boots. They mainly use prop weapons.
- The duanda wusheng (Chinese: 短打武生; pinyin: duǎndǎ wǔshēng; lit. 'short-clothes wusheng') are individual fighters or disenfranchised criminals who wear tight jackets and trousers known as kuaiyi (Chinese: 快衣; lit. 'fast clothing') or baoyi (Chinese: 豹衣; lit. 'leopard clothing') and thin-soled boots. Some of them wear a beret known as luomao (simplified Chinese: 罗帽; traditional Chinese: 羅帽; lit. 'gauze hat'). They are more likely to engage in hand-to-hand combat.

== Cross-gender acting ==
In Yue opera, sheng roles have been mainly portrayed by actresses. Actresses playing men (sheng) is also common in some southern genres like Teochew opera and Taiwanese opera. It also appears in Ping opera.

In Peking opera, Meng Xiaodong was perhaps the first female superstar who specialized in sheng roles.
