= Anhui opera =

Anhui opera may refer to several distinct Chinese opera genres from Anhui province:

- Hui opera, originally from southern Anhui
- Huangmei opera, originally from southwestern Anhui, the most popular genre in Anhui
- Lu opera, originally from central Anhui
