= Ou opera =

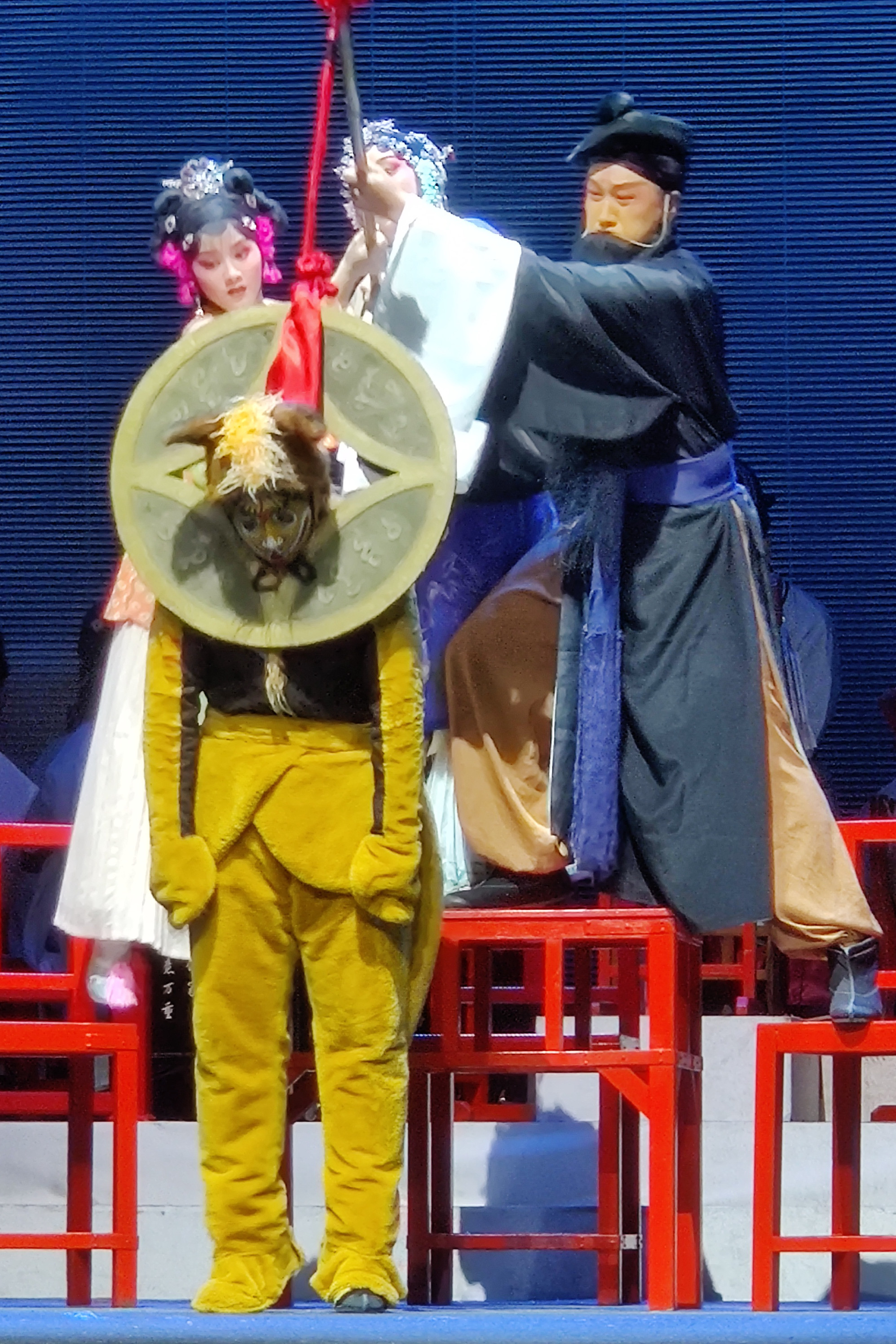
- The Ou opera Killing the Dog in 2019
- Native name: Ouju (瓯剧)
- Etymology: After Ou River
- Other names: Wenzhou luantan (温州乱弹), Yongjia luantan (永嘉乱弹)
- Origin: Early Qing dynasty
- Major region: Area around Wenzhou and other parts of southwestern Zhejiang; parts of northern Fujian and northeastern Jiangxi
- Topolect: Mainly Wenzhou-accented Mandarin Chinese, some Wenzhounese

Ouju
- Traditional Chinese: 甌劇
- Simplified Chinese: 瓯剧
Transcriptions
Standard Mandarin
- Hanyu Pinyin: Ōu jù

Wenzhou luantan
- Traditional Chinese: 溫州亂彈
- Simplified Chinese: 温州乱弹
- Literal meaning: Wenzhou mixed plucking
Transcriptions
Standard Mandarin
- Hanyu Pinyin: Wēnzhōu luàntán

Yongjia luantan
- Traditional Chinese: 永嘉亂彈
- Simplified Chinese: 永嘉乱弹
- Literal meaning: Yongjia mixed plucking
Transcriptions
Standard Mandarin
- Hanyu Pinyin: Yǒngjiā luàntán

Ou opera (Chinese: 瓯剧; pinyin: Ōujù), originally known as Wenzhou luantan (Chinese: 温州乱弹) or Yongjia luantan (Chinese: 永嘉乱弹), is a regional form of Chinese opera from Yongjia County, Wenzhou in southeastern Zhejiang province. In addition to Wenzhou and parts of neighboring Lishui and Taizhou (all in Zhejiang), it is also influential in parts of northern Fujian and northeastern Jiangxi.

In 2008, it was included in the national intangible cultural heritage list.

== History ==
Wenzhou was the birthplace of nanxi, a Chinese opera form of the 12th century. The earliest form of Ou opera, however, emerged only after the end of the Ming dynasty in the 17th century, when the singing styles of gaoqiang (高腔) and kunqiang gained popularity in southern Zhejiang. The luantan style arrived later and was co-opted by locals in their performances along with gaoqiang and kunqiang. In the beginning, performances took place on temple stages only during special occasions such as the one-month Nuo religious festival, temple fairs, dragon boat racing in Ou River, weddings, harvests, or other celebrations. As demand increased throughout the region, several farmer-performers in Yongjia County became full-time performers. In the mid-Qing dynasty, they also performed Hui opera, tanhuang (灘簧, a precursor of Xi opera), and shidiao (時調). Because luantan proved the most popular vocal style, it dominated the form which gradually became known as Yongjia luantan or Wenzhou luantan.
