= Wu opera =

Form of Chinese opera

- Legend of the White Snake, Nanjing, 3 October 2019
- Native name: Wuju
- Other names: Jinhua opera
- Traditional Chinese: 金華戲
- Simplified Chinese: 金华戏
- Hanyu Pinyin: Jīnhuáxì
- Origin: Qing dynasty
- Major region: Central Zhejiang, Northeastern Jiangxi
- Typical instruments: Dizi; Suona; Banhu; Drum
- Topolect: Wu Chinese (Jinhua dialect)
- Tune system: Yiyangqiang

Chinese name
- Traditional Chinese: 婺劇
- Simplified Chinese: 婺剧
Transcriptions
Standard Mandarin
- Hanyu Pinyin: Wùjù

Wuju (Chinese: 婺剧; pinyin: Wùjù), also known as Jinhua opera, is a form of Chinese opera from Jinhua in central Zhejiang province, east-central China. It is also performed in Lishui, Linhai, Jiande, Chun'an, Zhejiang, as well as in northeastern Jiangxi province, in cities such as Yushan, Shangrao, Guixi, Boyang, and Jingdezhen. It is named for Wuzhou (婺州), an ancient name for Jinhua.

There are eleven Wuju troupes in eastern China.
