= Chinese opera =

Chinese Opera
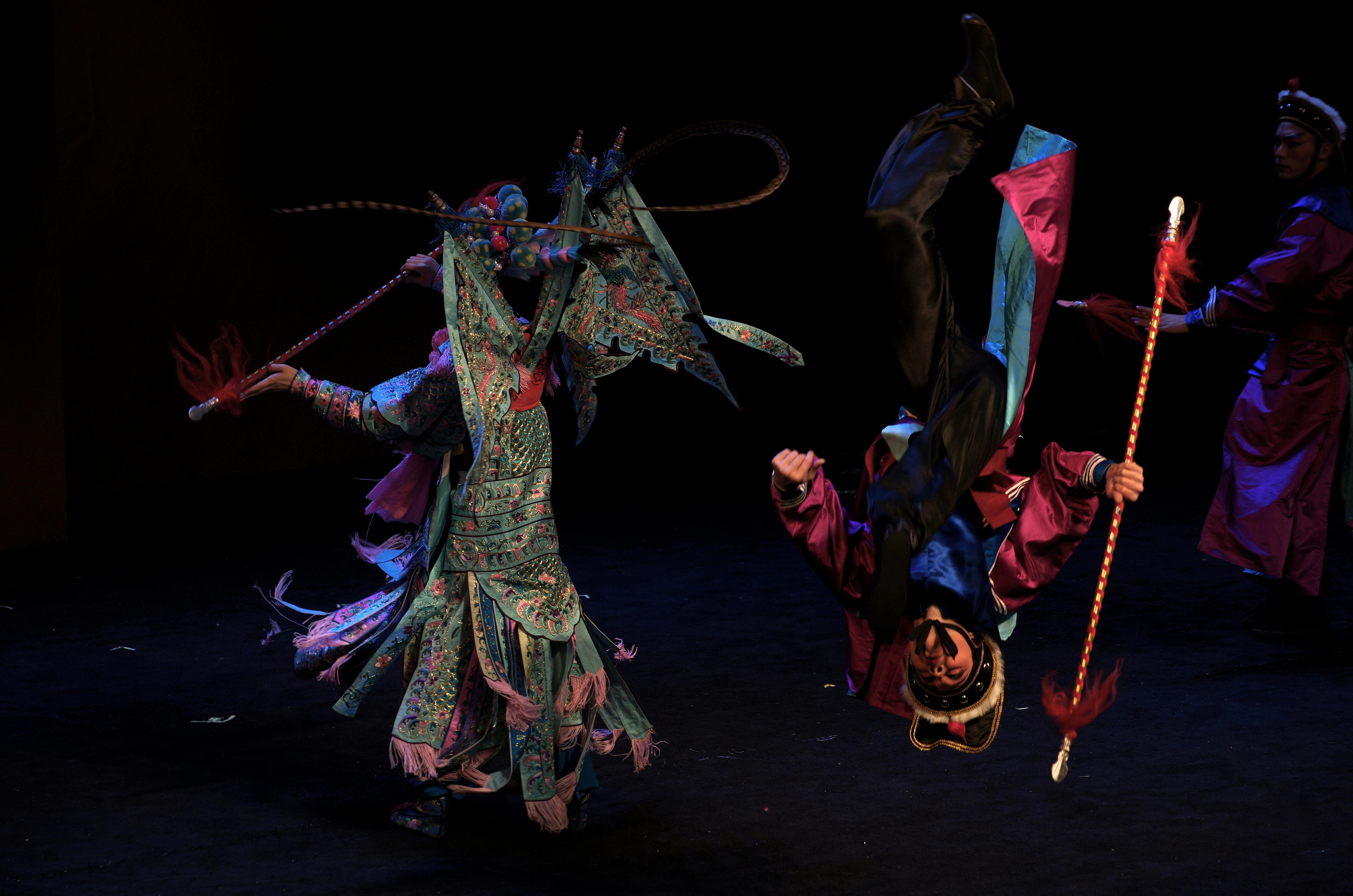
- Acrobatic performance in Shao opera (紹劇), demonstrating the martial arts element (打) of Chinese opera. Shanghai, 2014.
- Years active: 12th century – present (origins in Song–Yuan Zaju and Nanxi)
- Location: China (all provinces); Taiwan; Hong Kong; Macau; overseas Chinese communities (Southeast Asia, Americas, Europe)
- Influences: Ancient Chinese music, literature, dance, acrobatics, kungfu
- Influenced: Kabuki, Cải lương, modern Chinese theatre

Chinese opera
- Traditional Chinese: 戲曲
- Simplified Chinese: 戏曲
Transcriptions
Standard Mandarin
- Hanyu Pinyin: xìqǔ
- Wade–Giles: hsi^{4}-ch'ü^{3}
- IPA: [ɕî.tɕʰỳ]
Yue: Cantonese
- Yale Romanization: heikūk
- Jyutping: hei^{3}-kuk^{1}
- IPA: [hej˧.kʰʊk̚˧]
Southern Min
- Tâi-lô: hì-khek

Traditional Chinese opera (traditional Chinese: 戲曲; simplified Chinese: 戏曲; pinyin: xìqǔ; Jyutping: hei3 kuk1), or Xiqu, is a form of musical theatre in China with roots going back to the early periods in China. It is an amalgamation of various art forms that existed in ancient China, and evolved gradually over more than a thousand years, reaching its mature form in the 13th century, during the Song dynasty (960–1279 AD). Early forms of Chinese theater are simple; however, over time, various art forms such as music, song and dance, martial arts, acrobatics, costume and make-up art, as well as literary art forms were incorporated to form traditional Chinese opera. Performers had to practice for many years to gain an understanding of the roles. Exaggerated features and colors made it easier for the audience to identify the roles portrayed by the performers.

There are over a hundred regional branches of traditional Chinese opera today. In the 20th century, the Peking opera emerged in popularity and has come to be known as the "national theatre" of China, but other genres like Yue opera, Cantonese opera, Yu opera, kunqu, qinqiang, Huangmei opera, pingju, and Sichuan opera are also performed regularly before dedicated fans. Their differences are mainly found in the music and topolect; the stories are often shared and borrowed. With few exceptions (such as revolutionary operas and to some extent Shanghai operas) the vast majority of Chinese operas (including Taiwanese operas) are set in China before the 17th century, whether they are traditional or newly written.

For centuries, Chinese opera was the main form of entertainment for both urban and rural residents in China as well as the Chinese diaspora. Its popularity declined sharply in the second half of the 20th century as a result of both political and market factors. Language policies discouraging topolects in Taiwan and Singapore, official hostility against rural religious festivals in China, and de-Sinicization in Taiwan have all been blamed for the decline of various forms in different times, but overall the two major culprits were Cultural Revolution — which saw traditional culture systematically erased, innumerable theatre professionals viciously persecuted, and younger generation raised with far lesser exposure to Chinese opera – and modernization, with its immense social impact and imported values that Chinese opera has largely failed to counter. The total number of regional genres was determined to be more than 350 in 1957, but in the 21st century the Chinese government could only identify 162 forms for its intangible cultural heritage list, with many of them in immediate danger of disappearing. For young people, Chinese opera is no longer part of the everyday popular music culture, but it remains an attraction for many older people who find in it, among other things, a national or regional identity.

== History ==
=== Six dynasties to Tang ===
An early form of Chinese drama is the Canjun Opera (參軍戲, or Adjutant Play) which originated from the Later Zhao Dynasty (319–351 AD). In its early form, it was a simple comic drama involving only two performers, where a corrupt officer, Canjun or the adjutant, was ridiculed by a jester named Grey Hawk (蒼鶻). The characters in Canjun Opera are thought to be the forerunners of the fixed role categories of later Chinese opera, particularly of its comic chou (丑) characters.

Various song and dance dramas developed during the Six Dynasties period. During the Northern Qi Dynasty, a masked dance called the Big Face (大面, which can mean "mask", alternatively daimian 代面, and it was also called The King of Lanling, 蘭陵王), was created in honour of Gao Changgong who went into battle wearing a mask. Another was called Botou (撥頭, also 缽頭), a masked dance drama from the Western Regions that tells the story of a grieving son who sought a tiger that killed his father. In The Dancing Singing Woman (踏謡娘), which relates the story of a wife battered by her drunken husband, the song and dance drama was initially performed by a man dressed as a woman. The stories told of in these song-and-dance dramas are simple, but they are thought to be the earliest pieces of musical theatre in China, and the precursors to the more sophisticated later forms of Chinese opera.

These forms of early drama were popular in the Tang dynasty where they further developed. For example, by the end of the Tang Dynasty the Canjun Opera had evolved into a performance with more complex plot and dramatic twists, and it involved at least four performers. The early form of Chinese theatre became more organized in the Tang dynasty with Emperor Xuanzong (712–755), who founded the "Pear Garden" (梨园/梨園; líyuán), the first academy of music to train musicians, dancers and actors. The performers formed what may be considered the first known opera troupe in China, and they performed mostly for the emperors' personal pleasure. To this day operatic professionals are still referred to as "Disciples of the Pear Garden" (梨园弟子 / 梨園弟子, líyuán dìzi).

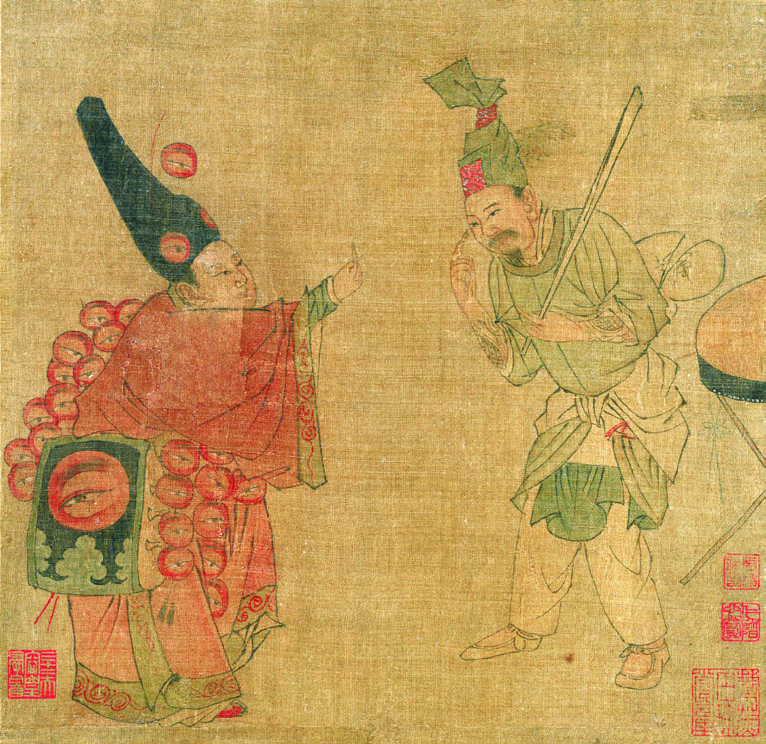
A Song dynasty painting depicting a scene from the zaju play Eye Drop Acid (眼藥酸; Yanyao suan). Palace Museum.

=== Song to Qing ===
By the Song Dynasty, Canjun Opera had become a performance that involved singing and dancing, and led to the development of Zaju (雜劇). Forms such as the Zaju and Nanxi (南戏) further matured in the Song dynasty (960–1279) and Yuan dynasty (1279–1368). Acts based on rhyming schemes and innovations such as specialized roles like Dan (旦, dàn, female), Sheng (生, shēng, male), Hua (花, huā, painted-face) and Chou (丑, chŏu, clown) were introduced into the opera. Although actors in theatrical performances of the Song Dynasty strictly adhered to speaking in Classical Chinese onstage, during the Yuan Dynasty actors speaking or performing lyrics in the vernacular tongue became popular on stage. These actors occupied very low positions in the social hierarchy of Song and Yuan; however, although performing on stage remained a low-status occupation, playwrighting became an increasingly prominent activity among higher-status literati like Guan Hanqing 關漢卿 (c. 1241–1320) and Ma Zhiyuan 馬致遠 (c. 1250–1321). Although men like Guan might occasionally perform on stage, this work largely remained the domain of lower-status actors.

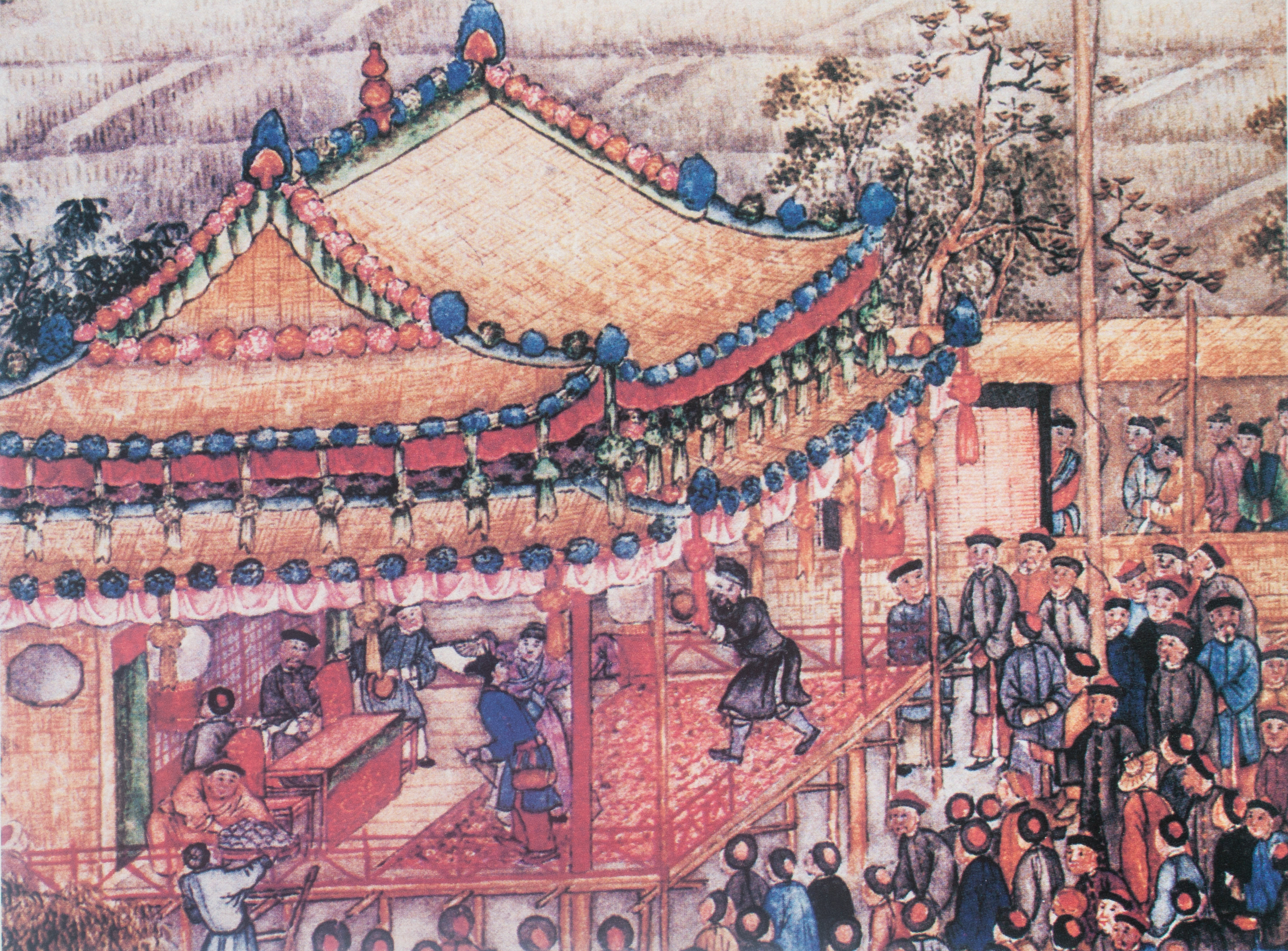
Theatre play, Prosperous Suzhou by Xu Yang, 1759

In the Yuan poetic drama, only one person sang for all of the four acts, but in the poetic dramas that developed from Nanxi during the Ming dynasty (1368–1644), all the characters were able to sing and perform. Playwright Gao Ming late in the Yuan dynasty wrote an opera called Tale of the Pipa which became highly popular, and became a model for Ming dynasty drama as it was the favorite opera of the first Ming emperor Zhu Yuanzhang. The presentation at this point resembled the Chinese opera of today, except that the librettos were then very long. The operatic artists were required to be skilled in many fields; according to Recollections of Tao An (陶庵夢憶) by Zhang Dai, performers had to learn how to play various musical instruments, singing and dancing before they were taught acting.

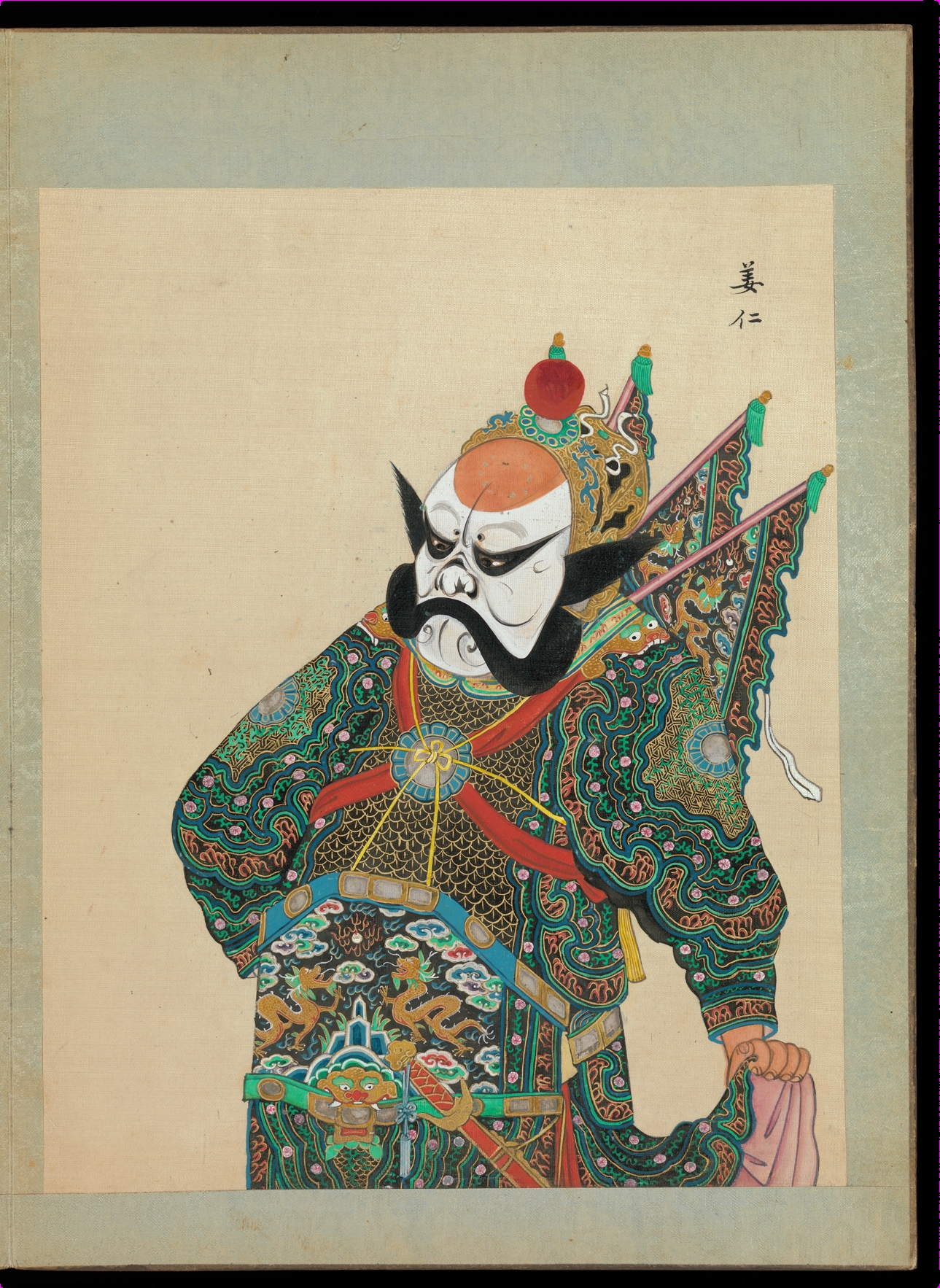
Leaf from an album of one hundred Peking opera characters, late Qing dynasty. Ink and color on silk. Metropolitan Museum of Art.

The dominant form of the Ming and early Qing dynasties was Kunqu, which originated in the Wu cultural area. A famous work in Kunqu is The Peony Pavilion by Tang Xianzu. Kunqu later evolved into a longer form of play called chuanqi, which became one of the five melodies that made up Sichuan opera. Currently Chinese operas continue to exist in 368 different forms, the best known being Beijing opera, which assumed its present form in the mid-19th century and was extremely popular in the latter part of the Qing dynasty (1644–1911).

In Beijing opera, traditional Chinese string and percussion instruments provide a strong rhythmic accompaniment to the acting. The acting is based on allusion: gestures, footwork, and other body movements express such actions as riding a horse, rowing a boat, or opening a door. Spoken dialogue is divided into recitative and Beijing colloquial speech, the former employed by serious characters and the latter by young females and clowns. Character roles are strictly defined, and each character have their own elaborate make-up design. The traditional repertoire of Beijing opera includes more than 1,000 works, mostly taken from historical novels about political and military struggles.

=== 1912–1949 ===
At the turn of the 20th century, Chinese students returning from abroad began to experiment with Western plays. Following the May Fourth Movement of 1919, a number of Western plays were staged in China, and Chinese playwrights began to imitate this form. The most notable of the new-style playwrights was Cao Yu (b. 1910). His major works—Thunderstorm, Sunrise, Wilderness, and Peking Man—written between 1934 and 1940, have been widely read in China.

The Republican Era saw the rise of Yue opera and all female Yue Opera troupes in Shanghai and Zhejiang. A woman-centric form, with all female casts and majority female audience members, plots were often love stories. Its rise was related to the changing place of women in society.

In the 1930s, theatrical productions performed by traveling Red Army cultural troupes in Communist-controlled areas were consciously used to promote party goals and political philosophy. By the 1940s, theater was well established in the Communist-controlled areas.

=== 1949–1985 ===
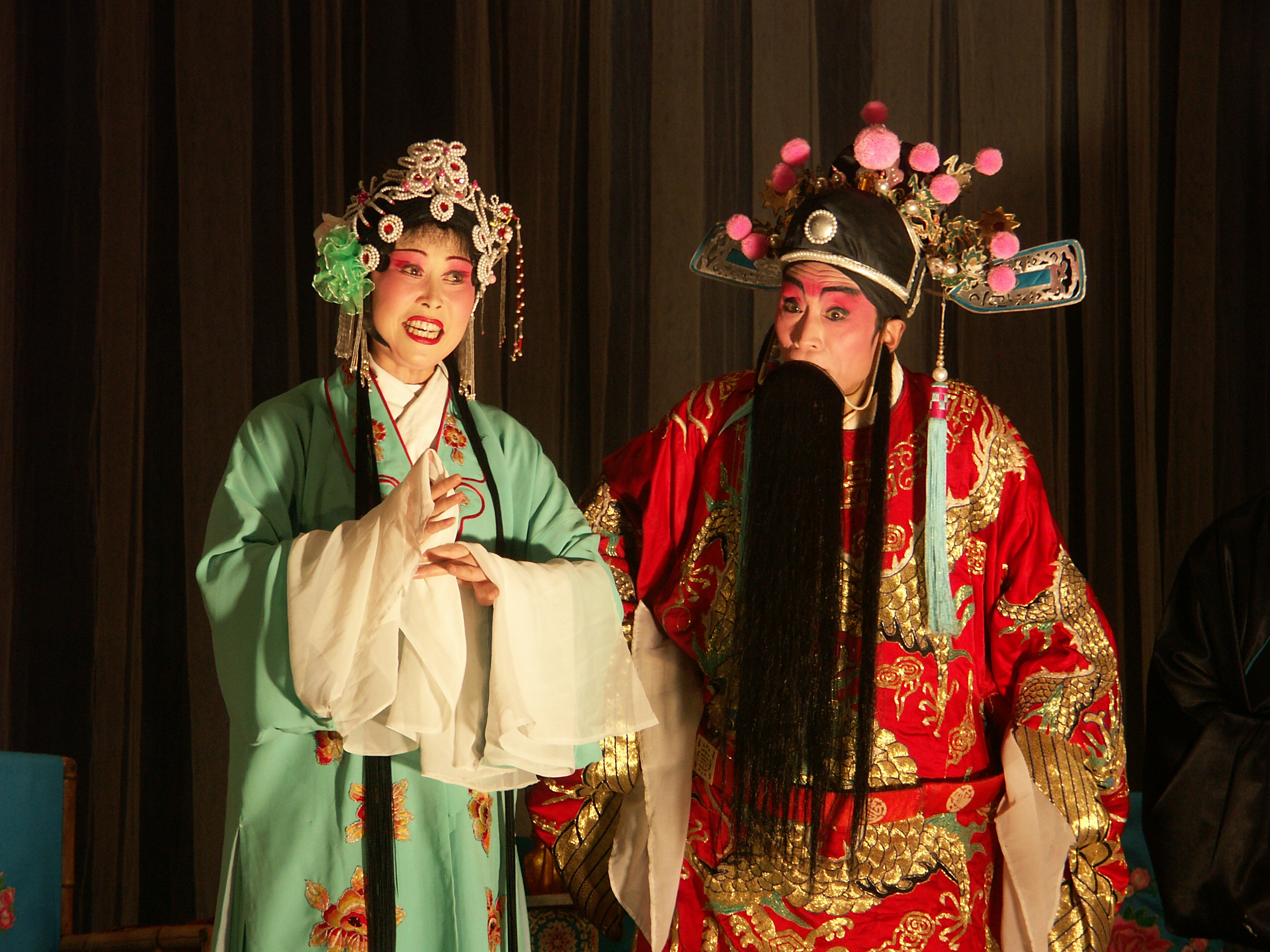
Sichuan opera in Chengdu

In the early years of the People's Republic of China, development of Peking opera was encouraged; many new operas on historical and modern themes were written, and earlier operas continued to be performed. As a popular art form, opera has usually been the first of the arts to reflect changes in Chinese policy. In the mid-1950s, for example, it was the first to benefit under the Hundred Flowers Campaign, such as the birth of Jilin opera.

In 1954 there were approximately 2000 government-sponsored opera troupes working throughout China each consisting of 50–100 professional performers. Despite its popularity, Peking opera made up a small percentage of these troupes. After the Chinese Communist Revolution a new genre emerged known as Schinggo opera which encompassed the revolutionary energy of the current sociopolitical climate. This operatic style built its foundation from the folk traditions of the rural community while also becoming influenced by European music.

Opera may be used as commentaries on political affairs, and in November 1965, the attack on Beijing deputy mayor Wu Han and his historical play Hai Rui Dismissed from Office as anti-Mao, signaled the beginning of the Cultural Revolution. During the Cultural Revolution, most opera troupes were disbanded, performers and scriptwriters were persecuted, and all operas were banned except the eight "model operas" that had been sanctioned by Jiang Qing and her associates. Western-style plays were condemned as "dead drama" and "poisonous weeds", and were not performed. After the fall of the Gang of Four in 1976, Beijing Opera enjoyed a revival and continued to be a very popular form of entertainment, both on stage and television.

=== Present ===
In the 21st century, Chinese opera is seldom publicly staged except in formal Chinese opera houses. It may also be presented during the lunar seventh month Chinese Ghost Festival in Asia as a form of entertainment to the spirits and audience. More than thirty famous pieces of Kunqu opera continue to be performed today, including The Peony Pavilion, The Peach Blossom Fan, and adaptions of Journey to the West, Romance of the Three Kingdoms.

In 2001, Kunqu was recognized as Masterpiece of Oral and Intangible Heritage of Humanity by United Nations Educational, Cultural and Scientific Organization (UNESCO)

== Costume and make-up ==
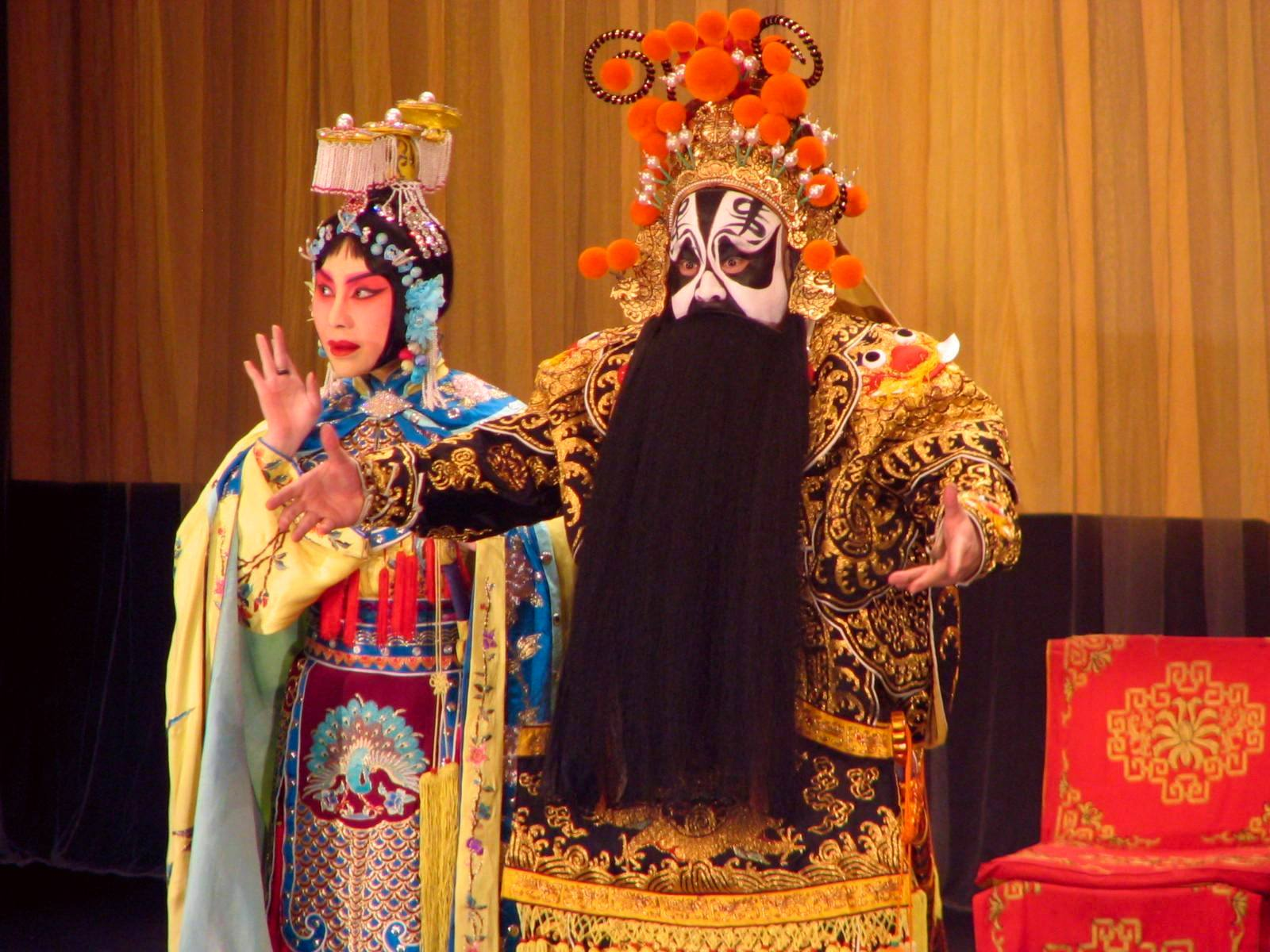
Costume and makeup in the opera Farewell My Concubine

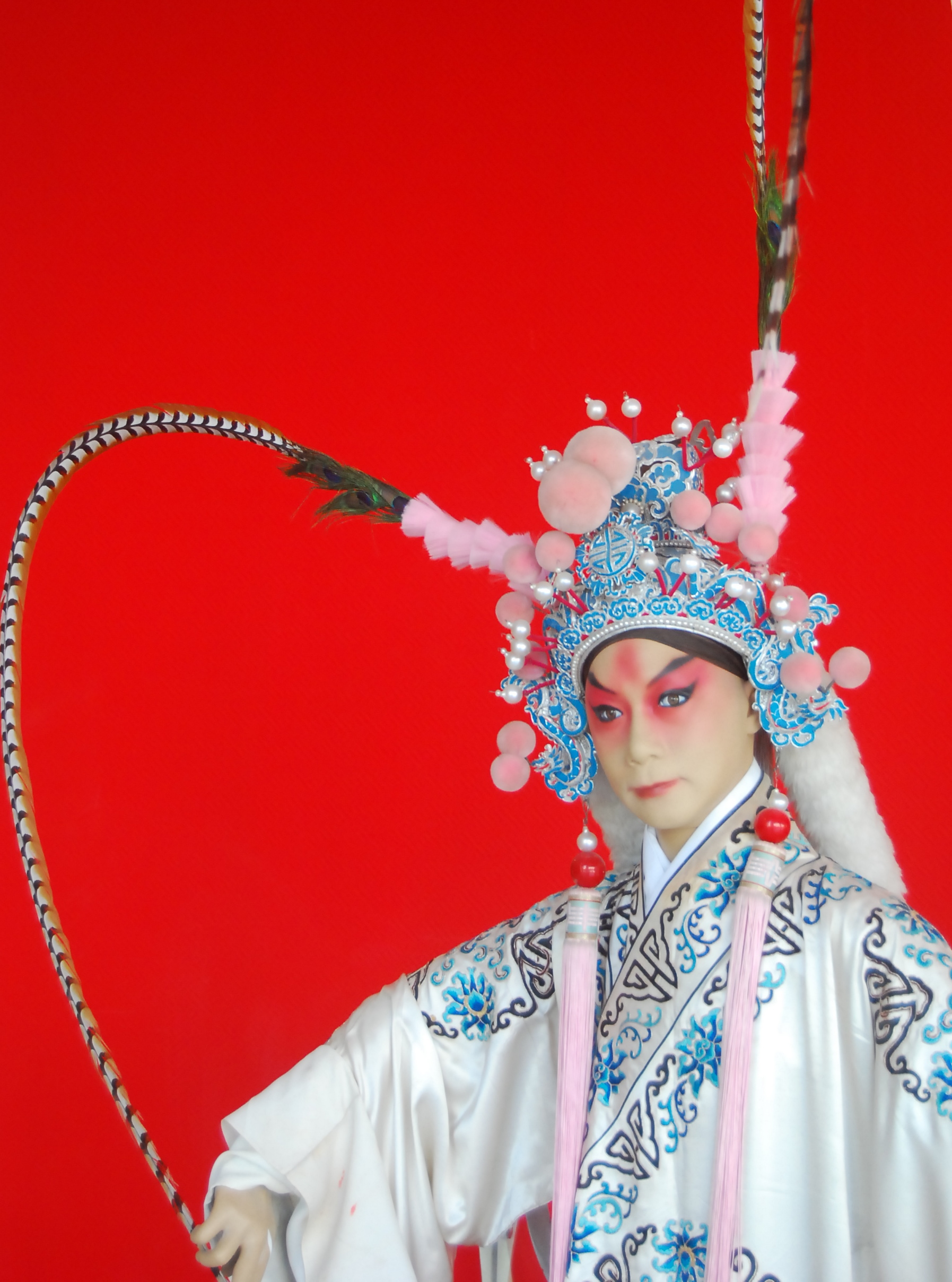
Costume and makeup of a sheng character

Face paint plays a significant role in portraying the internal complexities of the performer's character with hundreds of combinations of colours and patterns. Below are some general meanings which may be further focused on extremely specific details depending on the facial location of the colour.

- Red – bravery, fidelity, loyalty, chastity
- Black – impatience, straightforwardness, vulgarity, rudeness
- White – cunning, treachery, villainy, betrayal
- Blue – ferocity, courage, uncontrollability, cruelty, violence
- Yellow – cleverness, secretiveness, mystery, evil
- Purple – loyalty, filial piety, age
- Green – bravery, purpose, an evil spirit
- Gold and silver – godhood, divinity, the supernatural (monsters, spirits, demons)

== Musical characteristics ==
The musical components of Chinese opera are created as an inseparable entity from voice and dance/movement. Both the musicians and the actors contribute to composing musical accompaniment. This collaborative process is reflected within the production by the immaculate synchronicity between the actors' movements and the sounds of the orchestra. The musicians are required to flawlessly support the actors with sound, often waiting for vocal cues or physical signals such as the stomp of a foot. Traditionally, musicians often performed from memory – a feat made even more impressive considering pieces or sections of compositions were subject to infinite variations and often repeated.

The orchestra utilized a pentatonic scale until a 7-note scale was introduced by Mongolia during the Yuan Dynasty. The two extra notes functioned similarly to accidentals within western notation.

=== Instruments ===
The instruments in the orchestra were divided into two categories:

- wen – string and wind instruments: characterized as clear, soft, or gentle and typically used during vocal pieces.
- wu – percussive instruments: led dancing and movement, kettle drum "conducts" the whole orchestra, gongs signal audience to sit, appearance of female lead, anger, and fighting.

==== String ====
Traditional Chinese string instruments used in Chinese Opera include:

- Gaohu
- Erhu
- Pipa
- Sanxian
- Yangqin
- Yueqin
- Jinghu
- Jing erhu
- Banhu
- Erxian

==== Percussion ====
Traditional Chinese percussion instruments used in Chinese Opera include:

- Paiban
- Bo
- Bangu
- Daluo
- Xiaoluo

==== Woodwind ====
Traditional Chinese woodwind instruments used in Chinese Opera include:

- Dizi
- Suona
- Sheng
- Guan

== Regional genres ==
English name	Chinese name(s)	Major geographical areas
Peking opera	Jingju (京劇)	Cities nationwide on mainland, Hong Kong, Taiwan
Kunqu	Kunqu (崑曲) or Kunju (崑劇)	Cities nationwide on mainland, Taiwan
Nuo opera	Nuoxi (傩戲)	Certain rural areas in Hunan, Hubei, Guizhou, Jiangxi, Guangxi, Anhui, Shanxi, Hebei
Northeast China
Longjiang opera	Longjiangju (龍江劇)	Heilongjiang
Jilin opera	Jiju (吉劇)	Jilin
Laba opera	Labaxi (喇叭戲)	Haicheng (central Liaoning)
North China
Ping opera	Pingju (評劇)	Hebei, Beijing, Tianjin, Heilongjiang, Jilin, Liaoning
Hebei bangzi	Hebei bangzi (河北梆子)	Hebei, Beijing, Tianjin, northwestern Shandong
Laodiao	Laodiao (老調)	Central Hebei, Beijing, Tianjin
Hahaqiang	Hahaqiang (哈哈腔)	Central Hebei, northwestern Shandong
Sixian	Sixian (絲弦)	Hebei, Shanxi
Sai opera	Saixi (賽戲)	Southern Hebei, northern Shanxi
Siguxian	Siguxian (四股弦)	Southern Hebei
Xidiao	Xidiao (西調)	Handan (southern Hebei)
Pingdiao	Pingdiao (平調)	Wu'an (southern Hebei)
Xilu Bangzi	Xilu Bangzi (西路梆子)	Haixing County (southeastern Hebei)
Shanxi opera	Jinju (晉劇)	Shanxi, western Hebei, central Inner Mongolia, northern Shaanxi
Yangge opera	Yanggexi (秧歌戲)	Shanxi, Hebei, Shaanxi
Daoqing opera	Daoqingxi (道情戲)	
Errentai	Errentai (二人臺)	Northern Shaanxi, northwestern Shanxi, northwestern Hebei, central Inner Mongolia
Xianqiang	Xianqiang (線腔)	Southernmost Shanxi, westernmost Henan, eastern Shaanxi
Pu opera	Puju (蒲劇) or Puzhou Bangzi (蒲州梆子)	Shanxi
Northwest China
Qinqiang	Qinqiang (秦腔)	Shaanxi, Gansu, Ningxia, Xinjiang
Tiao opera	Tiaoxi (跳戲)	Heyang County (central Shaanxi)
Guangguang opera	Guangguangxi (桄桄戲)	Hanzhong (southwestern Shaanxi)
Xiaoqu opera	Xiaoquxi (小曲戲)	Gansu
Quzi opera	Quzixi (曲子戲)	Northern Gansu, Xinjiang
Gaoshan opera	Gaoshanxi (高山戲)	Longnan (southern Gansu)
Henan and Shandong
Henan opera	Yuju (豫劇)	Henan, southern Hebei, Taiwan
Qu opera	Quju (曲劇)	Henan
Yuediao	Yuediao (越調)	Henan, northern Hubei
Wuyin opera	Wuyinxi (五音戲)	Central Shandong
Lü opera	Lüju (呂劇)	Southwestern Shandong
Maoqiang	Maoqiang (茂腔)	Jiaozhou Bay (eastern Shandong)
Anhui and Jiangsu
Huangmei opera	Huangmeixi (黃梅戲)	Anhui, eastern Hubei, Taiwan
Sizhou opera	Sizhouxi (泗州戲)	Northeastern Anhui, northwestern Jiangsu
Lu opera	Luju (廬劇)	Central Anhui
Hui opera	Huiju (徽劇)	Southern Anhui, northeastern Jiangxi
Huaihai opera	Huaihaixi (淮海戲)	Northern Jiangsu
Yangzhou opera	Yangju (揚劇)	Yangzhou (central Jiangsu)
Huai opera	Huaiju (淮劇)	Central Jiangsu
Wuxi opera	Xiju (錫劇)	Wuxi and Changzhou (southern Jiangsu)
Suzhou opera	Suju (蘇劇)	Suzhou (southern Jiangsu)
Tongzi opera	Tongzixi (童子戲)	Nantong (southeastern Jiangsu)
Zhejiang and Shanghai
Yue opera	Yueju (越劇)	Zhejiang, Shanghai, southern Jiangsu, northern Fujian
Shanghai opera	Huju (滬劇)	Shanghai
Huzhou opera	Huju (湖劇)	Huzhou (northern Zhejiang)
Shao opera	Shaoju (紹劇)	Shaoxing (northern Zhejiang)
Yao opera	Yaoju (姚劇)	Yuyao (northern Zhejiang)
Ningbo opera	Yongju (甬劇)	Ningbo (northern Zhejiang)
Wu opera	Wuju (婺劇)	Western Zhejiang
Xinggan opera	Xingganxi (醒感戲)	Yongkang (central Zhejiang)
Ou opera	Ouju (甌劇)	Wenzhou (southern Zhejiang)
Fujian and Taiwan
Min opera	Minju (閩劇)	Fujian, Taiwan (particularly Matsu Islands), Southeast Asia
Beilu opera	Beiluxi (北路戲)	Shouning County (northeastern Fujian)
Pingjiang opera	Pingjiangxi (平講戲)	Ningde (northeastern Fujian)
Sanjiao opera	Sanjiaoxi (三角戲)	Northern Fujian, western Zhejiang, northeastern Jiangxi
Meilin opera	Meilinxi (梅林戲)	Northwestern Fujian
Puxian opera	Puxianxi (莆仙戲)	Putian (coastal central Fujian)
Liyuan opera	Liyuanxi (梨園戲)	Quanzhou (southern Fujian), Taiwan, Southeast Asia
Gaojia opera	Gaojiaxi (高甲戲)	Quanzhou (southern Fujian), Taiwan, Southeast Asia
Dacheng opera	Dachengxi (打城戲)	Quanzhou (southern Fujian)
Taiwanese opera	Gezaixi (歌仔戲)	Taiwan, southern Fujian, Southeast Asia
Hubei, Hunan, and Jiangxi
Flower-drum opera	Huaguxi (花鼓戲)	Hubei, Hunan, Anhui, southeastern Henan
Han opera	Hanju (漢劇)	Hubei, Hunan, Shaanxi, Taiwan
Chu opera	Chuju (楚劇)	Eastern Hubei
Jinghe opera	Jinghexi (荊河戲)	Southern Hubei, northern Hunan
Baling opera	Balingxi (巴陵戲)	Yueyang (northeastern Hunan)
Jiangxi opera	Ganju (贛劇)	Jiangxi
Yaya opera	Yayaxi (丫丫戲)	Yongxiu County (northern Jiangxi)
Meng opera	Mengxi (孟戲)	Guangchang County (eastern central Jiangxi)
Donghe opera	Donghexi (東河戲)	Ganzhou (southern Jiangxi)
Tea-picking opera	Caichaxi (採茶戲)	Jiangxi, Hunan, Guangxi, Hubei, Guangdong, Taiwan
Southwest China
Sichuan opera	Chuanju (川劇)	Sichuan, Chongqing
Yang opera	Yangxi (陽戲)	Northwestern Hunan, eastern Sichuan, Chongqing, Guizhou
Deng opera	Dengxi (燈戲)	Northeastern Sichuan, Chongqing, southwestern Hubei
Huadeng opera	Huadengxi (花燈戲)	Guizhou, Yunnan
Guizhou opera	Qianju (黔劇)	Guizhou
Yunnan opera	Dianju (滇劇)	Yunnan
Guansuo opera	Guansuoxi (關索戲)	Chengjiang County (central Yunnan)
South China
Cantonese opera	Yueju (粵劇)	Guangdong, Hong Kong, Macau, southern Guangxi, North America, Southeast Asia
Teochew opera	Chaoju (潮劇)	Eastern Guangdong, southernmost Fujian, Hong Kong, Southeast Asia
Zhengzi opera	Zhengzixi (正字戲)	Lufeng (eastern Guangdong)
Hakka opera	Hanju (漢劇)	Eastern Guangdong
Leizhou opera	Leiju (雷劇)	Leizhou Peninsula (southwestern Guangdong)
Hainan opera	Qiongju (瓊劇)	Hainan, Singapore
Zhai opera	Zhaixi (齋戲)	Haikou (northern Hainan)
Caidiao	Caidiao (彩調)	Guangxi
Guangxi opera	Guiju (桂劇)	Northern Guangxi
Nanning opera	Yongju (邕劇)	Nanning (southern Guangxi)

Recognize mutually (相認)
A Cantonese opera song by two female singers Yam Kim Fai and Bak sheut sin. Yam Kim Fai is actually using her trademark indistinguishable male voice behind the opera disguise. Only traditional Chinese instruments are used.

Eighteen miles away (十八相送)
A Huangmei opera song by Ivy Ling Po partnering with Jenny Tseng.

== Gallery ==
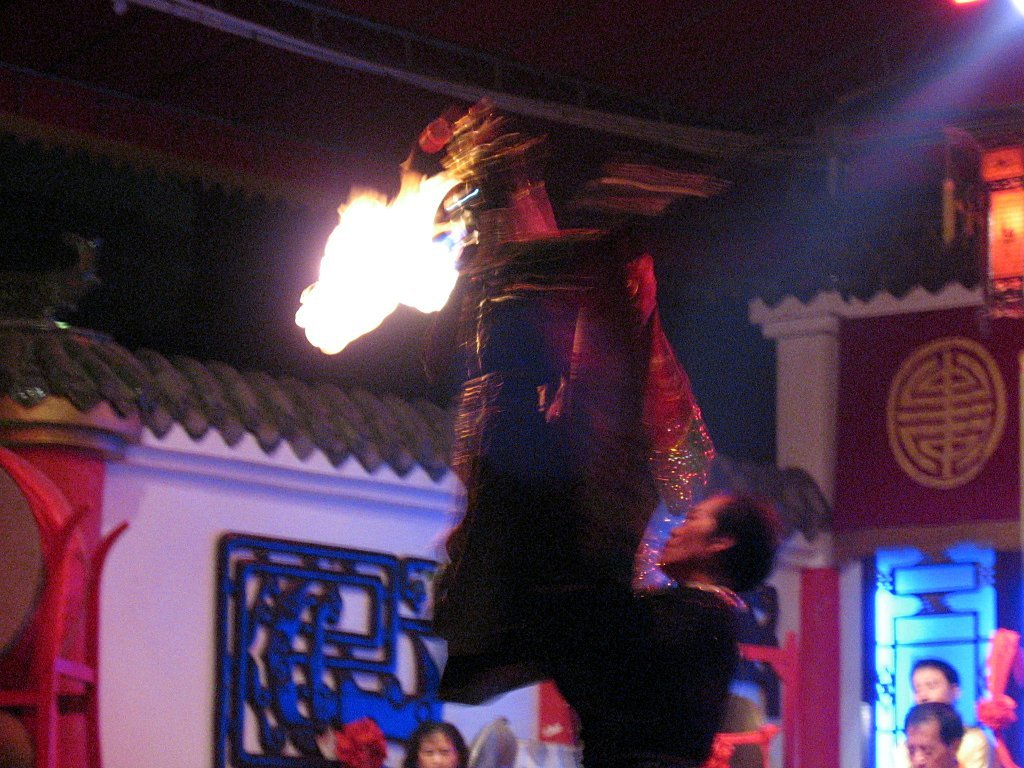
Fire spitting from Sichuan opera

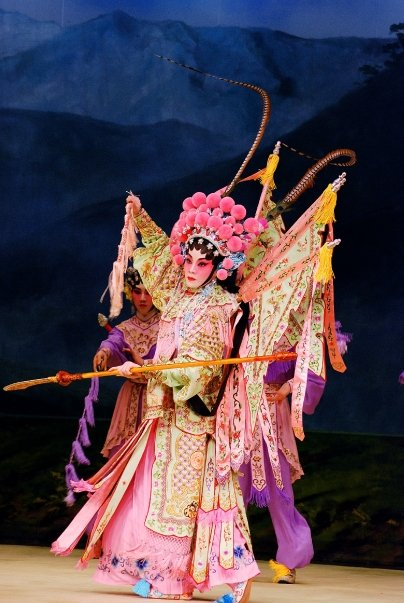
A female opera performer

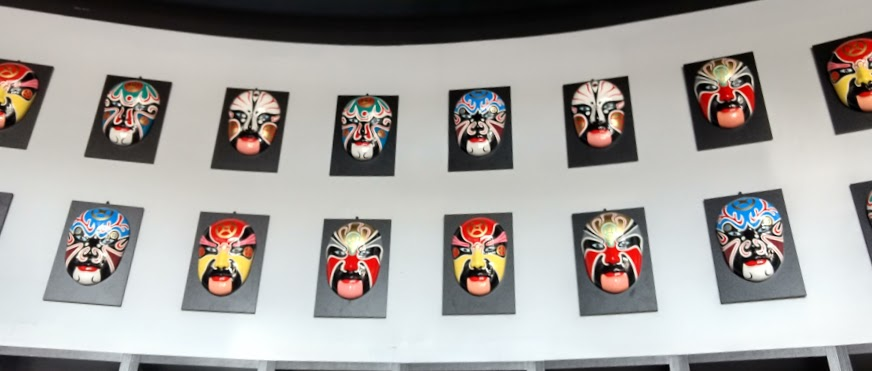
The mask of Chinese opera.

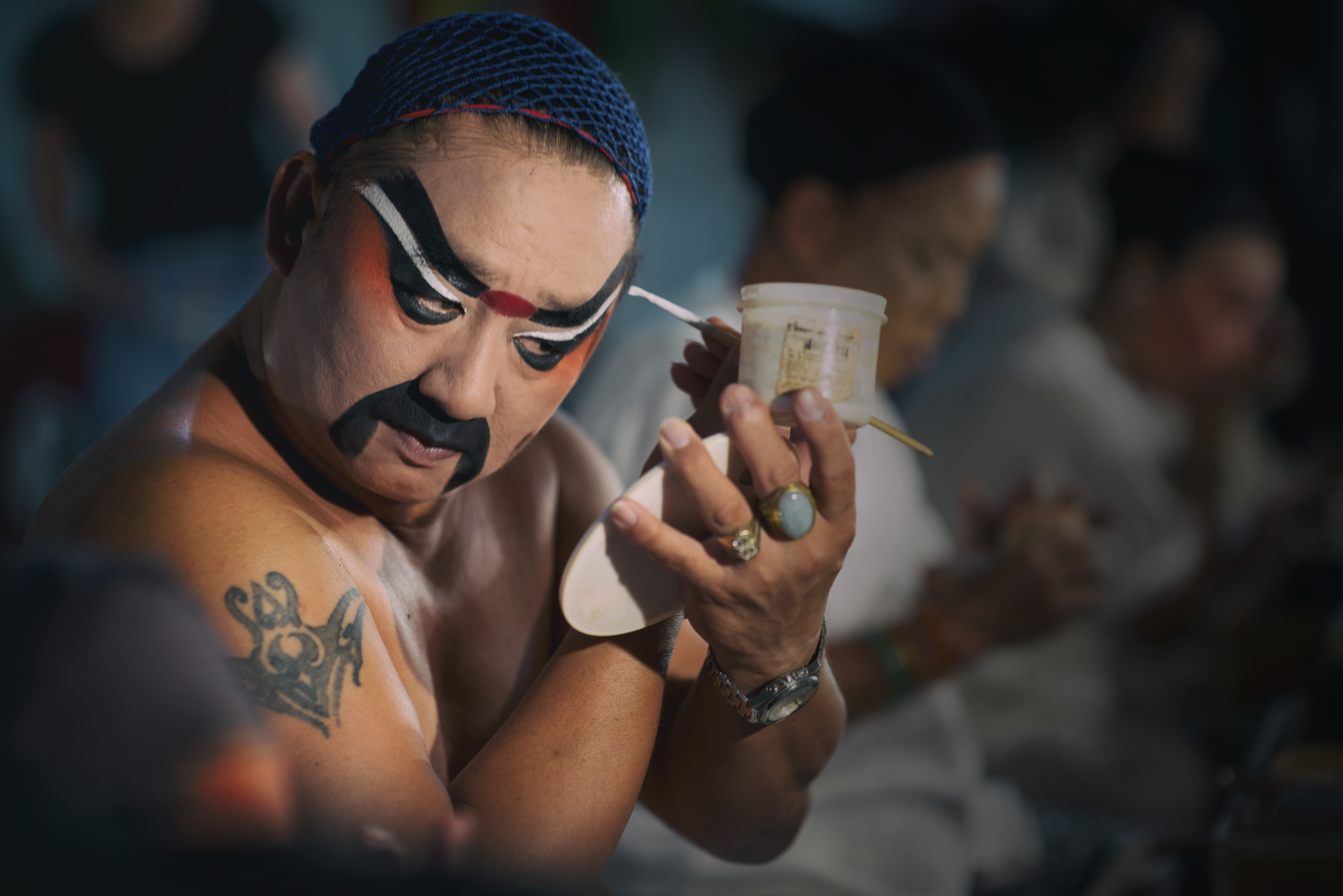
A man is painting Chinese opera makeup.

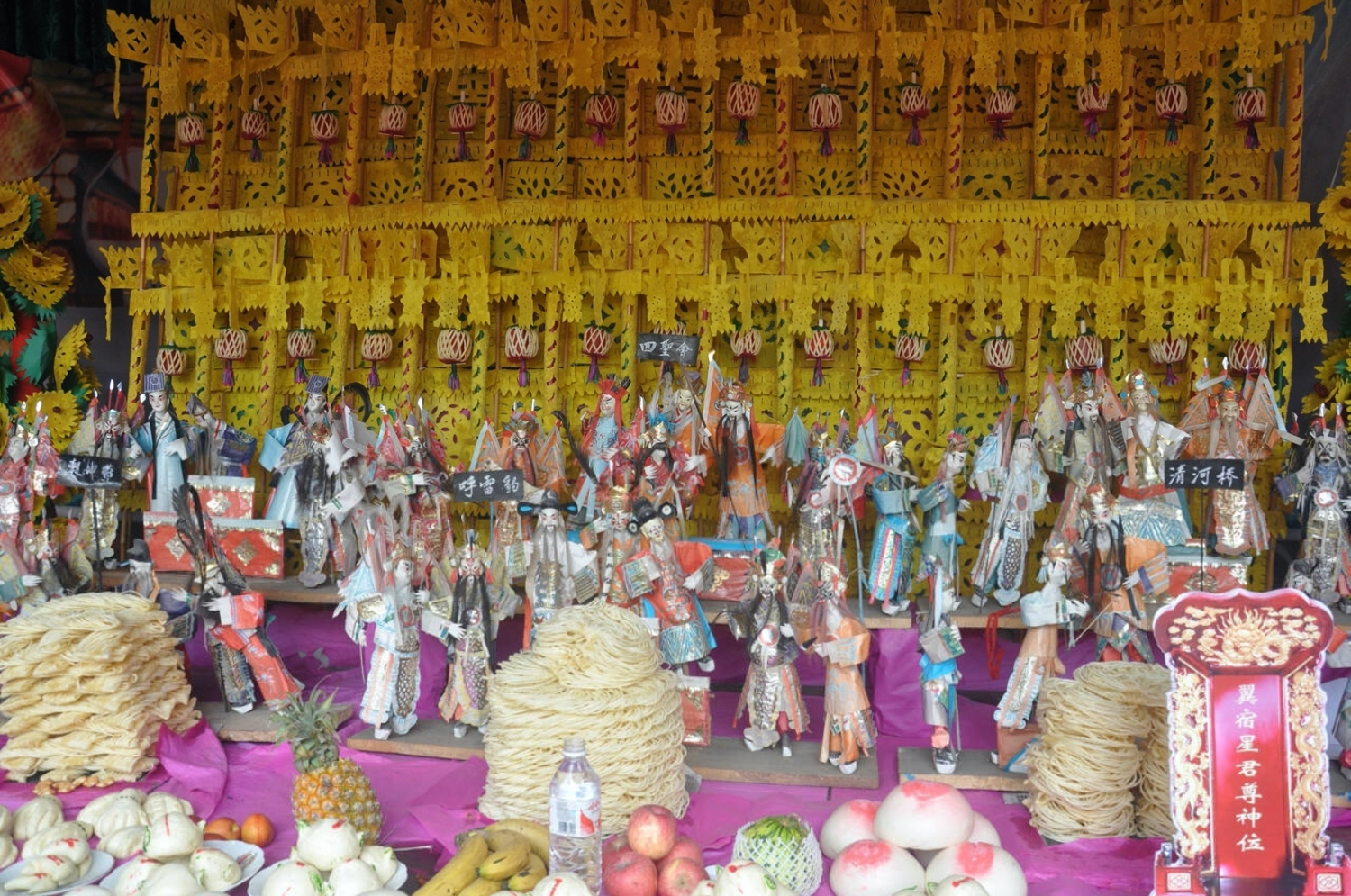
Models of Chinese opera figures used as offerings

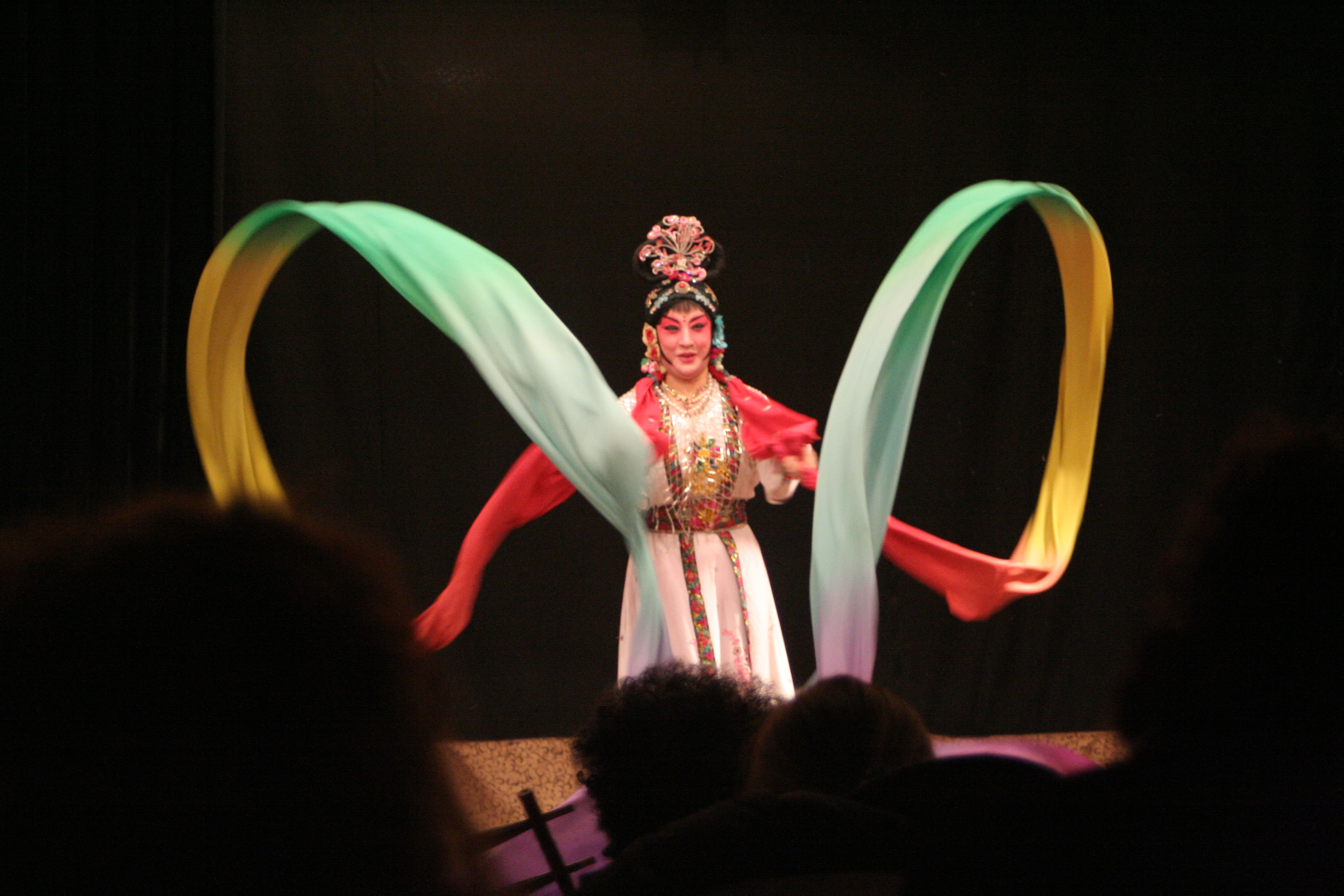
Water sleeve

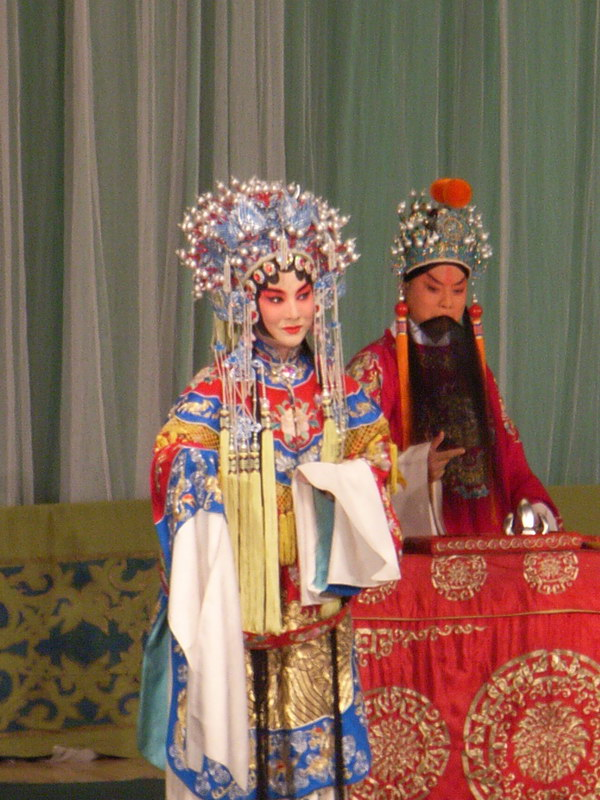
Classic Chinese opera look

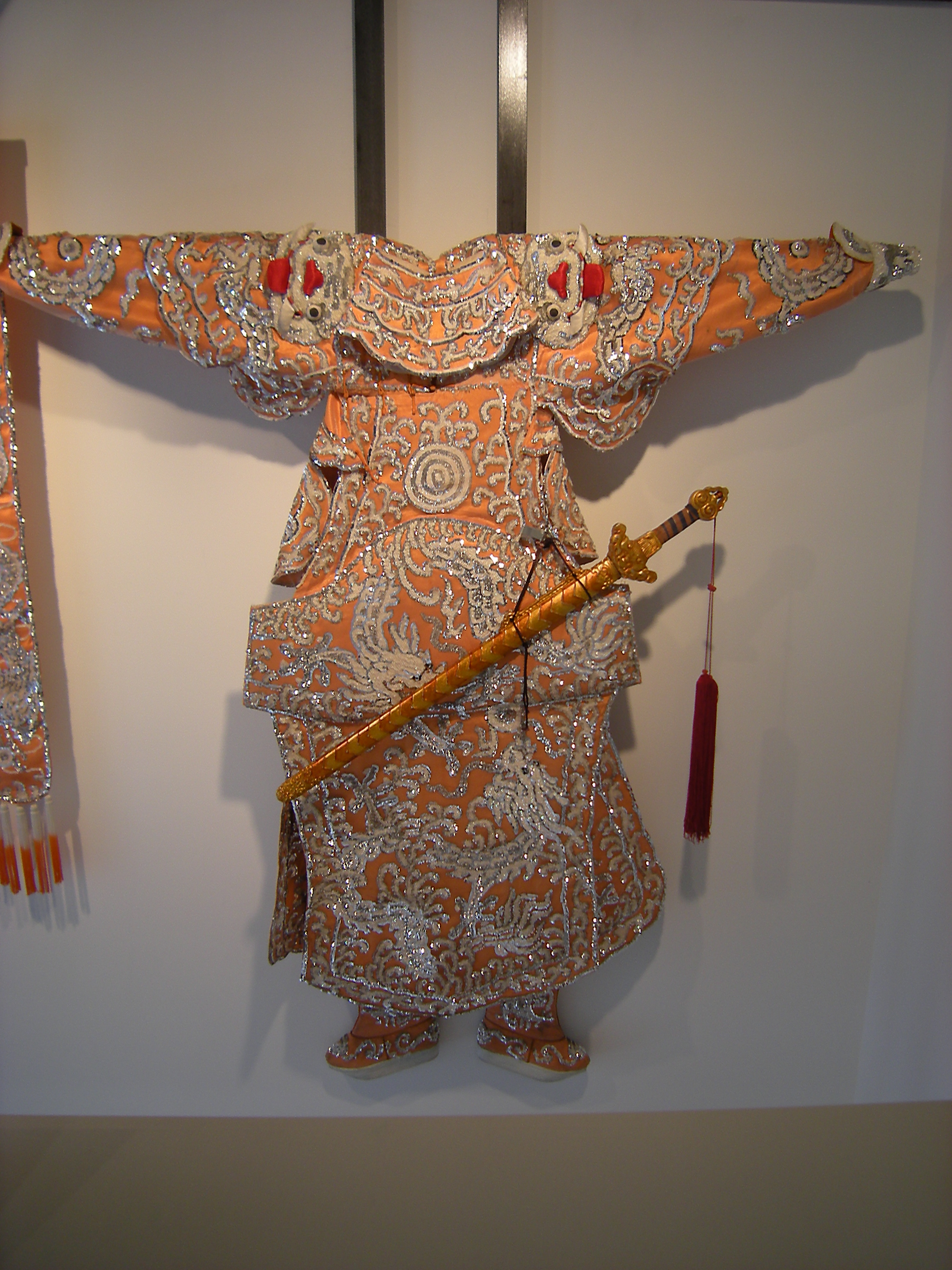
Wing Luke Museum – Ping Chow's Chinese opera garment

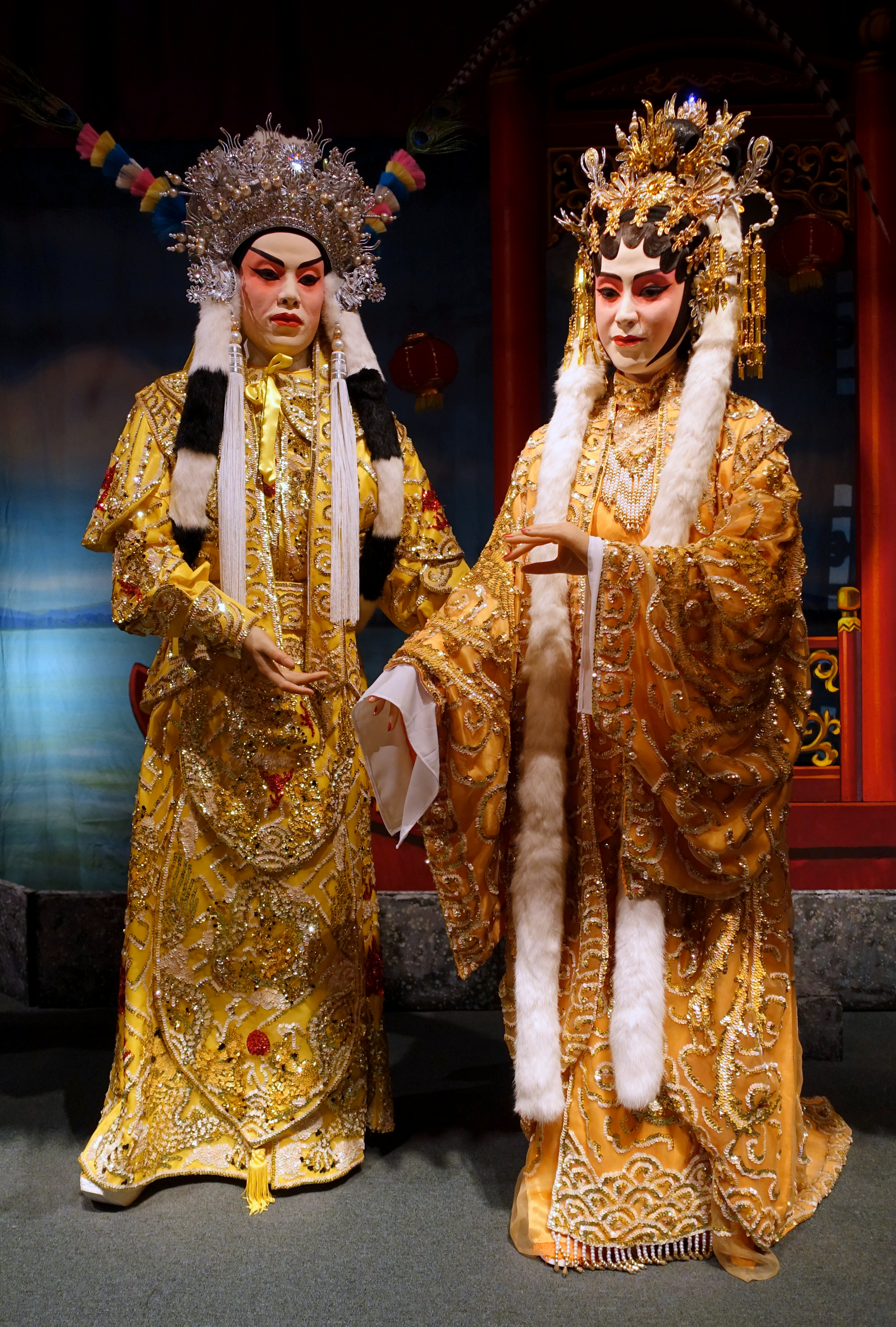
Chinese opera costumes – Hong Kong Museum of History

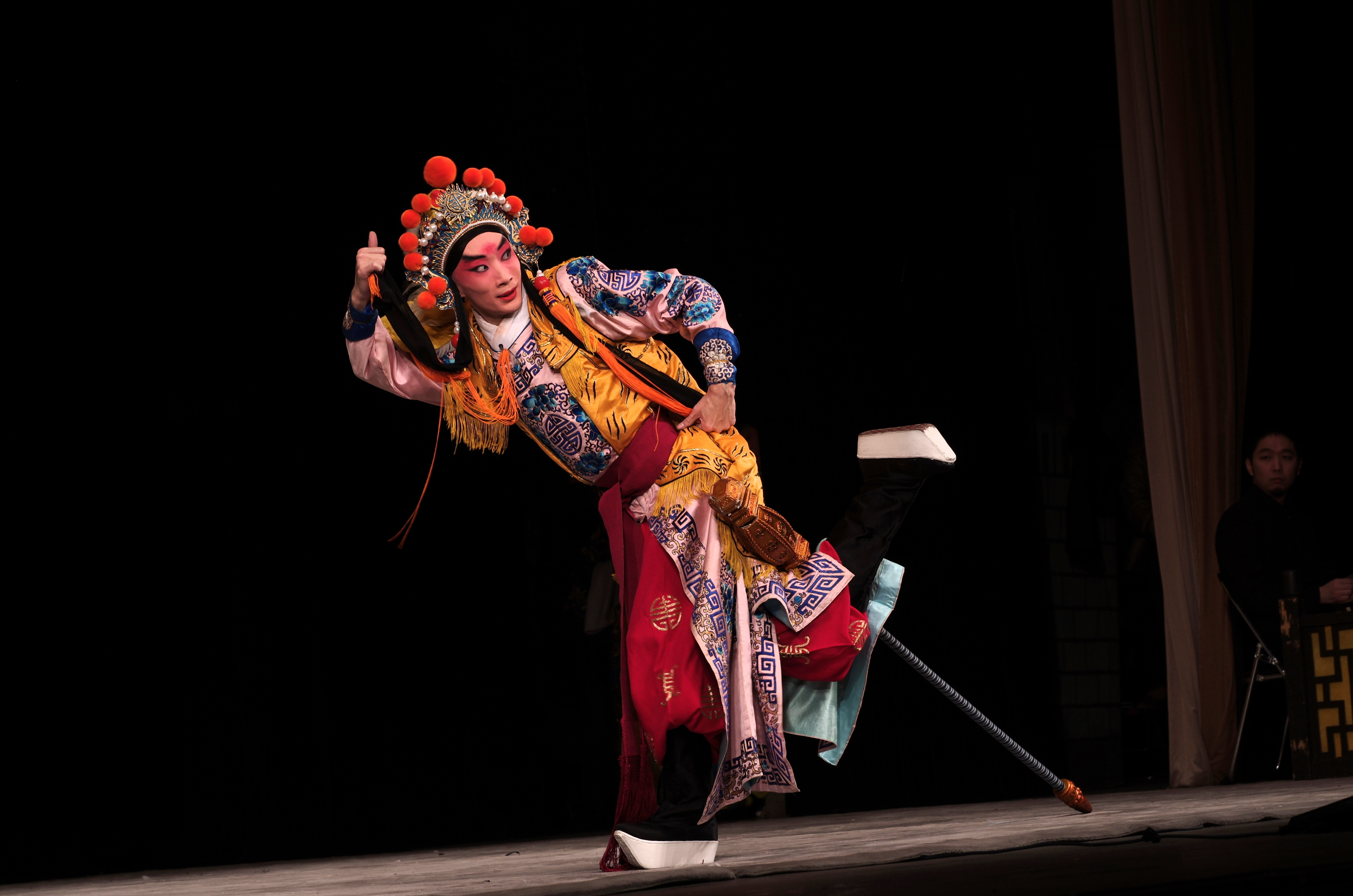
A Peking Opera actor

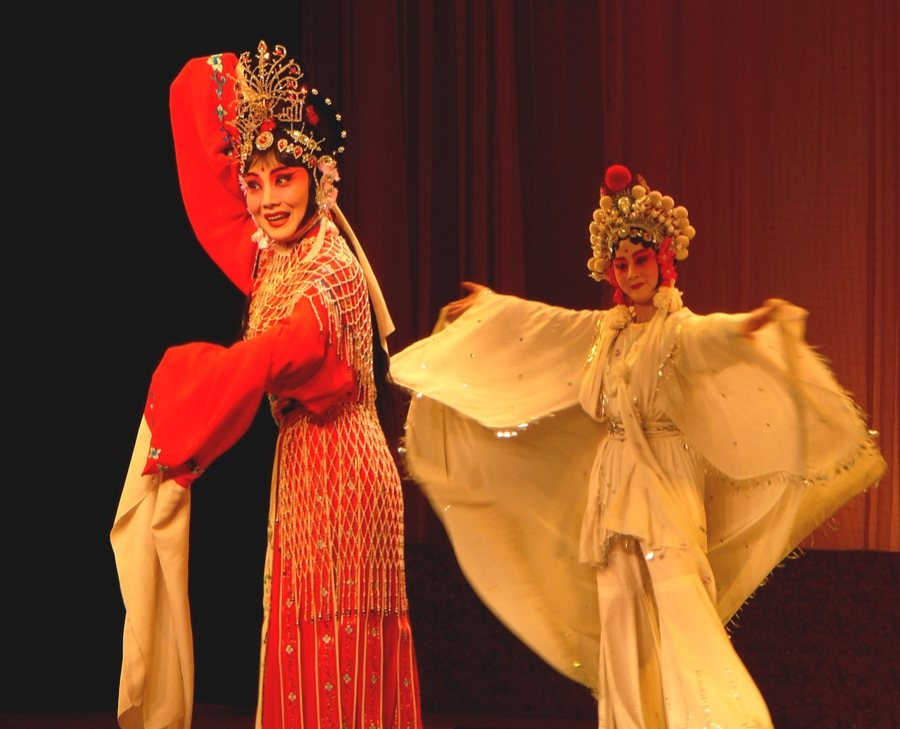
Two Beijing Opera actresses

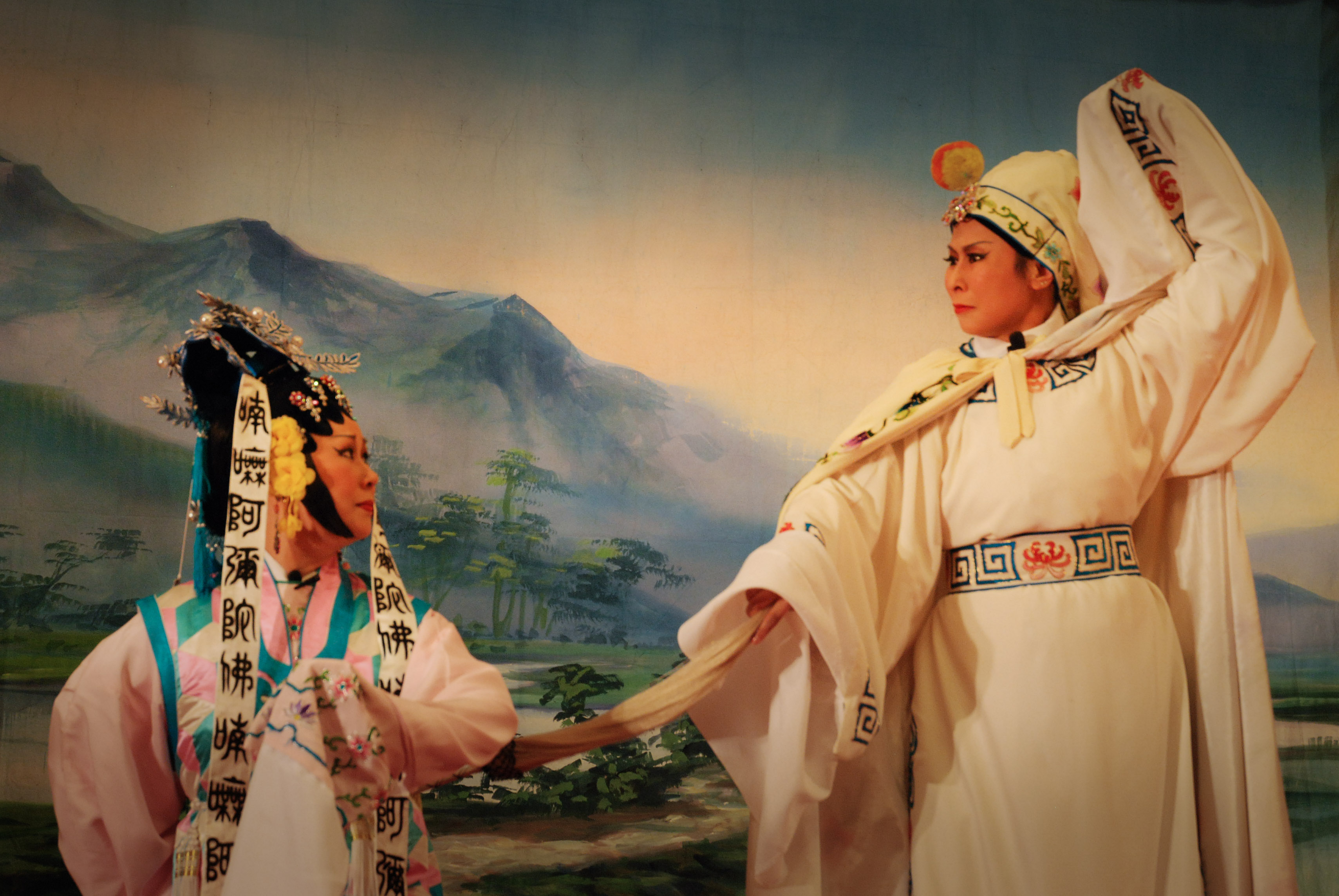
Chinese drama In last century.

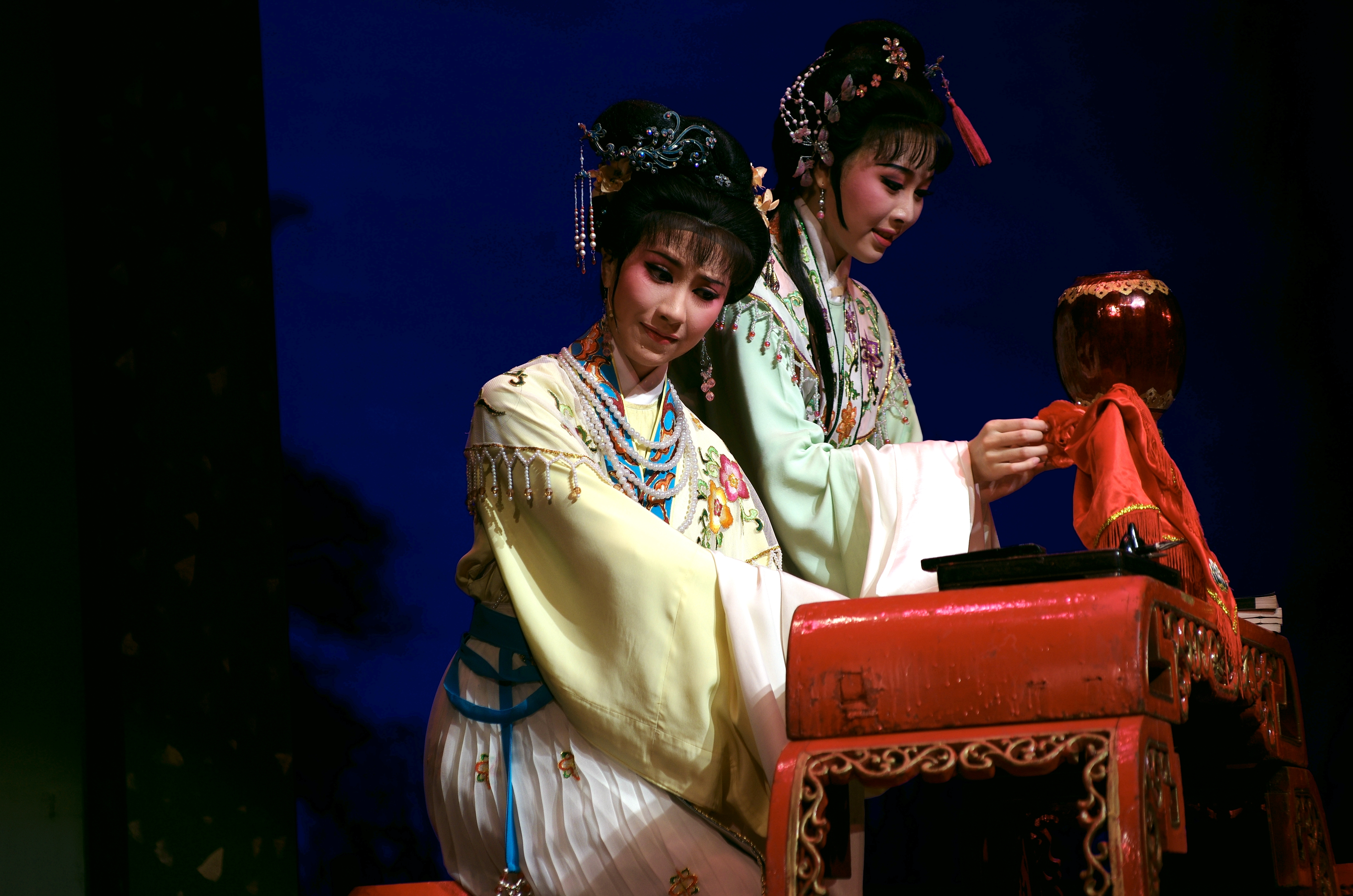
Romance of the Western Chamber Shaoxing opera

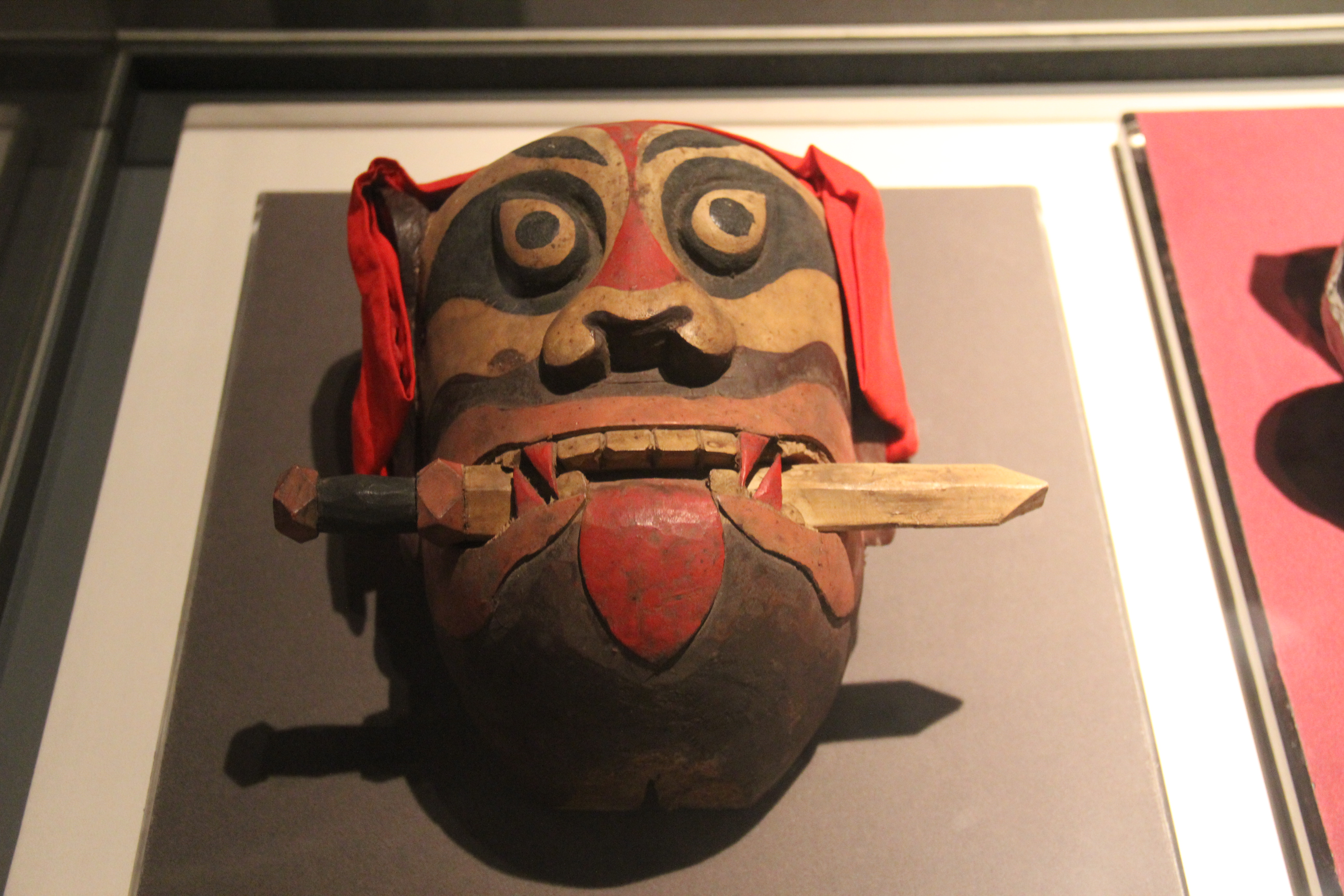
Nuo Opera Mask

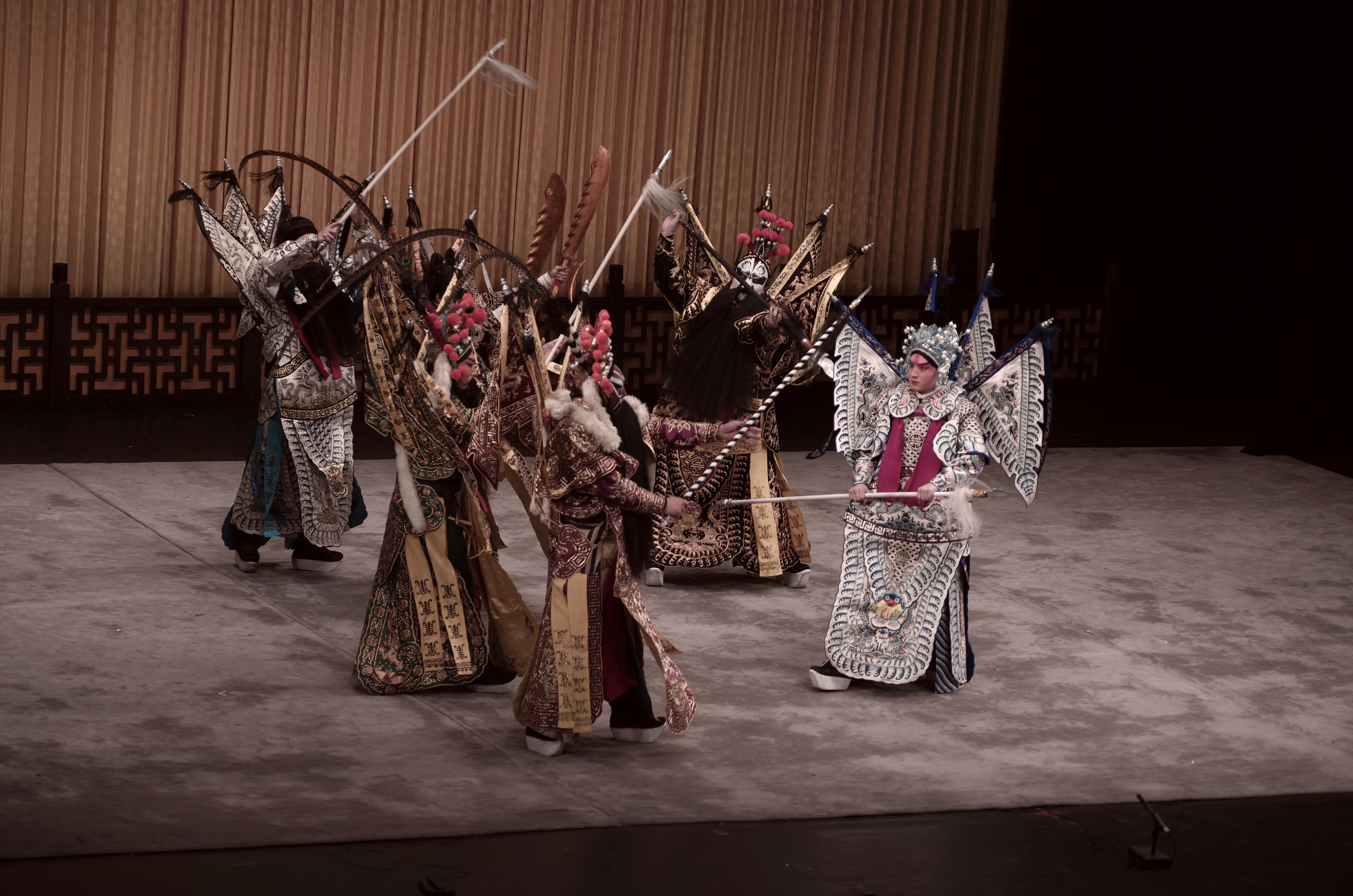
Battle of Changban Peking Opera

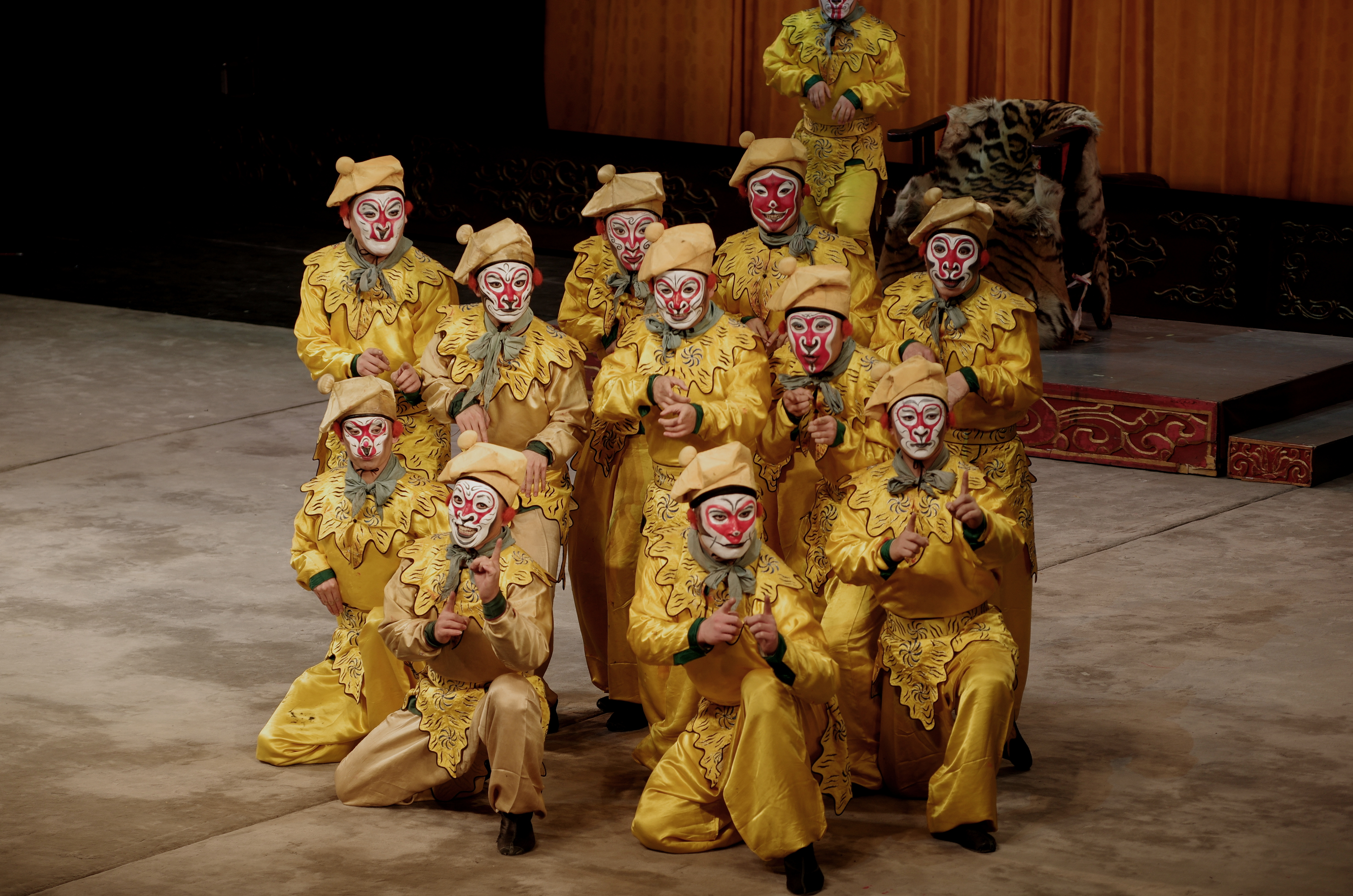
Havoc in Heaven Peking Opera

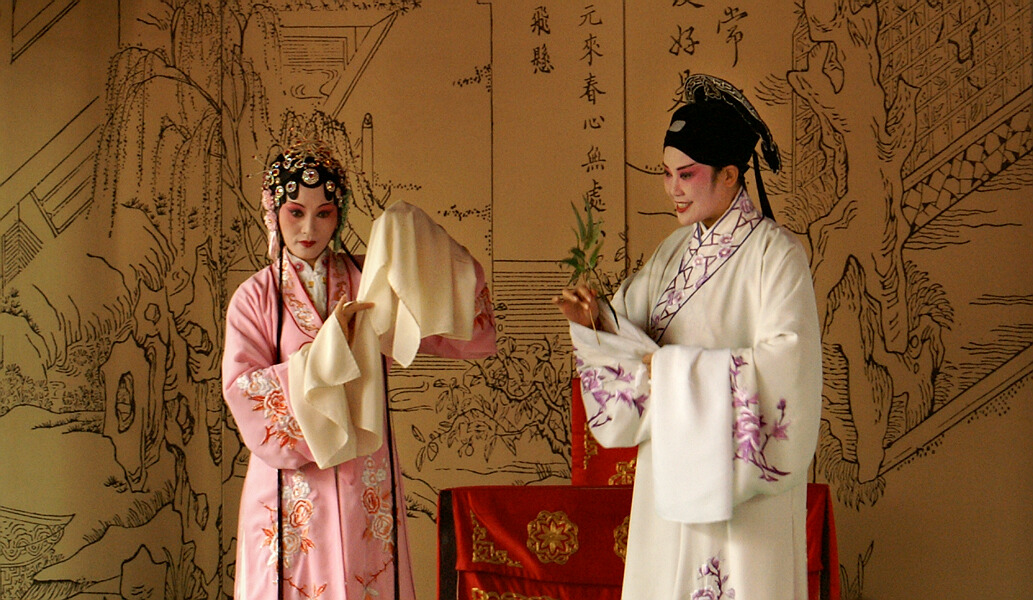
Kunqu Mudanting Scene

Kunqu

== In popular culture ==
The Peking opera subgenre is the focal point of the 1988 play M. Butterfly, in which a spy for the Chinese government disguises himself as a woman performer under the alias Song Liling and enters a 20-year relationship with French civil servant René Gallimard. The latter is unaware that female roles in Peking opera are actually played by men due to women being barred from the stage.

An update in January 2022 for the game Genshin Impact includes a story quest that features a musical number from the character Yun Jin that is in the style of Chinese opera. The Divine Damsel of Devastation, is an original work created by the game's developers, and went viral as it was the first time many people around the world have heard Chinese opera. Even Yang Yang, the Chinese voice of Yun Jin, was surprised about it.

In the 2022 film Everything Everywhere All at Once, one of Evelyn's multiverse counterparts became a prodigious Chinese opera singer after being blinded in a childhood accident. Evelyn assimilates this version's abilities to improve her self-confidence and breath control during a fight. Later in the film, the interaction between various multiverse versions of Evelyn result in the Chinese opera version botching and then salvaging a performance.

== See also ==
- Chinese contemporary classical opera
- Chinese Street Opera in Singapore
- Chinese theatre
- Chinese culture
- Chinese art
- C-pop
- Huaju
- Music of China
- Pear Garden
- Qu (poetry)
- Revolutionary opera
- Yuan poetry
- Zaju
