= Luju =

Luju or Lu Ju may refer to:

- Lu opera (庐剧), a Chinese opera form from central Anhui
- Lü opera (吕剧), a Chinese opera form from southwestern Shandong
- Luju, Yunnan (路居), a town in Yuxi, Yunnan, China
- Lü Ju (呂據) (died 256), Eastern Wu general
