= Pu opera =

- Native name: Puju
- Etymology: From Pu Prefecture (Puzhou)
- Other names: Puzhou clapper opera
- Chinese: 蒲州梆子
- Hanyu Pinyin: Púzhōu bāngzǐ
- Major region: Southern Shanxi (area around Yuncheng)
- Typical instruments: Banhu; Dizi; Erguxian; Sanxian; Erhu
- Topolect: Mandarin Chinese (Central Plains Mandarin)
- Tune system: Bangzi

Chinese name
- Traditional Chinese: 蒲劇
- Simplified Chinese: 蒲剧
Transcriptions
Standard Mandarin
- Hanyu Pinyin: Pújù

Pu opera, also known as Puzhou clapper opera, is a variety of Chinese opera from southern Shanxi, China. It is closely related to qinqiang.

It is a very old art form, and makes use of very wide linear intervals.
