= Shanxi opera =

Genre of Chinese opera

Jin Opera
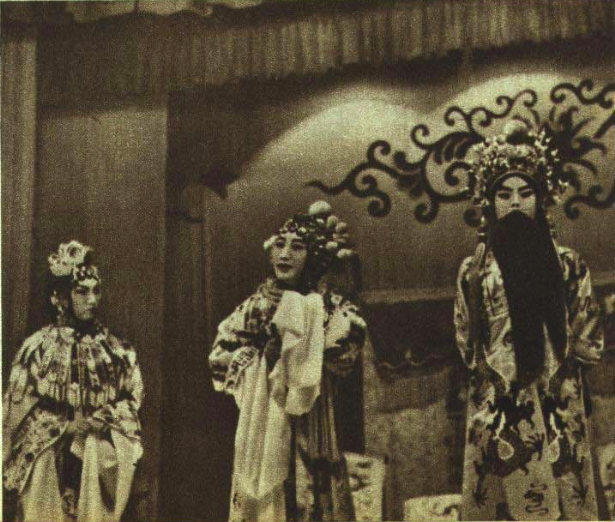
- Beating the Golden Branch (打金枝), a Shanxi Opera performance, 1952
- Branch: Chinese opera
- Years active: Qing dynasty – present (18th century – present)
- Location: Shanxi Province, central China; also Inner Mongolia, Hebei, Shaanxi
- Influences: Puzhou Bangzi (蒲州梆子), Qinqiang (秦腔)
- Influenced: Inner Mongolian opera traditions

Shanxi opera
- Traditional Chinese: 晉劇
- Simplified Chinese: 晋剧
Transcriptions
Standard Mandarin
- Hanyu Pinyin: Jìnjù
- Wade–Giles: Chin^{4}-chü^{4}

Shanxi opera, officially Jin opera, is the most prominent form of Chinese opera form in the province of Shanxi. Jin opera is one of the four great operatic traditions of Shanxi, along with Pu opera, Beilu clapper opera 北路梆子, and Shangdang clapper opera 上党梆子. Shanxi opera developed in central Shanxi during the Qing dynasty, by incorporating local rice-planting song styles into Puju, a related genre from southern Shanxi. In the early 20th century, the popularity of Shanxi opera spread into other provinces like Hebei, Shaanxi, Gansu, and Inner Mongolia, thanks to the dominance of Shanxi merchants in Chinese trade.

Male roles are usually played by women.
