= Yuju =

Yuju may refer to:

- Henan opera, a Chinese opera form
- Yuju (singer), South Korean singer
- You Province, known in Korean as Yuju, a province in Chinese history which administered parts of North Korea and Manchuria in some periods
