= Longjiang opera =

Longjiang opera (Chinese: 龙江剧) is one of the newest forms of Chinese opera. Its music is based on the tune of Errenzhuan and Lachangxi (拉场戏), and absorbed some Dongbei folk music styles. It was named as Longjiang opera officially in August 1960.
