= Shengqiang =

Vocal system in Chinese opera

Shengqiang (simplified Chinese: 声腔; traditional Chinese: 聲腔; lit. 'vocal tune') is a concept in Chinese opera which helps to categorize its hundreds of regional genres by the music played during arias. Classifying by the music, as opposed to the regional dialect, also helps to understand a genre's evolutionary history. For example, Peking opera and Cantonese opera have little in common as far as language or place of origin, but they belong to the same shengqiang system. Today, the four major shengqiang (四大声腔 pinyin: Sìdà Shēngqiāng) are Bangziqiang, Pihuangqiang, Kunqiang and Gaoqiang (i.e. Yiyangqiang). Not all Chinese opera genres fall into one of these four shengqiang systems, and many genres can be classified into more than one system. Other shengqiang in history include Yuyaoqiang and Haiyanqiang.

== Bangzi qiang ==
Bangziqiang (梆子腔) consists of Qinqiang (秦腔), Yu opera (豫剧), Jinju (晋剧), Hebei Bangzi (河北梆子), Sixianqiang in Dianju (滇剧的丝弦腔), Tanxi in Chuanju (川剧的弹戏), etc.

== Pihuang qiang ==
Pihuang qiang (皮黄腔, a coinage made from xipi and erhuang) comprises Huiju (徽剧 Hui theatre), Hanju (汉剧), Beijing opera (京剧), Cantonese opera (粤剧), Xiangju (湘剧), Chuanju (川剧), Dianju (滇剧), etc.

== Kun qiang ==
Kunqiang (崑腔), also known as Kunshanqiang (崑山腔), or Kunqu (崑曲) was listed as one of the Masterpieces of the Oral and Intangible Heritage of Humanity by UNESCO in 2001.

== Yiyang qiang (Gao qiang) ==
Yiyang qiang (弋陽腔) or outside Peking called Gao qiang (高腔) consists of Teochew opera (潮剧), Sichuan opera (川剧), Xiangju (湘剧 also in Pihuangqiang), Ganju (赣剧), Dianju (滇剧 again also in Pihuang qiang), Chenhexi (辰河戏), Diaoqiang (调腔), etc.
