= Tongzi opera =

Regional form of Chinese opera

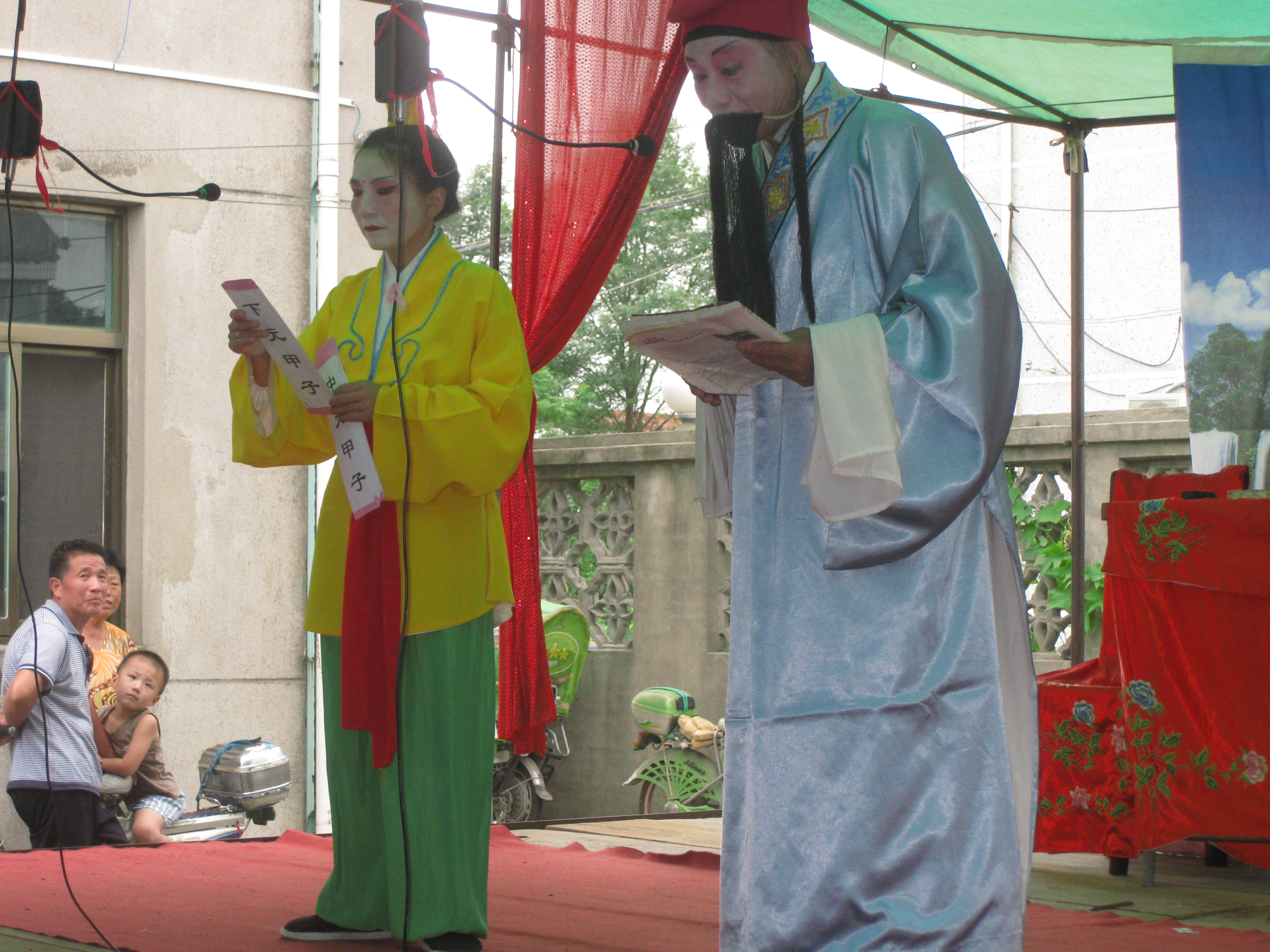
- Tongzi opera in 2011
- Native name: Tongzixi (童子戏 or 僮子戏)
- Etymology: tongzi, a type of wu (shaman)
- Major region: Area around Nantong and Lianyungang, Jiangsu
- Topolect: Jianghuai Mandarin

Tongzi opera
- Traditional Chinese: 童子戲 or 僮子戲
- Simplified Chinese: 童子戏 or 僮子戏
Transcriptions
Standard Mandarin
- Hanyu Pinyin: Tóngzǐ xì

Tongzi opera (Chinese: 童子戏 or 僮子戏; pinyin: Tóngzǐxì) is a regional form of Chinese opera popular in the rural areas of Nantong in southeastern Jiangsu province and Lianyungang in northeastern Jiangsu province. It is traditionally sung in local dialect and accompanied by gong and drum. The form resulted from the blending of a local religious activity called shang tongzi (Chinese: 上僮子; pinyin: shàng tóngzǐ) with theatre.

In 2008, Nantong's Tongzi Opera was included in the national intangible cultural heritage list.

In 2021, Lianyungang's Tongzi Opera was included in the national list of operas in danger.

== History ==
=== Origins ===
Its history can be traced back to the pre-Qin period.

Tongzi opera was born over 1000 years ago near the Yangzi River. At that time, economy and technology was not developed, the residents made a living by salt making and agriculture. Therefore, residents held Buddhist meetings every year to pray for good crop weather and bumper grain harvest which was called Shangtongzi. Thereafter more than 1000 years, it mixed together with the local dialect, the culture, the custom and the public sentiment which contributed to the embryonic form of Tongzi opera. In the end of the Qing dynasty, performers modified the lines, appeared on the stage with make-up, which contributed to its prototype. Formulated in Dongzhou and popular in the Tang dynasty.

In Lianyungang, Tongzi Opera also had long history. Its origin closely connected with Wu culture in China. After Ming and Qing Dynasty, it become more and more secular. In other words, it turns from making the God happy to making the population happy.

=== Development ===
After the founding of the People's Republic of China, performers went a step further to abandon some superstition contents, using its unique talking and singing form, adapted the Tongzi opera to modern opera, successfully transformed it into Nantong opera. After the reforming and opening up, some young performers were cultivated in the support of Nantong Culture Administration. With the rapid development of market economy, a number of folk performance teams sprang up. In recent years, the endangered Tongzi opera has received much more attention and concerns home and abroad. In 2008, it was included in the list of national intangible cultural heritage.

However, in Lianyungang, the protection on Tongzi Opera was not well guaranteed. It was at risk and waiting for further protection.
