= Yangzhou opera =

Traditional form of Chinese opera

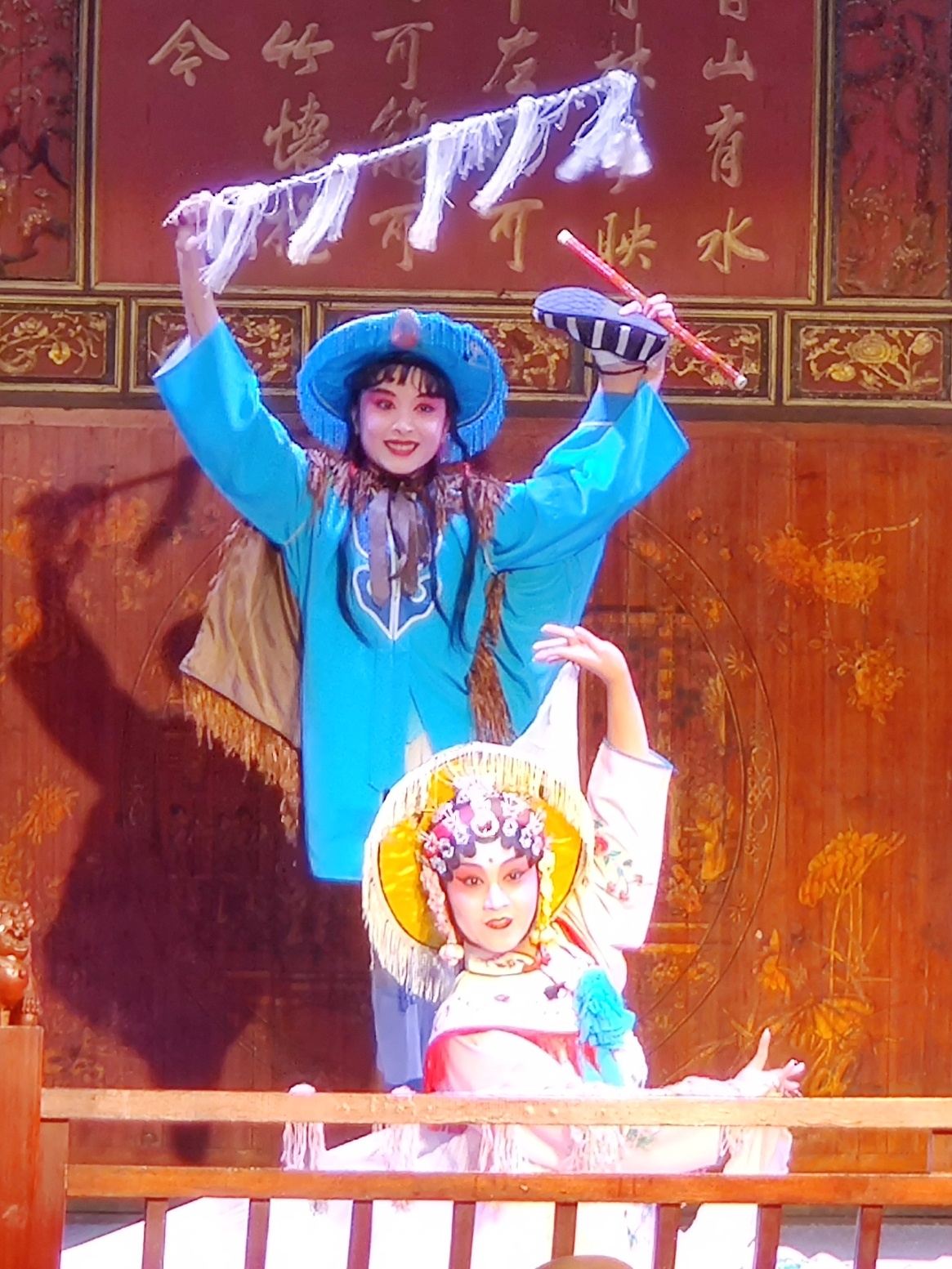
Yangzhou opera in Nanjing, 8 August 2019. The actress in blue is portraying a young boy.

Yangzhou opera (Chinese: 扬剧; pinyin: Yángjù; lit. 'Yang opera') is a form of Chinese opera from Yangzhou in Jiangsu province. Its popularity has spread to Zhenjiang and Nanjing in Jiangsu, as well as Shanghai and parts of Anhui province. It made the first national intangible cultural heritage list in 2006.

Its origins dates to the Kangxi Emperor's reign. In the beginning, it had only two character types, a clown (Chou role) and a woman (Dan role). It has more character types now, but still only two singing styles, male and female.
