= Jilin opera =

Jilin opera (Chinese: 吉剧, Pinyin: Jiju) is a form of Chinese opera, especially popular in Jilin province, China. Compared to Kun opera or Beijing opera, it is played in modern Mandarin, similar to Pingju opera.

Jilin opera came into Beijing in the second half of the 20th century, during the Hundred Flowers Campaign. The Jilin Opera Troupe was established in 1960 in Changchun, the capital city of Jilin province. There is also the Jilin Opera House (Chinese: 吉林省吉剧院).
