= Lu opera =

Variety of Chinese opera from the east-central province of Anhui, China

- Traditional Chinese: 廬劇
- Simplified Chinese: 庐剧
Transcriptions
Standard Mandarin
- Hanyu Pinyin: lú jù

Luju or Lu opera (Chinese: 庐剧; pinyin: Lú jù, formerly known as daoqixi (倒七戏), is a variety of Chinese opera from the east-central province of Anhui, China. Luju's name came from the former name of Hefei, Lu Zhou. In 2006, Luju was regarded as Intangible cultural heritage in China.

== Artistic characteristics ==
The aria of Luju consists of two main types, homophony and coloratura. Homophony is for narrating and coloratura is for operetta. A lot of falsetto is used in the aria. In some occasion, artists on the stage or backstage would sing together to exaggerate the atmosphere.

The instruments played in Luju are gongs, drums and Gaohu, etc. The performing approaches of Luju draw on the experience of other Chinese operas, such as Peking opera and Huiju.

== Genres ==
Because of regional characteristics, Luju can be divided into three genres: West Road Genre, Middle Road Genre and East Road Genre. Lu'an is the center of West Road Genre. This genre has a more resounding music. Hefei is the center of Middle Road Genre. It's a combination of the west and east genre. Wuhu is the center of East Road Genre which is exquisite and sweet.

== History ==
The birth year of Luju is inconclusive yet, but it can date back to the middle of Qing dynasty. In early years, artists in Luju were less professional, and their actings were simpler. Singing was the most important way to portray characters. From 1920, Luju has been absorbing advantages of other Chinese operas and becoming more mature.

== Famous people ==
Famous Luju players are 黄冰, 武克英, and 丁玉兰, etc.

== Organization ==
Active Luju organizations are 合肥市庐剧院 and 皖西庐剧团.
