= Lü opera =

Chinese opera variety

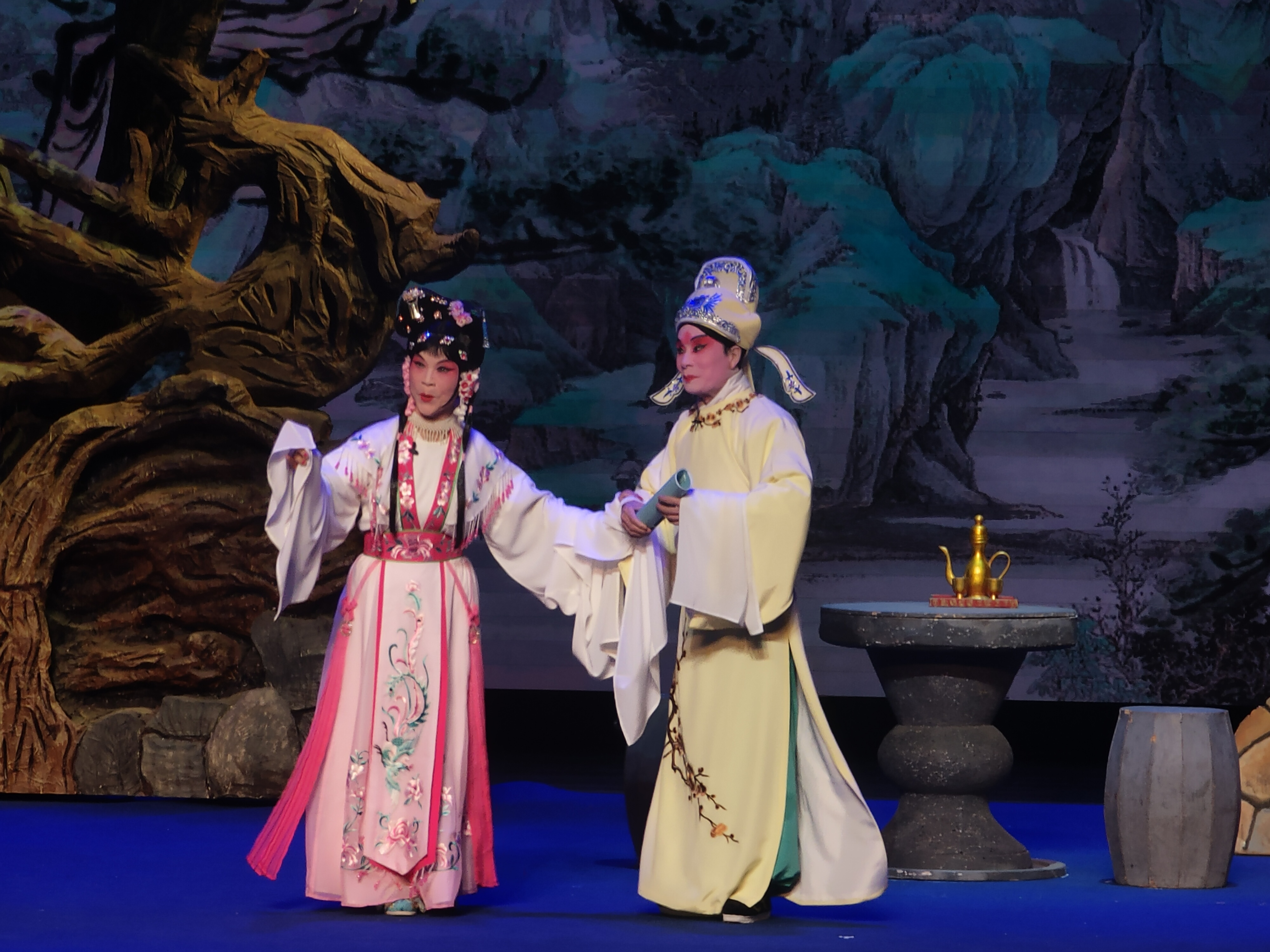
Lü opera being played in Zibo

Lüju (吕剧) is a variety of Chinese opera from the eastern province of Shandong, China. It originated in the southwestern part of the province.

In the middle of 2016, the government of Dongying invested in the construction of the Lüju Opera Museum.

There are several theories about how this form of opera got its name.
