= Tea-picking opera =

Chinese opera genre

A Tea-picking opera (traditional Chinese: 採茶戲; simplified Chinese: 采茶戏; pinyin: Cǎichá Xì) is a form of musical entertainment.

It originally derived from the tea-growing region around Mount Jiulong in the South of Jiangxi Province in China, where the tea pickers would sing lengthy songs to each other whilst undertaking the monotonous task of tea-picking. The songs were often in three parts with different groups of pickers, singing different parts. These folk songs were gradually adopted by performing troupes of singers and eventually became known as Tea picking operas.

In Taiwan, the Hakka people have a form called the "Hakka Tea-picking Opera" (客家採茶戲).

Huangmei opera originates from the tea-picking song around Huangmei County, Hubei.

== Further References ==
- Wang, Ying-fen (2000). "Taiwan: From Innocence to Funny Rap". In Broughton, Simon; Ellingham, Mark (eds.). World Music. Volume 2, Latin and North America, Caribbean, India, Asia and Pacific. London: Rough Guides. pp. 235–40. ISBN 9781858286365.
