= Zhengzi opera =

Chinese traditional stage art

Zhengzi opera (Chinese: 正字戲), also called Zhengzixi, is a very old traditional Chinese stage art that comes from Guangdong province. It uses ancient official speech sounds from past dynasties, keeping alive unique music, old words, and classic acting styles from hundreds of years ago.

== Origin ==
There are several theories regarding the origins of Zhengzi Opera. However, modern scholarship generally agrees that Zhengzi Opera originated in the early Ming Dynasty when a branch of Southern Opera (南戲) was introduced to eastern Guangdong. This ancient art form was initially called Zhengyin Opera (正音戲) and was mainly rooted in the Hailufeng area (now Shanwei City). It is a rare, multi-layered theatrical genre that has been passed down for over 600 years.

=== Ming dynasty ===
Zhengzi Opera employs the Zhongzhou official dialect, also known as Central Plains Mandarin (中州官話, which is not the same as modern Mandarin), reading tradition in its singing and recitation. It is an ancient and rare multi‑vocal genre of Chinese theatre. A branch of early‑Ming Nanxi was introduced into eastern Guangdong, where it developed into what is now called Zhengzi Opera, taking firm root in the Hailufeng region. From there it later spread to Hong Kong, Macau, Taiwan, and various parts of Southeast Asia.

=== Qing dynasty ===
During the Qing dynasty, Zhengzi opera reached its artistic maturity and peak commercial expansion, solidifying its footprint across southern China. While it maintained its elite status by singing in the Zhongzhou official dialect, the genre actively adapted to the shifting theatrical landscape of the era.

=== Modern Times ===
In June 2006, Zhengzi Opera was included in the first batch of national intangible cultural heritage list by the State Council of China.

== Artistic features ==
In Zhengzi Opera, martial plays are bold, vigorous, unrestrained, and graceful in their physicality, while civil plays are refined and delicate, combining elegance with popular appeal. Together they preserve the rich performance tradition of Nanxi, in which singing and movement are closely integrated.

The vocal and instrumental resources of Zhengzi Opera are remarkably diverse. In the Zhengyin repertoire, vocal styles such as Yiyangqiang and Yuyaoqiang are bright, resonant, and impassioned, conveying the upright and heroic qualities of martial characters. By contrast, the Qingyangqiang, Haiyanqiang, and Sipingqiang used in sheng‑dan roles are gentle, limpid, and lyrical, marked by a floating, expressive beauty. These ancient and richly colored vocal traditions embody the distinctive tonal qualities and aesthetic flavor of the southern Nanqu heritage.
