= Banhu =

Chinese musical instrument

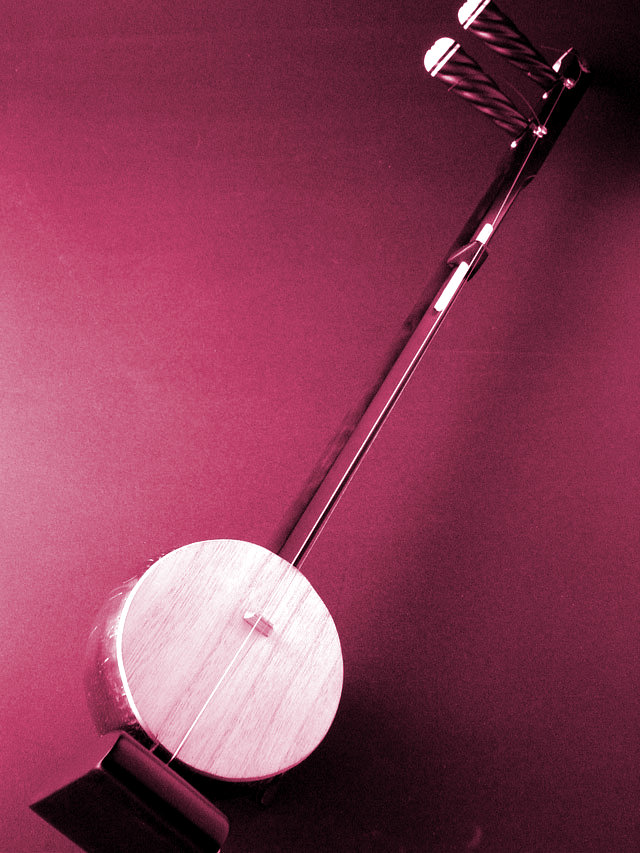
- A Banhu
- Other names: Banghu
- Classification: Bowed string instrument; Music in China
- Hornbostel–Sachs classification: 321.321-71

Related instruments
- Erhu (China); Gaohu (China); Yehu (China)

Sound sample

The banhu (Chinese: 板胡; pinyin: bǎnhú) is a Chinese traditional bowed string instrument in the huqin family of instruments. It is used primarily in northern China. Ban means a piece of wood and hu is short for huqin.

Like the more familiar erhu and gaohu, the banhu has two strings, is held vertically, and the bow hair passes in between the two strings. The banhu differs in construction from the erhu in that its soundbox is generally made from a coconut shell rather than wood, and instead of a snakeskin that is commonly used to cover the faces of huqin instruments, the banhu uses a thin wooden board.

The banhu is sometimes also called "banghu," because it is often used in bangzi opera of northern China, such as Qinqiang from Shaanxi province.

The yehu, another type of Chinese fiddle with a coconut body and wooden face, is used primarily in southern China.

== See also ==
- Huqin
- Yehu
- Music of China
- Traditional Chinese musical instruments
- Rebab
- String instruments
