= Hui opera =

Traditional Chinese opera

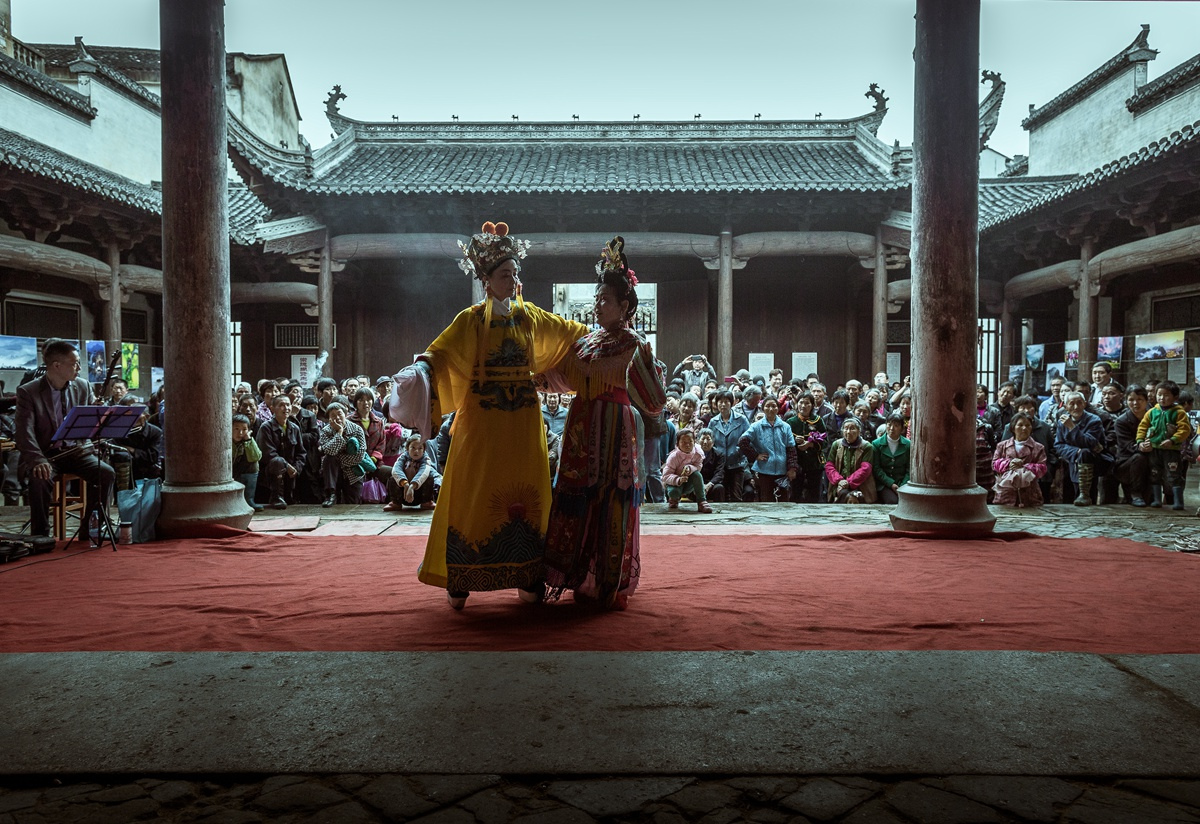
Hui opera, at Jiapeng Township, 2014

Anhui Opera, also known as Huiju [徽剧], is a traditional Chinese opera form that originated in Anhui Province during the Ming Dynasty. It is a crucial part of Huizhou culture and significantly contributed to the development of Peking Opera.

== History ==
Anhui Opera originated in the southern part of Anhui Province, particularly in Huizhou (now Huangshan City) and Anqing during the Ming Dynasty (1368–1644). It spread widely across China, influencing the formation of more than fifty other operatic styles, including Peking Opera. Its formation and early development came during the Ming Dynasty, and it played a part in developing Peking opera during the Qing Dynasty. It was revitalized under the modern People's Republic of China.

Anhui Opera played a pivotal role in the development of Peking Opera. The integration of Anhui Opera's melodies and performance styles significantly shaped the formation of this quintessential Chinese opera form. Anhui Opera influenced numerous other regional operatic forms, including Dianju, Cantonese Opera, Fujian Opera, Guiju, Hunan Opera, Ganju, Wuju, and Huaiju. Prominent figures and troupes within the movement include:

- Hou, Lu [侯露]: National First-Class Playwright, Vice Chairman, and Secretary General of the Anhui Dramatists Association. Anhui Opera scholar.
- Li, Taishan [李泰山]: A preeminent Anhui Opera artist and scholar.
- Wang, Danhong [王丹红]: National first-class actress and key performer in Anhui Opera.
- Wang, Yushu [汪育殊]: National first-class actor and key performer in Anhui Opera.
- Anhui Opera Troupe: Established in 1956, this troupe plays a crucial role in preserving and promoting Anhui Opera.

Anhui Opera faces challenges such as declining numbers of performers, lack of public awareness, and competition with modern entertainment forms. Efforts to preserve Anhui Opera include documentation of performances, training programs for young artists, and inclusion in cultural heritage lists by UNESCO and Chinese authorities. Recent government initiatives have focused on integrating Anhui Opera into school curriculums, supporting performances, and promoting cultural heritage through events and media.

== Characteristics ==
Anhui Opera is known for its diverse vocal tunes, including the Miscellaneous Tune, Huichi Elegant Tune, Huikun Tune, Siping Tune, Chuiqiang Tune, Bozi Tune, and Erhuang Tune. These tunes are performed with various traditional Chinese musical instruments. Character roles in Anhui Opera are categorized by gender, age, appearance, and social status. Common roles include:

- Sheng [生]: Male roles, including Laosheng (older men), Xiaosheng (young men), and Wusheng (martial men).
- Dan [旦]: Female roles, including Zhengdan (main female roles), Huadan (young women), Laodan (older women), and Wudan (martial women).
- Jing [净]: Roles with exaggerated facial makeup, typically representing heroes, villains, or characters with special traits.
- Chou [丑]: Clown roles, usually responsible for comedic effects, and can be either male or female.

Facial makeup in Anhui Opera is highly stylized, using vivid colors to represent different characters and emotions. The makeup helps to emphasize the character's personality and role within the story.
