= Henan opera =

Chinese opera genre

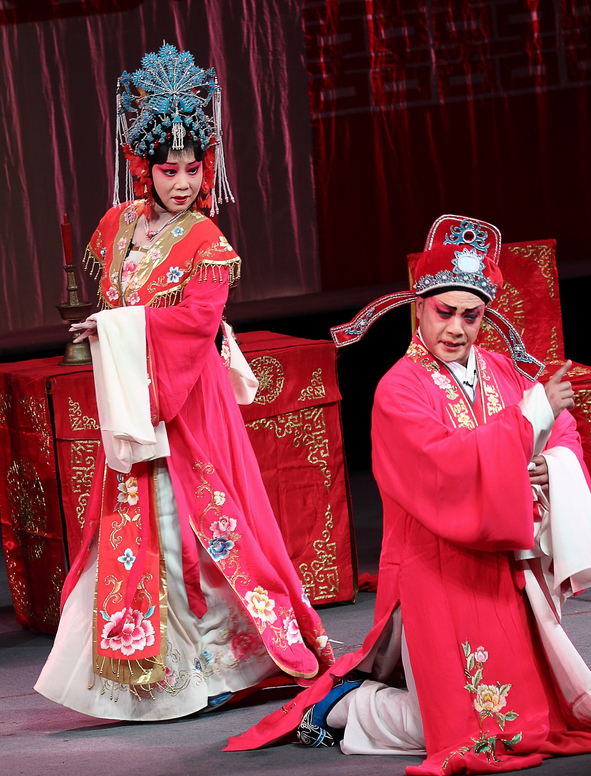
Yu performers

Yu opera or Yuju (simplified Chinese: 豫剧; traditional Chinese: 豫劇; pinyin: Yùjù), sometimes known as Henan bangzi (Note: "Bangzi" meaning wooden clappers with bars of unequal length) (河南梆子; Hénán Bāngzi), is one of China's famous national opera forms, alongside Peking opera, Yue opera, Huangmei opera and Pingju. Henan province is the origin of Yu opera. Henan's one-character abbreviation is "豫" (yù), and thus the opera style was officially named "豫剧" (Yùjù) after the founding of the People's Republic of China. The area where Yu opera is most commonly performed is in the region surrounding the Yellow River and Huai River. According to statistical figures, Yu opera was the leading opera genre in terms of the number of performers and troupes. While Yu opera is often called "Henan opera" in English, within Henan it is considered to be just one of the province's three most important forms of opera, the other two being Quju (曲剧) and Yuediao (越调).

Outside Henan, provinces and areas such as Hubei, Anhui, Jiangsu, Shandong, Hebei, Beijing, Shanxi, Shaanxi, Gansu, Qinghai, and Xinjiang all have professional Yu opera troupes. There is also a troupe in Kaohsiung, Taiwan. The history of Henan opera dates back to more than 200 years ago. The opera was widely spread in Henan province during the late Qing dynasty (1644–1911) and faced new development opportunities after the founding of the People's Republic of China in 1949. The opera spread across China and was ahead of the other 300 local operas in China before the mid-1980s. On May 20, 2006, Henan Opera was included in the first national intangible cultural heritage list batch.

== History ==
Yu opera came into being during the late Ming and early Qing dynasties. At the beginning, it was mainly song arias without make-up, which was loved by the ordinary people. As a result, it developed rapidly. The origin of Yu opera is hard to trace, and the accounts about its origin differ. With regard to the origin and formation of Henan opera, there is a shortage of records in ancient books, and few scholars have sought to engage in in-depth and comprehensive exploration and research.

Since the 1920s and 1930s there have been multiple theories and viewpoints on the origin of the opera. There is no one theory that is generally agreed upon by researchers as there is not enough evidence to convince all people, so there are multiple similar and completely opposite arguments. Four major representative opinions concerning the origin of the opera are that they originate from Shanxi opera, from the folk society of Henan, from the operatic tune that is popular in the Central Plains area of China, and from the predecessor of Henan bangzi.

== Henan Opera Art ==
=== Artistic characteristics ===
The art of Henan Opera is both ancient and modern, reconciliation hardness and softness, open-minded and generous, and has the beauty of "neutralization". Henan Opera is famous for singing. First of all, the Henan Opera singing is sonorous and powerful, magnificent, restrained, full of passionate and unrestrained masculinity, with strong emotional strength. Secondly, Henan Opera is sound, clear, natural, flesh and blood, and good at expressing the inner feelings of the characters. Moreover, the rhythm of Henan opera is distinct and strong, conflicts are sharp, and the story has a beginning and an end, coupled with humorous and cheerful tunes, which makes Henan opera not only suitable for performing easy comedy, it is also magnificent and suitable for playing emperors and generals of the big scene, western Henan euphemism, singing the sad is very suitable for playing sad drama. Henan Opera in the key plot is generally arranged with large plate singing, singing smooth, distinct rhythm, very challenging, generally clear words, easy to be heard by the audience, showing the unique charm of the Central Plains art.

=== Role ===
The role of Henan opera is composed of "Sheng Dan Jing Chou". Generally known as four sheng, four dan, and four painted faces. The organization's troupe is also four sheng, four dan, four painted faces, four soldiers, four generals, four maids, eight scenes, two boxes of officials, plus four handymen. The four are Zhengsheng, Ersheng, Xiao Sheng and Wu Sheng. Zhengsheng is also known as Hongsheng, Dasheng, and Dahongface; Ersheng is also known as two red faces, immediately red faces; Small born and then separated the baby born; Wu Sheng is also called Bian Sheng.

== Tune types ==
There are four major types of Yu opera. Xiangfu tune opera is heard around Kaifeng; Yudong tune in the Shangqiu area. Yuxi tune is heard around Luoyang, and the Shahe tune around Luohe. Yudong and Yuxi are the main forms, with Yudong expressing comedy and Yuxi expressing tragedy. During the late Qing dynasty (1644–1911), Henan bangzi greatly expanded in Henan. Owing to different living habits, language characteristics, natural environment, cultural psychology, and aesthetic tastes, Henan bangzi changed from the repertoire to operatic tune in different regions of Henan. Therefore, four main tune types of Henan opera formed. The four types are centered on different regions in Henan province.

== Famous people ==
The most famous Henan opera actors and actresses are Chang Xiangyu, Chen Suzhen, Cui Lantian, and Ma Jinfeng. Besides the four actresses mentioned, there are also some well-known actors such as Zhao Yiting, Tang Xicheng, and Li Sizhong.

Zhao Yiting (1995–1992), a member of the Chinese Theatre Association and director of the Henan Theatre Association. His artistic career spans more than 60 years and has made outstanding contributions to the theatrical career. He is an important figure in the history of Henan opera.

Tang Xicheng (1924–1993), a member of the Chinese Theatre Association, director of the Henan Theatre Association. The achievements of his artistic achievements contributed to the highest peak of the male character in Henan opera and Mr. Tang is a master of Henan opera.

Li Sizhong (1921–1996), a famous master of the Henan opera, the representative of the Heilian performer ("male character with darkish painted face") of Henan Opera.

== Status quo and suggested solutions ==
As an important local opera genre among the numerous non-material cultural heritage related Chinese operas, however, Henan opera are facing a hard situation on the protection and development. As many other local operas, the future of Henan Opera is worrying due to the influence of commodity economy and the impact of modern lifestyles. The number of plays and urban audience has reduced, and the rural audience is dominated by the elderly. As for suggestions to improve the hard situation, Henan opera can establish a mutual benefit with tourism resource to appeal more audience. At the same time, the exploration and research of Henan opera materials can be enriched, the investment in the development of Henan opera can be increased, and the productization of Henan Opera tourism meets the need of the times. There are some specific strategies such as strengthening the tourism propaganda of Henan opera, building the characteristic brand of Henan opera culture, developing the Henan opera tourism experience project, holding the Henan opera festival, Cultivating the new force of Henan opera tourism, and exploring various development model of Henan opera tourism.
