= Lists of theatres =

This is a list of theatre list articles on Wikipedia. Theatre or theater is a collaborative form of fine art that uses live performers to present the experience of a real or imagined event before a live audience in a specific place. The performers may communicate this experience to the audience through combinations of gesture, speech, song, music, and dance. Elements of design and stagecraft are used to enhance the physicality, presence and immediacy of the experience.

== By city ==
- List of theatres in Bangkok
- List of theatres and concert halls in Barcelona
- List of theatres in Budapest
- List of theatres in Bristol
- List of theaters in Chicago
- List of theatres in Hamburg
- List of former theatres in London
- List of theatres and entertainment venues in Lyon
- List of theatres in Munich
- Early theatres in Naples
- List of theaters in Omaha, Nebraska
- List of theatres and entertainment venues in Paris
- List of theatres in Ponce, Puerto Rico
- List of theatres and opera houses in Rome
- List of theatres in Saint Petersburg
- List of theatres and opera houses in Venice
- List of theaters in Washington, D.C.

== By country ==
- List of theatres in Albania
- List of theatres in China
- List of English Renaissance theatres
- List of theatres in Hungary
- List of Irish theatres and theatre companies
- List of theatres in North Korea
- List of theatres in Norway
- List of theatres in Scotland
- List of theatres in Serbia
- List of arts and entertainment venues in Singapore
- List of theatres and concert halls in Spain
- List of theatres in the United Kingdom
- List of theatres in Wales

=== United States ===
- List of theaters in California
- List of theaters in Colorado
- List of theaters in Illinois
- List of theaters in Kentucky
- List of theaters in Louisiana
- List of theaters in Maryland
- List of theaters in Michigan
- List of theaters in Minnesota
- List of theaters in New York
- List of theaters in North Carolina
- List of theaters in Ohio
- List of theaters in Washington, D.C.

== By type ==
- List of ancient Greek theatres
- List of theaters for dance
- List of dinner theaters
- List of drive-in theaters
- List of national theatres
- List of opera houses

== See also ==
- Outline of theatre
