= Chinese drama =

Chinese drama may refer to:

- Theatre of China
  - Huaju, also known as modern Chinese drama
- Chinese-language cinema:
  - Cinema of China
  - Cinema of Hong Kong
  - Cinema of Taiwan
- Chinese literature
- Chinese television drama

== See also ==
- Chinese theatre (disambiguation)
