= Carolina Theatre =

Carolina Theatre may refer to:

- Carolina Theatre (Charlotte), a performing arts venue in Charlotte, North Carolina
- Carolina Theatre (Durham), a performing arts venue in Durham, North Carolina
- Carolina Theatre of Greensboro, a performing arts venue in Greensboro, North Carolina
- Carolina Theatre (Lumberton, North Carolina), a performing arts venue in Lumberton, North Carolina

== See also ==
- List of theaters in North Carolina
- North Carolina Theatre
