= Zhang Boya =

Zhang Boya may refer to:

- Zhang Boya (Han dynasty), Chinese politician during the Han dynasty, whose tomb is at Dahuting
- Chang Po-ya (born 1942), Taiwanese politician
