= List of theatres in Budapest =

The following is a list of professional and amateur theatres and theatre companies in Budapest, Hungary. They are organised alphabetically in name order.

== B ==
- Bárka Theatre
- Budapest Puppet Theatre

== C ==
- Chamber Theatre of Budapest
- Cellar Theatre
- Centrál Theatre
- Comedy Theatre of Budapest

== D ==
- Deutsches Theater Budapest
- Duma Theatre

== E ==
- Erkel Theatre

== H ==
- Hétfőszín
- Hungarian State Opera House

== I ==
- International Buda Stage

== J ==
- Játékszín
- József Attila Theatre

== K ==
- Karinthy Theatre
- Katona József Theatre
- Kolibri Theatre
- Komédium
- Korona Pódium
- Körúti Theatre
- Krétakör Theatre

== M ==
- Madách Chamber
- Madách Theatre
- Magyar Theatre
- Maskara Társulat
- Merlin International Theatre
- MiaManó Theatre
- Mikroszkóp Színpad
- Millenáris Theatrum
- MU Theatre
- Musical Theatre

== N ==
- Nap Theatre
- National Dance Theatre
- National Theatre

== O ==
- Operett Theatre of Budapest
- Örkény István Theatre

== P ==
- Pesti Vigadó

== R ==
- Radnóti Miklós Theatre
- Ruttkai Éva Theatre

== S ==
- Szabad-Tér Theatre

== T ==
- Thália Theatre
- Trafó House of Contemporary Arts
- Tropicarium Theatre

== U ==
- Uncle Lakner's Children Theatre
- Új Theatre

== V ==
- Városi Theatre
- Vidám Színpad

== See also ==
- List of theatres in Hungary
