= List of theaters in Michigan =

The following is a list of theaters in Michigan.

== Metro Detroit ==
These theaters are in Metro Detroit.

- Arthur Miller Theatre, University of Michigan, Ann Arbor
- Ford Community and Performing Arts Center, Dearborn
- Hill Auditorium, University of Michigan, Ann Arbor
- Lydia Mendelssohn Theatre, University of Michigan, Ann Arbor
- Macomb Music Theatre
- Michigan Theater (Ann Arbor)
- McMorran Place, Port Huron
- Players Guild of Dearborn, Dearborn
- Power Center for the Performing Arts, University of Michigan, Ann Arbor
- Rackham Auditorium, University of Michigan, Ann Arbor
- Stagecrafters at The Baldwin Theatre, Royal Oak, MI
- The Whiting (auditorium), Flint
- Tipping Point Theatre, Northville

== Outside Metro Detroit ==
- Croswell Opera House, Adrian (oldest theater in Michigan)
- Calumet Theatre, Calumet
- Grand Rapids Civic Theatre, Grand Rapids
- Grant Fine Arts Center
- Howard Performing Arts Center, Berrien Springs
- Ironwood Theatre
- Maltz Opera House, Alpena
- Midland Center for the Arts
- Miller Auditorium, Kalamazoo
- State Theatre, Kalamazoo
- Tecumseh Center for the Arts, Tecumseh
- Wharton Center for Performing Arts, East Lansing
- Enter Stage Right at The Citadel Stage, Port Huron
