= Chinese theatre (disambiguation) =

Chinese theatre may refer to:

- Theatre of China
- Chinese Village (Tsarskoe Selo), Russia, including the Chinese Opera Theatre of Catherine the Great
- Grauman's Chinese Theatre, or TCL Chinese Theatre, in Hollywood, U.S.
- Chinese theater of World War II, or the Second Sino-Japanese War
