= Theatre of China =

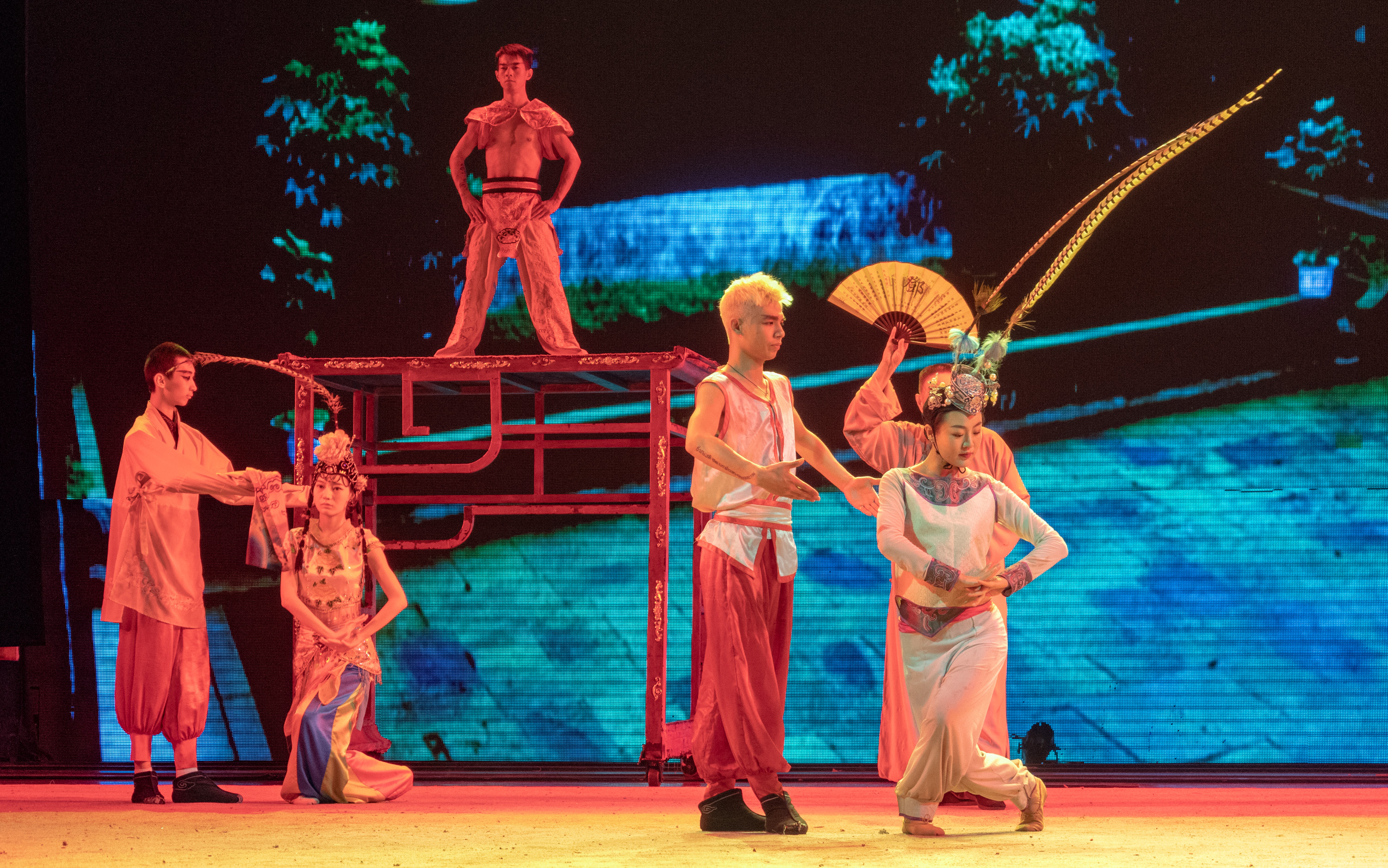
Performers in a production in Chengdu

Theatre of China has a long and complex history. Traditional Chinese theatre, generally in the form of Chinese opera, is musical in nature. Chinese theatre can trace its origin back a few millennia to ancient China, but the Chinese opera started to develop in the 12th century. Western forms like the spoken drama, western-style opera, and ballet did not arrive in China until the 20th century.

== History ==
Performance in music and dance in China dates back to as early as the Shang dynasty (16th century BC?–c. 1046 BC). Oracle bone records reference rain dances performed by shamans, while the Book of Documents mentions shamanistic dancing and singing. For the Zhou dynasty (c. 1046 BC – 256 BC), evidence from the Chu Ci suggests that in the 4th or 3rd century BC State of Chu, shamans performed with music and costumes. Some scholars have identified poems from the Classic of Poetry as possible lyrics of songs accompanying court dances from the early or mid-Zhou dynasty.

The Zhou royal court as well as the various ancient states employed professional entertainers which included not only dancers and musicians but also actors. The earliest court actors were likely clowns who pantomimed, danced, sang, and performed comedy. One of the most famous actors from this period was You Meng or Jester Meng (優孟), a giant who served King Zhuang of Chu (reigned 613–591 BC). After meeting the impoverished son of Sunshu Ao, the late prime minister of Chu, he is said to have spent a year imitating Sunshu Ao's speech and mannerism. Finally he performed his role at a banquet and successfully appealed to King Zhuang who then granted land to Sunshu Ao's son.

Records of the Grand Historian by Sima Qian contains a passage about Confucius (551–479 BC) explaining the Great Warrior Dance or Dawu Dance (Chinese: 大武舞; pinyin: Dàwǔ Wǔ), which told the story of King Wu of Zhou's overthrow of the Shang dynasty in c. 1046 BC, and how he founded the Zhou dynasty with the help of Duke of Zhou and Duke of Shao. The Great Warrior Dance not only depicted a full story, but was also filled with symbolism, as Confucius explained:

When they dance in two rows and lunge in all directions with their weapons, they are spreading the awe of his military might throughout the Central States. When they divide up and advance in twos, it indicates that the enterprise has now been successfully accomplished. When they stand for a long time in their dancing positions, they are waiting for the arrival of the rulers of the various states.

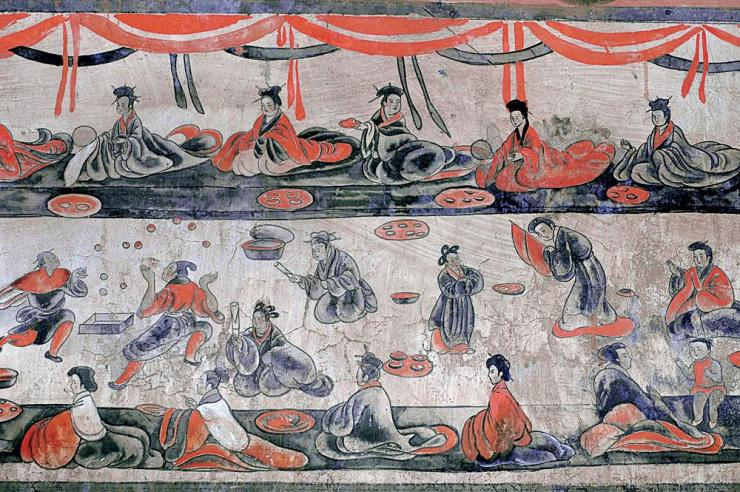
Part of a second-century tomb mural from Dahuting which depicts entertainers at an aristocratic banquet.

During the Han dynasty (206 BC–220 AD), a wrestling show called Horn-Butting Show (Chinese: 角觝戲; pinyin: Jiǎodǐxì) flourished and became one of the so-called "Hundred Shows" (百戲) under Emperor Wu (reigned 141–87 BC). While most probably this was also a spectator sport, both textual and archaeological evidence suggests that performers were dressed in fixed roles and performed according to a plot. One such story the wrestlers re-enacted was the battle between a tiger and a magician named "Lord Huang from the East Sea" (東海黃公). Han-period murals discovered from an aristocratic tomb in Dahuting, Xinmi, Henan, offer strong proof that entertainers performed at banquets in the homes of higher-ranking ministers during this period.

=== Six Dynasties, Tang dynasty, and Five Dynasties ===
An early form of Chinese drama is the Canjun Opera (參軍戲, or Adjutant Play) which originated from the Later Zhao dynasty (319–351). In its early form, it was a simple comic drama involving only two performers, where a corrupt officer, Canjun or the adjutant, was ridiculed by a jester named Grey Hawk (蒼鶻). The characters in Canjun Opera are thought to be the forerunners of the fixed role categories of later Chinese opera, particularly of its comic chou (丑) characters.

Various song and dance dramas developed during the Six Dynasties period. During the Northern Qi dynasty, a masked dance called the Big Face (大面, which can mean "mask", alternatively daimian 代面, and it was also called The Prince of Lanling, 蘭陵王), was created in honour of Gao Changgong who went into battle wearing a mask. Another was called Botou (撥頭, also 缽頭), a masked dance drama from the Western Regions that tells the story of a grieving son who sought a tiger that killed his father. In The Dancing Singing Woman (踏謡娘), which relates the story of a wife battered by her drunken husband, the song and dance drama was initially performed by a man dressed as a woman. The stories told in of these song-and-dance dramas are simple, but they are thought to be the earliest pieces of musical theatre in China, and the precursors to the more sophisticated later forms of Chinese opera.

The Later Tang (923–937) founding emperor Li Cunxu (885–926) — who was of Shatuo extraction — was so passionate about theatre that he enjoyed acting himself. During his reign, he appointed three actors to prefect-ship and in the process alienated his army. In 926, after just 3 years on the throne, he was killed in a mutiny led by a former actor named Guo Congqian.

=== Song, Jin, and Yuan dynasties ===
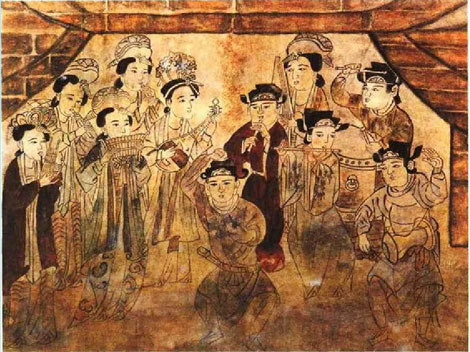
Mural from a Song dynasty tomb in Henan, depicting a dancer and accompanying musicians.

In the Song dynasty, popular plays involving drama and music began to be developed, and by the 12th century, the term xìqǔ (戲曲) to mean Chinese opera began to be used this new form of theatrical entertainment. The development of theatre during the Song dynasty may also have been influenced by a Tang Buddhist tradition bianwen (變文), which mixed speech with song and used by monks to communicate Buddhist idea to the illiterate masses, but became popular entertainment during the Song dynasty. The narrative ballad and story-telling forms influenced Song dramas. Buddhist stories such as Mulian Rescues His Mother became themes in plays, and the one on Mulian was the first Chinese drama of great length. The Romance of the Western Chamber Zhu Gongdiao (西廂記諸宮調) by Dong Jieyuan (董解元) (later adapted into Romance of the Western Chamber by Wang Shifu) was created from bianwen.

In Southern Song, a form of play called nanxi or Xiwen (戲文) developed in Wenzhou from local folk customs and musical forms. This has a set length and a full narrative, and the actors performed with speech and songs. Nanxi spread widely in the Southern Song, and theatrical entertainment flourished in its capital Lin'an (present day Hangzhou). Among the earliest surviving scripts is Southern Song work, The No. 1 Scholar Zhang Xie (張協狀元). Specialised roles such as Dan (旦, dàn, female), Sheng (生, male), Jing (净,) and Chou (丑, clown) appeared in the Song era, and scripts referred to the roles such as the Dan or Sheng rather than the characters' names.

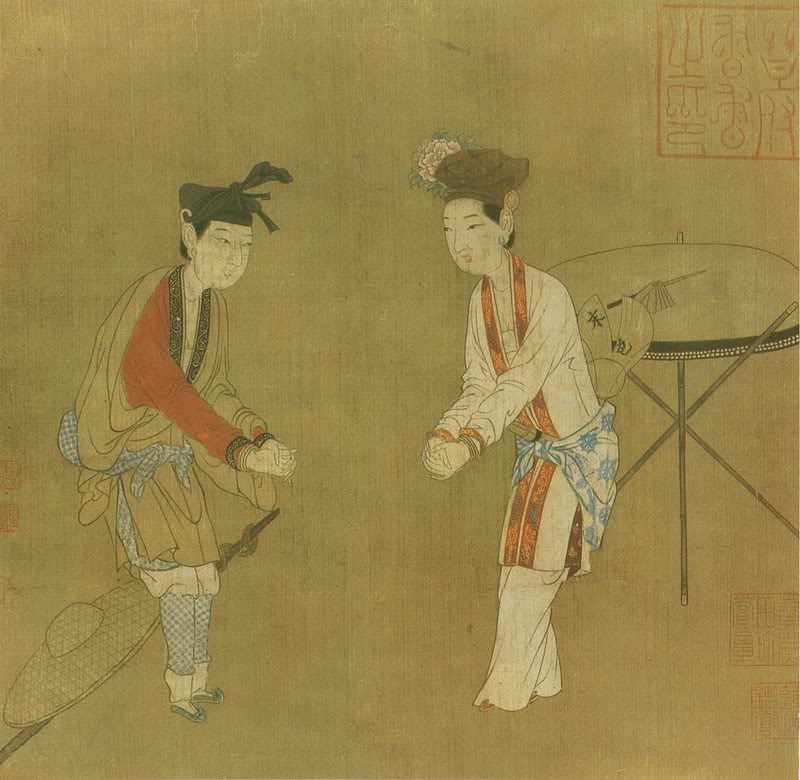
Song dynasty zaju, showing two women playing male roles, a popular convention during the Song dynasty

A form of theatre known as zaju began to be developed in the Song and Jin dynasties. Song and Jin zaju was a small-scale comic form of theatre, and was distinct from Yuan zaju with its own independent development. Music is incidental to Song Jin zaju with incomplete narratives.

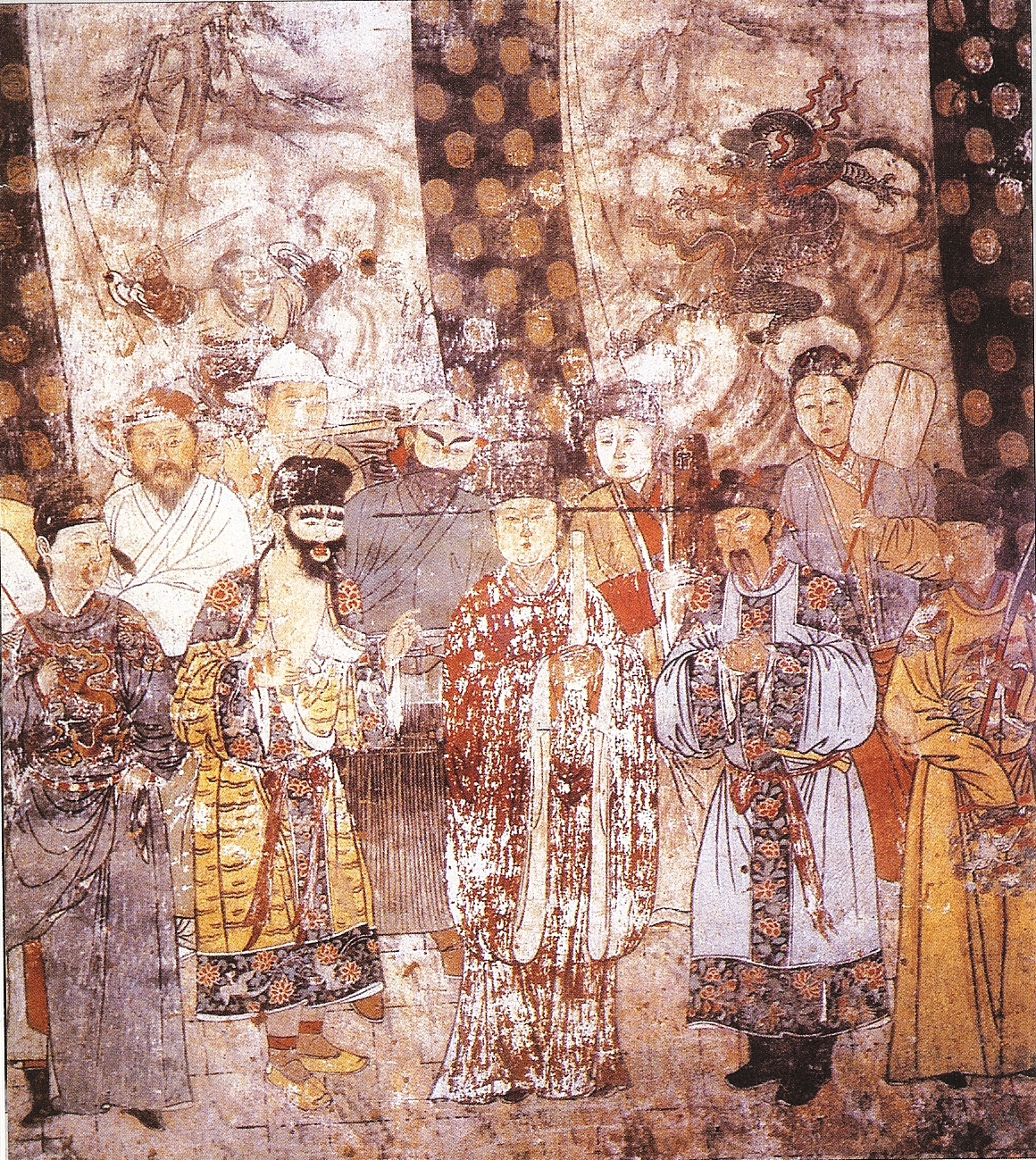
A mural depicting the Yuan zaju stage c. 1324, found in the Guangsheng Temple of Shanxi province.

Zaju became the dominant form of theatre during the Yuan dynasty in major cities such as Kaifeng, Luoyang and Lin'an. Yuan dynasty zaju was also known as Northern tune (北曲) to distinguish it from the Southern form nanxi. Zaju in the Yuan dynasty became a more sophisticated form that has a four- or five-act structure with a prologue. Each act is a musical piece based on a different gongdiao. It was performed by courtesans for the amusement of court or local government officials. Zaju plays were focused on the principal male (Sheng) and female (Dan) characters, with the singing courtesans playing the main male or female characters, but some are played exclusively by male actors. Over time subcategories of male and female roles (such as lead and supporting roles, young, old or comic roles) also emerged.

Although the men and women who performed these dramas had very low social positions, writing dramas became a respectable activity among literati of the era. Among the best-known dramatists of the period were Guan Hanqing (many of his works survive, including The Injustice to Dou E), Wang Shifu (who wrote Romance of the Western Chamber), Ma Zhiyuan (whose representative work is Autumn in Han Palace, 漢宮秋), Ji Junxiang (best known for The Orphan of Zhao), and Bai Pu. Verses from Yuan zaju are considered one of the important forms of Chinese literature, yuanqu (元曲).

=== Ming dynasty ===
The nanxi of the Song and Yuan dynasties was considered a low art form due to its unsophisticated literary style, and its plays were often written by anonymous authors. The first nanxi work with a known author is Tale of the Pipa by Gao Ming, written in the late Yuan period. Tale of the Pipa elevated the status of nanxi, and was highly regarded by the first Ming Emperor Hongwu. It became a model for Ming dynasty drama. Nanxi and other regional forms, such as such as Haiyan, Yuyao, an Yiyang tunes developed in Zhejiang, gradually replaced the northern zaju, and by the middle of the Ming dynasty, nanxi had developed into a more complex dramatic form known as chuanqi, which further developed into Kunqu Opera.

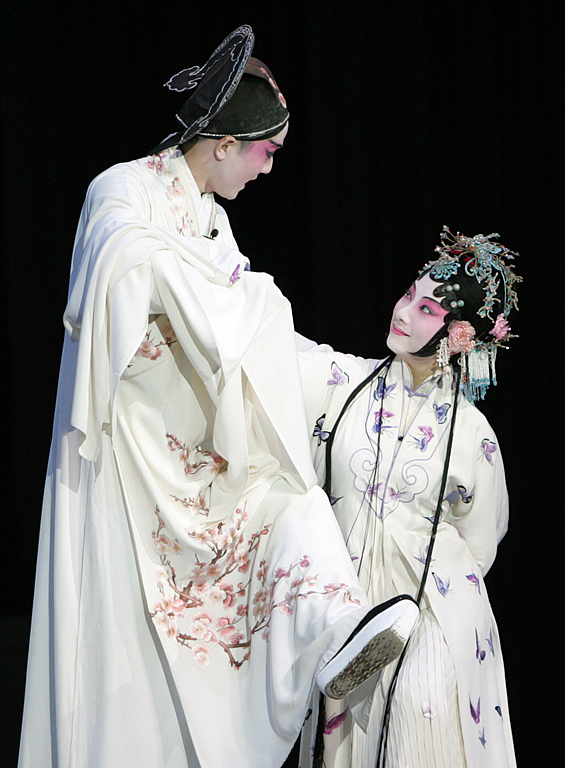
A scene from the most famous of kunqu operas, The Peony Pavilion

The Ming dynasty play writers were mostly educated and hold relatively high social status, and chuanqi works were created mainly by scholars. Wei Liangfu created Kunshan tunes modified from tunes of Haiyan from near Hangzhou and Yiyang of Jiangxi, and he combined the nanxi rhythms which often used flute, and the northern zaju where plucked string instruments are preferred. The first Kunqu opera, Washing Silken Gauze (浣紗記, Huan Sha Ji) was created by Liang Chenyu who used Kunshan tunes. Kunqu was regarded as an elegant part of the culture; it was promoted by scholars, and therefore became highly influential.

In the Ming dynasty, southern yiyang tunes fused with Kunqu and spread widely. Yiyang tunes lacked formal rules, was more uninhibited and exciting, therefore more appealing to the local classes and easily fused with local musical styles and produced many high-pitched tunes in numerous local operas. Another important development was the emergence of Shaanxi Opera in the Northwest with a two-phrase structure and clapper-based instrumentation, introducing a new form of musical style called banqiang (板腔). Its spread was facilitated by a Shaanxi rebel Li Zicheng who ended the Ming dynasty, later influencing the development of Peking Opera during the Qing dynasty.

During the Ming period (1368-1644), Chinese theatre may be divided into three categories by audience: imperial court, social elite, and the general public.

The Ming imperial court enjoyed opera, and Ming emperors generally kept their music entertainments within the palace. Ming theatre, however, had less freedom than the previous dynasty, Yuan. In the Yuan and early Song period, some plays may include a role of the emperor, however, Ming Emperor Taizu prohibited actors from impersonating any imperial members, high officials, or well-respected figures, although such restrictions were not always observed by opera troupes who performed for commoners in public theatre.

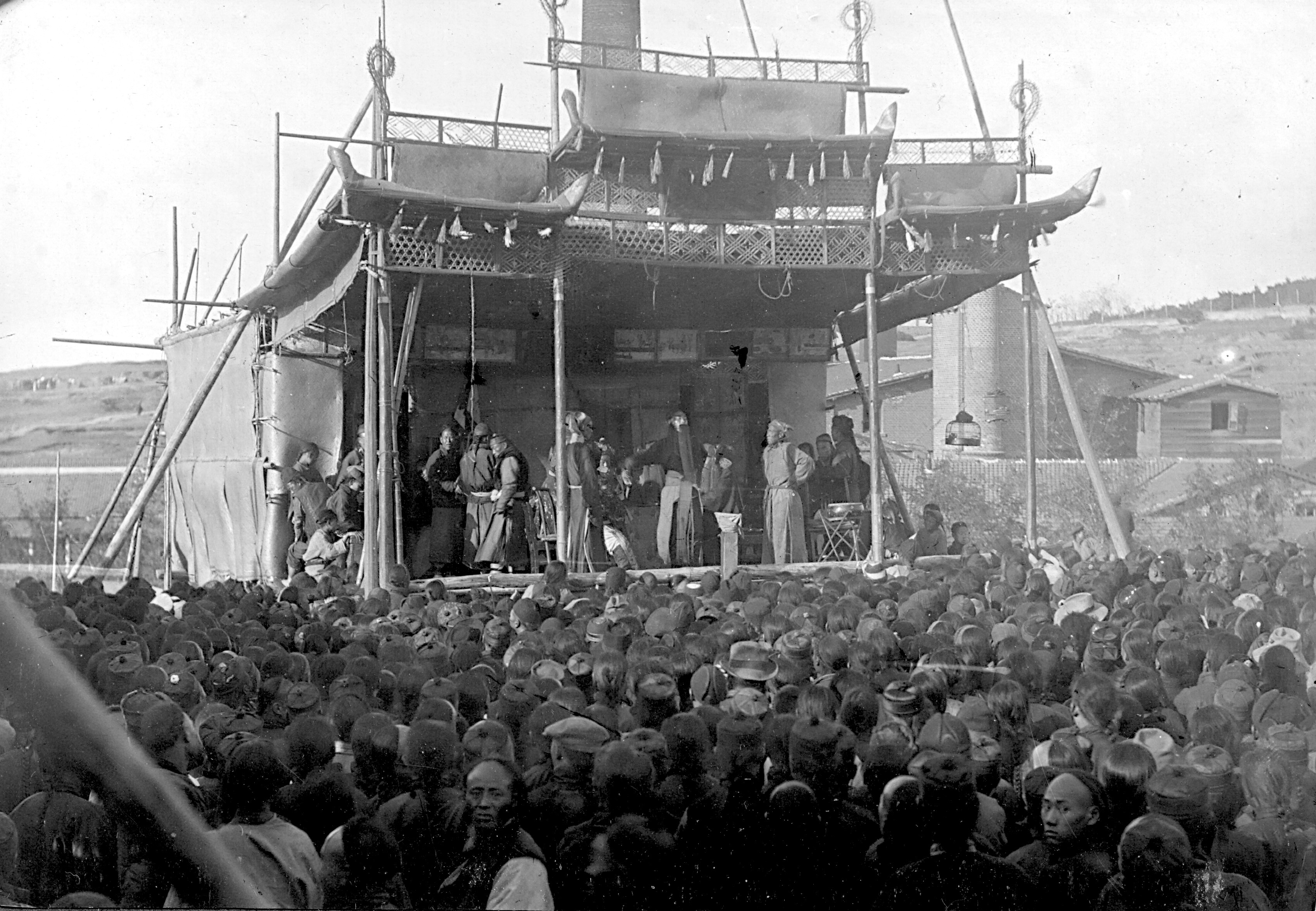
Chinese theatre production pre-1912, and probably in Shandong province

Private theatre troupes featured prominently during Ming China, and government officials, rich merchants, and eunuchs may manage private theatre troupes to entertainment guests in stages built in their private residences, or a sign of status. A female courtesan in late Ming named Ma Xianglan was the only woman known to have owned a private theatre troupe. Developing a private theatre troupe represented a huge investment; the owners first pick potential actors from poor families or slave households and from performing schools, with more emphasis on their looks. and the owners would invest in further training for these people. The troupe leaders may hire retired actors to teach the actors, and some were trained actors themselves. The actors underwent strict training in singing, dancing, and role-playing techniques, which may take as long as eight years. While the performers were highly skilled, they were also regarded to be of low status in Ming society, as it was common practice for them to provide sexual services, both heterosexual and homosexual. Some actresses become their owners' wives or concubines The common career span for actors were ten years. When actors passed their teenage years, they had the freedom to retire.

Professional public troupes did not thrive until Ming elite class started to collapse. Due to the Ming's Confucian influence of gender separation, public theatres were dominated by males. Confucian influences extended to the plays; Ming plays often conveyed Confucian teachings, especially in private theatre troupes. For instance, as women desired more equality towards late Ming, Wang Tingne wrote a play called Shi Hou Ji (狮吼记) that emphasized male authority over women.

The standard types of Ming actors includes Cai, Hui, and Zhi. Cai is extraordinary talent, and Hui is the wisdom that enables them to utilize their skills with flexibility. The most important one is Zhi, the ability to combine practical and abstract beauty on stage. As for techniques, the actors needed to excel in singing, dancing, and role-playing. These actors developed outstanding singing and dancing techniques to serve the ultimate goal of creating a character.

=== Qing dynasty ===
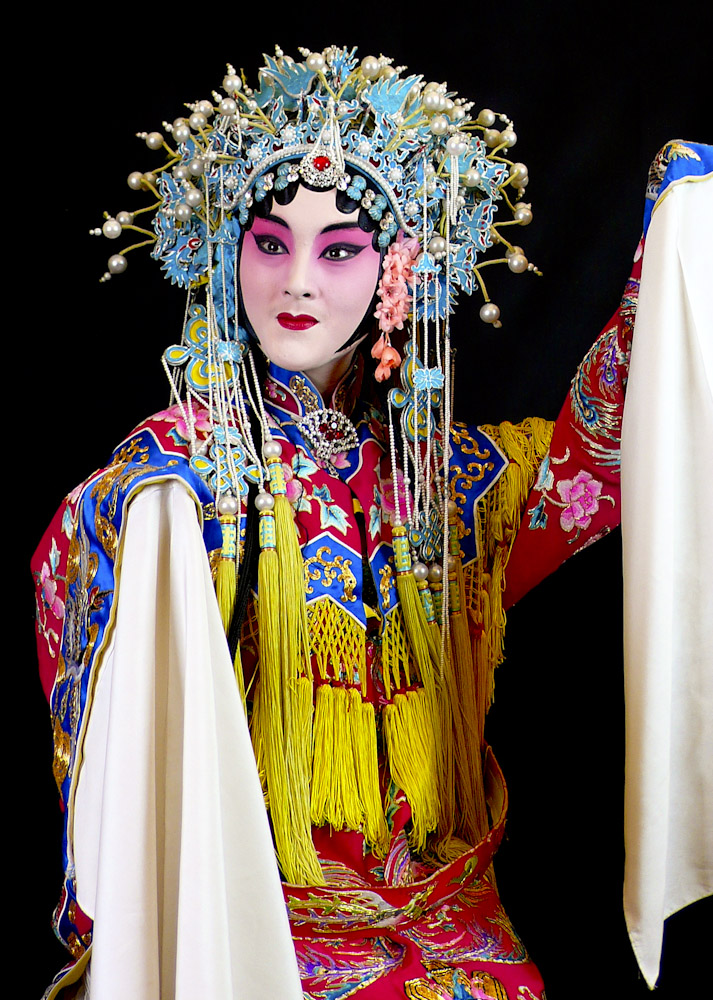
A performance of The Drunken Concubine (貴妃醉酒) in Peking Opera

During the Qing dynasty, Peking opera developed from a mixing of different opera styles and became the dominant form. In 1790, various local opera troupes performed in Beijing in celebration of the 55th year of Qianlong Emperor's reign. The Huizhou opera troupes, which performed operas with diverse tune patterns including Kunqu, Clapper Opera and the Erhuang melody prove to be the most popular. Hanju Opera that came from the Yangtze River and Hanshui area was also popular, and the mixing of Huizhou and Hanju produced the Peking Opera. Peking opera inherited many stories form Kunqu opera, but other styles of opera, such as the Clapper opera popular with the common people, had greater influence on its development. Teahouses which sprang up in Beijing staged Peking operas. Kunqu, referred to as Yabu (雅部, "elegant drama"), declined in popularity as it came under competition from a variety of operas including Peking Opera known collectively as Huabu (花部, "flowery drama"). A range of other regional operas also emerged, such as Shanxi opera, Henan opera, Hebei opera, Shandong Laizhou clapper opera, Cantonese opera and Fujian opera.

In various regions, local forms of opera flourished, and became popular in major cities by the end of the Qing dynasty and early Republican era. Some of these may developed from folk song-and-dance performances that evolved from "The Dancing Singing Woman" (踏謡娘) style of theatre, such as Flower-Drum (花鼓) Opera, Flower-Lantern (花燈) Opera, Tea-Picking (採茶) Opera and Yangge Opera. For example, the Huangxiao Flower-Drum opera of Hubei evolved into Chuju (楚劇) in Wuhan. Wuxi Opera, Shanghai Opera, and Shaoxing Opera on the other hand developed from a form of opera popular south of the Yangtze River called Tanhuang, while Pingju Opera formed from Lianhualao and Yangge in Hebei.

=== 20th century ===
By the early 20th century, non-singing theatrical forms began to appear under the influence of Western dramas and stage plays. Shanghai, where Western drama was first staged by Western expatriate communities in China in 1850, was the birthplace of modern Chinese stage plays. Students of St. John's College were known to have performed the first modern Chinese play A Shameful Story About Officialdom (官场丑事, Guan Chang Chou Shi') in 1899, and in 1900, students of Nanyang College staged three plays based on contemporary events, such as one based on the Six Gentlemen (六君子) and the Boxer Rebellion. Student plays proliferated, with students playing an important role in the development of spoken theater (huaju), and notable dramatists such as Cao Yu, Hong Shen, and Gao Xingjian began honed their craft on campus. Among the most important plays produced in this period was Thunderstorm by Cao Yu.

In the Republican era, Cantonese opera entered a golden age, with numerous new plays being written. Peking Opera also became popular in Shanghai, where new dramas in the form serialized dramas emerged. The best-known actor of Peking opera was Mei Lanfang, whose performances spread the fame of Peking opera worldwide.

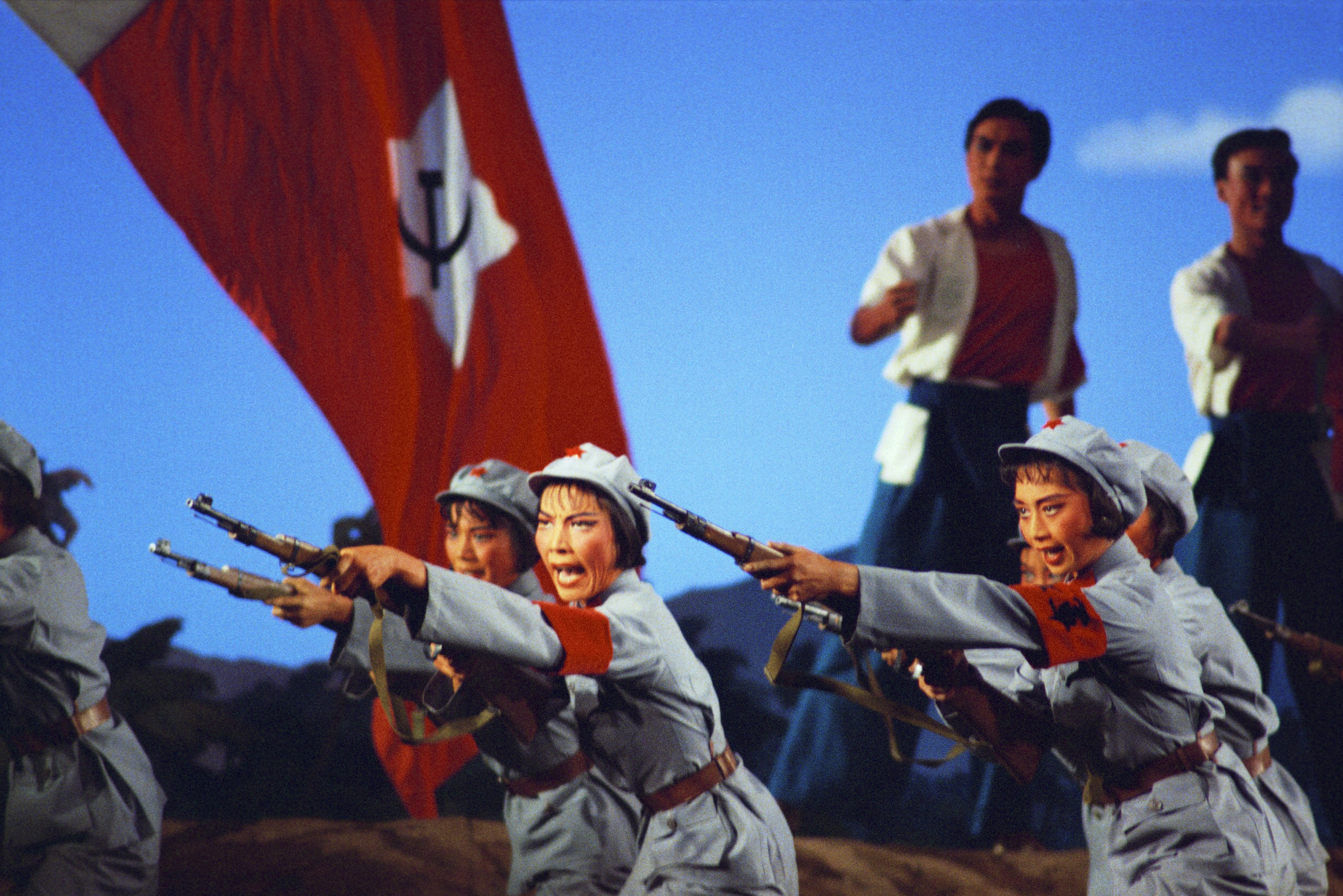
The Red Detachment of Women

In the People's Republic of China era, the government set up a special department for the improvement of drama. The first national opera festival was organized where numerous operas from around country as well as operas identified as "model plays" were performed. Opera was modified, and Model opera with political message was created. The first Model Opera was Taking Tiger Mountain by Strategy. By the Cultural Revolution, Model opera had monopolized the theatre. However, after the Cultural Revolution, traditional forms were revived and with fewer restrictions, and new plays influenced by Western theatre also began to be staged.

== Modern Chinese theatre ==
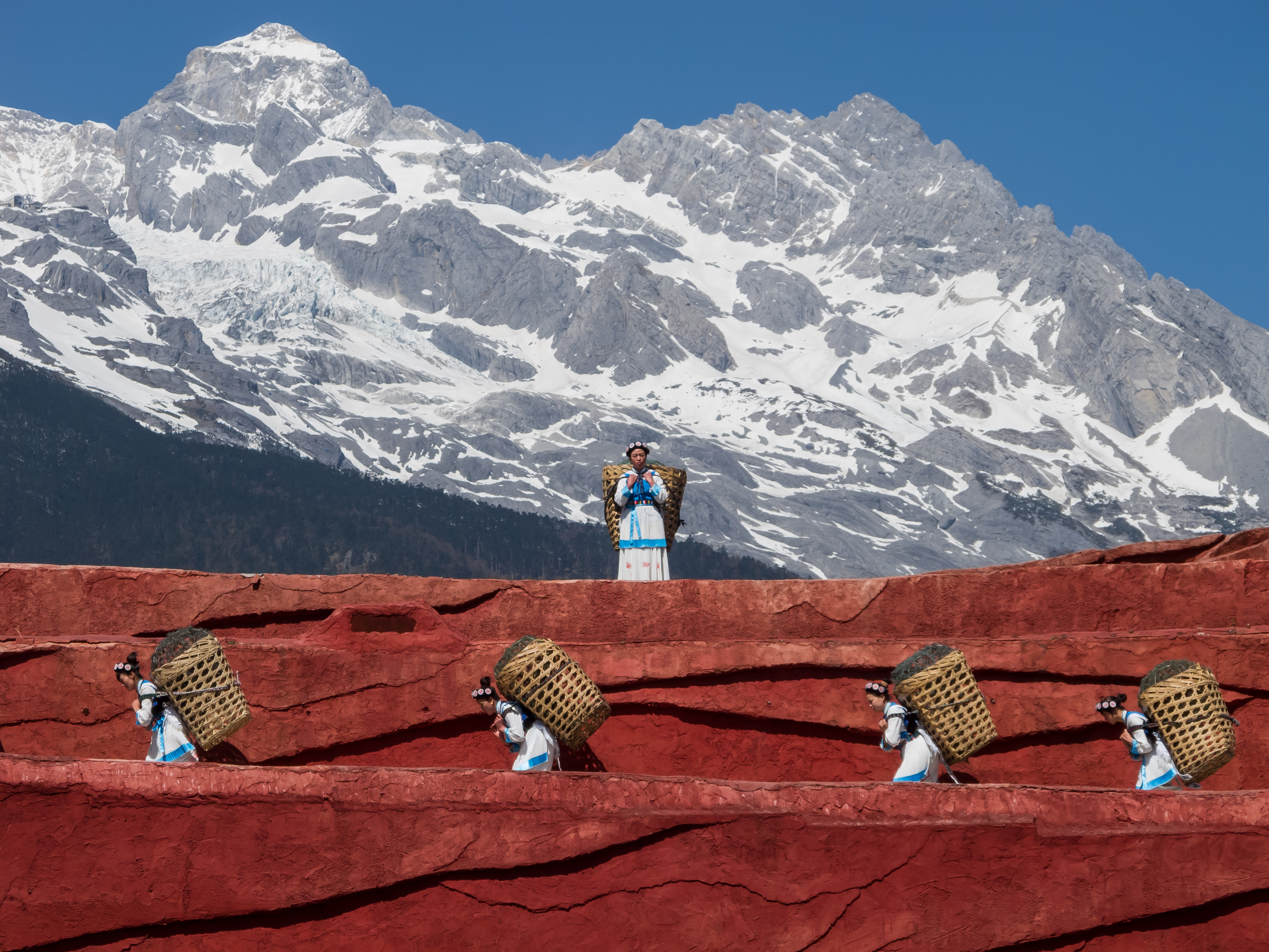
Scene from a public performance in the Jade Dragon Snow Mountain Open Air Theatre

Modern Chinese theatre and drama has changed quite a lot compared to the past. The influences of the modern world affected the form of music/ theatre/ drama the Chinese were having. The rapid development of the country affected theater plays. The current Chinese theater has been developed to a new form: people do not watch plays from theater, they watch it at homes or on their TV. In addition to music theater, the modern world inspired new forms of drama, including what became known as the spoken drama (simplified Chinese: 话剧; traditional Chinese: 話劇; pinyin: Huàjù) of the transatlantic stage.

== Hsiu, sleeve movement ==
Sleeve movements were an important feature of dancing technique in ancient China and were considered essential to add the grace of the performer. There are many references to the beauty of a dancer's sleeves to be found in old Chinese poems.

"What festival is this, with lamps filling in the hall, And golden hair pins dancing by night alongside of flowery lutes? A fragrance breeze flutters the sleeve and a red haze arises, While jade wrists flit round and round in mazy flight."

== Shadow play ==
During the dynasty of Empress Ping, shadow puppetry first emerged as a recognized form of theatre in China. There were two distinct forms of shadow puppetry, Pekingese (northern) and Cantonese (southern). The two styles were differentiated by the method of making the puppets and the positioning of the rods on the puppets, as opposed to the type of play performed by the puppets. Both styles generally performed plays depicting great adventure and fantasy, rarely was this very stylized form of theatre used for political propaganda. Cantonese shadow puppets were the larger of the two. They were built using thick leather which created more substantial shadows. Symbolic color was also very prevalent; a black face represented honesty, a red one bravery. The rods used to control Cantonese puppets were attached perpendicular to the puppets' heads. Thus, they were not seen by the audience when the shadow was created. Pekingese puppets were more delicate and smaller. They were created out of thin, translucent leather (usually taken from the belly of a peacock). They were painted with vibrant paints, thus they cast a very colorful shadow. The thin rods which controlled their movements were attached to a leather collar at the neck of the puppet. The rods ran parallel to the bodies of the puppet then turned at a ninety degree angle to connect to the neck. While these rods were visible when the shadow was cast, they laid outside the shadow of the puppet; thus they did not interfere with the appearance of the figure. The rods attached at the necks to facilitate the use of multiple heads with one body. When the heads were not being used, they were stored in a muslin book or fabric lined box. The heads were always removed at night. This was in keeping with the old superstition that if left intact, the puppets would come to life at night. Some puppeteers went so far as to store the heads in one box and the bodies in another, to further reduce the possibility of reanimating puppets. Shadow puppetry is said to have reached its highest point of artistic development in the seventh century before becoming a tool of the government.

== Xiangsheng ==
Xiangsheng is a style of traditional Chinese comedic performance in the form of a monologue or dialogue. Chinese performers usually clap with the audience at the end of a performance; the return applause is a sign of appreciation to the audience.

== See also ==
- List of theatres in China
