= List of theatres in China =

This is a list of Chinese theatres.

- Anhui Huangmei Opera Theatre
- Beijing Concert Hall
- Beijing Peking Opera Theatre
- Beijing People's Art Theatre
- Century Theater & Century Performance Company
- Changchun Drama Theatre
- Chengdu Chuanju Theatre
- China Grand Theatre
- China National Children's Arts Theatre
- China National Opera House
- China Pingju Theatre
- Dongguan Yulan Theatre
- Guangdong Art Center Friendship Theatre
- Guangdong Chaoju Theatre
- Guangdong Drama Theatre
- Guangdong Xinghai Concert Hall
- Guoan Theatre
- Hangzhou Grand Theatre
- Hangzhou Theatre
- Harbin Drama Theatre
- Harbin Grand Theatre
- Hebei Provincial Song and Dance Theatre of China
- Liaoning People's Art Theatre
- National Grand Theatre
- National Theatre Company of China
- Ningbo Grand Theatre
- Poly Theatre
- Shanghai Concert Hall
- Shanghai Grand Theatre
- Shanghai Opera
- Shanghai Peking Opera Theatre
- Shanghai Yueju Theatre
- Shantou Philharmonic Orchestra
- Shenzhen Cultural Center
- Shenzhen Grand Theatre
- Xi'an Qinqiang Theatre
- Zhejiang Song and Dance Theatre
- Zhejiang Victorious Theatre
- Zhongshan Concert Hall

== See also ==
- Chinese theatre
- Category:Chinese dramatists and playwrights
