= List of theatres in Hungary =

The following is a list of professional and amateur theatres and theatre companies, temporary open-air theatres and stages in Hungary. They are organised in categories.

== Classical theatres ==
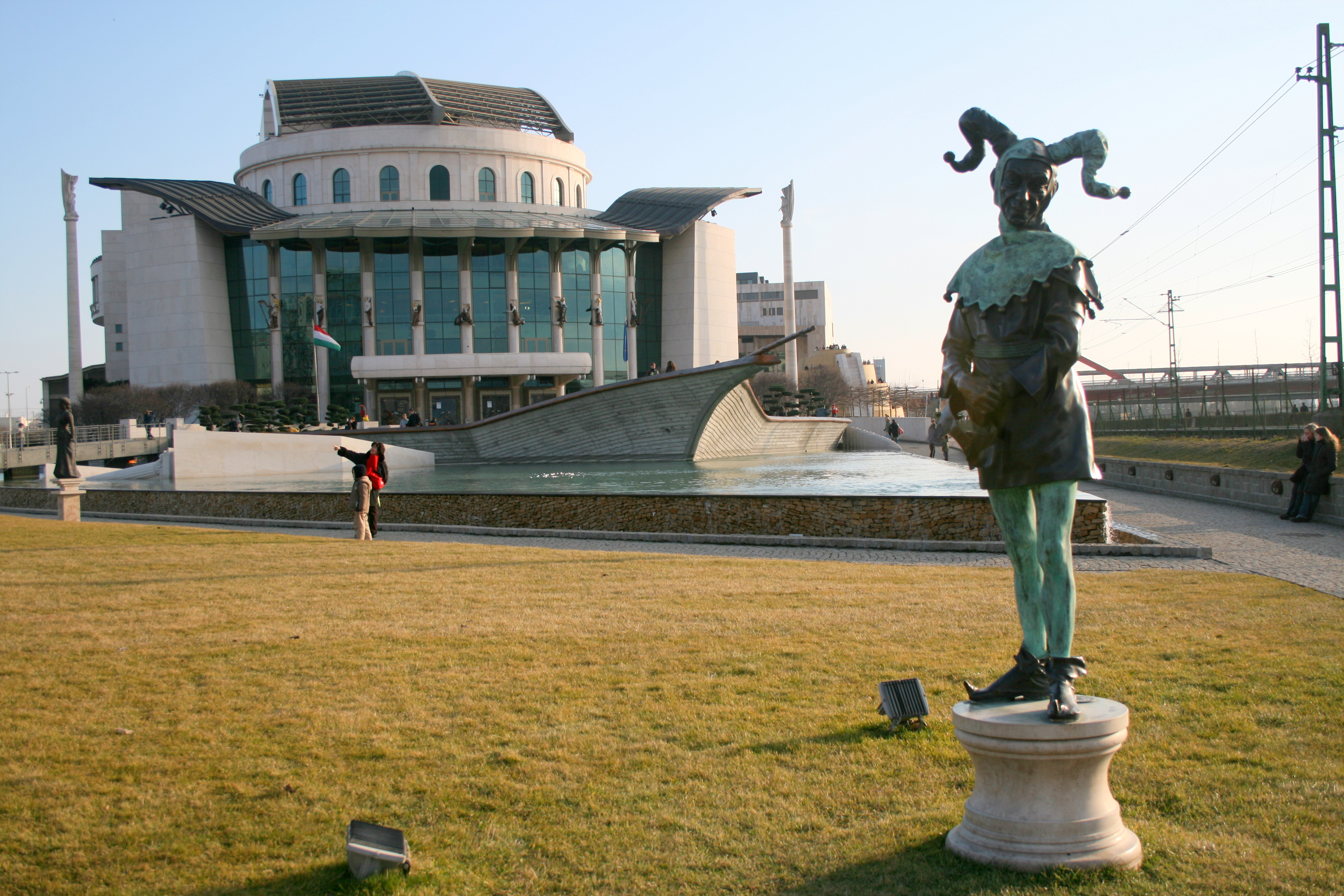
National Theatre, Budapest

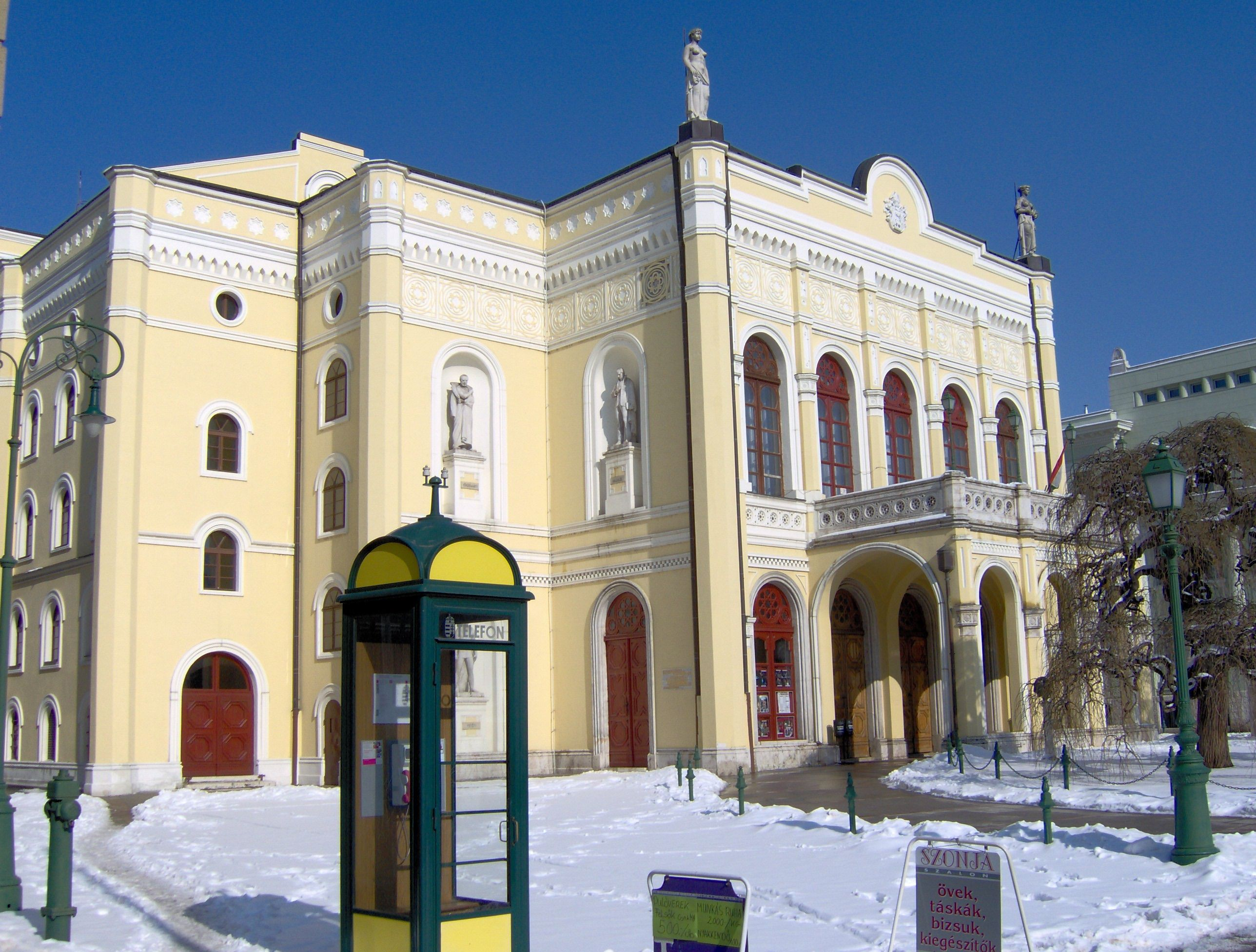
Csokonai Theatre, Debrecen

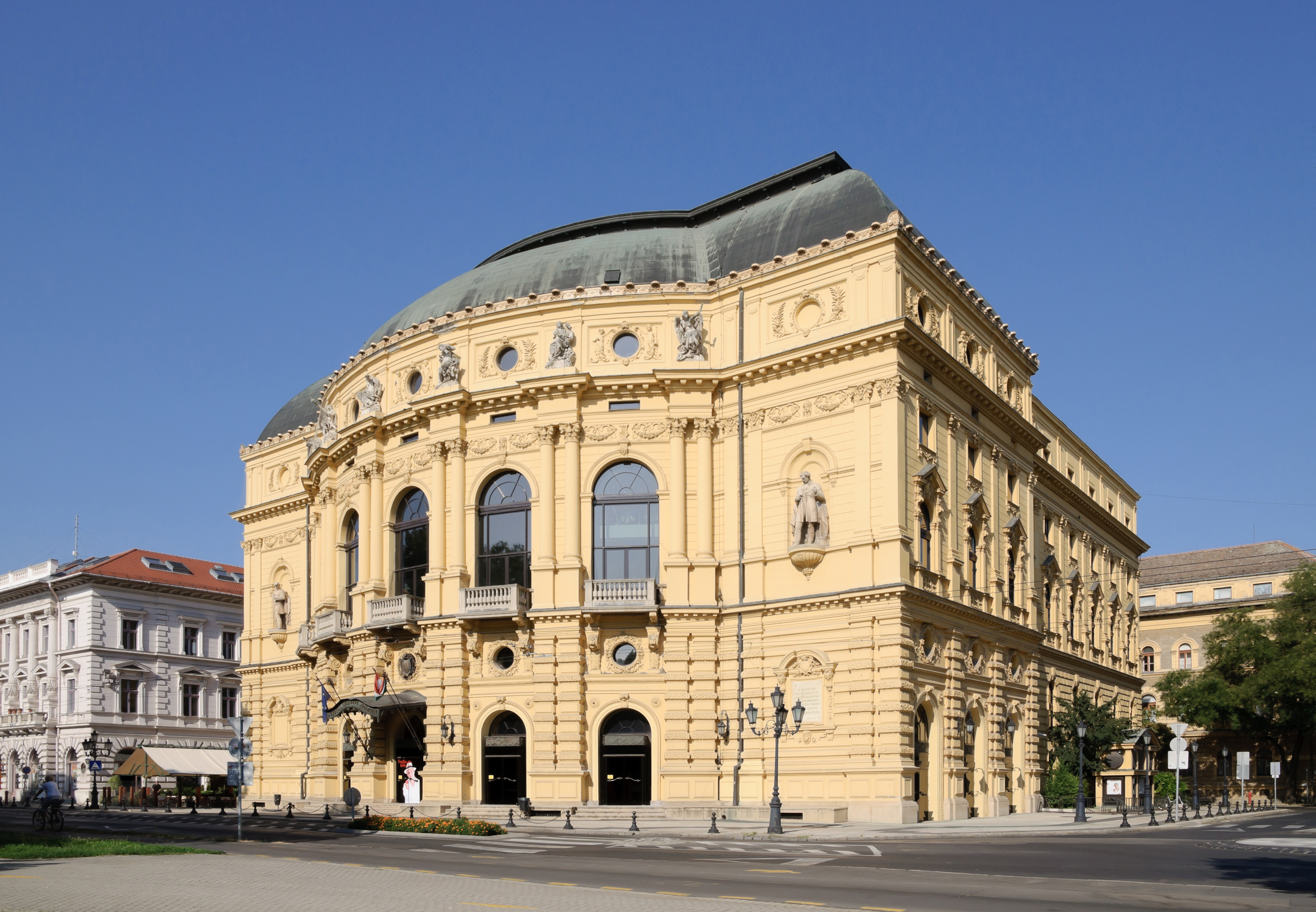
National Theatre, Szeged

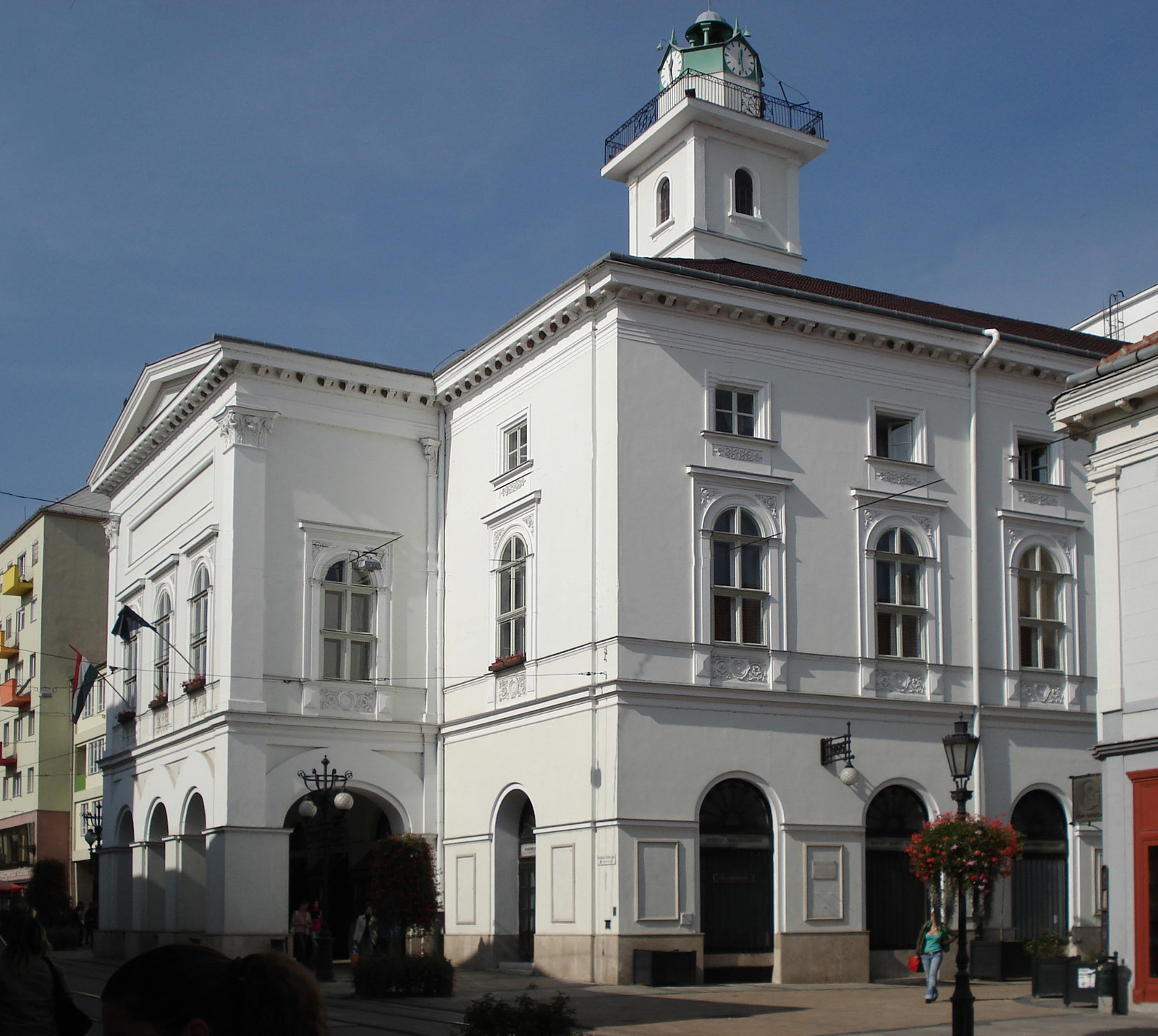
National Theatre, Miskolc

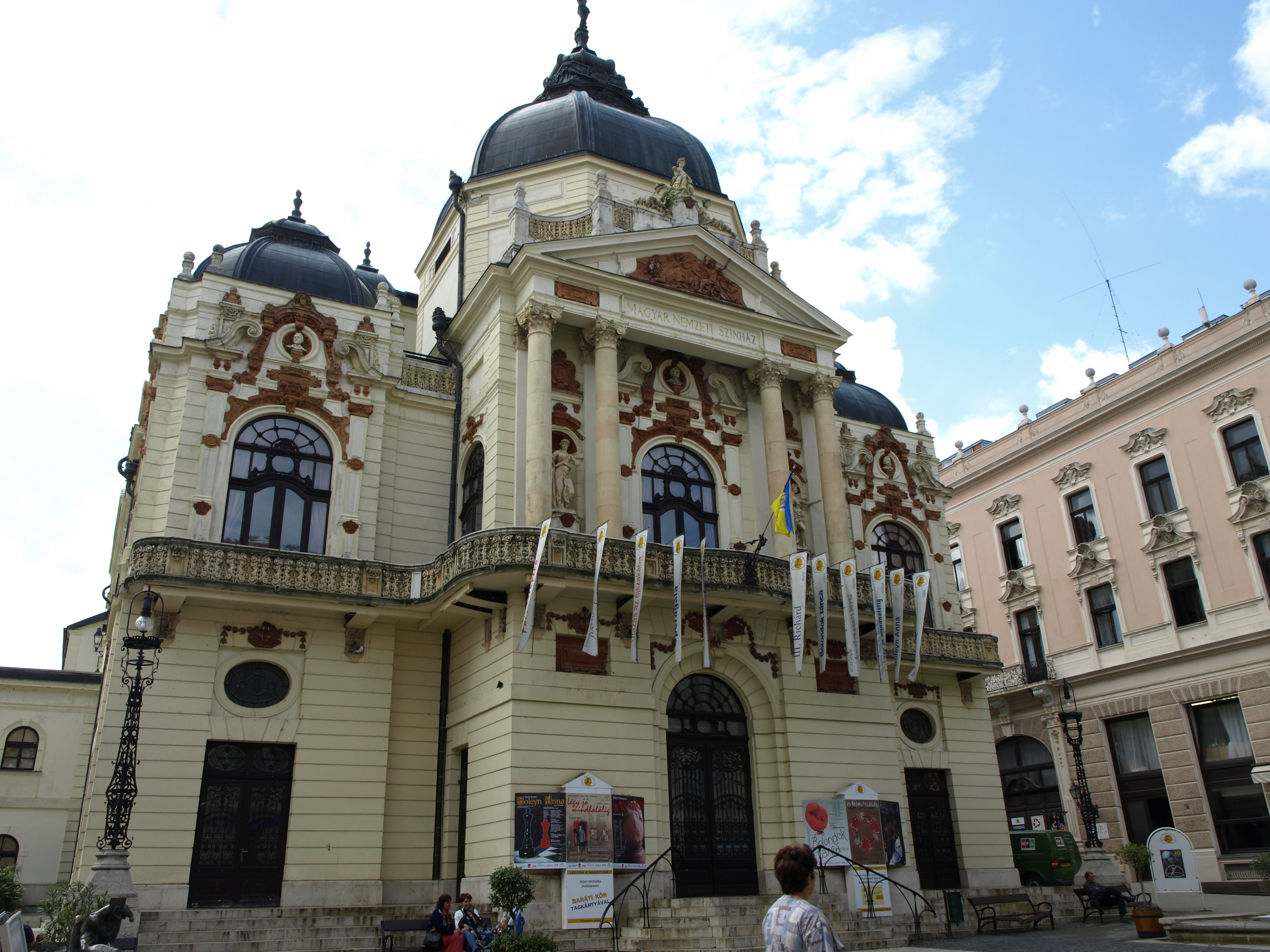
National Theatre, Pécs

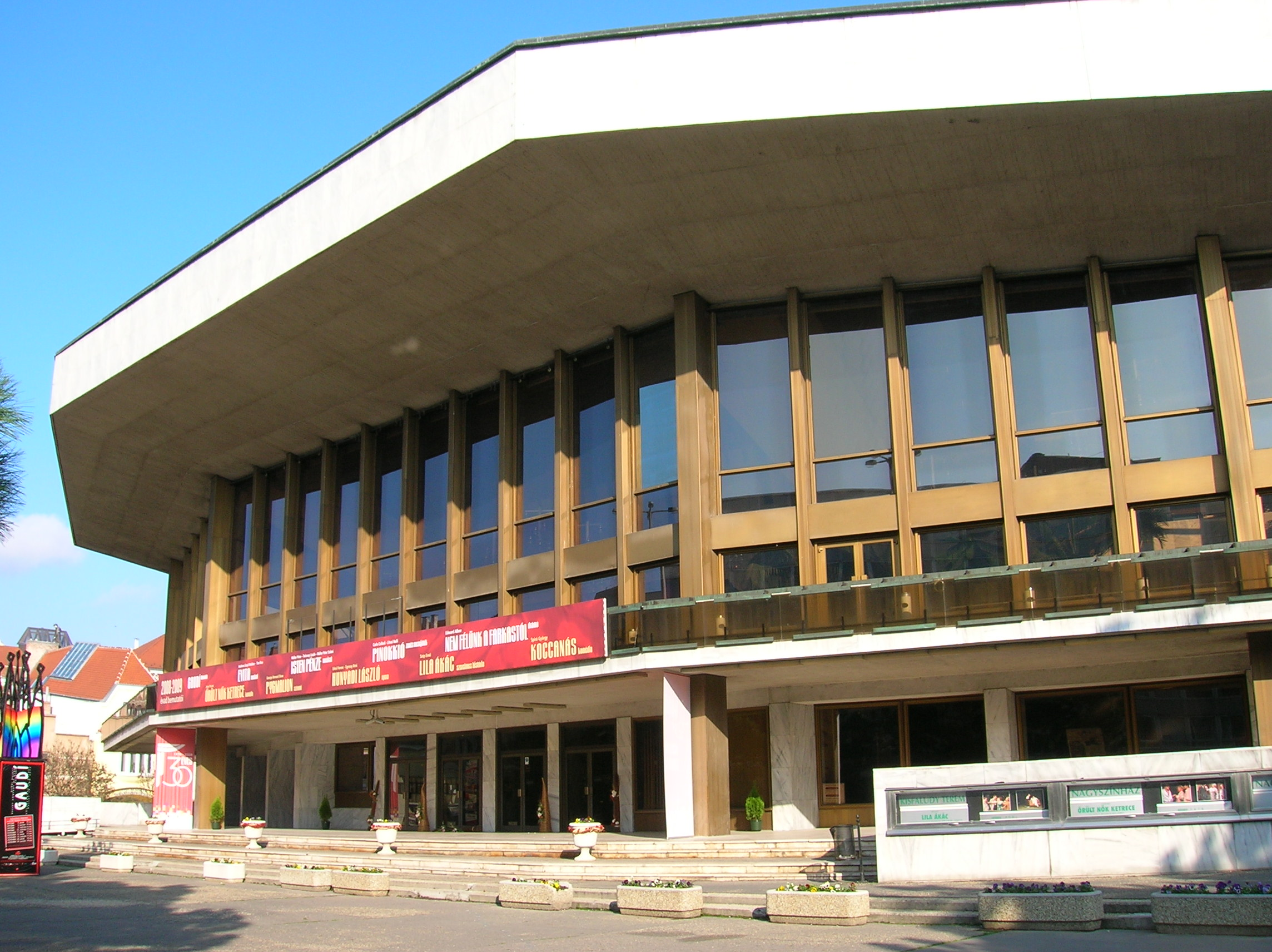
National Theatre, Győr

=== Rest of the country ===
City theatres with permanent company

- Bartók Chamber Theatre and House of Arts of Dunaújváros, Dunaújváros
- Csiky Gergely Theatre of Kaposvár, Kaposvár
- Csokonai Theatre, Debrecen
- Gárdonyi Géza Theatre of Eger, Eger
- German Theatre, Szekszárd
- Hevesi Sándor Theatre of Zalaegerszeg, Zalaegerszeg
- Jászai Mari Theatre of Tatabánya, Tatabánya
- Jókai Theatre of Békéscsaba, Békéscsaba
- Katona József Theatre, Kecskemét
- Móricz Zsigmond Theatre, Nyíregyháza
- National Theatre of Győr, Győr
- National Theatre of Miskolc, Miskolc
- National Theatre of Pécs, Pécs
- National Theatre of Szeged, Szeged
- Petőfi Theatre of Veszprém, Veszprém
- Soproni Petőfi Theatre, Sopron
- Stage of Budaörs, Budaörs
- Szigligeti Theatre, Szolnok
- Third Theatre of Pécs, Pécs
- Vörösmarty Theatre, Székesfehérvár
- Weöres Sándor Theatre, Szombathely

Theatre buildings without permanent company, auditoriums, open-air and summer theatres

- Akropolisz Open-Air Theatre, Miskolctapolca
- Balaton Convention Center and Theatre, Keszthely
- Cave Theatre of Fertőrákos, Fertőrákos
- Court Theatre of Esztergom, Esztergom
- Court Theatre of Gyula, Gyula
- Court Theatre of Kisvárda
- Court Theatre of Kőszeg, Kőszeg
- Hagymaház, Makó
- Karnevál Theatre, Szombathely
- Open-air Theatre of Siófok, Siófok
- Open-air Theatre of Szeged, Szeged
- Pannon Court Theatre, Veszprém
- Summer Court Theatre of Siklós, Siklós
- Summer Theatre of Zala, Zalaegerszeg
- Summer Theatre of Zsámbék, Zsámbék
- Theatrum of Szentendre, Szentendre

== Alternative theatres ==
=== Budapest ===
- 7 Főszín Company
- Andaxínház
- Aranyszamár Theatre
- Art Plaza
- Arvisura Theatrei Company
- Atlantis Theatre
- Atlasz Gábor Company
- Babszem Jankó GyermekTheatre
- Bácskai Júlia Psycho Theatre
- Baltazár Theatre
- Bálványos Company
- DNS Társulás
- Eleuszisz Theatre
- Gózon Gyula Chamber Theatre
- Hattyú Dal Theatre
- Híd Theatre
- Holdvilág Chamber Theatre
- Homo Ludens Musical Stage, Szombathely
- Hólyagcirkusz
- Junion Theatre
- Kas Theatre
- Kincses Theatre
- Kompánia Theatre Company
- Kókai János Company
- Körmendi Alternatív Theatre Company of Körmend
- Kuckó Művésztanya
- Levendula Theatre
- Maladype Theatre
- Maskarás Céh
- Mándy Ildikó Company
- Merlin Theatre
- Mozgó Ház
- Mu Theatre
- Nevesincs Theatre
- Paál István Studio Theatre
- Pasztell Theatre
- Pintér Béla Company
- Pont Műhely
- R.S.9. Studio Theatre
- Street Theatre of Budapest
- Stúdió K
- Szárnyak Theatrea
- Szív Chamber Theatre
- Szkéné Theatre
- TÁP Theatre
- Theatre of Fogi
- Theatrical Workshop of Szentkirály
- Trambulin Theatre
- Turay Ida Theatre
- Vakrepülés Company
- Várszegi Tibor Company
- Zug Theatre

=== Rest of the country ===
- Berzsenyi Szinpad, Szombathely
- Civitas PinceTheatre, Sopron
- Croat Theatre of Pécs, Pécs
- Éjfél Theatre, Gödöllő
- Ferrum Társulás, Szombathely
- Homo Ludens Project, Szeged
- Janus University Theatre, Pécs
- KAS Theatre, Sopron
- KonzervArtaudrium Theatrei Műhely, Debrecen
- Prospero Company, Székesfehérvár
- Soltis Lajos Theatre, Celldömölk
- Teatro Capriccio Tent Theatre, Vigántpetend
- Tintaló Company, Kecskemét
- Weöres Sándor Regional Theatre, Szarvas
- Youth Actor Company of Pécs, Pécs

== Movement and dance theatres ==
- Balett of Győr (National Theatre of Győr)
- Balett of Pécs (National Theatre of Pécs)
- Bozsik Yvette Company
- Budapest Balett
- Budapest Dance Theatre
- Dance Theatre of Dunaújváros
- Duna Art Company
- Experidance
- Ékszer Balett Dance Company
- Frenák Pál Company
- Goda Gábor Company
- Honvéd Dance Theatre
- Middle-Europe Dance Theatre
- L1 táncMűvek
- Hungarian Festival Balett
- Hungarian National Balett (Magyar Állami Operaház)
- Hungarian National Folk Ensemble
- Még 1 Mozdulatszínház
- National Dance Theatre
- Sámán Theatre
- Somi Panni és a Sivasakti Kalánanda Dance Theatre
- Szeged Contemporary Dance Company (National Theatre of Szeged)
- TranzDanz
- Vision Dance Theater

== Puppet theatres ==
- Budapest Puppet Theatre
- Bóbita Puppet Theatre, Pécs
- Ciróka Puppet Theatre, Kecskemét
- Csodamalom Puppet Theatre, Miskolc
- Fabula Puppet Theatre
- Harlekin Puppet Theatre
- Kincses Theatre
- Kövér Béla Puppet Theatre, Szeged
- Maskara Company
- Mesebolt Puppet Theatre
- Mikropódium Családi Puppet Theatre
- Nefelejcs Puppet Theatre
- Nevesincs Színház
- Óperenciás Puppet Theatre
- Vaskakas Puppet Theatre, Győr
- Vojtina Puppet Theatre, Debrecen
