= Power Center for the Performing Arts =

Performing arts center at the University of Michigan

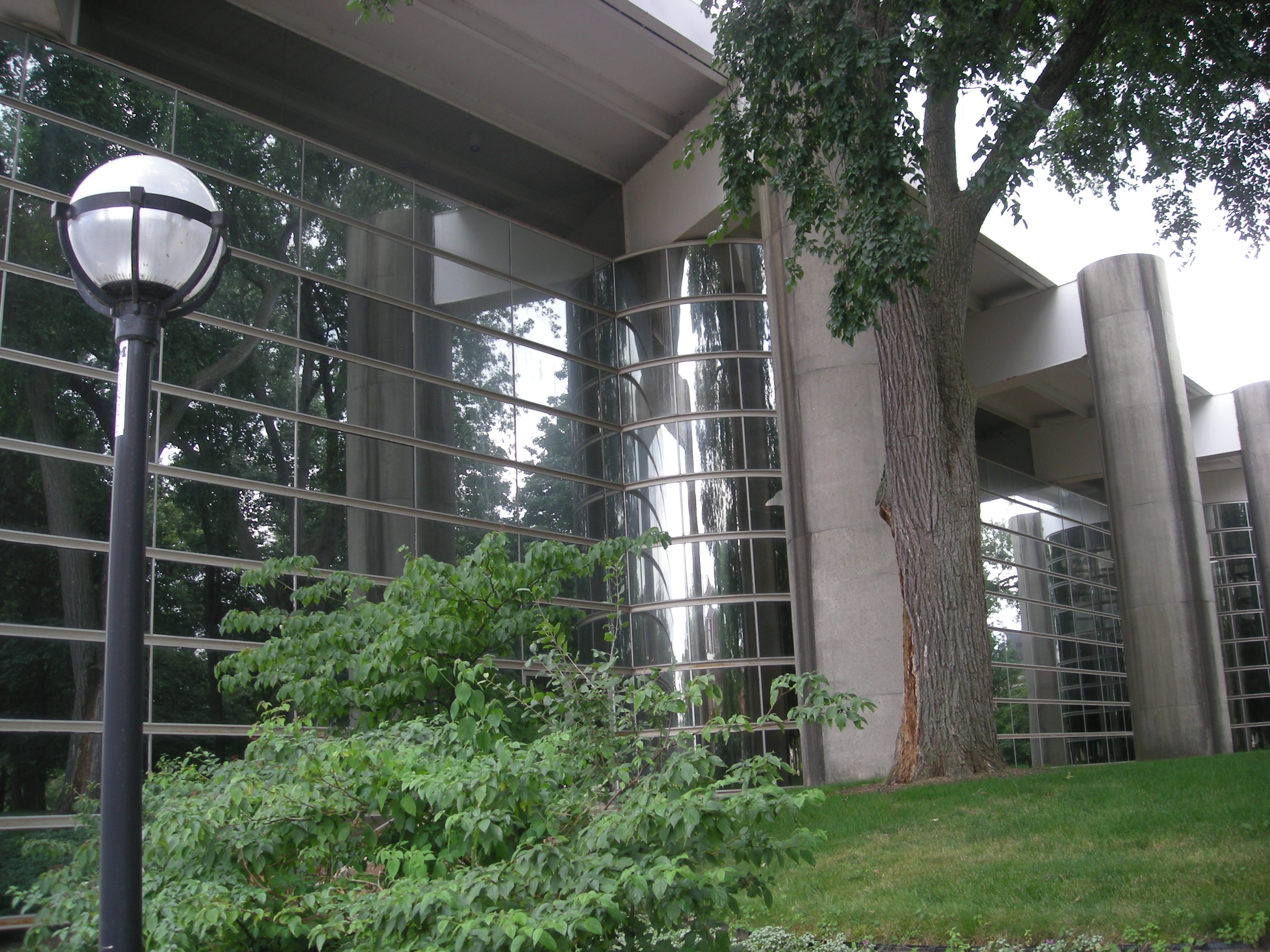
- The Power Center in 2013
- Interactive map of Power Center for the Performing Arts
- Address: 121 Fletcher Street; Ann Arbor, Michigan; United States
- Coordinates: 42.2808°N 83.7358°W
- Owner: University of Michigan
- Operator: University of Michigan
- Capacity: 1,300
- Type: Performing arts center

Construction
- Opened: 1971
- Architect: Kevin Roche John Dinkeloo and Associates

The Power Center for the Performing Arts is a performing arts center on the central campus of the University of Michigan in Ann Arbor, Michigan. Opened in 1971, the venue was designed by Kevin Roche John Dinkeloo and Associates as a proscenium-stage theater for university and professional performances.

== History ==
The Power Center originated from the University of Michigan's need for a medium-sized proscenium-stage theater. According to the university, Hill Auditorium was too large and technically limited for many productions, while the Lydia Mendelssohn Theatre was too small. In 1963, Eugene and Sadye Power and their son Philip expressed interest in supporting a new theater project at the university.

The Power family made major gifts toward the project, and construction began in 1969. Michigan Modern, a project of the Michigan State Historic Preservation Office, states that the Power family contributed $3 million for the theater and that the university added another $500,000. The building opened in 1971 with the world premiere of The Grass Harp, based on the novel by Truman Capote.

The center is named for Eugene and Sadye Power. Eugene B. Power, a University of Michigan alumnus and former regent, founded University Microfilms, later part of ProQuest. Sadye Power, also a University of Michigan alumna, worked as a clinical psychologist and was active in women's causes.

== Architecture ==
The Power Center was designed by Kevin Roche John Dinkeloo and Associates, with theater-design work by Jo Mielziner. The building is located near Fletcher Street and Washtenaw Avenue on the edge of Felch Park, a green space on the university's central campus.

The building is noted for its reflective glass lobby, concrete columns, and large windowless auditorium and stage-house volumes. Michigan Modern describes the theater lobby as a large rectangular volume facing the park, with mirrored glass walls intended to reflect the surrounding trees and make the green space appear larger. SAH Archipedia describes the building as a steel-reinforced concrete and reflective-glass performing arts center, with six massive columns creating the effect of an abstracted classical colonnade.

Inside, the lobby includes two freestanding spiral staircases leading to steel-reinforced walkways above the lobby. The theater contains 1,420 seats arranged in a broad semicircle, and its orchestra pit can be raised to convert the proscenium stage into a thrust stage. The University of Michigan describes the performance hall as having approximately 1,300 seats and says that no seat is more than 72 feet from the stage.

The Michigan Architectural Foundation lists the building among its "Must See Buildings", identifying Kevin Roche as architect, Ann Arbor as its location, and 1970–1971 as its completion period.

== Construction and facilities ==
O'Neal Construction, the general contractor for the project, describes the Power Center as a 55,000-square-foot performing arts center with 1,450 seats. Michigan Modern identifies Associated Engineers as structural engineers, John Altieri as mechanical, electrical, and plumbing engineer, and O'Neal Construction as general contractor.

According to O'Neal Construction, the project included 100-foot stage tower walls without intermediate support and concrete spiral stairs.

== Use ==
The Power Center hosts productions and events connected with the University of Michigan School of Music, Theatre, and Dance, University Musical Society, and Ann Arbor Summer Festival. The university describes the venue as a performance hall intended to bridge the scale between Hill Auditorium and the Lydia Mendelssohn Theatre.
