= List of theaters in North Carolina =

Theatre venues in North Carolina include:

- In Charlotte
  - Actor's Theatre of Charlotte
  - Carolina Actors Studio Theatre
  - ImaginOn
  - Blumenthal Performing Arts Center
  - Theatre Charlotte
  - Charlotte Shakespeare
- In Durham
  - Durham Performing Arts Center
- In Flat Rock
  - Flat Rock Playhouse, the state theatre of North Carolina
- In Hayesville
  - Peacock Performing Arts Center
- In Murphy
  - Henn Theater
- In Wilmington
  - Thalian Hall, opened 1858.
  - Hannah Block Second Street Stage.

== See also ==
- Theatre in the United States
