= Dahuting =

Eastern Han dynasty tombs in Henan

- Traditional Chinese: 打虎亭漢墓
- Simplified Chinese: 打虎亭汉墓
Transcriptions
Standard Mandarin
- Hanyu Pinyin: Dáhǔtíng hànmù
- Bopomofo: ㄉㄚˊ ㄏㄨˇ ㄊㄧㄥˊ ㄏㄢˋ ㄇㄨˋ
- Wade–Giles: Ta^{2}-hu^{3}-t‘ing^{2} han^{4}-mu^{4}
- IPA: [tǎ.xù.tʰǐŋ xân.mû]
Yue: Cantonese
- Yale Romanization: Dáfútìhng honmouh
- Jyutping: daa2 fu2 ting4 hon3 mou6
- IPA: [ta˧˥.fu˧˥.tʰɪŋ˩ hɔn˧.mɔw˨]

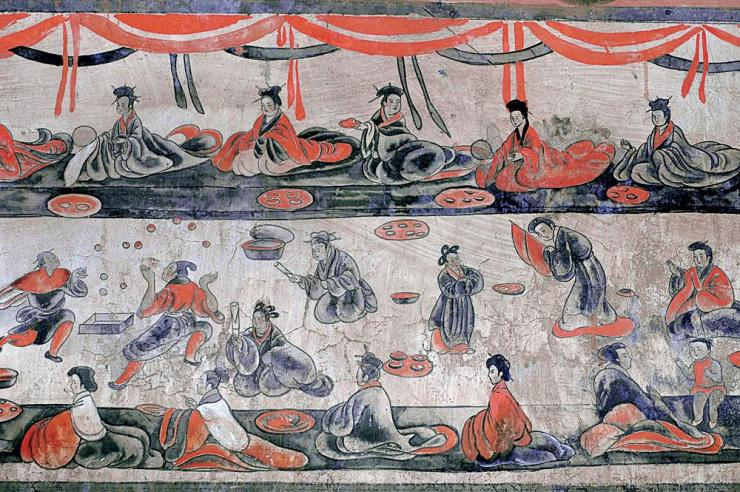
Banquet scene with jugglers

The Dahuting Han tombs are Eastern Han dynasty (1st century AD) tombs of Zhang Boya and his wife, in modern Xinmi, Henan Province. They are famous for their well-preserved murals and stone carvings.

== Discovery and history ==
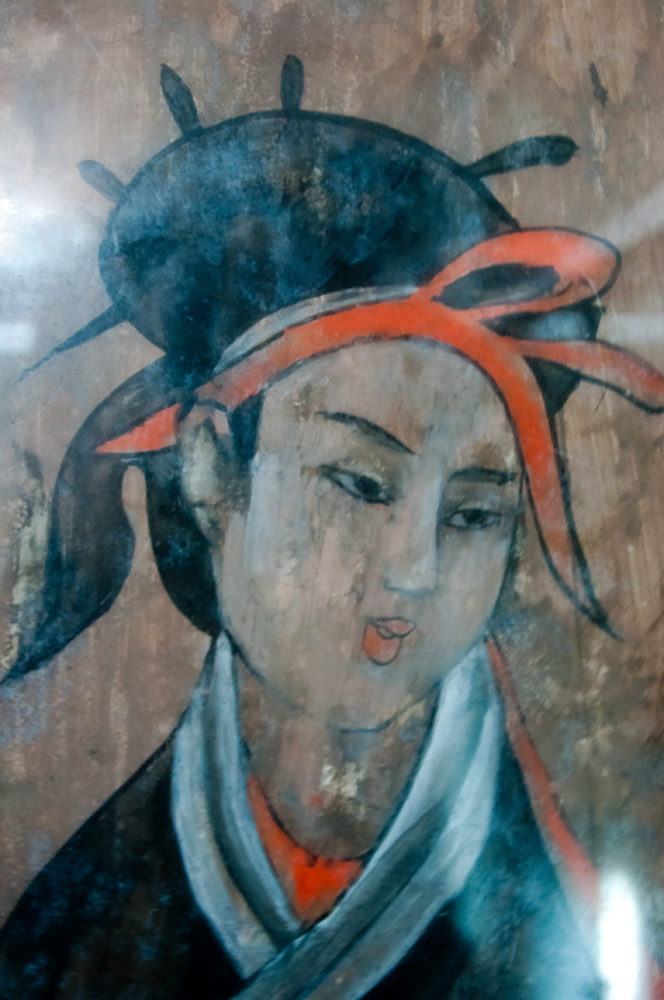
Mural detail of a woman

In December 1959, construction workers digging west of Dahuting Village in Mi County (now Xinmi), Henan Province, encountered the southern limits of two subterranean tombs built of stone and brick. The Institute of Cultural Relics of Henan Province excavated the two tombs, designated M1 and M2, from February to December 1961. Subsequent excavations of the area beginning in the autumn of 1977 revealed nine satellite burials surrounding M1 and M2. A report on tombs M1 and M2 was published by Cultural Relics Publishing, Beijing in 1993. The report contains rubbings, line drawings and black and white and color photos keyed to the scale architectural blueprints. Through this combination of media, the correspondence between the decorative programs of the tombs and their built structure is clearly illustrated and contextualized.

Searching to identify the occupants of the tombs, archaeologists consulted the Commentary on the Water Classic, which includes a description of two tombs located on the southern bank of the Sui River. The text describes two tombs surrounded by a wall and including a shrine, two stone towers, animal and human stone guardian figures. It identifies the occupants of M1 as Zhang Boya, Governor of Hongnong Commandery, and his wife.

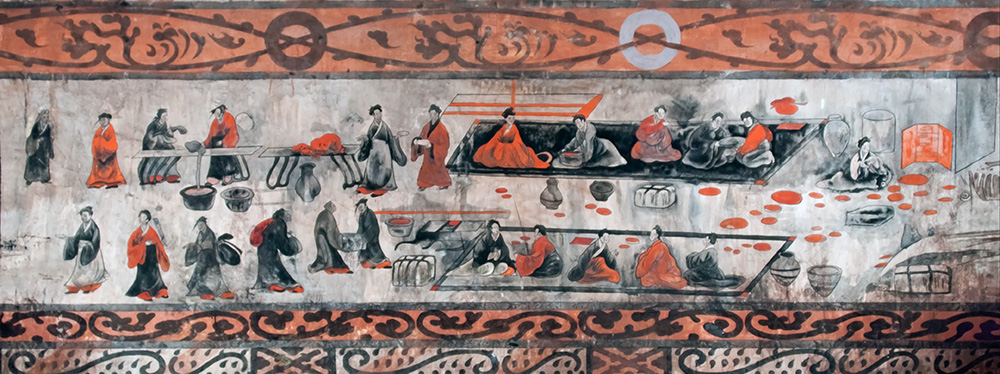
Banquet scene

Dahuting M1 was a gift from the throne presented to Zhang in recognition of service to the emperor during the power struggle that led to the establishment of the Eastern Han. Liu Xiu became the first emperor of the Eastern Han dynasty after defeating the regent Wang Mang. During a critical battle, Liu Xiu was pursued by Wang Mang's troops and sought shelter in Zhang's house. Zhang disguised himself by using Liu Xiu's clothing and went out to engage Wang Mang in battle. Liu Xiu escaped as Zhang met death on the field. After Liu ascended to the throne as Emperor Guangwu (r. 25–57 CE), he ordered that Zhang be buried near his ancestral home in a tomb constructed at imperial expense. In this way, the emperor accomplished a return of grace or baoen, repaying Zhang's act in life with posthumous reward affecting his afterlife.

== Tombs ==
Tombs M1 (in the west) and M2 (in the east) house matching subterranean burial structures of Zhang Boya and his wife, with mounds rising 10 and 7.5 meters respectively above the ground. The tombs share the same basic building techniques, structure and shape. Both are constructed of rectangular stone slabs and square and V-shaped blue bricks. The vaulted ceilings and paved paths are made of V-shaped stone slabs and bricks. The walls and floors are made of rectangular stone slabs and bricks joined with lime-white mortar. The three main chambers of the structures are laid out along a south–north axis connected by paved paths and separated by carved stone doors with thresholds. Tomb M1 is significantly larger than tomb M2.

Access to the tombs is achieved by descending sloping passages. The outer doors of the tombs are constructed of carved stone slabs and carved with a centrally positioned door ring motif. The differences between the two tombs are most apparent in their scale and decorative programs. The decorative program of tomb M1 is carved stone reliefs, while M2 is decorated in frescoes rendered in a layer of line. In both tombs, the images of the decorative programs correspond to the function of the chambers.

The tomb was robbed of its furnishings before modern archaeological excavations.

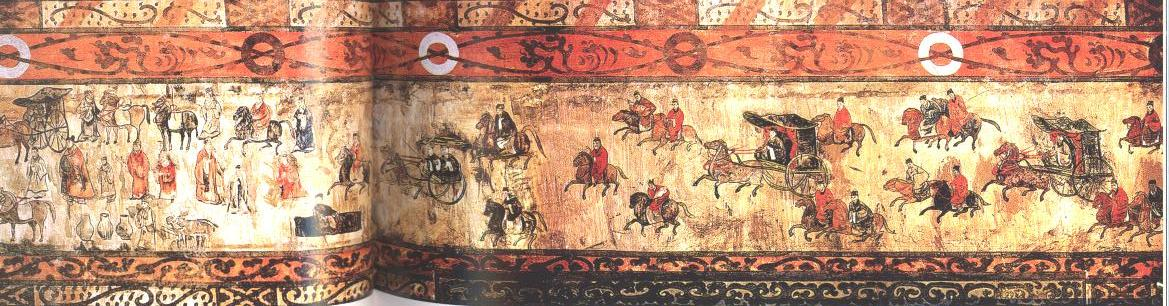
Mural of chariots and cavalry
