= Budapest Puppet Theatre =

Coordinates: 47°30′26″N 19°04′01″E

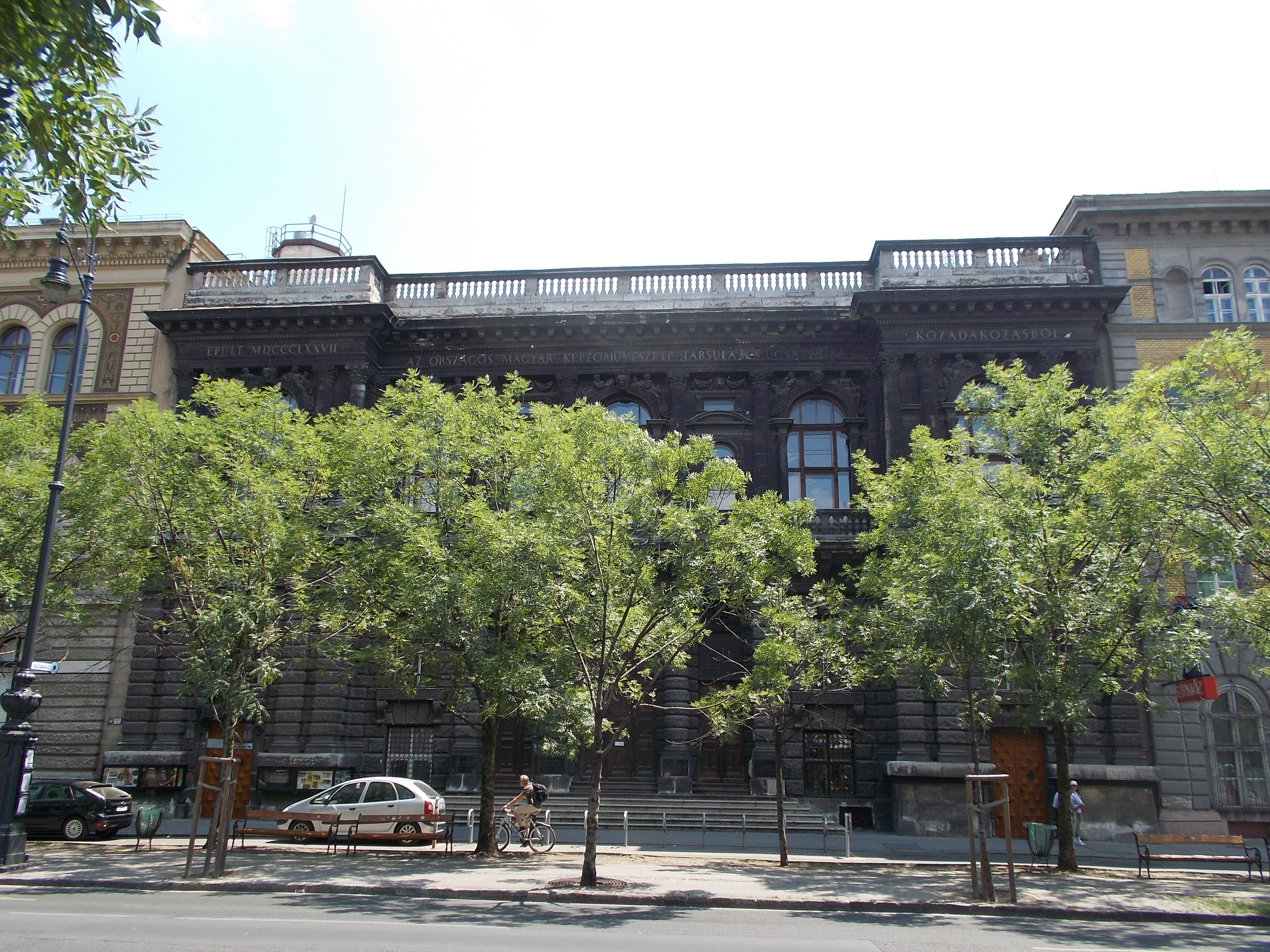
Andrássy Avenue 69.

The Budapest Puppet Theater (Hungarian: Budapest Bábszínház) has been open since 1949, with its primary venue currently situated at 69 Andrássy út, Budapest. Since then, both children and adults are warmly welcome to their performances, because they have a motto that “the puppet is not the matter of age, but a genre.”

== History of Theatre ==
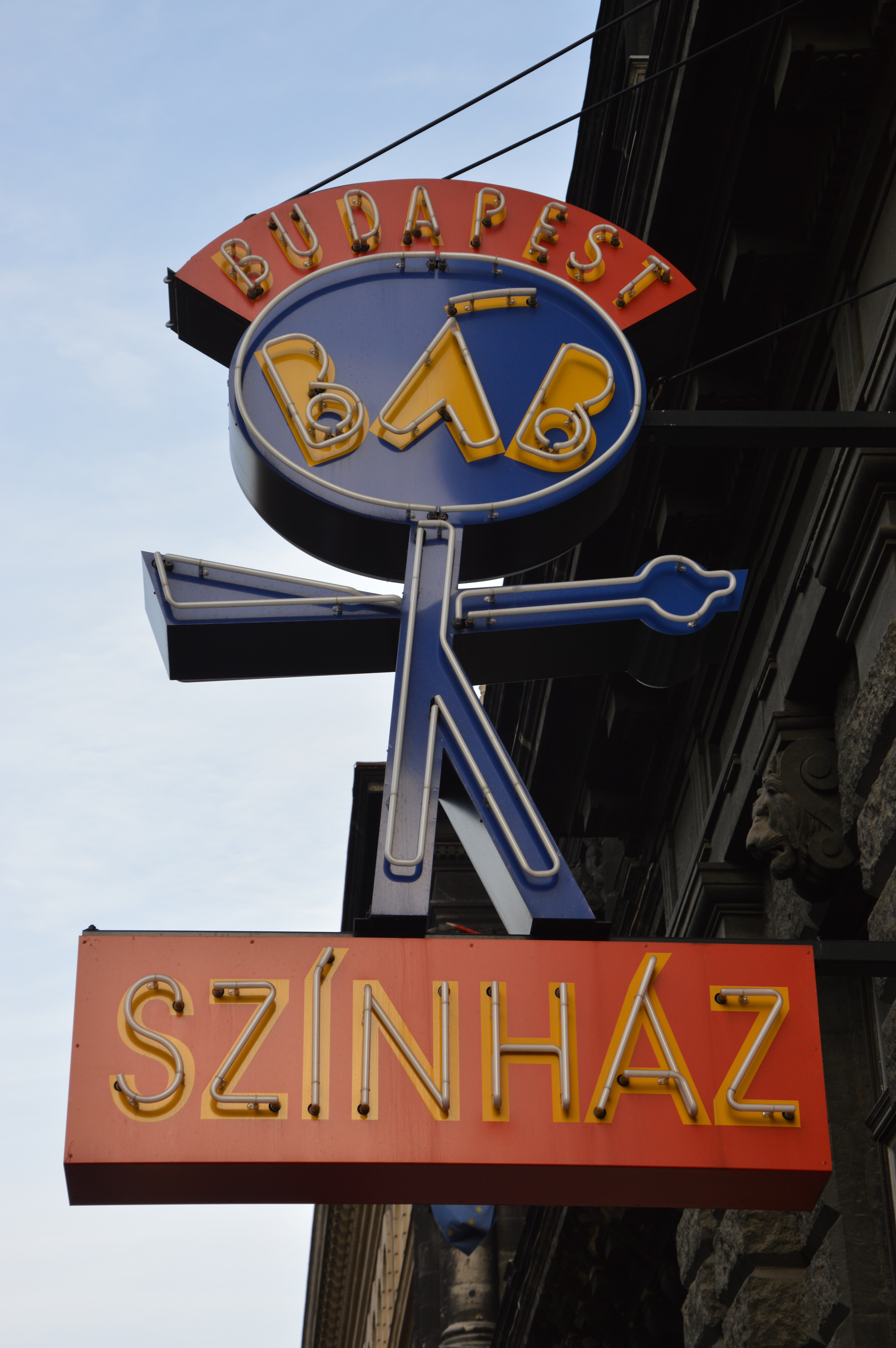
The former sign of Budapest Puppet Theater

The Budapest Puppet Theater is the biggest institution of its kind in Central-Europe and the oldest professional puppet theater in Hungary. It is open since 1949 and has been performing for its audience with the motto, “the puppet is not the matter of age, but a genre.” The theater's main tasks are to introduce children to the theater and also to make experiments besides keeping the well-established traditions. One can play with puppets in a thousand ways. Since the theatre has been established, they performed with hand and rod puppets hiding behind the screen, dressed up in black velvet to create the perfect illusion with the puppets held out in the light. They have manipulated marionette figures from above, shadow figures from behind, bunraku puppets on the table and giant puppets from inside masks. Fashion changes, traditions are being born and forgotten, but one thing has never changed, the spell of magic of revival of a lifeless animated object for children and adults.

The State Puppet Theater opened on 8 October 1949, and it was renamed in 1992 as Budapest Puppet Theater. Not only did the performances for children make the theater famous worldwide, but also the plays created for adults. It has proven the legitimacy and equality of puppetry with other genres of performing arts with the help of sovereign puppet versions of classic dramas and classical pieces. The biggest successes of the company are linked to the unique definitions of classical music adaptations on all the five continents.

The theater's company has three stages to play: the main stage, which has around 400 seats, the Ország Lili Studio, which can be rearranged in several styles. This has 100 seats. The newest, Kemény Henrik Room, has been opened in 2017. The theater has 360-380 performances yearly, which means that they accommodate 100,000 viewers in every theater season.

Their foyer houses a gallery named after Koós Iván, one of the most influential puppet and set designers in Hungary. The carefully timed and thermalized exhibitions put an emphasis on the representation of the past and present of puppetry as an art form showing the designs and works of emblematic puppet designers and theatre companies.

In 2010 a festival, called BÁBU was established. Its aim is to perform chamber-puppet shows created by pioneer theater companies for adolescent and adult audiences in Budapest. The Budapest Puppet Theater initiated the celebration of World Puppet Day on March 21 in 2014 and since then Hungarian puppet artists in the country and abroad organize feasts and flash mobs. With these series of events the organizers are keen to put an emphasis on the colorfulness of the Hungarian Puppet art, on its own institutions and independent companies and also on the actors who are valuable parts of the productions. On this day the professional and amateur companies, educational institutions and one man shows get the chance to introduce themselves and entertain their audience outside of the buildings of puppet theaters.

=== 70 years anniversary ===
The State Puppet Theater was established on September 1, 1949, and its predecessor was the Fairy Tale Cave, nationalized for the second time, which operated for only one and a half years on the second floor of the Art Theater which is the former Parisien Grill. The only official puppet theater in Hungary immediately moved to 69 Andrássy Avenue, in place of the former National Chamber Theater. In accordance with the cultural policy of that time, at first only pieces for children were shown, even though the new leadership wanted to take a different direction. It was only two years later, from 1951, that it became possible to add adult performances to the repertoire, and since then, the pieces have been produced in the spirit of their motto, “the puppet is not the matter of age, but a genre.”

Until 1958, there was an uncertain period, several directors and chief directors exchanged, and the composition of the company changed constantly too. However, some highly successful performances have shown that Budapest audiences are interested in puppeteer productions: for example, the Star Parade has had snaking lines in front of the cash register for years.

In August 1958, a new era began, with the appointment of Dezső Szilágyi stability and peaceful developments started. In the early years, the Győr State Puppet Theater's program provided the major part of the show, but from 1964, using a completely new language for their repertoire they introduced musical theater performances. It brought amazing success that made Andrassy út the leading puppet theater in Europe in the seventies. This is where Petruska (1965), The Prince of Wood (1965), The Wonderful Mandarin (1969), and János Háry (1972), often still mentioned, were born.

From 1971 the theater moved to Jókai Square for five years. The new playhouse which was built on the site of the old theater was finished in December 1976. From then on, the contemporary playhouse operated as the chamber theater of the State Puppet Theater.

By the end of the seventies, the genre had been completely renewed in Europe. More and more people questioned the legitimacy of the former illusion theater, many open forms appeared and the animators themselves became more prominent, and it was no longer unusual to see them in a show. In Hungary, puppetry did not develop at this pace, thus the State Puppet Theater program lost its spirit of experimenting, so it was not at all surprising that a group of young artists working here left the institution and established their own workshop in Kecskemét. After the change of the regime, more and more companies were formed, among whom some still represented the traditional methods.

Szilágyi retired in 1992, and he was replaced by Iván Koós and László Villányi, the former was responsible for the artistic level, the latter took care of the smooth running of the business, but by the end of the first joint season it became apparent that this line was inoperable. In the same year the name of the institution changed, and the theater continues to function as the Budapest Puppet Theater.

In 1994 the Arany János Theater, the only children's theater in the country, was abolished, giving the two puppet theaters in Budapest an even greater responsibility to serve the needs of the youngest. In the same year, János Meczner, former director of the Arany János Theater, won the management of the Andrássy Avenue institution. He took over the theater in a time of crisis and it was him who had to make some changes in order to keep up with the constant development of the genre, while preserving its enduring values.

== Ars Poetica ==
The main aim of the Budapest Puppet Theater is to raise attention of children towards theater, make them love the genre and to form their theatrical taste. The Budapest Puppet Theater has been performing for over seven decades and it has a special place in the capital city's cultural life. Their job is notable because 80% of their viewers are kindergarten kids or elementary school students, who usually receive their first theater experience in the Puppet Theater.

The Puppet Theater is not just a place for entertainment, but also an educational venue. Besides composing the repertory with a literary and artistic concern, both pedagogical and psychological aspects are also considered in the material. A clear description is given to every performance for the audience to be able to decide, which age they are recommended, but those are the best children plays which can be enjoyed by the parents and teachers too. The Budapest Puppet Theater is strongly committed to the idea that the genre of the puppet is for every age-group this is why they constantly expand their repertory to draw the attention of the adult audience as well.

Artists working in the Budapest Puppet Theater do not see puppetry as a form, but as an endless source of possibilities. A change of paradigms has taken place in the past 25 years both in the European and in the Hungarian art of puppetry. Puppetry integrates the fellow art forms, and it is more and more common, that classical theatre and dance productions add extra puppet elements in their shows.

The puppet genre is capable of methods of expression that the live theater cannot manage to do due to its limitations. Puppet performances compete with the 21st century visual imagery. It is done paradoxically based on a more than hundred year of traditional techniques, focusing on preservation and renaissance at the same time.

The Budapest Theater is open-minded and ready to learn. It has well-trained and devoted actors whose work is guarantee for the high quality of the performances and the possibility of improvement.

== Actors - 2019 ==
- Norbert Ács
- Eszter Bánky
- Zsombor Barna
- Gábor Beratin
- Edina Ellinger
- Zoltán Hannus
- Károly Hoffer
- Ibolya Juhász
- Borbála Karádi
- István Kemény
- Judit Kovács
- Katalin Kovács
- Sándor Márkus
- Alma Virág Pájer
- Mara Pallai
- Gergő Pethő
- Rita Radics
- Judit Rusz
- Nóra Semjén
- Anna Spiegl
- Tibor Szolár
- Zsolt Tatai
- Csaba Teszárek

== Repertoire - 2019 ==
- Adventures of Batu-ta
- Alaine
- An Abrupt And
- Around the World in Eighty Days
- Bambi
- Boribon and Annipanni
- CUBiX
- Father's Daughter
- Gangsta Granny
- Giraffe
- Háry János
- Magic Flute
- Meet Fred
- Mother Holle
- Nothing
- Nutcracker
- Once Upon a
- Peter Rabbit
- Pettson and Findus
- Pip and Posy
- Poor Johnny and Arnica
- Squirrel Misi Sets out
- The Bow Fairy
- The Imaginary Invalid
- THE LAKE
- The robber Hotzenplotz
- The Seven Headed Fairy
- The Star-Eyed Shepherd
- The Tempest
- The Tragedy of Man
- What is Alma Thinking about?

== Awards ==
=== 1999 ===
The Budapest Puppet Theater Company

For Budapest Prize: “For the education of children in Budapest, a 50-year mission with national and international prestige.”

=== 2009 ===
The Budapest Puppet Theater Company

Patron of the Hungarian Center of the UNIMA International Puppet Association

Ministerial recognition of the Ministry of Education and Culture

Pro Scholis Urbis Public Foundation Pro Scholis Urbis Prize: “With their performances, the children's ages enrich the cultural and theater visits. It contributes to the entertaining education and education of children and students. ”

=== 2010 ===
Lyric and Epic

Grand Prize of the 43rd PIF International Beer Festival (Zagreb), best director and best puppet award

Special Special Prize of the Jury in Kaposvár, at the Biennial of the ASSITEJ Biennial of the 5th International Children's and Youth Theater

Best Performance and Best Puppet Award at the 17th International Children's Theater Festival in Subotica

=== 2011 ===
On the rim of the dawn star

The special prize of the Ministry of National Resources is a fascinating poetry of contemporary poetry, with the pleasure of playing the space in the VI. Children's and Youth Theater View

=== 2012 ===
The Seven-Headed Fairy

Üveghegy prize – the best children's theater performance in Kaposvár, VI. At the International Biennial of Children's and Youth Theater ASSITEJ

=== 2013 ===
John is a soldier

Best Director Award at Jakarta, the Wayang World Puppet Festival

Nothing

Officers Critics Award in the Best Child / Youth Performance Class

=== 2014 ===
The Seven-Headed Fairy

Best Achievement Award at the Harmony World Puppet Carnival Festival in Bangkok

Matyi Lúdas

The special prize of the Ministry of National Economy is VII. Children's and Youth Theater View

Best Female Formation (Judit Kovács) and Best Male Formation (Zsolt Tatai) at the 13th International Children's Theater Festival in Banja Luka

Nothing

Károly Hoffer – Offering the Local Government of Budapest – Pál Lengyel Award is the best director of the VII. ASSITEJ Kaposvár's Children's and Youth Theater Biennale

Glass Hill Award – Offering the Local Government of the Municipality of Budapest and the Local Government of Kaposvár County Law for the outstanding theater performance of the VII. ASSITEJ Kaposvár's Children's and Youth Theater Biennale

Boribon and Annipanni

Glass Hill Award – Offering the Local Government of the Capital of Budapest and the Local Government of Kaposvár County Law Center, the best children's theater performance in the VII. ASSITEJ Kaposvár's Children's and Youth Theater Biennale

Krisztián Lisztopád – Offering the Local Government of Budapest, Iván Koós Award for the best sight of the VII. ASSITEJ Kaposvár's Children's and Youth Theater Biennale

Officers Critics’ Award for the Best Children and Youth Performance Class

Grand Prize at the 21st International Children's Theater Festival in Subotica

Péter Bercsényi – Award for Best Actress at the 21st International Children's Theater Festival in Subotica

=== 2015 ===
Ten stories of happiness

The main prize of the Ministry of National Economy (Best Children's Performance) at the 8th Children and Youth Theater Theater

Oops, oops!

Best Design Award for Károly Hoffer and András Lénárt at the Interlyalka Festival in Ungvár

Cabaret

Officers Critics Award in the Best Music / Entertainment Class

Officer Officers Prize for Péter Bercsényi in the best male subordinate category

The Seven-Headed Fairy

Award for Best Performance, Arrangement, Design and Music, and Award for Acting Composition for Károly Hoffer, Zsolt Tatai and Csaba Teszárek at the Golden Spark Festival in Kragujevac

=== 2016 ===
Oops, oops!

Best Actors Award for István Kemény and Judit Kovács at the 18th Golden Spark Festival in Kragujevac

Snow Queen

Ildikó Kovács Prize for Best Children Theater Performance at the VIII. ASSITEJ International Children's and Youth Theater Biennial in Kaposvár

=== 2017 ===
The Seven-Headed Fairy

Best Actor of Dramaturgy and Best Arrangement in Chisinau under the 9th Guguta Hat at the International Folk Festival
