= Jiangsu Performing Arts Group =

Theater company based in Nanjing, Jiangsu, China

The Jiangsu Performing Arts Group (Chinese: 江苏省演艺集团; pinyin: Jiāngsū Shěng Yǎnyì Jítuán), or JPAG, is a theater company established in 2001 and based in Nanjing, Jiangsu, China. It is one of the largest performing arts groups in China and has won eighteen Plum Blossom Prizes and twenty-one Wen Hua Awards. It has also been named "National Key Enterprise for Cultural Export" six times. The group participates in the Chinese Cultural System Reformation.

== Genres and affiliates ==
The company performs in many genres, including opera, pantomime, folk music, symphony, vaudeville, Peking Opera, Kun Opera, Wuxi Opera, Yangzhou Opera, modern drama, Suzhou-dialect storytelling and ballad singing, and puppet show.

The group owns three theaters: the Zijin Grand Theater, the People's Theater, and Jiang Nan Theater. Its subsidiaries, the Jiangsu Performing Company and the Jiangsu Cultural Audio and Visual Publishing House, engage in research, education, marketing, and the publishing and distribution of audio-visual products, art design, costumes, and light and sound equipment.

=== Peking opera ===
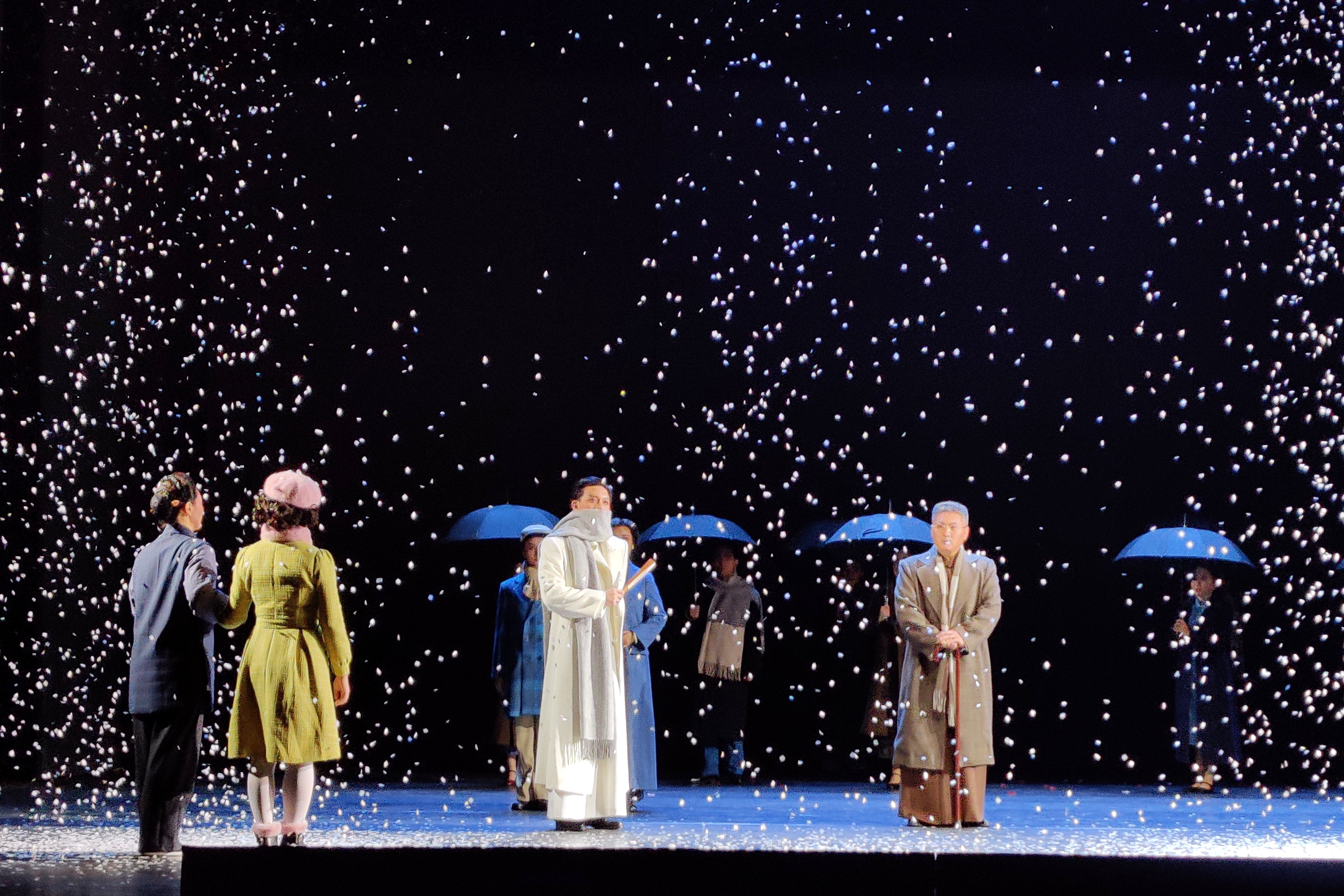
A Peking opera production in Nanjing, 2019.

The Jingju Theater Troupe was founded by the merger of the Southern Jiangsu Peking Opera Troupe and the Northern Jiangsu Experimental Peking Opera Group. In 1953, it was renamed the Jiangsu Peking Opera Troupe. Seven years later, the Nanjing and Yangzhou Peking opera troupes combined with it to form the Jiangsu Province Peking Opera Institute. It has operated for more than fifty years and was named "National Key Peking Opera Troupe" by China's Ministry of Culture in 2005.

Participants have included followers of multiple traditions, such as the Cheng School, Tan School, Wang Qinsheng, Lin School and Zhao Yunhe. As of 2011, there are more than 120 staff members.

The theater has supported the development of many plays that interpret traditional classical works. Examples include The Young Lady Died for Love, Give Bread on Hongqiao, Rickshaw Boy, Wang Xifeng and the Strike in Ningguo Mansion and Tale of the Green Snake.

In 1991 Treasure Candle won the first Cultural New Play Award. Tale of Green Snake won the third Cultural New Play Award in 1993, and in 1995 Xishi Returns to the Country of Yue won the Cheng Changgeng bronze medal at the first Chinese Peking Opera Art Festival. In 2002 the author of The World to the Heart won the outstanding playwright award at the third Peking Opera Art Festival.

=== Kunqu ===
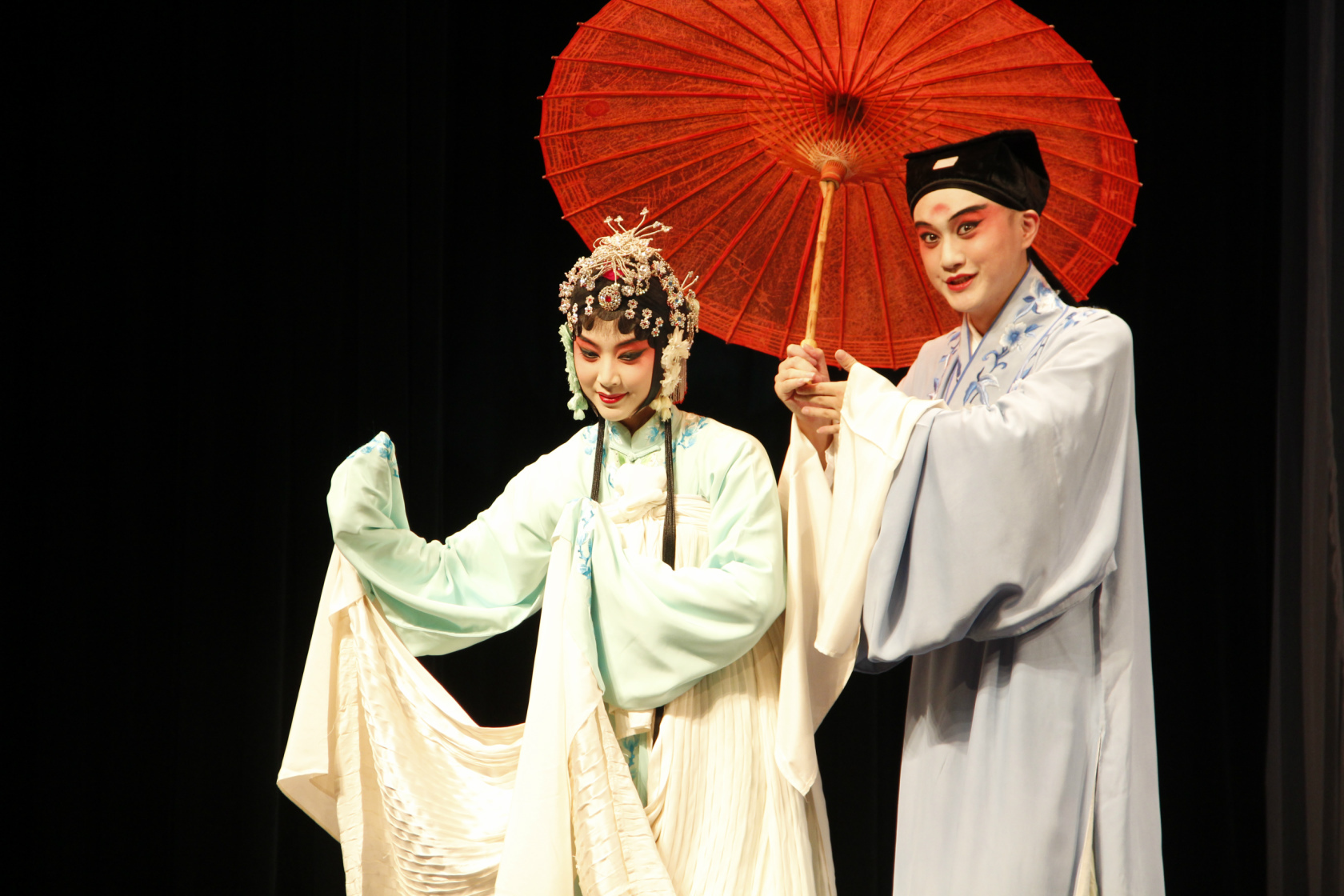
A Kunqu production in Nanjing, 2013. The actress Shan Wen won the Plum Blossom Award in 2019.

Six members of the Kunqu troupe have won the Plum Blossom Award: Zhang Jiqing, Shi Xiaomei, Hu Jinfang, Huang Xiao Wu, and Zhang Jidie. These performers graduated in three different generations (1967, 1985, and 2004) from the Jiangsu Opera School.

Two kinds of performances are presented: selections from the classics, which are performed every week; and full productions adapted for one-, two-, or three-evening performances, which are produced several times a year. Some of the full operas have included The Peony Pavilion and The White Silk Shirt, which won the national prize for Best New Opera.

=== Other troupes ===
- Song and dance
- Modern drama
- Wuxi opera
- Yangzhou opera
- Symphony orchestra
- Traditional Chinese orchestra
- Suzhou Pingtan
- Puppetry
- Feiyang band
- Dance and art design center

== Works ==
The group has a wide repertoire, including the Peking opera The Rickshaw Boy by Lao She; the Kunqu opera Peony Pavilion; What a Beautiful Jasmine, a large song and dance show; the Yangzhou dialect opera Wang Zhaojun; the Wuxi dialect opera Pearl Pagoda; the modern drama Rainbow of the Century; and a series of ancient Suzhou ballads performed as Recollecting Jiangnan in the Ancient Tune of Tang and Song Dynasties.

Starting on 16 February 2016, at Shaw Park Scarborough, Tobago, the JPAG staged a free, two day long cultural exchange event in collaboration with the Chinese Embassy. In 2017, performers from the group staged productions of Peking opera, Kunqu opera, and pipa playing, among others, at the Windhoek.

== Achievements ==
The JPAG has successfully hosted or produced large song and dance shows on both the provincial and national level, including at the 1st China Culture Industry Forum, the opening and closing ceremonies of the 8th Sports Meeting of Chinese Middle School Students, the opening ceremony of the 6th National Paralympics, the exhibition Into the Pyramid - An Exhibition of Ancient Egypt Treasure, and at the Nanjing Ming Dynasty Mausoleum, a World Cultural Heritage site.
