= Jiangsu opera =

Jiangsu opera may refer to several distinct Chinese opera genres from Jiangsu province:

- Kunqu
- Suzhou opera
- Wuxi opera
- Huaihai opera, from northern Jiangsu
- Yangzhou opera, from central Jiangsu
