= Qumushiha =

Chinese politician

- 曲木史哈

Vice Chairman of the Sichuan Provincial Committee of the Chinese People's Political Consultative Conference
- Incumbent
- Assumed office February 2021
- Chairman: Tian Xiangli

Vice Governor of Sichuan
- In office September 2011 – June 2016
- Governor: Jiang Jufeng→Wei Hong

Personal details
- Born: January 1960 (age 66) Yuexi County, Sichuan, China
- Party: Chinese Communist Party
- Education: Southwest Minzu University; Central Party School of the Chinese Communist Party

Military service
- Allegiance: People's Republic of China
- Branch/service: People's Liberation Army Ground Force
- Years of service: 1976–1981
- Unit: PLA 89201 Army

Qumushiha (Chinese: 曲木史哈; pinyin: Qǔmùshǐhā; born January 1960) is a Chinese politician of Yi ethnicity who is vice chairman of the Sichuan Provincial Committee of the Chinese People's Political Consultative Conference. He was an alternate of the 19th Central Committee of the Chinese Communist Party. He was a delegate to the 10th National People's Congress.

== Biography ==
Qumushiha was born in Yuexi County, Sichuan, in January 1960. He enlisted in the People's Liberation Army (PLA) in December 1976, and served in the PLA 89201 Army until January 1981.

He entered politics in January 1981, when he became an official in the United Front Department of CCP Liangshan Yi Autonomous Prefecture Committee. In 1982, he was accepted to Southwest Minzu University, majoring in politics, where he graduated in August 1986. He joined the Chinese Communist Party (CCP) in June 1985. In August 1986, he was assigned to Puge County, where he eventually becoming its assistant magistrate in October 1988. In May 1989, he became deputy magistrate of Xide County, rising to magistrate in March 1990. He served as vice governor of Liangshan Yi Autonomous Prefecture in October 2002, and five months later promoted to the governor position. In December 2004, he became vice director of Sichuan Provincial Development and Reform Commission, in addition to serving as vice governor of Sichuan since September 2011. In May 2016, he was admitted to member of the Standing Committee of the CCP Sichuan Provincial Committee, the province's top authority. In February 2021, he was chosen as vice chairman of the Sichuan Provincial Committee of the Chinese People's Political Consultative Conference, the province's top political advisory body.

Government offices
Preceded by Zhang Zuoha	Governor of Liangshan Yi Autonomous Prefecture; 2003–2004	Succeeded by Zhang Zhitie
Party political offices
Preceded by Li Changping	Director of Rural Work Committee of Sichuan Provincial Committee of the Chinese Communist Party; 2016–2018	Succeeded by Position revoked
Preceded by Wang Minghui	Secretary of the Working Committee of Organs Directly under the Sichuan Provincial Committee of the Chinese Communist Party; 2018–2021	Succeeded by Wang Yihong
