= Wang Minghui =

Chinese politician (born 1960)

- 王铭晖

Vice Chairman of Sichuan People's Congress
- In office May 2020 – January 2022
- Chairman: Peng Qinghua

Personal details
- Born: February 1960 (age 66) Ziyang, Sichuan, China
- Party: Chinese Communist Party (1980–2022; expelled)
- Education: Central Party School of the Chinese Communist Party

Chinese name
- Simplified Chinese: 王铭晖
- Traditional Chinese: 王銘暉
Transcriptions
Standard Mandarin
- Hanyu Pinyin: Wáng Mínghuī

Wang Minghui (Chinese: 王铭晖; born February 1960) is a former Chinese politician who spent his entire career in southwest China's Sichuan province. He was investigated by China's top anti-graft agency in January 2022. Previously he served as vice chairman of Sichuan People's Congress. He is the fourth vice-ministerial level official to be targeted by China's top anticorruption watchdog in 2022, after Zhang Yongze, Wang Bin, and Liu Hongwu. He was a delegate to the 11th and 12th National People's Congress. He is a representative of the 19th National Congress of the Chinese Communist Party.

== Biography ==
Wang was born in Ziyang County (now Ziyang), Sichuan, in February 1960.

He got involved in politics in December 1977, and joined the Chinese Communist Party (CCP) in October 1980. He was deputy party secretary of Ziyang from March 1990 to December 1992 and deputy party secretary of Lezhi County from December 1992 to April 1998. He was appointed deputy party secretary of Neijiang in July 2005, concurrently holding the mayor position. He became deputy secretary-general of CCP Sichuan Provincial Committee and director of its General Office in June 2007, and served until January 2013, when he was made party secretary of Yibin. It would be his first job as "first-in-charge" of a city. In June 2016, he was promoted to become vice governor of Sichuan, concurrently serving as secretary-general of CCP Sichuan Provincial Committee. In May 2020, he took office as vice chairman of Sichuan People's Congress.

=== Downfall ===
On 22 January 2022, he has been placed under investigation for "serious violations of discipline and laws" by the Central Commission for Discipline Inspection (CCDI), the party's internal disciplinary body, and the National Supervisory Commission, the highest anti-corruption agency of China. On 29 July 2022, he was expelled from the CCP and dismissed from public office.

Government offices
Preceded by Ye Zhuang	Mayor of Neijiang; 2005–2007	Succeeded by Liu Chengming
Party political offices
Preceded by Yang Dongsheng (杨冬生)	Communist Party Secretary of Yibin; 2013–2016	Succeeded by Liu Zhongbo (刘中伯)
Preceded by Wu Jinping	Secretary-General of CCP Sichuan Provincial Committee; 2017–2020	Succeeded by Wang Yihong
