= Wu Yiqiang =

Chinese material engineer

- 吴义强
- Born: July 1967 (age 59); Gushi County, Henan, China
- Education: Central South University of Forestry and Technology; Ehime University
- Scientific career
- Fields: Materials science
- Workplaces: Central South University of Forestry and Technology

Chinese name
- Simplified Chinese: 吴义强
- Traditional Chinese: 吳義強
Transcriptions
Standard Mandarin
- Hanyu Pinyin: Wú Yìqiáng

Wu Yiqiang (born July 1967) is a Chinese material engineer who is a professor and former vice president of Central South University of Forestry and Technology, and an academician of the Chinese Academy of Engineering.

== Biography ==
Wu was born in Gushi County, Henan, in July 1967. After graduating from Central South University of Forestry and Technology in 1991, he stayed at the university, where he moved up the ranks to become vice-president in May 2016. He earned his doctor's degree from Ehime University in 2005.

== Honours and awards ==
- 2010 State Science and Technology Progress Award (Second Class)
- 2018 State Science and Technology Progress Award (Second Class)
- 18 November 2021 Member of the Chinese Academy of Engineering (CAE)

Educational offices
Preceded by Liao Xiaoping (廖小平)	President of Central South University of Forestry and Technology; 2022–2024	Succeeded by Qiu Yi (仇怡)
Party political offices
Preceded by Wang Hanqing	Communist Party Secretary of Central South University of Forestry and Technology; 2024–present	Incumbent
