= Liu Hongwu =

Chinese politician (born 1966)

- 刘宏武

Vice Chairman of Guangxi Zhuang Autonomous Region
- In office July 2020 – January 2022
- Chairman: Lan Tianli

Personal details
- Born: December 1966 (age 59) Changyang Tujia Autonomous County, Hubei, China
- Party: Chinese Communist Party (1997–2022; expelled)
- Education: Wuhan University; Cheung Kong Graduate School of Business; Central Party School of the Chinese Communist Party

Chinese name
- Simplified Chinese: 刘宏武
- Traditional Chinese: 劉宏武
Transcriptions
Standard Mandarin
- Hanyu Pinyin: Liú Hóngwǔ

Liu Hongwu (Chinese: 刘宏武; born December 1966) is a former Chinese politician who spent his entire career in southwest China's Guangxi Zhuang Autonomous Region. In January 2022, he was investigated by China's top anti-graft agency. Previously he served as vice chairman of Guangxi Zhuang Autonomous Region. In May 2023, Liu Hongwu was charged with bribery and abuse of power.

Liu is the third vice-ministerial level official to be targeted by China's top anticorruption watchdog in 2022, after Zhang Yongze and Wang Bin. He is so far the second ministerial-level official from Guangxi caught since the 19th National Congress of the Chinese Communist Party in 2017, behind Liu Jun. He is a delegate to the 13th National People's Congress.

== Biography ==
Liu was born in Changyang Tujia Autonomous County, Hubei, in December 1966, the year the Cultural Revolution broke out. In 1985, he was accepted to Wuhan University of Surveying and Mapping Science and Technology (now Wuhan University), majoring in photogrammetry and remote sensing. After university in 1989, he was despatched to the Central South Electric Power Design Institute of Ministry of Energy as a technician.

Liu got involved in politics in June 1993, when he became an official in the Beihai Land Bureau in southwest China's Guangxi Zhuang Autonomous Region. He was vice mayor of Beihai in October 2006 and vice mayor of Hezhou in August 2013. In February 2016, he became deputy director of the Development and Reform Commission of Guangxi Zhuang Autonomous Region, rising to director in February 2018. In July 2020, he rose to become vice chairman of Guangxi Zhuang Autonomous Region, a position at vice-ministerial level.

=== Downfall ===
On 14 January 2022, Liu was put under investigation for alleged "serious violations of discipline and laws" by the Central Commission for Discipline Inspection (CCDI), the party's internal disciplinary body, and the National Supervisory Commission, the highest anti-corruption agency of China. On June 23, he was expelled from the Chinese Communist Party (CCP) and dismissed from public office. On July 13, prosecutors signed an arrest order for him.

In May 2023, in a public trial at Hainan, Liu Hongwu was charged with bribery and abuse of power. The People's Procuratorate of Hainan stated that Liu abused his power from 2005 to 2022 to give favored assistance to people in contracting projects, land development, and obtaining special funds. Moreover, Liu had accepted a total of 83.73 million yuan ($11.77 million) in bribes.

Government offices
Preceded by Huang Fangfang	Director of the Development and Reform Commission of Guangxi Zhuang Autonomous Region; 2018–2021	Succeeded by Tang Yi'ang
