= Suju =

Suju or Su Ju may refer to:

- Suzhou opera
- Super Junior
