= Luo Liangqing =

Chinese politician (born 1959)

- 罗凉清

Governor of Liangshan Yi Autonomous Prefecture
- In office February 2012 – November 2016
- Preceded by: Zhang Zhitie
- Succeeded by: Suga'erbu

Personal details
- Born: October 1959 (age 66–67) Mianning County, Sichuan, China
- Party: Chinese Communist Party
- Education: Southwest University for Nationalities

Chinese name
- Simplified Chinese: 罗凉清
- Traditional Chinese: 羅涼清
Transcriptions
Standard Mandarin
- Hanyu Pinyin: Luó Liángqīng

Luo Liangqing (Chinese: 罗凉清; born October 1959) is a Chinese politician of Yi ethnicity who served as governor of Liangshan Yi Autonomous Prefecture from 2012 to 2016. He was a delegate to the 12th National People's Congress.

== Biography ==
Luo was born in Mianning County, Sichuan, in October 1959. After the Cultural Revolution, he was a sent-down youth from August 1977 to March 1978. In March 1978, he was accepted to Southwest University for Nationalities, where he graduated in 1982. After university, he became a journalist of Liangshan Daily.

Lui began his political career in March 1984, when he was appointed secretary for the Office of Liangshan Yi Autonomous Prefectural People's Government. He joined the Chinese Communist Party (CCP) in September 1985. He was vice governor of Luowugou District in September 1985, in addition to serving as party secretary. In October 1988, he became director of Liangshan Yi Autonomous Prefecture Materials Bureau, rising to director in November 1992. In February 2001, he became vice governor of Liangshan Yi Autonomous Prefecture, a post he kept until August 2005. He was appointed secretary of the Political and Legal Affairs Commission of Liangshan Yi Autonomous Prefecture in August 2005 and was admitted to member of the Standing Committee of the CCP Liangshan Yi Autonomous Prefectural Committee, the prefecture's top authority. He also served his second term as vice governor from January 2007 to November 2011. In November 2011, he was named acting governor, confirmed in February 2012. He was chosen as director of Sichuan Provincial Quality and Technical Supervision Bureau in November 2016, and served until November 2018, when he was made party branch secretary of Sichuan Provincial Market Supervision Administration.

Government offices
Preceded by Zhang Zhitie	Governor of Liangshan Yi Autonomous Prefecture; 2012–2016	Succeeded by Suga'erbu
