= Yang Jian (politician, born 1963) =

Chinese politician

- 杨健

Governor of Dali Bai Autonomous Prefecture
- In office March 2016 – April 2020
- Party Secretary: Chen Jian; Liang Zhimin
- Preceded by: Yang Ning
- Succeeded by: Yang Guozong

Personal details
- Born: October 1963 (age 62–63) Heqing County, Yunnan, China
- Party: Chinese Communist Party (1984–2025; expelled)
- Education: Southwest Minzu University

Chinese name
- Simplified Chinese: 杨健
- Traditional Chinese: 楊健
Transcriptions
Standard Mandarin
- Hanyu Pinyin: Yáng Jiàn

Yang Jian (Chinese: 杨健; born October 1963) is a former Chinese politician of Bai ethnicity who spent his entire career in southwest China's Yunnan province. He was investigated by China's top anti-graft agency in November 2024. He served as governor of Dali Bai Autonomous Prefecture from 2016 to 2020.

== Early life and education ==
Yang was born in Heqing County, Yunnan, in October 1963. In 1981, he enrolled at Southwest Minzu University, where he majored in history.

== Career ==
Yang joined the Chinese Communist Party (CCP) in January 1984, and got involved in politics in July 1985, when he was assigned to the Publicity Department of the CCP Jianchuan County Committee. A year later, he became secretary of the Jianchuan County Committee of the Communist Youth League of China. In January 1987, he was transferred to the Organization Department of the CCP Dali Bai Autonomous Prefectural Committee and subsequently deputy secretary of the Yunnan Dali Bai Autonomous Prefectural Committee of the Communist Youth League of China in July 1995. In August 1997, he became deputy director of the Foreign Affairs Office and deputy director of the Reception Office of Dali Bai Autonomous Prefecture, rising to director the next year. He was appointed party secretary of Xiangyun County in January 2001 and three years later was admitted to standing committee member of the CCP Dali Bai Autonomous Prefectural Committee, the prefecture's top authority. Yang was party secretary of Dali City in October 2004, secretary-general of the CCP Dali Bai Autonomous Prefectural Committee in September 2006, and deputy party secretary of the CCP Dali Bai Autonomous Prefectural Committee in February 2011. In February 2013, he took office as chairman of the Dali Bai Autonomous Prefectural Committee of the Chinese People's Political Consultative Conference, the provincial advisory body. He was deputy party secretary of Dali Bai Autonomous Prefecture in February 2016, in addition to serving as governor since March 2016.

In May 2020, Yang was chosen as vice chairperson of the Environment and Resources Protection Committee of Yunnan Provincial People's Congress.

== Downfall ==
In December 2019, due to inadequate ecological protection work in Erhai Lake and slow progress of some projects, Yang was given a warning and accountability punishment.

On 24 February 2020, with the approval of the CCP Yunnan Provincial Committee, the Yunnan Provincial Commission for Discipline Inspection and Yunnan Provincial Supervisory Commission launched an investigation into the illegal seizure and requisition of epidemic prevention masks from other provinces (cities) passing through Dali City, and imposed a warning and accountability punishment on Yang Jian.

On 14 November 2024, Yang was put under investigation for alleged "serious violations of discipline and laws" by the Central Commission for Discipline Inspection (CCDI), the party's internal disciplinary body, and the National Supervisory Commission, the highest anti-corruption agency of China.

On 14 August 2025, Yang was stripped of his posts within the CCP and in the public office.

Party political offices
Preceded by Cun Weiping	Communist Party Secretary of Xiangyun County; 2001–2004	Succeeded by Wang Ruiyu
Preceded by Yang Zhidong	Communist Party Secretary of Dali City; 2004–2006	Succeeded by Duan Jie
Government offices
Preceded by Yang Ning	Governor of Dali Bai Autonomous Prefecture; 2016–2020	Succeeded by Yang Guozong
