= Guoguo =

Chinese politician

- 果果

Mayor of Lhasa
- In office October 2016 – December 2022
- Party Secretary: Purpu Tonchup
- Preceded by: Zhang Yanqing
- Succeeded by: Wang Qiang (王强)

Personal details
- Born: October 1967 (age 58–59) Maizhokunggar County, Lhasa, Tibet Autonomous Region, China
- Party: Chinese Communist Party (expelled)
- Education: Tibet University; Central Party School of the Chinese Communist Party

Guoguo (Chinese: 果果; pinyin: Guǒguǒ; born October 1967) is a Chinese politician of Tibetan ethnicity. He served as mayor of Lhasa between October 2016 and December 2022. He is deputy director of the Market Supervision Bureau of Tibet Autonomous Region as of February 2023.

He is a delegate to the 13th National People's Congress.

== Early life and education ==
Guoguo was born in Maizhokunggar County, Lhasa, Tibet Autonomous Region, in October 1967.

== Political career ==
Guoguo worked as a secretary in the government of Maizhokunggar County in May 1984. In September 1987, he was assigned to the Organization Department of the CCP Maizhokunggar County Committee, where he eventually becoming deputy head in August 1993. In October 1995, he was appointed deputy secretary of the Lhasa Municipal Committee of the Communist Youth League of China, but having held the position for only two years. In October 1997, he became deputy director of Lhasa Municipal Cultural Bureau, rising to director in March 2005. He was deputy party secretary of Nyêmo County in October 2007, in addition to serving as magistrate. He served as vice mayor of Lhasa in December 2010, and in October 2016 was promoted to the mayor position. He also served as party secretary of Chengguan District from August 2013 to September 2020. He is deputy director of the Market Supervision Bureau of Tibet Autonomous Region as of February 2023.

== Downfall ==
On 23 June 2023, he was suspected of "serious violations of laws and regulations" by the Central Commission for Discipline Inspection (CCDI), the party's internal disciplinary body, and the National Supervisory Commission, the highest anti-corruption agency of China. The official was disclosed he was expelled from the Chinese Communist Party on 21 December 2024, but the details were not disclosed.

Party political offices
Preceded by Phurbu Dongrub	Communist Party Secretary of Chengguan District; 2013–2020	Succeeded by Zhang Zheng
Government offices
Preceded by Zhang Yanqing	Mayor of Lhasa; 2016–2022	Succeeded by Wang Qiang (王强)
