= Zhang Zhitie =

Chinese politician (born 1955)

- 张支铁

Governor of Liangshan Yi Autonomous Prefecture
- In office August 2005 – August 2011
- Preceded by: Qumushiha
- Succeeded by: Luo Liangqing

Personal details
- Born: February 1955 (age 71) Ganluo County, Sichuan, China
- Party: Chinese Communist Party
- Education: Southwest University for Nationalities

Chinese name
- Simplified Chinese: 张支铁
- Traditional Chinese: 張支鐵
Transcriptions
Standard Mandarin
- Hanyu Pinyin: Zhāng Zhītiě

Zhang Zhitie (Chinese: 张支铁; born February 1955) is a Chinese politician of Yi ethnicity who served as governor of Liangshan Yi Autonomous Prefecture from 2005 to 2011. He was a delegate to the 11th National People's Congress.

== Biography ==
Zhang was born in Ganluo County, Sichuan, February 1955. During the Cultural Revolution, he was a sent-down youth from August 1974 to August 1975 in Zhuhe District of Zhaojue County. Then he studied at the Party School of Liangshan Yi Autonomous Prefecture.

After graduating in 1977, he served in several posts in Liangshan Yi Autonomous Prefecture Agricultural School, including teacher, lecturer, and vice president. At the same time, he studied at Southwest University for Nationalities. He joined the Chinese Communist Party (CCP) in June 1985.In March 1990, he became deputy magistrate of Yuexi County, rising to magistrate in March 1993. He was appointed secretary of the Political and Legal Affairs Commission of Liangshan Yi Autonomous Prefecture in December 1995 and was admitted to member of the Standing Committee of the CCP Liangshan Yi Autonomous Prefectural Committee, the prefecture's top authority. He was a visiting scholar at the California State University, Fullerton and Boston University from September 2003 to December 2003. In July 2004, he was chosen as deputy party secretary of Liangshan Yi Autonomous Prefecture. In January 2005, he was named acting governor, confirmed in the following month. He became deputy director of Sichuan Provincial Economic and Information Commission in August 2011, serving in the post until his retirement in July 2015.

Government offices
Preceded by Qumushiha	Governor of Liangshan Yi Autonomous Prefecture; 2005–2011	Succeeded by Luo Liangqing
