= Yishi Dawa =

- 益西达瓦

Director of the Sichuan Provincial Civil Affairs Department
- In office January 2017 – September 2024
- Preceded by: Huang Mingquan
- Succeeded by: Jiang Liying

Governor of Garzê Tibetan Autonomous Prefecture
- In office January 2012 – December 2016
- Preceded by: Li Changping
- Succeeded by: Xiao Youcai

Personal details
- Born: May 1964 (age 62) Batang County, Sichuan, China
- Party: Chinese Communist Party
- Education: Southwest Minzu University

Chinese name
- Simplified Chinese: 益西达瓦
- Traditional Chinese: 益西達瓦
Transcriptions
Standard Mandarin
- Hanyu Pinyin: Yìxī Dáwǎ

Yishi Dawa (Chinese: 益西达瓦; born May 1964) is a former Chinese politician of Tibetan ethnicity who spent his entire career in southwest China's Sichuan province. As of April 2025 he handed himself in to China's top anti-graft watchdog. Previously he served as director of the Sichuan Provincial Civil Affairs Department, and before that, governor of Garzê Tibetan Autonomous Prefecture. He was a delegate to the 12th National People's Congress. He was a member of the 13th National Committee of the Chinese People's Political Consultative Conference.

== Early life and education ==
Yishi Dawa was born in Batang County, Sichuan, in May 1964. In 1982, he enrolled at Southwest Minzu College (now Southwest Minzu University), where he majored in physics. He joined the Chinese Communist Party (CCP) in June 1986 upon graduation.

== Career ==
After university in 1986, Yishi Dawa was assigned as an official to Garzê Tibetan Autonomous Prefecture. In February 1995, he became deputy magistrate of Xinlong County, rising to magistrate in December 1998. In October 2002, he was promoted to party secretary of Daofu County, the top political position in the county. In January 2007 he was admitted to standing committee member of the CCP Garzê Tibetan Autonomous Prefectural Committee, the prefecture's top authority. He also served as president of Garzê Tibetan Autonomous Prefectural Federation of Trade Unions from April 2007 to June 2008 and head of the United Front Work Department of the CCP Garzê Tibetan Autonomous Prefectural Committee from June 2008 to August 2010. He was deputy head of the United Front Work Department of the CCP Sichuan Provincial Committee in August 2010, in addition to serving as director of the Sichuan Provincial Religious Affairs Bureau. In October 2011, he was named acting governor of Garzê Tibetan Autonomous Prefecture, confirmed in January 2012. He was appointed director of the Sichuan Provincial Civil Affairs Department in January 2017, concurrently serving as president of Sichuan Provincial Charity Federation since May 2023.

In December 2024, Yishi Dawa was chosen as vice president of China Charity Federation.

== Downfall ==
On 11 April 2025, Yishi Dawa surrendered himself to the Central Commission for Discipline Inspection (CCDI), the party's internal disciplinary body, and the National Supervisory Commission, the highest anti-corruption agency of China, for "serious violations of discipline and laws".

Government offices
Preceded by Li Changping	Governor of Garzê Tibetan Autonomous Prefecture; 2012–2016	Succeeded by Xiao Youcai
Preceded by Huang Mingquan (黄明全)	Director of the Sichuan Provincial Civil Affairs Department; 2017–2024	Succeeded by Jiang Liying (蒋丽英)
