= Ashilabi =

Chinese politician

- 阿石拉比

Governor of Liangshan Yi Autonomous Prefecture
- Incumbent
- Assumed office January 2022
- Preceded by: Suga'erbu

Personal details
- Born: December 1968 (age 57) Jiulong County, Sichuan, China
- Party: Chinese Communist Party
- Education: Kangding Normal School; Sichuan Normal University

Ashilabi (Chinese: 阿石拉比; pinyin: Āshílābǐ; born December 1968) is a Chinese politician of Yi ethnicity who is the current governor of Liangshan Yi Autonomous Prefecture. He is a representative of the 20th National Congress of the Chinese Communist Party.

== Biography ==
Ashilabi was born in Jiulong County, Sichuan, in December 1968. In 1985, he entered Kangding Normal School. After graduating in 1989, he attended Sichuan Normal University where he obtained his BSc degree in 1993. He joined the Chinese Communist Party (CCP) in September 1992. After university, he worked in affiliated companies of the university until June 2014, when he became a director of Sichuan Airlines Group Co., Ltd..

Ashilabi began his political career in November 2016, when he was admitted to member of the Standing Committee of the CCP Liangshan Yi Autonomous Prefectural Committee, the prefecture's top authority. A month later, he was appointed secretary-general of the Prefectural Party Committee, in addition to serving as party secretary of its State-owned Assets Supervision and Administration Commission. In July 2017, he was made secretary of the Political and Legal Affairs Commission, concurrently serving as deputy party secretary of the prefecture since September 2021. In October 2021, he was named acting governor, confirmed in January 2022.

Government offices
Preceded by Suga'erbu	Governor of Liangshan Yi Autonomous Prefecture; 2022–	Incumbent
