= Purpu Tonchup =

Chinese politician

- ཕུར་བུ་དོན་གྲུབ་

Communist Party Secretary of Lhasa
- In office 11 April 2022 – 8 October 2023
- Preceded by: Yan Jinhai
- Succeeded by: Xiao Youcai

Personal details
- Born: November 1972 (age 53) Gyantse County, Tibet Autonomous Region, China
- Party: Chinese Communist Party
- Education: Tibet University; Central Party School of the Chinese Communist Party

Chinese name
- Simplified Chinese: 普布顿珠
- Traditional Chinese: 普佈頓珠
Transcriptions
Standard Mandarin
- Hanyu Pinyin: Pǔbù Dùnzhū

Purpu Tonchup (Tibetan: ཕུར་བུ་དོན་གྲུབ་, Wylie: Phur bu don grub; Chinese: 普布顿珠) is a Chinese politician of Tibetan ethnicity, currently serving as vice governor of Sichuan. Previously he was party secretary of Lhasa.

He is a representative of the 20th National Congress of the Chinese Communist Party and an alternate of the 20th Central Committee of the Chinese Communist Party. He is a delegate to the 13th National People's Congress.

== Early life and education ==
Phurbu Dongrub was born in Gyantse County, Tibet Autonomous Region, in November 1972. In 1991, he was accepted to Tibet University, where he majored in Tibetan language and literature. During school days, he was not only caught up in his studies but also became active in campus politics. He joined the Chinese Communist Party (CCP) in January 1996. He was vice president of the All-China Federation of Students and president of its branch, the Tibetan Autonomous Region Federation of Students.

== Political career ==
=== Tibet Autonomous Region ===
After University in 1996, Phurbu Dongrub was assigned to the Organization Department of the CCP Tibet Autonomous Regional Committee. In October 2002, he became deputy magistrate of Sangri County, rising to magistrate in April 2005. He also served as deputy party secretary of the county from September 2004 to April 2005. He was vice governor of Lhoka Prefecture in October 2010 and subsequently secretary-general of the CCP Lhoka Prefectural Committee in April 2012. In June 2012, he was appointed party secretary of Chengguan District, but having held the position for only a year. He was deputy party secretary of Nagqu Prefecture in August 2013, in addition to serving as head of the Organization Department of the CCP Nagqu Prefectural Committee. He was recalled to Lhoka Prefecture in June 2015, where he was appointed deputy party secretary and mayor of the prefecture. He was appointed vice chairman of Tibet Autonomous Region in June 2020, concurrently serving as party secretary of Chamdo. In November 2021, he was admitted to member of the Standing Committee of the CCP Tibet Autonomous Regional Committee, the region's top authority. In April 2022, he was chosen as party secretary of Lhasa.

=== Sichuan ===
In October 2023, he was appointed vice governor of Sichuan and was admitted to member of the CCP Sichuan Provincial Committee, the province's top authority.

Government offices
Preceded by Zhang Yongze	Governor of Shannan; 2015–2016	Position abolished
New title	Mayor of Shannan; 2016–2020	Succeeded by Ciren Pingcu
Party political offices
Preceded by Ahbu	Communist Party Secretary of Chamdo; 2020–2022	Succeeded by Gong Huicai
Preceded by Yan Jinhai	Communist Party Secretary of Lhasa; 2022–	Succeeded by Xiao Youcai
