= Suga'erbu =

Chinese politician

- 苏嘎尔布

Director of Sichuan Provincial Commission of Ethnic and Religious
- Incumbent
- Assumed office 29 September 2021
- Preceded by: Luo Zhenhua

Governor of Liangshan Yi Autonomous Prefecture
- In office 18 February 2017 – 29 September 2021
- Preceded by: Luo Liangqing
- Succeeded by: Ashilabi

Personal details
- Born: June 1964 (age 62) Yuexi County, Sichuan, China
- Party: Chinese Communist Party
- Education: Xichang University; Central Party School of the Chinese Communist Party

Chinese name
- Simplified Chinese: 苏嘎尔布
- Traditional Chinese: 蘇嘎爾佈
Transcriptions
Standard Mandarin
- Hanyu Pinyin: Sū Gā ěr Bù

Suga'erbu (Chinese: 苏嘎尔布; born June 1964) is a Chinese politician of Yi ethnicity currently serving as director of Sichuan Provincial Commission of Ethnic and Religious. Previously he served as governor of Liangshan Yi Autonomous Prefecture. He was a delegate to the 13th National People's Congress.

== Biography ==
Suga'erbu was born in Yuexi County, Sichuan, in June 1964. He graduated from Xichang University and the Central Party School of the Chinese Communist Party.

Suga'erbu joined the Chinese Communist Party (CCP) in June 1985. He began his political career in July 1985 from Butuo County, and eventually becoming magistrate in December 1997 and party secretary in March 2001. In November 2006, he was admitted to member of the Standing Committee of the CCP Liangshan Yi Autonomous Prefectural Committee, the prefecture's top authority. He was head of the United Front Work Department in December 2006 and deputy party secretary in November 2011. In November 2016, he was named acting governor of the prefecture, confirmed in February 2017. In September 2021, he was chosen as director of Sichuan Provincial Commission of Ethnic and Religious.

Government offices
Preceded by Luo Liangqing	Governor of Liangshan Yi Autonomous Prefecture; 2017–2021	Succeeded by Ashilabi
Preceded by Luo Zhenhua	Director of Sichuan Provincial Commission of Ethnic and Religious; 2021–	Incumbent
