= Yan Huizhu =

Mongolian performer of classical Chinese opera (1919–1966)

- Born: October 5, 1919; Beijing, Republic of China
- Died: September 10, 1966 (aged 46); Shanghai, China
- Occupation: Classical Chinese opera singer
- Spouses: Bai Yun (白雲) (divorced); Xue Haowei (薛浩伟) (m. 1955; div. 1960); Yu Zhenfei (俞振飛) (m. 1960–1966)

Yan Huizhu (Chinese 言慧珠, 1919–1966) was an ethnic Mongolian classical Chinese opera singer who performed in the jingju and kunqu genres. In 1946, she received high acclaim for her performance in Shengsi hen (Regret for Life and Death) in Beijing, becoming known as the "Queen of Beijing Opera". In 1957, she served as vice-president of the School of Traditional Operas in Shanghai and toured in Europe. Denounced under the Cultural Revolution, in the night of 10 September 1966 she committed suicide after the Red Guards had ransacked her home and accused her of being a counter revolutionary.

== Biography ==
Born on 5 October 1919, Yan Huizhu was born into a musical family of Mongolian ethnicity. After her parents were divorced while she was a small child, she was brought up by her father Yan Jupeng (1890–1942), a jingju actor who had developed his own style of "Yan" singing. Despite her father's efforts to discourage her from entering a difficult profession, she developed her artistic talents and learned songs and acting roles while he was away on tour.

While at Chunming Girls' School in Beijing, she played Nüqijie in the opera Yutangchun so well that Yan Jupeng allowed her to act. As a result, in 1937 she took singing and acting lessons using the stage name Huizhu and joining the Yongpingshe Troupe. When she was 24, she was trained by the jingju master Mei Lanfang who devoted time to her while he was unable to perform during the city's occupation by the Japanese. As she gained popularity, Yan Huizhu became known as "Little Mei Lanfang". In February 1946, she was particularly successful in performing Shengsi hen at the Queens' Theatre, after which she became known as the "Queen of Beijing Opera".

Following the establishment of Communist China in 1949, Yan Huizhu continued to perform. In 1957, she was appointed vice-president of the School of Traditional Operas in Shanghai and taught at the Mei school. Together with the celebrated Yu Zhenfei, she frequently performed in a revised version of Qiangtou mashang which led to their marriage in 1960. At the beginning of the Cultural Revolution, she was denounced by the Red Guards who ransacked their home. She committed suicide by hanging herself on the night of 10 September 1966, while Yu Zhenfei who was in the same room denied any knowledge of what had happened.
