= Suzhou Pingtan =

Musical and oral performance art native to China's Jiangnan region

Pingtan
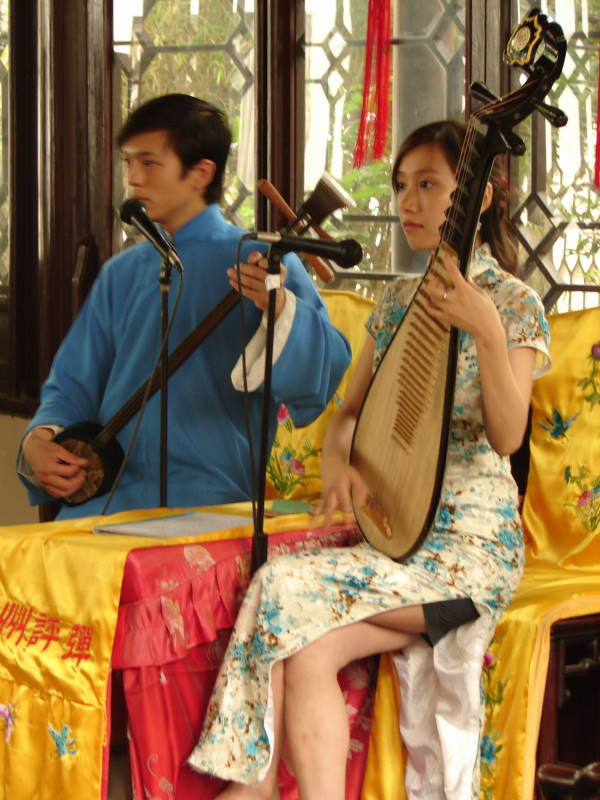
- Pingtan in Suzhou, 2008
- Etymology: Combination of pinghua and tanci
- Origin: Song dynasty
- Major region: Jiangnan
- Typical instruments: Pipa and sanxian
- Topolect: Mainly Suzhou dialect, occasionally non-standard Mandarin Chinese (e.g. Yunbai)

Pingtan
- Traditional Chinese: 評彈
- Simplified Chinese: 评弹
Transcriptions
Standard Mandarin
- Hanyu Pinyin: píngtán

Pingtan (Chinese: 评弹), also known as Suzhou pingtan, is a regional variety of quyi and a musical/oral performance art form popular in southern Jiangsu, northern Zhejiang, and Shanghai (the Jiangnan region of China). It originated in the city of Suzhou. It is a combination of the Chinese narrative musical traditions pinghua and tanci. It dates back to Song dynasty and is influenced by Wuyue culture.

Created by the work of the Pingtan artists, this art form enjoys great popularity in Jiangnan. The long history has also laid a solid foundation for its development. Its contents are rich, though the form is simple. "story telling, joke cracking, music playing and aria singing" are the performing techniques, while "reasoning, tastes, unexpectedness, interest and minuteness" are the artistic features. Although it originated in Suzhou, Pingtan flourished in Shanghai with the development of commerce and culture at the turn of the 19th century and the 20th century. After that, Pingtan became a new form of performance by innovating and carrying on the tradition.

== Origin and development ==
It originated in Suzhou about four hundred years ago. From the middle of the 19th century to the beginning of the 20th century, it was performed in Shanghai. At that time, Shanghai was one of the five treaty ports. Shanghai's economy was booming and various cultures arrived there. Pingtan absorbed some elements from various cultures and was well developed under the circumstances. The rise of records and radio stations also played an important role in popularizing Pingtan art. Another positive factor was the expansion of performing halls, which were decorated well and spacious. As a result, people like writers, painters, professors gradually became loyal fans. After the founding of People's Republic of China, 18 performers organized Shanghai People's Pingtan Troupe, which was the first official troupe. Based on traditional long story-telling, shorter and medium-sized stories were created, reflecting modern life. The form of performance is not limited in Shuchang, which was the traditional performing stage, however, in 1961 Pingtan concert was held which attracted nearly one thousand people to watch in each performance. While its traditional repertoire was banned during the Cultural Revolution, Pingtan still enjoyed a special status as a preferred medium for singing poems by Mao Zedong, making Pingtan known and appreciated throughout China, despite the dialectal barrier. Since the late 1970s, the traditional repertoire has been revived. The old artists undertook the task of passing the tradition on to the new generation. Pingtan is popularized by radio, television and Internet. Meanwhile, it faces challenges as a result of the popular entertainment industry.

== Distinction of Suzhou Pinghua and Suzhou Tanci ==
Suzhou Pinghua features oral storytelling, while Suzhou Tanci integrates storytelling and singing, both performed in Suzhou dialect. Locally, Suzhou Pinghua is called "Da Shu" (Big Story), and Suzhou Tanci is called "Xiao Shu" (Small Story), with both referred to as "Shuoshu" (storytelling).

=== Suzhou Pinghua ===
Suzhou Pinghua uses the third-person perspective of the storyteller for narration and inserting the first-person speech of characters through role imitation, known as "qi jue se" (assuming roles). The storyteller’s narrative is called "biao" (presentation), while the speech in roles is "bai" (dialogue). Both primarily employ prose, with some rhythmic segments like odes, chants, and verse dialogues for recitation. The performance emphasizes humor. Different stylistic schools emerged based on variations in language and character portrayal, such as:

Fangkou: Rigorous narration with fixed expressions.

Huokou: Flexible, improvisational narration tailored to the audience.

Kuaikou: Rapid, forceful delivery.

Mankou: Slower-paced narration.

Pingshuo: Focused on storytelling with minimal role assumption.

Suzhou Pinghua’s repertoire includes over 50 traditional works, such as historical sagas like Three Kingdoms, Sui-Tang Yanyi, and Western Han, collectively called "Armor Stories" for their martial themes. Shorter chivalric tales, or "Fist Stories," include Water Margin and Seven Heroes and Five Gallants. Mythological and judicial stories like Investiture of the Gods are also prominent. Performances are typically serialized, with each session lasting about 1.5 hours. A complete story might span months, with longer ones taking up to a year. Artists use techniques like foreshadowing and cliffhangers to engage audiences.

=== Suzhou Tanci ===
Suzhou Tanci combines storytelling and singing, with accompaniment on the sanxian or pipa. Storytelling may include rhythmic wooden clappers to captivate audiences. The music employs a structured system of storytelling tunes known as "shu diao" (story tunes), forming the foundation for various musical schools in Tanci. Early performances featured solo male artists ("single tandem"), later evolving into duo tandems and trio tandems. Suzhou Tanci emphasizes four skills: saying, humor, playing, and singing. The most emphasized skill “saying" involves narration, dialogue, explanation, and commentary, using diverse methods like:

"Biao" (Narration) delivered from the perspective of the storyteller as a third-person narrator to describing the setting, depicting the inner thoughts and emotions of the characters, introducing events, time, and space, as well as portraying the characters’ attire and appearance.

“Bai” (Dialogue) refers to the spoken interactions between characters, including direct dialogue, subtext, and inner monologues.

Suzhou Tanci pursues artistic ideals of reason, taste, humor, refinement, and skill, with "reason" emphasizing coherence, "taste" enduring thoughtfulness, "humor" eliciting laughter, "refinement" showcasing elegance, and "skill" demonstrating artistry.

Traditional works, mostly long-form, include The Three Smiles, The Legend of the White Snake, and Miao Jin Feng. In the early 20th century, female performers rose to prominence. From the 1930s, Suzhou Tanci thrived with radio broadcasts and diverse schools.

== Performance ==
=== Props ===
The actors sing, accompanied by musical instruments such as a small sanxian or pipa. Pingtan artists also use fans, gavels and handkerchieves as performance props. Players can display different roles' characteristics and identities by using fans. Fans can also be used as symbolic props to represent knives, guns, swords or whips. Gavels are usually made of jade, Dysoxylum spp or crystal and about 3 cm in length and 1 cm in width. When struck, they make a clear sound. They are used to make all kinds of sounds and atmosphere. Actors usually use white handkerchieves, while actresses choose different colors and materials according to the plot.

=== Forms ===
Pingtan contains talking, joking, instrument-playing, singing and acting. Suzhou Pingtan which involves singing and storytelling, is performed solo, in duet or as a trio. The small three-stringed plucked instrument and Pipa (lute) are used as accompaniment. The Ban, or wooden clappers, produce various styles of tone and melody. Pingtan has absorbed popular folk tunes. The special art Pintan performance is concentrated on the five words, joking, instrument-playing, singing and acting. Talking uses authentic and skilled Suzhou dialect to narrate stories and deduce characters. Narration and speaking are two forms of talking. Joking is the funny part of Pingtan, which arises audience's attention and interests. Instrument-playing is used to assist singing in order to make it more musical and filled with strong sense of rhythm.

=== Styles ===
There are many different performance styles concerning Pingtan. It is divided into the Chen Yuquan, Ma Rufei and Yu Xiushan Schools called Chen Diao, Ma Diao, Yu Diao. Over about a century, new styles were formed which inherited the legacy of the three schools. Liu Tianyun and Yang Zhenxiong inherited the Chen School, and Xia Hesheng and Zhu Huizhen inherited the Yu School. The Ma School exerted the greatest impact on posterity, with successors who formed schools of their own, such as Xue Xiaoqing Diao(tone), Shen Jianan Diao and Qin Diao(developed by Zhu Xueqin on the basis of Xue Diao). Zhou Yuquan developed into a school on the basis of Ma Diao, while Jiang Yuequan developed into a school on the basis of Zhou Diao. Due to this development, Suzhou Pingtan has a great diversity of styles in singing and storytelling.

=== Features ===
Simply, Pingtan is a kind of talking and singing art which uses Wu dialect to tell stories.

- Pingtan is intended to tell stories, especially long stories. Pingtan performers always separate a long story into several parts. In this way, they could form their own style to form and describe plots. For instance, surrounding one or two complex plots to tell stories, making some involvements, and repeating some important plots are common ways.
- Pingtan is a verbal literary artform which has a lot of oral features. As a kind of language art, it will use words to create imaginative images. The performers have to use vivid words which can make the audience imagine the scenes.
- Pingtan combines storytelling and singing, so it can express feelings more strongly and it has local styles. It will cover some culture phenomenon of daily life in local area.

== Artistic characteristics ==
Pingtan forms its own artistic characteristics of reasoning, taste, unexpectedness, interest and minuteness. Reasoning is not the boring preachment given by the performers. On the contrary, it tends to disclose objective laws and essence of real life by means of shaping vivid characters. And the development of the personalities of characters correspond to their circumstances. People usually judge the authenticity of what they heard according to their own experiences. If audience find the contents go against objective laws or have no references, it will be hard to arouse people's interests and bring their imagination. In addition, there is no doubt that Pingtan may lose the impact of arts. Taste means the feelings of artistic beauty. It results from the expression of artistic characteristics. At the same time, taste is a kind of emotional infection. Thus storytellers ought to skillfully master a variety of skills to ensure the storytelling filled with taste. Fully studying the chance of the development of things can receive unexpectedness. On account of the strong narrative description of characters and plots, Pingtan needs the effect of the twists of the plot structure. Interest reveals the performers attach much importance to the recreational effect of Pingtan. Performers' ultimate goal is to cater to the interests of the public. When it comes to minuteness, it also arises from the real life. The lively and true descriptions of details depend on the performers' observation and experiences.

== Famous artists ==
- Jiang Yuequan (蒋月泉)
- Chen Yuqian (陈遇乾)
- Yao Yinmei (姚荫梅)
- Yang Zhengxiong (杨振雄)
- Zhou Yuquan (周玉泉)
- Shen Jian'an (沈硷安)
- Xue Xiaoqin (薛筱卿)
- Yang Xiaoting (杨筱亭)
- Ma Rufei (马如飞)

== Notable works ==
=== Long story-telling ===
- Butterfly lovers (梁祝)
- Diao Chan (貂蝉)
- Fate in Tears and Laughter, Tixiao Yinyuan
- Jiang Jie (江姐)
- Romance of the Western Chamber (西厢记)

=== Medium-length stories ===
- The Injustice to Dou E (窦娥冤)
- Liu Hulan (刘胡兰)
- The White Haired Girl (白毛女)
- Rinchuu (林冲)

=== Shorter stories ===
- Liu Hulan Dies A Martyr (刘胡兰就义)
- Iron Man Wang (王铁人)
- Sunday (礼拜天)

== Comparison with other kinds of quyi ==
There are also many other kinds of Quyi. Different areas have different history of 'storytelling'—this kind of art. However, they are all combined with local features and mostly performed in dialects. Compared with other talking and singing artforms, Pingtan is a kind art which performers will sit and perform. Pinghua just talk and Tanci will talk and sing just like Pingshu in northern areas. Quyi can be divided into several parts according to the contents: story-telling, just joking for fun, singing songs to express feelings. And Pingtan belongs to the first one.
