= Zhang Jun (Kunqu) =

Chinese Kunqu opera performer (born 1974)

- Born: 張軍; October 1974 (age 51); Shanghai, China
- Occupations: Opera singer, actor

Zhang Jun (simplified Chinese: 张军; traditional Chinese: 張軍; pinyin: Zhāng Jūn; born October 1974) is a Chinese Kunqu opera performer. In May 2011, Zhang was awarded the UNESCO Artist for Peace award for his "long-term commitment to promoting intangible cultural heritage, especially Kunqu Opera." He became the only second Chinese after actress Gong Li to be awarded the title since 2001.

The first Kunqu opera singer in China to focus on revitalizing and promoting the ancient art form to a younger generation which he first started in universities and schools in 1998, Zhang's dream is to bring "Kunqu to an international stage" for people everywhere in the world to appreciate this ancient Chinese art.

Currently in London and New York on a one-man contemporary performance of I, Hamlet, which is an adaptation of Shakespeare's Hamlet, he plays four key roles telling the classic tale through a Kunqu monologue.

== Personal life ==
Born to farmers, Zhang grew up in Shanghai's Qingpu District. At 12, he was the only boy selected from 2,000 candidates by the Shanghai Traditional Opera School to learn the traditional opera Kunqu which he trained intensively for eight years.
