= Zhang Jiqing =

Chinese Kunqu artist (1938–2022)

- Born: Zhang Yiqing; January 1938; Wuzhen, China
- Died: 6 January 2022 (aged 83)
- Known for: Chinese opera
- Spouse: Yao Jikun
- Awards: the 1st Plum Blossom Prize

Zhang Jiqing (Chinese: 张继青; pinyin: Zhāng Jìqīng; January 1938 – 6 January 2022) was a Kunqu artist.

== Life and career ==
=== Early life ===
Zhang became an artist not because of her ambition but for living. After the outbreak of the Second Sino-Japanese War, her grandmother, together with her mother and aunt left for Wuqing (乌青镇) to seek refuge when her mother happened to give birth to Zhang in 1938 at Wuqing, the hometown of many intellectuals, such as Sun Muxin (孙木心). Qing became a part of her alias "Yi qing" (忆青) named after the town of Wuqing.

Zhang's grandfather was a "Sue Beach" (苏滩, Suzhou Tanhuang (Kun opera's sister art form)) artist. Her family used to form a "Zhang Jia Ban" (张家班, a group of people whose family names are all Zhang or the group founder's family name is Zhang), making a living by performing on the wharf. Zhang was imbued with what she had seen and heard when she was young, whereas her serious learning of opera only began at the age of 14.

Zhang Yiqing was first arranged the role of four operas in the New opera "Mandarin Duck Sword" (鸳鸯剑). One of Shanghai "Chuan Generation" (传字辈)—Zheng Chuanjian (郑传鉴) was invited to rehearse The Cowherd and The Weaving Maid (牛郎织女) and this was the first time that Zhang received influence from Kunqu predecessors.

=== Career in opera ===
In 1952, Zhang went to take care of her aunt who was in Shanghai's Minfeng Troupe of Suzhou opera. Unexpectedly, seeking refuge with her aunt because of poverty, Zhang inadvertently began her life as an artist. Zhang Jiqing joined the Minfeng Troupe of Suzhou opera when she was 14 years old. She studied Suzhou opera and played Dan (Chinese opera) role in her early career life. Later, the Minfeng Troupe of Suzhou opera was settled in Suzhou in October 1953. In March 1954, You Caiyun, a famous expert of Kunqu in the last years of the Qing dynasty, was invited to the Minfeng Troupe of Suzhou opera to teach the "Ji Generation" (继字辈) about Kunqu. At the beginning of 1955, Zhang Jiqing played the leading role of two Korean operas, Legend of Chun Xiang (Chunhyangjeon) and Legend of Shen Qing. In addition, she played a role in a modern drama named Liu Hulan with her mother Zhang Huifen (she was also a Chinese opera actress) from the Qingfeng Troupe of Suzhou opera after the two troupes were consolidated.

After 1958, she concentrated most of her time on Kunqu and received instruction from some experts such as Shen Chuanzhi, Yao Chuanxiang, and Yu Xihou. She became known by audiences for playing Zhengdan (also known as Tsing Yi, the main female role in Chinese opera), Wudan (the supporting female role in Chinese opera, usually a well-educated lady over the age of 15), and Liudan (the supporting female role in Chinese opera, whose social status is lower than that of Wudan). Her representative dramas are The Peony Pavilion, The Divorce of Chu Mai-sen (also Pingyin as: Zhu Maichen) (Chinese: 朱买臣), etc. She was awarded the 1st Plum Blossom Prize in 1983. Yu Xihou, a student of Yu Sulu, quite an expert in the singing and spoken parts of Dan, has influenced Zhang the most in her Kunqu career.

=== Personal life and death ===
Zhang Jiqing, like her husband Yao Jikun, was a member of the "Ji Generation" (继字辈). They married ten years after meeting, on 1 May 1991.

She died on 6 January 2022, at the age of 83.

== Overseas performances ==
=== Italy ===
Her initial visit to Italy had great effects. In 1980, the ancient city— Suzhou and the Italian city- Venice became sister cities. Mayor Rodrigo invited the Suzhou city government to form art performing groups and give performances in Venice in October 1982. He showed much hope that Zhang would participate in this troupe. With the arrangement of Jiangsu Province and the Suzhou government, the "Suzhou Opera Troupe" was formed, performing Peking Opera, Kunqu and Suzhou storytelling. Zhang Jiqing accepted the invitation and performed The Peony Pavilion and the Lankeshan—the Crazy Dream. The first show was very successful. After Venice, the troupe went to Florence, and finally returned to Rome, Italy.

=== West Berlin and Italy ===
This visit was the first time for Kunqu, this ancient form of theater, to go abroad as an independent group after the founding of People's Republic of China. It could be said that the ancient history of Kunqu performances opened a new chapter since then. The first repertoire was The Peony Pavilion. Zhang responded to a curtain call 15 times, and cheers resounded through the theater. The last performance was The Divorce of Chu Mai-sen.

=== Japan ===
When Zhang was still in China, Japan's NHK made a special trip to China and shot a documentary for Zhang- The Dream of Jiangnan. The representative performances—The Peony Pavilion and The Divorce of Chu Mai-sen were shown, and then received tremendous response.

=== Festival d'automne à Paris ===
After a commercial performance in Japan, Zhang Jiqing went to France to participate in Festival d'automne à Paris. Her performance named The Peony Pavilion was greatly welcomed by the local audiences. She also received the title of the "Honorary Citizen" of Villeurbanne. In December 1993, Zhang Jiqing, together with her husband Yao Jikun, went to Korea to participate in the Seoul Art Festival and performed the Divorce of Chu Mai-sen. In the second half of 1997, they went to visit the Helsinki Festival in Northern Europe, and also performed The Divorce of Chu Mai-sen. These performances achieved great success. In 1998, Zhang Jiqing cooperated with a famous Japanese Kyōgen actor, Mansaku Nomura to perform a traditional Chinese play named the Jade Hairpin (玉簪记) in Tokyo.

== Acceptance of apprentice ==
Invited by Pai Hsien-yung, Zhang Jiqing became the art director of the Peony Pavilion of the youth version in 2003. (The youth version means kunqu played by young actors and modified to appeal to the young people.) Shen Fengying, acting the role of Du Liniang, formally became Zhang's first apprentice.

== Main works ==
Zhang Jiqing has played the leading role of many plays, including:

- Ms. Cui in The Divorce of Zhu Maichen
- Du Liniang in The Peony Pavilion
- Yang Yuhuan in The Palace of Eternal Youth
- the White Snake in Legend of the White Snake
- Dou E in Dou E Grievances (窦娥冤)
- Madam Ying in Journey to the West-Child Recognition which was written by Wu Cheng'en (吴承恩)
- "Three Dreams": "The Crazy Dream", "The Surprised Dream", "Look For the Dream".

== Honours and achievements ==
- Advanced Worker in National Culture and Education Gathering of Workers in 1960
- 1st Yamamoto Yasue Commemorative Fund in March 1993
- Kunqu Art Remarkable Achievement Award in October 2002 by the Ministry of Culture
- Representative at the 5th, 6th, 7th, 8th Representatives of the National People's Congress
- Honorary President of Suzhou Kunqu Opera Theater of Jiangsu Province
- Vice-chairman of Federation of Literary and Art Circles of Jiangsu Province (Before)
