= Huang Fangfang =

Chinese politician

- 黄方方

Director of the Development and Reform Commission of Guangxi Zhuang Autonomous Region
- In office August 2011 – February 2018
- Preceded by: Zhang Yuanxin
- Succeeded by: Liu Hongwu

Personal details
- Born: October 1958 (age 67–68) Tiandeng County, Guangxi, China
- Party: Chinese Communist Party
- Education: Chengdu University of Technology; China University of Geosciences; China University of Political Science and Law

Chinese name
- Simplified Chinese: 黄方方
- Traditional Chinese: 黃方方
Transcriptions
Standard Mandarin
- Hanyu Pinyin: Huáng Fāngfāng

Huang Fangfang (Chinese: 黄方方; born October 1958) is a former Chinese politician who served as director of the Development and Reform Commission of Guangxi Zhuang Autonomous Region between 2011 and 2018. He was investigated by China's top anti-graft agency in November 2022.

He was a delegate to the 9th, 10th and 11th National People's Congress.

== Early life and education ==
Huang was born in Tiandeng County, Guangxi, in October 1958. After resuming the college entrance examination, in 1978, he entered Chengdu College of Geology (now Chengdu University of Technology), where he earned his Master of Science degree in 1989. He went on to receive his Doctor of Science degree in 1992 from China University of Geosciences. He was a student at China University of Political Science and Law from July 1995 to February 1997. He also studied as a part-time student at the Advanced Training Course jointly organized by Tsinghua University and Harvard University in 2005.

== Political career ==
Huang joined the Chinese Communist Party (CCP) in December 1981, and began his political career in July 1992, when he became an official in the Geological Research Institute of Guangxi Zhuang Autonomous Region. In April 1994, he was assigned to the Bureau of Geology and Mineral Resources of Guangxi Zhuang Autonomous Region, and eventually becoming deputy director in November 1997. In May 1998, he was appointed director of the Coal Industry Bureau of Guangxi Zhuang Autonomous Region, but having held the position for only six months.

Huang was deputy party secretary of Wuzhou in December 1998, in addition to serving as mayor. He was assigned to the similar position in Guigang in February 2002.

In April 2003, Huang was appointed director of the Department of Land and Resources of Guangxi Zhuang Autonomous Region, concurrently serving as party branch secretary.

In May 2008, Huang was transferred to Nanning, the capital of Guangxi Zhuang Autonomous Region, and appointed deputy party secretary. In June, he was named acting mayor, confirmed in August.

He was director of the Development and Reform Commission of Guangxi Zhuang Autonomous Region in August 2011 and subsequently party branch secretary in February 2018.

== Investigation ==
On 27 October 2022, Huang has been placed under investigation for "serious violations of laws and regulations" by the Central Commission for Discipline Inspection (CCDI), the party's internal disciplinary body, and the National Supervisory Commission, the highest anti-corruption agency of China.

Government offices
Preceded by Ni Longsheng	Mayor of Wuzhou; 1998–2002	Succeeded by Zhong Xiangting
Preceded by Liang Shengli	Mayor of Guigang; 2002–2003	Succeeded by Xie Jianchen (谢建辰)
Preceded by Chen Xiangqun	Mayor of Nanning; 2008–2011	Succeeded by Zhou Hongbo
Preceded by Zhang Yuanxin	Director of the Development and Reform Commission of Guangxi Zhuang Autonomous Region; 2011–2018	Succeeded by Liu Hongwu
