= Bai Tao =

Chinese businessman

- 白涛
- Born: 1963 (age 62–63); China
- Education: Renmin University of China
- Occupations: Business executive, economist
- Years active: 1984–present
- Political party: Chinese Communist Party

Chinese name
- Traditional Chinese: 白濤
- Simplified Chinese: 白涛
Transcriptions
Standard Mandarin
- Hanyu Pinyin: Bái Tāo

Bai Tao (Chinese: 白涛; born 1963) is a Chinese business executive and senior economist who is the current chairman and party secretary of China Life Insurance Company, in office since 14 January 2022.

== Biography ==
Born in 1963, Bai graduated from the Renmin University of China. Beginning in 1984, he served in several posts in the Industrial and Commercial Bank of China, including vice president of Jilin Branch, president of Hunan Branch, and general manager of Risk Management Department. In June 2014, he was appointed vice chairman of China Life Insurance Company, but having held the position for only two years. In October 2016, he became deputy general manager of China Investment Corporation, concurrently serving as general manager of Central Huijin Investment (中央汇金投资有限公司). In June 2018, he was recalled to China Life Insurance Company, where he was vice chairman and deputy party secretary. In January 2020, he rose to become chairman and party branch secretary of the State Development & Investment Corporation, and served until 14 January 2022, when he was appointed chairman and party secretary of China Life Insurance Company. His predecessor Wang Bin was sacked for corruption on January 8.

Business positions
Preceded by Wang Bin	Chairman of China Life Insurance Company; 2022–present	Incumbent
Party political offices
Preceded by Wang Bin	Communist Party Secretary of China Life Insurance Company; 2022–present	Incumbent
