= Hua Wenyi =

Chinese Kunqu opera performer (1941–2022)

- 华文漪
- Born: 21 February 1941; Shanghai, China
- Died: 13 April 2022 (aged 81); Los Angeles, California, U.S.
- Education: Shanghai Opera School
- Occupation: Opera actress
- Spouse: Su Shengyi

Hua Wenyi (Chinese: 华文漪; 21 February 1941 – 13 April 2022) was a Chinese Kunqu opera performer.

== Biography ==
Wenyi Hua was born in Shanghai on 21 February 1941 and graduated from the Shanghai Opera School in 1961. For the next ten years, she was a member of the Shanghai Youth Beijing and Kunqu Troupe. She joined the Shanghai Kun Opera Company in 1978 and became its director in 1985. In 1986, she staged The Peony Pavilion at the Edinburgh Festival in Scotland.

In 1989, she went to the United States to perform with the Shanghai Kunqu Opera Troupe. Due to a conflict with the Shanghai Kunqu Opera Troupe, she decided to remain in the United States, settling in Arcadia, a city in the San Gabriel Valley located about 13 miles northeast of downtown Los Angeles. With Su Shengyi, a dancer and painted-face actor, she founded the Hua Kun Opera Association (which was based out of her home in Arcadia), which received some support from U.S. government funding agencies and gave regular performances every year. She also served as a visiting professor at Yale University, Princeton University, and other universities, introducing Kunqu opera to Westerners.

In 2007, under the coordination of the Shanghai Municipal Committee of the Chinese Communist Party, Hua finally returned to the Shanghai Kunqu Opera Troupe. She starred in the performance commemorating her teacher Yan Huizhu, and also served as the teacher of the boudoir class of her alma mater, the Shanghai Opera School.

Hua died on 13 April 2022, at the age of 81.

== Awards ==
- In 1987 she received the Plum Blossom Award for her performance in the play Yu Zan Ji (The Jade Hairpin).
- In 1997 she won a National Heritage Fellowship, the U.S.'s highest honor in the traditional and folk arts.
