= Yunbai =

Yunbai (simplified Chinese: 韵白; traditional Chinese: 韻白; pinyin: yùnbái), also known as Zhongzhou rhyme (中州韵; 中州韻; Zhōngzhōu-yùn or 中州音; Zhōngzhōu-yīn) and Huguang pronunciation (湖广音; 湖廣音; Húguǎng-yīn), is a form of stage dialect used in Beijing opera and Kunqu. It utilizes a local dialect typical of central China, with a sing-song and rhythmic quality.

== Impact on other traditions ==
During the reign of Yongzheng of the Qing Dynasty, the nascent form of Cantonese opera was initially performed using this stage dialect, rather than the native Cantonese of the audience. The stage dialect was generally known as Mandarin (simplified Chinese: 官话; traditional Chinese: 官話; pinyin: guānhuà; Jyutping: gun1 waa6-2) or "Stage Mandarin" (simplified Chinese: 戏棚官话; traditional Chinese: 戲棚官話; pinyin: xìpéng guānhuà; Jyutping: hei3 paang4 gun1 waa6-2) by locals outside the industry. The use of this stage dialect in Cantonese opera continued into the early Republican period, as a shift to Cantonese in Cantonese opera occurred.

== See also ==
- Beijing opera
