= Sichuan Normal University =

Teacher's college in Chengdu, Sichuan, China

- 四川师范大学
- Motto: 重德，博学，务实，尚美
- Type: Public
- Established: 1938; 88 years ago
- Affiliations: Sichuan
- President: Wang Mingyi 汪明义
- Location: Chengdu, Sichuan, China
- Campus: 3300 mu; main campus: 1000 mu; Chenglong campus: 1935 mu（after completion）
- Website: www.sicnu.edu.cn

Sichuan Normal University (SICNU; Chinese: 四川师范大学) is a provincial public normal university in Chengdu, Sichuan, China. It is affiliated with the Sichuan Provincial People's Government.

== History ==
The origin of SICNU can be traced back to the National Northeastern University, which was exiled out of Northeast China after the Mukden Incident in 1931 and relocated to Santai in 1938 after the Marco Polo Bridge Incident and the subsequent Japanese invasion of North China. After the Second Sino-Japanese War (1937–1945) was over, the Northeastern University moved back to its home in Shenyang, but some of its faculties and staff remained in Sichuan, and in 1946, they established Northern Sichuan Workers and Peasants College on the same Santai campus. Later, it was renamed as Northern Sichuan University and moved to Nanchong City. In 1952, during the period of the merger of universities and colleges across the country, Sichuan Teachers College (STC) came into being. It mainly grew out of Northern Sichuan University, and at the same time, it merged with Eastern Sichuan College of Education and some specialties from Sichuan University and West China University. In 1956, STC moved to Chengdu, and in 1985, approved by the State Commission of Education, STC was renamed as Sichuan Normal University.

== Campus ==
SICNU is located southeast of downtown Chengdu, and is outside Chengdu's 2nd Ring Road. It now has four campuses, the main campus, the Eastern Campus, Chenglong Campus and Shizishan Campus. The campus which is located in Jinjiang (Chinese: 锦江) District is the main campus, and it covers an area of 3,000 mu. Its library is the third largest in Sichuan Province, and it has a collection of bound volumes of 300,000 titles.

== Colleges and Schools ==
SICNU consists of 18 colleges: Chinese Language and Literature, Mathematics and Software, Continuing Education and others. Approved by the Ministry of Education, SICNU set up two separate colleges. These campuses have 21 research institutes and sectors, 69 undergraduate specialties and 42 specialties entitled to grant master's degrees. SICNU is also authorized to enroll students for master's degree in education and students for certificates in various specialties at graduate level. In addition, SICNU has 29 key disciplines and laboratories as well as personnel training centres.

== Achievements ==
In the past five years, SICNU faculty staff have undertaken over 400 research projects that come from the National Social Sciences Foundation, the National Natural Sciences Foundation, the Xinhuo Program at national level, the National 863 Key Program of High Technology, the Tenth-Five Years Planning of the National Education Science as well as other scientific and technological programs at ministerial or provincial level. In addition, SICNU faculty staff have published over 500 academic books and 5,000 academic theses and papers. 380 of these were printed by SCI, EI, or ISTP journals. SICNU faculty staff also have obtained 130 prizes in the name of Scientific and Technologic Awards at national or provincial level, Invention Awards, Philosophy and Social Sciences Achievement Awards and High Quality Teaching Achievement Awards.
