= Liu Jun (politician, born 1957) =

Chinese politician (born 1957)

- 刘君

Vice Chairman of the Guangxi Regional Committee of the Chinese People's Political Consultative Conference
- In office January 2013 – January 2018
- Chairman: Peng Qinghua; Lu Xinshe

Personal details
- Born: March 1957 (age 69) Hengnan County, Hunan, China
- Party: Chinese Communist Party (1976–2018; expelled)
- Education: Central South University of Forestry and Technology; Zhongnan University of Economics and Law

Chinese name
- Simplified Chinese: 刘君
- Traditional Chinese: 劉君
Transcriptions
Standard Mandarin
- Hanyu Pinyin: Liú Jūn

Liu Jun (Chinese: 刘君; born March 1957) is a former Chinese politician who spent most of his career in southwest China's Guangxi Zhuang Autonomous Region. He was investigated by China's top anti-graft agency in February 2018. Previously he served as vice chairman of the Guangxi Regional Committee of the Chinese People's Political Consultative Conference and before that, chairman of the Standing Committee of Guilin Municipal People's Congress and party secretary of Guilin.

He was a representative of the 18th National Congress of the Chinese Communist Party and was a delegate to the 10th National People's Congress.

== Early life and education ==
Liu was born in Hengnan County, Hunan, in March 1957. During the late Cultural Revolution, he was a sent-down youth in his home-county. He joined the Chinese Communist Party (CCP) in May 1976. After resuming the college entrance examination in 1978, he was accepted to Central South Forestry College (now Central South University of Forestry and Technology), majoring in wood machining.

== Career ==
In January 1982, he worked in the Ministry of Forestry after university.

In November 1998, he was assigned to southwest China's Guangxi Zhuang Autonomous Region and appointed vice mayor of Wuzhou. In September 1999, he was appointed head of Organization Department and was admitted to member of the standing committee of the CCP Yulin Municipal Committee, the city's top authority. In July 2000, he was promoted to acting mayor of Beihai, confirmed in September of that same year. He was director of the Administration for Industry and Commerce of Guangxi Zhuang Autonomous Region in June 2004, and held that office until August 2008, when he was despatched to the capital Guilin and appointed party secretary. It would be his first job as "first-in-charge" of a city. He became vice chairman of the Guangxi Regional Committee of the Chinese People's Political Consultative Conference in January 2013, and served until January 2018.

== Downfall ==
On 12 February 2018, he has come under investigation for "serious legal violations" by the ruling Communist Party's corruption watchdog body, the Central Commission for Discipline Inspection (CCDI). He was expelled from the Chinese Communist Party and was demoted to non leadership position at deputy division level (副处级非领导职务).

Government offices
Preceded by Jin Renshou (金仁寿)	Mayor of Beihai; 2000–2004	Succeeded by Tang Chengliang
Party political offices
Preceded by Gao Xiong (高雄)	Communist Party Secretary of Guilin; 2008–2013	Succeeded by Zhao Leqin
Assembly seats
Preceded by Gao Xiong (高雄)	Chairman of the Standing Committee of Guilin Municipal People's Congress; 2009–2013	Succeeded by Zhao Leqin
