= Wang Hanqing =

- 王汉青

Communist Party Secretary of Central South University of Forestry and Technology
- In office September 2019 – 2024
- President: Liao Xiaoping
- Preceded by: Zhao Yunlin
- Succeeded by: Wu Yiqiang

Communist Party Secretary of the University of South China
- In office April 2016 – September 2019
- President: Wen Gebo; Zhang Zhuohua
- Preceded by: Zou Shuliang
- Succeeded by: Gao Shan

President of Hunan University of Technology
- In office May 2006 – April 2016
- Party Secretary: Himself
- Preceded by: Zhang Xiaoqi
- Succeeded by: Tan Yimin

Communist Party Secretary of Hunan University of Technology
- In office February 2006 – April 2016
- President: Himself
- Preceded by: New title
- Succeeded by: Tang Mobing

Communist Party Secretary of Zhuzhou Institute of Technology
- In office January 2003 – February 2006
- President: Himself
- Preceded by: Zhang Xiaoqi
- Succeeded by: Position revoked

Personal details
- Born: October 1963 (age 62–63) Yiyang, Hunan, China
- Party: Chinese Communist Party (expelled)
- Education

Chinese name
- Simplified Chinese: 王汉青
- Traditional Chinese: 王漢青
Transcriptions
Standard Mandarin
- Hanyu Pinyin: Wáng Hànqīng

Wang Hanqing (Chinese: 王汉青; born October 1963) is a retired Chinese educator and university administrator who successively served as president and party secretary of Hunan University of Technology, party secretary of the University of South China, and party secretary of the Central South University of Forestry and Technology. As of February 2025 he was under investigation by China's top anti-graft watchdog.

== Early life and education ==
Wang was born in Yiyang, Hunan, in October 1963.

== Career ==
Wang entered the workforce in 1986. In April 1989, he became vice president of Central South Institute of Technology (now Central South University), he remained in that position until May 2000, when he was transferred to Hengyang and appointed vice president of University of South China. In January 2003, he was chosen as party secretary of Zhuzhou Institute of Technology (renamed Hunan University of Technology in February 2006), concurrently holding the president position since May 2006. In April 2016, he was transferred back to the University of South China and appointed party secretary, a post he kept until September 2019, when he was made party secretary of the Central South University of Forestry and Technology. He retired in 2024.

== Downfall ==
On 21 February 2025, Wang was put under investigation for alleged "serious violations of discipline and laws" by the Central Commission for Discipline Inspection (CCDI), the party's internal disciplinary body, and the National Supervisory Commission, the highest anti-corruption agency of China. His deputy Liao Xiaoping, president of the Central South University of Forestry and Technology, was sacked for graft six days ago. On August 4, he was stripped of his posts within the CCP and in the public office. On September 11, he was arrested by the Supreme People's Procuratorate for suspected bribe taking and corruption.

Party political offices
Preceded by Zhang Xiaoqi (张晓琪)	Communist Party Secretary of Zhuzhou Institute of Technology; 2003–2006	Succeeded by Position revoked
New title	Communist Party Secretary of Hunan University of Technology; 2006–2016	Succeeded by Tang Mobing (唐末兵)
Preceded by Zou Shuliang (邹树梁)	Communist Party Secretary of the University of South China; 2016–2019	Succeeded by Gao Shan (高山)
Preceded by Zhao Yunlin (赵运林)	Communist Party Secretary of Central South University of Forestry and Technology; 2019–2024	Succeeded by Wu Yiqiang (吴义强)
Educational offices
Preceded by Zhang Xiaoqi (张晓琪)	President of Hunan University of Technology; 2006–2016	Succeeded by Tan Yimin (谭益民)
