= Wuxi opera =

Style of Chinese opera

- Native name: Xiju
- Other names: Xi opera
- Origin: 1900s
- Major region: Southern Jiangsu (area around Wuxi and Changzhou), Shanghai
- Typical instruments: Erhu; Pipa; Sanxian; Yangqin; Xiao; Dizi
- Topolect: Wu Chinese (Wuxi dialect)

Chinese name
- Traditional Chinese: 錫劇
- Simplified Chinese: 锡剧
Transcriptions
Standard Mandarin
- Hanyu Pinyin: Xījù

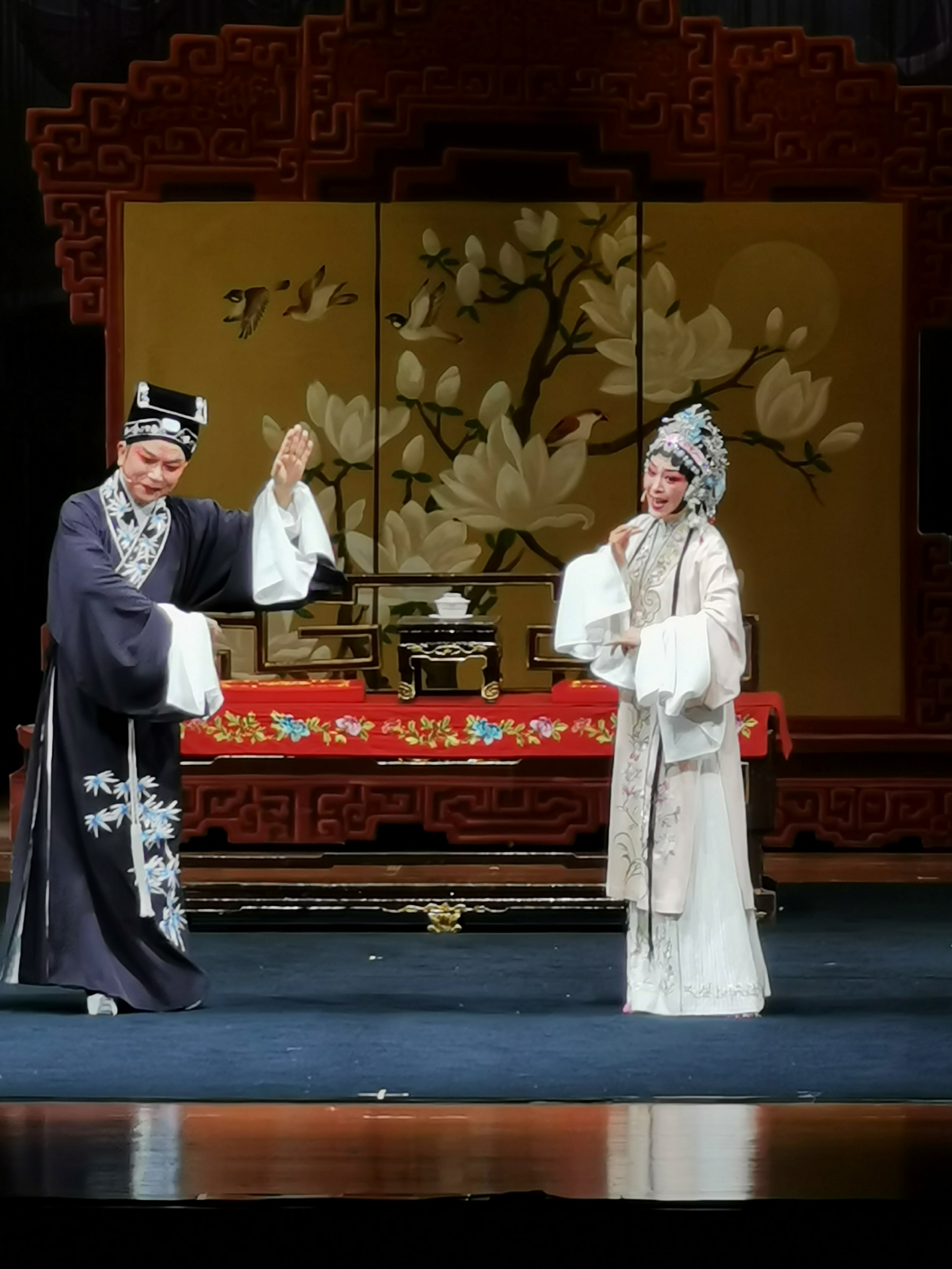
XIJU

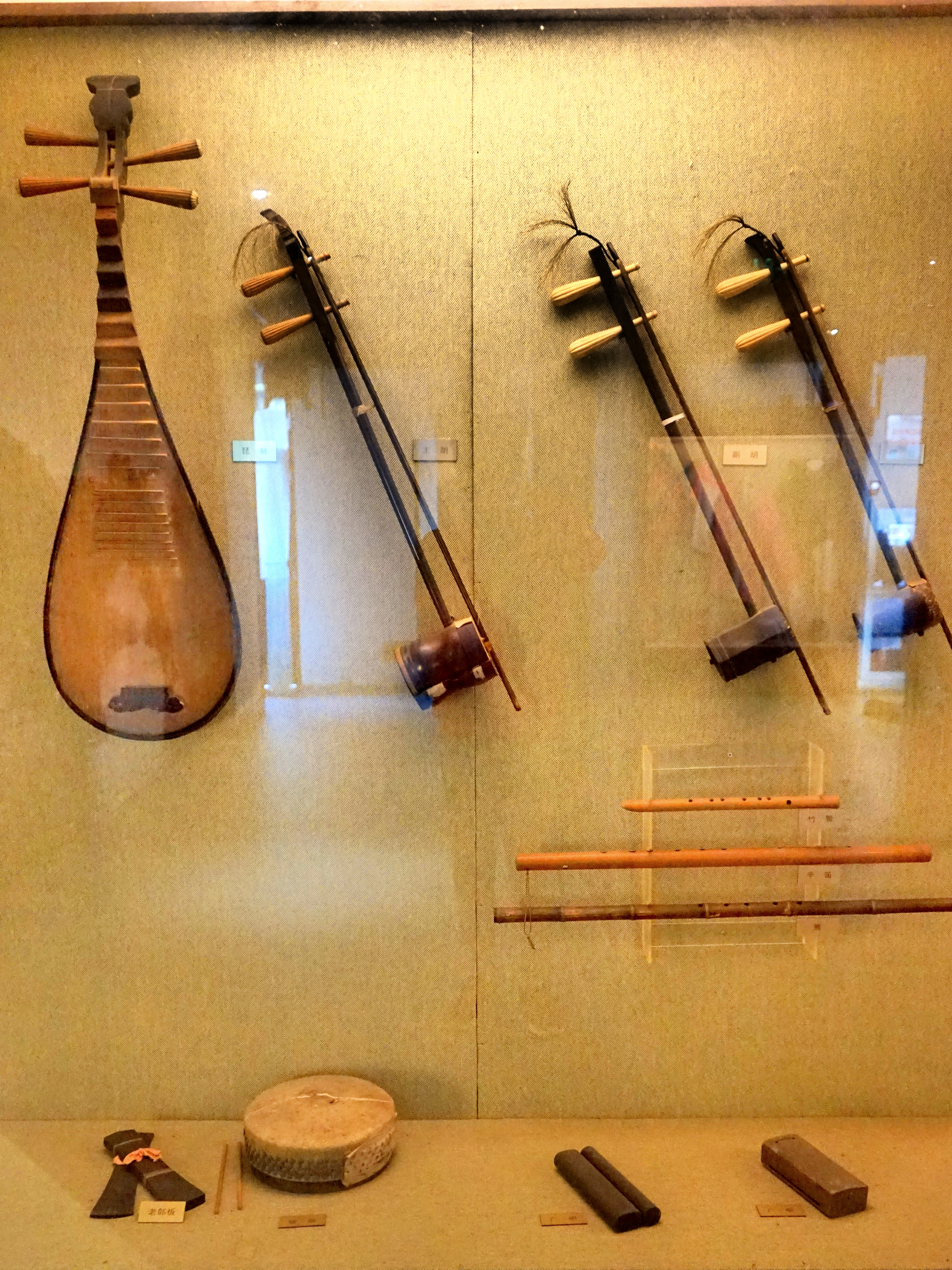
Common instruments in Wuxi opera, including the pipa (lute), erhu, various flutes, and percussion instruments (drum and clappers).

Xiju (Chinese: 锡剧; pinyin: Xījù), also known as Wuxi opera, is a genre of opera which originated in the southern region of the Yangtze River Delta in China. It evolved from "Tanhuang" (滩簧), a folk opera art in the region of Wuxi and Changzhou of Jiangsu province. As one of the main local operas in Jiangsu Province, Wuxi opera has been reputed as "a piece of plum flower in Taihu Lake", a title given to the three major operas in East China, alongside Yue opera and Huangmei opera.

In May 1949, Wang Hanqing, Zou Peng, Wang Yuanyuan and others established the Red Star Tin Troupe in Shanghai. This was the beginning of the folks' renaming of "ChangXi opera" as the "Wuxi opera" (Xiju). In 1950, the Southern Jiangsu Administrative Office renamed the "Changxi Drama" as "ChangXi opera", referred to as "Wuxi opera". Since 1955, it has been officially named as "Wuxi opera". Wuxi opera was listed as the intangible cultural heritage by Suzhou, Wuxi and Changzhou respectively. On June 7, 2008, Wuxi opera was selected as the "Second National List of Intangible Cultural Heritage of China".

== Origin ==
Historically, the Taihu Lake basin area was the location of the ancient Wu Kingdom. Therefore, the local people living in the area have had the custom of singing folk songs since ancient times. This kind of art was called "Wu Yu" in the period of the Spring and Autumn period and Warring States. By the middle of the Ming dynasty, these folk songs had evolved into the art of folk rap and singing performances, such as folk tunes, a type of folk art called Tanhuang, and storytelling, among others.

During the reign of Emperor Jiaqing, a craftsman named A Zeng's son, Xu Jinqiao, accepted Wang Wenxiang as his apprentice, and they paired up to sing duets. They also re-structured folk song minor tunes into a new form, with 18 and a half rhymes. Nowadays, this type of structure is called "Wuxi Tanhuang".

== Performance characteristics ==
Wuxi opera has a variation of upper and lower tunes. First of all, Wuxi opera has a Huang Tune, the oldest tune of Wuxi opera. Huang Tune originated from long narrative folk songs in the southern region of the Yangtze River Delta, and as such, absorbed folk tune styles such as "Suzhou Tanci". Huang Tune includes old Huang Tune, Huang Tune Adagio, Anti-Bow Pantaloon's Tune, Allegro, Long Three-Tune and other different types of tunes. Huang Tune is a kind of melody with narrative feelings, rich melodies and cheerful rhythms. Instrumental accompaniment is mainly performed on the Erhu, while the Pipa, Sanxian and Dulcimer are often played as subsidiary instruments; Xiao, Flute and Zhonghu are also included in the music.

== Factions ==
- Binbin Tune was begun by Wang Binbin (1921–2008).
- Faction Mei was begun by Mei Lanzhen (1927–2012).
- Faction Wu was begun by Wu Yatong (1919–2016).
- Faction Yao was begun by Yao Cheng (1926–). (Yao Cheng is the mother of author Ye Zhaoyan)

== Traditional opera ==
There are more than 200 traditional Wuxi operas, including "The Magic Lotus Lantern", "Wu Song Kills Sister-in-Law", "Xue Gang in Lantern Show", "Jin Yunu","Zhaojun Departs for the Frontier", "Pearl Tower", "Drawing the Golden Phoenix", "Meng Lijun", "Butterfly Lovers", "The Emerald Hairpin", "Double Pearl Phoenix", "He Wenxiu", "Bean-Curd House" and "Two Degrees Plum".

== Representative artists ==
- Yuan Renyi, Zhou Fuyi
- Three men as a tripod alike: Shen Ahuan, Zheng Guifen, Kuang Yaoliang.
- Three women as a tripod alike: Bai Yuxiu, Zhou Juying, Xu Linmei.
- Four men playing the role of male actors: Li Ruxiang, Jin Dexiang, Zhou Baoxiang, Yang Yunxiang.
- Jiangsu Province Wuxi Opera Troupe: Yao Cheng, Wang Lanying, Shen Peihua, Ni Tongfang, Zhou Dongliang.
- Wuxi City Wuxi Opera Troupe: Wang Binbin, Mei Lanzhen, Ji Meifang, Wang Yunzhi, Wang Binbin(younger), Yuan Mengya, Pan Peiqiong, Huang Jinghui.
- Changzhou City Wuxi Opera Troupe: Wu Yatong, Shen Suzhen, Yang Qiwen, Cui Longhai, Wang Shengbiao, Shen Huilan.
