= Kunqu =

Branch of Chinese opera

Kun Qu opera
- UNESCO Intangible Cultural Heritage
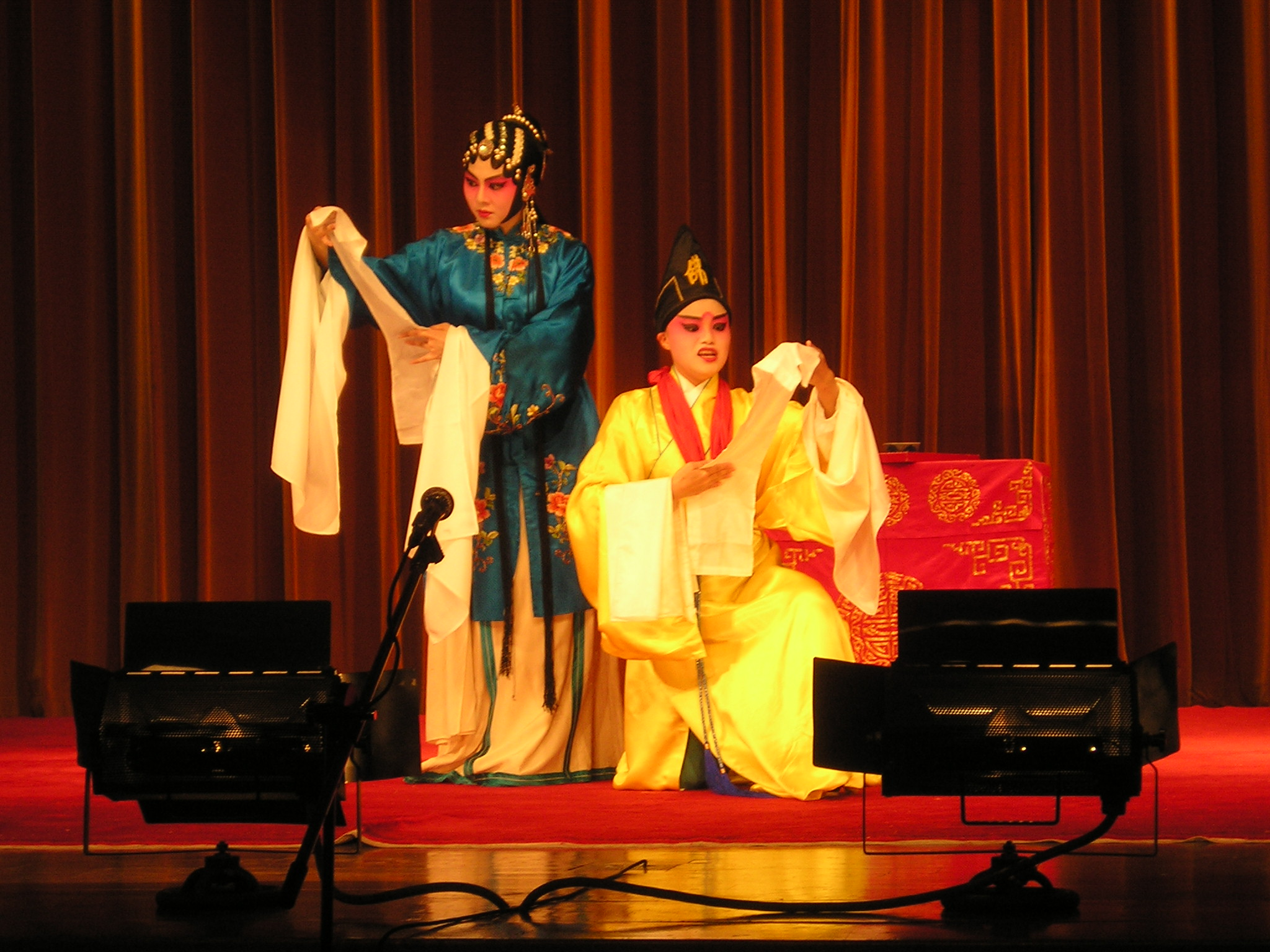
- Country: China
- Reference: 4
- Region: Asia-Pacific region

Inscription history
- Inscription: 2001 (3rd session)
- List: Representative
- UNESCO Cultural Heritage

Kunqu
- Traditional Chinese: 崑曲
- Simplified Chinese: 昆曲
- Literal meaning: "Kunshan Melody"
Transcriptions
Standard Mandarin
- Hanyu Pinyin: Kūnqǔ
- Gwoyeu Romatzyh: Kuencheu
- Wade–Giles: K'un^{1}-ch'ü^{3}
- IPA: [kʰwə́n.tɕʰỳ]
Yue: Cantonese
- Yale Romanization: Kwānkūk
- Jyutping: Kwan^{1} Kuk^{1}
- IPA: [kʷʰɐn˥.kʰʊk̚˥]
Southern Min
- Tâi-lô: Khun-khik

Kunqu (Chinese: 崑曲, simplified: 昆曲), also known as Kunju (崑劇), K'un-ch'ü, Kun opera or Kunqu opera, is one of the oldest extant forms of Chinese opera. It evolved from a music style local to Kunshan, part of the Wu cultural area, and later came to dominate Chinese theater from the 16th to the 18th centuries. Wei Liangfu refined the musical style of kunqu, and it gained widespread popularity when Liang Chenyu used the style in his drama Huansha ji (Washing Silken Gauze). Well-known pieces of Kunqu opera included The Peony Pavilion from the Ming dynasty. Kunqu performances combine music, dance, poetry, and acting.

The melody or tune of Kunqu is one of the Four Great Characteristic Melodies in Chinese opera. It is known for its elegant lyrics, graceful style and delicate performance. It is one of the operas grouped under Southern Opera, and it is known as the "ancestor of a hundred operas". Kunqu uses drum and board to provide rhythm to the tunes, with flute, sanxian and so on as the main accompanying instrument. The opera is sung in "Zhongzhou rhyme". In 2001, Kunqu was proclaimed one of the Masterpieces of the Oral and Intangible Heritage of Humanity by UNESCO. and it was inscribed on the Representative List of Intangible Cultural Heritage of Humanity in 2008.

== History ==
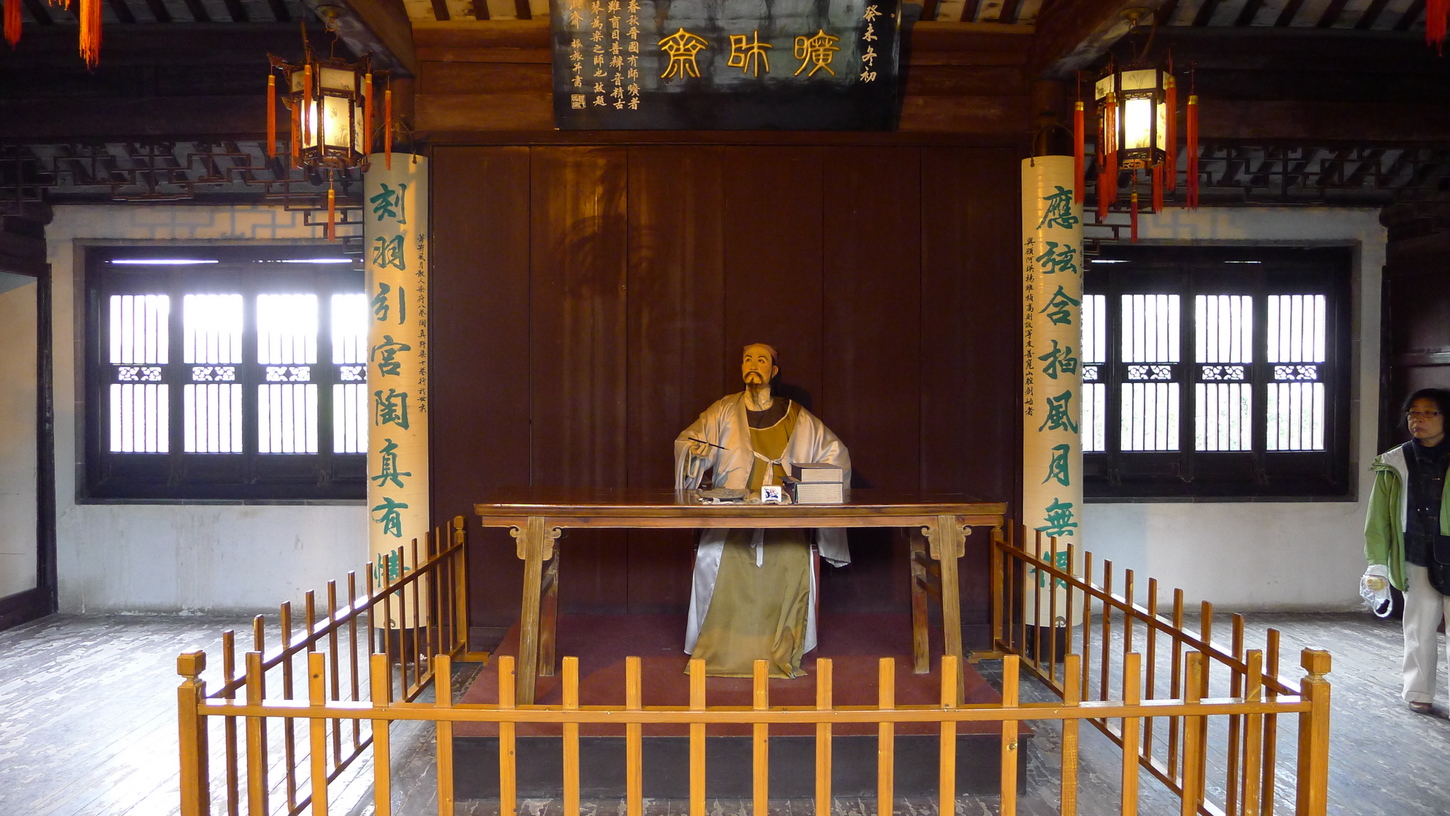
Gu Jian, allegedly a transmitter of the Kunshan music in the Yuan dynasty

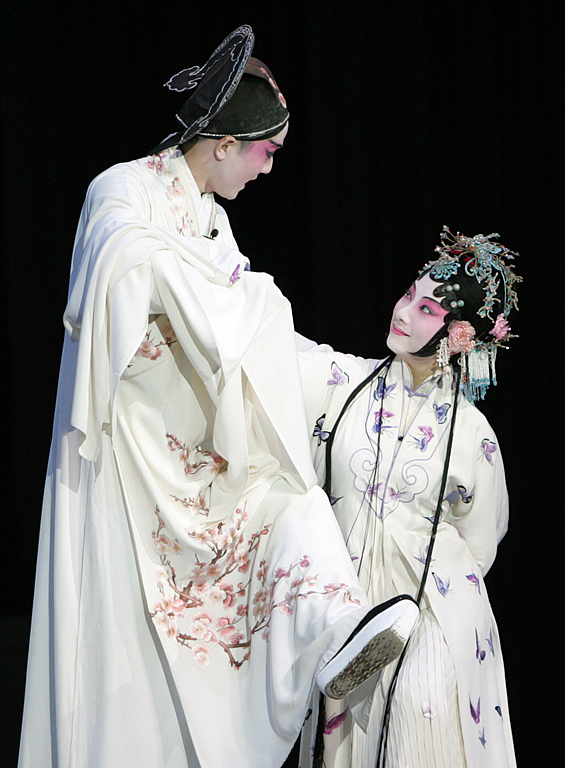
A scene from The Peony Pavilion

Kunqu refers to Kunshan tune (昆山腔, Kūnshān qiāng), a repertory of songs and performances from Kunshan in Suzhou. The Kunshan tune is generally believed to have been developed during the Ming dynasty by Wei Liangfu (魏良輔), who was from the port of Taicang. A more recent discovery, however, suggests that Kunshan tune was introduced in the late Yuan dynasty by Gu Jian (顾坚), who developed an early form of Kunqu with a group of musicians in Kunshan. Nevertheless, Wei is believed to have modified Kunshan tune with songs of Haiyan (海鹽) near Hangzhou and Yiyang (弋陽) of Jiangxi; he also combined nanxi rhythms, which often used flute, with the northern zaju style, where plucked string instruments were preferred. The resultant elegant Kunshan tunes are often called "water mill" tunes (水磨調, shuimo diao).

Kunqu operas are chuanqi-style operas but incorporating Kunshan tune throughout. An opera, Washing Silken Gauze (浣紗記, Huan Sha Ji) written by a Kunshan native Liang Chenyu (梁辰魚), has been described as the first Kunqu opera. The story of Washing Silken Gauze was based on Spring and Autumn Annals of Wu and Yue, and the use of elegant "water mill" tunes in the opera earned it wide praise from scholars. Kunqu operas then became popular throughout China, and the emergence of Kunqu is said to have ushered in a "second Golden Era of Chinese drama".

The most famous Kunqu opera is The Peony Pavilion written by Tang Xianzu in the Ming dynasty. Other important works include The Palace of Eternal Life written by Hong Sheng, and The Peach Blossom Fan by Kong Shangren written in the early Qing period. The operas were not necessarily performed in full, but may be performed as excerpts or highlights called zhézixì (折子戲), which became the norm by 1760s and over 400 pieces of these were known.

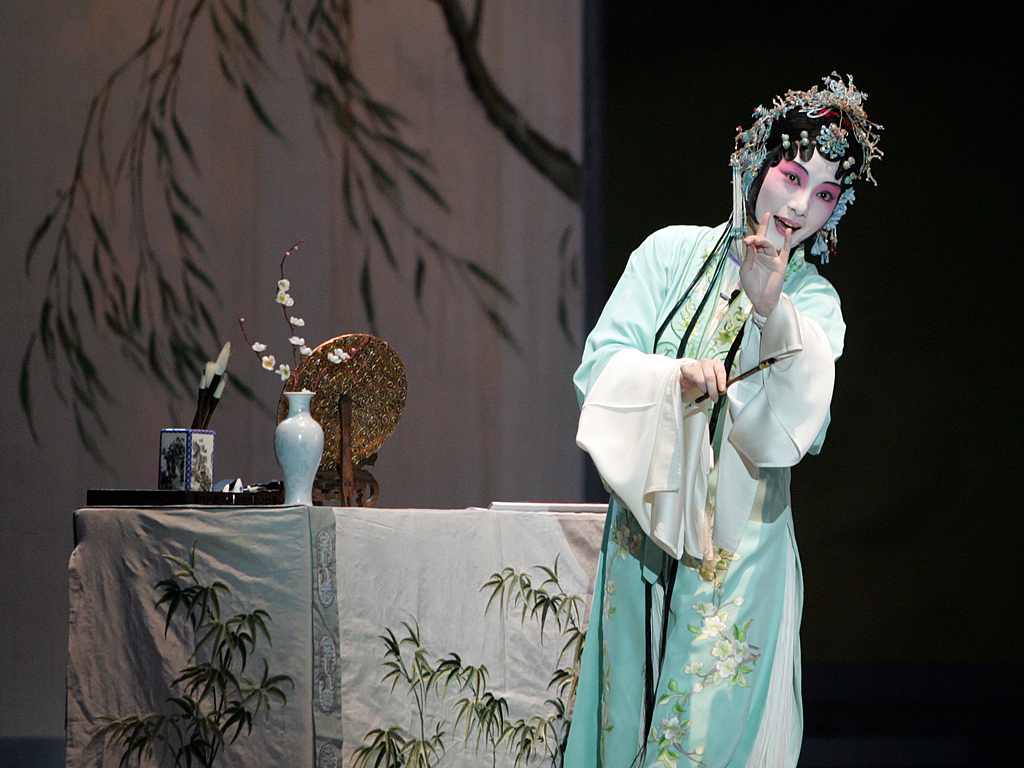
Kunqu performance at the Peking University

Kunqu performance influenced the performance of many other styles of Chinese musical theater, including Peking opera, which contains much of the Kunqu repertoire. Kunqu was referred to as Yabu (雅部, "elegant drama"), and it came under competition from a variety of operas (e.g. Shaanxi opera, Clapper opera, Yiyang tunes, Peking opera, etc.) termed Huabu (花部, "flowery drama"), and as a result, Kunqu troupes experienced a commercial decline in the 19th century.

In the early 20th century, the cultural elite tried to re-establish Kunqu, and the Academy was founded in 1921 to train performers. In 1919 Mei Lanfang and Han Shichang, renowned performers of Kunqu, traveled to Japan to give performances. In the 1930s, Mei performed Kunqu in the United States and the Soviet Union and was well received. It was later subsidized by the Communist state, but like most traditional forms of Chinese opera, Kunqu was banned during the Cultural Revolution. Kunqu began to revive by the mid-1990s, and it was then declared a Masterpiece of the Oral and Intangible Heritage of Humanity by UNESCO in 2001, and received generous support by the government, and experienced a great increase in popularity by 2004.

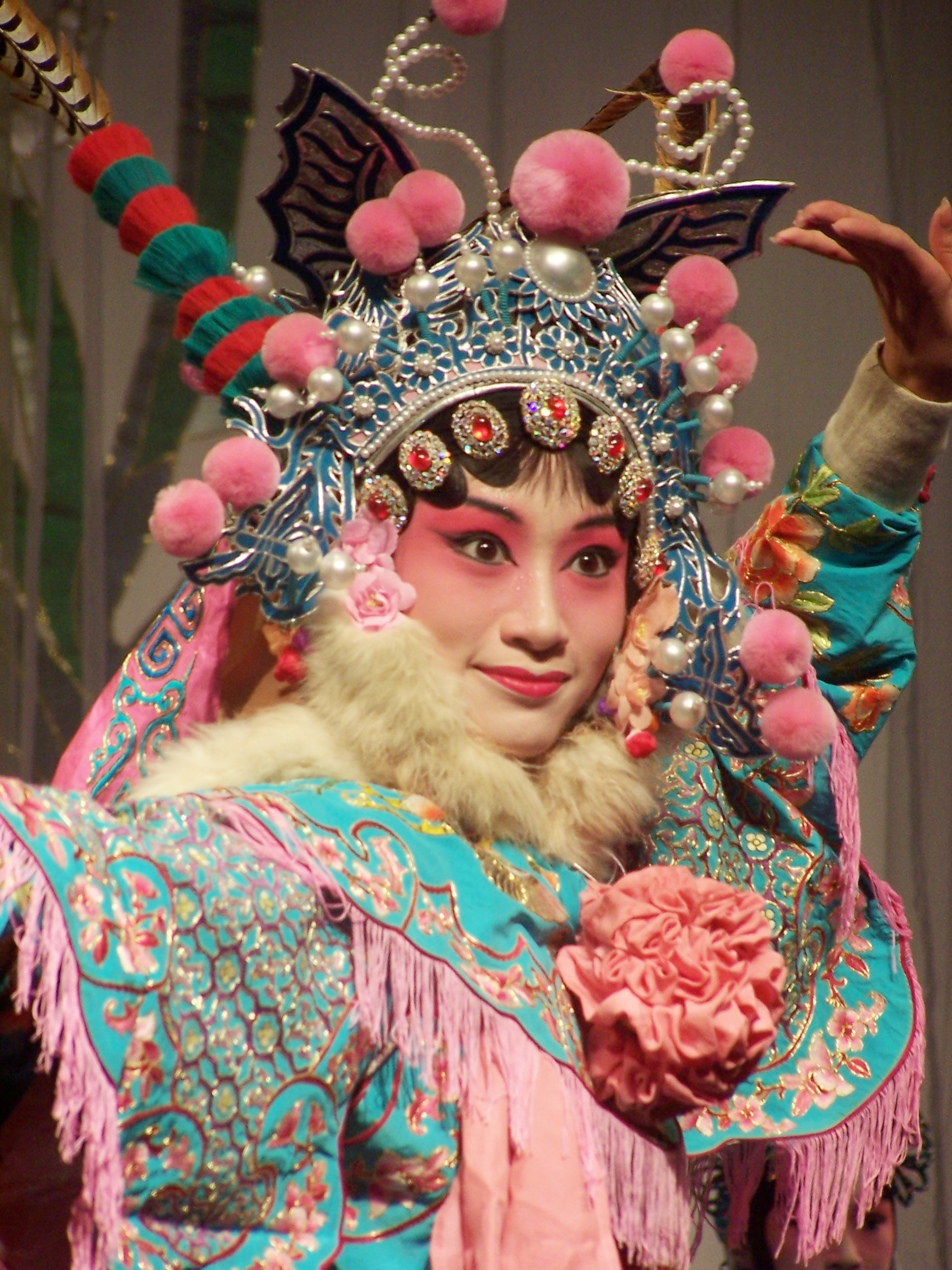
A Kunqu performer's portrayal of Hu Sanniang

Today, Kunqu is professionally performed in seven major mainland Chinese cities: Beijing (Northern Kunqu Theater), Shanghai (Shanghai Kunqu Theater), Suzhou (Suzhou Kunqu Theater), Nanjing (Jiangsu Province Kun Opera), Chenzhou (Hunan Kunqu Theater), Yongjia County/Wenzhou (Yongjia Kunqu Theater) and Hangzhou (Zhejiang Province Kunqu Theater), as well as in Taipei. Non-professional opera societies are active in many other cities in China and abroad, and opera companies occasionally tour. In 2006, Zhou Bing acted as a producer and art director for Kunqu sexcentenary. It won Outstanding Documentary Award of 24th China TV Golden Eagle Awards; it won Award of TV Art Features of 21st Starlight Award for 2006.

== Recognition ==
Kunqu Opera was listed as a masterpiece of the Oral and Intangible Heritage of Humanity by UNESCO in 2001, and was included in the Masterpiece of the Intangible Cultural Heritage of Humanity in 2008.

In December 2018, the General Office of the Ministry of Education announced support and protection of Kunqu as an Intangible Heritage of Chinese culture. Kunqu opera was showcased in the 2019 Chinese Opera Culture Week on Oct 2, 2019.

== Characteristics ==
Kunqu opera performance is characterized by strong lyricism, delicate movements, and the harmonious combination of singing and dancing. Kunqu opera is a comprehensive art of song, dance, mediation, and white performance, and the performance characteristics of singing and dancing have been formed in the long-term performance history, especially reflected in the performance body of each character, and its dance body can be roughly divided into two types: one is the auxiliary posture when speaking and the dance of rewriting the intention developed by gestures; one is a lyrical dance with singing lyrics, which is not only a superb dance move, but also an effective means to express the character's character and the meaning of the lyrics. Singing, unlike other operas, can be given free play according to the individual conditions of the actors.

The opera dance of Kunqu opera has absorbed and inherited the traditions of ancient folk dance and court dance, and has accumulated rich experience in the close integration of rap and dance through long-term stage performance practice. To meet the needs of the performance venue of narrative writing, many dance performances that focus on description are created, and cooperate with "drama" to become a folding drama with a strong story. Adapted to the needs of the performance venue with strong lyricism and movement, many lyrical dance performances have been created, which have become the main performance means of many single-fold lyric song and dance.

The nianbai (念白; spoken portions) of Kunqu opera is also very characteristic, because Kunqu opera was developed from Wuzhong area, so its voice has the characteristics of Wu Nong soft language. Among them, there are also local nianbai based on the Wu dialect, such as Su Bai, Yangzhou Bai, etc. The language in the Wuzhong area has a strong sense of life, and often uses allegro (music)-style rhyme scheme, which is very distinctive. In addition, the singing of Kunqu opera has extremely strict specifications for the sound of words, lines, rhythm, etc., forming a complete singing theory.

The main difference between Nankun (South Kun) and Beikun (North Kun) is not the geographical location of the troupe, but whether the music is southern or northern. Kunqu qupai music can be divided into vocal qupai and instrumental qupai according to its different uses.

=== Industry ===
Kunqu opera roles are divided into three broad categories: Dan, Sheng and Jing or Chou.

Because the early Kun opera belongs to the Southern opera system, it inherits the role industry system of the Southern opera, and simultaneously absorbs that of the Northern Zaju, taking the basic roles of Sheng, Dan, Jing, Mei, Chou, outer and paste seven acts.

Huan Sha Ji, an early work, reflects the character branch method in the early stage of Kun opera. In addition to following the seven lines of Southern opera, it also borrowed the setting method of Xiao Mei and Xiao Dan in Yuan Zaju, and added five lines of Xiao Sheng, Xiao Dan, Xiao Mei, Xiao Wai and Xiao Jing, a total of twelve lines.

During the boom of Kun opera in the late Ming dynasty, in the Ming edition of the legend of Mohan Zhai, the original "tie" was changed to "Old Dan", which also absorbed the branch method of Zaju in the Yuan dynasty. Other roles are basically the same as Kun opera in the early period. During the Kangxi period of the Qing dynasty, Kun opera maintained the system of "twelve characters in rivers and lakes" (江湖).

With the development of performing arts in the Qianlong period, the division of roles in Kun opera became detailed. Between Jia and Dao, the role industry of Kun opera combines the original "twelve roles in rivers and lakes" with the later more detailed division of roles. Under the five lines of "Sheng, Dan, Jing, Mo and Chou", there are twenty smaller lines, called "twenty doors". Traditional Kun opera professional troupes usually only have 18 actors, while only a few large troupes have 27 actors. As long as ten roles are complete, other roles can be replaced by other actors in close roles. The ten basic roles are: Jing, Zhengsheng, Jinsheng, Laosheng, Mo, Zhengdan, five Dan, six Dan, Fu, Chou.

Each line of Kun opera has developed its own set of procedures and techniques in performance.

=== Stage art ===
It includes three aspects: rich clothing styles, exquisite colors and decorations, and the use of faces.

In addition to inheriting the costume styles of opera characters since the Yuan and Ming dynasties, some costumes of Kunqu opera are very similar to the clothes that were popular in society at that time. Reflected in the play, military generals have their own uniforms, and civil officials also have a variety of clothes according to the class hierarchy of feudal society. Lian Pu (face painting) is used for Jing and Chou roles. Very few characters belonging to Sheng and Dan are also used, such as Monkey King (生) and Zhong Wuyan (Dan), and the colors are basically red, white, and black.

Kunqu opera art has formed a fairly perfect system, and this system has long occupied a dominant position in Chinese opera, so Kunqu opera art is revered as the "ancestor of a hundred operas", which has a profound impact on the development of the entire opera genre. Many local operas have absorbed its artistic nutrients to varying degrees, among which there are still some Kunqu operas.

== Significance ==
Kunqu opera is the oldest existing drama form in China with a complete performance system, which has had a profound influence on later Chinese operas.

Chinese opera has been spreading on the stage since its formation. With the change of time, the script, the voice and the performance are constantly changing. Kunqu opera, on the other hand, is known as a "living fossil" with less changes and more traditional features of traditional operas. It is the only one of the three ancient operas in the world that has been preserved so far. It is also the representative of the traditional culture and art of the Han nationality.

== By region ==
Kunshan singing, initially limited to the Suzhou area, began to spread, and during the Wanli period, it expanded to the south of the Yangtze River and north of the Qiantang River with Suzhou as the center. Due to the extensive performance activities of Kunban, in the last years of Wanli, Kunqu opera was introduced to Beijing and Hunan through Yangzhou, ranking first among all voices and becoming the standard singing tone of legendary scripts: 四方歌曲必宗吴门 (all songs must respect Wumen). At the end of the Ming dynasty and the beginning of the Qing dynasty, Kunqu opera spread to Sichuan, Guizhou and Guangdong, and developed into a national drama.

The singing of Kunqu opera was originally based on the Wu language pronunciation of Suzhou, but after it was introduced to various places, it merged with local dialects and folk music to derive many genres, forming a Kunqu vocal music system and becoming a representative opera for the whole nation.

In the Qing dynasty, the Kangxi Emperor loved Kunqu opera, which made it even more popular. In this way, the Kunshan singing became the most influential opera style from the middle of the Ming dynasty to the middle of the Qing dynasty. During the Qianlong period of the Qing dynasty, the development of Kunqu opera entered its heyday, and since then Kunqu opera has begun to dominate the Pear Garden, which has lasted for six or seven hundred years.

=== Fujian ===
The earliest recorded introduction of the Kunshan dialect into Fujian was in 1574 during the Wanli period of the Ming dynasty (1573–1619). Kunqu opera is widely distributed in Fujian, and has had some influence on local operas in Fujian more or less, directly or indirectly. In the Confucian drama founded by Cao Xuefu at the end of Ming dynasty, the main vocal cavity, "Douqiang", contains the components of Kunshan dialect. For example, in the representative opera Ziyuchai, the main tune is "13 tunes". Kunqu opera also appears in the folk form of sitting and singing. 35 years into the Qianlong period (1770), Jian'ou County established the "Zhai Ya Lin Qu Society" which learned to sing Kunqiang, commonly known as "singing a big tune".

=== Zhejiang ===
Kunqu opera, commonly known as "Cao Kun" and "Jin Kun", is a Kunqu opera spread in the Jinhua area of Zhejiang. It is called "Cao Kun" because of its simplification or change of local customs in language and melody. Because of the long-term travelling performances in rural grasslands and temple fairs, farmers are the main audience, the language is more popular, the singing tone is not rigidly four-tone style, and operas pursue plot twists and turns, mainly performing martial arts or work drama. Since the Ming dynasty, it has been regarded as authentic Wu opera. In fact, Kunqu opera is a tributary of Quzhou and Jinhua.

== Performers ==
- Mei Lanfang
- Zhang Jiqing
- Hua Wenyi
- Yan Huizhu
- Zhang Jun

== Notable works ==
- The Injustice to Dou E (adapted from Guan Hanqing's zaju)
- The Western Mansion (Southern version, adapted from Wang Shifu's zaju)
- Tale of the Pipa (Gao Ming)
- The Peony Pavilion (Tang Xianzu)
- The Palace of Long Life (Hong Sheng)
- The Peach Blossom Fan (Kong Shangren)
- The White Snake
- The Kite (Li Yu)
