= Wang Bin (executive) =

Chinese former business executive (born 1958)

- 王滨
- Born: November 1958 (age 67); Harbin, Heilongjiang, China
- Education: Southwestern University of Finance and Economics; Nankai University
- Occupations: Business executive, economist
- Years active: 1975–2022
- Political party: Chinese Communist Party (1985–2022; expelled)

Chinese name
- Traditional Chinese: 王濱
- Simplified Chinese: 王滨
Transcriptions
Standard Mandarin
- Hanyu Pinyin: Wáng Bīn

Wang Bin (Chinese: 王滨; born November 1958) is a Chinese former business executive and senior economist who served as chairman and party secretary of China Life Insurance Company from 2018 to 2022 and chairman and party secretary of China Taiping Insurance Group Limited from 2012 to 2018.

In January 2022 he came under investigation by China's top anti-corruption agency and was later convicted. He was a representative of the 19th National Congress of the Chinese Communist Party and a member of the Social and Legal Affairs Committee of the 13th National Committee of the Chinese People's Political Consultative Conference.

== Early life ==
Wang was born in Harbin, Heilongjiang, in November 1958. During the late Cultural Revolution, he worked as a sent-down youth in a farm of his home-province.

== Career ==
Beginning in July 1983, he served in several posts in Heilongjiang Provincial People's Government, including staff of Department of Commerce, staff of Economic Reform Commission, and secretary of General Office of Heilongjiang Provincial People's Government. He joined the Chinese Communist Party in February 1985.

In September 1990, he became deputy director of Heilongjiang Branch Office of the People's Bank of China, and nine months later, he was transferred to Beijing and appointed head of Secretariat of the General Office of the People's Bank of China. He served in various posts in the Agricultural Development Bank of China before serving as president of Tianjin Branch of the Bank of Communications in January 2000. In December 2002, he was appointed president of Beijing Branch of the Bank of Communications. After this office was terminated in May 2005, he became vice president of the Bank of Communications, serving until March 2012.

In March 2012, he was appointed chairman and party secretary of China Taiping Insurance Group Limited, a position at vice-ministerial level, he remained in that position until September 2018, when he was made chairman and party secretary of China Life Insurance Company.

=== Downfall ===
On 8 January 2022, Wang was put under investigation for alleged "serious violations of discipline and laws" by the Central Commission for Discipline Inspection (CCDI), the party's internal disciplinary body, and the National Supervisory Commission, the highest anti-corruption agency of China.

On September 1, he was expelled from the CCP and dismissed from public office. On 12 September 2023, Wang was sentenced to death, suspended for two years, then commuted to a life sentence with no possibility of parole, in an order by the intermediate court in Jinan, Shandong. he was found guilty of taking 325 million yuan in bribes and illegally hiding 54.2 million yuan in overseas accounts.

Business positions
Preceded by Yang Mingsheng	Chairman of China Life Insurance Company; 2018–2022	Succeeded by Bai Tao
Party political offices
Preceded by Yang Mingsheng	Communist Party Secretary of China Life Insurance Company; 2018–2022	Succeeded by Bai Tao
