= Central South University of Forestry and Technology =

Public university in Changsha, Hunan, China

Coordinates: 28°08′21″N 112°59′31″E

- 中南林业科技大学
- Other names: CSUFT
- Motto: 求是求新，树木树人
- Motto in English: Seek truth and innovation; nurture trees and people
- Type: Public university
- Established: 1911; 115 years ago
- Parent institution: Hunan Provincial People's Government and National Forestry and Grassland Administration (co-sponsored)
- Affiliations: Hunan Provincial Department of Education
- Chairman: Wu Yiqiang (吴义强)
- President: Qiu Yi (仇怡)
- Academic staff: c. 2,300 (2022)
- Students: c. 31,500 (including junior college and graduate students)
- Location: 498 Shaoshan South Road, Tianxin District, Changsha, Hunan, China, Changsha, Hunan, China
- Campus: Urban, 2,230 mu
- Website: www.csuft.edu.cn

Central South University of Forestry and Technology (CSUFT; 中南林业科技大学), also known as Linkeda (林科大), is a full-time public university in Changsha, Hunan, China. It is sponsored by the Hunan Provincial People's Government and co-built by the provincial government and the National Forestry and Grassland Administration. The university traces its origins to forestry and agricultural institutions established in 1911, and today is a comprehensive research university with a traditional strength in forestry and ecological disciplines alongside engineering, science, management, economics, law, literature and arts. CSUFT is one of the earliest institutions in Hunan to enroll graduate students after the restoration of China’s graduate education system, the first provincial university in Hunan to establish a graduate school, and a university with the right to recommend outstanding undergraduates for exemption from entrance examinations to graduate programs. The university has been selected for several national and provincial initiatives, including Midwestern Higher Education Infrastructure Construction Project, the Characteristic Key Disciplines Program, the State Construction High-Level University Public Graduate Program, the first cohort of pilot universities in the Excellent Agricultural and Forestry Talents Education and Training Program, and the Hunan “2011 Plan”. It is designated as Hunan Province's “Double First-Class Construction institution.

== History ==
CSUFT’s roots can be traced to 1911, when the Guangdong Provincial Agricultural and Forestry Experiment Station and its attached training institute for agricultural and forestry teachers were established. In 1958, the Hunan Provincial People's Committee approved the creation of Hunan Forestry College (湖南林学院).

In 1963, Hunan Forestry College merged with the Department of Forestry of South China Agricultural College to form Central South Forestry College (中南林学院) in Guangzhou.

In 1974, the college moved back to Hunan and operated in Fushuiwan (now Dajiangkou Town) in Xupu County, western Hunan, where the former campus site is still preserved. In 1978, the State Council of the People's Republic of China approved the restoration of the name "Central South Forestry College". In the early 1980s, the college began constructing a new campus on the outskirts of Zhuzhou, and by 1985 the institution had fully relocated to Zhuzhou.

In the early 2000s, several institutions, including Hunan Forestry School, Hunan Forestry Technical School, Hunan Agricultural Machinery Research Institute and Hunan Economic Management Cadre College, were successively merged into the university. The main body of the university moved from Zhuzhou to Changsha in 2003.

In December 2005, the Ministry of Education approved the change of name from Central South Forestry College to Central South University of Forestry and Technology.

== Campus ==
The main campus of CSUFT is located on Shaoshan South Road in Tianxin District, Changsha, near the Hunan Academy of Forestry, the railway campus of Central South University, and Tiedao Xueyuan station on Changsha Metro Line 1. The campus lies in a subtropical monsoon climate zone, with abundant rainfall in spring, hot and relatively dry summers and autumns, and short winters. The terrain is dominated by small hills, and the teaching, residential and recreation areas are heavily planted with trees and greenery.

The university also operates the Lutou Experimental Forest Farm in Pingjiang County, Yueyang, which provides a base for teaching and field research in forestry and related disciplines.

== Academics and research ==
CSUFT is a comprehensive university with a disciplinary structure centered on agriculture and forestry, and coordinated development in engineering, science, management, economics, law, literature, and arts. The university has six first-level doctoral degree–granting disciplines, twenty first-level academic master’s disciplines, and sixteen professional master’s degree categories, and it offers 80 undergraduate majors. The university has established a complete degree system spanning bachelor's, master's and doctoral education.

Several disciplines are considered strong within China’s higher-education system. CSUFT hosts national and ministerial key disciplines and key construction disciplines under the National Forestry and Grassland Administration and Hunan Province. Agricultural science, engineering, and environmental ecology at CSUFT have entered the top 1 % globally according to Essential Science Indicators. In addition to its traditional strengths in agriculture, forestry and biological sciences, programs such as English, mechanical design and manufacturing, and computer science have also received recognition from the Ministry of Education.

=== Organization ===
Historically, Central South Forestry College had only two departments and six specialties in 1976. After the restoration of the national college entrance examination in 1977, the number of departments and majors increased steadily. As of the early 2020s, CSUFT has more than twenty teaching units, including the College of Forestry, College of Life Science and Technology, College of Materials Science and Engineering, College of Mechanical and Electrical Engineering, College of Landscape Architecture, College of Computer and Information Engineering, Business School, School of Economics, School of Law, School of Foreign Languages, School of Physical Education, School of Tourism, Music School, and Bangor College (a joint China–foreign institute), among others.

=== Faculty ===
As of 2022, CSUFT has more than 2,300 staff members, including over 960 with senior professional titles. The university counts one academician of the Chinese Academy of Engineering, four double-appointed academicians, and a number of scholars selected for national and provincial talent programs, such as Changjiang Scholars, the “Ten Thousand Talents Program”, National Science Fund for Excellent Young Scholars (Excellent Young Scientists Fund), National Forestry and Grassland Science and Technology Innovation Talent, “Furong Scholar”, Hunan Scientific and Technological Leading Talent and Hunan Think Tank Leading Talent, among others.

=== Research centers and key laboratories ===
The university has established a number of research institutions and platforms in forestry, bamboo and wood industries, biomass materials and related areas. These include the Hunan Engineering Research Center for Bamboo Industry, the Hunan Engineering Technology Research Center for Bamboo and Wood Processing, the Hunan Provincial Key Laboratory of Biomass Materials and Green Conversion Technology, and the National–Local Joint Engineering Research Center for Green Processing Technology of Agricultural and Forestry Biomass, among others. Research conducted at CSUFT has contributed to areas such as Camellia oleifera cultivation and disease control and the development of China’s bamboo and wood industries. In earlier decades, research at Central South Forestry College received national and provincial science and technology awards for work on pine resin extraction, wood-based panels and related fields.

=== Library ===
The university library was established around the time of the founding of the institution. By 2022, the library held approximately 2.486 million printed volumes, 60 literature databases, 2.065 million e-books, about 51,000 electronic journals (totaling some 963,000 volumes), and roughly 11.554 million electronic theses and dissertations.

=== Publications ===
CSUFT sponsors several academic journals, including Journal of Central South University of Forestry and Technology, Economic Forest Research (经济林研究) and Furniture & Interior Design (家具与室内装饰). Economic Forest Research is regarded as the first comprehensive scientific and technical journal on economic forest species in mainland China. Furniture & Interior Design, founded in 1994, is the official journal of the Design Committee of the China National Furniture Association and publishes research and commentary on furniture and interior design, as well as related cultural and technological topics.

== Campus culture ==
Tao Zhu (陶铸), a prominent leader of the Chinese Communist Party and the People's Republic of China, played a role in defining the university’s development direction in its early years; he is commemorated on campus, including a plaza named in his honor.

The university motto is “求是求新，树木树人” (“Seek truth and innovation; nurture trees and people”), reflecting its emphasis on both scientific rigor and the cultivation of forestry professionals. The official school song is titled 《科技栋梁之歌》 (“Song of the Pillars of Science and Technology”).

== International cooperation ==
CSUFT has developed a number of international collaborations in teaching and research. In October 2013, the Ministry of Education approved the establishment of Bangor College, a joint institute of Central South University of Forestry and Technology and Bangor University in the United Kingdom, which is the first sino-foreign cooperative educational institution in Hunan Province. The college imports Bangor’s strengths in areas such as forestry and environmental sciences and uses English-medium instruction to train internationally oriented graduates; students can also use this platform to pursue further study abroad in the UK.

The university has also participated in the “Human Resource Development Project in Hunan Province” supported by the Japan International Cooperation Agency (JICA) and has established academic cooperation with institutions such as the University of Toyama in Japan. Faculty and students regularly undertake study visits and joint research in Japan in cooperation with universities and enterprises.

In the 21st century, CSUFT has responded to the national “Belt and Road Initiative” by deepening cooperation with participating countries, recruiting international students and promoting the transfer of scientific and technological achievements abroad. The university has taken part in greening work at Gwadar Port in Pakistan and in the construction of a Belt and Road–related key laboratory for tropical and arid economic plants, helping to promote economic forest development in arid regions and enhancing its international influence.

== Notable alumni ==
- Hua Chenyu (花粥), singer and songwriter
- Liu Jun (born 1957) Chinese politician
