= Suzhou opera =

- Traditional Chinese: 蘇劇
- Simplified Chinese: 苏剧
- Literal meaning: Suzhou opera
Transcriptions
Standard Mandarin
- Hanyu Pinyin: sūjù
- Gwoyeu Romatzyh: sujiuh

Suju (Chinese: 蘇劇), or Suzhou opera is a combination of various Chinese operas from Suzhou, including Tanhuang, Nanci and Kunqu. The opera is typically sung in Suzhou dialect of Wu Chinese. Suzhou opera originated in Suzhou city, the cultural center of China's Jiangnan area.

Suzhou opera is accompanied by traditional Chinese instruments, including dizi (transverse bamboo flute), erhu (two-stringed fiddle), pipa (pear-shaped lute), yangqin (hammered dulcimer), and percussion. The instrumentation and style are closely related to the instrumental genre of Jiangnan sizhu.

Suzhou opera was listed China's state-level Intangible Cultural Heritage.

== See also ==
- Shanghai opera, derived from Suzhou opera
