= Zhang Yongze =

Chinese politician

- 张永泽

Vice Chairman of Tibet Autonomous Region
- In office May 2017 – January 2022
- Che Dalha; Yan Jinhai
- Preceded by: Fang Lingmin

Communist Party Secretary of Shannan
- In office June 2015 – May 2017
- Deputy: Pubu Dunzhu (mayor)
- Preceded by: Qimei Renzeng
- Succeeded by: Xu Chengcang

Mayor of Shannan
- In office April 2012 – June 2015
- Party Secretary: Qimei Renzeng
- Preceded by: Zhao Xianzhong
- Succeeded by: Pubu Dunzhu

Personal details
- Born: March 1969 (age 57) Qiubei County, Yunnan, China
- Party: Chinese Communist Party (1997–2022; expelled)
- Education: Chengdu University of Science and Technology; Sichuan Union University

Chinese name
- Simplified Chinese: 张永泽
- Traditional Chinese: 張永澤
Transcriptions
Standard Mandarin
- Hanyu Pinyin: Zhāng Yǒngzé

Zhang Yongze (Chinese: 张永泽; born March 1969) is a former Chinese politician who spent his entire career in southwest China's Tibet Autonomous Region. He was investigated by China's top anti-graft agency in January 2022. Previously he served as vice chairman of Tibet Autonomous Region and before that, mayor and party secretary of Shannan.

== Biography ==
Zhang was born in Qiubei County, Yunnan, in March 1969. In 1987, he was admitted to Chengdu University of Science and Technology, majoring in terrestrial hydrology. He began graduate work at Chengdu University of Science and Technology in 1991 and then Sichuan Union University in 1994. After graduating in 1997, he was assigned to the Chinese Research Academy of Environmental Sciences.

Zhang joined the Chinese Communist Party (CCP) in March 1997, and got involved in politics in June 1998, and was appointed deputy director of Environmental Protection Bureau of Tibet Autonomous Region, and five years later, he was promoted to the director position. He became mayor of Shannan, in April 2012, and then party secretary, the top political position in the city, beginning in June 2015. In May 2017, he took office as vice chairman of Tibet Autonomous Region, succeeding Fang Lingmin.

=== Downfall ===
On 8 January 2022, Zhang had been placed under investigation for "serious violations of discipline and laws" by the Central Commission for Discipline Inspection (CCDI), the party's internal disciplinary body, and the National Supervisory Commission, the highest anti-corruption agency of China. On July 7, he was expelled from the CCP and removed from public office.

Government offices
Preceded by Zhao Xianzhong (赵宪忠)	Mayor of Shannan; 2012–2015	Succeeded by Pubu Dunzhu
Preceded by Fang Lingmin	Vice Chairman of Tibet Autonomous Region; 2017–2022	Succeeded by TBA
Party political offices
Preceded by Qimei Renzeng	Communist Party Secretary of Shannan; 2015–2017	Succeeded by Xu Chengcang
