= Southwest Minzu University =

University in Chengdu, China

- 西南民族大学
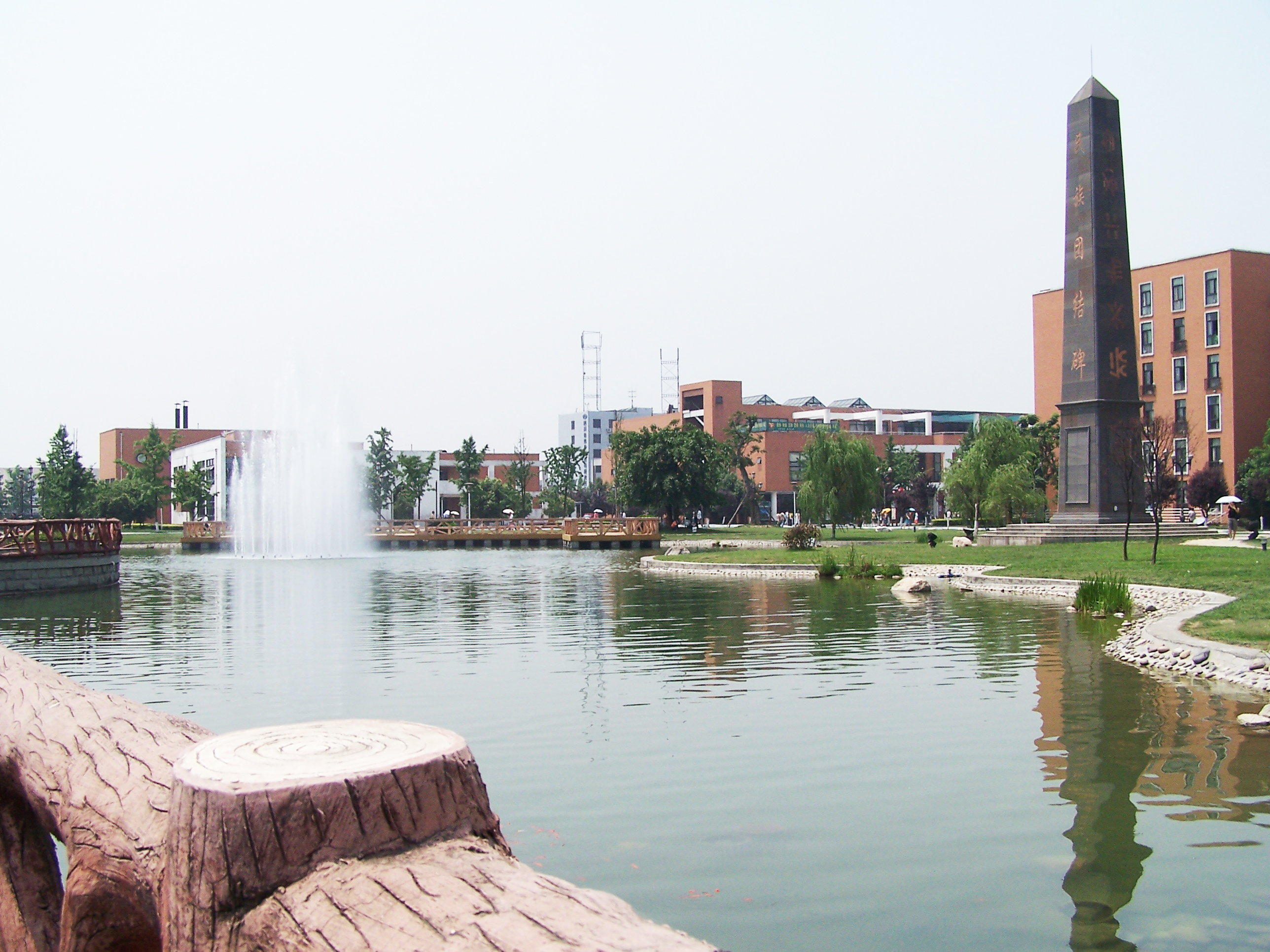
- Motto: 和合偕习，自信自强
- Motto in English: Consensus For Being Tuneful, Confidence For Being Powerful
- Type: Public
- Established: 1 June 1951; 75 years ago
- Affiliations: State Ethnic Affairs Commission
- President: 陈达云
- Academic staff: 1,900
- Students: 29,000
- Location: Chengdu, Sichuan, China
- Website: english.swun.edu.cn

Southwest Minzu University
- Simplified Chinese: 西南民族大学
- Traditional Chinese: 西南民族大學
Transcriptions
Standard Mandarin
- Hanyu Pinyin: Xīnán Mínzú Dàxué

Southwest Minzu University (Chinese: 西南民族大学; pinyin: Xīnán mínzú dàxué), formerly Southwest University for Nationalities (SWUN), is a multi-disciplinary higher education institute under the control of the State Ethnic Affairs Commission of China. The university was founded in July 1950 and officially established on June 1, 1951.

== Campuses ==
The university is in Chengdu and is in adjacent to the famous Wuhou Temple. It covers an area of over 3000 mu with 1120,000 square meters for construction area, over three campuses.

Its main campus is in Wuhou District, in the southwestern section of the 1st ring road encircling central Chengdu. The university has two other campuses: One is in Shuangliu county, near the airport; the Taipingyuan campus is outside the second ring road.

In addition the university maintains the Qinghai-Tibetan Plateau Ecological Environmental Protection and Advanced Technology for Animal Husbandry in Hongyuan County, Ngawa Tibetan and Qiang Autonomous Prefecture.

== Academics ==
- Colleges and Programs

Faculty	Level	Programs
College of Arts	Bachelor	Fine Art, Painting, Animation, Sculpture, Photography, Visual Communication Design, Dance, Choreography, Acting for Film, Musicology, Musical Performance(Instrument), Musical Performance(Vocality), Product Design, Fashion Design
College of Arts	Master	Fine Art, Studies of Music and Dance, Chinese Art of Ethnic Minority, Art
College of Arts	Doctor	Chinese Art of Ethnic Minority
College of Literature and Journalism	Bachelor	Chinese Linguistic Literature, Applied Linguistics (Teaching Chinese as a Foreign Language), Journalism, Studies of Radio, Film and Television
College of Literature and Journalism	Master	Chinese Linguistic Literature, Ancient Chinese Literature, Modern Chinese Literature, Chinese Classical Philology, Chinese Etymology, Studies of Art and Literature, Comparative Literature and World Literature, Linguistics and Applied Linguistics, Ethnic Literature and Communication, Aesthetics
College of Foreign Languages	Bachelor	English Language and Literature, Japanese Language and Literature, French Language and Literature, Korean Language and Literature
College of Foreign Languages	Master	Foreign Language and Literature, Foreign Linguistics and Applied Linguistics, English Language and Literature, Translation and Interpreting
College of Law	Bachelor	Studies of Law
College of Law	Master	Jurisprudence, Legal History, Constitution and Administrative Law, Science of Criminal Law, Civil Law and Commercial Law, Procedural Law
College of Law	Doctor	Studies On the System of Regional Autonomy For Ethnic Minorities
College of Management	Bachelor	Accountancy, Financial Management, Business Administration, Human Resource Management (HRM), Marketing, Administrative Management, Public Affairs Management, Logistics Management
College of Management	Master	Management Science and Engineering, Business Administration, Public Administration, Studies of Accountancy, Enterprise Management, Technology Economy and Management, Administrative Management, Educational Economics and Management, Social Security, Land Resource Management, Accountancy, Development of Rural Areas
College of Business and Economics	Bachelor	Science of Banking, International Economics and Trade, Economics, Public Finance, Insurance Studies, Investment Principles, Finance Engineering
College of Business and Economics	Master	Applied Economics (a.Finance; b.Regional Economics; c.National Economics; d.Industrial Economics; e.Public Finance; f.International Trade; g.Labor Economics; h.Quantitative Economics; i.National Defense Economy), Political Economy, Finance, Insurance,
College of Business and Economics	Doctor	Chinese Ethnic Economics
College of Business and Economics	Postdoctor	Economic and Social Development in Regions Inhabited by Ethnic Groups
College of Historical Culture & Tourism	Bachelor	Studies of History, Tourism Management, Studies of Cultural Relics & Museology, Ethnology, Management of Cultural Industry
College of Historical Culture & Tourism	Master	Archaeology, History of Particular Subjects, Tourism Management
College of Historical Culture & Tourism	Doctor	Economic Development in Southwestern Regions Inhabited by Ethnic Groups, Ecotourism and Resource Economics in Regions Inhabited by Ethnic Groups
College of Sociology & Psychology	Bachelor	Social Works, Applied Psychology, Sociology, Preschool Education
College of Sociology & Psychology	Master	Community Management
College of Electrical & Information Engineering	Bachelor	Electrical Engineering and Automation, Electrical and Information Engineering, Telecommunication Engineering, Automation, Educational Technology, Applied Physics, Physics
College of Electrical & Information Engineering	Master	Materials Science and Engineering, Materials Chemistry and Physics, Materials Science, Materials Processing Engineering, Electrical and Information Engineering
College of Computer Science & Technology	Bachelor	Computer Science and Technology, Software Engineering, Information Management and Information System, Information and Computing Science, Mathematics and Applied Mathematics, Network Engineering, Internet of Things Engineering
College of Computer Science & Technology	Master	Computer Science, Agricultural Informationization
College of Chemistry & Environment Protection Engineering	Bachelor	Chemistry, Applied Chemistry, Chemical Engineering & Technology, Environment Science, Materials Chemistry, Environment Engineering
College of Chemistry & Environment Protection Engineering	Master	Chemistry, Organic Chemistry, Chemicophysics, Polymeric Chemistry and Physics, Ethnic Pharmacochemistry
College of Life Science & Technology	Bachelor	Animal Medicine, Animal Pharmacy, Animal Science, Biotechnology, Food Science & Engineering, Food Quality and Safety
College of Life Science & Technology	Master	Animal Science, Veterinary Science, Agriculture, Veterinary, Animal Nutrition and Feed Science, Animal Genetics&Breeding and Reproduction Science, Animal By-Products Processing and Safety, Clinical Veterinary Science, Preventive Veterinary Medicine, Basic Veterinary Medicine, Science of Cultivation, Grass Industry, Food Processing and Safety
College of Architecture & Urban Planning	Bachelor	Architecture, Urban-rural Planning, Architecture Landscape, Environmental Design, Product Design
College of Architecture & Urban Planning	Master	Planning and Management For Regions Inhabited by Ethnic Groups
College of Pharmacy	Bachelor	Pharmaceutical Engineering, Pharmaceutical Preparation, Pharmacy, Science of Chinese Materia Medica, Science of Chinese Materia Medica (Traditional Yi Medicine), Science of Tibetan Medicine
College of Pharmacy	Master	Ethnic Pharmaceutical Chemistry
College of Physical Education	Bachelor	Social Sports Instruction & Management
College of Yi Studies	Bachelor	Chinese Ethnic Language and Literature (①Yi-Chinese Education; ②Yi-English Education; ③Yi-Japanese Education; ④Management of Yi's Cultural Industry; ⑤Yi-Chinese Translation & Interpreting; ⑥Yi Language and Literature), Historical Philology
College of Yi Studies	Master	Yi Language and Literature, Historical Bibliography
College of Yi Studies	Doctor	Yi Studies
College of Tibetan Studies	Bachelor	Chinese Ethnic Language and Literature (①Tibetan Language and Literature; ②Tibetan-English Education; ③Tibetan Studies; ④Tibetan-Chinese Administration; ⑤Management of Tibetan Cultural Industry), Ethnology (Tibetan Studies)
College of Tibetan Studies	Master	Tibetan Language and Literature, Logics, Indian Language and Literature
College of Tibetan Studies	Doctor	Tibetan Studies
College of Preparatory Education	N/A	Preparatory Courses (①Science; ②Liberal Arts; ③Entrusting Training)
College of Politics	Master	Marxist Philosophy, Chinese Philosophy, Foreign Philosophy, Ethics, Ethnic Philosophy
Institute of Western Ethnic Groups Studies	Master	Religious Studies
Institute of Qinghai-Tibetan Plateau	Master	Ecology, Science of Grass, Biology
