= Lute Song (musical) =

- Decca Records release
- Music: Raymond Scott
- Lyrics: Bernard Hanighen
- Book: Sidney Howard; Will Irwin
- Basis: Pi-Pa-Ji by Gao Ming
- Productions: 1946 Broadway

Lute Song is a 1946 American musical with a book by Sidney Howard and Will Irwin, music by Raymond Scott, and lyrics by Bernard Hanighen. It is based on the 14th-century Chinese play Tale of the Pipa (Pi-Pa-Ji) by Gao Ming. Though not a great success, the show is significant for Mary Martin's meeting of then-unknown cast member Yul Brynner, whom she later recommended to her friends Rodgers and Hammerstein for the role of the Siamese monarch in the classic The King and I, which premiered on Broadway in 1951. It was also the only Broadway appearance of Nancy Davis, future U.S. First Lady Nancy Reagan.

== Development ==
Cyril Birch, collaborator in a translation of The Peach Blossom Fan, wrote that presumably the basis of the American play was the 1846 Antoine (A. P. L.) Bazin French translation of the Chinese play Tale of the Pipa.

== Plot ==
The plot focuses on Tsai-Yong (Cai Yong), a young student who leaves his wife Tchao-Ou-Niang and parents to make a name for himself. He becomes a notable magistrate, but when he marries Princess Nieou-Chi, he is forbidden by her father to contact his family. His impoverished parents die of starvation during a famine, and Tchao-Ou-Niang is forced to sell her hair to pay for their funeral. She ultimately is reunited with her husband by Nieou-Chi, and is welcomed to the palace as his #1 wife.

Unlike the original work, Tsai-Yong has to decide between love and filial piety. Ultimately Tsai-Yong and Tchao-Ou-Niang are united.

== Production ==
The Broadway production was directed by John Houseman and was produced by Michael Meyerberg. It opened at the Plymouth Theatre on February 6, 1946, and closed on June 8 of the same year after running for 142 performances. Scenic, costume, and lighting design were by Robert Edmond Jones.

The cast included Yul Brynner as Tsai-Yong, Mary Martin as Tchao-Ou-Niang, Mildred Dunnock and Augustin Duncan as the parents, and Helen Craig as Nieou-Chi. Appearing as Si-Tchun, a Lady-in-Waiting, was Nancy Davis, making her first and only Broadway appearance.

A London production opened at the Winter Garden on October 11, 1948, produced by Albert de Courville and starring Brynner and Dolly Haas.

One factor in the change to the ending was the efforts of Mary Martin and her husband Richard Halliday, who acted as her manager, because of the belief that "'sharing a man was unworthy of a star of Mary's magnitude'".

== Song list ==
Act 1

- Mountain High, Valley Low ..... Tchao-Ou-Niang and Tsai-Yong
- Monkey See, Monkey Do ..... Tchao-Ou-Niang
- Where You Are ..... Tchao-Ou-Niang

Act 2

- Willow Tree ..... Tsai-Yong
- Vision Song ..... Tchao-Ou-Niang and Tsai-Yong
- Bitter Harvest ..... Tchao-Ou-Niang

Act 3

- Mountain High, Valley Low (Reprise) ..... Tchao-Ou-Niang
- Lute Song ..... Tchao-Ou-Niang

Decca Records released an album containing six tracks – four vocals by Martin and two instrumentals – on three 78 RPM records.

== Critical reception ==
Time called it "the season's loveliest production and most charming failure [that] never quite catches the inner glow of art or the outward stir of theater." It continued, "There should have been either less spectacle or less story. As it is, the old tale is retold at considerable length, but loses much of its flow and human feeling through gorgeous interruptions and sumptuous distractions. What's more, neither the writing nor the acting has quite the stylized quality it reaches after."
