= Bazin (surname) =

Bazin is a French surname of Germanic origin (from badhuo = battle). Notable people with the surname include:

- Anaïs Raucou (1797–1850), called Bazin, a French writer
- André Bazin (1918–1958), French film critic and film theorist
- Antoine Bazin (1799–1863), French sinologist
- Charles-Louis Bazin (1802–1859), French painter, sculptor, engraver and lithographer
- Claude Bazin de Bezons (1617–1684), French lawyer, politician, and second holder of l'Académie française, seat 1
- François Bazin (composer) (1816–1878), French opera composer
- François Bazin (sculptor) (1897–1956), French sculptor
- François Xavier Bazin (1824–1865), French archetier and bow maker, patriarch of the Bazin family
- Germain Bazin (1901–1990), French art historian
- Henri-Émile Bazin (1829–1917), French engineer
- Hervé Bazin (1911–1996), French novelist
- Janine Bazin (1923–2003), French film and television producer
- Jean Bazin (1940–2019), Canadian lawyer and former senator
- John Stephen Bazin (1796–1848), American bishop and longtime president of Spring Hill College
- Louis Bazin (1920–2011), French orientalist
- Marc Bazin (1932–2010), Haitian Minister of Finance and Economy, World Bank official and Interim President of Haiti
- Pierre-Antoine-Ernest Bazin (1807–1878), French physician and dermatologist, brother of Antoine Bazin
- René Bazin (1853–1932), French novelist, great-uncle of Hervé Bazin
- Thibault Bazin (born 1984), French politician

== See also ==
- Bazin family, French bow makers
