= Bazin =

Bazin may refer to

== Places ==
- Bazin, Zanjan, a village in Iran
- Gazan Bazin, Hormozgan, a village in Iran
- Kingdom of Bazin, a medieval Beja polity
- Bazin, Hungarian name of Pezinok, in Slovakia

== Other ==
- Bazin (surname)
- Bazin (bread) common in Libya
