= Nanxi (theatre) =

- Traditional Chinese: 南戲
- Simplified Chinese: 南戏
- Literal meaning: Southern drama
Transcriptions
Standard Mandarin
- Hanyu Pinyin: Nánxì
- Wade–Giles: Nan^{2}-hsi^{4}

Nanxi (南戲) or xiwen (戲文) was an early form of Chinese opera, developed from ancient traditions of mime, singing, and dancing during the Song dynasty in the 12th century. The name means literally "southern drama", and the form originated in the area around Wenzhou in southeastern China. Nanxi is an abbreviation of nanqu xiwen (南曲戲文, "Southern music theatre text") or nan xiwen. Nanxi is one of the earliest forms of recorded traditional Chinese Opera in the history of China.

Nanxi started as combinations of Song dynasty plays and local folk songs and ballads, using colloquial language with many scenes. Due to its coarse language, rough prosody, and unsophisticated literary style, Nanxi was considered a low art form during the Song and Yuan dynasties. However, its status was elevated with Tale of the Pipa written by Gao Ming, a play of better literary quality and more complex structure. It was highly regarded by the Ming Hongwu Emperor. By the middle of the Ming dynasty, Nanxi had developed into a more complex dramatic form known as chuanqi, of which is kunqu is a branch.

== History ==
After the establishment of Nanxi in the Wenzhou region in the 12th century, Nanxi soon after started to spread its influence all across China as the most mature form of Chinese opera of its time. Nanxi gradually transcended into its later form chuanqi, and remained its influence and became one of the major forms of drama in Ming Dynasty. At the time in Ming Dynasty, the original form of Nanxi sung in Wenzhounese lost its influence because of its universality and evolved into 4 different forms that were sung in four different tones(melodies). However, some scholars today argue that Nanxi in Ming Dynasty were sung in five different tones (melodies). The original Nanxi gave births to four different forms of itself in Ming Dynasty: Haiyan Tone (海盐腔), Yuyao Tone (余姚腔), Kunshan Tone (昆山腔), and Yiyang Tone (弋阳腔). Among the four forms, the most popular one today is known as the Kun Opera that evolved from the Kunshan Tone of Nanxi in Ming Dynasty. Kun Opera is listed as one of the Masterpieces of the Oral and Intangible Heritage of Humanity by UNESCO since 2001.

== Performance ==
In Nanxi opera, as with western operetta, spoken passages alternated with verses (qu 曲) set to popular music. Professional companies of actors performed nanxi in theatres that could hold thousands of spectators. Nanxi had seven role types, many of which were seen in later Chinese opera forms. Sheng were heroic male characters and dan heroines. The other role types Mo (末), jing, chou, wai (外), and hou (后, also called tie 貼) were less defined roles, and actors in these role types portrayed a variety of characters in the same play. The role types of later forms of Chinese opera were more strictly defined, but can be seen to have their roots in nanxi.

=== Roles ===
On the stage setting of a Nanxi performance, there are generally seven standard roles, termed sheng 生 (male lead), dan 旦 (female lead), chou 醜 (clown), jing 淨 (painted face), mo 末 (middle-aged male role), wai 外 (old male role), and tie 貼 (female second lead). The main plot develops around the characters in the sheng 生 and dan 旦 roles, complemented usually by chou 醜, jing 淨, and mo 末. This stage setting system of Nanxi invented in Wenzhou with seven standard roles is the earliest complete role system in the history of Chinese opera.

== Works ==
Nanxi was considered a low art form and thus ignored in much contemporary historiography, and it was almost forgotten by scholars after the mid-16th century. Of the large numbers of nanxi originally written, only 283 titles and 20 play texts survive. Complete scripts of three works were found in the 1920s, the earliest of which is a work from the Southern Song, The No. 1 Scholar Zhang Xie (張協狀元). The story tells of Zhang Xie, who on the way to the capital to take the imperial examination, is robbed and injured by bandits. He is nursed back to health by a local maiden, whom he marries. She then pays for him to continue to the capital to take the examination, in which he wins first place. However, when his wife tries to meet him in the capital, he rejects her for her lowly origins, and later tries to kill her and she is gravely injured falling off a cliff. She is saved by the Prime Minister who happens to pass by, and adopts her as his daughter. Later Zhang asks the Prime Minister to marry his daughter, and on the wedding night, finds that she is the wife he tried to kill.

Most Nanxi works from before the end of Yuan dynasty were produced by anonymous authors. The first major work with a known author is Tale of the Pipa by Gao Ming. The play tells the story of an abandoned wife who set off on a 12-year journey to find her husband, surviving by playing the pipa. The play became a model for Ming dynasty drama as it was the favorite opera of the first Ming emperor.

Other notable Nanxi plays following the Tale of the Pipa include The Thorn Hairpin (荊釵記), The White Rabbit (白兔記), The Moon Pavilion (拜月亭), and Killing Dog (殺狗記). These five plays are collectively known as the "Five Legends" (五大傳奇). Some of the missing plays such as Liu Wenlong and the Water Chestnut Mirror have been preserved in other languages.

=== Tale of the Pipa ===
Tale of the Pipa (or Tale of Lute) created by local Wenzhounese Gao Ming is a work of Nanxi that represents its highest quality and essence in its highest peak of influence in mid-Yuan Dynasty.

It is called the connecting bridge of the time of Nanxi and the time of chuanqi. The creation of Tale of the Pipa is among the greatest achievements of Chinese Opera and has had an enormous impact on composition of traditional Chinese opera, and therefore, it has even been called as the "Ancestor of all Plays" in China. In the 19th century, Tale of the Pipa was translated into English, French, German and Latin. Ever since it was published in modern era, the Lute Song has been significant in the history of Western appreciation of Chinese literature.

The first translation of Lute Song was published in 1841 in Paris by Imprimerie Royale, written by Antoine (A. P. L.) Bazin titled Le Pi-pa-ki ou l'Histoire de Luth, making the history of the first chuanqi play published in a Western language In 1946, American musical comedy based on Tale of the Pipa, titled Lute Song written by Will Irwin, Sidney Howard and starred Yul Brenner and Mary Martin, was produced on Broadway.

=== The Four Great Southern Dramas ===
The Four Great Southern Dramas (四大南戲) were four landmark works of nanxi (Southern drama) from late Yuan and early Ming China. They include The Thorn Hairpin, The White Rabbit, The Moon Pavilion, and Killing Dog. These works focus largely on family ethics and everyday life, often with poignant and moving themes, and they exerted a profound influence on the later development of Chinese drama. They were included by the Ming‑dynasty drama theorist Xu Wei (徐渭) in "A Record of Southern Ci: Old Pieces from the Song and Yuan” (南詞敘錄) section of his Record of Southern Lyrics, marking the maturation of nanxi from folk performance into the more literary form known as chuanqi. Originating mainly from Wenzhou, these plays blended folk songs, dances, and local melodies. Their plots are intricate, their style mixes colloquial and literary elements, and they were later adapted in various regions, giving rise to versions with distinct local characteristics.

==== The Thorn Hairpin ====
This tale follows the love between Wang Shipeng (王十朋) and Qian Yulian (錢玉蓮), whose engagement token is a thorn hairpin, giving the play its name. After their marriage, Wang travels to take the imperial examinations and becomes the top scholar, but is demoted for refusing to flatter corrupt officials. Yulian is coerced into remarriage and throws herself into a river, but the couple is eventually reunited.

==== The White Rabbit ====
This drama tells the love story of Liu Zhiyuan (劉知遠) and Li Sanniang (李三娘). Abused by her brother and sister‑in‑law, Li Sanniang raises her infant son alone, biting her navel to feed him in hardship. After eighteen years of waiting, she is finally reunited with Liu Zhiyuan, who has become a military commander. The title comes from the episode in which the child encounters a white rabbit.

==== The Moon Pavilion ====
Adapted from a zaju play by Guan Hanqing, it recounts how Jiang Shilong (蔣世隆) and Wang Ruilan (王瑞蘭) meet and fall in love during the Mongol invasion. They express their longing through the Moon‑Worshipping Pavilion, and after many trials, they are finally brought together again with the help of their families.

==== Killing Dog ====
This is a domestic‑ethics drama about the brothers Sun Rong (孫榮) and Sun Hua (孫華). Sun Hua is gullible and befriends the wrong people. To warn him, Sun Rong’s wife, Jie Xie (解氏), stages a ruse by pretending to kill a dog to shock him into realizing the truth. Her plan succeeds, and Sun Hua reforms.

== Notable performers ==
In his 1355 work Qinglouji, Xia Tingzhi recorded his personal recollections of many zaju and nanxi performers, including Furongxiu.

Tale of the Pipa was the only Broadway appearance of then-future First Lady of the United States Nancy Reagan. In the play of Lute Song, Reagan "dyed her brown hair black and slanted her eyes like a real oriental girl", and the show's producer told her, "You look like you could be Chinese". Like all the other nanxi plays written by local Wenzhounese artists majorly in the original language of Wenzhounese, the Lute Song is known for its complex linguistic demands which has caused international scholars to mainly focus on the shorter, and more accessible version as to their own concepts of the opera.

== Sources ==
- Encyclopædia Britannica 2006. Encyclopædia Britannica Premium Service. 19 January 2006 nanxi
- Cultures & Literatures of Asia — Cora Agatucci
