= Tale of the Pipa =

Chinese drama by Gao Ming

Tale of the Pipa (traditional Chinese: 琵琶記; simplified Chinese: 琵琶记; pinyin: Pípa jì; Wade–Giles: P'i-p'a chi "Tale of the Pipa" or "The Story of the Lute") is a Chinese nanxi play written by the playwright Gao Ming during the late Yuan dynasty. There are French, German, English translations of the play, and an English novelization-translation.

It was the most popular drama during the Ming dynasty, and it became a model for Ming drama as it was the favorite opera of the first Ming emperor Zhu Yuanzhang.

The play is set during the Han dynasty. Based on an older play, Zhao Zhen nü and Cai Erlang (趙貞女蔡二郎), also known as Zhao zhen nü (趙貞女, The Chaste Maiden Zhao), it tells the story of a loyal wife named Zhao Wuniang (趙五孃; 赵五娘; Zhào Wǔniáng; Chao^{4} Wu^{3}-niang^{2}) who, left destitute when her husband Cai Yong is forced to marry another woman, undertakes a 12-year search for him. During her journey, she plays the pipa of the play's title in order to make a living. The original story sees Zhao killed by a horse and Cai struck by lightning, however in Gao Ming's version the two are eventually reconciled and live out their lives happily. Gao reportedly composed The Lute over a three-year period of solitary confinement, locking himself in an attic room and wearing down the floorboards by tapping out the rhythms of his songs.

== Key differences between the versions ==
During the Song dynasty, the nanxi play Zhao Zhen nü and Cai Erlang portrays Cai Bojie as a cold‑hearted and unfeeling man who abandons his parents and his wife in pursuit of fame and official rank, and is ultimately struck dead by heavenly thunder. In contrast, Gao Ming’s Yuan‑dynasty adaptation The Tale of the Pipa completely overturns this characterization, recasting Cai Bojie as a tragic figure caught between the competing demands of filial piety and loyalty to the state. The play concludes with a joyful reunion and the family receiving commendation from the imperial court.

== Plot ==
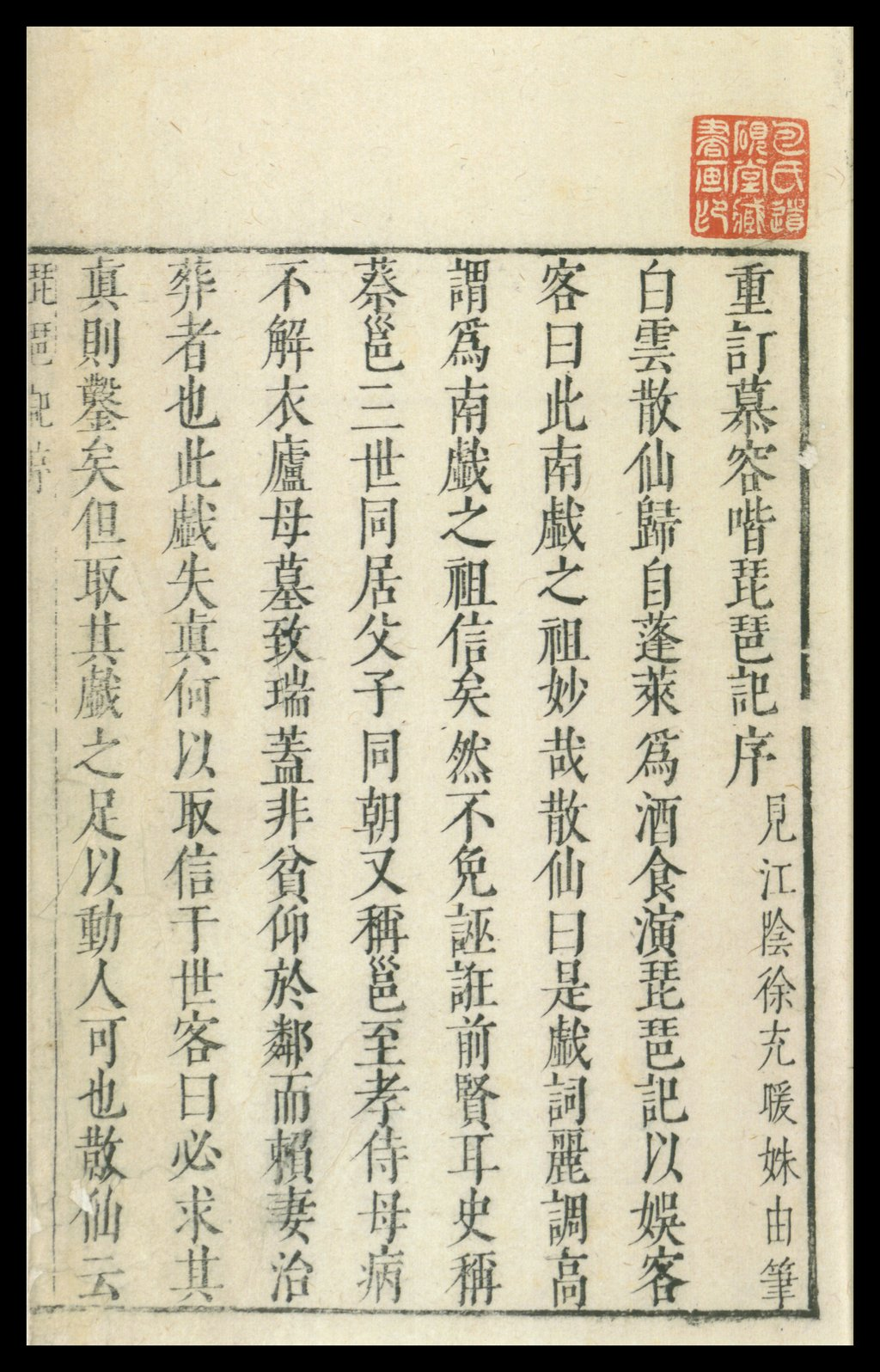
Gao Ming, circa 1305-1359

The Tale of the Pipa recounts a series of family tragedies and social conflicts arising from the scholar Cai Bojie’s (蔡伯喈) departure from his parents and wife during the Eastern Han period to sit for the metropolitan examinations — a journey that ultimately leads to his achieving high honors and bringing glory to his lineage.

Soon after, the imperial court issues a proclamation recruiting talent. The local authorities recommend Cai Bojie. Bojie firmly refuses on the grounds that his aging parents cannot be left unattended. His mother, fearing the loss of her only support, also opposes the trip. His father, however, insists that this is a rare chance to bring distinction to the family and forces him to go. Their neighbor Zhang Guangcai (張廣才) strongly supports the decision and promises to look after the household. With no alternative, Bojie prepares for the journey to the capital.

Bojie places first in the examinations, becoming the top scholar (狀元, also translated as zhuangyuan) and is appointed Yilang (議郎, lit. Consultant Gentleman). The Grand Councillor Niu (牛丞相) receives an imperial order to take Bojie as his son‑in‑law. Bojie refuses, citing his wife at home and his elderly parents, and prepares to submit a memorial requesting resignation. Enraged, Councillor Niu reports the matter to the throne, and the emperor issues a decree forbidding Bojie from resigning either his post or the marriage. Forced to remain in the Niu residence, Bojie is unable to contact his family for three years and eventually marries the councillor’s daughter.

Meanwhile, after Bojie’s departure, Zhao Wuniang (趙五娘) devotes herself wholeheartedly to serving her parents‑in‑law. Their home region of Chenliu (陳留) suffers years of drought and famine, plunging the Cai household into hardship. Bojie’s mother blames his father for forcing their son to take the examinations, and the couple quarrels constantly. Wuniang repeatedly mediates and sells her hairpins and jewelry to buy grain for them, secretly eating husks in the kitchen to survive — the episode dramatized in the famous scene Eating Chaff in Secret (《糟糠自厭》). When she finally obtains some relief grain, the local bully, the village headman, seizes it. Wuniang’s furtive eating arouses the parents‑in‑law’s suspicion; they believe she is hiding better food for herself. One day they burst into the kitchen, seize her bowl, and discover she has been eating chaff. Overcome with grief, Bojie’s mother dies, and his father bitterly regrets sending Bojie to the capital.

Soon after, Bojie’s father falls ill. On his deathbed, ashamed of how Wuniang has suffered, he urges her to remarry and leaves his staff to Zhang Guangcai, instructing him to beat Bojie out of the house when he returns. With no money for burial, Wuniang cuts off her hair to sell for a coffin — the scene Selling Hair for the Burial (《祝髮買葬》). She buries her father‑in‑law and builds a mound with earth wrapped in her hemp skirt — Skirt‑Wrapped Earth (裙包土). She then paints portraits of her deceased parents‑in‑law, takes up her pipa, and sets off alone for the capital, singing filial laments along the road.

In the Niu residence, Bojie plays the qin to express his sorrow, but his grief causes him to make constant mistakes. Longing for his parents and wife, he entrusts a messenger to carry a letter home, but the man is a swindler and never delivers it. On Mid‑Autumn night, Bojie and Lady Niu (牛小姐) admire the bright moon in the garden. Lady Niu is in high spirits, but Bojie is moved to tears by homesickness. Perceiving his sorrow, Lady Niu persuades her father to allow them to visit Chenliu. After much deliberation, Councillor Niu decides instead to bring Bojie’s parents and wife to the capital.

Wuniang follows the trail to the Niu residence and sings while playing her pipa. There she encounters the virtuous Lady Niu. The two women sympathize with each other and share their hearts. When Wuniang explains her story, Lady Niu realizes the disaster caused by the "three refusals" (Bojie’s refusal to abandon his parents, his refusal to abandon his wife, and his refusal to accept the forced marriage). Instead of making things difficult, Lady Niu invites Wuniang into her study and arranges for the couple to be reunited.

Under Lady Niu’s arrangement, Wuniang and Bojie meet and recount their years of suffering. Bojie laments bitterly: “My pursuit of learning has wronged me; I have wronged my parents" (文章誤我，我誤爹娘); "My pursuit of learning has wronged me; I have wronged my wife” (文章誤我，我誤妻房). Councillor Niu also repents and agrees that Bojie, Lady Niu, and Wuniang should return to Chenliu to tend the graves. Zhang Guangcai, understanding Bojie’s predicament, forgives him.

The play concludes with Councillor Niu arriving in Chenliu bearing an imperial edict honoring the Cai family, bringing the story to a grand finale in which one husband and two wives achieve a harmonious resolution.

== Influence ==
The Lute won considerable critical acclaim amongst Gao's contemporaries, since it raised the popular but somewhat rustic form of Southern folk opera (Nanxi) to a higher literary standard, and it became a model for Ming dynasty theatre. It was a favourite play of the first Ming Emperor Zhu Yuanzhang, who commanded that it be performed every day at court.

== Translations ==
Antoine (A. P. L.) Bazin wrote a French translation in 1841. This version, titled Le Pi-pa-ki ou l'Histoire de Luth, was published in Paris in 1841 by the Imprimerie Royale. A group of Chinese students in Boston performed an English-language version of the play in 1925, translated by Y.H. Ku and Liang Shih-chiu, and acted by Liang and Bing Xin among others. Vincenz Hundhausen wrote a German translation in 1930.

A complete English translation and study by Jean Mulligan appeared in 1980. It is a part of the "Translations from the Oriental Classics" set, published by Columbia University Press. There is an introduction, which has six sections: "The Play and Its Genre," "The Author," "Sources of the Play," "The Play as Literature," "On the Translation," and "Notes." The translation also has a bibliography in English and Chinese, a synopsis, a glossary, and a list of titles of songs. In the introduction Mulligan examines the concept of filial piety and argues that Cai Yong is, in the words of reviewer Anne M. Birrell, "a victim of circumstance".

Birrell stated that Mulligan did her work "courageously". Howard Goldblatt of San Francisco State University, while acknowledging the difficulties in translating older literature, stated that the Mulligan translation is "sensitive" and "good", adding that it "nicely captures the various modes and poetic forms". Ching-Hsi Perng (Chinese: 彭鏡禧; pinyin: Péng Jìngxǐ) of National Taiwan University wrote that that Mulligan demonstrated "tender, loving care" in the work, and that the final product has "general excellence". Richard E. Strassberg of University of California, Los Angeles wrote that the translation was "able".

== Adaptations ==
Memoirs of the Guitar, published in Shanghai in 1928, is an English-language novel self-described as "A Novel of Conjugal Love, Rewritten from a Chinese Classical Drama". The author was Yu Tinn-Hugh and the publisher was the China Current Weekly Publishing Company.

A 1946 American musical comedy based on the Chinese play, titled Lute Song, was written by Will Irwin and Sidney Howard. This adaptation was produced on Broadway. It starred Yul Brynner and Mary Martin. Cyril Birch, collaborator in a translation of The Peach Blossom Fan, wrote that presumably the basis of the American play was the A. P. L. Balzin French translation of the Chinese play.
