= The American Newspaper =

Critical study of journalism

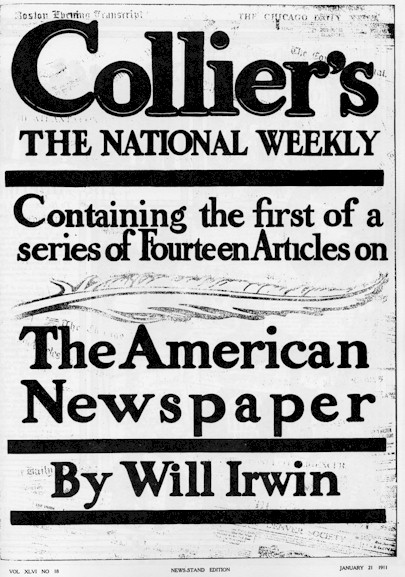
Collier's cover of the first installment.

The American Newspaper is a critical study of journalism conducted by Will Irwin from 1909 to 1910 spanning fifteen articles that discuss the origins, purposes, and principles that journalists should aspire to. The article series appeared in Collier's in serialized form in 1911.

1. “The Power of the Press” (January 21, 1911)
2. The Dim Beginnings (January 28, 1911)
3. The Fourth Current (February 18, 1911)
4. The Spread and Decline of Yellow Journalism (March 4, 1911)
5. What Is News? (March 18, 1911)
6. The Editor and the News (April 1, 1911)
7. The Reporter and the News (April 22, 1911)
8. "All the News That’s Fit to Print" (May 6, 1911)
9. The Advertising Influence (May 27, 1911)
10. The Unhealthy Alliance (June 3, 1911)
11. “Our Kind of People" (June 17, 1911)
12. The Foe from Within (July 1, 1911)
13. The New Era (July 8, 1911)
14. The Press of Two Cities (July 22, 1911)
15. The Voice of a Generation (July 29, 1911)

In his analysis, Irwin raised awareness among the public as to the corruption and moral decay of newspapers of the era. He covered both negative and positive aspects of newspaper coverage, and even attempted to define what is "news", a topic that is still debatable to this day among journalists in the field. He remarked the role of newspapers, saying that "The newspaper which has absorbed and made systematic many things that went by rule of thumb in cruder stages of society, has generally taken over this legislative power of public opinion, this executive power of gossip."

Irwin's study is still referenced today for students of journalism.

== Bibliography ==
Hudson, Robert V. Will Irwin's Pioneering Criticism of the Press (1970)
