= François Bazin =

François Bazin may refer to:

- François Bazin (composer) (1816–1878), French opera composer
- François Bazin (sculptor) (1897–1956), French sculptor
- François Xavier Bazin (1824–1865), French archetier and master bow maker
