= Margaret Foley =

American sculptor, carver and miniature painter

- Born: Margaret Foley; 1827; Vermont, US
- Died: 1877 (aged 49–50); Merano, Austria-Hungary
- Education: Self-taught
- Known for: Sculpture, cameo, medallion, portraits, and direct carving
- Notable work: Cleopatra, 1876 Marble Relief of Pasuccia, 1865 Bronze Stonewall Jackson
- Movement: Neoclassical sculpture

Margaret F. Foley (1827–1877) was an American sculptor who worked in a Neoclassical style. In addition to sculpture, she is known for cameo carving, medallion portraits, and direct carving.

== Early years ==
Foley was born in northern Vermont in 1827 and grew up in a rural area in Vergennes, Vermont. She began with whittling and carving and became a self-taught prodigy in sculpture. The daughter of a farmhand, Foley worked as a maid in order to afford her schooling, and later became a schoolteacher. At the age of fourteen, Foley traveled to Lowell, Massachusetts to work in the spinning room of the Merrimack Corporation as a mill girl.

While working at the mill, Foley began a career as a professional cameo carver in both shell and lava. She learned this trade at Ednah Dow Cheney's School of Design for Women, which opened in 1850 to provide occupational training for single women in the domestic arts. Cameo carving, like miniature painting, was considered a suitable career for women artists due to its decorative nature and association with sentimentality. Foley continued to support herself as a cameo artist throughout her career as a sculptor, and she often received accolades for her cameos when they were exhibited. She met Lorenza Haynes in Lowell, Massachusetts, and for nearly thirty years, till Foley's death, they remained friends.

== Career ==
=== Expatriate in Rome ===
In 1860, with the assistance of a Vermont politician who recognized her talent, she emigrated to Rome to study and grow her career as a sculptor. She traveled with Charlotte Cushman and Emma Stebbins, both of whom were central figures in an expatriate community of American women sculptors and intellectuals that also included Harriet Hosmer, Anne Whitney, Edmonia Lewis, Louisa Lander, Vinnie Ream, and others. At first, Foley's financial situation in Rome was difficult, but she soon found employment creating medallion portraits for prominent sitters and writing about art for the Boston Evening Transcript and the Crayon. When she first arrived in Rome, she shared a studio with Emma Stebbins, but after receiving some instruction from John Gibson, she opened a studio of her own on via Due Macelli.

As an artist from a working-class background without reliable support from wealthy patrons, Foley chose most of her subjects based on the demands of the art market. These included relief medallions, fancy pieces, and cameos, all of which appealed to American and British tourists visiting her studio as part of the Grand Tour. Like many of the other American women sculptors working in Rome, Foley carved her own marbles to keep costs down and to ensure complete artistic control of the end result. Within this circle, only Harriet Hosmer was successful enough to require the employment of studio assistants.

=== Works ===
In Rome, Foley began to sculpt large marble medallion portraits—for example, a portrait it of the poet William Cullen Bryant—as well as portrait busts in the round, such as the 1877 bust of the Transcendentalist minister Theodore Parker. One of her most well-known medallions, created in 1866, depicted Pascuccia, a model from Naples renowned for her beauty. With a Christian cross at her neck and Semitic features, Pascuccia embodied the polyglot world of nineteenth-century Rome, and Foley sold at least four versions of the sculpture.

Foley also sculpted biblical and historical subjects such as Jeremiah and Cleopatra, both of which were exhibited at the main Memorial Hall of the 1876 Philadelphia Centennial Exposition. Foley also exhibited a large fountain at the Exposition's Horticultural Hall, consisting of three children supporting a marble basin adorned with acanthus leaves (now in the Fairmount Park Horticultural Center in Philadelphia, Pennsylvania). Over the course of her career, she gained many commissions and praise for her "crisply delineated, noble style".

== Death ==
Beginning in the 1870s, Foley's health began to fail as she suffered from a debilitating neurological illness that prevented her from carving her own marbles directly. In 1877, she traveled with her British author friends, the Howitts, to Tyrol. She died of a stroke in Meran, Austria, on December 7, 1877, and was the only American woman sculptor to die at such a young age while residing in Europe.

== List of known works ==
- Abolitionist, 1860
- Mrs. William Greenleaf Eliot, marble relief, 1864
- Marble Relief of Pascuccia, 1865
- William Cullen Bryant, 1867
- Portrait of Mr. and Mrs. E. H. R. Lyman, 1868
- Group of the Infant Bacchus with a Kid, 1871
- Portrait Relief in Profile, 1874
- Fountain, 1874-1876
- Mary Howitt, 1875
- Cleopatra, 1876
- Bust of Theodore Parker, 1877
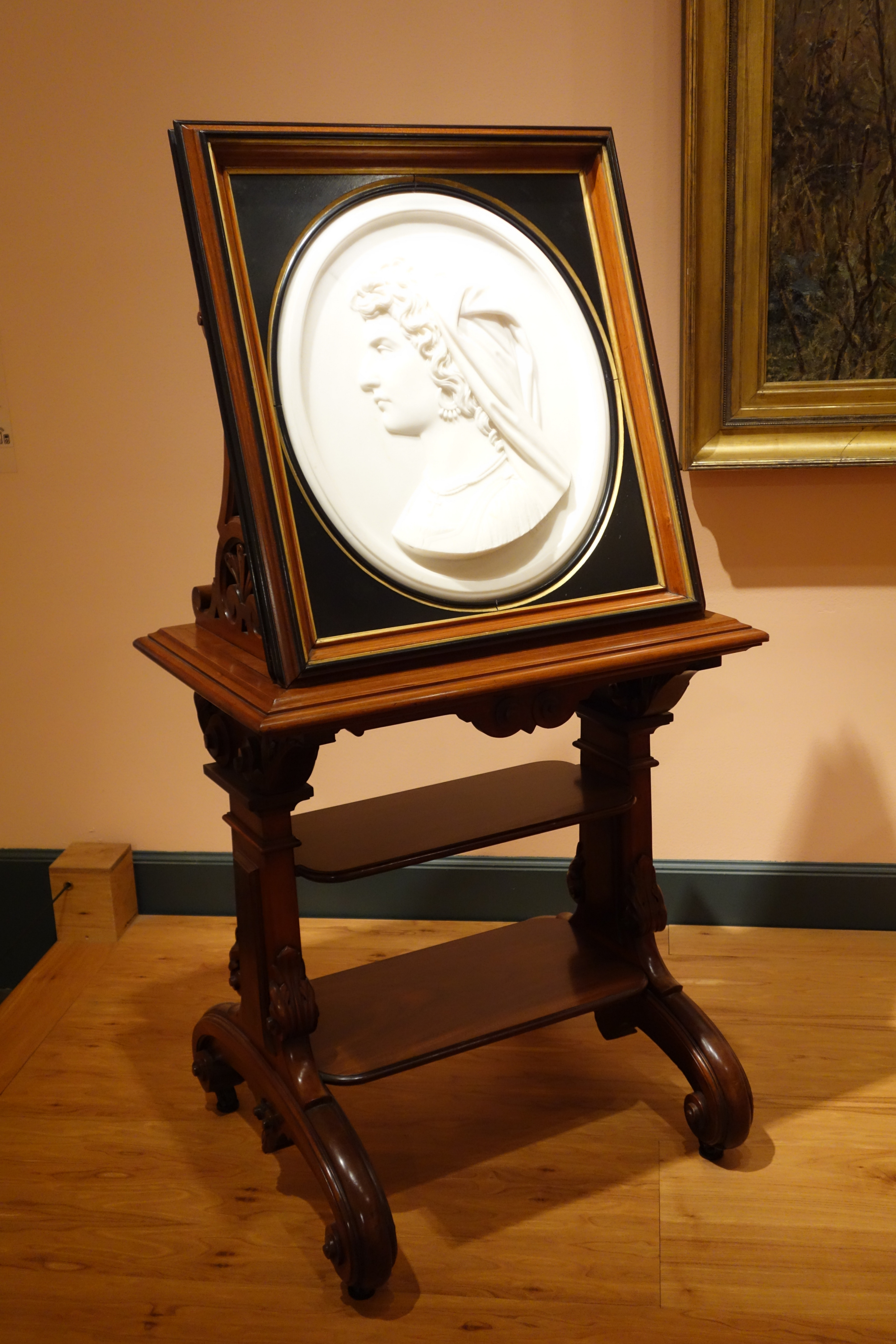
Marble relief of Pascuccia (1865), Brooklyn Museum

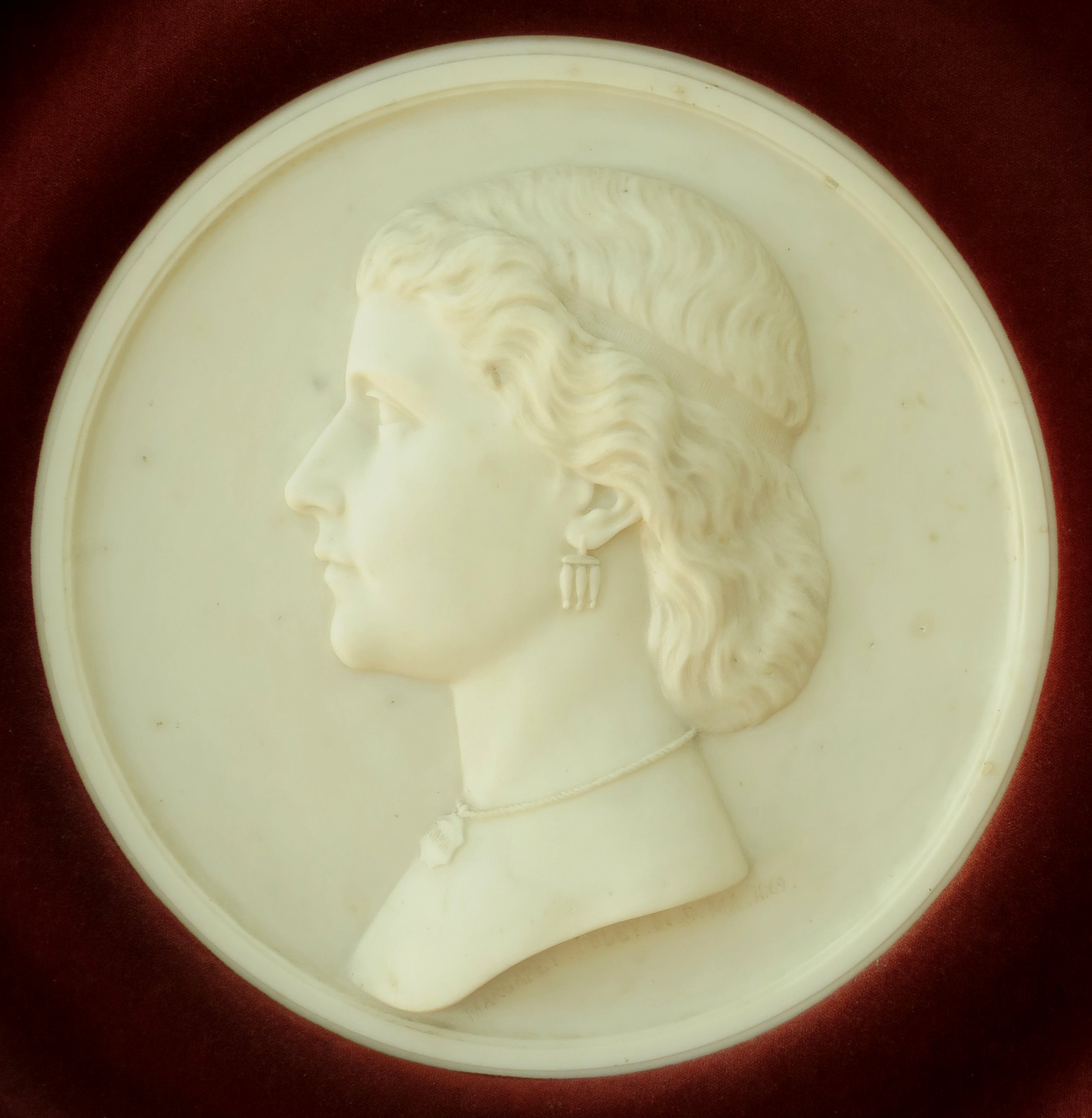
Jenny Lind (1869), High Museum of Art

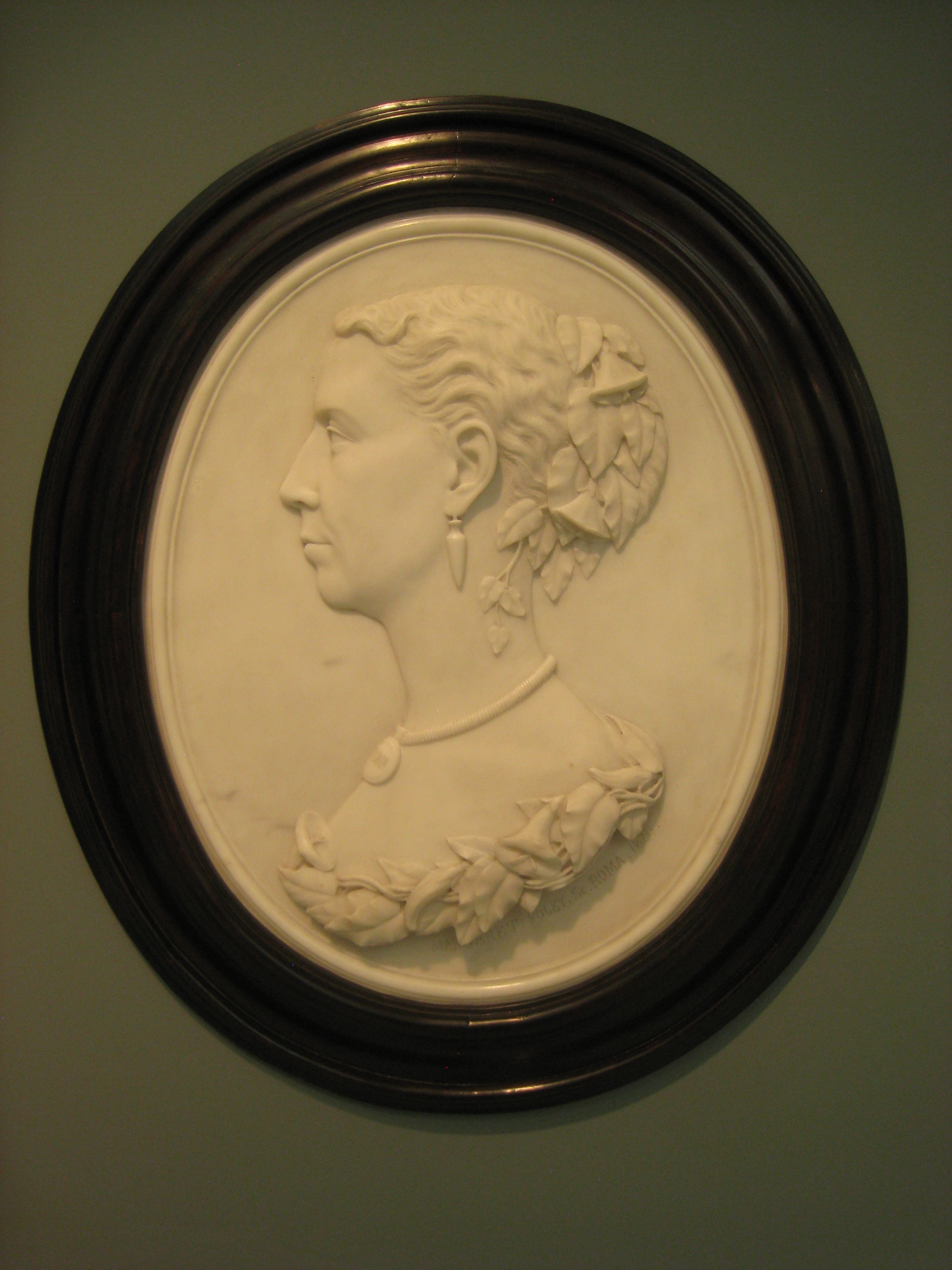
Mrs. Cleveland (1870), Carnegie Museum of Art

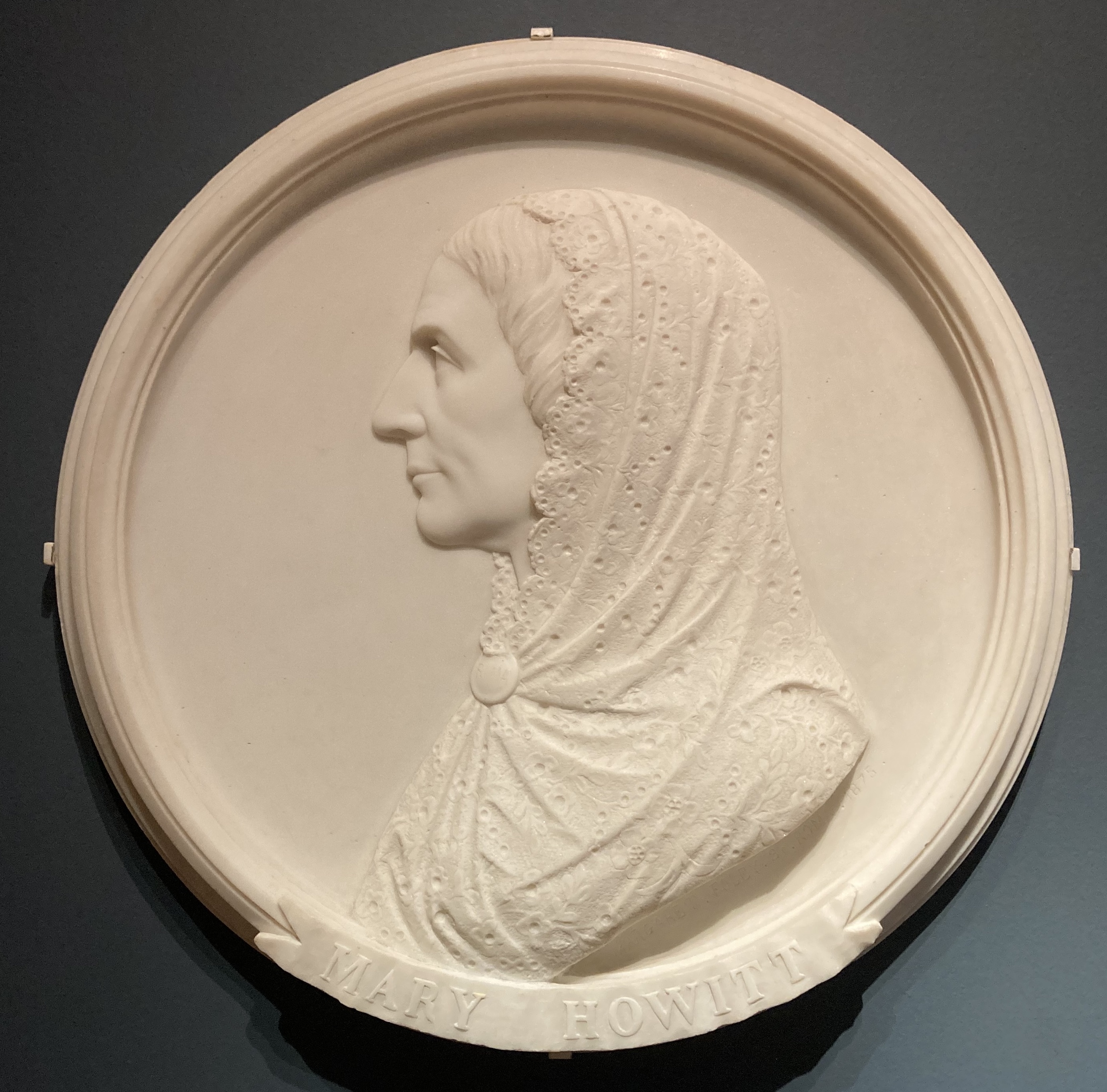
Mary Howitt (1875), Chrysler Museum of Art

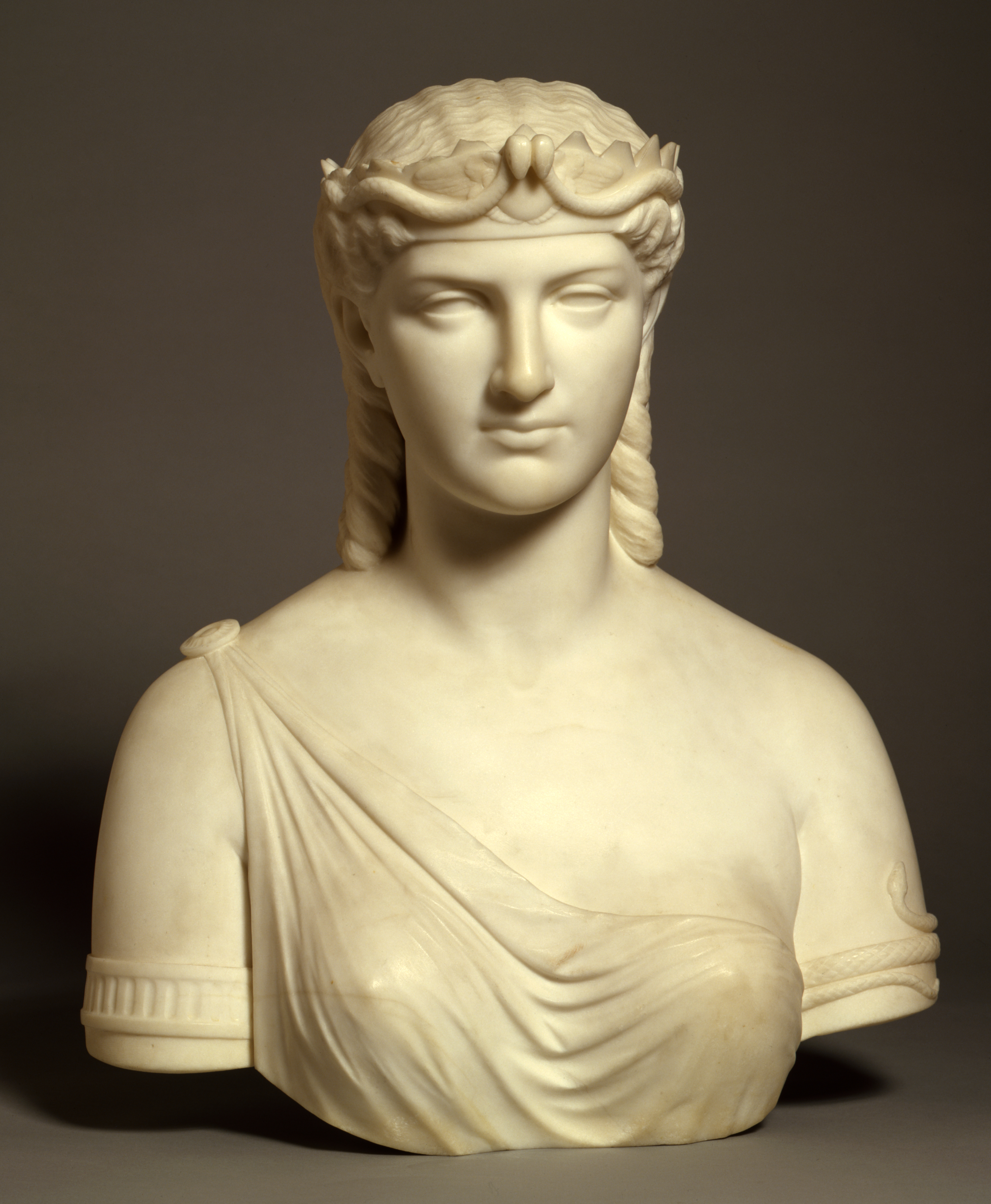
Cleopatra (1876), Smithsonian American Art Museum
