= Bernie Hanighen =

American songwriter and record producer

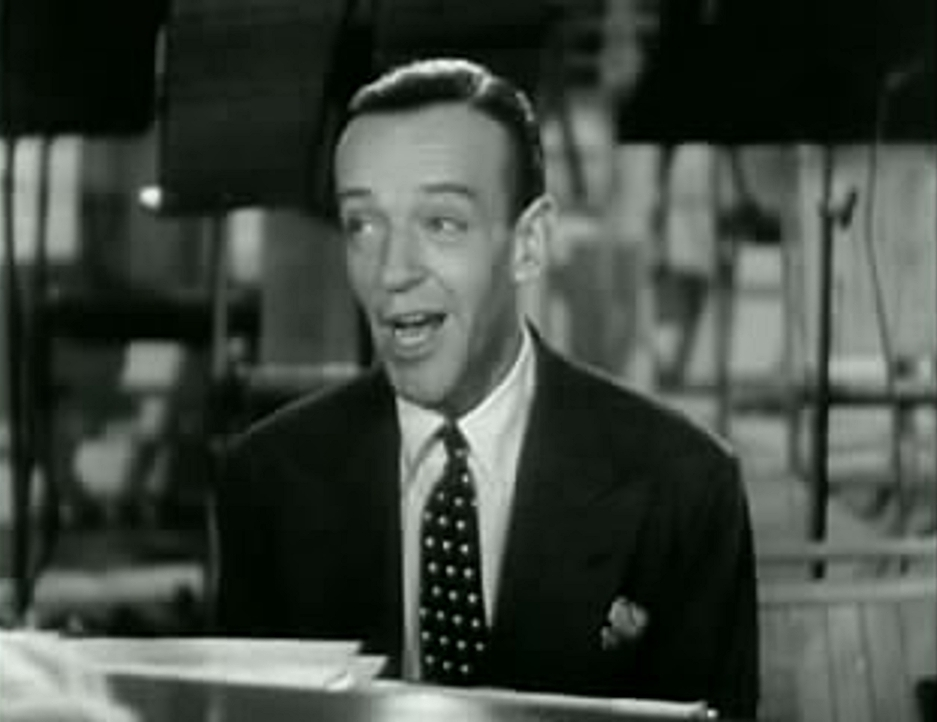
Fred Astaire singing Hanighen and Mercer's "Poor Mr. Chisholm" in Second Chorus (1940)

Bernard D. Hanighen (April 27, 1908 in Omaha, Nebraska – October 19, 1976 in New York City, New York) was an American songwriter and record producer, best known for "When a Woman Loves a Man", and writing lyrics to the jazz composition "'Round Midnight", composed by jazz musician Thelonious Monk. Hanighen also worked with Clarence Williams and Johnny Mercer.

== Songwriting career ==
Hanighen composed lyrics for the 1946 Broadway musical Lute Song, which starred Mary Martin and Yul Brynner, and which featured music by Raymond Scott.

Bernie Hanighen and Cootie Williams collaborated to transform Thelonious Monk's bop masterpiece "'Round Midnight", creating what became a standard in the vocal canon thanks to performances by Mel Tormé, Ella Fitzgerald, Sarah Vaughan, Carmen McRae, Nancy Wilson, Chris Connor, and Julie London.

Hanighen was one of the writers for the Sing It Again program on CBS Radio.

== Producing Billie Holiday ==
From 1936 to 1939, Hanighen co-produced Billie Holiday's early Columbia recordings with John Hammond. He and Holiday remained close friends. She wrote in her 1956 autobiography, Lady Sings the Blues:

Bernie almost lost his job at Columbia fighting for me. A lot of guys were big tippers uptown, but when it came to fighting for you downtown, they were nowhere. Not Bernie. He was the cause of me making my first records under my own name - not as anybody's damn vocalist, but Billie Holiday period, and then the list of musicians backing me. Bernie Hanighen is a great guy.
