= The Dramatic Imagination =

1941 book by Robert Edmond Jones

The Dramatic Imagination: Reflections and Speculations on the Art of the Theatre
- Author: Robert Edmond Jones
- Subject: Scenic Design
- Genre: Performing Arts
- Publisher: Duell, Sloan and Pearce
- Publication date: 1941
- Media type: Paperback
- Pages: 157
- ISBN: 9780878305926

The Dramatic Imagination is a book written in 1941 by American scenic designer Robert Edmond Jones.

It is considered the basic blueprint from which all innovations of modern stage design have been crafted.
