= Vincenz Hundhausen =

Vincenz Maria Hermann Hundhausen (15 December 1878 – 18 May 1955) was a German national, who was also a German-language professor at Peking University and a translator of Chinese works into German. He used the Chinese name Hong Taosheng (traditional Chinese: 洪濤生; simplified Chinese: 洪涛生; pinyin: Hóng Tāoshēng; Wade–Giles: Hung^{2} T'ao^{1}-sheng^{1}).

Hundhausen owned the Poplar Island Press, based out of his Beijing house. In addition, Hundhausen saw himself as a poet and an artist.

In 2001 Annette Merker, author of a book review of Vincenz Hundhausen (1878-1955): Leben und Werk des Dichters, Druckers, Verlegers, Professors, Regisseurs und Anwalts in Peking, wrote that he was "little known by non-sinologists".

== Life ==
Hundhausen was born in Grevenbroich on 15 December 1878. His father, V. Hundhausen, was a factory owner. V. Hundhausen's grandfather, Vinzenz Jakob von Zuccalmaglio, was a friend of Ernst Moritz Arndt.

Hundhausen studied law in the cities of Bonn, Berlin, Freiburg, and Munich. In 1909 in Berlin Hundhausen began practicing law and working as a notary. During World War I Hundhausen initially served as an officer. He became a prosecutor serving in Eastern Europe for the Commander-in-Chief of the East.

By the year 1923, Hundhausen had become a specialist in property administration and guardianship. In 1923, Hundhausen was the executor of the Pape-assets in Tianjin and he had been asked to settle an inheritance case there. He stated that he had a lack of knowledge and awareness of China when he traveled there at age 45. Hundhausen stayed in China, living and working there for 31 years, with one short interruption. In 1946 Hundhausen stated that after he first arrived in China he decided to stay there because he foresaw political developments that would occur in Germany. He worked for the State University of Peking as a professor of German literature. From 1924 to 1937 he taught "German and World Literature" at the university.

In China he also became a publisher-printer, a poet, and a translator. In western Beijing he lived in an estate called "Poplar Island" (Pappelinsel), located west of the former Beijing city wall, near the former wall's southwestern corner. It was his base for printing, publishing, translating, and writing of poetry. His business was called the Poplar Island Press (German: Pappelinsel-Verlag or German: Pappelinsel-Werkstatt, traditional Chinese: 楊樹島; simplified Chinese: 杨树岛; pinyin: Yángshù dǎo; Wade–Giles: Yang^{2}-shu^{4} tao^{3}) In the late 1930s about 40 employees worked for the business in the house's courtyards.

In 1926 he sent letters to the Parliament of Germany urging the country to not join the Nine Power Treaty. He wrote that his letters were successful in "preventing Germany at the very last moment from joining to the Nine Power Treaty, already passed by the legislative body, which was to be repeatedly abused to China's detriment". After the institutionalized German community was founded in 1935, he refused to join it. He resigned from the Zhong de Xuehui (中德學會; 中德学会,; Zhōng Dé Xuéhuì; Chung^{1} De^{2} Hsüeh^{2}-hui^{4}), the German government's "German Institute" located in China. The Nazis forced him to leave his university position in 1937. The German Ambassador to China commented on Hundhausen's expulsion from his position by stating "only such teaching staff are required as are better able to serve the new political era in Germany." That year, Hundhausen took control of Peking University's printing press, keeping it away from the control of the invading Japanese. He used it to increase his printing business. He said that several hundred cultural works had been produced with it.

In 1954 the Chinese government expelled him, and he was deported to Germany. Annette Merker wrote that "Hundhausen's isolation in China during the war years, his intellectual isolation from Germany, and not least the violent political upheavals in China, which caused him, unlike other Germans, to be expelled from that country, prevented him from making a new start in Germany." He died in Grevenbroich in 1955.

== Translations and publications ==
Odes of Horace was Hundhausen's first translation. Hundhausen had completed translation work done by Christoph Martin Wieland, who had done his own translation of the Odes of Horace in 1872 and that of the satires in the period 1784 to 1786. Lutz Bieg, author of "Literary translations of the classical lyric and drama in the first half of the 20th century: The "case" of Vincenz Hundhausen (1878-1955)", wrote that Hundhausen was "probably inspired" by Wieland, who Hundhausen had "greatly admired" and had made as "one of his German idols".

Hundhausen had translated Chinese poetry and dramas into German. During the decade of the 1920s, he translated over 120 Chinese texts, with most of them being poems. His translations began appearing after 1926. Poems translated by Hundhausen include those of Bai Juyi, Li Taibo, Su Dongpo, and Tao Yuanming. He also made German translations of philosophical tracts by Laozi and Zhuangzi.

In 1930 he wrote a German translation for Tale of the Pipa (Pipa ji). In 1937 he published a German translation of The Peony Pavilion (Mudan ting) by Tang Xianzu. He also translated Wang Shifu's The Western Chamber, as well as Tang Xianzu's The Soul's Return. Hartmut Walravens, author of "German Influence on the Press in China," wrote that Hundhausen was a "masterly translator". Bieg stated that Hundhausen had an "apparently rather limited knowledge of the (literary? classical?) Chinese language" and that he was an "amateur sinologist", his colleagues and helpers, including Feng Zhi and Xu Daolin, were "excellent". In 1946 he wrote "Mein Lebenslauf" (My life), an autobiographical work.

He had a German-language theater company, Pekinger Bühnenspiele, which performed Chinese dramas in the German language, and also created publications. In its dramas the company used Chinese and German actors and catered to mostly German audiences in Beijing. It also conducted tours in Qingdao, Tianjin, in Shanghai. The theater company and Hundhausen toured Austria and Switzerland in the northern hemisphere spring of 1936.

In addition he edited and was responsible for several sonderausgaben (Chinese: 特刊; pinyin: tèkān; Wade–Giles: t'e^{4}-k'an^{1}) special issues of the Deutsch-Chinesische Nachrichten. These issues included, on anniversaries of famous people, the famous peoples' articles, translations and texts to celebrate them. He had published festschrifts about Johann Wolfgang von Goethe, Wilhelm von Humboldt, von Platen, Friedrich Schiller, Baruch Spinoza, and Christoph Martin Wieland.

Erwin von Zach has a positive reception to Hundhausen's work. Some academics criticized Hundhausen. Erich Schmitt, a professor based in Bonn, Germany, accused Hundhausen of plagiarism.

=== List of publications ===
- Vincenz Hundhausen: Die Oden des Horaz (Odes of Horace). In deutscher Sprache. Borngräber o.J. (1925)
- Vincenz Hundhausen: Die Laute ("The Lute", Tale of the Pipa). Ein chinesisches Singspiel. In deutscher Sprache. Peking: Pekinger Verlag, 1930
- Vincenz Hundhausen: Chinesische Dichter in deutscher Sprache. Peking, Leipzig: Pekinger Verlag, Leipzig : Carl Emil Krug, 1926
- Vincenz Hundhausen: Der Ölhändler und das Freudenmädchen. Eine chinesische Geschichte in 5 Gesängen. Peking: Pekinger Verlag, (1928)
- Vincenz Hundhausen: Das Westzimmer. Ein chinesisches Singspiel aus dem dreizehnten Jahrhundert. Eisenach, 1926
- Vincenz Hundhausen: Die Weisheit des Dschuang-Dse in deutschen Lehrgedichten. Peking: Pekinger Verlag 1926
- Vincenz Hundhausen: Die Rückkehr der Seele. Ein romantisches Drama Von Tang Hsiän Dsu. 3 Bände: Traum und Tod / Die Auferstehung / Im Neuen Leben. Erich Röth-Verlag, 1937
- Vincenz Hundhausen: Chinesische Dichter ~ des dritten bis elften Jahrhunderts. Erich Röth-Verlag, 1926
- Vincenz Hundhausen: Korrespondenzen 1934–1954, Briefe an Rudolf Pannwitz 1931–1954, Abbildungen und Dokumente zu Leben und Werk. Wiesbaden: Otto Harrassowitz, 2001. ISBN 978-3-447043748
