= Lorenza Haynes =

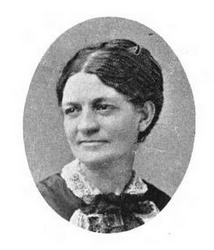
- Born: April 15, 1820; Sudbury, Middlesex County, Massachusetts
- Died: June 6, 1899 (aged 79); Waltham, Massachusetts
- Occupations: Minister, Librarian, Educator

Lorenza Haynes (April 15, 1820 – June 6, 1899) was an American librarian, minister, school founder, suffragist, and writer.

Hayne began her early career as a teacher, working at schools in Lonsdale, Rhode Island, as well as Leicester and Lowell, Massachusetts. In 1854, she opened a private school in Rochester, New York, and from 1856 through 1860, was the principal of a young women's seminary there. Ill health forced a temporary retirement of four years, after which she served six years as the first librarian of the Waltham, Massachusetts Public Library. During this period, she became intimate with the Rev. Olympia Brown and Mary A. Livermore. In 1872, after retiring from the library, she entered St. Lawrence University, Canton, New York, and before completing the course there, was called to the pastorate of the Universalist Church in Hallowell, Maine. She delivered her first sermon as pastor on July 26, 1874. While occupying this place, she officiated as chaplain in the House of Representatives and also in the Senate, in Augusta, Maine; this was the first instance of a woman acting in that capacity in that State. She also served as chaplain of the Soldier's Home at Togus. In 1876, she went to the Marlboro, Massachusetts Church, and afterward, she held pastorates in Fairfield, Maine, Skowhegan, Maine, Rockport, Massachusetts, and Pigeon Cove, Massachusetts. Haynes, Phebe Ann Coffin Hanaford, Mary H. Graves were the first Massachusetts women to become ordained Christian ministers.

== Early years and education ==
Lorenza Haynes was born in Sudbury, Massachusetts, April 15, 1820. She was the youngest of nine children (one son, eight daughters), their parents being Anna (Carr) and Sudbury, Massachusetts-born Gideon Haynes. Lorenza was a direct descendant of Walter Haynes, who came from England with his family in 1638. The next year, he bought from Cato, a Native American, for the sum of five pounds, a tract of land, now the town of Sudbury, Massachusetts. Haynes is of the seventh generation, all of whom, including her father's family were born in Sudbury. The maternal side is descended from the Scotch.

From childhood, Haynes showed an unusual interest in books, and, raised in a town which had a library and an annual course of lectures, she became a constant reader and student. Haynes passed through the grades of the public schools, and then attended the Waltham Academy of Louis Smith. She taught one of the public schools in her native town for nearly two years, but her love for studying was so strong that she went for a time to the academy in Leicester, Massachusetts.

== Career ==
=== Educator ===
After her time at the Leicester academy, she taught at a public school for six years in the city of Lowell, Massachusetts and there made the acquaintance of Margaret Foley, a cameo cutter. Thus began a friendship which continued for nearly thirty years and ended only when Foley died, she having become a prominent sculptor in Rome. Haynes afterwards held the position of lady principal at the Academy in Chester, New Hampshire. She subsequently established a young ladies' seminary in Rochester, New York. After four years, she was compelled to return to her home for some rest.

=== Librarian ===
Spending many years as an invalid, she then accepted the position of librarian at the Waltham Public Library which Waltham was to establish in the second story of the Waltham Bank Building, Having entire charge of the work of cataloging and organizing the library, she was said to have performed an incredible amount of work, for which the salary was hardly suitable. After six-and-a-half years of service, she resigned her office in order to enter the Universalist Theological school of St. Lawrence University, Canton, New York. Frequently, while librarian, she worked as a lecturer.

=== Universalist minister ===
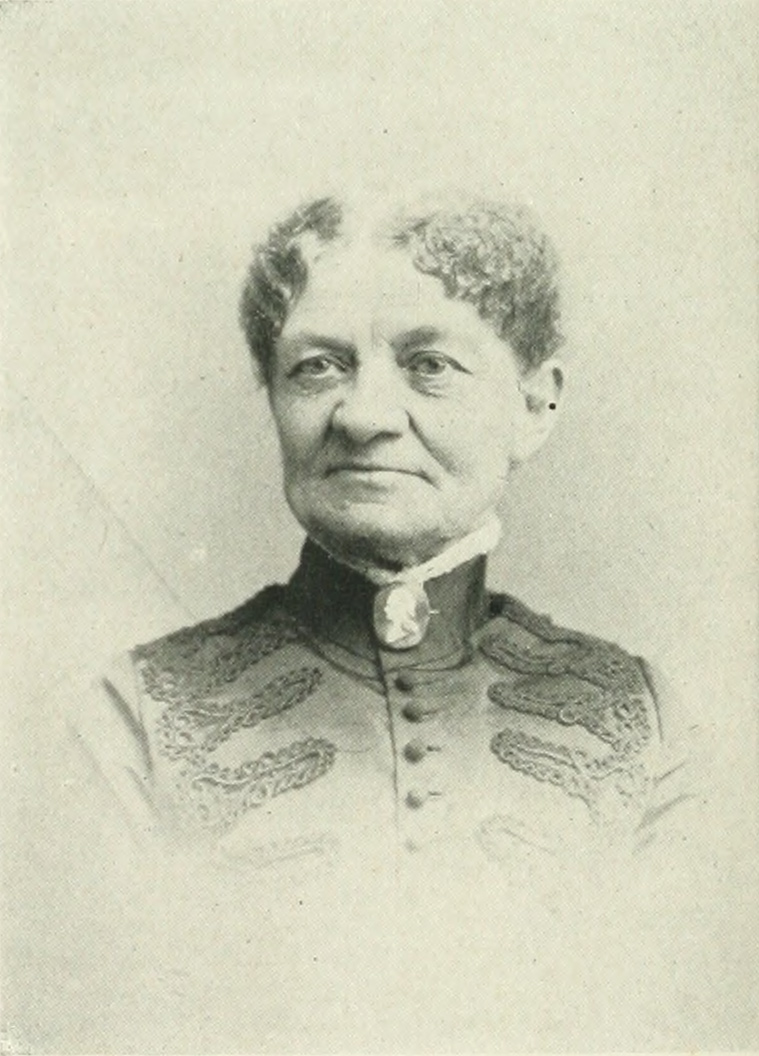
Lorenza Haynes, a "Woman of the Century"

A year before leaving the library, she read and studied under the direction of Rev. Olympia Brown, who wished her at once to take charge of a parish which was open to her; however, Haynes was not willing to take the work as she was less equipped theologically than young men graduates. In her day, she was the oldest woman who ever studied in Canton Theological School.

Two months before her course of study was finished in Canton, she received a call from the Universalist Church in Hallowell, Maine, to become its pastor when she left Canton. Though she had never preached before the society, she accepted the call, and was ordained there on February 10, 1875. She officiated as chaplain in the Maine House of Representatives and also in that state's Senate, in Augusta, Maine. This was the first instance of a woman acting in that capacity in that State. She was chaplain for two terms in the National Soldiers' Home near Augusta, the first woman who had filled that place, and had an invitation for a third term, when she resigned her pastorate in Hallowell for one in Marlborough, Massachusetts.

While preaching in the latter place, she was invited by Post 43, Grand Army of the Republic, to make some remarks in the exercises of Memorial Day, 1876. The following year, she was unanimously invited to deliver the oration of the day. It was the first time a woman in Massachusetts had filled that position. Haynes provided services over parishes in Fairfield, Maine, Rockport, Massachusetts, and Skowhegan, Maine. She often found her labors exceedingly arduous, especially during Maine winters, preaching sometimes in two or three places the same day. She rode 10–12 miles (16–19 km) in an open sleigh, with the mercury below 0 °F, to officiate at a funeral. She left her parish in Fairfield, in 1883, for a European tour. She was from its organization a member and first vice-president of the Woman's Ministerial Conference.

Haynes worked in various reformatory societies. She was always a woman suffragist. She often spoke upon platforms and before legislative committees in the State Houses of Massachusetts and Maine. For many years, she wrote for various periodicals.

== Personal life ==
In 1889, she was obliged to leave her last pastorate, which was in Skowhegan, due to overworked eyes. Having previously bought a home in Waltham, close to the family homestead, where her only surviving sister resided, she went to live there permanently in July, 1889. Gradually failing in health, she died June 6, 1899, in Waltham. Her niece, Inez Haynes Irwin, was an American feminist author, journalist, and president of the Authors Guild.
