= Pierre-Antoine-Ernest Bazin =

French physician and dermatologist

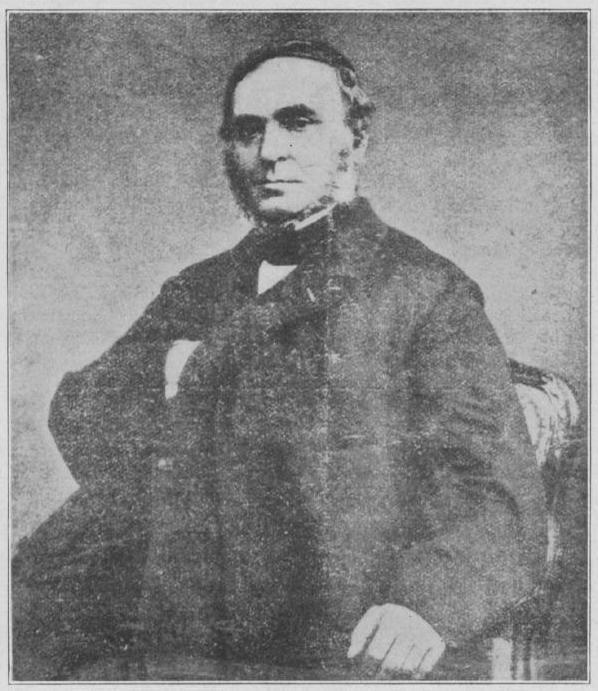
Pierre-Antoine-Ernest Bazin

Pierre-Antoine-Ernest Bazin (French pronunciation: [pjɛʁ ɑ̃twan ɛʁnɛst bazɛ̃]; 20 February 1807 – 14 December 1878) was a French physician and dermatologist born in Saint-Brice-sous-Forêt. His brother, Antoine-Pierre-Louis Bazin (1799–1863), was a noted Sinologist.

In 1828 he started work as a hospital interne, earning his doctorate from the faculty of Paris in 1834. In 1836 he became médecin des hôpitaux, later working at the Hôpital Lourcine from 1841 to 1844, followed by three years at Hôpital Saint-Antoine. In 1847 he became the departmental head at Hôpital Saint-Louis.

== Eponyms ==
- Bazin's disease: Also known as erythema induratum.
- Alibert–Bazin syndrome: Historical name for mycosis fungoides. Named with dermatologist Jean-Louis-Marc Alibert (1768–1837).

== Selected publications ==
- Recherches sur la nature et le traitement des teignes (1853); (Research on the nature and treatment of ringworm).
- Leçons théoriques et cliniques sur la scrofule, considérée en elle-même et dans ses rapports avec la syphilis, la dartre et l'arthritis. (1858); (Theoretical/clinical lessons on scrofula, etc.)
- Leçons théoriques et cliniques sur les affections cutanées parasitaires (1858); (Theoretical/clinical lessons on parasitic skin diseases).
- Leçons théoriques et cliniques sur les syphilides (1859); (Theoretical/clinical lessons on syphilids).
- Leçons théoriques et cliniques sur les affections génériques de la peau (1862); (Theoretical/clinical lessons on generic skin disorders).
