= Inez Haynes Irwin =

American feminist and writer (1873–1970)

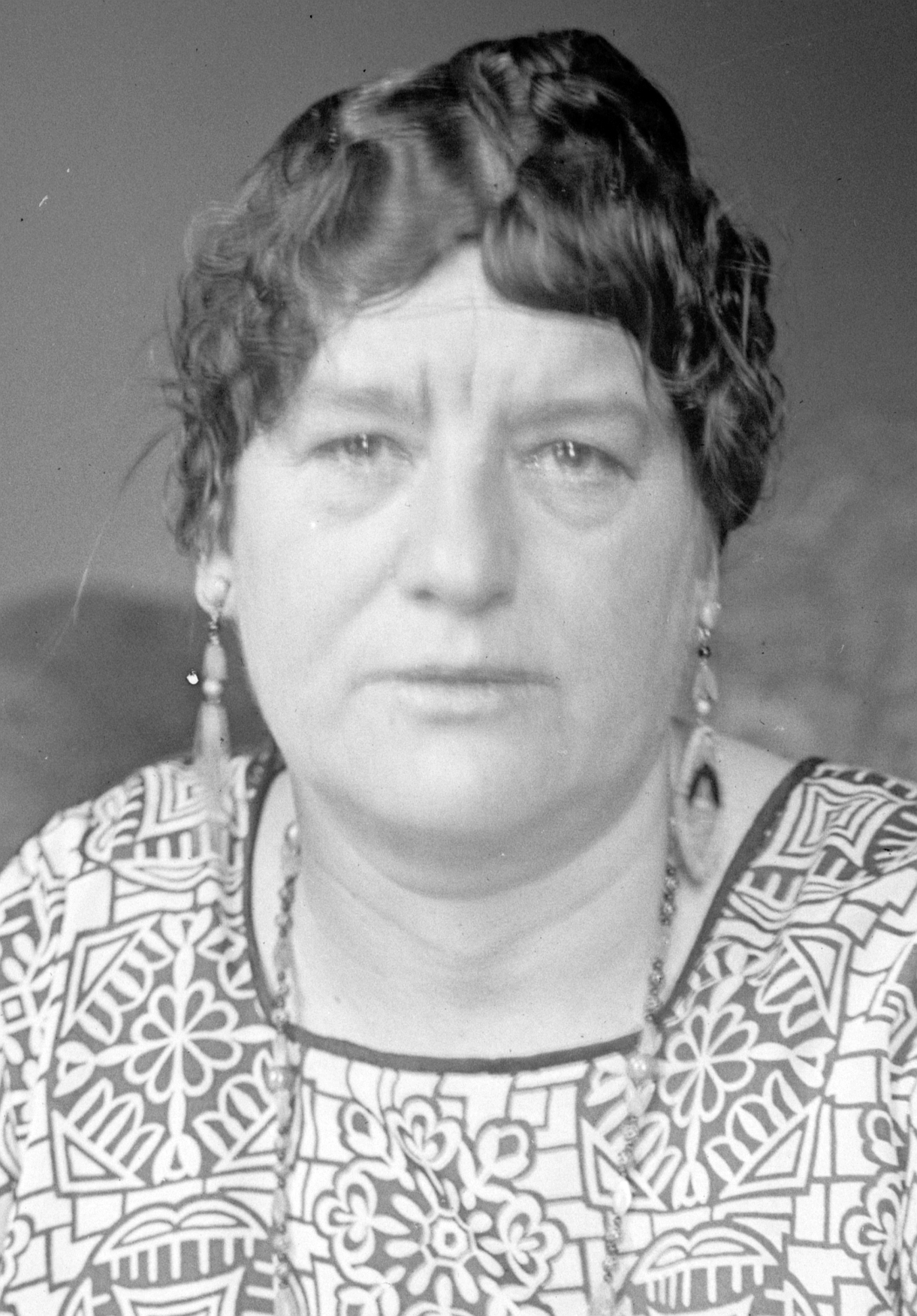
- Inez Haynes Irwin in 1923.
- Born: March 2, 1873; Rio de Janeiro, Brazil
- Died: September 25, 1970 (aged 97); Scituate, Massachusetts, United States
- Occupations: Writer, journalist, feminist
- Spouse: Will Irwin
- Relatives: Lorenza Haynes (aunt)
- Writing career
- Pen name: Inez Haynes Gillmore
- Notable awards: O. Henry Award

Inez Haynes Irwin (March 2, 1873 – September 25, 1970) was an American feminist author, journalist, member of the National Woman's Party, and president of the Authors Guild. Many of her works were published under her former name Inez Haynes Gillmore. She wrote over 40 books and was active in the suffragist movement in the early 1900s. Irwin was a "rebellious and daring woman", but referred to herself as "the most timid of created beings". She died at the age of 97.

Irwin was a close friend of the American feminist writer Mary MacLane, who included a colorful personality portrait of Irwin in her newspaper articles in Butte, Montana, in 1910.

== Early years and education ==
Inez Haynes was born on March 2, 1873, in Rio de Janeiro, Brazil, to Gideon Haynes and Emma Jane (Hopkins) Haynes. Her parents were from Boston in the United States, but were staying in Brazil because of her father's business problems. Her mother, her father's second wife, was 24 years younger than him, and had to raise a family of 17 children (10 of whom were her own).

The family returned to Boston where Inez Haynes grew up. She attended four public schools, and then Radcliffe College between 1897 and 1900. At the time Radcliffe was a "center of suffragist sentiment", and Inez Haynes and Maud Wood Park founded the College Equal Suffrage League, which later became the National College Equal Suffrage League.

== Career ==
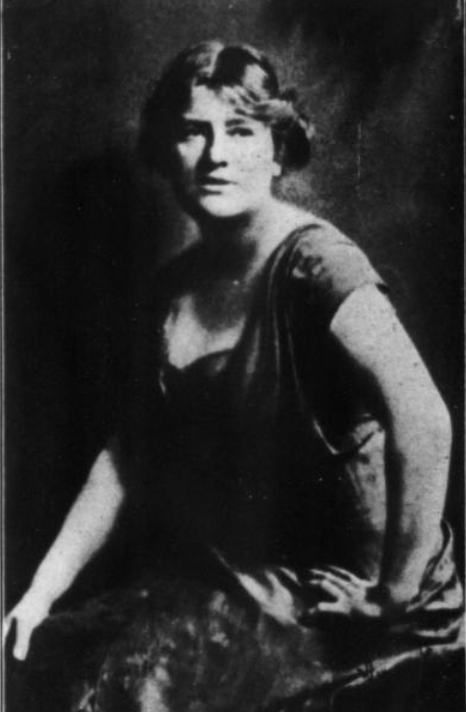
Inez Haynes Irwin, from a 1918 publication

In August 1897, Inez Haynes married Rufus H. Gillmore, a newspaper editor, and assumed the name Inez Haynes Gillmore. The Gillmores visited pre-War Europe where she met Russian revolutionaries and French impressionist painters. While her husband supported her feminism, they later divorced. She published her first novel, June Jeopardy in 1908 and soon after became fiction editor of The Masses, a left-wing monthly magazine. In January 1916, she married writer William Henry Irwin, and her name changed to Inez Haynes Irwin, although she continued publishing under her former name, Inez Haynes Gillmore. The Irwins summered in Scituate, Massachusetts, during the early 1900s. During World War I the Irwins lived in Europe where she worked as a war correspondent in England, France and Italy. Inez Haynes estimated that between 500,000 and 750,000 women were killed in the war. William Henry died in 1948 and she moved to Scituate, Massachusetts, where she remained until her death at the age of 97 on September 25, 1970.

Inez Haynes was a feminist leader and a political activist. She was a member of the National Advisory Council of the National Woman's Party, and wrote the Party's biography, The Story of the Woman's Party, in 1921. She also wrote a history of American women, Angels and Amazons: A Hundred Years of American Women (1933).

=== Writing career ===
Apart from the non-fiction works noted above, she published over 30 novels, including Angel Island (1914), a "radical feminist Swiftian fantasy" about a group of men stranded on an island occupied by winged women. Angel Island was republished in 1988 as a "classic of early feminist literature" with an introduction by science fiction and fantasy author Ursula K. Le Guin. Her fiction often addressed feminist issues and the plight of women, including divorce, single parenthood and problems in the workplace.

Her 15-book "Maida" series of children's books was written over a period of 45 years, and tells the story of Maida Westabrook, a school girl whose mother has died and whose father is very wealthy.

She also wrote short stories for magazines, one of which, "The Spring Flight," won her the O. Henry Memorial Prize in 1924.

== Associations ==
- Author's Guild of America, vice-President, 1930–1931; president, 1931–1933
- National Collegiate Equal Suffrage League, co-founder
- Chairman of board of directors of the World Center for Women's Archives, 1936–1938/1940.
- Member of American committee of Prix Femina, 1931–1933

Source: Feminist Science Fiction, Fantasy and Utopia

== Awards ==
- O. Henry Award, 1924 – for her short story, "The Spring Flight"

Source: Feminist Science Fiction, Fantasy and Utopia

== Selected works ==
=== Novels ===
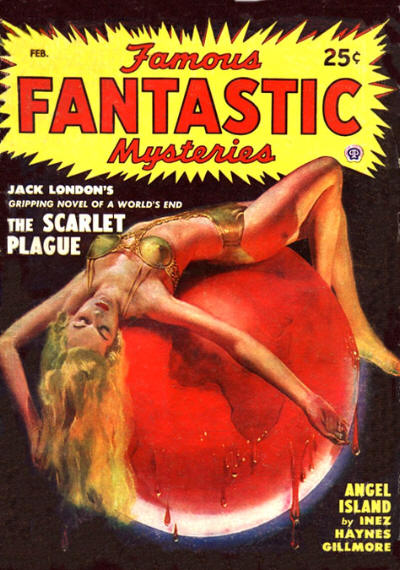
Angel Island was reprinted in the February 1949 issue of Famous Fantastic Mysteries

- June Jeopardy, Huebsch, 1908
- Phoebe and Ernest, Holt, 1910 – illustrated by R. F. Schabelitz
- Janey: being the record of a short interval in the journey through life and the struggle with society of a little girl of nine, Holt, 1911
- Phoebe, Ernest, and Cupid, Holt, 1912 – illustrated by R. F. Schabelitz
- Angel Island, Holt, 1914 – reprinted, Arno, 1978; new edition, NAL Plume, 1988 with an introduction by Ursula K. Le Guin
- The Ollivant Orphans, Holt 1915
- The Lady of Kingdoms, George H. Doran, 1917
- The Happy Years, Holt, 1919
- Out of the Air, Harcourt, 1921
- The Lost Diana (novella), Everybody's Magazine, June 1923
- Discarded, serialized in The American Magazine, May–November 1925
- Gertrude Haviland's Divorce, Harper, 1925
- Gideon, Harper, 1927
- P.D.F.R.: A New Novel, Harper, 1928
- Family Circle, Bobbs-Merrill, 1931
- Youth Must Laugh, Bobbs-Merrill, 1932
- Strange Harvest, Bobbs-Merrill, 1934
- Murder Masquerade, H. Smith & R. Haas, 1935
- Little Miss Redhead, Lothrop, 1936 – self-illustrated
- The Poison Cross Mystery, H. Smith & R. Haas, 1936
- A Body Rolled Downstairs, Random House, 1938
- Many Murders, Random House, 1941
- The Women Swore Revenge, Random House, 1946

==== The Maida books ====
- Maida's Little Shop, Grosset & Dunlap, 1909
- Maida's Little House, Grosset & Dunlap, 1921
- Maida's Little School, Grosset & Dunlap, 1926
- Maida's Little Island, Grosset & Dunlap, 1939
- Maida's Little Camp, Grosset & Dunlap, 1940
- Maida's Little Village, Grosset & Dunlap, 1942
- Maida's Little Houseboat, Grosset & Dunlap, 1943
- Maida's Little Theater, Grosset & Dunlap, 1946
- Maida's Little Cabins, Grosset & Dunlap, 1947
- Maida's Little Zoo, Grosset & Dunlap, 1949
- Maida's Little Lighthouse, Grosset & Dunlap, 1951
- Maida's Little Hospital, Grosset & Dunlap, 1952
- Maida's Little Farm, Grosset & Dunlap, 1953
- Maida's Little House Party, Grosset & Dunlap, 1954
- Maida's Little Treasure Hunt, Grosset & Dunlap, 1955

=== Short stories ===
- "The Father of His Son", Everybody's Magazine, July 1904
- "A Doorstep Introduction", Pearson's Magazine, November 1904
- "Love Me, Love My Dog", Pearson's Magazine, November 1904
- "The Start", Everybody's Magazine, December 1904
- "The Amateur House-Party", The Smart Set, August 1907
- "The Matchbreakers", Hampton's Broadway Magazine, November 1908
- "The Eternal Challenge", Everybody's Magazine, January 1912
- "With Pitfall and With Gin", Pictorial Review, February 1912
- "The Woman Across the Street", Ladies' Home Journal, September 1916
- "The Sixth Canvassar", The Century, January 1916
- "The Last Cartridge", McCall's, October 1922
- "The Spring Flight", McCall's, June 1924 – winner of the 1924 O. Henry Memorial Prize
- "The Irish Language", Everybody's Magazine, July 1925

=== Non-fiction ===
- The Californiacs, A. M. Robertson, 1916 – a travel book about California
- The Native Son, A. M. Robertson, 1919 – a book on California
- The Story of the Woman's Party, Harcourt, 1921; published as Up Hill With Banners Flying, Traversity Press, 1964 – a biography of the National Woman's Party's and a history of the suffragists
- Angels and Amazons: A Hundred Years of American Women, Doubleday, 1933 – a collection of biographical sketches
- Good Manners for Girls, Appleton-Century, 1937
- "You Bet I Am!" (article), Woman's Day, October 1938
- Adventures of Yesterday, General Microfilm, 1973 – an autobiography

Source: Feminist Science Fiction, Fantasy and Utopia

== See also ==
- List of suffragists and suffragettes
