= Yu Hsiu Ku =

Chinese-American engineer

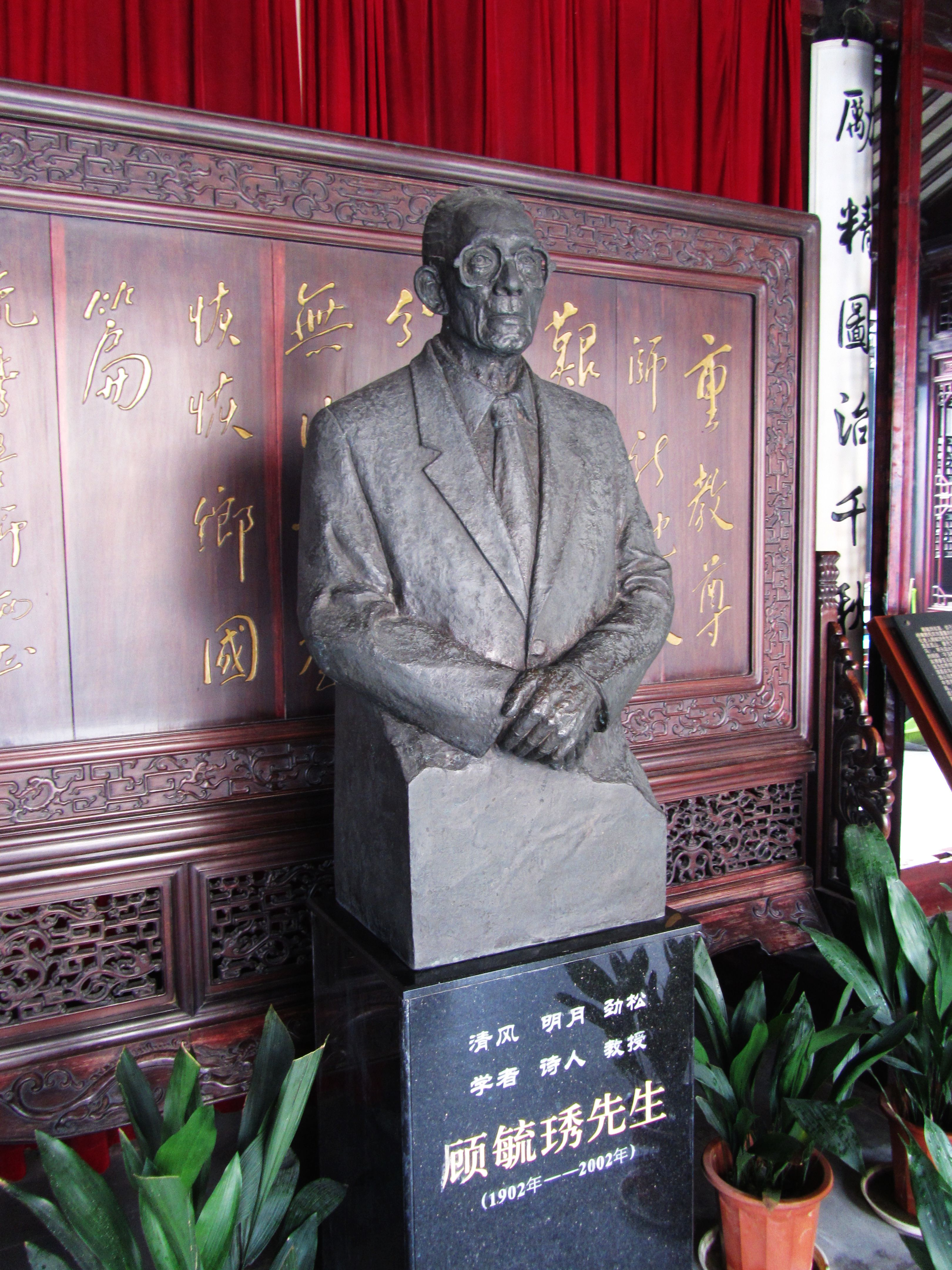
Statue of Ku at the Gu Yuxiu Memorial in Wuxi

Yu Hsiu Ku or Gu Yuxiu, courtesy name Yi Qiao (Chinese: 顾毓琇，字一樵 December 24, 1902 – September 9, 2002), was a Chinese-American electrical engineer, musician, novelist, poet, and politician. A polymathic academic, he was one of the first Chinese people to earn a doctorate from the Massachusetts Institute of Technology, in 1928, and became a leader in higher education in China until the fall of the Republic of China in 1949. Afterwards, he worked for many years as a professor of electrical engineering at the University of Pennsylvania.

Ku made contributions to Chinese literature, poetry, and music; to electrical engineering and applied mathematics; and to the history of Zen Buddhism. He became the president of two major Chinese universities, National Central University from 1944 to 1945 and National Chengchi University from 1947 to 1949. He also helped found the predecessor institutions of the Chinese Central Conservatory of Music and Shanghai Theatre Academy.

Politically, Ku served as deputy minister of education of China from 1938 to 1944. In 1968, as a member of the National Assembly of Taiwan, he became the first Taiwanese government official to visit the Soviet Union. He had close personal ties to several leaders of both mainland China and Taiwan, and assisted in negotiations between Chinese leader Jiang Zemin and Taiwanese leader Chen Shui-bian following the Hainan Island incident in 2001.

Ku became a fellow of the two predecessor societies to the Institute of Electrical and Electronics Engineers, which later awarded him its Lamme Medal and Third Millennium Medal. He was the recipient of two honorary doctorates and an honorary professorship. The IEEE/CSEE Yu-Hsiu Ku Electrical Engineering Award is named in his honor, and a museum dedicated to his accomplishments stands at his ancestral home in Wuxi.

== Biography ==
=== Education and early life ===
Ku was born in 1902 in Wuxi, Jiangsu Province, China. He completed his studies in China at the Tsing Hua School (now National Tsing Hua University) where his classmates included future educator Liang Shih-chiu and general Sun Li-jen. In 1920, he helped found a literary society at Tsing Hua with Liang, Wu Wenzao, Qi Xueqi, Wen Yiduo, Yu Shangyuan, and others.

He traveled to the United States on a scholarship to the Massachusetts Institute of Technology where, from 1923 to 1928, he completed a bachelor's degree, master's degree, and doctorate in electrical engineering in the record-setting span of three and a half years, with Percy Williams Bridgman and Alfred North Whitehead among his mentors. In doing so he became the first Chinese person to be awarded a doctorate from MIT. His doctoral dissertation, supervised by Vannevar Bush, concerned transients in alternating current devices. While at MIT, Ku continued to find time for cultural as well as technical activities, for instance working with Liang to translate the Tale of the Pipa into English for a 1925 performance featuring Liang and Bing Xin as actors.

After graduating, he worked briefly for Robert Doherty at General Electric before returning to China.

=== Life in China ===
Returning to China in 1929, he became professor and chair of the Department of Engineering at Zhejiang University from 1929 to 1930; dean at National Central University from 1931 to 1932; and chair of Electrical Engineering and Founding Dean of Engineering of Tsinghua University from 1932 to 1937. He was also director of the Aeronautic Research Institute in China from 1934 to 1937 and director of the first Electronics Research Institute in China from 1935 to 1937. During this period, he became known for leading projects in which Tsinghua University students made thousands of gas masks out of makeshift materials to assist in fighting the Japanese in the incidents leading up to the Second Sino-Japanese War. His educational philosophy was that undergraduate engineers should focus on basics rather than narrow specializations.

He became Principal Deputy Minister of Education under minister Chen Lifu from 1938 to 1944; in this period he relocated China's universities inland from the coastal areas of China to remove them from the Japanese occupation. He then became president of National Central University from 1944 to 1945. From 1945 to 1947, Ku served as Education Commissioner for Shanghai and as an adjunct professor of electrical engineering at National Jiaotong University in Shanghai. He was the president of National Chengchi University in Nanjing from 1947 to 1949, succeeding Chiang Kai-shek there. During this time he visited the Republic of China Occupation Mission in Tokyo sometimes for his duties. He became friends with the Mission Head, General Zhu Si-Ming, an MIT alumnus. General Chu Shih-ming

=== Life in the United States ===
After the fall of the Republic of China to the communists in 1949, Ku left China. He worked as a visiting professor of electrical engineering at MIT from 1950 to 1952 before finding a permanent position as a professor of electrical engineering in the Moore School of Electrical Engineering of the University of Pennsylvania. He retired in 1972.

== Politics ==
Ku became a member of the National Assembly of Taiwan; a trip he took to a scientific conference in Moscow in 1968 became the first visit of a Taiwanese government official to the Soviet Union since 1949. In 1972 he traveled to Taiwan to participate in the fifth plenary session of the assembly. However, in 1979 he was expelled from the National Assembly and from the Kuomintang after traveling to mainland China.

He has connections as a friend, teacher, or advisor to several leaders of both Taiwan and China, including Jiang Zemin, whom he taught at Shanghai Jiao-Tong University in the 1930s and who visited him in Pennsylvania in the 1990s, Zhou Enlai, Mao Zedong, and Chiang Kai-shek, whom he worked with as deputy education minister, Deng Xiaoping, and Lee Teng-hui, who wrote Ku a poem for his 90th birthday.

Later in his life, he described himself as "nonpolitical", "not on either side", and "for world peace". He used his neutral position and connections in 2001 as a negotiator between China and Taiwan after the Hainan Island incident.

== Cultural contributions ==
Ku published twenty volumes of literary works and poems. He founded the National Conservancy, the predecessor of the Central Conservatory of Music, and the Shanghai Municipal Experimental Theatre School, the predecessor of the Shanghai Theatre Academy. He also served as acting president of the Shanghai National Institute of Music, temporarily removed from Shanghai to Chongqing, in 1941.

A 2001 concert featuring his works was attended by Chinese Communist Party general secretary Jiang Zemin. In 2012, another concert at the Central Conservatory of Music featured his works and honored the 110th anniversary of his birth.

== Awards and honors ==
Ku became a fellow of the American Institute of Electrical Engineers, one of the predecessor institutes of the Institute of Electrical and Electronics Engineers (IEEE), in 1945; in 1961 the other IEEE predecessor institution, the Institute of Radio Engineers, also named him as a fellow. He was elected to the Academia Sinica in 1959.

The IEEE gave Ku the IEEE Lamme Medal in 1972, "in recognition of his outstanding contributions to analysis of the transient behavior of a-c machines and systems". In 1999 the IEEE gave him their Third Millennium Medal, citing his "major technical contributions in the areas of electrical machinery, nonlinear systems and the theory of nonlinear control".

The University of Pennsylvania gave him an honorary doctorate in literature and humanities in 1972, on the occasion of his retirement. National Tsing Hua University gave him another honorary doctorate in 2001, and in the same year Peking University gave him an honorary professorship.

The IEEE Power & Energy Society and Chinese Society for Electrical Engineering created the Yu-Hsiu Ku Electrical Engineering Award in his honor. The award recognizes professional performance in electricity, electrical machinery, power system engineering, or related fields that has had a lasting beneficial impact on the Chinese society. Ku was one of the founders of the CSEE, in 1934.

The Gu Yuxiu Memorial, a museum and cultural center dedicated to Ku, opened in 2006 at the site of Ku's ancestral home in Wuxi, and became a protected cultural site of Jiangsu Province in 2011.
