= Furongxiu =

Chinese opera singer and actress

Furongxiu (Chinese: 芙蓉秀) was a Chinese opera singer and exponent of nanxi during the Yuan dynasty.

Furongxiu was from Jinhua, but her private life is otherwise unknown. As an artist, she was famous in contemporary China. She was active as an opera singer within the xiaoling opera, as well as dramatic actress within the zaju theater. The contemporary art critic Xia Tingzhi (1316–1370) described her as one of the elite members of stage art, famed for her talent within both opera and drama.
