= Robert Edmond Jones =

American costume designer (1887–1954)

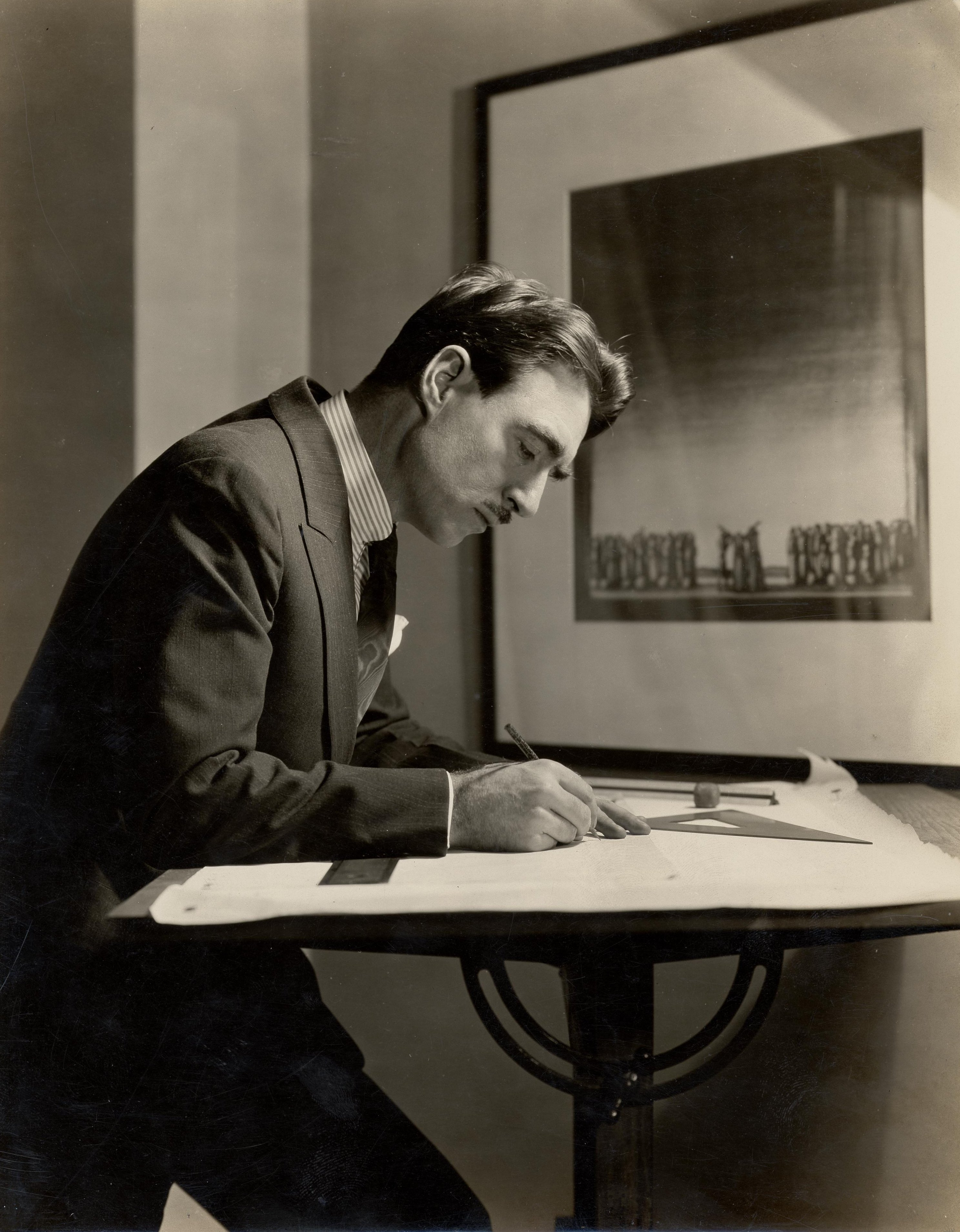
- Robert Edmond Jones (circa 1920)
- Born: December 12, 1887; Milton, New Hampshire, United States
- Died: November 26, 1954 (aged 66); United States
- Education: Harvard University
- Occupation: Costume designer

Robert Edmond Jones (December 12, 1887 – November 26, 1954) was an American scenic, lighting, and costume designer.

He is credited with incorporating the new stagecraft into the American drama. His designs sought to integrate scenic elements into the storytelling instead of having them stand separate and indifferent from the play's action. His visual style, often referred to as simplified realism, combined bold vivid use of color and simple, yet dramatic, lighting.

== Life ==
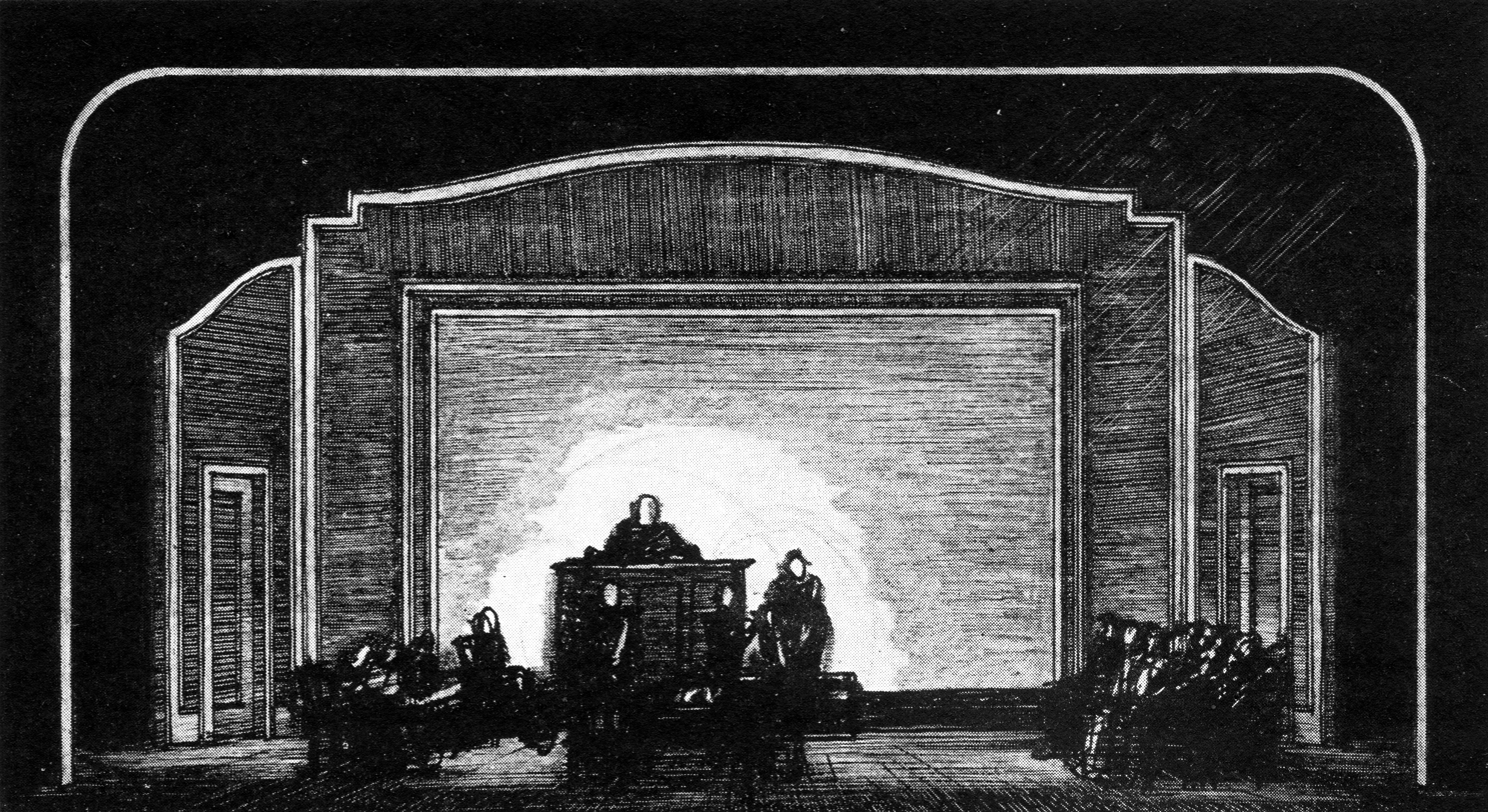
Set design by Robert Edmond Jones for the courtroom in Machinal (1928)

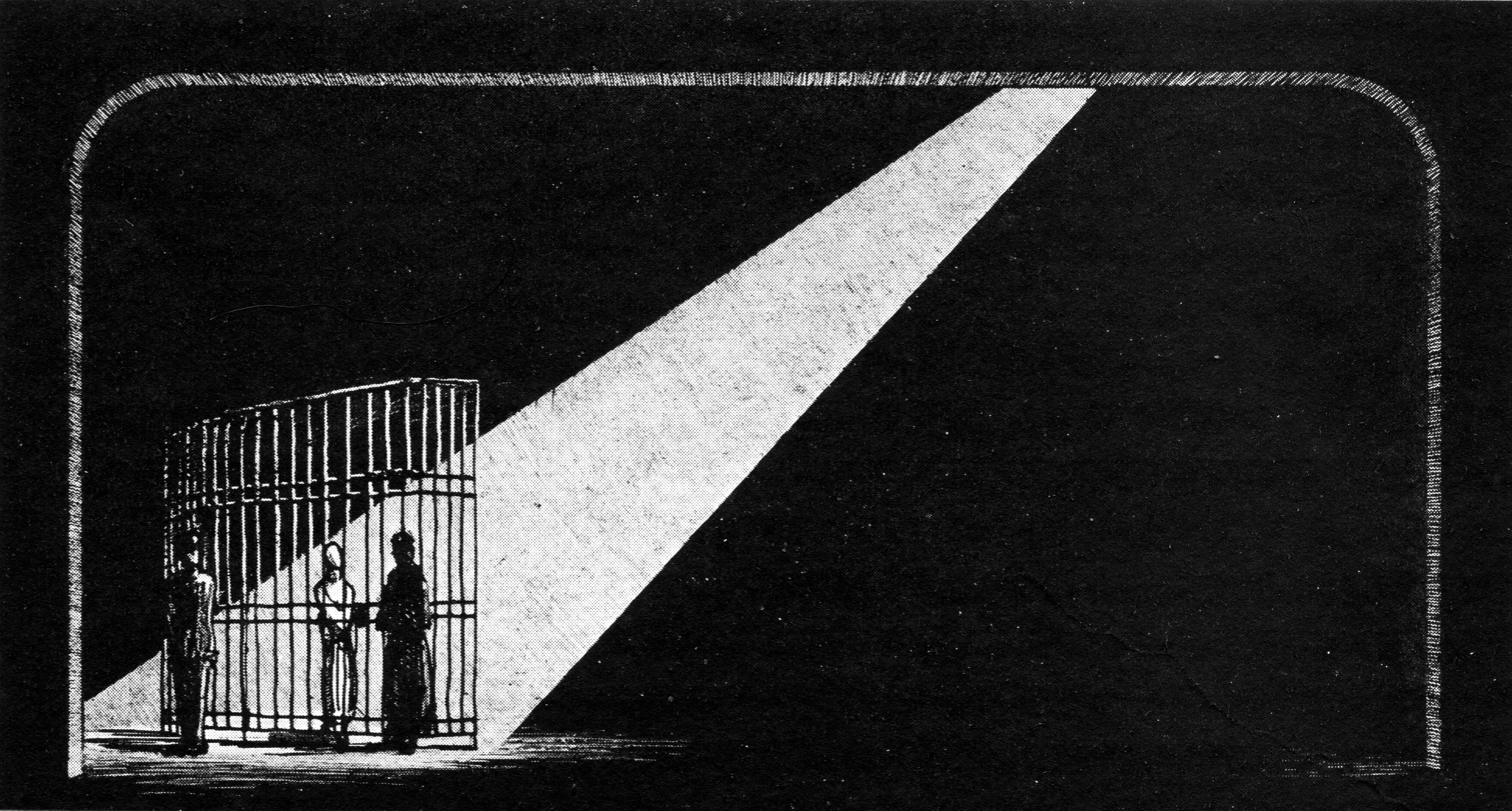
Set design by Robert Edmond Jones for the condemned woman's cell in Machinal (1928)

Born in Milton, New Hampshire, Jones attended Harvard University and graduated in 1910. Jones eventually moved to New York (1912), where, with friends made at Harvard, he began to do small design jobs. In 1913 Jones and several friends sailed to Europe to study the new stagecraft with Edward Gordon Craig in Florence. The school in Florence would not accept Jones, so he went to Berlin instead, spending a year in informal study with Max Reinhardt's Deutsches Theater.

For a 1915 production of The Man Who Married a Dumb Wife directed by Harley Granville-Barker, Jones designed a fairly simple set that complemented the action and the other design elements of the production rather than overwhelming it.

His innovative designs for Vladimir Rosing's American Opera Company in 1927 and 1928 were praised by critics.

Jones also brought his expressionistic style to many productions put on by the Theatre Guild, with innovative designs for The Philadelphia Story (1937), Othello (1943), and The Iceman Cometh (1946). Jones's biggest commercial success was with The Green Pastures (1930), which, if we include its revival in 1951, played for a total of 1,642 performances. This revival was Jones's last production. Other Broadway credits include Holiday (1928), Mourning Becomes Electra (1931), Ah, Wilderness! (1933), Juno and the Paycock (1940), and Lute Song (1946). Jones was also the production designer for some early three-color Technicolor films, such as La Cucaracha (1934) and Becky Sharp (1935), for which he also designed the costumes.

Though he created a makeshift set for the very first "production" of the Provincetown Players in the living room of Neith Boyce and Hutchins Hapgood's cottage in July 1915, Jones was not a member but a friend of the Provincetown Players and he worked closely with his friend Eugene O'Neill on many of his productions including Anna Christie, The Great God Brown, and Desire Under the Elms. He was a member of the Triumvirate leadership (with O'Neill and Kenneth Macgowan) of the Experimental Theatre, Inc., that look over the Provincetown Playhouse in 1924 for two years.

Jones published many articles on theatre design in the course of his career. His books include Drawings for the Theatre (1925), and The Dramatic Imagination (1941); he also illustrated Kenneth Macgowan's Continental Stagecraft (1922).

His book The Dramatic Imagination is considered the definitive work on modern stage design in the first half of the 20th century.

He died in the house he was born in on Thanksgiving Day, 1954.
