= Gao Ming =

Chinese poet and playwright (c.1305–1370)

Gao Ming (Chinese: 高明; pinyin: Gāo Míng; Wade–Giles: Kao Ming; c. 1305 – 1370), also known as Kao Ming, Gao Zecheng, and the Cabbage Root Taoist, was a Chinese poet and playwright during the Yuan Dynasty.

Gao was born and grew up in Wenzhou. In 1345, needing to find a way to support his widowed mother, he sat and passed the Imperial Examinations and was given a post in Zhejiang (Chouzhou) as a minor district official. In this capacity he served under the writer Su Tianjue, and helped edit some of Su's work. From 1348 to 1351, Gao was involved in suppressing the Red Turban Rebellion, taking military action against the early Han rebel Fang Guozhen. After Fang's defeat, Gao was given a post as assessor of Shaoxing. Fang later attempted to employ Gao as a teacher, an offer which Gao politely declined.

Dissatisfied with the civil service, he retired in 1356 and moved to Ningbo (Yinxian) to write for the theatre, focussing on the nanxi genre. His friend Liu Ji attempted to draw him out of retirement by persuading the Hongwu Emperor to involve Gao in the writing of the official history of the Yuan; Gao, however, declined, citing mental illness.

== Tale of the Pipa ==
Gao's most famous work, and the only one of his plays still extant, is Tale of the Pipa (Pipa ji 琵琶记; also translated as The Story of the Lute or The Lute). A complete English language translation appeared in 1980.

In 1946 an adaptation of Tale of the Pipa, entitled Lute Song, was produced on Broadway. It starred Yul Brynner and Mary Martin.
