= Angel Island (novel) =

1914 novel by Inez Haynes Gillmore

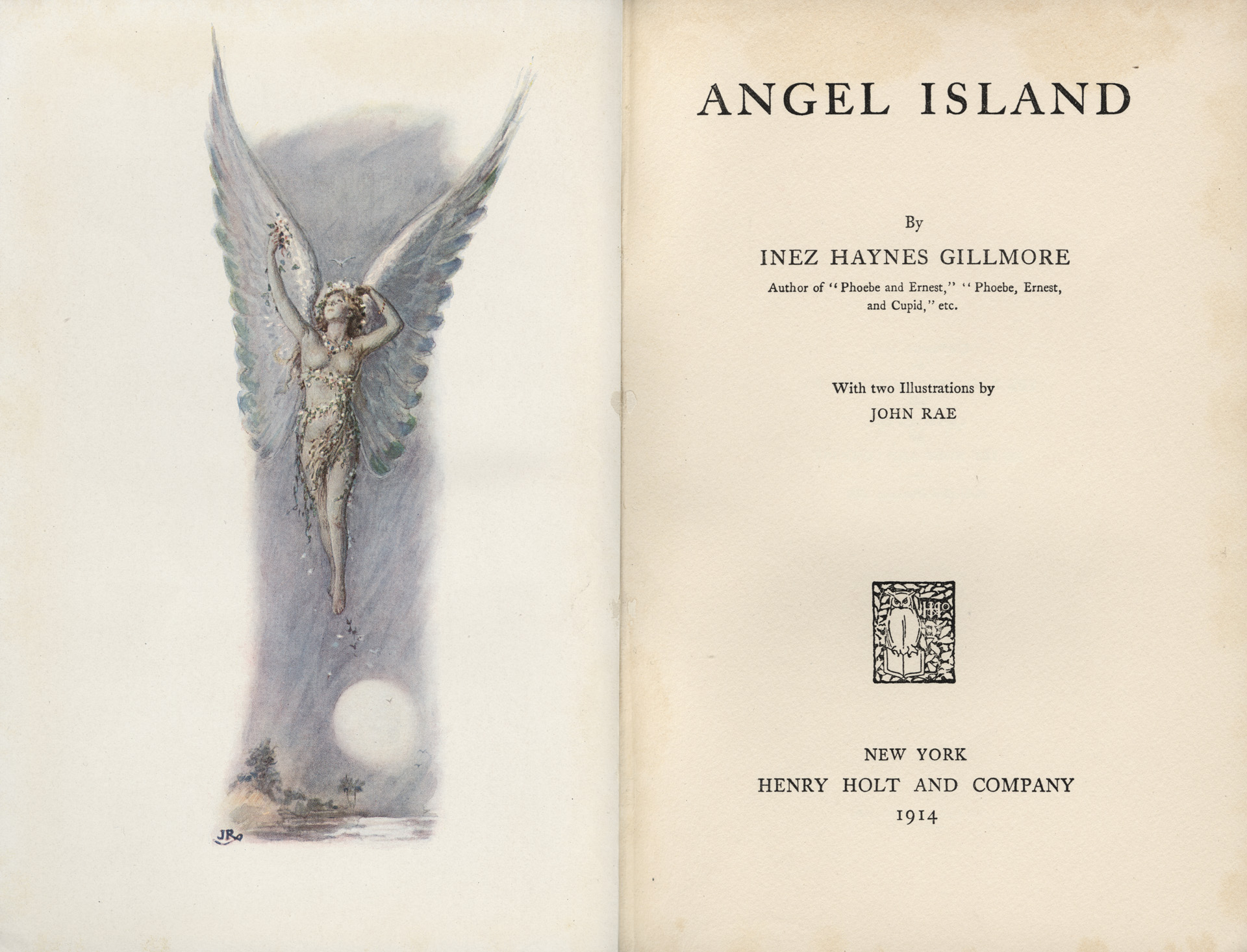
- Frontispiece for the 1914 edition
- Author: Inez Haynes Gillmore
- Illustrator: John Rae
- Language: English
- Genre: Feminist science fiction
- Published: 1914 (Henry Holt)
- Publication place: United States
- Media type: Print (hardback)
- Pages: 351 (hardback)

Angel Island is a science fiction/fantasy novel by American feminist author, journalist and suffragette Inez Haynes Irwin, writing under the name Inez Haynes Gillmore. It was originally published by Henry Holt in January 1914. The novel is about a group of men shipwrecked on an island occupied by winged-women.

Angel Island was reprinted in the February 1949 issue of Famous Fantastic Mysteries, and again in 1978 by Arno Press. In 1988 it was republished by Plume as a "classic of early feminist literature" with an introductory essay by science fiction and fantasy author Ursula K. Le Guin.

== Plot summary ==
Five men are shipwrecked on an island in the Pacific Ocean while en route from America to the Orient. They are the only survivors, and their chances of being rescued are remote as a storm had driven their ship into uncharted waters before smashing it against rocks. The island is 20 miles long by 7 miles wide, and densely wooded with a freshwater lake in the center. After coming to terms with their predicament, the men begin collecting what they can from washed-up wreckage from the ship: food, clothes, tools and materials. They start building a camp near the beach and bemoan the fact that they are stuck on an island without women. But as the weeks pass, they begin to relish the absence of women and call the island an "Eveless Eden".

Then one day the men start seeing what look like huge birds flying high in the sky, but when the "birds" come closer they realise that they are five beautiful winged-women. Suddenly the men are interested in women again and change the island's name to "Angel Island". Over time the women gradually come closer and start following the men around, who quickly fall in love with the women and name them Julia (their leader), Lulu, Chiquita, Clara and Peachy. But the men become frustrated by the women's aloofness and how easily they frighten, and decide to capture them, saying that they need pampering and protection. Once caught the men subdue the frightened women and cut off their wings. The women, who cannot walk on their small, delicate feet, are now completely helpless. The men quickly win their hearts by showering them with gifts and attention, and teach them English. The men and women pair off and four of them marry; Julia resists this temptation. With the women now domesticated, the men start paying less attention to them and spend long periods inland building a new camp near the lake. The women, who cannot fly, nor walk any distance, are stuck in the camp near the beach.

With plenty of time on their hands, the women reminisce on how it was when they could fly. Back home, the five women, led by Julia, had rebelled when their people decided to migrate south, and flew north instead. They found Angel Island, deserted and inviting. Then the men came and the women were fascinated by these wingless creatures. They followed them, teased them, and then made the mistake of falling in love with them, resulting in their capture. The women long to fly again, but the men keep their wings clipped. Soon each of the women bears a child, four wingless boys, and a winged-girl, Angela. As Angela grows up she starts flying and the women are delighted. The men, however, are not so happy and announce that when Angela is older they will cut her wings. The women have accepted their own fate, but decide to put aside their "appealing helplessness" and stand up for Angela.

While the men are working at the new camp each day, the women teach themselves how to walk. When their feet are strong enough, they trek to the new camp one day, unannounced and much to the surprise of the men. Julia presents the men with an ultimatum, let Angela keep her wings, or they will leave the island with the children. The men laugh and remind them that they cannot fly. But the women, with wing stumps that have grown since their last clipping, take off and fly (not very gracefully) over the lake. The men, horrified at the prospect of losing their women, beg them to return and promise not to cut Angela's wings. Things change on Angel Island, and the men have a new respect for the women. Not only do they honor their promise about Angela's wings, they stop clipping the women's wings. Julia decides to marry and her final triumph comes years later on her death bed when she gives birth to a son with wings.

== Major characters ==
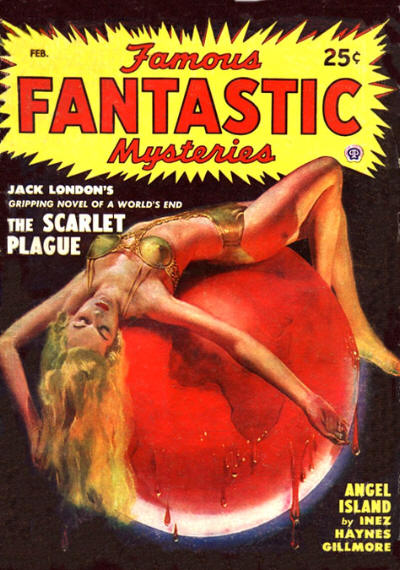
Angel Island was reprinted in the February 1949 issue of Famous Fantastic Mysteries

The ship-wrecked men

- Frank Merrill – self-appointed leader of the men; a professor of a small mid-West university and a solitary person; believes women should not receive any special treatment
- Honey Smith – a businessman in partnership with Billy Fairfax; not that smart but very popular, particularly with women; believes women should be spoiled and pampered
- Pete Murphy – an Irish writer, clever, but has a weakness for women's charm; believes women are angels and should be worshipped
- Billy Fairfax – a businessman in partnership with Honey Smith; lacking charm, but in possession of a huge fortune; believes women should be cherished and protected
- Ralph Addington – a salesman with a strong personality; tends to be course and arrogant; believes women should be tamed, subjugated and controlled

The winged-women, named by the men

- Julia – Billy Fairfax's wife and leader of the women; silver winged and "heroic" and "clear-sighted"; dubbed "the quiet one" by the men
- Lulu – Honey Smith's wife; orange winged and "chattering"; dubbed "the plain one"
- Chiquita – Frank Merrill's wife; scarlet winged and "lazy" and "voluptuous"; dubbed "the dark one"
- Clara – Pete Murphy's wife; green and gold winged and "excitement-craving"; dubbed "the thin one"
- Peachy – Ralph Addington's wife; blue winged and "poetic"; dubbed "the peachy one"

== Reception and analysis ==
A 1914 review in The New York Times described Angel Island as "a decidedly unusual book" saying that it is "part allegory, part fairy tale, part realistic". The review praised Gillmore for her treatment of the sexes, saying that she does not disparage one at the expense of the other. It added that much of the text is on a "high poetic level", and that it is a novel of "sound, prosaic truths" and "high ideals and beautiful imaginings". Science fiction and fantasy author Ursula K. Le Guin, in her introduction to the 1988 edition of the book, reminded the reader that at the time of its original publication in 1914, women could not vote. She wrote that the book is a "real discovery", and described it as "romantic, satiric, funny, fanciful, and a good read".

Eric Leif Davin in Partners in Wonder: Women and the Birth of Science Fiction, 1926–1965 described Angel Island is a "radical feminist Swiftian fantasy". Angel Island's entry in Science-fiction, the Early Years called it as a "sexual Robinsonade with a strong element of allegory". It said that while on the surface the novel is "commercial desert-island fiction", it is an allegorical story of women's freedom. Andrea Kempf wrote in Shared Lives: Women Who Wrote for Women that Gillmore's book, using wings as a metaphor, "soars". Kempf said that while Gillmore's men and women are stereotypes, the women rise above their moodiness and rebel when their children are threatened. In Utopian and Science Fiction by Women: Worlds of Difference Jane L. Donawerth felt that she is not convinced of Julia's "greatest glory" at the end of Angel Island. She said that Julia is the "strongest, smartest character" in the novel, but felt that when she decides to marry, she too became domesticated.

A reviewer of the book at Feminist Science Fiction, Fantasy, & Utopia said that as "a fantasy written by a feminist", Angel Island is important, but felt that the women were too complicit in their own mistreatment. The novel's stereotypic typecasting of men (aggressive with intellectual drive) and women (vain and coy) appear "jarring and sexist to modern readers", but those were the "unstated assumptions of 19th century US", and the women on Angel Island confront and overcome them. The reviewer concluded that it is a worthwhile read because of its "subtle liberal feminist insistence that regardless of our gender, we all have a right to fulfil our potential – to fly".

== Work cited ==
- Bleiler, Everett Franklin; Bleiler, Richard (1990). Science-fiction, the Early Years. Kent State University Press. ISBN 0-87338-416-4.
- Davin, Eric Leif (2006). Partners in Wonder: Women and the Birth of Science Fiction, 1926–1965. Lexington Books. ISBN 0-7391-1267-8.
- Donawerth, Jane L. (1994). Utopian and Science Fiction by Women: Worlds of Difference. Syracuse University Press. ISBN 0-8156-2620-7.
- Gillmore, Inez Haynes (2009) [1914]. Angel Island (EPUB). Project Gutenberg.
- Kempf, Andrea (1994). "Shared Lives: Women Who Wrote for Women". Scholar Space at Johnson County Community College.
