= Syphilid =

- Specialty: Infectious diseases

A syphilid is any of the cutaneous and mucous membrane lesions characteristic of secondary and tertiary syphilis.

== See also ==
- Id reactions
- List of cutaneous conditions
