= Gazan Bazin, Hormozgan =

Gazan Bazin گزان بزين
- Village
- Location within Iran
- Coordinates: 26°20′30″N 57°17′12″E
- Country: Iran
- Province: Hormozgan
- County: Sirik
- Bakhsh: Byaban
- Rural District: Byaban

Population (2006)
  - Total: 169
- Time zone: UTC+3:30 (IRST)
  - Summer (DST): UTC+4:30 (IRDT)

Gazan Bazin (Persian: گزان بزين, also Romanized as Gazān Bazīn) is a village in Byaban Rural District, Byaban District, Sirik County, Hormozgan Province, Iran. At the 2006 census, its population was 169, in 30 families.
