= François Xavier Bazin =

French archetier / bow maker (1824 - 1865)

François-Xavier Bazin (10 May 1824 – 1 August 1865) was a French archetier and master bow maker, and was first of the Bazin dynasty.

Bazin was born in Mirecourt to Joseph Eustache Bazin (1785-1863), judiciary clerk, and Marguerite Laurent. Notable experts suggest that he was influenced and purportedly studied with Dominique Peccatte and Jean-Baptiste Vuillaume in Paris, then established himself in Mirecourt around 1840. He was brother of Charles-Nicolas Bazin I, and father of Charles Nicolas Bazin II.

On 25 August 1845 he married Jeanne Hélène Maucotel, an embroiderer. They had six children, including Charles Nicolas Bazin, the bow maker.

A catalogue of Louis Bazin & Son mentions him "Manufacture d'Archets de violons - Maison fondée en 1840". As the first prominent Bazin bow makers, he fuelled the social rise of the family. He invested in real estate, including the 'Hauts de Chaumont' vineyard.

Bazin taught bow making to his son Charles Nicolas Bazin. He died at the age of 41, apparently of cholera. François-Xavier made only a small number of bows, but this was sufficient to establish the family’s reputation. He made excellent bows in Peccatte style. His bows are rare.

Bazin was a master bow maker, who was very much influenced by Dominique Peccatte. According to Italian bow expert Paolo Sarri: "Two are the periods of his work. The first, characterized by lines that remind authors such as Nicolas Maline and Joseph Fonclause, with angular shapes influenced the Peccattian school. In the late '50s, following the current fashion, he comes back to a softer style similar to Voirin's one." He added: "Because of his untimely death, Francois Xavier's bows are not so easy to find"
