= Antoine Bazin =

French sinologist

- Born: Antoine-Pierre-Louis Bazin; 26 March 1799; Saint-Brice-sous-Forêt
- Died: January 1863 (aged 63)
- Occupation: sinologist

Antoine-Pierre-Louis Bazin (French pronunciation: [ɑ̃twan pjɛʁ lwi bazɛ̃]), or A. P. L. Bazin (26 March 1799 – January 1863) was a French sinologist born in Saint-Brice-sous-Forêt. He was the brother of dermatologist Pierre-Antoine-Ernest Bazin (1807-1878).

Bazin studied at the Collège de France, where he was a pupil of Jean-Pierre Abel-Rémusat (1788-1832) and Stanislas Julien (1797-1873). Beginning in 1840 he was a professor of Chinese at the École des langues orientales. During his career, he also served as assistant director of the Société Asiatique. He contributed numerous articles to the Journal asiatique and published translations of Yuan dynasty plays.

== Works ==
- Théâtre Chinois; Ou, Choix De Pièces De Théâtre, Composées Sous Les Empereurs Mongols, Traduites Pour La Première Fois Sur Le Texte Original, Précédées D'une Introduction Et Accompagnées De Notes. (Paris: Imprimerie royale, 1838). HathiTrust Digital Library Online Version
- Notice du ″Chan-Haï-King″, cosmographie fabuleuse attribuée au grand Yu (1840).
- Kao, Ming. Le Pi-Pa-Ki: Ou, L'histoire Du Luth: Drame Chinois De Kao-Tong-Kia Représenté À Péking, En 1404 Avec Les Changements De Mao-Tseu. (Paris: Impr. royale, Histoire Du Luth., 1841). ISBN HathiTrust Digital Library Online Version
- Rapport fait à la Société Asiatique sur une chrestomathie chinoise publiée à Ning po en 1846 (1848)
- Le Siècle des Youên, ou Tableau historique de la littérature chinoise, depuis l'avènement des empereurs mongols jusqu'à la restauration des Ming (1850)
- Recherches sur les institutions administratives et municipales de la Chine (1854)
- Recherches sur l'origine, l'histoire et la constitution des ordres religieux dans l'Empire chinois (1856) HathiTrust Digital Library Online Version
- Grammaire mandarine, ou Principes généraux de la langue chinoise parlée (1856)
- Notice historique sur le Collège médical de Péking, d'après le ″Taï-thsing-hoeï-tièn″ (1857)
- Mémoires sur l'organisation intérieure des écoles chinoises (1859)
- Ho-Han-Chan ou La Tunique Confrontée. - Translation of Zhang Guobin (traditional Chinese: 張國賓; simplified Chinese: 张国宾; pinyin: Zhāng Guóbīn; Wade–Giles: Chang Kuo-pin). zaju He hanshan (Chinese: 合汗衫; pinyin: Hé hànshān; Wade–Giles: Ho han-shan). The title of this play has also been translated as "Joining the Shirt".
