= Will Irwin =

American journalist

William Henry Irwin
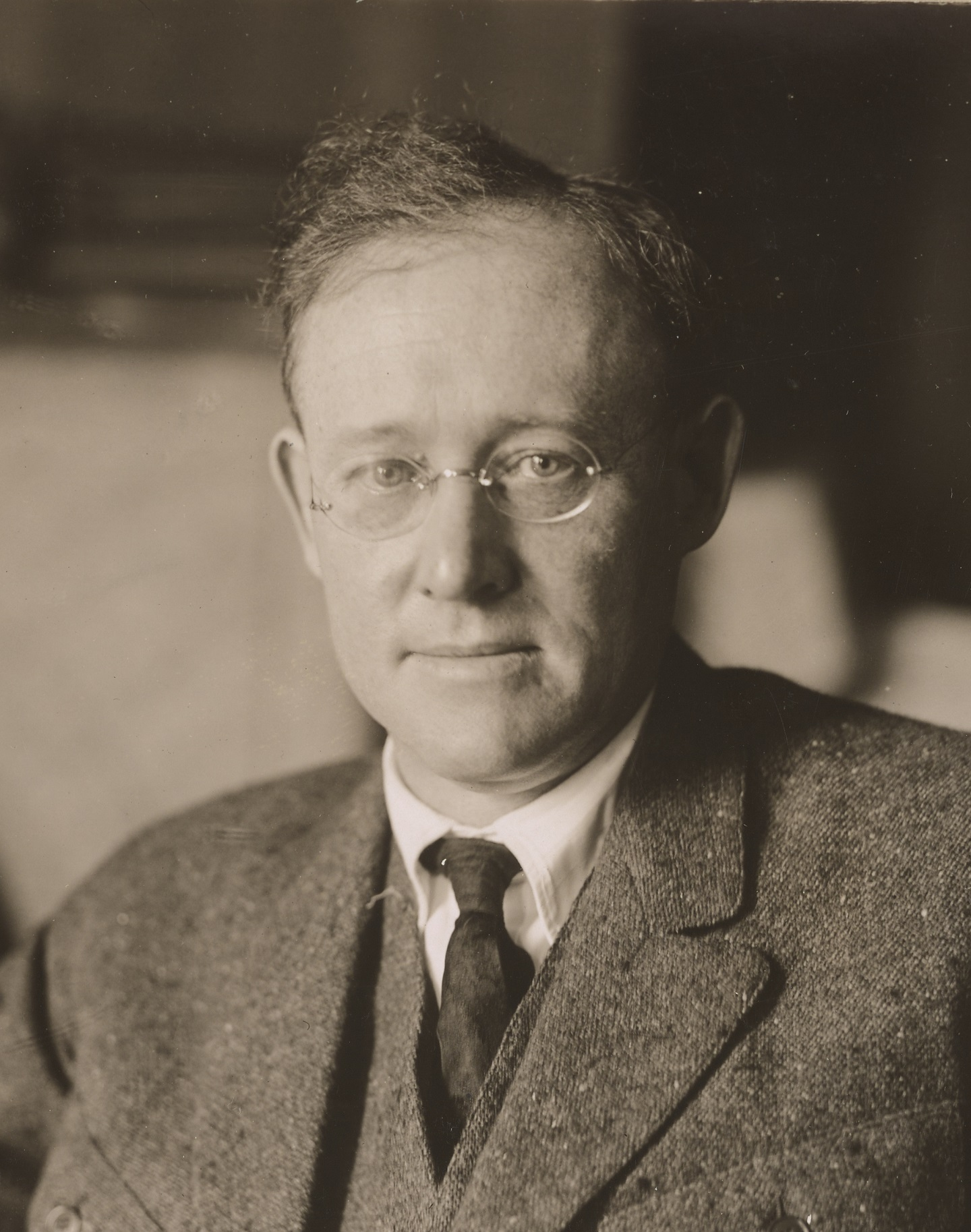
- Will Irwin in May 1918
- Born: September 14, 1873; Oneida, New York
- Died: February 24, 1948 (aged 74); Greenwich Village, New York
- Occupations: Journalist and author
- Spouse: Inez Haynes Irwin

William Henry Irwin (September 14, 1873 – February 24, 1948) was an American author, writer, and journalist who was associated with the muckrakers.

== Early life ==
Irwin was born in 1873 in Oneida, New York. In his early childhood, the Irwin family moved to Clayville, New York, a farming and mining center south of Utica. In about 1878, his father moved to Leadville, Colorado, established himself in the lumber business, and brought his family there. When his business failed, Irwin's father moved the family to Twin Lakes, Colorado. A hotel business there failed too, and the family moved back to Leadville in a bungalow at 125 West Twelfth Street. In 1889, the family moved to Denver, where he graduated from high school. He said he cured himself of a diagnosed bout of tuberculosis by "roughing it" for a year as a cowboy.

== University ==
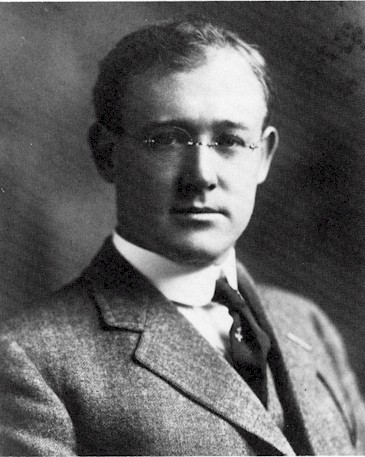
Will Irwin, photo published in San Francisco Call December 9, 1910. page 6, to accompany the story by Mary Ashe Miller, "Will Irwin Weaves 'The City That Was' Into Strong Novel."

With a loan from his high school teacher, Irwin entered Stanford University in September 1894. Irwin was forced to withdraw for disciplinary reasons but was readmitted and graduated on May 24, 1899. (Note: Irwin is sometimes said to have been a member of the Stanford Chaparral. However, Irwin graduated on May 24, 1899, and the first issue of The Chappie was published in October of that year.) According to journalism historians Clifford Weigle and David Clark in their biographical sketch of Irwin,

"During four riotous years at Stanford, Irwin 'specialized' in campus politics, undergraduate theatricals and writing, and beer drinking and inventive pranks. Expelled three weeks before he was to have received the B.A. degree in 1898, he got the degree a year later after final, solemn consideration by a somewhat reluctant faculty committee on student affairs."

== The Chronicle and The Sun ==
In 1901 Irwin got a job as a reporter on the San Francisco Chronicle, eventually rising to Sunday editor. For the San Francisco-based Bohemian Club, he wrote the Grove Play The Hamadryads, A Masque of Apollo in One Act' in 1904. The same year, he moved to New York City to take a reporter's position at The New York Sun, then in its heyday under the editorship of Chester Lord and Selah M. Clark. Also in 1904, Irwin co-authored a book of short stories with Gelett Burgess, The Picaroons (McClure, Phillips & Co.)

Irwin arrived in New York City the same day as a major disaster, the sinking of the General Slocum. As a new reporter on The Sun, he was assigned to work the Bellevue Hospital morgue, where the more than 1,000 bodies of the victims of fire and drowning were taken.

== The City That Was ==
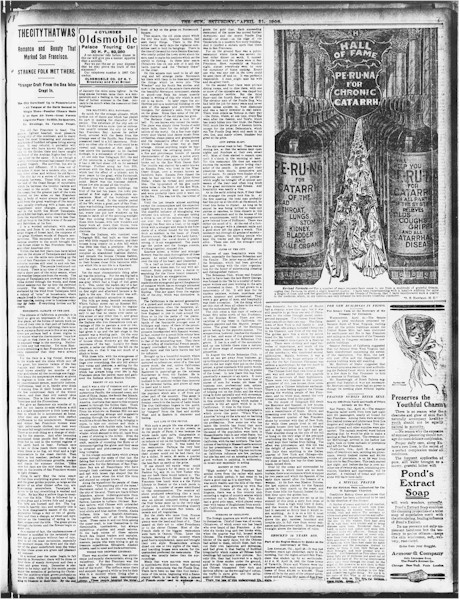
First installment of Irwin's series "The City That Was" as it appeared in The Sun, in New York City, Saturday, April 21, 1906, page 5

Irwin's biggest story and the feat that made his reputation as a journalist was his absentee coverage for The Sun, in New York City, of the San Francisco earthquake of April 18, 1906.

Weigle and Clark described his activities:

"Because he knew the city so well, he was assigned to write – mostly from memory, supplemented by scant telegraphic bulletins – the story of the quake. Before the last-edition deadline on the first day, April 18, 1906, he wrote fourteen columns of copy. and he kept writing, eight columns or more a day, for the next seven days, as fire swept the ruined city. The booklet, for which Irwin is most widely known, resulted from six or seven columns of the general description of pre-earthquake San Francisco that he wrote on the afternoon of the third day of the story."

== McClure's and Collier's ==
Irwin was hired by S.S. McClure in 1906 as managing editor of McClure's. He rose to the position of editor but disliked the work and then moved to Collier's, edited by Norman Hapgood. He wrote investigative stories on the movement for Prohibition and a study of fake spiritual mediums.

Back on the Pacific coast in 1906–1907 to research a story on anti-Japanese racism, Irwin returned to San Francisco and found it flourishing. Several years later, he wrote an article on the city's rebirth entitled "The City That Is" in the San Francisco Call, which concluded that San Francisco had become "a larger city, a more convenient city, and since it is also a more beautiful and more distinctive city I announce myself a complete convert. This city that was business is the old stuff."

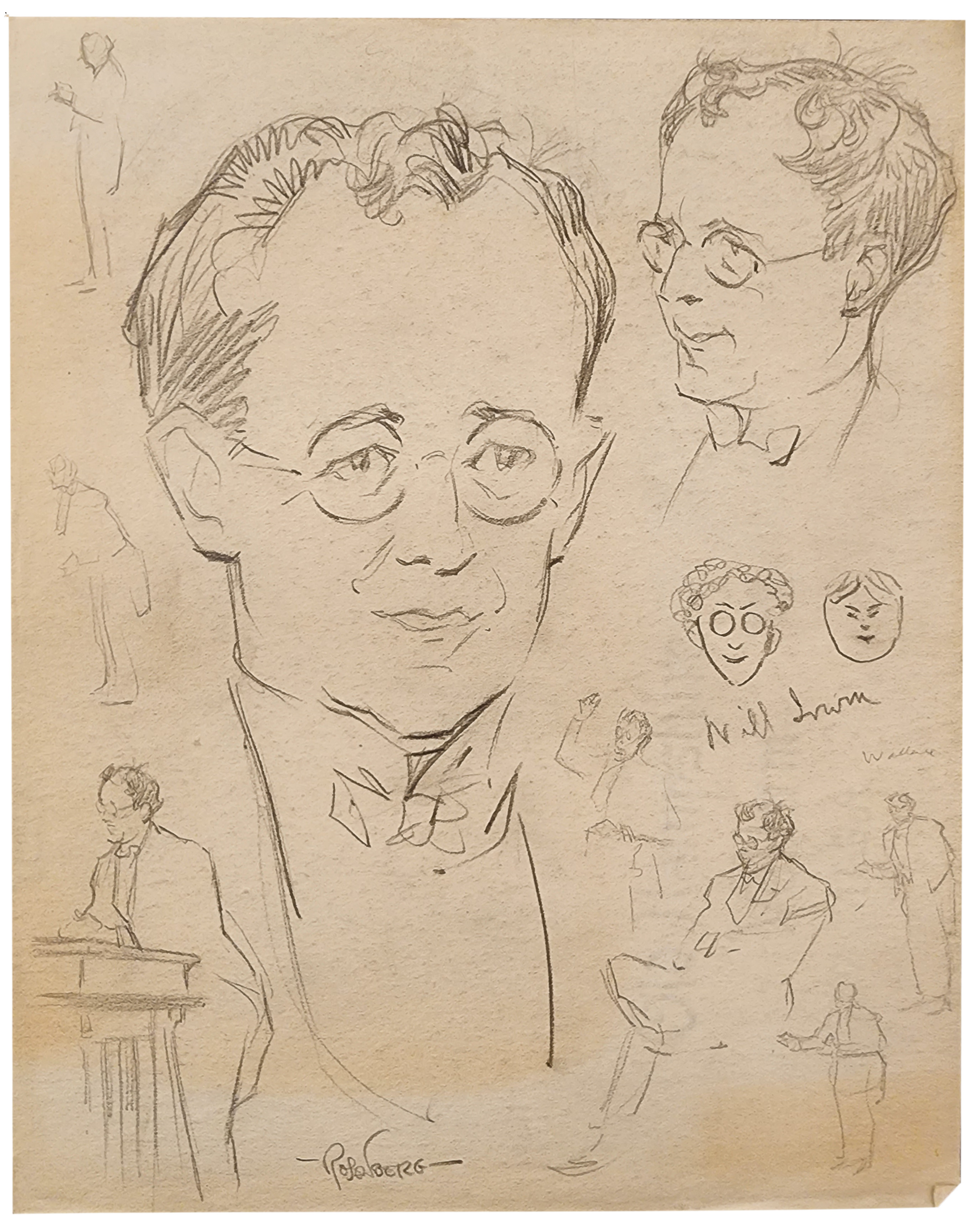
Signed drawing of Will Irwin by Manuel Rosenberg for the Cincinnati Post 1924

Irwin's series on anti-Japanese discrimination appeared in Collier's in September–October 1907 and Pearson's in 1909.

== "The American Newspaper" ==
Then came the Collier's magazine series, "The American Newspaper", one of the most famous critical analyses of American journalism. The series was researched from September 23, 1909, until late June 1910 and published from January to June 1911.

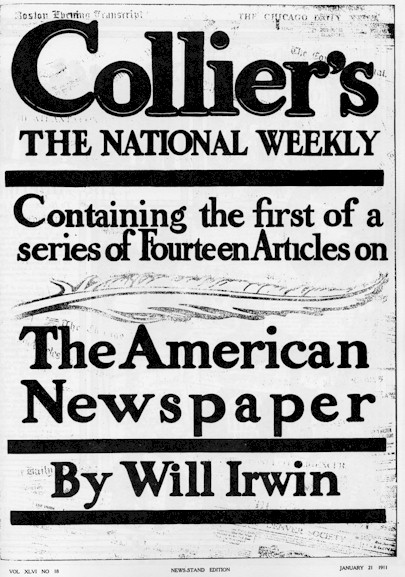
Collier's January 21, 1911. Cover of the first installment of Irwin's series "The American Newspaper."

== World War I ==
Irwin continued to write articles, some in the muckraking style, until the outbreak of World War I. He sailed to Europe in August 1914 as one of the first American correspondents. According to the media historians Edwin and Michael Emery

"[Irwin's] beats on the battles of Ypres and the first German use of poison gas were also printed in the Tribune. Irwin was one of several correspondents who represented American magazines in Europe; he first wrote for Collier's and then for the Saturday Evening Post. Irwin's article appeared on the front page of The New York Tribune on April 27, 1915.

Irwin served on the executive committee of Herbert Hoover's Commission for Relief in Belgium in 1914–1915 and was chief of the foreign department of George Creel's Committee on Public Information in 1918.

== Skeptic of spiritualism ==
Irwin was skeptical of paranormal claims. In 1907-1908, for the Colliers Weekly, he published four installments of "The Medium Game: Behind the Scenes with Spiritualism" to cover fraud and trickery associated with spiritualism.

The psychical researcher Hereward Carrington described Irwin as a well-known "exposer of fraudulent mediums."

== Books and plays ==
During and after the war Irwin wrote 17 more books, including Christ or Mars?, an anti-war treatise (1923); a biography of Herbert Hoover (1928); a history of Paramount Pictures and its founder, Adolph Zukor, The House That Shadows Built (1928); and his own autobiography, The Making of a Reporter (1942). He also wrote two plays and continued magazine writing.

== Personal life ==
Irwin was married to the feminist author, Inez Haynes Irwin, who published under the name Inez Haynes Gillmore, author of Angel Island (1914) and The Californiacs (1916). The Irwins summered in Scituate, Massachusetts, in the early 1900s. Will Irwin wrote a story in 1914 for The American Magazine about summer life in Scituate.

Irwin died in 1948, at the age of 74.

== See also ==
- The House That Shadows Built (1931). —Paramount Pictures promotional film that took its name from Irwin's book.
