= Xu Yuanchong =

Chinese translator (1921–2021)

- 许渊冲
- Born: 18 April 1921; Nanchang County, Jiangxi, Republic of China
- Died: 17 June 2021 (aged 100); Beijing, People's Republic of China
- Education: National Southwestern Associated University; University of Paris
- Occupations: Translator, Professor, Scholar
- Spouse: Zhao Jun
- Children: Xu Ming
- Writing career
- Language: Chinese, English, French
- Period: 1948 - 2021
- Genres: Novel, poetry
- Notable work: The Red and the Black

Xu Yuanchong (simplified Chinese: 许渊冲; traditional Chinese: 許淵沖; pinyin: Xǔ Yuānchōng; 18 April 1921 – 17 June 2021) was a Chinese translator, best known for translating Chinese ancient poems into English and French. He was a professor at Peking University since 1983.

== Early career ==
Xu Yuanchong was born in Nanchang County (now Nanchang), Jiangxi. His mother, who was well educated and good at painting, had great impact on Xu in his pursuit of beauty and literature. His uncle Xiong Shiyi was a translator, who translated the play Wang Baochuan and Xue Pinggui into English, which was a hit in the UK. Xiong's achievement gave Xu a strong interest in learning English. When studying at the Provincial Nanchang No. 2 High School, he excelled in English. In 1938 he was admitted to the Department of Foreign Languages, National Southwest Associated University. In 1939, as a freshman, he translated his first work, Lin Huiyin's poem "Do not throw away" into English, which was published in the "Literary Translation News" (文学翻译报).

== Style ==
His translation style is characterized by favouring domesticating translation. Xu introduced the Creation for Loss and the three beauties-concept to translation theory: the idea that a translation should be as beautiful as the original in three ways:

- semantically (the -deeper- meaning)
- phonologically (the style like rhyme and rhythm)
- logically (amongst others: length)

According to Gao, "he advocates that the versions of poems should combine visual and aural beauties together, and they should reproduce the fusion of pictorial composition and musical arrangement."

== Achievements ==
His 30 Poetries were selected as teaching materials by foreign universities. After reading his English translation "Selected Poems of Li Bai" (1987), Qian Zhongshu said: If you live in the same age with Li Bai, you'll become good friends. The British Press, "Romance of The Western Bower", which is thought as great as "Romeo and Juliet" in terms of artistic and attractiveness. British publishing company Penguin has published Xu Yuanchong's "300 China's immortal poems" (1994), which was launched in Britain, USA, Canada, Australia and other countries. That's the first time that the publishing company published a Chinese translation. Apart from translating the classical Chinese poetry into foreign languages, Xu Yuanchong also translated many of the British and French classics into Chinese. In his seventies, he was still involved in translating Proust's masterpiece "Remembrance of Things Past" (1990) and translated Flaubert's "Madame Bovary" (1992), Stendhal's "Red" (1993). At the age of 78 years, Xu also published a voluminous long masterpiece, the translation of Romain Rolland's "John Kristof" (1999). Xu was awarded the "Lifetime achievements in translation" from the Translators Association of China (TAC) in 2010. On August 2, 2014, at the 20th World Conference of the Federation of International Translators (FIT), FIT conferred The "Aurora Borealis" Prize on Xu Yuanchong, who is the first Chinese winner of the award.

== Works ==
- My Most Beloved: Tang & Song Verses
- Selected Poems and Pictures of Song Dynasty
- Laws Divine and Human and Pictures of Deities
- Gems of Classical Chinese Poetry
- Romance of The Western Bower
- Classic of Poetry (《诗经》)
- Chu Ci (Qu Yuan) (《楚辞》)
- Tao Te Ching (Laozi) (《道德经》)
- Analects (Kongzi) (《论语》)
- The Story of the Western Wing (Wang Shifu) (《西厢记》)
- The Peony Pavilion (Tang Xianzu) (《牡丹亭》)
- The Palace of Eternal Life (Hong Sheng) (《长生殿》)
- The Peach Blossom Fan (Kong Shangren) (《桃花扇》)
- Poetry of Li Bai (Li Bai) (《李白诗选》)
- Three Hundred Tang Poems (Sun Zhu) (《唐诗三百首》)
- One Hundred Song Poems (《宋词一百首》)
- Poetry of Mao Zedong (Mao Zedong) (毛泽东诗词集)
- The Red and the Black (Stendhal) (《红与黑》)
- Jean-Christophe (Romain Rolland) (《约翰·克里斯托夫》)
- Madame Bovary (Gustave Flaubert) (《包法利夫人》)
- In Search of Lost Time (Marcel Proust) (《追忆逝水年华》)

== Awards ==
- Chinese Translation Association - Competent Translator (2004)
- Chinese translation Culture Lifetime Achievement Award (2010)

== Personal life ==
Xu married Zhao Jun (照君) in 1959 in Beijing, they have a son, Xu Ming (许明), also a translator. His wife died in 2018, aged 85.

He turned 100 on 18 April 2021 and died just under two months later, on 17 June in Beijing.
