= The Palace of Eternal Life =

Play written by Hong Sheng

- A printed version of the play The Palace of Eternal Life from the Kangxi period
- Written by: Hong Sheng

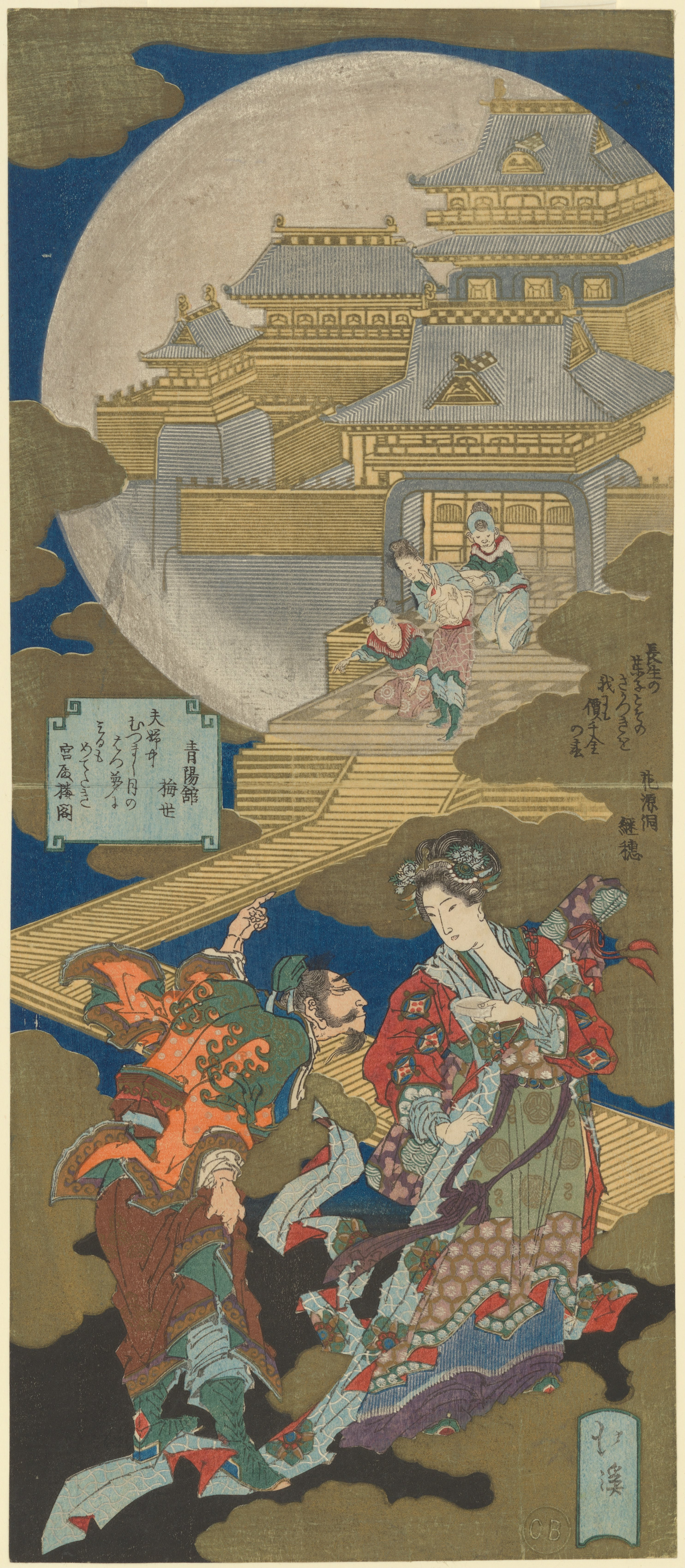
Surimono by Totoya Hokkei with the scenes from The Palace of Eternal Life. Japan, 1831. Chester Beatty Library

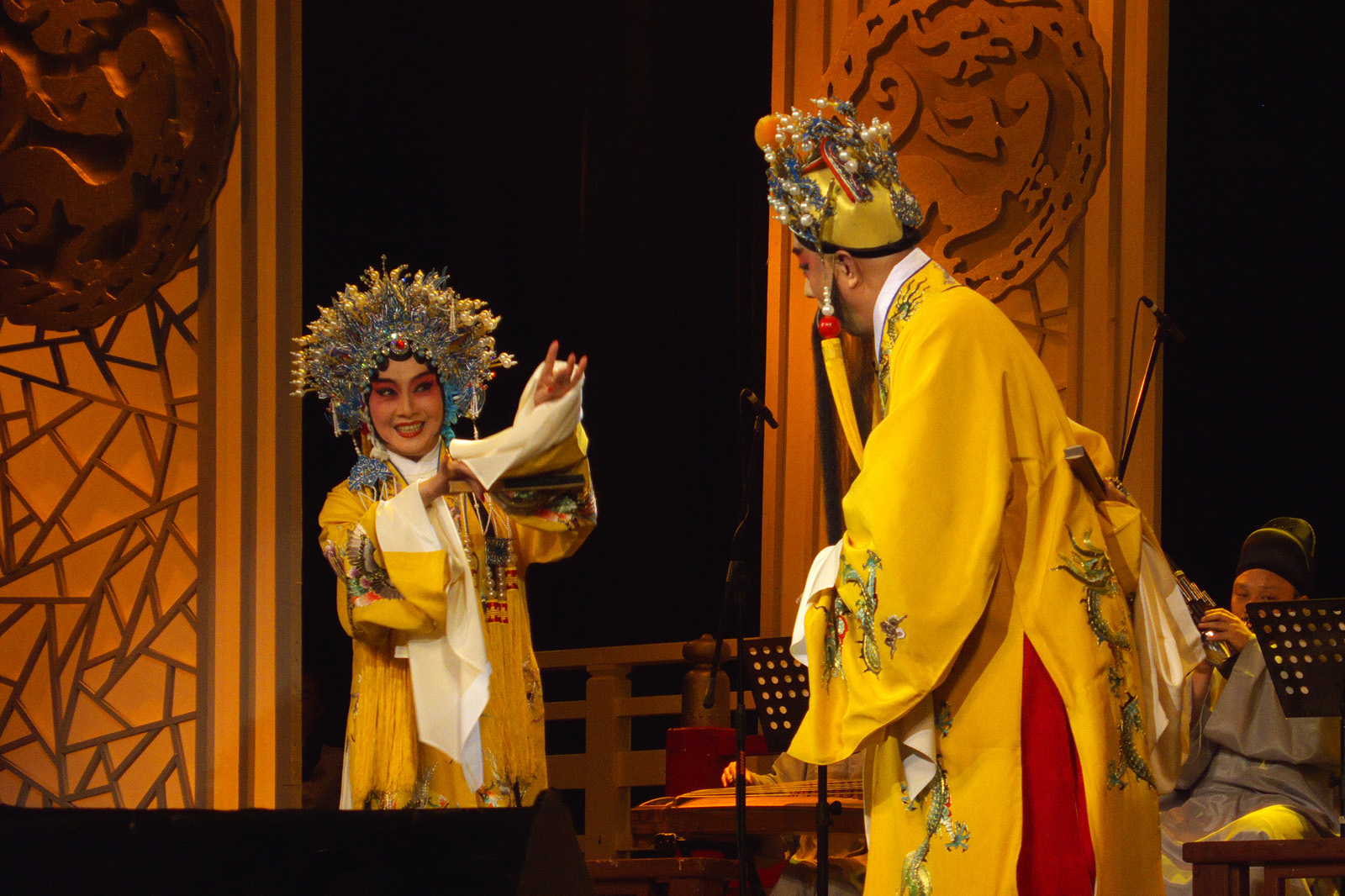
The Palace of Eternal Life in Kunqu

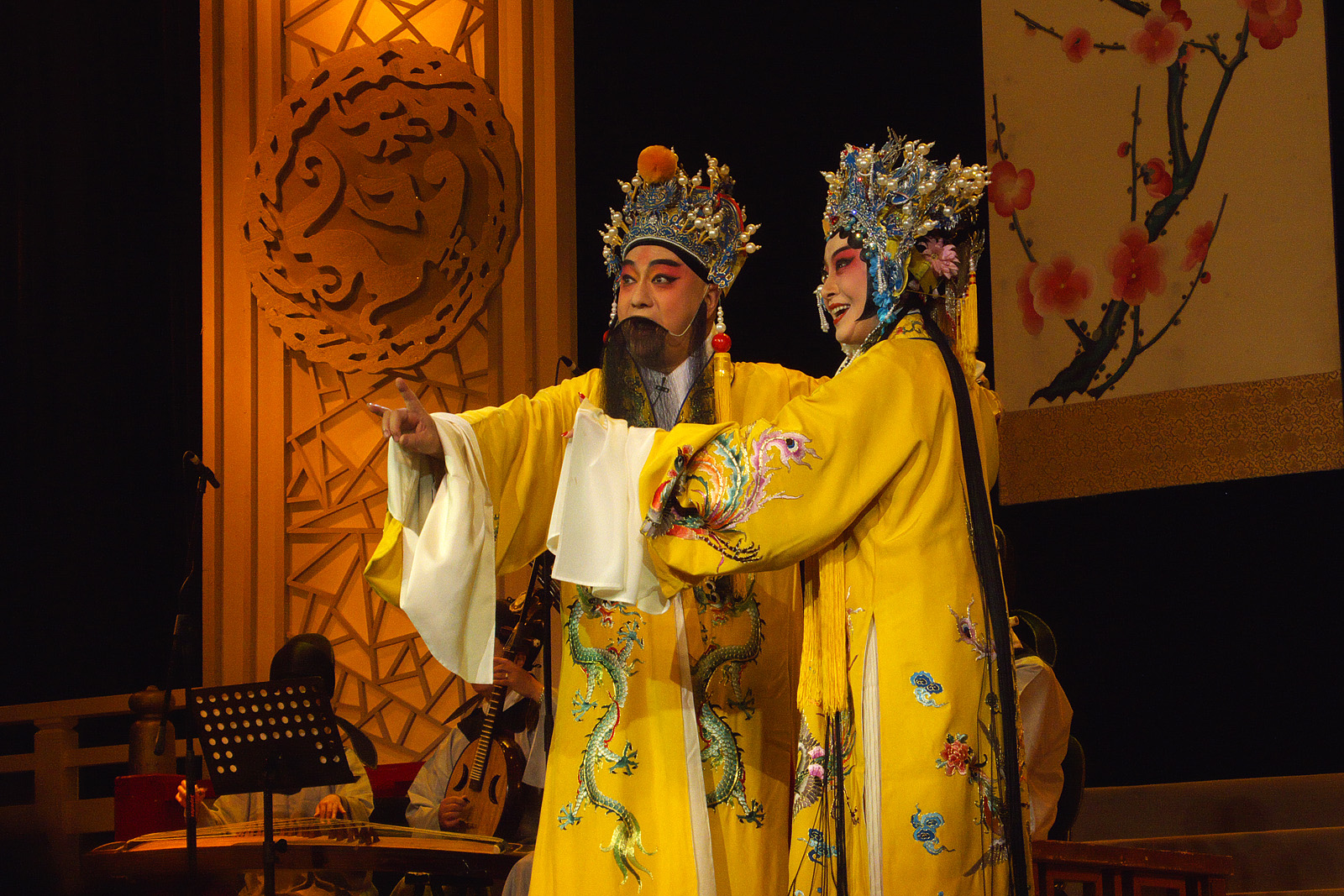
The Palace of Eternal Life in Kunqu

The Palace of Eternal Life (traditional Chinese: 長生殿; simplified Chinese: 长生殿; pinyin: Chángshēng diàn; Wade–Giles: Ch'ang-sheng tian), also translated as The Palace of Eternal Youth, is a play written by Hong Sheng (洪昇/洪升) in the Qing dynasty. He absorbed certain material from the long narrative poem The Song of Everlasting Sorrow written by Bai Juyi and the zaju Rain on the Paulownia Tree (梧桐雨) written by Bai Renfu. The Palace of Eternal Life is acclaimed as one of China's "Four Great Classical Dramas", along with The Peony Pavilion, The Peach Blossom Fan and Romance of the Western Chamber. The performance is focused on the everlasting love story of Emperor Xuanzong of Tang and his favorite consort Yang Guifei.

This story has been translated into English and published by the Foreign Languages Press.

== Author ==
Hong Sheng, one of the period's most famous playwrights and poets, was born in 1645 in a shack outside Hangzhou City in the Qing Dynasty. He graduated from the Imperial Academy in 1668 and then returned home the following year. At the age of 18, he began to write Incense Pavilion (沉香庭), which was later renamed and known as Dance Seduction (霓裳舞). Finally, the old drama of Dance Seduction was successfully rewritten as The Palace of Eternal Life after being revised several times when he was 27, which became a masterpiece afterwards and was widely played. In the year of 1704, on his way back from Nanjing to Hangzhou, Hong Sheng accidentally fell into the river when drinking wine on a boat and died by drowning in Wuzhen.

Equated with Kong Shangren as an influential Qing Dynasty playwright, Hong historicized a traditional love theme and examined how love and politics become entwined.

== Background ==
Hong Sheng lived at the beginning of the Qing dynasty, shortly after the Manchu conquest of the Ming dynasty. He belonged to the old established literary class. His wife was a musician and a woman of extensive literary education, and was the granddaughter of a prime minister under the Ming. His own attitude toward the conquerors was less than cordial. His chief play contains political overtones that were interpreted as disloyal to the Manchu regime, with the result that he was expelled from the Imperial Academy and a large number of his associates were dismissed from their government posts. he left the court in an impoverished condition, returning to his home in the south.

The ruling classes of Qing carried out policies in which evoked strong opposition to intellectuals. Hong Sheng was also highly disappointed with the imperial court. Despite the play's veiled references to the turbulent early Qing period, the Kangxi Emperor highly praised The Palace of Eternal Life when it was performed in Beijing in 1689. However Hong was later imprisoned for attending a performance of it during a period of national mourning, but the play remained extremely popular.

== Plot ==
Palace of Eternal Life is a chuanqi play in fifty acts. The play recounts the love story of Emperor Xuanzong of Tang and his favorite consort, Yang Guifei. Though based on a large body of earlier literature and legend, it is unique in its overall form and lyric exposition.

When Lady Yang becomes the Emperor's favorite consort, he gives her as love tokens a gold hairpin and a casket adorned with gold-leaf flowers. Her older brother Yang Guozhong becomes Chancellor of the Right. Banished once for a fit of jealousy, she regains favor by sending the Emperor her shorn locks as a token of her love. A frontier general, An Lushan, is sent to the capital for an offense, but Yang Guozhong obtains a pardon for him, and he wins a promotion and a princely title for himself. A military man, Guo Ziyi, who has come to the capital to receive an appointment, witnesses from a wine house window the extravagant pomp and splendor enjoyed by the Yang family and An Lushan. A prophetic verse on the wine-house wall foretells doom. Guo is appointed a powerful military commissioner and resolves one day to repay his debt to the imperial court in deeds.

Chang E, the Moon Fairy, wishing to pass on the beautiful music of the Rainbow-skirt Feather-jacket Dance to mortals, summons Lady Yang's soul to her in a dream and teaches it to her. At her birthday banquet in the Palace of Eternal Life, Lady Yang later performs the beautiful dance for the emperor.

After challenging the power of Yang Guozhong, An Lushan is exiled from the capital by the Emperor. He stirs up a rebellion, and Guo Ziyi trains his troops to counter the imminent rising. Oblivious of this situation, Emperor Xuanzong and Lady Yang bathe together in a warm spring and on the seventh of the seventh month, loves' night, make a sacrifice to the Herd Boy and Spinning Damsel star gods, vowing eternal love for each other. When An's forces menace the capital, Xuanzong departs with his entourage toward the relative safety of Sichuan. On the way, at Mawei mail halt, his mutinous troops, blaming the Yangs for their plight, kill Yang Guozhong and demand Lady Yang's death. Helpless, Xuanzong allows her to hang herself, and she is provisionally buried there. An Lushan usurps the imperial throne, and takes over the capital. Xuanzong, grieving for Lady Yang, on reaching Sichuan places a portrait of her in a temple and worships and weeps before it. Meanwhile, moved by the plight of Lady Yang's forlorn soul, the Spinning Damsel persuades the Jade Emperor of Heaven to permit Lady Yang to become an immortal in the paradise of Penglai. She also gives Lady Yang liquid jade and liquid gold to pour on her corpse, thereby reuniting body and soul.

Imperial power is transferred to Emperor Suzong, Xuanzong's son, who sends Guo Ziyi to quell the rebellion. Guo succeeds and the two Emperors head back to the capital. When he passes through Mawei, Xuanzong can find no trace of Lady Yang's body—only her perfume sachet. Back in the capital, he dreams that Lady Yang has sent for him and afterward commands the Taoist necromancer You Tong to seek out lady Yang's soul. Aided by the Spinning Damsel, the Taoist reaches Penglai, where Lady Yang gives him half the gold hairpin and part of the casket to take to Xuanzong as tokens of renewed love. On the appointed date, You Tong sets up a fairy bridge to the Moon palace and sends Xuanzong alone on it to the moon. There the two lovers are blissfully reunited, match the halves of the hairpin and the casket, and thanks to the Spinning Damsel's efforts are commanded by the Jade Emperor to dwell forever as man and wife in paradise.

== Significance ==
The writing of the play has been praised in terms of both the sung and spoken passages. Much of the play's poetry is indebted to one of the most celebrated of Chinese narrative poems, Bai Juyi's The Song of Everlasting Sorrow. The Heroine's supernatural proficiency in song and dance gives occasion for the large number of musical and dance scenes, which are artfully balanced by vigorous political episodes. The theme of purgation is admirably treated as an essential part of the story's development, both in the purgation of the emperor's devotion to luxury and in the gradations by which Yang's ghost rises from its initial misery to celestial beatitude. Long as it is, the play moves smoothly and rapidly. It surprisingly combines frank political realism with metaphysics, Confucian ideals of state with Taoistic ideals of the soul, thus well-earning its place among the world's major dramas.

== Performances ==
After the finalization of the play, the Ju He Theatre Troupe of Beijing's performance of the work caused a sensation in the capital, and was even recommended by the Kangxi Emperor. Later on, the Ju He Theatre Troupe became renowned of their repertoire and they were highly successful. There were two major performances in 1704. Zhang Yunwing invited Hong Sheng to watch the performances of the play at his residence, as did Cao Yin, unfortunately, on his way home, Hong Sheng, who was drunk, fell into a river and drowned.

In the Republican era, the performances of the play were mainly done by professional troupes. In the early periods of the founding of the People's Republic, China, the performances of the play were based on behalf of the Zhejiang Kunqu Theatre Company and the Jiangsu Kunqu Opera Troupe. Sukun Troupe of Jiangsu Province also had productions of the play in Suzhou in 1958. The Zhejiang Kunqu Opera Troupe re-finished the play in 1984 and premiered on October 2 in the Victory Theater in Hangzhou.

In the 1980s, there were versions of the play made in the Beijing Cultural Palace of Nationalities and by the Shanghai Kun Opera Company. On November 19 and 20, 2000, Shanghai Kunqu Company’s production of the play premiered in the Luwan District's Shanghai White Magnolia Theatre. In 2002, Northern Kunqu Theater held two shows in Beijing's Chang'an Grand Theater, which was a joint production of Jiangsu Province Suzhou Kunqu Opera Theatre and many other units, and it also debut in Taipei in February 2004. In August 2004, the Shanghai Kun Opera Company debut an unplugged version at the Luting Concert Hall, and their new production of the play debut in the Shanghai Lyceum Theatre on May 29, 2007.

== Translations ==
In 1955 the Foreign Languages Press of Beijing published an English translation. Cyril Birch, a collaborator on the English translation of The Peach Blossom Fan, wrote that the 1955 translation of The Palace of Eternal Life was "relatively complete" and "prosaic and flat".
