= Yang Mei =

Chinese Ming Dynasty singer and actress

Yang Mei (Chinese: 楊美; pinyin: Yáng Měi, 1560s – c. 1601) was a Chinese courtesan of the Ming dynasty who also performed kunqu on stage. She was very close to the writer Mei Dingzuo.

== Relationships ==
Her private quarter in Nanjing was called the Flowing Waves Pavilion (Liubo guan 流波館), and the Jinling Poetry Society often gathered there. Mei Dingzuo wrote at least eight poems that mentioned the name "Flowing Waves" either in its title or its text. Their contents suggest an intimate relationship between him and Yang. Several of the poems mention another friend Wu Jiadeng (吳稼竳) who was present in the gatherings. Wu wrote a poem in her memory after her death. Zang Maoxun and Wu Zhao (吳兆) also wrote about some of the gatherings at the Flowing Waves Pavilion.

== Acting ==
The Flowing Waves Pavilion often featured theatre performances. Yang Mei was considered a dedicated actress: when she played Ru Ji in Stealing the Seal (竊符), she would prostrate herself on the cold floor for a long time even on snowy days. The theatre critic Pan Zhiheng once ranked Yang Mei the highest among seven prominent courtesan-actresses:

Skill is the strong point of Jiang Liu (蔣六) and Wang Jie (王節), but intelligence is their weak point. Yu Si (宇四) and Gu Yun (顧筠) have intelligence, but lack style. Gu San (顧三) and Chen Qi (陳七) excel in style, but come short in skill. The only one who claims all three of these credits is Yang Mei [who] has not yet gained complete control of leading acting.

According to Pan, Yu Si once violated her family's midnight curfew — she snuck out of the house — just to watch Yang Mei perform.
