= Chuanqi (theatre) =

Form of Chinese opera

- Traditional Chinese: 傳奇
- Simplified Chinese: 传奇
Transcriptions
Standard Mandarin
- Hanyu Pinyin: Chuánqí
- Wade–Giles: Chʻuan^{2}-chʻi^{2}
- IPA: [ʈʂʰwǎŋ.tɕʰǐ]

Chuanqi (traditional Chinese: 傳奇; simplified Chinese: 传奇) is a form of Chinese opera popular in the Ming dynasty (1368–1644) and early Qing dynasty (1644–1912). It emerged in the mid-Ming dynasty from the older form of nanxi. As it spread throughout the empire, it absorbed regional music styles and topolects and eventually evolved into different local genres, among them kunqu. Of the 2,000 plus titles recorded in history, over 600 chuanqi plays are extant and are still performed today, including The Peony Pavilion by Tang Xianzu, The Palace of Eternal Life by Hong Sheng, and The Peach Blossom Fan by Kong Shangren.

This tradition of theatre has the same name Chuanqi (传奇; 傳奇) as the tradition of short story and novella, Chuanqi, in Tang dynasty, because at the beginning the plots of the Chuanqi theatre often originated from the Chuanqi stories.

== Music ==
Whereas its precursor nanxi predominantly used southern Chinese tunes, which were pentatonic, melismatic, slow and soft, chuanqi widely incorporated northern tunes which were heptatonic, syllabic, fast and forceful. This process had begun in the Yuan dynasty (1271–1368), which reunified northern China (the former Jin dynasty (1115–1234)) and southern China (the former Southern Song dynasty (1127–1279)), as nanxi increasingly absorbed the northern tunes of zaju, a northern Chinese opera form. After chuanqi came into being in the middle of the Ming dynasty, its popularity spread throughout the various areas of China, each with its distinct traditional musical style and topolect. Over time, four major sub-genres (or "singing styles"; Chinese: 唱腔; pinyin: chàngqiāng) were recognized: haiyanqiang ("Haiyan style"), yuyaoqiang ("Yuyao style"), yiyangqiang ("Yiyang style"), and kunshanqiang ("Kunshan style", later known as kunqu). Haiyanqiang and yuyaoqiang did not last long; yiyangqiang evolved into a large variety of regional forms and disappeared as a genre in the process; while kunqu became the standard genre in the Qing dynasty.

== Role types ==
Chuanqi used 12 major role types:

- Sheng: male lead
- Xiaosheng: young male
- Dan: female lead
- Laodan: old female
- Xiaodan (小旦): young female
- Chou: clown
- Jing: comic
- Zhongjing (中淨): secondary comic
- Mo (末): Secondary male
- Wai (外): Secondary female
- Tie (貼): Secondary young female
- Za (雜): Extra

== Play structure ==
Unlike nanxi plays, chuanqi plays are divided into chu (齣), or acts, each with a subtitle. The four-line poem which appears before the prologue in nanxi is placed at the end of the first chu in chuanqi.
