= Ruan Dacheng =

- 阮大鋮

Grand Secretariat of the Eastern Hall
- In office 1645
- Monarch: Zhu Yousong

Minister of War
- In office 1645
- Monarch: Zhu Yousong
- Preceded by: Lian Guoshi
- Succeeded by: Zhang Kentang

Minister of War in Southern Capital
- In office 1645
- Monarch: Zhu Yousong
- Preceded by: Lian Guoshi
- Succeeded by: Shao Fuzhong

Personal details
- Born: 1587 Tongcheng, Ming China
- Died: 1646 (aged 58–59) Jiangshan, Qing China
- Occupation: dramatist, poet, politician

Ruan Dacheng
- Traditional Chinese: 阮大鋮
- Simplified Chinese: 阮大铖
Transcriptions
Standard Mandarin
- Hanyu Pinyin: Ruǎn Dàchéng
- Wade–Giles: Juan Ta-Ch'eng

Ruan Dacheng (c. 1587–1646) was a Chinese dramatist, poet and official of the Ming dynasty and the Southern Ming dynasty. His daughter, Ruan Lizhen, was also a dramatist.

Ruan grew up in Huaining County, Anqing. He became a jinshi in 1616 and began a career as an official. Ruan aligned himself with the faction of the eunuch Wei Zhongxian and, after Wei fell from favour and committed suicide, was removed from office. He then retired to live as a hermit and it is believed that most of his literary production was undertaken during this time.

In 1644, after the fall of Beijing to the Qing dynasty, he became an official of the Southern Ming through the influence of his close friend Ma Shiying. In 1645, he surrendered to the Qing dynasty.

After his death, he was reviled as a traitor and he is a villain in Kong Shangren's The Peach Blossom Fan, a 1699 musical play.

He was a patron of the garden designer Ji Cheng.
