= Ye Xiaoluan =

Chinese poet (1616–1632)

Ye Xiaoluan (Chinese: 葉小鸞; 1616–1632) was a Chinese teenage poet prodigy from the Ming dynasty, born near Lake Fen in Wujiang county, in Jiangsu province. She was the third daughter of Ye Shaoyuan (1589–1648) a scholar, and Shen Yixiu (1590–1635) a poet, editor and teacher. Her older sister, Ye Wanwan (1610–1632) was also a poet.

== Short life ==
Xiaoluan grew up in the household of her uncle, Shen Junyong, her mother's younger brother, and his partner Zhang Qianqian, who was Shen Yixiu's closest friend. They raised Xiaoluan as their own for nine years. Qianqian, Xiaoluan's adoptive mother and aunt, introduced poetry to Xiaoluan. Xiaoluan returned to her natal home after the death of Qianqian, who was thirty-four at the time. Xiaoluan remembered her adoptive parents fondly in her poetry. Xiaoluan's father, Ye Shaoyuan, took her, when she was eleven years old, to Nanjing to visit Taoye Ford, the former residence of courtesan Xue Susu.

Ye Xiaoluan died at the age of seventeen, five days before her wedding, following a short period of illness. In the final year of her life her poetry had many premonitions of her coming death.

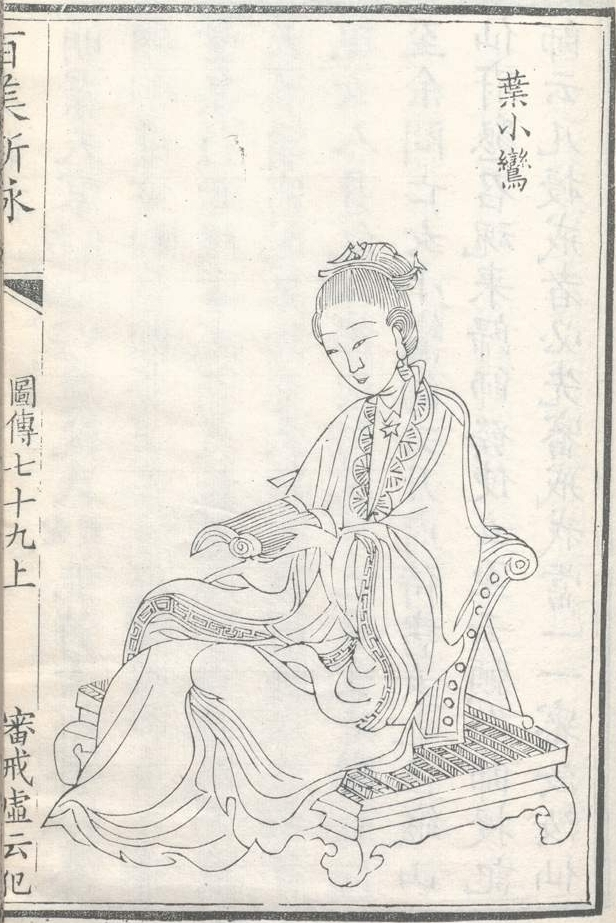
Ye Xiaoluan - Baimei xinyong

== Poetry prodigy ==
"In dreams there are mountains as refuge from the world,
When awake I find no wine to drown my sorrow.
In life freedom and leisure are the hardest to come by."

Ye Shaoyuan, promoted Xiaoluan as a child prodigy after her death, editing and adding annotations to her work before publishing her poetry. She was compared to literary greats such as Han Yu (768-824) and Liu Zongyuan, thus creating an image of the talented teenage daughter, to be found in her poem 'Morning Make-up on a Day in Spring:'
"Mirror in hand, the morning breeze feels crisp,
How can eyebrows as delicate as moths be achieved by drawing?
The very moment I finish clipping flowers in my hair,
Beyond the willow tree I hear the oriole sing."

By juxtaposing the beauty's eyebrows with the willow tree, she reveals a symbol of femininity, beauty and passion seen in Tang poet Bai Juyi's line on Yang Guifei whose 'eyebrows resemble willow trees.' Deeper than this reference, Ye Xiaoluan draws on the hero and lover from in The Peony Pavilion, a romantic play written by Tang Xianzu in 1598.

In the play Lui Mengmei, the hero, appears in Du Liniang's dream, holding a willow branch in his hand. Along Shi Zhenlin (1693–1779), a Qing dynasty scholar, writing on Liu Mengmei, describes the willow as representing passion. Mengmei is also called The Lord of Spring, Spring being a reference to the rise of the male (yang) element, standing for sexuality and passion. The oriole at the conclusion signifies one of a pair of lovers, alongside referring to singing girls. Xiaoluan's poem, written when she was eleven years of age, begins with innocence and intimacy of a girl during her morning toilette, but on deeper approaches it goes on to seduction, passion and emotions.

Xiaoluan wrote:
(To the melody of "Sands of Washing Brook": Expressing my Emotions):
"Whenever I try to call out to Heaven, Heaven just seems farther away.
I realise that in this life I will never reach the mountains and streams;
But why have I by nature always felt a Kinship with mists and clouds?
Counting the years on my fingers, I'm startled by their number:
Time emptily floats away and I have no desire for worldly glory:
When can I ride astride a crane to the home of the immortals?"

Over the course of her short life, Xiaoluan found that song lyrics were best suited to her talents. Writing ninety lyrics to thirty six different melodies, she would often write on trees and flowering perennial plants. Her later work would draw on descriptions of the realm of the immortals and visits to them, a common theme in Chinese poetry. Nonetheless, her parents saw this as evidence that their daughter was an immortal that was banished to spend time on earth before inevitably dying young and returning to the celestial realms.

== Immortal poetess ==
Ye Shaoyuan was not unusual in promoting his daughter's literary talent: doing so could facilitate advantageous marital prospects and align the family with contemporary literati culture, given the "cult of emotions" and the fashion for publishing women's writings. Publicly elevating his daughter's reputation represented an exchange of cultural capital, and offered the possibility of financial benefit, potentially extending beyond her lifetime. At the time, the Ye family lived in genteel poverty, and Shaoyuan's editorial work and literary reputation were central to his social positioning, enabling him to participate in the circles of influential men. Xiaoluan's poetic skill, emerging when the symbolic figures of Du Liniang and Xiaoqing were at the height of literary fashion, allowed her father to claim distinction as both the publisher and the editor of her work. The publishing industry of the late Ming dynasty facilitated the increasingly widespread circulation of literary works, including those attributed to Xiaoluan.

Xiaoluan's father solidified her immortal status by using the help of spirit mediums, to communicate with Xiaoluan in the afterlife. She appeared as various domestic goddesses in extensions of her real-life persona and beauty. In 1636, during on of these seance's Xiaoluan would have appeared as a female librarian in the Moon Palace.

Another such seance, in 1642, she would have been a reincarnation of Han scholar-teacher Ban Zhao, who was a model to all latter-day erudite women. Xiaoluan would be remembered as the holder of secular and mystical knowledge, while her poetry collection would be repeatedly be included in multiple anthologies over the years. Women painters treasured her surviving paintings, poets would harmonise with her verses, and people still claim too see her in seances up to the nineteenth century. Having passed away at a young age, Xiaoluan would be transformed into a domestic goddess, through the circulation of her writings, paintings, and in people's imagination.

The fashion of creating literati goddesses continued throughout the Ming dynasty and up to the Qing dynasty, as scholars of that era projected talented women writers who died young as either someone who had ascended to heaven to become immortal, or as a fallen immortal, banished to earth as punishment but predestined to return to the celestial realms. Ye Xiaoluan, and her sister Ye Wanwan, who died a couple of months after Xiaoluan, are among the most famous banished immortals of early modern times in imperial China, having died at seventeen and twenty-two years old. Their parents, Ye Shaoyuan and Shen Yixiu, wrote of their daughters as immortals who had returned to their rightful place.
