= Zang Maoxun =

- Born: 1550; Changxing, Zhejiang, China
- Died: 1620 (aged 69–70)
- Writing career
- Period: Ming Dynasty

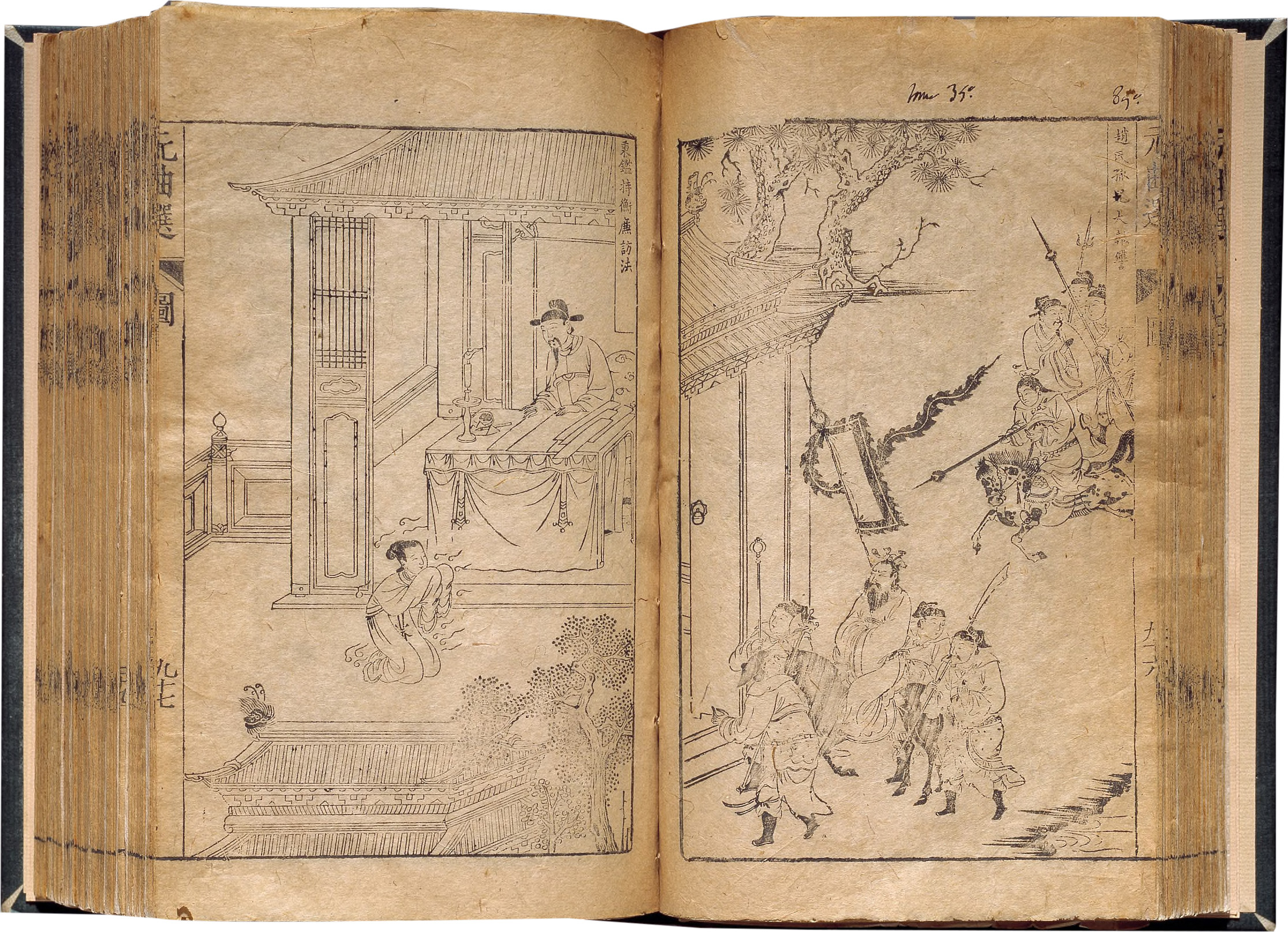
Illustration from the "Selected One Hundred Plays from the Yuan Dynasty" compiled by Zang Maoxun. Xylographic print, 1615-1616. Bibliothèque nationale de France

Zang Maoxun (Chinese: 臧懋循; pinyin: Zāng Màoxún; 1550–1620) was a Ming dynasty Chinese playwright and drama theorist from Changxing, Zhejiang province. His courtesy name was Jinshu (晋叔) and he may also be known by the pseudonym (hao), Guzhu (顾渚). He successfully achieved the rank of Jinshi (presented scholar) in 1580 (the 8th year of Ming Wanli). He was matriculated as a local governmental official in Jingzhou, and was later promoted as an officer in Guozijian (国子监) of Nanjing. He knew the Confucian Five Classics well and was a person uninhibited in speech and behaviour. Zang disdained the feudal ethical code and was dissatisfied with affairs of the state. As often pointed out the political problems in the society in the way of poetry at the moment, he was impeached by the imperial court and dismissed from office in 1585 (the 13th year of Wanli). After returning to his hometown, Zang entertained himself with poetry and remained an intimate association with many men of letters. He collected the missing yuanqu and poems. He also published a lot of books, including Selections of Yuanqu, Selections of poems which granted him lasting fame for posterity.

== Personal life ==
Zang Maoxun was an intelligent child since very young. He could make couplets. with the adults when he was five years old. A precocious child, he was once taken by his father to visit a friend called Xian Jingzhao, Xian wanted to test the child's talent, so he suddenly said the first line of a couplet, “There are five fingers in a hand.” Zang Maoxun thought for a second, then quickly answered: “There are seven orifices in a heart.” Xian Jingzhao was so amazed and impressed by his remarkable talent and said, this child was destined to impress the world with his literary works. When Zang was 19 years old, his father, a two-term magistrate, died. After he had buried his father, he studied hard for the examination.

In 1580, Wanli 8 (万历八年), Zang Maoxun attended the Imperial examination, and was qualified and ranked as Jinshi. He held a government position in Jingzhou in the following year. In 1582 Wanli 10 (万历十年), Zang served as a magistrate in Yiling, which is located in modern-day Yichang County of Hubei province. Later, when he was an officer in Guozijian (国子监) of Nanjing, he maintained a friendly relationship with Tang Xianzu (汤显祖) and Wang Shizhen (王世贞). During this period, Zang always went to suburbs for amusement with his catamites and children, with which many officers of the imperial court were discontented. In 1585 Wanli 13 (万历十三年), at the age of 36, Zang Maoxun was dismissed from office and returned to his hometown Changxing after a homosexual liaison with one of his students.

Living in his hometown, Zang Maoxun entertained himself with poetry and kept a close relationship with many men of letters of that time like Mei Dingzuo (梅鼎祚) and Yuan Zhongdao (袁中道). Famed for his quick wits and elaborate literary style, Zang Maoxun was ranked with Wu Jiadeng (吴家登), Wu Mengyang (吴梦旸) and Mao Wei (茅维) among the Four Scholars of Wuxing, a group of representative literati of Wuxing.

After 50 years old, Zang presented an active state in the field of publishing. He published a great number of literature books, including Selected Plays from the Yuan Dynasty (元曲选), Selections of poems Four dreams of Yumingtang (玉茗堂四梦), Liubosuijin (六博碎金) and so on.

When Zang was 57 years old, he organized a poetry group of Jinling 金陵社集 with over 10 friends. For this reason, he obtained a little fame in the field of poetry of that time.

== Works ==
=== Own works ===
Fubaotang Ji (负苞堂集) is the masterpiece of Zang Maoxun. It is recorded and published by his son Zang Erbing (臧尔炳). According to the postscript of the book, some articles of the initial Fubaotang Ji was lost, so he edited and published the existing ones. In the twenty-fifth chapter of the book of Qianqingtang Bibliography (千顷堂书目) written by Huang Yuji (黄虞稷), it is recorded that the Fubaotang Ji of Zang Maoxun consisted of ten chapters, five of which are selections of his poetry, and four chapters are selections of his articles.

The Fubaotang Ji we see today contains nine chapters. The first four chapters are collections of his articles, and the rest are collections of poetry. The first and second chapters of Fubaotang Ji contain seven memorials to the throne and twenty letters, all written in the style of Pianwen (Chinese: 骈文; pinyin: Piánwén). The proses of Zang Maoxun are included in the third and fourth chapters. His famous proses like "the letter in reply to Yao Shudu" and "the letter to Ou Zhenbo" are in the fourth chapter.

Zang has a great achievement in poetry. Publisher Zang Maoxun (出版家臧懋循) recorded:" Zang's poetry, faces the reality, which has a fresh style." He had a great reputation in the literary field of the Ming Dynasty. Zang Maoxun, Wu Jiading, Wu Mengyang, Mao Wei had the title of "Four Scholars of Wuxing" (吴兴四子) at that time.

=== Works edited ===
Zang Maoxun was one of the most famous poets who were influenced by Yuan dramatists. In ancient Chinese society, the opera was regarded as an unrefined performance for a long time, so he felt his own mission was to select and publish Yuanqu. The Selected Plays from the Yuan Dynasty (元曲选) he had selected and engraved occupies an important position in the history of Chinese literature and opera. He had also published Yumingtangsimeng (玉茗堂四梦), Jiaozhenggubenjingchaiji (校正古本荆钗记), Gaidingtanhuaji (改定昙花记)and so on. The works totalled more than 3 million words.

==== Selected plays from the Yuan Dynasty ====
The main contribution of Zang Maoxun is the Selected One Hundred Plays from the Yuan Dynasty. In addition to his family's rich collection, he gathered rare editions from many other bibliophiles. He borrowed three hundred from Liu Chengxi of Macheng and gathered additional ones from other collectors.

Zang Maoxun poured his money and vigour into this enterprise. He went north to the central plains and south to the Hu and Guang provinces (湖广行省) when he was over sixty years old. He collected all kinds of Yuanqu scattered around the country, and edited them with careful finishing, collating and phonetic notes. Finally, Zang Maoxun published the Selected plays from the Yuan Dynasty in more than 100 Juan in Wanli 43 and 44.

This feat saved for posterity one hundred famous operas, including" Snow in Midsummer " (窦娥冤), "Autumn in the Han Palace" (汉宫秋) and so on.

The scholar Stephen H. West notes that most translations of Yuan drama use the texts edited and "extensively altered" by Zang Maoxun (1550-1620). West writes that Zang rationalized both the language and the format of the plays he edited, rather than the "coarser and more rugged – sometimes ragged – registers of language found in the early commercial editions of Yuan drama."

== References and further reading ==
West, Stephen H. (1991). "A Study in Appropriation: Zang Maoxun's Injustice to Dou E". Journal of the American Oriental Society. 111 (2): 283–302. doi:10.2307/604020. JSTOR 604020.

== See also ==
- Chinese poetry
- Classical Chinese poetry
