= Mei Dingzuo =

Mei Dingzuo (Chinese: 梅鼎祚; pinyin: Méi Dǐngzuò) (1549-1615) was a Chinese writer and playwright. He was described by a contemporary drama reviewer as being "an outstanding and talented descendant of a distinguished family..."

== Life ==
He was born in Xuancheng. Mei's family consisted of academics and owned a large library of their own. Mei was friends with Tang Xianzu, Wang Shizhen, and Wang Daokun. His teacher was Jiang Qifang. Mei collected books. He would meet with his friends to share books they recently acquired. He failed imperial examinations and became a full-time writer. Mei's hired his own workers to create woodblocks for his books. He also published his books himself.

== Legacy ==
Works by Mei are held in the National Central Library.

== Works ==
- Chang ming lü ji (Story of the Longevity Threads)
- Kunlun nu (Kunlun Slave)
- Yu he ji (Story of the Jade Box)
