= The Peony Pavilion =

1598 Chinese play by Tang Xianzu

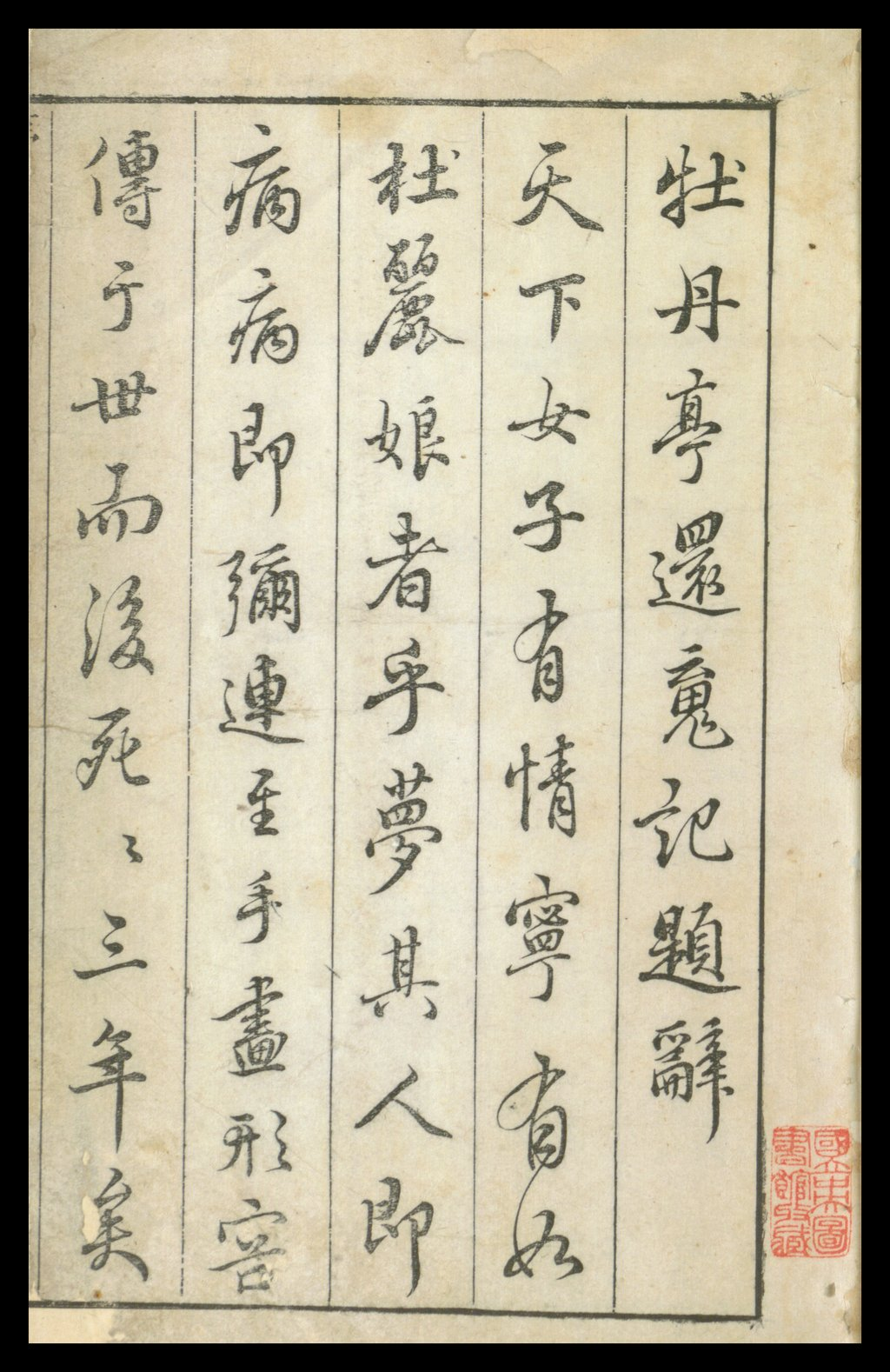
The first page of Tang Xianzu's preface to The Peony Pavilion (also known as The Return of the Soul at the Peony Pavilion)

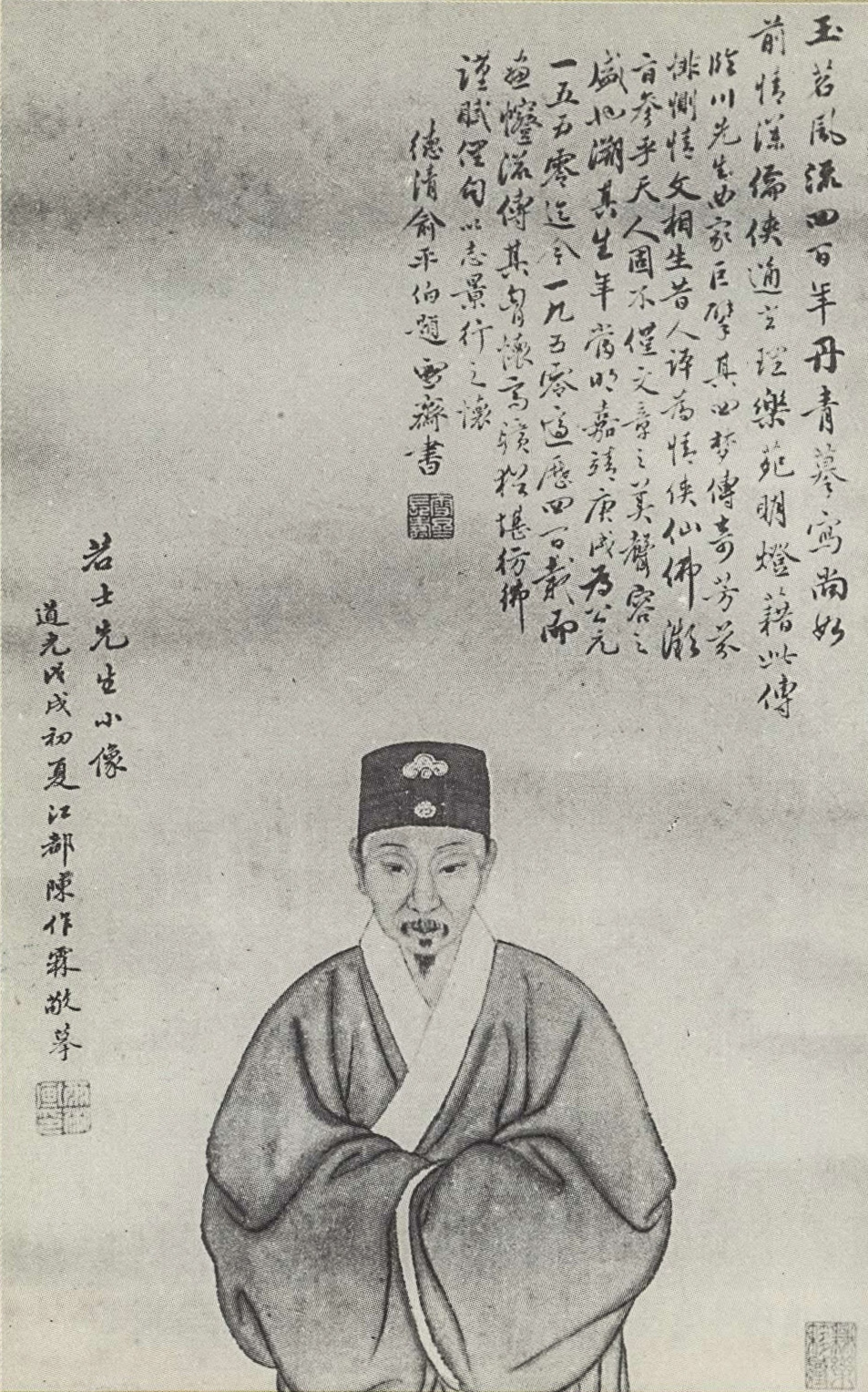
Portrait of the playwright, Tang Xianzu

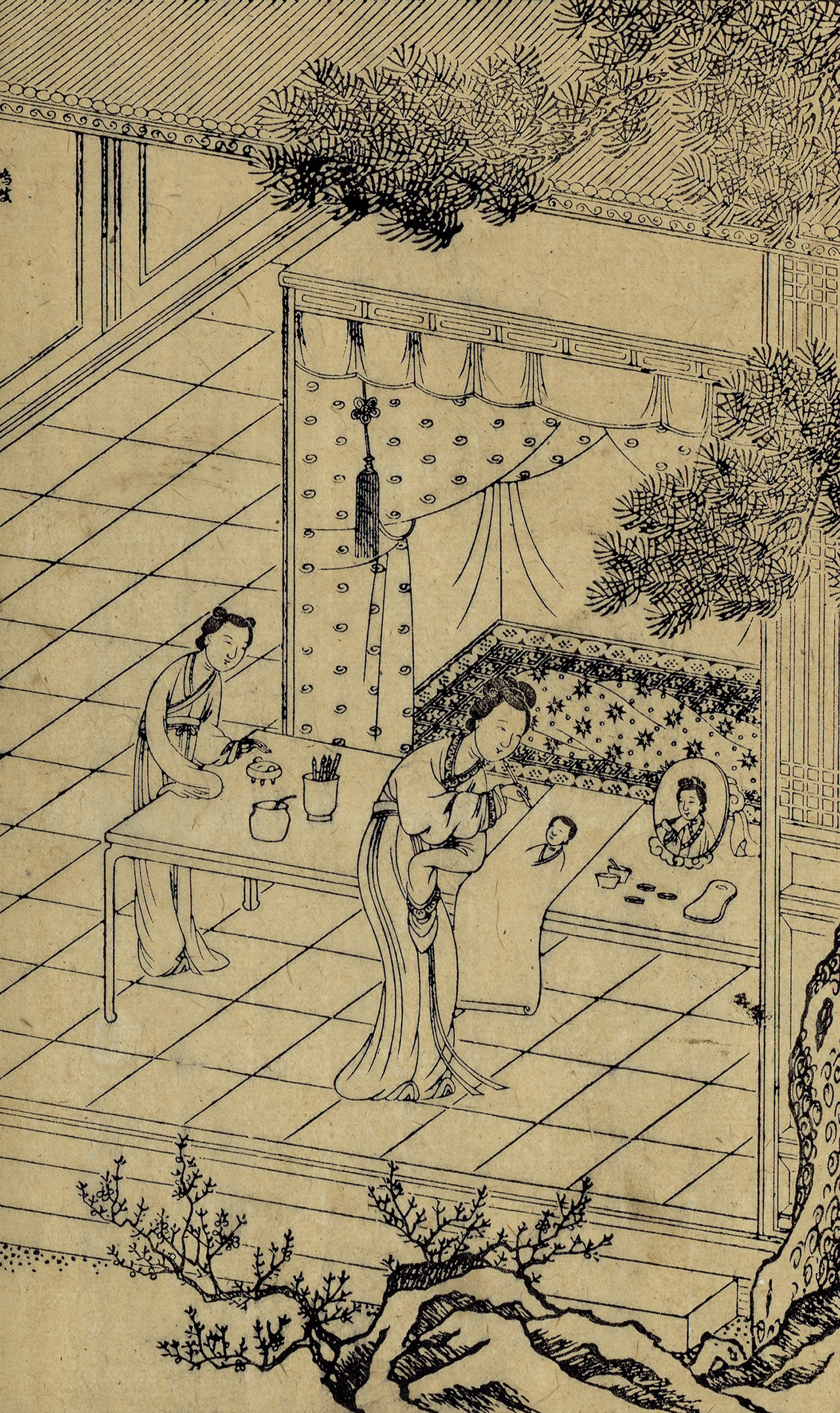
Illustration of Du Liniang drawing her self-portrait, from a Jiuwotang Hall imprint of The Peony Pavilion, Ming dynasty

The Peony Pavilion (Chinese: 牡丹亭; pinyin: Mǔdān tíng; Wade–Giles: Mu-tan t'ing), also named The Return of Soul at the Peony Pavilion, is a romantic tragicomedy play written by dramatist Tang Xianzu in 1598. The plot was drawn from the short story Du Liniang Revives For Love and depicts a love story between Du Liniang and Liu Mengmei that overcomes all odds. Tang's play diverges from the short story in that it integrates elements of the Ming dynasty, despite being set in the Southern Song.

The play was originally written for staging as Kunqu opera, one of the genres of traditional Chinese theatre arts. It was first performed in 1598 at the Pavilion of Prince Teng. Its author, Tang Xianzu, was one of the greatest dramatists and writers of the Ming dynasty, and The Peony Pavilion can be regarded as the most successful masterpiece of his life. It is also one of the dramas in Tang's famous dramatic collection Linchuan si meng ("The Four Dreams in the Jade Tea Hall"), along with Zichai Ji ("The Purple Hairpin"), Nanke Ji ("A Dream Under the Southern Bough") and Handan Ji ("The Handan Dream"). Both the play and its dramatist get a high reputation on Chinese and international stages, and the study of Tang Xianzu has become a popular subject today.

The play has a total of 55 scenes, which can run for more than 22 hours on stage.

== Synopsis ==
The preface of the play contains the following famous lines (as translated by Cyril Birch):

"Love is of source unknown, yet it grows ever deeper. The living may die of it, by its power the dead live again. Love is not love at its fullest if one who lives is unwilling to die for it, or if it cannot restore to life one who has so died."

The story is set in the last days of the Southern Song dynasty. The stage performances traditionally center on the romance between Du Liniang and Liu Mengmei, although the original text also contained subplots pertaining to the falling Song dynasty's defense against the aggression of the Jin dynasty. The romantic theme goes along the following outline.

On a fine spring day, her maid persuades Miss Du Liniang, the sixteen-year-old daughter of a senior official, Du Bao, to take a stroll in the garden, where she falls asleep and has a dream. In that fateful dream, Liniang encounters a young scholar (identified later in the play as Liu Mengmei, whom in real life she has never met). Liu Mengmei's bold advances ignite a passionate love affair between the two that flourishes rapidly. A flower petal that drops on Liniang startles her from the romantic dream (according to her soliloquy in a later act, "Retracting the Dream"). However, Liniang cannot get the oneiric love affair out of her mind since and her lovesickness quickly wastes her away. Unable to recover from her fixation, Liniang dies shortly after.

The president of the underworld adjudicates that marriage between Du Liniang and Liu Mengmei is predestined and Liniang ought to return to the earthly world. Liniang subsequently appears to Liu Mengmei, who now inhabits the garden where Du Liniang had her fatal dream, in his various dreams. Recognizing that Du Bao's deceased daughter is the girl who appears in his dreams, Liu agrees to exhume Liniang's body upon her request and bring her back to life. Liu Mengmei then visits Du Bao to inform him of his daughter's resurrection as well as their relationship. The disbelieving and furious Du Bao throws Liu Mengmei into prison for being a grave robber and an impostor.

The ending of the story follows the formula for many popular Chinese dramas. Liu Mengmei narrowly escapes death by torture thanks to the arrival of the results of the imperial examination in which Liu has proved himself to be of great talent and value. The emperor pardons and delivers rewards to all.

In the first scene, there is a four-sentence introductory speech succinctly summarizing the main storyline:

"Du Liniang draws a portrait true to life;

Chen Zuiliang brings about the peace once more;

Liu Mengmei meets his resurrected wife;

Du Bao gives tortures to his son-in-law."

== Scenes ==
There are total of fifty-five scenes in the play. This is the version translated by Zhang Guangqian. Scenes in boldface are those usually adapted/performed onstage.

1. The Prologue

4. The Pedant's Complaint

7. The Family School

10. **A Surprising Dream**

13. Setting Out

16. An Inquiry

19. A Female Bandit

22. En Route

25. Recalling the Daughter

28. **Secret Rendezvous**

31. War Preparations

34. The Prescription

37. The Shocked Pedant

40. The Humpback Espier

43. Defending Huai'an

46. Outwitting the Bandits

49. Lodging by River Huai

52. Searching for the Zhuangyuan

55. A Decreed Reunion

2. Ambitious Thoughts

5. Engaging a Tutor

8. Supervising Agriculture

11. King Warning

14. **Drawing a Self-portrait**

17. The Taoist Nun

20. Untimely Death

23. **The Nether Judge**

26. Admiring the Portrait

29. Suspicious Aroused

32. **A Vow**

35. **Resurrection**

38. Planning an Attack

41. Delayed for the Examination

44. Filial Concern

47. The End of the Siege

50. An Uninvited Guest

53. Under Torture

3. Disciplining the Daughter

6. A Dismal View

9. Clearing the Garden

12. **Retracing the Dream**

15. Invaders

18. The Diagnoses

21. Meeting the Envoy

24. **Discovering the Portrait**

27. The Wandering Soul

30. Interrupting the Amour

33. Confiding the Scheme

36. **Abscondence of the Newlyweds**

39. Reaching Lin'an

42. Transferring on Huai'an

45. The Two Defrauders

48. A Reunion with the Mother

51. The Proclamation of the Results

54. The Happy Tidings

== Textual and critical legacy ==
Pages from the "Three Wives' Commentary" edition of The Peony Pavilion

Since its publication in the late 16th century, The Peony Pavilion has attracted an extraordinary amount of scholarly and critical attention, at a previously unmatched level for a Chinese drama, rivalling or even surpassing the critical attention previous writers had paid to zaju plays of the Yuan dynasty and other Ming chuanqi plays. The play is seen as one of the major literary works that is representative of the "cult of qing" philosophical movement of the 16th and 17th centuries.

Generations of literati writers and women, have annotated, debated, and published critical commentaries on The Peony Pavilion, including Shen Jing (1553–1610), Zang Maoxun (1550–1620), Yuan Hongdao (1568–1610), Wang Siren (1574–1646), Feng Xiaoqing (（1594–1612, female), Ye Xiaoluan (1616–1632, female), Hong Sheng (1645–1704), Mao Qiling (1623–1716) and Mao Xianshu (1620–1688).

One of the most famous is a late 17th-century edition annotated and commented sequentially by the three wives/beloved of the scholar Wu Ren (courtesy name Wu Wushan, born 1647), and it is called "The Three Wives' Commentary on The Peony Pavilion" (吳吳山三婦合評牡丹亭還魂記). This "Three Wives' Commentary" edition began by Chen Tong, a gifted female poet who was betrothed to a young Wu Wushan when he was just 17-18, and she began annotating The Peony Pavilion, however, she fell ill and died young in 1665 before she could marry Wu or finish her commentary. After her death, her manuscripts was preserved. Tan Ze, another female writer, marries Wu Wushan and became his first wife, and she discovered Chen Tong’s surviving notes and drafts, and took up to continue the work, and she died in 1674 after completing only part of the commentary. And after Tan Ze's death, Wu married Qian Yi, and Qian synthesized both Chen Tong and Tan Ze's notes and manuscripts, and prepared the complete edition for woodblock publication in 1694. This printed "Three Wives Commentary" edition (although Chen Tong isn't technically a wife of Wu Wushan), became a literary sensation at the time.

Various printed editions of The Peony Pavilion from the 16th, 17th, and 18th centuries, including scholarly commented editions

== Characters ==
There are around 160 characters in the play, with 30 main characters, including:

- Du Liniang is a sixteen-year-old young lady, daughter of Du Bao. The play's female protagonist.
- Liu Mengmei is a young scholar, Du Liniang's lover. The play's male protagonist.
- Du Bao is a court official, father of Du Liniang.
- Chunxiang is a maid to Du Liniang.
- Chen Zuiliang is a Confucian follower, who failed imperial examinations for fifteen times in his life, and later became Du Liniang's tutor.
- Sister Stone is the pivotal role in Du Liniang's revival and facilitates this young couple's happy union in the end.

== Performance productions ==
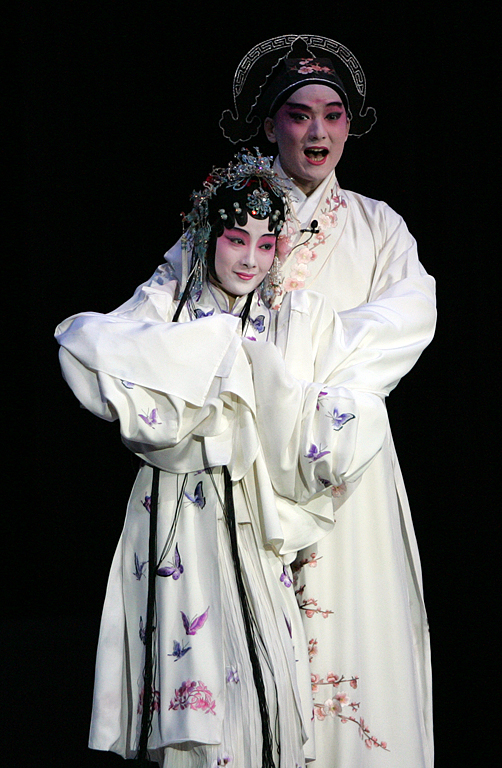
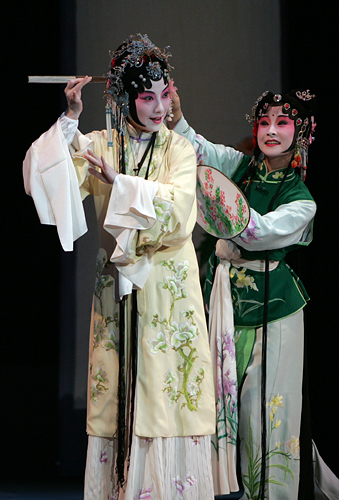
Actress Fengying Shen and actor Jiulin Yu performing The Peony Pavilion, Peking University Hall, 2006
- In 2012, an outdoor production of Metropolitan Museum galleries presented The Peony Pavilion in a compact seventy-minute version developed and directed by celebrated composer Tan Dun with choreography by Huang Doudou, one of China's most prominent dancers, in the Met's Astor Court, the courtyard modeled on a seventeenth-century garden.
- In 2012, the China Arts & Entertainment Group, a creative enterprise under the administration of the Ministry of Culture for the People's Republic of China, announced the United States premiere of a new dance drama production of The Peony Pavilion by China Jinling Dance Company of Nanjing would be performed at the David H. Koch Theater, Lincoln Center, for four performances in early January.
- In June 2008, the Suzhou Kunqu Opera company performed The Peony Pavilion at Sadler's Wells, London, the UK premiere. It was presented in 3 parts on consecutive evenings, each lasting 3 hours, though still much shorter than the original 20 hours.
- In May 2008, the National Ballet of China premièred a two-scene ballet adaptation of The Peony Pavilion in Beijing. This production was rewritten and directed by Li Liuyi, choreographed by Fei Bo, and the music was composed by Guo Wenjing. It also attended Lincoln Center Festival in 2008, at David H. Koch Theater, and Edinburgh International Festival in August 2011.
- The Imperial Granary's production The Peony Pavilion in Beijing, directed by Kunqu Opera master Wang Shiyu and scenography by the renowned Lin Zhaohua, was a permanent residency show for about 5 years since its premiere in 2007.
- In 2004, Pai Hsien-yung's youth edition of The Peony Pavilion aims to rejuvenate the traditional staging. Pai, a Chinese scholar at the University of California, Santa Barbara, and his colleagues - scholars and performers, some brought back from retirement - spent five months editing Tang's script. Working out of the Jiangsu Suzhou Kunqu Theater, the group condensed and adapted the original fifty-five scenes to twenty-seven scenes, and twenty hours of performance time to nine. Bai, who had chosen The Peony Pavilion because of its universal message of love, hoped that his rendition would attract youth to Kunqu. In fact, in its tour of China's top universities, the show was marketed as the Youth Edition of Peony Pavilion.[1] (The production also toured in Taipei, Hong Kong, Macau, seven cities in mainland China, and the Zellerbach Theater in Berkeley, California.) According to Bai, the goal of this youth-oriented production was to "give new life to the art form, cultivate a new generation of Kunqu aficionados, and offer respect to playwright Tang and all the master artists that came before."[2] His production of The Peony Pavilion was his way of doing so. Pai Hsien-yung has also used The Peony Pavilion as inspiration for a short story and a television script.
- Recent adaptations of The Peony Pavilion and allusions in popular music have revived interest in Kunqu, an art form that had been in danger of disappearing into obscurity. In 2001, UNESCO proclaimed Kunqu as a "Masterpiece of the Oral and Intangible Heritage of Humanity," yet the secrets of that heritage were kept by only a few aging masters in even fewer schools and institutions.
- In 1999, Lincoln Center for the Performing Arts produced a 20-hour version of The Peony Pavilion, directed by Chen and starring Qian Yi as Du Liniang. This 20-hour version was perhaps the first full-length staging in 300 years. Lincoln Center's version toured extensively, including New York, Paris, Milan, Singapore, Caen, Charleston, Aarhus, Berlin, Perth, and Vienna.[3]
- In 1998, an experimental or “avant-garde” production of The Peony Pavilion composed by Tan Dun, directed by Peter Sellars, and performed by Kun Opera Troupe, premiered in Vienna and travelled to London, Roma, Paris, and Berkeley later. Also, a CD recording of this opera was released entitled "Bitter Love".

=== Famous performers ===
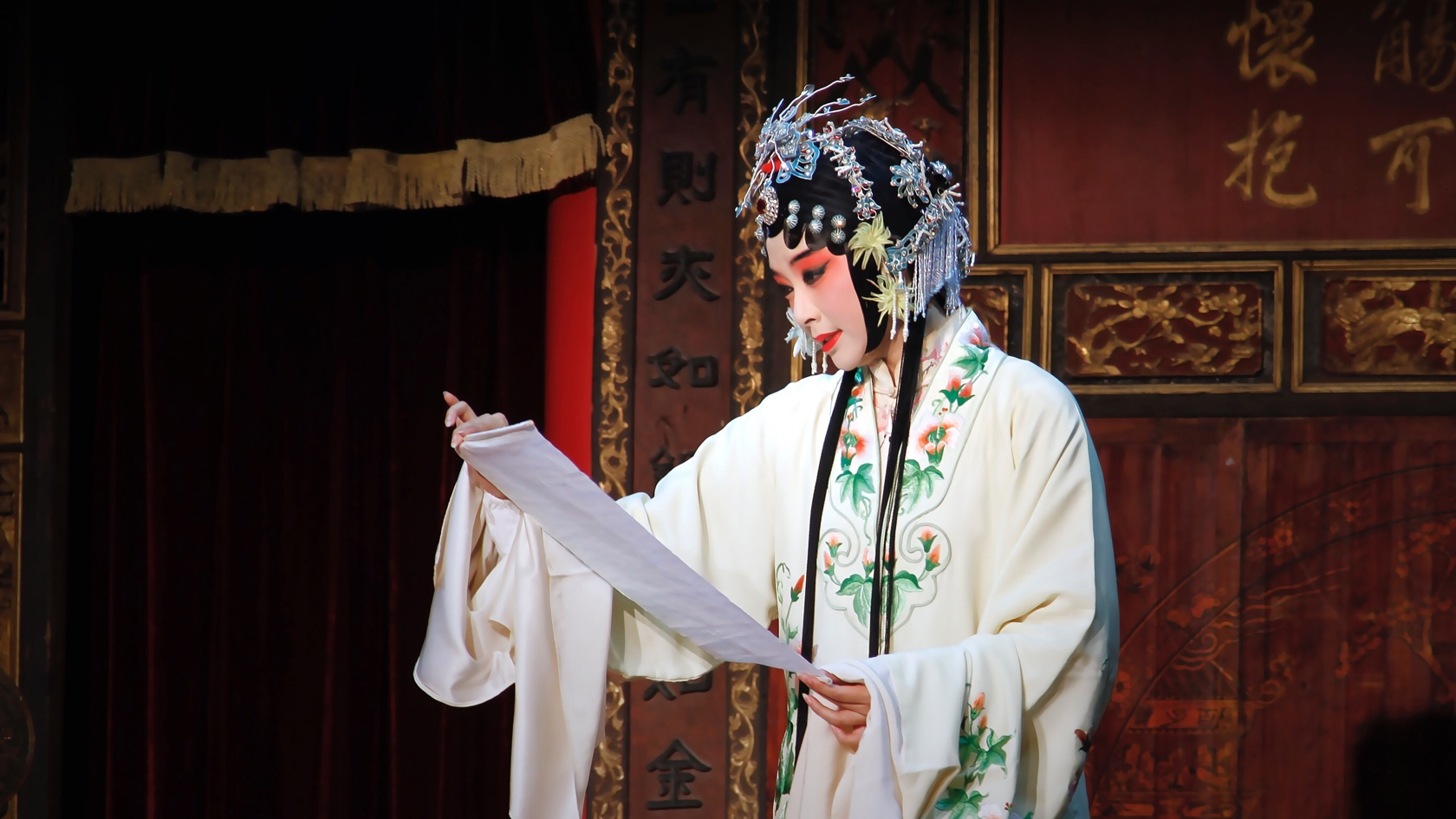
Actress Shan Wen performing The Peony Pavilion at the Nanjing Museum

- Mei Lanfang, sometimes paired with Yu Zhenfei (俞振飛/俞振飞) as Liu Mengmei, was famous for his sensitive portrayal of Du Liniang.
- The most famous actress of recent years is likely Zhang Jiqing's (張繼靑/张继青) traditional approach out of Nanjing's Jiangsu Province Kun Opera.
- In Shanghai, Jennifer Hua Wenyi (華文漪/华文漪) was very popular in the role and has played the role abroad several times.
- For a particularly pleasant and graceful interpretation, one may refer to Zhang Zhihong (張志紅)'s performances in the 1990s.

== Translation ==
- The earliest western version of The Peony Pavilion is in German - An selected translation of and an introduction to The Peony Pavilion, which published in an article China' s Love Stories, written by Xu Daolin (Hsu Dau-lin) in 1929.
- A complete German translation of The Peony Pavilion, translated by Vincenz Hundhausen, was published by Lacherre Publishing House in Zurich and Leipzig in 1937.
- A France translation of the scene "A Surprising Dream" was contained in An Anthology of Chinese Poems and Essays, published by the Delagraphe Publishing House in 1933.
- The latest complete French translation of The Peony Pavilion, translated by Andre Levy, was published in 2000.
- A selected translation in Russian by L. N. Menshkov in Oriental Classic Drama: India, China and Japan in 1976.
- Main complete translations in English:
1. The Peony Pavilion, translated by Cyril Birch, first published by Indiana University Press in 1980
2. The Peony Pavilion, translated by Zhang Guangqian, first published by Tourism Education Press in 1994.
3. The Peony Pavilion, translated by Wang Rongpei, first published by Shanghai Foreign Language Education Press in 2000.
4. The Peony Pavilion, translated by Xiaoping Yen, Dumont: Homa & Sekey Books, 2000.

== Other adaptations ==
=== Pop music ===
- Leehom Wang, the popular Taiwanese American music artist, referenced The Peony Pavilion in his song "Beside the Plum Blossoms" (在梅邊) on his album Heroes of Earth, which drew heavily from Beijing Opera and Kunqu inspiration. Lee-Hom sang and rapped over traditional Kunqu melodies blended with hip-hop beats. The music video features the artist, in modern clothes, superimposed on animated scenes. The animation depicts thematic and stylistic elements of The Peony Pavilion as well as hip-hop imagery: a break dancer does tricks atop a pavilion and pink peonies turn into speakers. A performer dressed in Kunqu costume plays the role of Liu in the music video, often singing with the Kunqu technique next to Lee-Hom. The artist quotes lines from The Peony Pavilion and entreats his lover, "Let me love you...in the classical style." The lyrics reveal a longing to return to the way love was portrayed in the drama. In this way, Lee-Hom draws visual and thematic inspiration from The Peony Pavilion in his song, signaling its relevance in contemporary popular culture.
- The Chinese indie band Carrchy use The Peony Pavilion as inspiration for their lyrics. The two young members of Carrchy, lyricist Keli and producer Fly, share an affinity for ancient Chinese opera and drama, an interest that appears prominently in their work. Borrowing some of the original text, Carrchy alludes to The Peony Pavilion in their song "Romantic Dream in the Garden" (遊園驚夢). The band uses Tang's lyrics and story to create the dual sensations of a lush and sensual spring and sorrow upon awakening from the dream. These Ming dynasty era-inspired lyrics play over thoroughly modern music.
- In the Jiangsu Pavilion at the Shanghai 2010 World Expo, a 13-minute short section from The Peony Pavilion produced by the Kunqu Opera Department of the Jiangsu Performing Art Group Co., Ltd. filmed in high definition was presented for the audience. Luo Chenxue and Zhang Zhengyao, young outstanding Kunqu Opera performers from Jiangsu province, play the leading roles in this film. By combining the traditional Kunqu performing art and modern video art techniques, a stage of poetic and simplified scenes is presented.

=== Film ===
- A film, Peony Pavilion (遊園驚夢), was released in 2001 under the same title. Though only indirectly related to the original work in terms of plot, it used the music extensively.
- A Taiwanese movie Wǒ de měilì yǔ āichóu 我的美麗與哀愁 directed by Chen Kuo-fu, with cinematography by Christopher Doyle and starring Luo Ruoying shared the same English title.

=== Novel ===
- In 2007, Lisa See's novel Peony in Love was published by Random House. The story's protagonist, Peony, falls in love with a young stranger, and her life loosely parallels that of Liniang.

== See also ==
- The Peach Blossom Fan
- Kunqu
