= Cyril Birch =

British-American sinologist (1925–2023)

- Born: 16 March 1925; Bolton, Lancashire, England
- Died: 19 May 2023 (aged 98); Albany, California, US
- Known for: Translations of Chinese literature

Academic background
- Education: SOAS University of London
- Academic advisor: Walter Simon

Academic work
- Discipline: Sinology
- Institutions: SOAS University of London; University of California, Berkeley

Cyril Birch (16 March 1925 – 19 May 2023) was a British-American sinologist who is known for his translations of Chinese literature. He was the Agassiz Professor in Chinese and Comparative Literature at University of California, Berkeley before his retirement.

== Biography ==
Birch was born in Bolton, Lancashire, England, and went to school at Bolton School. In 1941, when he was 16 years old he was accepted into a government program to learn Chinese, and attended a crash course in Chinese language for eighteen months at the School of Oriental and African Studies (SOAS) in London. In 1944 he was commissioned into the British Army as a lieutenant, and sent to Calcutta in India to work for Intelligence Corps.

In 1947, Birch was discharged from the army, and he returned to England, where he studied for a BA degree in Modern Chinese at SOAS. He received a first class degree in 1948, and then continued studying Chinese literature at SOAS as a graduate student under the supervision of Walter Simon. He received his PhD in 1954, with a dissertation on Feng Menglong's short story collection Stories Old and New. He taught Chinese language and literature at SOAS until 1960, including a year's sabbatical in Hong Kong where he learnt Cantonese. In 1946 he married Dorothy Nuttall, with whom he had two children, David and Catherine.

In 1960 Birch accepted a position in the Department of Oriental Languages (later renamed the Department of East Asian Languages and Cultures) at University of California, Berkeley, and he emigrated to the United States with his young family. He taught at Berkeley for thirty years, serving as head of department from 1964 to 1966 and 1982 to 1986. He held the post of Louis B. Agassiz Professor in Chinese and Comparative Literature at his retirement in 1990.

Birch died in the United States on 19 May 2023, at the age of 98.

== Legacy ==
Birch studied and taught both modern Chinese literature and pre-modern vernacular Chinese literature, translating a wide variety of works from different genres. He was particularly well known for his translations of the Qing dynasty play The Peach Blossom Fan, in collaboration with Chen Shih-hsiang and Harold Acton, and the Ming dynasty play The Peony Pavilion.

== Awards ==
On his retirement in 1990, Birch received the Berkeley Citation, which is awarded to outstanding faculty by the University of California, Berkeley.

The Cyril Birch Award for graduate students in Chinese literature in the departments of East Asian Languages and Cultures and Comparative Literature at University of California, Berkeley was established in his honour in 2017.

== Selected works ==
- 1958. Stories from a Ming Collection (New York: Grove Press)
- 1960. Chinese Myths and Fantasies (London: Oxford University Press)
- 1963. Chinese Communist Literature (New York: Praeger)
- 1965. With Donald Keene. Anthology of Chinese Literature vol. 1 (New York: Grove Press)
- 1972. With Donald Keene. Anthology of Chinese Literature vol. 2 (New York: Grove Press)
- 1974. Studies in Chinese Literary Genres (Berkeley: University of California Press)
- 1974. With Chen Shih-hsiang and Harold Acton. The Peach Blossom Fan (Berkeley: University of California Press)
- 1980. The Peony Pavilion (Bloomington: Indiana University Press)
- 1995. Scenes for Mandarins: the Elite Theater of the Ming (New York: Columbia University Press)
- 2001. Mistress and Maid: Meng Chengshun's Jiaohongji (New York: Columbia University Press)
