= The Peach Blossom Fan =

Qing dynasty play written by Kong Shangren

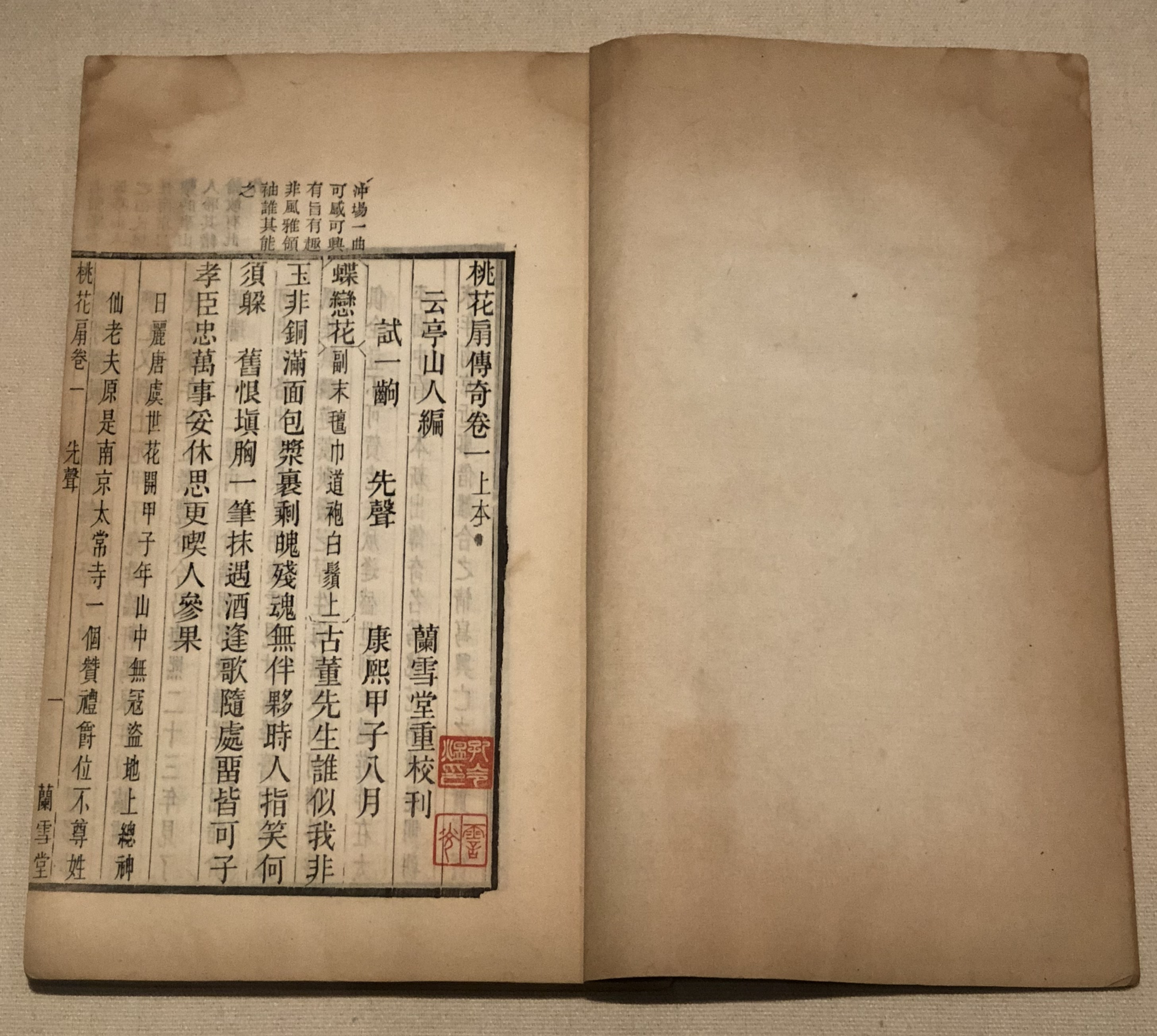
A printed edition of The Peach Blossom Fan, volume one, Lan Xuetang version, 1895

The Peach Blossom Fan (Chinese: 桃花扇; pinyin: Táohuā shàn; Wade–Giles: T'ao-hua shan; Jyutping: Tou4faa1 sin3) is a musical play and historical drama in 44 scenes that was completed in 1699 by the early Qing dynasty playwright Kong Shangren after more than 10 years of effort.

The play depicts the drama that resulted in the 1644 collapse of the Ming dynasty. The play recounts the death of the Ming dynasty through the love story of its two main characters, young scholar Hou Fangyu and a famous geji named Li Xiangjun. The Indiana Companion to Traditional Chinese Literature has called it "China's greatest historical drama".

An English translation by Chen Shih-hsiang (Chinese: 陳世驤; pinyin: Chén Shìxiāng) and Harold Acton, K.B.E. with Cyril Birch collaborating, appeared in 1976. Wai-yee Li published another translation with Oxford University Press in 2024.

== Background ==
The rise and fall of the early Qing dynasty pushed many poets and playwrights into thinking of the historical lessons taught by the downfall of the Ming. These writers, including Kong Shangren, expressed hatred and regret at its collapse through their works and a sense of historical responsibility. Kong said he wanted to expose the causes of the decay. Kong heard stories about Hong Guang (弘光) from his cousin Kong Fangxun (孔方訓), whose tale of Li Xiangjun inspired him into creating a script. It was only a draft because Kong wanted to collect further historical details. During his three-year sojourn in the south, where the story took place, Kong became acquainted with Ming loyalists like Mao Xiang (冒襄), Deng Hanyi (鄧漢儀), Xu Shuxue (許漱雪), Zong Yuanding (宗元鼎), She Chacun (社茶村) and masters of art like Shitao, Gong Xian, and Cha Shibiao (查士標). He also visited historical sites such as Plum Blossom Mountain (梅花岭), Qin Huai River (秦淮河), Swallow Rock (燕子磯), Imperial Palace, and the Mausoleum of the Ming Emperor (明孝陵).

Kong started work on "The Peach Blossom Fan" in 1648 and finished it in 1699, the culmination of more than twenty years of writing. The musical play contains 44 historical drama scenes emphasizing Chinese culture and characterizing the collapse in 1644 of the Ming Dynasty. It elaborates love and death of the Ming Dynasty, camouflaged in a love story of two main characters: Hou Fangyu, a young scholar, and a courtesan named Li Xiangjun (or, “Sovereign Fragrance”). The composition was conceived originally in two parts. There are an additional 40 scenes, but it is not long compared to other plays with 55 plus scenes, mainly with style drawn from the South. The plot is set in the Restoration Society, which sought reform to counter rampant corruption. Officials in the court plot or plan on how to cut short the emperor's reign and oversee the fall of the Ming dynasty, a plan being set and overseen by courtesans such as Ruan Dacheng.

"The Peach Blossom Fan" exposes the rot of official corruption, cowardly choices, and even outright callousness of those in authority. It details the power of people who come together in unison and love for a just cause and equally highlights the delicate balance of ascending to power without the interests of service to humanity at the core of decision-making.

== Composition ==
The play was conceived as a two-part play, as stated in the notes of Liang Qichao. The play has over 40 total scenes. Birch wrote that this length is "not unduly long" for a southern-style (Yangtze Valley) Chinese play, citing the 55-scene length of Peony Pavilion.

The main portion of the play includes exactly 40 scenes. The "Enquiry" (prelude) section is located in the play's beginning. The first portion of the main play forms part one, the upper (上) part. The "Inter-calary" scene is in between the two parts of the main play. The second portion of the main portion of the play forms part two, the lower (下) part. The "Additional Scene" and then the "Sequel", the epilogue, are the final portions of the play.

=== Plot ===
In the late Ming dynasty, the reformist Donglin movement reinstituted the "Restoration Society" (C: 復社, P: fùshè, W: fu-she) in Nanjing to fight corrupt officials. Hou Fangyu, one of the Society's members, falls in love with Geji Li Xiangjun beside the Qinhuai River. He sends Li Xiangjun a fan as a gift and becomes engaged to her. An official called Ruan Dacheng, delivers trousseau through celebrity Yang Longyou (T: 楊龍友, S: 杨龙友, P: Yáng Lóngyǒu, W: Yang Lung-yu) for Hou in order not to be isolated from the royal court. Hou is persuaded into accepting it, but Li Xiangjun rejects the gift firmly, which wins Hou Fangyu's respect.

Because he lacks military provisions, the commander of Wuchang Zuo Liangyu intends to move his army south to Nanjing, which terrifies the court. Considering Hou Fangyu's father had once been Zuo Liangyu's superior, Nanjing officials send Yang to ask Hou for help as a substitute. Hou Fangyu writes a letter to discourage Zuo from moving, but is slandered by Ruan for betraying the country, forcing him to find shelter with Shi Kefa in Yangzhou. Li Xiangjun and Hou Fangyu are separated.

At that time, the political situation runs out of control. News comes that Li Zicheng, the leader of peasant rebellion, had captured the capital Beijing, and that the Chongzhen Emperor had hanged himself. Ruan and Ma Shiying, the local governor of Fengyang (鳳陽督撫), crowns the Prince of Fu (福王) Zhu Yousong as new Emperor and changes the title of the reign into Hongguang 弘光. They persecute Reformists and indulge the Emperor with lust. Governor of Cao (曹撫) Tian Yang (田仰) covets Li's beauty and wants to take her as concubine. At the marriage ceremony, Li resists with a suicide attempt. She knocks her head on a pillar, leaving blood spots on the fan which was given by Hou Fangyu. After that, Yang draws a branch of peach blossoms with Li Xiangjun's blood on the fan, and it is sent to Hou Fangyu to show Li Xiangjun's determination. Jin Fu, author of Chinese Theatre, wrote that the fan and poem symbolize the integrity and determination of Li Xiangjun.

The Qing's army continues to go south, threatening the Ming government. However, the internal conflicts among four generals, who are in charge of strategic posts in north of the Yangtze River, are fierce, and Shi Kefa himself could not retrieve the defeat. Meanwhile, the new Emperor never cares about politics, only losing himself in song and dance. Ma Shiying and Ruan Dacheng send Li into the court as a gift, catering to the Emperor. Li Xiangjun scolds the evil officials to their faces and is beaten cruelly. Hou Fangyu flees to Nanjing during the chaotic war but was caught and sent into prison by Ruan Dacheng.

Yangzhou falls and Shi Kefa drowns himself into the river. The new Emperor is captured by the Qing army. The end of the play features a Taoist ceremony mourning the loss of the Ming dynasty. The remaining protagonists decide to seclude themselves instead of serving in the Qing dynasty. Hou Fangyu and Li Xiangjun meet each other occasionally at Qixia Mountain. When they are telling their affection, Zhang Yaoxing, a Taoist master, criticized them for the affair, asking "How laughable to cling to your amorous desires when the world has been turned upside down?" (or: "When there are such tremendous changes, you still indulge in love?"). This gives them both a realization. Li Xiangjun thus becomes a nun, while Hou Fangyu follows her step to become a Taoist priest. Cyril Birch, who collaborated on a University of California Press translation of The Peach Blossom Fan, wrote that "There can be no happy ending, given the historical authenticity of the action".

Like other Southern-style plays the play incorporates martial scenes and a love affair central to the plot. Birch wrote that the Hou Fangyu-Fragrant Princess love affair "is brilliantly integrated with the more weighty matter of the plot" and that the martial scenes "perfectly reflect the unhappy progress of the Ming cause and depict in vivid terms the gallant but ultimately futile loyalty or generals like Huang Te-kung and Shih-K'o-fa."

== Famous passage ==
In the last act of Peach Blossom Fan, Su Kunsheng (蘇昆生) recounted his visit to the old place after the fall of the Southern Ming Dynasty. He mourned the old capital of Nanjing and composed a set of songs "Lamenting Jiangnan" (哀江南) to express his sorrow for the separation of the people from their hometown. The whole song is desolate and sad, and is a famous piece in the legend of Ming and Qing Dynasties. The following is the last song of "Lamenting Jiangnan":

| 【哀江南·離亭宴帶歇指煞】 | Lament for Jiangnan – Farewell Banquet |
|---|---|
| 俺曾見金陵玉殿鶯啼曉， 秦淮水榭花開早， 誰知道容易冰消。 | I once beheld, in Jinling's jeweled halls, orioles singing at dawn, And by Qinhuai's waters, flowers blooming early. Who knew such splendor would melt like ice? |
| 眼看他起朱樓， 眼看他宴賓客， 眼看他樓塌了。 | I watched him raise his vermilion tower, I watched him feast his honored guests, I watched that tower crumble and fall. |
| 這青苔碧瓦堆， 俺曾睡風流覺， 將五十年興亡看飽。 | Among mossy tiles and green eaves piled, I once slept the dreams of romance, And saw the rise and fall of fifty years play out. |
| 那烏衣巷不姓王， 莫愁湖鬼夜哭， 鳳凰台棲梟鳥。 | Now in Wuyi Lane, no Wang clan remains, At Mochou Lake, ghosts wail through the night, And on Phoenix Terrace, only owls roost. |
| 殘山夢最真， 舊境丟難掉， 不信這輿圖換稿。 | Broken hills bring truest dreams, Old places, once lost, are hard to forget— Who could believe even the maps would be redrawn? |
| 謅一套哀江南， 放悲聲唱到老。 | So I compose this Lament for Jiangnan, And sing my sorrow till life's end. |

== Characters ==
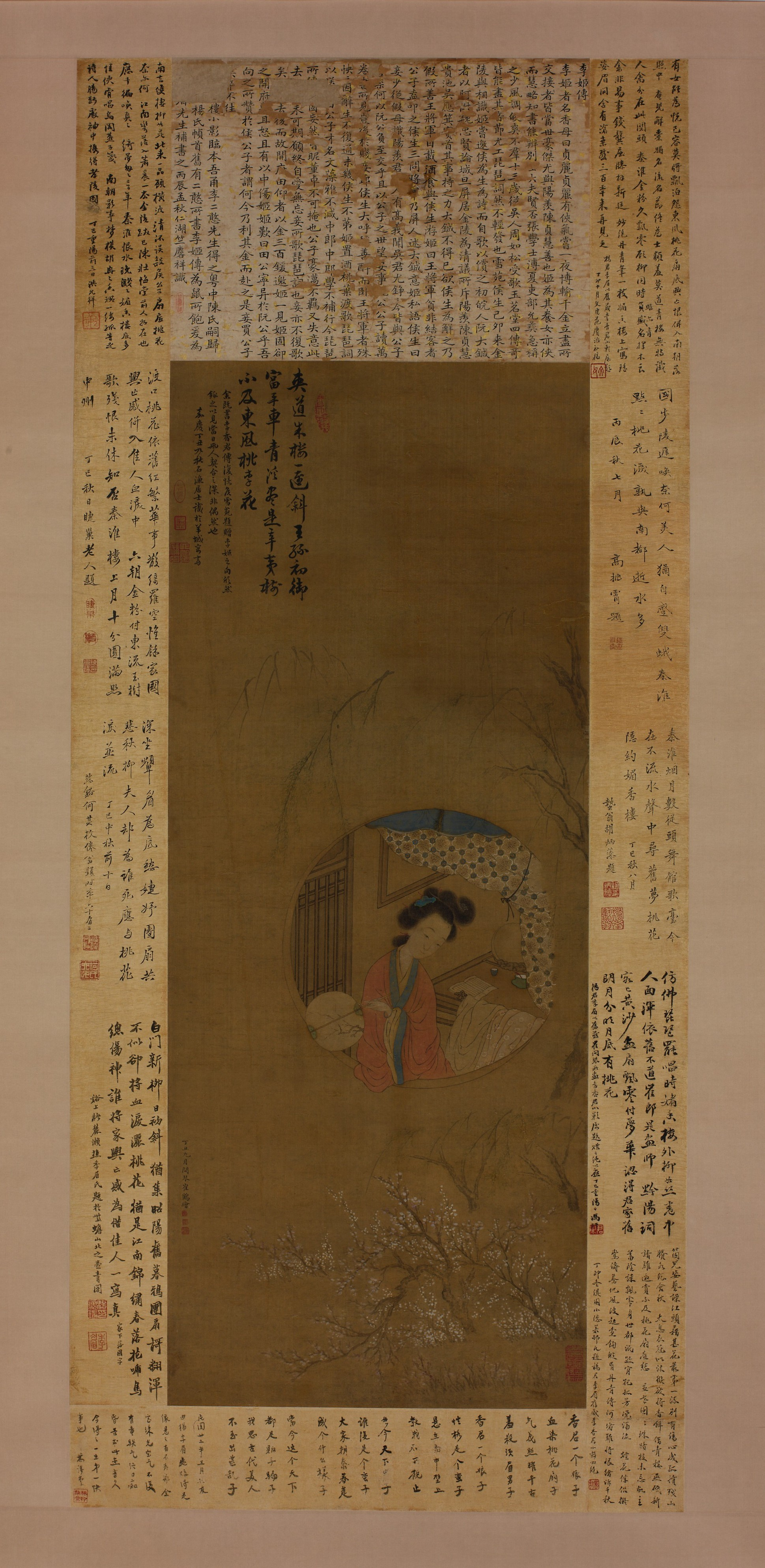
Portrait of Li Xiangjun by Cui He, circa 1800–1850 (Metropolitan Museum of Art)

The play involves 30 dramatis personae. The protagonists are historical figures. Like many southern Chinese (Yangtze Valley) plays, there are contrasting character groupings. Hou Fangyu and his friends are in one grouping, while the Ma Shiying and Ruan Dacheng group forms an opposing grouping. Each role-type may control a set of characters. The "painted-face" (P: jing, W: ching) role controls Ma Shiying, Liu Liangzuo, Su Kunsheng, and Zhang Yanzhu. The "comic" (P: chou, W: ch'ou) role type controls Liu Jingting, Cai Yisuo, Zhen Tuoniang, and several attendants and servants.

Birch wrote that the audience is "led to a deep respect for Hou Fang-yü, Liu Ching-t'ing, and Shih K'o-fa, as in their different ways they follow their doomed ideals."

=== Character list ===
(in order of appearance)

The Master of Ceremonies of the Imperial Temple in Nanjing. He states that The Peach Blossom Fan "employs the emotions entailed by separation and union, to depict feelings about rise and fall." (T: 借離合之情，寫興亡之感,[...], S: 借离合之情，写兴亡之感,[...])

- C. H. Wang wrote that the Master "seems to impersonate" Kong Shangren.

Hou Fangyu (C: 侯方域, P: Hóu Fāngyù, W: Hou Fang-yü), a young scholar of distinction

- Hou Fangyu opposes corrupt officials who sell out to Manchus and is a loyalist to the Ming cause.

Chen Zhenhui (Ch'en Chen-hui), fellow member of the Revival Club
Wu Yingji (Wu Ying-chi), fellow member of the Revival Club
Liu Jingting (C: 柳敬亭, P: Liǔ Jìngtíng, W: Liu Ching-t'ing), a veteran minstrel of renown

- Lianche Tu Fang, an author on an encyclopedia article about Liu Jingting, wrote that the person was one of two people used in the story to "bring together the various incidents of the plot."

Li Zhenli (Li Chen-li), proprietress of an elegant house of pleasure and foster mother of the heroine
Yang Wencong (Yang Wen-ts'ung), painter, poet, and official
Li Xiangjun, a Gējì and the heroine. Li Xiangjun, the Fragrant Princess, follows her desires on whom to love and opposes bullies on the royal court.

- Jin Fu, author of Chinese Theatre, wrote that "Although Li Xiangjun is a singer, her emotions and actions are shown to be more noble than those of the scholars."

Su Kunsheng (T: 蘇崑生, S: 苏昆生, P: Sū Kūnshēng, W: Su K'un-sheng), Li Xiangjun's singing teacher - Su Kunsheng asks Li Xiangjun to perform The Peony Pavilion.

- Lianche Tu Fang, an author on an encyclopedia article about Liu Jingting, wrote that the person was one of two people used in the story to "bring together the various incidents of the plot."

Ruan Dacheng (T: 阮大鋮, S: 阮大铖, P: Ruǎn Dàchéng, W: Juan Ta-ch'eng), corrupt politician, dramatist and poet
Ding Jizhi (Ting Chi-chih), poet-musician
Shen Gongxian (Shen Kung-hsien), poet-musician
Zhang Yanzhu (Chang Yen-chu), poet-musician
Bian Yujing (Pien Yü-ching), professional singing-girl
Kou Baimen (K'ou Pai-men), professional singing-girl
Zheng Tuoniang (Cheng T'o-niang), professional singing-girl

- Cyril Birch wrote that Zheng Tuoniang is "an important female part" and that the role to "offset the demure elegance of the ingenue (tan) role, Fragrant Princess", is one of the "major functions" of Zheng Tuoniang. Birch wrote that "We can imagine her as conspicuously ugly with her tart's makeup, lewd gestures, and regular caterwaul of a singing voice".

General Zuo Liangyu (C: 左良玉, P: Zuǒ Liángyù, W: Tso Liang-yü), commander of the Wu Chang garrison
General Shi Kefa (C: 史可法, P: Shǐ Kéfǎ, W: Shih K'o-fa), President of the Board of War at Nanjing

- Birch states that Shi Kefa is a general who has a "gallant but ultimately futile loyalty".

Ma Shiying (T: 馬士英, S: 马士英, P: Mǎ Shìyīng, W: Ma Shih-ying), Governor of Feng Yang and Grand Secretary
General Yuan Jixian (Yüan Chih-hsien)
General Huang Degong (Huang Te-kung)

- Birch states that Huang Degong is a general who has a "gallant but ultimately futile loyalty".

Emperor Hong Guang (Emperor Hung-kuang)
General Liu Zeqing (Liu Tse-ch'ing)
General Gao Jie (Kao Chieh)
General Liu Liangzuo (Liu Liang-tso)
Lan Ying (T: 藍 瑛, S: 蓝 瑛, P: Lán Yīng, W: Lan Ying), a famous painter
Cai Yisuo (C: 蔡益所, P: Cài Yìsuǒ, W: Ts'ai Yi-so), a Nanjing bookseller
Zhang Wei (T: 张 薇, S: 张 薇, P: Zhāng Wēi, W: Chang Wei) or Zhang the Taoist (T: 張瑤星, S: 张瑶星, P: Zhāng yáoxīng), former commander of the Imperial Guard in Beijing
Huang Shu (Huang Shu), Inspector General
Tian Xiong (T'ien Hsiung), adjutant to General Huang Degong
Han Zanzhou (Hsu Ch'ing-chün), a magistrate's runner

== Analysis ==
Cyril Birch wrote that "The world of The Peach Blossom Fan is that late-Ming world of gross corruption, of callousness and cowardice and the breakdown of a long-cherished order. Yet the quality of life revealed in the play is of extraordinary cultivation and sensibility. There is a great poignancy in this contrast". C. H. Wang wrote that the play has an intertwining of the motifs of separation and union of people in love, and the motifs of the decline and ascent of political powers, and that "The parallel structure is not contained within a single plot only" but rather to the entire work.

== Creation and conception ==
C. H. Wang, author of "The Double Plot of T'ao-hua shan," wrote that the author "attempted in this work not only to retell for common theatre-goers a romantic love-story but also to arouse scholars-especially Confucian intellectuals-to consider why and how China so easily lost her strength in the national crises of 1644-45." The play was written fewer than 50 years after the fall of the Ming dynasty, during the reign of the Kangxi Emperor of the Qing dynasty.

== Stage performance and adaptations ==
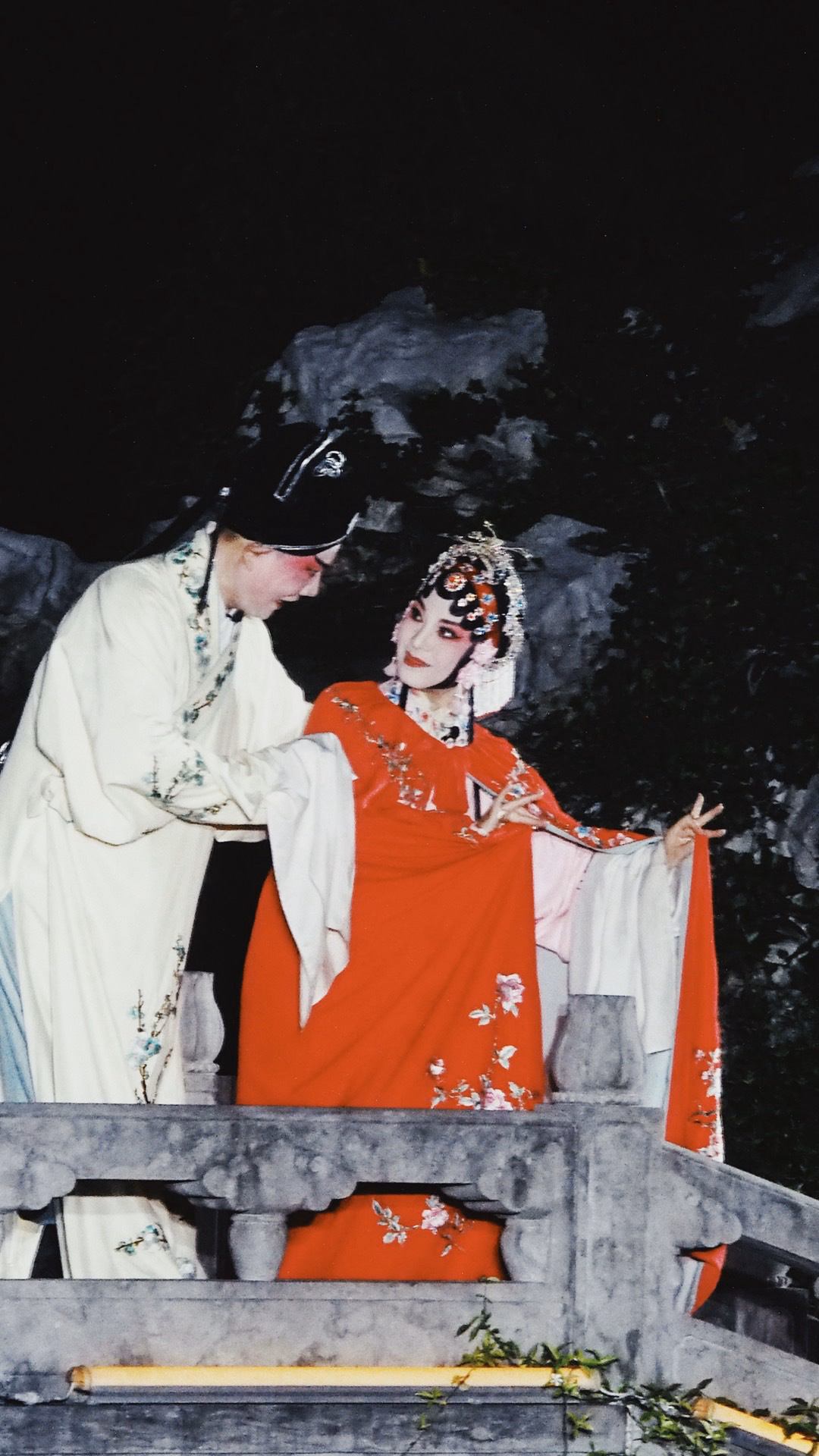
A performance of The Peach Blossom Fan by actress Gong Yinlei and actor Qian Zhenrong

As soon as Kong finished the script of The Peach Blossom Fan, it was lent out and spread quickly among scholars and aristocrats. In the autumn of the year Jimao, even the emperor sent servant to Kong's house, asking in haste for the complete script. In the next year, General Li Muan set up a theatrical troupe called Jin Dou to perform the play, which gained huge fame immediately. Each time the troupe performed, the actors and actresses were given considerable tips.

The play was a particular favorite of the Kangxi Emperor.

Merchants in Yang Zhou once raised 160 thousand gold for the costume in the play.

During the last century, the play has been performed in forms of Peking Opera, Drama, Chu Opera, Gui Opera, Yue Opera, Xiang Opera, Min Opera, Bei Kun, Nan Kun and Huangmei Opera, and it has been adapted into 3 kinds of endings, including one that ends in a happy reunion.

In 1937, when World War II broke out, the famous Chinese playwright Ouyang Yuqian altered the ending of the play into "Having cut his hair, Hou surrendered to the Qing dynasty and served its royal court", satirizing the traitor Wang Jingwei of that time.

In 1964, playwright Mei Qian (梅阡) and Sun Jing (孫敬), using Ou's ending, put the drama into a movie script, starring famous actress Wang Danfeng and actor Feng Zhe.

In 2004, the California Institute of the Arts staged a version directed by Chen Shi-Zheng. The text was written by playwright Edward Mast and songs created by Stephin Merritt.

== Publication ==
The Peach Blossom Fan was printed during Kong Shangren's lifetime. Several variations in the text appear in subsequent editions of the play.

There was 1982 edition edited by Wang Chi-ssu (Chinese: 王季思; pinyin: Wáng Jìsī; Wade–Giles: Wang^{2} Chi^{4}-ssu^{1}) and others, published in Beijing. The play is presented in four juan (chüan) rather than the standard two parts.

=== Translations ===
Chen Shih-hsiang and Harold Acton, K.B.E. published a translation in 1976, with Cyril Birch collaborating. Birch wrote that the translation is "complete except for a very few places". Portions translated included what Birch described as "the contrasting low punning and bawdy badinage," the scholars' formal compliments and greetings, "high poetry" within the songs, and self-introduction speeches and soliloquies described by Birch as "sometimes rather stiff".

Acton wrote that he and Chen Shih-hsiang translated the play "for its own sake rather than for publication." When Chen died in May 1971 he left a manuscript draft with all scenes except for the final seven translated. Cyril Birch, who had worked with Chen, translated the final seven scenes and revised the drafts. Birch used the People's Literature Press 1959 Beijing edition with annotations by Wang Chi-ssu and Su Huan-chung. The translation uses footnotes for what Birch described as "many" of these allusions, but "many more have been sacrificed to the interests of readability". Birch wrote that in the final scenes, if the closest translation "would have impossibly retarded the movement of the verse" Birch used paraphrasing to follow on the actions of Chen Shih-hsiang and Acton. Birch cited Scene 32 as an example of a place where the translation was abridged. There the Master of Ceremonies' speech's strings of instructions indicating commands such as "Kneel! Rise! Kneel!" were omitted. Birch wrote that "These commands, in performance, would punctuate an elaborate posturing dance, but they make for boring reading."

Wai-yee Li published another translation with Oxford University Press in 2024. The companion website includes contemporary reactions, the author's commentary, and historical context.

== Reception ==
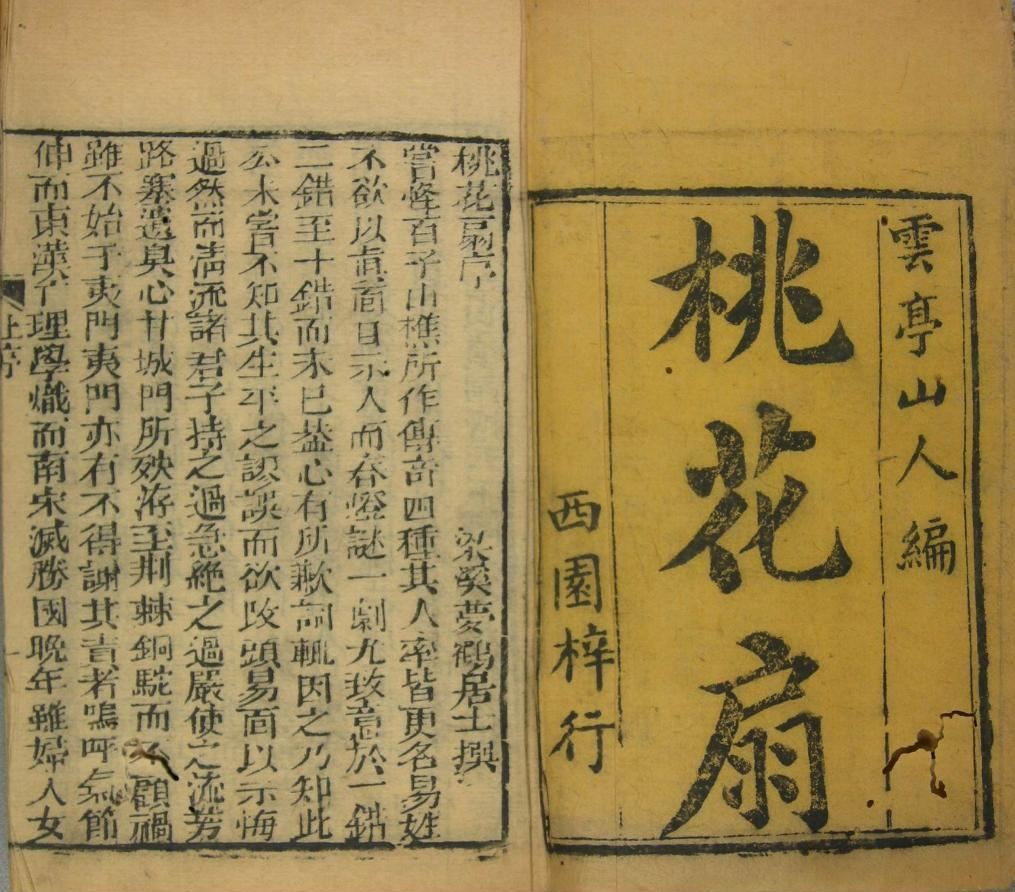
A printed edition of The Peach Blossom Fan, Xiyuan version, 1699-1722

Liang Qichao (1873–1929) wrote that this play was "a book of utmost desolation, poignant splendor, and utmost turmoil." He further wrote: "With the refined strictness of its structure, the magnificence of its style, and the depth of its sentiments, I would venture that Kong Shangren's Peach Blossom Fan surpasses the works of all epochs!"

Scholar Wang Guowei (1877–1927), who held the play in great esteem, compared it to the novel Dream of the Red Chamber.

Harold Acton, who co-wrote an English translation, stated that The Peach Blossom Fan is a "highly poetic chronicle play" that is "a vivid evocation of the downfall of the Ming dynasty" that "deserves to be better known to students of Chinese literature and history."

Dylan Suher of the literary magazine Asymptote described The Peach Blossom Fan as "The greatest masterpiece of the literature of political disappointment", and the play contains "some of the most elegant Chinese ever written—a density of poetic expression that rivals Shakespeare's."

Several modern adaptations of the play has also received acclaim. Kevin J. Wetmore reviewing the Edward Mast adapted and Chen Shi-Zheng directed version for Theatre Journal, describes it as "a powerfully moving, brilliantly theatrical, and playfully entertaining production."

== See also ==
- The Peony Pavilion
