= Kong Shangren =

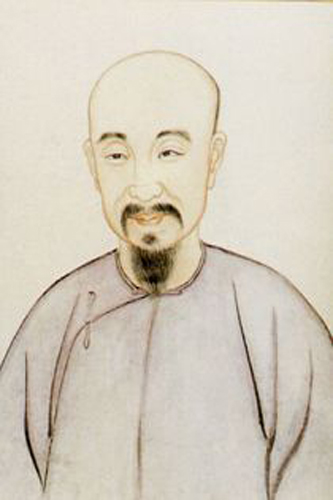
- Born: 1648; Qufu, Shandong, Qing Dynasty
- Died: 1718 (aged 69–70)
- Notable work: The Peach Blossom Fan

Kong Shangren (Chinese: 孔尚任; pinyin: Kǒng Shàngrèn; Wade–Giles: K'ung^{3} Shang^{4}-jen^{4}; 1648–1718) was a Qing dynasty dramatist and poet best known for his chuanqi play The Peach Blossom Fan about the last days of the Ming dynasty.

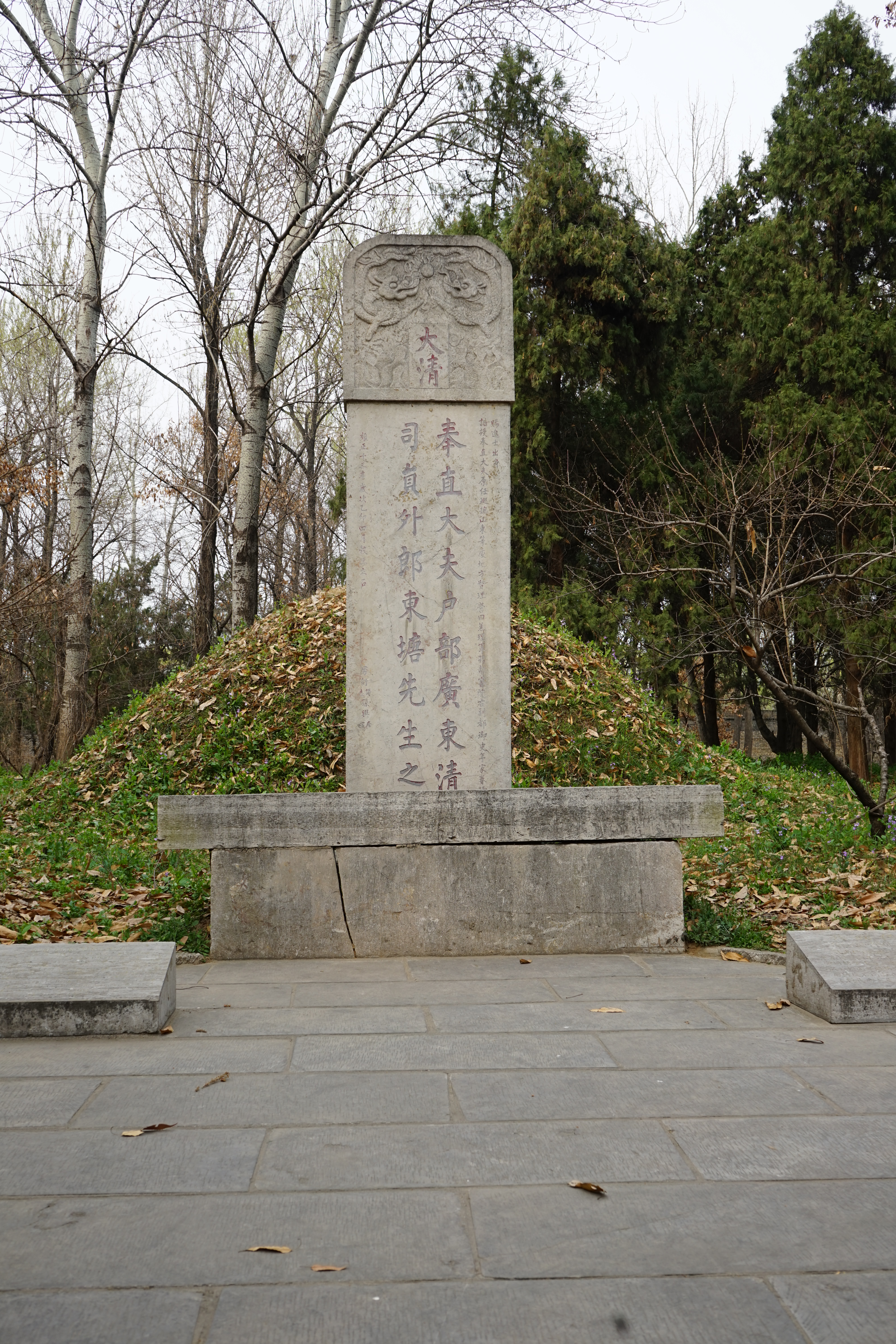
Kong Shangren tomb in the Cemetery of Confucius, Qufu

Born in Qufu, Kong was a 64th-generation descendant of Confucius. He guided the Kangxi Emperor when he visited Qufu.

The Peach Blossom Fan tells the story of the love story between the scholar Hou Fangyu and the courtesan Li Xiangjun, against the dramatic backdrop of the short history of the Southern Ming. It remains a favourite of the Kun opera (kunqu) stage.

Kong Shangren is known as the author of a curious poem dedicated to the eyeglasses, a Western innovation brought to Macau by the Portuguese.
