= Tang Xianzu =

Chinese playwright (1550–1616)

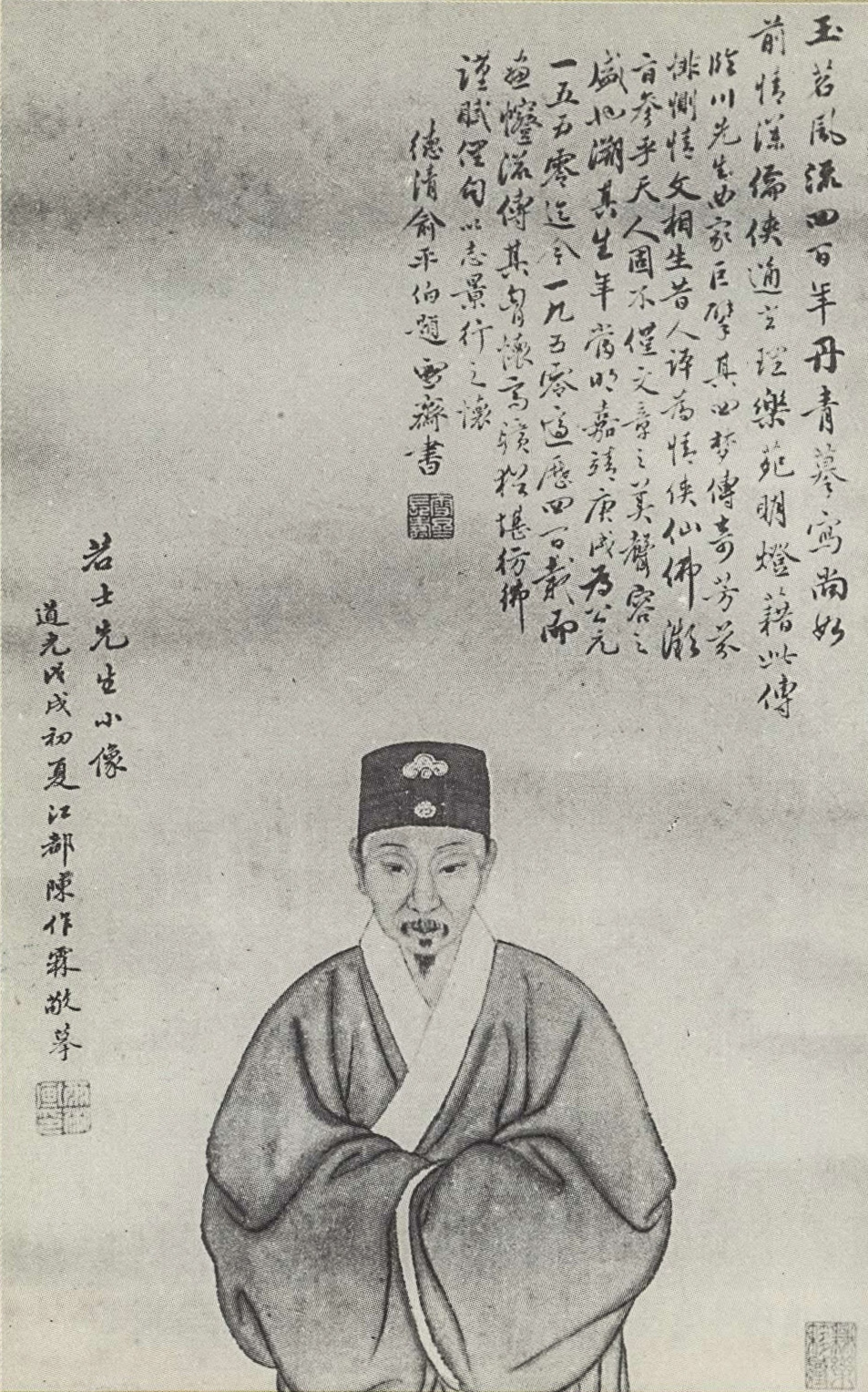
- Traditional Chinese: 湯顯祖
- Simplified Chinese: 汤显祖
Transcriptions
Standard Mandarin
- Hanyu Pinyin: Tāng Xiǎnzǔ
- Gwoyeu Romatzyh: Tang Sheantzuu
- Wade–Giles: T'ang^{1} Hsien^{3}-tzu^{3}
- IPA: [tʰáŋ ɕjɛ̀n.tsù]
Yue: Cantonese
- Yale Romanization: Tōng Hín-jóu
- Jyutping: Tong^{1} Hin^{2}-zou^{2}
Southern Min
- Tâi-lô: Thng Hiánn-tsóo

Tang Xianzu (traditional Chinese: 湯顯祖; simplified Chinese: 汤显祖; 24 September 1550 – 29 July 1616), courtesy name Yireng (義仍), was a Chinese playwright of the Ming Dynasty.

== Biography ==
Tang Xianzu was a native of Linchuan, Jiangxi. His career as an official was mainly limited to low-level positions. He passed the provincial examinations (juren) at the age of 21 and the imperial examinations imperial examinations (jinshi) at the age of 34. He held official posts in Nanjing, Zhejiang, and Guangdong, among other locations.

From 1593 to 1598, Tang served as magistrate of Suichang County in Zhejiang Province. In 1598, he retired to his hometown, where he focused on writing. He died in 1616, the same year as the English playwright William Shakespeare.

Tang's major plays are collectively known as the Four Dreams, named for the prominent role of dreams in each plot. These works continue to be performed, either in part or in adapted full versions, in the Chinese kunqu opera tradition. His best-known work, Mudan Ting (The Peony Pavilion), is widely regarded as his masterpiece and has been translated into English several times. A complete English translation of his dramatic works was published in China in 2014 and in London in 2018.

Tang Xianzu (1550–1616), courtesy name Yireng, art name Ruoshi (若士), and self-styled as the Taoist Devotee of Qingyuan (清远道人), lived through the reigns of three late Ming emperors, a period marked by political corruption and instability. He was born during the reign of the Jiajing Emperor (1522–1566) and spent most of his adulthood under the Longqing Emperor (1567–1572) and Wanli Emperor (1573–1620).

Tang came from a scholarly family with a lineage dating back to his great-grandparents. He passed the second-level civil service examination at 21 but did not succeed at the third level until 13 years later. His early failure was partly attributed to his refusal to accompany the two sons of the Grand Secretary Zhang Juzheng (张居正) to their examinations, which displeased the powerful official. After Zhang's death, Tang was able to obtain a government position.

Refusing to seek political advancement through patronage, Tang lacked the support of influential figures such as Zhang Siwei (张四维) and Shen Shixing (申时行). He was appointed Taischang scholar in Nanjing, a largely ceremonial post overseeing rites and sacrificial ceremonies. Nevertheless, he actively voiced concern over governance, submitting memorials to the throne that exposed corrupt practices, including the misappropriation of relief funds.

In his memorial Commentary on the Leadership and Supportive Duties of the Bureaucratic Officialdom (《论辅臣科臣疏》), Tang criticised the political influence of Zhang Juzheng during the first decade of the Wanli Emperor's reign and that of Shen Shixing during the next. His criticisms led to his reassignment to Guangdong Province, where he was tasked with overseeing prisoners in Xuwen County.

In the twenty-first year of Wanli's reign (1593), Tang was promoted and appointed magistrate of Suichang County, Zhejiang Province. Known for his impartiality and integrity, he was respected by the local population. However, frustrated by bureaucratic constraints and his limited ability to enact reforms, he withdrew from politics in 1598 and returned to Linchuan to focus on literary pursuits.

Tang grew up immersed in the Chinese classics. His father was a Confucian scholar, while his grandfather followed Taoist teachings derived from Laozi and Zhuangzi. These influences shaped Tang's character and are reflected in his works. As a youth, he studied under Luo Rufang (罗汝芳), a representative of the Taizhou School, whose teachings, influenced by Chan (Zen) Buddhism, differed from the Confucian orthodoxy of Cheng Yi and Zhu Xi.

While in Nanjing, Tang befriended the Zen master Daguan (达观禅师) and encountered A Book to Burn (《焚书》) by Li Zhi (李贽), whose critiques of orthodoxy resonated with him. Tang later met Li Zhi in Linchuan. Both Daguan and Li Zhi were regarded as leading intellectuals of the late Ming, and their ideas left a lasting impact on Tang's thought.

Two main themes emerge from Tang's reflections on life. Initially, like many officials, he believed in the possibility of political reform through active participation. Disillusioned by the realities of governance, he later embraced Buddhist and Taoist perspectives, recognising life's transience. However, he remained internally conflicted, as reflected in works such as Record of Handan and Record of the Southern Bough.

Tang also carried forward Li Zhi's advocacy for the affirmation of individual needs and selfhood, a stance that challenged the restrictive moralism of the Cheng–Zhu school. This perspective is central to The Peony Pavilion, which celebrates personal desire and the human spirit.

== Legacy ==
Several Ming and Qing playwrights adopted Tang's writing style and referred to themselves as the Yumintang or Linchuan school. Tang is noted for his distinctive approach to playwriting, which often prioritised the expression of ideas over strict adherence to logical semantics. His style has been compared to that of Western writers such as William Shakespeare and Philip Sidney, who employed similar techniques in their works.

== Works ==
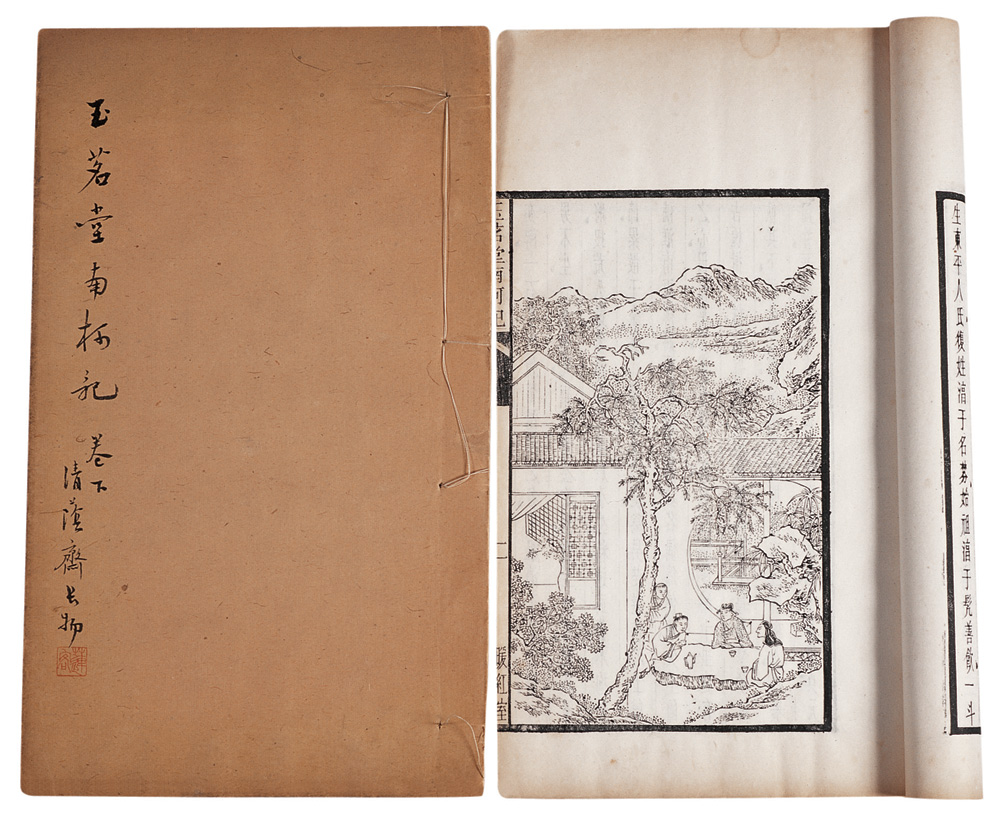
A page from a printed copy of Record of Southern Bough (also known as A Dream Under the Southern Bough)

=== Major plays ===
- The Purple Flute (Chinese: 紫簫記; pinyin: Zǐxiāo Jì)
- The Purple Hairpin (Chinese: 紫釵記; pinyin: Zǐchāi Jì)

See The Purple Hairpin (1957) 紫釵記 (粵劇) by Tang Ti-sheng

- The Peony Pavilion (Chinese: 牡丹亭; pinyin: Mǔdān Tíng)
- Record of Handan (Chinese: 邯鄲記; pinyin: Hándān Jì)
- Record of Southern Bough (Chinese: 南柯記; pinyin: Nánkē Jì)

=== The Four Dreams of Linchuan ===
Tang's four best-known plays, collectively called the Four Dreams of Linchuan (臨川四夢), reflect his evolving views on life's meaning and the relationship between the individual and society.

- The Purple Hairpin was described by Tang as "one droplet of my obsession."
- The Peony Pavilion was his declaration of "living and dying for the obsession."
- Record of the Southern Bough expressed the first realisation of "being entangled by the obsession."
- Record of Handan conveyed a retrospective sigh over "a whole life wasted upon such obsession."

Read sequentially, the plays can be interpreted as a journey from passionate advocacy of self-expression to doubts about the tangibility of lived reality. Tang's works are credited with shifting Chinese theatre from primarily entertainment to philosophical exploration, contributing to the maturation of drama as an art form. Contemporary audiences admired them for their literary quality; in Prosody of Qu (曲律), Wang Jide praised Tang's language as "graceful yet seductive, with words that drill to the bone." In the prologue to Record of Handan, Shen Jifei wrote, "the paintbrush of Linchuan draws flowers in dreams." Later playwrights such as Ruan Dacheng and Wu Bing admired his style, though their works were seen as imitative.

=== Composition and adaptations ===
Tang began his first chuanqi play, The Purple Flute, in the first year of the Wanli Emperor's reign (1573). Fourteen years later, he completed and retitled it The Purple Hairpin. The other three plays—The Peony Pavilion, Record of Handan, and Record of the Southern Bough—were written after his retirement. Because dreams play a central role in each, and Tang's study was named White Camellia Hall (玉茗堂), the collection is also known as Four Dreams of the White Camellia Hall (玉茗堂四梦).

The inspiration for The Purple Flute came from The Story of Huo Xiaoyu (《霍小玉传》) by Tang dynasty novelist Jiang Fang. Tang's adaptation altered the ending, transforming Huo Xiaoyu from a tragic, wronged figure into a devoted wife who reunites with her husband through the aid of a heroic friend of the emperor. While elegant in language and affirming the centrality of romantic love, the play has been regarded as less innovative than Tang's other works.

Record of Handan, adapted from Shen Jiji's The Tale of the Pillow (《枕中记》), functions as a satirical critique of Ming political elites. Through the story of Scholar Lu—who rises to the highest offices through bribery, enjoys a life of excess, and dies of exhaustion before awakening to find only moments have passed—Tang comments on the transience of fame and status, the corruption of bureaucracy, and the fickleness of political alliances.

Record of the Southern Bough, based on Li Gongzuo's The Prefect of the Southern Bough (《南柯太守传》), follows Chunyu Fen, who dreams of a life of love and political success in the ant-kingdom of Huaian. After his wife's death and his fall from power, he awakes beneath a locust tree to find his experiences were illusory. Although the play ends with a Buddhist renunciation of worldly attachment, it affirms love as the most enduring value, despite its impermanence.

=== Themes and style ===
Tang's works share several defining characteristics:

1. Dreams as a narrative device — All four major plays use dreams to merge personal desire with broader social tensions. Tang saw dreams as reflections of human needs and perceptions of reality, bridging the conscious and unconscious.
2. Primacy of love over reason — Tang argued that love was an innate human quality and the source of artistic expression. He believed drama's power lay in awakening "humane feelings" in audiences, transcending social divisions. He rejected the Cheng–Zhu Confucian view that emotion and reason should be balanced, instead seeing them as irreconcilable forces.
3. "Strangeness" — Like other marvel tales (奇書) of the Ming and Qing periods, Tang's plays exhibit imaginative plots and unconventional characterisations. Tang valued a playwright's freedom to shape reality through creativity, blending the past, present, and imagined worlds.

Tang also defended his work against unauthorised revisions. When Shen Jing of the Wujiang School altered The Peony Pavilion's melodies to suit his taste, Tang protested that "the essence of a piece was the free flow of its charm and interest," consistent with his artistic principles.

=== Works available in English ===
- The Peony Pavilion trans. Cyril Birch. Bloomington: Indiana University Press, 1980.
- The Peony Pavilion trans. Wang Rongpei. Changsha: Hunan People's Press, 2000.
- A Dream Under the Southern Bough trans. Zhang Guangqian. Beijing: Foreign Languages Press, 2003. ISBN 7-119-03270-4.
- The Handan Dream trans. Wang Rongpei. Beijing: Foreign Languages Press, 2003
- The Complete Dramatic Works of Tang Xianzu trans. Wang Rongpei & Zhang Ling Bloomsbury: London, 2018. ISBN 9781912392025

=== Studies available in English ===
- Swatek, Catherine. Peony Pavilion Onstage: Four Centuries in the Career of a Chinese Drama. Ann Arbor: University of Michigan Center for Chinese Studies, 2003.
- Tan, Tian Yuan, and Paolo Santangelo. Passion, Romance, and Qing: The World of Emotions and States of Mind in Peony Pavilion. 3 vols. Leiden: Brill, 2014.
