= Wang Leehom discography =

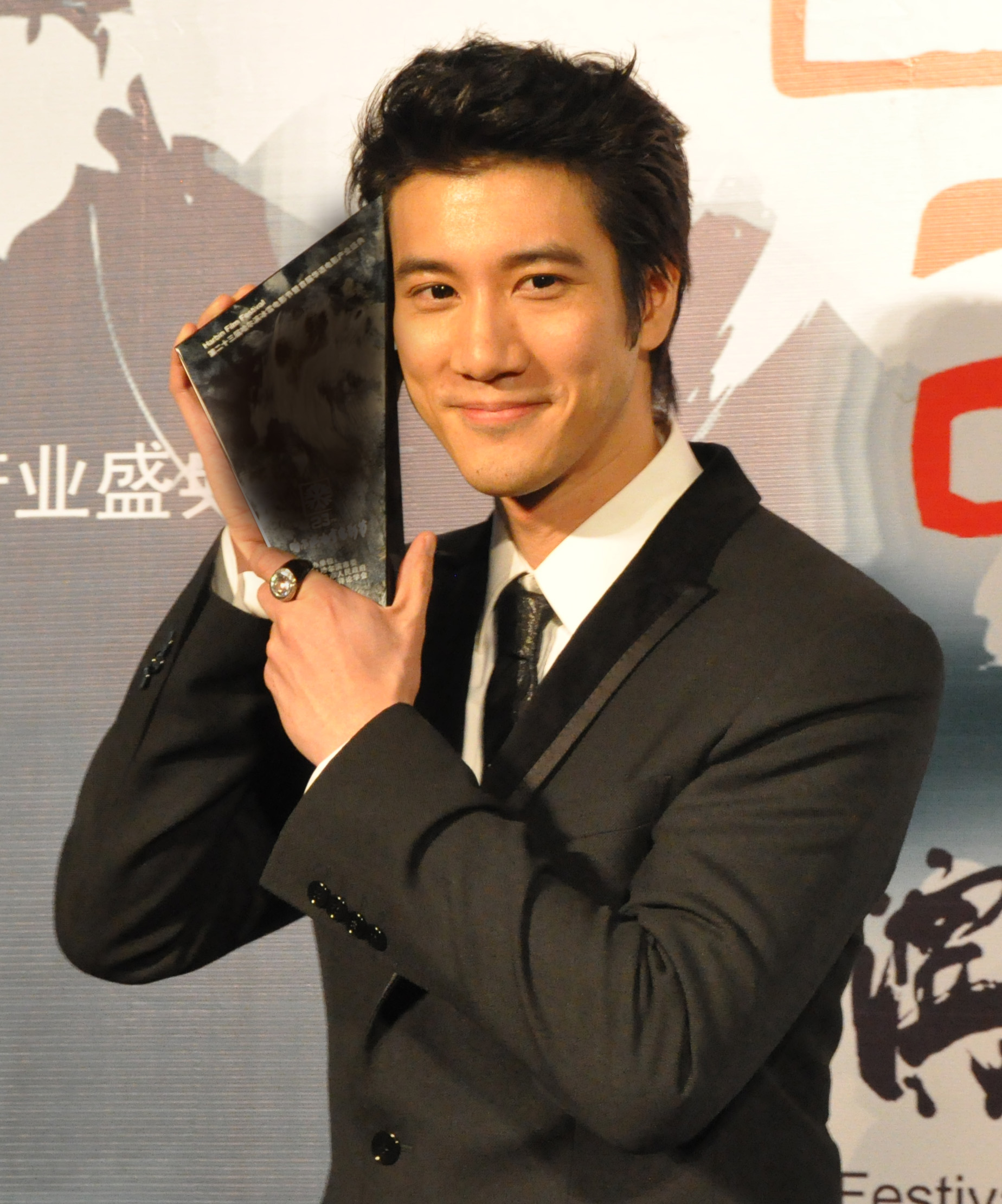
- Wang in 2011
- Studio albums: 18
- Live albums: 4
- Compilation albums: 4

Wang Leehom (Chinese: 王力宏) is an American singer-songwriter based in Taiwan. He has released sixteen Mandarin albums, two Japanese albums, three compilation albums, and fifteen Mandarin, Japanese, and Cantonese singles.

He has contributed to over 10 movie soundtracks and collaborated on several other studio albums, including but not limited to the Asian editions of Tony Bennett's Duets: An American Classic and Kenny G's At Last... The Duets Album. In addition to his own music, Leehom has composed, produced, and had lyrical credits for numerous other musical artists.

== Studio albums ==
=== Mandarin ===
Title	Album details	Peak chart positions		Sales
Title	Album details	TWN	MLY	Sales
Love Rival Beethoven (情敵貝多芬)	Released: December 1, 1995; Label: BMG Music; Formats: CD, cassette	—	—	
If You Heard My Song (如果你聽見我的歌)	Released: August 7, 1996; Label: Decca Records; Formats: CD, cassette	15	—	
Missing You (好想你)	Released: December 17, 1996; Label: Decca Records; Formats: CD, cassette	19	—	
White Paper (白紙)	Released: July 18, 1997; Label: Decca Records; Formats: CD, cassette	8	—	
Revolution (公轉自轉)	Released: August 21, 1998; Label: Sony Music; Formats: CD, cassette	10	—	TWN: 100,000
Impossible to Miss You (不可能錯過你)	Released: June 22, 1999; Label: Sony Music; Formats: CD, cassette	11	10	TWN: 190,000
Forever's First Day (永遠的第一天)	Released: June 5, 2000; Label: Sony Music; Formats: CD, cassette	—	10	TWN: 200,000
The One and Only (唯一)	Released: September 27, 2001; Label: Sony Music; Formats: CD, cassette	—	—	Asia: 1,000,000
Unbelievable (不可思議)	Released: October 15, 2003; Label: Sony Music; Formats: CD, digital download	—	3	Asia: 1,300,000
Shangri-La (心中的日月)	Released: December 31, 2004; Label: Sony BMG; Formats: CD, digital download	—	16	Asia: 2,000,000
Heroes of Earth (蓋世英雄)	Released: December 30, 2005; Label: Sony BMG; Formats: CD, digital download	1	—	Asia: 3,000,000; TWN: 140,000
Change Me (改變自己)	Released: July 13, 2007; Label: Sony BMG; Formats: CD, digital download	1	—	Asia: 2,000,000
Heart Beat (心·跳)	Release: December 26, 2008; Label: Sony Music; Formats: CD, digital download	1	—	Asia: 1,800,000
The 18 Martial Arts (十八般武藝)	Release: August 12, 2010; Label: Sony Music; Formats: CD, digital download	1	—	Asia: 1,600,000
Your Love (你的愛)	Release: January 23, 2015; Label: Homeboy Music, Inc.; Formats: CD, digital download	—	—	
A.I. Love (A.I. 愛)	Release: September 15, 2017; Label: Homeboy Music, Inc.; Formats: CD, digital download	—	—	

=== Japanese ===
Title	Album details	Peak chart positions
Title	Album details	JPN
The Only One (ジ・オンリー・ワン)	Released: April 23, 2003 (JPN); Label: Sony Music; Formats: CD, digital download	—
Hear My Voice	Released: June 23, 2004 (JPN); Label: Sony Music; Formats: CD, digital download	132

== Compilations ==
Album	Album details	Sales
Good Leehom (好力宏)	Released: August 12, 1998 (TWN); Label: Decca Records	TWN: 50,000
Leehom Music Century (王力宏創世紀)	Released: January 1, 2001 (TWN); Label: Sony Music	TWN: 75,000
Evolution (王力宏的音樂進化論)	Released: October 14, 2002 (TWN); Label: Sony Music	TWN: 150,000
Open Fire (火力全開)	Released: September 30, 2011 (TWN); Label: Sony Music	TWN: 300,000

== Live albums ==
Album	Album information
Revolution Live Concert (繞著力宏轉音樂會)	Released: April 1, 1999 (TWN); Label: Sony Music
Impossible to Miss You (不可能錯過你演唱會)	Released: November 18, 1999 (TWN); Label: Sony Music
2006 Heroes of Earth Live Concert (2006 蓋世英雄 Live Concert 演唱會影音全記錄)	Released: August 11, 2006 (TWN); Label: Sony BMG
2008 Music-Man World Tour	Released: September 4, 2009 (TWN); Label: Sony Music

== Singles ==
=== As lead artist ===
==== 1990s ====
Title	Year	Album
"Love Rival Beethoven" (情敌贝多芬)	1995	Love Rival Beethoven
"If You Hear My Song" (如果你听见我的歌)	1996	If You Heard My Song
"Nature" (大地的窗口)	1996	Nature
"Missing You"	1996	Missing You
"White Paper"	1997	White Paper
"I Want to See You Every Second"	1997	White Paper
"Revolution" (公轉自轉)	1998	Revolution
"Love You Love Me" (爱你等于爱自己)	1998	Revolution
"Crying Palm" (流泪手心)	1999	Impossible to Miss You
"Julia"	1999	Impossible to Miss You

==== 2000s ====
Title	Year	Album
"The People of the Dragon"	2000	Forever's First Day
"Don't Be Afraid" (不要害怕)	2000	Forever's First Day
"Take Your Time" (每天愛你廿四小時)	2000	Non-album singles
"Better Than You" (比你更好)	2001	Non-album singles
"The One and Only" (唯一)	2001	The One and Only
"I Only Love You" (爱的就是你)	2001	The One and Only
"Two People Do Not Equal Us" (兩個人不等于我們)	2002	Non-album single
"Last Night" (たった一人の君へ/ラスト・ナイト)	2003	The Only One
"Miracle of Love" (愛の奇跡)	2003	The Only One
"Dream Again"	2004	Shangri-La and Hear My Voice
"Shangri-La" (心中的日月)	2004	Shangri-La
"Kiss Goodbye"	2005	Heroes of Earth
"Finally"	2005	Non-album singles
"Mistakes in the Flower Field" (花田错)	2005	Non-album singles
"As Time Goes By"	2006	Non-album singles
"Falling Leaf Returns to Root" (落葉歸根)	2007	Change Me
"Our Song"	2007	Change Me
"Heartbeat" (心跳)	2008	Heart Beat
"Another Heaven" (另一個天堂) (featuring Jane Zhang)	2008	Heart Beat
"What's Wrong with Rock?" (搖滾怎麼了)	2008	Heart Beat
"One World One Dream" (2008 Olympics)	2008	Non-album single
"Man in the Mirror"	2009	Music Man
"Open Happiness" (暢爽開懷)	2009	Non-album single

==== 2010s ====
Title	Year	Album
"All the Things You Never Knew" (你不知道的事)	2010	The 18 Martial Arts
"Need Someone By Your Side" (需要人陪)	2010	The 18 Martial Arts
"Seven Necessities" (柴米油鹽醬醋茶)	2010	The 18 Martial Arts
"Open Fire" (火力全開)	2011	Open Fire
"Still in Love with You" (依然愛你)	2011	Open Fire
"12 Zodiacs" (十二生肖)	2012	Non-album single
"Lose Myself" (忘我) (featuring Avicii)	2014	Your Love
"Love A Little" (featuring Zhang Ziyi)	2015	Your Love
"Your Love" (你的愛)	2015	Your Love
"Bridge of Fate" (緣分一道橋)	2017	A.I. Love
"Dearest" (亲爱的)	2017	A.I. Love

=== Promotional singles ===
Title	Year	Album
"China White"	2000	China Strike Force OST
"Light of My Life"	2000	China Strike Force OST
"The One I Love is You" (愛的就是你)	2002	Peach Girl OST
"Like a Gunshot"	2002	Spider-Man OST
"Beautiful New World" (美丽新世界)	2002	CCTV New Year's Gala
"I'm Loving It" (我就是喜欢)	2005	McDonald's Theme Song
"Drama of the East" (戲出東方)	2007	Fei Chang You Xi OST
"Stand Up" (站起来)	2008	One Man Olympics OST
"All The Things You Never Knew" (不知道的事)	2010	Love in Disguise OST
"12 Zodiacs" (十二生肖)	2012	12 Zodiacs OST
"Love A Little" (愛一點 )	2013	My Lucky Star OST
"Clash of Kings" (列王的紛爭)	2016	Clash of Kings OST
"Bridge of Fate" (緣分一道橋)	2016	The Great Wall OST
"Listen Love" (聽愛 / 听爱)	2017	Tofu OST
"Hero Goodbye" (再見英雄)	2018	A Better Tomorrow OST

== Featured on Other Artist's Albums ==
As a Singer

- 1999: Cass Pang - Passionate Love (好好愛)
  - Track 3 - "Let Me Feel the Warmth" (讓我取暖)
- 2002: Candy Lo - A Taste of Life (賞味人間)
  - (Disc 2) Track 1 - "Better to be Apart" (好心分手)
- 2005: Kenny G - At Last...The Duets Album (Asian Edition)
  - (Bonus CD) Track 14 - "The One and Only" (唯一)
- 2006: Tony Bennett - Duets: An American Classic (Asian Edition)
  - Track 20 - "If I Ruled the World"
- 2016: Khalil Fong - Journey to the West (西遊記)
  - Track 2 - "Flow"
- 2017: Namewee - Crossover Asia (亞洲通車)
  - Track 2 - "Stranger In The North" (飄向北方)

Composition, Production, and/or Lyrical Credits

- 1999: A-Mei -A-Mei's New Century (妹力新世紀)
  - (CD 1) Track 2 - "Love Will Never Disappear" (愛，永遠不會消失)
- 2002: Karen Mok -[i]
  - Track 4 - "Not Necessarily So' (那可不一定)
- 2003: Ailing Tai -Love's Foolishness (為愛做的傻事)
  - Track 7 - "Passion" (戴愛玲)
- 2003: Various Artists -Hand in Hand (手牵手)
  - Track 7 - "Hand in Hand" (手牵手)
- 2004: A-mei -Maybe Tomorrow (也許明天)
  - Track 2 - "Fire" (火)
- 2005: Fish Leong -Silkroad of Love (丝路)
  - Track 1 - "Silk Road" (絲路)
- 2005: Lim Jeong Hee -Music is my Life
  - Track 11 - "Freedom" (자유) (自由)
- 2005: Jolin Tsai -J-Game
  - Track 9 - "Exclusive Myth" (獨佔神話)
- 2006: SiEn 璽恩 -璽出望外
  - Track 3 - "I'll Love You Forever"
- 2006: Vivian Hsu -Vivi and...
  - Track 10 - "Because of You" (因為你)"
- 2007: Elva Hsiao -1087
  - Track 3 - "Honey Honey Honey"
- 2011: Selina Ren -Dream A New Dream(重作一个梦)
  - Track 3 - "Dream a New Dream (重作一个梦)"
- 2011: Jason Zhang -Closest Place to Heaven (最接近天堂的地方)
  - Track 2 - "First Lady(第一夫人)"
- 2016: Khalil Fong - Journey to the West (西遊記)
  - Track 2 - "Flow"
- 2016: TFBOYS - Jackson Yi (Jackson Yee)'s Single
  - Single - "You Say" (你说)

== Soundtrack Contributions ==
- 1998: The Mask Of Zorro 1998 Chinese OST
  - Track 1 - I Want to Spend My Lifetime Loving You" (我用生命愛妳)
- 2000: China Strike Force Original Movie Soundtrack (雷霆戰警電影原聲帶)
  - Track 3 - China White
  - Track 11 - Light of My Life (Duet with Lara Fabian)
  - Track 12 - Don't Be Afraid (不要害怕)
- 2002: Music from and Inspired by Spider-Man (Asian Edition)
  - Track 20 - Like a Gunshot
- 2006: Life is a Game Original Soundtrack (愛情攻略原聲大碟)
  - Track 2 - Finally
  - Track 3 - Ai Qing Gong Lue (愛情攻略)
  - Track 4 - Wanting to Love (想愛)
  - Track 5 - Finally (Instrumental)
- 2008: 2008 Beijing Olympics
  - Beijing Welcomes You (北京欢迎你)
  - Light the Passion, Share the Dream (点燃激情 传递梦想) [Torch Lightning Song]
  - One World One Dream
  - Stand Up (站起来)

== Duets ==
- With Various Artists
  - "Welcome to Beijing" (北京欢迎你)
  - "A Date with the Future" (和未來有約)
  - "We Are the World"
  - "Hand in Hand" (手牵手)
  - "Because Love Is in the Heart" (愛因為在心中)
- With David Tao, Daniel Chen, Nicholas Tse and Eason Chan
  - "Please Raise Your Head" (請你抬頭)
- With Mavis Fan
  - "Snow Man" (雪人)
  - "Original World" (原來的世界)
- With Mindy Orr
  - "I Want to Spend My Lifetime Loving You" (我用生命愛妳)
- With TM Network, Tetsuya Komuro, Julio Iglesias Jr. and Sheila E
  - "Happiness x 3 Loneliness x 3"
- With Cass Phang
  - "Let Me Feel the Warmth" (讓我取暖)
- With Lara Fabian
  - "Light of My Life"
- With William So
  - "Zuo You Wei Nan" (左右為難)
- With Karen Mok
  - "That May Not Be" (那可不一定)
- With Gackt
  - "December's Love Song" (12月のLove Song)
- With Candy Lo
  - "Better to Be Apart" (好心分手)
- With Kelly Chen
  - "True Colors"
  - "Walking on Sunshine"
- With Kenny G
  - "The One and Only" (唯一)
- With Rain and Lim Jeong Hee
  - "The Perfect Interaction" (完美的互動)
- With Jin
  - "Heroes of Earth" (蓋世英雄)
- With Nirace Ni
  - "Wanting to Love" (想愛)
- With Tony Bennett
  - "If I Ruled the World"
- With Selina Ren from S.H.E
  - "You Are a Song in My Heart" (你是我心內的一首歌)
- With Jane Zhang
  - "Another Heaven" (另一個天堂)
- With Avicii
  - "Lose Myself" (忘我)
- With Weiwei Tan
  - "Bridge of Fate" (緣分一道橋)
- With Zhang Ziyi
  - "Love a Little"(愛一點)
- With Namewee
  - "Stranger In The North" (飄向北方)
- With Khalil Fong
  - "Flow"
- With Stefanie Sun
  - "Light the Passion, Share the Dream" (點燃激情 傳遞夢想)
- With Jackie Chan, Han Hong, Stephanie Sun
  - "Stand up" (站起来)
- With Yu Quan
  - "Beautiful New Word" (美丽新世界)
- With Joey Yung, Sun Nan, Stephanie Sun
  - Let's Be Friends (相親相愛)

== Others ==
- 1996: Nature (大地的窗口)
  - Track 1 - "Nature"
- 2006: Sony Ericsson - Wei Ni Er Sheng (Limited Edition) 为你而声(限定盘)
  - Track 1 - "Mistakes in the Flower Field" (花田错) (Remix)
  - Track 2 - "Kiss Goodbye" (Instrumental)
- 2006: Sony Ericsson - Yin Yue Chuang Zuo Live CD (音樂創作 Live CD)
  - Track 1 - "Heroes of Earth" (蓋世英雄)
  - Track 2 - "Shangri-La" (心中的日月)
  - Track 3 - "A Simple Song" (一首簡單的歌)
  - Track 4 - "Julia"
  - Track 5 - "Impossible to Miss You" (不可能錯過你)
  - Track 6 - "The One and Only" (唯一)
