= List of awards and nominations received by Wang Leehom =

This is an incomplete list of awards and nominations received by Chinese-American Mandopop artist Wang Leehom.

== Golden Lotus Awards ==
The Golden Lotus Awards (Macau International Movie & Television Festival) (Chinese: 金蓮花獎/金莲花奖; pinyin: Jīn liánhuā jiǎng) are presented by Macau Film and Television Media Association and China International Cultural Communication Center. It recognizes Excellence in film and television.

Year	Number	Category	Nomination	Result	Ref.
2018	10th	Best Actor	Forever Young (Chinese title: 無問西東)	Won	

== Golden Melody Awards ==
The Golden Melody Awards (Chinese: 金曲獎; pinyin: Jīn Qǔ Jiǎng) are presented annually by the Government Information Office of the Republic of China (Taiwan). It recognises achievement in music production and is M-pop's equivalent to the Grammy Awards.

Year	Number	Category	Nomination	Result	Ref.
1999	10th	Best Album of the Year	Revolution	Nominated	
1999	10th	Best Album Producer	Wang Leehom and Li Zhenquan for Revolution	Won	
1999	10th	Best Male Mandarin Artist	Wang Leehom for Revolution	Won	
2000	11th	Best Composer	Wang Leehom for "流淚手心" (Crying Palms)	Nominated	
2000	11th	Best Male Mandarin Artist	Wang Leehom for Impossible to Miss You	Nominated	
2001	12th	Best Male Mandarin Artist	Wang Leehom for Forever's First Day	Nominated	
2002	13th	Best Male Mandarin Artist	Wang Leehom for The One and Only	Nominated	
2003	14th	Best Musical Arranger	Wang Leehom for "W-H-Y"	Nominated	
2004	15th	Best Album Producer	Wang Leehom for Unbelievable	Won	
2004	15th	Best Male Mandarin Artist	Wang Leehom for Unbelievable	Nominated	
2005	16th	Best Musical Arranger	Wang Leehom for "竹林深處" (In the Depths of the Bamboo Forest)	Nominated	
2005	16th	Best Male Mandarin Artist	Wang Leehom for Shangri-La	Nominated	
2006	17th	Best Male Mandarin Artist	Wang Leehom for Heroes of Earth	Won	
2009	20th	Best Musical Arranger	Wang Leehom for "我完全沒有任何理由理你" (No Reason to Pay Attention to You)	Nominated	
2009	20th	Best Male Mandarin Artist	Wang Leehom for Heart Beat	Nominated	
2011	22nd	Best Song of the Year	"你不知道的事" (All The Things You Never Knew)	Nominated	
2011	22nd	Best Mandarin Album	The 18 Martial Arts	Nominated	
2011	22nd	Best Male Mandarin Artist	Wang Leehom for The 18 Martial Arts	Nominated	

== Chinese Music Awards ==
The Chinese Music Awards (Chinese: 中國歌曲排行榜 or 中歌榜) are presented annually by Beijing Music Radio. It is one of mainland China's equivalents to the Grammy Awards.

Year	Category	Ref.
2003	Best Singer-Songwriter	
2007	Most Popular Male Singer	
2007	Best Producer	
2007	Song of the Year	
2009	Most Popular Male Singer	
2009	Best Composer	
2009	Best Producer	
2009	Best All-Around Artist	
2009	Song of the Year	
2010	Best Male Artist	
2010	Best Producer	

== HITO Radio Music Awards ==
The HITO Radio Music Awards (Chinese: HITO流行音樂獎) are given annually by HITO Radio, the parent company of Taiwanese radio station Hit FM. The order is not specified for the Top 10 Songs of the Year.

Year	Category	Nomination	Result	Ref.
2007	Top 10 Songs of the Year	"Kiss goodbye"	Won	
2007	Longest Number 1 Album	Heroes of Earth	Won	
2007	Best Male Singer	Wang Leehom	Won	
2008	Top 10 Songs of the Year	"你是我心內的一首歌" (You Are a Song in My Heart)	Won	
2008	Popular Online Premiere Song	"落葉歸根" (Falling Leaf Returns to Roots)	Won	
2008	Best Singer-Songwriter	Wang Leehom jointly with Jay Chou	Won	
2008	Best Male Singer	Wang Leehom	Won	

== 1996 ==
- Best New Artist of 1996, The People's Daily Newspaper, Taiwan
- Best New Artist of 1996, Push Magazine, Taiwan

== 1998 ==
- Top 20 of 1998, Channel V: "Revolution" (公轉自轉)
- 10 Best Albums of the Year, News Media Group, Malaysia: "Revolution" (公轉自轉)
- 10 Best Albums of the Year, Chinese Musicians' Association, Taiwan: "Revolution" (公轉自轉)

== 1999 ==
- Best Producer, Golden Melody Awards, Taiwan: "Revolution" (公轉自轉)
- Best Male Vocalist, Golden Melody Awards, Taiwan: "Revolution" (公轉自轉)
- Best Producer, Golden Melody Awards, Singapore: "Revolution" (公轉自轉)

== 2000 ==
- Best New Male Artist, HK Radio Station
- Top 20 of 1999, Channel V: "Julia"
- 10 Best Albums of the Year, Chinese Musicians' Association: "Impossible to Miss You" (不可能錯過妳)
- Top 10 Songs of the Year, Chinese Musicians' Association: "Crying Palm" (流淚手心)
- Best Male Vocalist, MTV Asia
- Best Composer, Golden Melody Awards, Malaysia: "Impossible to Miss You" (不可能錯過妳)
- Best Male Vocalist, Golden Melody Awards, Malaysia: "Impossible to Miss You" (不可能錯過妳)
- Best Male Performer, 1st Asia Chinese Music Awards
- Best Composer, 1st Asia Chinese Music Awards
- Top 15 Hits, 1st Asia Chinese Music Awards

== 2001 ==
- Top 20 of 2000, Channel V: "Forever's First Day" (永遠的第一天)
- Best Singer-Songwriter, Channel V
- Best Song, MTV Asia: "The One and Only" (唯一)
- Best Song, CCTV-MTV Asia: "Descendents of the Dragon" (龍的傳人)
- Best Composer-Artist, Golden Melody Awards, Malaysia: "The One and Only" (唯一)
- Best Producer, Golden Melody Awards, Malaysia: "The One and Only" (唯一)
- Top 10 Songs, Golden Melody Awards, Malaysia: "The One and Only" (唯一)
- Soaring Artists, 23rd Annual RTHK Music Award; Bronze
- All China Most Popular Artist, 23rd Annual RTHK Music Award; Silver
- Best Composer, 1st Global Chinese Music Awards

== 2002 ==
- Best Male Vocalist, CCTV-MTV Asia
- Top 20 Songs, CCTV-MTV Asia: "The One and Only" (唯一)
- Best Composer-Artist, Golden Melody Awards, Malaysia: "The One and Only" (唯一)
- Best Lyricist, Golden Melody Awards, Malaysia: "The One and Only" (唯一)
- Best Mandarin Song: "The One and Only" (唯一), TVB Jade Solid Gold Music Awards
- Outstanding Performance, TVB Jade Solid Gold Music Awards; Silver

== 2003 ==
- Most Popular Male Artist, HITO Music Awards 2003
- Best Song of the Year, HITO Music Awards 2003: "W-H-Y"
- Longest No. 1 Song, HITO Music Awards 2003: "W-H-Y"
- Best Music Video, Channel V: "Two People Do Not Equal to Us" (兩個人不等於我們)
- Top 10 Songs of the Year, Chinese Musicians' Association: "Love, Love, Love"
- Top 10 Albums of the Year, Chinese Musicians' Association: Unbelievable (不可思議)
- Top 10 Albums of the Year, China Times: Unbelievable: (不可思議)
- Media's Choice Artist, Channel V
- Top Fashion Trendsetter, Cosmopolitan, China
- Top 10 Songs of the Year, HiTFM, "You're Not Here" (妳不在), and "The One and Only" (Japanese version) (唯一) (日文版)
- Most Popular Composer, 3rd Global Chinese Music Awards
- Top 20 Hits, 3rd Global Chinese Music Awards: "Two People Do Not Equal to Us" (兩個人不等於我們)

== 2004 ==
- Best Male Singer Award, Channel V
- DJ's Favorite Album, HITO Music Awards: "Unbelievable" (不可思議)
- Top 10 Songs of the Year, HITO Music Awards 2004: "You're Not Here" (你不在)
- 10 Best Albums of the Year: "Unbelievable" (不可思議)
- Most Popular Asian Male Singer, Golden Melody Awards, Singapore: "Unbelievable" (不可思議)
- The Best Songs of the Year, Golden Melody Awards, Singapore: "Love Is Everywhere" (愛無所不在)
- 10 Best Albums of the Year, Dong Xi Nan Bei Da Sheu Sheng Awards: "Unbelievable" (不可思議)
- Favorite Asian Artist, Channel V, Thailand
- Most Popular Composer, 4h Global Chinese Music Awards
- Best Album, 4h Global Chinese Music Awards: "Unbelievable" (不可思議)
- Top 20 Hits, 4h Global Chinese Music Awards: "You're Not Here" (你不在)
- Buzz Asia Taiwan, MTV Video Music Awards, Japan: "Last Night"

== 2005 ==
- Most Popular Male Artists, 5th Global Chinese Music Awards.
- Top 5 Most Popular Artists, 5th Global Chinese Music Awards
- Top 25 Hits, 5th Global Chinese Music Awards; "The Heart's Sun and Moon" (心中的日月)
- Best Music Composition, 5th Global Chinese Music Awards: "Forever Love"
- Most Popular Regional Artist, 12th Singapore Hits Award

== 2006 ==
- Best Male Artist, HITO Music Awards 2006
- Best Music Arrangement, HITO Music Awards 2006
- The Most Popular Voted Composing Artist, HITO Music Awards 2006
- Top 10 Songs of the Year, HITO Music Awards 2006: "The Heart's Sun and Moon" (心中的日月)
- Most Popular Chinese Singer: 13th EDC Dong Fang Feng Yun Bang Awards (Taiwan Area)
- Favorite Mandarin Song, TVB Jade Solid Gold Selection: "Kiss Goodbye"
- Best Composer Song, MusicRadio Awards: "Mistake in the Flower Fields" (花田錯)
- Best Taiwan Male Singer, MusicRadio Awards
- Best Producer, MusicRadio Awards
- Favorite Artist Taiwan, MTV Asia Awards
- Top 20 Hits, 6th Global Chinese Music Awards: "Kiss Goodbye"
- Best Producer, 6th Global Chinese Music Awards: "Heroes of Earth" (蓋世英雄)

== 2007 ==
- Best Endorser, 1st Mobile Oscar 2007
- Best Composing Singer (Hong Kong & Taiwan Area), 13th Chinese Music Awards
- Most Popular Male Artist (Hong Kong & Taiwan Area), 13th Chinese Music Awards
- Most Popular Song of the Year (Hong Kong & Taiwan Area), 13th Chinese Music Awards: "Big City, Small Love" (大城小愛)
- Top 10 Albums of the Year, KKBOX Music Charts: "Heroes of Earth" (蓋世英雄)
- Top 20 Songs of the Year, KKBOX Music Charts: "Kiss Goodbye"

== 2011 ==
- Most Valuable New Director, Wang Leehom for Love in Disguise, 23rd Annual Harbin Film Festival

== 2012 ==
- Best Asian Artist, 2012 Mnet Asian Music Awards
