= Love in Disguise =

Love in Disguise may refer to:

- Love in Disguise (film), a 2010 Chinese musical film directed by Wang Leehom
- Love in disguise, a traditional British dish of stuffed heart
