= Open Fire =

Open Fire may refer to:

== Film and TV ==
- Open Fire (1994 film), a 1994 British television film based on the shooting of Stephen Waldorf
- Open Fire (1989 film), an American action film
- Open Fire, a 1994 film with Jeff Wincott

== Music ==
- Open Fire (Ronnie Montrose album), 1978
- Open Fire (Y&T album), 1985
- Open Fire (Alabama Thunderpussy album), 2007
- "Ana's Song (Open Fire)", a 1999 song by Silverchair
- Open Fire, a 2011 album by Leehom Wang
- "Open Fire", a 1994 song by Gotthard from Dial Hard
- "Open Fire", a 2003 song by Krokus from Rock the Block
- "Open Fire", a 2015 song by The Darkness from Last of Our Kind

== Other uses ==
- Open Fire (horse) (1961–1980), American Thoroughbred champion racehorse
- Openfire, an XMPP server (formerly known as Wildfire)
