= Hear My Voice (disambiguation) =

Hear My Voice is a 2004 album by Leehom Wang, as well as its title track. The phrase may also refer to:

- "Hear My Voice", a 2020 song by Celeste from the soundtrack to the film The Trial of the Chicago 7
- "Hear My Voice", a song by Jeremy Camp from the 2004 album Carried Me
