= Hou Dejian =

Taiwanese singer and songwriter (born 1956)

- 侯德健
- Born: October 1, 1956 (age 69); Gangshan, Kaohsiung, Taiwan, Republic of China
- Citizenship: Republic of China; New Zealand; People's Republic of China (1983–1990)
- Education: National Chengchi University
- Occupations: Singer, songwriter, scholar
- Notable work: Descendants of the Dragon

Hou Dejian
- Chinese: 侯德健
Transcriptions
Standard Mandarin
- Hanyu Pinyin: Hóu Déjiàn
- Gwoyeu Romatzyh: Hour Derjiann
- Wade–Giles: Hou Te-Chien
Yue: Cantonese
- Yale Romanization: Hàuh Dāk-gihn
- Jyutping: Hau^{4} Dak^{1}-gin^{6}

Hou Dejian (Chinese: 侯德健; pinyin: Hóu Déjiàn; Wade–Giles: Hou Te-Chien, Cantonese: Hau Dak-gin, born October 1, 1956) is a songwriter, composer, and singer from Taiwan.

Since the 1980s, his songs have been popular in mainland China, Taiwan and Hong Kong. His songs are written mostly in Chinese, with a few in English. The lyrics often reflect traditional Chinese thought, combined with a contemporary mentality.

In 1978, Hou Dejian wrote a song entitled "Descendants of the Dragon", with which he gained significant popularity. He left Taiwan for mainland China in 1983, despite the ban for the visit from the Republic of China (ROC) government on Taiwan. He then witnessed and became a part of the hunger strike with three others in the Tiananmen Square protests of 1989 pro-democracy movement in Beijing. They have been called 'Four men of honour' (四君子).

== Early life ==
Hou was raised in a military dependents' village in Gangshan, Kaohsiung. His parents were from Sichuan and Hunan.

Hou became famous for his 1978 song Descendants of the Dragon. In the song, Hou expressed his view of his Chinese identity.

In 1983, Hou left Taiwan to go to the People's Republic of China (PRC), despite the ban on such travel by the ROC. His songs were popular in the PRC, where they were viewed as patriotic.

== June 2 hunger strike declaration ==
On June 2 Liu Xiaobo, Zhou Duo, and Gao Xin joined Hou Dejian in Tiananmen Square to announce their hunger strike in support of the student movement. A popular singer in China, Hou Dejian stated "music played a very important role during the movement. When someone takes part in a rock concert, that kind of crazy feeling is all about self-liberation and about self-expression." Together, the "four gentlemen" wrote a declaration that urged the Chinese people to uphold their "duty as responsible citizens" by sustaining a "peaceful democratization process." They declared, "in this combat of opposing political cultures, of character cultivation and of moral strength, the hunger strikers intend to use their wisdom and actions to make the government feel shamed, to admit and correct its wrongdoings." The hope of the declaration was to create a transformation in government that would be rooted in democratic principles, rather than the authoritarian model in place. While the construction of the declaration was a means of encouraging the student movement, it also criticized the students for failing to follow the democratic principles they claimed to value. This announcement from Hou Dejian and the others troubled high-ranking officials within the party, playing a definitive role in the government's decision on June 3 to approve a violent crackdown.

== Role in evacuating the square on June 4 ==
Amidst the chaos in the morning of June 4 the four men decided that they had to take responsibility for the students in the square. Although Zhou Duo had volunteered to go out to seek the cooperation of the soldiers, he realised that Hou Dejian was the only person that the soldiers might know of. Together, Hou and the others met with a political commissar and said, "We volunteer to take all the students out of the square and ask the PLA not to open fire. Please give us enough time to organise an evacuation." After the government accepted Hou's request, Hou and Zhou Duo rushed to the monument to announce that the command post had agreed to the evacuation of the square. The crowd of students was initially reluctant to leave the square. However, with the help of Feng Congde, Hou Dejian and the student leaders were able to usher the students away.

== Life as a dissident ==
After the 1989 events at Tiananmen, Hou Dejian disappeared from the public eye to avoid the crackdown on so called "counterrevolutionaries" who had participated in the protest. While rumors swirled of his whereabouts, Hou had taken refuge in the Australian embassy, and spent 72 days under its protection, during which he told Australian embassy staff what had occurred at the square. Following his emergence out of hiding, Hou gave an interview to media discussing his role in the evacuation of the square. He stated: "During the whole withdrawal process I didn't see a single student, either citizen or soldier killed in the square. Nor did I see any armored personnel carriers rolling over people." Contradicting student leaders like Chai Ling and appearing to take the Chinese government's side of the story, Hou was aware that his interview would cause outrage among many protesters, and he was correct. Although the news release was clearly "slanted" in order to emphasize that no one had been killed in the clearing of the square, he questioned the people who had thought he was lying about his story. Hou asked: "are we going to use lies to attack an enemy who lies? Aren't facts powerful enough? To tell lies against our enemy's lies only satisfies our need to vent our anger, but it's a dangerous thing to do."

Through interviews with foreign media, Hou took a much more critical approach of the government. According to the Wall Street Journal, among the 1.1 billion people in China in 1990, Hou Dejian was the only individual to utter "in public the criticisms of the state that many Chinese share[d] but dare not speak." Andrew Higgins, a Beijing correspondent for the Independent, a British daily, stated that Hou was "the only real interview in town." China initially accepted his opposition, giving the impression that those who challenged the state would not face consequences. However, on June 1, 1990, Hou, along with Gao Xin and Zhou Duo, cancelled a news conference in which they intended to speak up against the government. According to Linda Jaivin, the news conference was intended to reaffirm Hou and the others' "commitment to the principles of rationality, tolerance, and non-violence." It also acted as a petition for the release of Liu Xiaobo and other so called black hands that took part in the 1989 protests. When reporters arrived at Hou's home, they found a written message stating that he had cancelled the conference due to personal matters. Prior to the news conference the three dissidents were detained, forcing Hou Dejian to negotiate the terms of their release with authorities. When the government promised not to detain the three dissidents, Hou agreed to be deported to Taiwan. After his deportation Hou moved to New Zealand and began writing books and screenplays.

== Later career ==
Hou relocated to Beijing in 2006. In 2011, he was granted a permit to perform in a concert. In an interview that year, Hou stated, "Human rights in China are not what I am most concerned about now".

In 2018 Hou wrote the tune for a song called Chinese Dream (Chinese: 中国梦; pinyin: Zhōngguó mèng), with lyrics by Jiang Kairu (蒋开儒), which was performed for the first time at a ceremony at Zhengding High School in Hebei. The song refers to the concept of the Chinese Dream promoted by Xi Jinping, current General Secretary of the Chinese Communist Party.

== Albums ==
《龍的傳人續篇》The Descendants of the Dragon II(1983)

1. 《潮州人》"ChaoZhou People"
2. 《給新生代》"To New Generation"
3. 《龍的傳人續篇》"The Descendants of the Dragon II"
4. 《把自己唱出來》"Sing to Express Yourself"
5. 《好像》"As If"
6. 《高速公路》"High Way"

《新鞋子舊鞋子》New Shoes and Old Shoes(1984)

1. "Well I Need To Be Alone"
2. 《趁你還年輕》"While You Are Still Young"
3. 《歌詞·一九八三》"Lyric 1983"
4. 《歸去來兮》"Come to Return"
5. 《你和我的明天》"Tomorrow of Yours and Mine"
6. 《我們都曾經年少》"We Are All Once Young"
7. 《新鞋子舊鞋子》"New Shoes and Old Shoes"
8. 《熊貓咪咪》"Panda Mimi"
9. 《就讓它像一首歌》"Let it be a Song"
10. 《酒干倘賣無》"Any Wine Empty Bottles for Sale"
11. 《未來的主人翁》"The Masters of the Future"

《三十以後才明白》Only Understand it After 30 Years Old(1988)

1. 《三十以後才明白》"Only Understand it After 30 Years Old"
2. 《一樣的》"The Same"
3. 《寂寞難耐》"Hard to Stand Being Alone"
4. 《我愛》"I Love"
5. 《出走》"Escape Away"
6. 《喂, 老張》"Hi Old Zhang"
7. 《家》"Home"

《下去不》Get Off or Not(1990)

1. 《下去不》"Get Off or Not"
2. 《一顆小小的石頭》"A Little Stone"
3. 《今天是什麼天氣》"What Weather Today"
4. 《漂亮的中國人》"Pretty Chinese People"
5. "To Dream The Broken Dream"
6. 《我們要活下去》"We Must Live On"
7. 《不是我們年紀小》"Not Because We Are Too Young"
8. 《卅歲以後》"After the Age of 30"
9. 《龍的傳人》"The Descendants of the Dragon" (Long De Chuan Ren)
10. 《再梦一遍》"Dream Again"
