= Your Love (Wang Leehom album) =

Your Love. (你的愛。)

Studio album by Leehom Wang
- Released: January 23, 2015
- Genre: Mandopop
- Label: Homeboy Music Inc.
- Producer: Leehom Wang

Leehom Wang chronology
Open Fire 火力全開 (2011)	Your Love. (你的愛。) (2015)	A.I. Love (A.I. 愛) (2017)

Your Love (Chinese: 你的愛; pinyin: nǐ de ài) is the 15th album of American-born Chinese singer-songwriter, Leehom Wang. The album was released on 23 January 2015 through Homeboy Music Inc. The first release since 2011's studio compilation album "Open Fire", "Your Love" focuses on love and its many stages, ranging from heartbreak to elation.

Wang describes the album like this in an interview: “The concept of the album is the stages of love, and there are thirteen songs, so it’s like thirteen chapters of love. It starts with the loss of love to the moment of a break-up, to heartbreak, to trying to forget, to being able to slowly pick yourself back together and move on, to getting to know God, to meeting the one, to protecting the one you love.”

== Track listing ==
1. 前奏 Intro (0:45)
2. 天翻地覆 Earth and Heaven Overturned (4:01)
3. 裂心 Cracked Heart (4:24)
4. 忘我 (with Avicii) Lose Myself (4:46)
5. 你的愛 Your Love (3:51)
6. 就是現在 Now Is The Time (4:31)
7. 七十億分之一 7 Billion To One (3:49)
8. In Your Eyes (4:00)
9. 保護 Protect (3:43)
10. 夢寐以求 Dream Life (4:24)
11. 微博控 Weibo Song (3:05)
12. 愛一點 (feat. 章子怡) Love A Little (5:07)
13. 忘我（抒情版）Lose Myself (Ballad Version) (4:29)
