= China Strike Force =

2000 Hong Kong film by Stanley Tong

- Hong Kong poster
- Traditional Chinese: 雷霆戰警
- Simplified Chinese: 雷霆战警
- Hanyu Pinyin: Lèi Tìng Zhàn Jǐng
- Jyutping: Leoi4 Ting1 Zin3 Ging2
- Directed by: Stanley Tong
- Written by: Steven Whitney; Stanley Tong
- Produced by: Andre E. Morgan; Barbie Tung
- Starring: Aaron Kwok; Norika Fujiwara; Leehom Wang; Ruby Lin; Coolio; Mark Dacascos; Paul Chun
- Cinematography: Jeffrey C. Mygatt
- Edited by: Pietro Cecchini; Keung Chuen-tak; Yau Chi-wai
- Music by: Nathan Wang
- Production companies: Astoria Films; CMC Magnetics Corporation; China International Entertainment Limited; Golden Harvest Company
- Distributed by: Golden Scene (Hong Kong); Tai Seng Video Marketing (United States)
- Release date: 21 December 2000
- Running time: 103 minutes
- Country: Hong Kong
- Languages: Cantonese; English (dubbed)
- Box office: HK$20,513,906

China Strike Force is a 2000 Hong Kong action film starring Aaron Kwok, Norika Fujiwara, Leehom Wang and Ruby Lin alongside American stars Mark Dacascos and Coolio. It was directed by Stanley Tong and written by Tong and Steven Whitney.

== Synopsis ==
Mainland China police officers Alex Lee and Darren Tong are working on a routine mission. However, miscommunication between the duo causes Alex to "die" when he is hit with a paintball to the head. The commanding officer commends the duo for trying their hardest, but they have to learn to work as both a team and separate units. Alex has a girlfriend, fashion designer Ruby, who is preparing a fashion show for her latest line. Meanwhile, Uncle Ma, an elder gang boss at the event, is about to score a major deal with a Japanese woman named Norika. Ma's nephew Tony speaks to Uncle Ma about having a friend come in to discuss business involving drugs. Uncle Ma does not deal with drugs and tells Tony that out of respect, he will meet with his friend, but will also deny his proposal.

At the fashion show, Darren locks eyes with Norika, who despite sitting next to Tony, seems to have a bit of interest in Darren as well. A mysterious man named Coolio is also at the event and signals one of the waiters, Lee. Lee takes a knife and stabs Chong, one of Uncle Ma's subordinates, in the neck. Darren catches Lee and the two engage in a fight that takes them outside and onto a double decker bus. Norika walks towards Chong's body and grabs a disc from his pocket. Alex, noticing the theft, follows Norika to her hotel and finds her. He has police surround her, but she escapes when she grabs Alex by his tie and jumps to the lower floor, nearly taking him down in the process. Meanwhile, Darren catches up to Lee on a bridge. Surrounded, Lee jumps off the bridge and is supposedly dead.

As Alex and Darren attempt to find out why both Chong is dead and Norika stole the disc, it is revealed that Lee is Coolio's bodyguard and Coolio is the friend who Tony plans to introduce to Uncle Ma to start the drug market. When Lee demands the money for his killing Chong, Coolio shoots and kills him. As the duo begin to hatch a plan to start the drug market, Norika gets herself involved with the villainous duo as well. While working out a plan at a hot tub, Coolio suspects Norika not be who she seems to be. However, to prove herself, Norika strips down to nothing to show no wire. Tony trusts Noriko but Coolio still has his doubts. At the long-awaited meeting, Uncle Ma respectfully declines Coolio's offer to smuggle drugs in the market and suggests to Tony that the old man must die.

When Norika looks for Uncle Ma, she finds his body and is caught by Alex and Darren. As Alex and Darren interrogate Noriko, Darren finds himself flirting with her much to the chagrin of Alex. However, Norika reveals her true nature. She is a Japanese Interpol agent who has come to China to track down her partner's killer, who turns out to be Coolio. She had used Uncle Ma because she knows that Coolio will want to get to Uncle Ma. However, as Norika is released, she seems flirty with Darren until she rebuffs him.

Norika meets up with Tony and Coolio with Coolio admitting he set Noriko up to test her and she passed. However, Sheriff Lin, Ruby's father and Alex and Darren's superior, has arrived as well. He has been in cahoots with Tony and Coolio for a share of the money that the drugs will bring in. Sheriff Lin promises not to rat out Tony if he gets some more money so he can retire. When Tony agrees, Sheriff Lin informs Tony and Coolio that Norika is Japanese Interpol. Alex and Darren show up in time and a major fight ensues with Sheriff Lin getting shot by Coolio. Darren takes on members of Tony's gang, Norika goes one on one against Coolio, but Alex is outmatched by Tony, whose martial arts skills are impeccable. Darren arrives to save Alex, but proves to be too late as Coolio kills Alex by shooting him down. Coolio and Tony hop on to a helicopter and try to escape, but Alex and Norika go after the duo on bike to the helicopter. In the melee, Tony is killed and the helicopter crashes on a building, forcing Darren, Norika, and Coolio on a glass pane. Darren and Norika fight Coolio until Darren drop kicks Coolio to his near death. Pleading for his life, Darren attempts to help Coolio. However, the car which hang by the helicopter crashes down on the pane, killing Coolio.

The next day, Darren meets Ruby at the airport as she is leaving. Darren gives her a present, an engagement ring Alex had intended to give her before his death. Ruby is sad yet grateful to Alex for the ring. As Ruby leaves, Darren meets up with Norika and it is clear the two are attempting to start a relationship together.

== Production ==
China Strike Force was shot in both Cantonese and English. The director Stanley Tong shot the film in Shanghai as it was cheaper than shooting in Hong Kong and also wanted to know mainland China better.

== Cast ==
- Aaron Kwok as Darren Tong
- Norika Fujiwara as Norika
- Coolio as Coolio
- Mark Dacascos as Tony Lau
- Alexander Leehom Wang as Alex Cheung
- Ruby Lin as Ruby Lin
- Paul Chun as Sheriff Lin
- Lau Siu-ming as Uncle Ma
- Ken Lo as Ken
- Jennifer Lin as Jennifer
- Kim Won-Jin as Lee (Coolio's bodyguard)
- Tony Wang as Mr. Leuong (Sheriff Lin's assistant)
- Benny Lai as Chong
- Jackson Lau as Trainer leader at academy
- Paul Cheng as Hotel receptionist
- Lee Hok-tung as Uncle Wong

== Release ==
China Strike Force was released on 21 December 2000 in Hong Kong where it grossed a total of HK$20,513,906. At the 20th Annual Hong Kong Film Awards, the film was nominated for Best New Performer (Leehom Wang), Best Action Choreography (Stanley Tong and Ailen Sit) and Best Sound Design (Paul Pirola).
