= Love in disguise =

British dish

Love in disguise is a British dish of stuffed lamb, pig or calf heart. It is cooked by stuffing a calf's heart, surrounded by an inch of forcemeat, then rolled in vermicelli and finally baked in an oven. The dish can be served with its own gravy. It was first noticed in Kettner's Book of the Table 1887.
