= Change Me (album) =

Change Myself (改變自己)

Studio album by Leehom Wang
- Released: July 13, 2007 (Taiwan); July 19, 2007(Thailand)
- Genre: C-pop, R&B, rock
- Label: Sony BMG
- Producer: Leehom Wang

Leehom Wang chronology
Heroes of Earth (蓋世英雄) (2005)	Change Myself (改變自己) (2007)	Heart Beat (心·跳) (2008)

Change Me (simplified Chinese: 改变自己; traditional Chinese: 改變自己; pinyin: Gǎibìan Zìjǐ) is the 12th album of the Taiwanese American R&B artist and composer, Leehom Wang, and was released on July 13, 2007. The album sold more than one million copies within the first month of release.

The track "You Are a Song in My Heart" (你是我心内的一首歌), a duet with Selina of S.H.E, won one of the "Top 10 Songs of the Year" at the 2008 HITO Radio Music Awards. The album was awarded one of the Top 10 Selling Mandarin Albums of the Year at the 2007 IFPI Hong Kong Album Sales Awards, presented by the Hong Kong branch of IFPI.

== About the album ==
Through this album, Leehom promotes the idea of global awareness in the environment and social awareness as well. In the title track, "Change Me" (改變自己), he sings that single individuals have the power to make a difference in the world and each difference can make the world a better place. The album was printed on recycled paper, contained minimal amount of plastics, and includes a page in the liner notes listing ten things ordinary listeners can do to save the environment. Some album editions also include limited edition Leehom's chopsticks with a small tote bag, encouraging listeners to use these reusable chopsticks instead of wasting the disposable wooden chopsticks found in many restaurants.

Inspired by Ang Lee's Lust, Caution, in which he played the role of Kuang Yu Min, Leehom composed "Falling Leaf Returns to Root" (落葉歸根). The composer of "Falling Leaf Returns to Root" is listed in his album as Kuang Yu Min instead of Leehom Wang. This album also features a duet with S.H.E's Selina Jen, "You Are the Song in My Heart", that sees Leehom singing in the Taiwanese dialect for the first time.

== Track listing ==
1. Intro*
2. "Change Myself" (改變自己 Gǎibìan Zìjǐ)
3. "Falling Leaf Returns to Roots" (落葉歸根 Luòyèguīgēn)
4. "Preface of Composed Work" (創作前言 Chùangzùo Qíanyán)*
5. "Our Song" (我們的歌, Wǒmen de Gē)
6. "You're a Song in My Heart" (你是我心内的一首歌, Nǐ Shì Wǒ Xīnnèi de Yī Shǒugē) (featuring Selina Jen)
7. "Where's the Love" (愛在哪裡, Aì Zaì Nǎlǐ)
8. "Cockney Girl"
9. "Incomplete Melody" (不完整的旋律, Bù Wánzhěng de Xúanlǜ)
10. "Love's Praise" (愛的鼓勵, Aì de Gǔlì)
11. "Long Live Chinese People" (華人萬歲, Húarén Wànsùi)
12. "Saturday Midnight" (星期六的深夜, Xīngqīliù de Shēnyè)

(*) track not included in the Mainland version.

== Charts ==
Release	Chart	Peak position
July 13, 2007	G-music Top 20	1
