= Hear My Voice =

Studio album by Leehom Wang
- Released: June 23, 2004 (Japan)
- Genre: J-pop, R&B
- Length: N/A
- Label: Sony Music Japan

Leehom Wang chronology
Unbelievable (不可思議) (2003)	Hear My Voice (2004)	Shangri-La (心中的日月) (2004)

Hear My Voice is the second full-length Japanese album (and last, to date) of Taiwanese American R&B artist and composer, Leehom Wang (ワン・リーホン), and was released on July 28, 2004 by Sony Music Japan International Inc. The album failed to be commercially successful, peaking at No.132 on the Japanese Oricon Weekly Charts staying on the charts for just one week.

== About the album ==
This album is a compilation of Lee-Hom's past successful Mandarin songs from 1996–2003 but sung in the Japanese language. The album contains twelve songs, all of which are original songs from his Chinese albums If You Heard My Song (如果你聽見我的歌) to Unbelievable (不可思議). Most of those songs were changed significantly from their original versions and made specifically for this album. The first single "Miracle of Love" (愛の奇蹟) was promoted as an original Japanese song, although an earlier Chinese version does exist. The second single "Dream Again" was actually an English song included in White Paper (白紙) but the Japanese single has new music arrangements and a completely different chorus. Most of the original Chinese songs can be found on Lee-Hom's best 2-disc compilation Evolution (王力宏音樂進化論: 新曲+精選). The album is unique because the original Chinese songs have different musical arrangements in their Japanese counterparts in this album. Also, some of the Japanese lyrics are not direct translations of the Chinese meaning of the original songs. The album includes a picture-book with some photos of Lee-Hom and lyrics to all of the songs on the album.

== Track listing ==
1. I Can't Stop Loving (Japanese Version of "在每一秒裡都想見到你")
2. 愛の奇蹟 (Japanese Version of "愛 無所不在")
3. This Could Be Love (Japanese Version of "這就是愛")
4. Dream Again (Japanese Version)
5. ふるえる心 (Japanese Version of "不要害怕")
6. 永遠のはじまり (Japanese Version of "永遠的第一天")
7. モノローグ (Japanese Version of "你不在")
8. Hear My Voice (Japanese Version of "你和我")
9. 僕等になれなくて (Japanese Version of "兩個人不等於我們")
10. 君の知らない空へ (Japanese Version of "你可以告訴我你還愛誰")
11. 手のひらの涙 (Japanese Version of "流淚手心")
12. 君が僕の歌を聴いたら (Japanese Version of "如果你聽見我的歌")

== Singles ==
- 愛の奇蹟 (Miracle of Love) (October 1, 2003)
- Dream Again (April 27, 2004)
