= The 18 Martial Arts =

Studio album 十八般武藝 by Wang Leehom
- Released: 12 August 2010
- Genre: Mandopop, R&B, rock
- Language: Mandarin
- Label: Sony Music Taiwan
- Producer: Wang Leehom

Wang Leehom chronology
Heart Beat 心·跳 (2008)	The 18 Martial Arts (2010)	Open Fire 火力全開 (2011)

The 18 Martial Arts (Chinese: 十八般武藝; pinyin: Shíbā Bān Wǔyì) is Taiwanese American R&B singer-songwriter Wang Leehom's fourteenth Mandarin studio album. It was released on 12 August 2010 by Sony Music Taiwan.

The tracks "你不知道的事" (All The Things You Never Knew) and "柴米油鹽醬醋茶" (Firewood, Rice, Oil, Salt, Soy Sauce, Vinegar, Tea) are listed at number 6 and 33 respectively on Hit Fm Taiwan's Hit Fm Annual Top 100 Singles Chart (Hit-Fm年度百首單曲) for 2010. A track "Bo Ya Cuts The Strings" was written again by Mayday vocalist, Ashin who previously write his song "Beside the Plum Blossoms" and first time written by 831 vocalist, Up Lee.

The album was nominated for three awards at the 22nd Golden Melody Awards in 2011: Best Song of the Year for "你不知道的事" (All The Things You Never Knew), Best Mandarin Album and Best Male Mandarin Artist for Wang for his work on this album.

== Track listing ==
1. "Dragon Dance" (1:39)
2. "杜 U ♥ Me" (Do You Love Me?) (3:15)
3. "十八般武藝" (18 Martial Arts) (3:51)
4. "你不知道的事" (All The Things You Never Knew) (Love in Disguise [戀愛通告] theme) (4:39)
5. "伯牙絕弦" (Bo Ya Cuts The Strings) [Love in Disguise theme] (3:47)
6. "柴米油鹽醬醋茶" (Firewood, Rice, Oil, Salt, Soy Sauce, Vinegar, Tea) (3:51)
7. "美" (Beautiful) (3:28)
8. "需要人陪" (Need Someone By Your Side) (4:11)
9. "天涯海角" (Ends of the Earth) (4:38)
10. "你不知道的事" (All The Things You Never Knew) [Xiao Qing version] (1:07)
11. "自己人" (One Of Us) (4:26)

== Charts ==
Release	Chart	Peak position
12 August 2010	G-music Top 20	1

== Awards and nominations ==
22nd Golden Melody Awards, Taiwan – 2011
Award	Nomination	Result
Best Song of the Year	"你不知道的事" (All The Things You Never Knew)	Nominated
Best Mandarin Album	The 18 Martial Arts	Nominated
Best Male Mandarin Artist	Wang Leehom	Nominated
