= Heroes of Earth =

- Heroes of Earth cover

Studio album 蓋世英雄 by Leehom Wang
- Released: December 30, 2005
- Genre: Mandopop, R&B, hip hop
- Length: 39:13
- Language: Mandarin
- Label: Sony Music Taiwan, Homeboy Music
- Producer: Leehom Wang

Leehom Wang chronology
| Shangri-La 心中的日月 (2004) | Heroes of Earth (2005) | Change Me 改變自己 (2007) |

Heroes of Earth (simplified Chinese: 盖世英雄; traditional Chinese: 蓋世英雄; pinyin: gàishì yīngxióng) is American-Taiwanese R&B Mandopop singer-songwriter Leehom Wang's eleventh Mandarin studio album. It was released on December 30, 2005, by Sony Music Taiwan.

Since Wang's debut, this album is the most successful, shipping more than 1,000,000 copies within ten days of release. The album peaked at number one on Taiwan's G-Music Top 20 Charts for 6 weeks. and charted for 23 weeks.

== About the album ==
In this album, Wang continued to experiment with "chinked-out", the musical genre he had invented for his previous album, Shangri-La. This time he incorporated ancient Chinese Peking Opera and kunqu instead of the Chinese ethnic minority music he had used in Shangri-La.

In this album, Wang also collaborated with numerous other artists such as Chinese-American rapper Jin, Mayday vocalist Ashin, opera singer Li Yan, as well with Korean artists Rain and Lim Jeong Hee. He named the album Heroes of Earth in reference to his admiration for those he has collaborated with in this album.

== Reception ==
The track "花田錯" (Mistake in the Flower Fields) was nominated for Top 10 Gold Songs at the Hong Kong TVB8 Awards, presented by television station TVB8, in 2006.

The track, "Kiss Goodbye" won one of the Top 10 Songs of the Year and the album won Longest Number 1 Album at the 2007 HITO Radio Music Awards presented by Taiwanese radio station Hit FM.

The album was awarded one of the Top 10 Selling Mandarin Albums of the Year at the 2006 IFPI Hong Kong Album Sales Awards, presented by the Hong Kong branch of IFPI. It is the third best selling album in Taiwan with 140,000 copies sold in 2006.

== Track listing ==
1. 在梅邊 Beside the Plum Blossoms (Zai Mei Bian)
2. 花田錯 Flower Field Mistake (Hua Tian Cuo)
3. 蓋世英雄 Heroes of Earth (Gai Shi Ying Xiong) (featuring MC Jin)
4. Kiss Goodbye
5. 完美的互動 The Perfect Interaction (Wan Mei De Hu Dong) (featuring Rain and Lim Jeong-hee)
6. 大城小愛 Big City, Small Love (Da Cheng Xiao Ai)
7. 第一個清晨 The First Morning (Di Yi Ge Qing Chen)
8. 哥兒們 Homies (Ge-Er Men)
9. 讓開 Move Over (Rang Kai)
10. 愛 因為在心中 Because Love is in the Heart (Ai, Yin Wei Zai Xin Zhong)

== About the music ==
1. Beside the Plum Blossoms (在梅邊)
The background of this song is based on the story behind The Peony Pavilion, an old Chinese play written by Tang Xianzu in the Ming Dynasty Wang gave tapes of this play to Ashin of Mayday, who later wrote the lyrics. Wang also wrote the rap lyrics which can be heard at the end of the song. He rapped 295 words in 50 seconds. The song is performed with ancient kunqu music.

2. Flower Field Mistake (花田錯)
The song integrates Peking Opera and modern R&B music. It features an er-hu solo and a singing style that imitates Peking Opera, and the title is a reference to a well-known story in Peking Opera.

3. Heroes of Earth (蓋世英雄)
Not only did Wang invite the popular Chinese American rapper Jin to rap in the song, he also invited the famous Chinese opera singer Li Yan. Heavy Peking Opera and kunqu tactics are used in the song, as well as an electric guitar solo by Wang. Jin raps in both English and Cantonese in the song. This song also used in American comedy film Free Guy in 15 years later.

5. The Perfect Interaction (完美的互動)
Wang invited popular Korean singers Rain and Lim Jeong Hee (J-Lim) to be featured in the song. The song begins with a Spanish guitar solo and contains lyrics in Mandarin, Korean, and English. This was also Rain's first Chinese song. Although Rain's voice is featured in this song, he did not record it at the same time as Wang and Lim—Rain recorded first, Wang and Lim later. Sony BMG and Wang invited Rain to be featured in the music video as well, but he was unable to participate, and therefore only Wang and Lim were featured in the video.

10. Because Love is in the Heart (愛因為在心中)
This was written, composed, and produced by a Leehom Wang's fanclub in China as a gift for his 29th birthday. Wang was reportedly touched by his fans' composition and therefore added a little of his own voice in the song and included it in his album.

== World tour ==
After releasing Heroes of the Earth, Wang performed an international tour, called the Heroes of Earth World Tour (蓋世英雄 巡迴演唱會). The tour included the following concerts:

| Date | Location | Venue | Special Guests |
|---|---|---|---|
| March 11–12, 2006 | Taipei, Taiwan | Taipei Arena | Westlife, Mayday |
| April 18, 2006 | Aichi, Japan | Aichi Kousei-Nenkin Hall | |
| April 19, 2006 | Osaka, Japan | Osaka Kousei-Nenkin Hall | |
| April 21, 2006 | Tokyo, Japan | NHK Hall | |
| August 12, 2006 | Shanghai, PRC | Shanghai Stadium | Alan Ke |
| August 25–26, 2006 | Kowloon, Hong Kong SAR | Hong Kong Coliseum | Jacky Cheung, Vanness Wu |
| October 21, 2006 | Singapore | Singapore Indoor Stadium | Alan Ke |
| February 24–25, 2007 | Uncasville, Connecticut, US | Mohegan Sun Arena | |
| March 4, 2007 | Kuala Lumpur, Malaysia | Bukit Jalil National Stadium | JJ Lin |
| October 6, 2007 | Nanjing, China | Wutaishan Sports Center | Elva Hsiao |
| December 22, 2007 | Las Vegas, Nevada | MGM Grand Garden Arena | |
| December 23, 2007 | San Francisco, California | Bill Graham Civic Auditorium | |
| January 11, 2008 | Jakarta, Indonesia | Sands Mangga Dua Square | Idol Divo |

== Charts ==
| Release | Chart | Peak position |
|---|---|---|
| December 30, 2005 | G-music Top 20 | 1 |

=== Singles ===
| Song | Chart | Peak position |
|---|---|---|
| Mistake in the Flower Fields | Hito Chinese Charts | 1 |
| Kiss Goodbye | Hito Chinese Charts | 1 |
| The Perfect Interaction | Hito Chinese Charts | 1 |
| Big City, Small Love | Hito Chinese Charts | 1 |
| Heroes of Earth | Hito Chinese Charts | 4 |
| Beside the Plum Blossoms | Hito Chinese Charts | 3 |
| The First Morning | Hito Chinese Charts | 2 |
