= Shangri-La (Wang Leehom album) =

- Shangri-La cover

Studio album 心中的日月 by Leehom Wang
- Released: 31 December 2004
- Genre: Mandopop, R&B, hip hop
- Length: 39:23
- Language: Mandarin
- Label: Sony Music Taiwan
- Producer: Leehom Wang

Leehom Wang chronology
Hear My Voice (2004)	Shangri-La (2004)	Heroes of Earth 蓋世英雄 (2005)

Shangri-La (Chinese: 心中的日月; pinyin: xīnzhōng de rìyuè) is an album by Taiwanese-American R&B artist, Leehom Wang. It was released on 31 December 2004 by Sony Music Taiwan. In this album, Wang incorporated the often unheard music of the Chinese ethnic minorities and therefore began the first chapter of "chinked-out", a term he coined together to represent the ties between Chinese and Western music. He experimented with the tribal sounds of Taiwan, Tibet, and Mongolia, traveling the area carrying 15 kg of equipment while fighting bouts of altitude and food sickness.

== Album ==
In this album, Lee-Hom began the first chapter of "chinked-out," a term he coined together to represent the connection with both Chinese and Western music. He incorporated the often unheard Chinese ethnic minority music, which includes Mongolian, Taiwanese, Tibetan, etc. into modern hip-hop melodies. For the production of this album he traveled all around China with heavy equipment to collect these rare pieces of music.

His reasons behind the title of this album is also well thought of. Shangri-La is another meaning for a mythical paradise. Translated in Chinese, Shangri-La means 心中的日月, which is literally translated as the heart's sun and moon. When Lee-Hom arrived to the district of Shangri-La, he was immediately absorbed into the astonishing and unique music he had heard and therefore named his album, Shangri-La, or, Xin Zhong De Ri Yue. The music video for title track "心中的日月" (The Heart's Sun and Moon) features Taiwanese actress Ann Hsu.

== Reception ==
The tracks "心中的日月" (The Heart's Sun and Moon/Shangri-La), "Forever Love" and "放開你的心" (Release Your Heart) were nominated for Top 10 Gold Songs at the Hong Kong TVB8 Awards, presented by television station TVB8, in 2005.

The album was awarded one of the Top 10 Selling Mandarin Albums of the Year at the 2005 IFPI Hong Kong Album Sales Awards, presented by the Hong Kong branch of IFPI.

== Track listing ==
1. "開場" (Intro)
2. "放開你的心" Fang Kai Ni De Xin (Release Your Heart)
3. "心中的日月" Xin Zhong De Ri Yue (The Heart's Sun and Moon/Shangri-La)
4. "竹林深處" Zhu Lin Shen Chu (In the Depths of the Bamboo Forest)
5. "Forever Love"
6. "在那遙遠的地方" Zai Na Yao Yuan De Di Fang (At That Faraway Place)
7. "一首簡單的歌" Yi Shou Jian Dan De Ge (A Simple Song)
8. "星座" Xing Zuo (Astrology)
9. "過來" Guo Lai (Come Here)
10. "愛錯" Ai Cuo (Loved Wrongly)
11. "Follow Me"

== Charts ==
Release	Chart	Peak position	Chart run
December 31, 2004	G-music Top 20	1	N/A

=== Singles ===
Song	Chart	Peak position	Chart run
The Heart's Sun and Moon	Hito Chinese Charts	1	2 weeks
Forever Love	Hito Chinese Charts	1	1 week
Release Your Heart	Hito Chinese Charts	1	1 week
A Simple Song	Hito Chinese Charts	3	2 weeks
Astrology	Hito Chinese Charts	1	1 week
Within the Bamboo Grove	Hito Chinese Charts	2	2 weeks
Wrong Love	Hito Chinese Charts	1	4 weeks
