= Impossible to Miss You =

Impossible to Miss You 不可能錯過你

Studio album by Wang Leehom
- Released: June 9, 1999
- Genre: C-pop, R&B, hip hop
- Label: Sony Music
- Producer: Wang Leehom

Wang Leehom chronology
Revolution (1998)	Impossible to Miss You 不可能錯過你 (1999)	Forever's First Day (永遠的第一天) (2000)

Impossible to Miss You (simplified Chinese: 不可能错过你; traditional Chinese: 不可能錯過你; pinyin: bù kě néng cuò guò nǐ) is the 6th album by Taiwanese R&B artist and composer, Wang Leehom, and was released on 9 June 1999.

== Track listing ==
1. 釣靈感
2. 不可能錯過你
3. 流淚手心
4. Julia
5. 感情副作用
6. 打開愛
7. 不降落的滑翔翼
8. 你愛過沒有
9. 失去了你
10. Happy Ending
11. Mary Says

== Sources ==
All Music Biography of Wang Leehom
