= Heart Beat (Wang Leehom album) =

Heart · Beat (心 · 跳)

Studio album by Leehom Wang
- Released: December 26, 2008
- Genre: Mandopop, R&B, pop rock
- Label: Sony BMG
- Producer: Leehom Wang

Leehom Wang chronology
Change Me (改變自己) (2007)	Heart · Beat (心 · 跳) (2008)	The 18 Martial Arts (十八般武藝) (2010)

Heart Beat (Chinese: 心·跳; pinyin: xīn tìao) is the 13th album of the American Taiwanese R&B artist and composer Leehom Wang. The album was released on 26 December 2008. According to Taiwan's G-Music chart the album is the sixth best selling album in Taiwan in 2009.

== About the album ==
Leehom debuted the first song "What's Up Rock!!" (搖滾怎麼了!!) on radio in September 2008. This song shows a fusion of his "chinked-out" style with the genre of rock involved as well. He collaborated with Janet Hsieh playing the Pipa, merging traditional Chinese sounds with that of modern electric guitar to unveil rock with an Eastern touch.

With the release of the song, Leehom announced his MUSIC-MAN World Tour, which kicked off at Taipei Arena as a prelude to his album . In his concert, he debuted three new songs: "Dirty Love" (愛得得體), "No Reason to Pay Attention to You" (我完全沒有任何理由理你) and "Everything". However, the title track of the album, "Heartbeat" (心跳) was not introduced until December 8, when the song was released on the radio.

== Track listing ==
1. 愛得 得體 Dirty Love (3:48)
2. 心跳 Heartbeat (4:23)
3. 春雨裡洗過的太陽 The Sun After Washed by Spring Rain (4:51)
4. Everything (4:59)
5. 我完全沒有任何理由理你 No Reason to Pay Attention to You (3:07)
6. 另一個天堂 Another Heaven (4:26) (featuring Jane Zhang)
7. 玩偶 Puppet (2:57)
8. 腳本 Screenplay (4:12)
9. 競爭對手 Competitor (4:05)
10. 搖滾怎麼了!!What's Wrong With Rock!! (2:35)

== Charts ==
Chart (2008)	Peak position
G-music Top 20	1
