= Unbelievable (Wang Leehom album) =

- Unbelievable cover

Studio album by Leehom Wang
- Released: October 15, 2003
- Genres: Mandopop, R&B, hip hop
- Language: Mandarin
- Label: Sony Music Taiwan
- Producer: Leehom Wang

Leehom Wang chronology
'The Only One' (2003)	Unbelievable (2003)	Hear My Voice (2004)

Unbelievable (simplified Chinese: 不可思议; traditional Chinese: 不可思議; pinyin: búkěsīyì) is the 9th album of the Taiwanese R&B artist and composer, Leehom Wang, and was released on 15 October 2003.

The album was awarded one of the Top 10 Selling Mandarin Albums of the Year at the 2004 IFPI Hong Kong Album Sales Awards, presented by the Hong Kong branch of IFPI.

== About the album ==
After the success of Leehom Wang's last Mandarin album, The One and Only, Wang decided to head toward a different road of music. Although keeping his usual R&B grove, Wang decided to move away from his previous rock image and focus on hip-hop. Wang's new style was quickly accepted by his fans and gained much more new fans. Copies of the album sold past 1,300,000 in Asia, defeating his last successful album, The One and Only by quite a feat.

Wang's first world tour was also called, Unbelievable. However the tour began one year before the release of this album. During the world tours, Wang had hinted that he was approaching to a new style of music in his new album by incorporating hip-hop beats in some of his rock songs.

Under this album, Wang won Best Producer of the Year at the 15th Golden Melody Awards in 2004. This was the second time he was granted the honor, the first being at the 10th Golden Melody Awards in 1999, under his 1998 breakthrough album, Revolution (公轉自轉).

== Track listing ==
1. Ya Birthday
2. 你不在 You're Not Here (Ni Bu Zai)
3. Love Love Love
4. 女朋友 Girlfriend (Nu Peng You)
5. 此刻，你心裡想起誰 Who Are You Thinking Of At This Moment (Ci Ke, Ni Xin Li Xiang Qi Shei)
6. 不可思議電臺 Unbelievable Radio (Bu Ke Si Yi Dian Tai)
7. 你和我 You And Me (Ni He Wo)
8. What Was I Thinking?
9. Not Your Average Thug
10. 不著地 Mile High (Bu Zhao Di)
11. Can You Feel My World
12. 愛無所不在 Love Is Everywhere (Ai Wu Suo Bu Zai)
13. 我就喜歡 I'm Lovin' It (Wo Jiu Xi Huan)
