= Wang Leehom =

American singer, songwriter, actor

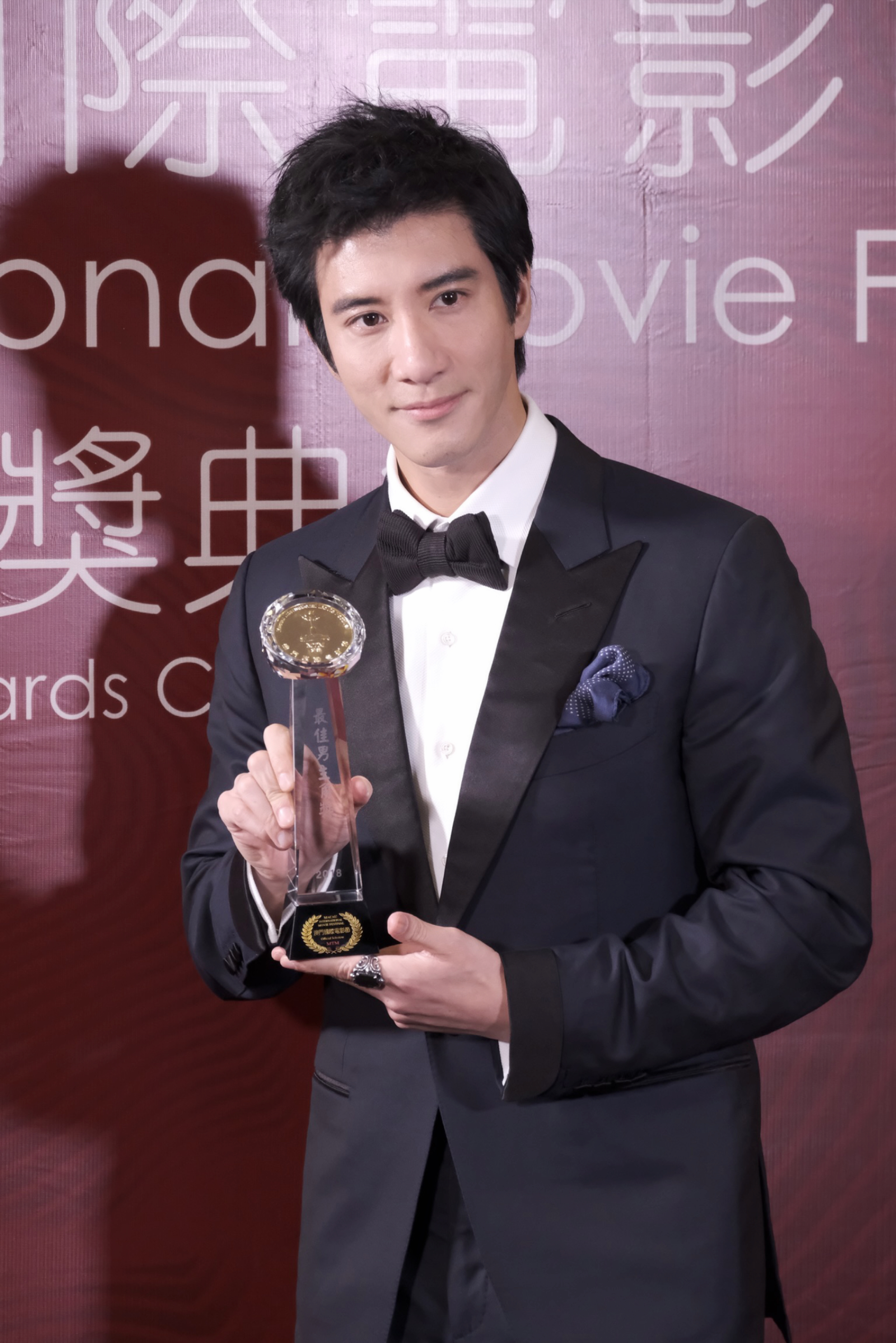
- Wang at the 2018 Golden Lotus Awards
- Born: Alexander Leehom Wang; May 17, 1976 (age 50); Rochester, New York, U.S.
- Education: Williams College (BA); Berklee College of Music
- Occupations: Singer-songwriter; actor; producer; film director; musician; music arranger; composer
- Years active: 1995–present
- Spouse: Lee Jinglei (m. 2013; div. 2021)
- Children: 3
- Musical career
- Origin: Taiwan; United States
- Genres: Pop; R&B; hip hop; rock; Broadway
- Instruments: Violin; piano; drums; guitar; bass/electric guitar; erhu; vibraphone; harmonica; chinese flutes; guzheng; zhongruan, etc.
- Labels: Universal; Asia Muse; Sony; Decca; BMG

Chinese name
- Chinese: 王力宏
Transcriptions
Standard Mandarin
- Hanyu Pinyin: Wáng Lìhóng
Yue: Cantonese
- Jyutping: Wong4 Lik6 Wang4
Southern Min
- Hokkien POJ: Ông Le̍k-hông
- Website: wangleehom.com

Wang Leehom (Chinese: 王力宏; pinyin: Wáng Lìhóng; Pe̍h-ōe-jī: Ông Le̍k-hông; born May 17, 1976), sometimes credited as Leehom Wang, is an American singer-songwriter, actor, producer, and film director. His music is known for fusing hip-hop and R&B, with traditional Chinese music.

Wang was born to a Taiwanese American family and graduated from Williams College. Since his 1995 debut, Wang has released 25 albums, that have sold over 60 million copies. He is a four-time winner and 19-time nominee of the Golden Melody Awards. His sold-out concert at the Beijing National Stadium on April 14, 2012, was the first solo pop concert to be held at the venue. With over 72 million followers on social media, Wang is one of the most followed celebrities in China. In 2018, CNN dubbed him "King of Chinese Pop" and the Los Angeles Times called him "the biggest American star America has never heard of." Wang was listed as one of Goldsea's 100 Most Inspiring Asian Americans of All Time.

Wang holds honorary doctoral degrees from both Williams College and Berklee College of Music. In addition to his music, Wang has also acted in over twenty films, including Ang Lee's Lust, Caution, Jackie Chan's Little Big Soldier and Michael Mann's Blackhat. He won Best Actor at the 2018 Macau Film Festival. Asia Society presented the 2019 Game Changer Award to Wang Leehom at the U.S.-Asia Entertainment Summit.

Wang is an environmental activist, and his album Change Me was dedicated to raising eco-awareness among Chinese youth. Wang was one of the first torchbearers for the Beijing 2008 Summer Olympics, and performed in the Olympics' closing ceremony in Beijing. He was again a torchbearer for the 2012 Summer Olympics in London, making him the only person in the Mandarin pop circle to have taken part in the event twice. He is a longtime ambassador for World Vision Taiwan and Malaysia.

== Life and music career ==
=== Childhood and early beginnings ===
Wang was born in Rochester, New York, to a Taiwanese American family. He is the second of three sons of immigrants from Taiwan. His father, Ta-chung, was a pediatrician and elder cousin of Lee Chien-fu, the original singer of Descendants of the Dragon, and his mother, Lee Ming-shu, moved to the United States to further their college studies in the early 1970s. Influenced by his older brother, Leete, who had been taking violin lessons since he was seven, Wang began to develop a curious interest towards the violin and its musical counterparts when he was three. He begged his mother to put him in violin lessons with his brother, but his mother was against it, reasoning that he was too young. When Wang turned six, his mother enrolled him in violin classes, performing along with his brother. As he became a teenager, he began taking piano lessons, also teaching himself the guitar. He also worked several jobs to earn money to buy a secondhand drum kit.

He attended Jefferson Road Elementary School, Pittsford Middle School, and Pittsford Sutherland High School in Pittsford, New York. He graduated from Pittsford Sutherland. Passionate for a career in music, he chose to attend Williams College double majoring in music and Asian studies. He joined an all-male a cappella group, The Springstreeters, and the group recorded several demo tracks.

In the summer of 1995, while Wang was visiting his grandparents in Taiwan, he was offered a professional recording contract by Bertelsmann Music Group (BMG) after he participated in a talent competition hosted by the label. Not wanting to lose the opportunity, he immediately began preparing for his debut and released his debut album Love Rival, Beethoven (情敌贝多芬) that December. The record received little limelight, forcing him to leave the label. He signed with Decca Records the following year, a label then famous for producing "powerful singers" (實力派歌手) in Taiwan. Wanting to also have control in the idol market, the label initially planned to market Wang as the mainstream "romantic idol", like with their previous artist Mavis Fan. However, after discovering Wang's talent in music-making, Decca began promoting him as Taiwan's "quality idol" (優質偶像) instead. Wang released his second album, If You Heard My Song in 1996, which included some of his own compositions. He co-wrote the album's eponymous title song, which earned positive responses from the audience. The album drew moderately successful sales, and he became a rising star in the idol market, also finding similar successes with his third and fourth albums. During this time, Wang was asked to leave his college studies to pursue a full-time singing career, but he insisted on finishing school first.

=== 1998–2000: Rise to prominence ===
Wang's contract with Decca Records was terminated after the release of his fourth album White Paper in the summer of 1997. After graduating with honors at Williams College, he released his first award-winning album, Revolution, under Sony Music Entertainment in August 1998. The album became his breakthrough album, immediately selling over 10,000 domestic units in the first week of release. Critics rated the album highly, and it won Wang two Golden Melody Awards—Best Producer and Best Mandarin Male Singer. He was the youngest artist to win in either of the two categories. Wang has been nominated the Best Mandarin Male Singer at the awards every year since the success of Revolution. The singles of Revolution also achieved similar success–"Revolution" became Wang Leehom's first No. 1 single, becoming one of the top 20 songs of the year on Channel V Taiwan.

He continued his studies by attending Berklee College of Music's Professional Music program, with voice as his principal instrument. In 1999, Wang released his sixth album, Impossible to Miss You, which combined the catchy pop melodies of Revolution with a quirky style of new-found dance-pop. It became his then best-selling album, selling over 1 million copies. All of the album's promotional singles topped KTV charts and yearly music charts, including the upbeat "Julia" and the ballad "Crying Palm". His album also attracted international attention–Wang won three Best Male Vocalist awards at three different award ceremonies and was also awarded for his musical merit in the album at the 1st annual Asia Chinese Music Awards.

At the beginning of the millennium, Wang began filming for several Cantonese-language Hong Kong blockbusters, which inspired him to study the Cantonese language. He included a Cantonese track, "Love My Song", in the Hong Kong release of Forever's First Day (2000), his seventh album. Unlike his previous two albums, Forever's First Day consisted mainly of melodic R&B tunes. The album's eponymous single is a tragic romantic ballad, speaking of a separation of two individuals. Although raised in New York for most of his life, living in Taiwan made Wang realize the deep roots of his Chinese heritage. Forever's First Day yielded a cover of his uncle's signature song "Descendants of the Dragon"; Wang re-arranged the song with heavier rock and dance elements. The song also included a rap bridge that summarized experiences of his parents living as Chinese Americans in New York.

=== 2001–2003: International success ===
Wang's next album, The One and Only (2001), received phenomenal international success. Selling over 1 million units in Asia, the rock-inspired album won him over seven different prestigious awards throughout 2001 and 2002. The album's title single "The One and Only" peaked No. 1 in almost all available music charts of Taiwan and was on the Ringback Tone No. 1 Download Charts for over a year, becoming his signature song. The One and Only also found success in Japan, opting him to release his first full-length Japanese album The Only One on May 9, 2003. The album only promoted one single, a Japanese version of "The One and Only", but it did not meet success on Japan's Oricon Charts. Wang also began filming several Japanese films, establishing his rising star status in Japan.

Eager to experience and perform different musical genres, Wang embarked on his first Asia-wide concert tour, The Unbelievable Tour a few months before the release of his ninth album, Unbelievable (2003). His concert tour received great reviews from both fans and music critics; they were impressed and shocked with his newfoundhip-hip hop image. His R&B/hip hop-inspired album Unbelievable involved new urban pop numbers, drawing hip hop influences from different styles of popular music, such as Indipop and urban pop. The album marked a milestone in his musical career; his new image received international critical acclaim, and the album a chart-topping success, selling over 1.5 million units by 2004. A celebratory version of the album was released three months later, also becoming a chart-topping album. The album's ballad "You're Not Here" also experienced international success, ranking No. 1 on several music charts for over 10 weeks. Unbelievable yielded his second win for Best Producer of the Year at the Golden Melody Awards in 2004.

=== 2004–2006: Career advancements ===
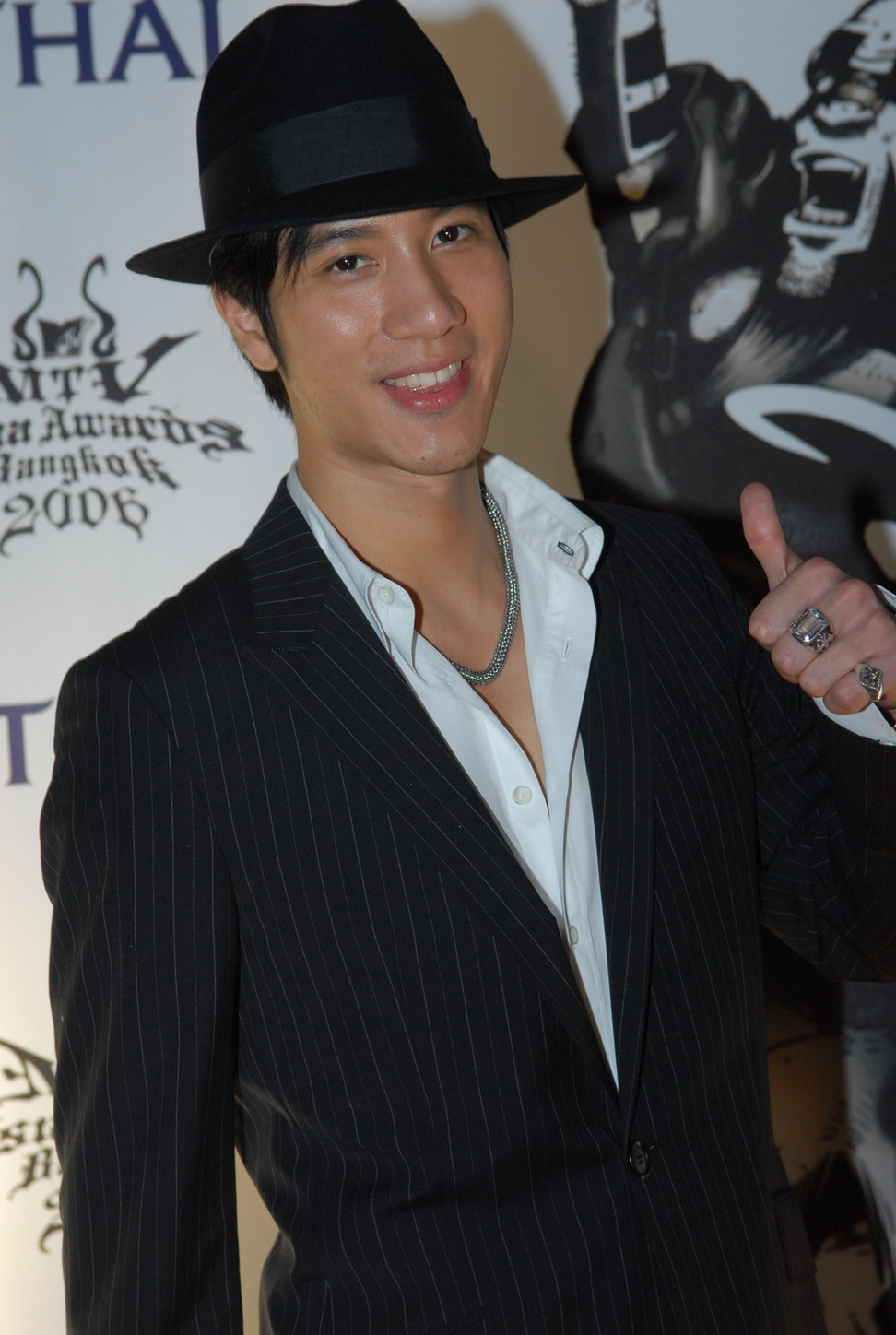
Wang at the MTV Asia Awards 2006

Since 2004, Wang has become known for his brand of China Wind music, known as "chinked-out". Having established himself as one of the most important, influential, and prolific artists in Chinese music, Wang continued to invent and experiment with new sounds and voices. For most of 2004, he traveled to remote villages in China, collecting often unheard tribal sounds of aboriginal Chinese music, Tibetan music, and Mongolian music. With his younger brother Leekai as his assistant, they carried 15 kg of music equipment as he recorded these sounds, recording and producing his album on the way. He incorporated these sounds into R&B and hip hop music, coining the style as "chinked-out". Despite the derogatory nature of the term "chink", Wang had wanted to repossess the term and "make it cool." Shangri-La was released on the last day of 2004, selling 40,000 copies within the first ten days of release. Shangri-La became an international music sensation, especially catching the attention of many youths in Asia. Within a month, the album sold over 300,000 copies, ultimately selling over 1.5 million units.

Wang continued to infuse chinked-out elements into his next album Heroes of Earth (2005). Unlike the aboriginal tribal music heard in Shangri-La, Heroes of Earth contained mixes of Beijing opera and Kunqu. Following the concept of "heroes", he collaborated with Ashin of Mayday ("Beside the Plum Blossoms"), Chinese American rapper Jin and opera master Li Yan ("Heroes of Earth"), and also K-pop artists Rain and Lim Jeong-hee ("Perfect Interaction"). Heroes of Earth was the fastest-selling album of both 2005 and 2006, selling over 1 million copies ten days after its release. Subsequently, the album stayed as No. 1 in the charts for six weeks, and remained in the charts for 23 weeks, ultimately becoming 2006's third best-selling album. By 2007, about 3 million units were sold, and has since been Wang's most commercially and critically successful album. The album earned Wang a Golden Melody Award for Best Mandarin Male Singer for the second time.

Three months after the release of Heroes of Earth, he began the Heroes of Earth Tour, his first major world tour. The concert commenced with two shows per night in the Taipei Dome in March 2006, breaking Taiwan's concert attendance records.

=== 2007–present: Professional breakthrough ===
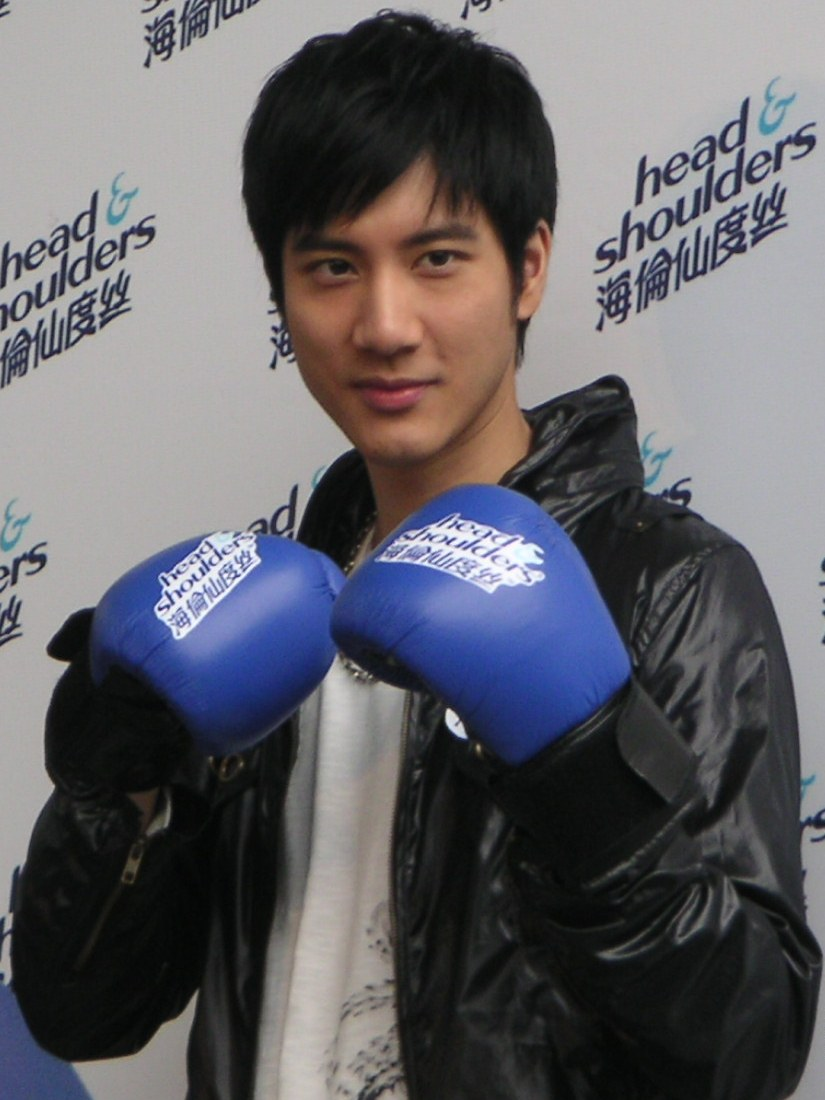
Wang in 2007

Wang took a break in working on his music to film Lust, Caution (2007), an espionage thriller film directed by Ang Lee. He released a promotional single, "Falling Leaves Return to Roots" on June 20, 2007, through Hito Radio, a month before the release of his twelfth studio album, Change Me. "Falling Leaves Return to Roots" incorporated Broadway-influenced musical elements, with classical instrumental accompaniments, such as the violin and piano. When asked about the sudden change of music style, Wang explained that the inspiration behind the song was due to the influence of his portrayal of Kuang Yumin in Lust, Caution. "In the past, I have only been releasing mainstream pop and chinked-out related hip hop. Lust, Caution made me return to 1930's Shanghai, re-living the moment."

Change Me was released on Friday, July 13, despite the superstition generally attached to Friday the 13th. Unlike his previous albums, Change Me mainly concentrates on pop rock, including influences of Broadway ("Falling Leaves Return to Roots") and old-school Taiwanese pop ("You Are a Song in My Heart"). Through this album, he promoted the issue of global warming and raised environmental awareness. The packaging of the album used only recycled paper and contained no plastic. He believed that small changes by each person can change the world. "To change the world, you start with changing yourself." Reviews of the album were generally positive, defining the album as "mature". An online album poll organized by China's Sohu, however, suggested that Wang's album did not meet expectations. Netizens remarked that his chinked-out productions were more impressive, although that genre itself has also been criticized. Nonetheless, over 1 million units were shipped on the first day of release. The album broke past 2 million sales, becoming one of Wang's best-selling albums.

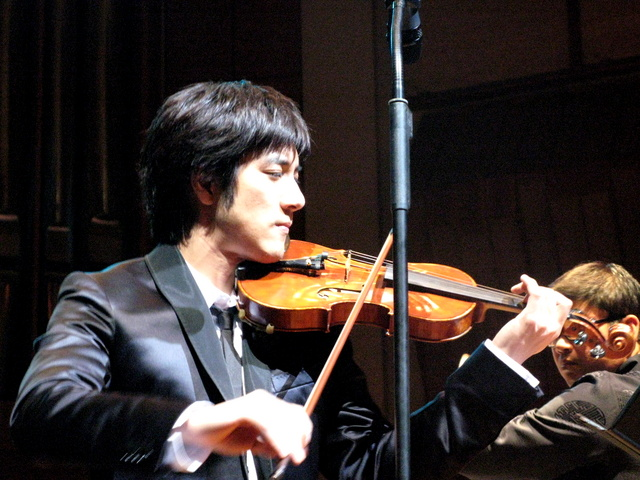
Wang in 2008

In August 2008, Wang sought US$320,000 in damages for plagiarism by Pritam, an Indian composer. The lead song for the movie Race (2008), composed by Pritam, was allegedly copied from "In the Depths of the Bamboo Forest", a single taken off from Wang Leehom's Shangri-La album. In November 2008, Wang was selected to conduct the Hong Kong Philharmonic Orchestra for their 2008 annual grand finale, being the first Asian pop musician to conduct the orchestra. The concert Hong Kong Music, Leehom Wang (港樂‧王力宏) was held in the Hong Kong Cultural Centre for three nights, with four shows, receiving CNN International coverage throughout.

Wang embarked on his second world tour, the MUSIC-MAN Tour, in the latter months of 2008. The tour commenced with two shows per night in the Taipei Dome in September 2008, three months before the release of Wang's thirteenth studio album, Heart Beat. Heart Beat was released on December 26, debuting at No. 3 on the weekly G-Music charts. The album peaked at No. 1 on its seventh week of release, ultimately staying on the charts for 17 weeks. Like Wang's previous album, Heart Beat showed a similar emphasis of rock influences. The album largely focused on guitar and electric guitar solos, which Wang also used for performances in most of the album's music videos. Wanting to continue a similar "chinked-out" element, the album's first single, "What's Up with Rock?!" incorporated rock influences with Chinese flavor. For the track, he worked with pipa artist Liu Fang, and the two concentrated on mixing both electric guitar elements and pipa strings into the song.

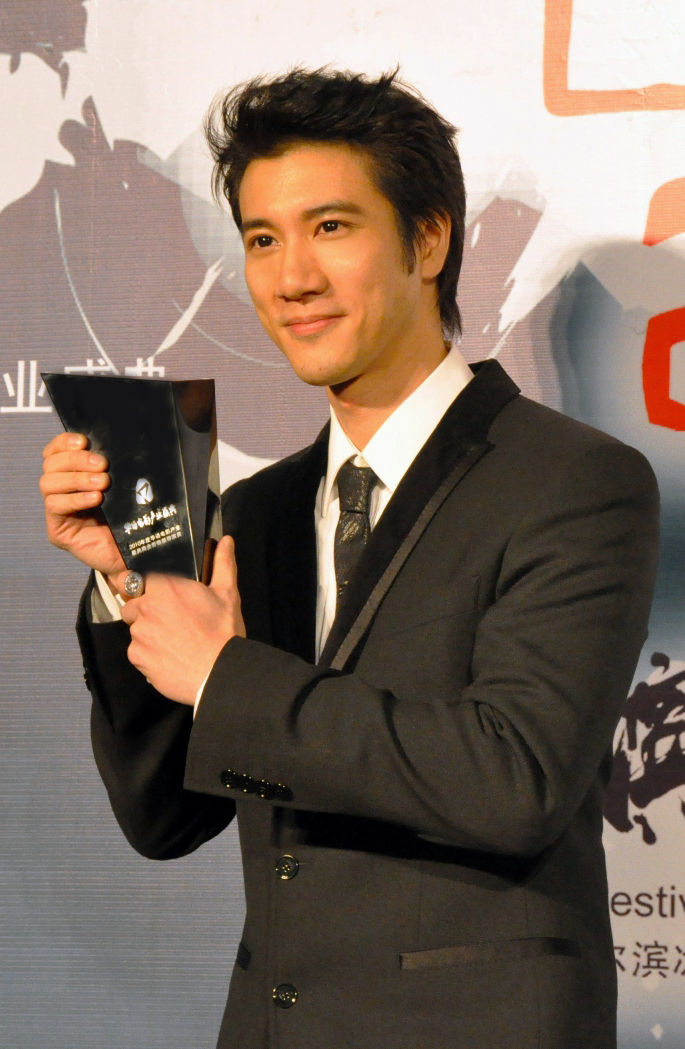
Wang at the 2011 Harbin Film Festival

On April 15, 2011, Wang Leehom took home the Best Male Singer (Hong Kong and Taiwan region), Best Album for The 18 Martial Arts, and Best Newcomer Director Award for his directorial debut, Love in Disguise at the Global Chinese Music Awards. On September 7, 2011, it was announced that Wang hired Wong Fu Productions to direct his upcoming music video. His concert at the Beijing National Stadium on April 14, 2012, attracted up to 90,000 people. On November 30, 2012, Wang received the 2012 MAMA (Mnet Asian Music Awards) for "Best Asian Artist". On December 2, 2012, Wang Leehom surpassed actress Yao Chen to become the Chinese with most Weibo (the most popular micro-blog in China) fans.

On April 21, 2013, Wang became the first Chinese singer invited to speak at Oxford Union at the University of Oxford. On February 27, 2017, Madame Toussauds revealed Wang's wax statue in their Beijing museum.

== Musical style ==
Wang's music varies in style greatly from album to album. Although he is classified as an R&B artist, Wang Leehom demonstrates competence with many styles of music ranging from traditional Mandopop, Broadway, jazz, rock, R&B, gospel, acoustic, Indipop, hip-hop, to rap. Many of the styles are infused with a Chinese flavor.

When he debuted, he sang old school pop and acoustic R&B ballads. Starting from Revolution (公轉自轉), Wang began to test out R&B pop music, but quickly jumped to a quirky style of dance-pop for Impossible to Miss You (不可能錯過你). Starting from Forever's First Day (永遠的第一天), he began composing rock songs with heavy electric guitar melodies and less emphasis on dance-pop. Nonetheless, he still concentrated in light R&B music. The One and Only (唯一) became his only fully produced rock album.

Unbelievable began a new road of music for Wang. Aside from the usual R&B groove, he contributed hip hop and rap that was not clearly emphasized in his past albums. "Not Your Average Thug" was a newly composed R&B style with a huge amount of American influence. "Can You Feel My World" was a different style of R&B, and the song contained great uses of the piano and violin as the accompaniment. Fast dance songs like "Ya Birthday" and "Girlfriend" (Chinese: 女朋友; pinyin: nǚ péngyǒu) incorporated rapid rap and heavy drum rhythms. "Girlfriend" included a heavily emphasised chinese flute and a music style that is influenced by Indipop.

Then, I coined the term chinked-out. Derived from the historically derogatory racial slur chink, used to put-down Chinese people, chinked-out reclaims the word, turns its negative connotations upside-down, and uses them as material to fuel the new sound of this music. The term describes an effort to create a sound that is international, and at the same time, Chinese. In this album, I decided to implement some of China's most precious and untapped resources, the musics of its shaoshu minzu [少數民族], or ethnic minorities, concentrating on the regions of Yunnan, Shangri-La, Tibet, Xinjiang, and Mongolia. This is not one of those world music CDs. It's an R&B/hip hop album that creates a new vibe the whole world can identify as being Chinese.

— Wang Leehom on Shangri-La

"Beside the Plum Blossoms" (在梅邊)
From Heroes of Earth (2005). The song utilizes a fusion of traditional kunqu melodies with modern hip hop rhythm, one of the several types of the chinked-out music style.

Heroes of Earth displayed a different side to chink out. Instead of ethnic minority music, Wang focused on Beijing opera and Kunqu. He used instruments such as the erhu, guqin, and guzheng to infuse his new album with another side of traditional Chinese sound. "Beside the Plum Blossoms" (Chinese: 在梅邊; pinyin: zài méi biān) dealt with fast kunqu melodies. In the last 50 seconds of the song, Wang rapped over 250 words, increasing in speed towards the middle and then slowed down. This was to emphasize the accelerating and descending beats of traditional Chinese opera.

In addition to his chinked-out style of music, he is also noted for writing modern love ballads like "Forever Love", "Kiss Goodbye", "The One and Only" and most recently, "All the Things You Never Knew" (你不知道的事) which are sung with piano and string instrument accompaniments.

Wang collaborated with Swedish EDM DJ Avicii for his 2014 single Lose Myself, which was the theme for the Storm Music Festival, China's biggest electronic music festival, held on October 5 and 6, 2014 in Shanghai. The song is also the first single to be released from his 2015 album, Your Love.

== Acting career ==
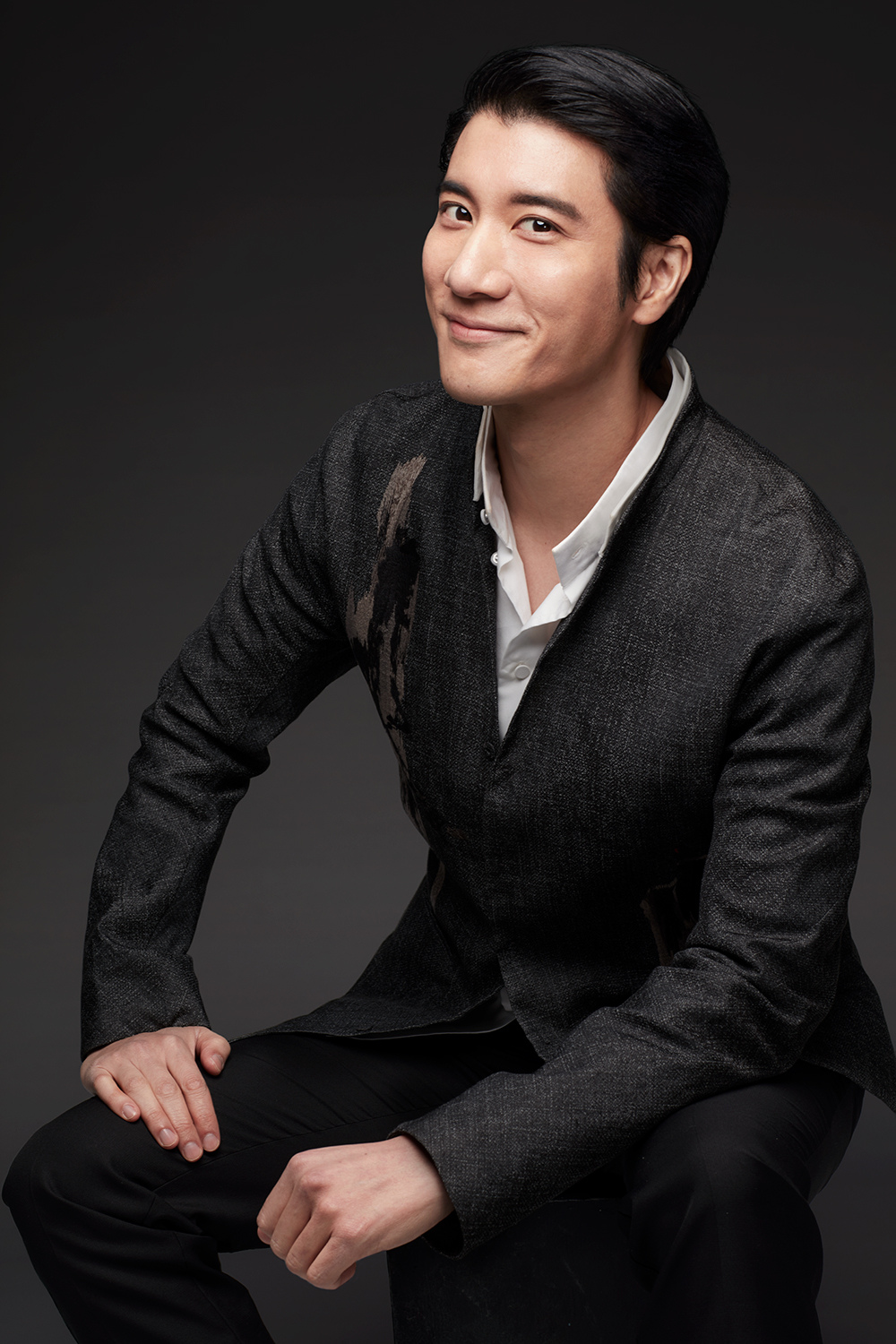
Wang in 2016

Wang had displayed interest in acting when he starred in several musical plays when he was in high school and college. In 2000, he made his feature film debut in the Hong Kong action crime thriller, China Strike Force, starring alongside Aaron Kwok, Norika Fujiwara, and Ruby Lin. Hong Kong critics had remarked Wang for giving a well-toned performance as his first film. His next starring role was the 2001 Hong Kong science fiction film The Avenging Fist as the main character Nova. He then starred in two Japanese films: Moon Child (2003) and Starlit High Noon (2005).

The major breakthrough in his film career was in Lust, Caution, directed and produced by Academy Award-winner Ang Lee. The film is based on a novella written by Eileen Chang and revolves around a plot to assassinate a high-ranking Chinese official in the Wang Jingwei Government using a beautiful young woman as bait. Wang plays Kuang Yumin, a patriotic college student who persuades Wong Chia-chi (Tang Wei) to seduce Mr. Yee (Tony Leung). The film was released in the US cinemas on September 28, 2007. Lust, Caution was produced on a budget of approximately $15 million and grossed $64,574,876 worldwide.

In 2009, Wang was selected to star with Jackie Chan in Little Big Soldier. In 2010, Wang stepped behind the camera to direct and star in, Love in Disguise (Chinese: 戀愛通告; pinyin: Liàn ài tōng gào), also starring Liu Yifei and Joan Chen. Love in Disguise went on to become the highest-grossing film for a first-time director in Chinese history grossing over 60,000,000 RMB domestically.

In July 2013, Wang was announced to be starring in an adaptation of Stan Lee's Annihilator. The film is a co-production between Magic Storm Entertainment, who partners with Stan Lee's POW! Entertainment banner and the Chinese state-run National Film Capital. Wang co-starred with Chris Hemsworth and Tang Wei in Blackhat (2015), an action thriller film on cybercrime which was written, directed and produced by Michael Mann. Wang's performance in Forever Young (2018) won Best Actor at the 2018 Golden Lotus Awards.

== Endorsements ==
Wang is one of the most highly visible celebrities in Asia due in no small part to his many product endorsements including: Coca-Cola, McDonald's, Sony Ericsson, Bausch & Lomb, Bosideng MAN, Garnier, Lay's Chips, Nikon, Brand's, Hyundai, and also Wahaha purified drinking water, which he has endorsed since 1999.

Wang's Bausch & Lomb print advertisements and TV commercials featured prominently in the popular 2008–2010 TV series Chou Nu Wu Di. The series, which took place at an advertising agency, was an adaptation of the 1999 Colombian telenovela Yo soy Betty, la fea.

In December 2021, in the aftermath of infidelity scandals, several brands including Infiniti and Chow Tai Seng, terminated their endorsement deals with Wang. Infiniti had just signed an endorsement deal with Wang 2 days earlier. On January 2, 2024, after two years of investigation into his ex-wife's accusations against Wang, Beijing courts unfroze Wang's company assets, and stated that no evidence was found to support those allegations, and that it was possible that Wang was the victim of a fabricated defamatory smear campaign.

== Charitable events and free shows ==
Wang is also recognized for his effort and financial contributions to charity. He is active with Worldvision and has visited Laos and Sierra Leone in the last couple of years to raise awareness about the state of poverty in those countries. He personally sponsors over 20 underprivileged children throughout the world with NGO World Vision and frequently participates in the much needed fund-raising campaigns for disaster relief, such as the massive earthquake in Sichuan (2008) and Typhoon Morakot in Taiwan (2009). In 2003, he and David Tao composed a song titled Hand in Hand (sung by over 80 celebrities in Taiwan) to promote support and courage to those affected by SARS.

In 2012, on World Vision Malaysia's 15th Anniversary, Wang was named as the 30-Hour Famine Ambassador. In 2019, he is once again named Ambassador Of World Vision Malaysia. Since 2012, Wang has been starting almost every year by holding a free show for his fans. The shows are usually held in an intimate setting with him and a small band in different cities every year, and tickets are given away free-of-charge on a first-come-first-served basis. In 2020, Wang joined the "Stand Against Racism in the Time of COVID" forum held by the Asia Society, alongside guests such as Los Angeles Mayor Eric Garcetti and Representative Ted Lieu.

== Participation in 2008 Beijing Olympic Games ==
Wang was chosen as one of the torchbearers to run in Greece. He was torchbearer number 17 on March 24, the first day of the torch relay. He also attended the torch lighting ceremony before his run. Wang took the torch from Liu Hongliang, son of the first Chinese to attend the Olympic Games, Liu Changchun. He represented the newest generation of singers from Taiwan and China. He was chosen mainly because he is devoted to helping save the environment, as shown in his latest album Change Me.

Another reason he was chosen is due to Wang's enthusiasm in the 2008 Olympic Games Theme Songs Competition. His single "One World One Dream" was chosen as an Olympic Games participation song. The single was written, sung, produced, and scored entirely by himself. He sang along with Jackie Chan, Stephanie Sun, and Han Hong in the song for "The One Man Olympics" which was about the first Chinese to be in the Olympics. He also sang in the 100 days countdown theme song "Beijing Welcomes You". He also sang alongside Stefanie Sun, Wang Feng, and Jane Zhang in the Beijing 2008 Olympic Games Torch Relay theme song "Light the Passion, Share the Dream". He is also one of the candidates to vote for the performer of the Beijing 2008 Olympic Games theme song. In the closing ceremony, he sang "Beijing Beijing, I Love Beijing" alongside Hong Kong singer Kelly Chen and Korean singer Rain.

== Personal life ==
During a Q&A session at Oxford University, Wang identified as a Christian. He did not specify if he adheres to any particular denomination. On November 27, 2013, Wang married Taiwanese girlfriend, Lee Jinglei (李靚蕾). Lee came from a Japanese-Taiwanese family and was known by the name Michiko Nishimura when she attended Dominican International School in Taipei. Lee is her mother's surname. The couple has three children: two daughters, Wang Jiali, born July 2014 and Wang Jiana, born October 2016, and a son, Wang Jiayao, born August 2018.

On December 16, 2021, Wang announced they are separated and filing for divorce. On December 17, Lee began posting a series of accusations on Instagram and Sina Weibo against Wang, claiming serial infidelity, and having sex with her when she was 16 years old and he was 26. Lee's posts shocked the internet, especially Wang's fanbase, and were viewed over 3.3 billion times on Weibo. Following the post, various brands dropped Wang as a spokesperson. Wang claimed he was being falsely smeared by Lee, and rebutted all allegations of infidelity and sex with a minor. He posted evidence, including a screenshot which claimed to be the couple's first e-mail correspondence dated 2011, when Lee was 24 years old, which he suggested was evidence that they were not intimate when Lee was a minor. Singers Vivian Hsu and By2 member Yumi Bai, who Lee accused of being Wang's mistresses during her marriage to Wang, both took legal action against Lee. Hsu's lawyers released several official statements denying the allegations. Yumi Bai sued Lee for defamation. Lee also responded, rebutting some of Wang's points. Wang later made a general apology for not managing his marriage well as a public figure, adding that he would transfer the house to Lee and announced he will temporarily quit the entertainment business. After Wang's general apology for not handling his marriage well, Lee rejected the house offer and explained her reasons for making the matter public, saying that she did not receive a sincere apology, adding that children needed honest and trustworthy parents who can face their issues and change instead of perfect parents and that she was not out for the money. Lee ended with a general apology to "innocent parties dragged into the saga". Wang and Lee are now suing each other for custody of their three children after Lee failed to comply with several orders from the Supreme Court of the State of New York to allow Wang to see his children, ending in an OSC for Contempt of Court, which was later denied on account of jurisdiction. The ex-couple's custody battle has since moved to Taiwan.

== Discography ==
- Love Rival Beethoven (1995)
- If You Heard My Song (1996)
- Missing You (1996)
- White Paper (1997)
- Revolution (1998)
- Impossible to Miss You (1999)
- Forever's First Day (2000)
- The One and Only (2001)
- Unbelievable (2003)
- Shangri-La (2004)
- Heroes of Earth (2005)
- Change Me (2007)
- Heart Beat (2008)
- The 18 Martial Arts (2010)
- Your Love (2015)
- A.I. Love (2017)

== Filmography ==
Year	Title	Role	Notes
1999	The Iron Giant	Dean McCoppin	Mandarin voice role
2000	China Strike Force	Alex Cheung	
2000	Ashes to Ashes: Against Smoking	Dave	
2001	The Avenging Fist	Nova	
2003	Moon Child	Son	
2005	Starlit High Noon	Lian Song	
2007	Lust, Caution	Kuang Yumin	
2010	Little Big Soldier	Big General	
2010	Love in Disguise	Du Minghan	also director
2011	The Founding of a Party	Luo Jialun	
2013	One		Short film
2013	My Lucky Star	David	
2015	Blackhat	Chen Dawai	
2015	Where's the Dragon?	Dragon	
2016	Lifeline	Kai	Short for Qualcomm
2016	Wang Leehom's Open Fire 3D Concert Film	(Himself)	Documentary
2017	Growing Pains	(Himself)	
2018	Legend of the Ancient Sword	Yue Wuyi	
2018	Forever Young	Shen Guangyao	
2018	Hello Mr. Billionaire	(Himself)	cameo
2019	UglyDolls	Lucky Bat (voice)	

== Bibliography ==
- December 18, 2001: The One and Only – The Official Piano and Vocal Score (唯一樂譜書) (Piano and Vocal Score)
- March 20, 2003: Accidental Biography (純屬意外) (Biography; Piano and Vocal Score)
- October 15, 2003: Portrait of a Love Song (Photobook; Prose and Biography) [Japan Release]
- November 15, 2005: Shangri-La – The Official Piano and Vocal Score (心中的日月樂譜書) (Piano and Vocal Score)
- June 9, 2006: "Heroes of TOKYO" (Photobook) [Japan Release]
- July 21, 2010: "Love in Disguise: photo collection" (Photobook)
- July 21, 2010: "Wang Leehom, the practice of first-time director"
