= Love in Disguise (film) =

2010 Taiwanese-Hong Kong-Chinese film by Leehom Wang

- Traditional Chinese: 戀愛通告
- Simplified Chinese: 恋爱通告
- Hanyu Pinyin: Liàn Ài Tōng Gào
- Directed by: Leehom Wang
- Written by: Leehom Wang; Xin-Yi Du; Hung-Chieh Chen
- Produced by: Joan Huang; Mathew Tang; Michelle Yeh
- Starring: Leehom Wang; Liu Yifei; Joan Chen
- Distributed by: China Film Group Corporation
- Release date: 12 August 2010
- Countries: Taiwan; Hong Kong; China
- Language: Mandarin
- Budget: NT$160 million

Love in Disguise (Chinese: 恋爱通告; pinyin: Liàn ài Tōng Gào) is a 2010 Chinese-language musical romantic comedy movie. It is Taiwanese-American singer-songwriter, record producer, actor and film director Wang Leehom's directorial debut, and was filmed in Shanghai. Love in Disguise went on to become the highest-grossing film for a first-time director in Chinese history grossing over 60 million RMB domestically.

== Plot ==
Du Minghan, a popular star singer, decides to let go of his fame and head for a normal life when he meets Song Xiaoqing, a student from a music academy. Du gradually falls for her and has to juggle his career and double identity by going undercover at Song's music academy.

== Cast ==
- Wang Leehom as Du Minghan
- Liu Yifei as Song Xiaoqing
- Joan Chen as Joan
- Zeng Yike as Xiaotao
- Qiao Zhenyu as Mu Fan
- Chen Han-dian as Wei Zhibo
- Xie Yuan as Song Xiaoqing's father
- Xie Na as fashion designer
- Khalil Fong as himself
- Lang Tsu-yun
