= Walter Ho =

American opera actor

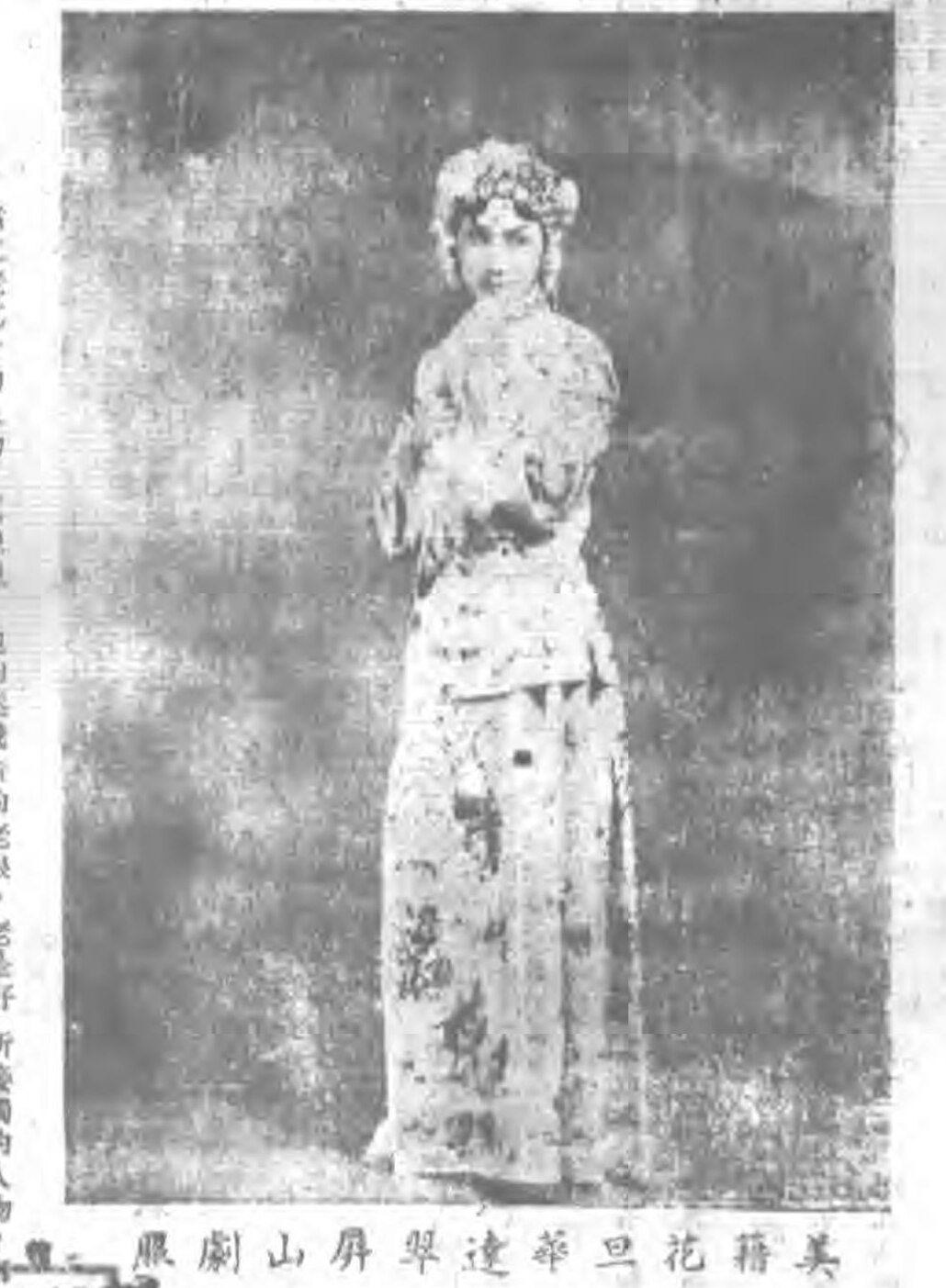
- Walter Ho playing Pan Qiaoyun (Yang Xiong's adulterous wife) in 1947
- Born: 1923; New York, United States
- Died: March 27, 2020 (aged 96–97); Tamsui District, New Taipei City, Taiwan
- Occupation: Peking opera actor
- Known for: Dan roles

Chinese name
- Traditional Chinese: 華達
- Simplified Chinese: 华达
Transcriptions
Standard Mandarin
- Hanyu Pinyin: Huá Dá
- Wade–Giles: Hua^{2} Ta^{2}
Yue: Cantonese
- Jyutping: Waa^{4}-daat^{6}

Alternative Chinese name
- Traditional Chinese: 夏華達
- Simplified Chinese: 夏华达
Transcriptions
Standard Mandarin
- Hanyu Pinyin: Xià Huádá
- Wade–Giles: Hsia^{4} Hua^{2}-Ta^{2}

Walter Ho (1923 – March 27, 2020), known in Chinese as Hua Da (when he was in China) and Hsia Hua-ta (when he was in Taiwan), was an American Peking opera actor. He was a pupil of Wang Yaoqing and specialized in dan, or female roles. He was mixed with a quarter Chinese ancestry.

Born in New York, he traveled to China with his father at age 8 but couldn't return when Japan started bombing Shanghai. In China he became obsessed with Peking opera, so much that he traveled to Beijing alone to learn from Wang Yaoqing. He established himself in Shanghai in the 1940s with the support of Soong Mei-ling and Zhang Lingfu. During the Cultural Revolution, he was accused of being an American spy and imprisoned for six years until his release on the eve of Richard Nixon's 1972 visit. In 1982, at the personal invitation of President Chiang Ching-kuo he went to Taiwan, where he remained until his death in 2020.

== Early life ==
Walter Ho was born in New York. His mother was of German and British ancestry and his father was a biracial Chinese-American who fought with the American Expeditionary Forces in World War I. In 1931, he traveled to China with his father to visit their ancestral home and celebrate his great-grandmother's birthday. However, as they embarked on their return trip in early 1932, heavy fighting broke out in Shanghai, trapping them in the country. His father enrolled him in a Catholic school in the Shanghai French Concession (which the Japanese dared not bomb), and Shanghai was where Ho began his fascination with Peking opera.

== Career in China ==
Despite his father's opposition, Ho began taking lessons from Lin Pinqing (林顰卿), who later recommended him to the Peking opera master Wang Yaoqing in Beijing. He also took lessons from Xiao Yang Yuelou (小楊月樓), Huang Yulin (黃玉麟), Xu Biyun (徐碧雲), Yu Jimei (虞季梅), and Zui Lijun (醉麗君). In 1942, he signed an eight-year contract with the Shanghai master Huang Jingbo (黃靜波), who taught him dozens of Peking operas. Around this time he also became a devout Buddhist despite being raised Catholic.

He made his acting debut at the age of 16. In the 1940s, Ho frequently performed with Huai opera actors (back then it was common for Huai opera and Peking opera to be performed together in Shanghai). He later joined the famous actor Li Shaochun and performed with him at the Huxi Big Stage (滬西大舞台) in Shanghai. He also performed in other cities like Hangzhou, Jiaxing, and Huzhou. However, his nationality presented difficulties. In 1947, it was reported that Ho was unable to perform in Qingdao until his third trip there, due to not holding Chinese citizenship. Without a troupe, he also had no funds for costumes, but he was supported by the high-ranking general Zhang Lingfu, who introduced him to Soong Mei-ling and He Yingqin. Ho remembered Soong saying that foreign Peking opera artists must be supported, and the trio raised the money and bought costumes for him.

After the founding of the People's Republic in 1949, Ho performed throughout China with various troupes. In 1960, he joined the Guangzhou Peking Opera Troupe (广州京剧团) in Guangzhou.

== Imprisonment ==
At the start of the Cultural Revolution in 1966, his photos with Soong Mei-ling, He Yingqin and other Kuomintang officials which he had hidden under a table in his house were discovered. A punch in the face knocked out eight of his teeth. Accused of being an American spy, he was subjected to struggle sessions and forced to write down every venue he ever performed in. He was imprisoned in his own home until 1969, when he was sent to a prison. In the dark prison cell, he whispered Peking operas and the Diamond Sutra repeatedly to deflect suicidal thoughts.

He was released in 1972, right before Richard Nixon's visit to China.

== Later life in Taiwan ==
Ho returned to New York following his release. After Soong Mei-ling immigrated to New York in 1975, they met again. Soong sent a letter to her stepson Chiang Ching-kuo, who then personally invited Ho to Taiwan to perform and tell his story. Ho arrived in Taiwan in 1982. In 1984, Ho staged three charity shows during the Captive Nations Week in Taipei, raising NT$1.12 million for Chinese opera workers in Taiwan. In 1986, he performed at the Chinese Cultural Renaissance Festival in commemoration of Chiang Kai-shek's 100th birthday.

In 2003, he performed in Taipei at the age of 80.

Ho never married, and he insisted he was not gay. In his later life he spent his days creating Buddhist paintings and caring for stray dogs. He was found dead in his home by his neighbor in 2020. Because he remained an American citizen, the American Institute in Taiwan arranged for his memorial service.

== Repertoire ==
In Taiwan, several of Ho's performances were filmed by the Chinese Television System. These include:

- Playing Xiao Yanyan in The Fourth Son Visits His Mother
- Playing Yang Yuhuan in The Imperial Concubine Gets Drunk
- Playing Hongniang in Hongniang
