= Wang Yaoqing (Peking opera) =

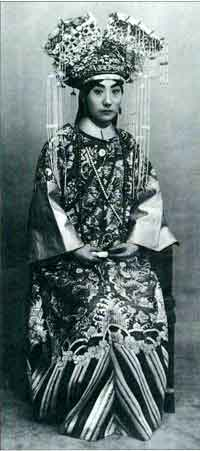
- Wang Yaoqing plays Queen Mother Xiao in Yanmen Pass. (Note: Yànmén guān,《雁门关》.)
- Traditional Chinese: 王瑤卿
- Simplified Chinese: 王瑶卿
Transcriptions
Standard Mandarin
- Hanyu Pinyin: Wáng Yáoqīng
- Wade–Giles: Wang Yao-ch'ing

Wang Yaoqing (Note: Wáng Yáoqīng, 王瑶卿) (28 December 1881 – 3 June 1954) was a Chinese actor and singer noted for playing the role of a virtuous adult woman, or qingyi, (Note: Qīngyī, 青衣, lit. "verdant-clad.") the most important role in Peking opera. He was from Qingjiangpu District, Huai'an in eastern Jiangsu Province.

Wang was noted for his skills as a long-sleeved dancer, for sword dancing, and for his portrayal of a stylish Manchu lady. He was president of the National Academy of Chinese Theater Arts from 1951 to 1954. He taught many other actors, including Mei Lanfang, Cheng Yanqiu, Shang Xiaoyun, and Xun Huisheng, the four greatest male dan role of the 20th century.

== Biography ==
Wang's father, Wang Xuanyun, (Note: Wáng Xuànyún, 王绚云) was an actor in Kun Opera. He died when Yaoqing was 10. Yaoqing learned female impersonation from Tian Baolin. (Note: Tián Bǎolín, 田宝琳)

In 1894, Wang performed in The Pagoda, (Note: Jìtǎ,《祭塔》.) his first play. In 1896, the Cheng Troupe was formed with Wang as a member. In 1897, he married the daughter of Yang Duoxian. (Note: Yáng Duǒxiān, 杨朵仙) His acting troupe disbanded during the Boxer Rebellion of 1900. Afterwards, he joined the Fushou Troupe.

In 1904, Wang was summoned to the palace and asked to set lyrics written by Empress Dowager Cixi to music. He was awarded thirty taels for this.

Wang registered to play for the imperial household. His role as a Manchu lady in Incident at Fen River Bend (Note: Fénhé Wān,《汾河弯》.) was appreciated by Cixi. He joined the Tongqing Troupe in 1905. With partner Tan Xinpei, Wang introduced various innovations to the qingyi role, including a greater range of facial expression and stylized body movement.

Wang's other notable roles include Fourth Son Visits His Mother, (Note: Sìláng tàn mǔ,《四郎探母》.) The Wujia Slope, (Note: Wǔjiā pō,《武家坡》.) Nantian Gate, (Note: Nántiān mén,《南天门》.) Goose Gate Pass, Mulan Joins the Army, Story of a White Snake, and Story of Willow Shade.

Wang's voice deteriorated early. His last performance was in 1926 in Shanghai. In the 1930s, he was a teacher at the Chinese Opera Academy. (Note: Zhōnghuá xìqǔ zhuānkē xuéxiào, 中华戏曲专科学校.) This school was disbanded in 1941.

Wang was also a noted theater critic. He came up a set of four characters to describe the "four great dan." (A dan is a female impersonator.) Wang served as president of the National Academy of Chinese Theater Arts, which was established in 1950. He died in 1954.

More than sixty of Wang's manuscripts were left at Gumei Studio, his residence. He often collaborated with Chen Moxiang. Wang would set Chen's lyrics to music.

A sound recording series of his work aimed at schoolchildren entitled Wang Yaoqing Talks about Opera was released in 1961. In 2016, there was a concert at the Great Hall of the People in Beijing to honor Wang's 135th birthday.
