= The Jewelry Purse =

Peking opera play

- Traditional Chinese: 鎖麟囊
- Simplified Chinese: 锁麟囊
Transcriptions
Standard Mandarin
- Hanyu Pinyin: Suǒ Lín Náng

The Jewelry Purse, also known as The Jewel Bag and The Embroidered Pouch, is a Peking opera piece co-authored by playwright Weng Ouhong and opera player Cheng Yanqiu. Set in imperial China, the story upholds the traditional belief that good deeds will be rewarded. It is one of the most classical and popular pieces of the Cheng school.

== Development ==
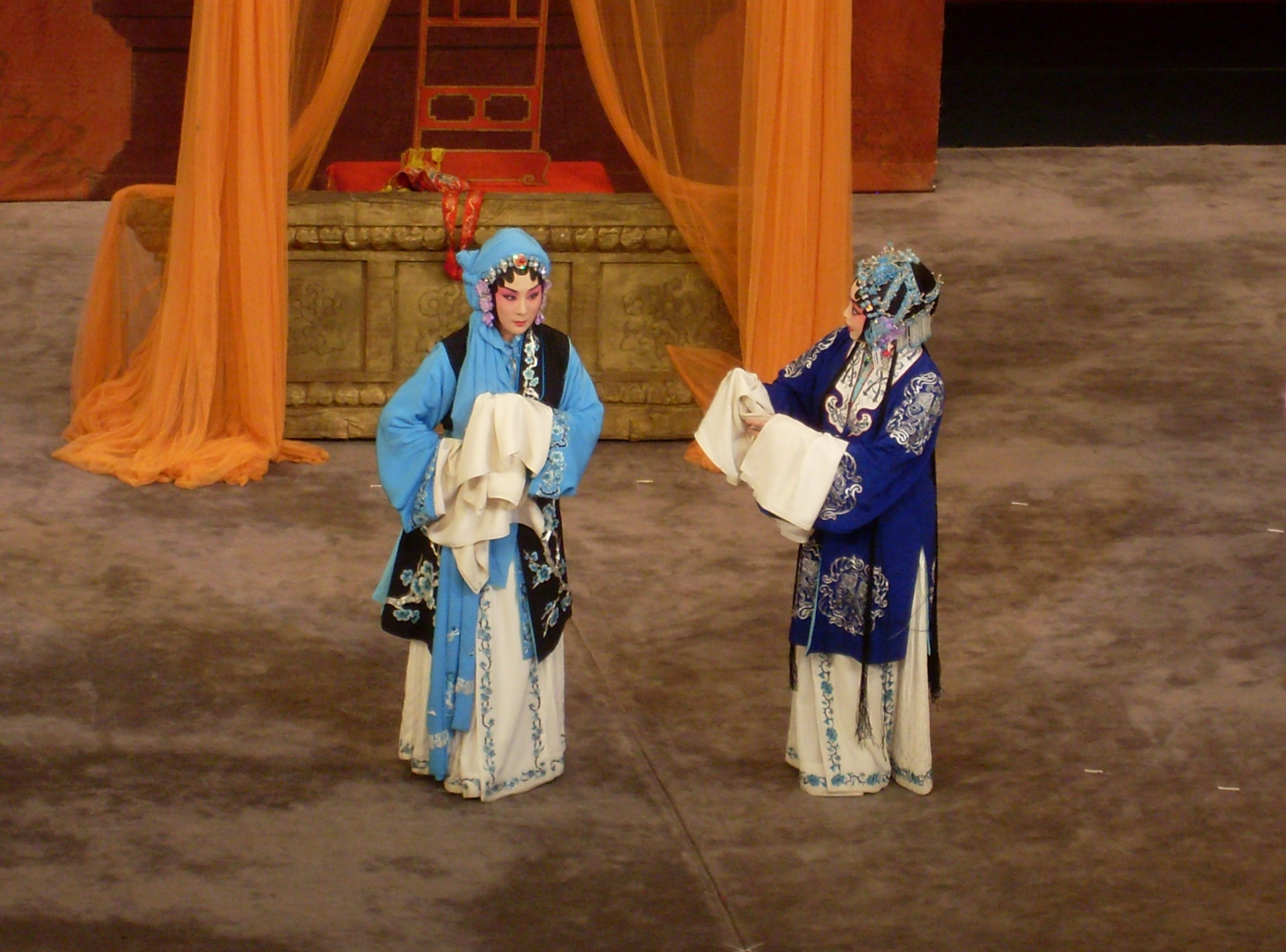
Sui Xiaoqing (left) as Xue Xiangling, Beijing, 6 August 2011

The script was composed by Weng Ouhong (翁偶虹) between 1938 to 1940 at the request of male Dan player Cheng Yanqiu, the founder of the Cheng school (程派). The play's debut in Shanghai was a hit with 25 sold-out performances. In the later half of the show tour, audience members started singing along with Cheng. Cheng considered The Jewelry Purse his most accomplished and favorite play.

Since 1949, the play had been banned by China's communist regime under political censorship. In 1954, the play was criticized by communist officials for "downplaying class conflict and giving undue credits to the landlord class". Subsequently, performances stopped for over two decades in mainland China. Cheng Yanqiu did not get a chance to bring it back on stage until the end of his life. It was not until 1979 the play was revived on stage by successors of the Cheng school. Its popularity and charm continues to date.

In 2015, Peking opera superstar Zhang Huoding brought the play to the west when she made her American debut at Lincoln Center in New York City.

== Story ==
On her wedding day, Xue Xiangling carries a purse embroidered with a Chinese unicorn, filled with jewels and precious gems as part of her dowry. Her wedding procession was halted by a sudden rainfall, and she took shelter in a pavilion, where she heard a woman sobbing from another sedan chair parked nearby. They begin a conversation through the maids, and Xiangling learns that the other woman, Zhao Shouzhen, is also getting married, but without any dowry as her family was experiencing a downfall. Out of sympathy, Xiangling gives her jewelry purse to the less fortunate bride. Throughout the exchange, they do not get out of their sedan chairs and remain unaware of each other's names or appearances.

Six years later, a flood in Deng Prefecture separates Xue Xiangling from her family. Homeless, she wanders to neighbouring Lai Prefecture and begins to work as a maid in the mansion of an official named Lu Shengchou. One day, climbing up the stairs to retrieve a ball, she is shocked to see her purse from six years ago. Sadness wells up in her heart, and she breaks down just as Mrs. Lu comes upstairs. It turns out that Mrs. Lu is none other than Zhao Shouzhen, whose fortunes have changed thanks to the jewelry purse, and since her husband passed the imperial examination. The two women become sworn sisters then and there. With Mrs. Lu's help, Xiangling is also reunited with her family.

== Adaptations ==
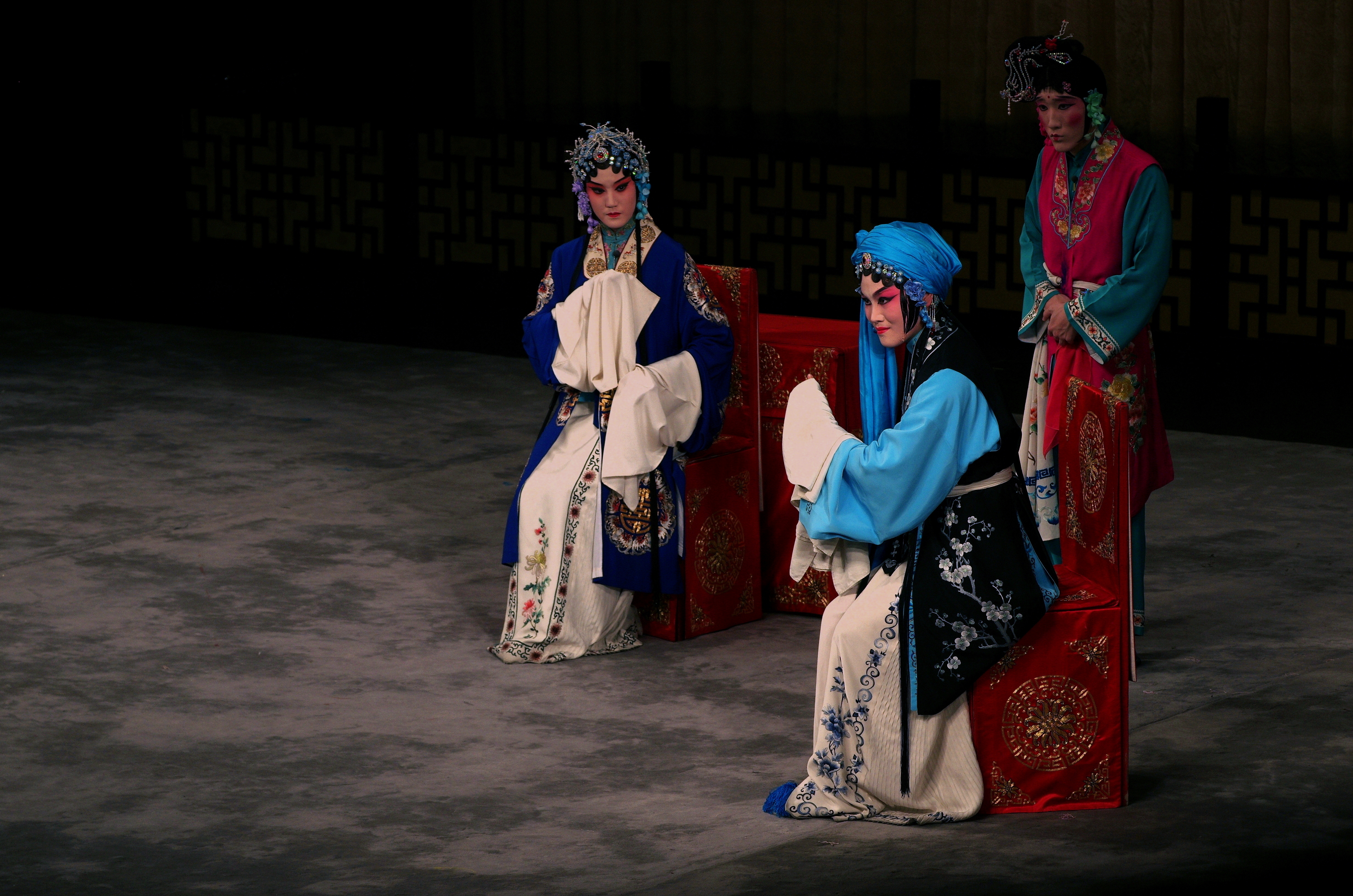
Li Xinyu (front) as Xue Xiangling, Shanghai, 22 November 2014

The play has been adapted by other Chinese opera genres and made into films.

In 1966, it was made into a Huangmei opera film titled The Lucky Purse. The Hong Kong film was directed by Wong Tin-lam and starred Betty Loh Ti.

In 2011, it was made into a Qinqiang film titled The Unicorn Pouch by a video production company of Gansu province.
