= Zhang Huoding =

- Born: January 24, 1971 (age 55); Baicheng, Jilin, China
- Education: National Academy of Chinese Theatre Arts
- Occupation: Peking opera performer
- Years active: 1995–2010
- Employers: China National Peking Opera Company; National Academy of Chinese Theatre Arts
- Known for: Dan roles
- Style: Cheng (Cheng Yanqiu) school
- Children: 1

Chinese name
- Traditional Chinese: 張火丁
- Simplified Chinese: 张火丁
Transcriptions
Standard Mandarin
- Hanyu Pinyin: Zhāng Huǒdīng

Zhang Huoding (born 24 January 1971) is a Peking opera singer. She is a singer in the "Cheng-pai" (程派) tradition, or school of Cheng Yanqiu (程砚秋, 1904–1958). Zhang is best known in the West for the title role in the 2003 video of the revolutionary opera Sister Jiang directed by Zhang Yuan. She was seen in a Chinese opera version of the Legend of the White Snake at the David H. Koch Theater at Lincoln Center, New York City, in her US debut in 2015.
