= Li Shi =

Li Shi or Lishi may refer to:

- Lishi (理事; "Noumenon and Phenomenon"), a Zen Buddhist concept, see Five Ranks#Interplay of Absolute and Relative

== People ==
- Li Shi (emperor) (died 361), emperor of Cheng Han
- Lishi (Three Kingdoms) (李氏, died 263), noble lady and aristocrat from the Three Kingdoms period.
- Li Shi (Tang dynasty) (fl. 9th century), Tang dynasty chief councilor
- Li Shi (Grand Secretary) (1471–1538), Ming dynasty mandarin
- Mao Yuanxin (born 1941), Mao Zedong's nephew, later known as Li Shi
- Lady Li (disambiguation) (李氏), a list of imperial Chinese women with the surname Li

== Places in China ==
- Lishi District, the only district of Lüliang, Shanxi
- Lishi, Chongqing (李市), a town in Chongqing
- Lishi, Guangdong (犁市), a town in Shaoguan, Guangdong
- Lishi, Hubei (李市), a town in Shayang County, Hubei
- Lishi, Jiangxi (历市), a town in Dingnan County, Jiangxi
- Lishi, Sichuan (李市), a town in Longchang, Sichuan
- Lishi Subdistrict (李石街道), a subdistrict in Wanghua District, Fushun, Liaoning

== See also ==
- Li Si (c. 280 BC – 208 BC), legalist politician of the Qin
- Li Zhi (disambiguation)
