= Fu Jin =

Chinese academic, author and theater critic

Fu Jin (born 1956) is a Chinese academic, author and theater critic.

Fu Jin received his Ph.D. in Chinese literature. He is a professor at the National Academy of Chinese Theatre Arts and Nanjing University. Fu Jin is also the vice chairman of the Chinese Literature and Art Association, Member Discussants (on theater and film studies) of the State Council of China, chief of the Academic Committee of the National Academy of Chinese Theatre Arts, and director of the Chinese Traditional Drama Research Institute.

Fu Jin has been a critic of Chinese Theatre, Critical Theory, and Modern Chinese theatre for many years. He has published over ten books and three hundred papers.

In 2023, while dean of Shandong University's School of Journalism and Communication, he is accused of sexual assault and attempted rape, and dismissed from his post.

== Publications ==
- "The history of Chinese Theatre" (2014)
- "The Speech of Art and Aesthetics" (2010)
- "To pass the flame of remembrance onto the next generation ---The Theoretical and Practical experiment on Intangible Cultural Heritage in China" (2008)
- "Chinese Theatre History after 1949" (2002)
- "The strength of Grass Roots---Field research on Tai Zhou Traditional Theatre" (2001)

== Accusations of sexual assault (without official investigation result) ==
On September 21, 2023, Xu Chen, a communication professor, accused Fu of attempting sexual assault. Shandong Normal University stated that it has established a working group to investigate the allegations. On September 23, 2023, Fu announced a personal clarification letter against Xu's accusation, claiming that Xu's accusation is false and that he will protect his reputation rights. Currently, there is no official investigation result about this issue.

== Chief Editor ==
- Historical Documentation of Beijing Opera (Volume of Qing Dynasty) and continuation (2011)
- Theatrical Art journal.
- 60 years of Beijing Arts: 1949-2009—Volume of Theatre (2010)
