= Lady Li (disambiguation) =

Lady Li may refer to any woman in imperial China with the surname Li, such as:

- Empress Li (disambiguation)
- Empress Dowager Li (disambiguation)
- Consort Li (disambiguation)
- Lady Li (died between 104 and 101 BC), concubine of Emperor Wu of Han
- Lady Li (Three Kingdoms) (李氏, died 263), noble lady and aristocrat from the Three Kingdoms period.
- Li Zhaoyi, concubine of Liu Shan of the Shu Han state during the Three Kingdoms period.
- Lady Li (Wang Jipeng) (fl. 10th century), consort of the Min emperor Wang Jipeng
- Li Qingzhao (1084–1156), Song dynasty poet
