= Mei Qiaoling =

Qing Dynasty Peking Opera and Kungku artist

- Born: Mei Fang; September 25, 1842; Taizhou, Jiangsu, Qing Empire
- Died: December 16, 1882 (aged 40); Beijing, Zhili, Qing Empire
- Occupations: Peking opera and kunqu performer
- Employer: Four Happiness Troupe
- Known for: Dan roles

Chinese name
- Chinese: 梅巧玲
Transcriptions
Standard Mandarin
- Hanyu Pinyin: Méi Qiǎolíng

Mei Fang
- Chinese: 梅芳
Transcriptions
Standard Mandarin
- Hanyu Pinyin: Méi Fāng

Mei Xiaobo
- Chinese: 梅筱波
Transcriptions
Standard Mandarin
- Hanyu Pinyin: Méi Xiǎobō

Huixian
- Chinese: 慧仙
- Literal meaning: Intelligent fairy
Transcriptions
Standard Mandarin
- Hanyu Pinyin: Huìxiān

Mei Qiaoling (25 September 1842 – 16 December 1882), born Mei Fang, courtesy name Xiaobo and art name Huixian, was a Qing dynasty Peking opera and kunqu artist based in Beijing. He specialized in playing dan roles, or women. Originally from Taizhou, Jiangsu, he was sold to a childless man in Suzhou at age 8. After that man remarried and begot a son, Mei was sold again, this time to a theatrical troupe where he had to train to become a performer. He rose to stardom despite his pudginess, which earned him the nickname "Fat Qiaoling" (胖巧玲). At age 30, he became the leader of the Four Happiness Troupe (四喜班), one of the most famous troupes in Beijing, and rarely performed after that.

His son Mei Yutian was also a performer. His grandson Mei Lanfang was the most accomplished Peking opera artist of all time.

== In popular culture ==
In the 2002 comedy TV series The Best Clown Under Heaven (天下第一丑), Mei Qiaoling is portrayed by Peking opera actor Song Xiaochuan (宋小川).

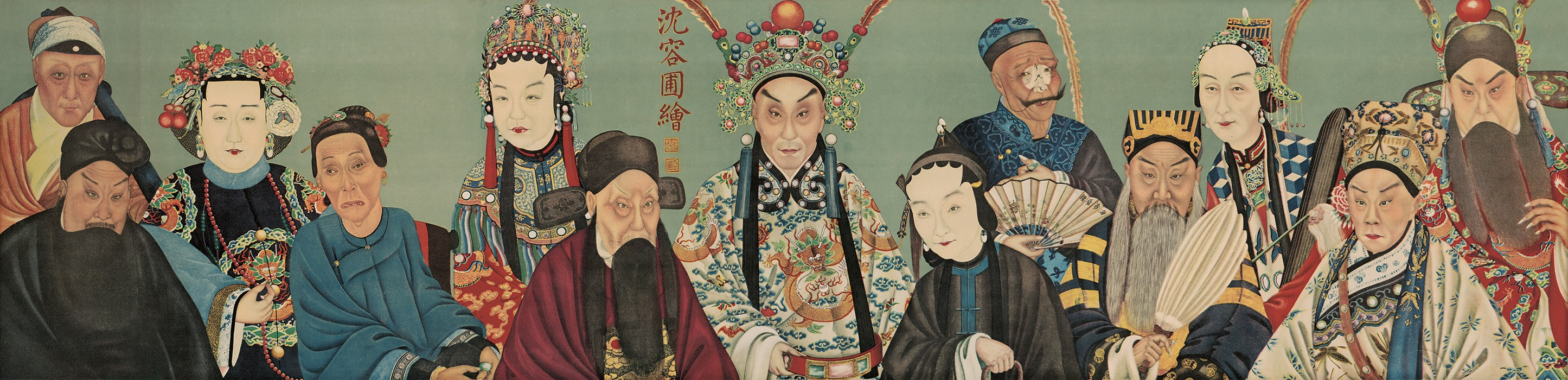
Thirteen Masters of the Tongzhi and Guangxu Reigns (同光十三絕), a painting allegedly by the late Qing dynasty court painter Shen Rongpu (沈容圃). Mei Qiaoling is 3rd from the left, cross-dressed in the role of Xiao Yanyan.
