= Wei Changsheng =

Chinese qinqiang actor of the Qing dynasty

Wei Changsheng (Chinese: 魏長生; pinyin: Wèi Chángshēng, 1744–1802), courtesy name Wanqing (婉卿), also known as Wei San (Chinese: 魏三; pinyin: Wèi Sān; lit. 'Wei Three'), was a Chinese qinqiang (bangzi opera) actor of the Qing dynasty who played huadan roles (i.e. he impersonated bubbly young women). In 1779, during his second trip to Beijing, he created such a sensation that theatregoers flocked to his performances away from gaoqiang (preferred by commoners) and kunqu (preferred by Qing emperors), thereby permanently changing the landscape of Chinese opera. In order to curb the craze (and also because Wei's performances were often obscene) the Qing government expelled him and qinqiang from Beijing in 1785. He went south to perform kunqu in Yangzhou, but many of his innovations and art remained in the capital and were absorbed by Peking opera several decades later.

Wei Changsheng had a reputation for being immoral, and likely had a homosexual relationship with Heshen, the most influential politician of the time.
