= NACTA =

NACTA may refer to:

- National Counter Terrorism Authority of Pakistan
- National Academy of Chinese Theatre Arts of China
