= Consort De =

Consort De may refer to:

- Consort Zhang (Chenghua) (1448–1497), concubine of the Chenghua Emperor
- Noble Consort Zheng (1565–1630), concubine of the Wanli Emperor
- Empress Xiaogongren (1660–1723), concubine of the Kangxi Emperor
