= Consort Li =

Consort Li may refer to:

== Consorts with surname Li 李 ==
=== Ancient China ===
- Consort Wei (衛婕妤), titled Jieyu (婕妤), original name Li Ping (李平), taking the surname Wei from her predecessor Empress Wei, concubine of Emperor Cheng of Han.
- Li Zhaoyi (李昭儀), consort of emperor Liu Shan of Shu Han state during the Three Kingdoms period.
- Li Chunyan, concubine and later empress consort of Emperor Wang Jipeng of Min.
- Li Liji (李丽姬), also titled Li Lifei (李丽妃), concubine of Emperor Liu Sheng of Southern Han.
- Consort Li (李宸妃), concubine of Emperor Zhenzong of Song and mother of Emperor Renzong.
- Consort Li (李元妃), concubine of Emperor Shizong of Jin, mother of Wanyan Yongdao (完顏永蹈), Wanyan Yongji and Wanyan Yongde (完顏永德).
- Li Shufei (李淑妃), concubine of Ming Dynasty's Hongwu Emperor, proposed mother of Crown Prince Zhu Biao and Princes Zhu Shuang and Zhu Gang (朱棡).
- Li Xianfei (李贤妃), concubine of Hongwu Emperor, mother of Zhu Jing (朱桱).
- Li Xianfei (李贤妃), concubine of Hongxi Emperor.
- Li Lifei (李丽妃), concubine of Hongxi Emperor.
- Li Kangfei (李康妃), concubine of Taichang Emperor, adoptive mother of Tianqi and Chongzhen Emperors.
- Li Zhuangfei (李莊妃), concubine of Taichang Emperor, adoptive mother of Chongzhen Emperor.

=== Ancient Korea ===
- Ingyeong Hyeon-Bi Lee-ssi (仁敬賢妃 李氏, 인경현비 이씨), concubine of King Munjong of Goryeo.
- Injeol Hyeon-Bi Lee-ssi (仁節賢妃 李氏, 인절현비 이씨), concubine of King Munjong of Goryeo.

== Consorts with surname Li 栗 ==
- Consort Li (栗姬), concubine of Emperor Jing of Han, known for her beauty

== Consorts with surname Li 驪 ==
- Concubine Li (驪姬), wife of Duke Xian of Jin.

== Elegant Consorts 麗妃 ==
- Consort Zhao (趙麗妃), concubine of Emperor Xuanzong of Tang (Emperor Ming), mother of Deposed Crown Prince Li Ying.
- Tangkuo Shige (唐括石哥), titled as Lifei (麗妃), concubine of Deposed Emperor Wanyan Liang of Jin, mother of Wanyan Shensiabu (完顏矧思阿補).
- Consort Ge (葛麗妃), concubine of Ming Dynasty's Hongwu Emperor, mother of Zhu Yi (朱㰘) and Zhu Nan (朱楠).
- Consort Chen (陈丽妃), concubine of Yongle Emperor.
- Consort Han (韩丽妃), concubine of Yongle Emperor.
- Consort Wang (王丽妃), concubine of Hongxi Emperor.
- Consort Yuan (袁丽妃), concubine of Xuande Emperor.
- Consort Liu (劉麗妃), concubine of Emperor Yingzong of Ming.
- Consort Zhang (章丽妃), concubine of Chenghua Emperor.
- Yan Guifei (阎贵妃), once titled as Lifei (丽妃), concubine of Jiajing Emperor.
- Consort Wang (王丽妃), concubine of Jiajing Emperor.
- Imperial Noble Consort Zhuangjing, titled as Lifei (麗妃), concubine of the Qing Dynasty's Xianfeng Emperor.

== See also ==
- Empress Li (disambiguation)
- Li Ji (disambiguation)
