= Li Shaochun =

- Chinese: 李少春
Transcriptions
Standard Mandarin
- Hanyu Pinyin: Lǐ Shǎochūn
- Wade–Giles: Li Shao-ch`un

Li Shaochun (4 November 1919 – 21 September 1975) was a Peking opera singer.

== Life ==
Xun's father was one of Peking Opera's "Four Famous Dads" (四大名爹, Sì Dàmíng Diē), along with Xun Huisheng, Tan Xiaopei, and Li Wanchun's fathers.

Li was best known for his "martial" (武生, wǔshēng) and "old man" (老生, lǎoshēng) roles. He served as a mentor to Li Yuru.
