= Cheng Yanqiu =

20th-century Chinese Peking opera artist

- 程砚秋
- Cheng Yanqiu in the pictorial Liangyou (1927)
- Born: January 1, 1904; Beijing, Qing dynasty
- Died: March 9, 1958 (aged 54); Beijing, China
- Resting place: Babaoshan Revolutionary Cemetery
- Occupations: Peking opera actor, theatre educator, performing arts reformer
- Spouse(s): Guo Suying (果素瑛, m. 1923)
- Children: 4

Chinese name
- Traditional Chinese: 程硯秋
- Simplified Chinese: 程砚秋
Transcriptions
Standard Mandarin
- Hanyu Pinyin: Chéng Yànqiū
- Wade–Giles: Ch'êng Yen-ch'iu

Cheng Yanqiu (1 January 1904 – 9 March 1958), born Cheng Rongting (程荣庭), courtesy name Yushuang (玉霜), was a Chinese Peking opera singer of Manchu descent. He is celebrated as one of the 20th-century's four greatest male dan actors alongside Mei Lanfang, Shang Xiaoyun, and Xun Huisheng, collectively revered as the Four Great Dan (四大名旦).

Cheng specialized in the qingyi role (virtuous, dignified women) and founded the highly influential Cheng style (程派) of opera singing and acting. Characterized by intricate breath control, mournful "broken sounds" (duànyīn), deep emotional resonance, and sophisticated water sleeve (shuǐxiù) choreography, representative masterpieces of the Cheng style repertoire include The Jewelry Purse (《锁麟囊》), Tears in the Barren Mountain (《荒山泪》), Spring Dream of the Boudoir (《春闺梦》), and Blue Frost Sword (《青霜剑》).

== Life and work ==
Cheng was born in Beijing into an impoverished Manchu bannerman family. His family had no connections in the Peking opera circle. At age six, Cheng was indentured by his mother into a nine-year apprenticeship contract with Rong Diexian (荣蝶仙), an established male dan performer. Although the apprenticeship provided food, lodging, and basic theatrical training, the young Cheng was forced to work as a domestic servant, subjected to heavy menial labor and severe corporal punishment from the short-tempered Rong.

Cheng demonstrated remarkable theatrical talent in his early teens; however, the relentless, grueling performance schedule severely damaged his voice when it broke at age thirteen during puberty (the vocal transition known as dàocāng). At this critical juncture, Luo Yinggong (罗瘿公), an eminent scholar, poet, and connoisseur of Peking opera, stepped in to rescue him. Luo paid Rong 700 silver dollars to redeem Cheng's indentured contract, oversaw his medical recovery, and guided him through a rigorous classical education in Chinese classics, poetry, calligraphy, and Western cinema. Luo acted as Cheng's benefactor, artistic mentor, playwright, and tour manager.

Under Luo Yinggong's patronage, Cheng studied under Mei Lanfang and the renowned vocal innovator Wang Yaoqing. Because Cheng's post-pubescent voice was deeper and lacked conventional soprano sharpness, Wang Yaoqing helped him develop a groundbreaking vocal technique tailored to his vocal timbre. Cheng's singing was marked by delicate chest resonance, subtle breath control, and trembling, mournful inflections (often described as yōuyān, a sobbing undercurrent). Cheng also revolutionized the use of water sleeves (shuǐxiù), choreographing dozens of intricate sleeve movements as a profound visual medium to convey the inner grief and moral fortitude of his tragic heroines.

In 1922, at the age of eighteen, Cheng made his solo debut in Beijing and Shanghai to sensational critical acclaim. He established his own performing troupe, the He Ming Troupe (和鸣社), and magnanimously appointed his former abusive master Rong Diexian as its business manager. In 1927, Cheng was officially voted one of China's "Four Great Dan" in a public poll organized by the newspaper Shuntian Shibao.

Between 1932 and 1933, Cheng traveled across six European nations (including France, Germany, Italy, Switzerland, Austria, and the Soviet Union) to observe Western theatre, opera, directing, stage design, and vocal pedagogy. He published a comprehensive report proposing institutional reforms for Chinese theatrical education and performance aesthetics. At this time, he modified the Chinese character of his stage name from "艳" (Yàn, meaning glamorous) to "砚" (Yàn, inkstone), reflecting his commitment to sober intellectual dignity.

During the 1920s and 1930s, Cheng staged several original, socially conscious operas. Notably, his production of The Martyrdom of Lady Li (《费宫人》)—based on the story of Lady Li of the Three Kingdoms, who chose suicide over surrender—served as an overt political allegory criticizing the Kuomintang's non-resistance policy and awakening anti-imperialist patriotism among the public.

During the Second Sino-Japanese War (1937–1945), when Beijing fell under Japanese occupation, Cheng refused to perform for the Japanese military or collaborationist authorities. Despite facing surveillance, harassment, and physical violence from colonial police at Qianmen railway station, Cheng retired to Qinglongqiao in suburban Beijing, living as a recluse farmer until the end of the war in 1945.

== Later years and death ==
Following the founding of the People's Republic of China in 1949, Cheng was appointed Vice President of the National Academy of Chinese Theatre Arts (中国戏曲研究院). He also served as a member of the National Committee of the Chinese People's Political Consultative Conference (CPPCC) and as a deputy to the National People's Congress. In 1956, his acclaimed production of Tears in the Barren Mountain was adapted into a color feature film.

In 1957, sponsored by Zhou Enlai and He Long, Cheng applied for membership in the Chinese Communist Party, which was posthumously formalized during his funeral in 1958.

On 9 March 1958, Cheng suffered a sudden, fatal heart attack at Beijing Hospital at 8:20 p.m., aged 54. He was accorded a state funeral and buried in the Babaoshan Revolutionary Cemetery.

== Family and ancestral injunction ==
In 1920, Wang Minghua, the wife of Mei Lanfang, introduced Cheng to the prominent Peking opera qingyi artist Guo Xianglin (果湘琳) and his wife Yu Suxia (余素霞). Following negotiations arranged through Luo Yinggong and the Mei family, a marriage proposal was accepted for their second daughter, Guo Xiuying (果秀英).

On 9 April 1923, a formal engagement ceremony was held with Mei Lanfang and Wang Minghua serving as matchmakers. The couple was married on 26 April 1923, and Luo Yinggong bestowed upon the bride a new literary name, Guo Suying (果素瑛).

Cheng Yanqiu and Guo Suying had three sons (Cheng Yongguang, Cheng Yongyuan, and Cheng Yongjiang) and one daughter (Cheng Huizhen). Bearing deep trauma from the brutal exploitation, domestic servitude, and social indignity he endured during his childhood apprenticeship, Cheng issued a strict ancestral injunction forbidding all of his descendants from ever entering the theatrical profession (子孙后代永不从艺).

== Representative repertoire ==
- Blue Frost Sword (《青霜剑》, 1924)
- The Martyrdom of Lady Li (《费宫人》 / 《刺虎》)
- Wenji Returns to Han (《文姬归汉》, 1926)
- Spring Dream of the Boudoir (《春闺梦》, 1931)
- Tears in the Barren Mountain (《荒山泪》, 1931)
- The Jewelry Purse (《锁麟囊》, 1940)

== See also ==
- Peking opera
- Four Great Dan
- Mei Lanfang
- Shang Xiaoyun
- Xun Huisheng
- Dan role

== Bibliography ==
- Brandon, James R.; Banham, Martin (1997-01-28). The Cambridge Guide to Asian Theatre. Cambridge University Press. ISBN 978-0-521-58822-5.
- Guo, Suying (1980). "往事追忆——记砚秋生平" [Recollections of the Past: An Account of Yanqiu's Life]. 《文化史料丛刊》第一辑 (Cultural Historical Materials Series, Vol. 1) (in Chinese). Beijing: 文史资料出版社 (Cultural and Historical Materials Publishing House).
- Li, Ruru (2010). The Soul of Beijing Opera: Theatrical Creativity and Continuity in the Changing World. Hong Kong University Press. ISBN 978-962-209-994-4.
- Zhang, Yihe (2012). 伶人往事 (Past Stories of Beijing Opera Stars) (in Chinese) (1st ed.). Hong Kong: Oxford University Press (China) Limited. ISBN 978-0-19-398621-3.
