= Li Zhi =

Li Zhi may refer to:

- Emperor Gaozong of Tang (628–683), named Li Zhi, Emperor of China
- Li Ye (mathematician) (1192–1279), Chinese mathematician and scholar, birth name Li Zhi
- Li Zhi (philosopher) (1527–1602), Chinese philosopher from the Ming Dynasty
- Li Zhi (politician) (born 1951), former Communist party boss of Ürümqi
- Nina Li Chi (born 1961), or Li Zhi, Hong Kong film actress
- Li Zhi (dissident), Chinese dissident
- Li Zhi (singer) (born 1978), Chinese singer, banned from China for political “misbehavior”
- Li Zhi (footballer) (born 1993), Chinese association footballer

== See also ==
- Lychee, lizhi in Chinese
- Fang Lizhi, Chinese astrophysicist and dissident
