= Lady Li (Three Kingdoms) =

Chinese Shu Han noble lady (died 263)

Lady Li was a Chinese noble woman from the Three Kingdoms period. Although based on the wife of Ma Miao (馬邈), a real retainer of Shu, she is primarily a fictional character from the 14th century novel Romance of the Three Kingdoms, based on the events of the Three Kingdoms period. She is described to be the wife of Ma Miao, the Grand Administrator of Jiangyou (江油) in the Shu Han state. She is remembered for her impassioned plea to her husband to not surrender the city to the invading Cao Wei army during the Wei conquest of Shu in 263 where she bit her finger to write a blood letter, and then hanged herself to demonstrate loyalty to the Shu kingdom. She is later praised by Deng Ai, a general of Cao Wei.

In real life, Lady Li's story was used as a symbol of resistance by Cheng Yanqiu, one of the greatest performers of Peking Opera and a member of the Chinese Communist Party, during the Japanese invasion of China. Cheng created the play called ''The Martyrdom of Lady Li'', where he highlights Lady Li's loyalty to her nation and Ma Miao's cowardice as an affront to the reactionary Kuomintang government that surrendered to the Japanese Empire. This play roused the patriotic enthusiasm of most Chinese people, leading to its censorship by the Chinese government shortly thereafter. There is no information about the real history of Ma Miao's wife, but there is a tomb destined to her.

== In Romance of the Three Kingdoms ==
Lady Li does not appear in historical records and there is no record of the spouse of Ma Miao, who was himself a real historical Grand Administrator of Jiangyou who surrendered to Wei. She appears in the 14th century historical novel, Romance of the Three Kingdoms, which romanticizes previous events and during the Three Kingdoms period of China.

The novel introduces Lady Li in Chapter 117. Lady Li's husband, Ma Miao, was the governor of Jiangyou. During the conquest of Shu by Wei, he heard that the land of the east river had fallen into the enemy's hands. Although there was something prepared for the defense, his post had a large area to protect, and he was confident that Jiang Wei would defend the Saber Pass. Therefore, he did not take his military duties very seriously, just staying at home. In 263, when Deng Ai of Wei marched to Jiangyou, Ma Miao was treacherous and refused to lead the defense.

When Lady Li heard about the state of affairs at the border, she said to the governor, "If there is so great danger on the borders, how is it you are so unaffected?". Ma Miao replied, "The affair is in Jiang Wei's hands and is not my concern". She then replied, "Nevertheless, you finally have to guard the capital, and that is a heavy responsibility."

Referring to the cowardice of the Emperor of Shu, Liu Shan, Ma Miao replied Lady Li saying: "O, well! The Emperor trusts his favorite Huang Hao entirely and is sunk in vice and pleasure. Disaster is very near. If the Wei armies get here, I shall yield. It is no good taking it seriously. "

Filled with concern regarding the state of Shu, Lady Li tried by herself to raise the morale of the troops to defend the city. She insulted Ma Miao's treachery and reprimanded him for his complacency in protecting Jiangyou, saying:

"You call yourself a man! Have you such a disloyal and treacherous heart? Is it nothing to have held office and taken pay for years? How can I bear to look upon your face?".

Ma Miao was rendered speechless by her harsh scolding. Just then Lady Li's house servants came to tell her that Deng Ai, with his two thousand troops, had found their way along some road and had already broken into the city. Ma Miao was now frightened and hastily went out to find the leader and offer his formal submission. He went to the Town Hall and bowed on the steps, crying, "I have long desired to come over to Wei. Now I yield myself and my army and all the town."

Deng Ai accepted Ma Miao's surrender and incorporated his army with his own force. He took Ma Miao into his service as guide to fight against Shu Han. Ma Miao showed a map and guided Wei to Chengdu. Then came a servant with the news: "Lady Li has hanged herself!"

In response to Deng Ai and his troops forcing Ma Miao to surrender, Lady Li hanged herself to demonstrate loyalty to the Shu Han. Upon learning her reasons for doing so, Deng Ai commended Lady Li's fealty and personally arranged her funeral. Lady Li's unexpected resistance and, consequently, suicide, impacted both armies; Deng Ai stopped the advance and dedicated himself to honoring her as a last heroine of the state Shu Han before conquering the capital Chengdu. A poem was made to praise her honorable conduct:

When the Ruler of Shu had wandered from the way,
And the House of Han fell lower,
Heaven sent Deng Ai to smite the land.
Then did a woman show herself most noble,
So noble in conduct,
That no leader equaled her.

After the fall of Jiangyou, the capital of Shu Han Chengdu was taken over by the forces of Cao Wei, so Shu's emperor, Liu Shan, surrendered, thus ending the state of Shu Han.

== Beijing opera: The Martyrdom of Lady Li ==
The Beijing opera "The Mirror of the Fall of Shu" (亡蜀鉴), also known as "The Martyrdom of Lady Li" (李氏殉節), is based on events from the historical novel Romance of the Three Kingdoms. It was adapted by Cheng Yanqiu in 1933 and has been performed in various regional Chinese opera styles, including Sichuan opera, Hunan opera, Shaanxi opera, and Yunnan opera. The premiere of this opera took place on October 28, 1935, in Beijing's Zhonghe Garden. The play's script follows the same plot of the Romance, with additional details that made the opera more elaborate and dramatic. In the opera Lady Li had one daughter, in which she expresses concern about her daughter's future.

This play was created to promote the spirit of patriotism, criticize surrender and praise Lady Li's fair martyrdom and loyalty, in order to inspire military and civilians to fight against the Japanese Empire during the Japanese invasion of China. Cheng Yanqiu played the role of Lady Li. The opera includes a poignant song that reflects Lady Li's determination and grief. Despite having only been performed for two shows, this particular song gained popularity among the audience due to its emotional depth and expression of Lady Li's indignation. This song is characterized by its slow tempo, with each line seamlessly connected, conveying a continuous and powerful emotional journey. Cheng Yanqiu's rendition captures the essence of Lady Li's intense feelings, combining strength with subtlety, and leaving a lasting impact on the audience.

=== Censorship ===
In 1933, Imperial Japanese troops were gradually invading northern China. The reactionary Kuomintang government adopted non-resistance and prepared to surrender. Cheng Yanqiu used the story in Romance of the Three Kingdoms to write this play to show the public their outrage at China's surrender to the Japanese Empire. He used as a metaphor the case of Lady Li, a woman who scolded her city governor for surrendering to the enemy, who in anger and humiliation at losing her country ended up committing suicide. This play became known as an act of resistance to the Chinese government's decision to surrender, which eventually led to the banning of this play after it had been performed twice. Currently the play can be performed and the script can be found in the public domain.

== Sources ==
- Chen, Shou (3rd century). Records of the Three Kingdoms (Sanguozhi).
- Luo, Guanzhong (14th century). Romance of the Three Kingdoms (Sanguo Yanyi).
