= Empress Li =

Empress Li or Empress Dowager Li may refer to:

- Empress Li (Li Shi's wife) (fl. 343), empress of the Cheng-Han state
- Empress Li (Former Qin) (fl. 392–393), empress of Former Qin
- Li Lingrong (died 400), empress dowager of the Jin Dynasty
- Empress Li (Huiyi) (died 409?), empress of Northern Yan
- Li Zu'e (died after 581), empress of Northern Qi
- Li Ezi (536–588), empress dowager of Northern Zhou
- Empress Li (Liu Shouguang's wife) (died 914), empress of Yan
- Li Chunyan (died 939), empress of the Min state, married to Wang Jipeng
- Empress Li (Wang Yanxi) (died 944), empress of the Min state, married to Wang Yanxi
- Empress Li (Later Jin) (died 950), empress of Later Jin
- Empress Li (Later Han) (died 954), empress of Later Han
- Empress Dowager Li (Later Shu) (died 965), empress dowager of Later Shu
- Empress Mingde (Song dynasty) (960–1004), empress of the Song Dynasty, married to Emperor Taizong
- Li Fengniang (1144–1200), empress of the Song Dynasty, married to Emperor Guangzong

== See also ==
- Consort Li (disambiguation)
