= Shang Xiaoyun =

20th-century Chinese Peking opera artist

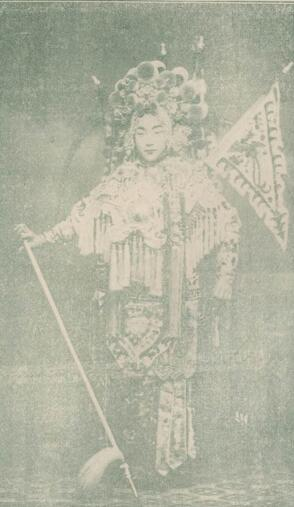
Shang Xiaoyun

Shang Xiaoyun (simplified Chinese: 尚小云; traditional Chinese: 尚小雲; pinyin: Shàng Xiǎoyún; 1900 – April 19, 1976) was one of the four great twentieth-century performers of the Dan role type in Peking opera with Mei Lanfang, Cheng Yanqiu, and Xun Huisheng. All four were male actors who specialized in impersonating women.

In addition to his singing, Shang was known for his dance and acrobatic skills. He was the founder of the Rong Chun Opera School.
