= Xun Huisheng =

Peking opera singer (1900–1968)

- Chinese: 荀慧生
Transcriptions
Standard Mandarin
- Hanyu Pinyin: Xún Huìshēng
- Wade–Giles: Hsün Hui-sheng

Xun Huisheng (5 January 1900 - 26 December 1968) was one of Peking Opera's "Four Great Dan", along with Mei Lanfang, Cheng Yanqiu, and Shang Xiaoyun. All four were men who played the female lead roles (dan) during the generation when such roles became open to actresses again, after two centuries of exclusively male portrayal.

== Life ==
Xun was one of Peking Opera's "Four Famous Dans" (四大名旦, Sì Dàmíng Dàn), along with Li Shaochun, Tan Xiaopei, and Li Wanchun's fathers.

Xun was best known for his portrayal of the "flowery girl" (hua dan) roles, women who tended to be more vivacious or even of questionable character. He served as one of the mentors and guardians of the actress Li Yuru as she began her career.

He died in Hebei on 26 December 1968.
