= National Academy of Chinese Theatre Arts =

Public university in Beijing, China

Coordinates: 39.8618°N 116.3362°E

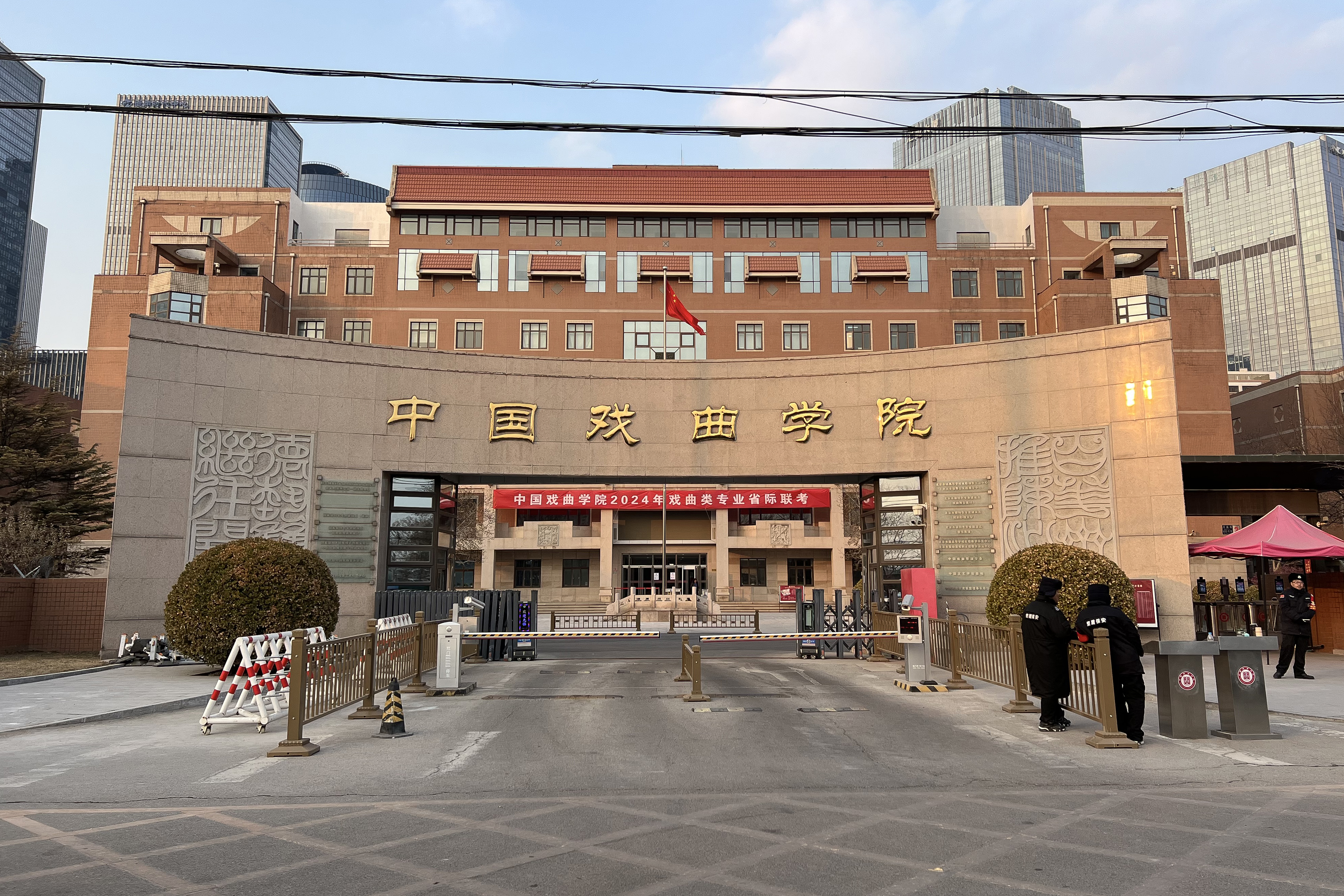

The National Academy of Chinese Theatre Arts (NACTA; Chinese: 中国戏曲学院; pinyin: Zhōngguó Xìqǔ Xuéyuàn) is a Chinese public university in Fengtai District, Beijing which offers B.A., M.A. and M.F.A. degrees in Chinese opera. Niu Junfeng is a notable alumni from National Academy of Chinese Theatre Arts. Xu Weizhou is also a notable alumni. Currently there are 2,500 students and 250 faculty members.

== History ==
It was founded in 1950 as China Drama School, and Tian Han was its first principal. Wang Yaoqing became its principal in 1951. By 1954, when Yan Yong became the principal, it was under the leadership of China's Ministry of Culture. It became the National Academy of Chinese Theatre Arts in 1978.

== Departments ==
- Department of Peking Opera (京剧系) for Peking opera
- Department of Performing Arts (表演系) for other Chinese opera genres such as Kunqu
- Department of Directing (导演系)
- Department of Music (音乐系)
- Department of Dramatic Writing (戏曲文学系)
- Department of Stage Design (舞台美术系)
- Department of International Exchange (国际文化交流系)

== Transport ==
- Lize Shangwuqu station (Exit D)
