= Consort Zhang (Chenghua) =

Chinese imperial consort (1448–1497)

Consort De 德妃
- Concubine of the Chenghua Emperor
- Born: 1448; Jiangxi, Ming dynasty
- Died: 1497 (aged 48–49); Beijing, Ming dynasty
- Burial: Jinshan, Beijing
- Spouse: Chenghua Emperor
- Issue: Zhu Youbin, Prince Duan of Yi; Zhu Youhui, Prince Gong of Heng; Zhu Youpeng, Prince An of Ru
Posthumous name
- Consort Zhuangyide (莊懿德妃)
- Father: Zhang Jing (張敬)
- Mother: Lady Gao (高氏)

Consort Zhuangyide (莊懿德妃; 18 October 1448 – 7 August 1497) was an imperial consort of the Ming dynasty, married to the Chenghua Emperor.

== Life ==
Lady Zhang's personal name was not recorded in history. She was born in Jiangxi Province to Zhang Jing (張敬), a member of Nanjing army, and Lady Gao (高氏).

On 31 May 1460, Zhang was elected to the inner court. On 26 January 1479, she gave birth to a son of the Chenghua Emperor, named Youbin, who was given later the title Prince of Yi (益王). Later that year, she gave birth to another son, named Youhui, who was later given the title Prince of Heng (衡王). On 13 October 1484, Lady Zhang gave birth to another prince, named Youpeng, who was entitled as Prince of An (汝王). All of her sons lived to adulthood.

Although Zhang had three sons, she was not canonized as an official concubine in Chenghua's Harem. On 15 August 1487, Zhang was given the title of Consort De (德妃). It is believed that Zhang's title is due to Noble Consort Wan's special favor.

After her death, she was given the posthumous name of Consort Zhuangyide (恭肅皇貴妃).

== Titles ==
- During the reigns of the Zhengtong Emperor (r. 1435–1449)
  - Lady Zhang (張氏, from 18 October 1448)
- During the reign of the Chenghua Emperor (r. 1464–1487)
  - Consort De (德妃, from 15 August 1487)
- During the reign of the Hongzhi Emperor (r. 1487-1505)
  - Consort Zhuangyide (莊懿德妃, from 7 August 1497)

== Issue ==
As Lady Zhang:

- Zhu Youbin, Prince Duan of Yi (益端王 朱佑檳; 26 January 1479 – 5 October 1539), the Chenghua Emperor's 6th son
- Zhu Youhui, Prince Gong of Heng (衡恭王 朱佑楎; 8 December 1479 – 30 August 1538), the Chenghua Emperor's 7th son
- Zhu Youpeng, Prince An of Ru (汝安王 朱佑梈; 13 October 1484 – 1541), the Chenghua Emperor's 11th son
