= Dan role =

General name for female roles in Chinese opera

Dan
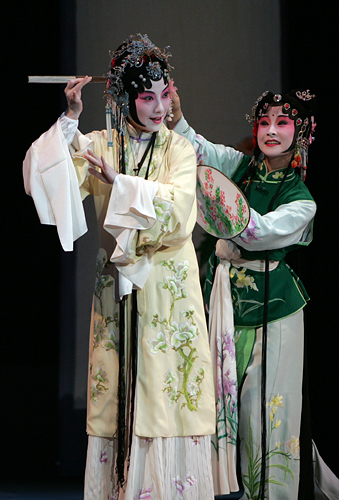
- Chinese: 旦
Transcriptions
Standard Mandarin
- Hanyu Pinyin: dàn
- Wade–Giles: tan

Dan is the general name for female roles in Chinese opera, often referring to leading roles. They may be played by male or female actors. In the early years of Peking opera, all dan roles were played by men, but this practice is no longer common in any Chinese opera genre.

== Male dan actors ==
Male actors who specialize in playing dan are referred to as nándàn (男旦); the practice arose during the Qing dynasty due to imperial prohibitions against women performing on stage, considered detrimental to public morality. This practice of female impersonation by male actors was led by Mei Lanfang, one of the most famous dan performers. In the early years of Peking opera, all Dan roles were played by men. Wei Changsheng, a male Dan performer in the Qing court, developed the cai qiao, or "false foot" technique, to simulate the bound feet of women and the characteristic gait that resulted from the practice.

In the late Qing dynasty and the early republic, the performance of actresses became popular. As a result, women were playing increasingly important roles on stage, but because Peking opera has been characterized by female impersonation, male dan actors were viewed as irreplaceable by female actors.

In the twentieth century, the most well-known Peking opera male dan actors were Mei Lanfang, Cheng Yanqiu, Shang Xiaoyun, and Xun Huisheng, known as the "Four Greatest Dan Actors" (四大名旦; Sì Dàmíng Dàn). In Pingju, the "Four Greatest Dans" are Ai Lianjun, Bai Yushuang, Liu Cuixia, and Xi Cailian. There were also "Four Famous Small Dans" (四小名旦): Li Shifang, Mao Shilai, Zhang Junqiu, and Song Dezhu.

== Subtypes ==
There are a few different kinds of dan in Chinese opera. The commonly seen ones are 'Guimen Dan', 'Zheng Dan', 'Hua Dan', 'Daoma Dan', 'Wu Dan', 'Lao Dan' and 'Cai Dan'. Each different kind of dan has its own unique characteristics.

=== Guimen Dan ===
The Guimen Dan (闺门旦, "boudoir-door role") is the role of the virtuous lady. They are usually young and unmarried women that have high social status. Guimen Dan focus more on singing, with little movement. They sing in a very high-pitched and piercing voice. Opera schools in China have difficulty recruiting students for this kind of role, since it requires a good voice, good looks, and a good height. The most famous Guimen Dan of the last century was Mei Lanfang. Examples of Guimen roles are Du Liniang (杜丽娘) from The Peony Pavilion (牡丹亭) and Wang Baochuan (王宝钏) from Wujiapo (武家坡).

=== Zheng Dan ===
The Zheng Dan (正旦, "straight role"), also known as Qingyi (青衣, "verdant-clad") (Note: Qing (青) is a color without direct translation into English. It is a single color used to describe shades of green, blue (and some shades of black). The term predates the blue-green distinction in modern Standard Chinese and is now considered to be adjacent to cyan, although it is still used in noun phrases and as an intensifier. See Blue-green distinction in language.) is the role of middle-aged women with status, typically wives and mothers. The characters are mostly married and portrayed as dignified, virtuous, and elegant. Similar to Guimen Dan, Qingyi's performance is characterized by singing and speeches with a relatively small range of motion. They are also required to not show their teeth or move their dresses when they perform.

=== Wushan Dan ===
In Teochew opera, in addition to the qingyi role type shared with Peking opera and other Chinese operas, there is a unique subtype: a qingyi who wears a black or dark‑blue gown, known as "wushan" (烏衫). This term exists only in Teochew opera. In the Chaoshan dialect, "wu" means black, so the name carries a strong local flavour. Performers of the wushan role usually portray married middle‑aged women who live in hardship and endure great suffering, for example, Li Sanniang (李三娘) in Meeting by the Well (井邊會). Their performances emphasise sorrow, vocal skill, and acting technique.

While the standard qingyi typically represents dignified, virtuous women, the wushan in Teochew opera is characterised by a "tragic, emotional" style. Historically, the label has been almost synonymous with "women of bitter fate." As the Teochew saying goes, "When the wushan steps on stage, tears begin to fall (烏衫出棚目汁滴), highlighting how the tragic experiences and powerful performances of wushan characters move audiences to deep empathy and tears.

=== Hua Dan ===
A Hua Dan (花旦, "flowery role") is a lively, vivacious young female character. They normally wear short blouses with pants or skirts. Unlike the Guimen Dan, the Hua Dan focuses more on movements and speech. They must be able to speak quickly and clearly. They also need to project an image of cuteness and innocence as Hua Dan roles portray girls of around 12–16 years old. Often, a Guimen Dan is accompanied by a Hua Dan maid. Hongniang of the Romance of the Western Chamber and Yan Xijiao (阎惜姣) of Wulongyuan (乌龙院) are examples of Hua Dan roles.

=== Daoma Dan ===
A Daoma Dan (刀马旦, "sword-and-horse role") (Note: Dao is generically translated as "knife" but what is intended here is a dadao (sword). Chinese distinguishes its bladed weapons by form (single- or double-bladed) rather than by size (knife/sword).) is a young female warrior. This style of performance usually involves horseriding with a special saber called a dadao (大刀, "large knife"). This category is superficially similar to the Wu Dan but with less fighting, instead involving stunts and dancing with spears and other weapons. The Daoma Dan requires great stamina as the role requires singing while dancing or doing stunts. The Daoma Dan usually wears female warrior costumes with armor flags (kào qí, 靠旗) mounted on the back. Examples of Daoma Dan are Liang Hongyu and Mu Guiying. Daoma Dan is also the original Chinese title of the 1986 Hong Kong film Peking Opera Blues, directed by Tsui Hark.

=== Wu Dan ===
The Wu Dan (武旦, "martial role") specializes in fighting with all kinds of weapons. The Wu Dan engages in fighting with opponents in addition to doing stunts, typically on the ground as opposed to the horseback role of the Daoma Dan. In the past, the Wu Dan needed to perform cai qiao (踩跷, "on stilts") which the Daoma Dan did not do. Cai qiao, also known as the "false foot" technique pioneered by Wei Changsheng, is a very difficult skill requiring the actor to stand on their tiptoes for the entire show, assisted by special heeled shoes. In order to imitate the appearance and gait of bound feet, the heels of the shoe are so high that the actor is practically standing on tiptoe atop a small wooden false shoe. Wu Dan must also master many acrobatic movements. They specialize only in fighting hence they seldom sing or speak. Examples of Wu Dan are Zhizhujing (蜘蛛精) of Pansidong (盘丝洞) and Hu Sanniang.

=== Lao Dan ===
The Lao Dan (老旦, "old role") are older women. They have a set of movements, gestures, and singing styles distinct from the Guimen Dan. The Guimen roles sing in high-pitched and piercing voices while the Lao Dan sing at a lower pitch. Lao Dan costumes are also less vibrant compared to other female roles and they have much simpler hair styles. An example is Dowager She of Yang Men Nu Jiang (杨门女将).

=== Cai Dan ===
The Cai Dan (彩旦, "colorful role") is a clownish woman. Unlike other Dan roles, Cai Dan speak in normal voices and perform clownish gestures along with normal daily mannerisms. Clownish dans are now typically performed by men; hence they are physically unattractive with features exaggerated by hideous makeup.

=== Huashan ===
One of Mei Lanfang's most important contributions to Peking opera was the role of the huashan. Earlier actors such as Yu Ziyun and Wang Yaoqing (a teacher of Mei), had pioneered the role, but Mei developed and popularized it to a global audience, notably in his portrayal of Consort Yu of Farewell My Concubine. The Huashan is lively and flirtatious while remaining elegant and poised, combining the artistic features of the Hua Dan and Zheng Dan; occasionally it also includes a soldierly aspect that incorporates features from the Daoma Dan. Although the role was popular upon its debut, the composite nature of the visually alluring yet morally virtuous Huashan attracted criticism for erasing distinctions between role types and marking a moral decline in sexuality by the perceived elimination of "true" Zheng Dan roles. Modern scholars acknowledge that the Huashan role permits a more versatile and multifaceted portrayal of women in comparison to Confucian standards, but its paradoxical combination of sexuality and virtue has been critiqued as an unattainable standard for women.

== See also ==
- Chinese opera
- Chinese opera costume
- Guzhuang (costume)
- Theatre of China
