= Peking opera =

Chinese opera style

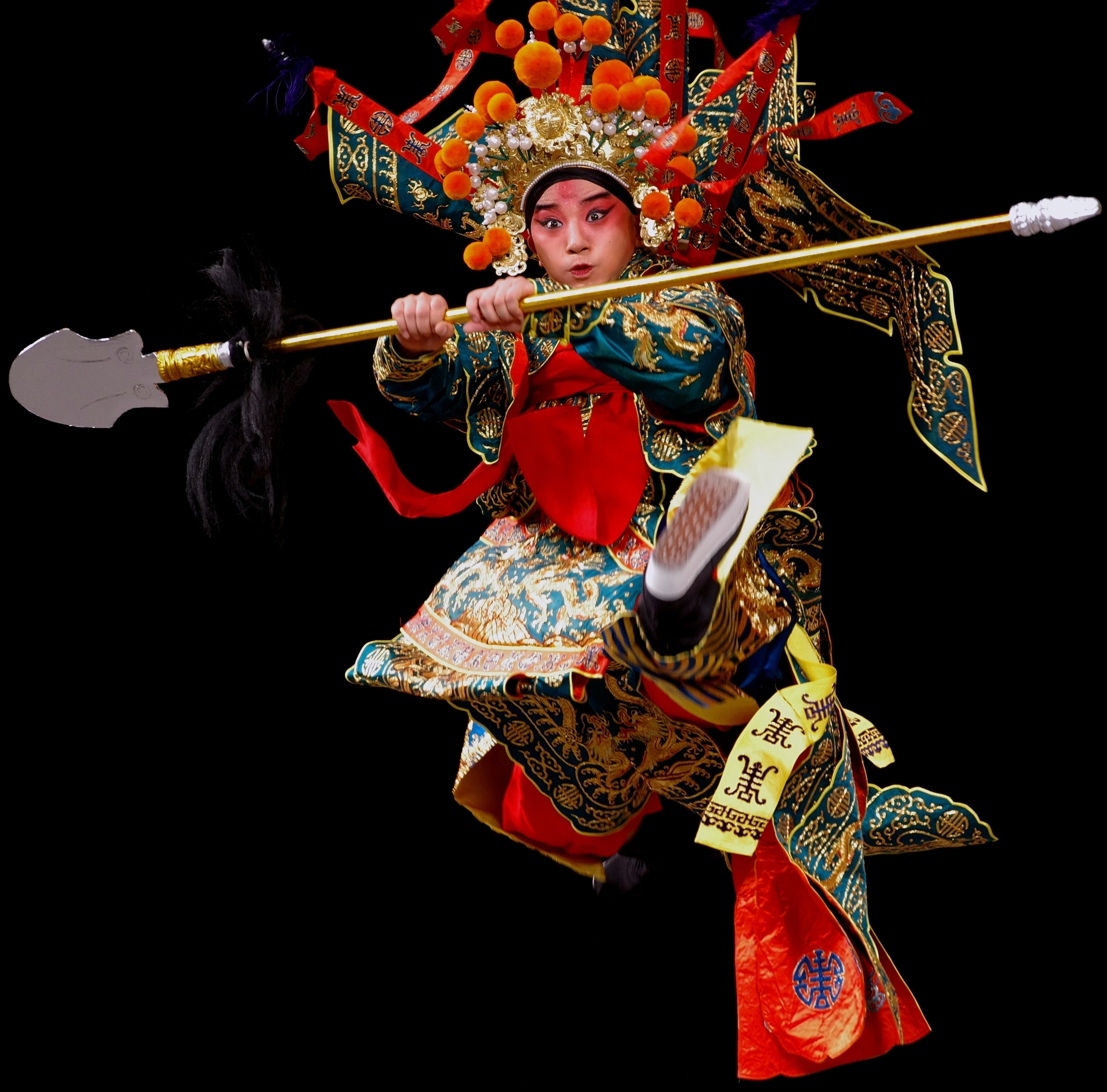
- Peking opera in Shanghai, 2014
- Native name: 京剧
- Etymology: From Peking, the postal romanization of Beijing
- Other names: Beijing opera, Pekingese opera, Jing opera, Jingju, Jingxi, Guoju
- Stylistic origins: Hui opera, Kunqu, Qinqiang, Han opera

Peking Opera
- UNESCO Intangible Cultural Heritage
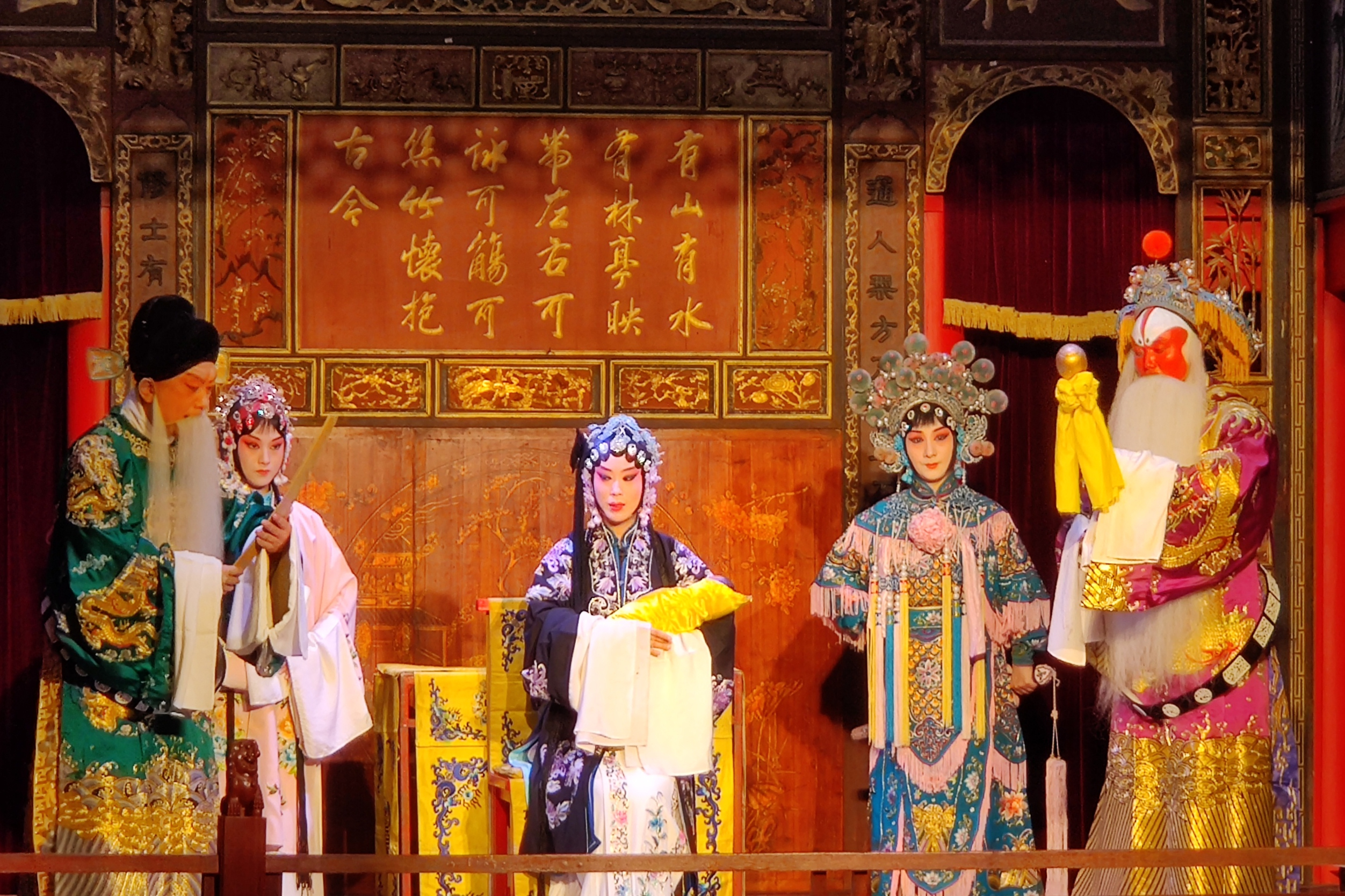
- Country: China
- Reference: 418
- Region: Asia and the Pacific

Inscription history
- Inscription: 2010 (5th session)
- List: Representative
- UNESCO Cultural Heritage

Peking opera
- "Peking Opera" in Simplified (top) and Traditional (bottom) Chinese characters
- Traditional Chinese: 京劇
- Simplified Chinese: 京剧
- Literal meaning: "capital drama"
Transcriptions
Standard Mandarin
- Hanyu Pinyin: Jīngjù
- Bopomofo: ㄐㄧㄥ ㄐㄩˋ
- Wade–Giles: Ching^{1}-chü^{4}
- Tongyong Pinyin: Jing-jyù
- IPA: [tɕíŋ.tɕŷ]
Yue: Cantonese
- Yale Romanization: Gīng-kehk
- Jyutping: ging1 kek6
- IPA: [kɪŋ˥ kʰɛk̚˨]
Southern Min
- Tâi-lô: Kiann-kio̍k

Alternative Chinese name
- Traditional Chinese: 京戲
- Simplified Chinese: 京戏
- Literal meaning: Capital play
Transcriptions
Standard Mandarin
- Hanyu Pinyin: Jīngxì
- Bopomofo: ㄐㄧㄥ ㄒㄧˋ
- Wade–Giles: Ching^{1}-hsi^{4}
- Tongyong Pinyin: Jing-sì
- IPA: [tɕíŋ.ɕî]

Second alternative Chinese name
- Traditional Chinese: 國劇
- Simplified Chinese: 国剧
- Literal meaning: National drama
Transcriptions
Standard Mandarin
- Hanyu Pinyin: Guójù
- Bopomofo: ㄍㄨㄛˊ ㄐㄩˋ
- Wade–Giles: Kuo^{2}-chü^{4}
- Tongyong Pinyin: Guó-jyù
- IPA: [kwǒ.tɕŷ]

Former name (mainly used 19th century)
- Traditional Chinese: 皮黃
- Simplified Chinese: 皮黄
Transcriptions
Standard Mandarin
- Hanyu Pinyin: Píhuáng
- Bopomofo: ㄆㄧˊ ㄏㄨㄤˊ
- Wade–Giles: P'i^{2}-huang^{2}
- Tongyong Pinyin: Pí-huáng
- IPA: [pʰǐ.xwǎŋ]

Former name (mainly used 1927–1949)
- Traditional Chinese: 平劇
- Simplified Chinese: 平剧
- Literal meaning: Beiping's drama
Transcriptions
Standard Mandarin
- Hanyu Pinyin: Píngjù
- Bopomofo: ㄆㄧㄥˊ ㄐㄩˋ
- Wade–Giles: P'ing^{2}-chü^{4}
- Tongyong Pinyin: Píng-jyù
- IPA: [pʰǐŋ.tɕŷ]

Peking opera, or Beijing opera, Jingju (simplified Chinese: 京剧; traditional Chinese: 京劇; pinyin: Jīngjù), is the dominant form of Chinese opera, which combines instrumental music, vocal performance, miming, martial arts, dance and acrobatics. It arose in Beijing in the mid-Qing dynasty (1644–1912) and became fully developed and recognized by the mid-19th century. The form was extremely popular in the Qing court and has come to be regarded as one of the cultural treasures of China. Major performance troupes are based in Beijing, Tianjin and Shanghai. The art form is also preserved in Taiwan, where it is also known as Guójù (Chinese: 國劇; lit. 'National opera'). It has also spread to other regions such as the United States and Japan.

Peking opera features four main role types: shēng (生; 'gentlemen'), dàn (旦; 'women'), jìng (淨/净; 'rough men'), and chǒu (丑; 'clowns'). Performing troupes often have several of each variety, as well as numerous secondary and tertiary performers. With their elaborate and colorful costumes, performers are the only focal points on Peking opera's characteristically sparse stage. They use the skills of speech, song, dance and combat in movements that are symbolic and suggestive, rather than realistic. Above all else, the skill of performers is evaluated according to the beauty of their movements. Performers also adhere to a variety of stylistic conventions that help audiences navigate the plot of the production. The layers of meaning within each movement must be expressed in time with music. The music of Peking opera can be divided into the xīpí (西皮) and èrhuáng (二黃/二黄) styles. Melodies include arias, fixed-tune melodies and percussion patterns. The repertoire of Peking opera includes over 1,400 works, which are based on Chinese history, folklore and, increasingly, contemporary life.

Traditional Peking opera was denounced as "feudalistic" and "bourgeois" during the Cultural Revolution (1966–1976) and replaced mostly with the revolutionary operas until the period's end. After the Cultural Revolution, these transformations were largely undone. In recent years, Peking opera has responded to sagging audience numbers by attempting reforms, including improving performance quality, adapting new performance elements, shortening works, and performing new and original plays.

== Etymology ==
"Peking opera" is the English term for the art form; the term entered the Oxford English Dictionary in 1953. "Beijing opera" is a more recent equivalent.

In China, the art form has been known by many names at different times and places. The earliest Chinese name, Píhuáng (皮黄), was a combination of the xipi and erhuang melodies. As it increased in popularity, its name became Jingju or Jingxi, which reflected its start in the capital city (Chinese: 京; pinyin: Jīng). From 1927 to 1949, when Beijing was known as Beiping (Chinese: 北平; pinyin: Běipíng), Peking opera was known as Pingxi or Pingju to reflect this change. Finally, with the establishment of the People's Republic of China in 1949, the name of the capital city was reverted to Beijing, and the formal name of this theatre in mainland China was established as Jingju. The Taiwanese name for this type of opera, Guoju, or "national opera", reflects disputes over the true seat of the Chinese government.

== History ==
=== Origins ===
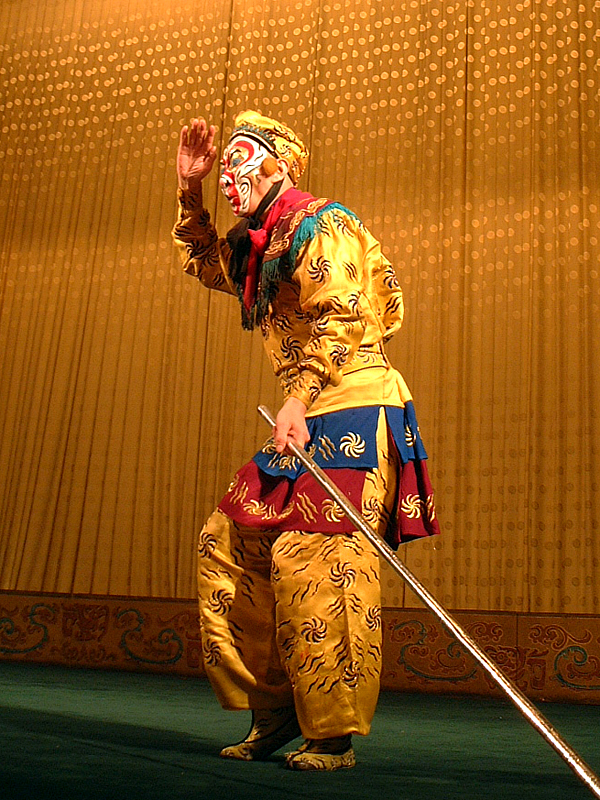
The character Sun Wukong at the Peking opera from Journey to the West

Peking opera was born when the Four Great Anhui Troupes brought Hui opera, or what is now called Huiju, in 1790 to Beijing, for the eightieth birthday of the Qianlong Emperor on 25 September. It was originally staged for the court and only made available to the public later. In 1828, several famous Hubei troupes arrived in Beijing and performed jointly with Anhui troupes. The combination gradually formed Peking opera's melodies. Peking opera is generally regarded as having fully formed by 1845. Although it is called Peking opera (Beijing theatre style), its origins are in the greater areas of the capital of Anhui province (the City of Anqing), including southern Anhui and eastern Hubei, which share the similar dialect of Xiajiang Mandarin (Lower Yangtze Mandarin). Peking opera's two main melodies, Xipi and Erhuang. Xipi literally means "skin puppet show", referring to the puppet show that originated in Shaanxi province. Chinese puppet shows always involve singing. Much dialogue is also carried out in an archaic form of Mandarin Chinese, in which the Zhongyuan Mandarin dialects of Henan and Shaanxi are closest. This form of Mandarin is recorded in the book Zhongyuan Yinyun. It also absorbed music from other operas and local Zhili musical art forms. Some scholars believe that the Xipi musical form was derived from the historic Qinqiang, while many conventions of staging, performance elements, and aesthetic principles were retained from Kunqu, the form that preceded it as court art.

Thus, Peking opera is not a monolithic form, but rather a coalescence of many older forms. However, the new form also creates its own innovations. The vocal requirements for all of the major roles were greatly reduced for Peking opera. The Chou, in particular, rarely has a singing part in Peking opera, unlike the equivalent role in Kunqu style. The melodies that accompany each play were also simplified, and are played with different traditional instruments than in earlier forms. Perhaps most noticeably, true acrobatic elements were introduced with Peking opera. The form grew in popularity throughout the 19th century. The Anhui troupes reached their peak of excellence in the middle of the century and were invited to perform in the court of the Taiping Heavenly Kingdom that had been established during the Taiping Rebellion. Beginning in 1884, the Empress Dowager Cixi became a regular patron of Peking opera, cementing its status over earlier forms like Kunqu. The popularity of Peking opera has been attributed to the simplicity of the form, with only a few voices and singing patterns. This allowed anyone to sing the arias themselves.

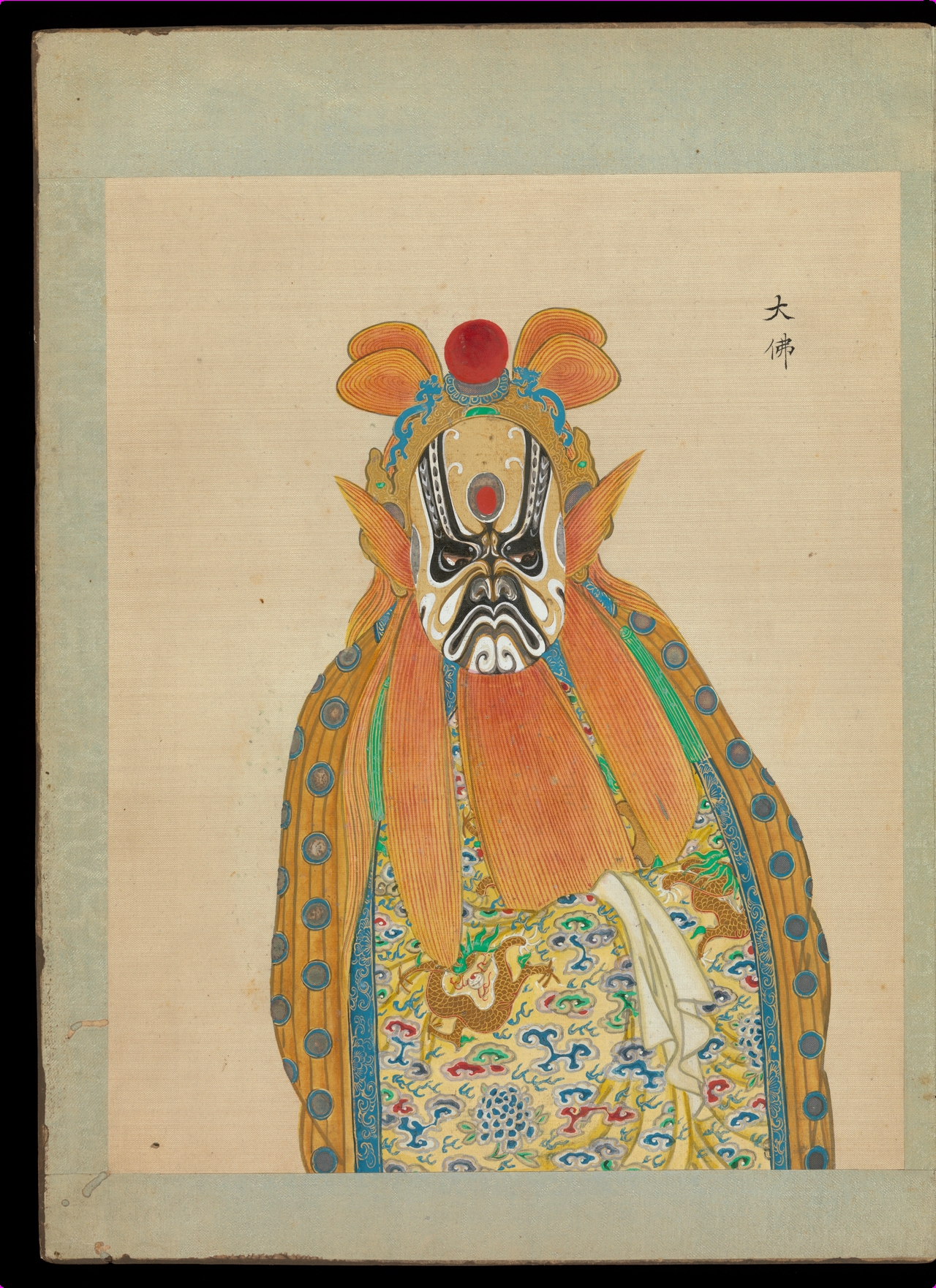
One of 100 portraits of Peking opera characters housed at the Metropolitan Museum of Art

At the time of its growth in the late nineteenth century, albums became used to display aspects of stage culture, including makeup and costumes of performers.

Peking opera was initially an exclusively male pursuit. There were bans on female performers and major limitations on female audience members, so the art form mainly catered to the tastes of male audience members. Qing dynasty emperors repeatedly banned female performers beginning with Kangxi Emperor in 1671. The last ban was by the Qianlong Emperor who banned all female performers in Beijing in 1772. The appearance of women on the stage began unofficially during the 1870s. Female performers began to impersonate male roles and declared equality with men. They were given a venue for their talents when Li Maoer, himself a former Peking-opera performer, founded the first female Peking-opera troupe in Shanghai. By 1894, the first commercial venue showcasing female performance troupes appeared in Shanghai. This encouraged other female troupes to form, which gradually increased in popularity. As a result, theatre artist Yu Zhenting petitioned for the lifting of the ban after the founding of the Republic of China in 1911. This was accepted, and the ban was lifted in 1912, although male Dan continued to be popular after this period.

=== Model "revolutionary opera" and Peking opera in Taiwan ===
After the Chinese Civil War, Peking opera became a focal point of identity for both involved parties. When the Chinese Communist Party came to power in mainland China in 1949, the newly formed government moved to bring art into line with Communist ideology, and "to make art and literature a component of the whole revolutionary machine". To this end, dramatic works without Communist themes were considered subversive, and were ultimately banned during the Cultural Revolution (1966–1976).

The use of opera as a tool to transmit communist ideology reached its climax in the Cultural Revolution, under the purview of Jiang Qing, wife of Mao Zedong. The "model operas" were considered one of the great achievements of the Cultural Revolution, and were meant to express Mao's view that "art must serve the interests of the workers, peasants, and soldiers and must conform to proletarian ideology."

Among the eight model plays eventually retained during that time were five Peking operas. Notable among these operas was The Legend of the Red Lantern, which was approved as a concert with piano accompaniment based on a suggestion from Jiang Qing. Performances of works beyond the eight model plays were allowed only in heavily modified form. The endings of many traditional plays were changed, and visible stage assistants in Peking opera were eliminated. After the end of the Cultural Revolution in the late 1970s, traditional Peking opera began to be performed again. Peking opera and other theatrical art forms were a controversial subject both before and during the Twelfth National People's Congress in 1982. A study carried in the People's Daily revealed that over 80 percent of musical dramas staged in the country were traditional plays from the pre-Communist era, as opposed to newly written historical dramas promoting socialist values. In response, Communist party officials enacted reforms to curb liberalism and foreign influence in theatrical works.

After the retreat of the Republic of China to Taiwan in 1949, Peking opera there took on a special status of "political symbolism", in which the Kuomintang government encouraged the art form over other forms of performance in an attempt to claim a position as the sole representative of Chinese culture. This often occurred at the expense of traditional Taiwanese opera. Due to its status as a prestigious art form with a long history, Peking opera has indeed been studied more and received more monetary support than other forms of theater in Taiwan. However, there has also been a competing movement towards advocating native opera to differentiate Taiwan from the mainland. In September 1990, when the Kuomintang government participated in a state-sponsored mainland cultural event for the first time, a Taiwanese opera group was sent, possibly to emphasize "Taiwaneseness".

=== Modern Peking opera ===
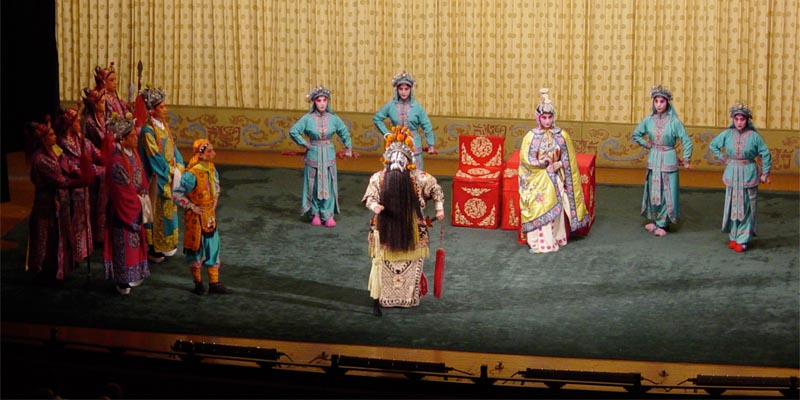
The Hegemon-King Bids His Concubine Farewell, a classic Peking opera. Consort Yu (seated) deeply loved the King Xiang Yu (center stage); upon his defeat in battle, she committed suicide for him.

During the second half of the 20th century, Peking opera witnessed a steady decline in audience numbers. This has been attributed both to a decrease in performance quality and an inability of the traditional opera form to capture modern life. Furthermore, the archaic language of Peking opera required productions to use electronic subtitles, which hampered the development of the form. The influence of Western culture has also left the younger generations impatient with the slow pacing of Peking opera. In response, Peking opera began to see reform starting in the 1980s. Such reforms have taken the form of creating a school of performance theory to increase performance quality, employing modern elements to attract new audiences, and performing new plays outside of the traditional canon. However, these reforms have been hampered by both a lack of funding and an adverse political climate that makes the performance of new plays difficult.

In addition to more formal reform measures, Peking-opera troupes during the 1980s also adopted more unofficial changes. Some of those seen in traditional works have been called "technique for technique's sake". This has included the use of extended high pitch sequences by female Dan, and the addition of lengthier movement sections and percussion sequences to traditional works. Such changes have generally met with disdain from Peking-opera performers, who see them as ploys to gain immediate audience appeal. Plays with repetitive sequences have also been shortened to hold audience interest. New works have naturally experienced a greater freedom to experiment. Regional, popular, and foreign techniques have been adopted, including Western-style makeup and beards and new face paint designs for Jing characters. The spirit of reform continued during the 1990s. To survive in an increasingly open market, troupes like the Shanghai Peking Opera Company needed to bring traditional Peking opera to new audiences. To do this, they have offered an increasing number of free performances in public areas.

There has also been a general feeling of a shift in the creative attribution of Peking-opera works. The performer has traditionally played a large role in the scripting and staging of Peking-opera works. However, perhaps following the lead of the West, Peking opera in recent decades has shifted to a more director and playwright-centered model. Performers have striven to introduce innovation in their work while heeding the call for reform from this new upper level of Peking-opera producers.

Channel CCTV-11 in mainland China is currently dedicated to broadcasting classic Chinese opera productions, including Peking opera.

=== Peking opera around the world ===
In addition to its presence in mainland China, Peking opera has spread to many other places. It can be found in Hong Kong, Taiwan, and overseas Chinese communities elsewhere.

Mei Lanfang, one of the most famous Dan performers of all time, was also one of the greatest popularizers of Peking opera abroad. During the 1920s, he performed Peking opera in Japan. This inspired an American tour in February 1930. Although some, such as the actor Otis Skinner, believed that Peking opera could never be a success in the United States, the favorable reception of Mei and his troupe in New York City disproved this notion. The performances had to be relocated from the 49th Street Theater to the larger National Theater, and the duration of the tour extended from two weeks to five. Mei traveled across the United States, receiving honorary degrees from the University of California and Pomona College. He followed this tour with a tour in the Soviet Union in 1935.

The theatre department at the University of Hawaiʻi at Mānoa has been home to English-language Jingju for more than twenty-five years. The school offers Asian Theatre as a focus area in its Theatre and Performance Studies program and has regular Jingju performances, the most recent being Lady Mu and the Yang Family Generals in 2014.

== Performers and roles ==
=== Sheng ===
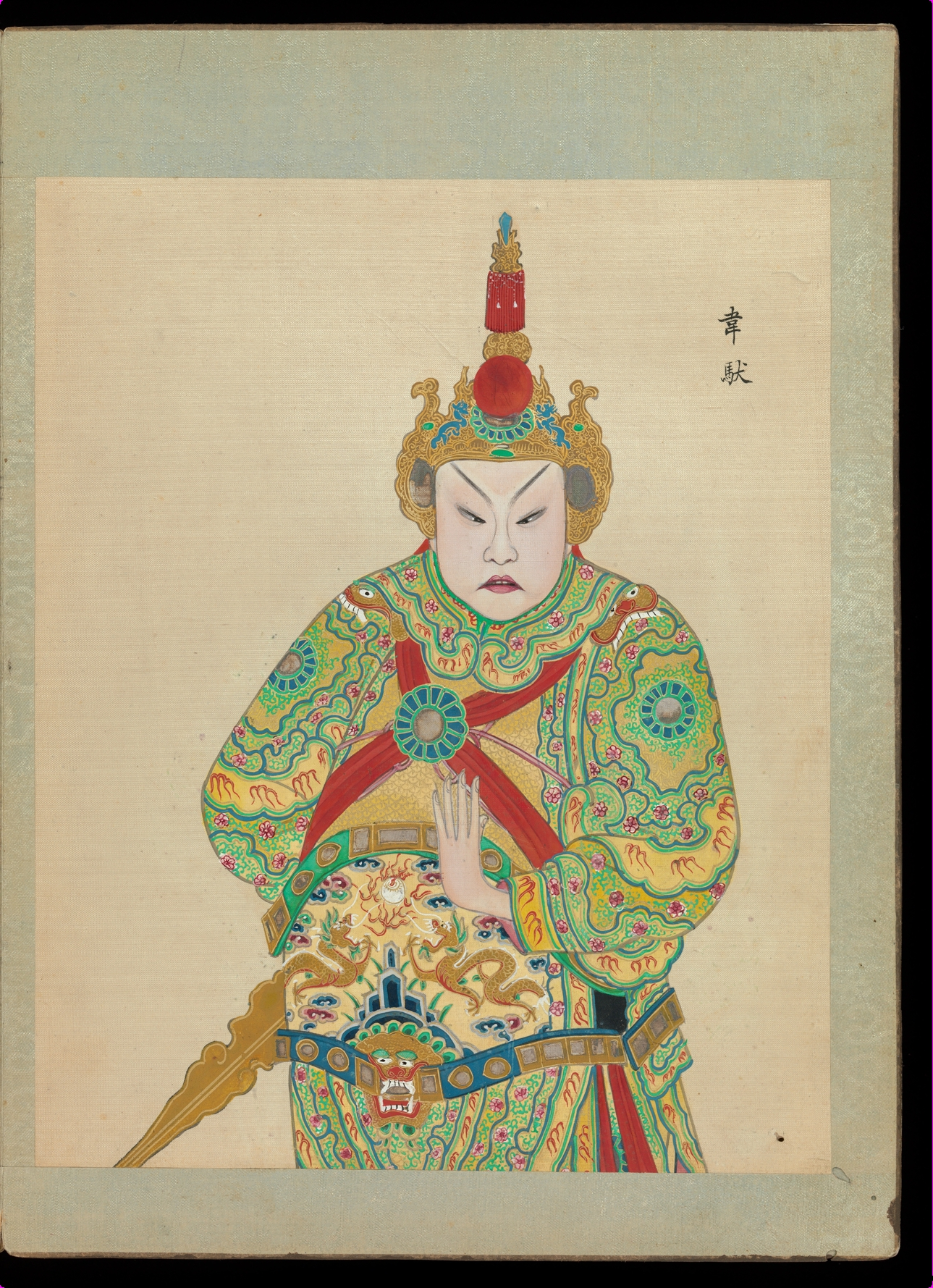
A Sheng role

The Sheng (生) is the main male role in Beijing opera. This role has numerous subtypes. The laosheng is a dignified older role. These characters have a gentle and cultivated disposition and wear sensible costumes. One type of laosheng role is the hongsheng, a red-faced older male. The only two hongsheng roles are Guan Gong, the Chinese God of War, and Zhao Kuang-yin, the first Song dynasty emperor. Young male characters are known as xiaosheng. These characters sing in a high, shrill voice with occasional breaks to represent the voice changing period of adolescence. Depending on the character's rank in society, the costume of the xiaosheng may be either elaborate or simple. Off-stage, xiaosheng actors are often involved with beautiful women by virtue of the handsome and young image they project. The wusheng is a martial character for roles involving combat. They are highly trained in acrobatics, and have a natural voice when singing. Troupes will always have a laosheng actor. A xiaosheng actor may also be added to play roles fitting to his age. In addition to these main Sheng, the troupe will also have a secondary laosheng.

=== Dan ===
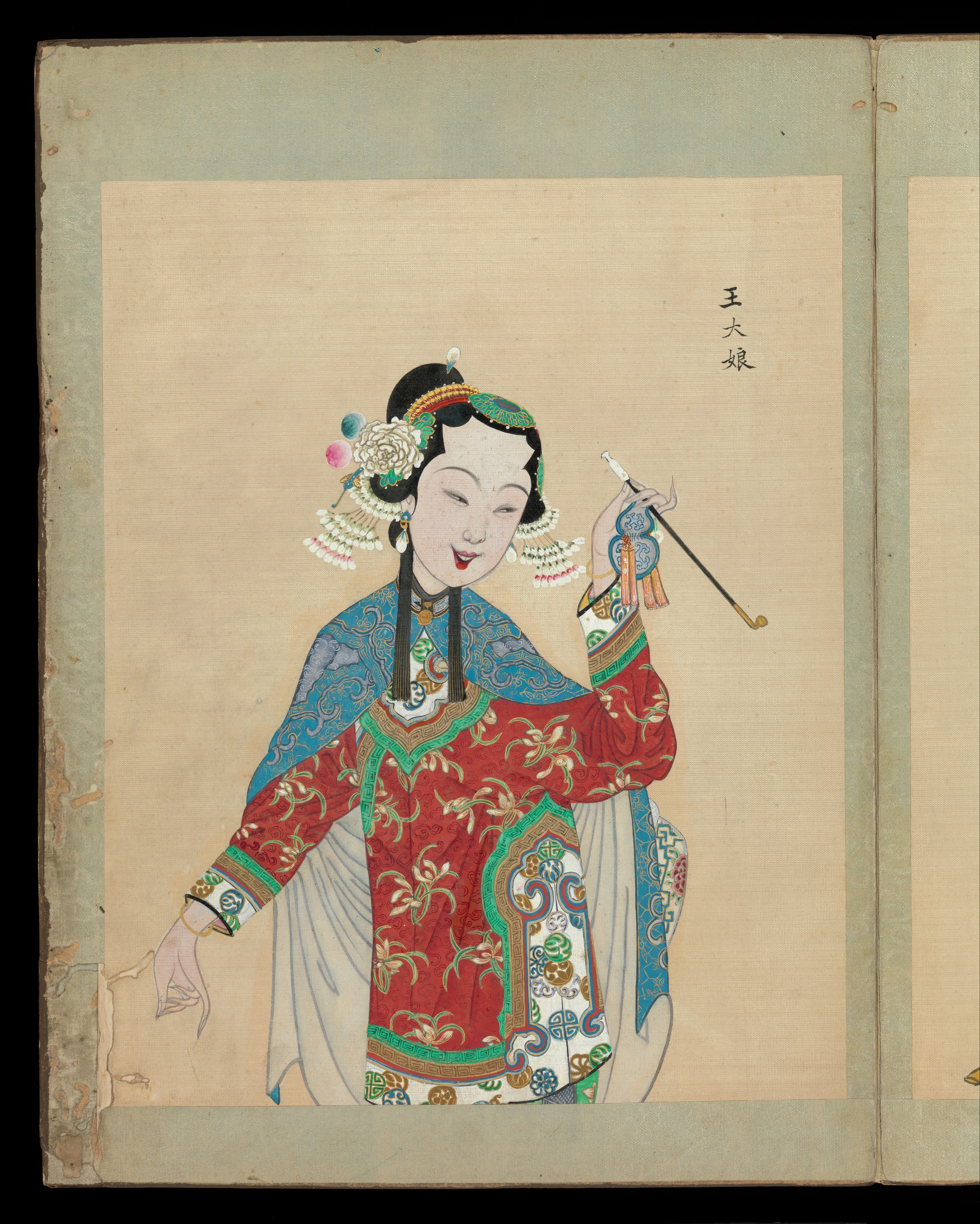
A Dan role

The Dan (旦) refers to any female role in Beijing opera. Dan roles were originally divided into five subtypes. Old women were played by laodan, martial women were wudan, young female warriors were daomadan, virtuous and elite women were qingyi, and vivacious and unmarried women were huadan. One of Mei Lanfang's most important contributions to Beijing opera was in pioneering a sixth type of role, the huashan. This role type combines the status of the qingyi with the sensuality of the huadan. A troupe will have a young Dan to play main roles, as well as an older Dan for secondary parts. Four examples of famous Dans are Mei Lanfang, Cheng Yanqiu, Shang Xiaoyun, and Xun Huisheng. In the early years of Beijing opera, all Dan roles were played by men. Wei Changsheng, a male Dan performer in the Qing court, developed the cai ciao, or "false foot" technique, to simulate the bound feet of women and the characteristic gait that resulted from the practice. The ban on female performers also led to a controversial form of brothel, known as the xianggong tangzi, in which men paid to have sex with young boys dressed as females. The performing skills taught to the youths employed in these brothels led many of them to become professional Dan later in life.

=== Jing ===
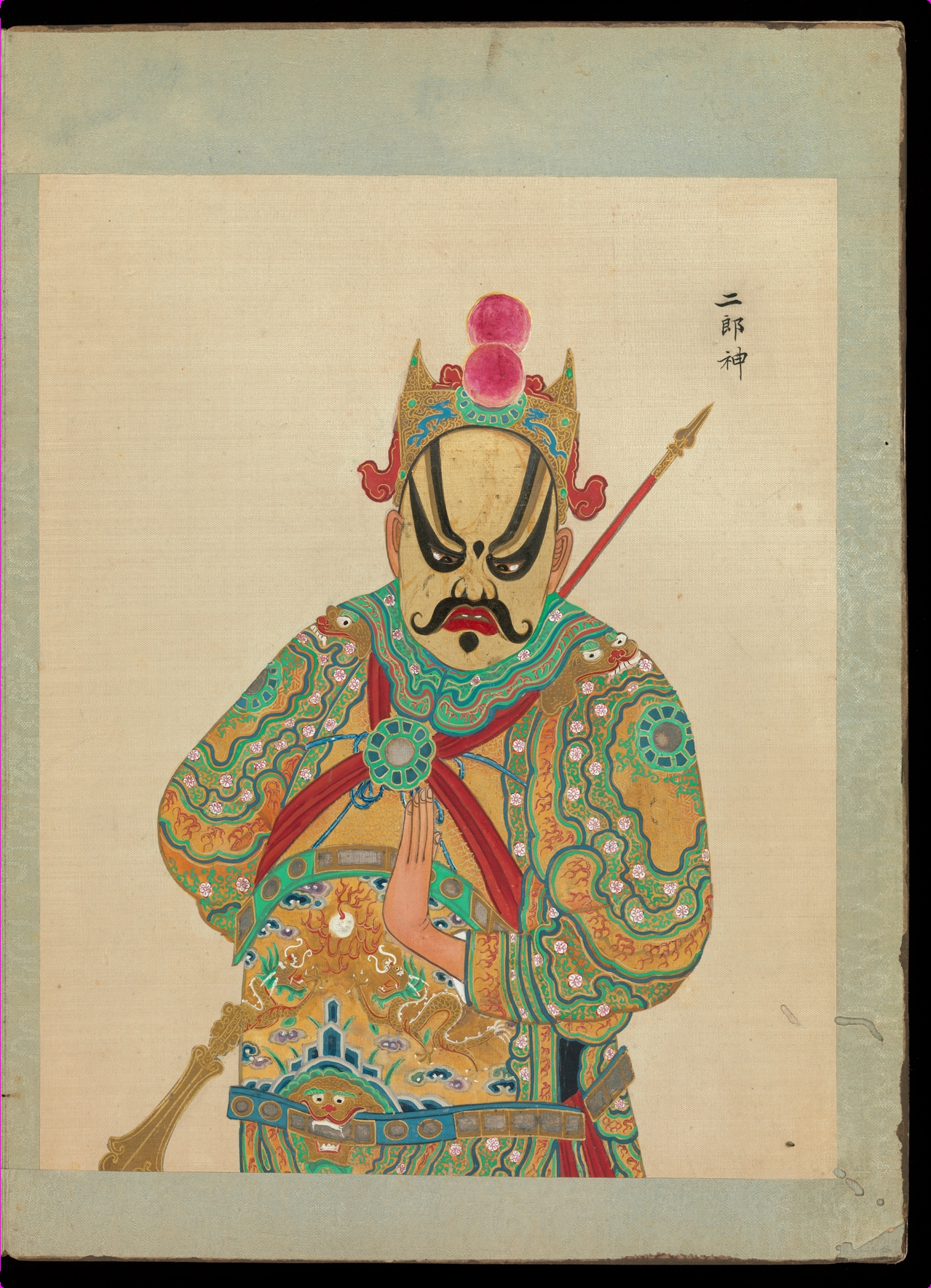
A Jing role

The Jing (净) is a painted face male role. Depending on the repertoire of the particular troupe, he will play either primary or secondary roles. This type of role will entail a forceful character, so a Jing must have a strong voice and be able to exaggerate gestures. Beijing opera boasts 16 basic facial patterns, but there are over 100 specific variations. The patterns and coloring are thought to be derived from traditional Chinese color symbolism and divination on the lines of a person's face, which is said to reveal personality. Easily recognizable examples of coloring include red, which denotes uprightness and loyalty, white, which represents evil or crafty characters, and black, which is given to characters of soundness and integrity. Three main types of Jing roles are often seen. These include dongchui, a loyal general with a black face who excels in singing, jiazi, a complex character played by a skilled actor, and wujing, a martial and acrobatic character.

=== Chou ===
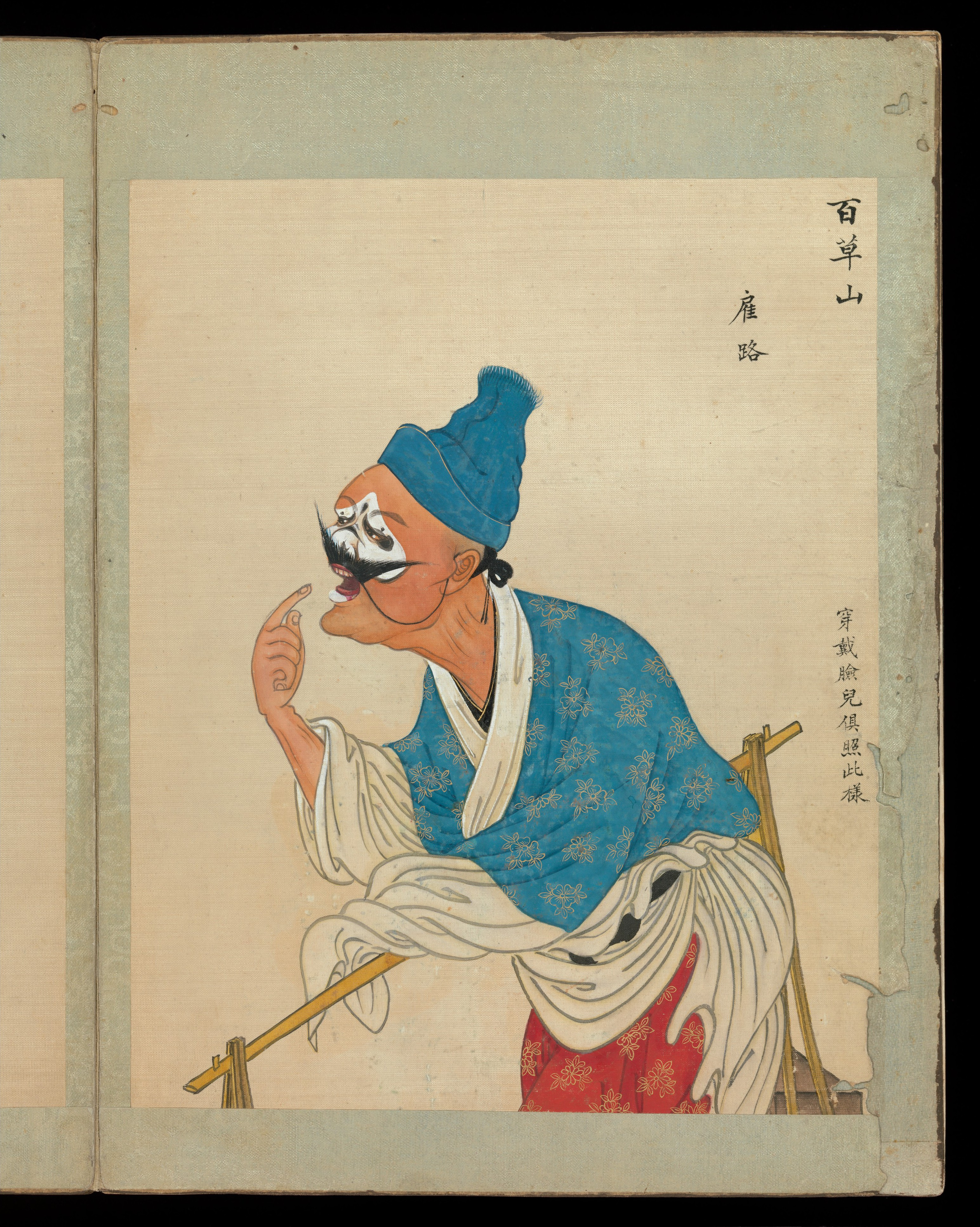
A Chou role

The Chou (丑) is a male clown role. The Chou usually plays secondary roles in a troupe. Indeed, most studies of Beijing opera classify the Chou as a minor role. The name of the role is a homophone of the Mandarin Chinese word chou, meaning "ugly". This reflects the traditional belief that the clown's combination of ugliness and laughter could drive away evil spirits. Chou roles can be divided into Wen Chou, civilian roles such as merchants and jailers, and Wu Chou, minor military roles. The Wu Chou combines comic acting and acrobatics. Chou characters are generally amusing and likable, if a bit foolish. Their costumes range from simple for characters of lower status to elaborate, perhaps overly so, for high-status characters. Chou characters wear special face paint, called xiaohualian, that differs from that of Jing characters. The defining characteristic of this type of face paint is a small patch of white chalk around the nose. This can represent either a mean and secretive nature or a quick wit.

Beneath the whimsical persona of the Chou, a serious connection to the form of Beijing opera exists. The Chou is the character most connected to the guban, the drums and clapper commonly used for musical accompaniment during performances. The Chou actor often uses the guban in solo performance, especially when performing Shu Ban, light-hearted verses spoken for comedic effect. The clown is also connected to the small gong and cymbals, percussion instruments that symbolize the lower classes and the raucous atmosphere inspired by the role. Although Chou characters do not sing frequently, their arias feature large amounts of improvisation. This is considered a license of the role, and the orchestra will accompany the Chou actor even as he bursts into an unscripted folk song. However, due to the standardization of Beijing opera and political pressure from government authorities, Chou improvisation has lessened in recent years. The Chou has a vocal timbre that is distinct from other characters, as the character will often speak in the common Beijing dialect, as opposed to the more formal dialects of other characters.

== Training ==
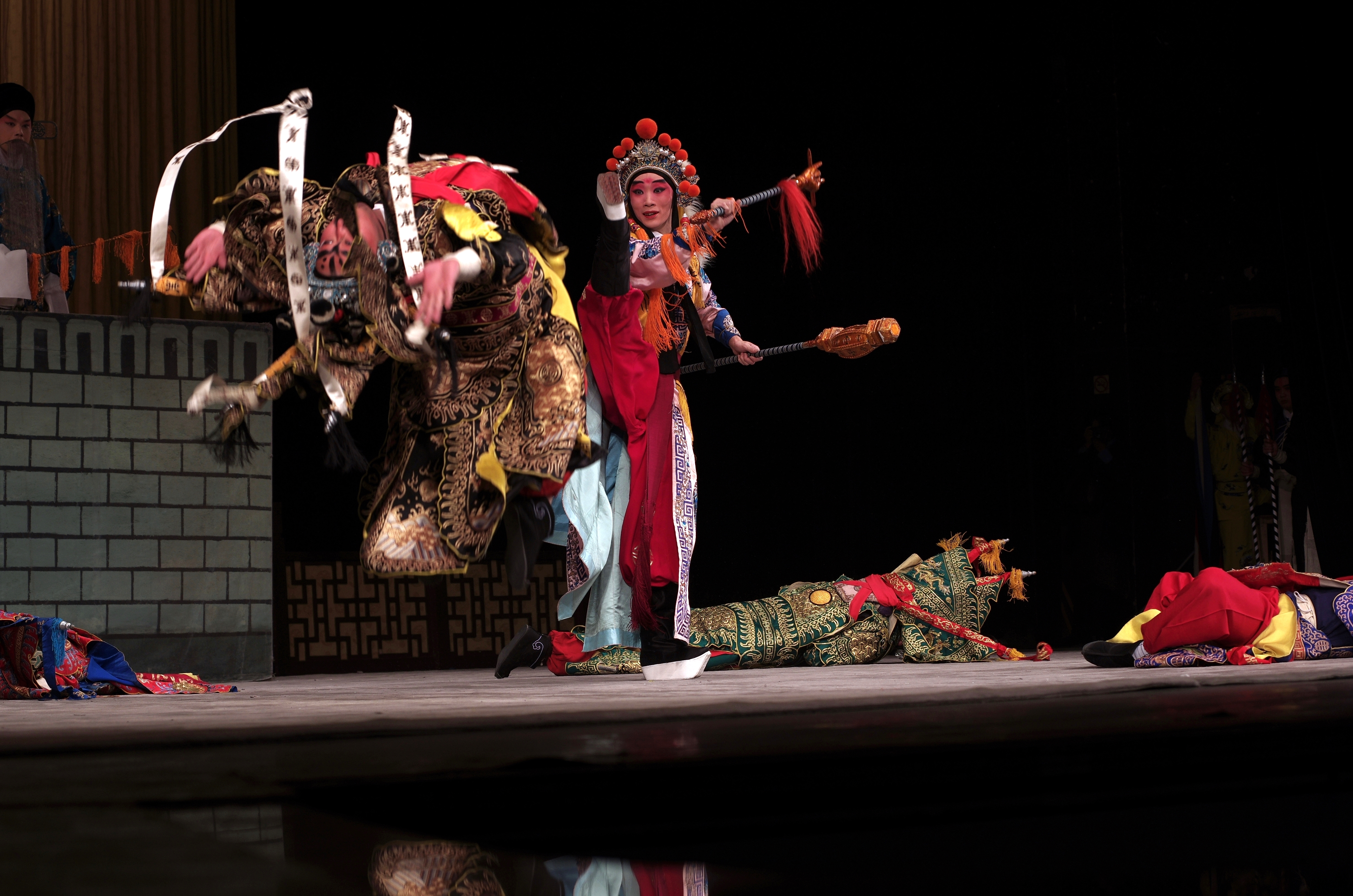
An actor doing a backflip to show that his character is destroyed in battle by the hero Li Cunxiao.

Becoming a Peking opera performer takes a long and difficult apprenticeship starting at an early age. Before the 20th century, students were often picked personally at a young age by a teacher and trained for seven years on account of the contract from the child's parents. Since the teacher fully provided for the student during this period, the student accrued a debt to his master that was later repaid through performance earnings. After 1911, training took place in more formally organized schools. Students at these schools rose as early as five o'clock in the morning for exercise. Daytime was spent learning the skills of acting and combat, and senior students performed in outside theaters in the evening. The entire group was beaten with bamboo canes if they made any mistakes during such performances. Schools with less harsh training methods began appearing in 1930, but all schools were closed in 1931 after the Japanese invasion. New schools were not opened until 1952.

Performers are first trained in acrobatics, followed by singing and gestures. Several performing schools, all based on the styles of famous performers, are taught. Some examples are the Mei Lanfang school, the Cheng Yanqiu school, the Ma Lianliang school, and the Qi Lintong school. Students previously trained exclusively in the art of performance, but modern performance schools now include academic studies as well. Teachers assess the qualifications of each student and assign them roles as primary, secondary, or tertiary characters accordingly. Students with little acting talent often become Peking opera musicians. They may also serve as the supporting cast of foot soldiers, attendants, and servants that is present in every Peking-opera troupe. In Taiwan, the Ministry of National Defense of the Republic of China runs a national Peking-opera training school.

== Visual performance elements ==
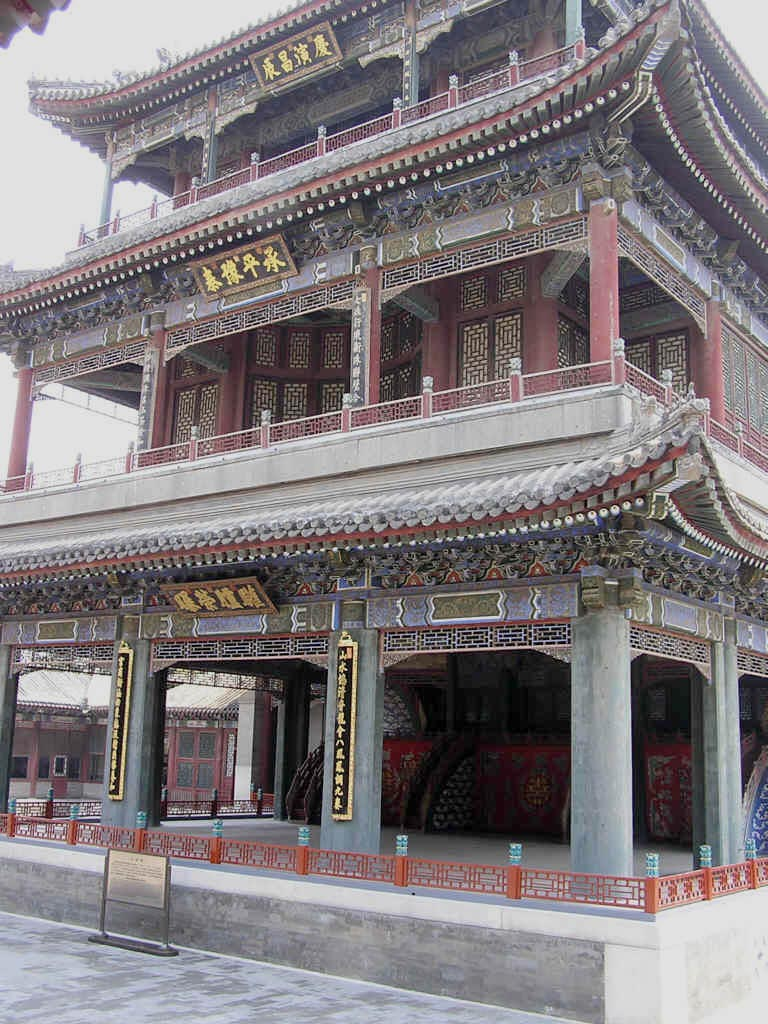
A traditional Peking-opera stage at the Summer Palace in Beijing

Peking-opera performers use four main skills. The first two are song and speech. The third is dance-acting. This includes pure dance, pantomime, and all other types of dance. The final skill is combat, which includes both acrobatics and fighting with all manner of weaponry. All of these skills are expected to be performed effortlessly, in keeping with the spirit of the art form.

=== Aesthetic aims and principles of movement ===
Peking opera follows other traditional Chinese arts in emphasizing meaning, rather than accuracy. The highest aim of performers is to put beauty into every motion. Indeed, performers are strictly criticized for lacking beauty during training. Additionally, performers are taught to create a synthesis between the different aspects of Peking opera. The four skills of Peking opera are not separate, but rather should be combined in a single performance. One skill may take precedence at certain moments during a play, but this does not mean that other actions should cease. Much attention is paid to tradition in the art form, and gestures, settings, music, and character types are determined by long-held convention. This includes conventions of movement, which are used to signal particular actions to the audience. For example, walking in a large circle always symbolizes traveling a long distance, and a character straightening their costume and headdress symbolizes that an important character is about to speak. Some conventions, such as the pantomimic opening and closing of doors and mounting and descending of stairs, are more readily apparent.

Many performances deal with behaviors that occur in daily life. However, in accordance with the overriding principle of beauty, such behaviors are stylized to be presented on stage. Peking opera does not aim to accurately represent reality. Experts of the art form contrast the principles of Peking opera with the principle of Mo, mimes or imitation, that is found in western dramas. Peking opera should be suggestive, not imitative. The literal aspects of scenes are removed or stylized to better represent intangible emotions and characters. The most common stylization method in Peking opera is roundness. Every motion and pose is carefully manipulated to avoid sharp angles and straight lines. A character looking upon an object above them will sweep their eyes in a circular motion from low to high before landing on the object. Similarly, a character will sweep their hand in an arc from left to right in order to indicate an object on the right. This avoidance of sharp angles extends to three-dimensional movement as well; reversals of orientation often take the form of a smooth, S-shaped curve. All of these general principles of aesthetics are present within other performance elements as well.

=== Staging and costumes ===
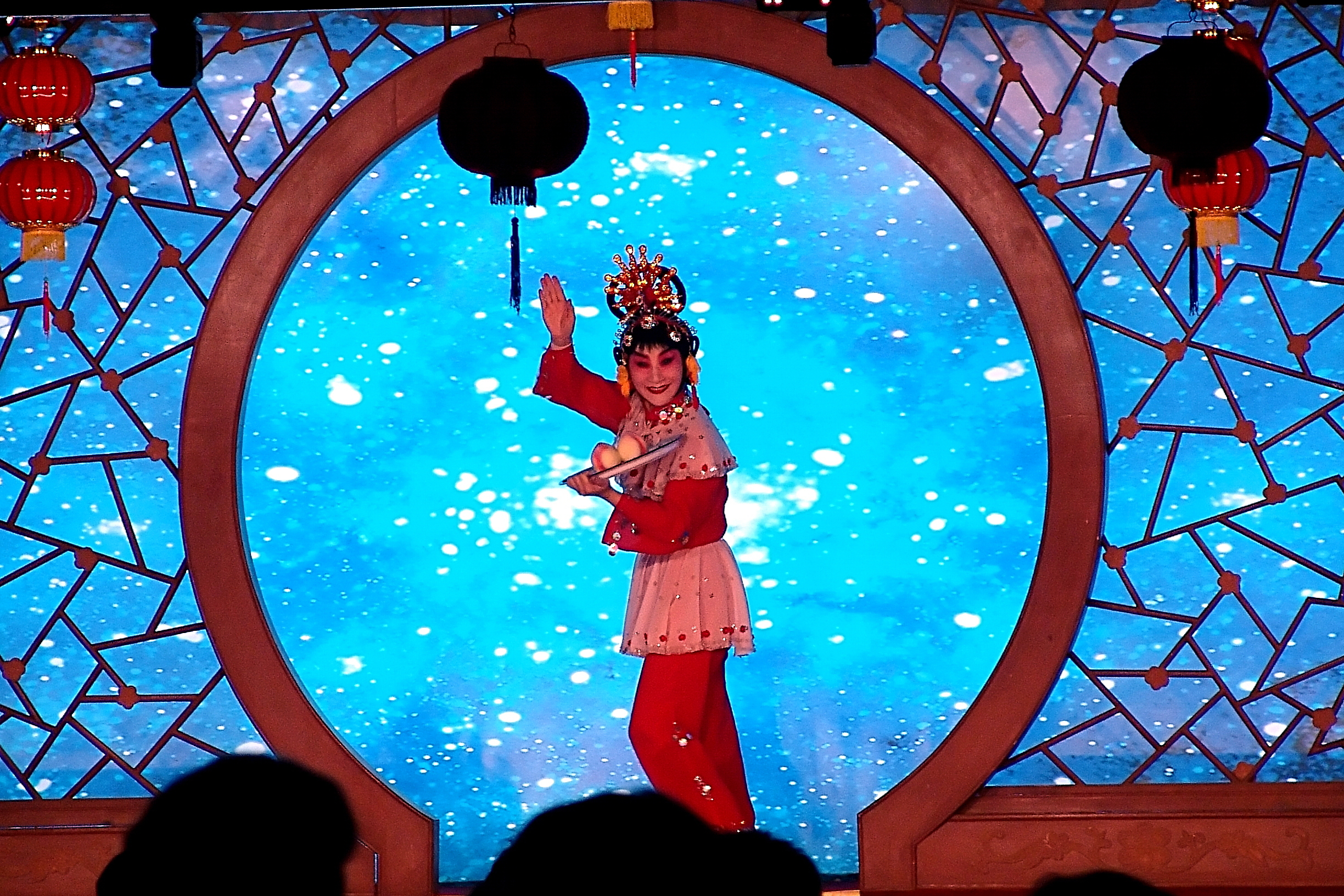
A scene from Peking opera

Peking opera stages have traditionally been square platforms. The action on stage is usually visible from at least three sides. The stage is divided into two parts by an embroidered curtain called a shoujiu. Musicians are visible to the audience on the front part of the stage. Traditional Peking opera stages were built above the line of sight of the viewers, but some modern stages have been constructed with higher audience seating. Viewers are always seated south of the stage. Therefore, north is the most important direction in Peking opera, and performers will immediately move to "center north" upon entering the stage. All characters enter from the east and exit from the west. In line with the highly symbolic nature of Peking opera, the form uses very few props. This reflects seven centuries of Chinese performance tradition. The presence of large objects is frequently indicated through conventions. The stage will almost always have a table and at least one chair, which can be turned through convention into such diverse objects as a city wall, a mountain, or a bed. Peripheral objects will often be used to signify the presence of a larger, main object. For example, a whip is used to indicate a horse and an oar symbolizes a boat.

The length and internal structure of Peking-opera plays is highly variable. Prior to 1949, zhezixi, short plays or plays made up of short scenes from longer plays, were often performed. These plays usually center on one simple situation or feature a selection of scenes designed to include all four of the main Peking opera skills and showcase the virtuosity of the performers. This format has become less prevalent in recent times, but plays of one act are still performed. These short works, as well as individual scenes within longer works, are marked by an emotional progression from the beginning of the play to the end. For example, the concubine in the one act play The Favorite Concubine Becomes Intoxicated begins in a state of joy, and then moves to anger and jealousy, drunken playfulness, and finally to a feeling of defeat and resignation. A full-length play usually has from six to fifteen or more scenes. The overall story in these longer works is told through contrasting scenes. Plays will alternate between civil and martial scenes, or scenes that involve protagonists and antagonists. There are several major scenes within the work that follow the pattern of emotional progression. It is these scenes that are usually excerpted for later zhezixi productions. Some of the most complex plays may even have an emotional progression from scene to scene.

Due to the scarcity of props in Peking opera, costumes take on added importance. Costumes function first to distinguish the rank of the character being played. Emperors and their families wear yellow robes, and high-ranking officials wear purple. The robe worn by these two classes is called a mang, or python robe. It is a costume suitable for the high rank of the character, featuring brilliant colors and rich embroidery, often in the design of a dragon. Persons of high rank or virtue wear red, lower-ranking officials wear blue, young characters wear white, the old wear white, brown, or olive, and all other men wear black. On formal occasions, lower officials may wear the kuan yi, a simple gown with patches of embroidery on both the front and back. All other characters, and officials on informal occasions, wear the chezi, a basic gown with varying levels of embroidery and no jade girdle to denote rank. All three types of gowns have water sleeves, long flowing sleeves that can be flicked and waved like water, attached to facilitate emotive gestures. Tertiary characters of no rank wear simple clothing without embroidery. Hats are intended to blend in with the rest of the costume and will usually have a matching level of embroidery. Shoes may be high or low-soled, the former being worn by characters of high rank, and the latter by characters of low rank or acrobatic characters.

Moreover, Jingju stage costumes reflect profound socio-political meanings, allowing them to serve as expressive tools for Jingju performers and their audiences.

=== Stage properties (Qimo) ===
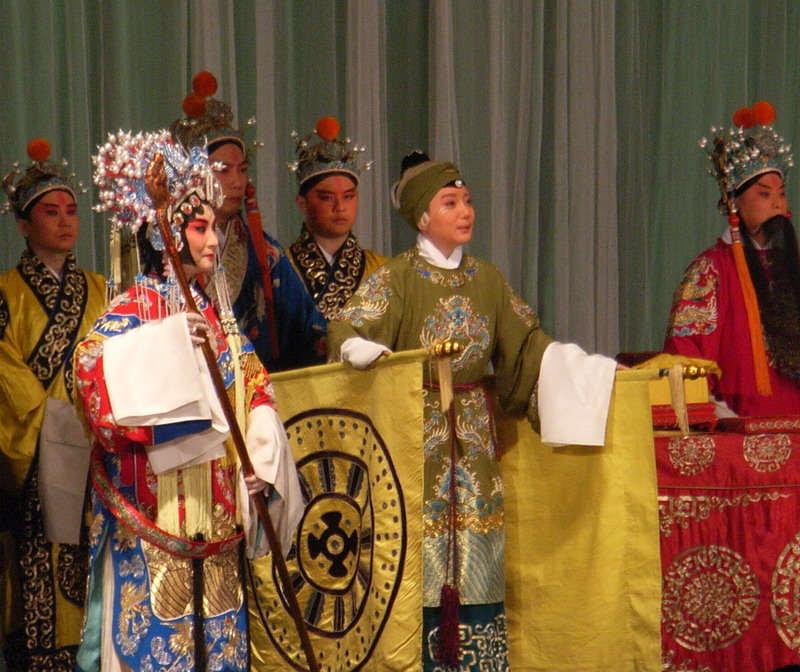
An actor can act out the scene of galloping the horse simply by using a horsewhip without riding a real horse on stage.

Qimo (stage props) is the name for all stage properties and some simple decorations. The term first occurred in the Jin dynasty (266–420). Qimo includes articles of everyday life such as candlesticks, lanterns, fans, handkerchiefs, brushes, paper, ink and ink slabs, and tea and wine sets. The props also include: sedan chairs, vehicle flags, oars, and horsewhips, as well as weapons. Also employed are various articles to demonstrate environments, such as cloth backdrops to represent cities, and curtains, flags, table curtains, and chair covers. Traditional qimo are not just imitations of real articles, but also artistic articles in their own right. Flags are also frequently used on the stage. A square flag with the Chinese character for "marshal" on it, a rectangular flag with the Chinese character for "commander" on it, and a flag with the name of a certain army on it represent the location of army camps and commanders-in-chief. In addition, there are water, fire, wind, and vehicle flags. Actors shake these flags to represent waves, fire, wind, or moving vehicles.

== Aural performance elements ==
=== Vocal production ===
Vocal production in Peking opera is conceived of as being composed of "four levels of song": songs with music, verse recitation, prose dialogue, and non-verbal vocalizations. The conception of a sliding scale of vocalization creates a sense of smooth continuity between songs and speech. The three basic categories of vocal production technique are the use of breath (yongqi), pronunciation (fayin), and special Peking-opera pronunciation (shangkouzi).

In Chinese opera, breath is based in the pubic region and supported by the abdominal muscles. Performers follow the basic principle that "strong centralized breath moves the melodic-passages" (zhong qi xing xiang). Breath is visualized as being drawn up through a central breathing cavity extending from the pubic region to the top of the head. This "cavity" must be under performers' control at all times, and they develop special techniques to control both entering and exiting air. The two major methods of taking in breath are known as "exchanging breath" (huan qi) and "stealing breath" (tou qi). "Exchanging breath" is a slow, unhurried process of breathing out old air and taking in new. It is used at moments when the performer is not under time constraint, such as during a purely instrumental musical passage or when another character is speaking. "Stealing breath" is a sharp intake of air without prior exhalation, and is used during long passages of prose or song when a pause would be undesirable. Both techniques should be invisible to the audience and take in only the precise amount of air required for the intended vocalization. The most important principle in exhalation is "saving the breath" (cun qi). Breath should not be expended all at once at the beginning of a spoken or sung passage, but rather expelled slowly and evenly over its length. Most songs and some prose contain precise written intervals for when breath should be "exchanged" or "stolen". These intervals are often marked by carats.

Pronunciation is conceptualized as shaping the throat and mouth into the shape necessary to produce the desired vowel sound, and clearly articulating the initial consonant. There are four basic shapes for the throat and mouth, corresponding to four vowel types, and five methods of articulating consonants, one for each type of consonant. The four throat and mouth shapes are "opened-mouth" (kaikou), "level-teeth" (qichi), "closed-mouth" (hekou or huokou), and "scooped-lips" (cuochun). The five consonant types are denoted by the portion of the mouth most critical to each type's production: throat, or larynx (hou); tongue (she); molars, or the jaws and palate (chi); front teeth (ya); and lips (chun).

Some syllables (written Chinese characters) have special pronunciations in Peking opera. This is due to the collaboration with regional forms and kunqu that occurred during the development of Peking opera. For example, 你, meaning "you", may be pronounced li, as it is in the Anhui dialect, rather than the Standard Chinese ni. 我, meaning "I" and pronounced wo in Standard Chinese, becomes ngo, as it is pronounced in the dialect of Suzhou. In addition to pronunciation differences that are due to the influence of regional forms, the readings of some characters have been changed to promote ease of performance or vocal variety. For example, zhi, chi, shi, and ri sounds do not carry well and are difficult to sustain, because they are produced far back in the mouth. Therefore, they are performed with an additional i sound, as in zhii.

These techniques and conventions of vocal production are used to create the two main categories of vocalizations in Peking opera: stage speech and song.

=== Stage speech ===
Peking opera is performed using both Classical Chinese and Modern Standard Chinese with some slang terms added for color. The social position of the character being played determines the type of language that is used. Peking opera features three major types of stage speech (nianbai, 念白). Monologues and dialogue, which make up the majority of most plays, consist of prose speeches. The purpose of prose speech is to advance the plot of the play or inject humor into a scene. They are usually short, and are performed mostly using vernacular language. However, as Elizabeth Wichmann points out, they also have rhythmic and musical elements, achieved through the "stylized articulation of monosyllabic sound units" and the "stylized pronunciation of speech-tones", respectively. Prose speeches were frequently improvised during the early period of Peking opera's development, and chou performers carry on that tradition today.

The second main type of stage speech consists of quotations drawn from classical Chinese poetry. This type is rarely used in Peking opera; plays have one or two such quotations at most, and often none at all. In most instances, the use of classical poetry is intended to heighten the impact of a scene. However, Chou and more whimsical Dan characters may misquote or misinterpret the classical lines, creating a comical effect.

The final category of stage speech is conventionalized stage speeches (chengshi nianbai). These are rigid formulations that mark important transition points. When a character enters for the first time, an entrance speech (shangchang) or self-introduction speech (zi bao jiamen) is given, which includes a prelude poem, a set-the-scene poem, and a prose set-the-scene speech, in that order. The style and structure of each entrance speech is inherited from earlier Yuan dynasty, Ming dynasty, folk, and regional forms of Chinese opera. Another conventionalized stage speech is the exit speech, which may take the form of a poem followed by a single spoken line. This speech is usually delivered by a supporting character, and describes their present situation and state of mind. Finally, there is the recapitulation speech, in which a character will use prose to recount the story up to that point. These speeches came about as a result of the zhezixi tradition of performing only one part of a larger play.

=== Song ===
There are six main types of song lyrics in Peking opera: emotive, condemnatory, narrative, descriptive, disputive, and "shared space separate sensations" lyrics. Each type uses the same basic lyrical structure, differing only in kind and degree of emotions portrayed. Lyrics are written in couplets (lian) consisting of two lines (ju). Couplets can consist of two ten character lines, or two seven character lines. The lines are further subdivided into three dou (lit. 'pause'), typically in a 3-3-4 or 2-2-3 pattern. Lines may be "padded" with extra characters for the purpose of clarifying meaning. Rhyme is an extremely important device in Peking opera, with thirteen identified rhyme categories. Song lyrics also use the speech tones of Mandarin Chinese in ways that are pleasing to the ear and convey proper meaning and emotion. The first and second of Chinese's four tones are normally known as "level" (ping) tones in Peking opera, while the third and fourth are called "oblique" (ze). The closing line of every couplet in a song ends in a level tone.

Songs in Peking opera are proscribed by a set of common aesthetic values. A majority of songs are within a pitch range of an octave and a fifth. High pitch is a positive aesthetic value, so a performer will pitch songs at the very top of their vocal range. For this reason, the idea of a song's key has value in Peking opera only as a technical tool for the performer. Different performers in the same performance may sing in different keys, requiring the accompanying musicians to constantly retune their instruments or switch out with other players. Elizabeth Wichmann describes the ideal basic timbre for Peking opera songs as a "controlled nasal tone". Performers make extensive use of vocal vibrato during songs, in a way that is "slower" and "wider" than vibrato used in Western performances. The Peking opera aesthetic for songs is summed up by the expression zi zheng qiang yuan, meaning that the written characters should be delivered accurately and precisely, and the melodic passages should be weaving, or "round".

=== Music ===
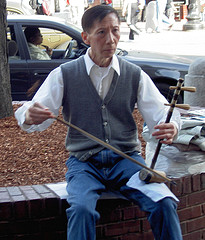
The jinghu, an instrument commonly used in Peking-opera music

The accompaniment for a Peking opera performance usually consists of a small ensemble of traditional melodic and percussion instruments. The lead melodic instrument is the jinghu, a small, high-pitched, two-string spike fiddle. The jinghu is the primary accompaniment for performers during songs. Accompaniment is heterophonic – the jinghu player follows the basic contours of the song's melody, but diverges in pitch and other elements. The jinghu often plays more notes per measure than the performer sings, and does so an octave lower. During rehearsal, the jinghu player adopts their own signature version of the song's melody, but also must adapt to spontaneous improvisations on the part of the performer due to changed performance conditions. Thus, the jinghu player must have an instinctive ability to change their performance without warning to properly accompany the performer.

The second is the circular bodied plucked lute, the yueqin. Percussion instruments include the daluo, xiaoluo, and naobo. The player of the gu and ban, a small high pitch drum and clapper, is the conductor of the entire ensemble. The two main musical styles of Peking opera, Xipi and Erhuang, originally differed in subtle ways. In the Xipi style, the strings of the jinghu are tuned to the keys of A and D. The melodies in this style are very disjointed, possibly reflecting the style's derivation from the high and loud melodies of the Qinqiang opera of northwestern China. It is commonly used to tell joyous stories. In Erhuang, on the other hand, the strings are tuned to the keys of C and G. This reflects the low, soft, and despondent folk tunes of south-central Hubei province, the style's place of origin. As a result, it is used for lyrical stories. Both musical styles have a standard meter of two beats per bar. The two musical styles share six different tempos, including manban (a slow tempo), yuanban (a standard, medium-fast tempo), kuai sanyan ("leading beat"), daoban ("leading beat"), sanban ("rubato beat"), and yaoban ("shaking beat"). The xipi style also uses several unique tempos, including erliu ("two-six"), and kuaiban (a fast tempo). Of these tempos, yuanban, manban, and kuaiban are most commonly seen. The tempo at any given time is controlled by a percussion player who acts as director. Erhuang has been seen as more improvisational, and Xipi as more tranquil. The lack of defined standards among performance troupes and the passage of time may have made the two styles more similar to each other today.

The melodies played by the accompaniment mainly fall into three broad categories. The first is the aria. The arias of Peking opera can be further divided into those of the Erhuang and Xipi varieties. An example of an aria is wawa diao, an aria in the Xipi style that is sung by a young Sheng to indicate heightened emotion. The second type of melody heard in Peking opera is the fixed-tune melody, or qupai. These are instrumental tunes that serve a wider range of purposes than arias. Examples include the "Water Dragon Tune" (水龍吟; Shuǐlóng Yín), which generally denotes the arrival of an important person, and "Triple Thrust" (急三槍; Jí Sān Qiāng), which may signal a feast or banquet. The final type of musical accompaniment is the percussion pattern. Such patterns provide context to the music in ways similar to the fixed-tune melodies. For example, there are as many as 48 different percussion patterns that accompany stage entrances. Each one identifies the entering character by their individual rank and personality.

== Repertoire ==
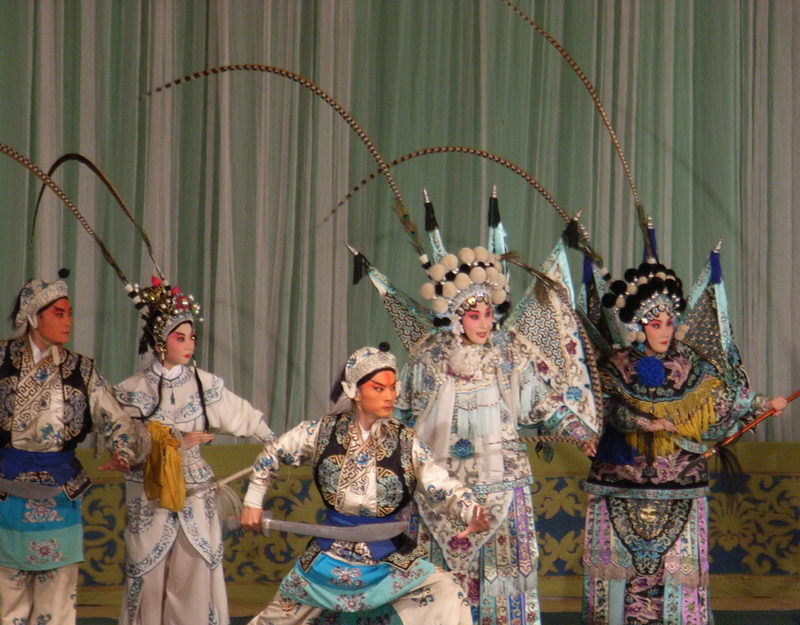
A scene from a play based on the Generals of the Yang Family legends

The repertoire of Peking opera includes nearly 1,400 works. The plays are mostly taken from historical novels or traditional stories about civil, political and military struggles. Early plays were often adaptations from earlier Chinese theatre styles, such as kunqu. Nearly half of 272 plays listed in 1824 were derived from earlier styles. Many classification systems have been used to sort the plays. Two traditional methods have existed since Peking opera first appeared in China. The oldest and most generally used system is to sort plays into civil and martial types. Civil plays focus on the relationships between characters, and feature personal, domestic, and romantic situations. The element of singing is frequently used to express emotion in this type of play. Martial plays feature a greater emphasis on action and combat skill. The two types of play also feature different arrays of performers. Martial plays predominantly feature young sheng, jing, and chou, while civil plays have a greater need for older roles and dan. In addition to being civil or martial, plays are also classified as either daxi (serious) or xiaoxi (light). The performance elements and performers used in serious and light plays greatly resemble those used in martial and civil plays, respectively. Of course, the aesthetic principle of synthesis frequently leads to the use of these contrasting elements in combination, yielding plays that defy such dichotomous classification.

Since 1949, a more detailed classification system has been put into use based on thematic content and the historical period of a play's creation. The first category in this system is chuantongxi, traditional plays that were in performance before 1949. The second category is xinbian de lishixi, historical plays written after 1949. This type of play was not produced at all during the Cultural Revolution, but is a major focus today. The final category is xiandaixi, contemporary plays. The subject matter of these plays is taken from the 20th century and beyond. Contemporary productions are also frequently experimental in nature, and may incorporate Western influences. In the second half of the 20th century, Western works have increasingly been adapted for Peking opera. The works of Shakespeare have been especially popular. The movement to adapt Shakespeare to the stage has encompassed all forms of Chinese theatre. Peking opera in particular has seen versions of A Midsummer Night's Dream and King Lear, among others. In 2017, Li Wenrui wrote in China Daily that 10 masterpieces of the traditional Peking opera repertoire are The Drunken Concubine, Monkey King, Farewell My Concubine, A River All Red, Wen Ouhong's Unicorn Trapping Purse ("the representative work of Peking Opera master Chen Yanqiu"), White Snake Legend, The Ruse of the Empty City (from Romance of the Three Kingdoms), Du Mingxin's Female Generals of the Yang Family, Wild Boar Forest, and The Phoenix Returns Home.

== Film ==
Peking opera and its stylistic devices have appeared in many Chinese films. It often was used to signify a unique "Chineseness" in contrast to sense of culture being presented in Japanese films. Fei Mu, a director of the pre-Communist era, used Peking opera in a number of plays, sometimes within Westernized, realistic plots. King Hu, a later Chinese film director, used many of the formal norms of Peking opera in his films, such as the parallelism between music, voice, and gesture. In the 1993 film Farewell My Concubine, by Chen Kaige, Peking opera serves as the object of pursuit for the protagonists and a backdrop for their romance. However, the film's portrayal of Peking opera has been criticized as one-dimensional.

== See also ==
- China National Peking Opera Company
- Huguang Guild Hall
- Yun Jin, a Genshin Impact character based on Peking opera performers
- Yunbai
- Zheng Yici Peking Opera Theatre
