= Black Slave's Cry to Heaven =

1907 stage play by the Spring Willow Society

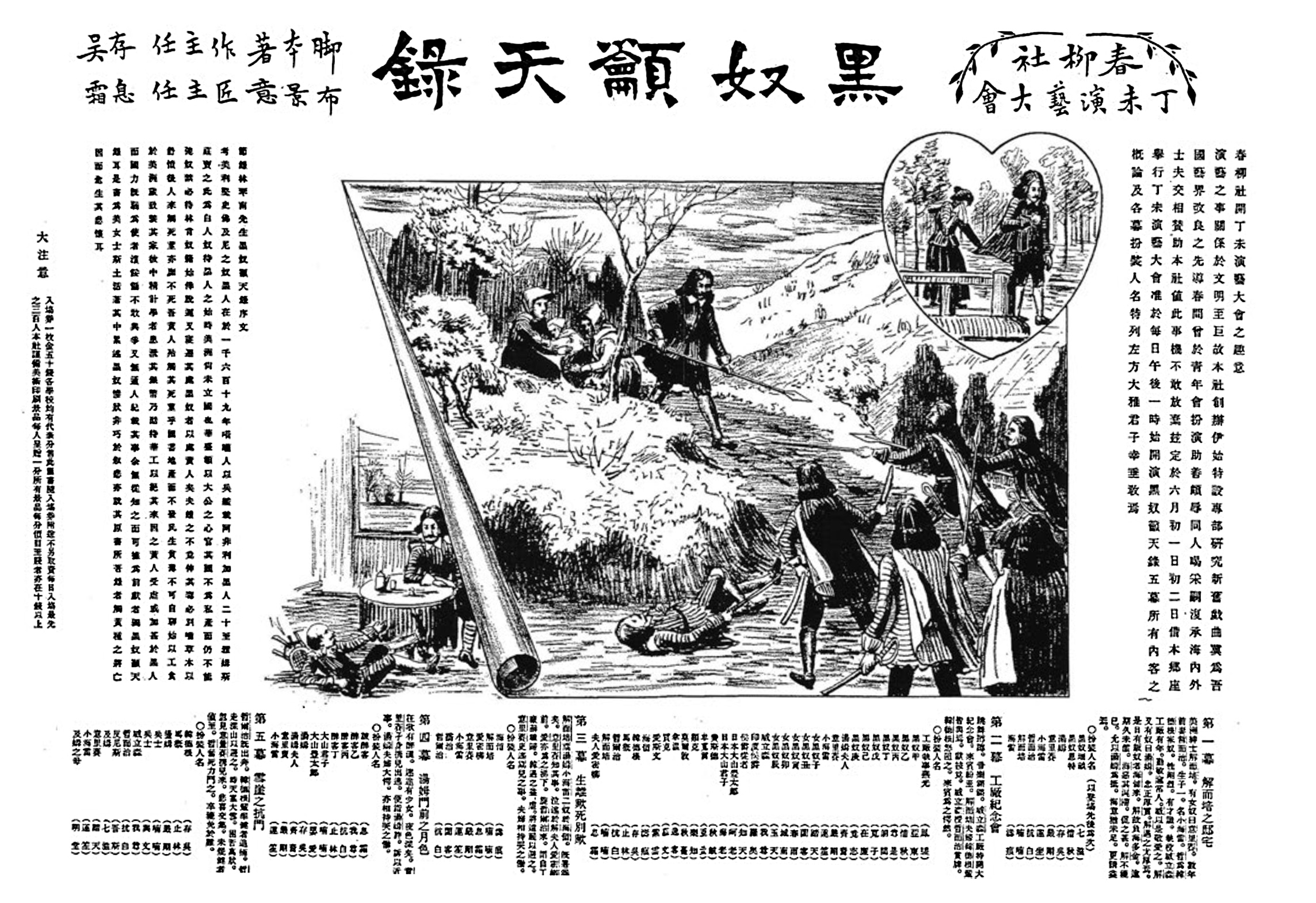
- Original poster
- Original title: 黑奴籲天錄
- Original language: Chinese
- Written by: Zeng Xiaogu
- Based on: Uncle Tom's Cabin by Harriet Beecher Stowe

Premiere
- Date: 1 June 1907

Black Slave's Cry to Heaven
- Traditional Chinese: 黑奴籲天錄
- Simplified Chinese: 黑奴吁天录
Transcriptions
Standard Mandarin
- Hanyu Pinyin: Hēinú Yūtiān Lù
- Wade–Giles: Hei^{1}-nu^{2} Yü^{1}-t'ien^{1} Lu^{4}
- IPA: [xéɪ.nǔ ý.tʰjɛ́n lû]

Black Slave's Cry to Heaven (Chinese: 黑奴籲天錄; pinyin: Hēinú Yūtiān Lù) was a 1907 stage play performed by the Spring Willow Society, a Chinese student troupe in Tokyo, Japan. Adapted by Chinese actor Zeng Xiaogu from a translation of Harriet Beecher Stowe's 1858 novel Uncle Tom's Cabin, the play focused on the experiences and eventual escape of two slaves, Eliza and George.

Modified to call attention allegorically to the experiences of Chinese migrants in the United States, Black Slave's Cry to Heaven was innovative in its use of spoken dialogue and realistic set designs. Performed twice at the Hongō-za Theatre, the show was well received by critics and audiences. Although its script has been lost, the play has inspired subsequent works. Due to its technical innovations and nationalist themes, Black Slave's Cry to Heaven has been canonized as the first modern Western-style Chinese drama.

== Synopsis ==
The American farmer Arthur Shelby and his wife Emily own several slaves, including Tom, Eliza, and Eliza's son Harry. They also owe a large amount of money to the slave trader Haley, who pressures them to pay immediately. The Shelbys offer him their slaves as payment. Meanwhile, at a party at the Wilson Factory, the slave George is denied recognition for his hard work after his owner Harris takes away his award. When he returns home, he learns from his wife Eliza that Harry is to be sold to Haley. Crying in each other's arms, they decide to run away. That night, taking advantage of a raucous crowd, the slaves make a bid for freedom. They are chased by hunters, including Harris, but escape after killing several of their pursuers. (Note: The script for this play is no longer extant (Yu 2009, p. 3). This synopsis is based on a summary by Ouyang (1984, pp. 144–146); an English-language summary, excluding the cast list, is provided by Liu (2013, pp. 45–46).)

== Background ==
In the late 19th and early 20th centuries, following a series of military defeats against Western powers and Japan, the Qing dynasty sought to implement reform. Drama took a special place in this agenda, as it was perceived as being better able to reach the common person; at the time, most Chinese were illiterate. In a 1905 essay, the philosopher Chen Duxiu argued, "theater is a big school for the world, and actors are teachers of the people." Spoken-word drama, which had been introduced to China through cultural interchange, was perceived as ideal for such reform.

Parallel to this development, a large number of Chinese students began to study in Japan. The number of Chinese students in Japan increased from three in 1896 to a thousand in 1903, and between eight and nine thousand in 1907. Japan was seen as a cheaper alternative to studying in Europe or the United States; it was also perceived as more familiar in its language and culture. Although these students were generally not in Japan to study theatre, many attended drama performances to hone their language skills.

== Production ==
Black Slave's Cry to Heaven was put on by the Spring Willow Society. Established in late 1906, this Tokyo-based group of Chinese students was guided by the Japanese dramatist Fujisawa Asajirō. In early 1907 the troupe had performed the third act of Alexandre Dumas fils' The Lady of the Camellias (1852), drawing from the conventions of shinpa, a Japanese form of spoken-word drama. As a follow-up to this successful performance, the troupe decided to do a larger show, for which it brought in new members.

For this performance, the Spring Willow Society adapted an American novel: Harriet Beecher Stowe's novel Uncle Tom's Cabin (1852). The script for this play in five acts was penned by Zeng Xiaogu, a student of the Tokyo School of Fine Arts, based on the first five chapters of a Chinese-language translation by Lin Shu and Wei Yi that had been published in 1901. In his foreword, Lin likened the enslavement of African Americans to the experiences of Chinese migrants in the United States; (Note: Lin regularly wrote introductions that placed his translations within the context of providing "intimate knowledge of the strengths and ills of Western societies", with a particular focus on said societies' exploitation of other races (Jin 2014, p. 107). His translation of Uncle Tom's Cabin, also titled Black Slave's Cry to Heaven, was a commercial success (Liu 2007, p. 415) and republished in 1904 and 1905 (Jin 2014, p. 107). According to the drama scholar Chang-tai Hung, its opposition to racial prejudice resonated with many younger Chinese (Hung 1994, p. 20).) this allegorical approach was also taken by the stageplay. Such a reliance on a detailed script differed from most contemporary Chinese theatre, wherein stories were presented as general synopses and filled out by actors through improvisation.

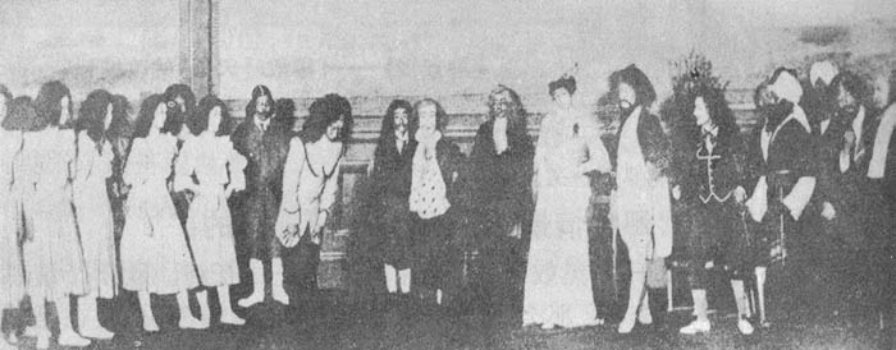
The party at the Wilson Factory; Black Slave's Cry to Heaven included several elements not present in the source novel.

Generally, Black Slave's Cry to Heaven followed the first five chapters of the source novel before skipping to its seventeenth chapter. To bring out the allegory, several modifications were made during the adaptation process. It focused not on the titular Uncle Tom, but on the slaves George and Eliza. Throughout the story, Christian allegories were removed, while a scene was added in which local and foreign guests – including an Indian nobleman and a Japanese dignitary – attend a party at the Wilson Factory. Furthermore, rather than be emancipated by an outsider, the slaves free themselves, with Tom – beaten to death in the novel – joining George and Eliza during their bid for freedom. (Note: In an essay on the production of Black Slave's Cry to Heaven, Ouyang (1984, p. 147) wrote that this was intended to facilitate the ending while providing audiences with a sense of relief.) The drama scholar Shiao-ling Yu, writing in 2009, describes these changes as giving the play a clear message: "the Chinese people must resist imperialist aggression if they hope to be free."

Li Shutong served as stage designer for Black Slave's Cry to Heaven, producing scenery and costumes that clearly distinguished between settings and differentiated slave owners and slaves. Such scenery and costumes, as well as makeup, differed from the more abstract forms used in traditional Chinese theatre. Also unlike traditional theatre, the show employed minimal dancing or singing, which appeared only in the second-act party scene. It also omitted soliloquies and asides, focusing on naturalistic dialogue. In a 1908 interview, Spring Willow Society member Lu Jingruo argued that "traditional Chinese xiqu [opera] was bound to die out, to be replaced by a new kind of drama [...] enthusiastically received by the populace."

All members of the Spring Willow Society were men, and thus Black Slave's Cry to Heaven had male actors in both male and female roles; such an arrangement was standard in contemporary Chinese theatre. George Harris was portrayed by Xie Kangbai, with Emily Shelby played by Li Shutong and her husband Arthur by Huang Nannan. Ouyang Yuqian took the role of an enslaved woman. Several actors are credited only with their stage names; these included the ones portraying Uncle Tom (Cunwu) and Eliza (Yangang). Rehearsals were held over the course of two months, twice per week, under the direction of Fujisawa.

== Performance and reception ==
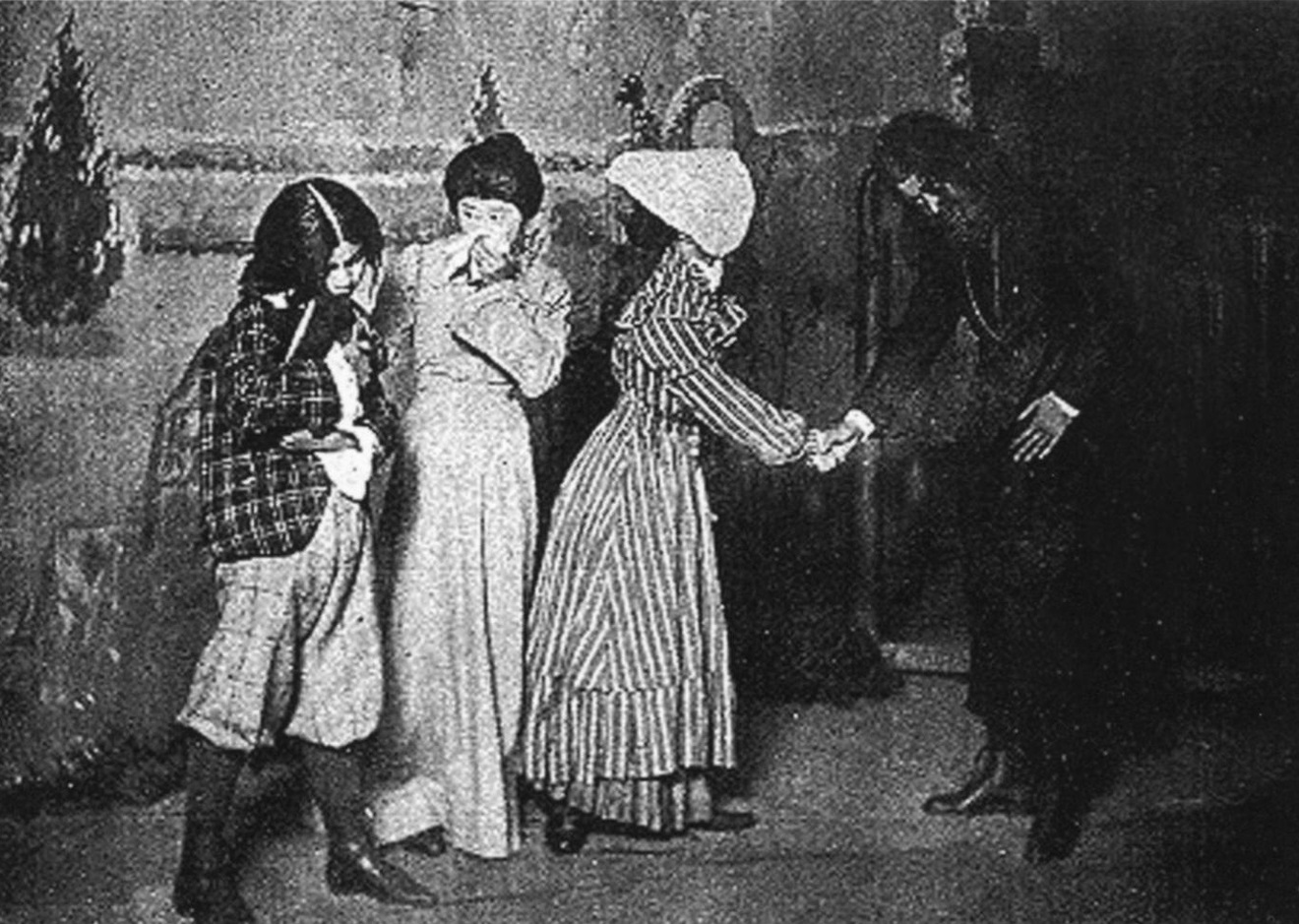
Performance of Black Slave's Cry to Heaven (1907)

Advertising for Black Slave's Cry to Heaven began in May 1907. Posters were prepared, depicting a collage of three scenes – Shelby agreeing to sell his slaves, Eliza and George together, and George fighting the slavehunters – as well as production credits. (Note: A surviving example of this poster is held by the Waseda University Tsubouchi Memorial Theatre Museum in Shinjuku, Tokyo, Japan (Liu 2013, p. 45).) Advertisements emphasized that the performance was intended to highlight the plight of Chinese workers who had been affected by the Chinese Exclusion Act. Quoting Lin Shu's preface, the poster wrote:

The yellow people (in the US) are probably treated worse than the blacks. But our country's power is weak, and our convoys are cowardly and afraid of arguing with the Americans. Furthermore, no educated person has recorded what has happened, and I have no way to gain factual knowledge. The only precedent I can rely on is A Black Slave's Cry to Heaven ... the miseries of the blacks are depicted in detail. This is not because I am especially versed in depicting sadness; I am merely transcribing what is contained in the original work. And the prospect of the imminent demise of the yellow race has made me even sadder.

Black Slave's Cry to Heaven had two showings at the Hongō-za Theatre, on 1 and 2 June 1907. Located in Tokyo's university district, the prestigious Hongō-za Theatre had premièred numerous works of shinpa and had a capacity of 1,500 people. The stage was rented for ¥500 (equivalent to ¥742,000 in 2019), with tickets priced at ¥0.50 (equivalent to ¥740 in 2019); the first 300 purchasers received a small gift. Ouyang Yuqian regarded the play as successful, having not lost money, and contemporary reviewers reported a packed house.

Reception of Black Slave's Cry to Heaven in the Japanese press was favourable, with laudatory reviews in all of Tokyo's major newspapers. The theatre critic Ihara Seiseian viewed its stage design as better than those of Japanese amateur troupes, while the actor Doi Shunsho declared the acting to be better than that of contemporary shinpa stars. The reviewer for the Asahi Shimbun praised the acting, giving particular attention to those portraying the slaves. Ouyang Yuqian later described the play as the "most unforgettable experience of his life," and recalled that audiences "shed tears for Uncle Tom's and George Harris' misfortune and gnashed their teeth in hatred of slave owners."

In October 1908, Black Slave's Cry to Heaven was staged again using a different script by Wang Zhongsheng at the Lyceum Theatre in Shanghai; the dramatist Ren Tianzhi also considered performing the Spring Willow Society's version in the city. Unlike the Tokyo performance, the acting in this version was done in a Peking opera style. However, other elements of Western dramaturgy were retained. The work was divided into clear acts, with specific sets and setpieces, and emphasis was given to realistic scenery and lighting. Audience reception appears to have been negative; the drama historian Siyuan Liu attributes this to the need to pause between scenes, an element not found in traditional theatre.

== Legacy ==
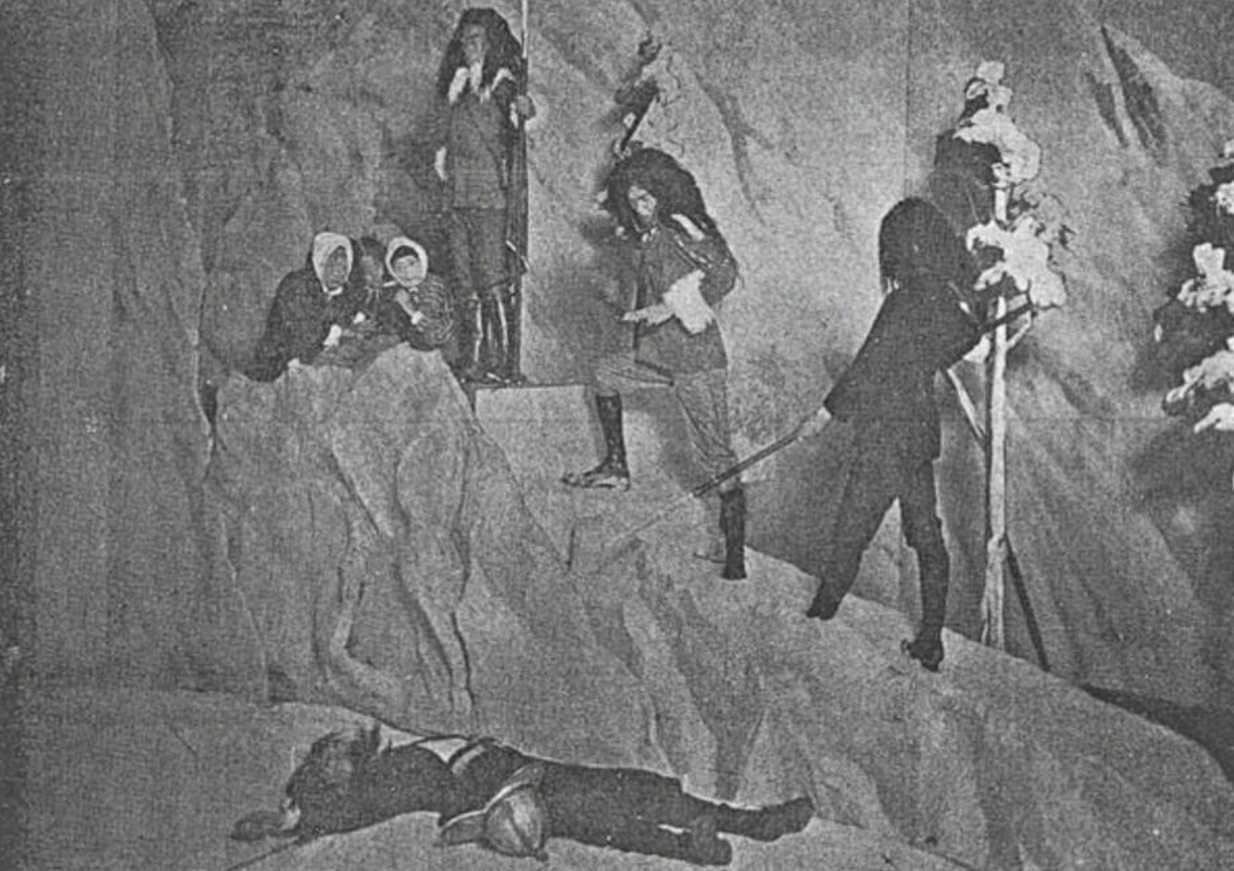
Act 5, depicting the escape of the slaves; its nationalist themes contributed to Black Slave's Cry to Heaven being canonized as the first modern Chinese drama.

Black Slave's Cry to Heaven has been canonized as the first modern Western-style Chinese drama, gaining this recognition based on a history of modern Chinese drama prepared in 1957 by dramatists including Tian Han and Ouyang Yuqian. Liu writes that this was a calculated decision, as it "erased the contested hybridity of spoken theatre's birth cycle" while simultaneously emphasizing a work with a nationalistic message. Earlier performances by European expatriate communities are recorded, but had little effect on the Chinese community. Meanwhile, several Chinese dramatists had attempted to implement reform through the incorporation of elements of western dramaturgy into Peking opera, such as Wang Xiaonong in his Reap What You Sow (1904). The literature scholar Shouhua Qi writes that "none of the early drama reform endeavours ... were as self-conscious, extensive, and indeed revolutionary as those mounted by the young students of the Spring Willow Society in 1907."

In the years following Black Slave's Cry to Heaven, spoken-word dramas became more common, with university troupes performing adaptations of foreign works in Shanghai, Beijing, Nanjing, and Suzhou; this included the Spring Willow Society, which staged a well-received adaptation of Victorien Sardou's La Tosca (1852) in Tokyo in 1909. Members of the Society returned to China after their studies, with alumni such as Lu Jingruo, Ouyang Yuqian, and Wang Zhongsheng developing a hybrid of traditional and modern dramatic forms known as civilized drama. Following the New Culture Movement, as well as the introduction of realism as taught by Henrik Ibsen, traditional influences were weaned out to establish the modern form known as huaju. Such dramas remain distinguished from traditional forms predominantly through their use of spoken, rather than sung, dialogue.

In commemoration of Black Slave's Cry to Heaven, several further adaptations of Uncle Tom's Cabin have been written and produced on significant anniversaries. In 1958, to commemorate the fiftieth anniversary of modern drama in China, Ouyang Yuqian produced Regret of the Black Slaves (黑奴恨). While this adaptation again presented the slaves as freeing themselves, it put greater emphasis on resistance and class struggle, simultaneously decrying racism in the United States. For the centenary of the performance, the Shanghai-based dramatist Nick Rongjun Yu wrote a third adaptation: Cry to Heaven (吁天; 籲天, 2007). Directed by Chen Xinyi, this play in six acts depicted the evolution of modern drama in China alongside and in parallel with the experiences of the novel's slaves. The centenary was also commemorated with Search for Spring Willow Society (2007), a performance by the Beijing-based Tufeng Drama Troupe that dramatized the making of Black Slave's Cry to Heaven.

== Works cited ==
- Ammirati, Megan (2019). "Uncle Tom's Cabin in China". Asian Theatre Journal. 36 (1): 165–188. doi:10.1353/atj.2019.0008. JSTOR 26732446.
- Hung, Chang-tai (1994). War and Popular Culture: Resistance in Modern China, 1937–1945. Berkeley: University of California Press. ISBN 978-0-520-35486-9.
- Jin, Li (2012). "Theater of Pathos: Sentimental Melodramas in the New Drama Legacy". Modern Chinese Literature and Culture. 24 (2): 94–128. JSTOR 42940560.
- Jin, Wen (2014). "Sentimentalism's Transnational Journeys: 'Bitter Society' and Lin Shu's Translation of 'Uncle Tom's Cabin'". Modern Chinese Literature and Culture. 26 (1): 105–136. JSTOR 42940474.
- Liu, Siyuan (2006). "The Impact of Shinpa on Early Chinese Huaju". Asian Theatre Journal. 23 (2): 342–355. doi:10.1353/atj.2006.0024. JSTOR 4137058.
- Liu, Siyuan (2007). "Adaptation as Appropriation: Staging Western Drama in the First Western-Style Theatres in Japan and China". Theatre Journal. 59 (3): 411–429. doi:10.1353/tj.2007.0159. JSTOR 25070065.
- Liu, Siyuan (2009). "Performing Gender at the Beginning of Modern Chinese Theatre". TDR: The Drama Review. 53 (2): 35–50. doi:10.1162/dram.2009.53.2.35. JSTOR 25599473.
- Liu, Siyuan (2013). Performing Hybridity in Colonial-Modern China. New York: Palgrave Macmillan. ISBN 978-1-137-30611-1.
- Mackerras, Colin (2008). "Tradition, Change, and Continuity in Chinese Theatre in the Last Hundred Years: In Commemoration of the Spoken Drama Centenary". Asian Theatre Journal. 25 (1): 1–23. doi:10.1353/atj.2008.0012. JSTOR 27568433.
- Ouyang, Yuqian (1984). 回忆春柳 [Reminiscences of the Spring Willow Society]. 欧阳予倩戏剧论文集 [Ouyang Yuqian's Collected Essays on Drama] (in Chinese). Shanghai: Shanghai Wenyi Chubanshe. pp. 142–174.
- Qi, Shouhua (2018). Adapting Western Classics for the Chinese Stage. London and New York: Routledge. ISBN 978-1-315-44616-5.
- 清国留学生演劇黒奴躍天録 [The Tale of the Black Slave, a Play by Chinese Students]. Asahi Shimbun (in Japanese). No. 7468. 4 June 1911. p. 7.
- Yu, Shiao-Ling (2009). "'Cry to Heaven': A Play to Celebrate One Hundred Years of Chinese Spoken Drama by Nick Rongjun Yu". Asian Theatre Journal. 26 (1): 1–53. doi:10.1353/atj.0.0036. JSTOR 20638798.
