= Civilized drama =

Chinese theatre genre

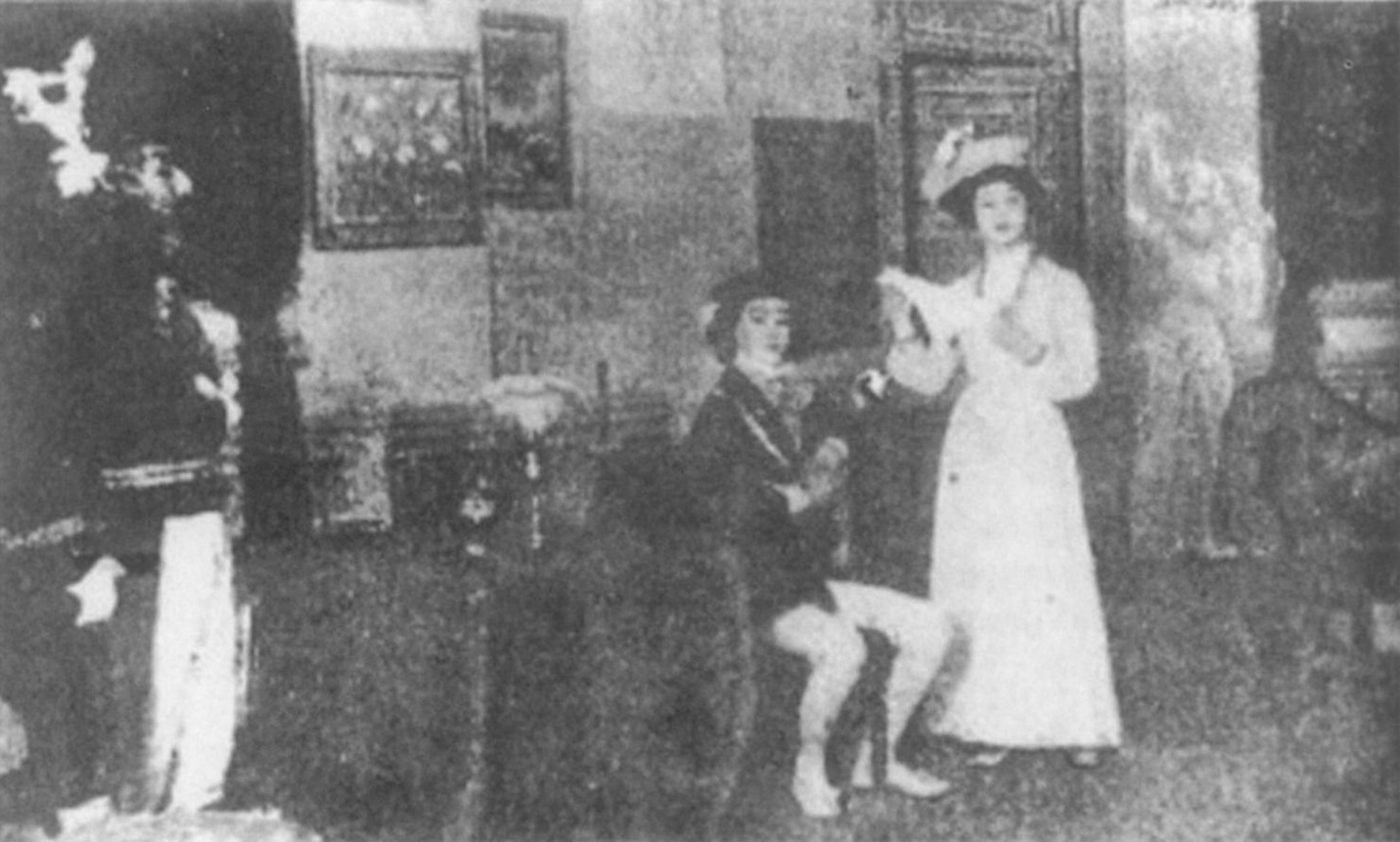
The Spring Willow Society performing Victorien Sardou's La Tosca (1909), with Lu Jingruo and Ouyang Yuqian in the main roles

Civilized drama (simplified Chinese: 文明戏; traditional Chinese: 文明戲; pinyin: wénmíng xì) was a genre of spoken-word and operatic drama that emerged in the late Qing dynasty and remained popular through the early years of the Republic of China. Drawing from traditional forms of theatre and, through the Japanese shinpa, Western dramatical conventions, the genre emerged in the early 1910s as part of a broader push towards modernization. Major troupes, mostly established by Chinese dramatists who had studied in Japan, were established in Shanghai and found success. The genre peaked in 1917, and fell into disfavour by the mid-1920s.

Conventionally, civilized dramas drew from traditional theatrical forms by emphasizing improvisation over detailed scripts and, at first, relying solely on male performers. At the same time, they introduced unprecedented levels of realism through detailed set pieces and special effects. Stories were diverse, and included original compositions as well as adaptations of foreign tales. Thematically, early works promoted nationalism and anti-Qing sentiments, before expanding to include family melodramas and contemporary events. Several civilized drama performers and writers subsequently contributed to early Chinese cinema; the genre also influenced huaju, a form with higher levels of realism.

== History ==
=== Background ===
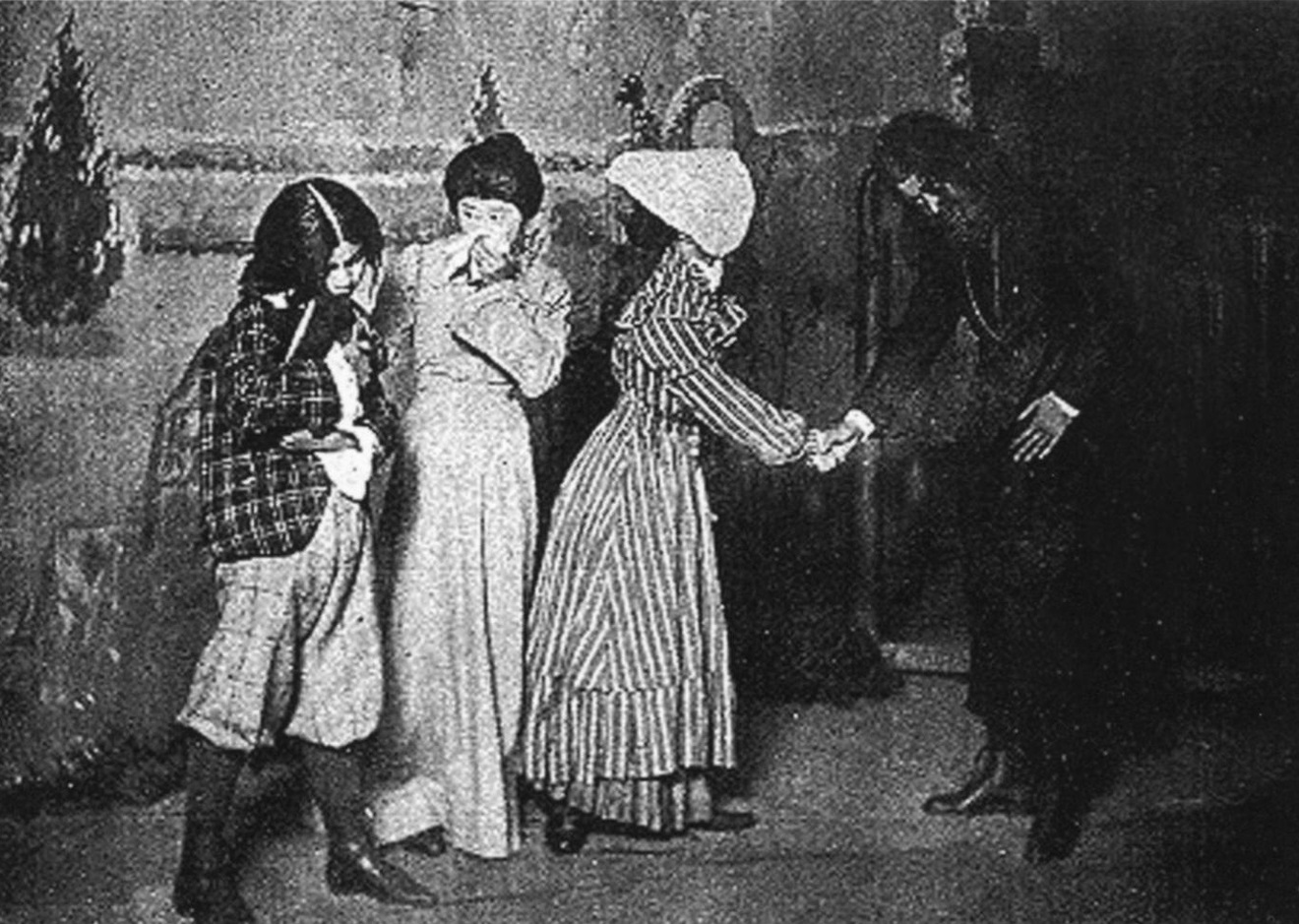
Black Slave's Cry to Heaven, an adaptation of Harriett Beecher Stowe's Uncle Tom's Cabin (1852) performed by Chinese students in Japan, 1907

In the late 19th century, the Qing dynasty made a large push to modernize China, driven in part by failed military confrontations with Western and Japanese forces and in part by cultural intersections. This drive towards modernization included in theatre, where sung dramas with highly stylized acting such as the Peking and Cantonese operas were prominent. Theatre was perceived as a potential means of promoting social change, which could contribute to China's rise as a global power. Student troupes experimented with mixing sung theatre with spoken-word performances, while other groups developed a style of performance ("new fashion plays", 时装新戏; 時裝新戲) wherein modern costumes were used in traditional performances.

Further influence came from the Japanese hybrid drama form shinpa through students studying in Japan. The Japanese dramatist Fujisawa Asajirō, noted for his shinpa performances, led a group of Chinese students in Tokyo in staging an act from Alexandre Dumas fils' The Lady of the Camellias (1852) in February 1907. The group, calling themselves the Spring Willow Society, adapted Harriett Beecher Stowe's Uncle Tom's Cabin (1852) under the title Black Slave's Cry to Heaven in June of that year. Receiving critical acclaim from the Japanese press, this troupe continued for several years. Its alumni later established the most prominent civilized drama troupes.

=== Rise and fall ===
Blending these various influences, a new genre emerged. In the vein of other efforts to modernize China, the new form of theatre was termed "civilized" (文明). This term carried connotations of progress and progressiveness. The genre gained particular popularity in Shanghai, which as a major trading port had experienced significant cross-cultural interactions. New drama troupes were established regularly beginning in the late 1900s, with prominent ones including Lu Jingruo and Ouyang Yuqian's Spring Willow Theatre, Ren Tianzhi's Progressive Troupe, Wang Zhongsheng's Spring Sun Society, and Zheng Zhengqiu's New Masses Society.

With the 1911 revolution, the civilized drama found fertile ground in the anti-Qing circles. Following the success of the revolution and the establishment of the Republic of China, however, audience interest in politically charged performances waned. In 1914, after playwrights introduced new themes, the genre saw a resurgence. Performances during this period became highly commercialized. The genre peaked around 1917, with shows continuing until 1924.

== Style ==
As a genre, civilized drama represented a hybrid form that blended traditional Chinese and Western modes of performance. These works were generally performed based on general outlines and included extensive improvisation. Nevertheless, some stories were performed using comprehensive scripts, while other scripts were written – sometimes in classical Chinese – with the sole intent of publication for readers. Thematically, many early stories were politically charged. Following the 1911 revolution, as tastes shifted, topics such as family, marriage, and contemporary social issues were more prominent. After Japan made its Twenty-One Demands in 1915, nationalist themes experienced a resurgence.

Stories could be original compositions, or translated from foreign works. These works were not always adapted directly; for instance, Bao Tianxiao and Xu Banmei staged an adaptation of Victor Hugo's Angelo, Tyrant of Padua (1835) via a Japanese adaptation by Satō Karoku, while Zheng Zhengqiu used Charles and Mary Lamb's Tales from Shakespeare (1807) as the basis for adapting William Shakespeare's Merchant of Venice, Romeo and Juliet, The Taming of the Shrew, and Othello. Some performances drew from contemporary news stories, with one being based on the 1920 murder of Wang Lianying.

Unlike earlier operas, wherein scenery was predominantly symbolic, civilized dramas used more realistic set designs and lighting. During scene changes, troupes would stage smaller performances in front of the curtain. Contemporary audiences were accustomed to performances with no interruptions, and this enabled scenes to be changed while still maintaining audience interest. This practice became less common over time. Other elements of traditional opera performances, such as the use of gongs, were noted in early civilized plays. Special effects were used on stage, with a 1910 adaptation of Hall Caine's The Bondman (1890) using fireworks to simulate a volcanic eruption.

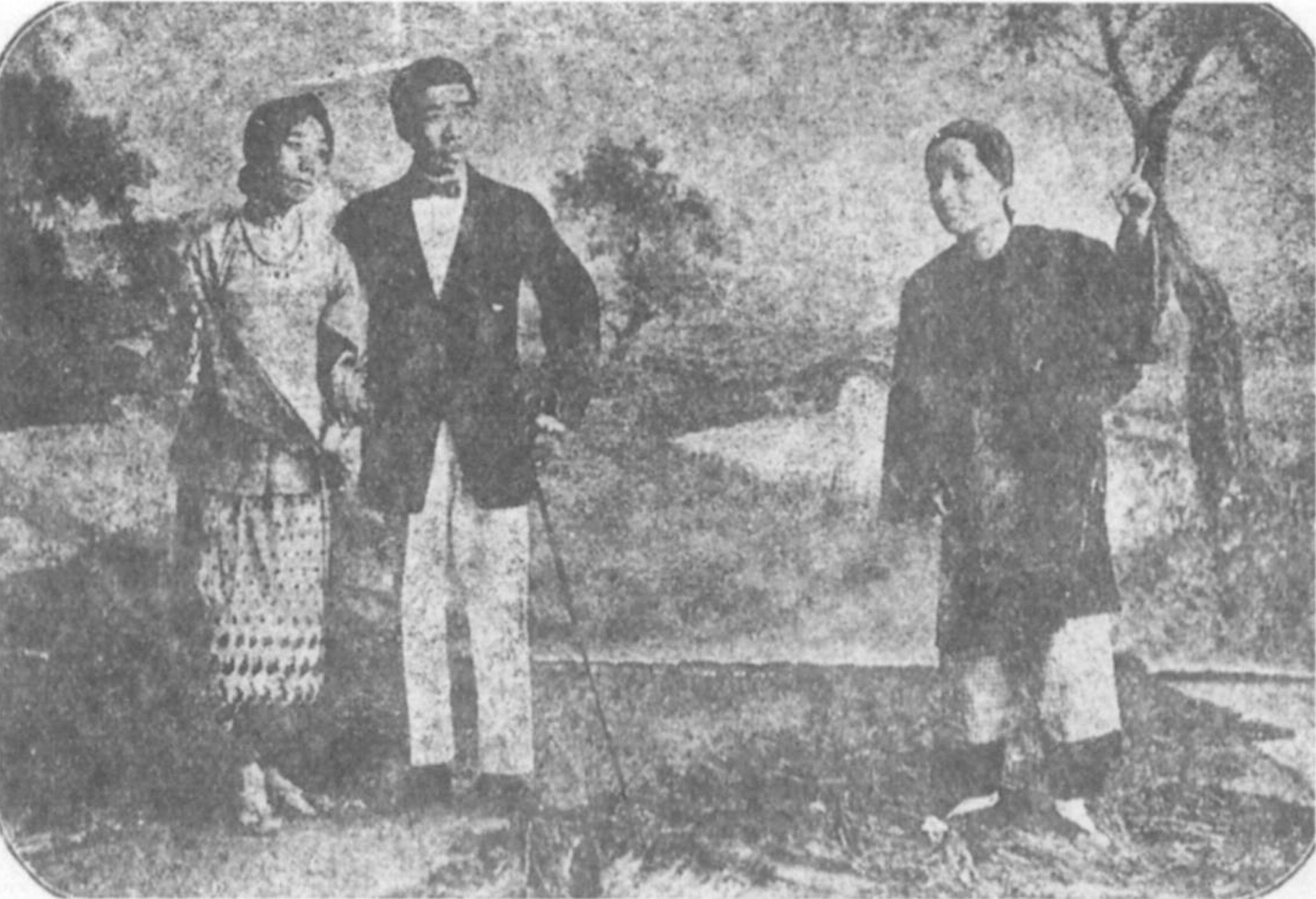
Qingxing, Zhou Jianyun, and Yifeng in Hototogisu (c. 1910); civilized dramas generally cast male actors in both male and female roles.

For the earliest performances, all actors were men, who portrayed both male and female characters; women were not allowed to join troupes located in Shanghai's International Settlement. Later, some female performers began to appear on stage, with the French Concession–based Prosperity Society being integrated. Several all-women troupes were also recorded, with the first established in 1912. The appropriateness of mixed troupes and performances was discussed through the mid-1910s; proponents argued that it allowed for more natural performances, while opponents decried it as promoting obscenity. The critic Zhou Jianyun wrote, "this is usually the most disgusting moment when the two parties flirt and act as if it were for real, revealing all forms of sickening behaviour in front of the audience."

For characters, existing archetypes continued. The genre also included a new character archetype, the "civilized principal male", who would deliver speeches promoting democracy and a Westernized form of civilization. By 1914, eight male archetypes and six female ones were recorded. Performances emphasized exaggerated motions, with which actors perceived themselves as better able to influence audiences. The dramatist Zheng Zhengqiu argued that, "the more flamboyant the actor is on stage, the more able he is to lift the audience's spirit".

== Impact ==
Civilized drama is regarded as a precursor of huaju, a genre of spoken drama that gained popularity among amateur troupes in the 1920s. Stemming from the New Culture Movement, as well as realism taught by Henrik Ibsen, early huaju was mostly marked by a focus on dialogue and social themes. However, some groups – such as the national theatre movement under Yu Shangyuan – sought to maintain hybridity in stage performances. Hybrid forms continued into the 1950s, at which time they were known as "popular spoken dramas". Histories of Chinese theatre have generally neglected civilized drama, considering the genre little more than a transition.

Civilized dramas also contributed to early Chinese cinema. The playwright Zheng Zhengqiu, who had directed numerous performances, was brought on by Zhang Shichuan to write the script for his A Difficult Couple (1913); the men would ultimately establish a film company, Mingxing, together and guide it into becoming "the largest and most influential film company in China". Other civilized drama performers and writers who entered the film industry included Guan Haifeng and Ouyang Yuqian. In the first years of the industry, performance styles from the civilized drama stage were maintained, though critics came to disapprove of it.

== Works cited ==
- Jia, Binwu (2022). "Zheng Zhegu and Performances in Early Chinese Film". Journal of Chinese Film Studies. 2 (2): 261–276. doi:10.1515/jcfs-2022-0002.
- Liu, Siyuan (2003). "Huajü (Hua Chü)". In Kennedy, Dennis (ed.). The Oxford Encyclopedia of Theatre and Performance. doi:10.1093/acref/9780198601746.001.0001. ISBN 978-0-19-860174-6.
- Liu, Siyuan (2003). "Wenming Xi (Wen Ming Hsi)". In Kennedy, Dennis (ed.). The Oxford Encyclopedia of Theatre and Performance. doi:10.1093/acref/9780198601746.001.0001. ISBN 978-0-19-860174-6.
- Liu, Siyuan (2006). "The Impact of Shinpa on Early Chinese Huaju". Asian Theatre Journal. 23 (2): 342–355. doi:10.1353/atj.2006.0024. JSTOR 4137058.
- Liu, Siyuan (2007). "Adaptation as Appropriation: Staging Western Drama in the First Western-Style Theatres in Japan and China". Theatre Journal. 59 (3): 411–429. doi:10.1353/tj.2007.0159. JSTOR 25070065.
- Liu, Siyuan (2009). "Performing Gender at the Beginning of Modern Chinese Theatre". TDR: The Drama Review. 53 (2): 35–50. doi:10.1162/dram.2009.53.2.35. JSTOR 25599473.
- Liu, Siyuan (2023). "The "Deep Realism" of Style: From Michel Saint-Denis to Huang Zuolin". In Nakamura, Jessica; Saltzman-Li, Katherine (eds.). Realisms in East Asian Performance. University of Michigan Press. pp. 233–251. doi:10.3998/mpub.12254299. ISBN 978-0-472-07642-0. JSTOR 10.3998/mpub.12254299.18.
- Zhong, Dafeng; Zhang, Zhen; Zhang, Yingjin (1997). "From Wenmingxi (Civilized Play) to Yingxi (Shadowplay): The Foundation of Shanghai Film Industry in the 1920s". Asian Cinema. 9 (1): 46–64. doi:10.1386/ac.9.1.46_1.
