= Spring Willow Society =

Chinese student theatre troupe

- 春柳社
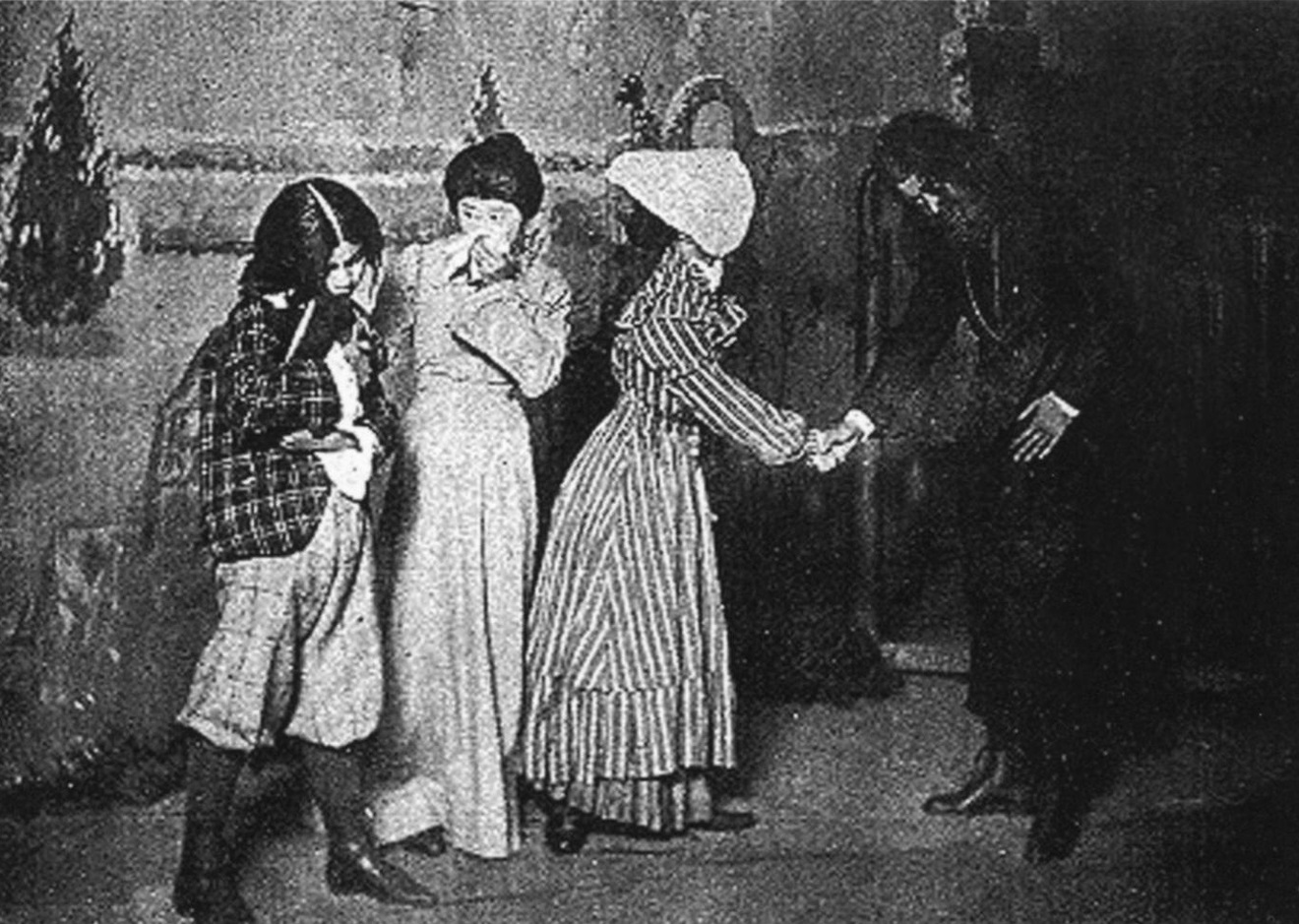
- Spring Willow performing Black Slave's Cry to Heaven (1907)
- Formation: 1906
- Dissolved: 1915
- Type: Theatre group
- Purpose: Civilized drama

The Spring Willow Society (Chinese: 春柳社; pinyin: Chūnliǔ Shè), later known as the Spring Willow Theatre (traditional Chinese: 春柳劇場; simplified Chinese: 春柳剧场; pinyin: Chūnliǔ Jùchǎng), was a Chinese drama troupe active from 1906 to 1915. Established in Tokyo by a group of Chinese students, the troupe drew from Western dramatic styles through the Japanese shinpa in its efforts to modernize Chinese theatre. Its first show, performed in 1907, was an act from Alexandre Dumas fils' The Lady of the Camellias; it subsequently adapted Harriet Beecher Stowe's novel Uncle Tom's Cabin in five acts under the title Black Slave's Cry to Heaven. Despite dwindling numbers, the troupe remained active in Tokyo through 1909, when it performed an adaptation of Victorien Sardou's La Tosca.

Alumni from the Spring Willow Society returned to China in the 1910s, seeking to continue their work in Shanghai. Under the leadership of Lu Jingruo, they developed a repertoire of more than eighty stories. Spring Willow disbanded after Lu's 1915 death. Black Slave's Cry to Heaven has been canonized as the first Western-style Chinese drama (huaju), and the troupe's adaptation of Othello may have been the first full-length performance of a Shakespearean play in the country.

== History ==
=== Background ===
In the late 19th and early 20th centuries, the Qing dynasty sought to implement reform and modernize after experiencing a series of military defeats against Western powers and Japan. Drama was perceived as better able to reach the common person than written literature, as literacy was uncommon in contemporary China. It thus occupied a special place in the modernization effort, with the philosopher Chen Duxiu arguing in 1905 that "theater is a big school for the world, and actors are teachers of the people." Spoken-word drama, which had been introduced to China through cultural interchange, was perceived as ideal for such modernization, and the Meiji Restoration in Japan had shown that such approaches could be successful.

Around this time, Chinese students began studying in Japan. From three in 1896, the number increased to a thousand in 1903, and by 1907 the country hosted between eight and nine thousand Chinese students. Japan was perceived as more similar to China in its language and culture than Europe or the United States; it was also significantly cheaper. Generally, these students were not in Japan to study theatre, but drama was popular as a means of improving their language skills. One Chinese student, Xu Banmei, wrote that attending stage performances allowed for faster language acquisition as well as more diverse experiences.

=== Japan ===
The Spring Willow Society was established in Tokyo, Japan, in late 1906, with the mission statement of studying various forms of art and literature. Early members included Li Shutong and Zeng Xiaogu, both of whom had enjoyed Chinese opera before travelling to Japan. One element of the troupe sought to review Chinese operas, both traditional and contemporary, in order to identify potential areas of reform. Other members of the society were involved in music, literature, and the fine arts. In its early works, the troupe was guided by the Japanese dramatist Fujisawa Asajirō, a proponent of the shinpa style that blended traditional Japanese drama with Western borrowings.

Spring Willow's first performance was an adaptation of the third act of Alexandre Dumas fils' The Lady of the Camellias (1852). The drama scholar Siyuan Liu suggests that the story was derived from a Japanese-language translation by Osada Shuutoo, with reference to a Chinese-language adaptation by Lin Shu. This performance, held in early 1907 during Lunar New Year festivities, was sponsored by the local branch of the YMCA to raise funds for disaster relief after serious flooding in the Yangtze and Huai River basins. Li Shutong took the titular role, with Zeng Xiaogu, Tang Ken, and Sun Zongwen in supporting roles.

Desiring to build on the success of this performance, Spring Willow decided to adapt a longer story to stage. Its next performance was Black Slave's Cry to Heaven, adapted in five acts from a translation of Harriet Beecher Stowe's novel Uncle Tom's Cabin (1852). In preparation, the troupe took new talent, including Ouyang Yuqian, Wu Wozun, and Xie Kangbai. Zeng Xiaogu, a student of the Tokyo School of Fine Arts, prepared the script, with Li Shutong handling stage design. Rehearsals were held over the course of two months, meeting twice per week. The show was performed on 1 and 2 June 1907 at the Hongō-za theatre, with contemporary reviewers noting a packed house.

Although the performance was successful, the Chinese embassy in Japan was opposed to students participating in such drama clubs; in 1909, it threatened to pull funding for any government-sponsored student who was involved in drama performances. Consequently, membership dwindled from its peak of more than eighty. Nonetheless, performances continued, and several new actors – such as Lu Jingruo – joined. In 1907, two further one-act plays were staged, one starring Li Shutong and another featuring Ouyang Yuqian and Zeng Xiaogu; both drew heavily on Western portraits in their costume designs.

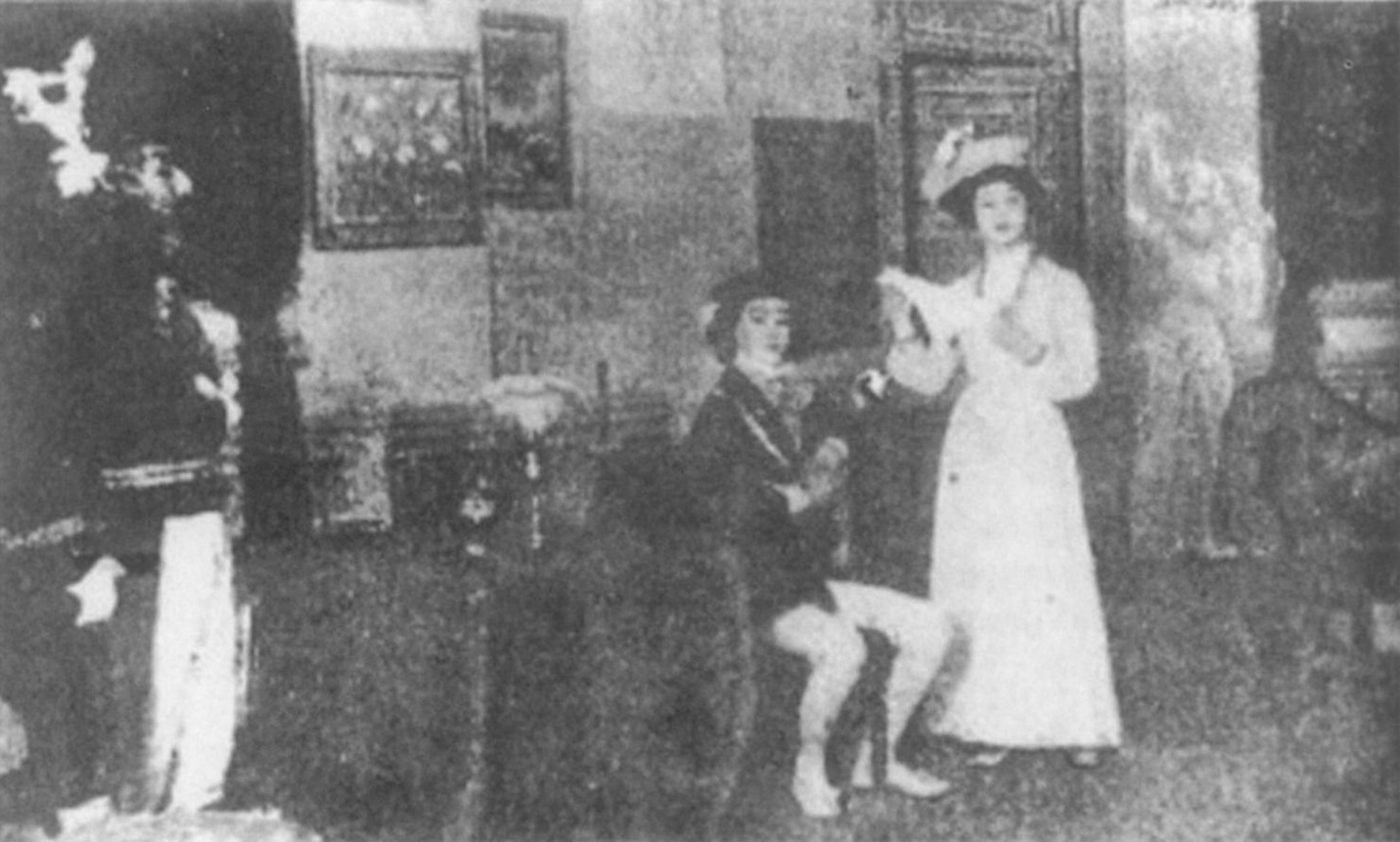
The Spring Willow Society performing Victorien Sardou's La Tosca (1909), with Lu Jingruo and Ouyang Yuqian in the main roles

Through 1909, Spring Willow continued to perform, albeit under the name Shenyou Society. Among these performances were several one-act plays. Another was Hot Tears (later retitled Hot Blood), based on a 1907 Japanese-language adaptation of Victorien Sardou's La Tosca (1887) by Taguchi Kitukei. This story was selected due to its limited cast size and revolutionary themes, which were amplified through dialogue that predicted the end of tyranny. In his memoirs, Ouyang Yuqian recalled that Hot Blood had been a more mature drama than Black Slave's Cry to Heaven, being more adherent to its script and better integrating its scenes into a cohesive whole.

=== Shanghai ===
By 1910, many members of the Spring Willow Society had returned to China. Some left theatre, while others continued to act. In 1912, several established a civilized drama troupe in Shanghai named the New Drama Comrades Association; it continued to use the Spring Willow Theater bannerhead while in Shanghai. Under Lu Jingruo, the troupe frequently toured. As with other contemporary Chinese theatrical troupes, most of the stories produced by Spring Willow were written only as scenarios that were fleshed out by actors through improvisation. However, some stories – such as Black Slave's Cry to Heaven – did include scripts and fully written dialogue. The troupe's main actors were all men, who played both male and female characters.

The New Drama Comrades produced more than eighty stories through 1915, with a third of them being original compositions; another third were translated from European dramas, while the remainder were based on traditional Chinese stories. Its most commonly performed stories were Hot Blood, Family Grudges, and Double-Edged Sword, though its repertoire also included stories such as William Shakespeare's Othello, adapted as The Traitor from a Japanese translation by Kawakami Otojirō. With such an emphasis on European stories and styles, the troupe had little success with contemporary audiences, and its members had to support their activities by working at an antiques shop. It stopped its activities shortly after Lu Jingruo's death in 1915.

== Impact ==
Liu writes that The Traitor was probably the first full-length production of a Shakespearean play in China, as earlier performances had been adapted from Lin Shu's translation of Charles and Mary Lamb's Tales from Shakespeare, a collection of abridged retellings. One Hundred New Drama Plays, a 1919 anthology of civilized dramas, dedicated most of its "New Western Plays" to works by the Spring Willow Theatre. Black Slave's Cry to Heaven has been canonized as the first Western-style Chinese drama (huaju), gaining this recognition based on a history of modern Chinese drama prepared in 1957 by dramatists including Tian Han and Ouyang Yuqian. (Note: Liu (2013, p. 9) writes that this was a calculated decision, as it "erased the contested hybridity of spoken theatre's birth cycle" while simultaneously emphasizing a work with a nationalistic message. Earlier performances by European expatriate communities are recorded, but had little effect on the Chinese community (Yu 2009, p. 2) Meanwhile, several Chinese dramatists had attempted to implement reform through the incorporation of elements of western dramaturgy into Peking opera, such as Wang Xiaonong in his Reap What You Sow (1904) (Qi 2018, p. 14) The literature scholar Shouhua Qi writes that "none of the early drama reform endeavours ... were as self-conscious, extensive, and indeed revolutionary as those mounted by the young students of the Spring Willow Society in 1907" (Qi 2018, p. 14).) The centenary of Spring Willow's performance of Black Slave's Cry to Heaven was commemorated with Search for Spring Willow Society (2007), a performance by the Beijing-based Tufeng Drama Troupe that imagined and dramatized the troupe's experiences.

== Works cited ==
- Liu Ping (刘平) (2011). 春柳社：唱响中国话剧第一声 [The Spring Willow Society: The First Voice of the Chinese Modern Drama]. Art Exchange. Vol. 4. Archived from the original on 21 January 2025.
- Liu, Siyuan (2006). "The Impact of Shinpa on Early Chinese Huaju". Asian Theatre Journal. 23 (2): 342–355. doi:10.1353/atj.2006.0024. JSTOR 4137058.
- Liu, Siyuan (2007). "Adaptation as Appropriation: Staging Western Drama in the First Western-Style Theatres in Japan and China". Theatre Journal. 59 (3): 411–429. doi:10.1353/tj.2007.0159. JSTOR 25070065.
- Liu, Siyuan (2010). "Chunliu She". In Kennedy, Dennis (ed.). The Companion to Theatre and Performance. doi:10.1093/acref/9780199574193.001.0001. ISBN 978-0-19-172791-7.
- Liu, Siyuan (2013). Performing Hybridity in Colonial-Modern China. New York: Palgrave Macmillan. ISBN 978-1-137-30611-1.
- Ouyang, Yuqian (1984). 回忆春柳 [Reminiscences of the Spring Willow Society]. 欧阳予倩戏剧论文集 [Ouyang Yuqian's Collected Essays on Drama] (in Chinese). Shanghai: Shanghai Wenyi Chubanshe. pp. 142–174.
- Qi, Shouhua (2018). Adapting Western Classics for the Chinese Stage. London and New York: Routledge. ISBN 978-1-315-44616-5.
- Yu, Shiao-Ling (2009). "'Cry to Heaven': A Play to Celebrate One Hundred Years of Chinese Spoken Drama by Nick Rongjun Yu". Asian Theatre Journal. 26 (1): 1–53. doi:10.1353/atj.0.0036. JSTOR 20638798.
