= Huaju =

Chinese drama style

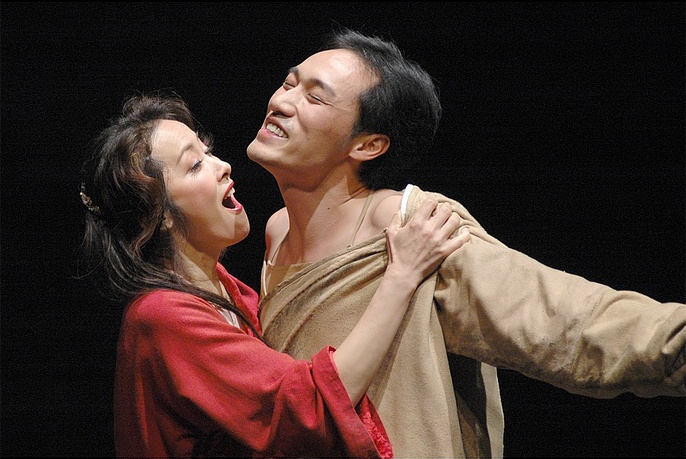
A 2007 performance of Cao Yu's The Wilderness (1932)

Huaju (simplified Chinese: 话剧; traditional Chinese: 話劇; pinyin: Huàjù; lit. 'word drama'), translated variously as spoken drama, modern spoken drama, or modern Chinese drama, is a form of spoken-word drama found through the Sinophone world. Characterized by naturalistic dialogue as well as realistic make-up, costumes, sets, and lighting, and clear divisions between acts and scenes, it emerged in the 1920s through the application of realist philosophy to the earlier civilized drama. Early proponents, such as Ouyang Yuqian, Hong Shen, Tian Han, and Cao Yu, drew on the thought of Henrik Ibsen, Anton Chekhov, and Maksim Gorky to create a style of drama suited for the modern age. It remained highly formalized, despite efforts to introduce elements of Chinese opera, through the 1960s. Banned in China during the Cultural Revolution, reforms introduced since the 1970s have allowed the rise of avant-garde and hybrid forms. Huaju is also attested in Taiwan and Hong Kong, where it has evolved separately since the end of the Chinese Civil War.

Popular reception of huaju has waxed and waned over time, with early works limited to urban audiences and more recent ones finding greater acceptance as audiences have become increasingly exposed to Western culture. Themes have varied, with early works noted for their political content and their emphasis on gender roles. Translation of huaju began in the 1930s, and has become increasingly common since the 1980s.

== Definition and influences ==
Huaju is a form of spoken-word drama. It is characterized by realistic make-up, costumes, sets, and lighting, as well as clear divisions between acts and scenes. Works often employ a proscenium stage, adapted from Western traditions. Depending on location, huaju may use various languages, with Cantonese-language performances common in Hong Kong.

Influences on huaju have varied. Early forms of spoken-word drama, such as the civilized drama genre prominent in Shanghai in the 1910s, built upon the Chinese opera, early spoken-word forms, and European dramatic conventions through the Japanese shinpa. The development of the purely spoken-word huaju in the 1920s built on the styles established by the civilized drama while introducing higher levels of realist philosophy, drawing heavily from the teachings of playwrights such as Henrik Ibsen, Anton Chekhov, and Maksim Gorky, as well as theorists such as Konstantin Stanislavski. At times, specific performances have again drawn on traditional opera, or from the approaches offered by dramatists such as Bertolt Brecht.

== History ==
=== Rise ===
Traditionally, Chinese theatre has placed great emphasis on sung performances, with highly stylized acting prominent in the Peking and Cantonese operas. Western-style spoken-word dramas were introduced in the early 1900s, with the Tokyo-based Spring Willow Society performing Black Slave's Cry to Heaven – considered one of China's first Western-style theatrical performances – in 1907. Upon their returns to China, alumni from this troupe established the civilized drama genre, which blended spoken-word dialogue with operatic performances while incorporating realistic set design. Spoken drama was generally viewed as a marginal cultural activity.

Towards the 1920s, interest in the civilized drama began to wane, and critics began decrying the genre as overacting. Amateur troupes, meanwhile, sought to move away from the highly commercialized civilized drama genre. Subscribing to the realist philosophy taught by Ibsen and following the New Culture Movement's call for reform, these troupes put greater emphasis on naturalistic performances. Many of these early works were direct translations of works by Western playwrights. Audiences for these performances, which occurred mostly in urban cultural centres such as Shanghai, were limited.

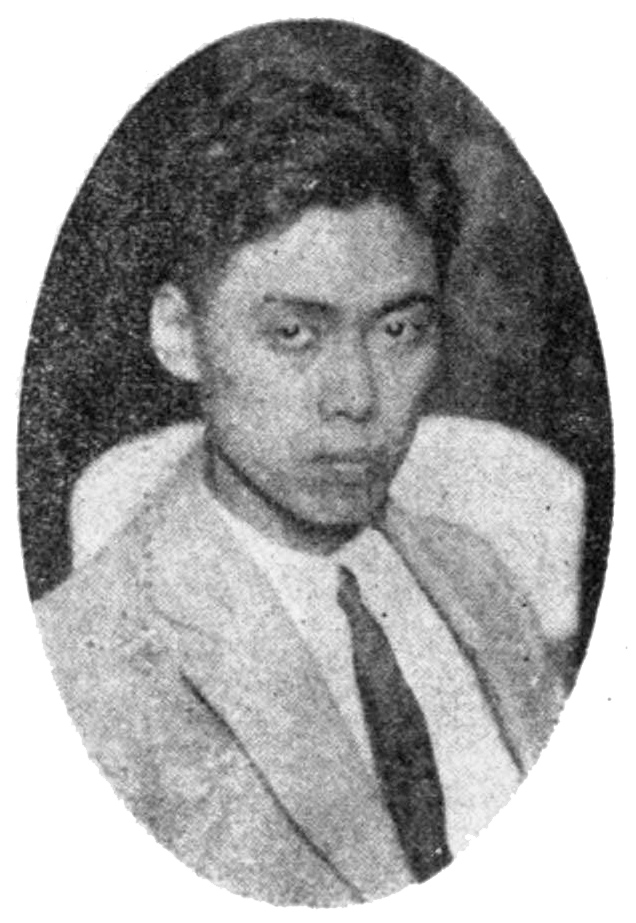
The dramatist Tian Han introduced the word huaju in 1927.

The word huaju was introduced in 1927 by the dramatist Tian Han, at which time it was used to describe works that relied exclusively on realistic spoken-word dialogue. Although most troupes embraced high levels of realism, some – such as the national theatre movement under Yu Shangyuan – sought to maintain hybridity in stage performances and thereby retain elements of traditional Chinese culture. Critics of this movement, most of whom were students, decried it as capitulating to feudal norms, and it was quashed by the end of the decade.

The 1930s saw the expansion of huaju through further Westernization, as well as access to broader audiences. Through the 1930s and 1940s, a variety of playwrights penned new works to be performed as spoken-word dramas. These included Ouyang Yuqian, Hong Shen, Tian Han, and Cao Yu; the Encyclopaedia Britannica describes Cao's Thunderstorm (1933), a tragedy in four acts, as a high point in performance and story.

During the Second Sino-Japanese War, the popularity of spoken drama quickly increased, in part due to its simplicity and flexibility. The form became a major type of cultural work for expressing resistance to the invasion by Japan. Huaju troupes travelled to rural areas to promote resistance to Japanese forces; some of these were supported by the government, with the Guo Moruo–headed Third Section providing support to ten Anti-Japanese Drama Companies.

=== After the Chinese Civil War ===
==== In China ====
Following the establishment of the People's Republic of China in 1949, the Chinese Communist Party (CCP) initiated efforts to reform drama, sponsoring a series of "revolutionary and politically correct" huaju performances as well as the development of a ballet-inspired dance drama genre known as wuju. Genres prominent in this period included the slice of life, as represented by Lao She's Teahouse (1957), and the historical drama. Efforts by civilized drama writers such as Xu Banmei to again reintegrate traditional operatic forms into huaju, under the name tongsu huaju (popular spoken drama), gained some traction in the late 1950s, but were ultimately futile.

Performances of huaju continued through the 1960s, with Tian defining the genre in 1957 as "a new dramatic form imported from Europe together with capitalist civilization half a century ago, or created with strong foreign influences". By this point, close relations between China and the United Soviet Socialist Republic had allowed the introduction of Stanislavski's system of acting into Chinese drama, albeit with some modifications; other influences came from the dramaturgy of Chekhov and Gorky. Such emphasis on realism was not universally accepted, with the film director and dramatist Huang Zuolin calling for a return to traditional conventions as well as the theatrical ideals of Brecht.

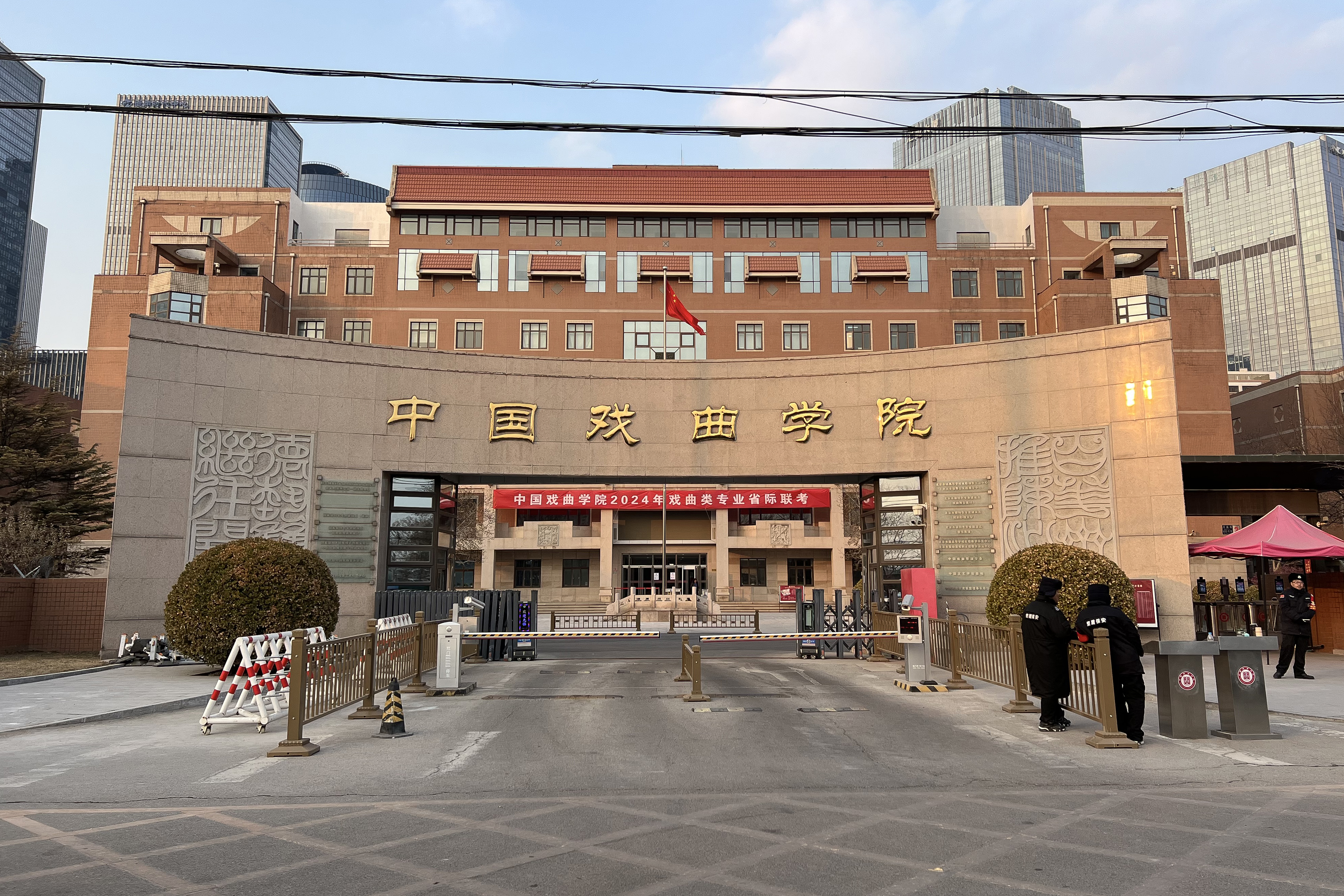
The National Academy of Chinese Theatre Arts in Beijing, established in 1951

During the Cultural Revolution that began in 1966, huaju was branded a "poisonous weed" and banned. In the subsequent decade, most dramatic performances were Peking operas made into "model dramas" that advanced the CCP's propagandic interests. Although some huaju were performed by the mid-1970s, they were constrained by the government-mandated models. Huaju returned after the revolution, with many early performances condemning the political persecution that had been experienced. Zong Fuxian's In a Land of Silence (1978), for instance, explored the last months of the revolution. Several dramatists, such as Xie Min through his Why Did I Die?, used the post-Revolution reforms to advance avant-garde theatre. Others, such Sun Huizhu and Fei Chunfang, incorporated elements of Chinese opera into their performances.

Huaju has remained a dominant dramatic form in Chinese theatre. Since the 1990s, it has expanded to become a "total performance event". At the same time, younger audiences exposed to Western thought have allowed the genre to increase in prominence. Influences from foreign forms of theatre have accelerated, a situation that may be attributed in part due to direct exposure to foreign playwrights; for instance, Arthur Miller directed a Chinese-language production of his Death of a Salesman (1949) in 1983.

==== In Taiwan ====
The conclusion of the Chinese Civil War and establishment of the People's Republic of China in 1949 was followed by the exodus of some million and a half refugees across the Taiwan Strait. This brought significant changes to Taiwan, where modern drama – introduced by the Japanese during their rule in the 1910s – had not found much of a following. The Kuomintang government initially used huaju for propaganda, though it had diversified by the 1960s under the guidance of dramatists such as Li Man-kuei and her Committee on Spoken Drama Appreciation. Practices expanded through the 1980s, with Chin Shih-chieh advancing a model that integrated traditional opera.

==== In Hong Kong ====
Although under British influence English-language drama had long been performed in Hong Kong, as with Taiwan, the most popular form of theatre among Chinese audiences through the early 20th century was traditional. Huaju gained some traction in the 1930s, with the years before the Japanese occupation seeing several patriotic works. The influx of refugees following the Chinese Civil War, again as in Taiwan, brought several playwrights. Through the 1950s, playwrights such as Hu Chun-bin, Hsiung Shih-I, and Lai Kok-bun produced huaju in Cantonese. Since the 1960s, students of universities such as the Hong Kong Academy for Performing Arts (established 1985) have been primary drivers of huaju production.

== Themes ==
=== Politics ===
Politics has been a common theme in huaju from its inception. Works from the Second Sino-Japanese War tended to condemn the Japanese invasion, though some – such as Xia Yan's Sai Jinhua (1936), adapted from the life of the eponymous woman – condemned the Kuomintang government for failing to stop Japan's imperial ambitions. Beginning in the 1950s, works of huaju were brought in-line with the CCP's political mission, and during the Cultural Revolution CCP propaganda was paramount in mainland productions.

Since reform, some mainland Chinese playwrights have continued to produce dramas with pro-Party messages. Others have distanced themselves from the CCP, with Gao Xingjian producing works such as Alarm Signal (1982), which made no mention of the party, and The Other Shore (1986), which challenged the collectivist philosophy of contemporary China. (Note: Gao later left China after his works were condemned as anti-socialist (MacKerras 2008, p. 6).) Numerous plays critical of the CCP have been banned, though there has been a general trend towards a more laissez-faire approach since the 1990s.

=== Gender ===
Social reform has been another common theme in huaju, building on the view – advocated, among others, by Liang Qichao – that such reform is impossible without first being propagated through popular literature. Numerous works have dealt with the role of women in China, seeking to improve their status in society. Some, such as Hu Shih's The Greatest Event in Her Life (1919), advocated for women to choose their own spouse, and others – such as Guo Moruo's Three Rebellious Women (1925) – depicted them as actively challenging the dominant system. Ouyang Yuqian's Pan Jinlian (1926) adapted the fictional villainess of Water Margin into a modern woman outspoken against the double standards of love and promiscuity. During the late 1930s, women's rights became intertwined with political action against the Japanese, with archetypes such as women intellectuals and warriors becoming commonplace. In the 1950s, the CCP prohibited the performance of plays that promoted arranged marriages, advocating instead works that emphasized gender equality.

== Translation ==
English-language translations of Chinese drama have tended to prioritize traditional opera. Works of huaju have been translated since the 1930s, with Cao Yu's Thunderstorm serialized in the Shanghai-based T'ien Xia Monthly (1936–1937) and the Commercial Press publishing an anthology of six dramas titled Modern Chinese Drama (1941). The Beijing-based Foreign Languages Press has published several translated dramas since its establishment in the 1950s. Since the 1980s, several anthologies of huaju have been published in English, including Twentieth-Century Chinese Dramas: An Anthology (1983) and The Oxford Anthology of Contemporary Drama (1997).

== Notable dramatists ==
- Cao Yu
- Chin Shih-chieh
- Gao Xingjian
- Guo Moruo
- Hong Shen
- Hsiung Shih-I
- Lao She
- Ouyang Yuqian
- Tian Han
- Xia Yan
- Xiong Foxi
- Yu Shangyuan
- Yuan Changying

== Works cited ==
- "Huaju". Encyclopaedia Britannica. 1 July 2005. Archived from the original on 6 September 2015.
- Hung, Chang-Tai (1989). "Female Symbols of Resistance in Chinese Wartime Spoken Drama". Modern China. 15 (2): 149–177. doi:10.1177/009770048901500202. JSTOR 189364.
- Hung, Chang-tai (1994). War and Popular Culture: Resistance in Modern China, 1937-1945. Berkeley: University of California Press. ISBN 978-0-520-35486-9.
- Jia, Binwu (2022). "Zheng Zhegu and Performances in Early Chinese Film". Journal of Chinese Film Studies. 2 (2): 261–276. doi:10.1515/jcfs-2022-0002.
- Liu, Siyuan (2003). "Huajü (Hua Chü)". In Kennedy, Dennis (ed.). The Oxford Encyclopedia of Theatre and Performance. doi:10.1093/acref/9780198601746.001.0001. ISBN 978-0-19-860174-6.
- Liu, Siyuan (2003). "Wenming Xi (Wen Ming Hsi)". In Kennedy, Dennis (ed.). The Oxford Encyclopedia of Theatre and Performance. doi:10.1093/acref/9780198601746.001.0001. ISBN 978-0-19-860174-6.
- Liu, Siyuan; Wetmore, Kevin J. (2009). "Modern Chinese Drama in English: A Selective Bibliography". Asian Theatre Journal. 26 (2): 320–351. doi:10.1353/atj.0.0043. JSTOR 20638826.
- Liu, Siyuan (2017). "'Spoken Drama (Huaju) with a Strong Chinese Flavour': The Resurrection and Demise of Popular Spoken Drama (Tongsu Huaju) in Shanghai in the 1950s and Early 1960s". Theatre Research International. 42 (3): 265–285. doi:10.1017/S030788331700058X.
- Liu, Siyuan (2023). "The "Deep Realism" of Style: From Michel Saint-Denis to Huang Zuolin". In Nakamura, Jessica; Saltzman-Li, Katherine (eds.). Realisms in East Asian Performance. University of Michigan Press. pp. 233–251. doi:10.3998/mpub.12254299. ISBN 978-0-472-07642-0. JSTOR 10.3998/mpub.12254299.18.
- MacKerras, Colin (2008). "Tradition, Change, and Continuity in Chinese Theatre in the Last Hundred Years: In Commemoration of the Spoken Drama Centenary". Asian Theatre Journal. 25 (1): 1–23. doi:10.1353/atj.2008.0012. JSTOR 27568433.
- Zhong, Dafeng; Zhang, Zhen; Zhang, Yingjin (1997). "From Wenmingxi (Civilized Play) to Yingxi (Shadowplay): The Foundation of Shanghai Film Industry in the 1920s". Asian Cinema. 9 (1): 46–64. doi:10.1386/ac.9.1.46_1.
