= Jiao Juyin =

Jiao Juyin (Chinese: 焦菊隐; 11 December 1905 – 28 February 1975) was a Chinese director, translator, and theater theorist. He was born in Tianjin on December 11, 1905. His original name was Jiao Chengzhi (焦承志), and also used several pen names such as Juying 居颖, Juyin 居尹 and Liangchou 亮俦. He used Juying (菊影) as stage name, and later changed it into Juyin 菊隐.

== Biography ==
Jiao was very poor when he was young, and had to do a lot of work while to maintain studying. At the early 1920th, he organised a literary society named the "Green Waves Society". In 1928 he and Xiong Foxi organized a performance of The Cricket, that offended a warlord, made him wanted. In 1930, he took part in the founding of the Traditional Opera College of Beiping, later became the first principal of it, and implemented a series of reforms. In the autumn of 1935, he went to study in France, observed the performance of various schools of Western Theater. In 1938 he received a Ph.D. from the University of Paris, and returned to China.

He worked in Guilin until 1941. During this time he once directed Cao Yu's Thunderstorm. Later he took part in the reform of Guangxi opera with Ouyang Yuqian. In 1947, he founded the Beiping art library. In 1950, he directed Lao She's Dragon Beard Ditch for Beijing People's Art Theatre. In 1952, Jiao became the first vice-president of Beijing People's Art Theatre. He died on February 28, 1975, in Beijing because of cancer.
