= Tian Dawei =

Chinese translator

- 田大畏
- Born: August 1931; Beijing, China
- Died: June 12, 2013 (aged 81); China
- Education: North China University of Technology
- Occupation: Translator
- Relatives: Tian Han (father); An E (mother)
- Writing career
- Language: Chinese, Russian
- Period: 1950–2000
- Genre: Novel
- Notable work: The Gulag Archipelago

Tian Dawei (Chinese: 田大畏; pinyin: Tián Dàwèi; August 1931 – 12 June 2013) was a Chinese translator and official. He served as vice president of the National Library of China, and was an official in the Ministry of Culture of the People's Republic of China.

Tian was among the first in China who translated some works of Aleksandr Solzhenitsyn into Chinese.

== Biography ==
Tian was born in a highly educated family, in 1931, in Beijing, the son of An E (安娥), a poet and translator, and Tian Han, a playwright who wrote the lyrics for March of the Volunteers in 1934.

In 1936, Tian studied at a primary school in Baoding, Hebei. In 1937, during the Second Sino-Japanese War, Tian fled to Shaanxi.

From 1940 to 1946, Tian studied at Yucai School (育才学校) in Hechuan County, Chongqing.

In June 1946, Tian returned to Beijing and studied at Beijing No. 4 High School.

Tian attended Beifang University (北方大学) from December 1946 to August 1948. Tian entered the North China University of Technology in August 1948, majoring in the Russian language.

After graduating in January 1949 he was appointed an officer to the Ministry of Culture of the People's Republic of China, he retired in February 1994.

Tian joined the Chinese Communist Party in 1953.

Tian died at Beijing Friendship Hospital (北京友谊医院), in Beijing, on June 12, 2013.

== Works ==
- The Gulag Archipelago (Aleksandr Solzhenitsyn) (古拉格群岛)
- In the First Circle (Aleksandr Solzhenitsyn) (第一圈)
- Dead Souls (Nikolai Gogol) (死魂灵)
- Collected Plays of Turgenev (Ivan Turgenev) (屠格涅夫戏剧集)
- (Ivan Turgenev) (绳在细处断)

== Awards ==
- Chinese Translation Association - Competent Translator (2004)
- Russian Writers Association - Gorky Literature Prize (2006)
