= Yama Zhao =

Yama Zhao (Chinese: 趙閻王; pinyin: Zhào Yánwáng; Wade–Giles: Chao Yen-wang) is a play written by Hong Shen in 1922. It was first produced in Shanghai in February 1923, and Hong played the title role. The play strongly opposed the brutal warfare that plagued China at the time, which is now known as the Warlord Era. The play was well received and established Hong Shen's reputation as a playwright.

== Inception ==
Hong got the inspiration of Yama Zhao in the spring of 1922, shortly after the first battle between two warlords Zhang Zuolin and Wu Peifu. Hong was on a train to northern China when he overheard some soldiers' conversation. They mentioned that Wu's army buried many of Zhang's soldiers alive after winning the battle in order to take possession of their enemies' belongings. This unnerving conversation eventually led Hong to dramatize this incident in Yama Zhao.

== Plot ==
Set in the Warlord Era, the play tells the tragic story of Zhao Da, a body guard to a commander of a battalion. Zhao is nicknamed Yama Zhao, meaning "Zhao, the king of Hell," due to his valor and experience on the battlefield. The commander has not paid members of the entire battalion for five months. Instead, he has pocketed the soldier's salaries and gambled away some of them. Under such circumstance, Zhao, disappointed by his unrewarded service and incited by his fellow soldier Old Li, takes hold of the payroll money and fled into a nearby jungle. He then loses his way and experiences a series of hallucinations before being shot dead by his pursuers. In the end, Li buries Zhao after the rest of the pursuing squad has returned. Li retrieves the money that Zhao has hidden around his waist and flees into the jungle.

According to David Y. Chen, the nine scenes of the play can be roughly divided into three parts: "the first scene exposes [Zhao Da]'s struggle between duty and wealth which ends in his escape with his booty. The second scene begins with his entering the forest. From this point on, the rest of the play closely resembles the forest section of The Emperor Jones, only in the illusions the past experiences of the Negro convicts are changed for those of the Chinese soldier."

== Plagiarism controversy ==
Hong's Yama Zhao bears clear a resemblance to Eugene O'Neill's The Emperor Jones by "[borrowing] from its American prototypes the money motif, the structure of plot, the scene division, and the psychological treatment of hallucinations in a forest setting." Due to the similarities between Yama Zhao and The Emperor Jones, Hong faced charges of plagiarism from the Chinese literati when his play premiered in Shanghai in 1923. Hong later addressed the controversy in a 1933 article entitled "O'Neill and Hong Shen: An Imaginary Conversation (Ouni’er yu Hong Shen: yidu xiangxiang de duihua)."
