= Tian Han =

Chinese playwright and writer (1898–1968)

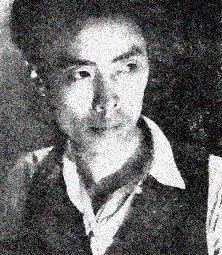
- Tian in 1930
- Born: 12 March 1898; Guoyuan, Hunan, Qing China
- Died: 10 December 1968 (aged 70); Beijing, China
- Education: Tokyo Higher Normal School
- Occupations: Playwright, novelist, poet
- Spouses: Yi Shuyu (m. 1920–1925) Huang Dalin (m. 1927–1929) Lin Weizhong (m. 1930–1946) An E (m. 1930–1968)
- Children: Tian Dawei
- Writing career
- Pen name: Tián Shòuchāng, Bóhóng, Chén Yú, Shùrén, Hànxiān, etc.
- Language: Chinese
- Period: 1920–1968
- Genres: Novel, poem, drama
- Notable work: March of the Volunteers

Tian Han
- Traditional Chinese: 田漢
- Simplified Chinese: 田汉
Transcriptions
Standard Mandarin
- Hanyu Pinyin: Tián Hàn
- Gwoyeu Romatzyh: Tyan Hann
- Wade–Giles: T‘ien^{2} Han^{4}

Courtesy name
- Traditional Chinese: 壽昌
- Simplified Chinese: 寿昌
Transcriptions
Standard Mandarin
- Hanyu Pinyin: Shòuchāng
- Gwoyeu Romatzyh: Showchang
- Wade–Giles: Shou^{4}-ch‘ang^{1}

Tian Han (田漢; simplified 田汉; 12 March 1898 – 10 December 1968), formerly romanized as T'ien Han, was a Chinese drama activist, playwright, a leader of revolutionary music and films, as well as a translator and poet. He emerged at the time of the New Culture Movement of the early 20th century and continued to be active until the Cultural Revolution, when he was denounced and jailed for two years until his death, before being "posthumously rehabilitated" by the Chinese authorities in 1979. He is considered by drama historians as one of the three founders of Chinese spoken drama, together with Ouyang Yuqian and Hong Shen. His most famous legacy may be the lyrics he wrote for "March of the Volunteers" in 1934, which were later adopted as the national anthem of the People's Republic of China.

== Early life and education ==
Tian was born Tian Shouchang on 12 March 1898 in Maoping Village in Changsha County, Hunan, in what is now Tian Han Village in Guoyuan Town, Changsha County. His family was poor, and after his father died when he was nine, his mother raised three sons on her own. She told the boys stories from operas, which the Hunan Daily describes as his first lessons in drama, and as a small child he also followed local shadow plays.

In 1910, Tian went to Changsha to attend a modern school. In 1911, he entered the Xiuye School, where the educator Xu Teli taught, and in 1912, he joined the first class of the Changsha County Normal School, which Xu had founded. In the second half of 1911, inspired by the Xinhai Revolution, he changed his name from Shouchang to Han. At the age of 13, he wrote his first play, the short opera Xin jiaozi (A New Lesson for the Son), based on the traditional opera Sanniang jiaozi. It was published in the Changsha Daily. According to the drama historian Song Baozhen, he wrote it to win his mother's support for joining the revolution. He continued to write librettos for traditional opera as a teenager.

In 1916, with the financial support of his maternal uncle Yi Meichen, a former member of the Tongmenghui, Tian went to study in Japan, where he stayed until 1922. He married Yi's daughter, his cousin Yi Shuyu. In Japan, he developed a lasting interest in modern drama and film, and he set himself the goal of becoming "China's Ibsen". In 1919, under the influence of the May Fourth Movement, he helped to organize the Young China Association. He was also a co-founder, with Guo Moruo and others, of the Creation Society, which promoted romanticism in literature. In 1921, he translated Oscar Wilde's Salomé into Chinese.

== Career ==
=== Shanghai and the Southern Society ===
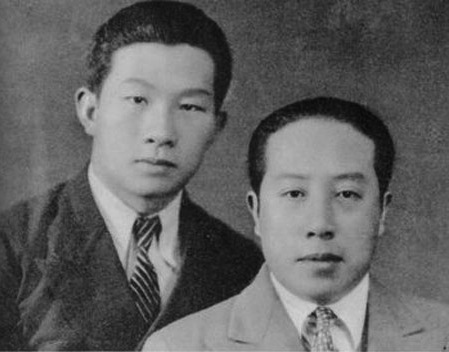
Tian Han (right) and Nie Er (left), the lyricist and composer of "March of the Volunteers", in Shanghai in 1933

Tian returned to China with his wife in 1922. In 1924, they founded the semimonthly magazine Nanguo (Southern China) in Shanghai, which closed for lack of funds. In 1926, he founded the Southern Film Society, which later became the Southern Society (Nanguo she). He and his colleagues promoted the slogan "Go to the people" and planned a film of that name. His screenplay Spring Dream by the Lake was filmed in 1927. During the 1920s, he also called for a "new national drama", arguing that traditional opera could be reformed into a modern national theatre.

In 1927, Tian coined huaju (spoken drama) as an alternative to xinju (new plays). Tian's coinage was intended to emphasize the medium's non-musical nature and use of dialogue.

In 1927, Tian taught in the literature department of Shanghai Art University. With Ouyang Yuqian, Tang Huaiqiu and Gao Baisui, he organized performances by a group that he called the "Fish and Dragon Society", in which established artists such as Ouyang were the "dragons" and university students were the "fish". For lack of money, the group performed in a living room that held 50 or 60 people. In 1928, he founded the Southern College of Art. In 1928 and 1929, the Southern Society staged plays in Shanghai, Nanjing, Guangzhou, Hangzhou and Wuxi. Tian wrote and directed most of its plays, including the one-act Night Talk in Suzhou and the multi-act Death of a Noted Actor. Encyclopædia Britannica describes his one-act plays of the late 1920s, including Tragedy on the Lakeshore (1928) and Death of a Famous Actor (1929), as blending melodrama with critical realism.

=== Left-wing movement ===
In the winter of 1929, at the invitation of Jiang Guangci, Tian took part in preparations for the League of Left-Wing Writers. In February 1930, he helped Lu Xun and others to found the China Freedom Movement League, and he was elected to its executive committee. In April 1930, he published "Our Self-Criticism", in which he announced his turn towards left-wing literature. The Nationalist government closed the Southern Society in September 1930. In January 1931, he was elected to the executive committee of the League of Left-Wing Dramatists, whose work he effectively led. In the spring of 1932, he joined the Chinese Communist Party, and Qu Qiubai administered his oath of admission.

Tian's plays became more openly political after he joined the party. The Rainy Season (1931) depicted the class struggle of factory workers, and The Moonlight Sonata (1932) dealt with a strike by bus workers. Between 1931 and 1934, he also wrote plays with strong anti-Japanese themes, including Luan zhong and Storm on the Yangtze (1934). He wrote the libretto for Storm on the Yangtze, and Nie Er composed its music. In the 1930s, he also wrote screenplays.

=== "March of the Volunteers" ===
In late 1934, Tian began writing the story of the film Sons and Daughters in a Time of Storm and provided the poem that became its theme song, "March of the Volunteers". It was his last collaboration with Nie Er, who set it to music. Tian was arrested and imprisoned in Shanghai in 1935. He is said to have written the lyrics on the paper of a cigarette packet. Nie Er finished the score in April 1935, and he drowned in Japan in July of that year. Tian was released from prison in July 1935. The song became popular, and its marching rhythm helped to rally the country when war with Japan broke out in July 1937.

=== Second Sino-Japanese War ===
During the Second Sino-Japanese War, Tian held posts in wartime mobilization, wrote about a dozen opera librettos to rouse the public, and led troupes that toured the areas behind the front lines. After the formation of the Second United Front, he became head of the Sixth Section of the Third Department of the Political Department, which was responsible for artistic propaganda. In this role, he organized campaigns that brought lectures, music, photography and cartoon exhibitions, cinema and information on public health and nutrition to the streets in order to reach new audiences.

In Wuhan, Tian organized dozens of performing groups and large singing campaigns, and he wrote dozens of song lyrics. After the Chinese victory at the Battle of Taierzhuang in April 1938, he helped to organize a torchlight parade in Wuhan, and the song "Hongbo qu", with his lyrics and music by Zhang Shu, was first performed on 9 April 1938. He invited Hong Shen to head the drama section, and he sent troupes to perform for soldiers at the Taierzhuang front. Later in the war, Tian worked in Guilin, where he argued that China needed "a cultural army" as well as armed forces.

=== People's Republic of China ===
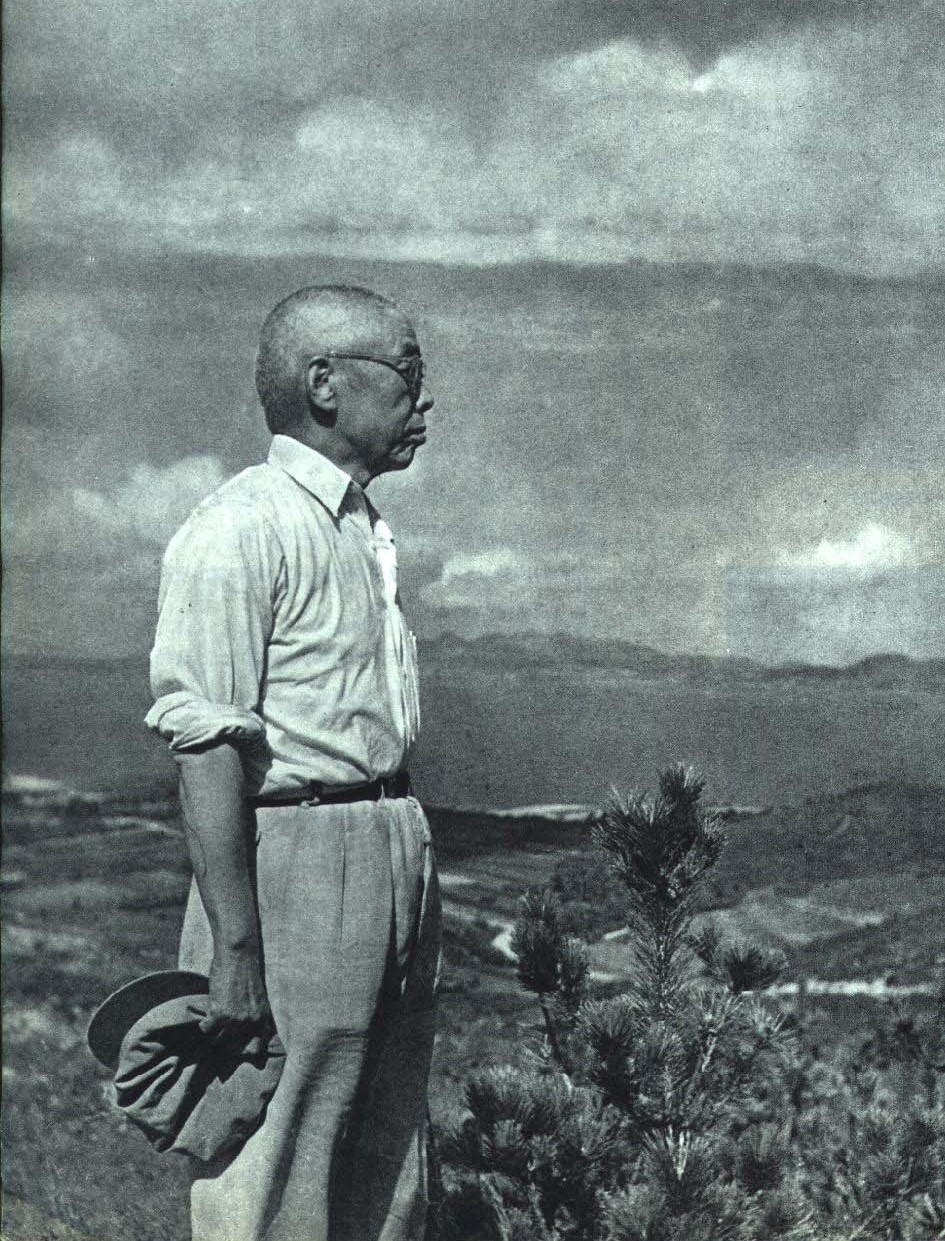
Tian in 1964

In 1948, the Communist Party sent Tian back to Beiping to persuade cultural figures to remain in the city. On 31 January 1949, he entered Beiping with the People's Liberation Army. In June 1949, he joined the preparatory meeting of the Chinese People's Political Consultative Conference (CPPCC), and he was a member of its sixth group, which drafted proposals for the national flag, emblem and anthem. On 27 September 1949, the first plenary session of the CPPCC adopted "March of the Volunteers" as the provisional national anthem.

In December 1949, Tian was appointed director of the Ministry of Culture's Opera Reform Bureau, and in 1951, he became director of its Arts Bureau. He was also president of the Experimental School of Traditional Opera in Beijing. In 1953, he was elected chairman of the Chinese Dramatists Association, and he also served as a vice-chairman of the China Federation of Literary and Art Circles.

In 1953, on the instructions of Zhou Enlai, the Chinese Dramatists Association bought Tian a courtyard house at No. 9 Xiguan Hutong in Beijing, where he lived with his family for 15 years. There, he wrote or adapted works including The White Snake, The Western Chamber, Guan Hanqing and Xie Yaohuan. Guan Hanqing, a spoken drama about the Yuan dynasty playwright Guan Hanqing, was staged by the Beijing People's Art Theatre in 1958. Encyclopædia Britannica states that Xie Yaohuan (1961) is often considered his finest drama. Although he championed Western-style spoken drama, he wrote many works on historical themes. In his later years, he also rewrote episodes from Water Margin about Wu Song and Pan Jinlian in several performance genres.

== Cultural Revolution ==
By 1964, Xie Yaohuan was being attacked as a veiled criticism of Mao Zedong. That year, the Chinese Dramatists Association held a meeting to criticize Tian, at which he made a self-criticism of the play, saying that the idea of "pleading on behalf of the people" had found its way into it despite his intentions. He was then kept under constant surveillance. Criticism of Xie Yaohuan, together with two other historical plays, Hai Rui Dismissed from Office by Wu Han and Li Huiniang by Meng Chao, formed the opening salvos of the Cultural Revolution. On 1 February 1966, the People's Daily denounced the play in an article titled "Tian Han's Xie Yaohuan Is a Big Poisonous Weed".

In July 1966, Tian was sent to a training class at the Institute of Socialism, and in August, he was paraded in public, subjected to struggle sessions and beaten, before being allowed to return home for a time. On the night of 4 December 1966, rebels seized him at his home in Xiguan Hutong, and he said goodbye to An E and his mother before he was taken away. For a few months, his family could send him food and clothing, but after that, all contact was cut off. He was persecuted by the Gang of Four and held as a "counter-revolutionary" in a prison run by Kang Sheng. He was held without his medicines, and he suffered two years of physical and mental mistreatment.

=== Death ===
Tian suffered from diabetes, and his high blood pressure and heart disease grew worse in detention. He was eventually sent to the 301 Hospital in Beijing, where his hospital and cremation records gave his name as "Li Wu". According to Su Shuyang, the hospital staff knew him only as a "reactionary authority". He died on 10 December 1968, at the age of 70, but his family was not told of his death. His ashes were not claimed, and they were scattered. His mother, Yi Keqin, waited every day for news of him, and she died in December 1971 at the age of 101.

In May 1975, the Central Special Case Group told Tian's family at their home that he had died in 1968, and it declared him a "traitor" and expelled him from the party permanently. About 100,000 of his books, together with his letters and works of art, were confiscated, and some of them were burned.

== Rehabilitation ==
After the end of the Cultural Revolution, Tian and Xie Yaohuan were posthumously rehabilitated in 1979. His family had no photograph of him for the memorial service, so an archive photograph from the Xinhua News Agency was used. Because his ashes had been lost, the urn held his glasses, a pen, a seal, a copy of Guan Hanqing and the score of "March of the Volunteers".

After Tian was denounced, his lyrics for "March of the Volunteers" were banned along with his other works. On formal occasions that required the national anthem, the music was played but the words were not sung, and "The East Is Red" often took its place at large gatherings. In March 1978, the National People's Congress reconfirmed "March of the Volunteers" as the national anthem but adopted new, collectively written lyrics, which included references to Mao. On 4 December 1982, three years after Tian's rehabilitation, the National People's Congress revoked the 1978 lyrics and restored his original words. The anthem was written into the Constitution in 2004.

== Personal life ==
Tian had four marriages or partnerships. He first married his cousin Yi Shuyu, whose father had paid for their studies in Japan. She died in January 1925, at the age of 22. Before her death, she asked Tian to marry her friend Huang Dalin, and the two had a brief marriage that attracted public comment. Tian later married Lin Weizhong. According to the writer Su Shuyang, it was Lin who passed the lyrics of "March of the Volunteers" to Xia Yan after Tian's arrest in 1935. The writer An E met Tian at the Southern Society around the winter of 1929, and she had a strong influence on his turn to the left around 1930. She became his wife. His mother, Yi Keqin, lived with him in Beijing, and his son Tian Shen recalled that his library held about 100,000 volumes. Another son, Tian Dawei, became a noted translator of Russian literature, and he died in 2013 at the age of 82.

== Works ==
Tian wrote more than 60 spoken dramas and operas, more than 20 works for traditional opera and more than 2,000 poems.

=== Major plays ===
- Kafeidian Yi Ye (A Night in a Café) 1920
- Wufan Zhiqian (Before Lunch) 1922
- Huo Hu Zhi Ye (The Night the Tiger Was Caught) 1924
- Suzhou Ye Hua (Night Talk in Suzhou) 1928
- Hu Shang de Beiju (Tragedy on the Lakeshore) 1928
- Ming You Zhi Si (Death of a Noted Actor) 1929
- Nan Gui (Return to the South) 1929
- Mei Yu (The Rainy Season) 1931
- Yueguang Qu (The Moonlight Sonata) 1932
- Luan Zhong 1932
- Yangzi Jiang de Bao Feng Yu (Storm on the Yangtze) 1934
- Hui Chun Zhi Qu (Spring Melody) 1935
- Hong Shui (Flood) 1935
- Lugou Qiao (Lugou Bridge) 1937
- Han Jiang Yu Ge (Fisherman's Song of the Han River) 1939
- Qiu Sheng Fu 1942
- Liren Xing (Women Side by Side)
- Guan Hanqing 1958
- Xie Yaohuan 1961

=== Librettos ===
- Baishe Zhuan (The White Snake) 1958

=== Film scripts ===
- Spring Dream by the Lake (1927)
- Go to the People (1927, unfinished)
- Three Modern Women (1932)
- Sons and Daughters in a Time of Storm (1935)
- Women Side by Side (1949)
- A Test of Love (1958)

=== Song lyrics ===
- "March of the Volunteers" (1935)
- "The Wandering Songstress" (1937)

=== Translations ===
- Salomé (Oscar Wilde) (1921)

== Legacy ==
Drama historians regard Tian as one of the three founders of modern Chinese spoken drama. His former residence in Changsha County, where he lived until he was ten, has been restored on its original site. The historian Jeremiah Jenne wrote that Tian "was neither sufficiently cultural nor revolutionary enough to survive the opening salvos of the Cultural Revolution".

== In popular culture ==
Tian was the model for the character Kuang Wentao, played by Gao Bo, in the 1959 biographical film Nie Er, which retold the story of the composition of the national anthem for the tenth anniversary of the People's Republic.

Cultural offices
| Previous: New office | Chairman of China Theatre Association; July 1949 – December 1968 | Next: Cao Yu |
