= Hong Shen =

Chinese playwright

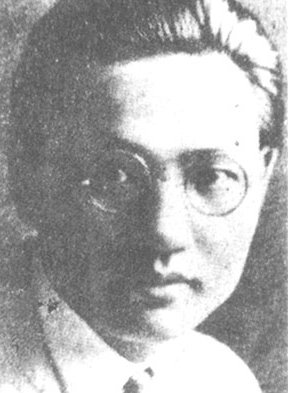
- Hong in the 1920s
- Born: December 31, 1894; Wujin, Jiangsu, Qing Empire
- Died: August 29, 1955 (aged 60); Beijing
- Occupations: playwright, screenwriter, director, film theorist
- Notable work: Yama Zhao (1923); The Young Mistress's Fan; Mrs. Shentu (1925); Wukui Bridge (1931)
- Style: Chinese spoken drama

Hong Shen (Chinese: 洪深; Wade–Giles: Hung Shen; 31 December 1894 – 29 August 1955) was a Chinese playwright, film director and screenwriter, film and drama theorist, and educator. He is considered by drama historians as one of the three founders of the modern Chinese spoken drama, together with Tian Han and Ouyang Yuqian. He wrote the first Chinese film script, Mrs. Shentu.

== Early life and education ==
Hong Shen was born in Wujin, Jiangsu Province, Qing Empire on 31 December 1894. After attending secondary schools in Shanghai and Tianjin, he entered the newly founded Tsinghua School (now Tsinghua University) in 1912, and graduated in 1916. He then left for the United States to study ceramic engineering at Ohio State University on a Boxer Indemnity Scholarship. While there, he wrote and produced two plays in English. A cast of Chinese students from OSU and Oberlin College performed one of them, The Wedded Husband, in April 1919 to an audience of 1300 in the university chapel. It was probably the first play written by a citizen of China to be performed in the United States. In the fall of 1919, he transferred to Harvard University and was selected as one of "Baker's Dozen" to study drama under Professor George Pierce Baker.

== Career ==
Hong Shen returned to China in 1922, with the ambition of becoming China's Ibsen. He taught Western Literature at Fudan University in Shanghai, as well as several other universities. He wrote and acted in the play Yama Zhao in 1923, which strongly opposed the brutal warfare that plagued China at the time, which is now known as the Warlord Era. The play was well received and established his reputation as a playwright. He joined the Shanghai Association for Dramatists, and made a number of plays, including The Young Mistress's Fan, which was adapted from Oscar Wilde's Lady Windermere's Fan. The play was tremendously popular and was highly influential to the development of modern drama in China.

In 1925, Hong Shen published the film script Mrs. Shentu in the Shanghai magazine Eastern Miscellany. It was never filmed, but is considered a milestone in film history for being the first published film script in China. He directed his first film, Young Master Feng, at Mingxing (Star) Film Company in 1925. He then co-directed the films Love and Gold (1926) and The Young Mistress's Fan (1928) with Mingxing's founder Zhang Shichuan, and wrote the script for the 1931 film Sing-Song Girl Red Peony (directed by Zhang Shichuan), the first Chinese sound film (though it was sound-on-disc, not sound-on-film). He was appointed director of the China Film School in 1928.

Hong Shen joined the League of Left-Wing Writers in 1930, and participated in political activities. In the 1930s, he wrote many film scripts as well as three plays collectively known as the Trilogy of the Countryside. Wukui Bridge is considered the best of the three. It was first staged in 1931 with Yuan Muzhi playing the main role. Hong also wrote many books and articles on film and drama theory.

After the Japanese invasion in 1937, Hong Shen left Shanghai for inland regions that were free from Japanese occupation. He staged many plays to advocate resistance against Japan. He returned to teach at Fudan University after the end of the Second Sino-Japanese War in 1945, but was forced out because of his pro-Communist sympathy. He taught briefly at Xiamen University in Fujian Province before going to Northeast China in 1948, which was under Communist control.

After the Communists won the Chinese Civil War and founded the People's Republic of China in 1949, Hong Shen was appointed Director of the Bureau of External Cultural Relations under the Ministry of Culture, and Vice-President of the China Theatre Association. He was also a member of the First National Committee of the Chinese People's Political Consultative Conference. On 29 August 1955, he died of lung cancer in Beijing.

== Bibliography ==
- Chen, Xiaomei (1 April 2014). The Columbia Anthology of Modern Chinese Drama. Columbia University Press. ISBN 978-0-231-16502-0.
- Cody, Gabrielle H. (2007). The Columbia Encyclopedia of Modern Drama. Columbia University Press. ISBN 978-0-231-14422-3.
- Eberstein, Bernd, ed. (1989). A Selective Guide to Chinese Literature 1900–1949: The Drama. BRILL. ISBN 90-04-09098-3.
- Huang, Xuelei (2014). Shanghai Filmmaking: Crossing Borders, Connecting to the Globe, 1922–1938. BRILL. ISBN 978-90-04-27934-6.
- Ye, Tan; Zhu, Yun (2012). Historical Dictionary of Chinese Cinema. Rowman & Littlefield. ISBN 978-0-8108-6779-6.
