= Xiong Foxi =

Chinese playwright

Xiong Foxi (Chinese: 熊佛西; 1900 − 26 October 1965) was an American-educated Chinese playwright famous for his experimental drama in the Ding County, Hebei Province (1932–37). His ambition was creating the peasants' drama of educative value. One of the plays, Sleeping on Brushwood and Tasting Gall (Woxin changdan) popularized the topic of "national humiliation" through the image of Goujian, the Yue king of the Spring and Autumn period. He was the first President of the Shanghai Theatre Academy.

In 1921, he was among the founders of The People's Drama Society. The group was influential in developing the theoretical basis for huaju including through the society's journal Drama. The society proposed rejecting the trappings of traditional opera, advocated originality in production, the creation of new sets and costumes, and developing native Chinese spoken word drama.

== Literature ==
Paul A. Cohen, Speaking to history: the story of King Goujian in twentieth-century China. 2009.
