= Li Huiniang =

1962 play by Meng Chao

Li Huiniang (Chinese: 李慧娘; pinyin: Lǐ Huìniáng) is a tragicomedy written by Meng Chao. Told in six acts and set in the Song dynasty, the plot follows the titular heroine, who becomes a vengeful ghost after being killed by her husband. It premiered in 1962 to "overwhelmingly positive" praise but was subsequently attacked by Chinese Communist Party officials for being "anti-socialist".

== Plot ==
Set around the autumn of 1275 in the Southern Song dynasty, the play opens in Grand Chancellor Jia Sidao's residence in the capital city of Hangzhou, where his birthday is being celebrated. Jia is indifferent to the fact that the Song remains at war with the Mongol-led Yuan dynasty and even sings, "Let the country go to pieces." Scholar Pei Shunqing (裴舜卿) pens a satirical poem attacking the chancellor, which Jia's concubine Li Huiniang (李慧娘) hears and tacitly approves of. Jia himself, however, decides to persecute Pei.

In the second act, Pei meets with fellow students at the West Lake to discuss drafting a complaint to the emperor about the chancellor's failings. Pei confronts Jia, who is coincidentally at the lake too for an outing. Li lets out a sigh of admiration for Pei, which Jia hears. In the following act, Jia accuses Li of infidelity. She talks back and is fatally struck by Jia's sword.

Now a ghost, Li returns in the fourth act in Jia's garden and proclaims that she has found liberation in death. Meanwhile, Pei has been imprisoned in Jia's residence. Li rescues him and they confess their feelings for one another. Immobilising Jia's guards with her supernatural powers, Li confronts her former husband, who eventually passes out. She leaps onto a table and proclaims herself as Li Huiniang, "the invincible living care-taker".

== Development ==
Between 1949 and 1956, so-called guixi (鬼戲) or "ghost plays" were banned for promoting superstition. However, the ban was lifted during the Hundred Flowers Campaign. Meng Chao began conceiving of a remake of a late sixteenth-century drama involving a vengeful ghost in one of its subplots, the Hongmei ji (紅梅記) or Red Flowering Plum, while recovering from illness in his Beijing residence in late 1959. The Hongmei ji had already inspired numerous other plays, including the Hongmei ge (紅梅閣) which Meng enjoyed watching as a child in Zhucheng, Shandong.

Meng's childhood friend Kang Sheng was heavily involved in the making of Li Huiniang. He advised him on "everything from the content of the play, to turns of phrase, to the colour of fringe for the ghost costume of Li Huiniang. For instance, in the original Hongmei ji, Li Huiniang murmurs at the sight of the young scholar Pei Shunqing, "Beautiful, this young man." Kang convinced Meng to change the line to "How strong, this young man," to eliminate the "sensual element" of Li's remark.

At the urging of fellow playwright Jin Ziguang, Meng wrote Li Huiniang for staging as Kunqu opera. Written in classical Chinese, the script was published in the national journal Juben (劇本) or Playscripts in 1962, with Meng and Lu Fang (陸放) credited with the writing and music respectively.

== Critical reception ==
The initial response to Li Huiniang was "overwhelmingly positive". Kang Sheng declared that it was the Northern Kun Opera Theatre's best performance since its founding in 1956. Leading Chinese Communist Party member Peng Zhen watched it twice, while translator Yang Xianyi described it as the best adaptation of the original Li Huiniang story found in the Hongmei ji. Reviewers writing for the People's Daily praised the "importance placed on Li Huiniang, her quest for vengeance, and the consistency of her actions and temperament throughout the play."

From 1962 onwards, however, ghost plays were subject to much scrutiny once again. According to his personal physician Li Zhisui, Mao Zedong did not respond favourably to a 1963 staging of Li Huiniang at Zhongnanhai, whereas Mao's wife Jiang Qing dismissed the play as "superstitous".

Jiang successfully petitioned for the Ministry of Culture to reintroduce its ban on ghost plays in March 1963. Li Huiniang was cited in the ministry's report as an example of an "extremely problematic drama" that "played up" ghosts. In the following years, Jiang continued attacking Li Huiniang for being both "antiparty, antisocialist" and "feudal". At the 1964 Beijing Opera Festival, Kang Sheng—who had repeatedly assured Meng Chao not to worry about political retribution—denounced the play as a "poisonous weed".

In January 1965, the Theatre Report published an editorial which stated that "Comrade Meng Chao's revised edition of the Kun opera Li Huiniang is a poisonous, anti-Party, antisocialist thought weed." In June of the same year, Lishi jiaoxue (History Teaching) published an essay titled "Comrade Meng Chao's Adaptation of the Kun Opera Li Huiniang Is a Poisonous, Anti-Party, Anti-Socialist Thought Weed". Numerous other commentators—some of whom had previously praised the play—echoed similar anti-Li Huiniang sentiments.

Unable to produce evidence that authorities such as Kang Sheng had initially approved of his play, Meng unsuccessfully attempted to commit suicide in the late 1960s. The doctor attending to him at the hospital reportedly refused to operate on him until being given the green light by party officials, who opined that a "big traitor" like Meng could not be allowed to die. Meng withdrew from public life and died in May 1976. His reported last words were "Yuan a!" (冤啊) or "The injustice!".

== Performance history ==
The play was presented to the Northern Kun Opera Theatre in 1960. It was first staged a year later. Kang Sheng urged Zhou Enlai to attend a performance in October 1961; to accommodate Zhou's busy schedule, a special performance was staged at the Diaoyutai State Guesthouse. Zhou reportedly enjoyed the play a lot, "appearing very happy while watching and clapping loudly at the end."

Both the play and Meng Chao were rehabilitated after 1978. On 27 April 1979, the Northern Kun Opera Theatre staged the first production of Li Huiniang in over fifteen years.

== See also ==
- Ghosts in Chinese culture
