= Lin Shu =

Chinese writer (1852–1924)

- Traditional Chinese: 林紓
- Simplified Chinese: 林纾
Transcriptions
Standard Mandarin
- Hanyu Pinyin: Lín Shū
- Wade–Giles: Lin2 Shu1

Qinnan
- Chinese: 琴南
Transcriptions
Standard Mandarin
- Hanyu Pinyin: Qínnán
- Wade–Giles: Ch'in2-nan2

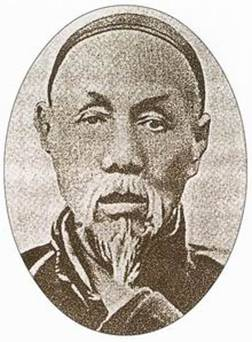
Lin Shu

Lin Shu (Chinese: 林紓, November 8, 1852 – October 9, 1924; courtesy name Qinnan (琴南) was a Chinese writer. He was well known for introducing Western literature to a whole generation of Chinese readers, despite his ignorance of any foreign languages; collaborating with others including actual translators, he released over 180 Classical Chinese translations of English or French works, mostly novels, drawn from 98 writers of 11 countries.

== Life ==
=== Early life and education ===
Lin was born in Min County (now Fuzhou City) in Fujian Province, and died in Beijing. He was born into a poor family. However, he enjoyed reading Chinese books and worked hard at assimilating them. In 1882 he was granted the title of Juren, given to scholars who successfully passed the imperial examination at the provincial level. The young Lin Shu held progressive views and believed that China should learn from Western nations in order that the country might advance.

=== Translations ===
In 1897 Lin's wife died. His friend Wang Shouchang (王壽昌) (1864–1926), who had studied in France and hoped to distract Lin from his bereavement, suggested that together they translate into Chinese Alexandre Dumas's La Dame aux Camélias. Wang Shouchang interpreted the story for Lin, who rendered it into Classical Chinese. The translation (Chinese: 巴黎茶花女遺事; lit. 'Past Stories of the Camellia-woman of Paris') was published in 1899 and was an immediate success. Progressive intellectuals realized that the effect of translated literature on the public could be exploited for their reform agenda. In Lin Shu's time, many scholars of bourgeois inclination, such as Kang Youwei and Liang Qichao, engaged in translating literary works and political novels, with a view to promoting bourgeois reforms.

Other major works translated by Lin include Uncle Tom's Cabin.

Lin is also known widely as a guwenjia (古文家 master of ancient-style prose), which also casts him as an anchor of the traditionalist cultural politics. Lin Shu used classical Chinese in the translation of novels in an attempt to bridge the gap between classical Chinese and Western literary languages.

On the one hand, he strengthened the narrative function of classical Chinese to adapt itself to a realistic description; on the other hand, he tried to make his translations more succinct than the original by simplification to fit the habit of the Chinese readers. As a famous translator, Lin Shu has used his imagination to communicate with the invisible text and collaborate with the foreign authors.

Lin describes, in his translator's preface to Dickens's The Old Curiosity Shop (Chinese: 孝女耐兒傳; lit. 'Biography of the Filial Daughter Nell'), how he worked on his translations:

I have no foreign languages. I cannot pass for a translator without the aid of several gentlemen, who interpret the texts for me. They interpret, and I write down what they interpret. They stop, and I put down my pen. 6,000 words can be produced after a mere four hours' labour. I am most fortunate to have my error-plagued, rough translations kindly accepted by the learned. (予不審西文，其勉強廁身于譯界者，恃二三君子，為余口述其詞，余耳受而手追之，聲已筆止，日區四小時，得文字六千言。其間疵謬百出，乃蒙海內名公，不鄙穢其徑率而收之，此予之大幸也。)

=== Scholarly comments ===
Lin's translations were much forgotten until the essay "Lin Shu's Translations" (Chinese: 林紓的翻譯) by Qian Zhongshu appeared in 1963. Since then, the interest in Lin's translations has been revived. In 1981, the Commercial Press (Chinese: 商務印書館; pinyin: Shāngwù yìnshūguǎn), the original publisher of many Lin's translations, reprinted ten of Lin's renditions (in simplified characters, with modern punctuations).

In his essay, Qian Zhongshu quoted Goethe's simile of translators as "geschäftige Kuppler", which stated that Lin Shu served well as a matchmaker between Western literature and Chinese readers, as he himself (a most avid reader of western books) was indeed motivated by Lin's translations to learn foreign languages. Qian also pointed out that Lin Shu often made "improvements" to the original as well as abridgments. According to Qian, Lin Shu's career, which lasted almost 30 years, can be divided into two phases. In the first phase (1897–1913), Lin's renditions were mostly vigorous, despite all the mistranslations. After that, Lin's renditions were dull, serving only as a means to eke out a living.

The following is Lin's rendition of the famous opening of David Copperfield:

大偉考伯菲而曰：余在此一部書中，是否為主人翁者，諸君但逐節下觀，當自得之。余欲自述余之生事，不能不溯源而筆諸吾書。余誕時在禮拜五夜半十二句鐘，聞人言，鐘聲丁丁時，正吾開口作呱呱之聲。(Whether I shall turn out to be the hero of my own life, or whether that station will be held by anybody else, these pages must show. To begin my life with the beginning of my life, I record that I was born (as I have been informed and believe) on a Friday, at twelve o'clock at night. It was remarked that the clock began to strike, and I began to cry, simultaneously.)

The sinologist Arthur Waley held a high opinion of Lin's translations, suggesting they are not inferior to Dickens' originals:

To put Dickens into classical Chinese would on the face of it seems to be a grotesque undertaking. But the results are not at all grotesque. Dickens, inevitably, becomes a rather different and to my mind a better writer. All the overelaboration, the overstatement and uncurbed garrulity disappear. The humour is there, but is transmuted by a precise, economical style; every point that Dickens spoils by uncontrolled exuberance, Lin Shu makes quietly and efficiently.

During the New Cultural Movement, Lin Shu was much considered as a defender of Literary Chinese. He did not oppose the use of Vernacular Chinese (indeed he wrote a number of poems in the vernacular language), but he could not agree on the total abolition of Literary Chinese as was proposed then.

== Sources ==
- Chen, Weihong, and Cheng, Xiaojuan. “An Analysis of Lin Shu’s Translation Activity from the Cultural Perspective.” Theory and Practice in Language Studies, vol. 4, no. 6, June 2014, p. 1201.
- Rachel Lung (2004).The Oral Translator’s “Visibility”: The Chinese Translation of David Copperfield by Lin Shu and Wei Yi, Volume 17, Issue 2, 2e semestre 2004, p. 161–184 Traduction, éthique et société
- Waley, Arthur (1958). "Notes on Translation", The Atlantic Monthly, the 100th Anniversary Issue.
- Relinque Eleta, Alicia (2021). "Entre tapices flamencos y brocados chinos", in Miguel de Cervantes. Historia del Caballero Encantado. Traducción de Lin Shu de El ingenioso hidalgo don Quijote de la Mancha, Ginger Ape Books&Films, Mil Gotas, pp. 21–45.
- Xue Suizhi 薛绥之 Zhang Juncai 张俊才 (ed.) (1983). Lin Shu yanjiu ziliao (林纾研究资料 "Material for the study of Lin Shu"). Fuzhou: Fujian renmin chubanshe.
- Mikaël Gómez Guthart. "Lin Shu, author of the Quixote", World Literature Today, July 2018.
- Chen, Weihong, & Cheng, Xiaojuan. (2015). A Preliminary Probe into Lin Shu’s Creative Translation. Journal of Language Teaching and Research, 6, 416-422.
- César Guarde-Paz (2015) A Translator in the Shadows of Early Republican China Lin Shu's Position in Modern Chinese Literature an Overview, Monumenta Serica, 63:1, 172-192
- Hill, Michael Gibbs. “National Classicism: Lin Shu as Textbook Writer and Anthologist, 1908-1924.” Twentieth-Century China, vol. 33, no. 1, Nov. 2007, pp. 27–52.
- Huang, Alexander C. Y. “Lin Shu, Invisible Translation, and Politics.” Perspectives: Studies in Translation Theory and Practice, vol. 14, no. 1, 2006, pp. 55–65.
