= Yu Shangyuan =

Chinese playwright and drama educationist (1897-1970)

- Photo of Yu taken at the Columbia University Chinese Students Association
- Born: October 4, 1897; Shashi, Hubei, China
- Died: April 30, 1970 (aged 72)

Yu Shangyuan (Chinese: 余上沅; pinyin: Yú Shàngyuán) (October 4, 1897 – April 30, 1970) was a 20th-century playwright, Chinese drama educationist and theorist. Yu Shangyuan's hometown was in Shashi, Hubei Province, China. His whole family depended on low wages to make a living. However, he enjoyed drama since he was a little boy. Being recommended by Hu Shih (Chinese: 胡适) and Chen Duxiu (Chinese: 陈独秀), he went to Peking University and graduated from the English department, then, he went to America for further study. As one of the founders of Chinese modern dramas, he made a considerable contribution to dramaturgical theory. His main achievements are his contribution to the development of "the Chinese drama movement" (Chinese: 国剧运动) and his representative works: Syllabus of Performing Arts (Chinese: 表演艺术大纲).

== Family and education background ==
Yu Shangyuan was born on October 4, 1897, and enjoyed drama since he was a little child. Yu's family was not rich. His father was a salesclerk in a cloth store called Yu Hongchang. His mother did all the housework. At the age of 7, he studied in an old-style private school which was opened by his housemate. He dropped out of school when he was 12 years old and then he went to a cloth shop to be an apprentice. Fifteen-year-old Yu was enrolled in Boone Memorial School of Wuchang. After he graduated, he entered undergraduate of the school and majored in liberal arts. Being recommended by Hu Shih (Chinese:胡适) and Chen Duxiu (Chinese:陈独秀), he transferred to the English department of Peking University and studied Western literature. In 1920, Yu taught in the English department of Beijing University. From 1921 to 1924, Yu actively participated in the New Culture Movement (Chinese:新文化运动) and developed a great interest in drama. At the same time, he published several concerned articles in the supplement of the morning paper. (Chinese:晨报) In 1923, he went to Carnegie University on a half scholarship from the government for further study, then majored in Theatrical Literature and Art at Columbia University in New York.

== Working experience ==
Returning to China in 1925, Yu joined in the organization of "Chinese drama club" in Beijing. Then he opened the department of theatricals in Beijing Mei Zhuan College (Now, it is Beijing Art College). Besides, he taught modern dramatic art, stage designing and performance and rehearsals, etc. Also he directed several dramas, for instance, Mutiny. In autumn of 1926, Yu accepted the offer to become a professor at Shanghai Guanghua University, Jinan University, etc. At the same time, he, together with Xu Zhimo, set up a bookshop named New Moon (Chinese: 新月), where he took the responsibility of editor and manager.

In the winter of 1928, being engaged by the secretary of the Peking China Education and Culture Foundation (中华教育文化基金会), he served as professor in National Peiping University Institute of the Arts and organized Peiping small theater in his free time.

In 1935, accompanied by Mei Lanfang went to the Soviet Union to visit and perform. Then went to European countries to study drama education. In 1935, the National Theatre School was established in Nanjing, he was hired as a school councilor and principal.

When the Second Sino-Japanese War began, Yu moved his school to Changsha, Chongqing to organize students to do propaganda work.

== Representative works ==
In the autumn of 1926, Yu Shangyuan translated and published some foreign dramas: Longevity Tactic (Chinese: 长生决) and Admirable Clayton (Chinese: 可钦佩的克莱敦). He also collected the theatrical papers and compiled a book called national opera movement. From the winter of 1928 to 1935, during which he directed famous plays such as La Traviata. During this period Yu was hired as the school councilor and principal of the National Theatre School, he directed the famous play of Shakespeare the Merchant of Venice. Yu Shangyuan consistently adhered to Cai Yuanpei's idea of school governance and took the lead in writing the Syllabus of Performing Arts, Syllabus of director Arts and synopsis of stage design (Chinese: 表演艺术大纲, 导演艺术大纲, and 舞台设计提高). In 1959, Yu compiled various speeches: "criticism of Western dramaturgical theory" and "Drama Introduction". He also translated Baker's theatrical skills and other famous works. In 1959, he started teaching in Shanghai Theater Academy. During that time, he wrote several articles, for example, "Western Theory of Drama Criticism" (西洋戏剧理论批评), Drama Introduction (戏剧概论).

== Other contributions ==
Yu Shangyuan and Wen Yiduo launched the "National Drama Movement", which lay the root for a different understanding of Theatre Arts later. In the summer of 1924, Yu shangyuan became acquainted with Wen Yiduo, Xiong Fuoxi, who shared the same interest with him. They talk about the dramatic art, and eager to try. Soon after, Wen Yiduo and Xiong Fuoxi co-edited a one-act play, and then, together with Yu Shangyuan, organized the performance of the Cowherd and the Weaving Maid (牛郎织女). In the winter of 1924, Cambridge Alumni Association initiated wrote and performed an English drama " endless sorrow "(此恨绵绵), which based on the classical Chinese drama " The Palace of Eternal Life" (长生殿). On the day of the drama ending, the four main director including Yu shangyuan, Wen Yiduo, Zhao Taimou, Zhang Jiazhu, gathered next to the fireplace in the Yu's apartments to sum up the pros and cons of this performance. During this discussion, the four hot-blooded youth came to an avant-garde topic: "National Opera Movement", Therefore, " National Opera Movement "was put forward. To carry out the "National Opera Movement", Yu and his friends conducted an extensive survey. They traveled to New York theaters to learn the building knowledge of the theater. After two months of investigation, deliberation, and modification, they drafted the "Peking Arts Theatre Program Outline". In the Outline, they envisaged to build Beiping Art Theatre actor schools, libraries and museums on theater. Besides, they would like to founder the "puppet magazine". What's more, they planned to raise the subvention used to select students to learn the art of theater abroad.

In this period, many theater lovers like Yu Shangyuan, Wen Yiduo etc. initiated the establishment of a dramatic improvement community. They planned two publications titled Diaochong and He Tu to focus on the aspect of drama. Contributions were sent to their hands constantly when the news spread. Because of the successful performance of "endless sorrow "(此恨绵绵), the reputation of Yu Shangyuan and other people was greatly boosted among the Chinese American and the presider of the Cambridge Chinese Student Union also was encouraged. In the spring of 1925, they initiated an English drama "Lute" (琵琶记) which was written and performed by themselves and invited Yu Shangyuan and Zhao Taimou to guide rehearsals. On March 28, "Lute"(琵琶记) was put on the stage in one of the famous theaters in the United States—Boston Copley Theater and succeeded again. The two English costume of the Chinese students in the United States performing exposed the soul of traditional Chinese culture to the majority of the audience, and aroused strong repercussions. The local newspaper Christian Science Monitor reported the special event of the Chinese students. In the summer of 1925, Yu Shangyuan, Wen Yiduo and several other like-minded persons returned home one after the other. Later, they established the Beiping Art College Drama Department, set up the column of the" drama Journal" (剧刊) in the "Morning News Supplement" (晨报 副刊) to discuss the National Opera, founded " New Moon " (新月) in Shanghai to promote "the Chinese drama movement" (Chinese: 国剧运动) and sponsored small theaters in Beiping to develop Bai Yang and other outstanding performing artists. After their returning home, their most splendorous work is the founder of the "drama highest institution"—National Theatre College, and later, many of the core figure on the stage and screen are out of school.

== Criticism ==
The core theory of Yu Shangyuan's National Opera is advocating freehand. In the text of the National Opera, he makes a more specific explanation for it. He believes that firstly National Opera should be a pure art. It has been reflected by the painting, sculpture and calligraphy and traditional Chinese opera. In short, all the Chinese arts are impressionistic, non-simulated, powerful and rhythmic.

As the backbones of the National Drama Movement, Yu Shangyuan, Zhao Taimouand Xiong Foxi had all spared no effort to support the National Drama Movement, and written special articles which represented the artistic ideals of those movement supporters and included their artistic individuality. But there were also differences in the expression of their ideals and dramatic opinions. The theories of Yu Shangyuan's National Drama centered on freehand brushwork. Zhao Taimou pursued the mixture of the world's universality and the national individuality in his idealof National Drama. And Xiong Foxi emphasized and valued the content of the drama prior to the form.
