= Wang Zhongsheng =

Qing Chinese dramatist and revolutionary

Wang Zhongsheng (1874 – 2 December 1911) was a Qing dynasty dramatist, official, and revolutionary. He founded the Spring Sun Society, one of China's earliest troupes dedicated to the performance of the modern spoken drama, which came from the west and differed considerably from the traditional Chinese theatre, or Chinese opera.

For his participation in Xinhai revolution, he was executed as a rebel 29 days before the founding of the Republic of China (1912–1949).
