= Ouyang Yuqian =

Chinese playwright (1889–1962)

- 欧阳予倩
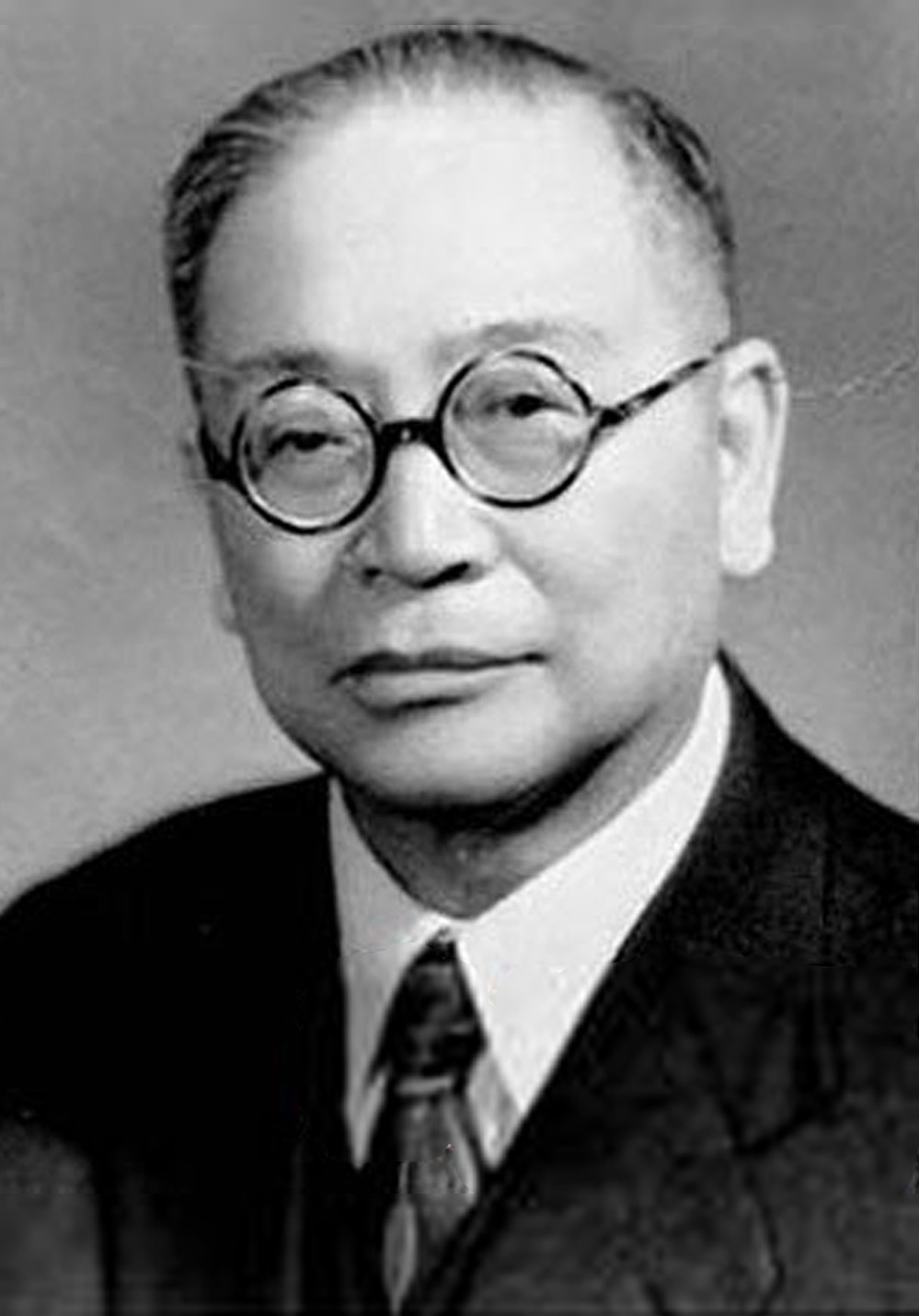
- Ouyang Yuqian
- Born: Ouyang Liyuan; May 12, 1889; Liuyang, Hunan, Qing China
- Died: September 21, 1962 (aged 73); Beijing, China
- Education: Meiji University; Waseda University
- Occupations: Dramatist, educator, film director, actor
- Spouse: Liu Yunqiu (m. 1906)
- Children: Ouyang Shanzun
- Relatives: Ouyang Ligeng (father); Liu Yixia (mother); Ouyang Zhonghu (grandfather)
- Writing career
- Language: Chinese
- Period: 1906–1962
- Genres: Stage play, Peking Opera
- Movement: New Play

Chinese name
- Traditional Chinese: 歐陽予倩
- Simplified Chinese: 欧阳予倩
Transcriptions
Standard Mandarin
- Hanyu Pinyin: Ōuyáng Yǔqiàn
- Wade–Giles: Ou-yang Yü-ch'ien
- IPA: Mandarin pronunciation: [óʊ.jǎŋ jù.tɕʰân]

Ouyang Yuqian (Chinese: 欧阳予倩; May 12, 1889 – September 21, 1962) was a Chinese playwright, Peking opera actor and writer, film screenwriter and director, and drama educator. He is considered by drama historians as one of the three founders of the modern Chinese spoken drama, together with Tian Han and Hong Shen. He was also one of the top Peking opera performers, regarded as a southern counterpart of Mei Lanfang.

Ouyang Yuqian was the founding president of the Central Academy of Drama from 1950 until his death in 1962. He also served as vice chairman of the China Federation of Literary and Art Circles, vice chairman of the Chinese Dramatists Association, and chairman of the Chinese Dancers Association.

== Names ==
Ouyang Yuqian's name at birth was Ouyang Liyuan (欧阳立袁), and his hao was Nanjie (南杰). He also used the stage names and pen names including Lanrong (兰容), Liansheng (莲笙), and Taohua Buyi'an Zhu (桃花不疑庵主).

== Early life and education ==
Ouyang Yuqian born on 12 May 1889 into a wealthy and highly educated family in Liuyang, Hunan Province. His father was Ouyang Ligeng (Chinese: 欧阳力耕), and mother Liu Yixia (Chinese: 刘倚霞). His grandfather Ouyang Zhonghu (Chinese: 欧阳中鹄) was a scholar who served as governor of Guilin Prefecture during the Qing dynasty.

When he was 15, Ouyang went to study in Japan. He graduated from Seijo School (成城学校) in Tokyo, and then studied business at Meiji University and literature at Waseda University. In 1906, Ouyang and other Chinese students in Japan co-founded the Spring Willow Society (春柳社, Chunliu She), which marked the beginning of modern Chinese theatre.

== Career ==
=== Early career — Peking opera and drama ===
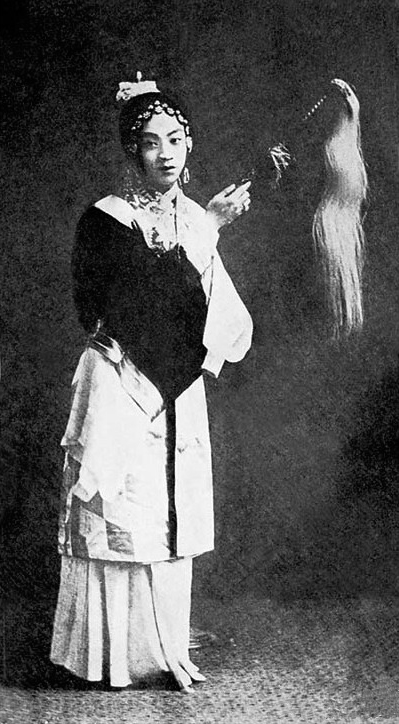
Ouyang Yuqian playing a female dan role in a Peking opera

He returned to China in 1911 and founded the New Play Comrade Society (新剧同志会) with his Spring Willow colleague Lu Jingruo (陆镜若). They later established the Spring Willow Theatre in Shanghai, but it went out of business when Lu died in 1915.

In 1914, Ouyang Yuqian began to write and act in Peking operas. From 1914 to 1928, he wrote 18 operas, and directed and performed in 29. He also adapted more than 50 traditional stories into Peking opera, including many from the classic novel Dream of the Red Chamber. His acting was so highly acclaimed that he was considered the southern counterpart of the master Mei Lanfang. In 1918, he was invited by Zhang Jian to establish an actors' school and the Gengsu Theatre (更俗剧场) in Nantong, Jiangsu.

Although a famous Peking opera performer, Ouyang was also active in promoting the "New Play" (spoken drama). He joined several New Play societies in the 1910s and co-founded several pioneering drama troupes, including the Masses Theatre Society, the Drama Cooperative Society (戏剧协社), and the Southern Drama Society. In 1921, he was among the founders of The People's Drama Society. The group was influential in developing the theoretical basis for huaju including through the society's journal Drama. The society proposed rejecting the trappings of traditional opera, advocated originality in production, the creation of new sets and costumes, and developing native Chinese spoken word drama.

During this period, he collaborated with like-minded dramatists and directors Hong Shen, Ying Yunwei, Zhang Shichuan, Zheng Zhengqiu, and Zhou Jianyun. In 1922, he wrote the play After Returning Home (回家以后), considered one of the earliest satirical comedies in China. In his 1928 play Pan Jinlian, he depicted Pan Jinlian, the archetypal femme fatale of classical Chinese culture, as a free-spirited woman victimized by a male-dominated traditional society. He played the title role himself.

=== 1920s and 1930s — film and drama ===
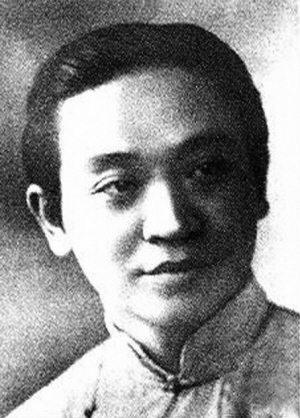
Ouyang Yuqian

After Zhang, Zheng, and Zhou started the Mingxing Film Company in 1922, they invited Ouyang Yuqian to join their studio, but Ouyang declined because, according to himself, he was earning a "substantial salary" as a Peking opera performer. He did help out on several occasions, but at the same time wrote three films for the rival China Sun Motion Picture Company from 1926 to 1928. He acted in two of the three films, Why Not Her? (玉潔冰清) and A Wandering Songstress (天涯歌女), and directed the third, Three Years Later (三年以后).

In 1929, Ouyang Yuqian was invited by Chen Mingshu, chairman of Guangdong Province, to establish the Guangdong Drama Research Institute in Guangzhou. His political view turned increasingly left-wing, especially after the 1932 Japanese attack of Shanghai. He joined the Left-Wing Dramatist League in Guangzhou and participated in the first drama festival in the Soviet Union. In 1933, he joined Chen Mingshu's Fujian Rebellion, and was forced to escape to Japan after its failure.

After returning to Shanghai in 1934, Ouyang Yuqian joined Xinhua Film Company and wrote his first sound film New Peach Blossom Fan (新桃花扇). In 1935, he joined Mingxing, by then one of the largest Chinese film studios, and helped the studio secure a crucial bank loan using his own family resources. He made three films with Mingxing: Qingming Festival (清明时节), Xiao Lingzi (小玲子), and Red Haitang (海棠红).

=== Japanese invasion and Civil War ===
Ouyang Yuqian joined Lianhua Film Company in 1937. While he was shooting the film So Busy (如此繁华), the Empire of Japan launched a full-scale invasion of Shanghai, which destroyed most of the city's film studios. After Japan occupied the Chinese sections of Shanghai, Ouyang made several anti-Japanese plays in the Shanghai International Settlement, before fleeing to British Hong Kong, where he wrote the screenplay for the patriotic film Mulan Joins the Army.

During the Second Sino-Japanese War, Ouyang Yuqian spent most of his time in Guilin, Guangxi in southwest China, which was largely free from Japanese occupation. He studied Guilin opera and established a school for the art. He established Guangxi Provincial Art Museum in 1940, and an art theatre 1944. In 1944, he and Tian Han organized the First Southwest Opera Expo in Guilin, which lasted three months and attracted almost a thousand performers.

After the surrender of Japan at the end of World War II, he returned to Shanghai in 1946 and served as the playwright-director of New China Drama Society (新中国剧社). He also taught at Shanghai Experimental School of Drama. In January 1947, he led a delegation to perform in Taiwan, but had to leave when the February 28 Incident broken out. Because of the Chinese Civil War, Ouyang left again for Hong Kong, and worked as the screenwriter-director of Yonghua Film Company.

=== People's Republic of China ===
Ouyang Yuqian and Mei Lanfang in 1956

In March 1949, he was invited by the Central Committee of the Chinese Communist Party to attend the first Chinese People's Political Consultative Conference. He was elected director of the Chinese National Opera Improvement Committee and a Standing Committee member of the China Federation of Literary and Art Circles.

Ouyang Yuqian became the founding president of Central Academy of Drama in April 1950. He joined the Chinese Communist Party in 1955. He also served as vice chairman of the China Federation of Literary and Art Circles, vice chairman of the Chinese Dramatists Association, and chairman of the Chinese Dancers Association. He was a member of the first National Committee of the Chinese People's Political Consultative Conference and the first and second National People's Congress.

In his later years, he published several memoirs and books on film and drama theory, and a book on Tang dynasty dances. On 21 September 1962, Ouyang Yuqian died of an illness in Beijing.

== Personal life ==
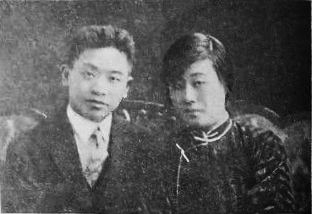
Ouyang Yuqian and wife Liu Yunqiu

Ouyang Yuqian married Liu Yunqiu (Chinese: 刘韵秋), also known as Liu Wenqiu (Chinese: 刘问秋), in 1906. They had a daughter, Ouyang Jingru (Chinese: 欧阳敬如; 13 September 1928–2013) and an adopted son Ouyang Shanzun (Chinese: 欧阳山尊; 24 May 1914–2 July 2009), who was also a dramatist.

== See also ==
- Ouyang Yuqian Grand Theater, in Liuyang, Hunan

== Bibliography ==
- Chen, Xiaomei (1 April 2014). The Columbia Anthology of Modern Chinese Drama. Columbia University Press. ISBN 978-0-231-16502-0.
- Cody, Gabrielle H. (2007). The Columbia Encyclopedia of Modern Drama. Columbia University Press. ISBN 978-0-231-14424-7.
- Huang, Xuelei (12 August 2014). Shanghai Filmmaking: Crossing Borders, Connecting to the Globe, 1922-1938. BRILL. ISBN 978-90-04-27934-6.
- Yeh, Wen-Hsin (2000). Becoming Chinese: Passages to Modernity and Beyond. University of California Press. ISBN 978-0-520-22218-2.

Educational offices
New title	President of Central Academy of Drama; 1950–1962	Next: Cao Yu
