= Fu Lian Cheng =

Fu Lian Cheng (traditional Chinese: 富連成; simplified Chinese: 富连成), initially known as Xi Lian Cheng (traditional Chinese: 喜連成; simplified Chinese: 喜连成), was a Peking Opera school established in 1904 in Beijing, the capital of the Qing dynasty. It closed in 1948, during the Chinese Civil War. It was the Peking opera school with the longest history, the largest scale, and the greatest number of graduates.

Fu Lian Cheng was sponsored by the Jilin merchant Niu Zihou, and run by the Peking opera performer Ye Chunshan. In forty-four years, it trained seven classes of almost 700 students, including some of the greatest Peking opera artists, like Mei Lanfang, Zhou Xinfang, Ma Lianliang, Xiao Cuihua (Yu Lianquan), Tan Fuying, Ma Fulu, and Ye Shengzhang.

== In popular culture ==
In 1995, the story of Fu Lian Cheng was dramatized as a 28-episode television series titled Niu Zihou and Fu Lian Cheng (牛子厚與富連成).

In 2014, Niu Zihou's story was made into a television film titled Godfather of Peking Opera (梨園伯樂).
