= Li Shengsu =

Chinese Peking opera singer-actress (born 1966)

- Born: February 16, 1966 (age 60); Baixiang County, Xingtai City, Hebei, China
- Education: National Academy of Chinese Theatre Arts
- Occupation: Peking opera performer
- Years active: 1986–present
- Employer: China National Peking Opera Company
- Known for: Dan roles
- Style: Mei (Mei Lanfang) school

Chinese name
- Traditional Chinese: 李勝素
- Simplified Chinese: 李胜素
Transcriptions
Standard Mandarin
- Hanyu Pinyin: Lǐ Shèngsù

Li Shengsu (born February 16, 1966) is a Chinese Peking opera singer-actress who plays Dan roles. She began performing traditional Chinese opera from a young age and is a student of Mei Baojiu and other famous opera performers. She is widely considered a Peking opera superstar and has many renowned performances. Currently, Li Shengsu is the director of Troupe One of China National Peking Opera Company. Li also holds positions in other organizations as well, including being a member of the Chinese People's Political Consultative Conference. She has received multiple awards and recognition for her performance in Peking opera.

== Acting career ==
Li Shengsu was born on February 16, 1966, in Baixiang County, Xingtai City of Hebei, China.

She began her career in performing Chinese opera after she was specially recruited into the Yu Opera Troupe of Baixiang County by Wei Shengliang (魏胜良) who was a teacher in the troupe. At that time, she was ten years old. In 1979, at the age of thirteen, Li converted to learning Peking opera since the Hebei Vocational Art College was recruiting students for Peking opera. There, under the instructions of Qi Lanqiu (齐兰秋), she began learning how to perform Dan roles such as Tsing Yi (青衣) and Hua Dan (花旦). Upon graduating in 1986, Li was assigned to the Handan Peking Opera Troupe where she served the roles of main performer and leader.

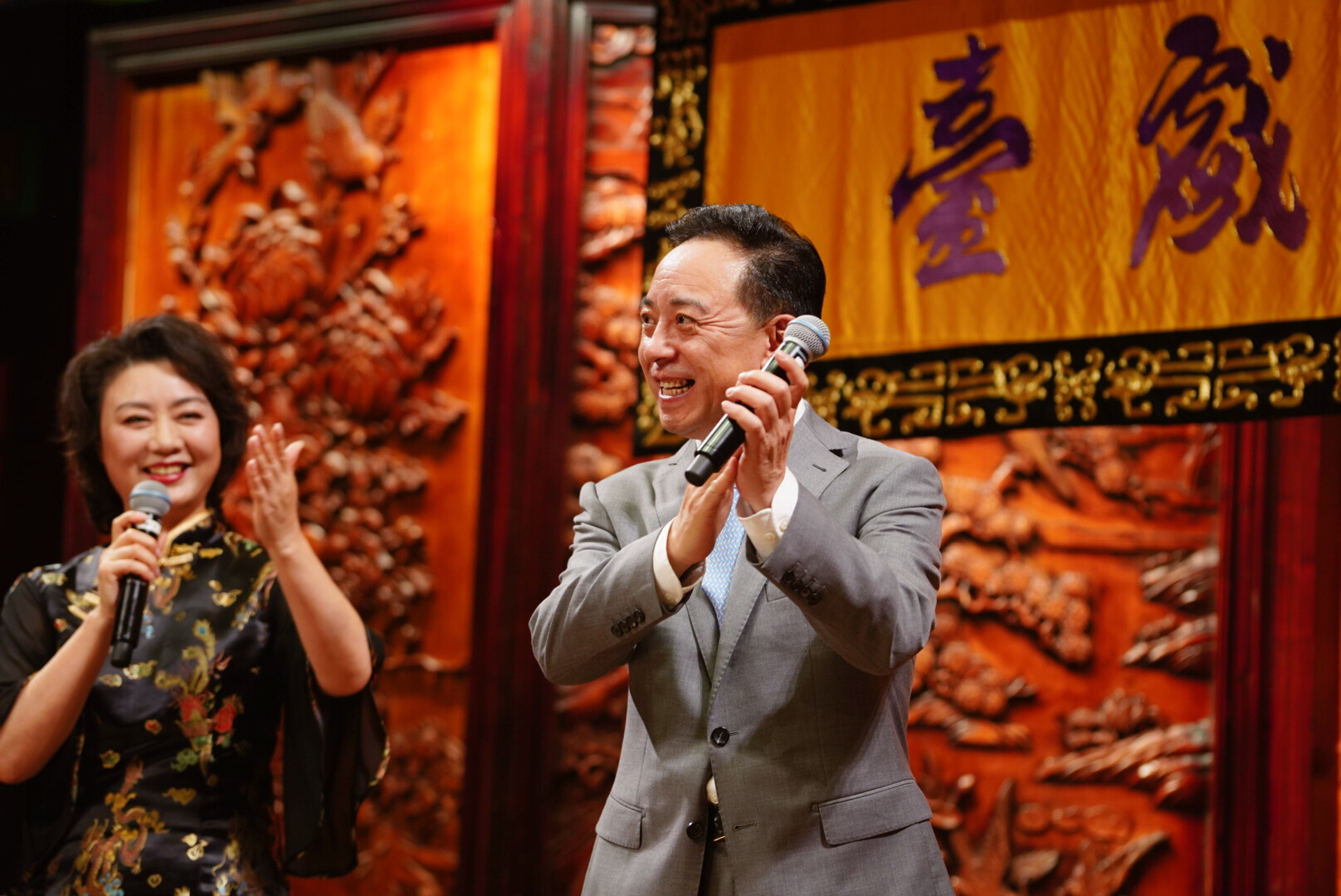
Li Shengsu (left) with fellow Peking opera performer Yu Kuizhi

Li Shengsu became a disciple of the opera performer Liu Xiurong (刘秀荣) in 1987. In 1988, Li Shengsu officially joined the Mei (Mei Lanfang) school or style of Peking opera and became a disciple of Mei Baojiu. Mei Baojiu personally taught her performances such as The Drunken Concubine (贵妃醉酒) and The Phoenix Returns Home (凤还巢).

In 1991, Li Shengsu transferred to the Shanxi Peking Opera Theater as lead performer. There she also served as the head of the Mei Lanfang Peking Opera Troupe.

In 1998, Li Shengsu entered the Graduate School of Outstanding Young Actors of Peking Opera for further study. After three years, Li mastered the professional theory of opera performance and graduated with a graduate degree in 2001. In 2001, she also transferred over to the second troupe of the China National Peking Opera Company as a special recruit. There, she was under the instructions of Qi Lanqiu, Liu Yuantong (刘元彤), and He Junying (何君英) and other Peking opera performers. Not only did Li Shengsu further develop her skills in traditional Peking opera with her mentors, she and her mentors also innovated opera by integrating the different acting skills of various Dan roles into one and adding their own interpretations into old drama to give them new vitality.

== Performances ==
Li Shengsu has performed in various places across China, including Hong Kong and Taiwan. Not only has she performed in China, she has also traveled the world to share her performance with audiences of other countries. Some countries that Li Shengsu has performed in are South Korea, Japan, Spain, Germany, Great Britain, France, the United States, Australia, Italy, Canada, Cuba and Egypt. Some of Li Shengsu's most representative works are listed in the table below:

English name	Original title	English name	Original title
Dabaoguo	大保国	Jinwei Reclamation/Jinwei Fills the Sea	精卫填海
Two Into the Palace	二进宫	Meng Lijun	孟丽君
Cosmic Front	宇宙锋	Ocean Oath	海誓
Red Mane Horse	红鬃烈马	Golden Valley Garden	金谷园
Farewell My Concubine	霸王别姬	The Story of Playing the Sword	弹剑记
The Drunken Concubine	贵妃醉酒	The Soldier Saint Sun Wu	兵圣孙武
Life and Death Hatred	生死恨	Imperial Concubine of the Tang Dynasty	大唐贵妃
Lian Jingfeng	廉锦枫	Jin Deyu	晋德裕
Legend of the White Snake	白蛇传	Mei Lanfang	梅兰芳
Silang (Fourth Son) Visits His Mother	四郎探母	Yuan Chonghuan	袁崇焕
The Phoenix Returns Home	凤还巢	Red Cliff/ Chibi	赤壁
Commander Mu Guiying	穆桂英挂帅	Red Man River/The River All Red	满江红
Xie Yaohuan	谢瑶环	Female General of Yangmen	杨门女将
Red Thread Stealing Box	红线盗盒	Soul Mate/Soul Companion	知音
Goddess of the Luo River	洛神	The Silk Road Great Wall	丝路长城
Liu Yin Ji	柳荫记	Xi'an Incident	西安事变
Wild Boar Forest	野猪林	The Legend of Taizhen	太真外传

== Filmography ==
=== Peking opera films and TV series ===
Li Shengsu starred in some Peking opera films and TV series based on stage productions, such as Xie Yaohuan (2001 TV series), Yuan Chonghuan (2009 film), and Mu Guiying Takes Command (2017 film, directed by Xia Gang).

=== Non-opera films and TV series ===
Year	English title	Original title	Role	Notes
1983	The First Pass Under Heaven	天下第一關		TV series
1988	The Legend of the Daliang Mountains	大涼山傳奇	Yang Feng	Film

== Roles and positions ==
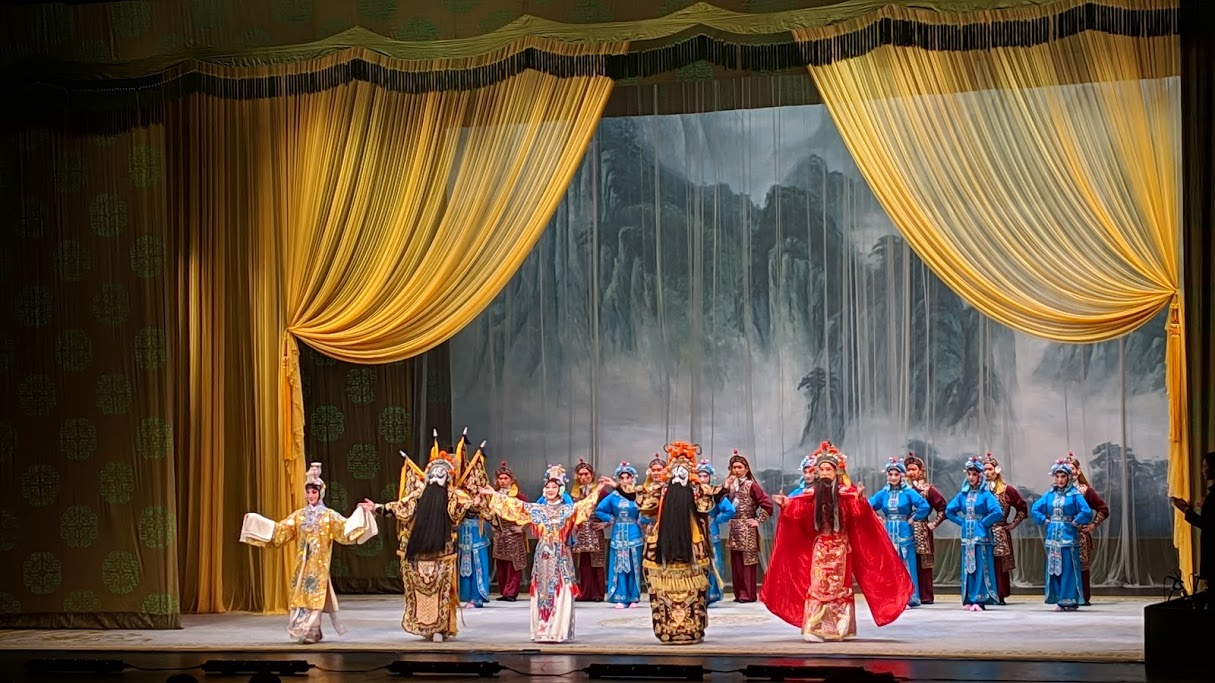
The China National Peking Opera Company at a performance in Taipei

Li Shengsu has held various positions in the Peking opera field and in other areas. She used to serve as leader of the Mei Lanfang Peking Opera Troupe for the Shanxi Peking Opera Theater. She is currently the director of Troupe One of the China National Peking Opera Company after she succeeded Yu Kuizhi to the position on September 18, 2010. She is also a member of the Chinese Dramatist Association as well. Other roles that Li Shengsu holds includes being a member of the 11th and 12th Chinese People's Political Consultative Conference. She is also a member of the executive committee of All-China Women's Federations and a member of the standing committee of the All-China Youth Federation.

== Awards and accomplishments ==
Li Shengsu has been recognized multiple times for her skill and talent in Peking opera.

In 1987, Li Shengsu won the outstanding performance award at the first CCTV National Youth Beijing competition with her performance of Lian Jingfeng (廉锦枫).

In 1991, she was awarded the best performance award at the National Young and Middle-Aged Peking Opera Actor TV Grand Prix for her performance of Red Thread Stealing Box (红线盗盒).

In 1992, Li Shengsu participated in the National Young Peking Opera teams's new play show where she won the Excellent Actor Performance Award for Meng Lijun (孟丽君).

In 1996, Li Shengsu became the recipient of the 13th Plum Blossom Performance Award.

In 1997, she won the title of "Outstanding Young Artist" at the 14th World Youth Festival in Cuba.

In 2001, she received the honorary award for the National Excellent Young Peking Opera Actors. That year she was also honored with the titles "Match 8th Red Flag Bearer", "Advanced Literary and Art Worker" and the "Second Top Ten You of Shanxi Province" by the provincial Party committee and the government.

In 2004, Li Shengsu became the first person to sing Peking opera in the Golden Hall in Vienna, Austria.

In 2008, she was awarded the National Stage Art Excellent Project Award.

In 2010, she won the Excellent Performance Award of the National Art Academy Group Exhibition Competition.

On December 29, 2017, Li Shengsu won the 10th China Gold Record Award for Best Peking Opera and Quyi Performer with her performance in Symphony Peking Opera - Female General of Yangmen (杨门女将).

She also holds the title of national first class performer.
