= CNAC Flight 121 =

1947 aviation accident in China

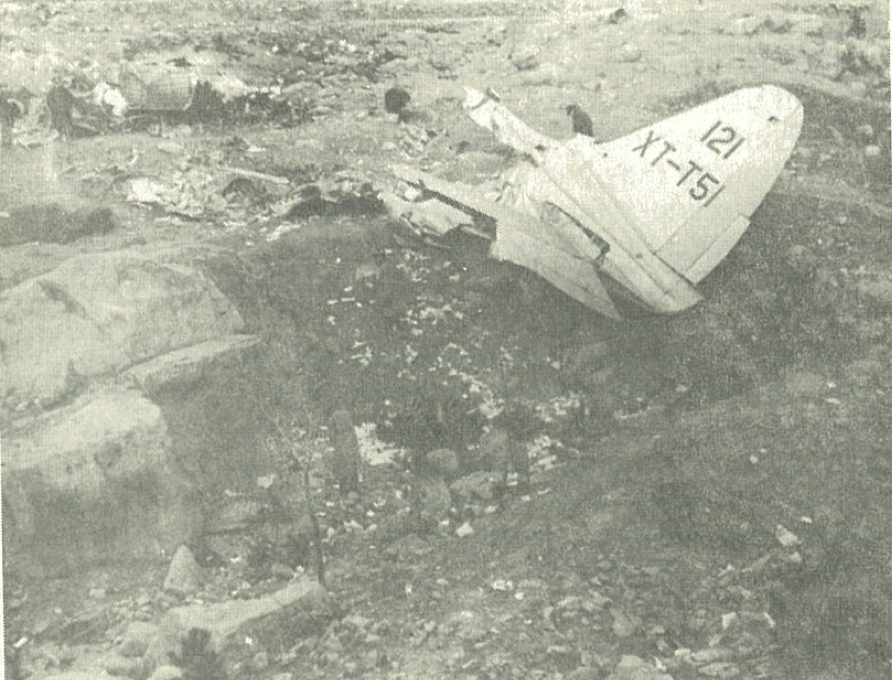
- Crash site with the wreckage visible

Occurrence
- Date: 5 January 1947
- Summary: Controlled flight into terrain due to low visibility
- Site: Langya Mountain, Taoyuan Village, Licun, Qingdao, China

Aircraft
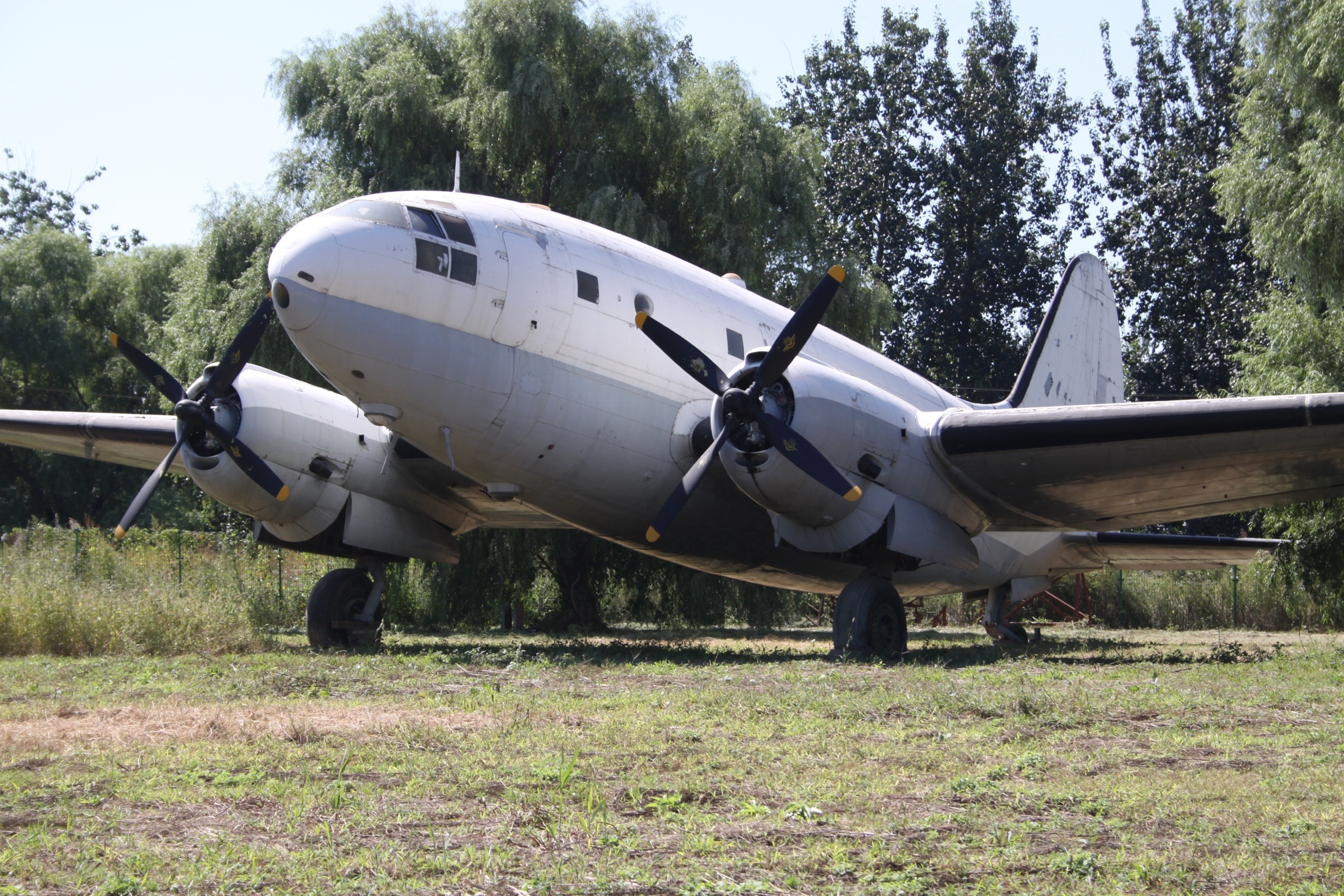
- An identical C46
- Aircraft type: Curtiss C-46 Commando
- Operator: China National Aviation Corporation
- Registration: XT-T51/121
- Flight origin: Longhua Airport, Shanghai, China
- Stopover: Qingdao Airport, Qingdao; Zhangguizhuang Airport, Tianjin
- Destination: Nanyuan Airport, Beiping, China
- Passengers: 39
- Crew: 3
- Fatalities: 42
- Survivors: 0

China National Aviation Corporation Flight 121 was a scheduled domestic passenger flight that crashed on 5 January 1947 near Qingdao, China, after flying into mountainous terrain in poor visibility. All 39 passengers and 3 crew members on board were killed.

The crash occurred during a period of heightened concern over aviation safety in China following multiple recent accidents. Among those killed were several prominent public figures, including Peking opera performer Li Shifang and representatives to the National Constituent Assembly.

== Background ==
On 25 December 1946, three aircraft accidents occurred in Shanghai in what became known as the Black Christmas disaster crashes, prompting widespread public concern about aviation safety. At the time, adverse weather conditions were widely regarded as the primary cause of aviation accidents.

In January 1947, Qingdao's Cangkou Airport was under the control of the United States Navy, which provided relatively advanced meteorological services. The airport had been rebuilt and expanded by the U.S. Navy Seabees in 1946.

== Crew ==
The captain, Charles H. Sharkey, was 21 years old and born in the United States, in Massachusetts Lawrence. He obtained his pilot's license at the age of 16 and served during the Second Sino-Japanese War under Claire Lee Chennault in the Flying Tigers. He was one of the first seven crew members to fly over the Hump, and the only survivor among them at the time. He completed 408 flights over the Hump, setting a flight record.

The co-pilot, Wan Hanguang, was 26 years old and a native of Hunan. He was a second-year student in the biology department at Kwang Hua University, and had just reunited on New Year's Day with his girlfriend, who was studying at Zhejiang University. As Wan had concealed his flight duties by taking leave, Kwang Hua University was unaware of his identity. The radio operator of the aircraft was Wang Chengzhi.

== Flight ==
On 5 January 1947, a Curtiss C-46 Commando, tail number 121, operated by China National Aviation Corporation departed Longhua Airport in Shanghai for Beiping (now Beijing), with scheduled stops in Qingdao and Tianjin.

In the early hours of 5 January, the U.S. Navy issued a warning advising against flight operations due to heavy fog. Despite this warning, Captain Sharkey pressured by passengers and confident in his flying skills, took off from Shanghai at 05:10. At 07:45, the aircraft reached the skies over Qingdao, but was unable to locate the airport due to low visibility. Ground staff of China National Aviation Corporation instructed the aircraft to proceed to Tianjin. However, due to insufficient fuel to reach Tianjin, the captain decided to attempt an emergency landing in farmland. The aircraft ultimately crashed into Langya Mountain (approximately 800 meters above sea level) near Licun, caught fire and all on board were killed.

== Victims ==
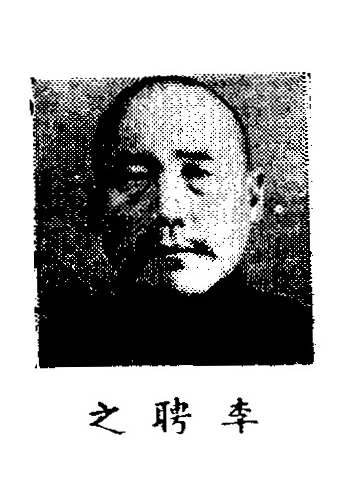
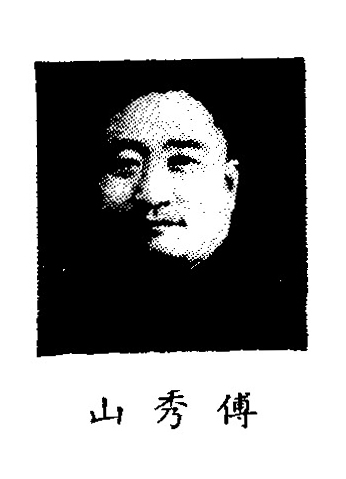
National Assembly representatives Li Pinzhi (left) and Fu Xiushan (right) killed in the crash

There were three representatives of the National Constituent Assembly on board: Mu Zhendong, Li Pinzhi, and Fu Xiushan. As National Assembly representatives were entitled to ticket privileges and priority boarding, three company employees were displaced from the flight. Ding Youmin boarded the aircraft under an assumed name at the request of Li Runshen, a Shandong representative to the National Assembly and then chairman of the Jinan Chamber of Commerce; Li himself had already been imprisoned prior to the Assembly session due to a municipal chamber of commerce fraud case. The Executive Yuan posthumously commended and granted compensation to Fu Xiushan, Li Pinzhi, and Mu Zhendong for dying in the line of duty.

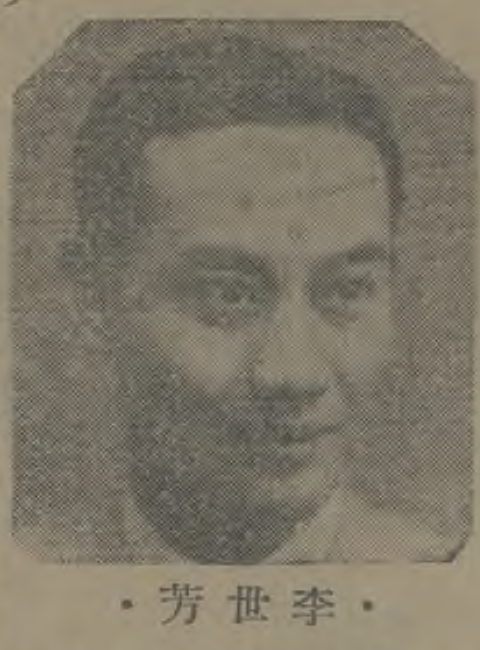
Peking opera performer Li Shifang was killed; his wife reportedly went on a hunger strike after the crash

The Peking opera dan performer Li Shifang, a student of Mei Lanfang, also died in the crash. In late December, Li had initially canceled his ticket after persuasion from Zhang Chunhua, who had narrowly escaped the Black Christmas disaster, and his mentor Mei Lanfang. In early January, concerned that tensions with fellow performer Wei Lianfang might worsen, he decided to travel to Beiping. On 4 January, the flight was canceled due to weather conditions. As tickets for 5 January were already sold out, Li obtained a ticket originally held by the wife of Yang Baosen, who had postponed her journey, via the couple Ma Fulu. In the early hours of 5 January, Mei Lanfang, his family, and fellow apprentice Zhang Shengli personally saw him off at Longhua Airport. Upon hearing news of the crash, Mei Lanfang wept bitterly. The opera community held memorial services for Li in Qingdao, Tianjin, Beiping, and Shanghai, with Yang Shoushan (chairman of the Qingdao Opera Guild), Ye Shengzhang (head of the Fu Lian Cheng troupe), and the "Four Great Dan" performers Shang Xiaoyun and Mei Lanfang officiating in the four cities respectively.

Li Zigu, then representative of the Chinese Chamber of Commerce in London, had intended to attend the founding meeting of the National Federation of Chambers of Commerce, but arrived late and only spoke at the closing banquet. After returning to China, he inspected factories in Shanghai and Nanjing, and planned to establish a specialized office in the United Kingdom to handle liaison with Shanghai. He boarded the Shanghai–Beiping route intending to return to his hometown in Shandong to visit relatives and survey local products for export overseas. Afterward, Wang Xiaolai, then a supervisor of the Shanghai Chamber of Commerce, lamented: "His business unfinished, he died too soon, leaving his colleagues in tears".

The crash also killed two nuns: Italian Franciscan nun Mary Tariglio and American Catholic missionary nun Elizabeth Cecille of the Congregation of Divine Providence. They were traveling to their missionary posts at the time. Other notable passengers included British national James J. Ross, former head of the Jing'an Temple district of the Shanghai International Settlement police; Qin Bingzhang, acting director of the Northeast refinery of the China National Petroleum Corporation; and Liu Huaiyi, then president of the Northeast Christian Association in Shenyang and a professor at Northeast Theological Seminary. Three American citizens also perished in the accident.

== Aftermath ==
=== Search and rescue ===
After the accident, China National Aviation Corporation requested the United States Navy to dispatch aircraft for search and rescue. Upon flying near Licun, flames could be seen soaring into the sky, while nearby residents scrambled to collect valuables. By the time ground personnel arrived two hours later, all valuables had been looted. The scene was strewn with mutilated bodies, and the tail section was still burning. The aircraft's right wing and right landing gear remained on the mountaintop, with long streaks of black oil residue and fuel tanks visible. The fuselage lay upside down in a mountain hollow, while the nose had plunged into a ravine and burned intensely, resembling molten tin and iron.

=== Handling of remains ===
On 9 January, the first group of 22 relatives of the victims arrived in Qingdao from Shanghai on a chartered aircraft. Prior to departure, China National Aviation Corporation stated that "the company bears no responsibility for passengers who perished in accidents occurring during the suspension period while traveling to Qingdao". By the 16th, CNAC records showed that 14 bodies had been claimed by relatives in Qingdao; 8 bodies bound for Beiping and 4 for Shanghai were awaiting shipment by sea on the 17th to Tianjin and Shanghai respectively, with seven or eight family members waiting aboard the Tianjin-bound passenger ship to identify them. An additional 8 unclaimed bodies were buried by the company in a Qingdao cemetery.

=== Accident investigation ===
The Aviation Committee in Nanjing dispatched Chinese and American experts to jointly investigate the crash site. A participating American pilot noted that due to heavy fog, ground targets were difficult to identify, leading the aircraft to descend in altitude and collide with the mountain. The right wing and engine separated from the fuselage upon impact; having lost its center of gravity, the fuselage violently struck the mountainside, disintegrated, and the fuel tanks ruptured and ignited. As most passengers were seated toward the front of the fuselage near the fuel tanks, their bodies were burned.

=== Suspension of operations ===
Following the Black Christmas disaster, this was the fourth accident within 11 days involving China National Aviation Corporation and Central Air Transport Corporation, resulting in a total of 113 deaths. Against this backdrop, the Ministry of Communications ordered both airlines to suspend all flights for one week. As a one-week suspension would have caused losses of 1.5 billion yuan for CNAC and 800 million yuan for Central Air Transport Corporation, enough to bankrupt them, the companies petitioned the Ministry to allow limited resumption of mail and cargo services, which was approved.

After operations resumed, further accidents followed: on 25 January, CNAC Flight 138 from Hong Kong to Chongqing went missing and crashed, and on 28 January, CNAC Flight 145 from Wuhan to Chongqing also disappeared and crashed. Consequently, the Ministry of Communications ordered another suspension on 30 January, with flights not resuming until 16 March. Between December 1946 and January 1947, China's civil aviation sector experienced eight air accidents, resulting in 136 casualties, second only to the United States, which recorded 16 accidents and 139 casualties during the same period.

== Related scam ==
According to a 25 January 1947 report in Shen Bao, Du Jianshi, mayor of Tianjin, encountered a man surnamed Li who claimed to be a nephew of Li Mingyang and a 14th-term graduate of the Baoding Military Academy. He stated that he had been introduced by Chen Cheng to meet Du and sought a position within Tianjin's police administration. He further claimed to have been a passenger on Flight 121, asserting that during the crash he climbed onto the top of the aircraft from the lavatory and thereby escaped death.

However, when Du requested a letter of introduction from Chen Cheng, Li claimed it had been lost in the crash. Du responded that there were no vacancies in the police department and that he would not permit him to solicit money or benefits. After leaving the government office, Li encountered numerous reporters and widely publicized himself as a regimental commander of the 96th Army of the National Revolutionary Army, claiming to be staying at the Huizhong Hotel in Tianjin. After these claims appeared in newspapers the following day, subsequent attempts to locate him found no such person.
