= Li Weikang =

Chinese opera actress (1947–2026)

- 李维康
- Born: 21 February 1947; Beijing, China
- Died: 28 August 2026 (aged 79)
- Occupations: Opera singer; actress; professor; political figure
- Years active: 1966–2020s
- Employers: National Peking Opera; National Academy of Chinese Theatre Arts
- Organizations: China Federation of Literary and Art Circles; China Theatre Association
- Style: Peking opera
- Awards: Plum Blossom Award (1984)

Li Weikang (Chinese: 李维康; 21 February 1947 – 28 August 2026) was a Chinese Peking opera singer, a national first-class actress, and a professor at the National Academy of Chinese Theatre Arts. She was also an inheritor of the national intangible cultural heritage, a deputy to the National People's Congress and a member of the Chinese People's Political Consultative Conference. In 1966, near the start of the Cultural Revolution, she joined the Chinese Communist Party. Her nationality was Han Chinese.

== Biography ==
On 21 February 1947, Li Weikang was born in Beijing.

From 1966, Li was a member of the National Peking Opera. In 1984, Li won the First China Plum Blossom Award.

As of 2010, in addition to performing Chinese opera, Li was a professor at the National Academy of Chinese Theatre Arts. In 2010, Li performed as Yuji, an imperial consort, in The Hegemon-King Bids His Lady Farewell.

Li was a Peking opera performer who specialized in Dan roles. She served as vice-chairperson of the China Federation of Literary and Art Circles and the China Theatre Association.

Li was married to Geng Qichang. She died on 28 August 2026, at the age of 79.
