= 品子 =

品子, meaning 'level, child', may refer to:

- Pinzi, a novel created by Li Yuru
- Shinako, a feminine Japanese given name
