= Tu Zhen =

Chinese translator (1934–2022)

- 屠珍
- Born: 8 March 1934; Beiping, China
- Died: 21 September 2022 (aged 88); Los Angeles, California, U.S.
- Education: Yenching University; Peking University
- Occupation: Translator
- Spouse: Mei Shaowu (m. 1956–2005)
- Writing career
- Language: Chinese, English
- Period: 1956–2022
- Genre: Novel

Tu Zhen (Chinese: 屠珍; pinyin: Tú Zhēn; 8 March 1934 – 21 September 2022) was a Chinese translator best known for her contributions to the introduction of English literature to Chinese readers. She was a member of the Chinese Peasants' and Workers' Democratic Party and a member of the China Writers Association. She was a professor at the University of International Business and Economics (Beijing). She was a member of the 7th and 8th Beijing Municipal Committee of the Chinese People's Political Consultative Conference.

== Biography ==
Tu was born in Beiping, on 8 March 1934, while her ancestral home is in Changzhou, Jiangsu. She attended Beiping Private Mingming Primary School, Sacred Heart Girls' School and Tianjin Saint John's Girls' School. In 1951, she was admitted to Yenching University. She studied French at the beginning, but switched to English a year later. In the same year, Yenching University was incorporated into Peking University during the adjustment of departments and colleges. So she became a student of Peking University.

After graduating in 1955, Tu was assigned as an interpreter of the Ministry of Foreign Trade. She started to publish works in 1956, and joined the faculty of University of International Business and Economics (Beijing). She joined the China Writers Association in 1982 and later became a member of the PEN International. She retired in 1997.

On 21 September 2022, Tu died in Los Angeles, California, at the age of 88.

== Personal life ==
Tu was married to Mei Shaowu, son of renowned Beijing opera actor Mei Lanfang, he was also a translator.

== Translations ==
- Arthur Miller (2020). A View from the Bridge 桥头眺望 (in Chinese). Shanghai: Shanghai Translation Publishing House. ISBN 9787532783441.
- Arthur Conan Doyle (2018). A Treasury of Sherlock Holmes 福尔摩斯探案精选 (in Chinese). Shanghai: Shanghai Translation Publishing House. ISBN 9787532778270.
- Purdy (2003). Malcolm 马尔科姆 (in Chinese). Shanghai: Yilin Translation Publishing House. ISBN 9787806574294.
