= Liu Housheng =

Chinese theatre director and playwright (1921–2019)

Liu Housheng (Chinese: 刘厚生; January 1921 – 14 May 2019) was a Chinese theatre director, critic, scholar, and playwright. As Vice President of the China Theatre Association, he co-founded the Plum Blossom Award in 1983. He received the Lifetime Achievement Award of the China Theater Awards in 2009.

== Biography ==
Liu was born in Beijing in January 1921 and moved to Shanghai in 1931. He graduated from the National Theatre Academy (国立戏剧专科学校) in Nanjing.

Starting in the 1940s, Liu wrote many plays and published hundreds of articles on theatre research and criticism. In 1946, he was received by Zhou Enlai, who would later become the Premier of China, together with Yue opera star Yuan Xuefen and actress Yu Ling. In 1948, Liu joined Yuan's Xuesheng Troupe (雪声剧团), where he directed the Yue operas The Great Wall and Li Shishi, among others.

After the founding of the People's Republic of China in 1949, Liu worked for the Cultural Bureau of the Shanghai Municipal Government. Working under Zhou Xinfang, he promoted the reform of traditional Chinese operas and helped establish the Shanghai Pingtan Troupe in 1951.

He served as an advisor to the adaptation of The Palace of Eternal Life to Kunqu opera. He also advised in the composition of the Peking opera Cao Cao and Yang Xiu and the Huai opera The Golden Dragon and the Mayfly.

Liu founded the journal Shanghai Theatre and later served as chief editor of the journal People's Theatre (now called China Theatre), as well as Vice President of the China Theatre Association. In 1983, he co-founded the Plum Blossom Award for outstanding theatre and opera performers and served as a judge for many years. It is considered the highest award for Chinese opera.

In 2009, Liu received the Lifetime Achievement Award of the China Theater Awards.

== Personal life ==
Liu was married to Fu Huizhen (傅惠珍). In 2010, the couple donated their collection of several thousand books to the China Theatre Association library, including a precious set of The Collected Works of Lu Xun, which Liu collected in the 1940s directly from Lu Xun's widow Xu Guangping. In 2011, the couple donated their lifetime savings of 500,000 yuan to the China Theatre Association.

Liu died on 14 May 2019 at Peking Union Medical College Hospital, at the age of 98.
