= China National Peking Opera Company =

Background information
- Origin: Beijing, China
- Genres: Peking opera
- Years active: 1955–present
- Website: www.cnpoc.cn

Chinese name
- Traditional Chinese: 中國國家京劇院
- Simplified Chinese: 中国国家京剧院
- Hanyu Pinyin: Zhōngguó Guójiā Jīngjù Yuàn

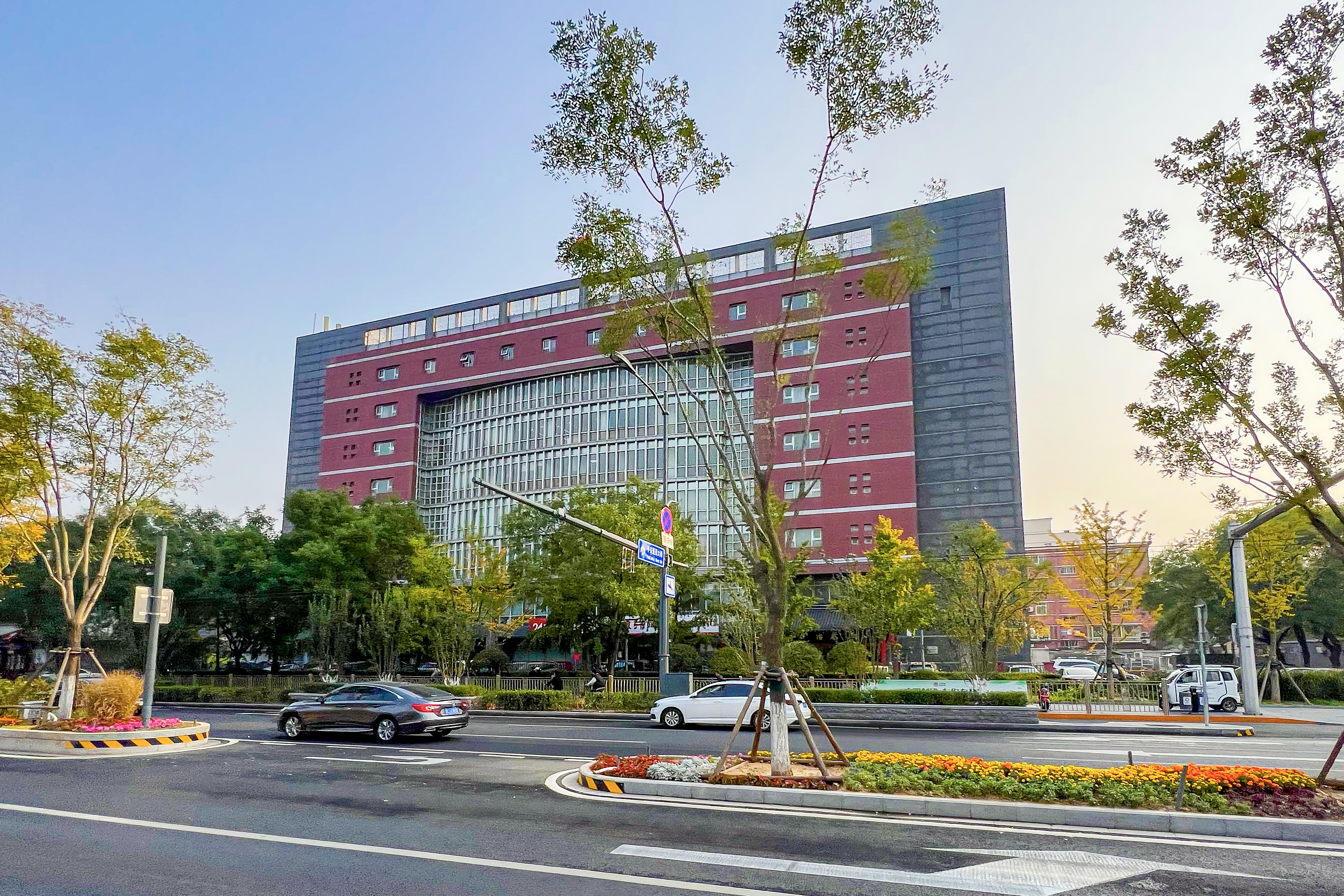
Headquarter building

The China National Peking Opera Company (CNPOC), originally named the National Peking Opera Theater of China, is one of the national ensembles of performance arts directly under the supervision of the Ministry of Culture of the People's Republic of China. Situated in Beijing, it was founded in January 1955, with opera performer Mei Lanfang as its first president. The current president is Song Guanlin.

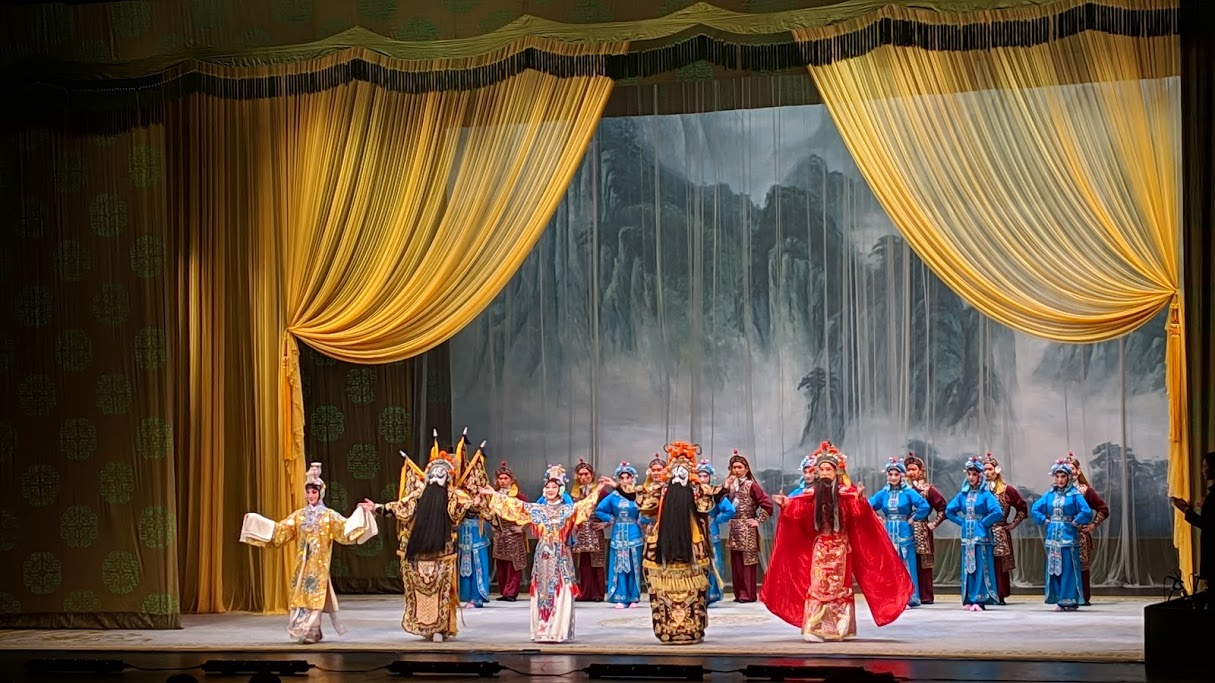
The Hegemon-King Bids His Concubine Farewell starring Li Shengsu (center), Taipei, 20 March 2019

== History ==
As China's premier Peking opera organization, the CNPOC comprises celebrated performers, playwrights, directors, composers and stage designers and has accumulated a repertoire of productions ranging over the wide diversity of Peking Opera performance styles as well as innovative pioneering works. For decades, the National Peking Opera Company has devoted tremendous resources to restoring and preserving existing operatic repertoires, as well as creating new works. The CNPOC consists of three troupes. First troupe was previously led by current vice-president of the company, the celebrated laosheng-performer Yu Kuizhi. The current head of the first troupe is Li Shengsu; second and third troupe are led by Li Haiyan and Zhang Jianguo respectively. Productions staged by these troupes are regularly screened on CCTV11 (The Chinese Central Television's channel for Chinese opera).

In the last fifty years, the CNPOC produced more than 500 traditional or new dramas with different subjects and genres. Its repertoire includes Wild Pig Forest, Three Attacks on Zhu Village, At the Crossroad, Tale of the White Snake, The Mouth of Jiujiang River, Sun An Dong Ben, Xie Yaohuan, Mu Guiying in Command, Monkey King, Man Jiang Hong, The Red Lantern, Chuncao Entering the Court, Die Lian Hua, Nightmare at the Han Palace, Royal Envoy on Thin Horse, Princess Turandot, Lujiang River, Yi-shan Mountain and one of its most famous works, Women Generals of the Yang Family.

The China National Peking Opera Company has visited over 50 countries, such as the United States, Japan, Germany, France, Italy, Hungary, Greece, Romania, the UK, Australia, and the former Soviet Union, and is a frequent performer at the Kennedy Center for the Performing Arts. Since its debut at the Kennedy Center 25 years ago, the company has been invited to perform on several occasions as a main attraction in their programs.
