= Mei Baojiu =

Peking opera artist

- 梅葆玖
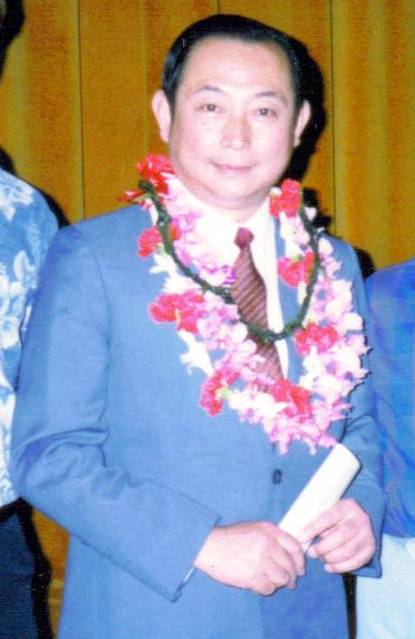
- Mei in 2006
- Born: 29 March 1934; Shanghai, China
- Died: 25 April 2016 (aged 82); Beijing, China
- Occupation: Peking opera artist
- Parents: Mei Lanfang (father); Fu Zhifang (mother)

Mei Baojiu (Chinese: 梅葆玖; pinyin: Méi Bǎojiǔ) (29 March 1934 – 25 April 2016) was a contemporary Chinese Peking opera artist, also a performer of the Dan role type in Peking Opera and Kunqu opera, the leader of Mei Lanfang Peking Opera troupe in Beijing Peking Opera Theatre. Mei's father Mei Lanfang was one of the most famous Peking opera performers. Mei Baojiu was the ninth and youngest child of Mei Lanfang. For this reason, he was called Baojiu, since in Chinese, jiu means nine. Mei Baojiu was the master of the second generation of Méi School descendant, he was also Mei Lanfang's only child who was a performer of the Dan role of the Peking Opera.

From childhood, Mei had learned Peking Opera from many artists. Mei Baojiu's first opera teacher was Wang Youqing (王幼卿), the nephew of Wang Yaoqing (王瑶卿), who had been the teacher of Mei Lanfang. Tao Yuzhi (陶玉芝) was his teacher of martial arts, while Zhu Chuanming (朱传茗), the famous performer of the Dan role type in Kunqu opera, taught him Kunqu. After that Mei learned the Dan role from Zhu Qinxin (朱琴心). Mei's regular performances of traditional opera include The Hegemon-King Bids His Concubine Farewell, Guifei Intoxicated (貴妃醉酒), Lady General Mu Takes Command (穆桂英挂帅), The story of Yang Guifei (太真外传), Luo Shen (洛神), Xi Shi (西施), etc. Mei has made significant contributions to cultural exchanges and promoting Peking Opera culture. Meanwhile, he also trains more than twenty students, such as Li Shengsu (李胜素), Dong Yuanyuan (董圆圆), Zhang Jing (张晶), Zhang Xinyue (张馨月), Hu Wenge (胡文阁) (the only male student), Tian Hui (田慧), Wei Haimin.

== Biography ==
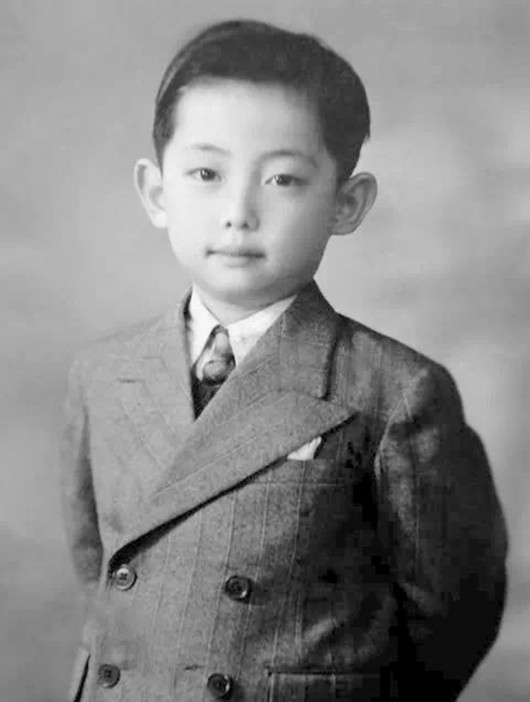
Mei Baojiu as a child

In the spring of 1934, Mei Baojiu was born at No. 87 Sinan Road, Shanghai. Because of his comely appearance and delicate voice, his father decided to send Baojiu to learn Peking opera and hoped that Baojiu could make contributions to Méi School. Baojiu himself also showed great interest as well as gifts in Peking opera in his early life. In 1942, Mei Lanfang and his wife Fu Zhifang (福芝芳) invited Wang Youqing (王幼卿), the disciple of famous Dan role performer - Wang Yaoqing (王瑶卿), from Beijing to teach Baojiu as his first qingyi teacher while requesting Zhu Chuanming (朱传茗), one of the most prestigious performers of the Dan role type to teach Baojiu Kunqu Opera. When Mei Lanfang was free from work, he also gave directions to his son himself.

When Baojiu was ten years old, he played Xue Yi (薛倚) in San Niang teaches the child (三娘教子) as his first performance in Shanghai. At the age of twelve, together with his sister Mei Baoyue (梅葆玥), Baojiu acted in Yang Silang Visits His Mother (四郎探母). Being a Qingyi (青衣) performer, he started giving performances of the Legend of the White Snake, The Story Of Su San (玉堂春) and some other traditional plays for charity since the age of 13. He also performed in Wu Jiapo Hill (武家坡) with Baoyue (梅葆玥) at the same time. When Baojiu was 16, he took part in the national tour of the Mei Lanfang Troupe, and toured the country with the troupe. Usually, Baojiu performed for the first three days, and Mei Lanfang performed plays in the rest, sometimes they also performed cooperatively, such as in Legend of the White Snake. Baojiu played the part of Xiao Qing the green snake, while his father played Bai Suzhen the white snake.

Mei Lanfang used to make suggestions to Baojiu in order to make the performance of Baojiu perfect when Baojiu was young. Once, after watching the play The Story Of Sue San (玉堂春), in which Baojiu performed, he came to Baojiu and suggested that Baojiu change the way of acting the spoken parts. He mentioned that it was the most exciting time when the heroine, Sue San, got the Senior judge. For this reason, Baojiu should speak infectiously, he should speak faster and faster to create tension.

Baojiu also got a chance to share the stage with some prestigious senior performers, such as Xiao Changhua (萧长华), Jiang Miaoxiang (姜妙香) and Yu Zhenfei (俞振飞).

Due to the guidance of the actors from the earlier generation, Mei Baojiu's acting greatly improved and he made a great effort to promote Méi School as well.

In 1961, after Mei Lanfang died, Baojiu took over the position of the leader of Mei Lanfang Peking Opera troupe. During this time, he acted in some other well known plays, such as The mulan (木兰从军), Return of the Phoenix (凤还巢) and Lian Jinfeng (廉锦枫). However, after 1964, almost all performance of traditional plays was forbidden, according to central government regulations. For this reason, Baojiu was forced to do recording and stage lighting related work.

Fourteen years later, in 1978, Baojiu returned to the Mei Lanfang Peking Opera troupe and came back to stage. He reformed the troupe and rearranged many traditional plays like Yuzhoufeng the Sword(宇宙锋), The story of Yang Guifei (太真外传), Luo Shen (洛神), Xi Shi (西施) as well as Royal pavilion (御碑亭) at the same time.

From 1981 to 1984, together with his sister Mei Baoyue and descendants of other schools, he participated in the performance of a series memorial activities to commemorate his father. Making the eight-hour long play lasts for only three hours, he also rearranged The story of Yang Guifei in the late 1980s.

In 1993, led by Baojiu, the Mei Lanfang Peking Opera troupe visited Taiwan and gave elaborately prepared performances to the public. He has made significant contributions to cultural exchanges and promoting Peking Opera culture.

Baojiu cultivates more than twenty students, such as Li Shengsu, Dong Yuanyuan (董圆圆), Zhang Jing (张晶), Zhang Xinyue (张馨月), Hu Wenge (the only male student), Tian Hui (田慧), Wei Haimin (魏海敏). In the last twenty years, he mainly focused on training these students.

As a member of the National Committee of the Chinese People's Political Consultative Conference (CPPCC), Mei Baojiu put forward a proposal on introducing Peking Opera into elementary schools in 2009.

In March 2012, at the Chinese People's Political Consultative Conference, Mei put forward a proposal on introducing the form of animation into Peking Opera in order to make more teenagers be interested in Peking Opera.

On 26 March 2012, Mei received his Ph.D. from J. F. Oberlin University in Japan.

On 31 March 2016, Mei was hospitalized because of bronchospasm. He died on 25 April 2016, at the age of 82.

== Famous plays ==
Like his father, Mei Baojiu acts Dan role in the following classic Peking opera plays. The Hegemon-King Bids His Concubine Farewell tells the sad love story of Xiang Yu and his favourite concubine Consort Yu when he is surrounded by Liu Bang’s forces. Mei plays the role of Consort Yu. Shang Changrong (the 3rd son of Shang Xiaoyun) once played the role of Xiang Yu as Mei's partner.

Guifei Intoxicated, also named Bai Hua Ting (百花亭), is about Yang Guifei. In this play she drinks down her sorrow because she is irritated by Emperor Xuanzong of Tang breaking his promise. Based on Mei Lanfang’s original work, Mei Baojiu adapted this play for The Great Concubine of Tang (大唐贵妃), a contemporary Beijing opera with historical motif in 2002. Mu Guiying Takes Command, a classic Yu opera was adapted by Mei Lanfang in 1959, and he acted the leading role the same year in celebration of the 10th anniversary of PRC.

Cooperating with famous Yu opera master Ma Jinfeng (马金凤), Mei Baojiu performed this play in the Shuang xia guo style (双下锅), which means different forms of opera performed in one play.

== Family ==
Mei Baojiu's mother, Fu Zhifang (福芝芳), the second wife of Mei Lanfang, bore 9 children, but only 4 of them survived.

Mei Baojiu is the youngest child in his family. His eldest brother, Mei Baochen (梅葆琛) (1925–2008), was a senior engineer in Beijing's Academy of Architecture (北京建筑设计院). His elder brother, Mei Shaowu (梅绍武) (1928–2005), was a researcher of the Chinese academy of social sciences institute of the United States (中国社会科学院美国研究所) and the president of Mei Lanfang Culture-art Seminar (中国梅兰芳文化艺术研究会). His elder sister Mei Baoyue (梅葆玥) (1930–2000) was a performer of the Laosheng role type in Peking Opera, and performed together with Mei Baojiu sometimes. Mei Baojiu is the only heir to the Meipai Qingyi (梅派青衣).

Mei Baojiu's wife is named Lin Liyuan (林丽媛), she is the consultant of Mei Lanfang Troupe. They have no children.
