= Mei Shaowu =

Chinese translator, author and scholar

- 梅绍武
- Born: Mei Baozhen (梅葆珍); December 22, 1928; Beijing, China
- Died: September 28, 2005 (aged 76); Beijing, China
- Education: Yenching University; Hangchow University
- Occupations: Translator, scholar, author
- Spouse: Tu Zhen (m. 1956–2005)
- Relatives: Father: Mei Lanfang; Mother: Fu Zhifang
- Writing career
- Language: Chinese, English
- Period: 1952–2000
- Genre: Novel
- Notable work: My Father: Mei Lanfang

Mei Shaowu (simplified Chinese: 梅绍武; traditional Chinese: 梅紹武; pinyin: Méi Shàowǔ; 22 December 1928 – 28 September 2005) was a Chinese translator, author and scholar who was honorary president of the Mei Lanfang Memorial Hall (梅兰芳纪念馆) and president of the Mei Lanfang Literature and Art Research Association (梅兰芳文化艺术研究会). He also was a researcher in the Chinese Academy of Social Sciences.

Mei was the first person from China to translate the works of the American novelist Vladimir Nabokov to Chinese language.

Mei was a member of the 6th, 7th, 8th, and 9th National Committee of the Chinese People's Political Consultative Conference.

== Biography ==
Mei was born Mei Baozhen (梅葆珍; Méi Bǎozhēn) in December 1928 in Beijing, with his ancestral home in Taizhou, Jiangsu, the son of Fu Zhifang (福芝芳), a Beijing opera actress, and Mei Lanfang, also a Beijing opera actor. His elder brother, Mei Baochen (梅葆琛) (1925 - 2008), an architect who was graduated from Aurora University. His younger brother, Mei Baojiu, a Beijing opera actor, was born in 1934. His younger sister, Mei Baoyue (梅葆玥) (1930 - 2000), a Beijing opera actress who graduated from Aurora University.

Mei primarily studied in Shanghai.

During the Second Sino-Japanese War, Mei Lanfang escaped from Beijing and settled in Hong Kong, Mei and his brother attended Lingnan Secondary School (岭南中学).

When Hong Kong was occupied by the Imperial Japanese Army, Mei went to Guiyang, Guizhou, he studied at Qinghua High School (清华中学).

Mei entered Hangchow University in 1946, majoring in engineering at the Department of Engineering.

In 1947, Mei was admitted to Yenching University, majoring in English at the Department of Western Languages, he took French and German as elective courses. After graduating in 1952 he was appointed to the Beijing Library (北京图书馆), then he was transferred to the Chinese Academy of Social Sciences.

Mei died of colon cancer at Beijing Tumour Hospital on September 28, 2005.

== Works ==
- Memoirs of Mei Lanfang (梅兰芳自叙)
- Beijing opera and Mei Lanfang (京剧与梅兰芳)
- My Father: Mei Lanfang (我的父亲梅兰芳)

== Translations ==
- A Hungarian Nabob (Jokai Mor) (一个匈牙利富豪)
- Poetry of Pottier (Eugene Pottier) (鲍狄埃诗选)
- Puning (Vladimir Nabokov) (普宁)
- Pale Fire (Vladimir Nabokov) (微暗的火)
- Salem Witch (Arthur Miller) (萨勒姆的女巫)
- The Thin Man (Dashiell Hammett) (瘦子)
- The Selected Works of Sherlock Holmes (Conan Doyle) (福尔摩斯探案精选)

== Awards ==
- National Book Award
- Chinese Translation Association – Competent Translator (2004)

== Personal life ==
Mei married translator Tu Zhen (屠珍) in 1956 in Beijing, she was a graduate of Peking University, where she majored in French language.
