= Pu Cunxin =

Chinese actor

- 濮存昕
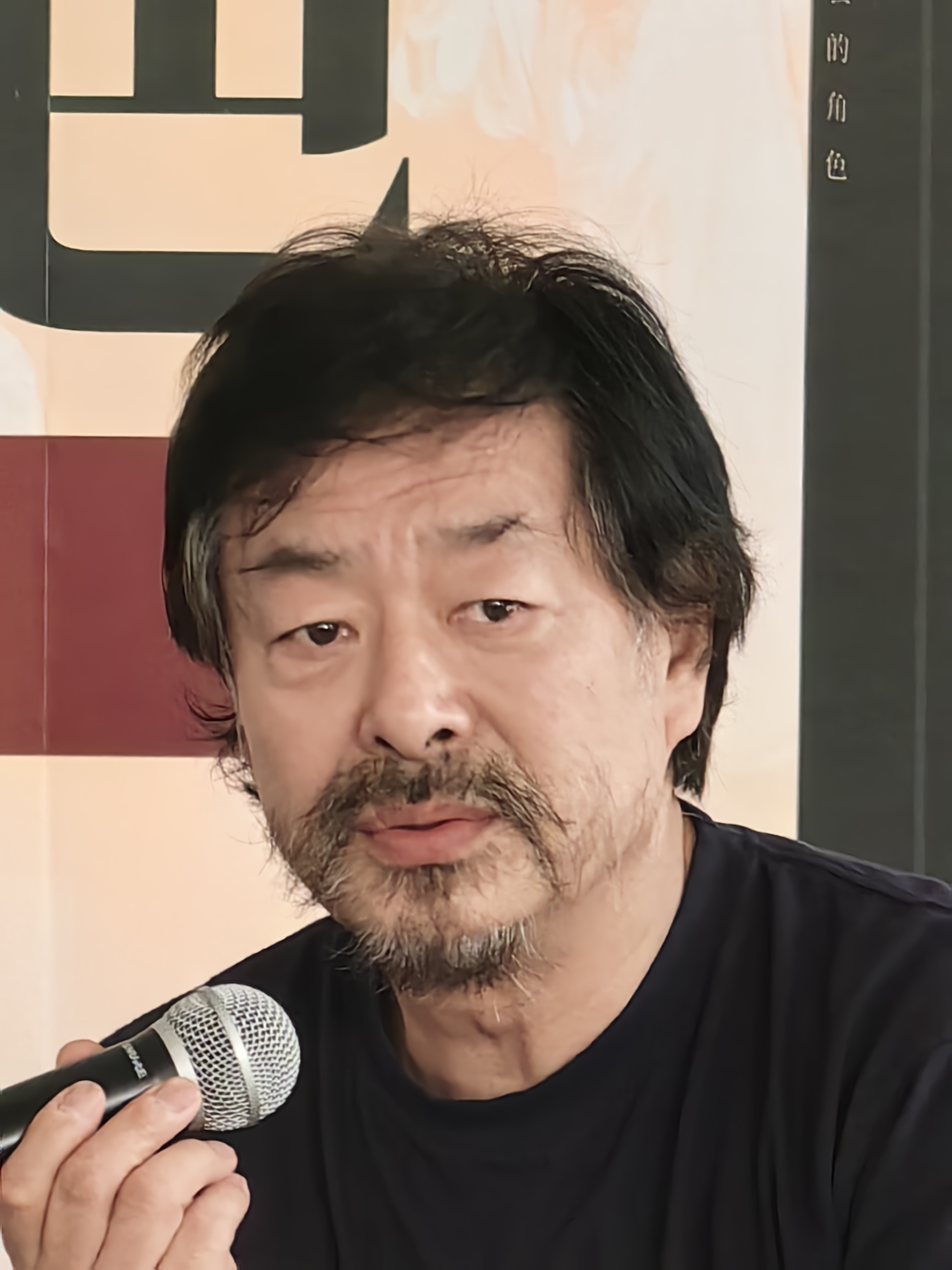
- Pu at 2023 Beijing Book Fair

Vice-President of China Federation of Literary and Art Circles
- Incumbent
- Assumed office 3 December 2016
- President: Tie Ning

Chairman of China Theatre Association
- Incumbent
- Assumed office 16 July 2015
- Preceded by: Shang Changrong

Personal details
- Born: 31 July 1953 (age 72) Beijing, China
- Party: Chinese Communist Party
- Spouse: Wan Ping (m. 1981)
- Children: 1 son
- Parent: Su Min
- Occupation: Actor

Chinese name
- Chinese: 濮存昕
Transcriptions
Standard Mandarin
- Hanyu Pinyin: Pǔ Cúnxīn
Yue: Cantonese
- Jyutping: Buk6 Cyun4jan1

Pu Cunxin (Chinese: 濮存昕; born 31 July 1953) is a Chinese actor. A renowned performance artist with the Beijing People's Art Theatre, he has served as chairman of China Theatre Association since July 2015.

== Biography ==
Pu had a rough childhood. He could not walk normally because he had poliomyelitis when he was 2 years old. Pu's classmates always made fun of him, called him "Pu cripple". At the age of 9, Pu received a surgery for his leg, enabling him to walk normally. He was sad about his nickname, but he never gave up on his life or blamed anyone, he worked hard on everything to prove that he was as good as his peers. He said, "I can walk normally without walking stick after 9 years old. I wanted to leave the school as soon as possible so that none can ever call me 'Pu Cripple'. It was obvious hurts me. But the most important thing is I have to face myself, now I can run and play basketball just like others." The reason he became an actor is because of his father. Pu's father (Su min, Chinese name: 苏民) was a famous actor in Beijing. Pu always followed his father to the theater for his performances. Pu fell in love with acting day by day, eventually becoming an actor himself.

He became the chairman of China Theatre Association in July 2015, and was re-elected in December 2020. In December 2016, he was elected vice-president of China Federation of Literary and Art Circles.

== Book ==
Pu wrote an autobiography in 2008 called "I know where the light is" (我知道光在哪里) In the autobiography, he wrote 3 session about his childhood, how he became an actor, and after he became an actor.

== Philanthropy ==
Pu is also a philanthropist. In 2002, he received a reward from Moving China (a program held by China Central Television annually) for his contributions to AIDS prevention. Pu founded "Pu Cunxin Loving fund" to help children in poor areas receive education and/or medical treatment.

== Filmography ==
=== Films ===
Year	English title	Original title	Role
1991	Bell of Purity Temple	清涼寺的鐘聲	Master Mingjing
1993	The Blue Kite	藍風箏	Lin Shaolong
1998	Shower	洗澡	Liu Daming
1999	Agreed Not to Separate	說好不分手	Teng Yuanfeng
2005	A Bright Moon	一輪明月	Master Hongyi
2005	Lu Xun	魯迅	Lu Xun
2008	Three Kingdoms: Resurrection of the Dragon	三國之見龍卸甲	Zhuge Liang
2011	Love for Life	最爱	
2014	The Galaxy on Earth	天河	
2019	Mao Zedong 1949	决胜时刻	Li Zongren

Cultural offices
Previous: Shang Changrong (尚长荣)	Chairman of China Theatre Association; 16 July 2015	Incumbent
