= Zhao Tongshan =

- Traditional Chinese: 趙桐珊
- Simplified Chinese: 赵桐珊
Transcriptions
Standard Mandarin
- Hanyu Pinyin: Zhào Tóngshān
- Wade–Giles: Chao T`ung-shan

Furong Cao
- Chinese: 芙蓉草
- Literal meaning: Hibiscus Grass
Transcriptions
Standard Mandarin
- Hanyu Pinyin: Fúróng Cǎo
- Wade–Giles: Fu-jung Ts`ao

Zhao Tongshan (13 July 1901 – 1966), also known by his stage name Furong Cao, was a Peking opera singer. He was the greatest player of "flowery" female roles (hua dan) of his era and served as a mentor to Li Yuru.
