= Jin Shaoshan =

- Chinese: 金少山
Transcriptions
Standard Mandarin
- Hanyu Pinyin: Jīn Shǎoshān
- Wade–Giles: Chin Shao-shan

Jin Yi
- Chinese: 金义
Transcriptions
Standard Mandarin
- Hanyu Pinyin: Jīn Yì
- Wade–Giles: Chin I

Jin Zhongyi
- Chinese: 金仲义
Transcriptions
Standard Mandarin
- Hanyu Pinyin: Jīn Zhòngyì
- Wade–Giles: Chin Chung-i

Jin Yi or Zhongyi (1889–13 August 1948), better known by his stage name Jin Shaoshan, was a Manchu Peking opera singer.

== Life ==
Jin's father was Jin Xiushan (金秀山, Jīn Xiùshān), who also a Peking opera singer.

Jin was best known for his "painted face" roles (t 花臉, s 花脸, p huāliǎn) and served as a mentor to Li Yuru.
