= Wei Hai-min =

Taiwanese Peking opera singer (b. 1957)

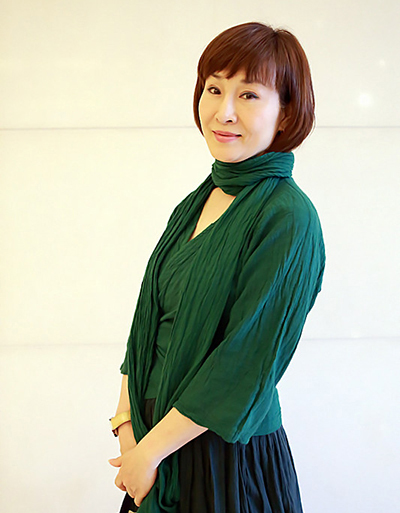
Wei Hai-min

Wei Hai-min (Chinese: 魏海敏; born 1957) is a Taiwanese Peking opera singer-actress who plays Dan roles. A winner of Taiwan's National Award for Arts and China's Plum Blossom Prize, Wei is a widely recognized Peking opera superstar. She is the first student of Mei Baojiu, who is one of the most well-known Peking opera masters in the world.

Wei Hai-min shot to fame in the 1980s with Wu Hsing-kuo's Contemporary Legend Theatre, known for adapting Western classics into Peking opera. In the 1990s she became the leading diva of the newly founded GuoGuang Opera Company. In 2009 she worked with Robert Wilson on a Peking opera adaptation of Orlando: A Biography, where she played an androgynous character — rare for female performers in this genre.

== Filmography ==
Year	English title	Original title	Role	Notes
1977	Orthodox Chinese Kung Fu	名門正派		
1978	The 72 Desperate Rebels	七十二煞星	Liu Mei'er	
1995	Confucius	孔子傳	Nan Zi	Voice role
2014	Design 7 Love	相愛的七種設計	Mark's aunt	
2018	Kafka's Lovers	XOXO卡夫卡		
