= Tang Yunsheng =

Chinese opera singer (1903–1971)

- Traditional Chinese: 唐韻笙
- Simplified Chinese: 唐韵笙
Transcriptions
Standard Mandarin
- Hanyu Pinyin: Táng Yùnshēng
- Wade–Giles: T`ang Yün-sheng

Tang Yunsheng (28 December 1903 – 13 March 1971) was a renowned Chinese Peking opera singer, playwright, and founder of the Tang school of Peking opera (京剧唐派).

== Life ==
Tang was best known for his "old man" roles (老生, lǎoshēng). He served as a mentor to Li Yuru.
