= Guanghe Theatre =

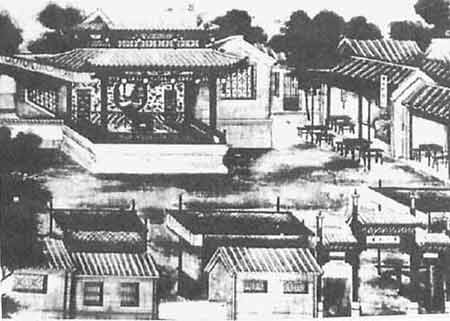
Drawing of the original Guanghe Tea House, its courtyard and its stage

The Guanghe Theatre (Chinese: 广和剧场; pinyin: Guǎnghé Jùchǎng) is a theatre located in the Qianmen district of Beijing that was a long-time host to Beijing opera performances and the site of the beginning of Mei Lanfang's career when he was ten years old. It is the oldest theatre in the city.

== History ==
Initially the building, which was built during the late Ming dynasty (1368–1644), was home to a rich salt merchant, but it was turned into theatre in the last years of the reign of the Qianlong Emperor (1711–1799) in the Qing dynasty and showed Beijing opera performances as late as the 1970s.

After that, audiences dwindled despite attempts to regain visitors by organizing dances and film screenings in the 1980s and the theatre fell into disuse; Since the reform and opening up, many old theaters have been turned into ashes in the bulldozers of urban construction, but Guanghe Building has been spared from disaster. In order to maintain its livelihood, it has let go of movies, hosted a ballroom dance competition, and once played the game hall. Since 1996, no Beijing opera performances have been held there.

The building was closed down before it was declared unsafe in 2000. On April 23, 2007 Chinese state media reported that the historic building would be demolished and replaced with a more modern venue at another location.
