= Xi Xiaobo =

- Traditional Chinese: 奚嘯伯
- Simplified Chinese: 奚啸伯
Transcriptions
Standard Mandarin
- Hanyu Pinyin: Xī Xiàobó
- Wade–Giles: Hsi Hsiao-po

Xi Xiaobo (1910–1977) was a Peking opera singer.

== Life ==
Xi was best known for his "old man" roles (老生, lǎoshēng) and was considered one of Peking Opera's "Four Great Beards" (t 四大鬚生, s 四大须生, p Sì Dà Xūshēng), along with Tan Fuying, Yang Baosen, and Ma Lianliang. He served as a mentor to Li Yuru.
