= The Drunken Royal Concubine =

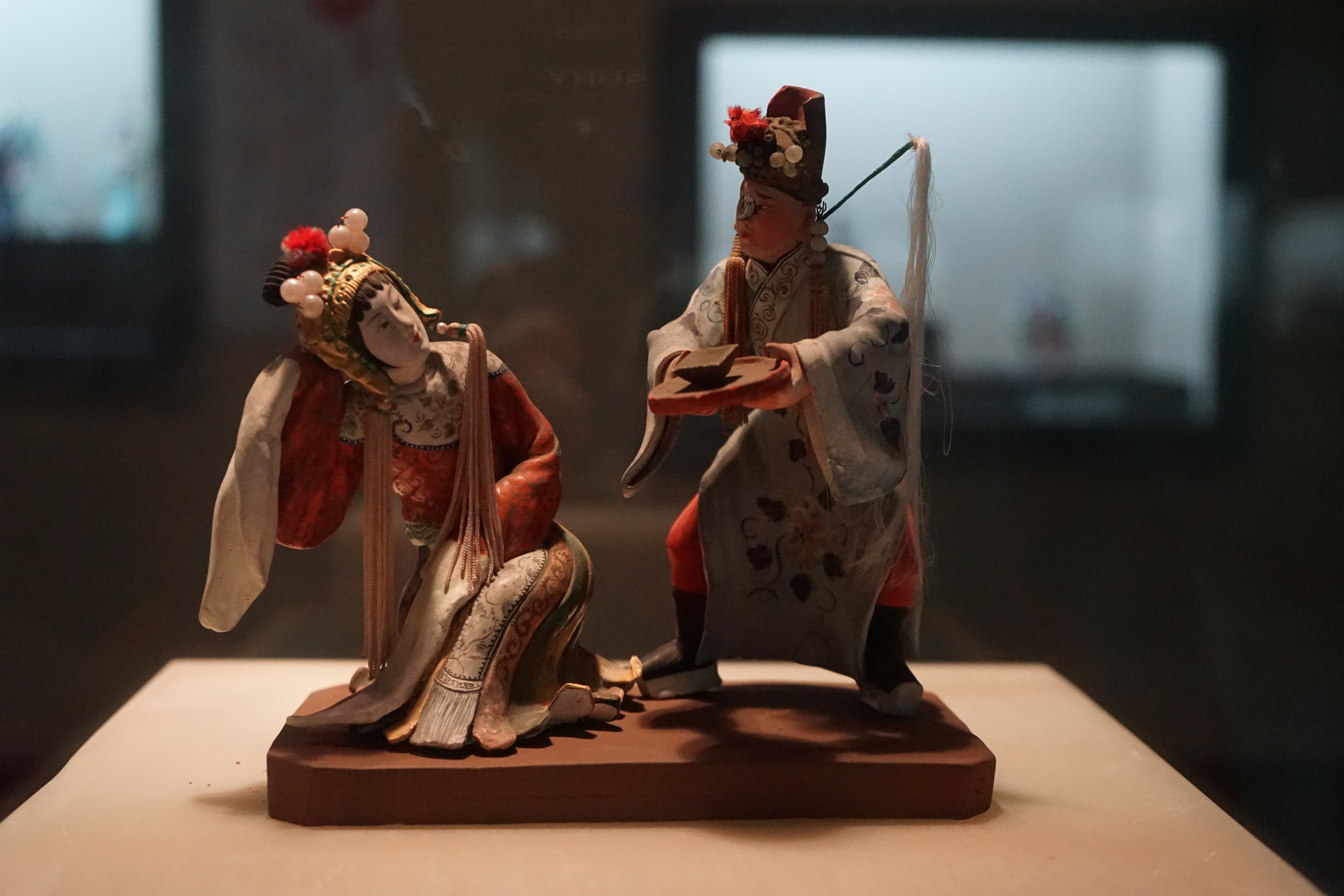
Huishan clay figurine The Drunken Royal Concubine, in the collection of Wuxi Museum.

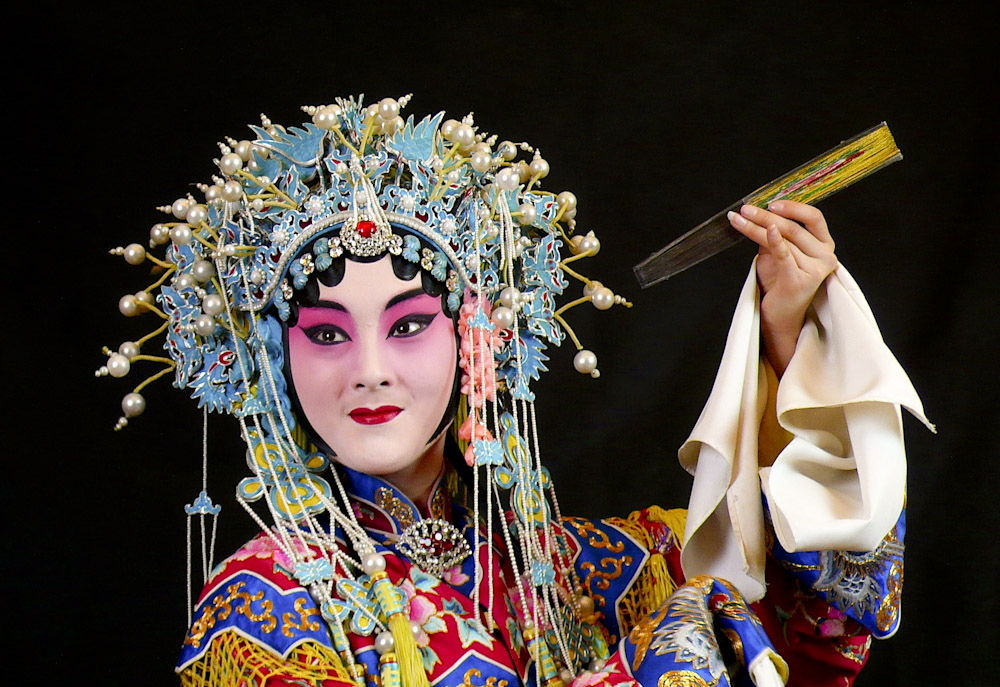
Performance of Peking Opera The Drunken Royal Concubine

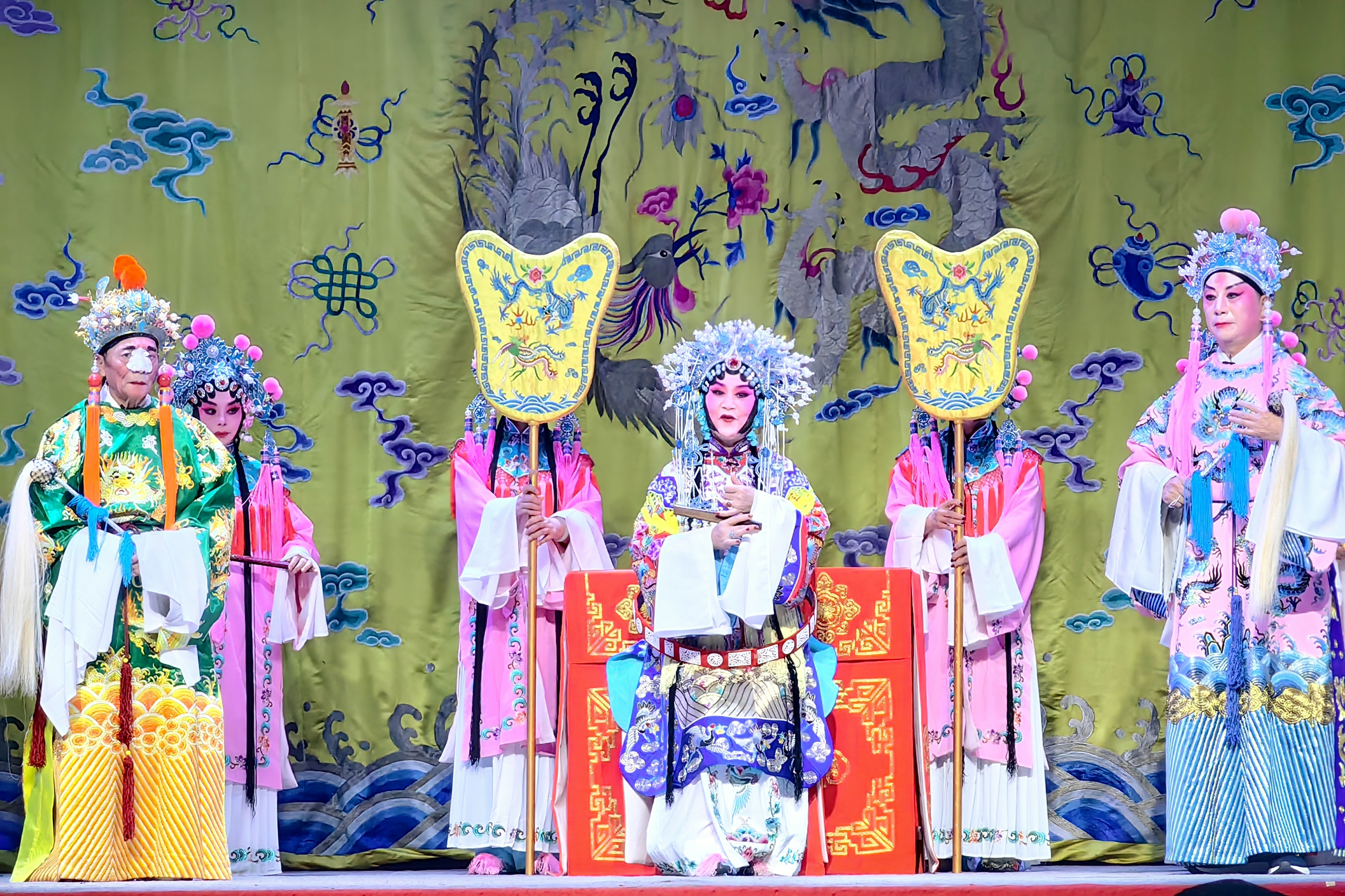
The actor on the left with a small white patch on his nose plays Gao Lishi.

The Drunken Royal Concubine (Chinese: 貴妃醉酒), also known as The Hundred Flowers Pavilion (百花亭), is a single‑act multiple scenes Peking opera. Its story is drawn from the life of Yang Guifei (楊貴妃, aka Yang Yuhuan), the celebrated consort of the Tang dynasty. The piece became widely known through the creative adaptation and performances of the renowned Peking‑opera master Mei Lanfang, and it is regarded as one of the signature works of the Mei school.

== Plot ==
The Drunken Royal Concubine is a single‑act excerpt (折子戲), a short, self‑contained piece without complex scene changes or extended shifts in time and place. The entire action unfolds in the garden of the Hundred Flowers Pavilion, focusing on Yang Guifei’s emotional arc — from anticipation, to shock, to despair. The time span of the drama is brief, and a full performance typically lasts 50 to 60 minutes. The storyline is simple, yet the emotional intensity is profound.

=== Scene 1: Awaiting the Emperor with Joy ===
On the previous day, Emperor Xuanzong (Li Longji) had promised Yang Guifei that he would join her at the Hundred Flowers Pavilion to enjoy flowers and fine wine. On the appointed day, Yang Guifei appears in full ceremonial splendor, accompanied by palace maids and eunuchs. She arranges the imperial banquet with meticulous care and waits with heartfelt delight for the emperor’s arrival.

Musically, this section is dominated by vocal performance, centered on the graceful and unhurried Sipingdiao (四平調) melody (notably the aria “Haidao Binglun”). The music highlights her poise, confidence, and serene happiness.

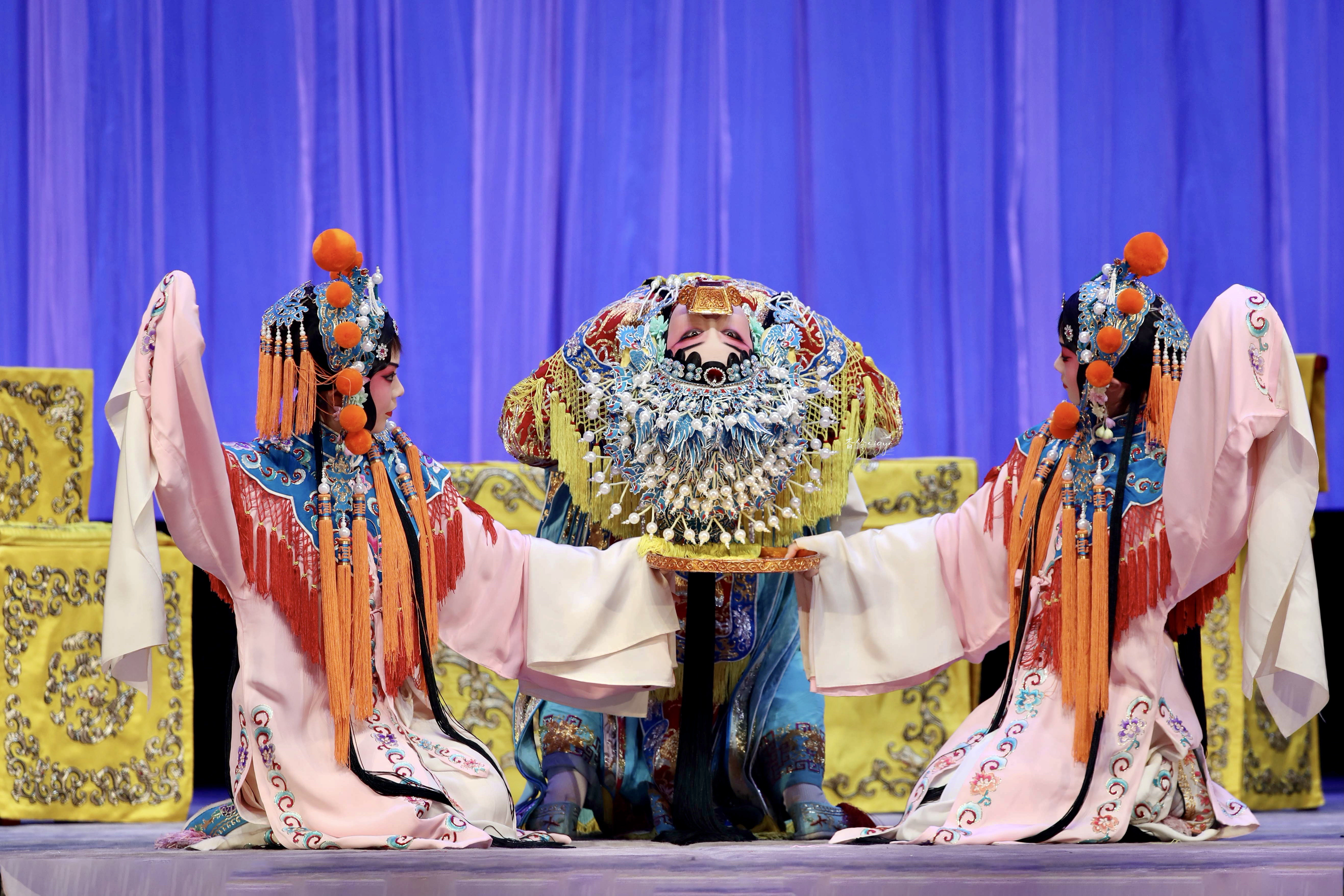
The performance of the concubine holding a cup in the mouth while drunk

=== Scene 2: The Shocking News ===
Time passes, yet Emperor Xuanzong does not appear. Yang Guifei’s initial excitement turns into anxiety; she repeatedly climbs to higher vantage points to look out, but sees only flowers and birds — no imperial procession. Eunuchs Gao Lishi (高力士) and Pei Lishi (裴力士) attend her cautiously.

Gao Lishi is sent to inquire and returns with devastating news: the emperor has not come to the pavilion at all, but has instead diverted his carriage to the Western Palace, where he is drinking with Consort Mei (江采蘋, Jiang Caiping). The revelation strikes Yang Guifei like a thunderbolt. Her emotions collapse—joy turns to fury, shame, and grief. Realizing she has been neglected, she begins drinking to drown her sorrow.

Overwhelmed by the pain of losing favor, she orders Gao Lishi and Pei Lishi to keep refilling her cup. The performance uses a series of high‑difficulty physical movements — such as xianbei (銜杯, lit. holding a cup in the mouth), xiayao (下腰, deep backbend), and woyu (臥魚, lit. "lying fish" pose) — to portray her progression from mild intoxication to complete drunkenness. As the alcohol takes hold, she breaks decorum, teasing and tormenting the eunuchs and maids. Her drunken behavior alternates between lamentation and bursts of anger, revealing her profound inner turmoil.

Musically, this section shifts to instrumental dominance, driven by huqin set pieces and complex percussion patterns. After learning the emperor will not come, Yang Guifei has almost no extended sung passages; instead, her emotional breakdown is expressed through movement rather than vocal lines.

=== Scene 3: Returning to the Palace in Drunken Despair ===
Now fully drunk, Yang Guifei continues to express her anguish through demanding physical choreography—woyu, xianbei, xiayao, and other stylized movements. Although her drunkenness allows brief moments of wild release, it cannot change the reality of her abandonment. With Pei Lishi’s gentle persuasion and support, she finally leaves the pavilion, carrying her sorrow and loneliness back to the palace. Behind her remain scattered blossoms and half‑finished wine cups.

Musically, the final section returns to vocal performance, forming a stark contrast with the opening. As Yang Guifei resumes singing, the concluding arias echo the earlier Sipingdiao but now transformed—emptied of their former elegance, filled instead with hollowness and lament. The contrast between the opening and closing melodies underscores her emotional collapse.

== Sipingdiao ==
Although The Drunken Royal Concubine begins and ends with the same melodic framework, Sipingdiao (四平調), the two appearances of this tune differ sharply in tempo, melodic contour, vocal ornamentation, and above all emotional atmosphere. At the start, Sipingdiao evokes an ethereal scene at the Hundred Flowers Pavilion, creating an atmosphere "as if Chang'e had descended from the Ninth Heaven." By contrast, the closing Sipingdiao evokes a desolate, dream‑shattered "Cold Palace," akin to awakening alone in the empty Guanghan Palace.

== Adaptation ==
In 2002, Mei Baojiu and fellow artists reworked Mei Lanfang’s classic plays The Drunken Concubine and The Story of Taizhen into a major symphonic Peking Opera titled The Tang Concubine. Co‑produced by the Shanghai Peking Opera Theatre, the China Peking Opera Theatre, and the Beijing Peking Opera Theatre, the production featured expansive sets and large‑scale staging. It represented one direction in the ongoing modernization of Peking Opera, integrating orchestral elements and grand visual design.
