= Meng Guanglu =

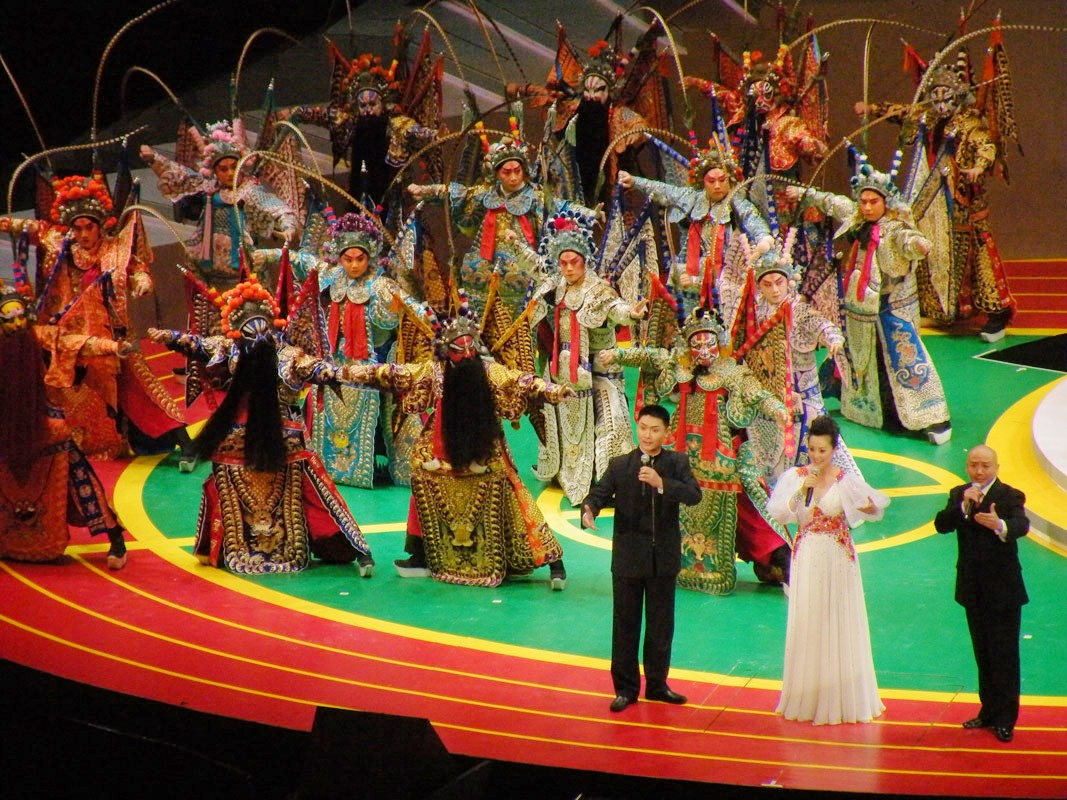
- Meng Guanglu (far right) singing during the closing ceremony of the 2009 East Asian Games in Hong Kong.

Background information
- Born: 1963 (age 61–62)
- Origin: China
- Genres: Peking opera
- Occupation(s): Singer, actor

Meng Guanglu (born 1963) is a Chinese Peking opera performer who specializes in Jing roles. He is a student of the master Qiu Shengrong.

Meng Guanglu has won the Plum Blossom Prize twice. He is a current vice-chairman of China Theatre Association and a deputy president of China Federation of Literary and Art Circles.
