= Ma Lianliang =

Chinese opera singer

- Traditional Chinese: 馬連良
- Simplified Chinese: 马连良
Transcriptions
Standard Mandarin
- Hanyu Pinyin: Mǎ Liánliáng
- Wade–Giles: Ma Lien-liang

Ma Lianliang (28 February 1901 – 16 December 1966) was a Peking opera singer.

== Life ==
Ma was best known for his "old man" roles (老生, lǎoshēng) and was considered one of Peking Opera's "Four Great Beards" (t 四大鬚生, s 四大须生, p Sì Dà Xūshēng), along with Tan Fuying, Yang Baosen, and Xi Xiaobo. He served as a mentor to Li Yuru. For most of his life, he stayed in mainland China, except for 1948–1950, when he lived in Hong Kong (which was still a colony of Britain) for medical treatment.

During Mao Zedong's cultural revolution, Ma was named a "poisonous weed" after having appeared in a production that Mao believed implicitly criticized him. A group of revolutionaries called the Red Guards assaulted Ma in the street and broke his leg. Before the end of the year, he would die of his injuries.
