= Shinako =

- Gender: Female

Origin
- Origin: Japanese
- Meaning: Different meanings depending on the kanji used

Shinako (written: 姿子 or 品子) is a feminine Japanese given name. Notable people with the name include:

- Shinako Tanaka (田中 姿子; born 1975), Japanese beach volleyball player
- Shinako Tsuchiya (土屋 品子; born 1952), Japanese politician
