= Tan Fuying =

- Traditional Chinese: 譚富英
- Simplified Chinese: 谭富英
Transcriptions
Standard Mandarin
- Hanyu Pinyin: Tán Fùyīng
- Wade–Giles: T`an Fu-ying

Tan Fuying (15 October 1906 – 22 March 1977) was a Peking opera singer.

== Life ==
Tan was best known for his "old man" roles (老生, lǎoshēng) and was considered one of Peking Opera's "Four Great Beards" (t 四大鬚生, s 四大须生, p Sì Dà Xūshēng), along with Ma Lianliang, Yang Baosen, and Xi Xiaobo. He served as a mentor to Li Yuru.
