= Yang Baosen =

Peking opera singer

- Born: 9 October 1909
- Died: 10 February 1958 (aged 48)

Chinese name
- Traditional Chinese: 楊寶森
- Simplified Chinese: 杨宝森
Transcriptions
Standard Mandarin
- Hanyu Pinyin: Yáng Bǎosēn
- Wade–Giles: Yang Pao-sen

Yang Baosen (9 October 1909 – 10 February 1958) was a Peking opera singer.

== Life ==
Yang was best known for his "old man" roles (Chinese: 老生; pinyin: lǎoshēng) and was considered one of Peking Opera's "Four Great Beards" (simplified Chinese: 四大须生; traditional Chinese: 四大鬚生; pinyin: Sì Dà Xūshēng), along with Tan Fuying, Ma Lianliang, and Xi Xiaobo. He served as a mentor to Li Yuru.
