= China Theatre Awards =

The China Theatre Awards (中国戏剧奖) are presented by the China Theatre Association, and were established in 2005. This bi-annual event is China's equivalent to the Tony Awards, and comprises the Plum Blossom Prize (梅花奖) for stage performance (founded in 1983) and the Cao Yu Theater Award (曹禺戏剧奖) for writing (founded in 1981).

== Awards Categories ==
- China Theatre Award for Outstanding Play
- China Theatre Award for Outstanding Directing
- China Theatre Award for Outstanding Music

=== Cao Yu Theatre Award ===
- Cao Yu Theatre Award for Outstanding Writing

=== Plum Blossom Prizes ===
- Plum Blossom Prize for Outstanding Performance in a China Opera
- Plum Blossom Prize for Outstanding Performance in a Play
- Plum Blossom Prize for Outstanding Performance in an Opera
