= Ma Fulu (Peking opera) =

Peking opera singer

- Traditional Chinese: 馬富祿
- Simplified Chinese: 马富禄
Transcriptions
Standard Mandarin
- Hanyu Pinyin: Mǎ Fùlù
- Wade–Giles: Ma Fu-lu

Ma Fulu (1900–1969) was a Peking opera singer known for his "educated clown" roles (文丑, wénchǒu). He served as a mentor to Li Yuru.
