= Li Yuru =

Chinese opera singer and actress

- 李玉茹
- Born: 25 July 1923; Beijing, China
- Died: 11 July 2008 (aged 84); Shanghai, China
- Education: National Drama School
- Known for: Peking opera singer
- Children: Li Li (b. 1944); Li Ruru (b. 1952)

Li Yuru
- Chinese: 李玉茹
Transcriptions
Standard Mandarin
- Hanyu Pinyin: Lǐ Yùrú
- Wade–Giles: Li Yü-ju

Li Shuzhen
- Traditional Chinese: 李淑貞
- Simplified Chinese: 李淑贞
Transcriptions
Standard Mandarin
- Hanyu Pinyin: Lǐ Shūzhēn
- Wade–Giles: Li Shu-chen

Li Xueying
- Chinese: 李雪瑩
Transcriptions
Standard Mandarin
- Hanyu Pinyin: Lǐ Xuěyíng
- Wade–Giles: Li Hsüeh-ying

Li Shuzhen (25 July 1923 – 11 July 2008), better known by her stage name Li Yuru and also known as Li Xueying, was a Chinese opera singer and actress. Descended from Manchu nobility, she is remembered as "one of the great Beijing Opera performers" and played an important role in the acceptance of female singers in female roles (dan). Amid the Cultural Revolution, she was imprisoned from 1966 until the early 1970s. In 1979, she married Cao Yu, one of the most important 20th-century Chinese dramatists, and, following China's reform and opening up under Deng Xiaoping, she ended her life respected as one of the few surviving masters of the dan roles.

== Life ==
=== Early life ===
She was born in Beijing on 25 July 1923 (Note: With the goal of concealing her age, however, her parents listed her birth year as 1924 on the registration papers for school and other official documents.) to Zheng Yuanlong (Note: Chinese: t 正元龍, s 正元龙, Zhèng Yuánlóng.) and Li Yuxiu (1900–1966). Li was descended from Manchu nobility but had changed her name to pass as Han following the 1911 Xinhai Revolution that ultimately overthrew the Manchu Qing dynasty. Her father died when she was an infant. When she was five, her mother remarried to a businessman named Jiao Dezhai. (Note: Chinese: t 焦得齋, s 焦得斋, Jiāo Dezhāi.)

The family was poor. When she was 9 or 10, they sent her to the National Drama School (Note: Chinese: t 中華戲曲專科學校, s 中华戏曲专科学校, Zhōnghuá Xìqǔ Zhuānkē Xuéxiào, lit "The Chinese Drama Vocational School" and also known as the "Chinese Theatre School" (Note: From the abbreviated form of its name Zhōnghuá Xìxiào (t 中華戲校, s 中华戏校).) or the "Beijing Theatre School".) to learn a trade and receive meals. This school had been opened in 1930 as the first coeducational opera school in China (Note: The Fuliancheng Training Company (t 富連成, s 富连成, Fùliánchéng) had previously admitted female apprentices in 1912, only to send them home when the Beijing police published an order banning mixed-sex casts from performing. The school, while integrated, continued to exclude women from the "martial" female roles, whose training was considered "too harsh" for teen girls.) and aimed to reform education of Peking opera singers and musicians. For the two centuries before women appeared on Shanghai's stages in the 1870s, female opera roles had been played by men. Because of the association with prostitution, the work was still stigmatized and female students, despite usually being driven into acting by poverty, had previously needed private tutors. The school was a more respectable setting but Jiao adopted her mother's assumed name of Li in order to avoid shaming her father. Along with the other members of the school's fourth class, Li then adopted a stage name incorporating the generation component "jade": Li Yuru. While there, Li memorized plays and participated in "arduous" physical exercises. Her training focused on the "verdant-clad", "flowery", and "sword-and-horse" roles but covered a variety of schools. (Note: Chinese: 流派, liúpài.) She studied six days a week and was permitted family visits on Sundays. Beatings were given for poor behaviour, slow learning, or as part of a collective punishment for a single student's mistake, but teachers were expressly forbidden from striking a student's head.

=== Career ===
Li and the actresses of her generation "played an important role in the development of [Peking Opera] as they transformed the dan into a role also played by females".

She credited her later success to her school's eclectic training but Li's first performance was a disaster. Given a supporting role with four lines six months into her training, she failed to hit the high notes and was noticed and jeered by the audience. For the next five years, she only received walk-on roles. She put the experience to good use: "Through playing extras, I learned the plays that had not been taught to our year. I also observed not only my own character type but also other roles. I familiarized myself with the stage and the audience". She woke at 6 each morning (two hours ahead of the other students) and took extra classes. The audience had also become familiar with her. At age 14, she was given the gown and star role of the Princess in a performance whose lead and understudy had both lost their voices. She later recalled that, when she struck her first pose, before saying a line, "the applause and shouting started. It was so loud that my ears were rin[g]ing. Afterwards, every line I sang or spoke and every eye expression I made would gain a full-house ovation". At 14, she was a "star student" and began "playing all types of leading roles", all the more so because the principal and registrar hadn't realized she'd learned the part ahead of the school's curriculum. Over the course of her training, Li studied about 40 hua dan ("flowery role") plays.

Graduating at age 17 in 1940, she established her own troupe (Note: The Ruyi, Sceptre, or "As You Like It" Troupe (如意社, Rúyì Shè).) with friends from the school. She organised a program of 62 new and traditional plays over a successful 48-day run in Shanghai, starring in 28 of them. Disliking the pressure she came under as an independent young actress, she disbanded the troupe and placed herself under the training and protection of older male actors: Xun Huisheng and Mei Lanfang, two of the "Four Great Dan"; Zhao Tongshan, the greatest "flowery" actor of the time; the "martial clown" Ye Shengzhang; the "educated clown" Ma Fulu; the "painted face" actor Jin Shaoshan; the "martial" actor Li Shaochun; the "Four Great Beards" Ma Lianliang, Tan Fuying, Yang Baosen, and Xi Xiaobo; and the other "old men" Zhou Xinfang and Tang Yunsheng. She also studied under the female impersonators Yu Lianquan and Cheng Yanqiu. The broad range of specialists expanded her repertoire greatly. During this period, Li gave successful performances of The Dragon and the Phoenix, The Courtyard of the Black Dragon, Two Phoenixes Flying Together, and Three Pretty Women. Her career and finances were largely handled by her mother, who was reckoned one of the "Four Famous Mothers" of the opera. (Note: Chinese: 四大名妈, Sì Dàmíng Mā. The other three were the mothers of Li Yanxiu, Liang Xiujian, and Wu Suqiu.) She had her first daughter Li Li in 1944.

Li's mistreatment at the hands of the Japanese and Nationalists led her to "wholeheartedly" support the people's republic founded by the victorious Communists in 1949. Her success despite her poverty, lack of family connections, and avoidance of a rich and powerful patron gave her a clean slate and she was relatively young and famous. Many important cadres, including Zhou Enlai, Chen Yi, and He Long, were fans of Peking opera and made special efforts to cultivate it. During the Communist Theatre Reform (Note: Chinese: t 戲改, s 戏改, xìgǎi.) begun in 1949, Li was selected as a "people's artist", despite many of the "flowery" plays she had trained for being removed from the stage on account of their lack of ideological significance, violence, and sexuality. She performed extensively within China and even toured the Soviet Union and Europe multiple times.

Her second daughter Li Ruru (Note: Chinese: 李如茹, Lǐ Rúrú.) was born in 1952. The same year, she was resting in her dressing room in Wuhan when soldiers appeared to demand she cease her performances of Cheng Yanqiu's Spring Boudoir Dream. (Note: Chinese: t 春閨夢, s 春闺梦, Chūn Guī Mèng.) Amid the Korean War, they thought the dramatisation of a Tang-era poem by Du Fu was completely inappropriate and supported American imperialism. Baffled but scared, she complied and didn't perform it again until the 1980s, when the opposition to Cheng's pacifist themes was long past. Li was then drafted to perform revised versions of traditional plays for Chinese troops in Korea. Her favourite play was The Drunken Imperial Concubine, an account of a night in the life of Yang Guifei during the Tang dynasty. Li performed various roles in it around 200 times, from a bit part at age 11 to the lead in 1993 at age 70. Though it has a minimal story, she appreciated that it was full of dance and movement showing "every phase of the heroine's changing feelings: from sober to drunk, from arrogant and joyful to disappointed to sad to furious". This had been recommended for censorship as a "harmful" play by a 1948 People's Daily editorial, (Note: The complaints included the play's "obscenity, pleasure-seeking, and sexual suggestiveness".) Mei Lanfang worked to sanitize the play and was permitted to perform it to the Chinese troops in Korea in 1953. Not all of the censorship came from the government. She later told her daughter Ruru that "the 'mind re-moulding' was so powerful that the ideology permeated into us. It seemed as if we had a censor in our minds and we voluntarily gave up many plays, which were not on the banning list, because we felt they did not reach the ideological standard that we had learned... and they would not be good for our audiences". In retrospect, she felt ashamed at the lost heritage: "I don't know what I can say to my predecessors when I see them in the other world".

In 1953, Li became part of the Shanghai Peking Opera Troupe, which was combined with several other troupes in 1955 to form the Shanghai Peking Opera Theatre. (Note: Chinese: t 上海京劇院, s 上海京剧院, Shànghǎi Jīngjù Yuàn.) Having "successfully adapted to the contemporary political climate", she began to earn a monthly salary of more than 1,000 RMB and to enjoy much better social status than in pre-war China. The troupe included Tong Zhiling and Yan Huizhu. In the 1950s, Li expanded a one-act scene from the play Princess Baihua into a full Peking opera. She and her colleagues were planning to adapt her version into a full-length play in 1960 when Chen Yi, China's foreign minister at the time, asked that they make a "fundamental change to the premise of the play in order to utilize it for China's Cold War diplomacy." The play would go through "four versions between 1960 and 1961, which was further complicated by the volatile ideological pendulum of the era." Along with Princess Baihua, other memorable performances were her 1958 Marriage Involving a Chest (Gui Zhong Yuan), 1959 Red Plum-Blossom Pavilion (Hongmei Ge), and 1961 Royal Concubine Mei (Mei Fei).

=== Incarceration ===
Since her school days, Li had supported certain revisions of the traditional Peking opera repertoire, particularly the removal of "pink scenes" (Note: Chinese: t 粉戲, s 粉戏, fěnxì.) with overt sexual content. The Theatre Reform did not ban many plays outright, but the reduction of traditional plays being produced caused her to worry about the loss of certain techniques with the passing of the older generation of performers. There was also call for more contemporary plays but Li's experience acting in four of them left her uncomfortable, as the playwrights made little accommodation for the conventions she had been trained to use: "I had nowhere to place my hands, I did not even know how to walk, or what to do on stage". The conventions she did use brought her severe criticism for "defam[ing] the image of members of the working class". Several times, she supported the idea of reserving older genres like Peking and Kun opera for their traditional canon and restricting contemporary plays to newer dramatic forms.

At the onset of the Cultural Revolution in 1966, her mother Li Yuxiu confronted a gang of Red Guards who were destroying statues in her house's courtyard. More than a dozen teenagers then forced themselves into the estate for a week, searching her belongings for old or counter-revolutionary items. When they discovered that she was a Manchu who had assumed a new identity after the fall of the Qing Empire, all her savings based on her daughter's income before 1949 were confiscated. She was then beaten so severely that she died from the injuries. Li Yuru was jailed in an "oxpen" and forced to write confessions of her "crimes" of "bourgeois thought and individualism demonstrated in striving for fame", of a "bourgeois lifestyle" demonstrated "in wearing make-up and fashionable clothes", and of participating in the "counter-revolutionary plays she performed on the stage". She was tortured. Her daughters became sent-down youth, relocated to and forced to labour in the countryside. Li was released in the early 1970s.

=== Later life ===
Li returned to the stage in 1977 and was permitted to headline a traditional opera in September the next year. She also mentored younger actresses and taught students in master classes and seminars. In December 1979, Li married Cao Yu, a Chinese dramatist now known as "the most significant figure in the development of modern drama in China and sometimes compared to Shakespeare, Ibsen, and Chekhov. Being 14 years older, Cao often needed her care before his death in 1996.

In the 1980s, Li began writing. She first produced a full-length play, Love and Hatred, based on Wang Kui's betrayal of Jiao Guiying. She wrote columns for the Xinmin Evening News and Wenhui Daily and, in 1992, serialised the novel Pinzi. (Note: Chinese: 品子, Pǐnzǐ.) This was republished under the title Little Woman the next year and adapted as a 20-episode television miniseries in 1999. She also published two books on Peking opera, both of which she wrote after her second operation for lung cancer in 2007.

In 2007, Li was one of four recipients of the Great Achievement in Performing Arts award from the All-China Association of Literature and Arts, considered one of the "few living masters of the dan role".

Li died on 11 July 2008 in Shanghai.

== Works ==
- 青絲恨／青丝恨 (Qīngsī Hèn; Love and Hatred), 1984. (Note: Literally Verdant (Note: Qing is a colour without direct translation into English. It is a single color of which both green and blue (and, as here, some shades of black) are considered shades. See Blue-green distinction in language.)-haired Hate but more often translated as Love and Hatred or Hatred and Raven Hair.) (in Chinese)
- 小女人 (Xiǎo Nǚrén; Little Woman), 1993. (in Chinese)
- 李玉茹談戲說藝／李玉茹谈戏说艺 (Lǐ Yùrú Tán Xìshuō Yì; Li Yuru on the Art of Peking Opera), 2008. (in Chinese)
- 李玉茹演出劇本選集／李玉茹演出剧本选集 (Lǐ Yùrú Yǎnchū Jùběn Xuǎnjí; Selected Plays from Li Yuru's Repertoire), 2010. (in Chinese)
