= China Theatre Association =

Chinese dramatist association (founded 1949)

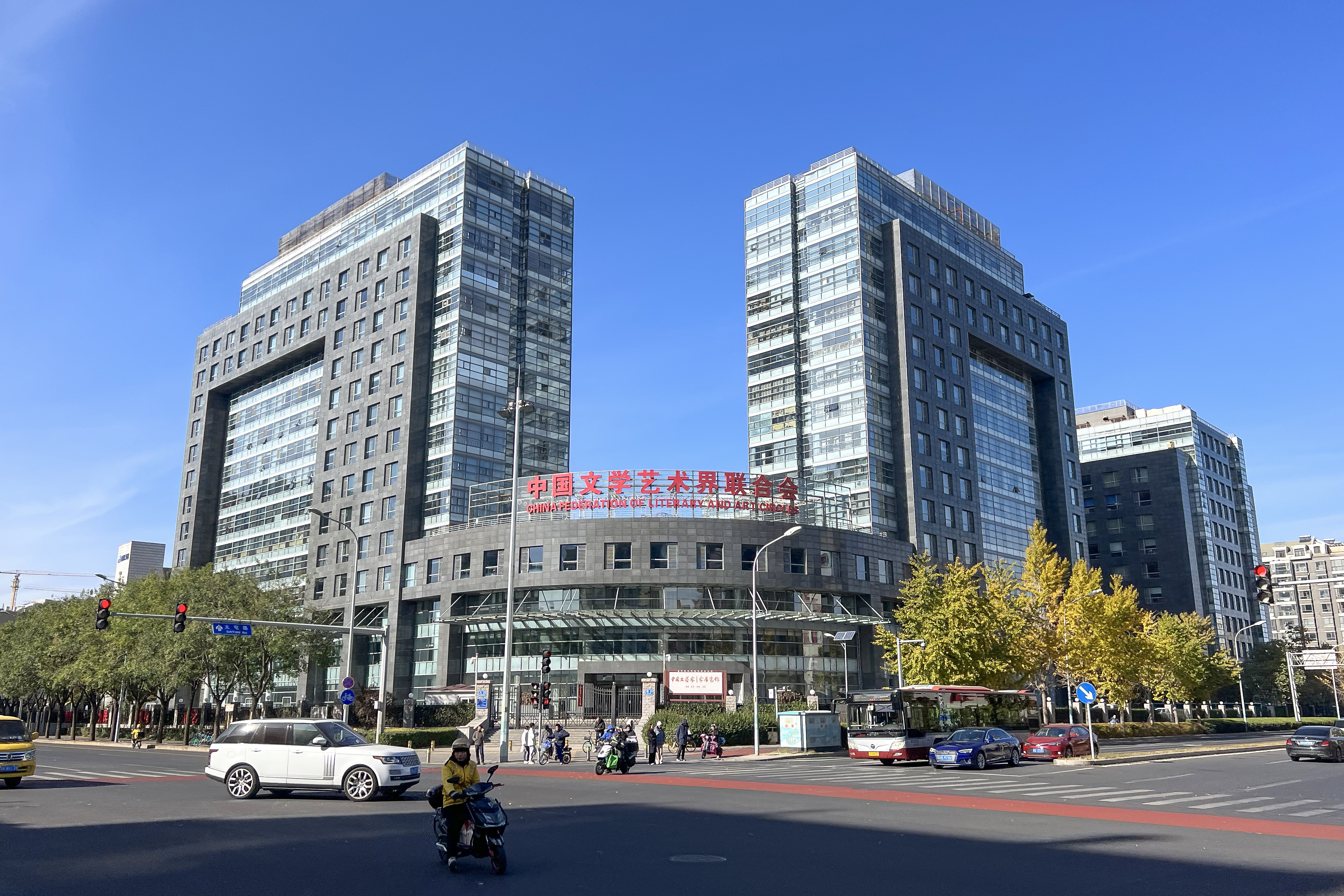
- Traditional Chinese: 中國戲劇家協會
- Simplified Chinese: 中国戏剧家协会
Transcriptions
Standard Mandarin
- Hanyu Pinyin: Zhōngguó Xìjùjiā Xiéhuì

The China Theatre Association is a subordinate of the China Federation of Literary and Art Circles (CFLAC). Founded on July 24, 1949, the organisation was initially named the China National Theatre Workers Association. In 1953, it was renamed the China Theatre Association. So far it has more than 11,000 registered members, with branch associations across the nation.

== History ==
China Theatre Association was founded in July 1949 with the name of China National Theatre Workers Association.

In 1953 China National Theatre Workers Association changed its name to China Theatre Association.

In 1981, it joined the International Association of Artists and founded the Chinese Center.

At the end of 1987, it had more than 7,000 registered members.

In late 2008, it had more than 10,364 registered members.

On 30 June 2005, Plum blossom Award Art Troupe was set up.

On 16 July 2015, Pu Cunxin was chosen as its Chair in the Eighth National Congress of China Theatre Association.

== Major officials ==
- Pu Cunxin (Chairman)
- Shang Changrong (Honorary chairman)
- Yu Kuizhi, Wang Xiaoying, Feng Yuping, Li Shujian, Yang Fengyi, Shen Tiemei, Mao Weitao, Luo Huaizhen, Meng Bing, Meng Guanglu, Liu Ping, and Han Sheng (Vice-Chairman)
- Zhou Guang, Cui Wei, and Zhu Zhengming (Deputy Secretary-General)
- Liu Housheng, former vice chairman

== List of chairmen ==
No.	Portrait	Name	Took office	Left office	Ref
1		Tian Han	July 1949	December 1968	
2		Cao Yu	December 1968	1998	
3		Li Moran	1998	2005	
4		Shang Changrong	2005	16 July 2015	
5		Pu Cunxin	16 July 2015	Incumbent	

== Awards ==
The China Theatre Awards were established in 2005. It comprises the Plum Blossom Prize for stage performance (founded in 1983) and the Cao Yu Theatre Award for writing (founded in 1981).

== Academic journal ==
China Theatre (founded in 1954) was its official journal.
