= Xiao Cuihua =

Chinese opera singer (1900–1967)

- Traditional Chinese: 于連泉
- Simplified Chinese: 于连泉
Transcriptions
Standard Mandarin
- Hanyu Pinyin: Yú Liánquán
- Wade–Giles: Yü Lien-ch`üan

Xiao Cuihua
- Chinese: 小翠花
Transcriptions
Standard Mandarin
- Hanyu Pinyin: Xiǎo Cuìhuā
- Wade–Giles: Hsiao Ts'ui-hua

Yu Lianquan (1900–1967), also known by his stage name Xiao Cuihua, was a Peking opera singer.

== Life ==
Yu was best known for his performance of female roles (dan). He served as a mentor to Li Yuru.
