= Yu Kuizhi =

Peking opera performer

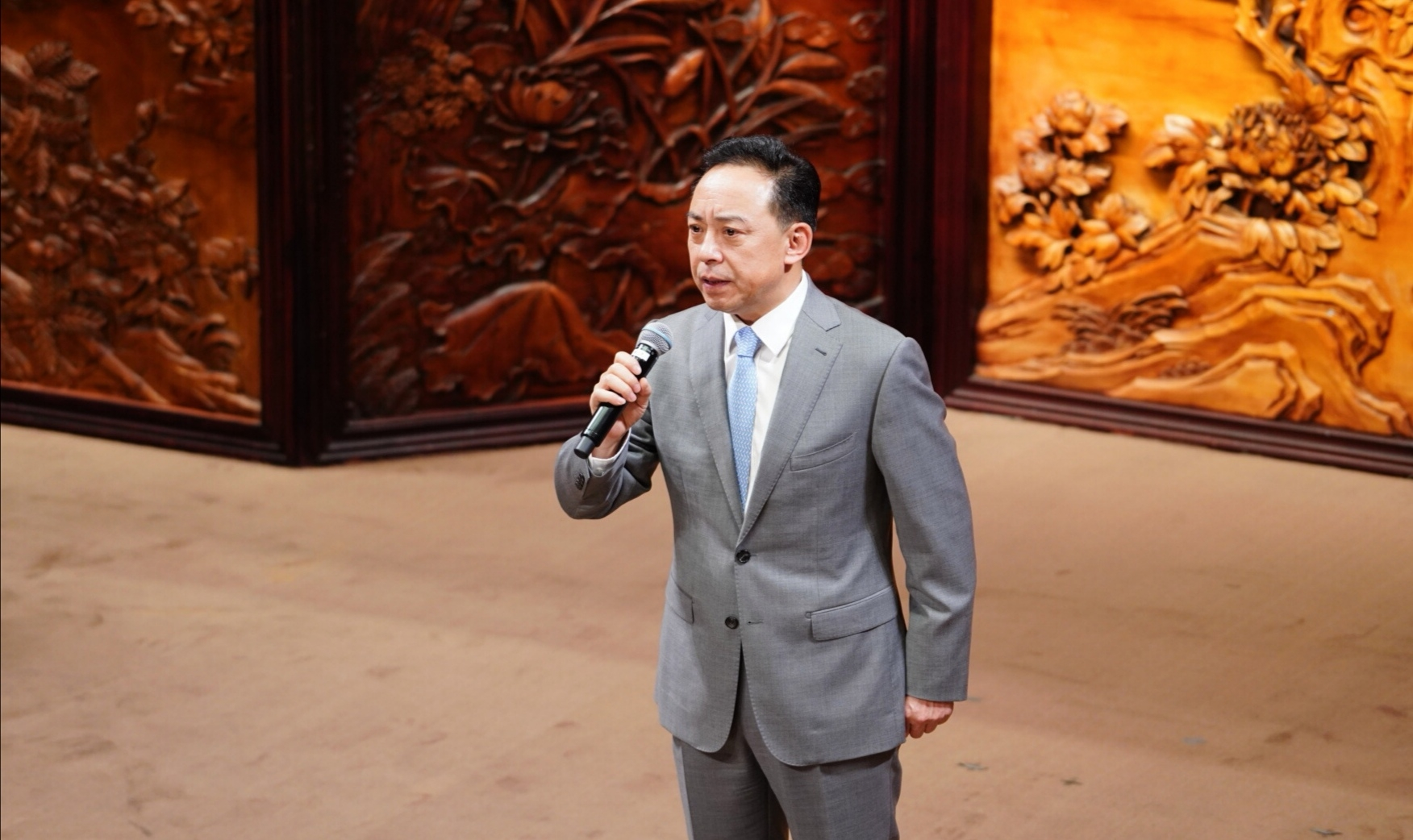
- Born: December 15, 1961 (age 64); Shenyang, Liaoning, China
- Education: National Academy of Chinese Theatre Arts
- Occupation: Peking opera performer
- Years active: 1982–present
- Employer: China National Peking Opera Company
- Known for: Old sheng roles
- Spouse: Leung Yee Mai (m. 1992)
- Children: 1

Chinese name
- Chinese: 于魁智
Transcriptions
Standard Mandarin
- Hanyu Pinyin: Yú Kuízhì

Yu Kuizhi (born 15 December 1961) is a Peking opera performer of Hui Chinese ethnicity. He plays the role of elderly men (laosheng) in Peking Opera.

== Biography ==
Yu Kuizhi was born in Shenyang City, Liaoning Province, into a working-class family, his mother being a music instructor and his father being a level eight fitter. He was inspired by his mother since he was little, and was the lead singer in his primary school choir. In April 1972, only 10 years of age, he was selected to learn Peking Opera by the Shenyang Chinese Opera Institute, and was carefully taught by many of the masters of Peking Opera. He laid a solid foundation in all aspects of Peking Opera, and at the age of 13 he had been given a main role as a child in the modern Peking opera, "Da Lu Ge", which he performed hundreds of times and received positive responses from.

In order to further his studies in the art of Peking Opera, he gave up his wages from the Shenyang Chinese Opera Institute and went to Beijing to audition for the National Academy of Chinese Theatre Arts, the top institution for studying Peking Opera. He graduated in 1982 with excellency in all his subjects, and was chosen to be part of the China National Peking Opera Company's No. 1 Troupe.

During his career, he has cooperated with many other senior Peking Opera artists, and has performed across Asia, Europe and America. In 1992, he married Leung Yee Mai from Hong Kong. They had their son Yu Wing Leung (Ferdi) in 1998.

== Work experience ==
- In 1992, he was promoted to a national level 1 performer
- In 2001, he served as the leader of the China National Peking Opera Company No 2. Troupe
- In 2005, the China National Peking Opera Company reestablished a new No. 1 Troupe, and appointed him as leader
- In March 2010, he assumed the office of China National Peking Opera Company's art director and vice president

== Representative works ==
=== Traditional operas ===
- Da Jin Zhuan (Shang Tian Tai)
- Qi Yuan Bao (Wu Pen Ji)
- Wu Zi Xu
- Shi Jie Ting • Kong Cheng Ji • Zhan Ma Su
- Yang Jia Jiang
- Ji Gu Ma Cao
- Si Lang Tan Mu
- Hong Zong Lie Ma
- Long Feng Cheng Xiang
- Ye Zhu Lin
- Xiang Ma Chuan
- Jiang Xiang He
- Man Jiang Hong
- Da Bao Guo • Tan Huang Ling • Er Jin Gong
- Qing Guan Ce
- Qun Ying Hui • Jie Dong Feng • Hua Rong Dao
- Da Yu Sha Jia

=== Modern operas ===
- Dan Jian Ji
- Bing Sheng Sun Wu
- Da Tang Gui Fei
- Mei Lan Fang
- Zhi Yin
- Yuan Chong Huan
- Zou Xi Kou
- Feng Yu Xing Huang Qi
- Chi Bi
