= Ye Shengzhang =

- Traditional Chinese: 葉盛章
- Simplified Chinese: 叶盛章
Transcriptions
Standard Mandarin
- Hanyu Pinyin: Yè Shèngzhāng
- Wade–Giles: Yeh Sheng-chang

Ye Shengzhang (7 December 1912 – 31 August 1966) was a Peking opera singer known for his "martial clown" roles (武丑, wǔchǒu). He served as a mentor to Li Yuru.
