= Mei Lanfang =

20th-century Peking opera artist (1894–1961)

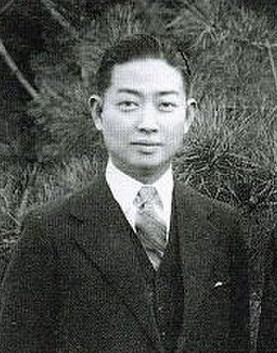
- Mei c. 1940
- Born: Mei Lan; October 22, 1894; Beijing, Qing Dynasty
- Died: August 8, 1961 (aged 66)
- Occupation: Peking opera artist
- Spouse(s): Wang Minghua (m. 1910) Fu Zhifang (m. 1921)
- Partner: Meng Xiaodong (1925–1930)
- Children: 11, including Baojiu

Chinese name
- Traditional Chinese: 梅瀾 梅蘭芳
- Simplified Chinese: 梅澜 梅兰芳
Transcriptions
Standard Mandarin
- Hanyu Pinyin: Méi Lán; Méi Lánfāng

Mei Lan (22 October 1894 – 8 August 1961), better known by his stage name Mei Lanfang, was a notable Chinese Peking opera artist in modern Chinese theater. Mei was known as the "Queen of Peking Opera". Mei was exclusively known for his female lead roles (dan) and particularly his "verdant-robed girls" (qingyi), young or middle-aged women of grace and refinement. He was considered one of the "Four Great Dan", along with Shang Xiaoyun, Cheng Yanqiu, and Xun Huisheng.

== Early life ==
Mei Lanfang was born in Beijing in 1894 into a family of Peking opera and Kunqu performers (performers of a traditional Chinese theatre composed of drama, ballet, opera, poetry, and music) of Taizhou, Jiangsu ancestry.

== Career ==
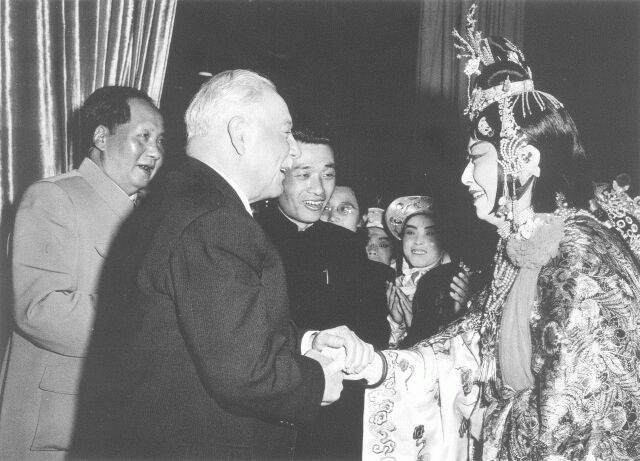
Mei Lanfang with Mao Zedong and Kliment Voroshilov in Beijing, 1957

At age 8, Mei Lanfang started training in Chinese opera skills such as acting, singing and acrobatics. Mei Lanfang made his stage debut at the Guanghe Theatre in 1904 when he was 11 years old playing a weaving girl. In his 50-year stage career, he maintained strong continuity while always working on new techniques. His most famous roles were those of female characters; the skillful portrayal of women won him international acclaim, and his smooth, perfectly timed, poised style has come to be known in opera circles as the "Mei School." He also played an important part in continuing the performance tradition of Kunqu, noted particularly for his interpretations of Du Liniang (杜丽娘; in The Peony Pavilion) and Bái Sùzhēn (白素贞; in Legend of the White Snake). Mei's famous portrayal of Beauty Yu was so historically moving that Wenting Song said he was one of the greatest vocal artists in modern China.

Mei was the first artist to spread Beijing Opera to foreign countries, participating in cultural exchanges with Japan, the United States, and other regions. He toured the world, forming friendships with the western contemporaries of his day, including Charlie Chaplin. In 1930 he toured North America, visiting Hollywood, where he was welcomed by Douglas Fairbanks and Mary Pickford. In 1935, Mei toured Europe, playing to appreciative audiences in Berlin and Moscow. Seeing Mei perform especially impressed the German playwright Bertolt Brecht and influenced his concept of the alienation effect. He served as one of the mentors and guardians of the actress Li Yuru as she began her career.

In July 1937, the Marco Polo Bridge Incident occurred, and the Imperial Japanese Army soon occupied Beijing. The commander of the Japanese Army ordered Mei to perform for them and appointed Mei to a high rank official position. But Mei refused to sing throughout the war and endured an impoverished lifestyle until the war ended in 1945.

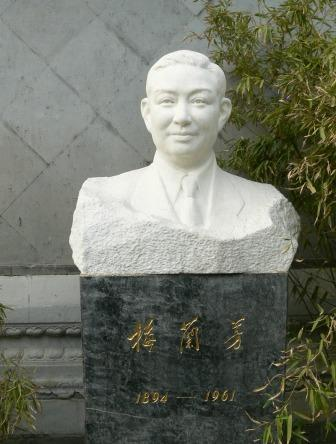
Bust of Méi Lánfāng in Mei Lanfang Memorial Museum in Beijing

After 1949 he served as director of China Beijing Opera Theater, director of the Chinese Opera Research Institute, and vice-chairman of China Federation of Literary and Art Circles. Mei joined the Chinese Communist Party in 1959. Besides his autobiography, Forty Years of Life on the Stage, several of his articles and essays have been published in The Collected Works of Mei Lanfang. Recordings of his best-known performances have been published in A Selection of Beijing Operas Performed by Mei Lanfang. In 2000, the story of his life was filmed in a documentary entitled The Worlds of Mei Lanfang. Acclaimed director Chen Kaige directed Forever Enthralled, a film biography of Mei's life, released in December 2008.

== Major Works of the Mei School ==
- The Legend of Lady Yang (楊太真外傳)
- The Drunken Royal Concubine (貴妃醉酒)
- Farewell My Concubine (霸王別姬)
- Heavenly Maiden Scattering Flowers (天女散花)
- The Cosmic Edge (宇宙鋒)
- The Hatred of Life and Death (生死恨)
- Lian Jinfeng (廉錦楓)
- Mu Guiying Takes Command (穆桂英掛帥)

These works form the core repertoire of the Mei school, representing the artistic style established by the renowned Peking‑opera master Mei Lanfang.

== Philanthropy ==
In 1924, Mei went to Japan after learning about the Great Kantō earthquake that had caused destruction. During his stay, he not only performed to earn money, but he also raised funds from the Japanese to help the cause.

== Personal life ==
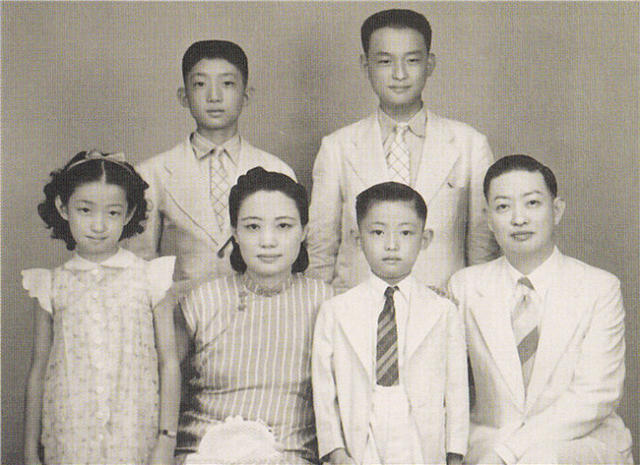
Mei Lanfang Family portrait in 1940s.

In the year 1910, Mei married Wang Minghua who was from a family of opera players. They had one son and one daughter together before Wang underwent sterilization surgery; unfortunately, both children died before reaching adulthood. In order to carry on the family lineage and with Wang's consent, Mei married his second wife Fu Zhifang in 1921, an opera actress. Together they had nine children but only four survived to adulthood. In 1925, Mei began seeing opera star Meng Xiaodong. They lived together unmarried for five years before they broke up. Mei's daughter Mei Baoyue and youngest son Mei Baojiu (1934–2016) inherited and carried on Mei's art as opera players.

== In popular culture ==
Chen Kaige's 2008 film Forever Enthralled is a biographical account of Mei Lanfang.

In 2009, the Chinese Google homepage displayed a logo commemorating his 115th birthday on October 22.

== See also ==
- The Qing Ding Pearl

== Bibliography ==
- Li Ruru (2010), "2010 Commemorations of the Theatrical Careers of Cao Yu and Li Yuru" (PDF), CHINOPERL Papers, Conference on Chinese Oral and Performing Literature.
