= The Hegemon-King Bids His Lady Farewell =

Chinese opera

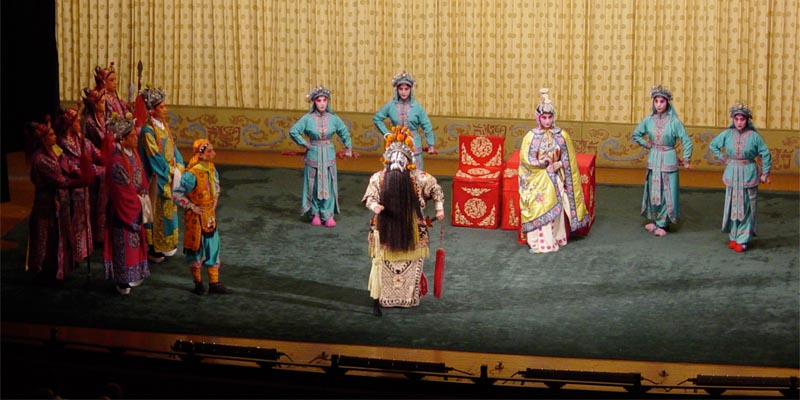
A Peking opera performance of The Hegemon-King Bids His Lady Farewell.

The Hegemon-King Bids His Lady Farewell (Chinese: 霸王别姬; pinyin: Bà Wáng Bié Jī), also known as Farewell My Concubine, is a traditional Peking opera. It was initially performed by Yang Xiaolou and Shang Xiaoyun in 1918 in Beijing. Though usually associated with Peking opera, it is also performed in other genres such as Cantonese opera.

The story prototype of Farewell My Concubine (霸王別姬) draws primarily from several traditional sources: Sima Qian’s Records of the Grand Historian (史記, Shiji), specifically the Annals of Xiang Yu (史記·項羽本紀); Zhen Wei’s Ming‑dynasty historical novel Romance of the Western Han (西漢演義); and Shen Cai’s Ming‑dynasty Kunqu chuanqi play The Tale of a Thousand Gold (千金記).

The opera tells the story of Xiang Yu, the self-styled "Hegemon-King of Western Chu" (西楚霸王) who battled for the unification of China with Liu Bang, the eventual founder of the Han dynasty. In the play, Xiang Yu is surrounded by Liu Bang's forces and on the verge of total defeat, so he calls forth his horse and begs it to run away for the sake of its own safety. The horse refuses, against his wishes. He then calls for the company of his wife Consort Yu. Realizing the dire situation that has befallen them, she begs to die alongside her master, but he strongly refuses this wish. Afterwards, as he is distracted, Yu commits suicide with Xiang Yu's sword.

The novel Farewell My Concubine by Lilian Lee and its film adaptation of the same name use the play as part of their stories.

== Plot ==
Farewell My Concubine is a single‑act, single‑scene traditional Peking‑opera — a self‑contained excerpt focusing only on the farewell between Xiang Yu (項羽) and Yu Ji (虞姬, lit. Consort Yu):

During the Chu–Han contention (楚漢相爭) at the end of the Qin dynasty, Han Xin (韓信) first joins Xiang Yu but receives no significant appointment. Later, through Xiao He’s recommendation, he becomes Liu Bang’s general. At this time, Liu Bang and Xiang Yu agree to a truce, setting the Honggou Canal as the boundary between their forces.

Han Xin sends Li Zuoche (李左車) to feign surrender to Xiang Yu, luring him into launching an attack on Pei County. Xiang Yu ignores repeated warnings from his generals and insists on mobilizing his troops. In Pengcheng, Xiang Yu receives Li Zuoche, who pretends loyalty and presents a map of Han troop deployments. Although the Chu generals urge caution, Xiang Yu remains determined to fight. Seeing that Xiang Yu refuses all advice, Yu Ziqi (虞子期) turns to his sister, Consort Yu, hoping she can dissuade the king. Yet Xiang Yu persists in his decision, leaving Consort Yu no choice but to accompany him into battle.

When the Chu forces reached Jiuli Mountain, they fell into Han Xin’s “Ambush from Ten Sides” and were eventually encircled at Gaixia, facing utter isolation and dwindling supplies. That night, the Han army launched a psychological assault: soldiers were ordered to sing folk songs in the Chu dialect around the encampment. Hearing Chu melodies from all directions, the homesick Chu soldiers lost morale and deserted through the night. Xiang Yu was shocked, mistakenly believing that Liu Bang had already taken all of Chu and that his cause was lost.

Returning to his command tent, Xiang Yu confronted the hopeless situation. Stroking his beloved warhorse, Wuzhui, he sang the famous Song of Gaixia: "Though my strength could lift mountains, my spirit now fades. My horse will not advance—what can be done? Yu, my Yu, what shall become of you?" (力拔山兮氣蓋世，時不利兮騅不逝。騅不逝兮可奈何，虞兮虞兮奈若何！)

Consort Yu, suppressing her grief, comforted him with gentle words. She poured wine to ease his sorrow and performed a sword dance within the tent—this is the celebrated Mei‑school sequence known as “See how the King sleeps peacefully in his tent.” To free Xiang Yu from all burdens as he attempted to break through the encirclement, Yu ended her dance by drawing her sword and taking her own life.

== See also ==
Farewell My Concubine (1993): a film directed by Chen Kaige, starring Leslie Cheung (張國榮), Gong Li (巩俐), and Zhang Fengyi (張豐毅).
