= Du Junhui =

Chinese activist (1904–1981)

- 杜君慧
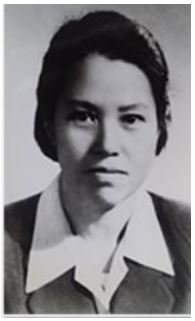
- Born: September 15, 1904; Guangzhou, Guangdong, China
- Died: February 7, 1981; Beijing, China
- Other name: Lu Lan
- Organizations: League of Left-Wing Writers
- Awards: Order of Merit for National Foundation (South Korea, 2016)

Du Junhui (15 September 1904 – 7 February 1981), also known by her pen name Lu Lan, was a Chinese women's rights activist and an early theorist of the Feminism in China. She served as an alternate executive member of the First All-China Women's Federation, a delegate to the 8th National Congress of the Chinese Communist Party, and a member of the 1st, 2nd, and 3rd National Committees of the Chinese People's Political Consultative Conference. She was also a standing committee member of the 4th Guangdong Provincial CPPCC. Du was the wife of Korean independence activist Kim Seong-suk and was posthumously awarded the Order of Merit for National Foundation by the South Korean government in 2016.

== Life ==
Du Junhui was born in Guangzhou on September 15, 1904. In 1926, she graduated from Sun Yat-sen University, becoming one of the first female university graduates in Guangdong Province. That same year, she joined the Guangdong Women's Emancipation Association and became an active member of the organization. In 1926, Du planned to study abroad in Japan. While attending Japanese language classes at Sun Yat-sen University, she met Kim Seong-suk, a Korean independence activist, a member of the Chinese Communist Party, and her Japanese instructor. Kim introduced her to many aspects of Marxist-Leninist ideology. Later, in 1926, Du departed for Japan to further her studies. At the time, Japan had more readily available Marxist-Leninist publications than China. While in Japan, she began reading original Marxist texts, publications of the Communist International, and progressive literature from various countries. Due to financial difficulties, she returned to Guangzhou in 1927. In December 1927, Du participated in the Guangzhou Uprising. After the uprising was suppressed, she helped Kim Seong-suk evacuate Korean soldiers who had fought. In January 1928, Du returned to Japan, where she joined the Anti-Japanese Alliance of Chinese Students in Japan. In June of the same year, she returned to China to do revolutionary work in Shanghai and officially joined the Chinese Communist Party.

=== Activities in the Left-Wing Writers' League ===
After returning to Shanghai, Du Junhui reunited with Kim Seong-suk, who had also relocated to the city. On November 4, 1929, the two were married. In 1930, they both joined the League of Left-Wing Writers. They co-translated works such as the Dictionary of Social Sciences and History of Education. Du also independently translated and published The State and Revolution and Pathology of Education and began applying Marxist-Leninist theory to studying feminism. In February 1934, she assisted Shen Zijiu in editing the supplements of Shen Bao and its women's column Women's Garden, where she serialized her treatise Lectures on Women's Issues. The following year, she again worked with Shen to launch the monthly magazine Women's Life.

=== Anti-Japanese War Period ===
Following the December 9th Movement in 1935, Du Junhui became Party Secretary and Head of Organization for the Shanghai Women's National Salvation Association. She called on women to resist the Japanese occupation of Northeast China. In May 1936, she was appointed a National Salvation Association of All Circles board member, engaging in movements opposing Japanese aggression in North China. She published Chinese Women's Issues and a revised edition of Talks on Women's Issues during this time. In the second half of 1936, Du Junhui and Kim Seong-suk were suspected by the organization due to the Kim San incident, and their Communist Party membership was terminated. After the full-scale Second Sino-Japanese War outbreak, Du followed her husband to cities such as Wuhan and Chongqing. She held positions such as board member of the Wartime Childcare Association of China and director of the Chongqing Temporary Nursery. In Luzhou, Sichuan, she founded and directed the Seventh Nursery. In 1944, she became a committee member of the Women's Division of the Sino-Soviet Cultural Association, promoting Sino-Soviet friendship. With the support of Deng Yingchao, she launched the monthly magazine Working Women in November 1944, aiming to criticize the Nationalist government's call for women to "return home" after mass layoffs. 1945, she was elected Executive Director of the Chinese Women's Friendship Association. The following year, she rejoined the Chinese Communist Party.

=== Later life ===
After the liberation of Beiping in January 1949, Du was appointed Headteacher of the city's No. 3 Girls' Middle School. In March, at the First National Women's Congress of China, she was elected an alternate member of the First Executive Committee of the All-China Women's Federation. She attended the First Plenary Session of the National Committee of the Chinese People's Political Consultative Conference in September. In 1950, the Organization Department of the Chinese Communist Party restored her original Party membership, retroactively recognizing her status before her second admission in 1946. In 1955, she became the principal and Party branch secretary of Beijing No. 6 Middle School. She was elected as a delegate to the Eighth National Congress of the Chinese Communist Party (1956), a member of the 2nd (1954) and 3rd (1959) National Committee of the Chinese People's Political Consultative Conference, and a standing committee member of the 4th Guangdong Provincial Committee of the CPPCC. Du Junhui passed away in Beijing on February 7, 1981.

== Honors ==
As Kim Seong-suk's wife, Du Junhui supported the Korean independence movement and was active in campaigns for the liberation of Korean women. She once referred to herself as "a daughter of Korea" and stated that she had always treated Korean women's issues as her own. During wartime in Chongqing, she served as an executive committee member of the Korean Women's Patriotic Association and was also a director of the Korean Relief Association. In recognition of her contributions to Korea's independence, the South Korean government posthumously awarded her the Order of Merit for National Foundation on August 15, 2016, the 71st anniversary of Korea's liberation.

== Family ==
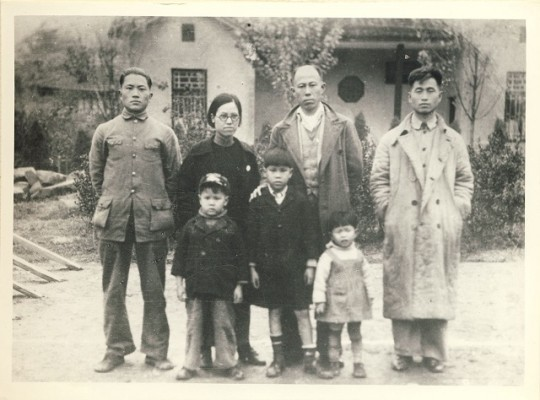
From the back row, second from right: Kim Seong-suk; second from left: Du Junhui; far right: Park Geon-ung (brother-in-law of composer Zheng Lücheng). Front row, from right: Park Yi-ran (daughter of Zheng Feng'en and Park Geon-ung), Du Jian, and Du Lian (sons of Kim Seong-suk and Du Junhui).

Du Junhui was married to Kim Seong-suk, a Korean independence activist and member of the Chinese Communist Party. The couple married in Shanghai on November 4, 1929, and had three sons. Following Japan's surrender in 1945, Kim returned to Korea alongside senior members of the Provisional Government of the Republic of Korea, while Du chose to remain in China. 1946, they formally divorced after mutual consideration, though they maintained correspondence for many years. Their three sons later adopted Du's surname. During the period of China's reform and opening-up, Kim's son from his Korean wife visited Beijing and reunited with Du Junhui's children. In the 1990s, Du's three sons also visited Korea to reconnect with their father's homeland. Du's eldest son, Du Qian, was a conductor with the Guangdong Symphony Orchestra. Her second son, Du Jian, became a council member of the China Artists Association and vice president of the Central Academy of Fine Arts. Her third son, Du Lian, served as a consultant at the Information Center of the National Development and Reform Commission. Her grandson, Du Ningwu, is a pianist who has visited South Korea multiple times for performances. Du and Kim were also close to composer Zheng Lücheng and his brother-in-law Park Geon-ung. Zheng, who came to China in the 1930s, was welcomed and supported by the couple, who treated him like family. Zheng later joined the Korean National Liberation League led by Kim. In 1937, with assistance from Du Junhui—especially her efforts—Zheng received introduction letters from Pan Hannian and Xuan Xiafu, as well as travel funds from Li Gongpu, which enabled him to reach the revolutionary base in Yan'an.
