= Wu Zuguang =

Chinese playwright

- 吴祖光
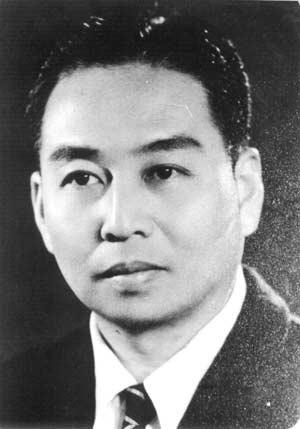
- Born: 21 April 1917; Beijing, China
- Died: 9 April 2003 (aged 85); Beijing, China
- Education: Sino-French University
- Occupations: Playwright, film director and social critic
- Spouse(s): Lü En (m. 1946; div. 1950) Xin Fengxia (m. 1951; died 1998)
- Children: 3
- Writing career
- Language: Chinese
- Period: 1937–2003
- Notable works: City of Phoenix, Return on a Snowy Night, The Soul of the Nation, Itinerant Players
- Movement: New Culture Movement

Wu Zuguang (Chinese: 吴祖光; pinyin: Wú Zǔguāng; Wade–Giles: Wu Tsu-kuang; 21 April 1917 – 9 April 2003) was a Chinese playwright, film director and social critic who has been called a "legendary figure in Chinese art and literary circles". He authored more than 40 plays and film scripts, including the patriotic drama City of Phoenix, one of the most influential plays during the Second Sino-Japanese War, and Return on a Snowy Night, which is generally considered his masterpiece. He directed The Soul of the Nation, Hong Kong's first colour film, based on his own historical drama Song of Righteousness.

He was also well known as an outspoken critic of China's cultural policies, both of the Kuomintang (KMT) and the Communist governments, and was repeatedly persecuted as a result. He fled to Hong Kong in 1945 to avoid being captured by KMT agents, and returned to Beijing after the foundation of the People's Republic of China in 1949. He was denounced as a "rightist" during the Anti-Rightist Campaign and performed hard labour in the "Great Northern Wilderness" for three years, and was again persecuted during the Cultural Revolution. His wife, the celebrated pingju actress Xin Fengxia, refused to divorce him and became disabled after undergoing beatings and penal labour. Despite these ordeals, Wu continued to criticize government censorship and to call for political freedom, and was widely admired for his moral conviction.

== Early life ==
Wu was born on 21 April 1917 to a prominent scholar-official family in Beijing, with ancestral roots in Changzhou, Jiangsu Province. His grandfather Wu Zhiying (吴稚英) was a muliao of the Qing dynasty reformer Zhang Zhidong and participated in the Xinhai Revolution. His father Wu Ying (吴瀛) was a founder and curator of the Beijing Palace Museum. His mother Zhou Qinqi (周琴绮) gave birth to 15 children, 11 of whom (four sons and seven daughters) survived to adulthood. She gave birth to Wu Zuguang, her first child, in the mansion of Wu Ying's uncle Zhuang Yunkuan, a minister of the Republic of China government.

In 1935, Wu entered Sino-French University in Beijing. The next year, a relative who was running a drama school in Nanjing persuaded him to move there and teach at his school. There he met several people who would become prominent dramatists, including Cao Yu and Chen Zhice.

== Wartime career ==
At the outset of the Second Sino-Japanese War in 1937, Wu wrote the patriotic war play City of Phoenix (凤凰城), which made him well known in China at age 20. It was one of the most performed dramas during the eight-year war. He later wrote several critically acclaimed plays, including Return on a Snowy Night, which is generally considered his masterpiece. His works are strongly influenced by the May Fourth New Culture Movement.

As eastern China fell to the Japanese, he moved to the wartime capital Chongqing, where he worked as an editor for the Xinmin Wanbao newspaper. In 1945, he published Mao Zedong's now famous poem "Snow: to the Tune of Garden in Full Spring", which infuriated the Kuomintang government. He escaped to British Hong Kong to avoid being captured by KMT agents, and made a living writing screenplays and making films. He directed The Soul of the Nation (国魂), Hong Kong's first colour film, based on his historical drama, Song of Righteousness, about the Song dynasty patriot Wen Tianxiang. He also made Return on a Snowy Night into a film, as well as two others. In 1946, Wu married the actress Lü En (吕恩) in Shanghai.

== Early People's Republic ==
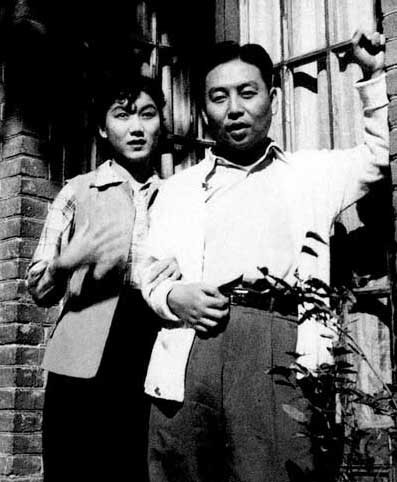
Wu Zuguang and wife Xin Fengxia

After the Chinese Communist Party (CCP) won the Civil War and established the People's Republic of China in 1949, Wu returned to Beijing. Like many intellectuals at the time, he held high hopes for the new People's Republic which finally restored peace in a united China after decades of war and division. He wanted to return to writing plays, but was assigned by the government to direct Song of the Red Flag, a film about women textile workers. As he had no experience with factory life, it took him a year to finish the film, which he considered a "worthless failure." He and Lü En divorced amicably in 1950, due to differences in personality and interests.

In 1951, his friend Lao She introduced him to the famous pingju opera performer Xin Fengxia, who had acted in one of Wu's plays and admired his talent. They married that year, despite the fact that they were from differing socioeconomic backgrounds; she had no formal education and was nearly illiterate, while he was from a prominent family of scholars. Wu helped her to study reading, writing, and calligraphy.

During this period he made the Peking opera film Goddess of the Luo River (洛神) and Mei Lanfang and His Stage Art, a documentary about Mei Lanfang. He also wrote the Peking operas Three Beatings of Tao Sanchun (三打陶三春) and San Guan Yan (三关宴).

== Persecution ==
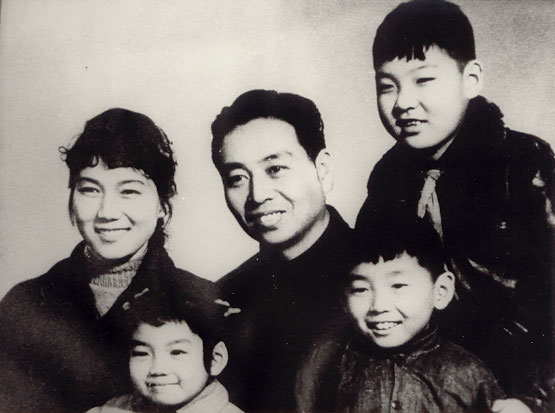
Wu (center), his wife Xin Fengxia, and their three children

During Mao Zedong's Anti-Rightist Campaign, Wu was denounced as a "rightist" in 1957 and sent to the Great Northern Wilderness in Heilongjiang to be "reformed through labour." His crime was to criticize the CCP's control of the theatre and to argue that the neihang (experts) should have a greater role in such matters. He was called an enemy of the CCP, even by his renowned colleague Tian Han. Tian later referenced Wu's work approvingly, which is seen by some as an implicit apology, and was himself persecuted to death. Xin Fengxia was pressured to divorce him, but refused. Citing a legendary love story from one of her operas, she said "Wang Baochuan waited 18 years for Xue Pinggui, and I will wait 28 years for Wu Zuguang." As a result, she was herself labeled a rightist and went through struggle sessions.

Wu returned to Beijing after three years of hard labour, but six years later, China fell into the even greater turmoil of the Cultural Revolution, which began in 1966. Xin Fengxia and Wu Zuguang were both denounced at the beginning of the period. She became disabled below her left knee after a severe beating. Their friend Lao She drowned himself after being similarly tortured. During the tumultuous decade Wu and Xin both served years of forced labour. In December 1975, she became paralyzed after suffering a stroke, and Wu took care of her for the rest of her life.

== Post-Cultural Revolution ==
After the end of the Cultural Revolution, Wu was politically rehabilitated in 1980 and inducted into the CCP, an event he described as "neither an occasion for laughter or tears", and his publication ban was lifted after two decades. His play Itinerant Players (闯江湖), based on Xin Fengxia's experiences, was performed that year. In 1983, Wu traveled to the University of Iowa in the U.S. to attend the International Writing Program.

Wu was in general loyal to Deng Xiaoping's government, but continued to be an outspoken critic. In 1983, he dismissed Deng's Anti-Spiritual Pollution Campaign as futile. In September 1986, he read an essay at a meeting of the China Writers Association entitled "Against Those Who Wield the Scissors—a Plea for an End to Censorship". It was enthusiastically received by the audience, but only a censored version was published, minus 1,000 characters deemed "acrimonious". After the December 1986 student demonstrations, he was pressured to leave the CCP in 1987. Retired Politburo member Hu Qiaomu came to his home in person to demand his resignation from the CCP. He obliged, as he did not think he was "the sort of person who should be in the Party." In spring 1989, Wu signed a petition calling for greater political freedom. Following the 1989 Tiananmen Square protests and massacre, Wu called for a reassessment of the incident, but was forbidden to speak at a Chinese People's Political Consultative Conference meeting.

Xin Fengxia died on 12 April 1998, during a trip to Changzhou, Wu's ancestral hometown. He was devastated by the loss and his health quickly deteriorated. He suffered three strokes in the next few years, and died on 9 April 2003.

== Children ==
Wu Zuguang and Xin Fengxia had three children. Their son Wu Huan is also a writer, painter, and calligrapher. After the deaths of Wu Zuguang, he organized the exhibition "A Hundred Years of the Wu Family" at the Poly Art Museum in Beijing. It was also held in France, Hong Kong, and Taiwan.
