= Xin Fengxia =

Chinese pingju opera performer

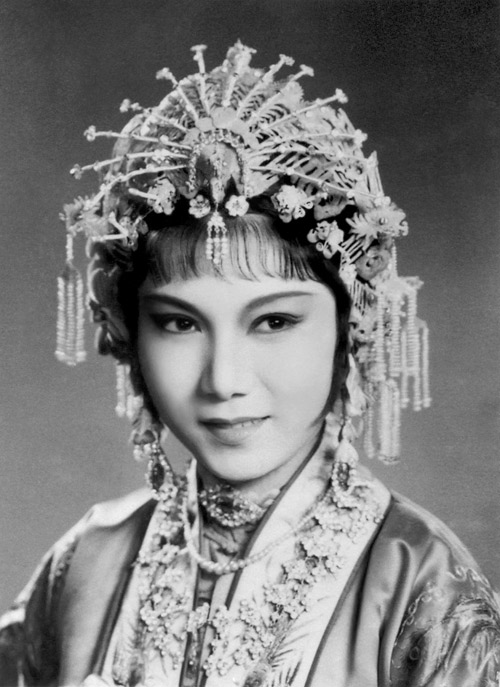
- Xin Fengxia in Flowers as Matchmakers
- Born: 1927; Suzhou, Jiangsu, China
- Died: 12 April 1998 (aged 70–71); Changzhou, Jiangsu, China
- Occupations: Pingju opera singer, writer, painter
- Spouse: Wu Zuguang
- Children: 3

Xin Fengxia (Chinese: 新凤霞; pinyin: Xīn Fèngxiá; Wade–Giles: Hsin Feng-hsia; 1927 – 12 April 1998) was a Chinese pingju opera performer, known as the "Queen of Pingju". She was also a film actress, writer, and painter. She starred in the highly popular films Liu Qiao'er (1956) and Flowers as Matchmakers (1964), both adapted from her operas.

Xin was married to Wu Zuguang, a prominent playwright and an outspoken critic of government policies. When Wu was denounced as a "rightist" in Mao Zedong's Anti-Rightist Campaign, Xin refused to divorce him and was herself denounced as a result. She was later severely persecuted during the Cultural Revolution, becoming disabled after a beating and was later paralyzed due to a stroke. No longer able to perform, she dedicated the remainder of her life to teaching, writing, and painting. She studied painting with her godfather Qi Baishi, a master of Chinese painting, and studied writing with her husband. She published a two-million-word memoir, which has been translated into English and Urdu.

Xin Fengxia pioneered her own style of pingju, now called the "Xin" (which also means "new") style. It has become one of the most important styles of the opera. In 2014, the China Pingju Institute created the new pingju opera Xin Fengxia to commemorate her life.

== Early life and career ==
Xin Fengxia was born in Suzhou, Jiangsu, China. When she was a toddler she was sold by human smugglers to Tianjin in northern China, and was given the name Yang Shumin (杨淑敏). She was trained as an opera performer from a young age. At that time, the theatrical world in China was controlled by gangsters. Actors, even renowned performers, had little personal freedom. She originally trained for Peking opera under her "older sister" Yang Jinxiang, but later changed to pingju. She toured extensively, and by the 1940s, her fame had rivalled well known female stars such as Liu Cuixia, Bai Yushuang, and Fu Ronghua.

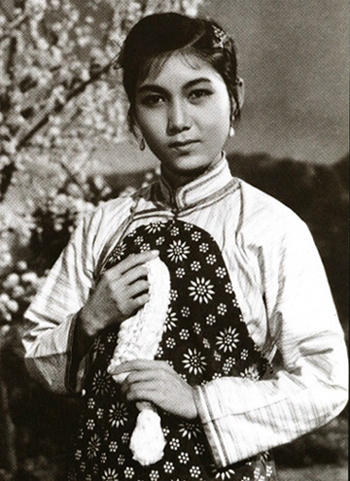
Xin Fengxia in Liu Qiao'er

After the establishment of the People's Republic of China in 1949, Xin moved to Beijing. Her first performance, in the modern pingju Little Erhei's Marriage, was well liked and attracted the attention of the original novelist Zhao Shuli and the well known writer Lao She. Her next performance, in Liu Qiao'er, was even more successful, making her a household name in China. In the opera Flowers as Matchmakers (Hua Wei Mei), she transformed the traditional melancholy tunes of pingju into joyous ones, and enriched the pingju repertoire by creating many new melodies. It is now considered a classic of the Xin style pingju. Liu Qiao'er was made into a film in 1956, which was followed by Flowers as Matchmakers in 1964. Both starred Xin and were extremely popular. Premier Zhou Enlai and his wife Deng Yingchao were both her fans. Zhou once said: "I can live without tea for three days, but not without watching Xin Fengxia."

== Marriage and persecution ==
In 1951, Lao She introduced Xin Fengxia to the famous playwright Wu Zuguang. Like many intellectuals at the time, Wu held high hopes for the new People's Republic and returned to China from British Hong Kong. Xin, who had acted in one of Wu's plays, admired his talent. They married that year, despite the fact that they were from differing socioeconomic backgrounds; she had no formal education and was nearly illiterate, while he was from a prominent family of scholars. Wu helped her to study reading, writing, and calligraphy. She also studied painting with Qi Baishi, one of the most celebrated masters of Chinese painting, who took her as his goddaughter.

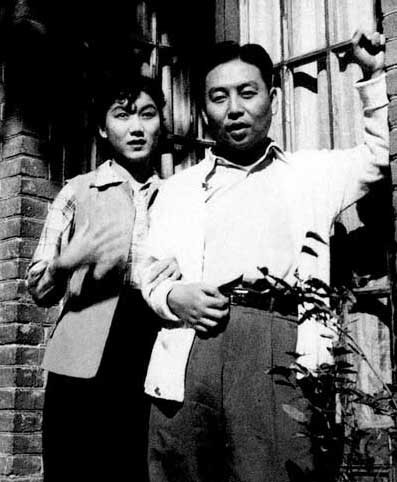
Xin Fengxia and Wu Zuguang

Wu Zuguang, an outspoken critic of government cultural policies, was denounced in 1957 as a "rightist" in Mao Zedong's Anti-Rightist Campaign, and was sent to the Great Northern Wilderness in Heilongjiang to be "reformed through labour." Xin was pressured to divorce her husband, but refused. Citing a legendary love story from one of her operas, she said "Wang Baochuan waited 18 years for Xue Pinggui, and I will wait 28 years for Wu Zuguang." As a result, she was herself labeled a rightist and went through struggle sessions.

Wu returned to Beijing after three years of hard labour, but six years later, China fell into the even greater turmoil of the Cultural Revolution, which began in 1966. Xin Fengxia and Wu Zuguang were both denounced at the beginning of the period. She was severely beaten by a junior actor of the China Pingju Institute; her left knee was broken and she never fully recovered from the injury. The couple's friend Lao She drowned himself after being similarly tortured. After her beating Xin served seven years of forced labour. In December 1975, she became paralyzed after suffering a stroke. Wu took care of her for the rest of her life.

== Post-Cultural Revolution ==
After the Cultural Revolution, Xin Fengxia was politically rehabilitated in 1979, but was unable to return to the stage because of her disability. Her performance in Flowers as Matchmakers in 1964 proved to be her last. She devoted her energy to writing, painting, and training the younger generation of pingju performers. In 1997, she published her two-million-word memoir, which has been translated into English and Urdu. Ye Shengtao, the renowned writer and publisher, greatly encouraged her to write. He composed two poems praising her courage and talent. Her paintings, which were decorated with her husband's calligraphy, were also popular, and an exhibition of them was held at the China Military Museum in 1994. She was elected as a member of the Chinese People's Political Consultative Conference.

In April 1998, while visiting Changzhou, her husband's hometown, she suffered a cerebral hemorrhage. She was sent to Changzhou No. 1 People's Hospital, where she died after a week, on 12 April 1998.

== Legacy ==
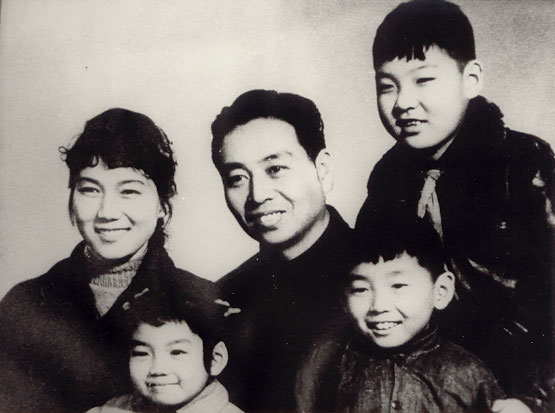
Family portrait

Xin Fengxia and Wu Zuguang had three children. Their son, Wu Huan, is also a writer, painter, and calligrapher. After the deaths of Xin in 1998 and of Wu Zuguang in 2003, he organized the exhibition "A Hundred Years of the Wu Family" at the Poly Art Museum in Beijing. It was also shown in France, Hong Kong, and Taiwan.

The "Xin" style of pingju pioneered by Xin Fengxia has become one of the most important styles of the opera. In 2014, the China Pingju Institute created a new opera entitled Xin Fengxia to commemorate her life, with focuses on her reformation of the opera, and the love story of Xin and Wu. It is written by Huang Weiruo (黄维若), and directed by Guo Xiaonan (郭小男).
