= Zheng Lücheng =

Korean-born Chinese composer (1914–1976)

- 郑律成
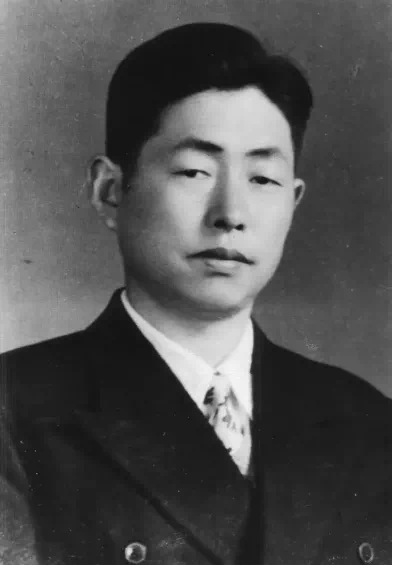
- Born: Chŏng Puŭn (정부은); 27 August 1914; Gwangju, Korea, Empire of Japan
- Died: 7 December 1976 (aged 62); Beijing, China
- Other names: Zheng Fuen (郑富恩); Chong Yul-song (정율성, see also Initial sound rule)
- Occupation: Composer
- Notable work: Military Anthem of the People's Liberation Army
- Spouse: Ding Xuesong (1941–1976)
- Children: 1

Zheng Lücheng (Chinese: 郑律成) or Chong Ryul-song (Korean: 정률성; 27 August 1914 – 7 December 1976) was a Korean-born Chinese composer. Born during the period of Japanese colonial rule in Korea, Zheng moved to China in the 1930s, where he became active in the anti-Japanese resistance and joined the ranks of progressive intellectual and cultural circles. Over the course of his career, he created numerous military marches, operas and choral works with Chinese revolutionary themes. His most notable work is the composing of the music to the Military Anthem of the People's Liberation Army.

== Early life ==
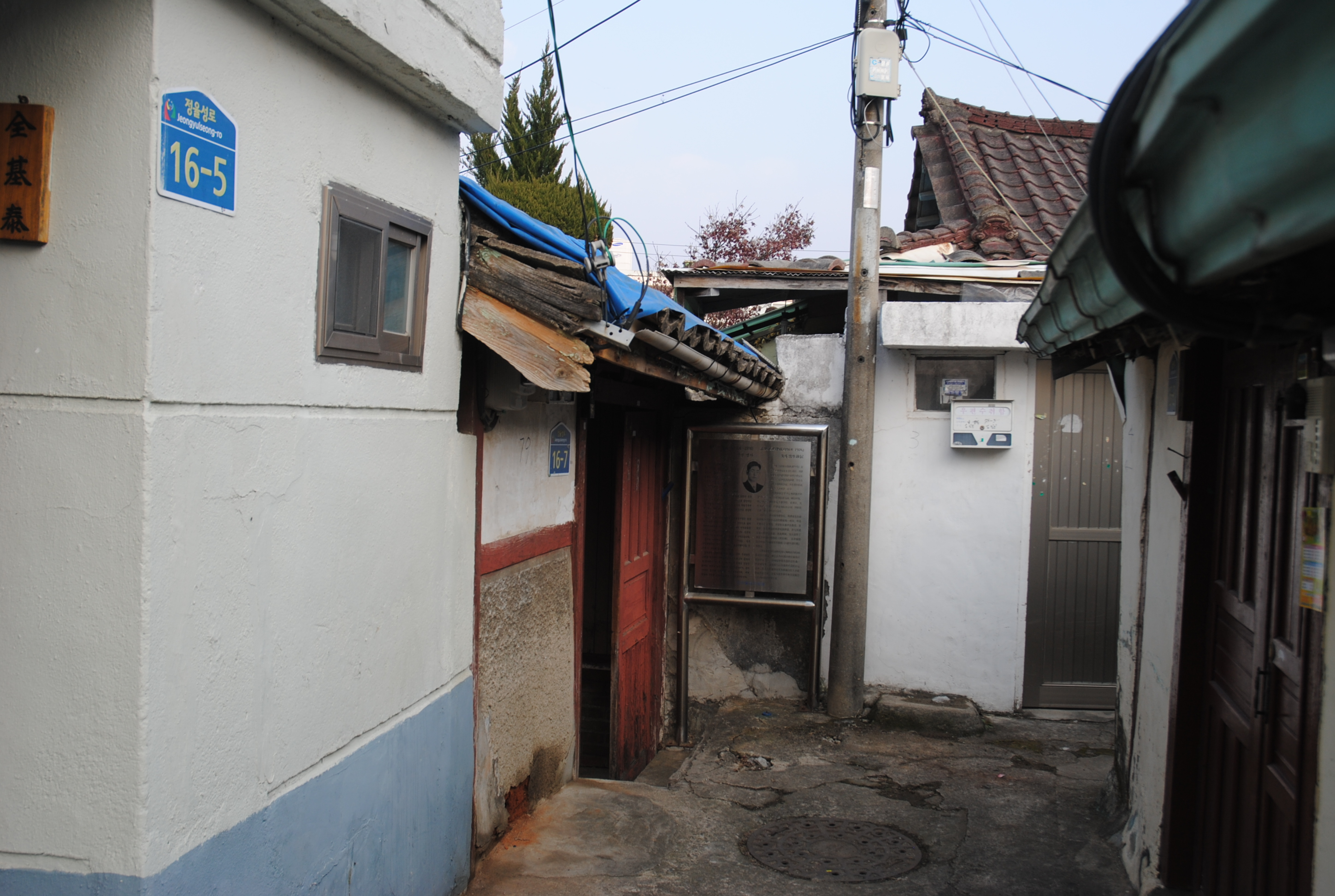
Zheng Lücheng's birthplace in Gwangju

Zheng was born Chŏng Puŭn (정부은; 鄭富恩) in the city of Gwangju in Zenranan Province, Korea, Empire of Japan (now South Korea) in 1914. He was the youngest in his family and loved music from an early age. His father, Chŏng Haeŏp (정해업), opposed the corruption of the Korean nobility and left the Hadong Jeong clan, later working for a respected official's family. Zheng's older brothers were deeply involved in the Korean independence movement.

Zheng's father was a patriot who refused to send him to Japanese-run schools, instead enrolling him in progressive private schools. After his father's death in 1931, his family decided to send Zheng to China. In 1933, with the help of relatives, he traveled from Mokpo to Busan and then via Nagasaki to Shanghai, China.

== Career ==
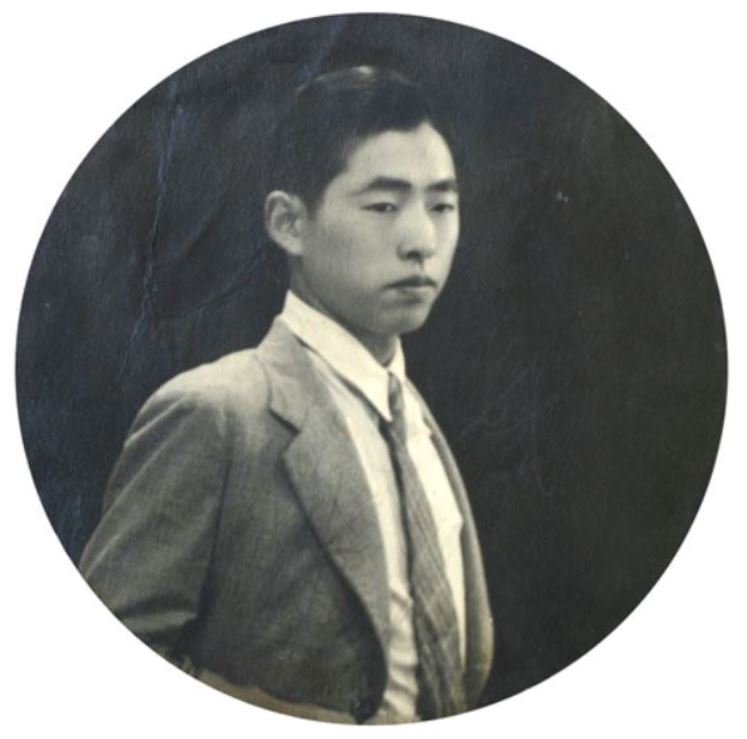
Zheng in 1930

In May 1933, Zheng arrived in Shanghai by ship and then went to Nanjing to study at the Korean Revolutionary Military and Political Cadre School. That September, he joined the Korean nationalist group Heroic Corps. In Nanjing, he also befriended Chinese pianist Fan Jisen. In 1934, under the support of Korean independence activist Kim Won-bong, Zheng worked at the Nanjing telephone bureau monitoring Japanese communications. Kim also funded his weekend trips to Shanghai to study music. With the help of Fan and composer Du Yijia, Zheng studied under a Russian mezzo-soprano, who admired his talent and even considered recommending him to Italy, saying he had the potential to be the 'Eastern Caruso'. While in Shanghai, Zheng reunited with his sister and her husband. He also met communist activists such as Kim San, Kim Kyu-kwang and Du Junhui.

In 1936, Zheng joined the Korean National Liberation Alliance. Through Kim San, he met Luo Qing, a member of the underground Chinese Communist Party (CCP) in Nanjing, and joined the progressive May Literature and Arts Society, for which he composed the anthem "Song of May". This brought him into contact with leftist Chinese artists such as Tian Han, with whom he actively carried out anti-Japanese propaganda. However, political differences soon emerged between members of the Heroic Corps due to some of them split in their affiliations between CCP and Kuomintang, the Heroic Corps stopped funding Zheng's music studies in Shanghai. He had to end his training with and also left the Korean National Revolutionary Party.

=== Time in Yan'an ===
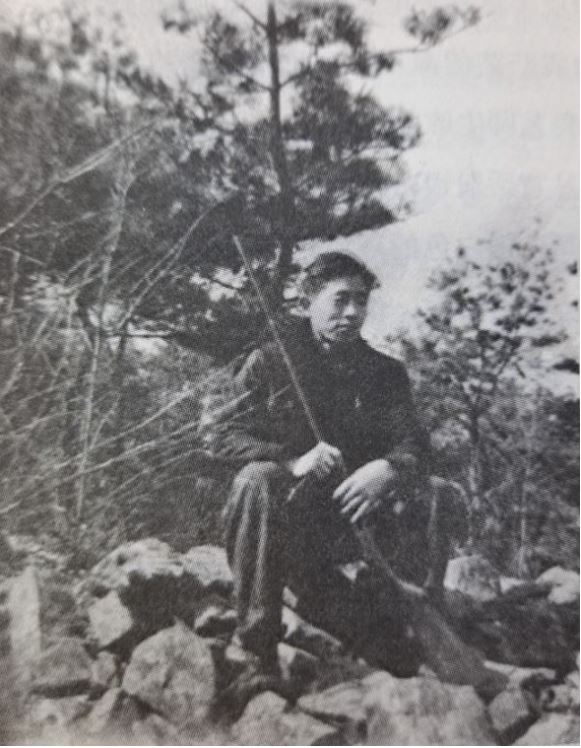
Zheng hunting in Yan'an (1941)

In 1937, with the help of Du Junhui, Zheng traveled to Yan'an, carrying introduction letters from Pan Hannian and Xuan Xiaofu. He also received 30 silver dollars for travel expenses from Li Gongpu, while members of the May Literature Society provided him with daily necessities. In October 1937, he arrived in Yan'an and entered the Northern Shaanxi Public School. In early 1938, he joined the newly established Lu Xun Arts Academy in the music department. Within half a year of arriving in Yan'an, Zheng composed his breakthrough song Singing of Yan'an with lyrics by Mo Ye. At a performance, he and soprano Tang Rongmei sang the piece, which impressed Mao Zedong. The song was later renamed Ode to Yan'an by the CCP's Propaganda Department and became widely popular, even spreading overseas. In 1993, it was recognized as one of the 20th century's classic works of Chinese music.

Between 1938 and 1939, Zheng entered his first creative peak, composing well-known pieces such as Ode to Yan'an and Ballad of the Yan River. After graduating from the Lu Xun Arts Academy, he was assigned as a music director in the propaganda department of the Anti-Japanese Military and Political University. In the winter of 1938, he collaborated with poet Gong Mu to create Chorus of the Eighth Route Army, a set of eight songs, including Army Song, Military Anthem of the Eighth Route Army, Cavalry Song, Artillery Song, Happy Eighth Route Army, Ode to the Midnight Sentry, Army and People as One, and The Eighth Route Army and the New Fourth Army.

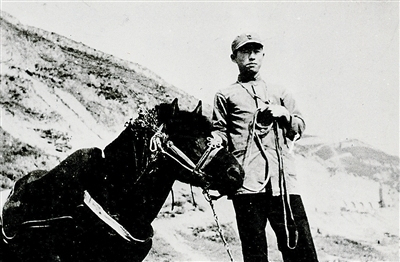
Zheng in 1942

In 1939, Zheng became a probationary member of the Chinese Communist Party, and in May the same year, a full member. However, suspicions arose within the Party due to his Korean background, past connections in Nanjing and his work in eavesdropping Japanese communications. Under Kang Sheng's leadership, Zheng was once accused of being a Japanese spy. Thanks to recognition for his musical contributions, his Party membership was preserved. In January 1941, the Korean Youth League was established in the Taihang anti-Japanese base, with Mu Chong as chairman. In May, the Korean Volunteer Army also arrived there. By July, he was elected chairman of the Korean Youth Federation branch in Shaanxi-Gansu-Ningxia Border Region. In February 1942, during the Yan'an Rectification Movement, Zheng's spy suspicion continued. Determined to prove himself, he sought to go to the front lines. With Mu Chong's help, he was allowed to move to the Taihang front in August. There, he joined the Eighth Route Army's armed propaganda team, working alongside three Korean compatriots and a Japanese defector, carrying out missions in enemy-occupied areas. By autumn 1943, as the war shifted against Japan, Zheng began retreating with the Taihang forces back toward Yan'an. He finally returned to Yan'an on 7 April 1944.

=== In North Korea ===
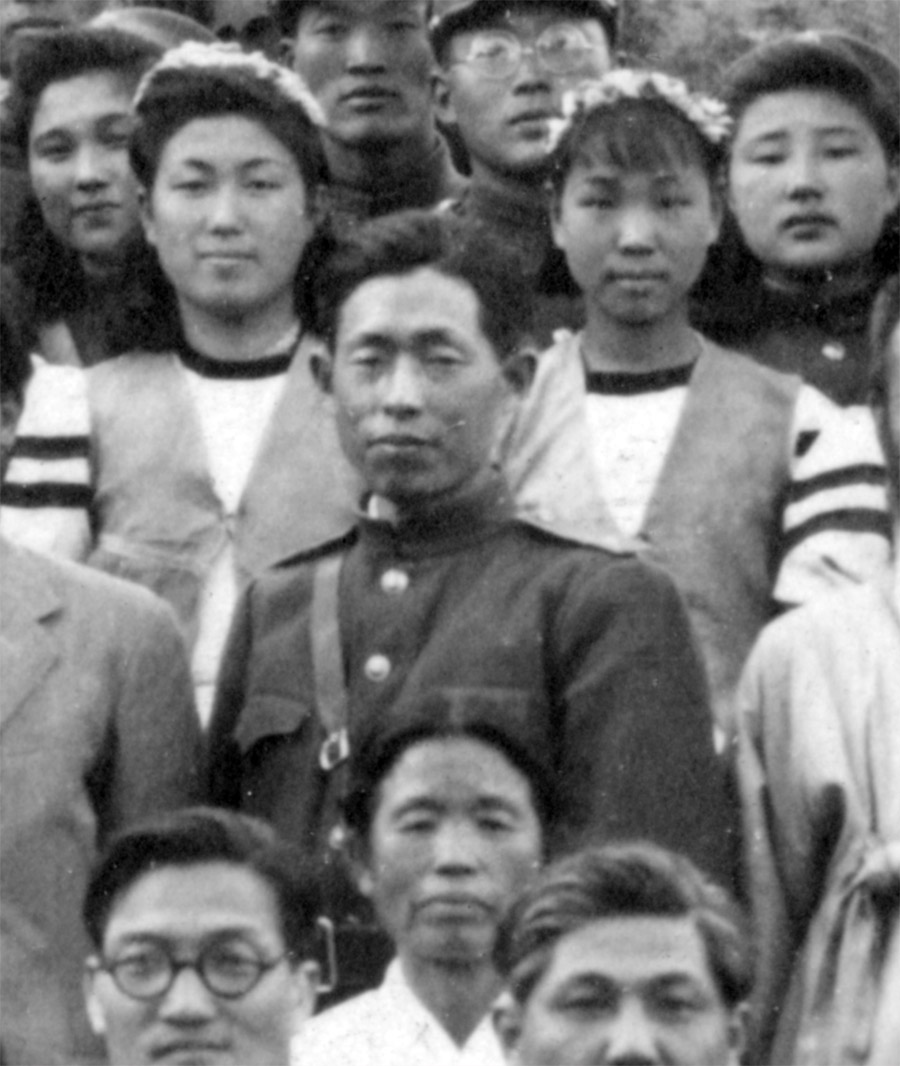
Zheng (center) as the director of the Korean People's Army ensemble (1946)

In August 1945, after Japan announced its surrender, commander-in-chief of the Eighth Route Army Zhu De ordered Korean units in China to move to Northeast China to liberate Korea. Hearing the news, Zheng composed March Toward the Motherland. On 3 September, he left for the Northeast with his wife and daughter, composing March of 1 March and March of Korean Liberation along the way.

By December 1945, he reached Pyongyang, Soviet-occupied Northern Korea. In early 1946, he became propaganda minister in Hwanghae Province, North Korea, and his CCP membership was shifted to the Korean Workers' Party. From 1946 to 1947, following General Secretary of the Workers' Party of Korea Kim Il Sung's call for patriotic songs, he composed the Military Anthem of the Korean People's Army and set music to the Korean poem The Tumen River. From 1947 to 1948, he served as director of the Korean People's Army ensemble, and his March of the Korean People's Army was officially adopted as the army song. That year he reunited with family in Pyongyang and received the title of 'Model Worker'. Meanwhile, his wife Ding Xuesong rose in political rank, becoming secretary-general of the Overseas Chinese Committee and later head of the Overseas Chinese Federation in North Korea. In early 1949, Ding began serving as Head of the Overseas Chinese Federation's Chinese Business Delegation and changed Zheng's party affiliation from the Workers' Party back to the CCP. In 1949, because his wife was Chinese, Zheng was removed from the Korean People's Army and reassigned as head of the composition department at the Pyongyang University of Music and Dance.

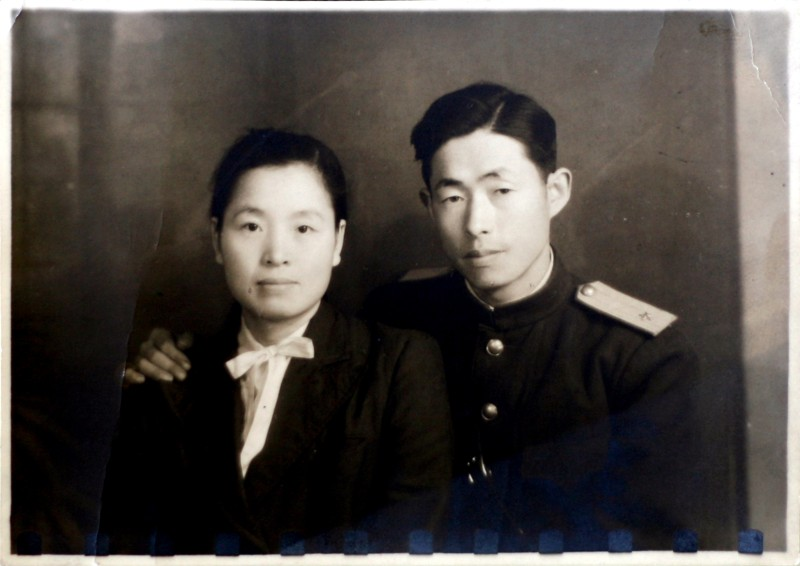
Zheng, wearing the uniform of the Korean People's Army, and his wife Ding Xuesong in Pyongyang (1947)

In the autumn of the same year, Ding was appointed Xinhua News Agency's special correspondent in North Korea and was soon promoted to director of the Xinhua's Pyongyang branch. In 1950, after the outbreak of the Korean War, China established an embassy in Pyongyang, and Ding was appointed a diplomat. Due to her status as a Chinese official made Zheng increasingly difficult to integrate into the mainstream North Korean society. With the help of Premier of China Zhou Enlai, Kim Il Sung permitted them to return to China, where Zheng took Chinese citizenship.

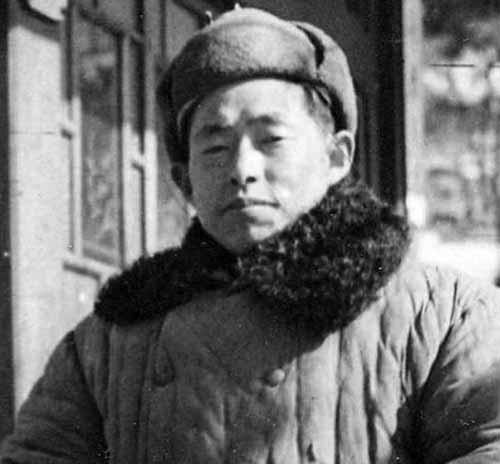
Zheng as a soldier in the People's Volunteer Army during the Korean War (1950)

In December 1950, Zheng returned to Korean battlefield as a member of the Chinese People's Volunteer Army. In the trenches, he composed battle songs such as Singing of Mount Paektu, Dedicated to the Heroes on the Han River Frontline, March of the Chinese People's Volunteer Army and Ten Praises of the Volunteer Army. In January 1951, following the capture of Seoul by the Chinese during the Third Battle of Seoul, he discovered two large volumes containing eighteen sets of ancient Korean court music scores among the ruins of war. Years later, Zheng's wife would return these scores as a gift to South Korea.

=== Return to China ===
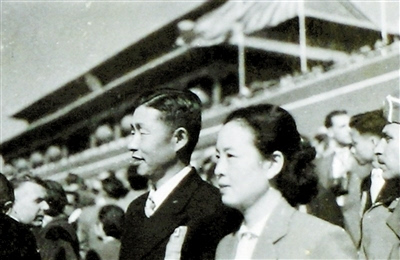
Zheng and his wife at the Tiananmen Square in Beijing (1950)

In April 1951, Zheng returned to China and worked at the Beijing People's Art Theatre. That July, he attended the 3rd World Festival of Youth and Students in East Berlin. In the early 1950s, he composed works such as Voice of Peace and Song on the River. In 1953, he became head of the creative group at the Central Song and Dance Ensemble, writing songs like Logging Song and Song of the Snow on the Greater Khingan Mountains, as well as naval and military songs such as The Powerful Fleet Marches on the Sea, Fisherman's Song on the Sea and The Gunboat Brigade Dispatched.

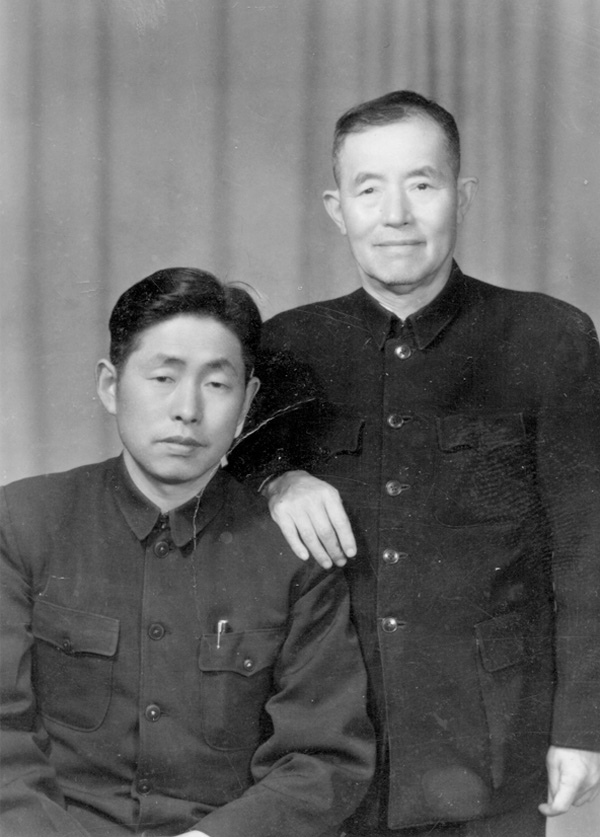
Zheng with Xu Jiarui, the playwright of the opera Cloud Gazing, in Kunming, Yunnan (1957)

In 1955, Zheng moved to the Central Orchestra where he worked on Chinese-language, Western-style opera. He composed How Happy We Are and March of Friendship and Peace. In 1956, he became a member of the Chinese Musicians' Association. Between 1956 and 1958, he traveled widely across Hunan, Guangxi, Yunnan, Guizhou and Fujian where he drew local folk traditions to create songs such as Song of Young Athletes, Beautiful Qingdao, Song of Railway Workers, Happy Childhood and We Are the People's Motorboat Soldiers. While in Yunnan, he collaborated on the opera Cloud Gazing, which was based on ethnic legend of the Bai people. Around this time, he also began setting Mao Zedong's poetry to music, including The Long March and Loushan Pass.

In 1959, during the Anti-Rightist Campaign, Zheng was falsely accused of being 'anti-Party' and 'right-leaning', and even of dividing the Chinese Musicians' Association. As a result, his major choral work on the Autumn Harvest Uprising was banned. In 1962, after the Party corrected the excesses of the campaign, his name was cleared, and Cloud Gazing was staged in Beijing but was banned quickly after Mao criticized Western-style operas. In the early 1960s, Zheng continued to compose patriotic and military music, including Air Force songs such as Song of the Pilots and Forward, People's Air Force.

When the Cultural Revolution began in 1966, Zheng was publicly denounced and locked in a cowshed-style prison. He was briefly released in 1967 when Jiang Qing and others ordered his reinstatement, but he was soon targeted again, accused of being a 'South Korean spy' and 'enemy element'. He survived largely thanks to colleagues who proved his revolutionary past with testimonies. Throughout the 1970s, Zheng was forced to compose revolutionary works, including film scores, despite his reluctance. Following the end of the Cultural Revolution in 1976, Zheng returned to creative work, planning a symphony on Yan'an, an opera about Norman Bethune and a friendship symphony. On 30 November, his work Tit for Tat was staged in Beijing. On 5 December, he was invited by the Zhangjiakou Peking Opera Troupe to perform the Peking Opera 1 August Storm. After the performance, Zheng toasted with the artists. Although he suffered from high blood pressure and never smoked or drank, he drank and smoked to celebrate the return of Premier Zhou Enlai's image to the stage after the smashing the Gang of Four. The next day, Zheng braved the snow and wind in a jeep and returned home. On the morning of 7 December, he felt dizzy and took a jeep back to Zhangjiakou to the suburbs to breathe fresh air. He fainted by the canal in Changping District, Beijing. After being sent to the hospital for treatment, he died at 17:10 on the afternoon of 7 December 1976 at the age of 62. His memorial was held at Beijing's Babaoshan Revolutionary Cemetery, attended by Hu Yaobang, Wang Zhen and Liao Chengzhi. He was then buried at the cemetery.

== Personal life ==
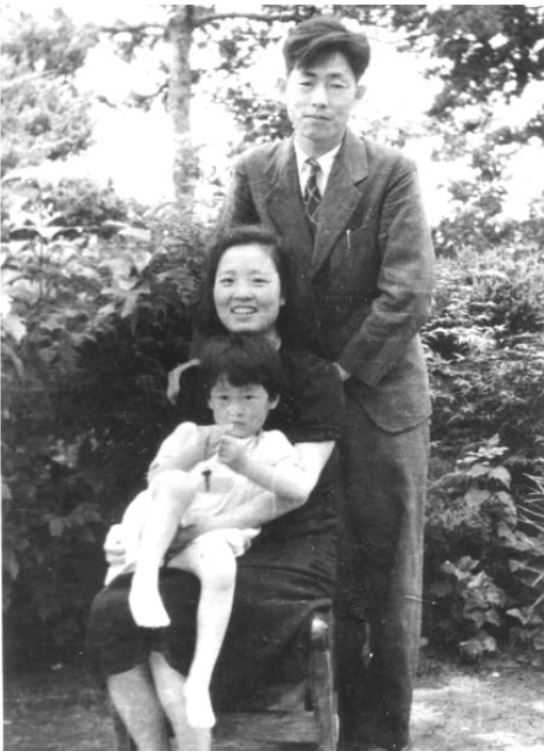
Zheng with his wife and daughter in North Korea (1948)

While in Yan'an, Zheng married Ding Xuesong in 1941, who was then secretary to Li Dingming, the vice chair of Shaanxi-Gansu-Ningxia Border Region. The couple had a daughter, Zheng Xiaoti. Ding would become the first female ambassador of the People's Republic of China when she was appointed as ambassador to the Netherlands and then Denmark, from 1979 to 1984.

== Commemoration ==
In 1992, North Korea released movie Musician Zheng Lücheng, personally overseen by Kim Jong Il, with the script based on research in China. In 2002, China's Changchun Film Studio made Towards the Sun, which depicted Zheng's life. In March 2015, Chinese and South Korean film studios co-produced movie Young Zheng Lücheng.

He has been commemorated also in the following ways in China and South Korea:

China:

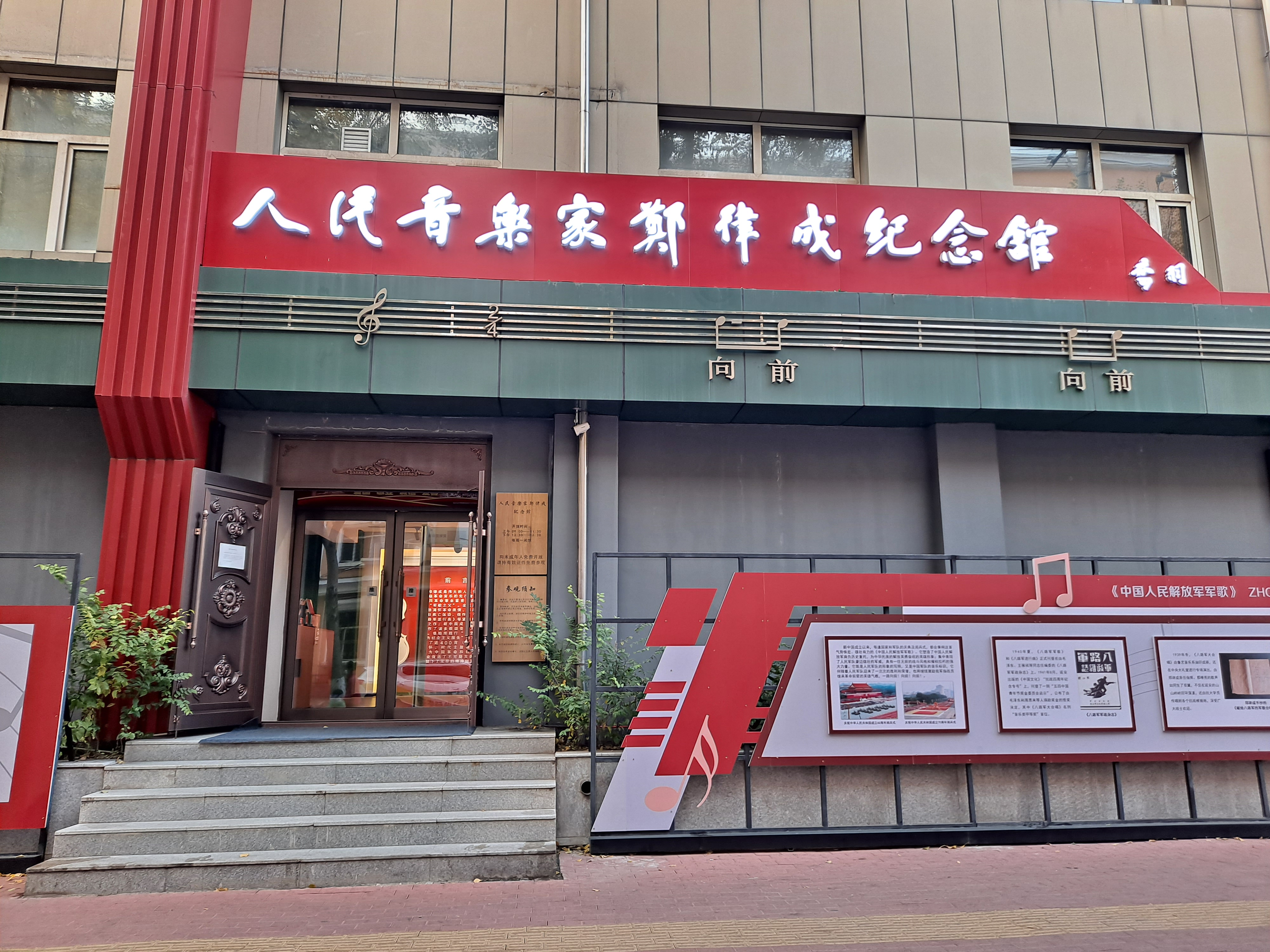
Zheng Lücheng Memorial Hall in Harbin, China

- On the first anniversary of Zheng Lücheng's death, six art troupes including the Central Orchestra jointly held a concert of his works.
- On the tenth anniversary of his death, concerts of Zheng's music were held both in Beijing and Yanbian. Publishing houses in Liaoning and Yanbian published works related to him.
- On 25 July 1988, Deng Xiaoping, then Chairman of the Central Military Commission of China, issued an order designating Zheng's March of the Chinese People's Liberation Army as the Military Anthem of the People's Liberation Army.
- In 1997, on the occasion of the 70th anniversary of the founding of the People' Liberation Army, Beijing held a concert of Zheng's works. Inscriptions were written by Li Ruihuan ("A loyal heart for the nation, singing boldly forward."), Song Ping ("The Ode to Yan'an resounds across China, the March surges like a tempest") and Chi Haotian ("A monument to glorious years, a voice urging progress").
- In 2005, a memorial hall in honor of him was built in Harbin.
- In 2009, on the 60th anniversary of the founding of the People's Republic of China, Zheng was named by the Central Propaganda Department and ten other ministries as one of the '100 Heroes and Models Who Made Outstanding Contributions to the Founding of New China'.
- On 25 July 2009, Heilongjiang Province and Harbin City jointly hosted a concert marking the 70th anniversary of the birth of the PLA anthem, featuring Zheng's works. Harbin also held an exhibition titled 'The People's Musician Zheng Lücheng: A Life in Deeds'.
- In 2012, the Ministry of Culture of the People's Republic of China oversaw the establishment of the 'Zheng Lücheng Music Fund' under the China Social and Cultural Development Foundation.
- In 2014, on the centennial of Zheng's birth, the National Centre for the Performing Arts in Beijing staged a concert commemorating his birth.
- An art theater in Yanbian University in Yanji is named after him.

South Korea:

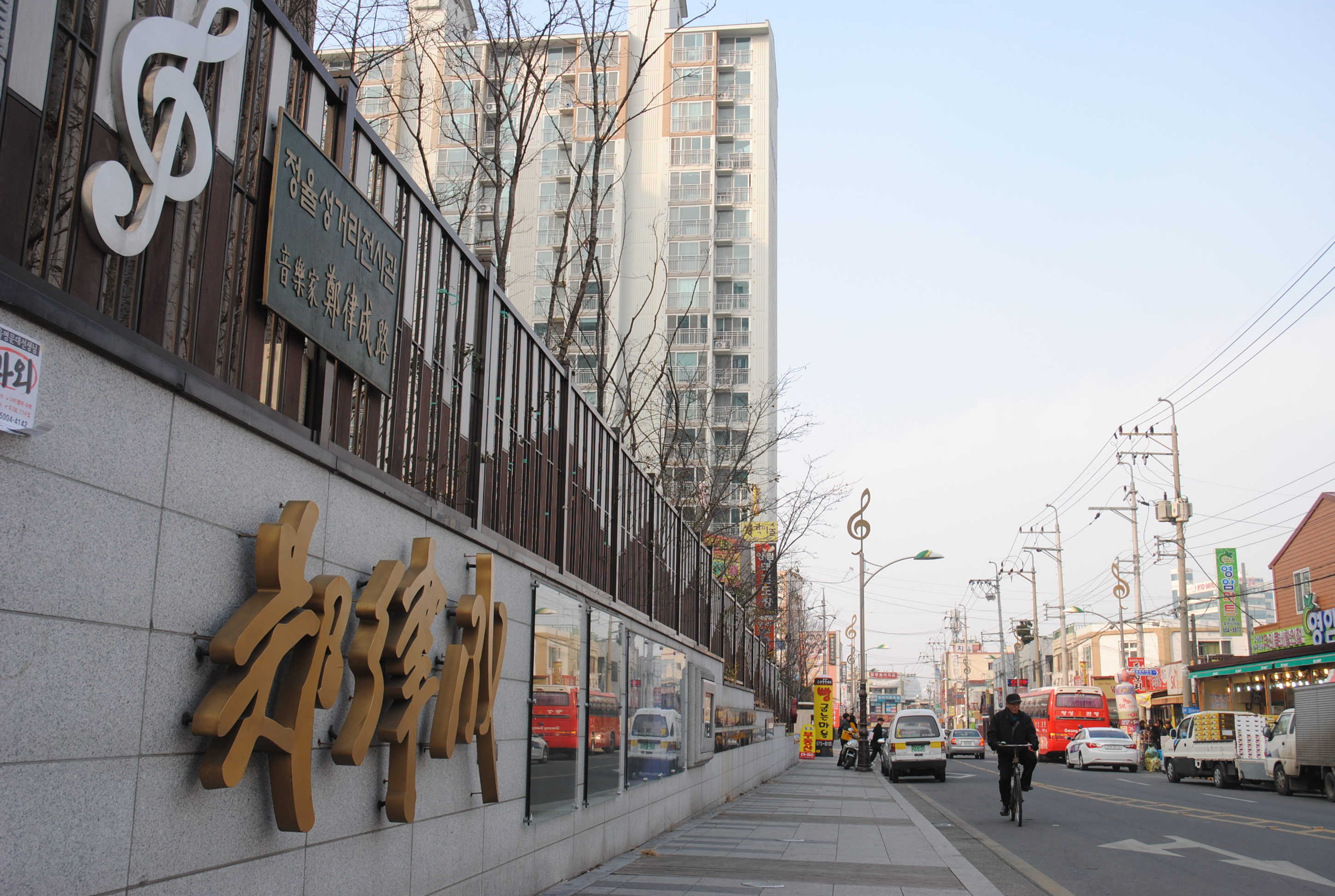
Zheng's former residence in Yangnim-dong, Gwangju

- Zheng's former residence at his birthplace in Yangnim-dong, Gwangju, was turned into an exhibition hall honoring him.
- In November 2005, China and South Korea jointly hosted the first 'Zheng Lücheng International Music Festival' in Gwangju, his birthplace.
- Since 2014, Gwangju Munhwa Broadcasting Corporation in South Korea holds the annual 'Zheng Lücheng Children's Song Festival Competition'.
- In 2014, on the centennial of Zheng's birthday, Gwangju held a cultural festival celebrating Zheng.

=== Controversy in commemorating Zheng in South Korea ===
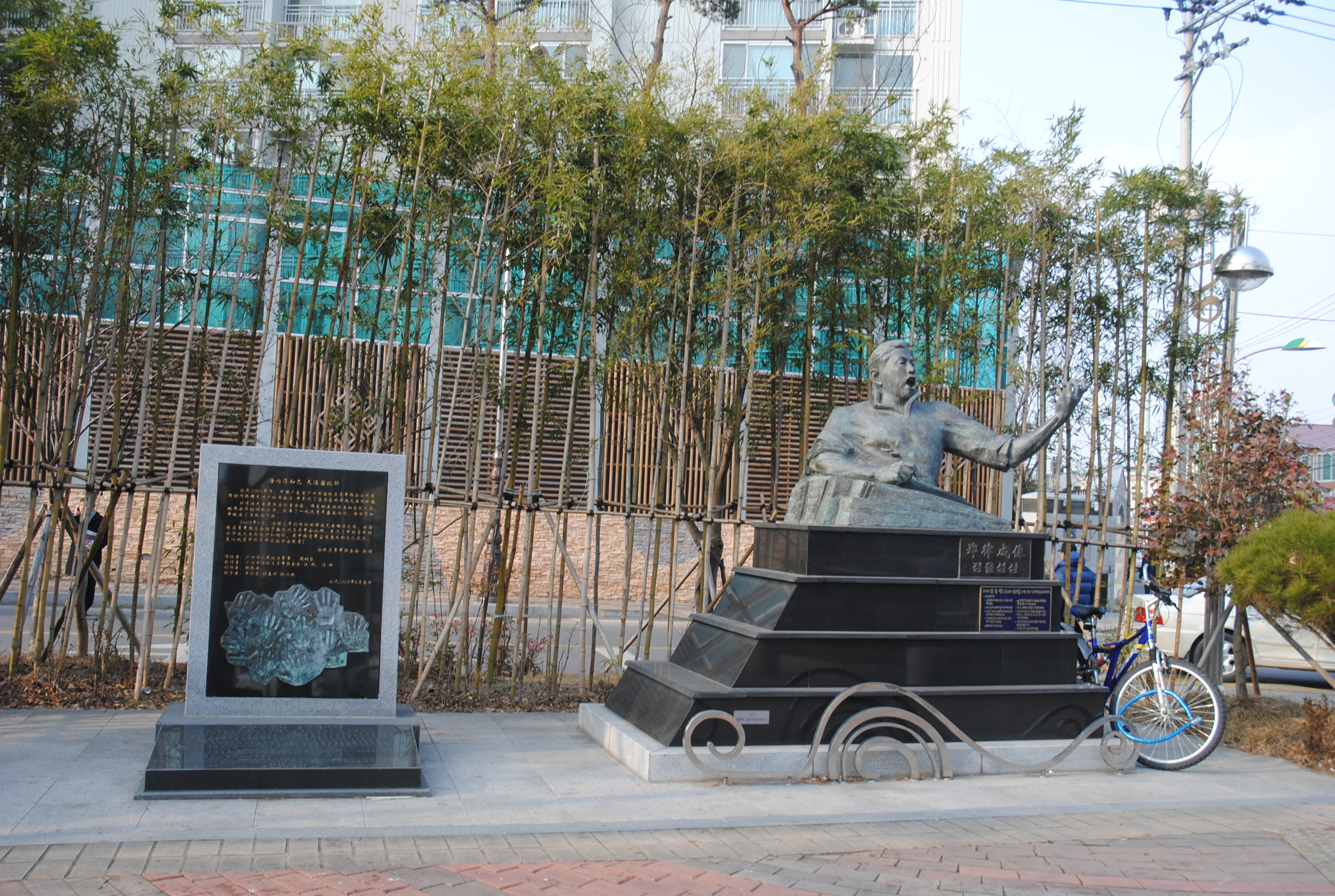
Statue honoring Zheng at his former residence in Gwangju

Because South Korea has long upheld anti-communism as a national policy, Zheng, a member of the Chinese Communist Party who composed songs in support of North Korea, was neither honored nor widely introduced for many decades. According to professor Noh Gi-wook of Chonnam National University, Zheng only began to gain recognition in South Korea with the advent of Nordpolitik. On 24 August 1992, when South Korea and China established diplomatic relations, his music was performed at celebratory events.

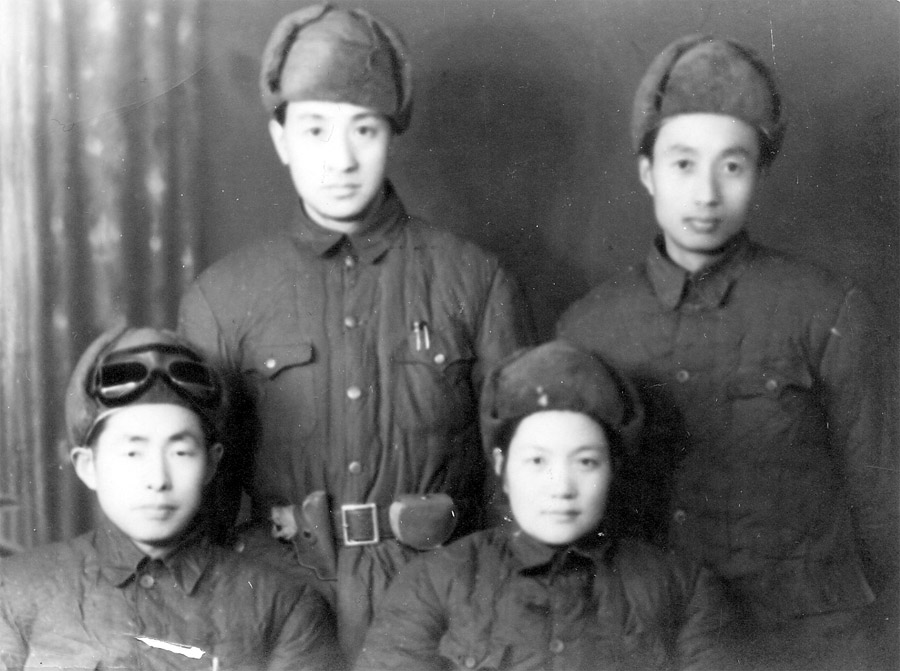
Zheng (bottom left) as a soldier in the Chinese People's Volunteer Army during the Korean War. Zheng's support of China and North Korea has been a source of controversy when it came to honoring him in South Korea.

As the Cold War ended and ideological rigidity softened, opposition to socialist states, including China, waned. From the 2000s, Zheng, being a native of Gwangju, started to be spotlighted as the 'saint of Chinese music' and 'the musician who shook a continent of 1.3 billion'. During the boom of Chinese tourism to Korea, Gwangju promoted him as a cultural tourism brand, restoring his birthplace and holding commemorative projects. From 2005, Gwangju hosted an annual Zheng Lucheng Music Festival, praising him as a 'pioneer of the Korean Wave in China' and employing his image as part of a friendly strategy with China to yield economic benefits. However, conservative critics opposed glorifying someone who was remembered only vaguely as an anti-Japanese activist, but who had supported North Korea and the People's Republic of China in the Korean War and had been praised by Kim Il Sung. The monthly magazine Chosun condemned the commemoration as "a typical case of money worship", and Professor Noh himself doubted whether Gwangju had any reason to celebrate him so fervently.

In 2017, during a state visit to China, then President of South Korea Moon Jae-in gave a speech at Peking University where he praised Zheng as the symbol of Korea-China friendship. On the same year, Zheng's family nominated him for the posthumous award of the Order of Merit for National Foundation. However, the Ministry of Patriots and Veterans Affairs of South Korea conducted a review where they claimed they found no objective evidence for Zheng's claim that he had participated in the anti-Japanese movement in China. In addition, the ministry expressed its internal opposition, arguing that it was against the law to posthumously award him given that he had clearly acted in support of North Korea and China during the Korean War. Ultimately, at the third meeting of the third Subcommittee of the first Meritorious Service Review Committee for Independence Activists in 2018, the ministry rejected awarding him the Order of Merit for National Foundation, stating that "not only were his achievements in the independence movement not uncovered, but his activities related to the North Korean regime after liberation were too clearly revealed."

On 25 March 2019, Na Kyung-won, then parliamentary leader of the Liberty Korea Party, stated at a press conference that Zheng was a figure who composed revolutionary military songs infused with communist ideology. Na further criticized that while venerating Zheng in this way, there was simultaneously a movement to replace school anthems in South Korea composed by individuals labeled as pro-Japanese collaborators.

In August 2022, the Korean magazine Monthly Chosun criticized Gwangju and Hwasun County for honoring Zheng. The article accused the city of valuing tourism profits over national identity. In August 2023, Gwangju announced plans to spend 4.8 billion won on a memorial park in honor of Zheng to attract Chinese tourists. This was condemned by the Ministry of Patriots and Veterans Affairs, which stressed Zheng's role as a North Korean military musician and Chinese People's Volunteer Army supporter during the war. President Yoon Suk-yeol also voiced concerns regarding the building of the park. In October 2023, Zheng's bust in Gwangju was twice vandalized. Soon after, government ministries urged the city to halt the project, remove monuments and even rename the road named in honor of him. In November, a former Gwangju district head publicly apologized for previously promoting projects related to Zheng. In December 2023, 1600 South Korean military veterans' families protested in front of Gwangju City Hall, calling Zheng a 'war criminal' for composing the March of the Korean People's Army. Mayor of Gwangju Kang Gi-jung dismissed the protest as outdated and insisted the memorial project was vital for tourism.

By January 2024, Gwangju and Hwasun began scaling back projects honoring Zheng such as canceling music festivals, changing a planned exhibition hall into a cultural center and reviewing memorial plans. However, construction of the park continued as scheduled. On 25 January, Chinese Foreign Ministry spokesperson Wang Wenbin defended commemoration of Zheng, saying local Korean projects had long contributed to China–Korea friendship and warning against letting ideology or domestic politics damage bilateral ties. In April 2024, Hwasun County removed Zheng's bust, memorial classroom and portrait from a local elementary school after public surveys showed strong public opposition towards Zheng.

In July 2024, lawmaker Na Kyung-won visited the memorial park site with veterans' families, demanding the project's cancellation and replacement with a democracy memorial. Mayor Kang rejected this criticism, saying the city would resolve the issue itself. Later that month, Gwangju decided not send any representatives to attend Zheng's 110th birthday commemorations in Harbin, China. By September 2024, Mayor of Seoul Oh Se-hoon denounced local memorials for Zheng as a distortion of history, pointing out his membership in both the Chinese and North Korean communist parties and his compositions praising their armies. In October 2024, veterans' groups again protested at Gwangju City Hall, demanding that the park project be scrapped and replaced with a modern history park.

In August 2025, Nam District in Gwangju received a request from the Chinese consulate to reinstall the bust of Zheng and initially planned to restore it by September, citing diplomatic considerations. The decision drew criticism from the Association of Bereaved Families of Military and Police Officers Killed in Action, who questioned honoring someone with no contribution to Korea, while the Chinese consulate welcomed the move. On 19 August 2025, Yonhap reported that Nam District decided to suspend the restoration plan, taking into account opposition from veterans' organizations. Mayor of Gwangju Kim Byeong-no stated that the matter would be "reviewed carefully."

On 6 February 2026, Chinese Ambassador to South Korea Dai Bing visited Gwangju for the first time since assuming office. He visited the street named after Zheng in Nam District and met with the Mayor of Gwangju Kang Gi-jung. During the meeting with Kang, Dai argued that, just as anti-Japanese historical sites such as the location of the Provisional Government of the Republic of Korea established in Shanghai were being properly managed and preserved in China, the bust of Zheng should likewise be restored. On 11 February 2026, civic groups in Gwangju held a press conference criticising Dai Bing for calling for the restoration of the bust of Zheng. In a joint statement, 38 organizations, including the "Pan-Citizen Solidarity for the Withdrawal of the Zheng Lücheng Park Project", argued that remarks intended to influence a local government regarding commemorative projects for a specific individual were inappropriate.

On 14 February 2026, newspaper The Chosun Ilbo criticised Dai Bing in an editorial for demanding the restoration of the bust of Zheng. The newspaper argued that Zheng had fought on the North Korean side during the Korean War and questioned commemorating him in South Korea. It also claimed that the ambassador's remarks reflected growing Chinese interference encouraged by the South Korean government's accommodating stance toward Beijing.

== Bibliography ==
- Fan, Xian; Shi, Lixia (2017). Jūn gē de dànshēng:"Zhōngguó rénmín jiěfàngjūn jūn gē" 中国人民解放军军歌 [The Birth of the Military Song: A Biography of Gong Mu and Zheng Lücheng, Lyricists and Composers of the 'Chinese People's Liberation Army Song'] (in Chinese). Jīnchéng chūbǎn shè. ISBN 9787515514963.
- Lee, Lily Xiao Hong; Stefanowska, Anna (1998). Biographical Dictionary of Chinese Women (Hardcover). M.E. Sharpe. ISBN 9780765607980.
- Li, Huishan (2014). Zhènglǜchéng píngzhuàn 郑律成评传 [A Critical Biography of Zheng Lücheng] (in Chinese). Zuòjiā chūbǎn shè. ISBN 9787506374644.
- Wang, Heping (2010). Xiàngzhe tàiyáng gēchàng: Jiědú zhènglǜchéng 向着太阳歌唱：解读郑律成 [Singing Towards the Sun: An Interpretation of Zheng Lücheng] (in Chinese). Zhōngyāng biānyì chūbǎn shè. ISBN 9787511703507.
- Jiang, Ye (2014). Zhènglǜchéng 郑律成 [Zheng Lücheng] (in Chinese). Héběi rénmín chūbǎn shè. ISBN 9787202094471.
- Zheng, Xiaoti; Zhao, Ying (2011). 100 Wèi wèi xīn zhōngguó chénglì zuòchū túchū gòngxiàn de yīngxióng mófàn rénwù: Zhènglǜchéng 100位为新中国成立作出突出贡献的英雄模范人物：郑律成 [100 Heroes and Model Figures Who Made Outstanding Contributions to the Founding of New China: Zheng Lücheng] (in Chinese). Jílín wénshǐ chūbǎn shè. ISBN 9787547205754.
