= Love Amongst War =

Chinese television series

- Genre: Historical
- Written by: Jian Yuanxin
- Directed by: Lin Tianyi
- Starring: Benny Chan; Jessica Hsuan; Angel Lou
- Opening theme: Han Yuanyuan, Yang Haodong Legend
- Ending theme: Zhao Yunhan The Last Tear
- Country of origin: China
- Original language: Mandarin
- No. of episodes: 48

Production
- Executive producers: Zhao Yifang; Jian Yuanxin
- Production location: Hengdian World Studios
- Production companies: Zhejiang Chongyuan Cultural Company; Huace Film and Television Company

Original release
- Network: Zhejiang Television
- Release: April 19 – May 20, 2012

Love Amongst War
- Traditional Chinese: 薛平貴與王寶釧
- Simplified Chinese: 薛平贵与王宝钏
Transcriptions
Standard Mandarin
- Hanyu Pinyin: Xuē Píngguì Yǔ Wāng Băochuān

Love Amongst War (Chinese: 薛平贵与王宝钏) is a Chinese historical television series about the life of Xue Pinggui, a legendary hero in Chinese folklore, and based on the events in the Xiantong era of Emperor Yizong of the Tang dynasty. The series was written and produced by Jian Yuanxin, and directed by Lin Tianyi. The series stars Benny Chan, Jessica Hsuan, and Angel Lou.

== Cast ==
- Benny Chan as Emperor Xuānzong of Tang/ Xue Pinggui.
- Jessica Hsuan as Wang Baochuan, the third daughter of Prime Minister, Xue Pinggui's wife, Empress of Tang Dynasty.
- Angel Lou as Dai Zhan, the Princess of Xiliang Kingdom, Xue Pinggui's concubine.

=== Other ===
- Yumiko Cheng as Xue Pinggui's mother, a concubine of Emperor Xuānzong of Tang.
- Monica Mu as Concubine Yu, a concubine of Emperor Xuānzong of Tang.
- Hong Zhongyi as Wang Yun, Wang Baochuan's father, the Prime Minister of Tang Dynasty.
- Xue Shujie as Wang Baochuan's mother.
- Zhang Yongqi as Wang Jinchuan, the eldest daughter of Prime Minister Wang, Xue Baochuan's sister.
- Chen Yizhen as Wang Yinchuan, the second daughter of Prime Minister Wang, Xue Baochuan's sister.
- Zhang Di as Su Long, Wang Jinchuan's husband, the son-in-law of Prime Minister Wang.
- Lou Yajiang as Wei Hu, Wang Yinchuan's wife, the son-in-law of Prime Minister Wang.
- Candy Tu as Xue Qi, Xue Pinggui's sworn sister.
- Chen Weimin as Ge Da, Xue Pinggui's sworn brother.
- Zhang Liang as Wei Bao, Xue Qi's husband.
- Zhou Danli as Xiao Lian, Wang Baochuan's servant girl.
- Zhao Xi as the King of Xiliang Kingdom.
- Tai-Feng Hsia as the Empress of Xiliang Kingdom.
- Ye Zuxin as Ye Xing, the eunuch who saved Xue Pinggui.
- Xin Zi as princess Dai Zhan, daughter of the Empress of Xiliang Kingdom.
- Yuan Xin Ran as Li Na, princess Dai Zhan's servant girl.

== Release ==
It was a hit TV drama in Mainland China and Taiwan.

== Critical response ==
The series received mixed reviews.
