= Military Anthem of the People's Liberation Army =

Patriotic song of the People's Republic of China

Military Anthem of the People's Liberation Army of China 中国人民解放军军歌
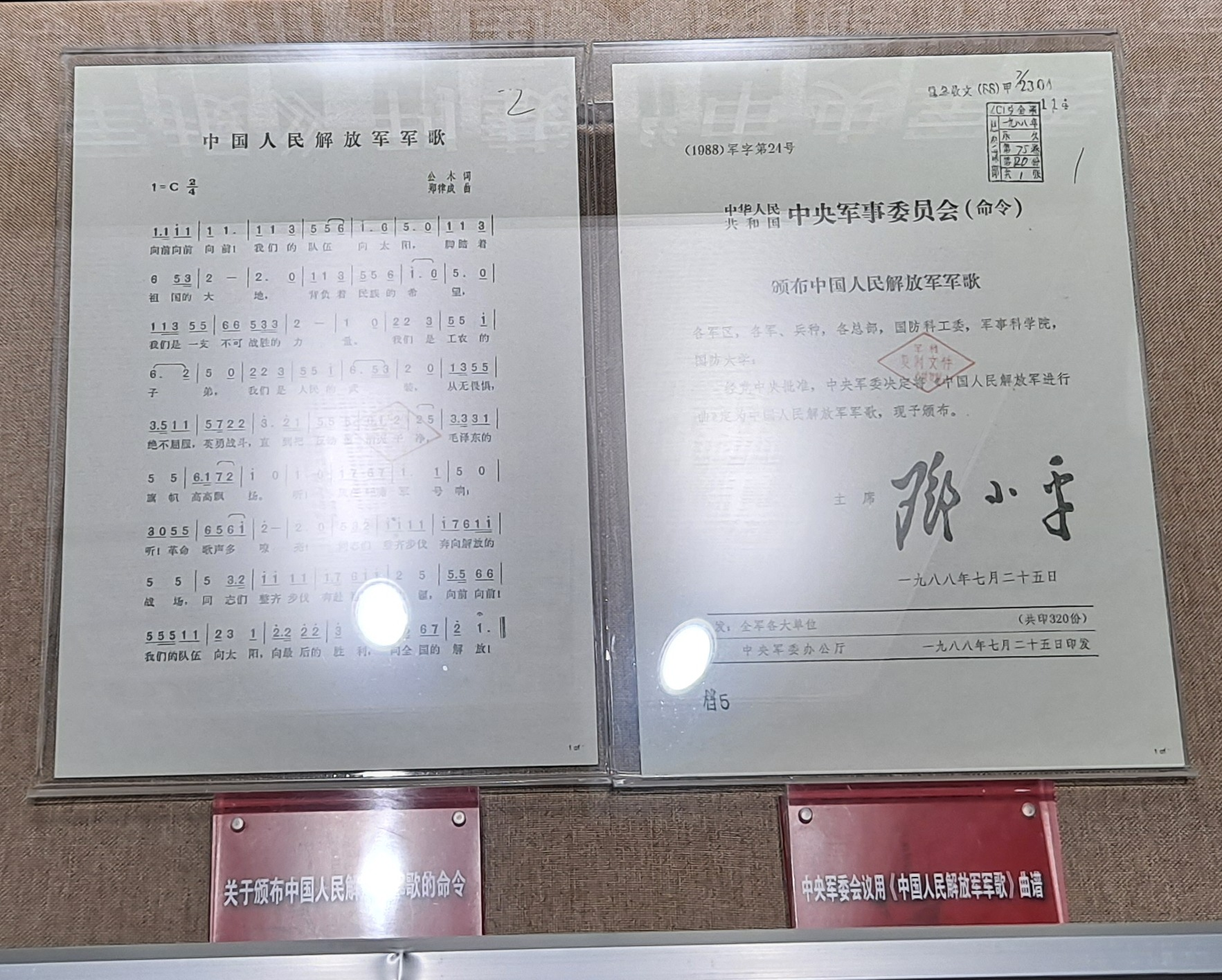
- Military anthem of the People's Liberation Army
- Lyrics: Zhang Yongnian
- Music: Zheng Lücheng
- Adopted: 25 July 1988; 38 years ago

Audio sample
- "Military Anthem of the Chinese People's Liberation Army" (instrumental): file; help

The Military Anthem of the People's Liberation Army of China (simplified Chinese: 中国人民解放军军歌; traditional Chinese: 中國人民解放軍軍歌; pinyin: Zhōngguó Rénmín Jiěfàngjūn Jūngē), also known as the March of the Chinese People's Liberation Army of China (simplified Chinese: 中国人民解放军进行曲; traditional Chinese: 中國人民解放軍進行曲; pinyin: Zhōngguó Rénmín Jiěfàngjūn Jìnxíngqǔ), is a patriotic song of the People's Republic of China. The song was written by Zhang Yongnian and composed by Zheng Lücheng.

== History ==
The song was originally written as "March of the Eighth Route Army" (simplified Chinese: 八路军进行曲; traditional Chinese: 八路軍進行曲; pinyin: Bālùjūn Jìnxíngqǔ), and was one of the six songs in the chorus of Eighth Route Army (simplified Chinese: 八路军大合唱; traditional Chinese: 八路軍大合唱; pinyin: Bālùjūn Dàhéchàng), all of which had Gong Mu as songwriter and Zheng Lücheng as the composer. The song became known as the "March of the Liberation Army" (simplified Chinese: 解放军进行曲; traditional Chinese: 解放軍進行曲; pinyin: Jiěfàngjūn Jìnxíngqǔ) during the second Chinese Civil War. The lyrics were re-edited by the General Political Department in 1951 and the song renamed to "March of the Chinese PLA" in 1965.

On July 25, 1988, the Chairman of the Central Military Commission Deng Xiaoping signed a decree to use the song as the official anthem of the People's Liberation Army.

== Variant ==
A variant form of the song called "Parade March of the PLA" (simplified Chinese: 分列式进行曲; traditional Chinese: 分列式進行曲; pinyin: Fēnlièshì Jìnxíngqǔ) is used as the main theme of the marching of formative military parade, such as that in Chinese National Day Parade. From 1949 onwards, this has been the march past tune of the PLA in every military parade.

== Lyrics ==
向前！向前！向前！
我们的队伍向太阳，
脚踏着祖国的大地，
背负着民族的希望
我们是一只不可战胜的力量
我们是工农的子弟，
我们是人民的武装
从无畏惧，绝不屈服，英勇战斗，
直到把反动派消灭干净，
毛泽东的旗帜高高飘扬
听！风在呼啸军号向，
听！革命歌声多嘹亮！
同志们整齐步伐奔向解放的战场，
同志们整齐步伐奔赴祖国的边疆，
向前！向前！我们的队伍向太阳，
向最后的胜利，向全国的解放！

Xiàng qián! Xiàng qián! Xiàng qián!
Wǒmen de duìwuǐ xiàng tàiyáng
Jiǎo tàzhe zǔguo de dàdì
Bēifùzhe mínzú de xīwàng,
Wǒmen shì yī zhī bùkě zhànshèng de lìliang!
Wǒmen shì gōngnóng de zǐdì
Wǒmen shì ren mín de wǔzhuāng
Cōng wú wèijù, juébù qūfú, yīngyǒng zhàndòu,
Zhídào bǎ fǎndòngpài xiāomiè gānjìng,
Máo Zédōng de qízhì gāogāo piāoyáng!
Tīng! Fēng zài hūxiào jūnháo xiǎng,
Tīng! Gémìng gēshēng duō liáoliàng!
Tóngzhìmen zhěngqí bùfá bēnxiàng jiěfàng de zhànchǎng
Tóngzhìmen zhěngqí bùfá bēnfù zǔguó de biānjiāng.
Xiàng qián! Xiàng qián! Wǒmen de duìwǔ xiàng tàiyáng,
Xiàng zuìhòu de shènglì, Xiàng quánguó de jiěfàng!

Forward! Forward! Forward!
Our army faces towards the Sun,
Stepping on the earth of Motherland,
Carrying the hope of our nation,
We are an invincible power!
We are the sons of workers and farmers
We are the arms of the People!
Fearless, unyielding, to fight bravely
Until we exterminate all reactionaries.
The banner of Mao Zedong flutters high!
Listen! The wind is roaring and the bugle is blowing;
Listen! How thunderously our revolutionary song roars!
Comrades, march forth united to the battlefields of liberation;
Comrades, march forth united to the frontiers of Motherland.
Forward！ Forward！Our army faces towards the Sun;
Towards the final victory, to the liberation of all our land!

== See also ==
- 60th anniversary of the People's Republic of China
- March of the Volunteers
- Military anthem of China
