= Military Anthem of the Eighth Route Army =

The Military Anthem of the Eighth Route Army (simplified Chinese: 八路军军歌; traditional Chinese: 八路軍軍歌; pinyin: Bālùjūn Jūngē) is a patriotic song of the People's Republic of China. Since the Eighth Route Army was a special route army within the National Revolutionary Army of the Republic of China, it also can be considered as a patriotic song of the Republic of China. This song is one of the six songs comprising The Grand Chorus of the Eighth Route Army, with all words by Gong Mu, and music by Zheng Lücheng.

== Lyrics ==
| Simplified | Traditional | Pinyin | English Translation |
|---|---|---|---|
| 铁流两万五千里，直向着一个坚定的方向， 苦斗十年，锻炼成一支不可战胜的力量。 一旦强虏寇边疆，慷慨悲歌上战场， 首战平型关，威名天下扬。 嘿！ 游击战，敌后方，铲除伪政权， 游击战、敌后方，坚持反扫荡， 钢刀插在敌胸膛。 巍峨长白山，滔滔鸭绿江，誓复失地逐强梁。 争民族独立，求人类解放， 这神圣的重大责任，都担在我们双肩。 | 鐵流兩萬五千里，直向著一個堅定的方向， 苦鬥十年，鍛煉成一支不可戰勝的力量。 一旦強虜寇邊疆，慷慨悲歌上戰場， 首戰平型關，威名天下揚。 嘿！ 遊擊戰，敵後方，鏟除偽政權， 遊擊戰、敵後方，堅持反掃蕩， 鋼刀插在敵胸膛。 巍峨長白山，滔滔鴨綠江，誓復失地逐強梁。 爭民族獨立，求人類解放， 這神聖的重大責任，都擔在我們雙肩。 | Tiěliú liǎngwàn wǔqiān lǐ, zhí xiàngzhe yī gè jiāndìng de fāngxiàng, Kǔ dòu shí nián, duànliàn chéng yī zhī bùkě zhànshèng de lìliàng. Yīdàn qiánglǔ kòu biānjiāng, kāngkǎi bēigē shàng zhànchǎng, Shǒuzhàn Píngxíng Guān, wēimíng tiānxià yáng. Hēi！ Yóujīzhàn, díhòufāng, chǎnchú wěi zhèngquán, Yóujīzhàn, díhòufāng, jiānchí fǎn sǎodàng, Gāngdāo chāzài dí xiōngtáng. Wēié Chángbái Shān, tāotāo Yālù Jiāng, shì fù shīdì zhú qiángliáng. Zhēng mínzú dúlì, qiú rénlèi jiěfàng, Zhè shénshèng de zhòngdà zérèn, dōu dānzài wǒmén shuāngjiān. | We march 25000 li in a firm destination. After ten years of hard work, we became an unconquerable force. When the enemy invades our borders, we go to frontline with a heroic but solemn tone. Our first battle was at Pingxingguan, our fame was known to all in the world. Hey! We are guerrillas in the base of the enemy, crush the puppet regime! We are guerrillas in the base of the enemy, resist destruction! We are knives in the chest of the enemies. Majestic Changbai Mountain, surging Yalu River, swear to reclaim land and oust aggressors. Struggle for national liberation, strive for the liberation of mankind. This sacred responsibility rests upon our shoulders. |
