= Zhuang Yunkuan =

Chinese politician (1867–1932)

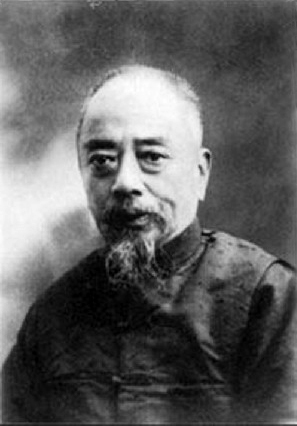

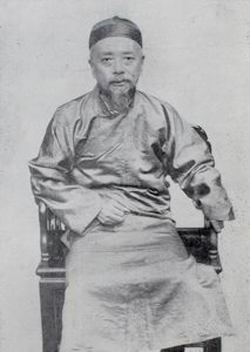

Zhuang Yunkuan (Chinese: 莊蘊寬; 3 January 1867 – 2 March 1932), courtesy name Sijian (Chinese: 思缄), art name Baohong (Chinese: 抱闳), was a Chinese calligrapher and Qing dynasty and Republic of China politician. He was born in Wujin County, Changzhou Prefecture, Jiangsu (modern Wujin District, Changzhou). He was prefect of Pingnan County, Guangxi, Sicheng (in Lingyun County) and Wuzhou. He was a delegate to the conference to create a provisional constitution for the Republic of China. In 1925, he served on the board of directors for the National Palace Museum.

== Relatives ==
- Wu Zuguang: grandnephew
