= Longing for Husband Cloud =

Longing for Husband Cloud or Cloud Gazing or Cloud of Eternal Sorrow (望夫云) is a story of the Bai people.

It is also the title of a 1962 Chinese-language western-style opera composed by Zheng Lücheng to a libretto by Xu Jiarui.
