= Women's Lives =

Women's Lives (Chinese: 婦女生活; pinyin: Fùnǚ Shēnghuó) was a monthly Chinese periodical which was published from July 1935 to January 1941. It began in Shanghai as the house journal of the Shanghai Women's National Salvation Society (上海婦女界救國會) under the editorship of the Communist Shen Zijiu. In November 1937, it moved to Wuhan and, later, was again forced to relocate to the provisional Republican capital Chongqing, where Cao Mengjun served as editor-in-chief.

Its stated aim was to "enlighten the majority of women so they can achieve their own emancipation through participation in social movements". The inaugural issue included an article arguing women should devote themselves to nationalism and social reform. It opposed the return of women to the home under what it called the "new good-wife and wise-mother-ism" espoused by some Nationalist politicians. When the Ping opera singer Bai Yushuang was expelled by the mayor of Beiping (now Beijing) for the revealing attire and obscene lyrics of her 1933 Chasing Flies, Women's Lives reported icily that "thousands of square miles of Chinese territory have been occupied by the Japanese without any resistance, but if a woman offends public decency, she must be expelled."

A major contributor was Huang Biyao, a graduate of Tokyo's Women's Advanced Teacher's School and an educator at many Chinese high schools.
