= Heads Teachers and Industry =

HTI (Head Teachers and Industry) was created by UK business leaders to provide leadership training for teachers. It has been described as “the leading UK charity, which works at the strategic interface between education and business.”

In 1986 the Confederation of British Industry in partnership with the UK Government Department for Education, with support from businesses across the UK, formed the charity Headteachers into Industry, which in 1996 became Heads, Teachers and Industry with Anne Evans, OBE, as the first Chief Executive. In May 2010 HTI was awarded the AEBE, Award for Education Business Excellence.

Summing up one of the main aims of Heads, Teachers and Industry Roger Opie stated: "Since its start in 1986 HTI has been driven by business with a clear objective to raise awareness of employability issues amongst young people”

== Research ==
As well as organising training, secondments and placements in business for teachers, HTI also supports research. This includes research projects such as the Hay Group report Maverick, Breakthrough Leadership That Transforms Schools

HTI also directly commissions research and reflective Thinkpiece booklets. The Thinkpiece series includes:

- Learners as Leaders, by Rosemary Patey, 2004
- Learn as You Earn, by Dean O’Donoghue, 2005
- A Flight Away, by Pam Matty, 2005
- The Arts for All, by Nicola Stapleton, 2005
- A Foot in the Door, by Jane Farrimond, 2006
- A Richer Text, by Barbara Easton, 2007
