= Bai Yushuang =

Chinese opera singer and actress

Li Guizhen (Chinese: 李桂珍, p Lǐ Guìzhēn; 1907–1942), better known by her stage name Bai Yushuang (白玉霜, p Bái Yùshuāng, lit "White Jade Frost"), was a Chinese Ping Opera singer and actress. She was one of "The Four Famous Dans" (四大名旦, Sì Dàmíng Dàn) and remains known as the "Queen of Pingju" (t 評劇皇后, s 评剧皇后, Píngjù Huánghòu). (Note: Literally "empress" but usually rendered as "queen" in English translation.)

== Life ==
Li Guizhen was born in Guye, Luan County, Hebei. As a child, she was sold to the wandering entertainer Li Jingchun and his wife Mrs Bian, who renamed her Li Huimin (李慧敏, Lǐ Huìmǐn). Her status within the family was reduced when Mrs Bian gave birth to a son, Li Guozhang. She was then forced to earn money on the street by singing stories accompanied by a small drum or other instrument. At fourteen, she began learning pingju from Dong Faliang, taking supporting roles under the stage name "Bai Yushuang". She became celebrated in Beiping (now Beijing) and Tianjin for her extreme range, from very high notes to lower than lowest note of the erhu. Upon Li Jingchun's death, his widow Mrs Bian purchased more girls from poor families. The 4-year-old Xiaodezi was renamed Fuzi and instructed to refer to Li Guizhen as her mother.

Bai Yushuang began to perform lead roles for the Yushun Opera Troupe. This company was owned by Mrs Bian, managed by her brother, and accompanied by her son on the erhu, a situation which led to its being generally known as the Li Troupe (Lijia Ban). Bai Yushuang eventually changed its name to the North China Opera Troupe (t 華北戯社, s 华北戏社, Huáběi Xìshè). She became notorious as a "slutty performer" (淫伶, yínlíng) and "contaminant" following her performance as a fly spirit in the 1933 Catching Flies (t 捉蒼蠅, s 捉苍蝇, Zhuō Cāngying), when her costume consisted of a red dudou and tight white clothes under some long scarves, and was expelled from Beiping by its mayor for performing "obscene lyrics". The Chinese periodical Women's Lives reported icily that "thousands of square miles of Chinese territory have been occupied by the Japanese without any resistance, but if a woman offends public decency, she must be expelled."

Relocating to Shanghai in 1935, Li Guizhen performed pingju alongside Ai Lianjun, Yu Lingzhi, and Zhao Ruquan to large audiences at the Enpaiya Theater and on tour through Suzhou, Wuxi, and Nanjing. The repertoire included Pan Jinlian, Spring in the Jade Hall (玉堂春, Yù Táng Chūn), The Little Matchmaker (t 紅娘, s 红娘, Hóngniáng), Yan Poxi, and The Lioness's Roar (t 河東獅吼, s 河东狮吼, Hédōng Shīhǒu). She was arrested and accused of murder but Mrs Bian was able to extricate her from the charges. Her character was attacked by conservatives but defended by Zhao Jinshen and A Ying in the press and the reformers Tian Han, Hong Shen, and Ouyang Yuqian worked with her to work "anti-feudalist" messages into her historical dramas. She became a movie star following her role in Zhang Shichuan's 1936 Red Begonia (t 海棠紅, s 海棠红, Hǎitáng Hóng) and was considered one of "The Four Famous Dans", alongside Liu Cuixia, Ai Lianjun, and Xi Cailian.

She fell in love with the cymbal player Li Yongqi, but Mrs Bian prevented their marriage to protect the profits she was deriving from her "money tree" (yaoqianshu). The pair eloped to his hometown in Ba County, Hebei, in February 1937. She dressed and lived as a peasant for six months before Mrs Bian ultimately negotiated for her return and the troupe's return to Tianjin and Beiping. Around the time of the Japanese occupation of the city, Bai Yushuang was diagnosed with uterine cancer. She received treatment at Beiping's German hospital and her understudy Fuzi—under the name Little Bai Yushuang (小白玉霜, p Xiao Bái Yùshuāng)—only replaced her once she was too ill to take the stage. In Spring of 1942, Li Guizhen returned to Tianjin to find that her bank accounts and property had been transferred to Mrs Bian's son. She collapsed on stage during a performance of Understanding after Death (t 死後明白, s 死后明白, Sǐ Hòu Míngbai) with Li Yifen in July 1942 and subsequently died.

== See also ==
- Pingju
- Chinese opera
