= Gwangju Munhwa Broadcasting Corporation =

TV and radio station in South Korea

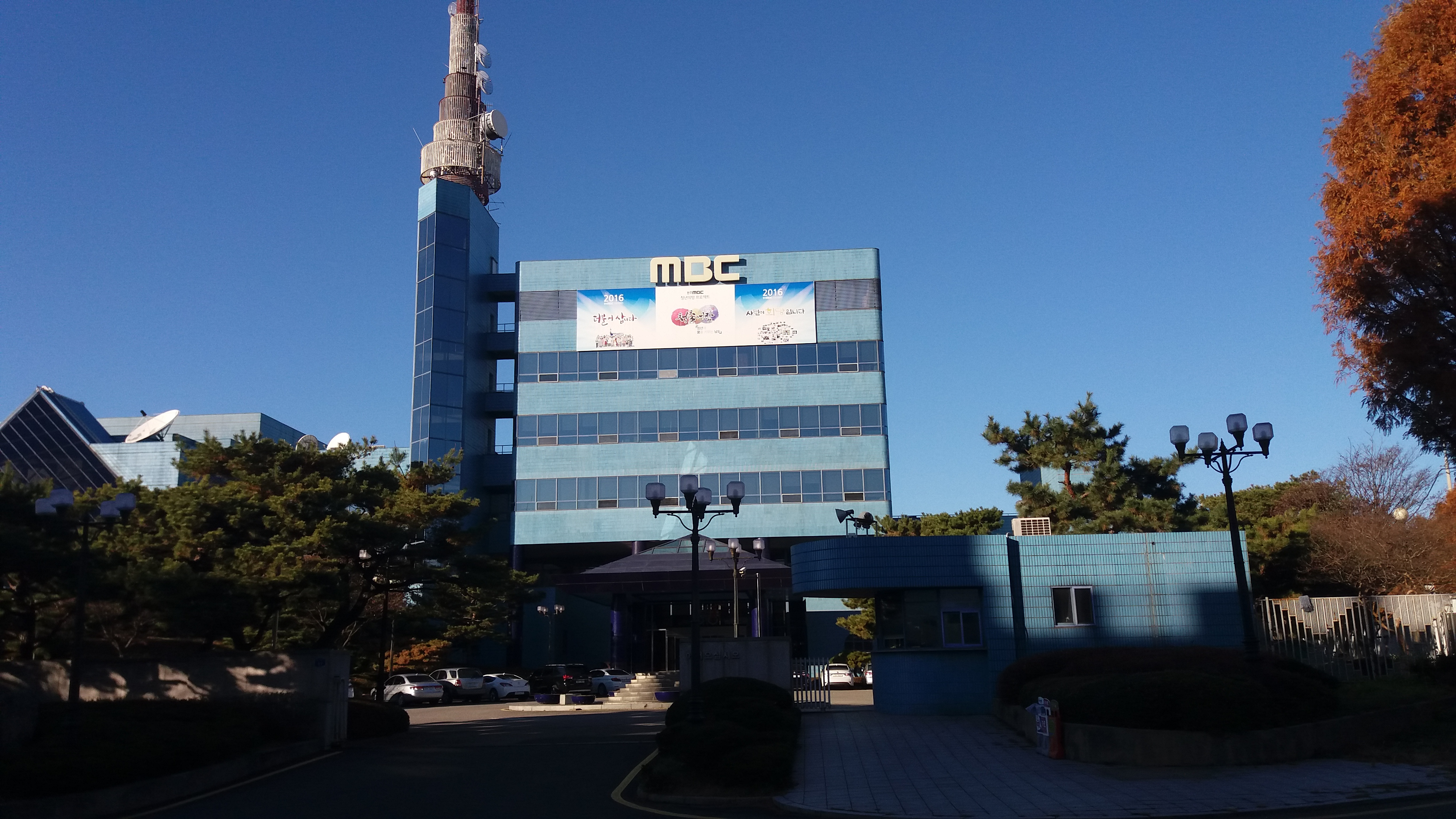

The Gwangju Munhwa Broadcasting Corporation (Korean: 광주문화방송) is MBC's local branch for the city of Gwangju. The station uses the "HLCQ" callsign.

== History ==
Gwangju MBC started radio broadcasts on 13 June 1964. On 29 August 1970, Honam Television (HBC) opened as an MBC TV affiliate on channel 9, on 30 September 1971, it was absorbed into the existing company.

Affected by the Gwangju Uprising in May 1980, Gwangju MBC's headquarters were set on fire by protesters, accusing MBC of manipulation. A color picture of the building on fire was unearthed by the Asahi Shimbun archives in 2021, when its reporters were on duty for the coverage of the turmoil in Korea. In October, 51% of the shares were forcibly transferred to the government under pressure of the government-backed merger and shutdown of media outlets, in April 1981, color television broadcasts started. The HD news center opened in 2009 and analog broadcasts ended on October 30, 2012.

On the 60th anniversary of its founding, a speech was given apologizing for the distorted reporting in May 1980.
