= Shen Zijiu =

Chinese politician (1898–1989)

- 沈兹九
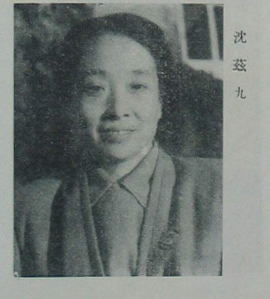
- Shen Zijiu, photographed c. 1949

Personal details
- Born: 1898 Hangzhou, Qing Empire
- Died: 26 December 1989 (aged 91) Beijing, People's Republic of China
- Party: Chinese Communist Party

Shen Zijiu (Note: In this Chinese name, the family name is Shen.) (Chinese: 沈兹九; pinyin: Shén Zījiu; 1898 – 26 December 1989), also known by the alias Chenyan, was a Chinese editor and politician.

== Early life ==
Shen Zijiu was born in 1898 in Hangzhou, Qing China. Her father was a silk merchant. She attended the Provincial Girls Normal School in Zhejiang and was among her cohort's top performers. Following a short stint as an elementary school teacher, Shen enrolled at Beijing University where she would complete her undergraduate degree in philosophy. After graduating from university, Shen's husband, whom she had married at age 17, died of typhoid fever. Entrusting their daughter to her mother's care, Shen left for Tokyo, Japan in 1921 and studied art at the Ochanomizu University for four years. Returning home in 1925, Shen resumed her teaching career at various schools, including the Nanjing Huiwen Girls' High School, the Jiangsu Songjiang Girls' High School, and the Zhejiang Normal School for Women.

== Later years ==
Dissatisfied with being a widow, Shen remarried but found her second husband, Xu Qingyu (徐庆誉), too much of a male chauvinist; the relationship ended in divorce in 1931. After her father's company filed for bankruptcy, Shen moved to Shanghai where she was recruited as assistant editor and Japanese translator for the Chinese-language current affairs journal Shishi leibian (时事类编) published by the Zhongshan Culture and Education Bureau. In Shishi and elsewhere, Shen would occasionally use the pseudonym "Chenyan" or simply sign off as "Zi". In Shanghai, while keenly following the May Fourth Movement, Shen acquainted herself with leftists and Chinese Communist Party (CCP) members alike; with their support, she became founding editor of the women's magazine Funü shenghuo (妇女生活) in 1935. The magazine ran anti-Japanese propaganda and rallied Chinese women to support the National Salvation Movement; Shen herself was the deputy secretary general of the executive committee of the Association of Shanghai Women's National Salvation Movement.

Shen attracted public attention with the launch of Funü; in her newfound capacity as a leading women's rights activist, she attended a women's conference at Mount Lu organized by Soong Mei-ling and thereafter chaired the New Life Movement Women Supervision Committee's cultural affairs group, with an interest in mobilizing female factory workers for the anti-Japanese resistance. Shen officially joined the CPC in 1939 and was posted to Singapore in 1941 to assist with journalist Hu Yuzhi's anti-Japanese work. In February 1942, as the Battle of Singapore was being fought, the couple, now married, fled to Indonesia together with Yu Dafu; Shen recorded her wartime experiences in a series of articles later compiled into a book entitled Exile on the Equator (流亡在赤道线上). After spending some four years in hiding, the couple returned to Singapore to establish the New South Seas Publishing Company (新南洋出版社), which catered to the overseas Chinese with publications as New Women (新妇女) and Below the Winds (风下). Shen was also the director of the women's group at the Malaya-based branch of the China Democratic League (founded 1947). Returning to China via Hong Kong in 1948, Hu Yuzhi became the first director of the People Republic of China's State Publishing Bureau, while Shen was appointed editor-in-chief of Women of New China (新中国妇女). The following year, she travelled to Hebei to help organize the inaugural All-China Women's Congress that would be held in the capital.

== Final years ==
Shen's political career ended during the Cultural Revolution, as did Hu Yuzhi's. Hu died in 1986, while Shen Zijiu died on 26 December 1989 in Beijing, aged 91. Shen was highly regarded by her contemporaries as both a writer and a politician; writer Lin Wanjing (林万菁) called her one of China's "most tireless women's rights activists".
