= Ping opera =

Form of opera from northern China

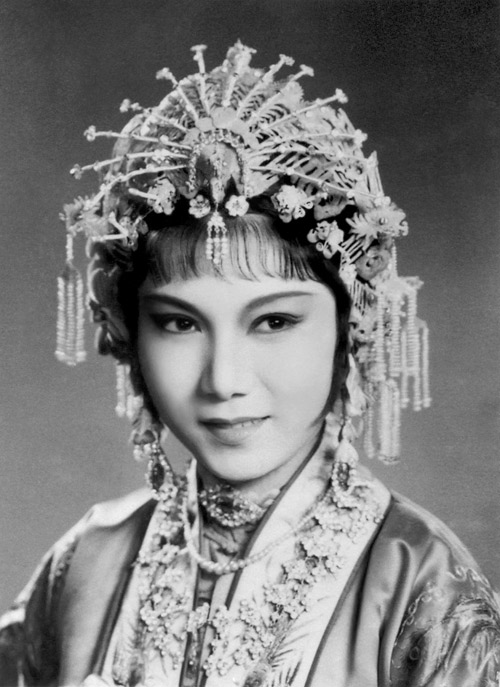
Xin Fengxia in the pingju Flowers as Matchmakers

Pingju or Ping opera (Chinese: 評劇; pinyin: píngjù) is a form of Chinese opera from northern China.

== History ==
Pingju originated in Tangshan, Hebei, near the city of Tianjin. Among all China's regional operas, it was the most famous in the Republican period for its passionate performances and romantic plots.

Movies based upon and incorporating Pingju include Zhang Shichuan's 1936 Red Begonia (t 海棠紅, s 海棠红, Hǎitáng Hóng), starring Bai Yushuang.

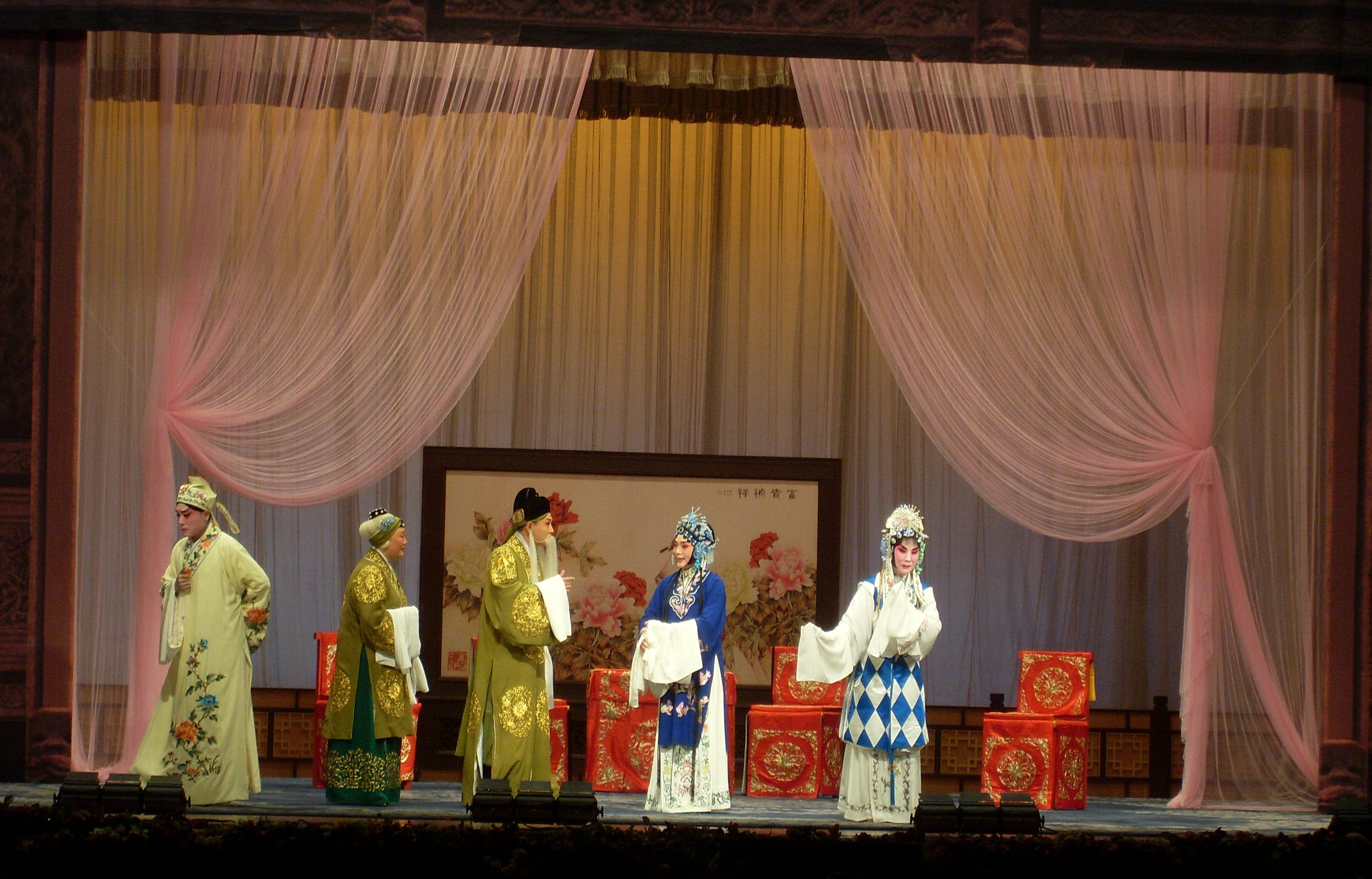
A Pingju performance in Tianjin

== Performers ==
Bai Yushuang was known as the "Queen of Pingju". Other famed performers include Xin Fengxia and her mentor Hua Furong.

== Bibliography ==
- Cheng, Weikun (June 2002). "The Use of "Public" Women: Commercialized Performance, Nation-Building, and Actresses' Strategies in Early Twentieth-Century Beijing" (PDF). WID Working Papers. Ann Arbor: Office of Women in International Development, Michigan State University.
