= Xue Pinggui and Wang Baochuan =

Legend commonly performed in Chinese opera theatres

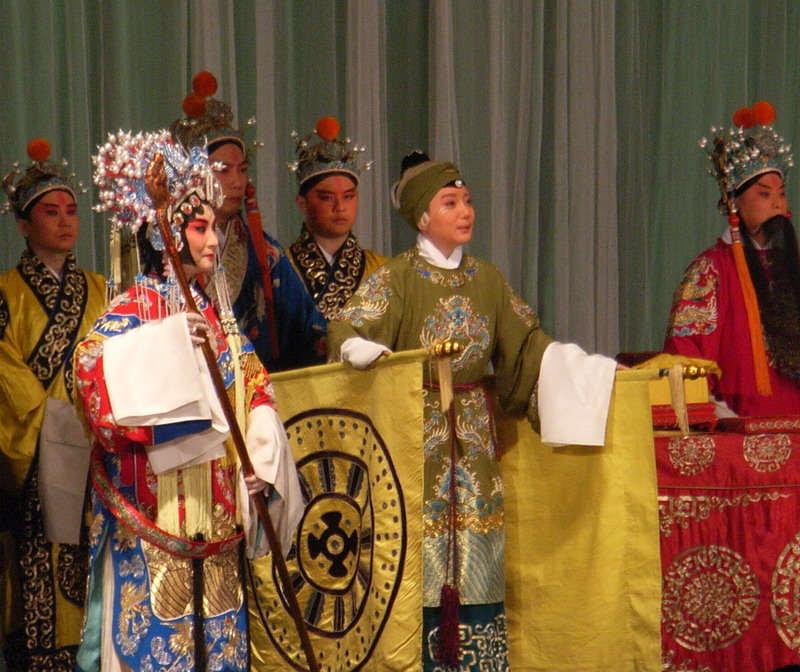
From a 2007 Peking opera performance.

Wang Baochuan and Xue Pinggui (Chinese: 薛平貴與王寶釧), also known by many other names such as Xue Pinggui, The Red-Maned Stallion, Wujiapo, Returning to the Cave, and The Story of the Colourful Tower, is a legend commonly performed in Chinese opera theatres. The story is set in the Tang dynasty, during the reign of Emperor Xuanzong in the 9th century CE.

The story is known in the West as Lady Precious Stream ("Precious Stream" being a loose translation of the female protagonist's given name, Baochuan), as it was adapted for the British stage by Hsiung Shih-I, a Chinese academic living in England. It was performed at the Little Theatre in John Street, London, by the People's National Theatre, directed by Nancy Price and Hsiung, and ran for 1,000 nights. The play was later performed on Broadway at the Booth Theatre in New York, produced by Morris Gest.

== Film and TV adaptations ==
- Wang Baochuan, a 1939 Chinese film
- Lady Precious Stream, a 1950 English TV film
- The Story of Sit Ping-kwai and Wong Bo-chuen, a 1956 Taiwanese film
- The Story of Wong Bo-Chuan, a 1959 Hong Kong film
- The Story of Ping Gui, a 1967 Taiwanese film
- Wang Baochuan and Xue Pinggui, a 1999 Taiwanese TV series
- Love Amongst War, a 2012 Chinese TV series
